= Cascada discography =

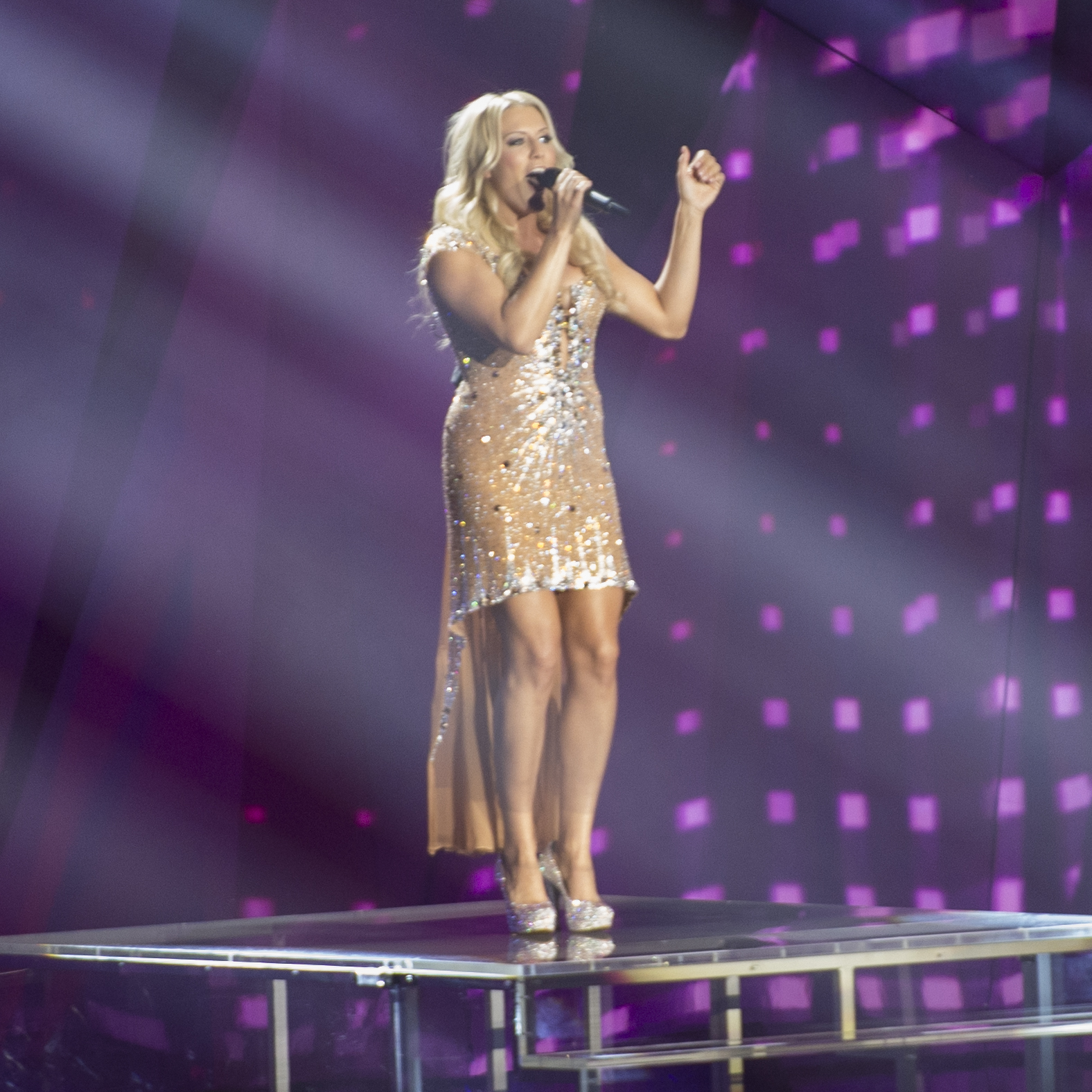
- Cascada frontwoman Natalie Horler performing at the Eurovision Song Contest 2013
- Studio albums: 6
- Compilation albums: 6
- Singles: 39
- Music videos: 30
- Remix albums: 1
- Promotional singles: 1

German Eurodance group Cascada has released six studio album’s one of which is a Christmas album and an acoustic album, six compilation albums, one remix album, 39 singles (including one as a featured artist), one promotional single and 30 music videos.

Cascada's debut album, Everytime We Touch, was released in February 2006 and spawned a chain of hit singles including the title track second single "Everytime We Touch". The album also includes the internationally successful "Miracle" and "Truly Madly Deeply". Their second album, Perfect Day, was released in December 2007, which was commercially successful and produced the international single, "What Hurts the Most". This was followed by Evacuate the Dancefloor at the summer 2009 and the title track and first single, "Evacuate the Dancefloor", entered the UK Singles Chart at number one becoming Cascada's first number one in the UK. The following album, Original Me, became Cascada's lowest-charting album, but spawned moderately successful singles such as "Pyromania" and "San Francisco". They released a greatest-hits album after, including the singles "Summer of Love", "The Rhythm of the Night", "Glorious" which was used in the Eurovision Song Contest 2013, and "The World Is in My Hands".

== Albums ==
=== Studio albums ===
List of studio albums, with selected chart positions and certifications
| Title | Album details | Peak chart positions | | | | | | | | | | Certifications |
| Title | Album details | GER | AUS | AUT | FRA | IRL | NLD | SWI | UK | US | US Dance | Certifications |
|---|---|---|---|---|---|---|---|---|---|---|---|---|
| Everytime We Touch | Released: 5 March 2006; Label: Zooland; Formats: CD, digital download | 50 | — | 31 | 11 | 1 | 40 | 48 | 2 | 67 | 3 | BPI: Platinum; IRMA: Gold; SNEP: Gold |
| Perfect Day | Released: 3 December 2007; Label: Zooland; Formats: CD, digital download | 30 | — | 16 | 17 | 6 | — | 81 | 9 | 70 | 2 | BPI: Silver; IRMA: Gold |
| Evacuate the Dancefloor | Released: 3 July 2009; Label: Zooland; Formats: CD, digital download | 21 | 58 | 15 | 19 | 15 | 69 | 36 | 8 | 155 | 7 | BPI: Platinum |
| Original Me | Released: 17 June 2011; Label: Zooland; Formats: CD, digital download | 41 | — | 46 | — | — | — | 44 | 24 | — | — | BPI: Silver |
| It's Christmas Time | Released: 30 November 2012; Label: Zooland; Formats: digital download | — | — | — | — | — | — | — | — | — | — | |
| Studio 24 | Released: 11 October 2024; Label: Stars by Edel; Formats: CD, vinyl, digital download | 81 | — | 72 | — | — | — | — | — | — | — | |
"—" denotes a recording that did not chart or was not released in that territory.

=== Compilation albums ===
List of compilation albums, with selected chart positions
| Title | Album details | Peak chart positions | | |
| Title | Album details | GER | AUT | SWI |
|---|---|---|---|---|
| Greatest Hits | Released: 31 July 2009; Label: Select Musiek; Formats: CD; Countries: South Africa | — | — | — |
| Just the Hits | Released: 16 November 2010; Label: Robbins Entertainment; Formats: CD, digital download; Countries: Canada | — | — | — |
| Back on the Dancefloor | Released: 13 April 2012; Label: Zooland; Formats: CD, digital download; Countries: Germany, Austria, Switzerland | 35 | 31 | 25 |
| The Best of Cascada | Released: 29 March 2013; Label: Zooland; Formats: CD, digital download; Countries: Germany, Austria, Switzerland | 6 | — | — |
| 2015 | Released: 27 January 2015; Label: EQ Music; Formats: CD; Countries: Singapore, Malaysia | — | — | — |
| Best of Cascada | Released: 18 May 2018; Label: Central Station Records; Formats: CD, digital download; Countries: Australia | — | — | — |
"—" denotes a recording that did not chart or was not released in that territory.

=== Remix albums ===
| Title | Album details |
|---|---|
| The Remix Album | Released: 10 November 2006; Label: Zooland; Formats: CD, digital download |

=== Acoustic albums ===
| Title | Album details |
|---|---|
| Acoustic Sessions | Released: 1 November 2013; Label: Zooland; Formats: CD, digital download |

== Singles ==
=== As lead artist ===
List of singles as lead artist, with selected chart positions and certifications, showing year released and album name
| Title | Year | Peak chart positions | | | | | | | | | | Certifications | Album |
| Title | Year | GER | AUS | AUT | FRA | IRL | NLD | SWE | SWI | UK | US | Certifications | Album |
|---|---|---|---|---|---|---|---|---|---|---|---|---|---|
| "Miracle" | 2004 | 32 | — | 24 | 1 | 4 | 6 | 10 | 85 | 8 | — (Note: "Miracle" did not enter the Billboard Hot 100, but peaked at number 6 on the Bubbling Under Hot 100 Singles chart.) | BPI: Silver; RIAA: Gold; SNEP: Gold | Everytime We Touch |
| "Everytime We Touch" | 2005 | 5 | 61 | 4 | 2 | 1 | 10 | 1 | 15 | 2 | 10 | BVMI: 2× Platinum; BPI: 2× Platinum; IFPI SWE: 2× Platinum; RIAA: Platinum; SNEP: Platinum | Everytime We Touch |
| "How Do You Do!" | 2005 | — | — | 50 | — | — | — | — | — | — | — | | Everytime We Touch |
| "Truly Madly Deeply" | 2006 | 26 | 39 | 22 | — | 3 | 25 | 11 | — | 4 | — (Note: "Truly Madly Deeply" did not enter the Billboard Hot 100, but peaked at number 14 on the Dance/Mix Show Airplay chart.) | BPI: Silver | Everytime We Touch |
| "A Neverending Dream" | 2006 | — | — | — | 15 | 15 | — | — | — | 46 | — | | Everytime We Touch |
| "Ready for Love" | 2006 | — | — | — | — | — | — | — | — | — | — | | Everytime We Touch |
| "What Hurts the Most" | 2007 | 9 | — | 3 | 2 | 6 | 23 | 5 | — | 10 | 52 | BPI: Silver; RIAA: Gold | Perfect Day |
| "What Do You Want from Me?" | 2008 | 54 | — | 50 | — | — | — | — | — | 51 | — | | Perfect Day |
| "Because the Night" | 2008 | 41 | — | 45 | — | — | — | — | — | 28 | — | | Perfect Day |
| "Faded" | 2008 | — | — | — | — | — | — | — | — | — | — (Note: "Faded" did not enter the Billboard Hot 100, but peaked at number 7 on the Dance/Mix Show Airplay chart.) | | Perfect Day |
| "Perfect Day" | 2009 | — | — | — | — | — | — | — | — | — | — (Note: "Perfect Day" did not enter the Billboard Hot 100, but peaked at number 20 on the Dance/Mix Show Airplay chart.) | | Perfect Day |
| "Evacuate the Dancefloor" | 2009 | 5 | 3 | 5 | 5 | 2 | 1 | 13 | 7 | 1 | 25 | BVMI: Platinum; ARIA: Platinum; BPI: Platinum; NVPI: Gold; RIAA: Platinum | Evacuate the Dancefloor |
| "Fever" | 2009 | 31 | 41 | 38 | 10 | — | 24 | — | — | — | — | | Evacuate the Dancefloor |
| "Dangerous" | 2009 | — | — | — | — | — | 99 | — | — | 67 | — | | Evacuate the Dancefloor |
| "Pyromania" | 2010 | 21 | — | 26 | 11 | — | 29 | — | — | 60 | — (Note: "Pyromania" did not enter the Billboard Hot 100, but peaked at number 19 on the Dance/Mix Show Airplay chart.) | | Original Me |
| "San Francisco" | 2011 | 13 | — | 14 | — | — | 11 | — | — | 64 | — | | Original Me |
| "Au Revoir" | 2011 | 73 | — | 31 | — | — | — | — | — | — | — | | Original Me |
| "Night Nurse" | 2011 | — | — | — | — | — | — | — | — | — | — | | Original Me |
| "Summer of Love" | 2012 | 13 | — | 7 | 23 | — | — | — | 13 | 123 | — | | Back on the Dancefloor |
| "The Rhythm of the Night" | 2012 | 26 | — | 9 | — | — | — | — | 22 | — | — | | The Best of Cascada |
| "Glorious" | 2013 | 6 | — | 29 | — | 94 | — | — | 56 | 129 | — | | The Best of Cascada |
| "The World Is in My Hands" | 2013 | — | — | — | — | — | — | — | — | — | — | | The Best of Cascada |
| "Blink" | 2014 | — | — | — | — | — | — | — | — | — | — (Note: "Blink" did not enter the Billboard Hot 100, but peaked at number 34 on the Hot Dance/Electronic Songs chart.) | | Non-album singles |
| "Madness" (featuring Tris) | 2014 | — | — | — | — | — | — | — | — | — | — | | Non-album singles |
| "Reason" | 2015 | — | — | — | — | — | — | — | — | — | — | | Non-album singles |
| "Run" | 2017 | — | — | — | — | — | — | — | — | — | — | | Non-album singles |
| "Playground" | 2017 | — | — | — | — | — | — | — | — | — | — | | Non-album singles |
| "Back for Good" | 2018 | — | — | — | — | — | — | — | — | — | — | | Non-album singles |
| "Like the Way I Do" | 2019 | — | — | — | — | — | — | — | — | — | — | | Non-album singles |
| "I'm Feeling It (In the Air)" | 2020 | — | — | — | — | — | — | — | — | — | — (Note: "I'm Feeling It (In the Air)" did not enter the Billboard Hot 100, but peaked at number 14 on the Dance/Electronic Digital Song Sales chart.) | | Non-album singles |
| "One Last Dance" (with Trans-X) | 2021 | — | — | — | — | — | — | — | — | — | — | | Non-album singles |
| "Never Let Me Go" (with Timmy Trumpet and Harris & Ford) | 2021 | — | — | — | — | — | — | — | — | — | — | | Non-album singles |
| "Never Be Lonely" (Cascada Remix) (with Jax Jones and Zoe Wees) | 2024 | 44 | — | — | — | 81 | — | — | — | 41 | — | BPI: Silver | Non-album singles |
| "Ain't No Mountain High Enough" | 2024 | — | — | — | — | — | — | — | — | — | — | | Studio 24 |
| "Call Me" | 2024 | — | — | — | — | — | — | — | — | — | — | | Studio 24 |
| "Studio 24" | 2024 | — | — | — | — | — | — | — | — | — | — | | Studio 24 |
| "Beautiful Odyssey" (with YouNotUs) | 2025 | — | — | — | — | — | — | — | — | — | — | | Non-album singles |
| "Boy You Turn Me" (with Felix Jaehn) | 2026 | — | — | — | — | — | — | — | — | — | — | | Non-album singles |
| "Youtopia" | 2026 | — | — | — | — | — | — | — | — | — | — | | Non-album singles |
| "Alive" | 2026 | — | — | — | — | — | — | — | — | — | — | | Non-album singles |
| "Be The One" | 2026 | — | — | — | — | — | — | — | — | — | — | | Non-album singles |
"—" denotes a recording that did not chart or was not released in that territory.

=== As featured artist ===
| Title | Year |
|---|---|
| "Jump" (Jerome Molnar featuring Cascada) | 2011 |
| "Praise You" (Cassiano featuring Cascada) | 2016 |

=== Promotional singles ===
List of promotional singles, with selected chart positions, showing year released and album name
| Title | Year | Peak chart positions | | | Album |
| Title | Year | GER | AUT | UK | Album |
|---|---|---|---|---|---|
| "Last Christmas" | 2007 | 82 | 63 | 111 | It's Christmas Time |

=== Other charted songs ===
| Title | Year | Peak chart positions | Album |
| Title | Year | SWE | Album |
|---|---|---|---|
| "Wouldn't It Be Good" | 2006 | 54 | Everytime We Touch |

== Music videos ==
| Year | Title | Director(s) |
|---|---|---|
| 2004 | "Miracle" | Lisa Mann |
| 2005 | "Everytime We Touch" (original version) | Max Nichols |
| 2005 | "Everytime We Touch" (international version) | Max Nichols |
| 2006 | "Truly Madly Deeply" | Stephen Gragg |
| 2007 | "A Neverending Dream" | Stephen Gragg |
| 2007 | "What Hurts the Most" | Clark Jackson |
| 2007 | "Last Christmas" | Dirk Hilger |
| 2008 | "What Do You Want from Me?" | Silvio Soldini |
| 2008 | "Because the Night" | Dirk Hilger |
| 2009 | "Evacuate the Dancefloor" | Max Nichols |
| 2009 | "Fever" | Dirk Hilger |
| 2009 | "Dangerous" | Jonathan Mostow |
| 2010 | "Pyromania" | Lisa Mann |
| 2010 | "Night Nurse" | Lisa Mann |
| 2011 | "San Francisco" | Lisa Mann |
| 2011 | "Au Revoir" | Lisa Mann |
| 2011 | "Let It Snow" | Lina Schütze |
| 2012 | "Summer of Love" | Lina Schütze |
| 2012 | "The Rhythm of the Night" | Iulian Moga |
| 2013 | "Glorious" | Lina Schütze |
| 2013 | "The World Is in My Hands" | Lina Schütze |
| 2013 | "You" | Lina Schütze |
| 2014 | "Blink" | Lina Schütze |
| 2014 | "Madness" | Lina Schütze |
| 2015 | "Reason" | Lina Schütze |
| 2017 | "Playground" | Lina Schütze |
| 2019 | "Like the Way I Do" | Lina Schütze |
| 2021 | "One Last Dance" | |
| 2024 | "Ain´t No Mountain High Enough" | Marcel Brell |
| 2024 | "Call Me" | Marcel Brell |
