= Back on the Dancefloor =

Greatest hits album by Cascada
- Released: 13 April 2012
- Recorded: 2004–12
- Genres: Eurodance; electropop
- Label: Zooland
- Producers: Yanou; DJ Manian

Cascada chronology
| The Greatest Hits (2011) | Back on the Dancefloor (2012) | It's Christmas Time (2012) |

Singles from Back on the Dancefloor
- 1. "Summer of Love" Released: 30 March 2012

Back on the Dancefloor is the second compilation album by German dance trio Cascada. It was released 13 April 2012 in their home country. Consisting of two discs featuring past singles and remixes from the previous eight years. The album's first and only new song, "Summer of Love", was released prior to the compilation and peaked within the top 20 in Germany.

== Content ==
The album consists of fourteen singles and one new song, "Summer of Love". The singles include the global hits "Evacuate the Dancefloor", "Everytime We Touch", and "What Hurts the Most". Unlike the previous compilation disc available with Original Me, it features the group's debut single "Miracle".

== Singles ==
- "Summer of Love", was released 30 March 2012 and charted at No. 13 in Germany and Switzerland. It reached No. 7 in Austria, the single's highest position.

== Track listing ==
=== CD 1 ===
| No. | Title | Writer(s) | Length |
|---|---|---|---|
| 1. | "Summer of Love (Video Edit)" | Yann Peifer, Manuel Reuter, Andres Ballinas, Tony Cornelissen | 3:35 |
| 2. | "Evacuate the Dancefloor (Radio Edit)" | Yann Peifer, Manuel Reuter, Allan Eshuijs | 3:25 |
| 3. | "Everytime We Touch (Radio Edit)" | Peter Risavy, Maggie Reilly, Stuart MacKillop | 3:17 |
| 4. | "Miracle (Radio Mix)" | Yann Peifer, Manuel Reuter | 3:38 |
| 5. | "What Hurts the Most (Radio Mix)" | Steve Robson, Jeffrey Steele | 3:38 |
| 6. | "San Francisco" | Yann Peifer, Manuel Reuter, Tony Cornelissen | 3:46 |
| 7. | "Because the Night" | Bruce Springsteen, Patti Smith | 3:23 |
| 8. | "Truly Madly Deeply (Radio Edit)" | Darren Hayes, Daniel Jones | 2:55 |
| 9. | "Fever" | Yann Peifer, Manuel Reuter, Andres Ballinas | 3:19 |
| 10. | "Pyromania (Radio Edit)" | Yann Peifer, Manuel Reuter, Allan Eshuijs | 3:29 |
| 11. | "Dangerous (Radio Edit)" | Yann Peifer, Manuel Reuter, Tony Cornelissen | 2:58 |
| 12. | "Night Nurse" | Yann Peifer, Manuel Reuter, Tony Cornelissen | 3:22 |
| 13. | "Perfect Day" | Yann Peifer, Manuel Reuter, Allan Eshuijs | 3:42 |
| 14. | "A Neverending Dream (Radio Mix)" | Alexander Kaiser, Matthew Uhle | 3:22 |
| 15. | "Au Revoir (Radio Edit)" | Yann Peifer, Manuel Reuter, Allan Eshuijs | 3:08 |

=== CD 2 ===
| No. | Title | Writer(s) | Length |
|---|---|---|---|
| 1. | "Summer of Love (Michael Mind Project Radio Edit)" | Yann Peifer, Manuel Reuter, Andres Ballinas, Tony Cornelissen | 3:24 |
| 2. | "Evacuate the Dancefloor (Rob Mayth Radio Edit)" | Yann Peifer, Manuel Reuter, Allan Eshuijs | 3:31 |
| 3. | "Everytime We Touch (2-4 Grooves Remix)" | Peter Risavy, Maggie Reilly, Stuart MacKillop | 3:00 |
| 4. | "Miracle (Hitmen Radio Edit)" | Yann Peifer, Manuel Reuter | 3:26 |
| 5. | "What Hurts the Most (Topmodelz Radio Mix)" | Steve Robson, Jeffrey Steele | 3:44 |
| 6. | "San Francisco (Cahill Radio Edit)" | Yann Peifer, Manuel Reuter, Tony Cornelissen | 3:22 |
| 7. | "Because the Night (Manian Bootleg Mix)" | Bruce Springsteen, Patti Smith | 5:04 |
| 8. | "Truly Madly Deeply (Thomas Gold Radio Edit)" | Darren Hayes, Daniel Jones | 3:36 |
| 9. | "Fever (Ian Carey Remix)" | Yann Peifer, Manuel Reuter, Andres Ballinas | 6:52 |
| 10. | "Pyromania (Spencer & Hill Airplay Radio Mix)" | Yann Peifer, Manuel Reuter, Allan Eshuijs | 3:37 |
| 11. | "Dangerous (Wideboys Radio Edit)" | Yann Peifer, Manuel Reuter, Tony Cornelissen | 3:17 |
| 12. | "Night Nurse (Ryan Thistlebeck Vs. Dan Winter Radio Edit)" | Yann Peifer, Manuel Reuter, Tony Cornelissen | 3:55 |
| 13. | "Perfect Day (Digital Dog Radio Edit)" | Yann Peifer, Manuel Reuter, Allan Eshuijs | 3:21 |
| 14. | "A Neverending Dream (Real Booty Babes Remix)" | Alexander Kaiser, Matthew Uhle | 5:58 |
| 15. | "Au Revoir (Mondo Radio Edit)" | Yann Peifer, Manuel Reuter, Allan Eshuijs | 3:26 |

== Charts ==
| Chart (2012) | Peak position |
|---|---|
| Austrian Albums Chart | 25 |
| Swiss Albums Chart | 31 |
| Germany Albums Chart | 35 |

== Release history ==
| Country | Release date | Record label |
|---|---|---|
| Germany | April 13, 2012 | Zooland Records |
