= Original Me =

2011 studio album / greatest hits by Cascada

Studio album / greatest hits by Cascada
- Released: 17 June 2011
- Recorded: 2009–2011; Plazmatek Studio, (Cologne, Germany)
- Genres: Dance-pop; electropop
- Length: 37:52
- Labels: Zooland; Universal
- Producers: Manuel "Manian" Reuter; Yann "Yanou" Peifer

Cascada chronology
Evacuate the Dancefloor (2009)	Original Me (2011)	Back on the Dancefloor (2012)

Singles from Original Me
- 1. "Pyromania" Released: 19 March 2010; 2. "San Francisco" Released: 20 June 2011; 3. "Au Revoir" Released: 23 September 2011; 4. "Night Nurse" Released: 16 December 2011

Professional ratings
Review scores
Source	Rating
AllMusic	2.5/5 stars

Original Me is the fourth studio album from German Eurodance act Cascada, first released on 17 June 2011. Recording sessions for the album took place from 2009 to 2011 at Plazmatek Studio, Yanou Studio 1. The entire album, like their previous albums, was produced by the two DJs from Cascada, Yanou and DJ Manian. The album's genre follows in the footsteps of the preceding album, Evacuate the Dancefloor, completely shifting away from the uptempo Eurodance, containing electropop songs that are influenced by urban contemporary and pop music. Musically, the album is composed of electro-infused dance tracks with thick euro synths, cymbal crashing beats and Europop lyrics. Lyrically, the album, like the preceding albums, is composed of songs about love, dancing, and relationships.

The album was released as a two disc set. The first disc features the eleven original songs for the album. The second set is a greatest hits compilation CD, featuring every single Cascada has released internationally. Critical reception of the album was mixed, with critics praising the sound and lyrics. Despite this, the album underperformed compared to the group's previous records. This led to the album being dropped by Cascada's US record Label, Robbins Entertainment.

"Pyromania" was the first single released from the album on 19 March 2010; it was later released in the U.S. in the summer of the same year. The single achieved moderate chart positions worldwide. “Night Nurse” was released as a promotional single on 7 November 2010 in the U.K., but was released commercially in the United States exclusively on 16 December 2011. “San Francisco” was released on 1 May 2011 in Europe and in the U.S. on 4 November 2011. It peaked in the top 15 in the Netherlands, Austria and Germany. The 4th single "Au Revoir", was released in the U.K. and Germany on 23 September 2011, and in the U.S. on 15 November 2011.

== Production and composition ==
The album was produced over a two-year time period at Plazmatek Studios in Germany. Every song on the album was produced by the two disc jockeys of Cascada, DJ Manian and Yanou. Like the previous albums by the recording group, album features songwriting credits from other writers including Tony Cornelissen, Allan Eshuijs, Jonathan Kinnear, James Kinnear and Andres Ballinas. New writers on the album include Mimoza Blinsson, Alfred Tuohey, Nina Peifer, Max Persson, and Salar Gorgees. Some of the production was aided by writers on the album like Alfred Tuohey and Andres Ballinas.

For this album, Cascada decided to experiment with a new release strategy, planning to produce and release different singles and then attempting to bind them all into an album. A new single "Pyromania" was released in 2010. When interviewed about the new music coming out, lead singer Natalie Horler described their current music as going in a "slightly more pop direction". She still classifies it as dance music as it has combine their "clubby electronic pop" sound, with less beat per minute. A second single, "Night Nurse", was the released along with a music video featuring Natalie in full body paint of various colors in many scenes. This song never got a commercial release but was featured on a compilation CD in the UK. All of the singles released before the album's release date were came out six months apart, with "Pyromania" released in March, "Night Nurse" released in November and "San Francisco" released in June.

The album is comprised heavily of electropop music influenced by Europop, Eurodance and R&B. It follows in the sound of the previous album, Evacuate the Dancefloor, taking away the bell-synths, drum machines and synthesizers used in the Eurodance style they were previously known for. The production features more cymbal crashing beats, modern robotic synths and heavily auto-tuned male vocals. Other instruments featured in the production of this album include piano loops, guitars and synth strings. On two of the songs, “Unspoken” and “Independence Day”, Zimbabwean-German rapper Carlprit was featured, rapping throughout the first and second verse while Horler sang the chorus.

=== Songs ===
“San Francisco” is a song written as a tribute to the city San Francisco in California, like the hit singles “Empire State of Mind” by American rapper Jay-Z and California Gurls by American pop recording artist Katy Perry. The song has been most notably compared to “California Gurls” in sound, noting the similar floaty synth hook and grinding beats. The second track, “Au revoir,” is an electropop song with influences of glam schlager about how some men put up a front and how it does not faze Horler. “Stalker” is about an infatuation with another person that has left the other partner wanting to be around that one person all day, every day. The song is an electro infused dance cut that features the use of fizzing synthesizers and a drum machine with drums and a piano loop starting off the song. “Night Nurse” is an electropop song that has the recycled beat of “Pyromania” but has an ominous undertone and excessively Auto-Tuned male vocals. The song alludes to a love affair while featuring references to medicine, remedies and chemistry. “Pyromania” is the fourth track on the album and is written about a love for fire. It features a robotic sound, aided by the Auto-Tuned male vocals and the Lady Gaga electro-style, and a “pyro-pyro” hook.

The third song, “Unspoken”, features German rapper Carlprit and is about a mutual attraction between two lovers and their synchronicity with each other. The title track is an electropop song about conformity and the modern standard of beauty. The song features the use of Auto-Tune on Horler's vocals along with bleeping synth effects reminiscent of 1980's electro music. The ninth track from the album, “Sinner On the Dancefloor,” is written about a love affair on the dance floor and features pin-sharp beats produced by the drum machine, thick Eurodance synthesizers, and the Auto-Tune effects on unknown male vocals on the song. “Enemy” is a slinky Euro disco song about a relationship at a standstill. “Hungover” is an obligatory pop ballad with urban influences that resembles the sound of American musician Ryan Tedder’s musical work. The sixth track on the album, “Independence Day”, is a pop song that is influences by rock and hip hop. It features the vocals of German rapper Carlprit and is about a relationship underfire.

== Singles ==
- "Pyromania" was released as the album's first single in Germany on 19 March 2010 by Zooland Records. It was Composed as an electropop song, which features Natalie Horler singing the whole song with guest male vocals speaking the "Pyro-pyro" hook.
- "San Francisco" was released as the album's lead single on 3 June 2011. The song had originally premiered on their official YouTube account in the song's music video on 28 April 2011. The video features Horler with a group of people all dressed as modern-day hippies out on a night in San Francisco for a party, ending with them having a party on a rooftop. "San Francisco" has been met with generally positive review from critics, though it has been constantly compared to Katy Perry's 2010 hit "California Gurls", with allegations that Cascada "ripped-off" Perry in the song. The song has been commercially successful despite these claims, proving to be Cascada's most successful single since "Evacuate the Dancefloor" in Austria where the song has achieved a current peak of number 14 and has also managed to reach number 13 in Germany and 11 in the Netherlands. It was later released in the United States.
- "Au Revoir" is the 3rd overall single from the album. It will be the first single from the album in France. The music video premiered on Clubland TV. It features Natalie and many dancers dressed in a masquerade theme, and they dance all throughout the video. It was released in the UK on 11 October but failed to chart on the top 100, owing to the lack of promotion or airplay. It was later released in Germany and the United States.
- "Night Nurse" was released as the 2nd, but promo-only single from the yet-uncompleted album, late in 2010. It wasn't officially released until "Au Revoir" was dropped as a lead single follow-up, as previously planned. On 16 December 2011 Zooland released "Night Nurse" as a fourth official, and final, single off the album. It has only been released in the United States.

== Track listing ==
No.	Title	Writer(s)	Producer(s)	Length
1.	"San Francisco"	Yann Peifer, Manuel Reuter, Tony Cornelissen	Manuel "Manian" Reuter, Yann "Yanou" Peifer	3:46
2.	"Au Revoir"	Peifer, Reuter, Allan Eshuijs	Reuter, Peifer	3:08
3.	"Unspoken" (with Carlprit)	Peifer, Reuter, Jonathan Kinnear, James Kinnear, Rudi Schwamborn	Reuter, Peifer	3:26
4.	"Pyromania"	Peifer, Reuter, Eshuijs	Reuter, Peifer	3:30
5.	"Enemy"	Peifer, Reuter, Steve Robson	Reuter, Peifer	3:30
6.	"Independence Day" (with Carlprit)	Peifer, Reuter, Andres Ballinas, Schwamborn	Reuter, Peifer, Andres Ballinas*	3:51
7.	"Stalker"	Peifer, Reuter, Eshuijs, Mimoza Blinsson, Alfred Tuohey	Reuter, Peifer, Alfred Tuohey (co.)	3:32
8.	"Night Nurse"	Peifer, Reuter, Cornelissen	Reuter, Peifer	3:22
9.	"Sinner on the Dancefloor"	Peifer, Reuter, Ballinas	Reuter, Peifer	2:56
10.	"Original Me"	Peifer, Reuter, Cornelissen, Nina Peifer	Reuter, Peifer	3:09
11.	"Hungover"	Peifer, Reuter, Jo. Kinnear, Ja. Kinnear, Max Persson, Salar Gorgees	Reuter, Peifer	3:48

Disc 2: Greatest Hits
No.	Title	Writer(s)	Producer(s)	Length
1.	"Everytime We Touch"	Peter Risavy, Maggie Reilly, Stuart MacKillop	Manuel "Manian" Reuter, Yann "Yanou" Peifer	3:19
2.	"What Hurts the Most"	Steve Robson, Jeffrey Steele	Reuter, Peifer	3:38
3.	"Evacuate the Dancefloor"	Peifer, Reuter, Allan Eshuijs	Reuter, Peifer	3:27
4.	"Truly Madly Deeply"	Daniel Jones, Darren Hayes	Reuter, Peifer	2:55
5.	"What Do You Want from Me?"	Peifer, Reuter, Tony Cornelissen	Reuter, Peifer	2:48
6.	"Bad Boy"	Peifer, Reuter	Reuter, Peifer	3:12
7.	"How Do You Do"	Per Gessle	Reuter, Peifer	3:15
8.	"A Neverending Dream"	Alexander Kaiser, Matthias Uhle	Reuter, Peifer	3:23
9.	"Fever"	Peifer, Reuter, Ballinas	Reuter, Peifer	3:20
10.	"Wouldn't It Be Good"	Nik Kershaw	Reuter, Peifer	3:27
11.	"Dangerous"	Peifer, Reuter, Cornelissen	Reuter, Peifer	2:59
12.	"Because the Night"	Bruce Springsteen, Patti Smith	Reuter, Peifer	3:26
13.	"Faded"	Matthew Gerrard, Jessica Origliasso, Lisa Origliasso, Robbie Nevil	Reuter, Peifer	2:49
14.	"Perfect Day"	Peifer, Reuter, Eshuijs	Reuter, Peifer	3:45
15.	"Last Christmas"	George Michael	Reuter, Peifer	3:52

iTunes bonus track
No.	Title	Length
16.	"Cascada Megamix" ("San Francisco", "Au Revoir", "Night Nurse", "Pyromania", "Unspoken", "Stalker", "Original Me", "Sinner on the Dancefloor", "Enemy", "Hungover", "Independence Day")	5:38

North American version
No.	Title	Writer(s)	Producer(s)	Length
1.	"San Francisco"	Yann Peifer, Manuel Reuter, Tony Cornelissen	Manuel "Manian" Reuter, Yann "Yanou" Peifer	3:49
2.	"Au Revoir"	Peifer, Reuter, Allan Eshuijs	Reuter, Peifer	3:08
3.	"Stalker"	Peifer, Reuter, Eshuijs, Mimoza Blinsson, Alfred Tuohey	Reuter, Peifer, Alfred Tuohey*	3:32
4.	"Night Nurse"	Peifer, Reuter, Cornelissen	Reuter, Peifer	3:23
5.	"Pyromania"	Peifer, Reuter, Eshuijs	Reuter, Peifer	3:30
6.	"Unspoken" (featuring Carlprit)	Peifer, Reuter, Jonathan Kinnear, James Kinnear, Rudi Schwamborn	Reuter, Peifer	3:26
7.	"Original Me"	Peifer, Reuter, Cornelissen, Nina Peifer	Reuter, Peifer	3:09
8.	"Sinner on the Dancefloor"	Peifer, Reuter, Ballinas	Reuter, Peifer	2:56
9.	"Enemy"	Peifer, Reuter, Steve Robson	Reuter, Peifer	3:30
10.	"Hungover"	Peifer, Reuter, Jo. Kinnear, Ja. Kinnear, Max Persson, Salar Gorgees	Reuter, Peifer	3:49
11.	"Independence Day" (featuring Carlprit)	Peifer, Reuter, Andres Ballinas, Schwamborn	Reuter, Peifer, Andres Ballinas*	3:51
Total length:				38:03

== Chart performance ==
The album peaked 46 in Austria, 44 in Switzerland and 24 in the UK becoming the band's lowest chart position in those countries. The album peaked 41 in their home country, Germany, becoming their second lowest charting album there.

=== Charts ===
Chart (2011)	Peak position
Austrian Albums (Ö3 Austria)	46
German Albums (Offizielle Top 100)	41
Scottish Albums (Official Charts)	17
Swiss Albums (Schweizer Hitparade)	44
UK Albums (Official Charts)	24
UK Dance Albums (Official Charts)	2

== Certifications ==
Certifications for Original Me
Region	Certification	Certified units/sales
Denmark (IFPI Danmark)	Gold	10,000^{‡}
United Kingdom (BPI)	Silver	60,000^{‡}
^{‡} Sales+streaming figures based on certification alone.

== Release history ==
Region	Date	Format	Label
Netherlands	17 June 2011	CD, digital download	Zooland Records, Universal Music
United Kingdom	19 June 2011	CD, digital download	All Around the World
Germany	24 June 2011	CD, digital download	Zooland Records, Universal Music
Spain	20 June 2011	CD, digital download	Zooland Records, Universal Music
Canada	5 July 2011	CD, digital download (Single Disc)	Zooland Records, Universal Music
Australia	8 July 2011	CD, digital download	Zooland Records, Universal Music
United States	29 November 2011	Digital download	Zooland Records, Universal Music
