= Natalie Horler =

Musician, singer, songwriter, and television presenter (born 1981)

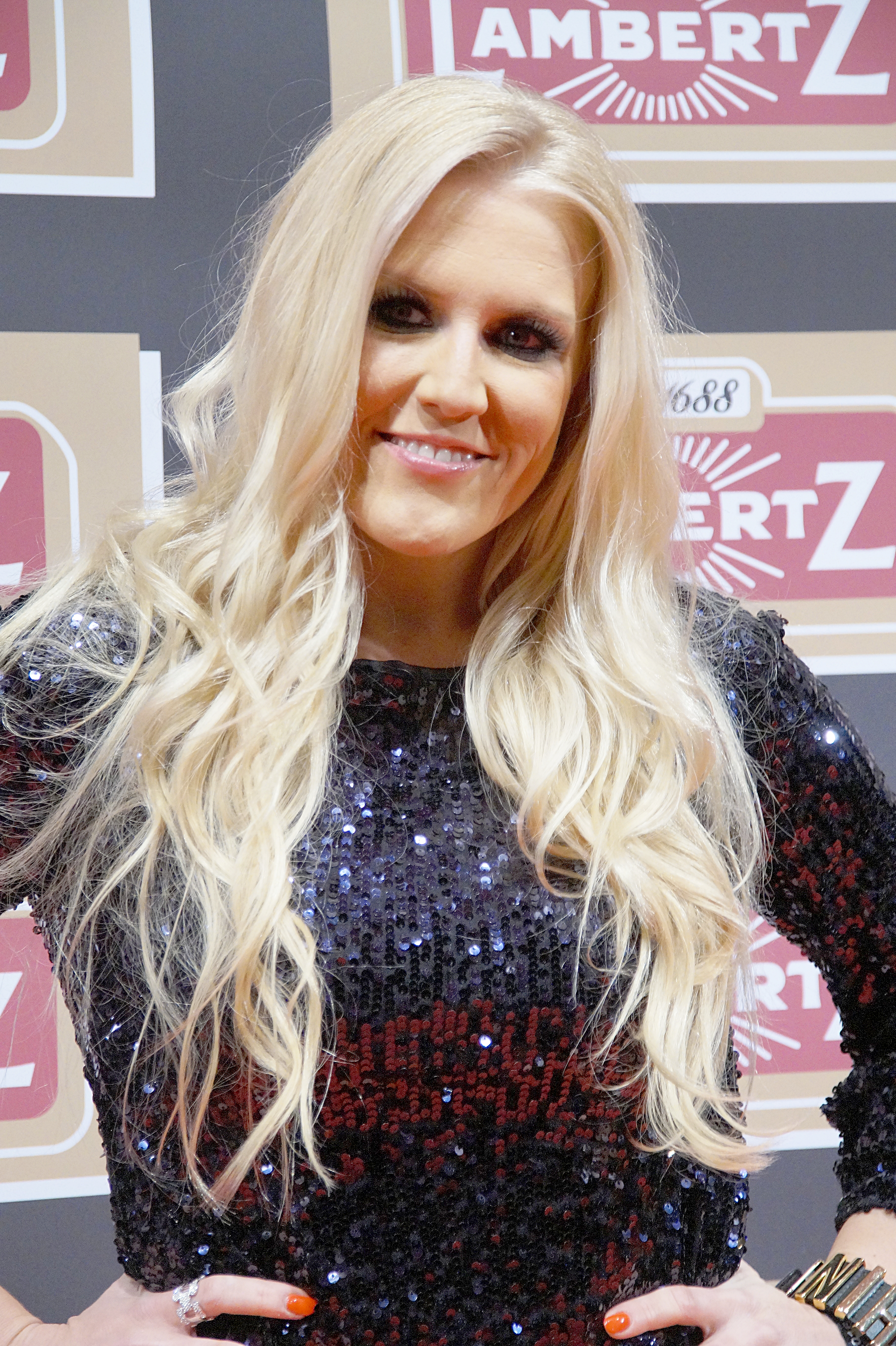
- Horler in 2016
- Born: 23 September 1981 (age 44); Bonn, North Rhine-Westphalia, West Germany
- Occupations: Singer; songwriter; television presenter
- Years active: 2004–present
- Spouse: Moritz Raffelberg (m. 2011)
- Children: 1
- Father: David Horler
- Relatives: John Horler (uncle)
- Musical career
- Genres: Eurodance
- Instrument: Vocals
- Member of: Cascada

Natalie Horler (born 23 September 1981) is a singer, songwriter, and television presenter, best known for being the lead singer of the Eurodance group Cascada.

== Early life and family ==
Natalie Horler was born in 1981 in Bonn, West Germany, to English parents. Her father, David Horler, is a jazz trombonist who had moved to Germany to be a musician there, while her mother, Christine, is a foreign language teacher. Horler grew up with her two siblings, Sally and Victoria, and also has a half-brother and a half-sister. Her uncle is English jazz pianist John Horler.

== Musical career ==
=== Beginnings ===
Horler took singing lessons from the age of 14 and started singing at cocktail bars around Bonn thereafter. By 17, she had landed her first studio gig, and at 18, she started to work with different DJs and recorded several tracks. This is how she met future band members Manian and Yanou. The most notable song of her pre-Cascada era is "Piece of Heaven" as Akira.

In addition, Horler appeared on the German adaptation of Star Search in 2004.

=== Cascada ===
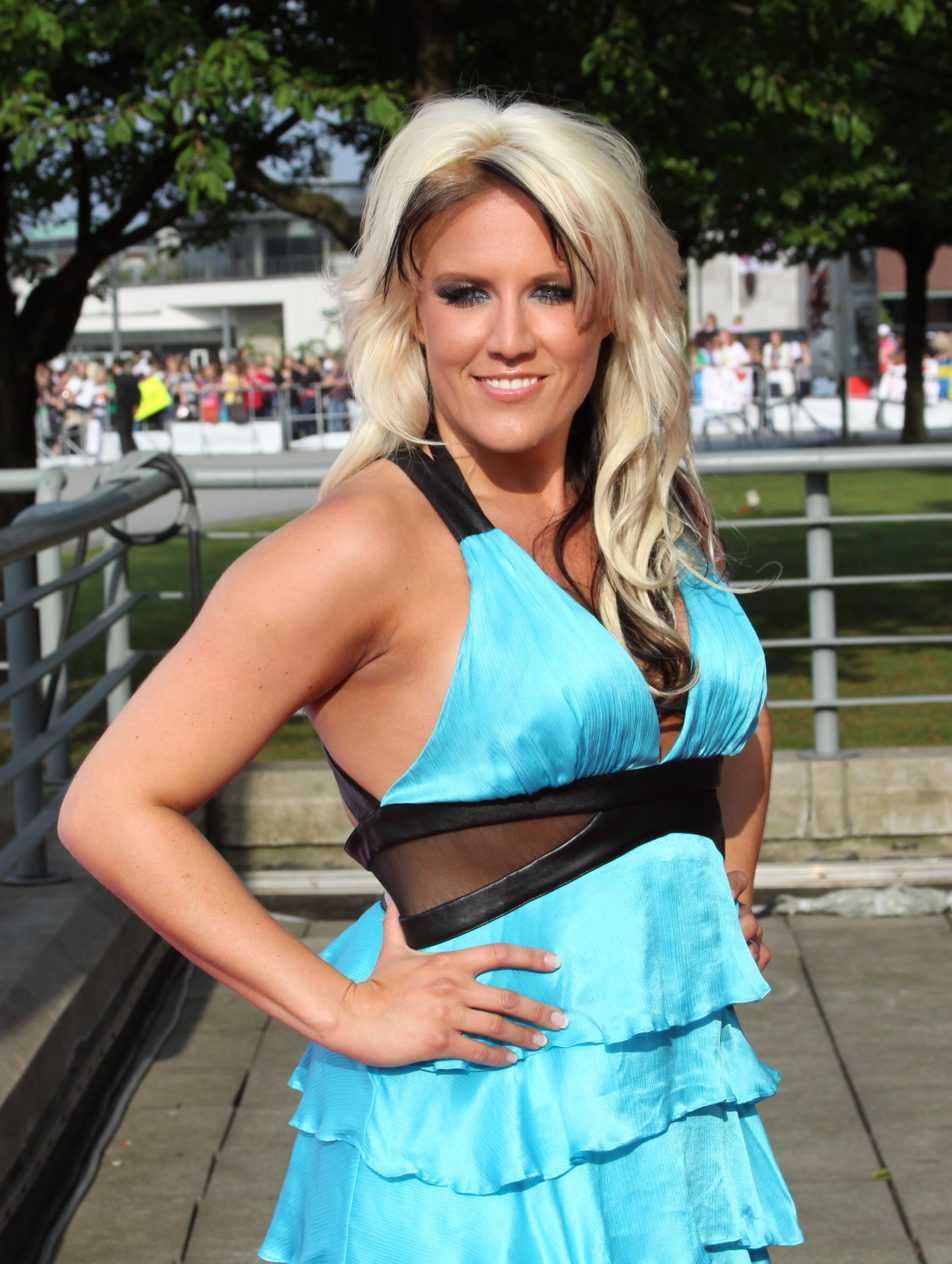
Horler in Berlin in 2010

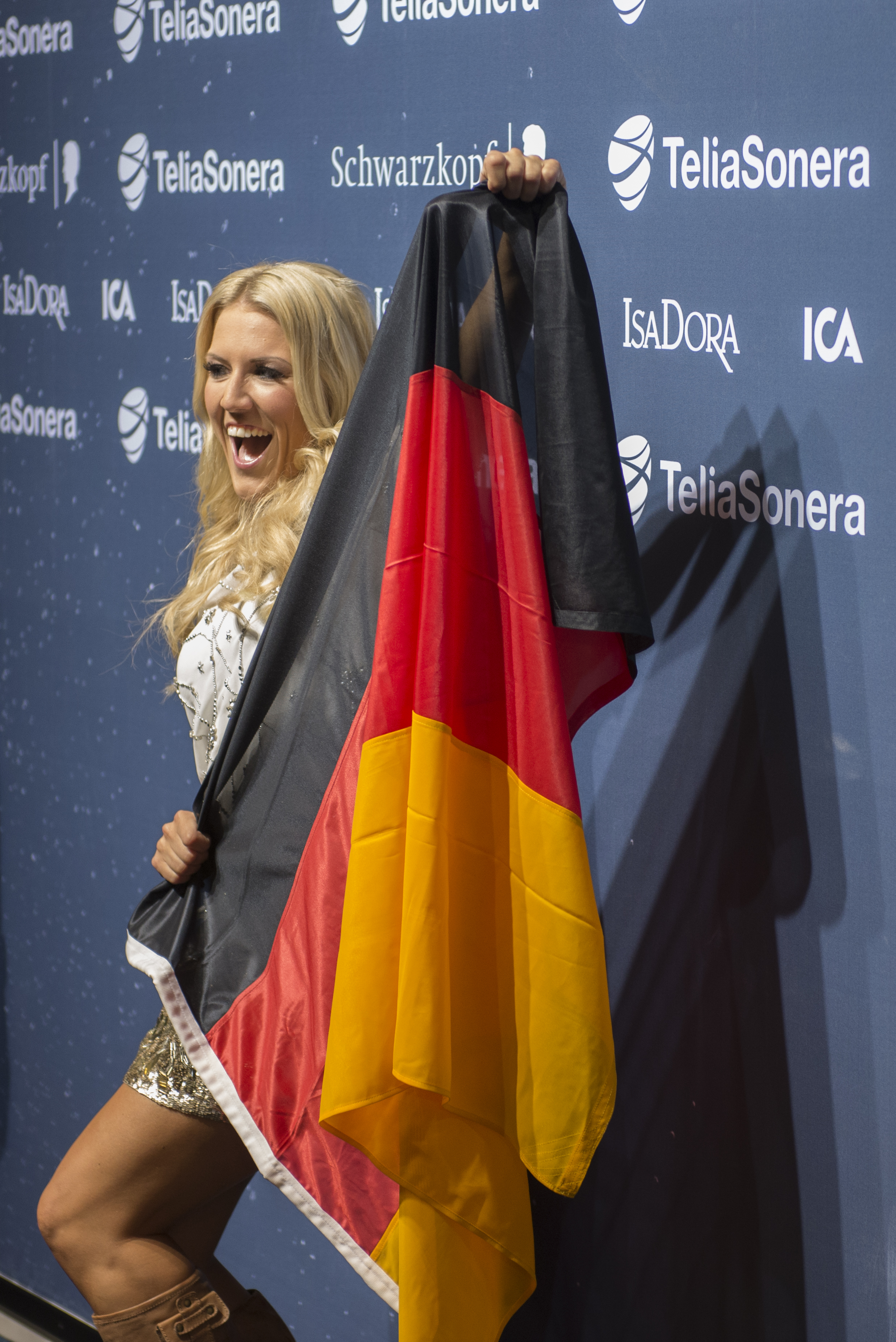
Horler holding the flag of Germany during the Eurovision Song Contest 2013 in Malmö.

In 2002, Natalie Horler formed the group Cascada with DJ Manian and Yanou (the latter known for his track with DJ Sammy and singer Do, Heaven, released in 2001), and began touring with her dancers Essa and Falk. Originally Cascade, the group name was soon changed to Cascada due to legal issues.

On February 21, 2006, Cascada's 14-track debut studio album titled Everytime We Touch was released in the United States. Her most successful song in the US remains the band's US debut single "Everytime We Touch". It was a worldwide hit, peaking at No. 10 on the US Hot 100. In addition, it peaked at No. 2 in the UK Charts and No. 1 in Ireland for six weeks. Horler has stated that at that time, they were overwhelmed by their success, suggesting they came along at the right time, and were very lucky (particularly in the American market, where Eurodance music rarely achieves mainstream chart success). The success of the album gained them a World Music Award, winning them World's Best Selling German Artist in 2007. Other well-known Cascada songs include "Bad Boy", "Miracle", "Evacuate the Dancefloor", and covers such as "Truly Madly Deeply" and "What Hurts the Most".

The band's second studio album, Perfect Day, was released on 3 December 2007. The album charted across Europe, peaking at No. 9 in the UK Album Charts. The single "What Hurts the Most" was a success in Canada, Germany, and the US. It climbed to No. 10 in the UK Charts and did even better in the Swedish charts, peaking at No. 5. But its highest peak was in France at No. 2, the same position it first entered. It also peaked at No. 3 in the Austrian Singles Charts. Other singles from the album include "Faded", "What Do You Want From Me?", and "Because the Night".

In July 2009 Cascada's third studio album, Evacuate the Dancefloor, was released in the United Kingdom. It spawned one of their most successful singles, "Evacuate the Dancefloor", which reached No. 1 in the UK and the Netherlands. The album itself made it to No. 8 in the UK Albums Chart and No. 7 in the U.S. Billboard Dance/Electronic Albums. Other singles from this album include "Fever", which had no physical release and failed to chart in the UK. However, the single reached No. 18 in the Slovak Airplay Chart and No. 3 in the UK Dance Chart. The final single from this album was "Dangerous" which made it to No. 10 in the Finnish Singles Chart and No. 67 in the UK Singles Chart.

Cascada released a new single, "Pyromania", on March 19, 2010; it was the group's least successful lead single to date, failing to reach the Top 40 in the UK. It did, however, reach the Top 20 in France. "San Francisco" was the next single from the album, and continued the group's new electropop direction. The single made the Top 20 in Austria, Germany, and the Netherlands. The release of these two singles was preceded by the release of their fourth studio album, Original Me, which was released on 20 June 2011, their lowest-selling album, reaching No. 24 in the UK Albums Chart. The next single from the album was "Au Revoir" which failed to make much impact on any major chart, as did the final single, "Night Nurse".

On March 20, 2012, Cascada released a new single, "Summer of Love". This single was a return to Cascada's earlier dance sounds and improved declining sales, reaching the Top 20 in Austria, Belgium, Germany, and Switzerland. The group then released a compilation album called Back on the Dancefloor. A next single by the music project was released on 22 July 2012, a cover of "The Rhythm of the Night" of Italian Eurodance group Corona which was the lead single from their compilation album titled The Best of Cascada, in 2013. Cascada's single It's Christmas Time was released on 30 November 2012.

Horler received her first official songwriting credit on the 2024 album Studio 24, contributing to three original tracks by Cascada. Notably, Studio 24 did not feature longtime record producers and DJs Manian and Yanou, as Natalie Horler had expressed a desire to focus temporarily on independent musical projects. After the album release, Horler confirmed on Instagram that both producers had left Cascada, stating that the act now functions as her solo project, while adding that she remained open to collaborating with Manian again in the future.

== Television work ==
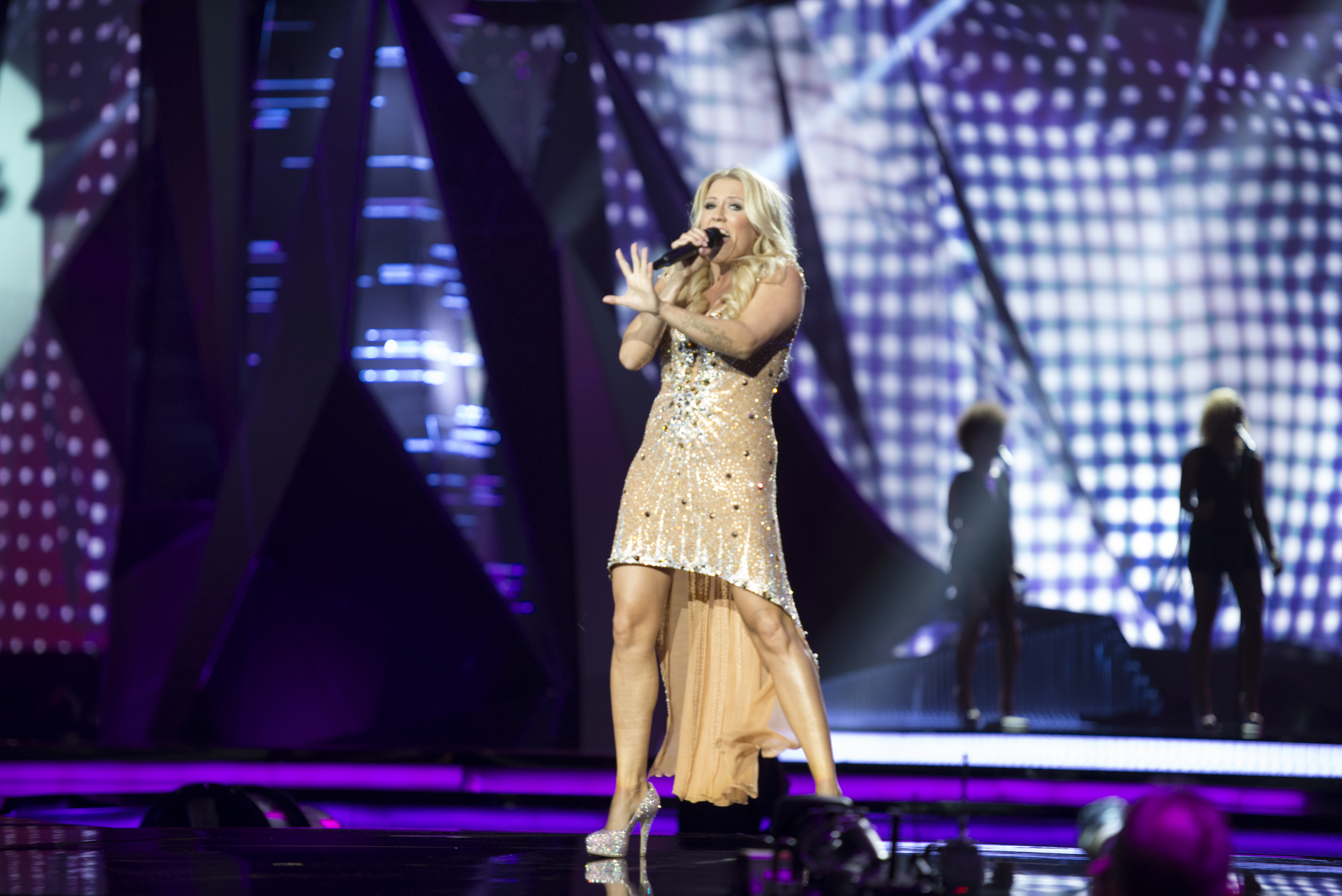
Horler performing in 2013

In late 2006, Horler made her first foray into television as the guest host of the viewer request show Back @ Ya on bpm:tv, a Toronto-based cable channel that broadcasts all across Canada and some parts of the United States. bpm:TV specializes in playing dance and electronica music videos.

Also in 2006, she appeared on Live with Regis and Kelly to promote her album, Everytime We Touch.

She has also presented The Clubland Top 50, exclusively for the music channel 4Music, and has performed on many television shows, mainly in Europe. One of these was promoting the UK version of Perfect Day on the UK breakfast show GMTV in 2007, performing "Last Christmas" live. Horler then returned to GMTV on 28 July 2008, performing "Because the Night" live.

She returned to the GMTV studios in June 2009 to perform her new single "Evacuate the Dancefloor" with Carlprit. Horler has also made numerous appearances on The Dome, mostly to perform Cascada's latest singles, although she did a one-off performance with her co-stars during the 52nd installment, where she covered Heal the World.

In 2012, Horler was one of the new judges for the ninth season of Deutschland sucht den Superstar.

== Personal life ==
Since 11 May 2011, Horler has been married to the banker Moritz Raffelberg; they were privately married in Italy, with Horler wearing a dress she had designed herself. Their daughter was born on 21 September 2015.

Horler appeared on the cover of the August 2011 German issue of Playboy magazine.
