= Siria =

German trance duo

- Origin: Bonn, Germany
- Genres: Trance
- Years active: 2004–2005; 2008
- Labels: Aqualoop (2004–2005), Zooland (2008)
- Members: DJ Manian (2004–2005, 2008)
- Past members: Natalie Horler (2004–2005)
- Website: http://www.manian.de/

Siria is a German trance group composed of singer Natalie Horler and producer DJ Manian, who have also collaborated with Cascada. The Siria project has had two singles released into the German and Canadian markets featuring the vocals of Natalie Horler. On July 3, 2008, a cover of Mylène Farmer's song Désenchantée was released by Zooland Records featuring a new vocalist.

== Career ==
=== "Endless Summer" ===
"Endless Summer" was released as the first single of the Siria project,. When it was first released to DJs in December 2004, it introduced the music style that would prove very successful for the Cascada project with Everytime We Touch in 2005. Initially, fans of Cascada assumed that the group had changed their name to Siria due to legal problems with the name Cascada (they had previously been called Cascade until Kaskade threatened a lawsuit), though it was soon understood that this was just a side project of Manuel Reuter (DJ Manian) and Natalie Horler, without Yanou.

=== "I Will Believe It" ===
In early 2005, Siria released "I Will Believe It" on the "Endless Summer"/"I Will Believe It" 12" single. There are two mixes of the song. The first is a Euro-Trance version, which is similar to DJ Manian and Natalie's other single Reason released by another one of their projects, Diamond. The other remix is the "Cascada Remix", which has a darker but similar style to the then-recently released Everytime We Touch. The U.S. release of the single comes with eight mixes featuring DJ Lenny B, Solar City and is available through Marian Records, Inc. The single peaked at #23 on Billboard's Hot Dance Club Play chart.

=== "Désenchantée" ===
The Siria name was once again used for a new single featuring a new vocalist, a cover of French singer Mylène Farmer's hit song "Désenchantée", released by Zooland Records in Germany on July 3, 2008.

== Mislabelings ==
Initially, Siria's songs were commonly mislabeled as Cascada's, due to Manian's production and Horler's vocals leading to similarity in musical style. This was complicated further by the inclusion of Siria's first two singles on Cascada's second album Perfect Day.

== Siria's future ==
With the immense success of the Cascada project worldwide, DJ Manian announced that there were no planned Siria singles for the near future. In the United Kingdom, both Siria songs were released under the Cascada name on Cascada's second album, Perfect Day, both in slightly edited forms in 2007. Due to both songs being previously released in the United States by Marian Records under the Siria name, I Will Believe It and Endless Summer were not included in the American release of Perfect Day, which instead featured exclusive songs not initially available in any other markets. However, I Will Believe It and Endless Summer are included, under the Siria name, on the dance compilation album Max Dance 07 Volume 1.

In July 2008, the Siria name was brought back into use with the single "Desenchantee", though it does not feature Natalie Horler on vocals.
