= Au Revoir (Cascada song) =

Single by Cascada

from the album Original Me
- Released: 23 September 2011
- Recorded: 2011
- Genre: Dance-pop; electropop
- Length: 3:08
- Label: Zooland
- Songwriters: Yann Peifer; Manuel Reuter; Allan Eshuijs
- Producers: DJ Manian; Yanou

Cascada singles chronology
"San Francisco" (2011)	"Au Revoir" (2011)	"Night Nurse" (2011)

Music video
- "Au Revoir" on YouTube

"Au Revoir" is a song performed by German dance recording trio Cascada. It was produced by Yann Peifer and Manuel Reuter, who also co-wrote the song with Allan Eshuijs, for the band's fourth studio album Original Me (2011). The song serves as the second single (and third overall) from the album, on 23 September 2011 through Zooland Records in Germany. Musically, the song is a fast-paced electropop that features the use of Auto-Tune and bass instruments, and the lyrics are about being unimpressed with a man that presents himself as bigger than life.

The song was met with generally positive reviews from critics, with the majority of them praising its experimental sound. "Au Revoir" peaked at number 73 on the German Singles Chart and at number 31 on the Austrian Singles Chart. The accompanying music video was directed by Lex Halaby and Lisa Mann, and choreographed by Luther Brown. The video's premise portrays Horler at a warehouse masquerade party.

== Composition ==
The sound of the song was compared to the work of American dance pop recording artist Britney Spears. It has similarities in sound mainly with “If U Seek Amy”, an electropop song from Spears's 2008 album Circus famous for its double entendre and its homophonic name. The song has an uptempo sound and was lyrically about being put off by a man who elevates himself to high status. The song is composed as an electronic pop song with some elements of Europop music and lasts for three minutes and eight seconds. “Au revoir” features the influence of glam schlager and the use of synthesizers, bass drums and a heavy bassline.

== Music video ==
In 2011, the music video of "Au Revoir", was premiered in the United Kingdom on Clubland TV. It features Natalie Horler and many dancers attending an underground party. There are many shots of Horler walking down a corridor with her taunting some of the male dancers until finally persuading one of them to follow her. It then features Horler and that dancer doing some tango-style dancing with masquerade masks before she starts dancing with the other female dancers. As it gets to the final chorus, it shows shots of Horler singing in front of a mirror and the other dancers dancing in the corridor. Eventually, Horler and the female dancers leave, ending the video with a shot of Horler winking at the camera.

== UK chart performance ==
Due to a major lack of airplay, multiple cancelled concerts and no TV performances, "Au Revoir" became Cascada's second single to not reach the UK Singles Chart, after "Fever".

== Track listing ==
Digital download
No.	Title	Length
1.	"Au Revoir" (Radio Edit)	3:08
2.	"Au Revoir" (DJ Gollum Radio Edit)	3:28
3.	"Au Revoir" (Mondo Radio Edit)	3:26
4.	"Au Revoir" (DJ Gollum Remix)	4:56
5.	"Au Revoir" (Mondo Remix)	5:31
6.	"Au Revoir" (Jorg Schmid Remix)	4:40
7.	"Au Revoir" (Christian Davies Remix)	5:22

== Chart performance ==
Chart (2011)	Peak position
Austria (Ö3 Austria Top 40)	31
Germany (GfK)	73

== Release history ==
Country	Date	Format	Label
Germany	23 September 2011	Digital download	Zooland
United Kingdom	9 October 2011	Digital download	AATW
United States	15 November 2011	Digital download	Zooland
