= Au Revoir =

Au Revoir may refer to:

- "Au revoir", a French parting phrase

== Music ==
- "Au Revoir", a song from the 1967 musical Sherry!
- "Au Revoir", a 1982 song by Alain Morisod and Sweet People
- "Au Revoir", a 1979 song by Noël 1979
- "Au Revoir", a 1954 song by Teresa Brewer
- Au Revoir (Malice Mizer song), 1997
- "Au Revoir", a song by OneRepublic on the 2013 album Native
- "Au Revoir", a track on the 2008 album Flight of the Conchords
- Au Revoir (Cascada song), 2011
- "Au Revoir", a 2014 song by Mark Forster featuring Sido

== Others ==
- "Au Revoir", the two part Christmas special of Auf Wiedersehen, Pet
- Au Revoir, a character of one half of identical twin duo Bonjour and Au Revoir in Let's Go Luna!
