= Blink (U.V.U.K. song) =

2012 single by U.V.U.K.

Single by U.V.U.K.
- Released: March 27, 2012
- Genre: Dance-pop
- Length: 3:50
- Label: Robbins
- Songwriters: Eric Sanicola; Damon Sharpe; Shanna Crooks
- Producers: Eric Sanicola; Damon Sharpe

U.V.U.K. singles chronology
"Forever" (2011)	"Blink" (2012)

"Blink" is a song by English dance-pop duo U.V.U.K. It was released as the group's second single on March 27, 2012, through Robbins Entertainment. The song was written by Eric Sanicola, Damon Sharpe, and Shanna Crooks, and produced by Sanicola and Sharpe. The lyrics of the song are about enjoying and making the best of life and not wanting to miss any of it.

== Track listing ==
- Digital download
1. "Blink" – 3:50
2. "Blink" (extended) – 5:11

== Cascada version ==
"Blink"

Single by Cascada
- Released: 28 March 2014
- Recorded: 2013
- Genre: Progressive house
- Length: 3:51
- Label: Zooland; Kontor
- Songwriters: Eric Sanicola; Damon Sharpe; Shanna Crooks
- Producers: Manuel "Manian" Reuter; Yann "Yanou" Peifer

Cascada singles chronology
"The World Is in My Hands" (2013)	"Blink" (2014)	"Madness" (2014)

In 2014, "Blink" was covered by German dance act Cascada. The single was released on March 28, 2014.

=== Background ===
On 12 December 2013, German DJ and producer CJ Stone revealed that he was working on a remix for the latest Cascada release. He shared with eager fans that the single is titled "Blink" and would be released in early 2014. The track was originally recorded and released by pop group U.V.U.K. in 2012. However the single was not commercially a success, so it was given to Cascada to release.

=== Music video ===
On 10 January 2014, Cascada lead singer Natalie Horler posted on Facebook that they were busy planning the music video for the new single. On 15 January 2014, she posted that they were getting ready for the video shoot. Horler posted a teaser of the video on 12 March 2014, and the full video premiered on 27 March 2014.

The video starts off with Horler singing to the screen in numerous positions on a completely white background, using many hand gestures. She is then shown singing the song and doing moves in various different areas, including a box-like area, at times interspersed with other dancers.

=== Track listing ===
German & Australian digital download
No.	Title	Length
1.	"Blink" (Video Edit)	3:51
2.	"Blink" (Extended Mix)	5:09
3.	"Blink" (Crew Cardinal Radio Edit)	3:10
4.	"Blink" (Crew Cardinal Remix)	4:07
5.	"Blink" (Jerome Radio Edit)	3:41
6.	"Blink" (Jerome Remix)	5:12
7.	"Blink" (CJ Stone Radio Edit)	3:15
8.	"Blink" (CJ Stone Remix)	4:41
9.	"Blink" (House of Titans Radio Edit)	3:31
10.	"Blink" (House of Titans Remix)	5:20

US digital download
No.	Title	Length
1.	"Blink" (Radio Edit)	3:52
2.	"Blink" (Jerome Edit)	3:41
3.	"Blink" (House of Titans Edit)	3:21
4.	"Blink" (CJ Stone Edit)	3:15
5.	"Blink" (Crew Cardinal Edit)	3:10
6.	"Blink" (Extended)	5:09
7.	"Blink" (Jerome Mix)	5:12
8.	"Blink" (House of Titans Mix)	5:20
9.	"Blink" (CJ Stone Mix)	4:41
10.	"Blink" (Crew Cardinal Mix)	4:07

British digital download
No.	Title	Length
1.	"Blink" (Video Edit)	3:51
2.	"Blink" (Crew Cardinal Radio Edit)	3:10
3.	"Blink" (Jerome Radio Edit)	3:41
4.	"Blink" (CJ Stone Radio Edit)	3:15
5.	"Blink" (House of Titans Radio Edit)	3:21
6.	"Blink" (Extended Mix)	5:09
7.	"Blink" (Crew Cardinal Remix)	4:07
8.	"Blink" (Jerome Remix)	5:12
9.	"Blink" (CJ Stone Remix)	4:41
10.	"Blink" (House of Titans Remix)	5:20

French digital download
No.	Title	Length
1.	"Blink" (Video Edit)	3:51
2.	"Blink" (Extended Mix)	5:09

=== Charts ===
Chart (2014)	Peak position
US Hot Dance/Electronic Songs (Billboard)	34

=== Release history ===
Region	Date	Format	Label
Germany	28 March 2014	Digital download	Kontor Records
Romania	28 March 2014	Digital download	Cat Music
United Kingdom	28 March 2014	Digital download	Zooland Records
Greece	28 March 2014	Digital download	Zooland Records
Italy	28 March 2014	Digital download	Zooland Records
Japan	2 April 2014	Digital download	Zooland Records
Australia	4 April 2014	Digital download	Central Station Records
New Zealand	4 April 2014	Digital download	Central Station Records
Norway	4 April 2014	Digital download	Catchy Tunes/Family Tree Music
Sweden	4 April 2014	Digital download	Catchy Tunes/Family Tree Music
Finland	4 April 2014	Digital download	Catchy Tunes/Family Tree Music
Belgium	7 April 2014	Digital download	Spinnin Records
The Netherlands	7 April 2014	Digital download	Spinnin Records
Poland	8 April 2014	Digital download	Magic Records
France	14 April 2014	Digital download	Happy Music
South Africa	21 April 2014	Digital download	David Gresham Records
Kenya	21 April 2014	Digital download	David Gresham Records
United States	6 May 2014	Digital download	Robbins Entertainment
Mexico	6 May 2014	Digital download	Robbins Entertainment
Russia	6 May 2014	Digital download	JSC-SBA Production
Canada	27 May 2014	Digital download	Zooland Records
