= John Horler =

English jazz pianist

John Douglas Horler (born 26 February 1947) is an English jazz pianist. He is the younger brother of jazz musician David Horler and the uncle of Natalie Horler, lead singer in the band Cascada.

Horler was born in Lymington. He began on piano at age six, and learned jazz from his father, a trumpeter. He studied at the Royal Academy of Music (1963–67), then played with the big bands of Bobby Lamb, Ray Premru, BBC Radio, Dave Hancock, and Maynard Ferguson. He worked with Tommy Whittle for much of the 1970s, Tony Coe later in the decade, Ronnie Ross for several years in the 1980s, Peter King in the late 1980s and early 1990s, and Jimmy Hastings around the same time as King. He led small groups intermittently and accompanied John Dankworth and Kenny Wheeler on record.
