= Pyromania (song) =

Single by Cascada

from the album Original Me
- Released: March 19, 2010
- Recorded: 2009
- Genre: Europop; electropop
- Length: 3:31
- Label: Zooland
- Songwriters: Yann Peifer; Allan Eshuijs; Manuel Reuter
- Producers: Manuel "Manian" Reuter; Yann Peifer

Cascada singles chronology
"Dangerous" (2009)	"Pyromania" (2010)	"San Francisco" (2011)

Music video
- "Pyromania" on YouTube

"Pyromania" is a song performed by German Eurodance group Cascada, released as the first single from their fourth studio album, Original Me. It was written by Yann Peifer, Allan Eshuijs, and Manuel Reuter, and it was produced by Reuter and Peifer. The song was premiered on February 12, 2010, and was first released on March 19, 2010, by Zooland Records. "Pyromania" features Natalie Horler singing the whole song with guest male vocals speaking the "pyro-pyro" hook. Lyrically, the song is a play on words. It talks about a love and obsession with fire.

"Pyromania" garnered moderate chart success for Cascada; reaching the top forty in Austria, Czech Republic, France, Germany, The Netherlands and Scotland. The music video premiered on February 17, 2010, on British television station Clubland TV. It features Natalie Horler in different scenes in which she is by herself and with backup dancers, singing and dancing in front of futuristic space balls and fire explosions. Cascada performed "Pyromania" live on German television program The Dome and at The 2010 Pepsi B96 Summerbash.

== Music video ==
The music video premiered on the evening of February 17, 2010 on Clubland's YouTube. It shows Natalie in different scenes in which she is by herself and with backup dancers. One scene shows her singing in front of futuristic space balls, and another scene shows her dancing while an explosion takes up one half of the screen. The clip was filmed in Toronto, Canada.

== Formats and listings ==
These are the formats and track listings of major single releases of "Pyromania":

- German CD Single
1. "Pyromania" (Radio Edit) – 3:31
2. "Pyromania" (Spencer & Hill Airplay Mix) – 5:40
- German Digital EP
1. "Pyromania" (Radio Edit) – 3:31
2. "Pyromania" (Spencer & Hill Airplay Mix) – 5:40
3. "Pyromania" (Extended Mix) – 5:31
4. "Pyromania" (Cahill Remix) – 6:17
5. "Pyromania" (Dan Winter Remix) – 5:32
- UK Digital Single
1. "Pyromania" (Radio Edit) – 3:31
2. "Pyromania" (Cahill Remix) – 6:17
- U.S. Digital EP
1. "Pyromania" (Radio Edit) – 3:31
2. "Pyromania" (Wideboys Radio Edit) – 3:06
3. "Pyromania" (Cahill Radio Edit) – 3:26
4. "Pyromania" (Spencer & Hill Radio Edit) – 3:39
5. "Pyromania" (Dan Winter Radio Edit) – 3:44
6. "Pyromania" (Frisco Radio Edit) – 3:13
7. "Pyromania" (Extended Mix) – 5:31
8. "Pyromania" (Wideboys Remix) – 7:34
9. "Pyromania" (Cahill Remix) – 6:17
10. "Pyromania" (Spencer & Hill Airplay Mix) – 5:40
11. "Pyromania" (Dan Winter Remix) – 5:32
12. "Pyromania" (Frisco Remix) – 5:28
- U.S. Digital EP (Re-Release)
1. "Pyromania" (Video Edit) - 3:29
2. "Pyromania" (Spencer & Hill Airplay Radio Edit) - 3:37
3. "Pyromania" (Dan Winter Radio Edit) - 3:42
4. "Pyromania" (Wideboys Radio Edit) - 3:04
5. "Pyromania" (Cahill Radio Edit) - 3:24
6. "Pyromania" (Frisco Radio Edit) - 3:11
7. "Pyromania" (Extended Mix) - 5:29
8. "Pyromania" (Spencer & Hill Remix) - 5:38
9. "Pyromania" (Dan Winter Remix) - 5:30
10. "Pyromania" (Wideboys Remix) - 7:32
11. "Pyromania" (Cahill Remix) - 6:14
12. "Pyromania" (Frisco Remix) - 5:28
- Australian Digital EP
1. "Pyromania" (Radio Edit) – 3:31
2. "Pyromania" (Spencer & Hill Airplay Mix) – 5:40
3. "Pyromania" (Extended Mix) – 5:31
4. "Pyromania" (Cahill Remix) – 6:17
5. "Pyromania" (Dan Winter Remix) – 5:32
6. "Pyromania" (Wideboys Remix) – 7:34
7. "Pyromania" (Music Video) – 3:39

== Release History ==
Country	Release date	Record label
Germany	16 March 2010	Zooland
United Kingdom	3 May 2010	AATW
United States	16 December 2011	Zooland
France	2 August 2010	Zooland

== Charts ==
=== Weekly charts ===
Chart (2010)	Peak position
Austria (Ö3 Austria Top 40)	26
Canada Hot 100 (Billboard)	93
Czech Republic Airplay (ČNS IFPI)	32
European Hot 100 Singles (Billboard)	35
France (SNEP)	11
Germany (GfK)	21
Netherlands (Dutch Top 40)	29
Poland (Dance Top 50)	23
Scottish Singles Sales (Official Charts)	38
UK Dance (Official Charts)	8
UK Singles (Official Charts)	60
US Dance Airplay (Billboard)	19

=== Year-end charts ===
Chart (2010)	Position
France (SNEP)	93
