= Evacuate the Dancefloor (song) =

2009 single by Cascada

Single by Cascada

from the album Evacuate the Dancefloor
- Released: 29 June 2009
- Recorded: 2008
- Studio: Plazmatek (Cologne)
- Genre: Electropop; dance-pop
- Length: 3:26
- Label: All Around the World; Robbins
- Songwriters: Yann Peifer; Allan Eshuijs; Manuel Reuter
- Producers: DJ Manian; Yanou

Cascada singles chronology
"Perfect Day" (2009)	"Evacuate the Dancefloor" (2009)	"Fever" (2009)

Audio sample
- file; help

"Evacuate the Dancefloor" is a song by German group Cascada from their third studio album of the same name. The song features a rap by Afro-German rapper Carlprit and was released as the album's lead single on 29 June 2009.

The song peaked at number five on the German Singles Chart. Outside Germany, the single topped the charts in the Netherlands and the United Kingdom. It also became the act's third number-one single on the US Billboard Hot Dance Airplay chart and second top forty hit on the US Billboard Hot 100, following 2006's "Everytime We Touch". The single peaked within the top ten of the charts in several countries such as Australia, Canada, France, Germany, New Zealand and the Republic of Ireland, and the top thirty in the United States. The track was featured on the Xbox 360 Kinect video game Dance Central, as well as the television advertisements for the game.

== Writing and inspiration ==
Group member Yanou and frequent collaborator Allan Eshuijs wrote the song together at a studio session, with Manuel Reuter taking care of putting the track production together.

Seen as being counter-intuitive for what is a dancefloor-bound song, Eshuijs told HitQuarters that he and Yanou chose the title phrase because they simply wanted to say something a bit different. Having decided the hook line should be "something-something-dancefloor", they managed to complete the phrase by Googling for "nice words and weird combinations of words". They then built the story of the song around it.

== Critical reception ==
The song received positive reviews from music critics. Music House wrote that the track builds "on the Europop sound Cascada pioneered" and described it as a "playful, sexy pop stomper that brings R&B, slinky soul and rap to the group's table for the first time. The track is still a euphoric, arms-in-the-air dancefloor anthem, but this time, its moves are more sophisticated, its sonic tricks cleverer and vocalist Natalie Horler's vocals both more personal and powerful than ever." Digital Spy added that the song is "a bit different from the Eurodance throbathons of old. To our ears, 'Evacuate The Dancefloor' sounds like a mix of Lady GaGa, recent Britney and S Club 7's 'Don't Stop Movin'." DJ Ron Slomowicz of About.com stated: "Known for their uptempo europop singles clocking in at over 140 BPM like 'Everytime We Touch' and 'What Hurts the Most,' Cascada has gone a completely different route with 'Evacuate the Dancefloor.' With a Lady Gaga-like production style and a guest rap from German rapper Carlprit, the song is instantly catchy and will no doubt be embraced by lovers of commercial dance music."

During an interview, lead singer Natalie Horler commented on the single saying "We have definitely developed the Cascada sound." "With Evacuate The Dancefloor, we've taken all we learnt over the last few years and moved on. It's refreshing and fun. I love R 'n' B and I've always had a soulful voice, but I didn't have much opportunity to show that off. This song is more of a challenge for me to sing. I can't wait to take it to the clubs. People's jaws are going to hit the floor when they hear it."

=== Comparison to Lady Gaga ===
Because "Evacuate the Dancefloor" is predominantly electropop rather than one of the group's regular Eurodance anthems, some critics have compared it to Lady Gaga's sound, while others have compared the song to Miley Cyrus's "Party in the U.S.A." in terms of music structure and lyrical content. In an interview with David Balls of Digital Spy, Horler insisted that the song was written before May 2008, stating:

I don't like the term rip-off because it's a bit negative. We started the album [in early to mid 2008] and 'Evacuate' was one of the first songs that we recorded when Lady Gaga wasn't even around. Someone told me they read on the Internet that we actually inspired her. I don't know if it's true, but that would be amazing. We've been around for a long time and we've worked hard for our success, so there's no reason for us to throw away everything that we're respected for. You do evolve and progress and we're very proud of what's come of it.

Co-writer Allan Eshuijs said that Cascada moved from their trademark anthemic Eurodance sound towards electropop because with sales of their second album, Perfect Day, marking a downward turn they decided they had to abandon their formula and do something different.

== Chart performance ==
"Evacuate the Dancefloor" made its chart debut on the Irish Singles Chart for the week ending 25 June 2009 and peaked at number two. The song debuted at number one on the UK Singles Chart for the week ending 11 July 2009, becoming the group's first UK chart-topper, beating Michael Jackson's "Man in the Mirror" to the top spot in the week after his death. It remained at the top in the United Kingdom for two weeks. The song debuted at number three and peaked at number two in New Zealand. It was certified gold in the country after eight weeks on the chart, selling over 7,500 copies. The song also debuted on the German Singles Chart at number six and peaked at number five. The song debuted on the US Billboard Hot 100 at number eighty and peaked at number twenty-five. On the US Billboard Hot Dance Airplay chart, the single went to number one on its 26 September 2009 issue, giving the act their third number-one single on the chart (following 2006's "Everytime We Touch" and 2008's "What Hurts the Most").

== Music video ==
The music video was supposed to premiere on the evening of 17 May 2009 on the Clubland website, but this was postponed due to reported problems in the transportation of the film from Los Angeles to the UK. The video finally premiered the next day on 18 May. On 3 August 2010, the video received a nomination for Best Dance Video at the 2010 MTV Video Music Awards.

The video shows Horler, sporting a dress with a Siouxsie Sioux print, singing in front of lights in a club and surrounded by partygoers. It then shows dancers on a dance floor with Horler singing in front of open doors and people dancing in the background. Carlprit appears singing on some seats before the camera goes back to Horler and the dancers while occasionally showing Carlprit singing the backing vocals. It finishes with Horler singing on a spinning set of seats surrounded by the dancers.

== Track listings ==
- German download release (Amazon MP3/Musicload)
1. "Evacuate the Dancefloor" (Radio Edit)
2. "Evacuate the Dancefloor" (Extended Mix)
3. "Evacuate the Dancefloor" (Wideboys Remix)
4. "Evacuate the Dancefloor" (Chriss Ortega Bigroom Remix)
5. "Evacuate the Dancefloor" (Rob Mayth Remix)
- German iTunes release
1. "Evacuate the Dancefloor" (Radio Edit)
2. "Evacuate the Dancefloor" (Extended Mix)
3. "Evacuate the Dancefloor" (Wideboys Remix)
4. "Evacuate the Dancefloor" (Chriss Ortega Bigroom Remix)
5. "Evacuate the Dancefloor" (Rob Mayth Remix)
6. "Evacuate the Dancefloor" (Frisco Remix)
7. "Evacuate the Dancefloor" (Music Video)
- German download release (Acoustic Mixes) (Amazon MP3)
1. "Evacuate the Dancefloor" (Unplugged)
2. "Evacuate the Dancefloor" (Buena Vista Mix)
- UK iTunes EP 1
1. "Evacuate the Dancefloor" (Radio Edit)
2. "Evacuate the Dancefloor" (Cahill Remix)
3. "Evacuate the Dancefloor" (Wideboys Remix)
4. "Evacuate the Dancefloor" (Ultrabeat Remix)
- UK iTunes EP 2
1. "Evacuate the Dancefloor" (Extended Mix)
2. "Evacuate the Dancefloor" (Rob Mayth Remix)
3. "Evacuate the Dancefloor" (Chriss Ortega Bigroom Remix)
4. "Evacuate the Dancefloor" (Frisco Remix)
- UK/ French digital download release
1. "Evacuate the Dancefloor" (Radio Edit)
2. "Evacuate the Dancefloor" (Extended Mix)
3. "Evacuate the Dancefloor" (Wideboys Remix)
4. "Evacuate the Dancefloor" (Ultrabeat Remix)
5. "Evacuate the Dancefloor" (Rob Mayth Remix)
6. "Evacuate the Dancefloor" (Frisco Remix)
7. "Evacuate the Dancefloor" (Chriss Ortega Bigroom Remix)
- UK/ French CD single
1. "Evacuate the Dancefloor" (Radio Edit)
2. "Evacuate the Dancefloor" (Extended Mix)
- UK club promo CD single
1. "Evacuate the Dancefloor" (Radio Edit)
2. "Evacuate the Dancefloor" (Extended Mix)
3. "Evacuate the Dancefloor" (Lockout's Mirrorball Mix)
4. "Evacuate the Dancefloor" (Wideboys Mix)
5. "Evacuate the Dancefloor" (Ultrabeat Mix)
6. "Evacuate the Dancefloor" (Frisco Mix)
7. "Evacuate the Dancefloor" (Rob Mayth Mix)
8. "Evacuate the Dancefloor" (Wideboys' "Look Who's Back" Dub)
- US maxi CD single
1. "Evacuate the Dancefloor" (Radio Edit)
2. "Evacuate the Dancefloor" (Wideboys Radio Edit)
3. "Evacuate the Dancefloor" (Cahill Edit)
4. "Evacuate the Dancefloor" (Chriss Ortega Bigroom Radio Edit)
5. "Evacuate the Dancefloor" (Extended Mix)
6. "Evacuate the Dancefloor" (Wideboys Remix)
7. "Evacuate the Dancefloor" (Cahill Remix)
8. "Evacuate the Dancefloor" (Chriss Ortega Bigroom Remix)
9. "Evacuate the Dancefloor" (Frisco Remix)
10. "Evacuate the Dancefloor" (Wideboys Dub)
- US iTunes exclusive: The International Mixes (and more)
1. "Evacuate the Dancefloor" (Rob Mayth Edit)
2. "Evacuate the Dancefloor" (Ultrabeat Edit)
3. "Evacuate the Dancefloor" (PH Elektro Edit)
4. "Evacuate the Dancefloor" (Rob Mayth Mix)
5. "Evacuate the Dancefloor" (Ultrabeat Mix)
6. "Evacuate the Dancefloor" (PH Elektro Mix)
7. "Evacuate the Dancefloor" (Lockout's Mirrorball Mix)
8. "Evacuate the Dancefloor" (Unplugged Live!)
9. "Evacuate the Dancefloor" (Buena Vista Edit)
10. "Faded" (Wideboys Miami House Mix)
11. "Just Like a Pill"
12. "Sk8er Boi"

== Charts ==
=== Weekly charts ===
Chart (2009)	Peak position
Australia (ARIA)	3
Australian Dance (ARIA)	2
Austria (Ö3 Austria Top 40)	6
Belgium (Ultratop 50 Flanders)	6
Belgium (Ultratop 50 Wallonia)	4
Canada Hot 100 (Billboard)	4
CIS Airplay (TopHit)	46
Czech Republic Airplay (ČNS IFPI)	25
Denmark (Tracklisten)	7
Europe (European Hot 100 Singles)	4
Finland Download (Latauslista)	29
France (SNEP)	5
Germany (GfK)	5
Hungary (Rádiós Top 40)	18
Hungary (Single Top 40)	8
Ireland (IRMA)	2
Israel International Airplay (Media Forest)	1
Luxembourg Digital Songs (Billboard)	10
Netherlands (Dutch Top 40)	1
Netherlands (Single Top 100)	7
Netherlands (Dance Top 30)	3
New Zealand (Recorded Music NZ)	2
Norway (VG-lista)	3
Russia Airplay (TopHit)	46
Scotland Singles (Official Charts)	1
Slovakia Airplay (ČNS IFPI)	3
Sweden (Sverigetopplistan)	13
Switzerland (Schweizer Hitparade)	7
Ukraine Airplay (TopHit)	12
UK Singles (Official Charts)	1
US Billboard Hot 100	25
US Adult Pop Airplay (Billboard)	36
US Dance Airplay (Billboard)	1
US Pop Airplay (Billboard)	14

2024 Weekly chart performance for "Evacuate the Dancefloor"
Chart (2024)	Peak position
Estonia Airplay (TopHit)	175

=== Year-end charts ===
Chart (2009)	Position
Australia (ARIA)	18
Australian Dance (ARIA)	5
Austria (Ö3 Austria Top 40)	32
Belgium (Ultratop 50 Flanders)	34
Belgium (Ultratop 50 Wallonia)	45
Canada (Canadian Hot 100)	38
Denmark (Tracklisten)	46
Europe (European Hot 100 Singles)	22
France (SNEP)	37
Germany (Official German Charts)	25
Hungary (Rádiós Top 40)	108
Netherlands (Dutch Top 40)	22
Netherlands (Single Top 100)	31
New Zealand (Recorded Music NZ)	22
Sweden (Sverigetopplistan)	84
Switzerland (Schweizer Hitparade)	43
UK Singles (OCC)	31
US Dance/Mix Show Airplay (Billboard)	10

Chart (2010)	Position
Australian Dance (ARIA)	37
Brazil (Crowley)	341
Canada (Canadian Hot 100)	79
Europe (European Hot 100 Singles)	87

=== Decade-end charts ===
Chart (2000–2009)	Position
Australia (ARIA)	89

== Certifications ==
Region	Certification	Certified units/sales
Australia (ARIA)	Platinum	70,000^{^}
Canada (Music Canada)	2× Platinum	160,000^{*}
Denmark (IFPI Danmark)	Gold	15,000^{^}
Germany (BVMI)	Platinum	300,000^{‡}
Netherlands (NVPI)	Gold	10,000^{^}
New Zealand (RMNZ)	Platinum	15,000^{*}
United Kingdom (BPI)	Platinum	600,000^{‡}
United States (RIAA)	Platinum	1,000,000^{*}
^{*} Sales figures based on certification alone.^{^} Shipments figures based on certification alone.^{‡} Sales+streaming figures based on certification alone.

== Release history ==
Region	Date	Format	Label
United Kingdom	29 June 2009	CD single; digital download	All Around the World; Universal TV
Germany	3 July 2009	CD single; digital download	Zooland
Italy	10 July 2009	Airplay	Universal
United States	14 July 2009	Digital download	Robbins
United States	21 July 2009	CD single	Robbins
Italy	31 July 2009	CD single; digital download	Universal
Canada	4 August 2009	Digital download	Awesome; Robbins
Netherlands	10 August 2009	Digital download	Cloud 9
Australia	4 September 2009	CD single; digital download	Universal
Germany	4 September 2009	Digital download (acoustic mixes)	Zooland
France	7 September 2009	CD single; digital download	Universal
United States	15 September 2009	Digital download (international remixes)	Robbins
