= San Francisco (Cascada song) =

Single by Cascada

from the album Original Me
- Released: June 20, 2011
- Recorded: 2011
- Genre: Electropop; dance-pop
- Length: 3:46
- Label: Zooland
- Songwriters: Yann Peifer; Manuel Reuter; Tony Cornelissen; Matthew Langlois
- Producers: Manuel "Manian" Reuter; Yann "Yanou" Peifer

Cascada singles chronology
"Pyromania" (2010)	"San Francisco" (2011)	"Au Revoir" (2011)

Music video
- "San Francisco" on YouTube

"San Francisco" is a song performed by German Eurodance recording group Cascada from their fourth studio album, Original Me. The song serves as the album's official first single (second overall) internationally on June 20, 2011. It was written by Yann Peifer, Manuel Reuter, Tony Cornelissen, and Matthew Langlois and it was produced by Reuter and Peifer. Musically, "San Francisco" is an uptempo pop song which relies on electropop and dance-pop styles with influences of music from the 1970s. The song's lyrics are an ode to the city of San Francisco in Northern California. The song was officially released in the UK for download on July 4, 2011.

"San Francisco" received criticism for its similarity in sound to Katy Perry's song, "California Gurls". Both songs feature the same tempo and chord progression. The song reached the top fifteen in Austria, Germany and the Netherlands. Unlike previous singles from the group, it failed to make any impact on the pop charts in the United Kingdom, peaking at number sixty-four. The song's accompanying music video sees Horler leading a group of dancers dressed as modern-day hippies to an underground party.

== Composition ==
"San Francisco" is an uptempo dance song which derives from the styles of electropop and electronica while backed by a grinding synth beat. The song also has influences from 1970s music - in particular, it makes reference to Scott McKenzie's song by the same name, in one lyric that says, "where you've got flowers in your hair". The song is set in common time, and has a moderate tempo of 126 beats per minute. It is written in the key of D minor and Horler's vocals span from E♭_{3}-C_{5}. The song is lyrically an ode to San Francisco, California. The song's composition has received notability from critics for its similar composition to Katy Perry's song "California Gurls". "San Francisco" is similar to "California Gurls" in its lyrics, as they both pay tribute to the California area and all the good fun that happens there. "San Francisco" and "California Gurls", according to Jon O'Brien of AllMusic Guide, contained the similar floaty synth hook and grinding beats.

== Reception ==
=== Critical reception ===
Jon O'Brien of AllMusic Guide seemed unimpressed with the song, noting "that their ability to borrow from the biggest pop songs of the year remains as shameless as ever."

=== Chart performance ===
"San Francisco" debuted in the Dutch Top 40 charts in the Netherlands at number twenty-seven on the week of July 2, 2011. The song peaked at number eleven seven weeks later, and remained on the charts for seven more weeks after that. The song also debuted and peaked at number thirteen on the Media Control Charts in Germany. The song was also successful in Austria, debuting and peaking at number fourteen on Ö3 Austria Top 75 on the week of June 15, 2011. It lasted eleven weeks on the chart. The single was less successful in other countries, peaking at number sixteen in Bulgaria, number forty in Slovakia, and number sixty-four in the United Kingdom.

== Music video ==
Cascada shot the video for the song on March 26th, 2011 along with the video for "Au Revoir". Both videos were directed by Lisa Mann and choreographed by Luther Brown. The video for the song premiered on May 6, one month before its official release. Although it shows some scenes of San Francisco, it was actually shot in Toronto, Canada, and was, according to their YouTube description of the music video, an expensive production. The reason for having the video filmed in Canada was that of San Francisco being too risky for filming due to weather conditions that time and the high crime rate.

== Track listing ==
UK digital download
No.	Title	Length
1.	"San Francisco" (Video Edit)	3:46
2.	"San Francisco" (Extended Mix)	5:25
3.	"San Francisco" (Cahill Remix)	6:32
4.	"San Francisco" (Wideboys Remix)	6:41
5.	"San Francisco" (Frisco Remix)	4:45
6.	"San Francisco" (Frisco Radio Edit)	2:58
7.	"San Francisco" (Cahill Radio Edit)	3:22
8.	"San Francisco" (Wideboys Radio Edit)	3:47
9.	"San Francisco" (Wideboys Dub Remix)	6:39

== Charts ==
=== Weekly charts ===
Chart (2011)	Peak position
Austria (Ö3 Austria Top 40)	14
Germany (GfK)	13
Netherlands (Dutch Top 40)	11
Netherlands (Single Top 100)	34
Polish Dance Chart (ZPAV)	42
Scotland Singles (Official Charts)	54
Slovakia Airplay (ČNS IFPI)	40
UK Dance (Official Charts)	15
UK Singles (Official Charts)	64
US Global Dance Tracks (Billboard)	21

=== Year-end charts ===
Chart (2011)	Position
Netherlands (Dutch Top 40)	51

== Release history ==
Region	Date	Format	Label
Germany	3 June 2011	CD single, digital download	Universal Music Group
Canada	3 June 2011	Digital download	Universal Music Group
Worldwide	20 June 2011	Digital download	Zooland
United Kingdom	4 July 2011	Digital download	All Around the World
United States	4 November 2011	Digital download	Zooland
