= What Do You Want from Me? (Cascada song) =

Single by Cascada

from the album Perfect Day
- Released: 7 March 2008 (Germany); 24 March 2008 (UK)
- Recorded: 2007
- Genre: Eurodance
- Length: 2:48
- Label: Zooland
- Songwriters: Tony Cornelissen; Manuel Reuter; Yann Peifer
- Producers: Yanou; DJ Manian

Cascada singles chronology
"What Hurts the Most" (2007)	"What Do You Want from Me?" (2008)	"Because the Night" (2008)

Audio video
- "What Do You Want from Me?" on YouTube

"What Do You Want from Me?" is a 2007 song recorded by Cascada. It was released in Germany on 7 March 2008 and was released on 24 March 2008 for the UK.

== Background and writing ==
"What Do You Want From Me?" was leaked online in advance of the Perfect Day album release, and was speculated to be title "Tell Me Why". In late 2007, All Around the World announced "What Do You Want From Me?" would be the U.K. follow-up to "What Hurts the Most".

This track and "Everytime We Touch" share a similar chord structure.

== Music video ==
Cascada's UK music label, All Around the World, released the music video on 19 January 2008, on their official site. In the video, Natalie and 3 friends are seen at a beach-side house, on the beach, and at a late night party, singing and dancing. In all scenes, she is continuously being followed or somehow connected by a young man, hence the song title "What Do You Want From Me?".

== Track listing ==
- German release
1. "What Do You Want From Me?" (Radio Edit)
2. "What Do You Want From Me?" (Extended Mix)
3. "What Do You Want From Me?" (S & H Project Radio Edit)
4. "What Do You Want From Me?" (DJ Gollum Radio Edit)
- UK release
1. "What Do You Want From Me?" (Radio Edit)
2. "What Do You Want From Me?" (K-Klass Classic Radio Edit)
3. "What Do You Want From Me?" (Original/Extended Mix)
4. "What Do You Want From Me?" (Hypasonic Mix)
5. "What Do You Want From Me?" (K-Klass Mix)
6. "What Do You Want From Me?" (Manox Remix)
7. "What Do You Want From Me?" (Fugitive's Freedom Mix)

== Official remixes ==
- "What Do You Want From Me" (Radio Edit) 2:50
- "What Do You Want From Me" (Extended Mix) 4:46
- "What Do You Want From Me" (K-Klass Remix) 6:28
- "What Do You Want From Me" (K-Klass Radio Edit) 3:34
- "What Do You Want From Me" (Flip and Fill Remix) 6:07
- "What Do You Want From Me" (Hypasonic Remix) 6:07
- "What Do You Want From Me" (Fugitives Freedom Remix) 5:22
- "What Do You Want From Me" (Manox Remix) 6:02
- "What Do You Want From Me" (Manox Radio Edit) 3:31
- "What Do You Want From Me" (Fugitives Freedom Radio Edit) 3:57
- "What Do You Want From Me" (Ti-Mo Vs Stefan Rio Remix) 5:08
- "What Do You Want From Me" (Ti-Mo Vs Stefan Rio Radio Edit) 3:43
- "What Do You Want From Me" (DJ Cyrus Remix) 5:35
- "What Do You Want From Me" (DJ Cyrus Radio Edit) 3:33
- "What Do You Want From Me" (Club Mix) 4:59
- "What Do You Want From Me" (Alex K Remix) 4:20
- "What Do You Want From Me" (Original Mix) 4:44
- "What Do You Want From Me" (S & H Project Radio Edit) 3:34
- "What Do You Want From Me" (S & H Project Remix) 5:47
- "What Do You Want From Me" (DJ Gollum Radio Edit) 3:35
- "What Do You Want From Me" (DJ Gollum Remix) 5:24
- "What Do You Want From Me" (Basslovers United Radio Edit) 3:40
- "What Do You Want From Me" (Basslovers United Extended Mix)
- "What Do You Want From Me" (Studio Acapella With Out Effects)
- "What Do You Want From Me" (Scotty-Donk Project 2010 Remix)

== Charts ==
Chart (2008)	Peak Position
Austria (Ö3 Austria Top 40)	50
European Hot 100 Singles (Billboard)	95
Germany (GfK)	54
Netherlands (Single Top 100)	89
Scottish Singles Sales (Official Charts)	10
Slovakia Airplay (ČNS IFPI)	54
UK Singles (Official Charts)	51

== Release history ==
Country	Release date	Record label
Germany	3 July 2008	Zooland
United Kingdom	17 March 2008	AATW
