= Night Nurse (Cascada song) =

Single by Cascada

from the album Original Me
- Released: December 16, 2011
- Recorded: 2010
- Genre: Electropop; Eurodance
- Length: 3:24
- Label: Zooland
- Songwriters: Tony Cornelissen; Manuel Reuter; Yann Peifer
- Producers: DJ Manian; Yanou

Cascada singles chronology
"Au Revoir" (2011)	"Night Nurse" (2011)	"Summer of Love" (2012)

Music video
- "Night Nurse" on YouTube

"Night Nurse" is the fourth overall single performed by German dance trio Cascada, from their fourth studio album, Original Me (2011). The song was written by Tony Cornelissen, Manuel Reuter and Yann Peifer, with production helmed by DJ Manian and Yanou. "Night Nurse" was released to the internet in late summer of 2010 and featured on the compilation "Clubland 18," released on November 7, 2010. "Night Nurse" uses Auto-Tune on the uncredited vocals of German singer and rapper Tony T. who was brought by DJ Manian and Yanou of their Dance Project R.I.O. Lyrically, the song is about being feverish on the dancefloor. The music video was released on the All Around the World YouTube account and on Clubland TV in November 2010 which features Horler and some male backup dancers in a warehouse party. Horler appears in some scenes painted with numerous colors and a huge spider web.

== Background and composition ==
A rough, incomplete version of the song leaked online in August 2010. A supposed "radio edit" later appeared, but turned out to be fanmade. Several unofficial remixes have surfaced online due to the remix pack of the track leaking, which contained instrumentals, acapellas and samples of the song. The final edit of the song was soon released sometime in October and released for download and purchase as part of a compilation of dance music. The single cover for the song was released in October 2010. It features lead singer Natalie Horler in an edited scene from the song's music video, with her silhouette as the central figure. The background of the cover is a multicolored wheel, with colors of green, yellow and orange.

The song lasts for three minutes and twenty-two seconds. The song has an ominous undertone and was lyrically about partying with a fever. “Night Nurse” features references of medicine including lyrics like “I can be your remedy, your cure”. The use of Auto-Tune is notable in Tony T's vocals and the use of electronic keyboards reminiscent of the 1980s is present throughout the song.

'Night Nurse' became Cascada's 3rd single not to chart in the UK top 100 charts, following 'Au Revoir' and 'Fever', however, this is mainly due to it not being released as an actual single. 'Au Revoir', 'Night Nurse', and 'Fever' were all released after their preceding albums were released.

== Music video ==
The music video premiered on All Around the World's YouTube account and on Clubland TV on November 6, 2010 The video starts with images of Horler wearing body paint before showing her rising from a small platform in the middle of a room with sunlight shining in, alternating back-and-forth with images of Horler's silhouette in front a multicolored wheel. Tony T is then shown singing the words "Night Nurse," and Horler is seen with backup dancers. An immense spiderweb is shown hanging down from the ceiling, and the video switches to a room filling up with dancers who begin dancing. Horler is seen standing in a circular window in the middle of the back wall. As the bridge starts, the song stops, and Tony T is shown walking towards the spiderweb. As he reaches the web and places his hand on it, the web opens, and the song resumes, with Horler next shown standing against a wall covered in spiderwebs. The room of dancers performs advanced dance routines, and the song ends with Horler in front of the wheel. Eventually, AATW released the music video for "Night Nurse" on the U.K and Ireland iTunes. Later, the video was put as an album only song in Germany on a "Future Trance" album.

== Track listing ==
All tracks are written by Tony Cornelissen, Manuel Reuter & Yann Peifer.

No.	Title	Length
1.	"Night Nurse" (Video Edit)	03:23
2.	"Night Nurse" (Ryan Thistlebeck vs. Dan Winter Radio Edit)	03:56
3.	"Night Nurse" (Ryan Thistlebeck vs. Dan Winter Remix)	05:57
4.	"Night Nurse" (DJs From Mars Radio Edit)	03:30
5.	"Night Nurse" (DJs From Mars Remix)	06:13
6.	"Night Nurse" (Christian Davies Remix)	05:34
7.	"Night Nurse" (Lockout’s First Aid Remix)	05:24
8.	"Night Nurse" (Technikore Remix)	05:39
Total length:		39:35

== Charts ==
Chart (2011)	Peak position
Czech Republic (Rádio – Top 100)	67
US Hot Dance Club Songs	20

== Release history ==
Region	Date	Format	Label
United States	December 16, 2011	Digital download	Zooland
