= Allan Eshuijs =

- Origin: Zaanstad, North Holland, Netherlands
- Genres: Pop, Dance music, Electronic music, Dance-pop
- Occupations: Songwriter, record producer, back-up vocalist
- Instruments: Vocals, Keyboards
- Years active: 2000–present
- Label: Vocalkitchen
- Website: http://www.vocalkitchen.com/

Allan Eshuijs (born 31 May 1976, Zaanstad) is a Dutch songwriter, record producer and back-up vocalist. He started his songwriting career writing mainly for Dutch and German artists, including Cascada, Yvonne Catterfeld, Ch!pz and Sandy Mölling, but he now also works with US and international artists such as Madcon, Estelle, Taio Cruz, Lost Frequencies, Fedde Le Grand, Dannii Minogue and Macy Gray. His most successful hits to date are "Crazy" by Lost Frequencies & Zonderling, "Evacuate the Dancefloor" by Cascada, which reached #1 in the UK and the Netherlands, and Ch!pz' "1001 Arabian Nights".

== Career ==
=== Vocalist and music production ===
Eshuijs began his career as a vocalist after obtaining a bachelor's degree in Vocal Performance at the Conservatorium van Amsterdam in 2000. He founded the music production company GEMINI Music and started working as a backing vocalist and keyboardist for a number of successful national and international artists, including Oleta Adams, Jocelyn Brown, Trijntje Oosterhuis, Candy Dulfer and Ruth Jacott.

== Discography ==
Song	Artist	Released	Chart Position
Don't Look Away	Chemical Surf feat. Allan Eshuijs	2018	
Crazy	Lost Frequencies feat. Zonderling	2017	Nr. 1 German Airplay Chart, Nr 1 Belgian Airplay Chart
Spread The Fire	Lost Stories (DJs) feat. Marc Wulf	2017	
Go 2.0	Burak Yeter feat. Ryan Riback	2017	
Happy	Burak Yeter	2016	
Send Her My Love	Lost Frequencies	2016	
Down On Me	Fedde Le Grand	2016	
Dreamin'	Ralvero & Kill The Buzz	2015	
Once You Go Up	Nungwi	2015	
Feel Good	Ladies of Soul	2015	
Hollywood	Kinderen voor Kinderen	2015	
Dit Is Pas Het Begin	Katrina (Junior Songfestival 2015)	2015	
The Harder They Fall	Joey Dale	2015	
Make It Count	Fame Academy (NL)	2015	
Not Our Day To Die	Do	2015	
Anything Goes	Disfunktion	2015	
Oxygen	Bass Modulators	2015	
Una Noche	Alessandro	2015	
Flaschengeist	Tanja Kreutmayer & Kilian Scheyer	2014	
Madness	Cascada feat. Tris	2014	
Wings	Tom Swoon feat. Taylor Renee	2013	
Never Comes Back	Reepublic	2013	
Where Nobody's Gone Before	Madcon feat. Estelle	2013	
Shameless	Luca Hänni	2013	
Jump Start The Party	Luca Hänni	2013	
Don't Stay It's Too Late	Luca Hänni	2013	
In Libben Yn'e Rock & Roll	Johannes Rypma	2013	
Till The Morning	Alina (Dance)	2013	
Let Out Da Freak	Spencer & Hill feat. Mimoza	2012	
A Stalker	Rochelle Perts	2012	
Touching A Stranger	Wildboyz	2011	
My Miss America	Jedward	2011	
Kom Terug Bij Mij	Jaap Reesema	2011	
I Hate Goodbyes	Jaap Reesema	2011	
Stalker	Cascada	2011	
Au Revoir	Cascada	2011	
Secret Girl	Ralf Mackenbach	2010	
Doe De Smoove!	Ralf Mackenbach	2010	Nr. 55 Dutch Single Top 100
Ik Leef Mijn Droom	Gerard Joling	2010	Nr. 1 Dutch Single Top 100
Alweer Een Goal	Gerard Joling	2010	Nr. 6 Dutch Single Top 100
Under Arrest	Danzel	2010	
Pyromania	Cascada	2010	
Click Clack	Ralf Mackenbach	2009	Nr. 7 Dutch Single Top 100
Je Bent Bij Me	Raf van Brussel	2009	
Zolang Je Winnen Kan	Quincy	2009	Nr. 21 Dutch Single Top 100
She Knows	Jozephine	2009	
Meer Dan Een Fantasie	Jim	2009	
What About Me	Cascada	2009	
Ready Or Not	Cascada	2009	
Evacuate The Dancefloor	Cascada	2009	Nr. 7 Dutch Single Top 100
Sterker Dan Ooit	Antje Monteiro	2009	Nr. 18 Dutch Single Top 100
Memory Of Us	Udo	2008	
Afterparty	Cru5h 5	2007	
Perfect Day	Cascada	2007	
Kenn Ich Dich	Yvonne Catterfeld	2006	
Can't Stop The Rain	Cascada	2006	
Love Is Killing Me	Do	2004	Nr. 11 Dutch Single Top 100
1001 Arabian Nights	Ch!pz	2004	Nr. 1 Dutch Single Top 100
