= Everytime We Touch (Cascada song) =

2005 single by Cascada

Single by Cascada

from the album Everytime We Touch
- Released: 16 August 2005
- Genre: Eurodance; hi-NRG
- Length: 3:19
- Label: Robbins
- Songwriters: Stuart Mackilliop; Maggie Reilly; Peter Risavy
- Producers: Manuel "Manian" Reuter; Yann "Yanou" Peifer

Cascada singles chronology
"Miracle" (2004)	"Everytime We Touch" (2005)	"How Do You Do!" (2005)

Music video
- "Everytime We Touch" on YouTube

"Everytime We Touch" is a song by German dance music trio Cascada, taken from their 2006 debut album, Everytime We Touch. It was arranged and produced by the band's DJs, Manian and Yanou. The writing and composing credits were given to Maggie Reilly, Stuart Mackilliop, and Peter Risavy, as the song borrows the chorus from Reilly's song "Everytime We Touch".

Cascada's "Everytime We Touch" was first released in the United States on 16 August 2005 by Robbins Entertainment. It was later released internationally in association with other dance music labels including Zooland Records and All Around the World and Universal Music Group following its success in the US. Musically, the song was composed as a Eurodance track with a pulsating synthesizer, jackhammer beat, and Europop lyrics.

The song was met with generally positive reviews from critics, with the majority of them praising its dance-pop sound and its potential appeal to the American market. "Everytime We Touch" has enjoyed chart success in many countries, lasting more than twenty-three weeks in different territories. The song peaked in the number one position in Ireland and Sweden while attaining top five chart positions in Austria, France, Germany and the United Kingdom. It achieved commercial success in the US, reaching number ten on the Billboard Hot 100. The track was certified platinum in the US for sales exceeding one million copies. The accompanying music video depicts lead singer Natalie Horler in a library, trying to communicate with her love interest. As of 12 June 2026, the song's original MV, uploaded to YouTube by the Cascada in 2011, has accumulated 44,606,783 views. Whereas, the original soundtrack video, also re-uploaded to YouTube in 2018, has accumulated another 50,192,764 views.

== Background and release ==
This version of "Everytime We Touch" was written and composed by Manuel Reutier and Yann Pfeifer, who borrowed the refrain that Stuart MacKilliop, Maggie Reilly, and Peter Risavy had written and composed; Reutier and Pfeifer also jointly produced the selection under their DJ names of DJ Manian and Yanou respectively, being as they were the two DJs who made up the band Cascada. The song was recorded and produced at Studio Plazmatek Cologne in Cologne, Germany and at Studio Plazmatek Erkrath in Erkrath, Germany.

The song was released in the US on 16 August 2005 as a maxi single. It was released in the single format in the Czech Republic on 14 July 2006. The song was later released to the French iTunes Store on 31 March 2006 as a maxi single and on 23 October 2006 as a digital single. The maxi single release features remixes by 2-4 Grooves and Rocco vs. Bass-T along with the ballad mix by Yanou. In Austria, "Everytime We Touch" was released on 4 September 2006 in the same format with all nine tracks featured on the U.S. maxi single but in a different order. On 22 December 2006, the song was released to Germany in the maxi-single format.

== Music and remixes ==
Cascada – "Everytime We Touch"
An 18 second sample of the up-tempo Eurodance song.

"Everytime We Touch" is an uptempo song that runs for 3 minutes and 16 seconds. It maintains the characteristics of Eurodance, making use of kickdrums, synthesizers, and a drum machine. According to the digital sheet music published at Musicnotes.com by Sony/ATV Music Publishing, the song is written in the key of F minor. It runs through a tempo of 142 beats per minute. Horler's vocal range in the song spans one octave, from the lower note of A♭_{3} to the higher note of B♭_{4}. Many of the contemporary critics, upon reviewing the song and parent album, noted that "Everytime We Touch" features characteristics of techno and dance-pop. The vocals for the song are provided by lead singer Natalie Horler. Horler sings the first verse with minimal pads in the background. As the chorus (" 'Cause everytime we touch, I get this feeling/ And everytime we kiss, I swear I could fly") commences, a "jackhammer" beat and a "pulsing" synthesizer play in the background. Following the chorus is a techno-styled breakdown, in which a staccato keyboard line plays along with the drum machine.

The remixes on the maxi single have a consistent Euro-rave sound. The Rocco vs. Bass-T remix features "a breaks-y instrumental bridge toward the middle with a quirky sample medley for a few bars" with segments of chopped vocals. Dan Winter's mix includes a "thicker Euro-rave synthline, longer instrumental expanses," and influences of 80's electro. The Scarf! remix begins with a breakbeat intro and features equalizer/distorted verse vocals. The Verano remix is composed of "a busier synth melody in the transitions, a pretty bells-driven music bed for the verses, and is punctuated throughout with some creative transitional drum rolls."

== Critical reception ==
Kurt Kirton of About.com rated the song three and a half stars (out of five), praising the songs "strong, hooky melody," and the consistency of the remixes on the maxi single released in the United States. He further commented that "The Original Mix is a good solid dance-pop track.". Sharon Mawer of All Music Guide named "Everytime We Touch" as one of the best tracks on the album in her review of the song's parent album, Everytime We Touch. Ken Barnes of USA Today praised the song as an "insanely infectious concoction" in his review of the parent album. Marc Vera of Entertainment Weekly favored the song, writing "True, the song is pretty generic, of the thump-thump beat-beat variety, but it’s still catchy as hell." Kelefa Sanneh of The New York Times commented that the song is "more shameless than earnest" and praised it as "an energetic dance-pop confection". Chuck Taylor of Billboard lauded the song for its "fine vocal, mesmerizing melody, and high-energy production", claiming that the formula "sets it apart from the tried and true on top 40."

== Chart performance ==
"Everytime We Touch" first charted in the United States. Nearly five months after its U.S. release, the song debuted on the Billboard Hot 100 at number 86 for the week dated 17 December 2005. The following week, it jumped 24 places to number 62. After falling to number 56 following a continuous rise, the song rose to number 49. It continued climbing up the chart for six weeks until for the week of 13 March 2006, when it peaked at number 10. "Everytime We Touch" fluctuated within the top twenty for nine weeks following its peak on the chart. The song exited the Billboard Hot 100 for the week of 22 July 2006 after 31 weeks on the chart. The song was certified gold on 3 May 2006 for sales exceeding 500,000 copies and on 2 November 2006 was certified platinum, having sold more than one million copies. To date, the song has sold over 2.5 million downloads and 7,000 maxi singles. In Sweden, the song debuted on the Singles Top 60 chart at number 57 for the week of 11 May 2006. For the week of 7 September 2006, song reached the summit after spending nearly ten weeks within the top five. The single spent a total of 41 weeks on the chart. "Everytime We Touch" was certified double platinum in Sweden after selling 40,000 digital downloads.

The song had great chart success in the Great Britain territory. In the United Kingdom, "Everytime We Touch" debuted on the UK Singles Chart at number 41 for the week of 30 July 2006. The next week, the song jumped 37 places from number 41 to number four. It reached its peak at number two and continued charting for more than thirty weeks. In Ireland, the song debuted on the Singles Top 50 chart at number seven, listed as that week's highest debut. The song ascended to number one in its third week, knocking out "Hips Don't Lie" by Colombian singer Shakira after nine weeks at number-one on the chart. The song stayed there for one more week before being overtaken by Justin Timberlake's "SexyBack". After four weeks holding at number two, the song claimed the top position from Timberlake and remained at that position for three weeks more.

In the Netherlands, the song debuted at number 40 for the week of 16 September 2006. After weeks of fluctuating in the top thirty, the song reached number 13 in its sixth week. The following week, the song climbed to its peak position of number 10. In France, "Everytime We Touch" debuted and peaked at number two, being listed as the highest debut on the chart for the week of 28 October 2006. It stayed at its peak position for three weeks and within the top ten for 16 of the song's 37 week chart run. In Switzerland, the song peaked at number 22 and fluctuated in the top fifty for 17 out of its 24-week chart run. In Austria, "Everytime We Touch" lasted a total of 21 weeks on the Singles Top 75 chart, peaking at number 15. "Everytime We Touch" was commercially successful domestically. For the week of 26 January 2007, the song debuted on the Singles Top 100 chart at number eight. Two weeks later the song peaked at number five. It lasted a total of 19 weeks on the chart, exiting one last time at number 96 for the week of 25 January 2008.

== Formats and track listings ==
- US maxi single
1. "Everytime We Touch" – 3:19
2. "Everytime We Touch" (Rocco vs. Bass-T remix radio edit) – 3:06
3. "Everytime We Touch" (Dan Winter radio edit) – 3:38
4. "Everytime We Touch" (Verano radio edit) – 3:23
5. "Everytime We Touch" (original mix) – 5:34
6. "Everytime We Touch" (Rocco vs. Bass-T remix) – 5:42
7. "Everytime We Touch" (Dan Winter remix) – 6:37
8. "Everytime We Touch" (Scarf! remix) – 5:34
9. "Everytime We Touch" (Verano remix) – 5:50
- Austria maxi single
1. "Everytime We Touch" (Dan Winter remix) – 3:19
2. "Everytime We Touch" (Verano remix) – 3:06
3. "Everytime We Touch" (Rocco vs. Bass T remix) – 3:25
4. "Everytime We Touch" (original club mix) – 3:37
5. "Everytime We Touch" (Scarf! remix) – 5:34
6. "Everytime We Touch" (Dan Winter edit) – 5:33
7. "Everytime We Touch" (Verano edit) – 5:42
8. "Everytime We Touch" (Rocco vs. Bass T radio cut) – 5:52
9. "Everytime We Touch" (radio edit) – 6:35
- German maxi single
1. "Everytime We Touch" (radio edit) – 3:17
2. "Everytime We Touch" (2-4 Grooves radio mix) – 3:00
3. "Everytime We Touch" (Rocco vs. Bass-T radio edit) – 3:04
4. "Everytime We Touch" (original club mix) – 5:31
5. "Everytime We Touch" (ballad version) – 3:19
6. "Everytime We Touch" (89ers radio edit) – 3:29
- French maxi single
1. "Everytime We Touch" (radio edit) – 3:17
2. "Everytime We Touch" (Yanou's Candlelight mix) – 3:15
3. "Everytime We Touch" (Rocco vs. Bass-T radio edit) – 3:04
4. "Everytime We Touch" (club mix) – 5:31
5. "Everytime We Touch" (2-4 Grooves Remix) – 6:15
- Canadian digital single
1. "Everytime We Touch" – 3:16
- Czech digital single
1. "Everytime We Touch" – 3:17
2. "Everytime We Touch" (Rocco vs. Bass-T radio cut) – 3:04
- UK maxi single
1. "Everytime We Touch" (radio edit) – 3:18
2. "Everytime We Touch" (Styles and Breeze mix) – 5:35
3. "Everytime We Touch" (Rocco vs. Bass-T remix) – 5:42
4. "Everytime We Touch" (Dan Winter remix) – 6:38
5. "Everytime We Touch" (Flip & Fill remix) – 5:45
6. "Everytime We Touch" (KB Project remix) – 5:31
7. "Everytime We Touch" (Dancing DJ's remix) – 5:29
8. "Everytime We Touch" (Kenny Hayes remix) – 6:05
9. "Everytime We Touch" (Yanou's Candlelight mix) – 3:19
10. "Everytime We Touch" (original club mix) – 5:30
11. "Everytime We Touch" (Scarf! remix) – 5:35

== Charts ==
=== Weekly charts ===
Chart (2005–2007)	Peak position
Australia (ARIA)	61
Austria (Ö3 Austria Top 40)	13
Belgium (Ultratop 50 Flanders)	32
Belgium (Ultratop 50 Wallonia)	7
Canada Digital Song Sales (Billboard)	2
Canada CHR/Pop Top 40 (Radio & Records)	5
CIS Airplay (TopHit)	19
Czech Republic Airplay (ČNS IFPI)	46
Europe (Eurochart Hot 100)	5
Finland Download (Latauslista)	16
France (SNEP)	2
Germany (GfK)	5
Ireland (IRMA)	1
Netherlands (Dutch Top 40)	10
Netherlands (Single Top 100)	12
Russia Airplay (TopHit)	19
Scottish Singles Sales (Official Charts)	2
Sweden (Sverigetopplistan)	1
Switzerland (Schweizer Hitparade)	22
UK Singles (Official Charts)	2
Ukraine Airplay (TopHit)	82
US Billboard Hot 100	10
US Adult Contemporary (Billboard)	28
US Dance Singles Sales (Billboard)	2
US Dance Airplay (Billboard)	1
US Pop Airplay (Billboard)	7

=== Year-end charts ===
Chart (2006)	Position
CIS Airplay (TopHit)	69
Europe (Eurochart Hot 100)	13
France (SNEP)	12
Ireland (IRMA)	4
Netherlands (Dutch Top 40)	44
Netherlands (Single Top 100)	50
Russia Airplay (TopHit)	64
Sweden (Hitlistan)	5
UK Singles (OCC)	15
US Billboard Hot 100	31
US Hot Dance Airplay (Billboard)	5

Chart (2007)	Position
Belgium (Ultratop 50 Wallonia)	37
Europe (Eurochart Hot 100)	24
France (SNEP)	23
Germany (Media Control GfK)	52
Switzerland (Schweizer Hitparade)	86

== Certifications ==
Region	Certification	Certified units/sales
Canada (Music Canada)	Platinum	40,000^{*}
Denmark (IFPI Danmark)	2× Platinum	180,000^{‡}
Finland (Musiikkituottajat)	Gold	5,814
France (SNEP)	Platinum	320,000
Germany (BVMI)	2× Platinum	600,000^{‡}
Italy (FIMI)	Gold	25,000^{‡}
New Zealand (RMNZ)	2× Platinum	60,000^{‡}
Spain (Promusicae)	Gold	30,000^{‡}
Sweden (GLF)	2× Platinum	40,000^{^}
United Kingdom (BPI)	3× Platinum	1,800,000^{‡}
United States (RIAA)	Platinum	1,000,000
^{*} Sales figures based on certification alone.^{^} Shipments figures based on certification alone.^{‡} Sales+streaming figures based on certification alone.

== Release history ==
Country	Date	Format	Label	Ref.
United States	16 August 2005	Maxi single	Robbins	
United States	13 December 2005	Contemporary hit radio	Robbins	
Canada	21 March 2006	Digital download	Robbins	
United Kingdom	24 July 2006	Digital download	Zooland	
Australia	16 October 2006	CD	Central Station	
Germany	22 December 2006	Maxi single	Universal	
Australia	23 January 2010	Remixes – extended play	Central Station	

== In popular culture ==
"Everytime We Touch" has been a fixture at Duke basketball games since 2005, with both the original version and a cover version by the Duke pep band commonly heard at home games. The tradition has also spilled over to Duke football, where the song is often played over the speakers at Wallace Wade Stadium following big plays. The song has evolved into an unofficial anthem for the university as a whole, with Horler making a virtual appearance for the class of 2020's commencement.

"Everytime We Touch" was also the lipsync song on Season 2 of Drag Race UK Vs The World between Dutch Queen Keta Minaj and French Queen La Grand Dame for the challenge win of episode 2 with the latter winning the performance.

The wrestler Session Moth Martina uses the song for her entrance.

Kill Tony used an instrumental version of the song for the weekly entrance of comedian Casey Rocket.
