= Cascada =

German electronic dance music group

Background information
- Origin: Bonn, Germany
- Genres: Eurodance; hands up
- Years active: 2004–present
- Labels: Warner; Zooland; All Around the World; Robbins; Spinnin'; Kontor
- Members: Natalie Horler
- Past members: Manuel Reuter; Yann Peifer
- Website: cascada-music.de

Cascada (/kəˈskɑːdə/, Spanish, 'Waterfall') is a German Eurodance music act founded in 2004 by singer Natalie Horler and composers/record producers DJ Manian and DJ Yanou. They were a trio until 2021, with their last track together being "One Last Dance". Since then, Natalie has fronted the group as a solo project, and released Cascada's fifth studio album, Studio 24, produced by Christian Geller, in 2024.

Cascada is best known for the hit singles "Everytime We Touch", "What Hurts the Most", "Evacuate the Dancefloor" and "Miracle".

Cascada represented Germany at the Eurovision Song Contest 2013 in Malmö, Sweden with "Glorious". While being one of the most successful bands of the Electronic dance music genre itself, Cascada was named as the third-most successful German act of the 21st century.

In 2010 and again in 2014, Cascada's music was the second-most downloaded of all time in the dance category, after David Guetta.

== Music career ==
=== 2004–2005: Early career ===
When Natalie Horler was 17 in 1998, she was doing studio work for various DJs. She met Yanou and DJ Manian when they were 24 and 20, respectively. Originally, they released music under the name Cascade, but due to Kaskade, another artist with a similar name, threatening legal action, they changed it to Cascada. At the same time, they also released music under the names of Siria, 3XM, Phalanx, Scarf!, Diamond, and Akira, before ending these projects due to the success of Cascada. Under Andorfine Records, they produced their debut and hit single, "Miracle", and its follow-up, "Bad Boy", in Germany. This caught the attention of the American dance label Robbins Entertainment. They negotiated a contract, and "Miracle" was released in 2004. When this did not attract much attention, Cascada offered them "Everytime We Touch".

=== 2005–2007: Everytime We Touch ===
Cascada experienced mainstream success in the United Kingdom and the United States almost a year after releasing their second American single, "Everytime We Touch", which interpolates the chorus of a 1992 Maggie Reilly song of the same name. The song gained platinum and gold certifications across the globe, being certified platinum by the RIAA. As the popularity of the single skyrocketed, a music video was produced, and an album was recorded and released a few months later.

A total of seven singles were released from the album, four of which have been released in the United Kingdom: "Everytime We Touch", "Truly Madly Deeply" (originally by Savage Garden), "Miracle" and "A Neverending Dream" (originally by X-Perience), all of which gained Top 10 status apart from "A Neverending Dream" (which charted at No.46). The US saw the re-release of "Miracle" shortly after "Everytime We Touch"'s breakthrough, receiving high radio rotation and reaching the lower ends of the Billboard chart. Their album Everytime We Touch experienced success in the UK Album chart, where it remained in the Top 40 for 24 weeks, peaking at No.2. The album experienced success on the US charts as well. The success of the album gained Cascada two World Music Award nominations, and won them the World's Best-Selling German Artist. On 12 February 2010, a Premium Edition of the album was released featuring remixes from Pulsedriver and Tune Up!, and an exclusive vocal edit from ItaloBrothers.

=== 2007–2009: Perfect Day ===
At the end of 2007, Cascada released their second album, Perfect Day in the UK and several Northern European countries, followed by the remaining markets in the first quarter of 2008, The album contained cover versions of Avril Lavigne's "Sk8er Boi", Pink's "Just Like A Pill", Patti Smith's "Because the Night" and the Jeffrey Steele song "What Hurts the Most", as well as two tracks, "Endless Summer" and "I Will Believe It", that were previously recorded by Horler and DJ Manian under the discontinued Siria name. However, the US version, which was released last, replaced the Siria songs and the Pink and Avril Lavigne cover versions with three other tracks, because they could not obtain the North American rights. The lead single, "What Hurts the Most", was released in late 2007 and early 2008, along with its B-side, a cover version of Wham!'s "Last Christmas". The single had high success, reaching the Top 10 in many countries. In the UK and Germany, "What Do You Want From Me?" and "Because the Night" were released as a follow-up single. In the United States, "Faded" and "Perfect Day" were released as singles but received little airplay outside of the dance-radio circuit.

=== 2009–2010: Evacuate the Dancefloor ===
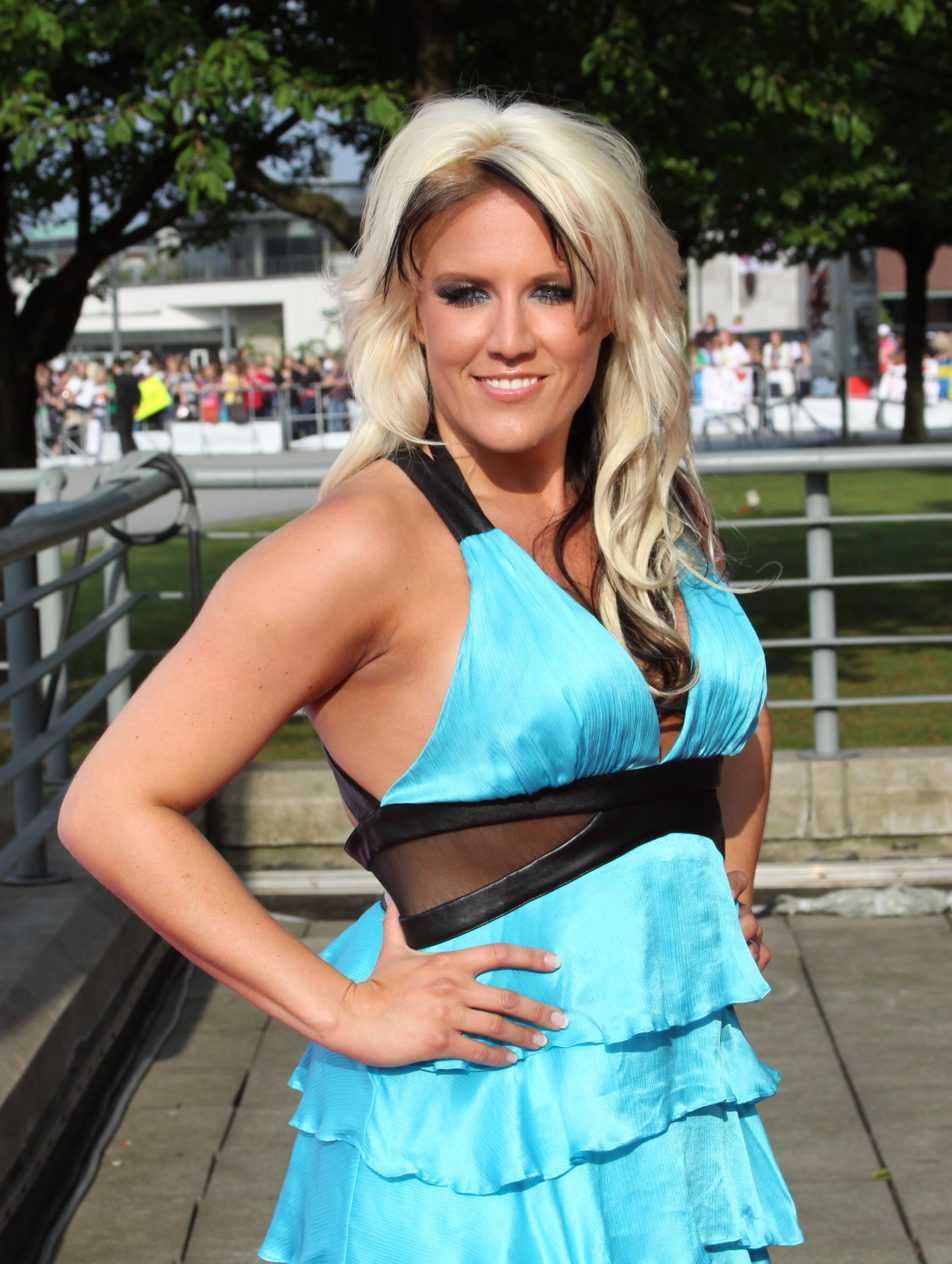
Natalie Horler in 2010, Berlin

On 29 June 2009, "Evacuate the Dancefloor" was released in the UK. The release, just four days after the death of Michael Jackson, was expected to chart below Jackson's old hits, which sold heavily after his death. Instead, it debuted at No. 1, above Jackson's "Man in the Mirror". The song went on to the top five in Australia, Canada, France, Germany, Ireland, and New Zealand, as well as the top 10 in many more. The song was released in the US in late September and peaked at 25, remaining on the chart for 17 weeks and making it the group's second Top 40 hit.

The song has become a club staple, used in many dance-oriented video games, and even nominated for an MTV Video Music Award. The album, also named Evacuate the Dancefloor, was released a week later on 6 July in the UK and Germany. The album continued Cascada's progression into electro-pop, a change welcomed by mainstream audiences and fans, despite many fans missing the euro-pop feel they considered integral to the Cascada project. The album itself did not mirror the success of the single, yet it did chart in the Top 10 of many countries, including the UK where it went on to sell 100,000 copies. "Dangerous" and "Fever" were follow-up singles released from the album, the former in the UK, and the latter in the US, Australia and the rest of Europe, neither experiencing success in terms of radio play, digital or physical sales. Nevertheless, the group toured extensively to promote the album, even opening for Britney Spears during a stop in Germany.

=== 2010–2011: Original Me ===
A new single "Pyromania" was released in 2010, continuing Cascada's new electropop sound. During the Summer of 2010, elements of a song titled "Night Nurse" began to leak online. A music video featuring Horler in full body paint of various colours in many scenes was released in November 2010 to promote the upcoming album.

On the weekend of 26 March 2011, Cascada shot two music videos for the upcoming singles "San Francisco" and "Au Revoir". Both videos were directed by Lisa Mann and choreographed by Luther Brown, and both singles were featured on the album Original Me which was released on 20 June 2011 in the UK and 29 November 2011 in the US.

After the release of the album, Horler posed for Playboy Deutschland in July 2011, to mixed reactions from fans and critics. On 1 September 2011, US label Robbins Entertainment announced on their message board that Cascada and Robbins had amicably parted ways, and Cascada were released from the label, citing creative differences as the reason for their departure. It was also announced that Original Me would still be released, under their Zooland label.

=== 2012–2013: The Best of Cascada, Eurovision Song Contest 2013 and Acoustic Sessions ===
On 7 January 2012, Horler joined the jury of German singing contest Deutschland sucht den Superstar. On 16 March 2012, the music video for "Summer of Love" premiered in Germany, followed by the compilation album Back on the Dancefloor.

In early June 2012, a video clip of Horler performing a cover of Corona's "The Rhythm of the Night" surfaced online. "The Rhythm of the Night" was released on 22 June 2012 in Germany and in the US.

On 30 November 2012, Cascada released a Christmas Album, It's Christmas Time, which included a cover version of Wham!'s "Last Christmas" and a brand new track, "Somewhere At Christmas Time". Natalie Horler's father, David Horler, played the trombone on two of the tracks.

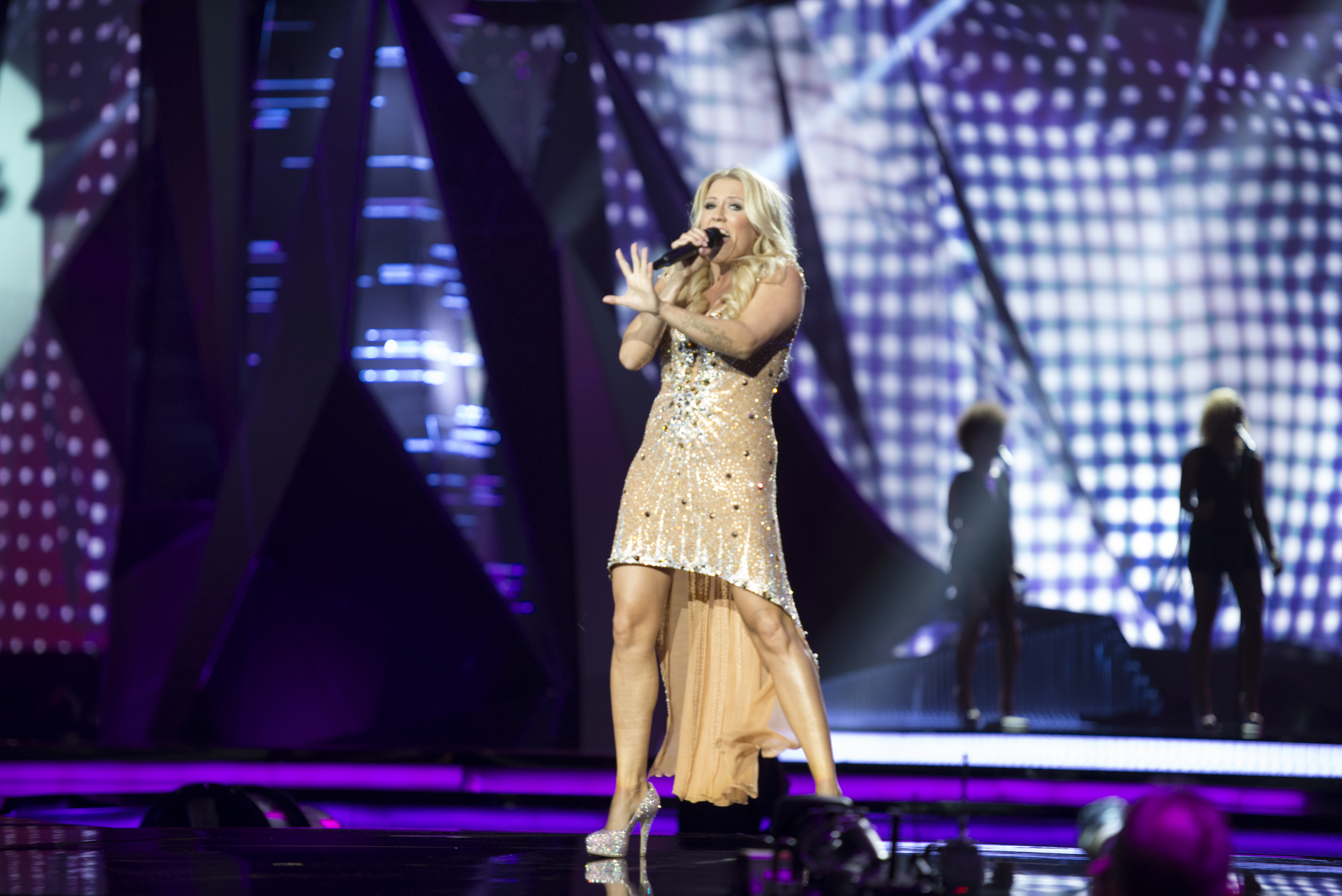
Cascada represented Germany in the Eurovision Song Contest 2013.

On 8 February 2013, Cascada released the single "Glorious". A week later, they won the German qualification for the Eurovision Song Contest 2013 with this song. On 18 May 2013, Cascada earned 18 points in the Eurovision Final, putting them in 21st place in a field of 26 contestants.

Around this time, Cascada released their second greatest hits album, The Best of Cascada, including the brand new track "The World is in My Hands", which went on to become their follow up single after Eurovision. They also returned to the studio to work on an acoustic album, which was released as Acoustic Sessions on 1 November 2013. The album comprises acoustic versions of the band's hits as well as a few cover versions of other songs, most notably "You" performed by both Horler and Robin Stjernberg.

=== 2014–2024: Focus on touring and new singles ===
On 28 March 2014, Cascada's new single, titled "Blink", was released in Germany with the video premiering on the same day. The track was originally recorded by pop group U.V.U.K. In April 2014, the single was released in Australia and France, and also began receiving airplay in the UK.

According to a 2014 interview, the group had no plans to release a fifth studio album, but were working on a new single. For this single, "Madness", Cascada collaborated with Manchester-based rapper Tristan 'Tris' Henry; the single was released on 26 September 2014 worldwide, with the video premiering on YouTube on 30 September. On 20 February 2015, the band released a re-work of "Reason", a song originally released in 2004 under the previous alias 'Diamond'. The video was shot in Mallorca and premiered on 20 February 2015.

On 28 May 2015, Horler took a short break due to her pregnancy. All upcoming shows were cancelled; fans were assured that new music was "in the works" and photos showed Horler in the studio during the Summer. In September 2015, Horler gave birth to her daughter, Jamie. Cascada returned to the stage in December 2015, with upcoming shows in Norway, Austria and Germany. On New Year's Eve, they performed in London along with The X Factor contestant Fleur East.

For the better part of 2016, Horler was busy touring parts of Norway and the United Kingdom, while also working in the studio with Yanou on new material. Brazilian producer Cassiano collaborated with Cascada on a cover version of "Praise You" by Mary Mary. This was released on 10 June 2016.

After a two-year break from releasing music, Cascada returned with a new single, "Run" on 27 January 2017. Horler stated in an interview that they planned to release singles instead of a full album, and they already had a new song lined up for release. On 20 April 2017, Cascada released "Playground", the official song of the 2017 Ice Hockey World Championship held in Cologne, Germany and Paris, France. Horler performed the song for the opening ceremony on 4 May 2017.

In the summer of 2018, a new single entitled "Back For Good" was released. Hardwell and Maurice West released a remix of "Everytime We Touch" at this time too.

A year later, Cascada released their next single, "Like the Way I Do", in August 2019. Horler stated it was one of her favourite tracks they have done. In March 2020, a ballad version of the track was released.

In October 2020, Cascada released a cover of "I'm Feeling It (In the Air)". The track was previously released in 2017 by Sunset Bros & Mark McCabe. It was released in the UK by Xploded Music. The track brought Cascada back to their clubland roots.

In May 2021, Horler announced through an interview that "One Last Dance", a collaboration with Canadian 1980s synth band Trans-X, would be released on 4 June 2021. On 5 November 2021, Cascada, along with Timmy Trumpet and Harris & Ford, released their single, "Never Let Me Go" on Spinnin' Records.

Collaborations with international DJs continued, including "Never Let Me Go", in collaboration with Timmy Trumpet, released on November 5, 2021 and ranked 10th in the Top 100 international DJs in 2021 according to DJ Magazine, and Harris & Ford, and the remix of "Never Be Lonely" by Jax Jones and Zoe Wees, released on March 8, 2024, which reached the top 10 in the UK charts and performed at the Capital FM Summertime Ball.

=== 2024: 20th Anniversary & Studio 24 ===
Cascada celebrated their 20th anniversary in 2024. On 8 March, Jax Jones released a remix by Cascada of his latest single "Never be Lonely", Horler re-recording the track for the remix. Cascada announced that their highly anticipated sixth studio album, titled Studio 24, would be released on 10 October. The first single from the album, a cover of Marvin Gaye and Tammi Terrell's "Ain't No Mountain High Enough", was released on 15 March.

This album aims to bring up to date the biggest hits of disco, such as the aforementioned cover of "Ain't No Mountain High Enough", and a cover of "Call Me" by Blondie, released 21 June 2024. Music videos were released for both, both directed by Marcel Brell.

Notably, Studio 24 featured neither of the producers Yanou and Manian, with singer Natalie Horler citing her wish to temporarily devote herself to independent musical projects. However, after the release of Studio 24, Horler confirmed on Instagram that Manian and Yanou had departed from Cascada, saying that Cascada is now a solo project, though she was open to working with Manian again in the future.

== Discography ==
Studio albums

- Everytime We Touch (2006)
- Perfect Day (2007)
- Evacuate the Dancefloor (2009)
- Original Me (2011)
- It's Christmas Time (2012)
- Studio 24 (2024)

== Awards and nominations ==
Year	Awards	Category	Nominated work	Result
2006	International Dance Music Awards	Best New Dance Artist Solo		Won
2006	International Dance Music Awards	Best High Energy/Euro Track	Everytime We Touch	Nominated
2006	Napster Awards	Most-Played Dance/Electronic Recording	Everytime We Touch	Won
2007	World Music Awards	World's Best Selling Female Pop Artist		Nominated
2007	World Music Awards	Best-Selling German Artist Award		Won
2008	European Border Breakers Award (EBBA)	Best European Border Breaker- Germany	Everytime We Touch	Won
2008	International Dance Music Awards	Best High Energy/ Euro Track	Truly, Madly, Deeply	Nominated
2008	International Dance Music Awards	Best Dance Artist (Solo)		Nominated
2009	International Dance Music Awards	Best Dance Artist (Solo)		Won
2010	International Dance Music Awards	Best High Energy/Euro Track	Evacuate the Dancefloor	Nominated
2010	International Dance Music Awards	Best Pop Dance Track	Evacuate the Dancefloor	Nominated
2010	International Dance Music Awards	Best Artist (Group)		Won
2010	Comet	Best Female Artist	Evacuate the Dancefloor	Won
2010	Urban Music Awards	Best Dance Act		Won
2010	MTV Video Music Awards	Best Dance Music Video	Evacuate the Dancefloor	Nominated
2011	International Dance Music Awards	Best Commercial Dance Track	Pyromania	Nominated
2026	Electronic Dance Music Awards	Reimagined Song of the Year	Everytime We Touch (with Steve Aoki)	Won

Preceded by Roman Lob with "Standing Still"	Germany in the Eurovision Song Contest; 2013	Succeeded by Elaiza with "Is It Right"
