= Yanou =

German trance and Eurodance musician and producer

- Born: Yann Peifer; 6 February 1974 (age 52)
- Origin: Bad Kreuznach, West Germany
- Genres: Trance, Eurodance
- Occupations: Musician, record producer
- Years active: 1997–present
- Labels: Andorfine; Robbins Entertainment; Zooland; AATW
- Formerly of: Beam & Yanou
- Website: http://www.yanou.de

Yann Peifer (born 6 February 1974), known professionally as Yanou, is a German Trance and Eurodance musician and record producer. He is most famous for collaborating on DJ Sammy's 2001 hit "Heaven" with vocalist Do and for being a member of the popular German trance acts Tune Up! with DJ Manian, and Cascada alongside Natalie Horler as well as Manian. Before Yanou worked with Tune Up!, Cascada and DJ Sammy, he produced and wrote tracks for Beam & Yanou in the late 1990s.

== Discography ==
- 2001 "Heaven" – DJ Sammy and Yanou ft. Do, (UK #1, US #8), BPI: 2× Platinum
- 2002 "Heaven (Candlelight Mix)" – DJ Sammy and Yanou ft. Do
- 2002 "On & On" – Yanou ft. Do
- 2004 "Miracle" - Cascada
- 2005 "Everytime We Touch (Yanou's Candlelight Mix)" – Cascada
- 2006 "King of My Castle" – Yanou ft. Liz
- 2007 "Sun Is Shining"- Yanou
- 2007 "What Hurts the Most (Yanou's Candlelight Mix)" – Cascada
- 2008 "A Girl Like You" – Yanou ft. Mark Daviz
- 2008 "Children of the Sun" – Yanou
- 2009 "Brighter Day" – Yanou ft. Anita Davis
- 2009 "Draw the Line (Yanou's Candlelight Mix) – Cascada
- 2010 "Pyromania" - Cascada
- 2011 "San Francisco" – Cascada
- 2011 "Au Revoir" - Cascada
- 2011 "Night Nurse" - Cascada
- 2012 "It's a Fine Day" - John Modena & Yanou
- 2012 "Summer of Love" - Cascada
- 2012 "The Rhythm of the Night" - Cascada
- 2013 "25 Lightyears Away" – Yanou
- 2013 "Glorious" - Cascada
- 2013 "The World Is in My Hands" - Cascada
- 2014 "Bring on the Sun" – Yanou ft. Andreas Johnson
- 2014 "Madness" - Cascada
- 2015 "Reason" - Cascada
- 2017 "Run" - Cascada
- 2018 "Back for Good" - Cascada
- 2019 "Like the Way I Do" - Cascada
- 2020 "I'm Feeling It (In the Air) - Cascada
- 2021 "One Last Dance" - Cascada

=== Beam & Yanou ===
- 1997 "On Y Va"
- 1998 "Paraiso"
- 2000 "Rainbow of Mine"
- 2000 "Sound of Love"
- 2000 "Free Fall"

=== Remixes ===
- 1997 "Shout! (Beam & Yanou Remix)"
- 1997 "Encore! – Le Disc Jockey (Beam & Yanou Remix)"
- 1997 "The Original (Beam & Yanou Remix)"
- 1997 "The Full House (Beam & Yanou Remix)"
- 1998 "Deeper Than Deep (Beam & Yanou Remix)"
- 1998 "Light of Mystery (Beam & Yanou Remix)"
- 1999 "Look at Us (Beam vs. Yanou)"
- 2000 "E Nomine – E Nomine (Beam & Yanou)"
- 2000 "Sinéad O'Connor – Nothing Compares 2 U (Beam & Yanou)"
- 2000 "Love Is the Answer (Beam & Yanou)"
- 2000 "Cosmic Gate – Somewhere Over the Rainbow / Fire Wire (Beam & Yanou)"
- 2001 "Geil (DJ Beam & Yanou)"
- 2001 "Cosmic Gate – Somewhere Over the Rainbow (Part II) (Beam & Yanou)"
