= DJ Manian =

German music producer, DJ, and label owner

- Also known as: Manian, Josh Hill
- Born: Manuel Reuter; 7 July 1978 (age 48)
- Origin: Bonn, West Germany
- Genres: Techno, Eurodance, Hands up
- Occupations: DJ, Record producer and Record label owner
- Years active: 2002–present
- Label: Zooland Records (Owner)
- Formerly of: Cascada, Tune Up!, Spencer and Hill, Bulldozzer, M.Y.C, Ampire, Phalanx, Plazmatek, Liz Kay, Siria, Akira, Diamond, Andy Lopez, Scarf, Aila, TWOLOUD
- Website: manian.de

Manuel Reuter (born 7 July 1978), better known by his stage name DJ Manian or just Manian, is a German DJ and Record producer, owner of Zooland Records label.

== Career ==
DJ Manian was born in 1978 in Bonn, then West Germany.

He has produced a number of singles under several pseudonyms. From September 2007 to September 2013 he contributed to the musical project "Spencer & Hill" under the pseudonym Josh Hill alongside the founder of "vengeance-sound.com" soundset website Manuel Schleis and with former "Verano" member Dennis Nicholls (a. k. a. D-Style), with whom he created the musical project "TWOLOUD" at the end of 2013. However, the duo asked not to be identified immediately: in their performances they carried far face drawn hoods and in the music videos they are usually seen from behind on their single covers, so they are not visible.

Over the years, DJ Manian maintained a number of different musical collaborations, including Bulldozzer, M.Y.C, Ampire, Phalanx, Plazmatek, Liz Kay, and R.I.O. and the now-defunct Tune Up! in addition to Aila, Cerla, Dan Winter, Darren Styles and Crystal Lake. His 2013 release "Don't Stop the Dancing" featuring Carlprit has charted in a number of European singles charts.

He is a member of the Eurodance trio Cascada, alongside fellow DJ Yanou (with whom he has collaborated many times) and Natalie Horler (who has featured as a guest vocalist on some of his songs). In 2014, he joined "TWOLOUD".

== Discography ==
=== Studio albums ===
Year	Album	Peak positions	
Year	Album	AUT	GER
2010	Welcome to the Club	—	—
2013	Hands Up Forever	52	90

=== Compilation albums ===
Year	Album
2010	The Singles 2004-2010

=== Singles ===
Charting

Year	Single	Peak positions					Album
Year	Single	AUT	FRA	NED	SUI	UK	Album
2007	"Heaven" (Manian feat. Aila)	—	—	71	—	107	Welcome to the Club
2007	"Raver's Fantasy"	39	—	—	—	89	Welcome to the Club
2009	"Welcome to the Club"	39	—	—	—	89	Welcome to the Club
2012	"Don't Stop the Dancing" (Manian feat. Carlprit)	48	75	—	55	—	Hands Up Forever
2013	"Tonight" (Manian & Nicco)	58	—	—	—	—	Hands Up Forever
2013	"Just Another Night (Anthem 4)" (Manian & Floorfilla)	—	59	—	—	—	Hands Up Forever

=== Other releases ===
- 2006: Rhythm & Drums / Bounce (DJ Manian vs. Tune Up!)
- 2007: Lovesong
- 2007: Raver's Fantasy
- 2007: The Heat of the Moment (EP)
- 2007: Turn the Tide (Manian feat. Aila)
- 2008: Hold Me Tonight (Manian feat. Aila)
- 2008: Turn The Tide 2k8 (Manian feat. Aila)
- 2009: Ravers in the UK
- 2010: Outta My Head (Darren Styles feat. Manian)
- 2010: Loco
- 2011: Welcome to the Club 2011
- 2011: F.A.Q. (Crystal Lake vs. Manian)
- 2012: Hands Up Forever
- 2013: I'm in Love with the DJ
- 2013: Cinderella (Manian feat. Maury)
- 2013: We Don't Care
