= R.I.O. discography =

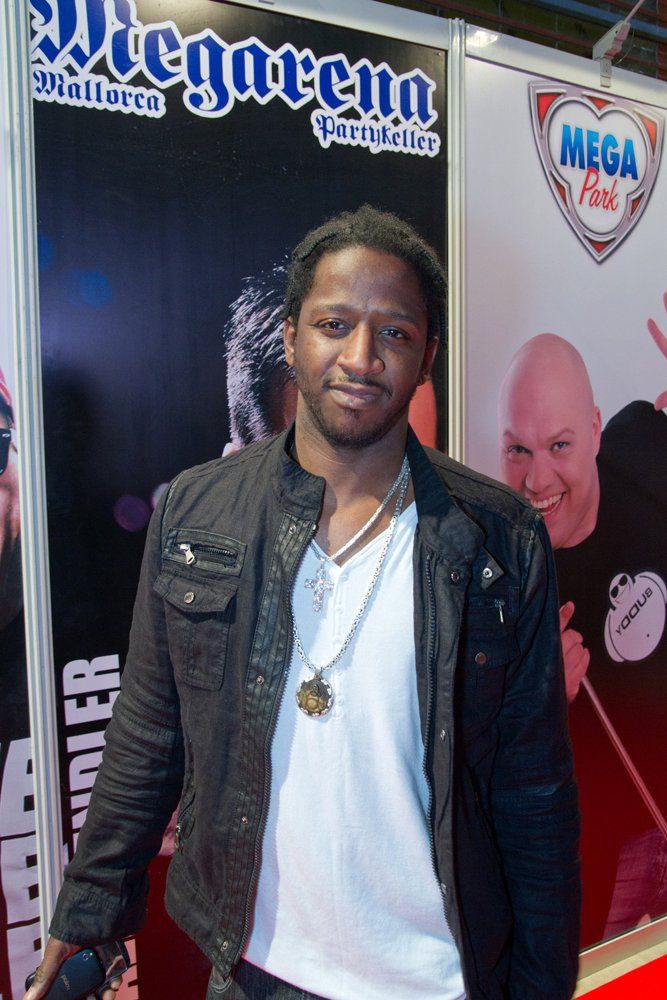
- Tony T, The singer of R.I.O. from 2008 til 2012
- Studio albums: 3
- Singles: 17
- Compilation albums: 3

The discography of German dance band R.I.O. consists of three studio albums, seventeen singles and two singles as a featured artist.

== Albums ==
=== Studio albums ===
Title	Details	Peak chart positions		
Title	Details	GER	AUT	SWI
Shine On (The Album)	Released: February 19, 2010; Label: Zooland Records; Formats: CD, digital download	—	—	—
Sunshine	Released: May 13, 2011; Label: Zoo Digital; Formats: CD, digital download	—	—	49
Turn This Club Around	Released: December 2, 2011; Label: Kontor Records; Formats: CD, digital download	66	28	29
Ready or Not	Released: May 10, 2013; Label: Kontor Records; Formats: CD, digital download	47	26	4
"—" denotes album that did not chart or was not released.

=== Compilation albums ===
Title	Details	Peak chart positions		
Title	Details	GER	AUT	SWI
Greatest Hits	Released: July 20, 2012; Label: Spinnin′ Records; Formats: CD, digital download	—	—	—

== Singles ==
=== As lead artist ===
Year	Single	Peak chart positions								Album
Year	Single	GER	AUT	FRA	NL	NOR	SWE	SWI	UK	Album
2007	"De Janeiro"	—	—	—	14	—	—	—	—	Shine On (The Album)
2008	"Shine On"	25	21	8	43	—	10	17	—	Shine On (The Album)
2008	"When the Sun Comes Down"	63	54	—	22	—	—	62	—	Shine On (The Album)
2009	"After the Love"	65	41	—	66	—	—	—	—	Shine On (The Album)
2009	"Serenade"	97	—	—	—	—	—	—	—	Shine On (The Album)
2010	"Something About You / Watching You" (featuring Liz Kay)	—	—	—	—	—	—	—	—	Shine On (The Album)
2010	"One Heart"	—	—	—	68	—	—	—	—	Shine On (The Album)
2010	"Hot Girl"	—	—	—	90	—	—	—	—	Sunshine
2011	"Like I Love You"	31	35	—	29	—	—	28	—	Sunshine
2011	"Miss Sunshine"	50	44	—	54	—	—	43	—	Sunshine
2011	"One More Night"	—	—	—	—	—	—	—	—	—
2011	"Turn This Club Around" (featuring U-Jean)	3	5	96	43	—	—	1	36	Turn This Club Around and (Deluxe Edition)
2011	"Animal" (featuring U-Jean)	48	33	111	47	—	—	51	—	Turn This Club Around and (Deluxe Edition)
2012	"Party Shaker" (featuring Nicco)	10	10	5	29	8	—	6	—	Turn This Club Around and (Deluxe Edition)
2012	"Summer Jam" (featuring U-Jean)	7	2	39	—	—	—	2	—	Turn This Club Around and (Deluxe Edition)
2013	"Living in Stereo"	70	41	—	—	—	—	32	—	Ready or Not
2013	"Ready or Not" (featuring U-Jean)	54	40	—	—	—	—	64	—	Ready or Not
2013	"Megamix"	19	19	—	—	—	—	—	—	Non-album singles
2013	"Komodo (Hard Nights)" (featuring U-Jean)	58	45	—	—	—	—	45	—	Non-album singles
2014	"One in a Million" (featuring U-Jean)	51	62	—	—	—	—	62	—	Non-album singles
2015	"Thinking of You"	—	—	—	—	—	—	—	—	Non-album singles
2015	"Sun Is Up" (featuring U-Jean)	—	—	—	—	—	—	—	—	Non-album singles
2015	"Cheers to the Club" (featuring U-Jean)	—	—	—	—	—	—	—	—	Non-album singles
2017	"Headlong"	—	—	—	—	—	—	—	—	Non-album singles
2017	"The Sign" (featuring The Vengaboys)	—	—	—	—	—	—	—	—	Non-album singles
2018	"Summer Eyes"	—	—	—	—	—	—	—	—	Non-album singles
2018	"Somebody to Love"	—	—	—	—	—	—	—	—	Non-album singles
2019	"Good Enough" (featuring Dennis Mansfeld)	—	—	—	—	—	—	—	—	Non-album singles
2019	"Shine On" (with Madcon)	—	—	—	—	—	—	—	—	Non-album singles
"—" denotes a single that did not chart or was not released in that territory.

== Remixes ==
Year	Title / Interpret	Notes
2008	"Cool" (R.I.O. Radio Edit) (Lowrida)	Released: 22 February 2008
2008	"Children of the Sun" (R.I.O. Remix) (Yanou)	Released: 27 May 2008
2008	"Turn the Tide" (R.I.O. Remix) (Manian featuring Aila)	Released: 26 September 2008
2009	"Brighter Day" (R.I.O. Radio Edit) (Yanou)	Released: 2 October 2009
2011	"Good Vibe" (R.I.O. Edit) (Good Vibe Crew featuring Cat)	Released: 25 February 2011
2011	"1234" (R.I.O. Remix) (Carlprit)	Released: 9 September 2011
2012	"Rock This Club" (R.I.O. Remix) (King & White)	Released: 27 April 2012
2012	"Je Ne Sais Pas" (R.I.O. Video Edit) (Azuro featuring Elly)	Released: 18 May 2012
2012	"My Life Is a Party" (R.I.O. Edit) (ItaloBrothers)	Released: 27 July 2012
2012	"Supernova" (R.I.O. Radio Edit) (Miami Club featuring Nicci)	Released: 28 September 2012
2013	"Tonight" (R.I.O. Radio Edit) (Manian featuring Nicco)	Released: 8 February 2013
2013	"Maria (I Like It Loud)" (R.I.O. Edit) (Scooter)	Released: 11 October 2013
