= Tony T. =

British singer, rapper and DJ (born 1971)

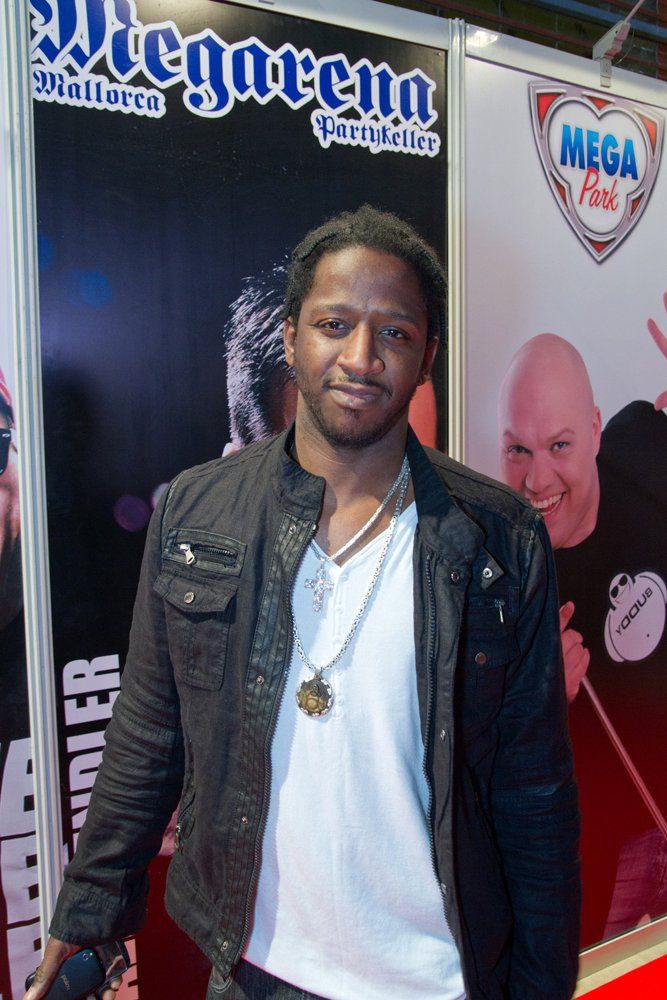

Background information
- Born: Neal Antone Dyer; 29 March 1971 (age 55); London, England
- Occupations: Singer, rapper, DJ
- Years active: 1996–present
- Formerly of: Beat System (1996), R.I.O. (2008–2011)

Neal Antone Dyer (born 29 March 1971), better known by the stage name Tony T., is a British singer, rapper and DJ of Jamaican origin, best known as the frontman of German dance music projects Beat System, Cascada, and R.I.O. His best known hit with R.I.O. was "Turn This Club Around", which reached number 3 in German Singles Chart and topped the Swiss Schweizer Hitparade chart, and was certified gold in both charts.

== Career ==
=== Beginnings ===
Born to Jamaican parents, Dyer resided early on in Brooklyn where he started DJing. After two years, he moved to Germany in 1985 where he worked as a resident DJ at the club Gaslight.

=== 1996–1998: Beat System ===
In the 1990s, he was a member of the dance music project Beat System which released "Noise Dance", a limited release in Germany. Then came the singles "Dance Romance" and "Dance Romance Chapter Two" on Insania Records and "Stay with Me", produced by Axel Breitung. Changing labels and signing with Blow Up, the group released "Fresh", a cover of the Kool & the Gang song that charted in Germany, followed by "Reggae Night", a Jimmy Cliff cover. The label Intercord released Beat System's debut and only album Refreshiator after which the project was dropped.

=== 2008–2012: R.I.O. ===
In 2008, Tony T was a founding member of the German dance project R.I.O. with Yann Pfeifer (Yanou) and Manuel Reuter (DJ Manian). After the debut single "De Janeiro / R.I.O.", the trio with Tony T. as frontman of the band had a string of hits in Germany, Austria and Switzerland, like "Shine On" from the Shine On (The Album), followed by "When the Sun Comes Down", "Hot Girl", "Like I Love You" and "Miss Sunshine". But R.I.O.'s hit "Turn This Club Around" featuring the vocals of U-Jean proved to be an international success reaching No. 5 in Austria, No. 3 in Germany, No. 1 in Switzerland also charting in the UK, Scotland, Netherlands, as well as Belgium, Canada. The band released same titled album Turn This Club Around with the further hit "Animal" from the album.

=== 2012–: Solo career / DNGRS Crew ===
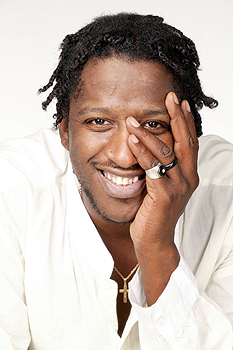
Tony T.

Tony T. left the R.I.O. project in 2012 to launch a solo career. His first solo releaser was "Way to Rio". He was featured in "Everybody" from Mike Candys also featuring Evelyn. He also had collaborations such as with Darius & Finlay in "Phenomenon" and with Soulwash featured in "No Games". In 2013, he was featured in the hit "Want U Now" by Ardian Bujupi, a finalist in the German music competition Deutschland sucht den Superstar and in "Beautiful Life" by Sasha Lopez also featuring Big Ali.

In May 2013, he co-founded DNGRS Crew with rappers Carlprit and Marlon B. Their first single together was "Dangerous" credited to DJ Mase vs DNGRS Crew, released on Kontor Records.

In 2022, he teamed up with singer Iraj and they did a cover of "Truth Hurts".

== Discography ==
=== Albums ===
with Beat System

- 1996: Refreshiator

with R.I.O.

- 2008: Shine On (The Album)
- 2011: Sunshine
- 2011: Turn This Club Around

=== Singles ===
with Beat System

Single	Year	Peak chart positions					Album
Single	Year	AUT	BEL^{FL}	BEL^{WA}	FRA	GER	Album
"Fresh"	1996	29	37	18	15	32	Refreshinator
"Reggae Night"	1996	–	36	–	–	93	Refreshinator
"—" denotes singles that did not chart

with R.I.O.

Single	Year	Peak chart positions										Album
Single	Year	AUT	CAN	ESP	FRA	GER	ITA	NLD	SWE	SWI	UK	Album
"De Janeiro"	2007	–	–	–	–	–	–	9	—	—	—	Shine On (The Album)
"Shine On"	2008	21	–	22	8	25	8	20	10	17	—	Shine On (The Album)
"When the Sun Comes Down"	2008	54	–	9	–	63	–	9	–	62	—	Shine On (The Album)
"After the Love"	2009	41	–	–	–	65	–	66	—	—	—	Shine On (The Album)
"Serenade"	2009	–	–	–	–	97	—	—	—	—	—	Shine On (The Album)
"One Heart"	2010	–	–	–	–	–	–	24	—	—	—	Shine On (The Album)
"Hot Girl"	2010	–	–	–	–	–	–	90	—	—	—	Sunshine
"Like I Love You"	2011	35	–	–	–	31	–	24	–	28	—	Sunshine
"Miss Sunshine"	2011	44	–	–	–	50	–	17	–	43	—	Sunshine
"Turn This Club Around" (feat. U-Jean)	2011	5	95	–	96	3	–	34	–	1	36	Turn This Club Around
"Animal" (feat. U-Jean)	2011	33	–	–	111	48	–	26	–	51	—	Turn This Club Around
"—" denotes singles that did not chart

=== Featured in ===
Single	Year	Peak chart positions					Album
Single	Year	AUT	CZE	GER	SVK	SWI	Album
"Phenomenon" (Darius & Finlay feat. Tony T.)	2012	26	—	—	—	—	
"Everybody" (Mike Candys feat. Evelyn & Tony T.)	2013	14	57	40	69	14	
"Beautiful Life" (Sasha Lopez feat. Tony T. and Big Ali)	2013	–	49	—	—	—	
"Break My Stride" (Bodybangers feat. Tony T.)	2013	62	–	90	—	—	
"Heart It Tonight" (ONdray feat. Tony T.)	2014	–	47	—	—	—	
"—" denotes singles that did not chart

- 2012: "No Games" (Soulwash feat. Tony T.)
- 2013: "Want U Now" (Ardian Bujupi feat. Tony T.)
- 2013: "Breaking the Ice" (Bodybangers feat. Tony T.)
- 2013: "Summer's Gone" (Sash! feat. Tony T.)
- 2017: "Color of Love" (Stephan F feat. Tony T.)
