= Sunshine (R.I.O. album) =

Studio album by R.I.O.
- Released: 13 May 2011
- Recorded: 2007–2010
- Genre: Dance
- Label: Roxy Recordings

R.I.O. chronology
Shine On (The Album) (2010)	Sunshine (2011)	Turn This Club Around (2011)

Sunshine is the second studio album from German Dance-Band R.I.O. It was first released on 13 May 2011 in Germany. The album peaked at number 29 on the Swiss Albums Chart.

== Track listing ==
Standard listing
No.	Title	Length
1.	"Miss Sunshine"	3:22
2.	"Like I Love You"	3:23
3.	"Shine On"	3:22
4.	"When the Sun Comes Down"	3:22
5.	"Hot Girl"	3:39
6.	"Serenade"	3:35
7.	"Watching You" (feat. Liz Kay)	3:52
8.	"After the Love"	3:34
9.	"De Janeiro"	3:24
10.	"Can You Feel It"	3:23
11.	"Something About You" (feat. Liz Kay)	3:49
12.	"One Heart"	3:36
13.	"Lay Down"	3:14
14.	"Open Up Your Heart"	3:49

Bonus tracks
No.	Title	Length
15.	"Miss Sunshine" (Video Edit)	3:18
16.	"Shine On" (Spencer & Hill Radio Edit)	3:02
17.	"De Janeiro" (S&H Project Radio Edit)	3:30

== Charts ==
Chart (2011)	Peak position
Swiss Albums (Schweizer Hitparade)	29

== Release history ==
Country	Date	Format	Label
Germany	13 May 2011	CD single, digital download	Kontor Records
