= Turn This Club Around =

Turn This Club Around may refer to:

- Turn This Club Around (song), a 2011 single by R.I.O. featuring U-Jean
- Turn This Club Around (album), a 2011 album by R.I.O.
