= Like I Love You (disambiguation) =

"Like I Love You" is a 2002 song by Justin Timberlake.

Like I Love You may also refer to:

- "Like I Love You" (R.I.O. song), 2011
- "Like I Love You", a 1963 single by Eden Kane
- "Like I Love You", a 1965 song by Australian singer Peter Doyle
- "Like I Love You", a 1966 song by The Fifth Estate, written by Wayne Wadhams and Don Askew
- "Like I Love You", a 1997 song by Amy Grant from the album Behind the Eyes
- "Like I Love You", a 2012 song by Zzbra from the album Zzbra: Original Motion Picture Soundtrack
- "He Will Break Your Heart", aka "He Don't Love You (Like I Love You)", song by Jerry Butler
- "L.I.L.Y. (Like I Love You)", a 2008 song by Kate Ryan
