= Summer Air =

2016 song by ItaloBrothers

Single by ItaloBrothers
- Released: 30 September 2016
- Length: 3:03
- Label: Zooland
- Songwriters: Kristian Sandberg; Mathias Metten; Dietmar Pollmann; Hanno Lohse
- Producers: Kristian Sandberg; Hanno Lohse; Zacharias Adrian

ItaloBrothers singles chronology
| "Generation Party" (2016) | "Summer Air" (2016) | "Hasselhoff 2017" (2017) |

Music video
- "Summer Air" on YouTube

"Summer Air" is a song by German dance group ItaloBrothers. The song was released on 30 September 2016.

== Reception ==
Sebastian Wernke-Schmiesing of Dance-Charts.de wrote that the song blends dance-pop and tropical sounds, with contemporary vocal chops in the drop and verse sections in the break, giving an atmosphere that evokes a longing for summer, holidays, and faraway places. In addition, the track was described as uplifting and the melody head-turning. Melvin Peters of Nieuweplaat.nl wrote that a combination of factors made the track promising, thanks to its rhythm, catchy lyrics, summery music video and eye-catching cover art.

The song reached the top 10 of the charts in Finland, Norway and Sweden. When asked about the success of "Summer Air" and "Stamp on the Ground", the band replied: "It's simply overwhelming. It's really hard to understand that our music reaches so many people around the globe. I mean, we had no expectations at all when we started the project in Kris' basement in 2005. And here we are – still!"

== Track listing ==
Digital download and streaming
| No. | Title | Length |
|---|---|---|
| 1. | "Summer Air" | 3:03 |

Digital download and streaming
| No. | Title | Length |
|---|---|---|
| 1. | "Summer Air" (DJ Gollum featuring DJ Cap UK radio edit) | 3:27 |
| 2. | "Summer Air" (DJ Gollum featuring DJ Cap UK remix) | 4:30 |

== Charts ==
=== Weekly charts ===
| Chart (2017) | Peak position |
|---|---|
| Austria (Ö3 Austria Top 40) | 14 |
| Belgium (Ultratip Bubbling Under Flanders) | 6 |
| Belgium (Ultratip Bubbling Under Wallonia) | 17 |
| Czech Republic Singles Digital (ČNS IFPI) | 45 |
| Denmark (Tracklisten) | 14 |
| Finland (Suomen virallinen lista) | 6 |
| Germany (GfK) | 34 |
| Norway (VG-lista) | 2 |
| Slovakia Singles Digital (ČNS IFPI) | 46 |
| Sweden (Sverigetopplistan) | 10 |
| Switzerland (Schweizer Hitparade) | 36 |
| US Hot Dance/Electronic Songs (Billboard) | 48 |

=== Year-end charts ===
| Chart (2017) | Position |
|---|---|
| Denmark (Tracklisten) | 48 |
| Sweden (Sverigetopplistan) | 46 |

== Certifications ==
| Region | Certification | Certified units/sales |
|---|---|---|
| Austria (IFPI Austria) | Gold | 15,000^{‡} |
| Canada (Music Canada) | Gold | 40,000^{‡} |
| Denmark (IFPI Danmark) | 2× Platinum | 180,000^{‡} |
| Germany (BVMI) | Platinum | 400,000^{‡} |
| Norway (IFPI Norway) | 3× Platinum | 180,000^{‡} |
| Switzerland (IFPI Switzerland) | Gold | 15,000^{‡} |
Streaming
| Sweden (GLF) | 3× Platinum | 24,000,000^{†} |
^{‡} Sales+streaming figures based on certification alone.^{†} Streaming-only figures based on certification alone.

== Release history ==
| Region | Date | Format | Version | Label | Ref. |
|---|---|---|---|---|---|
| Various | 30 September 2016 | Digital download; streaming | Original | Zooland | |
| Various | 24 February 2017 | Digital download; streaming | DJ Gollum featuring DJ Cap UK remix | Zooland | |
| Various | 30 May 2017 | Digital download; streaming | Original | Ultra; Sony | |
| Italy | 4 August 2017 | Radio airplay | Original | Time | |
