= Dance Nation =

Dance nation may refer to:

- Dance Nation (dance group), a Dutch dance group
- Dance Nation (play), by Clare Barron
- Dance Nation (record label), a British independent record label, a subsidiary of Ministry of Sound
- Dance Nation (TV channel), a music TV Channel, since rebranded to Chart Show Dance
