= Ready or Not (R.I.O. song) =

Single by R.I.O. featuring U-Jean

from the album Ready or Not
- Released: 10 May 2013
- Recorded: 2013
- Genre: Dance, Europop
- Length: 3:27
- Label: Kontor Records
- Songwriter(s): Yann Peifer, Manuel Reuter, Andres Ballinas
- Producer(s): Yann Peifer, Manuel Reuter

R.I.O. singles chronology
"Living in Stereo" (2013)	"Ready or Not" (2013)	"Megamix" (2013)

U-Jean singles chronology
"Flying" (2012)	"Ready or Not" (2013)	"Komodo (Hard Nights)" (2013)

"Ready or Not" is a song by German dance band R.I.O., featuring vocals from Pop, R&B and Hip-Hop singer U-Jean. The song was released in Germany as a digital download on 10 May 2013. The song has charted in Austria, Germany and Switzerland. The song was written by Yann Peifer, Manuel Reuter and Andres Ballinas.

== Music video ==
A music video to accompany the release of "Ready or Not" was first released onto YouTube on 10 May 2013 at a total length of three minutes and thirty-three seconds.

== Track listing ==
Digital download
No.	Title	Length
1.	"Ready or Not" (Video Edit) (feat. U-Jean)	3:27
2.	"Ready or Not" (Klaas Radio Edit) (feat. U-Jean)	3:20
3.	"Ready or Not" (Steve Modana Radio Edit) (feat. U-Jean)	3:25
4.	"Ready or Not" (Extended Mix) (feat. U-Jean)	4:41
5.	"Ready or Not" (Klaas Extended Mix) (feat. U-Jean)	5:20
6.	"Ready or Not" (Ryan T. & Rick M. Remix) (feat. U-Jean)	5:00
7.	"Ready or Not" (Steve Modana Remix) (feat. U-Jean)	4:30

== Chart performance ==
=== Weekly charts ===
Chart (2013)	Peak position
Austria (Ö3 Austria Top 40)	40
Germany (GfK)	54
Poland (Dance Top 50)	24
Switzerland (Schweizer Hitparade)	64

== Release history ==
Region	Date	Format	Label
Germany	10 May 2013	Digital Download	Kontor Records
