= Living in Stereo =

Single by R.I.O.
- Released: 15 March 2013
- Recorded: 2012–2013
- Length: 3:10
- Label: Kontor Records
- Songwriter(s): Andres Ballinas; Yann Peifer; Manuel Reuter

R.I.O. singles chronology
"Summer Jam" (2012)	"Living in Stereo" (2013)	"Ready or Not" (2013)

"Living in Stereo" is a song by German dance band R.I.O., released for digital download in Germany on 15 March 2013.

"Living in Stereo" achieved minor commercial success, peaking at number 41 on the Ö3 Austria Top 40, number 70 on the Official German Charts and number 32 on the Schweizer Hitparade Chart.

== Music video ==
A music video to accompany the release of "Living in Stereo" was first released onto YouTube on March 15, 2013 at a total length of three minutes and seventeen seconds.

== Track listing ==
Digital download
No.	Title	Length
1.	"Living in Stereo" (Video Edit)	3:10
2.	"Living in Stereo" (Extended Mix)	4:50
3.	"Living in Stereo" (Steve Modana Radio Edit)	3:28
4.	"Living in Stereo" (Steve Modana Remix)	4:32
5.	"Living in Stereo" (Money G Radio Edit)	3:20
6.	"Living in Stereo" (Money G Remix)	5:24

== Chart performance ==
=== Weekly charts ===
Chart (2013)	Peak position
Austria (Ö3 Austria Top 40)	41
Germany (GfK)	70
Switzerland (Schweizer Hitparade)	32

== Release history ==
Region	Date	Format	Label
Germany	15 March 2013	Digital Download	Kontor Records
