= Dance Nation (dance group) =

Dutch EDM ensemble

- Also known as: Double Nation, R.I.P., Sean & Kim
- Origin: Netherlands
- Genres: Trance; house
- Years active: 2001–present
- Labels: In Trance We Trust (Black Hole); Noculan Music; Purple Eye Entertainment; Avex Productions
- Members: Rob Janssen; Brad John Grobler

Dance Nation is a Dutch electronic dance music group founded in 2001 by Rob Janssen and Brad Grobler. The group's discography includes the single "Sunshine" (2001). They gained popularity in Europe and Japan, blending Eurodance and house styles, and remain active today.

== Biography ==
=== Early years (2001–2003) ===
Dance Nation released their debut single "Sunshine” in 2001, which was followed by their 2002 singles "Dance" and "Words", and "You Take Me Away" in 2003.

In 2003, they collaborated with The Lovestern Galaktika Project on the single "My First Love."

=== 2004–2005 ===
In response to legal proceedings in 2004, Dance Nation began performing under various aliases such as "Double Nation", "Cyber Nation," and "Sean & Kim." Officially, however, they retained their original name.

Following a label crisis affecting Dance Nation, as well as other trance artists such as Noémi and 666, Dance Nation moved to Japan. The general shift in popular music genres occurring in Europe (moving through house, hard house, and electro) was also a contributing factor on the move. There, they focused on producing music geared toward different audiences, (e.g., trance projects for the Japanese market and house projects for the European one), releasing singles like "Beachtime" and "I'm Gonna Get You" in 2005 in Japan and Europe, respectively.

Trance Champion, released in 2005 by the Japanese label Avex Productions, contained all the previously released singles, including "Celebrate Your Life."

=== 2006–2021 ===
Prior to the summer of 2006, Dance Nation released the single "Ridin' High,", marking a shift in their sound towards the European house music market. The following year, they released "Move Your Love," a collaborative rework of Barthez's "On The Move," originally released in 2000. Compilations were also released containing the early single "Move Your Love," as well as additional singles "Celebrate Your Life," "Reach For The Light,” and "I'm Gonna Get You." Tracks such as "Fired Up," "Lovin Arms," and "Summer Rain" were also released.

The year 2010 saw the release of two house singles, "Surround Me" and "Great Divide." Their collaborative track with dance-project R.I.O., "Miss Sunshine,” was released with some chart success in 2011. "Storm" followed in 2015.

=== "Rise & Shine" (2002/2022) ===
The Dance Nation track, "Rise & Shine,” produced in 2002, was originally written as a potential second single following "Sunshine,” but "Dance!" was eventually chosen. The "Ralphie B Tech Mix" of "Rise & Shine" was included on the 2002 vinyl "Dance/Rise & Shine," released by Black Hole Recordings (In Trance We Trust). The additional mixes in the 2022 digital package release had not been published before. Dutch producer and DJ Ralph Barendse put together a "Ralphie B's Tech Edit" exclusively for the digital release.

== Discography ==
=== Singles ===
Release year	Title	Notes
2001	"Sunshine"	
2002	"Dance"	
2002	"Words"	
2003	"My First Love"	Lovestern Galaktika Project Meets Dance Nation
2003	"You Take Me Away"	
2005	"I'm Gonna Get You"	
2005	"Stop the Seasons in the Sun"	
2005	"Beachtime"	
2006	"Reach for the Light"	
2006	"Move Your Love"	
2007	"Ridin' High"	
2008	"Apologize"	
2009	"Sunshine 2009"	vs. Shaun Baker
2010	"Great Divide"	
2010	"Surround Me"	
2012	"Storm"	
2022	"Rise & Shine"	The Ralphie B remix was released on vinyl in 2002. The additional mixes of "Rise & Shine" date from the same time period and have never been published before.
2025	"Hold On"	

=== Albums ===
Release year	Title
2005	Trance Champion
2007	One Nation
2008	Around The World

=== Compilations ===
Release year	Title
2006	Christmas Trance
2009	Vocal Trance Years 2001–2004
2009	Vocal Trance Years 2005–2009

=== Extra ===
Year	Title	Notes
2002	"Joy to the World"	Recently added to the Christmas Trance compilation
2002	"Merry X-Mas (War is Over)"	Recently added to the Christmas Trance compilation
2004	"Beethoven's 9th Symphony"	Never added to an official release

== Track listing ==
=== Singles ===
Sunshine (2001)

Sunshine (2001)
No.	Title	{{{extra_column}}}	Length
1.	"Sunshine (Original Vocal Radio Edit)"		3:37
2.	"Sunshine (Original Vocal Mix)"		6:45
3.	"Sunshine (Wippenberg Remix)"	Wippenberg	6:55
4.	"Sunshine (Kevin C. Cox Remix)"	Kevin C. Cox	5:02
5.	"Sunshine (Alien Factory Remix)"	Alien Factory	7:11
6.	"Sunshine (Bradski & Jenski Mix)"	Bradski & Jenski	6:57

Dance (2002)

Dance (2002)
No.	Title	{{{extra_column}}}	Length
1.	"Dance! (Radio Mix)"		3:18
2.	"Dance! (Extended Mix)"		3:18
3.	"Dance! (Original Mix)"		8:09
4.	"Dance! (DJ Team Trance Mix)"	DJ Team	7:28
5.	"Dance! (Fire & Ice Remix)"	Fire & Ice (trance group)	7:26
6.	"Dance! (Magik Muzik Remix)"	Magik Muzik	6:28

Words (2002)

Words (2002)
No.	Title	Length

1. Original Radio Edit
2. Bradski & Jenski Radio Edit
3. Album Version
4. Original Extended Mix
5. Bradski & Jenski Extended Mix
6. Noémi Remix
7. Magik Muzik Remix
8. You (Bonus Track)

My First Love (2003)

1. Single Edit
2. Extended Version
3. Axel Coon Remix
4. Bradsky & Jensky Remix

You Take Me Away (2003)

1. Radio Edit
2. Video Edit
3. Original Extended Mix
4. Bradski & Jenski Dub Mix
5. Flashrider Remix
6. Master Blaster Remix
7. Blair Bitch Remix

Stop the Seasons in the Sun (2005)

1. Radio Edit
2. Extended Mix

I'm Gonna Get You (2005)

1. Radio Edit
2. Extended Vocal Mix
3. Bradski & Jenski Remix
4. DJ Zany Remix
5. Chew Fu Phat Remix

Beachtime (2005)

1. Radio Edit
2. Extended Mix

Move Your Love (2005)

1. Move Your Love Radio Mix
2. Inspiration Vibes Radio Mix
3. Extended Radio Mix
4. Inspiration Vibes Extended Mix
5. Dance Nation DJ Extended Mix
6. Schampoo Remix
7. Beholder & Ballistic Remix

Reach for the Light (2006)

1. Dance Nation Radio Mix
2. Dance Nation Extended Mix
3. HardStyle Remix

Ridin' High (2007)

1. Radio Edit
2. Original Extended Mix
3. Hi_Tack Remix

Great Divide (2010)

1. Radio Edit
2. Radio Extended Mix
3. Frontier Remix
4. Dub Extended
5. Manox Radio Edit
6. Manox Extended Remix
7. Sun Kidz Radio Cut
8. Sun Kidz Extended Mix
9. Mauricio Black Remix

Storm (2012)

1. Storm (Vocal Extended)
2. Storm (Extended Yaroon Remix)
3. Storm (Vocal Extended Ryan Watts Remix)
4. Storm (Frontier Extended Mix)
5. Storm (Radio Edit)

Rise & Shine (2022)

1. Rise & Shine (Original Radio Edit)
2. Rise & Shine (Vocal Trance Radio Edit)
3. Rise & Shine (Ralphie B's Tech Edit)
4. Rise & Shine (DJ Team Edit)
5. Rise & Shine (Vocal Extended Mix)
6. Rise & Shine (Bradski & Jenski Vocal Trance Mix)
7. Rise & Shine (Ralphie B's Tech Mix)

Hold On (2025)

1. Hold On
2. Hold On (Extended Mix)

=== Albums ===
Trance Champion (2005)

1. Sunshine (Japanese Live Mix)
2. Seasons in the Sun (Japanese Live Mix)
3. Beachtime (Japanese Live Mix)
4. Wa Is Not
5. Livin' on a Prayer
6. You Take Me Away
7. Move Your Love
8. Please Don't Go
9. I'm Gonna Get You
10. Rise and Shine
11. Dance
12. Celebrate Your Life
13. Words
14. Falling for You
15. Move Your Love (Sham-Poo Remix)
16. Sunshine (Wippenberg Remix)
17. Oh Summer Vacation (Extended Mix)

One Nation (2007)

1. Zip
2. Sunshine 2006 (Shohei Matsumoto Remix)
3. Reach for the Light
4. Ridin' High
5. Everybody's Free
6. In the Summertime
7. Pump This Party
8. Higher than Love
9. Let Love Shine
10. You Lift Me Up
11. Fired Up
12. Bring Back Your Love
13. Move Your Love (Sham-Poo Remix)
14. Have Yourself a Merry Little Christmas
15. Livin' on a Prayer
16. Ridin' High (Hi_Tack Remix)
17. Footloose

Around the World (2008)

1. Sunshine (Dance Nation DJ team Radio edit)
2. Superstar
3. Set me free
4. Move your love
5. Sunlight
6. Beautiful
7. Rush
8. V.I.P.
9. Take me
10. I believe
11. Feel the power
12. Reach for you
13. One million reasons
14. Sunlight (hyper trance mix)
15. Move your love (Shohei Matsumoto Remix)
16. Real thing (DJ Tora Remix)

=== Compilations ===
Christmas Trance (2006)

1. Sean & Kim - Winter Snow (Intro)
2. Castalia feat. Kim - All I Want for Christmas Is You
3. Cyber X feat. Ray Parker - Last Christmas
4. Watergate - Merry Christmas Mr. Lawrence (Heart of Asia)
5. D-Nation feat. Kim - Happy XMas (War Is Over)
6. Hiver & Hammer feat. Karyn White - Wonderful Christmastime
7. Orion Too feat. Caitlin - White Christmas
8. Castalia - Jingle Bells
9. Plasticman - Rudolph the Red Nose Reindeer
10. Celtic Dreamer feat. Dorothy - Santa Claus Is Coming to Town
11. Cyber Nation feat. Ho! Ho! Ho! - Joy to the World
12. Cyber X feat. Jody Watley - My Love, Santa Claus
13. Merry X-Mas & Minimalistix - Winter Wonderland
14. Cyber Nation feat. Sean & Kim - Have Yourself a Merry Little Christmas
15. Orion Too feat. Caitlin - First of May
16. Cyber X feat. SWANK (members from Rockapella) - It's Christmas Carols I Hear
17. Cyber X feat. Taylor Dayne - Promise
18. Sunshine Girl - Amazing Grace
19. Angels - Ave Maria
20. Cyber X feat. Jody Watley - Silent Night
21. Merry X-Mas & Minimalistix - O Holy Night

Bonuses

22. S.T.F. feat. Keen - You fill me up
23. Samantha Fox - A Question of Honour
