= Herbert Schwamborn =

Zimbabwean born film and music producer

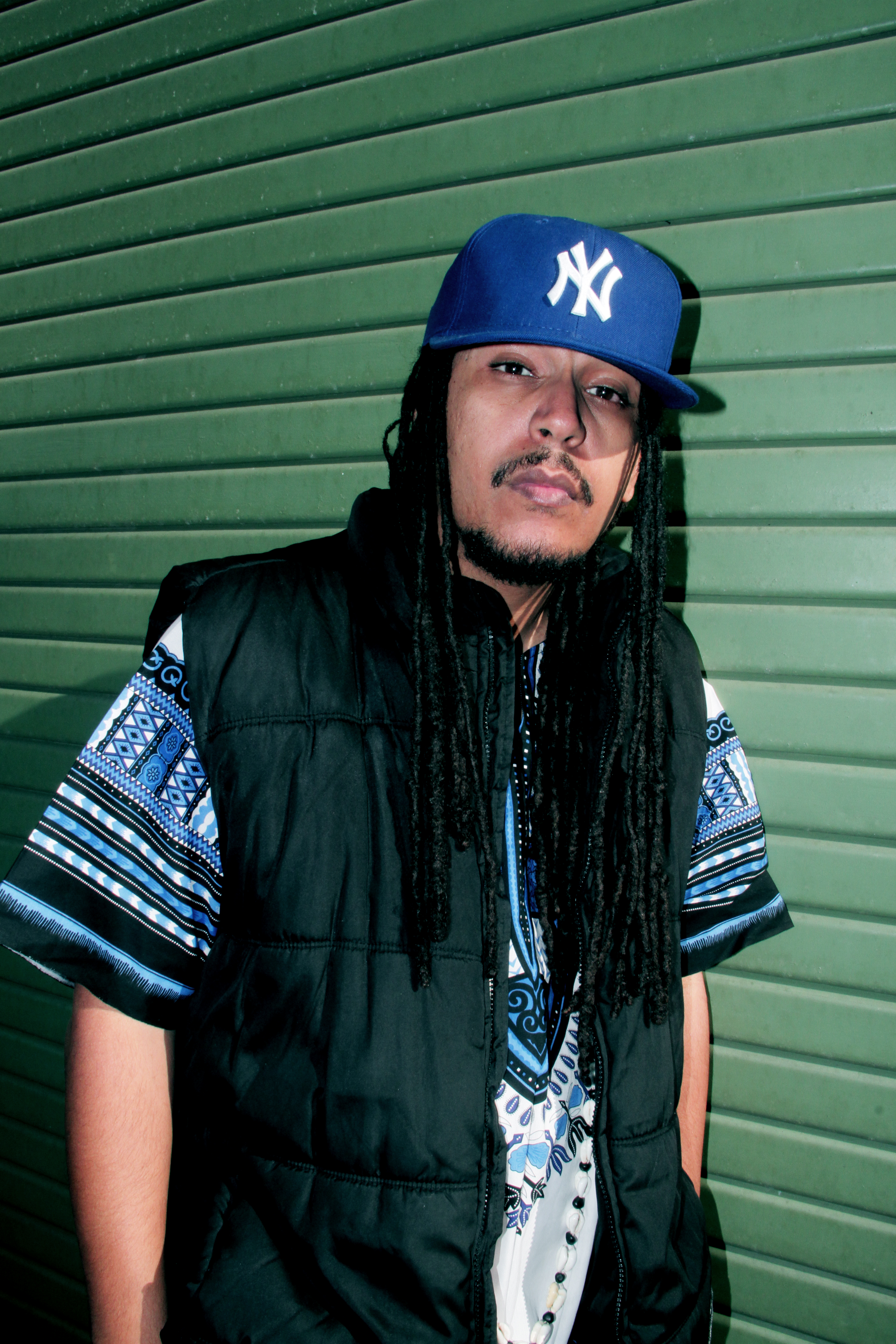
- Herbert Schwamborn in 2016

Background information
- Born: Herbert Willi Schwamborn
- Origin: Harare, Zimbabwe
- Genres: Hip hop, electronic
- Occupations: Director, Producer, Rapper
- Years active: 1989 - Present
- Label: Gandanga Music Zimbabwe
- Website: www.gandanga.com

Herbert Willi Schwamborn is a Zimbabwean born film and music producer, also known by his artist name of Metaphysics. He is most famous for being a member of the multi-platinum selling German band Söhne Mannheims (Sons of Mannheim). He is also the founder of Gandanga Music Zimbabwe, a record label based in Zimbabwe and Germany.

== Early life ==
He was born in 1973 in the Mbare suburb of Salisbury, Rhodesia to a German father and Zimbabwean mother.

== Music career ==
Herbert began his career as a radio host on Zimbabwean radio (Radio1) while he was still in High School, the radio show "Young Zimbabwe" targeted teen related issues. During his early years in radio Herbert began experimenting with music production and formed one of Zimbabwe's first Hip-Hop groups "Lethal Language" the group was featured in the USA based magazine The Source . In 1992 Herbert formed the group "A Peace Of Ebony" which went on to break radio chart history in Zimbabwe with a song titled "Pretend It Never Happened".

=== Brief Discography ===
- A Peace Of Ebony - From The Native Tongue (Teal Trutone)
- Metaphysics - Elevated Perception (Swamp Records Germany)
- Metaphysics - Digital Garden (Pyramid Music)
- Metaphysics - Black Butterfly (Gandanga Music Zimbabwe)
- Migrant Souls - Migrant Souls (Pyramid Music)

Features

- Mellowbag – Day To Day (Net Records)
- Xavier Naidoo - I’d Be Waiting (Sony Universal)
- Nena – Chokma (BMG)
- Deks And Mics 2 – Decks And Mics
- One Accord – Bang Bang Bang
- Snoek Chestnut – Summer Time
- Clueso – Text Und Ton (Sony)
- Clueso – The Disk (Sony)
- Splash LP – (BMG)
- Raw Artistic Souls – Bathanga Vibes (Raw Artistic)
- Buju Banton – Over There (APOC Records)
- Slum Village – I Believe (APOC Records)
- Mr. Vegas - Move (Zuwa Entertainment)

== Film and television ==
Herbert Schwamborn produces and directs film and music videos, he has worked on both sides of the camera as both host, actor and producer.

- Peace Of Ebony - Vuka Video produced by Deveraux Harris and Associates.
- Shell Road to Fame - Host for SABC television show.
- Big Time - Lead role in feature film produced by Olly Maruma.
- Makendlas - Director (music video)
- Metaphysics - Director (music video)
- William Matetwa - Director (music video)
- Chuff Kop - Director (music video)
- Mickey Inity - Director (music video)
- Carlprit - Director (music video)
- Zim Vibes - Director (short film)
- Hustlers Academy - Director (documentary in production)
