= Animal (R.I.O. song) =

Single by R.I.O. featuring U-Jean

from the album Turn This Club Around
- Released: 2 December 2011
- Recorded: 2011
- Genre: Progressive house, eurodance, house
- Length: 3:32
- Label: Kontor Records
- Songwriters: Yann Peifer, Manuel Reuter, Andres Ballinas
- Producers: Yann Peifer, Manuel Reuter, Avicii

R.I.O. singles chronology
"Turn This Club Around" (2011)	"Animal" (2011)	"Party Shaker" (2012)

U-Jean singles chronology
"Turn This Club Around" (2011)	"Animal" (2011)	"That Girl" (2012)

Music video
- "Animal" (Official) on YouTube

"Animal" is a song by German dance music band R.I.O., featuring vocals from pop, R&B and hip-hop singer U-Jean. The song was written by Yann Peifer, Manuel Reuter and Andres Ballinas. It was released in Germany as a download on 2 December 2011.

The synth hook during the chorus has drawn comparisons to Avicii’s 2011 hit Levels due to its similar sound and melody.

However, Tim Bergling (Avicii) is not credited as a writer on the track.

== Music video ==
A music video to accompany the release of "Animal" was first released onto YouTube on 29 November 2011 at a total length of three minutes and forty-two seconds.

== Track listing ==
Digital download

1. "Animal" (Video Edit) – 3:32
2. "Animal" (Extended Mix) – 5:38
3. "Animal" (Spankers Edit) – 3:50
4. "Animal" (Spankers Remix) – 6:05

== Credits and personnel ==
- Lead vocals – R.I.O. and U-Jean
- Producers – Yann Peifer, Manuel Reuter, Tim Bergling
- Lyrics – Yann Peifer, Manuel Reuter, Andres Ballinas
- Label: Kontor Records

== Charts ==
Chart (2011–12)	Peak position
Austria (Ö3 Austria Top 40)	33
France (SNEP)	111
Germany (GfK)	48
Netherlands (Dutch Top 40)	26
Netherlands (Single Top 100)	47
Switzerland (Schweizer Hitparade)	51

== Release history ==
Region	Date	Format	Label
Germany	2 December 2011	Digital Download	Kontor Records
