= Mischa Daniels =

Dutch music producer and DJ

Mischa Daniels is a Dutch music producer and DJ. He is also the founder and CEO of Fame record label geared towards dance and electro house music. His biggest success has been "That Girl" featuring U-Jean that charted on the German Singles Chart. He has also collaborated with a number of artists notably J-Son with the 2010 hit "Where You Wanna Go" and the 2011 follow-up "Simple Man" in collaboration with Sandro Monte and also featuring J-son.

== Discography ==
=== Singles ===
| Year | Title | Chart positions | |
| Year | Title | BEL (Fl) | GER |
|---|---|---|---|
| 2010 | "Where You Wanna Go" (feat. J-Son) | 50 | – |
| 2011 | "Simple Man" (with Sandro Monte feat. J-Son) | – | – |
| 2012 | "That Girl" (feat. U-Jean) | – | 95 |

Features on

- 2013: "I Can't Live Without You" (Sharon Doorson feat. Mischa Daniels)
