= Jaicko =

Jaicko Lawrence
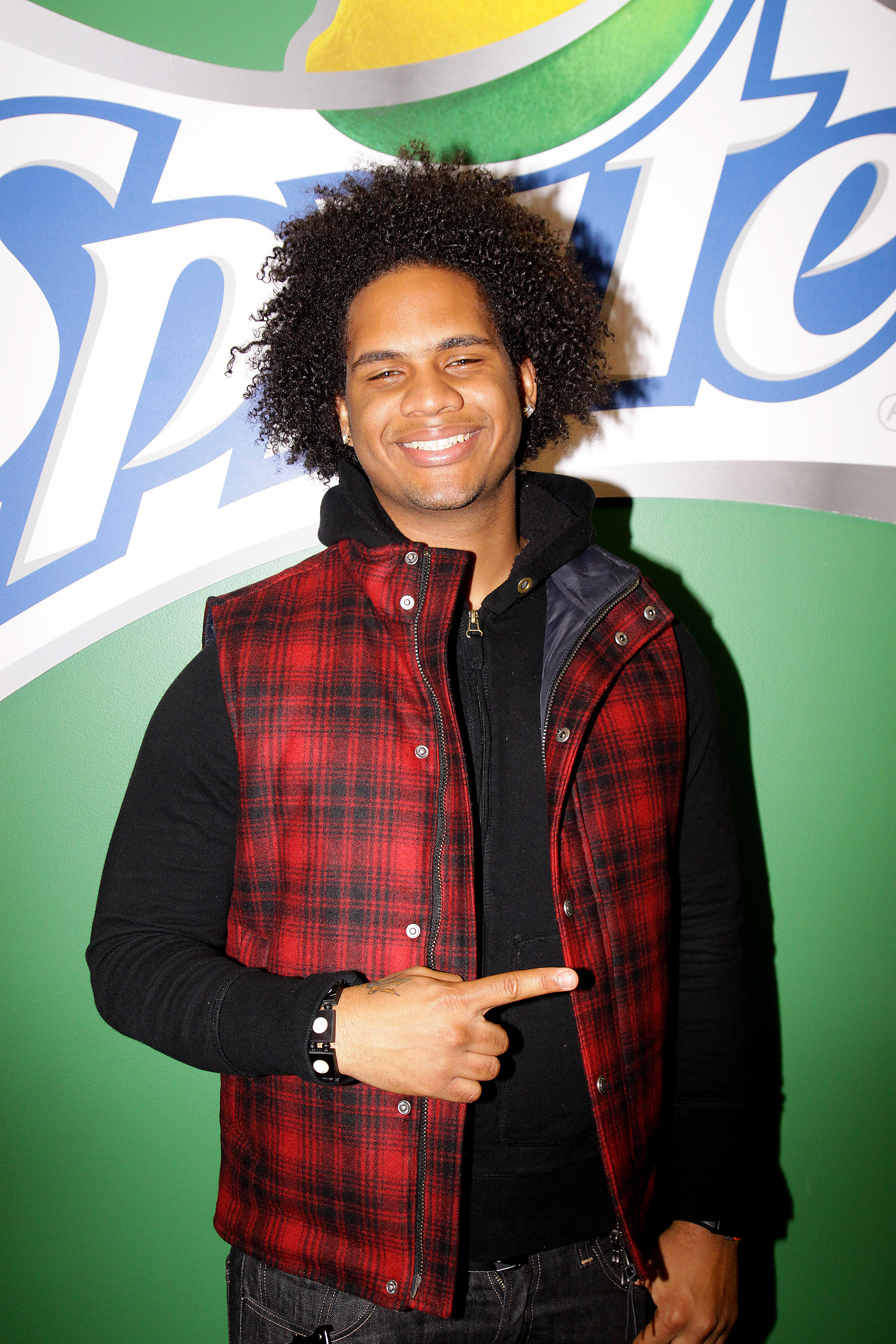
- Jaicko poses at KISS-FM "Coca-Cola Lounge" in Chicago, 2010 (photo by Raymond Boyd)

Background information
- Birth name: Jaicko Raphael Lawrence
- Born: 6 August 1991 (age 33)
- Origin: Barbados
- Genres: Contemporary R&B, pop
- Occupation: Singer-songwriter
- Years active: 2004–present
- Labels: Capitol Records (2008–present)
- Website: https://www.kingmindedmusicgroup.com/jaickolawrence

Jaicko Raphael Lawrence is a Bajan contemporary pop music singer-songwriter signed to Capitol Records. Born Jaicko Lawrence on 6 August 1991 in Christ Church, Barbados, Jaicko has been nominated for six Barbados Music Awards, including Best Pop Single, Pop/R&B Artist of the Year, Songwriter of the Year, and Album of the Year in 2008. His debut single was called "Oh Yeah", produced by the Stereotypes, and reached #2 on the Bubbling Under R&B/Hip-Hop Singles. It was written by Lil Eddie, Tiwa Savage and Kamaria Ousley. The remix version featuring Snoop Dogg reached #77 on the Canadian Hot 100.

Jaicko's forthcoming debut album is titled Can I. Jaicko wrote and produced several songs on the album, and collaborated with the production team Stargate and Jim Jonsin on the project. Jaicko's 2010 single "FFWD" was featured on the compilation NOW 33.

Prior to signing with Capitol Records, Jaicko released a rap solo album independently in Barbados in November 2006, selling 6,000 copies without major distribution.

== Discography ==
=== Charted singles ===
Title	Year	Peak chart positions				Album
Title	Year	GER	AUT	SWI	US	Album
"Oh Yeah!"	2010	—	—	—	96	Can I
"Remember to Forget" (with Carlprit)	2014	46	64	61	—	Single only

=== Other releases ===
- 2010: "Fast Forward"
- 2013: "Perfect Love"
- 2014: "More Than Enough" (with Marc Korn)
- 2014: "Love Come Down" (with Bodybangers & TomE)
- 2014: "Only Gets Better" (with Carlprit)
- 2014: "Shine" (with Blade Deep & DJ Fale)
