= This Is Nightlife =

Single by ItaloBrothers
- Released: March 15, 2013
- Recorded: 2013
- Genre: Dance, house, Eurodance
- Length: 2:42
- Label: Zooland Records, Kontor Records
- Songwriter(s): Christian Sandberg, Mathias Metten, Zacharias Adrian, Sash!
- Producer(s): ItaloBrothers

ItaloBrothers singles chronology
"My Life Is a Party" (2012)	"This Is Nightlife" (2013)	"Luminous Intensity" (2013)

"This Is Nightlife" is a song by German dance group ItaloBrothers. The song was released in Germany as a download on March 15, 2013. It reached the top 30 charts of Austria and Switzerland and the top 50 in Germany. The song interpolates the 1997 Sash! hit "Ecuador".

== Music video ==
The music video for the single was released on YouTube on March 13, 2013 at a total length of two minutes and forty-nine seconds, and was filmed in Frankfurt. It quickly received 700,000 views within the first two weeks.

== Track listing ==
Digital download

1. "This Is Nightlife" (video edit) - 2:42
2. "This Is Nightlife" (DJ Gollum radio edit) - 3:17
3. "This Is Nightlife" (Cody radio edit) - 3:16
4. "This Is Nightlife" (extended mix) - 3:58
5. "This Is Nightlife" (DJ Gollum remix) - 5:03
6. "This Is Nightlife" (Cody remix) - 5:11

== Chart performance ==
=== Weekly charts ===
Chart (2013)	Peak position
Austria (Ö3 Austria Top 40)	26
Belgium (Ultratop 50 Wallonia)	25
Denmark (Tracklisten)	32
Finland (Suomen virallinen lista)	13
France (SNEP)	24
Germany (GfK)	41
Switzerland (Schweizer Hitparade)	22

=== Year-end charts ===
Chart (2013)	Position
France (SNEP)	94

== Certifications ==
Region	Certification	Certified units/sales
Streaming
Denmark (IFPI Danmark)	Platinum	1,800,000^{†}
^{†} Streaming-only figures based on certification alone.

== Release history ==
Region	Date	Format	Label
Germany	March 15, 2013	Download	Kontor Records, Zoo Digital
Germany	March 15, 2013	Download (Remixes EP)	Kontor Records, Zoo Digital
Austria	March 15, 2013	Download (Remixes EP)	Kontor Records, Zoo Digital
Switzerland	March 15, 2013	Download (Remixes EP)	Kontor Records, Zoo Digital
France	March 22, 2013	Download	Happy Music
Denmark	April 8, 2013	Download (Remixes EP)	disco:wax
Finland	April 8, 2013	Download (Remixes EP)	disco:wax
Norway	April 8, 2013	Download (Remixes EP)	disco:wax
Sweden	April 8, 2013	Download (Remixes EP)	disco:wax
