= That Girl (Mischa Daniels song) =

Single by Mischa Daniels featuring U-Jean
- Released: June 11, 2012
- Recorded: 2012
- Genre: Dance
- Length: 2:50
- Label: Armada Music
- Songwriters: Jenson Vaughan and another

Mischa Daniels singles chronology
"Famous Fame 004" (2012)	"That Girl" (2012)	"Famous Fame 003" (2012)

U-Jean singles chronology
"Animal" (2011)	"That Girl" (2012)	"Summer Jam" (2012)

"That Girl" is a song by Dutch Euro-House, Dance and pop singer Mischa Daniels, featuring vocals from Pop, R&B and Hip-Hop singer U-Jean. The song was released in the Netherlands as a digital download on June 11, 2012. The song has peaked to number 95 on the German Singles Chart.

== Music video ==
A music video to accompany the release of "That Girl" was first released onto YouTube on June 12, 2012 at a total length of three minutes and five seconds.

== Track listing ==
Digital download

1. "That Girl" (Radio Edit) – 2:50
2. "That Girl" (Solid Gaz Radio Edit) – 4:02
3. "That Girl" (Extended Mix) – 4:21
4. "That Girl" (Solid Gaz Remix) – 6:03

== Chart performance ==
Chart (2012)	Peak position
Germany (GfK)	95

== Release history ==
Region	Date	Format	Label
Netherlands	June 11, 2012	Digital Download	Armada Music
