= Megamix (R.I.O. song) =

Single by R.I.O.

from the album Ready or Not
- Released: 2 August 2013
- Recorded: 2013
- Genre: Dance
- Length: 8:21
- Label: Kontor Records
- Songwriter(s): Toni Cottura, Stephan Browarczyk, Shahin Moshirian, Yann Peifer, Christoph Brüx, Vick Krishna, Craig Smart, Manuel Reuter, Andres Ballinas, Michael Bein, R. Bibow

R.I.O. singles chronology
"Ready or Not" (2013)	"Megamix" (2013)	"Komodo (Hard Nights)" (2013)

"Megamix" is a song by German dance band R.I.O. The song was released in Germany as a digital download in August 2013. The song has charted in Austria and Germany, peaking to number 19. The song was written by Toni Cottura, Stephan Browarczyk, Shahin Moshirian, Yann Peifer, Christoph Brüx, Vick Krishna, Craig Smart, Manuel Reuter, Andres Ballinas, Michael Bein and R. Bibow.

== Music video ==
A music video to accompany the release of "Megamix" was first released onto YouTube on 2 August 2013 at a total length of eight minutes and twenty-two seconds.

== Track listing ==
Digital download
No.	Title	Length
1.	"Megamix"	8:16

== Chart performance ==
=== Weekly charts ===
Chart (2013)	Peak position
Austria (Ö3 Austria Top 40)	19
Germany (GfK)	19

== Release history ==
Region	Date	Format	Label
Germany	2 August 2013	Digital Download	Kontor Records
