= Komodo (Hard Nights) =

Single by R.I.O. featuring U-Jean
- Released: 27 September 2013
- Recorded: 2013
- Genre: Dance
- Length: 3:17
- Label: Kontor Records
- Songwriter(s): Gianfranco Bortolotti, Mauro Picotto, Andrea Remondini, Riccardo Ferri

R.I.O. singles chronology
"Megamix" (2013)	"Komodo (Hard Nights)" (2013)	"One in a Million" (2014)

U-Jean singles chronology
"Ready or Not" (2013)	"Komodo (Hard Nights)" (2013)	"One in a Million" (2014)

"Komodo (Hard Nights)" is a song by German dance band R.I.O., featuring vocals from Pop, R&B and Hip-Hop singer U-Jean. The song was released in Germany as a digital download on 27 September 2013. The song has charted in Austria, Germany and Switzerland. The song was written by Gianfranco Bortolotti, Mauro Picotto, Andrea Remondini and Riccardo Ferri.

== Content ==
The song samples Italian trance producer Mauro Picotto's song, "Komodo (Save a Soul)".

== Music video ==
A music video to accompany the release of "Komodo (Hard Nights)" was first released onto YouTube on 27 September 2013 at a total length of three minutes and twenty-six seconds.

== Track listing ==
Digital download
No.	Title	Length
1.	"Komodo (Hard Nights)" (Radio Edit) (feat. U-Jean)	3:17
2.	"Komodo (Hard Nights)" (Video Edit) (feat. U-Jean)	3:31
3.	"Komodo (Hard Nights)" (Extended Mix) (feat. U-Jean)	5:03
4.	"Komodo (Hard Nights)" (Crew Cardinal Radio Edit) (feat. U-Jean)	3:03
5.	"Komodo (Hard Nights)" (Crew Cardinal Remix) (feat. U-Jean)	4:30

== Chart performance ==
=== Weekly charts ===
Chart (2013)	Peak position
Austria (Ö3 Austria Top 40)	45
Germany (GfK)	58
Switzerland (Schweizer Hitparade)	45

== Release history ==
Region	Date	Format	Label
Germany	27 September 2013	Digital Download	Kontor Records
