= Liz Kay =

- Born: Eliza Krul; 1981 (age 44–45); Delft, Netherlands
- Genres: Eurodance; Euro-trance
- Occupation: Singer
- Instrument: Vocals

Eliza Krul (born 1981 in Delft), known professionally as Liz Kay, is a Dutch Eurodance singer and social media marketeer.

== Biography ==
Kay has worked with various DJ's in recording studios, including Yanou

Kay commented:

"We did a song to see if we are a good team. I was very excited, because I know that Yanou is a major producer. It felt so natural and we were very happy with the results, so we never stopped working together. Manian is also an important part of the team. I am very proud and grateful to work with both of them!"

In 2007, the eurodance-single "When Love Becomes a Lie" was released, followed by "Castles in the Sky", which was originally released by Ian Van Dahl.

== Discography ==
Singles

- 2006: "King of My Castle" (with Yanou))
- 2007: "When Love Becomes a Lie"
- 2007: "You're Not Alone" (Olive cover)
- 2007: "Castles in the Sky" (Ian Van Dahl cover)
- 2008: "True Faith" (New Order cover)
- 2008: "To France 2008" (Mike Oldfield & Maggie Reilly cover)
- 2009: "You're Not Alone 2009" (re-release from the 2007 single "You're Not Alone")
- 2010: "To the Moon and Back"

Collaborations

- 2010: Something About You (with R.I.O.)
- 2010: Watching You (with R.I.O.)
