= Stamp on the Ground =

Single by ItaloBrothers

from the album Stamp!
- Released: September 25, 2009
- Genre: Dance; jumpstyle
- Length: 3:16
- Label: Zooland Records, All Around the World
- Songwriters: Nachtverbindung, Zacharias Adrian
- Producer: ItaloBrothers

ItaloBrothers singles chronology
"Where Are You Now?" (2008)	"Stamp on the Ground" (2009)	"So Small" (2009)

"Stamp on the Ground" is a song by German dance group ItaloBrothers. The song was released in Germany as a digital download on September 25, 2009. The song has charted in Denmark, Norway and Sweden.

== Music video ==
A music video to accompany the release of "Stamp on the Ground" was first released onto YouTube on June 14, 2009 at a total length of three minutes and thirty-three seconds. It is having over 207 million views as of November 2026.

== Track listing ==
Digital download

1. "Stamp on the Ground" (Radio Edit) - 3:16
2. "Stamp on the Ground" (Caramba Traxx Radio Edit) - 3:45
3. "Stamp on the Ground" (Megastylez Radio Edit) - 3:34
4. "Stamp on the Ground" (Max Farenthide Radio Edit) - 3:41
5. "Stamp on the Ground" (Extended Mix) - 5:04
6. "Stamp on the Ground" (Caramba Traxx Remix) - 5:56
7. "Stamp on the Ground" (Megastylez Remix) - 5:09
8. "Stamp on the Ground" (Max Farenthide Remix) - 6:22

== Chart performance ==
Chart (2010)	Peak position
Austrian Dance Charts	15
Denmark (Tracklisten)	14
Norway (VG-lista)	11
Sweden (Sverigetopplistan)	53
Swiss Dance Charts	62

== Certifications ==
Region	Certification	Certified units/sales
Denmark (IFPI Danmark)	3× Platinum	270,000^{‡}
Norway (IFPI Norway)	Platinum	60,000^{‡}
Streaming
Denmark (IFPI Danmark)	Gold	900,000^{†}
Sweden (GLF)	2× Platinum	16,000,000^{†}
^{‡} Sales+streaming figures based on certification alone.^{†} Streaming-only figures based on certification alone.

== Release history ==
Region	Date	Format	Label
Germany	September 25, 2009	Digital Download	Zooland Records
Austria	September 25, 2009	Digital Download	Zooland Records
Switzerland	September 25, 2009	Digital Download	Zooland Records
France	September 25, 2009	Digital Download	Zooland Records
Denmark	June 15, 2010	Digital Download	disco:wax
Finland	June 15, 2010	Digital Download	disco:wax
Norway	June 15, 2010	Digital Download	disco:wax
Sweden	June 15, 2010	Digital Download	disco:wax
