= ItaloBrothers =

German dance project

- Origin: Nordhorn, Germany
- Genres: Italo dance; techno; hands up; EDM; Eurodance; jumpstyle (2005–2015) tropical house; deep house (2016–2021) slap house (2020-2022) hardstyle (2022-present)
- Years active: 2005–present
- Labels: Zooland; Kontor; Ultra; SME
- Members: Mathias Metten Klyve; Kristian Sandberg; Hanno Lohse; Dietmar Pollmann Jasper Iske; Daniel Terwolbeck
- Past members: Zacharias Adrian
- Website: italobrothersmusic.com

ItaloBrothers is a German dance project from Nordhorn, Germany. The group consists of vocalist Mathias Metten (former member of YouTube music group, 2busk), who works in the studio with Zacharias Adrian (also known as Zac McCrack) and Christian Müller (also known as Kristian Sandberg). As of 2022, there are four members; Mathias Metten, Kristian Sandberg, Hanno Lohse (formerly Cansis), and Dietmar Pollmann. They are most successful in Scandinavia and Central Europe, but also have gone on tour in Eastern Europe. They release all their songs on Zooland Records. Their most successful singles to date include: "Stamp on the Ground", "My Life Is a Party", "This Is Nightlife" and "Summer Air". Their latest track as of April 2023 is “Live 4 Ever” with Neptunica.

In January 2025, the ItaloBrothers team welcomed two new members. Jasper Iske, best known from the DJ duo FrenchSisters, and Daniel Terwolbeck, a Hamburg-based content producer, are now part of the expanding team.

== Music style ==
The general musical style of ItaloBrothers (except "My Life Is a Party" and "This Is Nightlife") is comparable with dance bands or artists, mostly from Italy, like Bloom 06, Prezioso, Floorfilla, Gigi D'Agostino, Gabry Ponte or some releases of DJ Manian and has influences of Italo dance, hands up and jumpstyle. They were also compared to Scooter.

In contrast to this, the music style of their singles "Cryin' In The Rain", "My Life Is a Party" and "This Is Nightlife" is mostly influenced by commercial European dance music like house and electro. This style can be compared to artists like R.I.O., 2010s releases of Manian and Cascada, and Mike Candys.

== Musical career ==
=== 2005–08: Musical beginnings ===
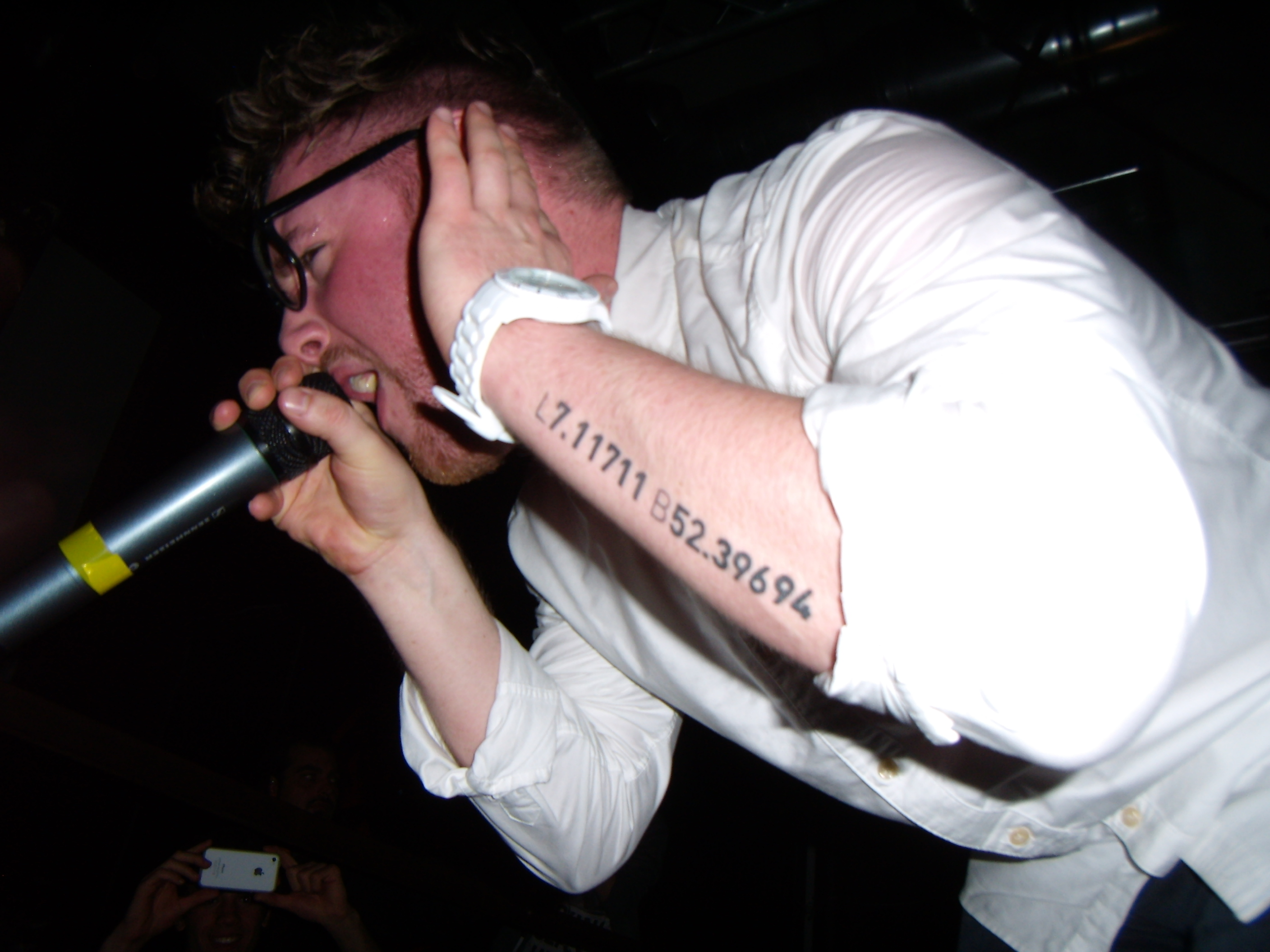
Matthias Metten from ItaloBrothers live in Italy at Reggio nell'Emilia (March 2012). The tattoo on his arm contains the geographical coordinates of the house where he has grown up near the German town Nordhorn.

The band was founded in November 2005, the three band members having already made music together since 2003. Their first official release was "The Moon", an italo-dance track released in July 2006 on an EP by their label Zooland called Zooland Italo EP. In 2007, they gained growing popularity with the release of "Moonlight Shadow", a cover version of the 1980 release of the same name by Mike Oldfield and a cooperation with German dance group Tune Up! called "Colours of the Rainbow". In 2006 and 2007, they also released various remixes of songs by other musicians for which they re-recorded the vocals and published them as "Italobrothers New Voc Rmx". Sometime in 2008, they released a cover of (I Just) Died In Your Arms by Cutting Crew and Learning To Fly by Tom Petty and the Heartbreakers, but those two songs were never released onto streaming services or CDs. Their next two releases, "Counting Down the Days" and "Where Are You Now?", established a fanbase throughout Europe.

=== 2009–2010: Commercial success in Scandinavia ===
A new single, "So Small", which is a cover of the Carrie Underwood song of the same name, was published in November 2009. It is the only single that was directly available on CD. Another release, the digital Love is on Fire EP, was released in March 2010.

The song "Stamp on the Ground", which was originally released in September 2009, was selected as official song for the Norwegian Russefeiring event 2010. The song was therefore re-released in Scandinavia and became a huge success, reaching the Top 20 in Norway and Denmark. The song also gained a chart position in Sweden and in the dance charts of Switzerland and Austria. The song was certified gold for 15,000 sold units in Denmark.

Following the success of "Stamp on the Ground", an album called Stamp! was released in December 2010 which contains all to this point released singles and five new tracks. One of this tracks with the title "Upside Down" was said to be a copy of the Russian singer Reda's track "Ja budu s Taboj". Her label DaTa Music took proceedings against the further release of the track, but the end of this lawsuit is unknown.

A follow-up single called "Radio Hardcore" was released in December 2010 and was able to recreate the success of "Stamp on the Ground" in Denmark.

=== 2011–12: Change of music style and commercial success in Central Europe ===
In May 2011, a track named "Cryin' in the Rain" was published, that differs very much from the common music style as it is a ballad with House elements. However, there was also released an "IB HandsUp! Remix" featuring the common style. This release was seen as an experiment. For their next release, "Boom", they worked together with the rapper Carlprit. This track is again in their old style, but features dubstep parts while Carlprit is rapping.

For the second time ItaloBrothers have produced the official Russ anthem, this time called "Pandora 2012" which was released on 13 April 2012.

=== 2012–2014: "My Life Is a Party" and singles ===
On 27 July 2012 the band released a single called "My Life Is a Party" which is a cover of the track "Dragostea din tei" by O-Zone from 2004. The radio edit of the song is still in typical ItaloBrothers style but the video features a remix by German dance band R.I.O., and was released on Kontor Records thus gaining a huge amount on YouTube views. The song entered the Top 20 in Austria, and managed to reach the first chart positions for the band in their home country, Germany, and in Switzerland, too. The song also charted in France and Belgium.

Another track named "This Is Nightlife", which contains elements of the song "Ecuador" by Sash! from 1997, was uploaded to YouTube on 13 March 2013 and was released as single two days later. The band changed their music style similar to the style of the video remix of their last single because it was much more successful than their old style. The song was able to recreate the success of the last single in Germany and Austria and additionally entered the Top 30 in Switzerland.

The band announced that they again produced a song for a Norwegian Russefeiring event, this time called "Luminous Intensity" which was officially released on 19 April 2013.

Italobrothers released the single "Up 'N Away" on 28 March 2014. On 28 November 2014, then they released another single "P.O.D." (People of DreamHack). Also, the single "Let's Go" Feat. P. Moody was released in December 2014.

=== 2015-2017: "One Heart", "Summer Air" and singles ===
In January 2015 the single "One Heart" was released, ItaloBrothers worked with Floorfilla as well as rapper P. Moody for the track. The song embodies their first placement in the French single charts. After the song was released, Zacharias Adrian would leave ItaloBrothers and Hanno Lohse (aka. Cody Island) would soon join. April 2015 saw the release of "Springfield" with the ItaloBrothers working alongside Norwegian DJ Martin Tungevaag to produce the song. The track reached major success in Norway. In May 2015 the single "Welcome To The Dancefloor" was released. The single is a cover of "Rhythm Is a Dancer" by German eurodance band Snap! from the years 1992. They returned to their hands-up style with the song "Sleep When We're Dead", which was released in August 2015. In November 2015 a collaboration track with Danish singer Amalie Sølberg was published, called "Kings & Queens". With their track "Generation Party", released in July 2016 they released a song in a similar style as "Springfield". Later in summer 2016 the ItaloBrothers released the single "Summer Air", which became their biggest hit single yet. After a re-release in early 2017 the tropical-house/future-bass track reached high success in several Scandinavian countries as well as in Central Europe. In Norway they jumped on number 2.

=== 2018–2019: "Looking Back Someday" and further singles ===
In 2018, Italobrothers released three singles within the year, the first being "Looking Back Someday" then "Inside Out" and finally "Till You Drop". On April 13, 2019, they released “Games”. On July 5, 2019, they released Ocean Breeze. Most of these songs around this time were produced by either Cody Island or The Ping Ping Dudes.

=== 2020–present: “Let Go”, “Down For The Ride”, and signing to Virgin Records ===
In 2020, ItaloBrothers released their first single to Virgin Records with Kiesza called “Let Go”. It was disclosed by Mathias in an interview with Lennon Cihak in the “When Life Hands You Lennons” podcast that releases stopped due to having to sign to Virgin Records and leaving Zooland.

ItaloBrothers released “Stay” in December 2020. In April 2021, they released “Down For The Ride,” which became their most streamed track as part of Virgin Records. They released “Daydream” in August 2021 which includes vocals from songwriter Charlott Boss. In November 2021, they released “One Day” that was partially written by Séb Mont, who has also collaborated with ItaloBrothers producer Hanno Lohse.

2022 saw the release of “Mission 1” which was a single that contained songs like “Young At Heart,” “Dive Deep,” and “Best Mistake.” In July 2022 came the release of “Summer” and in August 2022, they released a remix of The BossHoss’ song “Dance The Boogie,” which was highly anticipated by The BossHoss on YouTube as their first EDM song, with Mathias being featured in a video.

The Hardstyle community got a taste of the ItaloBrothers music after ItaloBrothers collaborated with Hardstyle band Harris & Ford on “Weekend Party”. The song was released on October 21, 2022. The song was leaked on YouTube a day before its debut release, but it is unknown as to how it was leaked.

=== Miscellaneous appearances ===
Mathias Metten was featured in YouTube musical duo 2busk. The channel that 2busk was hosted on is currently inactive.

Kristian Sandberg worked with duo Rob & Chris on songs such as “Durchgemacht” and “Mond,” providing vocals for those songs. He went under the stage name Sandberg. He was also featured in some songs with the band Leuchtturm where he also provided vocals. He went under a different alias by the name Kristian König. His latest vocal appearance was on KYANU’s song “Sleepwalking”, though, he is not a credited artist.

Hanno Lohse went under the name Cansis for a few years, releasing the song called “Trip To Paradise” alongside Spaceship. He now goes under the name Hanno and has collaborated with Séb Mont on a few different occasions.

Dietmar Pollmann has helped write songs for Cody Island as well as for KYANU and Helene Fischer.

== Discography ==
=== Albums ===
- Stamp! (2010)

=== Singles ===
Title	Year	Peak chart positions									Certifications	Album
Title	Year	GER	AUT	BEL (Wa)	DEN	FIN	FRA	NOR	SWE	SWI	Certifications	Album
"Colours of the Rainbow" (with Tune Up!)	2006	—	—	—	—	—	—	—	—	—		Stamp!
"Stamp on the Ground"	2009	—	—	—	14	—	—	11	53	—	GLF: 2× Platinum; IFPI DEN: 3× Platinum; IFPI NOR: Platinum	Stamp!
"Love Is On Fire"	2010	—	—	—	—	—	—	—	—	—		Stamp!
"Radio Hardcore"	2010	—	—	—	29	—	—	—	—	—	IFPI DEN: Gold	Stamp!
"Cryin' in the Rain"	2011	—	—	—	—	—	—	—	—	—		Non-album singles
"Boom" (featuring Carlprit)	2011	—	—	—	—	—	—	—	—	—	IFPI DEN: Gold	Non-album singles
"Pandora 2012"	2012	—	—	—	—	—	—	—	—	—		Non-album singles
"My Life Is a Party"	2012	43	18	84 (Note: The song "My Life Is a Party" did not enter the Ultratop 50, but peaked at number 34 on the Ultratip chart.)	—	—	103	—	—	62	IFPI DEN: Platinum	Non-album singles
"This Is Nightlife"	2013	41	26	25	32	16	24	—	—	22	IFPI DEN: Platinum	Non-album singles
"Up 'N Away"	2014	—	64	—	—	—	—	—	—	—		Non-album singles
"P.O.D."	2014	—	—	—	—	—	—	—	—	—		Non-album singles
"Let's Go" (featuring P. Moody) with Cody Island	2014	—	—	—	—	—	—	—	—	—		Non-album singles
"One Heart" (with Floorfilla featuring P. Moody)	2015	—	—	69 (Note: The song "One Heart" did not enter the Ultratop 50, but peaked at number 19 on the Ultratip chart.)	—	—	57	—	—	—		Non-album singles
"Springfield" (with Martin Tungevaag)	2015	—	—	—	—	3	—	22	51	—	IFPI NOR: 3× Platinum	Non-album singles
"Welcome to the Dancefloor"	2015	—	—	58 (Note: The song "Welcome to the Dancefloor" did not enter the Ultratop 50, but peaked at number 8 on the Ultratip chart.)	—	—	65	—	—	—		Non-album singles
"Sleep When We're Dead"	2015	—	—	—	—	—	—	—	—	—	IFPI DEN: Gold	Non-album singles
"Kings & Queens"	2015	—	—	—	—	—	—	—	—	—		Non-album singles
"Generation Party"	2016	—	—	—	—	—	—	—	—	—		Non-album singles
"Summer Air"	2016	34	14	67 (Note: The song "Summer Air" did not enter the Ultratop 50, but peaked at number 17 on the Ultratip chart.)	14	6	—	2	10	36	BVMI: Platinum; GLF: 3× Platinum; IFPI AUT: Gold; IFPI DEN: 2× Platinum; IFPI NOR: 3× Platinum; IFPI SWI: Gold; MC: Gold	Non-album singles
"Hasselhoff 2017"	2017	—	—	—	—	—	—	—	—	—		Non-album singles
"Fiction Squad"	2017	—	—	—	—	—	—	—	—	—		Non-album singles
"Sorry"	2017	—	—	—	—	—	—	—	—	—		Non-album singles
"Looking Back Someday"	2018	—	—	—	—	—	—	—	—	—		Non-album singles
"Inside Out"	2018	—	—	—	—	—	—	—	—	—		Non-album singles
"Till You Drop"	2018	—	—	—	—	—	—	—	—	—		Non-album singles
"Games"	2019	—	—	—	—	—	—	—	—	—		Non-album singles
"Ocean Breeze"	2019	—	—	—	—	—	—	—	— (Note: "Ocean Breeze" did not enter the Swedish Singellista Chart, but peaked at number 12 on the Swedish Heatseeker Chart.)	—		Non-album singles
"Let Go" (featuring Kiesza)	2020	—	—	—	—	—	—	—	—	—		Non-album singles
"Stay"	2020	—	—	—	—	—	—	—	—	—		Non-album singles
"Down For The Ride"	2021	—	—	—	—	—	—	—	—	—		Non-album singles
"Sing It Back Again" (with LIZOT)	2021	—	—	—	—	—	—	—	—	—		Non-album singles
"Daydream" (with Charlott Boss)	2021	—	—	—	—	—	—	—	—	—		Non-album singles
"Dive Deep"	2022	—	—	—	—	—	—	—	—	—		Non-album singles
"Young at Heart" (with Frances)	2022	—	—	—	—	—	—	—	— (Note: "Ocean Breeze" did not enter the Swedish Singellista Chart, but peaked at number 12 on the Swedish Heatseeker Chart.)	—		Non-album singles
"—" denotes items which were not released in that country or failed to chart.

=== Remixes ===
- The BossHoss - Dance The Boogie (ItaloBrothers Remix) (2022)
- Axel Black & White - Somebody To Love (ItaloBrothers Remix) (2021)
- Young London - Let Me Go (ItaloBrothers Radio Edit) (2013)
- Manian - Saturday Night (ItaloBrothers Radio Edit) (2013)
- Floorfilla - Italodancer (ItaloBrothers New Vocal Remix) (2007)
- Manian - Turn The Tide (ItaloBrothers New Voc Rmx) (2007)
- Dan Winter & Rob Mayth - Dare Me (ItaloBrothers New Voc Rmx) (2007)
- Manian feat. Aila - Heaven (ItaloBrothers New Voc Rmx) (2007)
- Cascada - Ready For Love (ItaloBrothers New Voc Rmx) (2006)
- Cerla vs. Manian - Jump (ItaloBrothers New Voc Rmx) (2006)

=== Production credits ===
Title (Note: Ordered music production to high school students for use in russ celebration promotion, showing student fraction.)	Fraction	Release year
"Pandora 2012"		2012
"Luminous Intensity 2013"		2013
"Hasselhoff 2017"	Nesbrurussen 2017	2017
"Fiction Squad"	Steinkjerrussen 2017	2017
