= Summer Jam (R.I.O. song) =

Single by R.I.O. featuring U-Jean

from the album Turn This Club Around (Deluxe Edition)
- Released: July 27, 2012
- Recorded: 2012
- Genre: Electro house
- Length: 3:02
- Label: Kontor Records

R.I.O. singles chronology
"Party Shaker" (2012)	"Summer Jam" (2012)	"Living in Stereo" (2013)

U-Jean singles chronology
"That Girl" (2012)	"Summer Jam" (2012)	"Flying" (2012)

"Summer Jam" is a song by German dance band R.I.O., featuring vocals from Pop, R&B and Hip-Hop singer U-Jean. The song was released in Germany as a digital download on July 27, 2012. It samples the chorus from The Underdog Project's "Summer Jam" (2001).

== Music video ==
A music video to accompany the release of "Summer Jam" was first released onto YouTube on July 27, 2012 at a total length of three minutes and eleven seconds.

== Track listing ==
Digital download

1. "Summer Jam" - 3:02
2. "Summer Jam" (Crew Cardinal Radio Edit) - 3:35
3. "Summer Jam" (Crew 7 Radio Edit) - 2:57
4. "Summer Jam" (Extended Mix) - 4:27
5. "Summer Jam" (Crew Cardinal Remix) - 5:48
6. "Summer Jam" (Crew 7 Remix) - 4:53

== Chart performance ==
Chart (2012)	Peak position
Austria (Ö3 Austria Top 40)	2
France (SNEP)	39
Germany (GfK)	7
Israel (Media Forest)	10
Slovakia (Rádio Top 100)	39
Switzerland (Schweizer Hitparade)	2

=== Year-end charts ===
Chart (2012)	Position
Austria (Ö3 Austria Top 40)	41
Germany (Media Control AG)	75
Switzerland (Schweizer Hitparade)	49

== Release history ==
Region	Date	Format	Label
Germany	July 27, 2012	Digital Download	Kontor Records
