= Party Shaker =

Single by R.I.O. featuring Nicco

from the album Turn This Club Around (Deluxe Edition)
- Released: 18 May 2012
- Recorded: 2011
- Genre: Electro house
- Length: 3:26
- Label: Kontor Records
- Songwriters: Andres Ballinas, Yann Peifer, Manuel Reuter

R.I.O. singles chronology
"Animal" (2011)	"Party Shaker" (2012)	"Summer Jam" (2012)

Nicco singles chronology
"Party Shaker" (2012)

Music video
- "Party Shaker" on YouTube

"Party Shaker" is a song by German dance-band R.I.O., featuring vocals from Nicco. It was released in Germany as a digital download on 18 May 2012. The song has charted in Austria, France, Netherlands and Switzerland. The track features a sample of Vengaboys 1999 hit "We Like to Party".

A music video to accompany the release of "Party Shaker" was first released onto YouTube on 15 May 2012 at a total length of three minutes and thirty-one seconds. It is Kontor Records' most viewed song on YouTube, having 247 million views.

== Chart performance ==
=== Weekly charts ===
Chart (2012)	Peak position
Austria (Ö3 Austria Top 40)	10
Belgium (Ultratip Bubbling Under Flanders)	36
Belgium (Ultratop 50 Wallonia)	28
Canada Hot 100 (Billboard)	62
Czech Republic Airplay (ČNS IFPI)	40
Finland (Suomen virallinen lista)	11
France (SNEP)	5
Germany (GfK)	10
Netherlands (Dutch Top 40)	20
Netherlands (Single Top 100)	29
Norway (VG-lista)	8
Poland (Polish Airplay New)	2
Poland Dance (ZPAV)	42
Switzerland (Schweizer Hitparade)	6

=== Year-end charts ===
Chart (2012)	Position
Austria (Ö3 Austria Top 40)	37
France (SNEP)	68
Germany (Official German Charts)	88
Netherlands (Dutch Top 40)	98
Switzerland (Schweizer Hitparade)	36

== Certifications ==
Region	Certification	Certified units/sales
Germany (BVMI)	Gold	150,000^{^}
Streaming
Denmark (IFPI Danmark)	Gold	900,000^{†}
^{^} Shipments figures based on certification alone.^{†} Streaming-only figures based on certification alone.

== Release history ==
Region	Date	Format	Label
Germany	18 May 2012	Digital Download	Kontor Records
