= U-Jean =

American singer

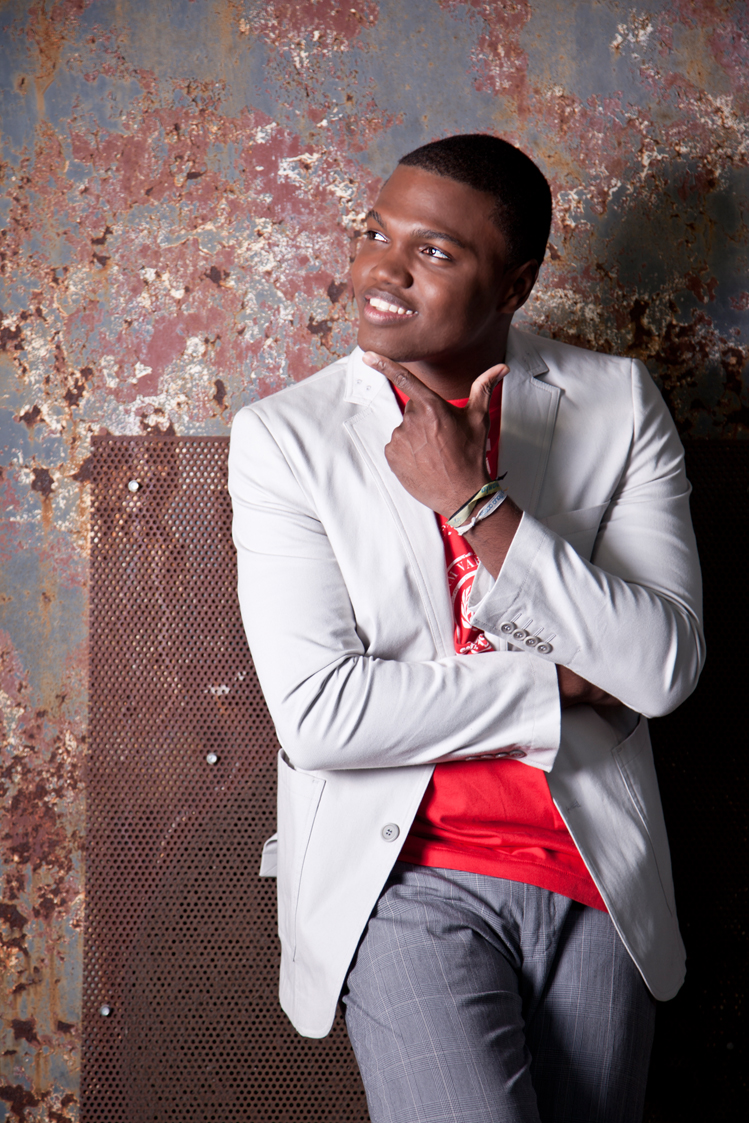

Background information
- Born: Alex Hutson; Cleveland, Ohio, U.S.
- Origin: Atlanta, Georgia, U.S.
- Genres: Dance-pop, R&B
- Years active: 2007–present
- Labels: Zooland, Kontor
- Website: u-jean.com

U-Jean, is an American singer and songwriter based in Germany. He performs pop, R&B, and hip-hop. He is best known for his collaboration with the German dance project R.I.O. on the songs "Turn This Club Around" and "Summer Jam". His debut single, a version of Belinda Carlisle's "Heaven Is a Place on Earth", was released in June 2011 and features vocals by Carlprit.

== Biography ==
Hutson was born in Cleveland, Ohio, and raised in Atlanta, Georgia. After completing his education, he moved to Germany as a soldier in the United States Army. While stationed there, he auditioned for the U.S. Army Europe Soldier Show in Schwetzingen.

After leaving the army, Hutson remained in Germany to pursue a music career. He performed as a member of the group Sweet Soul Music Revue and worked as a producer and songwriter. He also performed with the King Kamehameha Band in Frankfurt.

In 2009, he founded the production company Whazz Crackin. By 2010, the company had produced hip-hop and dance tracks for several artists. In 2012, U-Jean provided backing vocals on the Cascada album It's Christmas Time.

== Collaborations ==
In 2011, U-Jean met Yanou and DJ Manian of Zooland Records. He collaborated with their project R.I.O. on the tracks "Turn This Club Around", "Animal", and "Summer Jam". "Turn This Club Around" reached number three on the German charts and charted in Austria and Switzerland.

== Discography ==
=== Singles ===
==== As lead artist ====
Year	Single	Album
2011	"Heaven Is a Place on Earth" (featuring Carlprit)	Non-album singles
2012	"Flying" (Ilhama & U-Jean featuring DJ OGB)	Non-album singles

==== As featured artist ====
Year	Single	Peak chart positions						Album
Year	Single	GER	AUT	FRA	NL	SWI	UK	Album
2011	"Turn This Club Around" (R.I.O. featuring U-Jean)	3	5	96	43	1	36	Turn This Club Around
2011	"Animal" (R.I.O. featuring U-Jean)	48	33	—	52	51	—	Turn This Club Around
2012	"That Girl" (Mischa Daniels featuring U-Jean)	95	—	—	—	—	—	—N/a
2012	"Summer Jam" (R.I.O. featuring U-Jean)	7	2	39	—	2	—	Turn This Club Around (Deluxe Edition)
2013	"Ready or Not" (R.I.O. featuring U-Jean)	54	40	—	—	64	—	Ready or Not
2013	"Komodo (Hard Nights)" (R.I.O. featuring U-Jean)	58	45	—	—	45	—	—N/a
2014	"One in a Million" (R.I.O. featuring U-Jean)	51	62	—	—	62	—	—N/a
2015	"Paradise" (Mike Candys featuring U-Jean)	—	—	—	—	27	—	—N/a
"—" denotes a single that did not chart or was not released in that territory.

=== Guest appearances ===
Year	Single	Peak chart positions		Album
Year	Single	GER	AUT	Album
2013	"House Party" (DJ Antoine vs. Mad Mark featuring B-Case & U-Jean)	44	22	Sky Is the Limit
