= Like I Love You (R.I.O. song) =

Single by R.I.O.

from the album Sunshine
- Released: 28 January 2011
- Recorded: 2010
- Genre: Dance
- Length: 3:09
- Label: Spinnin Records
- Songwriter(s): Yann Peifer, Manuel Reuter, Andres Ballinas, Michael Bein
- Producer(s): Yann Peifer, Manuel Reuter

R.I.O. singles chronology
"Hot Girl" (2010)	"Like I Love You" (2011)	"Miss Sunshine" (2011)

"Like I Love You" is a song by German dance band R.I.O. The song was written by Yann Peifer, Manuel Reuter, Andres Ballinas and Michael Bein. It was released in the Netherlands as a digital download on 28 January 2011. The melody is based on "Like I Love You" by The Hitmen.

== Track listing ==
Digital download

1. "Like I Love You" (Radio Edit) – 3:09
2. "Like I Love You" (Video Edit) – 3:23
3. "Like I Love You" (Extended Mix) – 5:44
4. "Like I Love You" (Money G Remix) – 5:23
5. "Like I Love You" (Black Toys Remix) – 4:52

== Credits and personnel ==
- Lead vocals – Neal Antone Dyer
- Producers – Yann Peifer, Manuel Reuter
- Lyrics – Yann Peifer, Manuel Reuter, Andres Ballinas, Michael Bein
- Label: Spinnin Records

== Charts ==
Chart (2011)	Peak position
Austria (Ö3 Austria Top 40)	35
Germany (GfK)	31
Netherlands (Dutch Top 40)	24
Netherlands (Single Top 100)	29
Switzerland (Schweizer Hitparade)	28

== Release history ==
Region	Date	Format	Label
Netherlands	28 January 2011	Digital Download	Spinnin Records
