= Carlprit =

German-Zimbabwean rapper, songwriter DJ and music manager

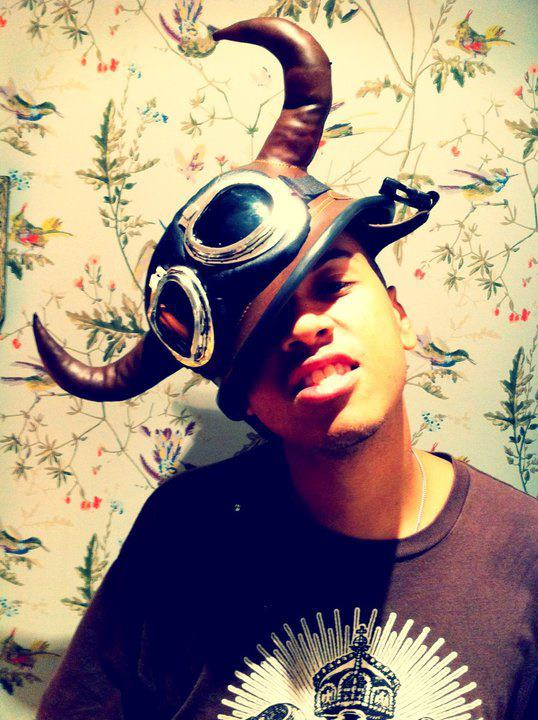
- Carlprit in London, 2012

Background information
- Born: Rudi Frank Harold Schwamborn; Harare, Zimbabwe
- Origin: Germany
- Genres: Pop rap; EDM; hip hop; Eurodance; electro hop; electropop
- Occupations: Rapper; songwriter; DJ; music manager

Rudi Frank Harold Schwamborn (German pronunciation: [ˈʁuːdiː ˈʃvamˌbɔʁn]; born in Avenues, Harare, Zimbabwe), professionally known as Carlprit, is a German-Zimbabwean rapper, songwriter, DJ and music manager. He has performed and written for acts such as Cascada, Alexandra Stan and Laurent Wolf. Schwamborn is best known for his song "Fiesta" as well as his appearance in Cascada's 2009 hit single "Evacuate the Dancefloor". The title sold over three million copies worldwide and reached the top 20 on Billboard charts, making Carlprit the first person of Zimbabwean origin to have a song on the top U.S. Billboard charts.

== Early life ==
Carlprit was born in Avenues, Harare, to a Zimbabwean mother and a German father. He grew up on Tom Ward Ave. by Cotswold Hills in Mabelreign, Harare. He attended North Park Primary School and Ellis Robins Boys High School before leaving Harare to live with one of his older brothers in Germany. The youngest of five siblings, Carlprit is the younger brother of rapper Metaphysics of Söhne Mannheims. At the age of 14 he moved to Germany with his brother Metaphysics where he first started releasing music.

== Music career ==
Carlprit first started releasing music after moving to Germany. He started off doing hip hop music but soon switched genre to EDM after being offered paying jobs for his vocal performances by German producers. He first gained recognition through his participation in the song "The Universe" by his brother Metaphysics. "The Universe" was released on August 25, 2003 on Metaphysics first studio album "Digitale Garten".

In 2006 he founded his own label with a friend, which later on was dissolved due to creative differences. He started releasing songs on YouTube, followed by a debut single called "What Up Girl" under the label Gandanga Music. The song was produced by DJ and producer KMX Musik, who also collaborated on songs such as "That's The Way I Am" or "All My Life".

"Evacuate the Dancefloor" (2009)
Evacuate the Dancefloor was Schwamborn's first performance with a major label

Carlprit's first major release was on the song "Evacuate the Dancefloor" by Cascada which topped charts internationally. The song went Platinum in the US, and reached number #1 in the UK and the Netherlands.

After that Carlprit began working with pop acts including Mike Candys, Michael Mind Project, Alexandra Stan, Laurent Wolf, Darius & Finlay, Shaun Baker, R.I.O., U-Jean, DJ Manian, Whigfield, Tony T., Yanou, Nicco, ItaloBrothers and Raffaella Fico.

=== First single ===
Carlprit's first official solo single "See You At The Top" features the UK brother duo Bkay and Kazz. The song was released independently on Gandanga Records and Pyramid Music and was featured on the hit German television show Model WG and reached first position in South Africa on Channel O's request show.

Zooland Records and Universal Records released Carlprit's second solo single, "1234". The video was directed by Dany Wild and featured Miss Victoria Kern as the female acting vocalist.

=== "Fiesta" smash hit and solo success ===
His third solo single, "Fiesta", is widely considered his most successful, reaching number one in the French air play charts, the top 100 in Germany, France and Switzerland's single sales charts and over 5 million YouTube views. Fiesta was produced by The Michael Mind Project and Markus Shultz and features vocals recorded and written by CVB. The single was signed mainly to Kontor Records (Germany), Scorpio Music (France) and Blanco y Negro Music (Spain) and it also has an exclusive version for NRG radio.

=== Present ===
Since then, Carlprit has toured around the world and continues to release music.

== Discography ==
=== Solo songs ===
Title	Year	Peak chart positions				Album
Title	Year	GER	AUT	SWI	FR	Album
Fiesta	2012	53	–	45	39	Non-Album Singles
Here We Go (Allez Allez)	2013	59	43	—	—	Non-Album Singles
Remember to Forget (feat. Jaicko)	2014	46	64	61	—	Non-Album Singles

=== Guest appearances ===
Title	Year	Peak chart positions						Album
Title	Year	GER	AUT	SWI	UK	US	FR	Album
Evacuate the Dancefloor (with Cascada)	2009	5	6	7	1	25	5	Evacuate the Dancefloor
One More Time (with Bodybangers & Linda Teodosiu)	2011	–	–	–	–	–	161	Non-Album Singles
Do What You Do (with Klaas)	2012	–	65	—	—	—	—	Non-Album Singles
Do It All Night 2k12 (with Darius & Finlay & Nicco)	2012	34	21	11	—	—	—	Summer Is Here
Club Go Mad (with Modana)	2012	–	43	–	–	–	–	Non-Album Singles
Don't Stop the Dancing (mit Manian)	2012	–	48	55	–	–	75	Hands Up Forever
Saturday Night 2013 (with Whigfield)	2013	83	—	—	—	—	—	Single only
Brand New Day (with Mike Candys & Evelyn)	2013	–	68	42	—	—	—	Smile Together...In the Mix

=== Albums ===
- "Club Bangers " (2023, Carlprit)
- "More Beats To Chill To This Summer " (2022, Carlprit)
- "Beats To Chill To This Summer " (2022, Carlprit)
- "True Stories" (2021, Carlprit)
- "Carlprit Best Of " (2021, Carlprit)
- "Hustlers Academy " (2008, Carlprit)
- "B-Clubed " (2004, Carlprit)

==== As lead artist ====
- "Would You Be" (2023, with King Khama)
- "No No" (2023, with Maxim Schunk)
- "Down Town" (2022, with Tony T)
- "Phonk Is My Religion" (2022, with Dirty Fangz)
- "Change My World" (2022, with Edwan & Bloodlyne)
- "Airplane Mode" (2022)
- "Zeemahta" (2022, with Dirty Fangz & Gonzo The Great)
- "All The Way" (2022, with Kindervater & Bloodlyne)
- "Billie Eilish" (2022, with Crystal Rock)
- "Some More" (2022, with Tony-T)
- "Niggers In Paris" (2022, with Mikis & Crystal Rock)
- "Never Be Lonely" (2022, with Relanium, Deen West)
- "Go Crazy" (2022, with Bloodlyne)
- "What Then" (2022, with Calvo & Steve Modana)
- "Go Harder" (2022, with Onary)
- "Ratchet" (2021, with Steve Modana)
- "Chibata" (2021, with Kazz Khalif & Simon Rossi)
- "Benzo" (2021, with Metaphysics)
- "Freaky" (2021, with Chief Capone)
- "Frisky" (2021, with Kazz Khalif & Bailey Browne)
- "Benzo" (2021)
- "Party Don't Stop" (2021, with Thom Colvin)
- "True Stories" (2021)
- "Doggy" (2021, Relanium & Deen West)
- "Diamonds" (2021, Limao & Nicco)
- "Club Banger RMX" (2021, produced by Edwan)
- "Turn This Party On" (2020, feat. Edwan & CVB)
- "Club Banger" (2019)
- "All Right" (2019)
- "Don't Walk Away" (2019, feat. Kazz A.K.A Mr Boomslang)
- "Your Body" (2019, feat. DJ Jackson & Kazz A.K.A Mr Boomslang)
- "Number One" (2019, feat. Yoxi)
- "Hello Darling" (2018, feat. Edwan & Kazz A.K.A Mr Boomslang)
- "My Kind Of Trouble" (2018, feat. Edwan & Kazz aka Mr Boomslang)
- "So Fresh" (2018)
- "Hold On" (2016)
- "Domino" (2015 feat. U-jean)
- "Only Gets better" (2014, feat. Jaicko)
- "Remember to forget" feat. Jaicko
- "Party Around the World" (2013, feat. CvB)
- "Allez Allez" (2013, feat. CvB)
- "Fiesta" (2013, feat. CvB)
- "1234" (2011, with R.I.O.)
- "See You At The Top" (2010 feat. B-Kay & Kazz)

==== Other collaborations ====
- "Until The Baseline Drops" (2023, Plastik Funk and Esox) Vocals only
- "Insomnia Rework" (2021, Mike Candys and Jack Holiday) Vocals only
- "Shots" (2021, Jakle feat. Carlprit)
- "Shadow Crimes Audio Trip RMX" (2020, Heidi Anne feat. Carlprit)
- "#Party" (2020, Plastik Funk, Relanium Deen West feat. Carlprit)
- "Shadow Crimes" (2020, Heidi Anne feat. Carlprit)
- "Besito" (2020, Tom Boxer feat. Carlprit)
- "Trouble" (2020, DJ Sanny & DJ Samuel Kimko feat. Carlprit)
- "Like the Wind" (2019, Max Grosseck feat. Tony-T & Carlprit)
- "Tanz" (2019, Gin Tely feat. Carlprit & D Ocean)
- "Boss Sh**" (2018, Corti & LaMedica Andry J feat. Carlprit)
- "light Up The Club" (2018, Relanium & Deen West feat. Carlprit)
- "I Want Her" (2017, DJ Seip & Carlprit)
- "Yolo" (2015, Modana & Carlprit)
- "Get Gone" (2014, Luca Dayz feat. Carlprit)
- "Brand New Day" (2013, Mike Candys feat. Carlprit)
- "Biggest Fan" (2013, Modana & Carlprit)
- "Saturday Night" (2013, Whigfield feat. Carlprit)
- "Don't Stop The Dancing" (2012, DJ Manian feat. Carlprit)
- "Do It All Night" (2012, Darius and Finlay feat. Carlprit)
- "Club Go Mad" (2012, Modana & Carlprit)
- "Hotspot" (2012, Modana & Carlprit)
- "Party Crash" (2012, Modana & Carlprit)
- "Freak Around" (2012, Dirty Dubs feat. Carlprit)
- "The Night" (2012, HouseTwins feat. Carlprit & Lio)
- "Only Just Begun" (2012, Dimaro feat. Rosette and Carlprit)
- "Elevator" (2012, Irresistible feat. Carlprit)
- "Ready for Tonight" (2012, Dimaro feat. Rosette and Carlprit)
- "Do what you do" (2012, Klass feat. Carlprit)
- "Love Music" (2012, Shaun Baker feat. Carlprit)
- "1.000.000" (2012, with Alexandra Stan)
- "Don't Stop The Music" (2012, Love Unit feat. Carlprit)
- "Boom" (2011, ItaloBrothers feat. Carlprit)
- "One More Time" (2011, Body Banger's feat. Carlprit & Linda Teodosiu)
- "Second Beat Is Mine" (Sasha Dith, Daagard & Morane feat. Carlprit)
- "Party On" (2011, Funkybootz feat. Carlprit)
- "Heaven Is a Place" (2011, U-Jean feat. Carlprit)
- "Shake That Boo Boo" (2011, Modana & Carlprit)
- "Flip Flops and Hightops" (2011, Dear Zim feat. Carlprit)
- "Independence Day" (2011, Cascada & Carlprit)
- "Unspoken" (2011, Cascada & Carlprit)
- "Dance with Me" (2011, BRYCE feat. Carlprit)
- "We Are Here" (2011, Laurent Wolf feat. Carlprit and Mr Lio & Laurent Pepper)
- "Delirious" (2010, Michael Mind Project feat. Carlprit and Mandy Ventrice)
- "Ghetto Superstar" (2010, Basslovers feat. Carlprit)
- "LOVEBEAT" (2010, Amari feat. Carlprit)
- "How Do You Sleep" (2010, Angle City feat. Carlprit)
- "Boys Boys Boys" (2010, TWiiNS feat. Carlprit)
- "Ya Odna" (2010, Blue Affair & Sasha Dith feat. Carlprit)
- "Digi Ben" (2010, Mondotek feat. Carlprit)
- "Evacuate The Dancefloor " (2009, Cascada feat. Carlprit)
