= Nicco =

American recording artist (born 1977)

- Born: Niccolo Cruz DeFelice; August 7, 1977 (age 49); Queens, New York City
- Genres: Rock metal
- Instrument: Guitar

Nick Constantine Maniatty (born August 7, 1977), known by his mononym Nicco, is an American recording artist with pop, Europop, dance, reggae, house and electronic influences. He was signed to Sony in April 2011 and released his debut single "Downpour" in August 2011. His continuous growing success in the Euro-dance scene led to his international hit "Party Shaker" with R.I.O. that made it to the Top Ten in Austria, Germany and Switzerland and became a Top 40 hit in both France and the Netherlands.

== Early life and education ==
Nick Constantine Maniatty was born on August 7, 1977, in the borough of Queens, New York City. He attended Northeastern University. He had spending summers working in St. John U.S. Virgin Islands where his family lives.

== Career ==
After collaborating with European dance producers, he became popular with European night clubs, particularly after collaborating with a number of European artists, most notably with Austrian DJs Darius & Finlay starting 2009 appearing in a number of mixes and recordings and making an impact in Austria and Germany with recordings like "Do It All Night" and "Destination" released by Trak Music and "Rock to the Beat", "Hold On" and "Till Morning" released by Sony Germany. He also collaborated with Polish producer and DJ Robert M. on "Can't Slow Down", "In Trouble", as well as on "Dance Hall Track", which was a hit in Poland and was certified gold. He came back in 2012 with a new version of "Do It All Night" with Darius & Finlay featuring Zimbabwe-born German rapper Carlprit and Nicco. Nicco recently collaborated with R.I.O., as the voice of "Party Shaker", R.I.O.feat. Nicco, allowing him to broaden his international presence.

== Musical style and influences ==
Nicco molded his craft over the years and during his studies at Northeastern University in Boston Massachusetts. He moved to Queens, New York where he was singing and performing Dance-hall Reggae and Soca music in many of the well known Caribbean clubs in Brooklyn, New York. In the past 10 years Nicco has used his reggae influences to fuse both his vocals and rough chanting to formulate a new sound.

Nicco was influenced from a very young age with reggae music.

== Awards and nominations ==
- 2009: Won "Most Played Song of the Year 2009" at Polish FaMa Award for "Destination" (Darius & Finlay feat. Nicco)
- 2010: Won "Best Artist" and "Best Newcomer" at the Austrian Music Awards after nomination in 3 categories
- 2010: Won "Best Vocalist" at the Polish FaMa awards

== Discography ==
=== Solo ===
- "Downpour" (2011)
- "Baila" (2013)
- "Lockdown" (2014)
- "Summertime" (2015)

=== As Darius & Finlay featuring Nicco ===
==== Albums ====
- "Destination" (2009)
- "Do It All Night" (2009)

==== Singles ====
- "Rock to the Beat" (2009)
- "Hold On" (2010)
- "Till Morning" (2011)
- "Firestarter" (2015)

=== As Darius & Finlay featuring Carlprit & Nicco ===
- "Do It All Night (2k12 version)" (2012)

=== As Nicco & Dank ===
- "Into The Light" (2013)

=== As Nicco Feat. Ribellu ===
- "Ibiza" (2013)

=== As DJ Gollum & Empyre One vs. Nicco ===
- "Rockstar" (2014)

=== As Nicco & Chris Deelay ===
- "Remember" (2014)

=== As Solid & Sound vs. Nicco & Gemeni ===
- "Summertime (Farewell)" (2015)

=== As Lazy G vs. Nicco ===
- "Kiss Me" (2015)

=== As L.A.R.5 vs. Nicco and Jai Matt ===
- "Tropical Love" (2015)

=== As DJ Gollum feat. DJ Cap vs. Nicco ===
- "Together Forever (Official Easter Rave Hymn 2k16)" (2016)

=== As Nicco & Andre Picar ===
- "Work" (2016)

=== As Fevah & Nicco ===
- "Roll It" (2016)

=== As Nicco & Solid&Sound ===
- "Gunned Down" (2016)

=== Featuring ===
| Year | Single | Peak chart positions | | | | | | | Album |
| Year | Single | AUT | BEL (Wa) | FRA | GER | NL | NOR | SWI | Album |
|---|---|---|---|---|---|---|---|---|---|
| 2012 | "Party Shaker" (R.I.O. feat. Nicco) | 10 | 29 | 5 | 10 | 29 | 8 | 6 | Turn This Club Around (Deluxe Edition) |

- 2008: "Can't Slow Down" (Robert M feat. Nicco)
- 2009: "Destination" (The Rudenko Project feat. Nicco) [Single]
- 2009: "Hold Tight" (Chris Decay feat. Nicco) [EP, Klubbhouse Records]
- 2009: "Can't Slow Down" (Bastian Bates feat. Nicco) [EP, – Can't Slow Down]
- 2009: "When We Dance" (DJ Pedro & Stephan M feat. Nicco) [Musica Diaz Toro]
- 2009: "Put Ur Hands Up" (Wet Fingers with Nicco) [Single, Pozytyaka Sound]
- 2010: "Dance Hall Track" (Tom Mountain feat. Nicco) [album, High5 Records]
- 2010: "Dance Hall Track" (Robert M. feat. Nicco) [Loco Label Music]
- 2011: "Run it back" ('N Luv & Movetown ft. Nicco)
- 2012: "Run it back" (Tom Mountain and Nicco) [Planet Punk Music GbR]
