= Turn This Club Around (song) =

Single by R.I.O. featuring U-Jean

from the album Turn This Club Around
- Released: 16 September 2011
- Recorded: 2011
- Genre: Electro house
- Length: 3:21
- Label: Kontor Records
- Songwriters: Yann Peifer, Manuel Reuter, Andres Ballinas
- Producers: Yann Peifer, Manuel Reuter

R.I.O. singles chronology
"One More Night" (2011)	"Turn This Club Around" (2011)	"Animal" (2011)

U-Jean singles chronology
"Heaven Is a Place on Earth" (2011)	"Turn This Club Around" (2011)	"Animal" (2011)

"Turn This Club Around" is a song by German dance band R.I.O., featuring vocals from pop, R&B and hip-hop singers U-Jean and Tony T. The song was written by Yann Peifer, Manuel Reuter, Neal Anthony Dyer and Andres Ballinas. It was released in Germany as a digital download on 16 September 2011.

== Music video ==
A music video to accompany the release of "Turn This Club Around" was first released onto YouTube on 15 September 2011 at a total length of three minutes and twenty-seven seconds.

== Track listing ==
UK Digital download

1. "Turn This Club Around" (Video Edit) – 3:21
2. "Turn This Club Around" (Extended Mix) – 5:19
3. "Turn This Club Around" (Crystal Lake Radio Edit) – 3:38
4. "Turn This Club Around" (Money G Radio Edit) – 3:10
5. "Turn This Club Around" (Kardinal Beats Radio Edit) – 3:22
6. "Turn This Club Around" (Pokerface Radio Edit) – 3:29
7. "Turn This Club Around" (Astrixx Radio Edit) – 3:13

== Credits and personnel ==
- Lead vocals – Tony T. and U-Jean
- Producers – Yann Peifer, Manuel Reuter
- Lyrics – Yann Peifer, Manuel Reuter, Andres Ballinas
- Label – Kontor Records

== Charts ==
=== Weekly charts ===
Chart (2011–12)	Peak position
Austria (Ö3 Austria Top 40)	5
Belgium (Ultratip Bubbling Under Flanders)	83
Belgium (Ultratip Bubbling Under Wallonia)	46
Canada Hot 100 (Billboard)	95
France (SNEP)	96
Germany (GfK)	3
Luxembourg (Billboard)	1
Netherlands (Dutch Top 40)	34
Netherlands (Single Top 100)	43
Scottish Singles Sales (Official Charts)	26
Switzerland (Schweizer Hitparade)	1
UK Singles (Official Charts)	36

=== Year-end charts ===
Chart (2011)	Position
Austria (Ö3 Austria Top 40)	72
Germany (Official German Charts)	48
Switzerland (Schweizer Hitparade)	60

=== Certifications ===
Region	Certification	Certified units/sales
Denmark (IFPI Danmark)	Gold	900,000^{†}
Germany (BVMI)	Platinum	300,000^{‡}
^{‡} Sales+streaming figures based on certification alone.^{†} Streaming-only figures based on certification alone.

== Release history ==
Region	Date	Format	Label
Germany	16 September 2011	Digital Download	Kontor Records
United Kingdom	6 January 2012	Digital Download	Zoo Digital
