= Andres Ballinas =

- Birth name: Andrés Gunnar Ballinas Olsson
- Also known as: Andy Lopez
- Origin: Germany
- Genres: House
- Occupation(s): Singer, songwriter
- Instrument: Vocals
- Years active: 1999-present
- Member of: DJ Manian
- Formerly of: R.I.O., Cascada

Andres Ballinas (also known as Andy Lopez) is a German singer and songwriter.

He has written songs and was a featured singer for fellow German producers R.I.O., Cascada, Carlprit, and Manian. He entered the Eurovision Song Contest in 2013 as the writer of Cascada’s “Glorious”.

He has written many songs with these artists and these songs charted throughout Europe.

== Discography ==
Singles (with DJ Manian)

- “Dance Dance”

Singles (with R.I.O.)

- “Thinking of You”

Solo Albums

- Besame (2000)

Solo Singles

- “Noche Del Amor” (2005)
