= De Janeiro =

Single by R.I.O.

from the album Shine On (The Album)
- Released: 19 November 2007
- Recorded: 2007
- Genre: Dance
- Length: 2:42
- Label: Spinnin' Records
- Songwriter(s): Gottfried Engels, Ramon Zenker, Airto Moreira
- Producer(s): Yann Peifer, Manuel Reuter

R.I.O. singles chronology
"De Janeiro" (2007)	"Shine On" (2008)

"De Janeiro" is the debut single by German dance music group R.I.O. The song was written by Gottfried Engels, Ramon Zenker and Airto Moreira. It was released in the Netherlands as a digital download on 19 November 2007.

== Track listing ==
Digital download

1. "De Janeiro" (Radio Edit) – 2:42
2. "De Janeiro" (S&H Project Remix) – 6:16
3. "De Janeiro" (Micha Moor Remix) – 6:13
4. "De Janeiro" – 6:22

== Credits and personnel ==
- Producers – Yann Peifer, Manuel Reuter
- Lyrics – Gottfried Engels, Ramon Zenker, Airto Moreira
- Label: Spinnin' Records

== Charts ==
Chart (2007–08)	Peak position
Netherlands (Dutch Top 40)	9
Netherlands (Single Top 100)	14

== Release history ==
Region	Date	Format	Label
Netherlands	19 November 2007	Digital Download	Spinnin' Records
