= After the Love =

Single by R.I.O.

from the album Shine On (The Album)
- Released: 10 July 2009
- Recorded: 2009–10
- Genre: Dance
- Length: 3:34
- Label: Zooland Records
- Songwriters: Yann Peifer, Manuel Reuter, Andres Ballinas
- Producers: Yann Peifer, Manuel Reuter

R.I.O. singles chronology
"When the Sun Comes Down" (2008)	"After the Love" (2009)	"Serenade" (2009)

"After the Love" is a song by German dance band R.I.O. The song was written by Yann Peifer, Manuel Reuter, and Andres Ballinas. It was released in Germany as a digital download on 10 July 2009.

== Track listing ==
Digital download

1. "After the Love" (Radio Edit) – 3:34
2. "After the Love" (PH Electro Radio Mix) – 3:40
3. "After the Love" (Chriss Ortega vs. Steve Forest Radio Edit) – 3:35
4. "After the Love" (Mowgli & Bagheera Radio Edit) – 3:50
5. "After the Love" (Dan Winter Radio Edit) – 3:54
6. "After the Love" – 5:49
7. "After the Love" (Chriss Ortega vs. Steve Forest Remix) – 6:10
8. "After the Love" (PH Electro Mix) –
9. "After the Love" (Dave Kurtis Remix) – 6:43
10. "After the Love" (Mowgli & Bagheera Remix) – 5:45

== Credits and personnel ==
- Lead vocals – Tony T.
- Producers – Yann Peifer, Manuel Reuter
- Lyrics – Yann Peifer, Manuel Reuter, Andres Ballinas
- Label: Zooland Records

== Charts ==
=== Weekly charts ===
Chart (2009)	Peak position
Austria (Ö3 Austria Top 40)	41
Germany (GfK)	65
Israel International Airplay (Media Forest)	4
Netherlands (Dutch Top 40)	17
Netherlands (Single Top 100)	66

=== Year-end charts ===
Chart (2009)	Position
Netherlands (Dutch Top 40)	89

== Release history ==
Region	Date	Format	Label
Germany	10 July 2009	Digital Download	Zooland Records
