= Hot Girl (R.I.O. song) =

Single by R.I.O.

from the album Sunshine
- Released: 28 October 2010
- Recorded: 2010
- Genre: Dance
- Length: 3:36
- Label: Spinnin Records
- Songwriter(s): Yann Peifer, Manuel Reuter, Andres Ballinas
- Producer(s): Yann Peifer, Manuel Reuter

R.I.O. singles chronology
"One Heart" (2010)	"Hot Girl" (2010)	"Like I Love You" (2011)

"Hot Girl" is a song by German Dance-Band R.I.O. The song was written by Yann Peifer, Manuel Reuter and Andres Ballinas. It was released in the Netherlands as a digital download on 28 October 2010.

== Track listing ==
Digital download

1. "Hot Girl" – 3:36
2. "Hot Girl" (Extended Mix) – 5:09
3. "Hot Girl" (Wideboys Remix) – 6:50
4. "Hot Girl" (Money G Remix) – 5:20
5. "Hot Girl" (Soundpusher Remix) – 5:20
6. "Hot Girl" (Olav Basoski Remix) – 6:46

== Credits and personnel ==
- Lead vocals – Tony T.
- Producers – Yann Peifer, Manuel Reuter
- Lyrics – Yann Peifer, Manuel Reuter, Andres Ballinas
- Label: Spinnin Records

== Charts ==
Chart (2010)	Peak position
Netherlands (Single Top 100)	90

== Release history ==
Region	Date	Format	Label
Netherlands	28 October 2010	Digital Download	Spinnin Records
