= Turn This Club Around (album) =

Studio album by R.I.O.
- Released: 2 December 2011
- Recorded: 2007–2011
- Genre: Dance
- Label: Roxy Recordings

R.I.O. chronology
Sunshine (2011)	Turn This Club Around (2011)	Greatest Hits (2012)

Turn This Club Around is the third studio album from German Dance-Band R.I.O. It was first released on 2 December 2011 in Germany. The album peaked at No. 29 on the Swiss Albums Chart.

== Track listing ==
The album Turn This Club Around by R.I.O. features a collection of tracks primarily produced and written by the German dance music duo, consisting of Manuel Reuter (also known as DJ Manian) and Yann Peifer (known as Yanou). They are the principal songwriters and producers for the majority of the tracks on this album. Additionally, Tony T. (Neal Antone Dyer) contributed as a vocalist and co-writer on several songs. Collaborations with artists like U-Jean and Liz Kay also involved their contributions to the songwriting process.

Standard listing
No.	Title	Length
1.	"Animal" (feat. U-Jean)	3:32
2.	"Turn This Club Around" (feat. U-Jean)	3:21
3.	"Miss Sunshine"	3:23
4.	"Like I Love You"	3:23
5.	"Shine On"	3:23
6.	"When the Sun Comes Down"	3:22
7.	"Hot Girl"	3:39
8.	"Serenade"	3:35
9.	"Watching You" (feat. Liz Kay)	3:52
10.	"After the Love"	5:49
11.	"De Janeiro"	3:24
12.	"Can You Feel It"	3:23
13.	"Something About You" (feat. Liz Kay)	3:49
14.	"One Heart"	3:36
15.	"Lay Down"	3:14
16.	"Open Up Your Heart"	3:49

Bonus tracks
No.	Title	Length
17.	"Animal" (Spankers Edit)	3:50
18.	"Turn This Club Around" (Spankers Edit)	3:57
19.	"Miss Sunshine" (Remix)	3:19
20.	"Shine On" (Spencer & Hill Radio Edit)	3:02

== Charts ==
Chart (2011–12)	Peak position
Austrian Albums (Ö3 Austria)	28
German Albums (Offizielle Top 100)	66
Swiss Albums (Schweizer Hitparade)	29

== Release history ==
Country	Date	Format	Label
Germany	2 December 2011	CD single, digital download	Kontor Records

== Track listing ==
Deluxe version
No.	Title	Length
1.	"Summer Jam" (feat. U-Jean)	3:02
2.	"Party Shaker" (feat. Nicco)	3:24
3.	"Turn This Club Around"	3:21
4.	"Miss Sunshine"	3:24
5.	"Like I Love You"	3:24
6.	"Animal"	3:32
7.	"Shine On"	3:21
8.	"When the Sun Comes Down"	3:22
9.	"Hot Girl"	3:39
10.	"Serenade"	3:35
11.	"Watching You"	3:52
12.	"After the Love"	3:34
13.	"De Janeiro"	3:24
14.	"Can You Feel It"	3:23
15.	"Something About You"	3:49
16.	"One Heart"	3:13
17.	"Lay Down"	3:14
18.	"Open Up Your Heart"	3:49

Bonus tracks
No.	Title	Length
19.	"Summer Jam" (Crew Cardinal Radio Edit)	3:35
20.	"Party Shaker" (Whirlmond Radio Edit)	3:07
21.	"Party Shaker" (Selecta Radio Edit)	3:02
22.	"R.I.O. Megamix"	3:20
