= Shine On (R.I.O. song) =

Single by R.I.O.

from the album Shine On (The Album)
- Released: 6 August 2008
- Recorded: 2008
- Genre: Dance
- Length: 3:23
- Label: Zooland Records
- Songwriter(s): Yann Peifer, Manuel Reuter, Andres Ballinas
- Producer(s): Yann Peifer, Manuel Reuter

R.I.O. singles chronology
"De Janeiro" (2007)	"Shine On" (2008)	"When the Sun Comes Down" (2008)

Music video
- "R.I.O. - Shine On (Official Video HD)" on YouTube

"Shine On" is a song by German house trio R.I.O. The song was written by Yann Peifer, Manuel Reuter and Andres Ballinas. It was released in Germany as a digital download on 6 August 2008.

== Track listing ==
Digital download

1. "Shine On" (Radio Mix) – 3:23
2. "Shine On" (Spencer & Hill Radio Edit) – 3:02
3. "Shine On" (Soft House Radio Mix) – 3:21
4. "Shine On" (Mondo Radio Edit) – 3:21
5. "Shine On" – 6:03
6. "Shine On" (Extended Mix) – 6:05
7. "Shine On" (Spencer & Hill Remix) – 6:18
8. "Shine On" (Soft House Mix) – 5:36
9. "Shine On" (Mondo Remix) – 5:53

== Credits and personnel ==
- Lead vocals – Tony T.
- Producers – Yann Peifer, Manuel Reuter
- Lyrics – Yann Peifer, Manuel Reuter, Andres Ballinas
- Label: Zooland Records

== Charts ==
=== Weekly charts ===
Chart (2008)	Peak position
Austria (Ö3 Austria Top 40)	21
Bulgaria (BAMP)	9
CIS Airplay (TopHit)	2
France (SNEP)	8
Germany (GfK)	25
Hungary (Dance Top 40)	3
Hungary (Editors' Choice Top 40)	4
Israel (Media Forest)	1
Italy (FIMI)	8
Netherlands (Dutch Top 40)	20
Netherlands (Single Top 100)	43
Poland (Polish Airplay Chart)	4
Russia Airplay (TopHit)	1
Spain (PROMUSICAE)	22
Sweden (Sverigetopplistan)	10
Switzerland (Schweizer Hitparade)	17

=== Year-end charts ===
Chart (2008)	Position
CIS (TopHit)	6
Germany (Official German Charts)	99
Russia Airplay (TopHit)	5
Switzerland (Schweizer Hitparade)	65
Chart (2009)	Position
Switzerland (Schweizer Hitparade)	98
Russia Airplay (TopHit)	175

=== Decade-end charts ===
Decade-end chart performance for "Shine On"
Chart (2000–2009)	Position
CIS Airplay (TopHit)	14
Russia Airplay (TopHit)	16

== Release history ==
Region	Date	Format	Label
Germany	6 August 2008	Digital Download	Zooland Records
