= One Heart (R.I.O. song) =

Single by R.I.O.

from the album Shine On (The Album)
- Released: 2 March 2010
- Recorded: 2009–10
- Genre: Dance-pop, Eurodance, house
- Length: 3:13
- Label: Spinnin'
- Songwriter(s): Yann Peifer, Sven Petersen, Manuel Reuter, Andres Ballinas, D. Alexander
- Producer(s): Yann Peifer, Manuel Reuter

R.I.O. singles chronology
| "Something About You / Watching You" (2010) | "One Heart" (2010) | "Hot Girl" (2010) |

"One Heart" is a song by German house trio R.I.O. The song was written by Yann Peifer, Sven Petersen, Manuel Reuter, Andres Ballinas and D. Alexander. It was released in the Netherlands as a digital download on 2 March 2010.

== Track listing ==
Digital download

1. "One Heart" (Dutch Radio Edit) – 3:13
2. "One Heart" (Extended Mix) – 5:37

== Credits and personnel ==
- Lead vocals – Tony T.
- Producers – Yann Peifer, Manuel Reuter
- Lyrics – Yann Peifer, Sven Petersen, Manuel Reuter, Andres Ballinas, D. Alexander
- Label: Spinnin Records

== Charts ==
| Chart (2009) | Peak position |
|---|---|
| Netherlands (Dutch Top 40) | 24 |
| Netherlands (Single Top 100) | 68 |

== Release history ==
| Region | Date | Format | Label |
|---|---|---|---|
| Netherlands | 2 March 2010 | Digital Download | Zooland Records |
