= When the Sun Comes Down =

Single by R.I.O.

from the album Shine On (The Album)
- Released: 5 December 2008
- Recorded: 2008
- Genre: House
- Length: 3:22
- Label: Zooland Records
- Songwriter(s): Yann Peifer, Manuel Reuter, Andres Ballinas
- Producer(s): Yann Peifer, Manuel Reuter

R.I.O. singles chronology
"Shine On" (2008)	"When the Sun Comes Down" (2008)	"After the Love" (2009)

"When the Sun Comes Down" is a song by German Dance-Band R.I.O. The song was written by Yann Peifer, Manuel Reuter and Andres Ballinas. It was released in Germany as a digital download on 5 December 2008. In autumn 2017 the Dutch DJ and producer Kaaze released a big room remix of the track as a free download. Due to its premier during Hardwell's radio show Hardwell On Air, the track became popular.

== Track listing ==
UK Digital download

1. "When the Sun Comes Down" (Radio Mix) – 3:22
2. "When the Sun Comes Down" – 5:07
3. "When the Sun Comes Down" (Spencer & Hill Radio Edit) – 3:32
4. "When the Sun Comes Down" (Spencer & Hill Remix) – 6:12
5. "When the Sun Comes Down" (Dirty Rush Live in Rio Radio Edit) – 3:37
6. "When the Sun Comes Down" (Dirty Rush Live in Rio Mix) – 7:14
7. "When the Sun Comes Down" (Maddin Radio Edit) – 3:33
8. "When the Sun Comes Down" (Maddin Remix) – 5:27
9. "When the Sun Comes Down" (Balearic Flava Mix) – 8:55

== Credits and personnel ==
- Lead vocals – Tony T.
- Producers – Yann Peifer, Manuel Reuter
- Lyrics – Yann Peifer, Manuel Reuter, Andres Ballinas
- Label: Zooland Records

== Charts ==
=== Weekly charts ===
Chart (2008–09)	Peak position
Austria (Ö3 Austria Top 40)	54
Germany (GfK)	63
Hungary (Dance Top 40)	19
Hungary (Editors' Choice Top 40)	30
Netherlands (Dutch Top 40)	9
Netherlands (Single Top 100)	22
Israel (Media Forest)	4
Spain (PROMUSICAE)	9
Switzerland (Schweizer Hitparade)	62

=== Year-end charts ===
Chart (2008)	Position
Hungary (Dance Top 40)	90
Chart (2009)	Position
Netherlands (Dutch Top 40)	77

== Release history ==
Region	Date	Format	Label
Germany	5 December 2008	Digital Download	Zooland Records
