= Miss Sunshine =

Single by R.I.O.

from the album Sunshine
- Released: 13 April 2011
- Recorded: 2010
- Genre: Dance
- Length: 3:22
- Label: Zoo Digital
- Songwriters: Yann Peifer, Manuel Reuter, Andres Ballinas, Brad Grobler, Rob Janssen
- Producers: Yann Peifer, Manuel Reuter

R.I.O. singles chronology
"Like I Love You" (2011)	"Miss Sunshine" (2011)	"One More Night" (2011)

"Miss Sunshine" is a song by German dance band R.I.O. The song was written by Yann Peifer, Manuel Reuter, Andres Ballinas, Brad Grobler and Rob Janssen. It was released in Germany as a digital download on 13 March 2011.

== Track listing ==
Digital download

1. "Miss Sunshine" (Radio Edit) – 3:22
2. "Miss Sunshine" (Video Edit) – 3:18
3. "Miss Sunshine" (Extended mix) – 5:22
4. "Miss Sunshine" (Club mix) – 5:44
5. "Miss Sunshine" (LaSelva Radio Edit) – 3:57
6. "Miss Sunshine" (Giorno Radio Edit) – 3:27
7. "Miss Sunshine" (Giorno Remix) – 4:42

== Credits and personnel ==
- Lead vocals – Tony T.
- Producers – Yann Peifer, Manuel Reuter
- Lyrics – Yann Peifer, Manuel Reuter, Andres Ballinas, Brad Grobler, Rob Janssen
- Label: Zoo Digital

== Charts ==
Chart (2011)	Peak position
Austria (Ö3 Austria Top 40)	44
Germany (GfK)	50
Netherlands (Dutch Top 40)	17
Netherlands (Single Top 100)	54
Switzerland (Schweizer Hitparade)	43

== Release history ==
Region	Date	Format	Label
Germany	13 March 2011	Digital Download	Zoo Digital
