= R.I.O. =

German dance music band

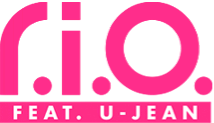

Background information
- Origin: Cologne, Germany
- Genres: Electro house, dance
- Years active: 2007-present
- Labels: Kontor Records, Zooland Records
- Members: Yann Peifer; DJ Manian
- Past members: Tony T.
- Website: rio-music.com

R.I.O. is a German dance music group. The members are Yann Peifer and DJ Manian, who originally founded the group in 2007. Until 2012, Tony T. was part of the group. Their biggest hit is the song "Turn This Club Around", which charted in the top 5 in Germany and Austria and at number one in Switzerland.

== Production and members ==
DJs Manian and Yanou founded R.I.O. in the middle of 2007, after success with joint projects such as Cascada and Tune Up!. R.I.O. was initially intended as an "experimental project". The name is derived from their first recording with the same title, as well as the re-release as "De Janeiro". In their songs Manian and Yanou are active as songwriter, composer and producer. Andres Ballinas, a good friend of the duo, collaborated as an author.

In 2008, Tony T. joined the group as the lead singer. Their debut song with him was "Shine On", where he played Jesus Christ (from Nazareth) in its music video. He then went on to play this same role in all the songs and music videos until 2011.

In addition to their own releases, they often appear as remixers. Songs by artists who record for their own label Zooland Records, for example the ItaloBrothers or King & White, as well as old and new single releases of the members Manian and Yanou are mixed by them irregularly in the ordinary R.I.O.-style.

Initially they released their songs on Zooland until they signed a contract with German label Kontor Records in 2011. Previously they had published individual songs on Kontor, but no contract was reached until 2011. Two more contracts for the international publication of their songs closed in 2011 with Swedish record label Roxy Recordings and Dutch label Spinnin' Records.

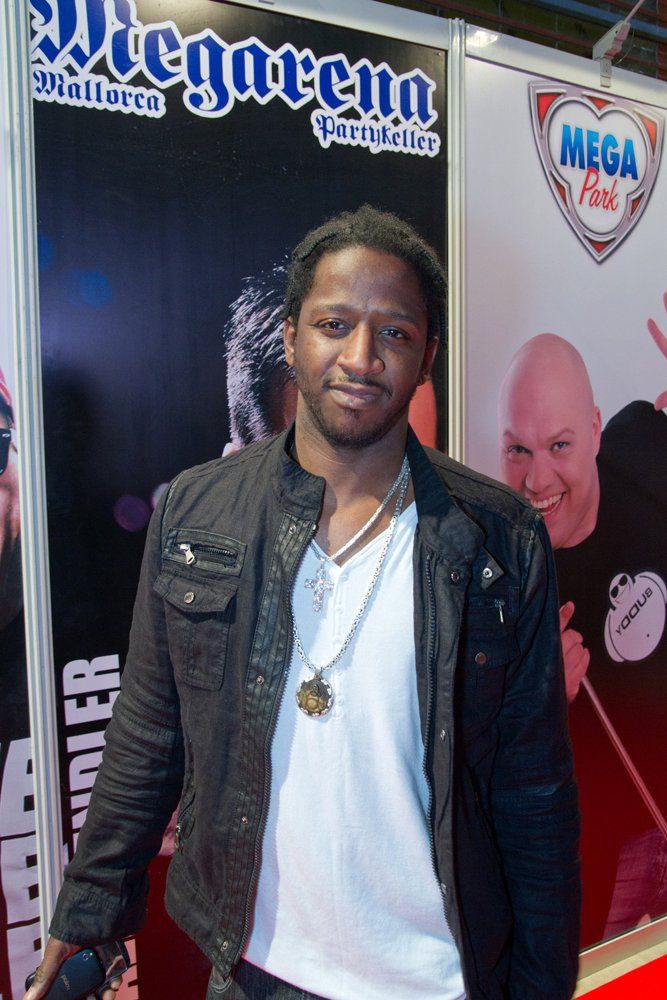
Tony T., the vocalist of R.I.O. from 2008 until 2012

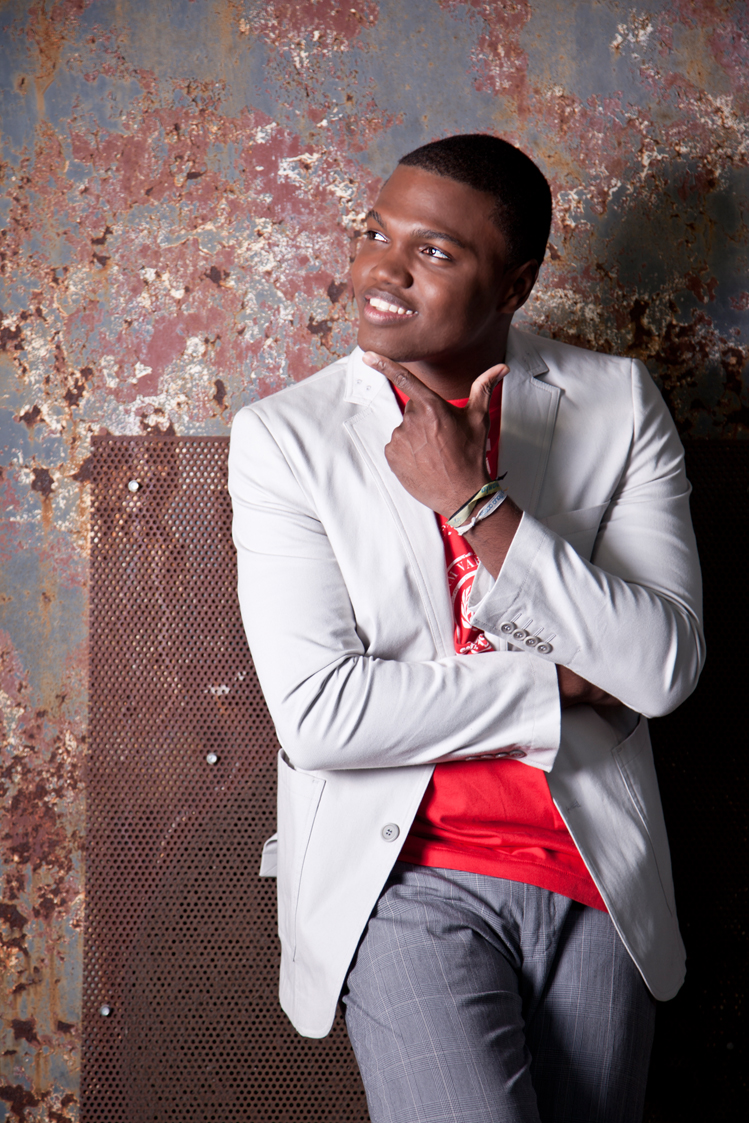
U-Jean, the vocalist of R.I.O. starting 2012

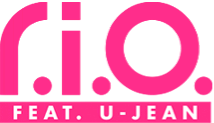
Logo of R.I.O. after U-Jean became vocalist of R.I.O.

On music videos and live performances, Manian and Yanou stayed in the background. Since the entry of British singer, rapper and DJ of Jamaican origin Tony T. (Neal Antone Dyer) in 2007, he was the face and voice of R.I.O.. American born-German pop, R&B and hip-hop artist U-Jean (Alex Hutson) was used in some recordings. In 2012 "Party Shaker" was sung by Nicco. This confirmed that R.I.O. was a project of two DJs featuring various voices. At live performances still U-Jean represented the duo.

After Tony T. left the project, R.I.O. became known as a duo consisting of Manian and Yanou with U-Jean performing at their concerts and in videos. Songs sung by U-Jean are credited as "R.I.O. feat. U-Jean".

== History ==
=== 2007: Origin ===
Yanou and Manian experimented in their studio, producing a cover of "Samba de Janeiro Bellini". The title was called "R.I.O." which was released as a single, but only in the form of remixes by artists such as Spencer & Hill, Stereo Palma or as MYPD, Manian and Yanou themselves. The track appeared on many labels throughout Europe. Although in Germany, it met limited success, in Spain, their version advanced to the top 10.

They picked up this project in the winter of 2007 and mixed the track again. On 9 November 2007 the song appeared in stores re-recorded as "De Janeiro". The original track "R.I.O." appeared on this single as a Spencer & Hill Remix. In no time the track became an international club anthem. The single reached number 8 on the Spanish chart and number 14 in the Netherlands.

=== 2008-2009: "Shine On" ===
A few months after the release of "De Janeiro", the duo released "Cool" by Lowrida in February 2008. In May Yanou remixed "Children of the Night". The two Cologne producers discovered the 36-year-old British singer and rapper Tony T., who eventually joined the project as vocalist and frontman. Shortly thereafter, they began as a trio to work on new songs and preparing their debut album.

In June, they released their first single "Shine On". Its popularity reached southern Europe and the entire Middle East, charted in most European countries, including peaking at number 25 in Germany, 21 in Austria, 17 in Switzerland and 22 in Spain. The video pulled over 30 million YouTube views. In September 2008, they performed a third time as a producer team.

The follow-up was "Turn the Tide" with R.I.O. member Manian and singer Alia. The original came from the vocal trance project Sylver from 2000.

In December, "When the Sun Comes Down" appeared. In November 2008, they were picked on the "Kontor Top of the Clubs Vol 41". The single reached the top ten of the Dutch Top 40 and Spanish chart and number 22 in the Dutch Top 100. It saw lesser success in Germany, Austria and Switzerland. No official music video was released.

On 10 July 2009, R.I.O. released "After the Love". This single was used on the compilation The Dome Summer 2009. In Austria, the track reached number 41 and number 65 in Germany, Netherlands and Portugal. In October the trio mixed the song "Brighter Day" and in November "Serenade" as a download. The single is based on the eponymous track of the American rock band the Steve Miller Band from 1976. Steve Miller and C. McCarthy were credited as songwriter.

=== 2010: First album ===
In 2010, they collaborated with Dutch singer Liz Kay. Their collaboration led to "Something About You" and "Watching You". The songs appeared on 12 February and became another success. They stuck for nine weeks at number 19 in Bulgaria. In Portugal, the single debuted at number 49 and rose for six weeks to number 34.

On 19 February, the trio released their first studio album Shine On (The Album). It contained all previously released singles, as well as some new tracks. In September a deluxe version was released, which also contained "Hot Girl". Neither of these releases reached the Top 100.

The seventh single "One Heart" appeared in three variations. It was once considered a two-track single in February in the Netherlands. Similarly, the song was released as a double single with "Can You Feel It", in some countries, as well as a three-single with "Can You Feel It" and "Lay Down" in April in the rest of Europe. In the solo version of "One Heart" Tony T. sings the vocals. On the Internet, a second version added singer Nina Nyembwe. In the Netherlands the single reached charted for 4 weeks, topping out at number 24. In Portugal, the single charted at number 21 and remained for 25 weeks.

"Hot Girl" was the last single release from Shine On (The Album). However, it appeared only on the Deluxe Edition. The song was released on 28 October as a promotional single in the Netherlands, where it charted for two weeks. They added a music video for the first time since "After the Love". It appeared on 13 July on YouTube, and was viewed over two million times. The only commercial success was in the Netherlands. "Hot Girl" is one of their biggest club successes. In addition, the track marked their transition from reggae to house style.

=== 2011: Sunshine and Turn This Club Around ===
On 11 February 2011, R.I.O. published "Like I Love You" as the first single and an announcement for their second studio album Sunshine. With "Like I Love You" they reached the top half of the charts again. The video was uploaded to the Kontor Records YouTube Channel on 4 January and was viewed more than 25 million times. The instrumental part of the song was sample of the same-titled song of the dance-trio The Hitmen . Together with Dan Winter, and the pseudonym Black Toys Manian mixed the track in the style of the original song.

In February 2011, R.I.O. mixed the single "Good Vibe" by the Good Vibe Crew along with Cat. The Good Vibe Crew is another project of Manian and Yanou. The song was released on 25 February on Zooland, but was not a success.

The successor to "Like I Love You" was "Miss Sunshine", a cover of "Sunshine" from 2001, produced by the Dance Project Dance Nation. This song charted in every German-speaking country of Europe. It was released in May in parallel with Sunshine. Sunshine featured old and new songs. The album made it to number 49 of the Swiss chart for two weeks. Also in May they released their first non-album single "One More Night", a cover of the same song by Phil Collins, as a downloadable single.

In the middle of 2011, Manian and Yanou met American singer and rapper U-Jean, who had aroused a stir with Carlprit. Together they recorded the song "Turn This Club Around", which served as an announcement for the next album. It peaked at number one on iTunes, where it stayed for 3 weeks. In the Media Control Charts "Turn This Club Around" made number three, while in Switzerland it reached the top. It was their first single that charted in the United Kingdom, hitting 36th place. It was their first to chart in Canada. In Germany, Austria and Switzerland, R.I.O. earned gold records for more than 150.000 sold units. It made the year-end charts of Germany, Austria and Switzerland, at 48, 72 and 60, respectively.

In September, the trio remixed "1234" by Carlprit. This mix became the official and only version of the track. The style of the remix is similar, very unlike their other remixes, the subject of their very successfully single "Turn This Club Around". Coinciding with the release of their third studio album, Turn This Club Around they released their thirteenth single "Animal", which was another collaboration with U -Jean. The song debuted on number 48 in Germany, 51 in Switzerland and peaked at 33 on the Austrian chart. Many critics compared the single with the song "Levels" of the Swedish DJ Avicii.

=== 2012: Turn This Club Around (Deluxe Edition) ===
In March 2012, Tony T. left the group to concentrate on his solo career. Shortly thereafter, he released "Way to Rio". Manian and Yanou then remixed "Rock This Club" by King & White in collaboration with Cimo.

Manian and Yanou recorded R.I.O.'s next single "Party Shaker", with American singer Nicco. It was a big hit in Germany, Austria, Switzerland and the Netherlands. "Summer Jam" then charted at number 2 in Austria and Switzerland and number 7 in Germany. It is a cover of "Summer Jam" by the Underdog Project.

=== 2013-2014: Ready or Not ===
Their first single in 2013 was "Living in Stereo", with Howard Glasford (vocals) best known from Shakira's single "Un poco de amor". It was released in March. The single peaked at number 70 in Germany, 32 in Switzerland and 41 in Austria.

On 10 May, R.I.O. released the single and album of the same name "Ready or Not". The album reached 4 in Switzerland, 26 in Austria and 47 in Germany. The single jumped to 54 in Germany and peaked at 40 in Austria. Later it charted in Switzerland for a week.

On 2 August, they released an eight-minute medley, consisting of "Turn This Club Around", "Like I Love You", "Animal", "Ready or Not", "Summer Jam", "Party Shaker" and "Shine On". In addition, the various music videos of the songs were edited together. It was offered on Kontor Summer Jam 2013, as well as a single-track on iTunes. In a few hours it reached the top 100 on iTunes. On the singles chart, the song charted after a week. In Germany and Austria it reached 19.

At the end of August, they previewed "Komodo (Hard Nights)" and published it on 27 September. This was another collaboration-with U-Jean. It was seen as using synths too similar to "The Code" of W&W and Ummet Ozcan. This song covered "Komodo" by Mauro Picotto, using similar background sounds. The track reached the download Charts of all online music services in hours. On the German singles chart, it reached 58th. In Austria and Switzerland "Komodo (Hard Nights)" debuted at number 45.

In October, a further remix appeared as a reinterpretation of "Maria (I Like It Loud)" by Scooter from 2003 and was featured 20 Years of Hardcore. The Scooters version was itself a remix. The first version was from 1997 by Marc Acardipane, Marshall Masters and The Ultimate MC as "I Like It Loud".

=== 2014-2015: "One in a Million" and disappearing success ===
On 4 July 2014, R.I.O. and U-Jean released "One in a Million", based on big-room-style. The single reached the charts of Germany, Austria and Switzerland. "Thinking of You" consists of vocals by songwriter Andres Ballinas as well as "Sun Is Up". These show a calmer style and did not chart but its release did accompany a music video.

In autumn, R.I.O. and U-Jean released "Cheers to the Club". It was supposed to be a solo-single by U-Jean, but they decided to release it as a collab-single. The commercial house track did not reach the charts.

=== 2017: Comeback with "Headlong" ===
On 16 March 2017, their label Kontor Records confirmed that the duo would start a comeback. One day later they presented "Headlong", a mixture of deep, and tropical-house. The second single from the comeback was released called "The Sign" featuring Vengaboys.

== Discography ==
Studio albums

- Shine On (The Album) (2010)
- Sunshine (2011)
- Turn This Club Around (2011)
- Ready or Not (2013)

Compilation albums

- Greatest Hits (2012)
