= List of top 10 singles for 2006 in Australia =

This is a list of singles that charted in the top ten of the ARIA Charts in 2006.

== Top-ten singles ==
Key

Symbol	Meaning
◁	Indicates single's top 10 entry was also its ARIA top 50 debut
(#)	2006 Year-end top 10 single position and rank

List of ARIA top ten singles that peaked in 2006
Top ten entry date	Single	Artist(s)	Peak	Peak date	Weeks in top ten	References
Singles from 2005
21 November	"Push the Button"	Sugababes	3	9 January	10	
5 December	"Stickwitu" ◁	The Pussycat Dolls	2	9 January	11	
12 December	"Everything I'm Not"	The Veronicas	7	16 January	8	
19 December	"Goodbye My Lover" ◁	James Blunt	3	16 January	16	
Singles from 2006
2 January	"Lift"	Shannon Noll	10	2 January	2	
23 January	"Run It!" ◁	Chris Brown featuring Juelz Santana	1	23 January	9	
23 January	"When I'm Gone" ◁	Eminem	1	30 January	7	
23 January	"Confessions of a Broken Heart (Daughter to Father)" ◁	Lindsay Lohan	7	23 January	1	
23 January	"Just Feel Better" ◁	Santana featuring Steven Tyler	7	13 February	5	
30 January	"Far Away" ◁	Nickelback	2	6 February	6	
30 January	"Love Generation" ◁	Bob Sinclar featuring Gary Pine	1	20 February	13	
30 January	"If It's Lovin' That You Want" ◁	Rihanna	9	30 January	3	
6 February	"Watching You" ◁	Rogue Traders	5	13 February	7	
20 February	"Flaunt It" (#2) ◁	TV Rock featuring Seany B	1	6 March	22	
20 February	"Pump It" ◁	The Black Eyed Peas	6	27 February	9	
27 February	"Wake Up" ◁	The Living End	5	27 February	1	
27 February	"Faded" ◁	Kate DeAraugo	8	27 February	2	
6 March	"L.O.V.E." ◁	Ashlee Simpson	5	6 March	3	
6 March	"You Raise Me Up"	Westlife	3	15 May	11	
13 March	"Forever Young" (#7) ◁	Youth Group	1	3 April	15	
13 March	"Sorry" ◁	Madonna	4	13 March	3	
20 March	"Stupid Girls" ◁	Pink	4	20 March	6	
27 March	"When It All Falls Apart" ◁	The Veronicas	7	3 April	7	
3 April	"Beep" ◁	The Pussycat Dolls featuring Will.i.am	3	3 April	11	
3 April	"All I Hear"	Kate Alexa	9	3 April	2	
10 April	"Together We Are One" ◁	Delta Goodrem	2	10 April	7	
17 April	"So Sick" ◁	Ne-Yo	4	12 June	11	
17 April	"Touch the Sky" ◁	Kanye West featuring Lupe Fiasco	10	17 April	1	
24 April	"SOS" ◁	Rihanna	1	24 April	12	
1 May	"Now I Run" ◁	Shannon Noll	6	1 May	2	
8 May	"Crazy" ◁	Gnarls Barkley	2	5 June	13	
15 May	"This Time I Know It's for Real" (#6) ◁	Young Divas	2	22 May	14	
15 May	"Dani California" ◁	Red Hot Chili Peppers	8	29 May	5	
29 May	"Black Fingernails, Red Wine"	Eskimo Joe	6	26 June	10	
29 May	"Yo (Excuse Me Miss)" ◁	Chris Brown	10	29 May	2	
12 June	"Running" ◁	Evermore	5	19 June	3	
19 June	"Hips Don't Lie" (#3) ◁	Shakira featuring Wyclef Jean	1	19 June	14	
19 June	"Who Knew" (#9) ◁	Pink	2	3 July	13	
26 June	"Temperature"	Sean Paul	5	10 July	7	
26 June	"A Slow Descent"	The Butterfly Effect	9	26 June	1	
3 July	"Promiscuous" (#10) ◁	Nelly Furtado featuring Timbaland	2	17 July	12	
10 July	"What's Left of Me"	Nick Lachey	7	14 August	9	
17 July	"Stars Are Blind" ◁	Paris Hilton	7	17 July	2	
24 July	"Unfaithful" ◁	Rihanna	2	24 July	11	
31 July	"Buttons" ◁	The Pussycat Dolls featuring Snoop Dogg	2	31 July	12	
31 July	"Nothing at All" ◁	Kasey Chambers	9	31 July	1	
7 August	"Mistake" ◁	Stephanie McIntosh	3	7 August	9	
7 August	"Ain't No Other Man" ◁	Christina Aguilera	6	7 August	6	
14 August	"I Wish I Was a Punk Rocker (With Flowers in My Hair)" (#1)	Sandi Thom	1	4 September	21	
21 August	"SexyBack" (#4) ◁	Justin Timberlake	1	21 August	15	
11 September	"Lonely"	Shannon Noll	8	11 September	2	
18 September	"London Bridge" ◁	Fergie	3	18 September	7	
18 September	"I Don't Feel Like Dancin'" (#5) ◁	Scissor Sisters	1	20 November	18	
25 September	"Taller, Stronger, Better" ◁	Guy Sebastian	3	25 September	6	
25 September	"Call Me When You're Sober" ◁	Evanesence	5	25 September	6	
25 September	"Maneater" ◁	Nelly Furtado	3	6 November	8	
9 October	"U + Ur Hand" ◁	Pink	5	16 October	9	
9 October	"When You Were Young"	The Killers	10	9 October	3	
30 October	"You Give Me Something" ◁	James Morrison	7	6 November	2	
6 November	"I Don't Need a Man" ◁	The Pussycat Dolls	6	6 November	5	
6 November	"Joker & the Thief" ◁	Wolfmother	8	6 November	1	
13 November	"The Saints Are Coming" ◁	U2 and Green Day	1	13 November	4	
13 November	"Live for Love" ◁	Anthony Callea	9	13 November	1	
20 November	"My Love" ◁	Justin Timberlake featuring T.I.	3	27 November	11	
20 November	"Hurt"	Christina Aguilera	9	20 November	1	
27 November	"Happenin' All Over Again"	Young Divas	9	27 November	2	
4 December	"Night of My Life" ◁	Damien Leith	1	4 December	5	
11 December	"Don't Give Up" ◁	Shannon Noll and Natalie Bassingthwaighte	2	18 December	11	

=== 2005 peaks ===
List of ARIA top ten singles in 2006 that peaked in 2005
Top ten entry date	Single	Artist(s)	Peak	Peak date	Weeks in top ten	References
14 November	"Hung Up" ◁	Madonna	1	14 November	11	
14 November	"Moonshine" ◁	Savage featuring Akon	9	14 November	2	
21 November	"My Humps" ◁	The Black Eyed Peas	1	21 November	9	
5 December	"Maybe Tonight" ◁	Kate DeAraugo	1	5 December	7	
5 December	"Because of You" ◁	Kelly Clarkson	4	5 December	7	
19 December	"Wasabi" (#8) ◁	Lee Harding	1	19 December	10	

=== 2007 peaks ===
List of ARIA top ten singles in 2006 that peaked in 2007
Top ten entry date	Single	Artist(s)	Peak	Peak date	Weeks in top ten	References
23 October	"Light Surrounding You" ◁	Evermore	1	22 January	15	
13 November	"Smack That" ◁	Akon featuring Eminem	2	1 January	15	
13 November	"Irreplaceable" ◁	Beyoncé	1	1 January	13	
11 December	"Wind It Up" ◁	Gwen Stefani	5	8 January	7	
11 December	"Fergalicious"	Fergie featuring Will.i.am	4	15 January	9	

== Entries by artist ==
The following table shows artists who achieved two or more top 10 entries in 2006, including songs that reached their peak in 2005 and 2007. The figures include both main artists and featured artists. The total number of weeks an artist spent in the top ten in 2006 is also shown.

Entries	Artist	Weeks	Songs
4	Fergie (including songs as part of The Black Eyed Peas)	22	"Fergalicious", "London Bridge", "My Humps", "Pump It"
4	Kate DeAraugo (includes songs as part of Young Divas)	21	"Faded", "Happenin' All Over Again", "Maybe Tonight", "This Time I Know It's for Real"
4	The Pussycat Dolls	35	"Beep", "Buttons", "I Don't Need a Man", "Stickwitu"
4	Shannon Noll	9	"Don't Give Up", "Lift", "Lonely", "Now I Run"
4	Will.i.am (includes songs as part of The Black Eyed Peas)	23	"Beep", "Fergalicious", "My Humps", "Pump It"
3	Pink	17	"Stupid Girls", "U + Ur Hand", "Who Knew"
3	Rihanna	26	"If It's Lovin' That You Want", "SOS", "Unfaithful"
2	Akon	8	"Moonshine", "Smack That"
2	The Black Eyed Peas	12	"My Humps", "Pump It"
2	Chris Brown	11	"Run It!", "Yo (Excuse Me Miss)"
2	Christina Aguilera	7	"Ain't No Other Man", "Hurt"
2	Eminem	14	"Smack That", "When I'm Gone"
2	Evermore	9	"Light Surrounding You", "Running"
2	Justin Timberlake	21	"My Love", "SexyBack"
2	Madonna	7	"Hung Up", "Sorry"
2	Nelly Furtado	20	"Maneater", "Promiscuous"
2	The Veronicas	12	"Everything I'm Not", "When It All Falls Apart"
2	Young Divas	16	"Happenin' All Over Again", "This Time I Know It's for Real"
