= Lost in Paradise (X-Perience album) =

Studio album by X-Perience
- Released: 10 November 2006
- Recorded: 2003–2006
- Genre: Synthpop Eurodance, Dance-pop
- Label: Major Records/PIAS
- Producer: Elephant Music, Hayo Lewerentz/Graham Laybourne, Koerba, José Alvarez-Brill

X-Perience chronology
Journey of Life (2000)	Lost in Paradise (2006)	555 (2020)

Singles from Lost in Paradise
- 1. "Return to Paradise" Released: 27 October 2006; 2. "Personal Heaven (Duet with Midge Ure)" Released: 23 March 2007; 3. "I Feel Like You" Released: 31 August 2007

Lost in Paradise is the 4th album by German band X-Perience. The album includes ten new tracks and three remakes of their greatest hits, "A Neverending Dream", "Circles of Love" and "Magic Fields". "Return to Paradise" was the first single, released in October 2006. The second single was "Personal Heaven", a duet with Midge Ure. With the last single "I Feel Like You", singer Claudia Uhle decided to leave the band.

Lost in Paradise was released after a break of six years since their previous album, Journey of Life. After touring and promoting the last album, Polydor/Universal released the promotional single "It's a Sin", a cover of the Pet Shop Boys song (2003). The band took some time off and Claudia released a solo-album under the name Angelzoom in 2005.

The album entered the German Album Charts on No. 78.

== Track listing ==
1. "I Feel Safe" – 3:55
2. "Return to Paradise" – 3:36
3. "Personal Heaven" Duet with Midge Ure [Album Version] – 4:01
4. "Let Me Show You" – 3:47
5. "I Feel Like You" [Album Version] – 3:30
6. "Dream of Love" – 3:34
7. "Million Miles" – 4:09
8. "Poison Kiss" – 3:48
9. "Heart of Mine" – 3:34
10. "Deeper Than Deep" – 3:55

=== Bonustracks ===
11. "Circles of Love" Alvarez Album Edit – 3:42
12. "A Neverending Dream" Alvarez Album Edit – 3:37
13. "Magic Fields" Alvarez Album Edit – 3:38

== Album credits ==
=== Writers ===
- Track 1, 4, 5, 6, 7, 8, 10, 11, 12, 13: Written & composed by Matthias Uhle and Alex Kaiser
- Track 2: Written & composed by Matthias Uhle, Alex Kaiser, Hardy Krech, Mark Nissen
- Track 3: Written & composed by Midge Ure and Glenn Gregory
- Track 9: Written & composed by Torben Nielsson and D-Insomniac

=== Production ===
- Track 1, 2, 3, 6 produced and mixed by Elephant Music
- Track 4, 5, 7, 10 produced and mixed by Hayo Lewerentz & Graham Laybourne at Triggertrax and Boogiepark Studios
- Track 8 produced and mixed by Koerba for K16 Music at K16 Studio
- Track 9 produced and mixed by Elephant Music in cooperation with Tone-Kind
- Track 11, 12, 13 produced and mixed by José Alvarez Brill for www.pleasurepark-studios.com

=== Personnel ===
- Vocals: Claudia Uhle
- Track 3: Vocals by Claudia Uhle and Midge Ure
- Track 1, 3, 9: Guitars by Mark Nissen
- Track 10: Guitars by Graham Laybourne
- Track 11, 12, 13: Additional keyboard/production by Henning Verlage
- Track 13: Additional guitar by José Alvarez Brill

== B-sides, rarities & outtakes ==
=== B-sides ===
- "Fireworks" – released as b-side on single "Personal Heaven"
- "Step Into the Light" – released as b-side on single "I Feel Like You"
- "Lay Down Your Guns" – outtake of album Journey Of Life, recorded 1999, released as b-side on single "I Feel Like You"

=== Rarities & outtakes ===
There exist plenty of demo and alternate versions of the album tracks. Many songs were edited and/or re-written during the three years of creating the album. Some of these versions were released on x-perience.de.

For a limited time, these songs were free downloads:

- "Deeper Than Deep (Alternative Mix with Piano Interlude)"
- "Let Me Show You (Alternate Demo Mix)"
- "Million Miles (Digital Dream Demo Mix)"
- "Million Miles (K16 Dream Dance Mix)"
- "Poison Kiss (Demo Version)"

"Dream to Me" is the name of a demo version of I Feel Like You. The song Joining Together is based on the same melody as Million Miles. Joining Together was limited released as Image-song for Böllhoff, a provider of fastening, assembly and systems technology. Dragonfly is an unreleased song which was only played live during concerts 2003–2005. This song was finally released in a new version on their sixth album We Travel The World in 2023.

In 2003, there were plans to include cover-versions of It's A Sin (originally by Pet Shop Boys) and Moonlight Shadow (originally by Mike Oldfield and Maggie Reilly) because they already played these songs live but this was scrapped.
