= Journey of Life =

Studio album by X-Perience
- Released: 20 November 2000
- Recorded: 1998–2000
- Studios: Bishop Studios, Hamburg
- Genres: Eurodance; dance-pop
- Label: Polydor/Zeitgeist (Universal)
- Producers: Axel Breitung (for Bishop Songs, Elephant Music); Politz/Wendlandt (for Turbobeat Music)

X-Perience chronology
Take Me Home (1997)	Journey of Life (2000)	Lost in Paradise (2006)

Singles from Journey of Life
- 1. "Journey Of Life" Released: August 1999 (non-commercial); 2. "Island Of Dreams" Released: 23 October 2000; 3. "Am I Right" Released: 12 March 2001

The album Journey of Life by German band X-Perience was released on 20 November 2000 in Germany. After the second album, Take Me Home (1998), X-Perience left their former record label WEA/Warner Music and signed at Polydor/Universal. The band start working on a new album right after touring and promotion the last album.

After a short break and releasing the promotional-only single "Journey of Life" back in 1999, the band released a second single in October 2000, "Island of Dreams", which was the main theme for the television show Expedition Robinson (German version of Survivor).

Not only the record label had changed, also the sound of the band expanded. The first two longplayers were dominated with synthies and electro sound, the third now has ethnosounds with Fiddle, Mandolin, Tin Whistle and other.

The album entered the German album charts at No. 41.

== Recording and release ==
The band started in 1998 with working on the new album. After the second album Take Me Home was released in November 1997, the band did some concerts and tours in Germany. The second and final single from Take Me Home was no commercially success. The band presented the first demos to Turbobeat who already produced the first two albums. On 4 May 1999 the band announced a new single called Journey of Life as first single of the third album which should be released with Polydor in the first week of August 1999. One week before the planned release, Polydor cancelled the release of the first single even if the promotion started and the first promotional copies were distributed. In the following months the band played some concerts, presenting new songs but with no official release date or statement. Only one year later, the band announced Island of Dreams as lead-single for the third album. The single was released on 9 October 2000. The album was announced for 20 November 2000. The sound of the band changed significantly, Polydor described the album with ethno-influences and world music. Island of Dreams was also the main theme for Expedition Robinson (German version of Survivor) and the sound of the song already changed. On the final release only the song The Meaning of Life, a duet with Joachim Witt was produced by Turbobeat. The other songs were rerecorded up to three times with different teams. In the end the songs on the album were produced by Turbobeat, Axel Breitung and team and Elephant Music.

Beside the promotional only single Journey of Life which was planned for an August 1999 release, the first single Island of Dreams was released on 25 September 2000. The second and final single of the album was Am I Right as double-a-side single with The Meaning of Life, a duet with Joachim Witt, released on 13 March 2001.

== Track listing ==
1. "Island Of Dreams" – 3:09
2. "Strong Enough" – 4:10
3. "Journey Of Life" – 3:39
4. "Am I Right" – 3:26
5. "Come into My Life" – 3:45
6. "I Want You" – 3:16
7. "The Holy Mountain" – 4:33
8. "The Meaning Of Life" (Duet with Joachim Witt) – 4:07
9. "Back to the Roots" – 4:02
10. "Say Good-Bye" – 4:14
11. "Diggin' For Gold" – 3:39
12. "Y2K01" – 3:24
13. "Don't You Know" – 3:19

== B-sides, rarities & outtakes ==
B-sides

- "Because The Night" – released as b-side on single "Am I Right"

Rarities & outtakes

- "Lay Down Your Guns" – recorded 1999, later released as b-side on single "I Feel Like You"

There exists a plenty of demo and alternate versions of the album tracks. Many songs were re-written, re-written and/or re-produced during the three years of producing the album. The band worked with different teams of producers, so the styles and directions of the songs changed. Most of these demo tracks were released on x-perience.de as free downloads for a limited time years later. Such as

- "1999" Demo of "Y2K01"
- "Back to the Roots" Axel Breitung Mix
- "Come into My Life" Axel Breitung Mix
- "End Of This World" Demo of "The Meaning of Life", without Joachim Witt
- "Diggin' For Gold" Turbobeat Mix
- "Don't You Know" Axel Breitung Mix
- "I Want You (To Want Me)" Demo with alternate lyrics
- "I Want You (To Want Me)" Spanish Radio Edit
- "Say Good-Bye" Long Version
