= Everytime We Touch (album) =

Studio album by Cascada
- Released: 21 February 2006
- Recorded: 2004–2006
- Genres: Eurodance; dance-pop; trance
- Length: 48:19
- Labels: Zooland Records, Robbins Entertainment
- Producers: Manuel Reuter, Yann Peifer

Cascada chronology
Everytime We Touch (2006)	Perfect Day (2007)

Singles from Everytime We Touch
- 1. "Bad Boy" Released: 02 September 2004; 2. "Miracle" Released: 23 November 2004; 3. "Everytime We Touch" Released: 16 August 2005; 4. "How Do You Do!" Released: 30 September 2005; 5. "Truly, Madly, Deeply" Released: 31 January 2006; 6. "A Neverending Dream" Released: 4 March 2006; 7. "Ready for Love" Released: 16 September 2006

Everytime We Touch is the debut studio album by German Eurodance trio Cascada (consisting of DJ Manian, Natalie Horler and Yanou). It was released on 21 February 2006. Recording sessions for the album took place from Autumn 2004 through January 2006, most of which was recorded after the third single from the album "Everytime We Touch" rose to popularity; the final recording session was completed in three weeks. The entire album was produced by Yanou and DJ Manian, containing heavily of up-tempo Eurodance tracks, many of which are covers of hit songs from the 1980s and 1990s of the synthpop, Eurodance, and rock genres. Musically, the album is composed of dance tracks with thick Euro synths, trance beats that clock in at over 140 beats per minute and Europop lyrics. Lyrically, the album is composed of songs about love and dance floor euphoria.

Critical reception of the album has been mixed, with many critics disliking the repetitive beats and what they saw as filler. Most critics did admire, however, its chart success for a dance album in the tough US music market. The album has sold about 2 million copies worldwide. There was a total of seven singles released from the album. "Miracle" and "Everytime We Touch" were released in America and were the only singles that received gold and platinum certifications. Along with "Truly, Madly, Deeply", these singles attained notable chart success internationally, peaking in the top ten in countries like the United Kingdom, Ireland and Sweden. "A Neverending Dream", Bad Boy and "How Do You Do!" achieved minor chart success in Ireland, the United Kingdom and Austria respectively.

== Release ==
The song "One More Night" was first released as part of an EP in 2004, alongside "Love Again" (originally released by Ziria under the title "This Summer") and "Ready for Love", and in 2007 released as a maxi-single in Canada only. The 3-track e-Single features 2 remixes by Wild Ace and the original album version. The "Wild Ace Club Mix" is also found on a mixed-compilation CD called "HitMix 2007" sponsored by a Toronto (Canada) radio station called Z103.5 and mixed by DJ Danny D. As with most electronic music, there are many remixes. Due to the remix package leaking online, many unofficial mixes were made in addition to the official mixes. Finally, all the official mixes can be found on promo-series CDs worldwide.

On 7 November 2012, Cascada's official YouTube page uploaded an unplugged version of "Ready for Love", similarly to Cascada's previous 'Candlelight' Remixes.

== Critical reception ==
Professional ratings
Review scores
Source	Rating
AllMusic	2.5/5 stars
Rolling Stone	2/5 stars
Stylus Magazine	C+
USA Today	3/4 stars

Sharon Mawer of AllMusic said the album's songs were for "dancing to" in a "club with lights flashing and people all around" but said that "after an hour of the same repetitive beat, one's senses can become a little jaded." Dom Passantino from Stylus Magazine gave the album a C+ and said the album had "a lot of filler" and called "Everytime We Touch" unoriginal. Ken Barnes of USA Today awarded the album 3 out of 4 stars and said that "you couldn't ask for a more insanely infectious concoction."

== Chart performance ==
The album was accidentally released on iTunes for digital download on 11 February 2006, ten days before its scheduled release, in what was said to be a computer error. The album entered the Billboard 200 at number 67, selling over 17,000 copies in its first week. It has gone on to sell over 100,000 copies in the US.

In the United Kingdom, the album entered the charts at #6. It then went on to peak at #2. It spent 28 weeks in the UK Albums Top 75, and 35 weeks in the Ireland Albums Top 75 (where it peaked at #1). The album went on to sell over 600,000 copies in the UK, achieving Platinum Certification.

== Track listing ==
All tracks produced by Yann "Yanou" Peifer and Manuel "DJ Manian" Reuter.

Everytime We Touch track listing
No.	Title	Writer(s)	Length
1.	"Everytime We Touch"	Peter Risavy; Maggie Reilly; Stuart MacKillop	3:19
2.	"How Do You Do!"	Per Gessle	3:15
3.	"Bad Boy"	Yann "Yanou" Peifer; Manuel "DJ Manian" Reuter	3:12
4.	"Miracle"	Peifer; Reuter	3:38
5.	"Another You"	Peifer; Reuter	3:37
6.	"Ready for Love"	Peifer; Reuter	3:23
7.	"Can't Stop the Rain"	Allan Eshuijs; Peifer; Reuter	3:28
8.	"Kids in America"	Ricky Wilde; Marty Wilde	3:00
9.	"A Neverending Dream"	Alexander Kaiser; Matthew Uhle	3:23
10.	"Truly Madly Deeply"	Darren Hayes; Daniel Jones	4:12
11.	"One More Night"	Peifer; Reuter	3:42
12.	"Wouldn't It Be Good"	Nik Kershaw	3:27
13.	"Love Again"	Peifer; Reuter	3:28
14.	"Everytime We Touch" (Yanou's Candlelight Mix)	Risavy; Reilly; Mackillop	3:15

Japan release additional tracks
No.	Title	Writer(s)	Length
15.	"Everytime We Touch" (Verano Radio Edit)	Risavy; Reilly; Mackillop	3:36
16.	"Everytime We Touch" (Rocco vs. Bass-T Remix Edit)	Risavy; Reilly; Mackillop	3:06
17.	"Bad Boy" (Cannon Cracker Remix Radio Edit)	Peifer; Reuter	3:01

German release additional tracks
No.	Title	Length
1.	"Everytime We Touch" (Club Mix)	5:31
2.	"How Do You Do" (Original Mix)	5:06
3.	"A Neverending Dream" (Club Mix)	4:57
4.	"A Neverending Dream" (Deepforces Remix)	6:09
5.	"A Neverending Dream" (The Real Booty Babes Remix)	5:58

=== Singaporean release ===
==== Disc one ====
1. "Everytime We Touch" – 3:10
2. "A Neverending Dream" – 3:23
3. "Bad Boy" – 3:13
4. "How Do You Do!" – 2:52
5. "Another You" – 3:38
6. "Miracle" – 3:39
7. "Can't Stop the Rain" – 3:29
8. "Kids in America" – 3:01
9. "Love Again" – 3:28
10. "One More Night" – 3:44
11. "Truly Madly Deeply" – 4:13
12. "Ready for Love" – 3:24
13. "Wouldn't It Be Good" – 3:28
14. "Everytime We Touch" (Yanou's Candlelight Mix) – 3:17

==== Disc two ====
1. "A Neverending Dream" (Original Club Mix) – 4:57
2. "A Neverending Dream" (The Real Booty Babes Remix) – 5:59
3. "Everytime We Touch" (Original Club Mix) – 5:32
4. "Everytime We Touch" (Rocco Vs. Bass-T Remix) – 5:41
5. "How Do You Do!" (Rob Mayth Remix) – 5:32
6. "How Do You Do!" (Tune Up! Remix) – 5:29
7. "Bad Boy" (Original Club Mix) – 6:16
8. "Bad Boy" (Central Seven Remix) – 5:57
9. "Miracle" (Original Club Mix) – 6:09
10. "Miracle" (The Usual Suspects Presents EXR Remix) – 6:22

=== UK release ===
Includes all 14 tracks from the first release (US) in rearranged order along with the following two remixes:

14. "Truly Madly Deeply" (Radio Edit) – 2:57
15. "Everytime We Touch" (Yanou's Candlelight mix) – 3:15

=== Australian release ===
Includes all 14 tracks from the first release (US) in rearranged order along with the following remixes:

15. "Everytime We Touch" (Club Mix) – 5:32
16. "How Do You Do!" (Club Mix) – 5:05
17. "A Neverending Dream" (Club Mix) – 4:58
18. "A Neverending Dream" (Deepforces Remix) – 6:10
19. "A Neverending Dream" (The Real Booty Babes Remix) – 5:59

=== Premium Edition ===
Web Release: Zoo Digital: Cat: ZDS 088

1. Everytime We Touch – 3:17
2. Ready For Love – 3:23
3. Miracle – 3:38
4. How Do You Do – 3:15
5. Can't Stop The Rain – 3:28
6. Truly Madly Deeply (eurotrance version) – 2:55
7. Wouldn't It Be Good – 3:27
8. Bad Boy – 3:11
9. Another You – 3:37
10. A Neverending Dream – 3:22
11. Love Again – 3:27
12. Kids In America – 3:00
13. One More Night – 3:42
14. Truly Madly Deeply (pop version) – 4:11
15. Everytime We Touch (Yanou's Candlelight mix) – 3:15
16. Everytime We Touch (club mix) – 5:31
17. Everytime We Touch (Rocco vs Bass-T remix) – 5:41
18. Everytime We Touch (2-4 Grooves remix) – 6:15
19. Everytime We Touch (Verano remix) – 5:51
20. Ready For Love (club mix) – 4:54
21. Ready For Love (ItaloBrothers New vox remix) – 5:23
22. Miracle (original mix) – 6:08
23. Miracle (The Hitmen remix) – 6:54
24. Miracle (Alex M remix) – 6:46
25. Miracle (Sunset Crew remix) – 6:21
26. How Do You Do (original mix) – 5:04
27. How Do You Do (Megara vs DJ Lee remix) – 7:05
28. How Do You Do (Rob Mayth remix) – 5:30
29. Can't Stop The Rain (club mix) – 5:03
30. Can't Stop The Rain (Mainfield Hardspace remix) – 7:16
31. Truly Madly Deeply (club mix) – 4:32
32. Truly Madly Deeply (2-4 Grooves remix) – 6:00
33. Truly Madly Deeply (Thomas Gold remix) – 8:32
34. Truly Madly Deeply (Tune Up! remix) – 4:33
35. Wouldn't It Be Good (club mix) – 5:07
36. Bad Boy (original mix) – 6:15
37. Bad Boy (Pulsedriver remix) – 5:54
38. A Neverending Dream (club mix) – 4:56
39. A Neverending Dream (The Real Booty Babes remix) – 5:58
40. A Neverending Dream (Digital Dog remix) – 6:26
41. A Neverending Dream (Deepforces remix) – 6:09
42. Love Again (club mix) – 5:29
43. Love Again (Rob Mayth remix) – 6:23
44. Kids In America (original mix) – 4:18
45. One More Night (club mix) – 5:32

== Personnel ==
- Frank Ehrlich – management
- Natalie Horler – vocals
- Rebecca Meek – design
- Yann "Yanou" Peifer – mixing
- Manuel "Manian" Reuter – mixing
- Joe Yannece – mastering
- Armin Zedler – photography

== Chart positions ==
=== Weekly charts ===
Chart (2006–2007)	Peak position
Austrian Albums (Ö3 Austria)	31
Belgian Albums (Ultratop Wallonia)	47
Canadian Albums (Billboard)	52
Dutch Albums (Album Top 100)	40
French Albums (SNEP)	11
German Albums (Offizielle Top 100)	50
Irish Albums (IRMA)	1
Japanese Albums (Oricon)	49
Norwegian Albums (VG-lista)	14
Scottish Albums (Official Charts)	1
Swedish Albums (Sverigetopplistan)	10
Swiss Albums (Schweizer Hitparade)	48
UK Albums (Official Charts)	2
UK Dance Albums (Official Charts)	1
UK Album Downloads (Official Charts)	9
US Billboard 200	67
US Top Dance Albums (Billboard)	3
World Albums (Top 40)	33

=== Year-end charts ===
Chart (2006)	Position
US Top Dance/Electronic Albums (Billboard)	7

Chart (2007)	Position
Irish Albums (IRMA)	8
UK Albums (OCC)	22
US Top Dance/Electronic Albums (Billboard)	18

== Certifications ==
Region	Certification	Certified units/sales
France (SNEP)	Gold	75,000^{*}
Ireland (IRMA)	Gold	7,500^{^}
New Zealand (RMNZ)	Gold	7,500^{‡}
United Kingdom (BPI)	Platinum	300,000^{^}
^{*} Sales figures based on certification alone.^{^} Shipments figures based on certification alone.^{‡} Sales+streaming figures based on certification alone.

== Release history ==
Region	Date	Format	Label
United Kingdom	5 March 2006	CD	All Around the World
United States	30 March 2006	CD	Robbins
Germany	31 March 2006	CD	Zeitgeist, Zooland
Germany	23 April 2007 (Re-release)	CD	Zeitgeist, Zooland
Germany	12 Feb 2010 (Premium Edition)	CD	Zeitgeist, Zooland
Canada	4 April 2007	CD	Awesome Music, Robbins
Japan	26 April 2007	CD	Pony, Zooland
Netherlands	3 May 2007	CD	Universal Music
Singapore	9 May 2007	CD	EQ Music, Zooland
Malaysia	9 May 2007	CD	EQ Music, Zooland
China and Taiwan (including Hong Kong and Macau)	9 May 2007	CD	EQ Music, Zooland
France	6 November 2007	CD	M6 Interactions
Sweden	2007	CD	Central Station
Australia	11 June 2008	CD	Central Station
Indonesia	2008	CD	
