= Moonlight Nights =

Studio album by Joachim Witt
- Released: December 1985
- Genre: Neue Deutsche Welle
- Length: 47:13
- Language: English and German
- Label: Polydor
- Producer: Joachim Witt, Peter Sawatzki-Bär

Joachim Witt chronology
Mit Rucksack und Harpune (1985)	Moonlight Nights (1985)	10 Millionen Partys (1988)

Moonlight Nights is the fifth studio album released by Joachim Witt in 1985. This is the first and only album from Joachim Witt that has all English vocals with the exception of So Tight being sung in German. However, Joachim Witt has been featured in other songs that have been written partly or entirely in English such as "The Meaning of Life" by X-Perience, "Back in the Moment" by Angelzoom and "Children of the Dark" by Mono Inc.

== Track listing ==
1. "Moonlight" (Joachim Witt, Jay Hawker) - 5:04
2. "How Will I Know" (Witt, Hawker) - 4:16
3. "In Grey" (Witt, Hawker) - 4:22
4. "So Tight" (Witt, Peter Sawatzki-Bär, Arthur Rimbaud) - 5:34
5. "When You Leave Your Love" (Hawker, Sawatzki-Bär) - 4:03
6. "Cool Down (Song for Lou)" (Witt, Storey, Storey) - 4:20
7. "Alana" (Witt, Hawker) - 6:09
8. "Burmese Days" (Witt, Hawker) - 4:19
9. "Why Don't" (Witt, Hawker) - 4:08
10. "Blue Dawn" (Sawatzki-Bär) - 4:37
