= Perfect Day (Cascada album) =

Studio album by Cascada
- Released: 3 December 2007
- Genre: Eurodance
- Length: 44:33
- Label: Zooland
- Producers: Manuel Reuter, Yann Peifer

Cascada chronology
Everytime We Touch (2006)	Perfect Day (2007)	Evacuate the Dancefloor (2009)

Singles from Perfect Day
- 1. "What Hurts the Most" Released: 21 November 2007; 2. "What Do You Want from Me?" Released: 7 March 2008; 3. "Because the Night" Released: 18 July 2008; 4. "Faded" Released: 26 August 2008; 5. "Perfect Day" Released: 3 March 2009

Alternative cover
- United States and Canada cover

Professional ratings
Review scores
Source	Rating
Allmusic	2.5/5 stars
Digital Spy	2/5 stars
Entertainment.ie	1/5 stars

Perfect Day is the second studio album released by German Eurodance act Cascada. The entire album was produced by the act's two DJs, Yanou and DJ Manian with vocals by Natalie Horler. Like its predecessor, the album is comprised heavily of uptempo Eurodance tracks, many of which are cover songs. This album, however, features covers of songs from the early to mid 2000s of the rock and country genres, with the exception of Because the Night (originally released by Patti Smith) which was released in 1978. Two edited tracks, "Endless Summer" and "I Will Believe It" that were previously recorded under the Siria name are also featured. Musically, the album is composed of Eurodance tracks with euphoric trance synths, drum programmings with a tempo over 140 beats per minute, and Europop lyrics. Lyrically, the songs are composed of love, partying and romance.

Critical reception of the album was negative, with many critics disliking the repetitive nature, that all the songs on the album sounded similar, and the lack of character and originality. The album has sold about 3 million copies worldwide. There was a total of five singles released from the album. Unlike their previous album, Perfect Day only had one major hit single worldwide. "What Hurts the Most" peaked in the top ten in six countries, including Austria and France and was certified gold in the United States for sales exceeding over 500,000 downloads. "What Do You Want from Me?" and "Because The Night" peaked in the top sixty in Austria, Germany and the United Kingdom. The last two singles, "Faded" and "Perfect Day", were released in the United States and Canada and failed to garner any chart success.

== Release and reception ==
In the first week of UK sales, Perfect Day sold 50,000 copies, debuting at number 12 on the UK album chart. However, in the second week it sold 100,000 copies, but fell to number 16. It then climbed back up, and peaked at a comfortable #8, before being knocked out of a weeks spot in the top ten. By the end of the year, the album had sold around 239,000 copies, making it the 64th highest selling album in the UK in 2007. The album has currently sold over 3,000,000 copies worldwide. The album was released on 4 March 2008 in the U.S. with a new cover and track listing peaked at a #70 in the U.S. Billboard 200.

The album was released in Australia on 15 March 2008. The album has been added to iTunes Italy in January 2008 being the first Cascada album released in Italy, but it was later removed; then on 2 January 2009 it was re-added. On 20 October, the album was due for a UK Platinum Edition re-release but was cancelled. The album was not released in the Netherlands until 7 November 2008. The Dutch version contains the American bonus tracks and the original track listing.

The album received negative reviews from most critics, with Sharon Mawer from Allmusic criticizing its repetitive nature by saying "How could anyone keep up the pace of these songs for a whole track, let alone a complete album, when the pumping beat is relentless and Horler, together with the production, contrives to make every song sound identical?"

== Track listing ==
=== European/Australian version ===
1. "What Hurts the Most" (Steve Robson, Jeffrey Steele) - 3:26
2. "Runaway" (Yann Peifer, Manuel Reuter) - 3:32
3. "Who Do You Think You Are?" (Yann Peifer, Manuel Reuter) - 3:24
4. "Because the Night" (Bruce Springsteen, Patti Smith) - 3:25
5. "I Will Believe It" (Yann Peifer, Tony Cornelissen, Manuel Reuter) - 2:57
6. "Perfect Day" (Yann Peifer, Allan Eshuijs, Manuel Reuter) - 3:45
7. "What Do You Want from Me?" (Tony Cornelissen, Yann Peifer, Manuel Reuter) - 2:48
8. "Sk8er Boi" (Avril Lavigne, Lauren Christy, Edwards) - 3:22
9. "Could It Be You?" (Yann Peifer, Manuel Reuter) - 3:47
10. "He's All That" (Yann Peifer, Manuel Reuter) - 3:08
11. "Just Like a Pill" (Alecia Moore, Dallas Austin) - 3:22
12. "Endless Summer" (Yann Peifer, Manuel Reuter) - 3:26
13. "What Hurts the Most [Yanou's Candlelight Mix]" (Steve Robson, Jeffrey Steele) - 3:54

Re-Release Bonus Tracks (2008)

14. "Dream on Dreamer" (Yann Peifer, Tony Cornelissen, Manuel Reuter) - 3:04
15. "Faded" (Matthew Gerrard, Jessica Origliasso, Lisa Origliasso, Robbie Nevil) - 2:49
16. "Holiday" (Jan Kask, Peter Agren - originally sung by Venke Knutson) - 3:15

=== US/Canadian version ===
1. "What Hurts the Most" (S. Robson, J. Steele) - 3:38
2. "Faded" (M. Gerrard, J. Origliasso, L. Origliasso, R. Nevil) - 2:49
3. "Holiday" (J. Kask, P. Agren - originally sung by Venke Knutson) - 3:15
4. "He's All That" (Yann Peifer, Manual Reuter) - 3:07
5. "Perfect Day" (Yann Peifer, Allan Eshuijs, Manuel Reuter) - 3:42
6. "Dream on Dreamer" (Yann Peifer, T. Cornelissen, Manuel Reuter) - 3:04
7. "Could It Be You" (Y. Peifer, M. Reuter) - 3:45
8. "Because the Night" (B. Springsteen, P. Smith) - 3:26
9. "Who Do You Think You Are?"(Y. Peifer, M. Reuter) - 3:23
10. "What Do You Want from Me?"(Y. Peifer, T. Cornelissen, M. Reuter) - 2:47
11. "Runaway" (Y Peifer, M. Reuter) - 3:30
12. "What Hurts the Most (Yanou's Candlelight Mix)" (S. Robson, J. Steele) - 3:52

=== Japanese version ===
Tracks 15 through to 18 are not produced in full, they are mixed together as a continuous song without gaps, also known as megamix.

1. "What Hurts the Most"
2. "Runaway"
3. "Who Do You Think You Are?"
4. "Last Christmas"
5. "Because the Night"
6. "I Will Believe It"
7. "Perfect Day"
8. "What Do You Want from Me?"
9. "Skater Boy"
10. "Could It Be You"
11. "He's All That"
12. "Just Like a Pill"
13. "Endless Summer"
14. "What Hurts the Most [Yanou's Candlelight Mix]"
15. "Runaway (DJ Yoshinori Remix)"
16. "Everytime We Touch (Styles & Breeze Remix)"
17. "Miracle (US Club Mix)"
18. "Ready for Love (Klubbingman Remix)"
19. "What Hurts the Most (DJ Uto Remix)"

=== Singaporean double CD digipak version ===
Disc 1: Tracks 1 to 12 from the original (UK) version
Disc 2: Bonus CD Single What Hurts the Most

=== Premium edition ===
Web Release: Zoo Digital: Cat: ZDS 093

1. "What Hurts The Most" - (03:39)
2. "Runaway" - (03:30)
3. "Who Do You Think You Are" - (03:22)
4. "Because The Night" - (03:26)
5. "I Will Believe It" - (02:54)
6. "Perfect Day" - (03:42)
7. "What Do You Want From Me?" - (02:47)
8. "Sk8er Boi" - (03:20)
9. "Could It Be You" - (03:44)
10. "He's All That" - (03:06)
11. "Just Like A Pill" - (03:22)
12. "Endless Summer" - (03:24)
13. "Dream On Dreamer" - (03:03)
14. "Faded" - (02:48)
15. "Holiday" - (03:15)
16. "Last Christmas" - (03:52)
17. "What Hurts The Most" (Yanou's Candlelight mix) - (03:53)
18. "What Hurts The Most" (club mix) - (05:07)
19. "What Hurts The Most" (Topmodelz remix) - (05:32)
20. "What Hurts The Most" (2-4 Grooves remix) - (06:49)
21. "What Hurts The Most" (Spencer & Hill remix) - (06:57)
22. "Runaway" (original mix) - (04:32)
23. "Runaway" (Manox remix) - (05:39)
24. "Because The Night" (original mix) - (05:32)
25. "Because The Night" (The Hitmen remix) - (05:49)
26. "Because The Night" (2-4 Grooves remix) - (05:45)
27. "Because The Night" (Mondo remix) - (05:58)
28. "I Will Believe It" (original mix) - (04:26)
29. "Perfect Day" (club mix) - (05:16)
30. "Perfect Day" (Digital Dog remix) - (06:04)
31. "What Do You Want From Me" (club mix) - (05:02)
32. "What Do You Want From Me" (DJ Gollum remix) - (05:24)
33. "What Do You Want From Me" (DJ Cyrus remix) - (05:35)
34. "What Do You Want From Me" (S&H Project remix) - (05:48)
35. "He's All That" (original mix) - (04:43)
36. "Just Like A Pill" (club mix) - (04:55)
37. "Dream On Dreamer" (original mix) - (04:10)
38. "Faded" (original mix) - (04:24)
39. "Faded" (Dave Ramone remix) - (05:48)
40. "Faded" (Wideboys remix) - (06:07)

== Personnel ==
- Armin Zedler – photography
- Frank Ehrlich – international management
- Joe Yannece – mastering
- Manuel Reuter – production, arrangement, mixing
- Natalie Horler – vocals
- Rebecca Meek – design
- Yann Peifer – production, arrangement, mixing

== Charts ==
=== Weekly charts ===
Chart (2007–2008)	Peak position
Austrian Albums (Ö3 Austria)	16
Czech Albums (ČNS IFPI)	50
European Top 100 Albums (Billboard)	29
French Albums (SNEP)	17
German Albums (Offizielle Top 100)	30
Irish Albums (IRMA)	6
Japanese Albums (Oricon)	50
Scottish Albums (Official Charts)	3
South African Albums (RISA)	9
Swiss Albums (Schweizer Hitparade)	81
UK Albums (Official Charts)	9
UK Dance Albums (Official Charts)	2
US Billboard 200	70
US Top Dance Albums (Billboard)	2

=== Year-end charts ===
Chart (2007)	Position
UK Albums (OCC)	64
Chart (2008)	Position
French Albums (SNEP)	141
UK Albums (OCC)	93
US Top Dance/Electronic Albums (Billboard)	22

== Certifications ==
Region	Certification	Certified units/sales
Ireland (IRMA)	Gold	7,500^{^}
United Kingdom (BPI)	Silver	60,000^{^}
^{^} Shipments figures based on certification alone.

== Release history ==
Region	Date	Format	Label
Singapore	7 December 2007	CD	EQ Music
China and Taiwan (incl Hong Kong and Macau)	7 December 2007	CD	EQ Music
Malaysia	7 December 2007	CD	EQ Music
United Kingdom	10 December 2007	CD	UMTV/AATW
Germany	14 December 2007	CD	Zeitgeist, Zooland
Japan	16 January 2008	CD	Canyon
France	25 February 2008	CD	M6
United States	4 March 2008	CD	Robbins
Canada	4 March 2008	CD	Awesome Music, Robbins
Australia	17 March 2008	CD	Central Station
Netherlands	7 November 2008	CD	Cloud 9 Dance
