= Perfect Day (Cascada song) =

Single by Cascada

from the album Perfect Day
- Released: 3 March 2009
- Recorded: 2007
- Genre: Eurodance
- Length: 3:44
- Label: Robbins Entertainment
- Songwriters: Yann Peifer; Allan Eshuijs; Manuel Reuter
- Producers: Yanou; DJ Manian

Cascada singles chronology
"Faded" (2008)	"Perfect Day" (2009)	"Evacuate the Dancefloor" (2009)

Audio video
- "Perfect Day" on YouTube

"Perfect Day" is the fifth and final single released from Cascada's second album Perfect Day. "Perfect Day" was released in the United States as a CD Maxi Single on 3 March 2009 and on 17 February 2009 on iTunes.
It was also released as a download in certain European countries on 13 February 2010, almost a year after the United States release.

== Background and writing ==
After the release of Cascada's 2008 Summer hit "Because the Night", it was rumored "Perfect Day" would be the next single released, but no confirmation was made. Natalie Horler had performed the song at Clubland Live 2008, but did not mention that the song would be released as a single. Again, on the Perfect Day Tour, Horler did not mention anything about "Perfect Day" being the next single, and did not perform any songs from the upcoming untitled album. Fans suggested it was just a rumor, as the next album was soon to be released, but the song was released as the third North American single following "What Hurts The Most" and "Faded".

== Track listing ==
United States

1. "Perfect Day" (Album Version) – 3:44
2. "Perfect Day" (Digital Dog Radio) – 3:21
3. "Perfect Day" (Rock Version) – 3:33
4. "Perfect Day" (Extended Version) – 5:18
5. "Perfect Day" (Digital Dog Club) – 6:04
6. "Perfect Day" (Digital Dog Dub) – 5:51

Europe

1. "Perfect Day" (Radio Edit) – 3:42
2. "Perfect Day" (Rock Radio Edit) – 3:31
3. "Perfect Day" (Club Mix) – 5:16
4. "Perfect Day" (Digital Dog Remix) – 6:04

== Release history ==
Country	Release date	Record label
United States	17 February 2009	Robbins
Europe	2 January 2009	Zooland

== Charts ==
Chart (2009)	Peak position
US Dance Airplay (Billboard)	20
