= Touch the Sky (Kanye West song) =

2006 single by Kanye West

Single by Kanye West featuring Lupe Fiasco

from the album Late Registration
- Released: February 14, 2006
- Recorded: 2005
- Studio: The Record Plant (Hollywood); Chalice Studios (Hollywood)
- Genre: Hip-hop
- Length: 3:57 (album version); 3:56 (radio edit)
- Label: Roc-A-Fella; Def Jam
- Songwriters: Kanye West; Wasalu Jaco; Justin Smith; Curtis Mayfield
- Producer: Just Blaze

Kanye West singles chronology
"Brand New" (2005)	"Touch the Sky" (2006)	"Impossible" (2006)

Lupe Fiasco singles chronology
"Touch the Sky" (2006)	"Kick Push" (2006)

Music video
- "Touch the Sky (MTV Version)" on YouTube

"Touch the Sky" is a song recorded by American rapper Kanye West for his second studio album, Late Registration (2005). The song features Lupe Fiasco in his career debut. It was produced by Just Blaze, standing as the album's only track to not include production from West. The song was released in the United Kingdom as a digital EP through Roc-A-Fella and Def Jam on January 1, 2006. On February 14, the aforementioned labels serviced the song to US mainstream radio stations as the album's fourth single. The next month, it was released in various countries for digital download by Roc-A-Fella and Def Jam and as a CD single through Universal Music, respectively.

After Just Blaze played West multiple beats, "Touch the Sky" was the one that he felt most passionate about. It is a hip hop track that includes a slowed sample from the Curtis Mayfield song "Move On Up" (1971). The song's lyrics center around West encouraging others to have as much confidence in themselves as he does. It was met with universal acclaim from music critics, with Lupe Fiasco's appearance gathering praise from the majority of them, though some critics were complimentary towards the production. The accompanying music video was released in February 2006 and directed by Chris Milk. Within it, West portrays the daredevil Evel Kanyevel in homage to Evel Knievel's unsuccessful jump across the Snake River Canyon. Evel Knievel sued West over the video in December 2006, though the two ultimately settled the lawsuit in November 2007. The visual received multiple nominations at award shows.

"Touch the Sky" peaked at number 42 on the US Billboard Hot 100 in 2006, while reaching the top 10 of the charts in Australia, Scotland and the UK. That same year, the song attained top 20 positions in Finland, Ireland, and New Zealand. It has since been certified platinum or more in the United States, the UK, and Australia by the Recording Industry Association of America (RIAA), British Phonographic Industry (BPI) and Australian Recording Industry Association (ARIA), respectively. West performed the song live at the 48th Annual Grammy Awards, 2006 Brit Awards and Saturday Night Live. The Milwaukee Brewers use this song for their home runs.

== Background and development ==
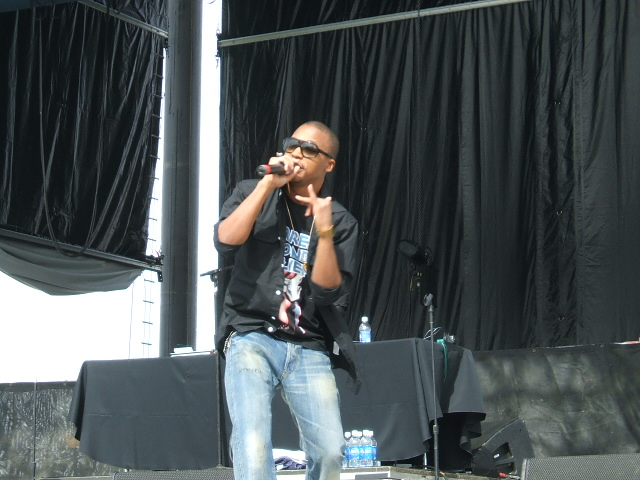
The track features a guest appearance from Lupe Fiasco, whose partner convinced him to collaborate with West.

During a July 2014 interview with DJ Skee for SKEE TV, rapper Lupe Fiasco revealed that he and West didn't meet through Chicago connections even though they both came from the city as West "was always in a different world." Initially, Fiasco didn't want to feature on "Touch the Sky", with him not "feeling the vibe" of the song at the time. After being persuaded by his partner telling him "Nah, you gotta trust me. You gotta do this," Fiasco ultimately agreed on the collaboration and stated of working with West that "from there on we kind of clicked up and kept it moving up until this day." The feature stands as Fiasco's career debut. Producer Just Blaze was asked to produce for West during a phone call with Roc-A-Fella Records, with the call leading to him being signed to the label and Just Blaze recalled "a lot of great music" being made. Throughout West's production career, comparisons have been made between him and Just Blaze.

A speed alteration method of sampling was first present within West's music on his debut single "Through the Wire" (2003) and this sampling method was used in West's music throughout his career. Just Blaze had been listening to singer-songwriter Curtis Mayfield at the time of sampling his work. The song was one of the tracks that helped West achieve mainstream success in the United States. When guest-hosting the radio station Beats 1 in December 2015, Just Blaze shared a number of previously unheard records from Roc-A-Fella musicians. An alternative take on "Touch the Sky" with Robert Glasper featured was among the records played by him.

== Composition and recording ==
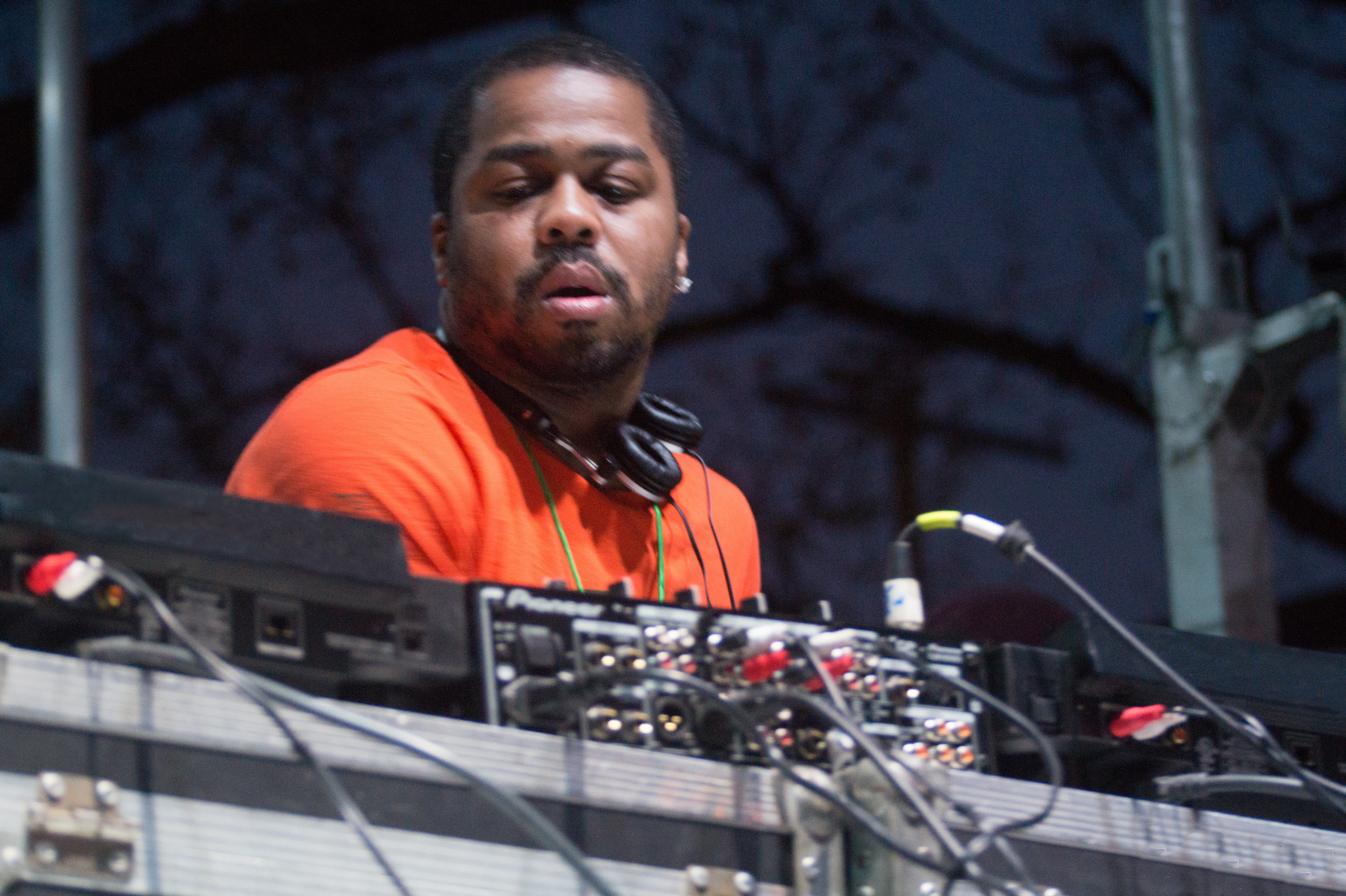
The record production of the track was done by Just Blaze.

Musically, "Touch the Sky" is a hip hop song. A slowed sample is included of Mayfield's 1971 recording "Move On Up" within the song, as written by him, alongside Latin horns. Lyrically, the song sees West give encouragement and inspiration to people for them to have a high level of self-confidence like him. A brief history of bright clothes in New York rap is provided by West, dating back to when he first signed to Roc-A-Fella years before the song's release. West insists with certain lyrics that even though he tried to right his wrongs, they helped him with songwriting. Lupe Fiasco performs the third verse, in which he uses a number of double entendres and metaphors.

Just Blaze solely handled the song's production, making it the only track on Late Registration to not be produced by West and also the only track from the album that the former worked on. He tried the Mayfield sample after nothing was really clicking in the studio and it was the beat that West felt passionate about when he played West multiple beats. When asked on Twitter about the story behind "Touch the Sky" in May 2016, Just Blaze revealed that he completed the production 20 minutes before West arrived at Baseline Studios. While "Touch the Sky" was produced by Just Blaze, the track was written by West, Fiasco and Justin Smith. It was recorded by Anthony Kilhoffer and Andrew Dawson at The Record Plant (Hollywood, CA) and Chalice Recording Studios (Hollywood, CA), respectively. The track was mixed by Mike Dean at Chalice Recording Studios, with assistant engineering from Richard Reitz, Matt Green, Nate Connelly and Mike Mo. Vlado Meller mastered the track.

== Release and reception ==
"Touch the Sky" was released on August 30, 2005, as the third track on West's second studio album Late Registration. On January 1, 2006, a digital EP was released in the United Kingdom for the song through West's labels Roc-A-Fella and Def Jam, which contains three tracks. The song was later sent to mainstream radio stations in the US by West's labels on February 2 as the album's fourth single. On March 7, it was released for digital download in numerous countries through Roc-A-Fella and Def Jam, with a radio edit and the instrumental included. A CD single was later released by Universal Music for the song on April 24, 2006, with the single consisting of three tracks.

The track received universal acclaim from music critics, who generally praised Lupe Fiasco's feature. Alexis Petridis of The Guardian pointed out the track as where West "wittily acknowledges the familiarity of the "Move on Up" (1971) sample by humming distractedly along." Sean Fennessey of Pitchfork called Fiasco an "impressive newcomer" and described Just Blaze's production on the track as "life-affirming." The lyrics "I'm trying to right my wrongs/ But it's funny, the same wrongs help me write the songs" were branded by Chris DeVille of Stereogum as "one of a handful of lines that could work as a thesis statement for Kanye West's career." DeVille elaborated: "He's as inflammatory and conflicted as ever here, and it lends Late Registration the same feeling of rawness and spontaneity that inspired Kanye's comment about George Bush." Keertana Sastry of Bustle ranked the track as the fourth best from the album and wrote of it: "Now this is the kind of monster hit track that I can get behind, and the track also gave us the genius that is Lupe Fiasco." David Browne of Entertainment Weekly called the track where West "throws his diploma-free success in our faces, marveling at his good fortune" and claimed for it to be "powered by" the sample of "Move on Up", while also writing of West's performance that he "can still be funny, as when he sings a snippet of 'Leaving on a Jet Plane'." In reference to the track's position on Late Registration, Spence D. of IGN claimed: "The groove gets a slight bump, thanks to horns and a more energetic stance from West on 'Touch The Sky.'" He described Fiasco as "who offers up call-and-response chanting in an echo chamber manner before he drops a buttery verse toward the end of the track." Luke McManus of RTÉ cited the musical style of the song as being "sample-based and classic," claiming for the Mayfield sample to be in reference to "the golden age of 1970s soul."

=== Accolades ===
Live About ranked the song at number 18 on their top 50 list of the best hip hop songs in 2005. On Pitchfork's list of the 200 best songs from the 2000s, "Touch the Sky" was listed at number 157 and the staff described the song as "Kanye at his humblest: Detailing his struggles and failures before exploding into that glorious chorus, outsourcing the beat [from producer] Just Blaze because nobody could've flipped that Curtis Mayfield sample harder." NME placed it at number 18 on their list of West's 25 best songs, with Larry Bartleet of the publication calling the sample "the beaming basis for this tune." Lupe Fiasco's verse was ranked at number 50 on a list published by Complex of the 50 best guest verses of all time.

== Music video ==
=== Background and synopsis ===
West financed the music video for "Touch the Sky" himself after he did not like the first version Def Jam paid for. Just Blaze commented on this in an interview: Prior to directing the music video, Chris Milk had directed for West in 2004 on the video for his single "All Falls Down". Fall Out Boy were originally supposed to star in it as reporters, though the band didn't appear due to being in Europe at the time of filming. The production cost for the video was approximately $1 million, making it the 25th most expensive music video of all time. The visual debuted in February 2006, and was filmed as a '70s style short movie about daredevil Evel Kanyevel, played by West, and his failed attempt to fly a rocket across the Grand Canyon. It was done in homage to Evel Knievel's unsuccessful jump across the Snake River Canyon in 1974 and West uses the music video to make fun of his huge ego. West also pokes fun at his anti-Bush outburst from 2005 and the possibility of his career arc ending with a crash-and-burn. The video features a cameo from actress and model Pamela Anderson, who opposes the daredevil character that West portrays. Actresses Nia Long and Tracee Ellis Ross also make appearances in it.

=== Lawsuit ===
In December 2006, Evel Knievel filed a lawsuit against West in the U.S. District Court of Tampa, Florida for trademark infringement. Specifically, Knievel's lawsuit cites the red, white and blue costume worn by West in the music video as being a copy of the jumpsuit that the stuntman wore on a September 1974 Sports Illustrated cover when preparing for his Snake River Canyon jump, with him including a copy of the cover as an exhibit to the complaint. Evel Knievel also took issue with the persona put on by West. West's attorneys argued that the music video amounted to satire and therefore was covered under the First Amendment. Just days before his death in November 2007, Evel Knievel amicably settled the suit after being paid a visit from West, saying, "I thought he was a wonderful guy and quite a gentleman," and stated that he and West "settled the lawsuit amicably." However, the two of them made an agreement to not publicly discuss the terms of their dispute.

=== Reception ===
Sydney Scott of Essence pointed out the cameos within the music video as what "definitely made for an interesting video." West reacted negatively to the video not receiving any nominations at the 2006 MTV Video Music Awards, saying during an interview, "It didn't get any nominations, but it's one of the most memorable videos of the year for me." However, at the 2006 MTV Europe Music Awards, the music video was nominated for Best Video. After not winning the latter award, West thought he should have won because the visual "cost a million dollars, Pamela Anderson was in it. I was jumping across canyons." The video earned a nomination for Best International Video - Artist at the 2006 MuchMusic Video Awards. It was nominated for Best Cinematography and Best Styling at the 2007 Music Video Production Awards. At the same ceremony, the music video was awarded Best Hip-Hop Video. Complex named it the fourth best music video of the 2000s decade.

== Commercial performance ==
=== North America ===
Though not released as a single initially, "Touch the Sky" reached number 72 on the US Billboard Hot R&B/Hip-Hop Songs chart for the issue dated November 5, 2005. After its single release, the song entered the US Billboard Hot 100 at number 90 for the issue date of February 25, 2006. On March 4, it climbed 20 places to number 70 on the chart. The song experienced a similar jump the next week, rising 18 places to number 52. After two weeks, the song then entered the top 50 of the Hot 100 on March 18 at number 47. The next week, it peaked at number 42 on the chart, attaining similar performance to West's single "Diamonds from Sierra Leone" that reached number 43 on the Hot 100 in 2005. "Touch the Sky" remained on the chart for a total of nine weeks. On the US Hot R&B/Hip-Hop Songs chart, the song reached its peak of number 23 on March 11. That same week, the song attained its highest position on a Billboard chart by reaching number ten on the US Hot Rap Songs chart. The song peaked at number 35 on the US Billboard Mainstream Top 40 for the issue of March 25, 2006. On September 23, 2020, "Touch the Sky" was certified platinum by the Recording Industry Association of America (RIAA) for shelving 1,000,000 certified units in the US.

=== Europe and Oceania ===
The song had its best performance in the UK, peaking at number six on the UK Singles Chart, giving West his fifth top ten single in the country. It remained on the chart for a total of 15 weeks. On the year-end list of the best selling tracks in the UK for 2006, the song ranked at number 93. It was certified double platinum by the British Phonographic Industry (BPI) for selling 1,200,000 sales-equivalent units on May 29, 2026. In Scotland, the song performed similarly, reaching number seven on the Scottish Singles Chart. It peaked at number 14 on the Irish Singles Chart, giving West his fourth top 20 single on the chart. Similarly, the song peaked at number 15 on the Finnish Singles Chart. "Touch the Sky" experienced less commercial success in the Russia and Germany charts, peaking at number 62 and 97, respectively.

"Touch the Sky" was successful in Australia, peaking at number ten on the ARIA Singles Chart; it stood as West's second top ten single in the country, following on from "Gold Digger" reaching number one in 2005. In 2015, the song was certified platinum by the Australian Recording Industry Association (ARIA) for exceeding 70,000 shipped copies. On the NZ Singles Chart, the song reached number 16 and stayed on the chart for seven weeks. West had previously reached the same position in 2003 with "Through the Wire", which also remained on the NZ Singles Chart for seven weeks.

== Live performances ==
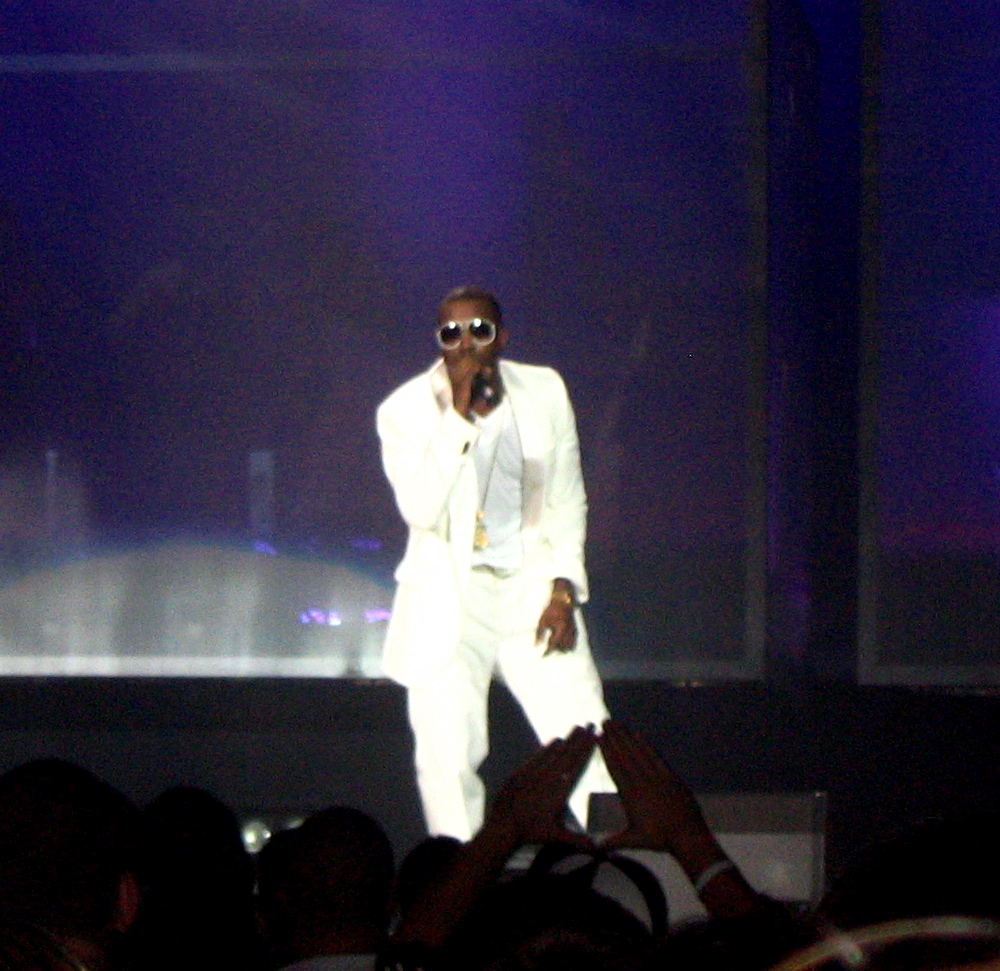
West performed the song live during the Touch the Sky Tour in 2005.

West's first televised live performance of "Touch the Sky" occurred at the premiere of season 31 of Saturday Night Live, with West transitioning from a melody of "Gold Digger" into a performance of the song. On October 11, 2005, West performed it live as the opener to the kickoff show of the Touch the Sky Tour at the University of Miami's Convocation Center. During the performance, West wore a light-colored shirt and pants, a suit jacket and sunglasses with white frames. West requested the crowd to shout lyrics of the song and they followed through with his request. On September 29, 2005, a performance of the song was delivered by West at Abbey Road Studios in London for his 2006 live album Late Orchestration. It was performed by West at the Air Canada Centre in Toronto as the opener again to a concert of the Touch The Sky Tour on November 9, 2005. West performed a medley of "Touch the Sky", "Stronger" (2007), "Good Life" (2007) and other singles at the Be the Change Youth Ball for the first inauguration of Barack Obama as US president on January 20, 2009. While performing, Kanye told the crowd: "Let's make some noise for our new president, Obama. It feels so good to be standing here," while also noting that his mother Donda West would be proud to see him performing for the president. In February 2009, Kanye West delivered a rendition of the track for his 2010 live album VH1 Storytellers. The performance began in a musically stripped down style, with only the bass and drums being present alongside West's vocals. When the track reached its climax, West revealed his "greatest pain in life." Towards the end of his performance, West showed self-awareness by admitting to having been "an asshole for so long."

On June 7, 2010, West performed the track live at Chicago's Farragut Career Academy during a concert for school children; this concert marked West's first live appearance since his incident with Taylor Swift at the 2009 VMAS. It was performed by West as part of his headlining set at the 2011 Coachella Festival. For his headlining live show at the Festival Mawazine: Rhythms of the World in Rabat on May 22, West delivered a performance of the track. At a concert in Atlanta's Philips Arena on October 28, 2011, during West and Jay-Z's Watch the Throne Tour, West came out to perform "Touch the Sky" after a wardrobe change. During the performance, he wore a tribal-type jacket, leather kilt, leather pants underneath and his glow-in-the-dark Air Yeezys, and Rob Markman of MTV called the outfit worn by Jay-Z at the concert "no match" for West's. When performing at Austin X's Music festival on June 8, 2014, West omitted Jay-Z's name from the song's lyrics, which he also did when performing "Blood on the Leaves" (2013) and "Cold" (2012) at the festival. West stopped the opening of the song when performing it live at the 2015 Glastonbury Festival, walking off after stating "that's not what we rehearsed in the dressing room." For his performance of the song, West entered a cherry picker that elevated to 30m in the air and floated over the crowd, who sung along with him. West performed the song live at the Air Canada Centre in Toronto during the Saint Pablo Tour on August 30, 2016. As part of the same tour, it was the 26th song to be performed by West during his 4th concert on the tour at The Forum in Inglewood, California on November 1 of that year and West got "rowdy" during the performance.

== Other versions ==
A cover version of "Touch the Sky" was played by eight-piece brass ensemble The Soul Rebels that included horns and was released on their mixtape Power = Power in 2013. Hip hop group The LOX, which consists of Sheek Louch, Styles P and Jadakiss, freestyled over the song in 2005 with a feature from Ace Hood. Urban Noize released a remix in April 2012 that includes vocals from Florence Welch alongside their interpretation of West and Fiasco's vocals.

== Track listings ==
Digital download

1. "Touch the Sky" (feat. Lupe Fiasco) [Radio Edit] – 3:56
2. "Touch the Sky" (feat. Lupe Fiasco) [Instrumental] – 3:57

US CD single

1. "Touch the Sky" (Album Version)
2. "Jesus Walks" (Album Version)
3. "Diamonds from Sierra Leone" (AOL Sessions)
4. "Heard 'Em Say" (Michel Goundry/ Video)
5. "Touch the Sky" (MTV Version/ Closed Captioned/ Video)

UK Digital EP

1. "Touch the Sky" – 3:57
2. "Jesus Walks" – 3:14
3. "Diamonds from Sierra Leone" (Sessions@AOL) – 4:12

== Credits and personnel ==
Information taken from Late Registration liner notes.

=== Recording locations ===
- Recorded at The Record Plant (Hollywood, CA) and Chalice Recording Studios (Hollywood, CA)
- Mixed at Chalice Recording Studios (Hollywood, CA).

=== Personnel ===
- Kanye West – songwriter
- Wasalu Jaco – songwriter
- Justin Smith – songwriter
- Curtis Mayfield – songwriter
- Just Blaze – producer
- Anthony Kilhoffer – recorder
- Andrew Dawson – recorder
- Mike Dean – mix engineer
- Richard Reitz – assistant engineer
- Matt Green – assistant engineer
- Nate Connelly – assistant engineer
- Mike Mo – assistant engineer
- Vlado Meller – mastering

== Charts ==
=== Weekly charts ===
Chart performance for "Touch the Sky"
Chart (2006)	Peak position
Australia (ARIA)	10
Canada CHR/Pop Top 30 (Radio & Records)	29
Finland (Suomen virallinen lista)	15
Germany (GfK)	97
Ireland (IRMA)	14
New Zealand (Recorded Music NZ)	16
Russia (Tophit)	62
Scottish Singles Sales (Official Charts)	7
UK Singles (Official Charts)	6
UK Hip Hop/R&B (Official Charts)	3
US Billboard Hot 100	42
US Hot R&B/Hip-Hop Songs (Billboard)	23
US Hot Rap Songs (Billboard)	10
US Pop Airplay (Billboard)	35
US Pop 100 (Billboard)	41

=== Year-end charts ===
2006 year-end chart performance for "Touch the Sky"
Chart (2006)	Position
Australia Urban (ARIA)	33
UK Singles (OCC)	93
UK Urban (Music Week)	27

== Certifications ==
Certifications for "Touch the Sky"
Region	Certification	Certified units/sales
Australia (ARIA)	Platinum	70,000^{^}
Denmark (IFPI Danmark)	Gold	45,000^{‡}
New Zealand (RMNZ)	Platinum	30,000^{‡}
United Kingdom (BPI)	2× Platinum	1,200,000^{‡}
United States (RIAA)	Platinum	1,000,000^{‡}
^{^} Shipments figures based on certification alone.^{‡} Sales+streaming figures based on certification alone.

== Release history ==
Release dates and formats for "Touch the Sky"
Region	Date	Format	Label(s)	Ref.
United Kingdom	January 1, 2006	Digital EP	Roc-A-Fella; Def Jam	
United States	February 14, 2006	Mainstream radio	Roc-A-Fella; Def Jam	
Various	March 7, 2006	Digital download	Roc-A-Fella; Def Jam	
United States	April 24, 2006	CD single	Universal	

== See also ==
- List of top 10 singles in 2006 (Australia)
- List of UK top-ten singles in 2006
