= A Neverending Dream =

1996 single by X-Perience

Single by X-Perience

from the album Magic Fields
- Released: August 1996
- Recorded: 1996
- Genre: Eurodance
- Length: 3:28 (radio version); 3:45 (album version)
- Label: WEA/Warner Music
- Songwriters: Matthias Uhle; Alexander Kaiser
- Producers: Bernd Wendlandt; Ingo Politz (Turbobeat Music, Berlin)

X-Perience singles chronology
"Circles of Love" (1996)	"A Neverending Dream" (1996)	"Magic Fields" (1997)

Music video
- "A Neverending Dream" on YouTube

"A Neverending Dream" is a song by German group X-Perience, released in August 1996, by WEA/Warner Music, as the second single from their debut album, Magic Fields (1996). It is written by Matthias Uhle and Alexander Kaiser, and produced by Bernd Wendlandt and Ingo Politz. The song charted in countries like Germany, Hungary and Switzerland, becoming the band's biggest hit. It entered the German Singles Chart at number 91, went to number four in October/November 1996, and spent over 18 weeks in the charts. Over 350,000 copies of the singles were sold in Germany alone and the single was eventually certified Gold. On the Eurochart Hot 100, "A Neverending Dream" reached number 29 in December 1996. Pan-European magazine Music & Media wrote about the song, "The uptempo 'A Neverending Dream', earlier released as a single, is pure pop with a simple synthesizers and dramatic melodies, which is perfect for EHR."

== Track listings ==
- CD single
1. "A Neverending Dream" (Radio Version) – 3:28
2. "A Neverending Dream" (Ambient House Mix) – 4:10
3. "A Neverending Dream" (Extended Version) – 4:26
4. "A Neverending Dream" (Eighties Version) – 3:41
- CD single, remix
1. "A Neverending Dream" (Dance Hall Radio Edit) – 3:46
2. "A Neverending Dream" (Small Town Mix) – 4:15
3. "A Neverending Dream" (Children of the 80's Mix) – 5:52
4. "A Neverending Dream" (Dance Hall Style) – 5:24

== Chart ==
=== Weekly charts ===
Chart (1996–97)	Peak position
Estonia Airplay (Eesti Top 15)	8
Europe (Eurochart Hot 100)	29
Europe (European Dance Radio)	22
Germany (GfK)	4
Hungary (Mahasz)	10
Switzerland (Schweizer Hitparade)	7

=== Year-end charts ===
Chart (1996)	Position
Germany (GfK)	29

== Other versions and remakes ==
On the album Magic Fields, the song has a longer interlude between verse 2 and 3, so this version is 3:45 long. During 1996 and 1997 the band played the song on various television shows. For some reasons, they performed a short version of "A Neverending Dream" sometimes which was only approximately 2:30 long (without the 3rd verse and repeated refrain at the end).

In 2006 the band re-recorded the song on their 4th album Lost in Paradise. José Alvarez-Brill remixed the song. The remake is called "A Neverending Dream" (Alvarez Album Edit) – 3:37. An instrumental version of this 2006 version was used to find a new singer, when Claudia Uhle left the band in July 2007. This was released on the 2007-single "I Feel Like You".

A completely new recorded and composed version of "A Neverending Dream" is released on the album "555". This version (3:31) was released as third single of the album "555" on 3 July 2020. The Deluxe Edition of "555" contains the 1994 Original Demo Version of "A Neverending Dream" (3:17), too.

== Cascada cover ==
"A Neverending Dream"

Single by Cascada

from the album Everytime We Touch
- Released: 4 March 2006 (Germany); 18 June 2007 (UK)
- Recorded: 2005
- Genre: Eurodance
- Length: 3:24
- Label: Zooland
- Songwriters: Matthias Uhle; Alex Kaiser
- Producers: Yann Peifer; Manuel Reuter

Cascada singles chronology
"Truly Madly Deeply" (2006)	"A Neverending Dream" (2006)	"Ready for Love" (2006)

Alternative cover
- UK single cover

In 2006, the song was covered by German dance music act Cascada. This song appears on their 2006 debut album, Everytime We Touch. It was the fifth single released in Germany by Cascada in 2006. It was Cascada's 4th UK single. The video for this song was released on 11 May 2007 on the music channels Fizz and The Box. The music video is strongly themed on Middle Eastern culture with singer Natalie Horler dancing in traditional clothing in front of backdrops like the desert, a typical harem and hammam. Despite a good top 15 position in Ireland, in the UK it charted at No. 46 on its first week of physical release, a big disappointment considering that all previous singles in the UK had gone top 10.

=== Track listings ===
- German 12" maxi single

A-side

1. "A Neverending Dream" [Club Mix] – 4:57

B-side

1. "A Neverending Dream" [The Real Booty Babes Remix] – 5:58
2. "A Neverending Dream" [Deepforces Remix] – 6:09
- UK single
1. "A Neverending Dream" [Acapella]
2. "A Neverending Dream" [Deepforces Remix]
3. "A Neverending Dream" [Dancing DJs Remix]
4. "A Neverending Dream" [Buzz Junkies Remix]
5. "A Neverending Dream" [Digital Dog Remix]
6. "A Neverending Dream" [Frisco Remix]
7. "A Neverending Dream" [KB Project Remix]
8. "A Neverending Dream" [Fugitive Radio Mix]
9. "A Neverending Dream" [Radio Edit]
10. "A Neverending Dream" [Svenson Goes to Love Parade Mix]
- Philippines single
1. "A Neverending Dream" [Svenson Goes to Love Parade Mix]
- Dutch CD single
1. "A Neverending Dream"
2. "Everytime We Touch (Yanou's Candlelight Mix)"
3. "A Neverending Dream" [Svenson Goes to Love Parade Mix]

=== All mixes ===
- A Neverending Dream (Acapella) 3:10
- A Neverending Dream (Buzz Junkies Remix) 6:10
- A Neverending Dream (Cheska Mee, Shinaya, & Maomie Trance Remix) 3:23
- A Neverending Dream (Clubland 11 Remix) 2:44
- A Neverending Dream (Club Mix) 4:58
- A Neverending Dream (Dancing Djs Remix) 5:55
- A Neverending Dream (Dancing Djs Remix 2018) 4:04
- A Neverending Dream (Deep Forces Remix) 6:07
- A Neverending Dream (Deep Forces Remix Cut) 3:13
- A Neverending Dream (Digital Dog Remix) 6:28
- A Neverending Dream (Frisco Remix) 5:29
- A Neverending Dream (Fugitive Remix) 2:45
- A Neverending Dream (Ivan Fillini Remix) 5:25
- A Neverending Dream (KB Project Remix) 6:01
- A Neverending Dream (Radio Edit) 3:23
- A Neverending Dream (Real Booty Babes Remix) 5:58
- A Neverending Dream (Real Booty Babes Remix Edit) 2:55
- A Neverending Dream (ScoopHeadz Remix) 3:23
- A Neverending Dream (ScoopHeadz Extended Remix) 4:09
- A Neverending Dream (Sound DJS Remix) 2:40
- A Neverending Dream (Source Remix) 5:50
- A Neverending Dream (Svenson Goes To Love Parade Mix) 4:59
- A Neverending Dream (Video Edit) 3:10

=== Charts ===
Chart (2007)	Peak Position
Belgium (Ultratop 50 Wallonia)	10
Finland (Suomen virallinen lista)	5
Ireland (IRMA)	15
Netherlands (Single Top 100)	77
Scottish Singles Sales (Official Charts)	10
UK Singles (Official Charts)	46

== Other covers ==
- Trance-X recorded a version in 1996 called “A Neverending Dream (The Dream Dance Anthem Mix) ” – 3:41. It was released on various compilations like “Dream Dance Vol. 3” and “Dream Nation 1” only.
- Mythos N' Watergate recorded a cover version of “A Neverending Dream” in 2002. A music video was also produced.
- Pulsedriver and DJ Fait covered the song in 2016.
- Cascada Remix cover version of “A Neverending Dream (Svenson Goes To The Love Parade Mix)” New Single in 2018. A New Remix is Svenson Goes To The Love Parade Mix
- Cascada Brand New Single of “A Neverending Dream (Svenson Goes To The Love Parade Mix)” New Single in 2018.
- Cascada “A Neverending Dream (Club Mix)” For Mr. & Ms. ST. Therese Eco-Modelo 2018 EcoRamp Music On 25 October 2018 Ramon Magsaysay Hall
- Cascada “A Neverending Dream (Dancing DJs Edit)” [EXCLUSIVE] (Official Music Video) (HD)
- Cascada “A Neverending Dream (Dancing DJs Edit)” New Single On 26 December 2018
- Cascada “A Neverending Dream (ScoopHeadz Remix)” New Single On 30 March 2020
- Scooter track “I Keep Hearing Bingo” from Open Your Mind and Your Trousers album (2024) contains samples from A Neverending Dream.
