= Shine (Shannon Noll song) =

2005 single by Shannon Noll

Single by Shannon Noll

from the album Lift
- B-side: "What Love Is"
- Released: 26 September 2005
- Length: 3:34
- Label: Sony BMG
- Songwriters: Matthew Gerrard; Andy Stochansky
- Producer: Matthew Gerrard

Shannon Noll singles chronology
"C'mon Aussie C'mon" (2004)	"Shine" (2005)	"Lift" (2005)

"Shine" is a song by Australian singer-songwriter Shannon Noll. It was released as the first single from his second studio album, Lift (2005), on 26 September 2005. It debuted at number one on the Australian Singles Chart, giving Noll his third solo number-one single, and earned a platinum sales certification for shipping over 70,000 copies in Australia. In April 2009, the song was released in the United Kingdom, coinciding with Noll's run in the stage version of Jeff Wayne's War of the Worlds.

== Credits and personnel ==
Credits are taken from the Australian CD single liner notes.

Studios

- Mixed at the Ballroom (London, England)
- Mastered at Edensound Mastering (Melbourne, Australia)

Personnel

- Matthew Gerrard – writing, all instruments, production, arrangement
- Andy Stochansky – writing
- Shannon Noll – vocals
- Bryon Jones – vocal production
- Mark Needham – mixing
- Will Brierre – engineering assistant
- Martin Pullan – mastering

== Charts ==
=== Weekly charts ===
Chart (2005)	Peak position
Australia (ARIA)	1

=== Year-end charts ===
Chart (2005)	Position
Australia (ARIA)	35

== Certifications ==
Region	Certification	Certified units/sales
Australia (ARIA)	Platinum	70,000^{^}
^{^} Shipments figures based on certification alone.

== Release history ==
Region	Date	Format(s)	Label(s)	Ref
Australia	26 September 2005	CD	Sony BMG	
United Kingdom	27 April 2009	Promo CDR	RCA	
