= 10 Millionen Partys =

Studio album by Joachim Witt
- Released: 1988
- Studio: Harry Nova, Hamburg; Can Studio, Weilerswist, Cologne; Hotline Studios, Frankfurt
- Genre: Neue Deutsche Welle
- Length: 46:09
- Language: German
- Label: RCA
- Producer: Joachim Witt, Andy Lunn, Peter Hauke

Joachim Witt chronology
Moonlight Nights (1985)	10 Millionen Partys (1988)	Kapitän der Träume (1992)

10 Millionen Partys is the sixth studio album released by Joachim Witt in 1988. It is the first album Witt released after moving to RCA, and sees Witt return to singing German lyrics.

== Critical reception ==
The album follows Witt's unsuccessful attempt on Moonlight Nights to shift audiences toward jazz and swing with lyrics sung in English. Those English lyrics were criticized by German critics as trite, and they felt the same way about the lyrics on this album. The music was described as a mix between Depeche Mode and the Pet Shop Boys. The album did not enjoy commercial success, nor did the three singles it spawned, "Engel sind zart", "Pet Shop Boy" und "Der Tankwart heißt Lou."

== Track listing ==
All tracks composed and arranged by Joachim Witt and Peter Sawatzki-Bär; except where noted.

1. "Der Tankwart heißt Lou" "The Attendant called Lou" (Witt, Frank Dostal, Harald Gutowski, Tassilo Trecker) - 4:17
2. "Engel sind zart" "Angels are tender" (Witt) - 5:01
3. "Auf die Theke, Baby" "At the bar, Baby" (Witt, Frank Dostal, Tassilo Trecker) - 4:02
4. "Reizwort" "Stimulus word" - 4:16
5. "Im Stau" "In the Traffic Jam" - 3:34
6. "Attack" - 3:28
7. "Entertain" (Witt, Vahid Djadda) - 5:40
8. "Pet Shop Boy" - 3:58
9. "Meine Lotion" "My Lotion" - 4:45
10. "Durch die Welt" "Through the World" (Witt, Vahid Djadda; arranged by Helmut Zerlett) - 6:55

== Personnel ==
- Joachim Witt - vocals, guitar, keyboards, programming
- Johan Daansen, Rolf Bussalb - guitar
- Peter Sawatzki-Bär - keyboards, sound effects, programming
- Helmut Zerlett - keyboards, programming
- Andy Lunn - drums, sounds
- Anetta Zalejko, Anja Krenz - vocals, choir
- Marjaleena Jonas - soprano vocals on "Attack" and "Entertain"
