= Lift (Shannon Noll album) =

Studio album by Shannon Noll
- Released: 16 October 2005
- Recorded: 2005
- Genre: Rock, pop
- Length: 45:37
- Label: Sony BMG Australia

Shannon Noll chronology
That's What I'm Talking About (2004)	Lift (2005)	Turn It Up (2007)

Singles from Lift
- 1. "Shine" Released: 26 September 2005; 2. "Lift" Released: 5 December 2005; 3. "Now I Run" Released: 24 April 2006; 4. "Lonely" Released: 28 August 2006

Lift is the second studio album by Australian singer-songwriter Shannon Noll. It was released by Sony BMG in Australia on 16 October 2005. Noll co-wrote eleven out of the thirteen songs in the album. The album debuted at number 1 on the Australian Recording Industry Association album chart on 23 October 2005 with a platinum certification and was eventually certified three times platinum. All four singles released from the album reached the Top 10 of the ARIA single chart, and proved to be very popular radio hits, with both "Shine" and "Now I Run" ending 2006 within the Top 10 most played songs on Australian radio.

Lift was nominated for "Best Pop Release" at the 2006 ARIA awards, the first industry voted nomination for any Australian Idol contestant.

In 2006, the album was re-released with a bonus DVD featuring 4 video clips and a 20-minute documentary.

== Track listing ==
1. "Lift" (Adam Reily/Bryon Jones/Andrew Roachford/Shannon Noll) – 3:56
2. "Shine" (Matthew Gerrard/Andy Stochansky) – 3:34
3. "Give It Away" (Shannon Noll/Peter Gordeno/Gary Clark) – 3:47
4. "Now I Run" (Peter Gordeno/Shannon Noll/Chris Porter) – 3:43
5. "Lonely" (Adam Reily/Shannon Noll) – 4:42
6. "Down on Me" (Phil Buckle/Shannon Noll) – 3:52
7. "Don't Fight It" (Phil Thornalley/Wayne Hector) – 3:45
8. "Losing It All" (Adam Reily/Shannon Noll/David Lesley) – 4:05
9. "All I Want Is More" (Steve Booker/David Nicholas/Michael Stangel/Shannon Noll) – 3:05
10. "This Is It" (Shannon Noll/Wayne Hector/Phil Thornalley) – 3:51
11. "Letter to You" (Paul Wiltshire/Victoria Wu/Adam Gould/Shannon Noll) – 3:42
12. "Everything I Wanted" (Phil Buckle/Shannon Noll) – 4.14
13. "Before We Say Goodbye" (Shannon Noll/Dave Munday/Phil Thornalley) – 3:18

Bonus DVD

1. "Shine" (Video)
2. "Lift" (Video)
3. "Now I Run" (Video)
4. "Lonely" (Video)
5. "Shannon Noll Talks About Lift" (Documentary)

== Charts and certifications ==
=== Weekly charts ===
Chart (2005/06)	Peak position
Australian Albums (ARIA)	1

=== Year-end charts ===
Chart (2005)	Position
Australian Albums Chart	33
Australian Artist Albums Chart	11
Chart (2006)	Position
Australian Albums Chart	22
Australian Artist Albums Chart	11

=== Certifications ===
Region	Certification	Certified units/sales
Australia (ARIA)	3× Platinum	210,000^{^}
^{^} Shipments figures based on certification alone.

== Release history ==
Region	Date	Format(s)	Label	Catalog	Ref.
Australia / New Zealand	16 October 2005	CD; digital download	Sony BMG	82876740522	
Australia	2006	CD / DVD	Sony BMG	88697008752	

== See also ==
- List of number-one albums of 2005 (Australia)
