= A Place I've Never Been =

Studio album by Kate DeAraugo
- Released: 12 December 2005
- Recorded: November–December 2005
- Genres: Pop, pop rock
- Length: 37:52
- Label: Sony/BMG/19
- Producers: Matthew Gerrard, Bryon Jones, Pete Lewinson, Steve Lewinson, Michael Szumowski, Paul Wiltshire, Adam Reily, Victoria Wu

Singles from A Place I've Never Been
- 1. "Maybe Tonight" Released: 27 November 2005; 2. "Faded" Released: 19 February 2006

A Place I've Never Been is the first studio album by Australian Idol series three winner Kate DeAraugo, released in Australia by Sony/BMG Australia as well as 19 Recordings on 12 December 2005 (see 2005 in music). DeAraugo chose the album title from album track "The Most Beautiful Place" which is her favourite song from the album. The album has a mixture of genre between pop rock and ballad songs – some written by Brooke McClymont, Jewel Kilcher and The Veronicas. A cover version of the Bryan Adams song "Heaven" was featured on the album. The singles released from the album "Maybe Tonight" and "Faded" became top ten hits on the Australian ARIA Singles Chart.

The singles released from A Place I've Never Been were successful in DeAraugo's home country Australia. "Maybe Tonight", the first single released, was the "Winner's Single" of season three of Australian Idol, where DeAraugo came first place. It debuted at number-one on the Australian ARIA Singles Chart with sales of 20,307 copies and was nominated for "Highest Selling Single" at the 2006 ARIA Awards. The album's second single, "Faded", became a hit making it DeAraugo's second top ten single. It went to spend twenty-four weeks in the top one hundred.

A Place I've Never Been had overall commercial success in Australia. In mid December 2005, it debuted at number ten on the Australian ARIA Albums Chart with sales of 15,683 copies. The album's second week on the chart saw it fall twelve spots to number twenty-two. It went on to spend eight weeks in the top fifty rising twice up the chart and spent nineteen weeks in the top one hundred. The Australian Recording Industry Association awarded the album a platinum certification for shipping 70,000 copies and it became the ninetieth highest selling album in Australia for 2006.

Promotion for the album included live performances, instore appearances and guest appearances. DeAraugo performed the album's lead single, "Maybe Tonight", on the Australian morning show Sunrise on 2 December 2005 which was held at Martin Place, Sydney. She also performed at the Australia Day Eve celebration with the Rogue Traders at the lawns of the Parliament House, Canberra on 25 January 2006. Some instore appearances DeAraugo attended to includes: Myer City Store Miss Shop in Sydney on 11 December 2005; Pacific Fair, Gold Coast on 15 December 2005 and Myer Lonsdale Store in Melbourne on 17 December 2005. DeAraugo was also a guest on the ABC music quiz show Spicks and Specks on 15 February 2006, the first episode of the show that was aired in 2006.

== Track listing ==
1. "Faded" (Matthew Gerrard, Robbie Nevil, Jessica Origliasso, Lisa Origliasso) – 3:30
2. "Maybe Tonight" (Dave Bassett, Jess Cates, Lindy Robbins) – 3:38
3. "Heaven" (Bryan Adams, Jim Vallance) – 4:07
4. "World Stands Still" (Andy Love, Steve Lewinson, Pete Lewinson) – 3:58
5. "Famous for Leaving" (Andrew Dodd, Brooke McClymont, Adam Watts) – 4:15
6. "If This Is Love" (Guy Chambers, Kara DioGuardi, Jewel Kilcher) – 3:44
7. "Victim" (Dave Anthony, Adam Reily) – 2:47
8. "It's Obvious" (Glenn Cunningham, Carmen Smith) – 3:56
9. "You Brought the Sunshine" (Cunningham) – 4:12
10. "The Most Beautiful Place" (Robbins, Cates, Tom Leanard) – 3:59

== Charts ==
Chart (2005)	Peak position
Australian ARIA Albums Chart	10

=== Year-End charts ===
Chart (2006)	Peak position
Australian ARIA Albums Chart	90

== Personnel ==
The following people contributed to A Place I've Never Been:

- Greg Critchley – drum (track 1).
- Sam Dixon – bass (track 2).
- Matthew Gerrard – bass, guitar, keyboard (track 1).
- Dave Leslie – electric guitar (track 2), guitar (track 1).
- Brooke McClymont – background vocals (track 1).
- Rod McCormack – acoustic guitar (track 2).
- Carmen Smith – background vocals (tracks 1 and 2).
- Juanita Tippens – background vocals (track 2).
