= Lift (Shannon Noll song) =

2005 single by Shannon Noll

Single by Shannon Noll

from the album Lift
- Released: 5 December 2005
- Length: 4:19
- Label: Sony BMG
- Songwriters: Shannon Noll; Andrew Roachford; Bryon Jones; Adam Reily
- Producers: Bryon Jones; Adam Reily

Shannon Noll singles chronology
"Shine" (2005)	"Lift" (2005)	"Now I Run" (2006)

"Lift" is the second single from Australian singer Shannon Noll's second album, Lift (2005). The song debuted at number 13 on the Australian Singles Chart and eventually peaked at number 10 for two weeks. The boxing-themed video clip for this song was shot in an unused warehouse in Sydney's Marrickville by Australian director Anthony Rose, who also directed Noll's music videos for "Drive", "What About Me" and "Shine".

== Track listings ==
CD single

1. "Lift" (single version) – 4:19
2. "Lift" (album version) – 3:56
3. "Lift" (music video)
4. "Shine" (music video)

Digital single

1. "Lift" (single version) – 4:19
2. "Lift" (album version) – 3:56

== Charts ==
=== Weekly charts ===
Chart (2006)	Peak position
Australia (ARIA)	10

=== Year-end charts ===
Chart (2006)	Position
Australia (ARIA)	43

== Certifications ==
Region	Certification	Certified units/sales
Australia (ARIA)	Gold	35,000^{^}
^{^} Shipments figures based on certification alone.
