= Miracle (Cascada song) =

2004 single by Cascada

Single by Cascada

from the album Everytime We Touch
- Released: 23 November 2004
- Recorded: 2004
- Genre: Eurodance
- Length: 3:38
- Label: Zooland
- Songwriters: Yann Peifer; Manuel Reuter
- Producers: Yanou; DJ Manian

Cascada singles chronology
"Miracle" (2004)	"Everytime We Touch" (2005)

Audio
- "Miracle" on YouTube

"Miracle" (also titled as "(I Need a) Miracle") is the debut single by German Eurodance trio Cascada. It was written by Yann Peifer and Manuel Reuter, who also produced the song under their production names Yanou and DJ Manian, for the group's first studio album Everytime We Touch (2006). It was released as the album's first single on 23 November 2004 through Zooland Records. It was later released internationally in association with other dance music labels including Robbins Entertainment and All Around The World and Universal Music Group. Musically, the song runs through a Eurodance beat with Europop lyrics.

The song was met with generally positive reviews from critics, with the majority of them praising its Europop sound. "Miracle" has enjoyed chart success in many countries. The song attained top-ten positions in European countries, reaching the summit of the SNEP chart in France and number four on the IRMA chart in Ireland. The song charted on the Billboard Bubbling Under Hot 100 at number six, remaining as the lowest-peaking song from the album. The accompanying music video portrays lead singer Natalie Horler singing on stage with digital surroundings. As of 24 January 2025, an original MV of this song uploaded to YouTube in 2006 has accumulated 41,922,128 views.

== Background ==
"Miracle", also known as "(I Need a) Miracle" is the first single released from the first studio album Everytime We Touch (2006), by the German dance recording trio, Cascada. It was written and produced by the trio's two disc jockeys, Yann Peifer and Manuel Reuter. The song was recorded in 2004 and released under the moniker Cascade. The group was eventually notified that American disc jockey Kaskade threatened to sue for ownership of the name and soon after changed their name to Cascada, which is Spanish for "waterfall". It was released for airplay in Germany and gained popularity in the club scene. The single was released on 23 November 2004 as a maxi single, featuring remixes. After the popularity of the album's third single, Everytime We Touch, the song was re-released in America and later on internationally.

It was released on 29 January 2007 in the Czech Republic as a digital single, featuring the original mix and the extended version. In France, the song was released as an extended play on 5 March 2007, featuring the S.A.D. Radio Mix and the Icarus Remix. The song, as "(I Need a) Miracle", was released with Bad Boy as a maxi single on 4 September 2006, featuring the radio mix and the extended version as well as various mixes of "Bad Boy", by Balloon Records. Andorfine Records released an extended play on 22 June 2007 featuring the 2007 radio edit of the song along with club edits and a song from the Everytime We Touch album, "Another You".

== Composition ==
"Miracle" is an uptempo song that runs for three minutes and thirty eight seconds. It maintains the characteristics of electronic dance music, making use of kickdrums, synthesizers, and a drum machine. The song features a dance interlude that begins after the song's chorus ends. It is composed in a key signature of D minor. The remixes on the album range in sound from different electronic dance subgenres. The Sad Radio and Extended Mix uses the same elements of the original single's sound but features an overall harder sound. The Icarus Mix makes use of a characteristic hard trance sound. Natalie Horler's vocal range spans 1 octave and 2 notes, from F3 to A4.

== Reception ==
Joey Rivaldo of About.com rated the song three and a half stars (out of five), praising the song's "Hard pounding beats, cool breakdowns and a strong vocal". He further commented that "All around this a solid tune that will keep strong at a steady pace on all levels.". Sharon Mawer of All Music Guide named "Miracle" as one of the best tracks on the album in her review of the song's parent album, Everytime We Touch.

"Miracle" was well received on the charts, with most of the chart climbing occurring during 2006 to 2007. The song appeared on the Ö3 Austria Top 75 on the chart's issue date of 26 May 2004, charting at number fifty-eight. The second week on the chart saw the song climb thirty-four places to number twenty-four, its highest peak on the chart. It lasted nine more weeks after, leaving the chart at number seventy-five on the chart issue date of 25 July 2007. "Miracle" debuted high on the Swedish pop charts at number eleven. It fell next week to number eighteen and stayed there for another week before falling four places to twenty-two. In its next week, the song logged its highest peak at number ten in its fifth and eighth week on the chart. In Ireland, the song logged twenty consecutive weeks on the charts, peaking at number four in its seventh week and logging four non-consecutive weeks within the top ten positions. "Miracle" charted for a moderate amount of time in the United Kingdom and the Netherlands, logging between eleven and twelve weeks on the chart starting in mid-February 2007. It logged three non-consecutive weeks in its peak position of number six on the Dutch Top 40 and one week at its peak of number eight on the UK Singles Chart. The song lasted a total of six weeks within the top ten in the Netherlands. In France, the song charted most successfully, logging its first four weeks at number two. The song reached the summit of the SNEP chart in its fifth week. It continued its chart run for twenty-three more weeks, lasting within the top ten for four more weeks. It exited the chart on the week after the chart issue date of 29 September 2007, exiting at number ninety-seven. The song charted poorly in Switzerland, lasting one week on the chart at number eighty-five.

== Credits and personnel ==
- Natalie Horler – vocals
- Yann Peifer - songwriting, production, programming, instrumentation
- Manuel Reuter - songwriting, production, programming, instrumentation

Credits are taken from Everytime We Touch liner notes.

== Formats and track listings ==
- Original version (2004)
1. "Miracle" [Radio Mix] – 3:38
2. "Miracle" [SAD Radio Mix] – 3:26
3. "Miracle" [Extended Mix] – 6:08
4. "Miracle" [Icarus Mix] – 6:58
- U.S. version (2004)
1. "Miracle" [Radio Mix] – 3:38
2. "Miracle" [SAD Radio Mix] – 3:26
3. "Miracle" [Extended Mix] – 6:08
4. "Miracle" [Icarus Mix] – 6:58
5. "Miracle" [SAD Extended Mix] – 7:08
- Poland release single (2004)
1. "(I Need A) Miracle" (Radio Mix) - 3:41
2. "(I Need A) Miracle" (SAD Radio Mix) - 3:26
3. "(I Need A) Miracle" (Extended Mix) - 6:11
4. "(I Need A) Miracle" (Icarus Mix) - 7:04
5. "(I Need A) Miracle" (SAD Extended Mix) - 7:09
- U.S. re-release version (2006)
1. "Miracle" [Radio Mix] – 3:38
2. "Miracle" [US Radio Mix] – 3:25
3. "Miracle" [SAD Radio Mix] – 3:26
4. "Miracle" [Extended Mix] – 6:08
5. "Miracle" [USA Extended Mix] – 5:05
6. "Miracle" [Icarus Mix] – 6:58
7. "Miracle" [SAD Extended Mix] – 7:08
- Poland re-release single (2006)
1. "Miracle" (US Radio Edit) - 3:27
2. "Miracle" (Alex M Radio Edit) - 3:41
3. "Miracle" (Radio Edit 2004) - 3:45
4. "Miracle" (US Club Mix) - 5:08
5. "Miracle" (Alex M Extended Remix) - 6:48
6. "Miracle" (Extended Mix) - 6:13
- Czech Republic single
1. "Miracle" (Radio Edit) - 3:37
2. "Miracle" (Extended Version) - 6:07
- Dutch re-release single
1. "Miracle" [Radio Version] – 3:39
2. "Miracle" [Extended Version] – 6:07
- Spain release single
1. "Miracle" [Radio Mix] – 3:38
2. "Miracle" [SAD Radio Mix] – 3:26
3. "Miracle" [Extended Mix] – 6:08
4. "Miracle" [Icarus Mix] – 6:58
5. "Miracle" [After Dark Version] – 3:10
6. "Miracle" [Video Edit] – 3:38
7. "Miracle" [Video] – 3:40
- UK (2007)

CD 1

1. "Miracle" [Radio Edit] – 2:46
2. "Miracle" [After Dark Version] – 3:10

CD 2: Enhanced

1. "Miracle" [Radio Edit] – 2:46
2. "Miracle" [Original Mix] – 6:07
3. "Miracle" [Socialites Mix] – 6:50
4. "Miracle" [Alex M Extended Remix] – 6:44
5. "Miracle" [Northstarz Remix] – 6:12
6. "Miracle" [Joey Riot Mix] – 6:28
7. "Miracle" [Video Edit] – 3:38
8. "Miracle" [Video] – 3:40
- France EP
1. "Miracle" (Radio Edit) - 2:59
2. "Miracle" (Extended Version) - 6:07
3. "Miracle" (S.A.D Radio Mix) - 3:24
4. "Miracle" (Icarus Remix) - 6:58

== Charts ==
=== Weekly charts ===
Chart (2004–2007)	Peak position
Austria (Ö3 Austria Top 40)	57
Belgium (Ultratip Bubbling Under Flanders)	9
Belgium (Ultratop 50 Wallonia)	20
CIS Airplay (TopHit)	26
Europe (Eurochart Hot 100)	4
France (SNEP)	1
Germany (GfK)	32
Ireland (IRMA)	4
Netherlands (Dutch Top 40)	6
Netherlands (Single Top 100)	8
Russia Airplay (TopHit)	22
Scotland Singles (Official Charts)	2
Sweden (Sverigetopplistan)	10
Switzerland (Schweizer Hitparade)	85
UK Singles (Official Charts)	8
US Bubbling Under Hot 100 (Billboard)	6
US Dance Airplay (Billboard)	8

=== Year-end charts ===
Chart (2006)	Position
Sweden (Hitlistan)	38

Chart (2007)	Position
Europe (Eurochart Hot 100)	43
France (SNEP)	16
CIS (TopHit)	72
Netherlands (Dutch Top 40)	43
Netherlands (Single Top 100)	58
Russia Airplay (TopHit)	63
UK Singles (OCC)	91

== Certifications ==
Region	Certification	Certified units/sales
Finland (Musiikkituottajat)	Gold	6,865
France (SNEP)	Gold	200,000^{*}
United Kingdom (BPI)	Silver	200,000^{‡}
United States (RIAA)	Gold	500,000^{*}
^{*} Sales figures based on certification alone.^{‡} Sales+streaming figures based on certification alone.

== Release history ==
Release dates and formats for "Miracle"
Region	Date	Format	Label(s)	Ref.
United States	May 8, 2006	Mainstream airplay	Robbins	
