= Claudia Uhle =

German singer (born 1976)

- Also known as: Angelzoom
- Born: March 15, 1976; Johannisthal, East Berlin, East Germany
- Genres: Pop
- Occupation: Singer
- Instruments: Vocals; Flute; Piano
- Years active: 1995–2007, 2020–present
- Member of: X-Perience

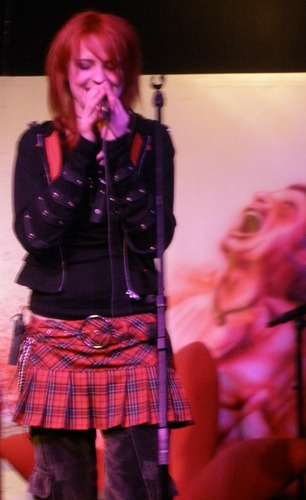
Claudia Uhle in 2011.

Claudia Uhle (born 15 March 1976) is a German singer, known for being a member of X-Perience.

== Early life ==
Uhle was born in Johannisthal in East Berlin. She first learned the flute and the piano before practicing singing. She attended the Georg-Friedrich-Händel-Oberschule in Berlin, a special music school. During school she sang in various choirs, as a teenager she sang at the Berlin State Opera.

== Career ==
In 1995, Uhle joined the pop group X-Perience, in which her brother Matthias was already playing. The band found success in 1996 with the song "A Neverending Dream".

In 2007, Uhle left the band to focus on her solo project, Angelzoom. In 2020, she rejoined X-Perience.

== Discography ==
=== Albums ===
- 2004: Angelzoom
- 2010: Nothing is Infinite

=== Singles ===
- 2004: Fairyland
- 2005: Back in the Moment (feat. Joachim Witt)
- 2010: The Things You Said
- 2011: Everyone Cares
- 2013: A Lily of the Valley
- 2014: Lascia Ch'io Pianga - The Dark Tenor
