= Lonely (Shannon Noll song) =

2006 single by Shannon Noll

Single by Shannon Noll

from the album Lift
- B-side: "Now I Run" (acoustic)
- Released: 28 August 2006
- Length: 4:42
- Label: Sony BMG
- Songwriters: Adam Reily; Shannon Noll
- Producers: Bryon Jones; Adam Reily

Shannon Noll singles chronology
"Now I Run" (2006)	"Lonely" (2006)	"Don't Give Up" (2006)

"Lonely" is the fourth single from Australian singer Shannon Noll's second album, Lift. Co-written by Noll and Adam Reily, the single was released on 28 August 2006. It peaked at number eight on the Australian Singles Chart. The single features an acoustic version of Noll's previous single, "Now I Run".

== Music video ==
The single's video was directed by Anthony Rose. The clip was shot in Sydney at the Star City Showroom as a live clip during Shannon Noll's Now I Run Tour in July 2006. The video follows Noll in his hotel room and travelling in the streets in a cab on his way to the gig.

== Track listing ==
Australian CD single

1. "Lonely" (radio mix) – 4:44
2. "Lonely" – 4:43
3. "Now I Run" (acoustic) – 3:48

== Charts ==
=== Weekly charts ===
Chart (2006)	Peak position
Australia (ARIA)	8

=== Year-end charts ===
Chart (2006)	Position
Australia (ARIA)	59
