= Faded (Kate DeAraugo song) =

2006 single by Kate DeAraugo

Single by Kate DeAraugo

from the album A Place I've Never Been
- B-side: "World Stands Still"
- Released: 20 February 2006
- Length: 3:30
- Label: Sony BMG
- Songwriter(s): Matthew Gerrard, Jessica Origliasso, Lisa Origliasso, Robbie Nevil
- Producer(s): Matthew Gerrard, Bryon Jones

Kate DeAraugo singles chronology
"Maybe Tonight" (2005)	"Faded" (2006)	"It's True" (2015)

"Faded" is a song written by Matthew Gerrard, Jessica Origliasso, Lisa Origliasso, and Robbie Nevil, produced by Gerrard and Bryon Jones for Australian singer Kate DeAraugo's first album A Place I've Never Been (2005). It was released as the album's second single in Australia on 20 February 2006 as a CD single. Two of the song's co-writers—Jessica and Lisa Origliasso of the Veronicas—recorded a demo of "Faded" prior to DeAraugo's release. They have been known to perform the song live.

"Faded" was DeAraugo's second top-10 single following her number-one hit "Maybe Tonight" after winning series three of Australian Idol. DeAraugo went on to achieve two other top-10 singles with girl group the Young Divas. In 2008, the song was released as a single by German dance music act Cascada from their second studio album, Perfect Day (2007).

== Music video ==
The video begins with DeAraugo in her car with a photograph of her partner, The words "FADED" appear in the shadow of underneath her car. As the chorus begins, we see her performing the song in a large warehouse with her band. She then texts her boyfriend "Can you come over?", who we see stumbling down an alley in the presumption he is drunk, checking out another woman. After she receives the text, he drives to the same warehouse and opens the door to find photos of him with other women scattered all over the floor, with the words "Cheat", "Liar", "Coward", "Fake", "Two Timer", and "User" put over his face. He then runs out, and upon trying to leave his car won't start, leaving him stranded there.

== Track listing ==
1. "Faded" – 3:31
2. "Faded (Reactor mix)" – 3:40
3. "Faded (Chameleon mix)" – 4:59
4. "World Stands Still" – 3:56

== Charts ==
=== Weekly charts ===
Chart (2006)	Peak position
Australia (ARIA)	8

=== Year-end charts ===
Chart (2006)	Position
Australia (ARIA)	66

== Cascada cover ==
"Faded"

Single by Cascada

from the album Perfect Day
- Released: 26 August 2008
- Genre: Dance-pop; Eurodance
- Length: 2:48
- Label: Robbins Entertainment (US)
- Songwriter(s): Matthew Gerrard; Jessica Origliasso; Lisa Origliasso; Robbie Nevil
- Producer(s): Yanou; DJ Manian

Cascada singles chronology
"Because The Night" (2008)	"Faded" (2008)	"Perfect Day" (2009)

Audio video
- "Faded" on YouTube

German Eurodance group Cascada covered the song on their American/Canadian release of their album Perfect Day. In the U.S. "Faded" was digitally released on 5 August 2008 and then released on a CD Maxi 26 August 2008. Although the song did not receive much attention on United States charts, it did rank as No. 55 on New York's Radio Station Z100's Top 100 Songs of 2008. The track was also released in certain European countries such as Finland and Germany as a digital download in 2010.

=== Formats and track listing ===
United States

1. "Faded" (Album Version) – 2:50
2. "Faded" (Dave Ramone Electro Club Edit) – 2:57
3. "Faded" (Wideboys Electro Radio Edit) – 2.36
4. "Faded" (Dave Ramone Pop Radio Mix) – 2:54
5. "Faded" (Album Extended Version) – 4:26
6. "Faded" (Dave Ramone Electro Club Extended) – 6:25
7. "Faded" (Wideboys Electro Club Mix) – 6:07
8. "Faded" (Dave Ramone Pop Extended Mix) – 5:51
9. "Faded" (Lior Magal Remix) – 5:27
10. "Faded" (Giuseppe D's Dark Fader Club Mix) – 7:20

Europe

1. "Faded" (Radio Edit) – 2:48
2. "Faded" (Wideboys Radio Edit) – 2:36
3. "Faded" (Extended Mix) – 4:24
4. "Faded" (Dave Ramone Remix) – 5.48

France

1. "Faded" (Wideboys Miami House Mix) – 6:04

=== Charts ===
Chart (2008)	Peak position
Czech Republic (Rádio – Top 100)	49
US Dance Airplay (Billboard)	7

=== Release history ===
Region	Date
United States	26 August 2008
France	27 October 2008
