= Maybe Tonight =

2005 Australian Idol winner's single

Single by Kate DeAraugo

from the album A Place I've Never Been
- B-side: "Ironic" (live)
- Released: 28 November 2005
- Recorded: 2005
- Studio: Eargasm (Sydney)
- Length: 3:37
- Label: Sony BMG
- Songwriters: Dave Bassett; Jess Cates; Lindy Robbins
- Producers: Bryon Jones; Adam Reily

Kate DeAraugo singles chronology
"Maybe Tonight" (2005)	"Faded" (2006)

"Maybe Tonight" is a pop song written by Dave Bassett, Jess Cates and Lindy Robbins, produced by Bryon Jones and Adam Reily for Kate DeAraugo's first album A Place I've Never Been (2005). It was released as the album's first single on 28 November 2005 and was successful in her home country of Australia, becoming her first number-one hit.

== Music video ==
The video opens with DeAraugo staring out her bedroom window in the rain, before it cuts away to a shot of a young couple (DeAraugo and her partner in the past), sitting on a motel roof with an umbrella. The video continues to cut between the present and the past, until we see her partner in the present with his car broken down, then we see the young couple where the male has fallen of his bike and hurt his knee, then they kiss. DeAraugo's partner then tries to ring her on his mobile phone, however he drops it and it breaks apart, while at the same time she just tried to call him. The video continues to cut between the young couple, and DeAraugo waiting for her boyfriend, who is running in the street to her, and we then see she is staying at the same motel we saw the young couple in. DeAraugo is also seen in a glamorous brown dress with shoulder-length earrings, as well as a black dress, in front of a backdrop of paintings. Her partner finally arrives at her motel while she is reminiscing, and they embrace as the video fades out.

== Promotion and chart performance ==
The song was the most added song to radio in Australia the week before its release on 28 November 2005. DeAraugo made an appearance on the Australian morning show Sunrise on 2 December 2005 performing the song live and she made in-store appearances to sign the single in Sydney, Melbourne and the Gold Coast. The CD maxi single featured the song along with a cover of the Alanis Morissette song "Ironic" she performed live on Australian Idol's "Up Close & Personal" special. "Maybe Tonight" reached number fifteen on the national Australian airplay chart.

The song debuted on the Australian ARIA Singles Chart on 5 December 2005 at the number-one position with 20,307 copies sold and was certified platinum by ARIA. It peaked at number one for two weeks. The song was nominated for an ARIA Award for "Highest-Selling Single" for 2006 and was the 51st-highest-selling single for 2005 and 49th for 2006.

== Charts ==
=== Weekly charts ===
Chart (2005)	Peak position
Australia (ARIA)	1

=== Year-end charts ===
Chart (2005)	Position
Australia (ARIA)	51
Chart (2006)	Position
Australia (ARIA)	49

== Certifications ==
Region	Certification	Certified units/sales
Australia (ARIA)	Platinum	70,000^{^}
^{^} Shipments figures based on certification alone.
