= Now I Run =

2006 single by Shannon Noll

Single by Shannon Noll

from the album Lift
- B-side: "What Does It Do to Your Heart"; "I'll Be Around"
- Released: 24 April 2006
- Length: 3:42
- Label: Sony BMG
- Songwriters: Chris Porter; Shannon Noll; Peter Gordeno
- Producers: Bryon Jones; Adam Reily

Shannon Noll singles chronology
| "Lift" (2005) | "Now I Run" (2006) | "Lonely" (2006) |

"Now I Run" is a song by Australian singer Shannon Noll. Released in April 2006, it was the third single from his second album, Lift (2005). The song was praised by music critics, with influential Australian music reviewer Cameron Adams naming "Now I Run" as one of his top singles of 2006, describing it as "So soaked in raw emotion you can imagine the goose bumps on his arms as he's singing".

Commercially, the single peaked at number six on the Australian Singles Chart. Noll performed the song during a special episode of the Nine Network's The Footy Show in Beaconsfield, Tasmania, to celebrate the rescue of trapped miners Todd Russell and Brant Webb. B-side "What Does It Do to Your Heart" was later included on Noll's UK debut album, What Matters the Most (2009).

== Track listings ==
Australian CD single and digital download EP

1. "Now I Run" – 3:44
2. "What Does It Do to Your Heart" – 3:16
3. "I'll Be Around" – 3:29

== Charts ==
| Chart (2006) | Peak position |
|---|---|
| Australia (ARIA) | 6 |
