= Kate DeAraugo =

Australian singer (born 1985)

- Born: Katherine Jenna DeAraugo; 5 November 1985 (age 40); Melbourne, Victoria, Australia
- Origin: Bendigo, Victoria, Australia
- Genres: Pop rock, pop
- Occupations: Singer, songwriter
- Instrument: Vocals
- Years active: 2003–present
- Labels: Sony BMG (2005–2008); Indie (2009–2017)
- Formerly of: Young Divas
- Website: katedearaugo.com.au

Katherine Jenna DeAraugo (/dəˈruːʒ/ də-ROOZH; born 5 November 1985) is an Australian singer-songwriter who in 2005 was the third winner of Australian Idol. After Idol, DeAraugo signed to Sony BMG and released her debut single, "Maybe Tonight", in November 2005. The single debuted at Number 1 on the ARIA Charts and was certified platinum. Her debut album, A Place I've Never Been, was released in December 2005 and was also certified platinum. DeAraugo later became a member of the multi-platinum-selling girl group Young Divas, which disbanded in 2008.

== Australian Idol ==
A former swimming teacher, DeAraugo had auditioned for Australian Idol in both the first season and in the second season, both times failing to make it past the auditions. After this, she travelled from Bendigo, Victoria, to the Gold Coast, Queensland, for singing lessons with Venetta Fields, finally moving to Queensland, where she auditioned for the third season of Idol in 2005.

On 14 November 2005, DeAraugo beat Lee Harding to ensure her place in the grand final. Her father, a businessman and car dealer in her hometown of Bendigo orchestrated a publicity campaign with "Vote for Kate" stickers and buttons appearing all over central Victoria. DeAraugo's co-finalist was Emily Williams, making this the first all-female final since the show began in 2003. Williams was generally considered the favourite, but, on 21 November 2005, DeAraugo was crowned as the third Australian Idol winner with a vote that is still the closest in the show's history. She defeated Williams by only 2%. She was the only Australian Idol winner not to have earned a single touchdown from judge Mark Holden throughout the course of the show. She was also never placed in any week's bottom group.

Idol performances
- Brisbane Auditions: "Young Hearts Run Free" by Kym Mazelle (Advanced)
- Theatre Round Day Two: "Finally" by CeCe Peniston (Advanced)
- Top 30 (Group 2): "For Once in My Life" by Stevie Wonder (Advanced)
- Top 13 Australian Made: "Please Don't Ask Me" by John Farnham (Safe)
- Top 11 '60s Hits: "Rescue Me" by Fontella Bass (Safe)
- Top 10 Supergroups: "I Want It All" by Queen (Safe)
- Top 9 Idols' Choice: "Not That Kind" by Anastacia (Safe)
- Top 8 Big Band Hits: "Cry Me a River" by Patti Austin (Safe)
- Top 7 '80s Hits: "Ain't Nobody" by Chaka Khan (Safe)
- Top 6 Up Close & Personal: "Ironic" by Alanis Morissette (Safe)
- Top 6 Motown Hits: "I Wish" by Stevie Wonder (Safe)
- Top 5 '70s Hits: "Lady Marmalade" by Patti LaBelle (Safe)
- Top 4 Elvis Hits: "The Impossible Dream" by Elvis Presley (Safe)
- Top 4 Elvis Hits: "Burning Love" by Elvis Presley (Safe)
- Top 3 #1 Hits: "Heaven" by Bryan Adams (Safe)
- Top 3 #1 Hits: "Like a Prayer" by Madonna (Safe)
- Top 2 Idols' Choice: "Shackles (Praise You)" by Mary Mary (Winner)
- Top 2 Idols' Choice: "How Could an Angel Break My Heart" by Toni Braxton (Winner)
- Top 2 Winner's Single: "Maybe Tonight" by the Australian Idol 2005 (Winner)
- Grand Final Performance: "The Impossible Dream" by Elvis Presley - Declared 3rd Australian Idol

== Music career ==
=== 2005–2006: A Place I've Never Been ===
As the winner of Australian Idol in 2005, DeAraugo was sent to the studio to work on her debut album, which took six days to record. She released her debut single, "Maybe Tonight", on 27 November 2005. With sales of 20,307 copies. It debuted at number one and stayed there for two weeks and was awarded a platinum award by the Australian Recording Industry Association (ARIA). The single stayed in the top 50 for 13 weeks, and the music video was popular on Australian music video shows such as Video Hits and Rage. In September 2006, "Maybe Tonight" was nominated for an ARIA Award for "Highest Selling Single", but it lost to "Flaunt It" by TV Rock.

DeAraugo released her debut album, A Place I've Never Been, on 12 December 2005 through Sony BMG. The album debuted at number 10 on the Australian ARIA Albums Chart, with 15,600 copies sold in its first week. The album stayed in the Top 50 chart for eight weeks and on the chart for 19 weeks. It was certified platinum in its first week. DeAraugo's second single, "Faded", was released on 19 February 2006 and was co-written by Australian pop-rock duo the Veronicas. "Faded" debuted at number eight on the Australian ARIA Singles Chart and number three on the Australasian charts. It stayed in the Top 100 chart for 24 weeks.

=== 2006–2007: Young Divas ===
DeAraugo joined three other Australian Idol contestants, Emily Williams, Ricki-Lee Coulter, and Paulini, for a national tour. To promote the tour, the four released a cover of a Donna Summer hit classic, "This Time I Know It's for Real", under the name of Young Divas. The single was released on 6 May 2006 and debuting at number seven and peaking at number two. It went platinum and was in the Top 30 charts for 24 weeks. Originally a music video was not to be included but, after much demand and the popularity of the single, a music video was released. The group appeared on television shows such as Sunrise and the Australian version of Dancing with the Stars to also promote the single and tour. The Young Divas' tour was very popular, and more shows had to be added than originally planned.

As the single and tour had been so popular, the Young Divas recorded an album of remakes of classics. Young Divas, their self-titled debut album, was released on 18 November 2006 and debuted at number four on the Australian ARIA Albums Chart. Their second single, "Happenin' All over Again" (a cover of Lonnie Gordon's disco classic), peaked at number nine. The group members stated many times that they would also keep their solo careers, and DeAraugo announced in Australian magazine Woman's Day that she was currently working on her second solo album.

DeAraugo and her fellow Divas then recorded a song called "2000 Miles" for the compilation album Home: Songs of Hope & Journey by various Australian artists to raise funds and bring attention to beyondblue, an Australian initiative against depression. For this campaign, DeAraugo gained honorary membership of The Coterie in the 2007 membership list. On 22 June 2007, it was announced that Ricki-Lee Coulter had decided to leave the group in order to focus on her solo career following rumours of infighting. DeAraugo and the other two remaining group members stated that they would carry on with their plan to record a second album, which they hoped to release in November of the same year.

=== 2007–2008: New Attitude and group disbandment ===
On 26 September 2007, DeAraugo appeared alongside the group members on the top 12 nights of the fifth season of Australian Idol. It was during this performance that season four runner-up, Jessica Mauboy, was revealed as the new Young Diva, replacing Ricki-Lee Coulter. The group performed "When You Believe," which was originally sung by Mariah Carey and Whitney Houston for the 40th anniversary of Channel 7's Telethon Western Australia.

On 9 October 2007, they appeared on an Australian Idol special named Doing It For the Kids and revealed that the name of their second album would be New Attitude. On 22 October, they appeared on Australian Idol season five for a third time when they performed their new single, "Turn Me Loose", along with New Zealand rapper Savage who is featured on the track. The single was officially released on 17 November 2007 and peaked at number 15 on the ARIA singles chart. The Divas' second album followed on 26 November, peaked at number 10, and was certified gold for sales of 35,000 copies. On the season five finale of Australian Idol, when Natalie Gauci was declared the winner, the group performed their single "Turn Me Loose" for a second time with Savage.

On 28 March 2008, after three months of apparent inactivity, the Young Divas' record label, Sony BMG, announced in The Daily Telegraph that, due to the underperformance of "Turn Me Loose", no second single would be released from New Attitude. However, it was also stated that the group was not being dropped from the record label's artist roster.

After months of speculation, it was officially announced on 24 August 2008 that founding Young Divas member Paulini and new member Jessica Mauboy had both decided to leave the group in order to concentrate on their solo careers. The move meant that DeAraugo and Emily Williams became the only remaining members of the Young Divas, though their manager David Champion stressed that the group's career was not over and a third line-up would appear after a hiatus. This was proven to be wrong when both Williams and DeAraugo resumed their solo careers in 2009.

=== 2008–present: second studio album and Excess Baggage ===
DeAraugo spent the remainder of 2008 writing and recording material for her second solo album, following her 2005 debut, A Place I've Never Been. Since the Young Divas disbanded, DeAraugo had been performing in clubs across Australia. She hoped to release her second studio album in August 2010, saying, "Basically, the album will be about what I have been through in the past few years. You know the sort of thing - relationships, the ups and downs of life. Some of it has been very public."

In November 2011, in an interview regarding full-body liposuction, DeAraugo admitted that her second album had been completed yet was held back from release, blaming it on her body image. In February 2012, DeAraugo was featured on the Nine Network weight-loss reality show Excess Baggage, along with other well-known people such as Kevin Federline and Christine Anu. According to her biography on the official Excess Baggage website, DeAraugo was still working on her second album.

In February 2015, DeAraugo released a new track as part of the digital-only soundtrack for the film Dinosaur Island. In April 2015, she announced that a new single, called "Shut Your Mouth", would be released on 1 May that year. The track was co-written by DNA Songs and deals with emergence from a dark period in her life. "There was a bit of anger and resentment in the mood", she said of the recording process, "But above all, it's about empowerment."

== Personal life ==
In early January 2008, it was revealed that DeAraugo had signed an endorsement deal with weight-loss company Jenny Craig. She became the star of the company's "Get Real" national program, stating that her aim was to achieve and manage her own goal weight and help promote healthiness among Australia's younger generation. On 11 August, DeAraugo appeared on the radio show 2Day FM and announced that she had been forced to withdraw from her endorsement deal with Jenny Craig due to health problems. She stated that she had discovered she was lactose intolerant and was therefore unable to keep to the required diet.

DeAraugo was arrested by Victorian Police officers twice in 2017 in regards to possession of crystal methamphetamine (more widely known as "ice") as well as a tomahawk and large knife. She faced court on 4 October 2017, where she indicated that she would plead guilty at her next court hearing on 15 November. She faced a maximum of 15 years in jail but eventually escaped conviction.

== Discography ==
=== Studio albums ===
List of albums, with selected chart positions and certifications
Title	Details	Peak chart positions	Certifications
Title	Details	AUS	Certifications
A Place I've Never Been	Released: 12 December 2005; Format: CD, digital download; Label: Sony BMG	10	ARIA: Platinum

=== Singles ===
List of singles, with selected chart positions and certifications
Year	Title	Peak chart positions	Certifications	Album
Year	Title	AUS	Certifications	Album
2005	"Maybe Tonight"	1	ARIA: Platinum	A Place I've Never Been
2006	"Faded"	8		A Place I've Never Been
2015	"It's True"	—		Dinosaur Island (soundtrack)
2015	"Shut Your Mouth"	—		Non-album single

=== Music videos ===
Year	Song	Director
2005	"Maybe Tonight"	Anthony Rose
2006	"Faded"	TWiN

=== Other appearances ===
The following have been officially released, but do not feature on an album by DeAraugo.

Year	Song	Album
2002	"Lover of Mine" "Tell Me"	Sing for the Women
2005	"Please Don't Ask Me" (John Farnham cover) "Ready" (with Australian Idol Top 13) (Note: DeAraugo performed alongside twelve other finalists from the third series of Australian Idol; Emily Williams, Lee Harding, Dan England, Daniel Spillane, Anne Robertson, James Kannis, Milly Edwards, Roxane LeBrasse, Laura Gissara, Natalie Zahra, Chris Luder and Tarni Stephens.)	Australian Idol 3: The Final 13

== Bibliography ==
=== Contributor ===
- DeAraugo, Kate (2007). "Contributor". Laugh Even Louder!. By Camp Quality. Gosford, New South Wales: Scholastic Australia Pty Limited. ISBN 978-1-74169-022-4.

== Awards and nominations ==
Year	Nominee / work	Award	Result
2006	"Maybe Tonight"	Highest Selling Single	Nominated

Preceded by Casey Donovan	Australian Idol; Winner; Season 3 (2005)	Succeeded by Damien Leith
