= Elephant Music =

- Company type: Private
- Industry: Music industry
- Founded: 2012
- Founder: Vikram Gudi
- Headquarters: London
- Website: www.elephantmusic.net

Elephant Music is a British production music company based in London, England. The company was founded by Vikram Gudi in 2012. It is best known for specialising in high-end trailer music for commercial motion pictures with a dark/thriller sound for the horror film/thriller film genres. It has supplied tracks to trailers such as Avengers: Endgame, Morbius and A Quiet Place Part II.

In 2012, Elephant Music began by signing existing commercial acts to use on advertisements. However, since 2015 it has almost exclusively produced original music for movie trailers and is now known for its extensive collection of orchestral piano productions. Elephant Music has a roster of over 30 composers.

== Awards ==
- Music & Sound Award 2019 – Best Use of Production Music – Film Trailer / Promo Glass (2019 film) International Trailer
- Music & Sound Award 2018 – Best Use of Production Music – Trailers + Promos Mother! ‘Silent’ Trailer
- Music & Sound Award 2016 – Best Composition: Trailers + Promos Suffragette (film) UK Trailer
