= X-Perience =

German Eurodance band

- Also known as: Metropolis of Enigation
- Origin: Berlin, Germany
- Genres: Pop; synthpop; trance; ethnopop
- Years active: 1995–present
- Labels: WEA (1995–1998); Polydor (1999–2003); Major Records (2006–2007); Valicon Records (2020–2025)
- Members: Matthias Uhle (1995 – present); Alexander Kaiser (1995 – present); Veerle (2026 - present)
- Past members: Claudia Uhle (1995-2007; 2018-2025); Manja Wagner (2009 – 2018)
- Website: www.x-perience.de

X-Perience is a Eurodance band from Berlin, Germany. Their music style varies between synthpop, trance and ethnopop. The band members are Veerle (vocals, lyrics), Matthias Uhle (composition, keyboards) and Alexander Kaiser (lyrics, keyboards). Singer Claudia Uhle, Matthias' sister, left the band in 2007 and was replaced by Manja Kaletka, but returned in 2019 through 2025.

== History ==
=== Beginnings (1995) ===
X-Perience was founded in 1995. Their first single CD was called "Circles of Love", released on their own label. Axel Henninger, who had worked with Camouflage before, produced the track. "Circles of Love" became a regional hit in Berlin, mainly through the radio station Fritz. This caught the attention of the major record label WEA, who offered the band a contract. WEA re-released "Circles of Love" in 1996 on a larger scale, and this single managed to enter the German Top 100.

=== First success (1996–2004) ===
The group released a second single, "A Neverending Dream". Along with the song, a video was shot, which went into heavy rotation on MTV and VIVA. "A Neverending Dream" became a huge hit at the end of 1996, peaked at #4 in the German charts and reached gold status with over 250.000 copies sold. Since the song's release, it has been covered several times most notably by the well-known dance act Cascada in 2006. Their debut album Magic Fields was released in 1997. It peaked at chart position #22 in Germany. In Finland, X-Perience became especially popular, with the album reaching platinum status.

The title track "Magic Fields" was released as a third single in 1997, along with a video that was shot in South Africa. Although the song did not reach the heights of "A Neverending Dream", it also was a hit on TV, radio, and in the charts. The second album, Take Me Home, was released in the fall of 1997. Like the debut album, it reached #22 in the German charts. Its most successful single became the dance track "I Don't Care". In 1998, X-Perience won the radio award "R.SH Gold".

After a break of three years, X-Perience came back in 2000. "Journey of Life", released by Polydor/Universal, featured a song called "The Meaning of Life", a duet with Neue Deutsche Welle and Gothic icon Joachim Witt. The single "Island of Dreams" was used as a title track for the adventure show Expedition Robinson, a German version of Survivor. After touring through Germany in the following years, the band wanted to release new music. But due to problems with Polydor, no further single was released. The band recorded among new songs cover versions of Mike Oldfields "Moonlight Shadow" and "It's a Sin" by Pet Shop Boys which were planned as single releases. But after postponing these singles were finally cancelled.

=== Departure from major labels (2005–2007) ===
In 2006, X-Perience got a new contract with Major Records in Hamburg. They released their single "Return To Paradise" and the fourth album "Lost in Paradise", including new versions of the first three X-Perience hits, mixed by José Alvarez-Brill. The album also included a duet with Midge Ure (Ultravox, Visage) called "Personal Heaven", which was released as second single.

=== Departure & absence of singer Claudia Uhle (2007–2019) ===
After the 2007 single release "I Feel Like You", which was the third and final single of the 4th album, Claudia Uhle decided to leave the band.

The new voice of X-Perience was revealed on June 3, 2009, on their official website. Manja Wagner became the new singer and the band released a new song, "Strong (Since You're Gone)". This song plus four other new songs were published on the official X-Perience Facebook profile in the following months. A new album with Manja Kaletka on vocals was planned, but never released.

=== Comeback (2020–2025) ===
On December 22, 2019, the band announced the departure of Manja Kaletka and a comeback with Claudia Uhle in 2020 on their Facebook page. The teaser single "Dream A Dream" was released on April 10, 2020, "I Feel Like You 555" was the first radio single in 13 years and was released on May 15, 2020. The fifth album "555" is produced by Valicon and was released via Valicon Records on August 21, 2020.

A new single called We Will Live Forever was announced for a release in April 2021 but was postponed to 2022. Meanwhile, a new mix of Cruisin' Wild was released as final single of the album on January 28, 2022. On January 16, 2022, singer Claudia Uhle revealed in a TikTok-livestream that the band began working on a sixth album for 2023. On March 3, 2023, the band released the single "We Travel the World" as the first single from the new album. With the single release the band started the presale and presave for the new album which production was finished at this time. On April 28, 2023, the single We Will Live Forever was released finally. The sixth album "We Travel the World" was released on August 4, 2023, and entered the German Album Charts as this week's fourth highest new entry on No.16.

X-Perience revealed that they are participating for the preselection of Germany's Eurovision Song Contest on October 17, 2023. Their Eurovision song is called "I'll Remember", but the song was not in the final selection. On June 14, 2024, the band released together with DJ & remixer Daniel La Peur a cover of Mike Oldfield and Maggie Reilly classic To France as single.

=== Second Departure of Claudia Uhle (2026–) ===
On December 26, 2025, Claudia Uhle revealed on her official website that she is no longer part of the band, focusing on her solo project Angelzoom again. The founding members Matthias Uhle and Alexander Kaiser are working on a 7th album. In 2026, the band welcomed the addition of new lead singer Veerle and announced their Miami Dark show in Berlin on September 18, 2027.

== Discography ==
=== Albums ===
- Magic Fields (WEA) – 1996
- Take Me Home (WEA) – 1997
- Journey of Life (Polydor) – 2000
- Lost in Paradise (Major Records) – 2006
- 555 (Valicon Records) – 2020
- We Travel the World (Valicon Records) – 2023

=== Singles ===
- "Circles of Love" (WEA) – 1996
- "Circles of Love" (Remixes) (WEA) – 1996
- "A Neverending Dream" (WEA) – 1996
- "A Neverending Dream" (Remixes) (WEA) – 1996
- "Magic Fields" (WEA) – 1997
- "Mirror" (WEA) – 1997
- "I Don’t Care" (WEA) – 1997
- "I Don’t Care (Remixes)" (WEA) – 1997
- "Game of Love" (WEA) – 1998
- "Island of Dreams" (Polydor) – 2000
- "Am I Right" (Polydor) – 2001
- "Return to Paradise" (Major Records) – 2006
- "Personal Heaven" feat. Midge Ure Basic + Premium Edition (Major Records) – 2006
- "I Feel Like You" (Major Records) – 2007
- "I Feel Like You 555" (Valicon Records) – 2020
- "A Neverending Dream (555 Version)" (Valicon Records) – 2020
- "Don't You Forget" (Valicon Records) – 2020
- "Never Look Back (Never Give Up)" (EP, Valicon Records) – 2021
- "Cruisin' Wild" (Valicon Records) – 2022
- "We Travel the World" (Valicon Records) – 2023
- "Say Thank You" (Valicon Records) – 2023
- "We Will Live Forever" (Valicon Records) – 2023
- "Come Come" (Valicon Records) – 2023
- "Dragonfly" (Valicon Records) – 2023
- "I'll Remember" (Valicon Records) – 2024
- "To France" (Danial La Peur & X-Perience) (Valicon Records) – 2024

=== Limited/promotional releases ===
- "Circles of Love" (limited, own label World of Enigation) – 1995
- "Limited Edition" (X-Shaped Promo-CD) (WEA) – 1997
- "Journey of Life" Canceled/Promotional Single (Polydor) – 1999
- "It’s a Sin" Canceled/Promotional Single (Polydor) – 2003
- "Dream a Dream" Teaser Single (Valicon Records) – 2020
- "And When We're Dancing" Focus Single (Valicon Records) – 2023
