= The Best of Cascada =

Greatest hits album by Cascada
- Released: 29 March 2013
- Recorded: 2004–13
- Genres: Eurodance, electropop
- Length: 58:33
- Label: Zooland
- Producers: Yanou, DJ Manian

Cascada chronology
Back on the Dancefloor (2012)	The Best of Cascada (2013)	Acoustic Sessions (2013)

Singles from The Best of Cascada
- 1. "The Rhythm of the Night" Released: 22 June 2012; 2. "Glorious" Released: 8 February 2013; 3. "The World Is in My Hands" Released: 2 August 2013

The Best of Cascada is the third compilation album released by German dance trio Cascada. It was released 29 March 2013 in Germany. Consisting of past singles, "The Best of Cascada" also features 3 new songs. The album's first single, "The Rhythm of the Night", a cover of the Corona hit, was released in 2012 and peaked at number 26 in Germany. The second single, "Glorious", was released a month before the album and achieved success in Germany, peaking inside the top-ten, being their first single in 4 years to do so.

== Content ==
The album consists of twelve singles, three new songs and two acoustic tracks. From their first album, "Everytime We Touch" (2006), three songs were included: "Everytime We Touch", "Miracle" and their cover of Savage Garden's hit "Truly Madly Deeply". From their second album, "Perfect Day" (2008), three songs were included: "What Hurts the Most", "Because The Night" and "Perfect Day". From their third album, "Evacuate the Dancefloor" (2009), three singles were included: "Evacuate the Dancefloor", "Fever" and "Dangerous".

From their fourth album, "Original Me" (2011), only two songs were included: "Pyromania" and "San Francisco". The song "Summer of Love", from their 2012 compilation "Back on the Dancefloor", was also included. The new material consists of three songs; the first being "The Rhythm of the Night", a cover of Corona hit, "Glorious" and "The World Is in My Hands". The album closes with two acoustic songs: an acoustic version of "Glorious" and an acoustic version of "Enemy", a song present on "Original Me".

== Singles ==
In May 2012, lead vocalist Natalie Horler announced that a new single of the band was set to be released in the next few months. In early June, a video clip of Horler performing a cover of Corona's "The Rhythm of the Night" surfaced online. On 22 June, "The Rhythm of the Night" was released. The single peaked inside the top-ten in Austria, while peaking within the top-forty in Germany and Switzerland.

In 2013, after a Christmas album, the band recorded "Glorious" for a chance to represent their country at the Eurovision Song Contest 2013. The single was released on 8 February 2013 and it was placed at number 21 in the Eurovision Final. However, the single gained success in Germany, peaking at number 6, becoming their first top-ten single since "Evacuate the Dancefloor" (2009) and their fourth top-ten overall. The third and last new song "The World Is in My Hands" will also be a single, with a video being released on 19 July 2013. The single was released on 2 August 2013.

== Track listing ==
No.	Title	Writer(s)	Producer(s)	Length
1.	"Glorious (Video Edit)"	Andres Ballinas, Tony Cornelissen, Yann "Yanou" Peifer, Manuel Reuter	Yann Peifer, DJ Manian Reuter	3:29
2.	"The World Is in My Hands (Video Edit)"	Ballinas, Peifer, Reuter, Victor Finke	Peifer, Reuter, Finke	2:59
3.	"Evacuate the Dancefloor (Radio Edit)"	Allan Eshuijs, Peifer, Reuter	Reuter, Peifer	3:26
4.	"The Rhythm of the Night (Video Edit)"	Francesco Bontempi, Michael Gaffey, Peter Wilfred Glenister, Annerley Gordon, Giorgio Spagna	Reuter, Peifer	3:22
5.	"Summer of Love (Video Edit)"	Ballinas, Cornelissen, Peifer, Reuter	Reuter, Peifer	3:36
6.	"San Francisco"	Tony Cornelissen, Peifer, Reuter	Reuter, Peifer	3:46
7.	"Everytime We Touch (Radio Edit)"	Stuart MacKillop, Maggie Reilly, Peter Risavy	Reuter, Peifer	3:17
8.	"Miracle (Radio Mix)"	Peifer, Reuter	Reuter, Peifer	3:38
9.	"What Hurts the Most (Radio Mix)"	Steve Robson, Jeffrey Steele	Reuter, Peifer	3:39
10.	"Because The Night"	Patti Smith, Bruce Springsteen	Reuter, Peifer	3:24
11.	"Truly Madly Deeply (Radio Edit)"	Darren Hayes, Daniel Jones	Reuter, Peifer	2:55
12.	"Fever"	Ballinas, Peifer, Reuter	Reuter, Peifer	3:20
13.	"Pyromania (Radio Edit)"	Eshuijs, Peifer, Reuter	Reuter, Peifer	3:29
14.	"Dangerous (Radio Edit)"	Peifer, Reuter	Reuter, Peifer	2:59
15.	"Perfect Day"	Eshuijs, Peifer, Reuter	Reuter, Peifer	3:42
16.	"Glorious (Acoustic Version)"	Ballinas, Cornelissen, Peifer, Reuter	Reuter, Peifer	3:39
17.	"Enemy (Acoustic Version)"	Peifer, Reuter, Robson	Reuter, Peifer	3:53

== Release history ==
Country	Release date	Record label
Germany	29 March 2013	Zooland Records
