= Playahitty =

Italian Eurodance group

- Origin: Italy
- Genres: Eurodance, Italo dance
- Years active: 1994–1998, 2011
- Label: Disco Inn/Conte Max Music
- Past members: Giovanna Bersola
- Website: www.contemaxmusic.com

Playahitty was an Italian Eurodance group, best known for the 1994 summer hit "The Summer Is Magic", and also for other popular club tracks, such as "1-2-3! (Train with Me)". Lipsync was performed on stage and in the videos by models called Marion Zapha, Sandra, Feline and Gabrielle.

== Musical career ==
Their main hit, a 1994 song titled "The Summer Is Magic", featured the voice of Giovanna Bersola, best known by her stage name Jenny B, one of the most important voices of the Italo dance/Eurodance genre, who also did the real vocals for the debut hit of Corona, "The Rhythm of the Night" (all other songs on the first and second albums by Corona were sung by Sandra Chambers a.k.a. Sandy). This led to the mistaken belief that "The Summer Is Magic" was another hit song by Corona.

The song was written by Emanuele Asti and Stefano Carrara, produced by Asti and licensed worldwide by Disco Inn/Conte Max Music.

== Discography ==
=== Singles ===
Year	Single	Peak chart positions							Album
Year	Single	AUT	FRA	GER	ITA	NED	SWE	SWI	Album
1994	"The Summer Is Magic"	14	36	39	2	36	37	12	Singles only
1995	"1-2-3! (Train with Me)"	21	—	—	4	—	—	46	Singles only
1996	"I Love the Sun"	—	—	—	16	—	—	—	Singles only
1997	"Another Holiday"	—	—	—	—	—	—	—	Singles only
1998	"The Man I Never Had"	—	—	—	30	—	—	—	Singles only
2008	"The Summer Is Magic 2008"	—	—	—	—	31	—	—	Singles only
"—" denotes releases that did not chart
