= Rhythm of the Night =

Rhythm of the Night may refer to

- Rhythm of the Night (album), 1985 album by DeBarge
  - "Rhythm of the Night" (song), song by DeBarge from the album of the same name
- "The Rhythm of the Night", a 1993 song performed by Corona
  - The Rhythm of the Night (album), an album by Corona
- "The Rhythm of the Night", a 2008 song by Hermes House Band
