= The Summer Is Magic =

1994 song by Italian group Playahitty

"The Summer is Magic"

Single by Playahitty
- Released: 28 July 1994
- Genre: Eurodance
- Length: 3:44
- Label: Conte Max Music
- Songwriters: Emanuele Asti; Stefano Carrara
- Producer: Emanuele Asti

Playahitty singles chronology
"The Summer is Magic" (1994)	"1-2-3! (Train with Me)" (1995)

"The Summer Is Magic" is a song by Italian Eurodance group Playahitty, released in July 1994 by label Conte Max Music as their debut single. The lead vocals are performed by Italian singer Giovanna Bersola (a.k.a. Jenny B), as she did for the 1993 hit "The Rhythm of the Night" by Corona. This led to the mistaken belief that "The Summer Is Magic" was another hit song by Corona. The song hit the charts in the summer and autumn of 1994 in several countries of Continental Europe, such as Italy, where it reached number two on the Top 40 singles chart. It reached the top 40 also in Argentina, Austria, Brazil, Colombia, Denmark, France, Germany, Mexico, the Netherlands, Peru, Spain, Sweden and Switzerland. The song was released in the United States in August 1996. A partly black-and-white music video was produced to promote the single, but it didn't feature Bersola, due to her stage fright.

== Critical reception ==
Pan-European magazine Music & Media wrote, "Just at the moment when summer is over, this Euro dance single with the voice of Corona brings back memories of your holiday in Italy better than any photo album could ever do."

== Chart performance ==
"The Summer Is Magic" was a notable hit on the charts in Europe, peaking at number two in Italy and becoming a top-20 hit in Austria (14), Denmark (17), Spain (15) and Switzerland (12). In Italy, it stayed as number two for two weeks, being kept from the number-one position by Youssou N'Dour & Neneh Cherry's "7 Seconds". It spent a total of 15 weeks within the Musica e dischi singles chart. Additionally, "The Summer is Magic" entered the top 40 in the Netherlands (36), France (36), Germany (39), and Sweden (37), as well as on the Eurochart Hot 100, where it reached number 36 in September 1994, in its sixth week on the chart. On the European Dance Radio Chart, it peaked at number 10, becoming the 10th most-played dance song on European radio that week. However, the song did not chart on the UK Singles Chart. Outside Europe, it was successful in Israel, peaking at number seven on 25 October 1994, and in Canada, where it hit number eight on the RPM Dance/Urban chart. "The Summer Is Magic" also charted in Argentina, Brazil, Colombia, Peru, and Mexico.

== Track listings ==
- 7" single, Germany (1994)
1. "The Summer is Magic" (Radio Mix) — 3:44
2. "The Summer is Magic" (Acappella) — 3:39
- 12" single, Italy (1994)
1. "The Summer is Magic" (Gambrinus Club Mix) — 5:20
2. "The Summer is Magic" (Acappella) — 3:39
3. "The Summer is Magic" (Copa Cabana Beach Mix) — 5:31
4. "The Summer is Magic" (Radio Mix) — 3:44
- CD single, France & Benelux (1994)
1. "The Summer is Magic" (Radio Mix) — 3:55
2. "The Summer is Magic" (Gambrinus Club Mix) — 5:20
- CD maxi-single, Europe (1994)
1. "The Summer is Magic" (Gambrinus Club Mix) — 5:20
2. "The Summer is Magic" (Acapella) — 3:39
3. "The Summer is Magic" (Copa Cabana Beach Mix) — 5:31
4. "The Summer is Magic" (Radio Mix) — 3:44
- CD maxi-single - Remix, Germany (1994)
1. "The Summer is Magic" (Alex Party Mix) — 3:57
2. "The Summer is Magic" (Alex Party Heavy Mix) — 5:00
3. "The Summer is Magic" (D.J. Herbie Mixa Mixa) — 6:26
4. "The Summer is Magic" (Original Radio Mix) — 3:44

== Charts ==
=== Weekly charts ===
Chart (1994–95)	Peak positions
Austria (Ö3 Austria Top 40)	14
Canada Dance/Urban (RPM)	8
Denmark (IFPI)	17
Europe (Eurochart Hot 100)	36
Europe (European Dance Radio)	10
France (SNEP)	36
Germany (Media Control Charts)	39
Israel (Israeli Singles Chart)	7
Italy (Musica e dischi)	2
Netherlands (Dutch Top 40 Tipparade)	3
Netherlands (Single Top 100)	36
Peru (UPI)	5
Quebec (ADISQ)	13
Spain (AFYVE)	15
Sweden (Sverigetopplistan)	37
Switzerland (Schweizer Hitparade)	12

Chart (2008)	Peak positions
Netherlands (Single Top 100)	47

=== Year-end charts ===
Chart (1995)	Positions
Europe (European Dance Radio)	25
Netherlands (Dutch Top 40)	282

== Versions ==
- July 1995: Exotica feat. Itsy Foster - The Summer is Magic (reached #68 in the UK Singles Chart)
- 2008: Daisy Dee - The Summer is Magic
- 2013 Nicci - The Summer Is Magic
- 2023 Cuban Deejays - The Summer Is Magic
