= Try Me Out =

1995 single by Corona

Single by Corona

from the album The Rhythm of the Night
- Released: 10 July 1995
- Studio: Casablanca (Italy)
- Genre: House; nu-NRG
- Length: 3:29
- Label: DWA (Dance World Attack)
- Songwriters: Giorgio Spagna; Francesco Bontempi; Annerley Gordon
- Producers: Checco; Soul Train

Corona singles chronology
"Baby Baby" (1995)	"Try Me Out" (1995)	"I Don't Wanna Be a Star" (1995)

Music video
- "Try Me Out" on YouTube

"Try Me Out" is a song by Italian Eurodance project Corona, released in July 1995 as the third single from their debut album, The Rhythm of the Night (1995). The song was written by Francesco Bontempi, Giorgio Spagna and Annerley Gordon, and contains samples from the 1987 song "Toy" by Teen Dream. Going for a harder, more underground house music sound, it peaked within the top 10 in Denmark, Finland, Ireland, Italy, Spain, the UK, as well as on the Eurochart Hot 100. Outside Europe, the song was a top-10 hit in Australia, Israel and on the US Billboard Dance Club Play chart.

== Critical reception ==
AllMusic editor Jose F. Promis named the song a "catchy Euro hit", and one of the standout tracks on the album. Larry Flick from Billboard magazine wrote, "One of the leading acts of the ongoing Euro-NRG invasion of the pop mainstream unleashes another sparkler from the album The Rhythm of the Night. Corona is as giddy as an ingenue can be, and she is surrounded by a storm of syncopated beats and rollicking piano lines." Writing for Dotmusic, James Masterton said, "Unlike most production-line Italian dance, Corona singles do tend to have some song substance to them which has no doubt helped their chart performance". He concluded, "Top 10 could not be out of the question for this one either."

Alan Jones from Music Week commented, "Less immediate than 'The Rhythm of the Night' and 'Baby Baby', Corona's 'Try Me Out' is another slab of unsubtle Nu-NRG, best served by Lee Marrow's mixes. It's not as immediate or commercial as Corona's two big hits, but it's certain to find an instant home in the upper half of the Top 40." In a retrospective review, Pop Rescue described it as a "Euro dance romp with house pianos and powerful vocals". Daisy & Havoc from the Record Mirror Dance Update gave it four out of five, complimenting it as a "catchy song". Another Record Mirror editor, James Hamilton, named it "nasally chanted Italo disco in typical romping 0-131-0bpm Lee Marrow Eurobeat (with some good breaks)". In a very positive review for the album, Jordan Paramor from Smash Hits wrote, "Shimmy to 'Try Me Out'. Marvellous!"

== Chart performance ==
"Try Me Out" became a top-10 hit in Denmark, Finland, Ireland, Italy, Spain and the United Kingdom. In the UK, the single peaked at number six on 30 July 1995, during its third week on the UK Singles Chart. It stayed on that position for two weeks and came in at number 58 on the UK year-end chart. In the band's native Italy, "Try Me Out" peaked at number two on the Musica e dischi chart, while on the Eurochart Hot 100 and the European Dance Radio Chart, it reached number seven and number one, respectively. In Scotland, it peaked at number three. The single was also a top-20 hit in Austria, France, Iceland, and Sweden.

Outside Europe, "Try Me Out" charted at number 10 on both the Australian ARIA Singles Chart and the US Billboard Dance Club Play chart, number 38 on the Billboard Maxi-Singles Sales chart, and number 43 in New Zealand. On the Canadian RPM Dance chart, the song peaked at number 20. In West Asia, it became a successful top-10 hit in Israel, peaking at number six on 1 August 1995. "Try Me Out" was awarded a gold record in Australia for 35,000 singles shipped and a silver record in the UK, after 200,000 units were shipped.

== Music video ==
The accompanying music video for "Try Me Out" was produced by FilmMaster Clip. It depicts singer and frontwoman of the project, Olga de Souza, performing in different coloured cube-shaped rooms. Red, green and blue rooms appear to be mixed and laid on top of each other, like a Rubik's Cube. The opening and throughout the video, different people are watching a View-Master. At the most, nine cubical rooms are seen at once. They are sliding horizontally, vertical or inclined. Sometimes dancers are performing in these and other times they watches each other, through peepholes between the rooms. At the end all the nine cubes has been solved; top row in blue, middle row in red and bottom row in green. "Try Me Out" was a Box Top on British music television channel The Box for 4 weeks in August 1995. One month later, the video was C-listed on Germany's VIVA.

== Track listings ==
- 7-inch maxi
1. "Try Me Out" (Lee Marrow Eurobeat mix) – 5:10
2. "Try Me Out" (Alex Party Cool mix) – 5:40
3. "Try Me Out" (Lee Marrow club mix) – 6:02
4. "Try Me Out" (Lee Marrow Trouble mix) – 6:05
- 12-inch
1. "Try Me Out" (Lee Marrow Eurobeat mix) – 5:10
2. "Try Me Out" (Lee Marrow club mix) – 6:02
3. "Try Me Out" (Alex Party Cool mix) – 5:40
4. "Try Me Out" (MK vocal mix) – 7:21
- CD single
1. "Try Me Out" (Lee Marrow airplay mix) – 3:29
2. "Try Me Out" (Lee Marrow Eurobeat mix) – 5:10
3. "Try Me Out" (Alex Party Cool mix) – 5:40
4. "Try Me Out" (MK radio edit) – 3:40
- CD single
1. "Try Me Out" (radio edit) – 3:29
2. "Try Me Out" (Lee Marrow club mix) – 6:02
- CD maxi (25 August 1995)
1. "Try Me Out" (Lee Marrow radio mix) – 3:29
2. "Try Me Out" (Lee Marrow club mix) – 6:02
3. "Try Me Out" (Lee Marrow Eurobeat mix) – 5:10
4. "Try Me Out" (Alex Party Cool mix) – 5:40
5. "Try Me Out" (MK vocal mix) – 7:21
6. "Try Me Out" (Lee Marrow Trouble mix) – 6:05
7. "Try Me Out" (MK dub mix) – 7:28
- CD maxi (UK) (on WEA label)
1. "Try Me Out" (Lee Marrow airplay mix) – 3:26
2. "Try Me Out" (Lee Marrow Eurobeat mix) – 5:08
3. "Try Me Out" (Alex Party Cool mix) – 5:40
4. "Try Me Out" (MK radio edit) – 3:39
5. "Try Me Out" (Lee Marrow club mix) – 6:03
6. "Try Me Out" (MK vocal mix) – 7:21
7. "Try Me Out" (Lee Marrow Trouble mix) – 6:27

== Personnel ==
- Written by Francesco Bontempi, Giorgio Spagna and Annerley Gordon
- Vocals by Sandy Chambers
- Created, arranged and produced by Checco and Soul Train for Lee Marrow productions
- 'Lee Marrow Airplay Mix', 'Lee Marrow Eurobeat Mix', 'Lee Marrow Club Mix' and 'Lee Marrow Trouble Mix' :
  - Remixed by Lee Marrow
  - Sound engineer : Francesco Alberti at Casablanca Recordings (Italy)
- 'Alex Party Cool Mix' : Remixed by Visnadi with Alex Natale DJ at "77 Studio" Mestre (Venice, Italy)
- 'MK Radio Edit' and 'MK Vocal Mix' : Remix and additional production by Marc Kinchen for MCT

== Charts ==
=== Weekly charts ===
Chart (1995)	Peak position
Australia (ARIA)	10
Austria (Ö3 Austria Top 40)	20
Belgium (Ultratop 50 Flanders)	44
Belgium (Ultratop 50 Wallonia)	29
Canada Dance/Urban (RPM)	20
Denmark (IFPI)	6
Europe (Eurochart Hot 100)	7
Europe (European Dance Radio)	1
Europe (European Hit Radio)	22
Finland (Suomen virallinen lista)	5
France (SNEP)	11
Germany (Media Control Charts)	40
Iceland (Íslenski Listinn Topp 40)	18
Ireland (IRMA)	7
Israel (Israeli Singles Chart)	6
Italy (Musica e dischi)	2
Italy Airplay (Music & Media)	5
Netherlands (Dutch Top 40)	32
Netherlands (Single Top 100)	45
New Zealand (Recorded Music NZ)	43
Scotland (OCC)	3
Spain (AFYVE)	4
Sweden (Sverigetopplistan)	17
Switzerland (Schweizer Hitparade)	23
UK Singles (OCC)	6
UK Dance (OCC)	11
UK Airplay (Music Week)	15
UK Club Chart (Music Week)	14
UK Pop Tip Club Chart (Music Week)	2
US Dance Club Play (Billboard)	10
US Maxi-Singles Sales (Billboard)	38

=== Year-end charts ===
Chart (1995)	Position
Australia (ARIA)	63
Europe (Eurochart Hot 100)	53
Europe (European Dance Radio)	9
France (SNEP)	65
Italy (Musica e dischi)	8
Latvia (Latvijas Top 50)	202
UK Singles (OCC)	58
UK Pop Tip Club Chart (Music Week)	22

== Certifications ==
Region	Certification	Certified units/sales
Australia (ARIA)	Gold	35,000^{^}
United Kingdom (BPI)	Silver	200,000^{^}
^{^} Shipments figures based on certification alone.

== Release history ==
Region	Date	Format(s)	Label(s)	Ref.
United Kingdom	10 July 1995	12-inch vinyl; CD; cassette	Eternal; WEA	
United States	19 September 1995	Rhythmic contemporary; contemporary hit radio	EastWest	
Japan	21 October 1995	CD	DWA (Dance World Attack)	
