= I Don't Wanna Be a Star =

1995 single by Corona

Single by Corona

from the album The Rhythm of the Night
- Released: November 1995
- Studio: Casablanca, Italy
- Genre: Eurodisco
- Length: 3:58
- Label: DWA (Dance World Attack)
- Songwriters: Francesco Bontempi; Antonia Bottari; Giorgio Spagna; Ivana Spagna
- Producers: Checco; Soul Train

Corona singles chronology
"Try Me Out" (1995)	"I Don't Wanna Be a Star" (1995)	"Megamix" (1997)

Music video
- "I Don't Wanna Be a Star" on YouTube

"I Don't Wanna Be a Star" is a song by Italian band Corona, released in November 1995 through DWA (Dance World Attack) as the fourth and final single from Corona's debut album, The Rhythm of the Night (1995). The song was written by Francesco Bontempi, Antonia Bottari and Ivana Spagna, and was a club hit in many European countries. Unlike the previous Corona singles, it has disco sonorities. The song peaked at number one in both Italy and Spain, number five in Hungary and number six in Finland. In the UK and on the Eurochart Hot 100, it peaked within the top 30, and it is also Corona's last major hit. The accompanying music video was filmed on locations in Rome, Italy.

== Critical reception ==
AllMusic editor Jose F. Promis described the song as "irresistible", naming it one of the standout tracks on The Rhythm of the Night album. James Masterton for Dotmusic commented, "All hail the return of the synth drum. Ever since Corona first hit the dizzy heights of Number 2 with 'The Rhythm of the Night' at the end of 1994 they have proved that they are far from one-hit wonders but instead are one of the finest pop acts around." He added that it is "possibly their best single yet", and "such a perfect pastiche of a 1970s disco track that it could almost be a reissue. It isn't, instead being a completely up to date track but sounding every inch a classic already - right down to the cheesy synth drum which has surely not been heard since the days of Kelly Marie and 'Feels Like I'm In Love'."

Music Week gave it a score of three out of five, writing, "A Seventies version featuring Chic-like string flourishes, handclaps and syn-drums, which should go down a storm in the gay clubs." In a retrospective review, Pop Rescue deemed it as "catchy", noting the single version as "laden with a disco sound", while the album version is not. Andrew Diprose from Smash Hits gave "I Don't Wanna Be a Star" four out of five, saying, "Question: What have Corona got to do with glitter balls, flares and platform shoes? Yup, disco's back! Corona have returned with a luscious disco number, big on seventies sounds with a '90s euro house feel. A choon to keep everyone happy! Say 'party!'"

== Chart performance ==
"I Don't Wanna Be a Star" peaked at number one on the singles chart in Spain and Italy, and was a top-10 hit also in Finland and Hungary. Additionally, the single was a top-20 hit in France, Iceland, Latvia and Scotland. In the UK, it reached number 22 on 17 December 1995, during its first week on the UK Singles Chart. It spent six weeks within the chart in total. On the Record Mirror On a Pop Tip Club Chart, it reached number one. On the Eurochart Hot 100, the single entered the top 30, peaking at number 23 in January 1996, and ended up as number 91 on the 1996 Year-End Sales Charts. It also peaked at number four on the European Dance Radio Chart. Outside Europe, "I Don't Wanna Be a Star" reached number six on the RPM Dance/Urban chart in Canada, number eight in Israel and number 109 in Australia.

== Music video ==
The music video for "I Don't Wanna Be a Star" was shot in Rome, Italy. Several famous places from the city can be seen in the video, like Colosseum, Harry's Bar, and Via Veneto. Many scenes are also showing Corona's frontwoman Olga de Souza singing in front of the Trevi Fountain. Other scenes show her in a restaurant where she poses for photographs or sitting in a taxi while paparazzi are following her. The video is made in a 70s-style, and throughout the video, de Souza wears many different costumes and wigs in different colors.

== Track listings ==
- CD single
1. "I Don't Wanna Be a Star" (70's Radio Edit) — 4:33
2. "I Don't Wanna Be a Star" (Lee Marrow E.U.R.O. Radio Edit) — 3:58
- CD maxi
1. "I Don't Wanna Be a Star" (Lee Marrow E.U.R.O. Radio Edit) — 3:58
2. "I Don't Wanna Be a Star" (Lee Marrow 70's Radio Edit) — 4:33
3. "I Don't Wanna Be a Star" (Lee Marrow Club Mix) — 5:32
4. "I Don't Wanna Be a Star" (Lee Marrow Eurobeat Mix) — 6:51
5. "I Don't Wanna Be a Star" (Lee Marrow & the Magnificent 70's Mix) — 6:27
6. "I Don't Wanna Be a Star" (Lee Marrow Original Long Mix) — 4:57
7. "I Don't Wanna Be a Star" (UK hardcor-ona Dub) — 5:37
8. "I Don't Wanna Be a Star" (a Cappella) — 3:58
- 12-inch maxi

A1. "I Don't Wanna Be a Star" (Lee Marrow Eurobeat Mix) — 6:51
A2. "I Don't Wanna Be a Star" (Lee Marrow Club Mix) — 5:32
A3. "I Don't Wanna Be A Star" (Lee Marrow E.U.R.O. Radio Edit) — 3:58
A4. "I Don't Wanna Be a Star" (a Cappella) — 3:58
B1. "I Don't Wanna Be a Star" (Lee Marrow & the Magnificent 70's Mix) — 6:27
B2. "I Don't Wanna Be a Star" (Lee Marrow Original Long Mix) — 4:57
B3. "I Don't Wanna Be a Star" (Lee Marrow 70's Radio Edit) — 4:33
B4. "I Don't Wanna Be a Star" (UK hardcor-ona Dub) — 5:37

- 7-inch maxi

A. "I Don't Wanna Be a Star (Lee Marrow & the Magnificent 70's Mix) — 6:27
B. "I Don't Wanna Be a Star" (Lee Marrow Eurobeat Mix) — 6:51

== Personnel ==
- Created, arranged and produced by Checco and Soul Train for a Lee Marrow production
- Vocals by Sandy Chambers
- Engineered by Francesco Alberti at Casablanca Recordings (Italy), Graphic Art Sunrise (Italy)
- 'UK Hardcor-Ona Dub' :
  - Remix and additional production by Gino Olivieri and Ivan Palvin for Premier Musik Productions Inc.
  - Assisted by Marco Vani
  - Mix engineered by Bruno Ruffolo at In-Da-Mix Studio, Montreal (Canada)
  - Re-organised, replayed and reconstructed by DJ Moisha and Mixmaster Irving

== Charts ==
=== Weekly charts ===
Chart (1995–1996)	Peak position
Australia (ARIA)	109
Austria (Ö3 Austria Top 40)	25
Canada Dance/Urban (RPM)	6
Europe (Eurochart Hot 100)	23
Europe (European Dance Radio)	4
Europe (European Hit Radio)	23
Finland (Suomen virallinen lista)	6
France (SNEP)	18
Germany (GfK)	69
Hungary (Mahasz)	5
Iceland (Íslenski Listinn Topp 40)	16
Israel (Israeli Singles Chart)	8
Italy (Musica e dischi)	1
Italy Airplay (Music & Media)	6
Latvia (Latvijas Top 50)	13
Netherlands (Dutch Top 40 Tipparade)	16
Scotland (OCC)	17
Spain (AFYVE)	1
Sweden (Sverigetopplistan)	37
UK Singles (OCC)	22
UK Airplay (Music Week)	12
UK Club Chart (Music Week)	44
UK Pop Tip Club Chart (Music Week)	1

=== Year-end charts ===
Chart (1996)	Position
Europe (Eurochart Hot 100)	91
Latvia (Latvijas Top 50)	198
UK Pop Tip Club Chart (Music Week)	31

== Release history ==
Region	Date	Format(s)	Label(s)	Ref.
Italy	November 1995	12-inch vinyl; CD	DWA	
Spain	November 1995	12-inch vinyl; CD	Blanco y Negro	
Australia	4 December 1995	CD; cassette	DWA; Columbia; Dance Pool	
United Kingdom	11 December 1995	12-inch vinyl; CD; cassette	Eternal	
