= Evacuate the Dancefloor =

Evacuate the Dancefloor may refer to:

- Evacuate the Dancefloor (album), 2009 album by Cascada
- "Evacuate the Dancefloor" (song), song from the album
