= Baby Baby (Corona song) =

1995 single by Corona

Single by Corona

from the album The Rhythm of the Night
- Released: 27 February 1995
- Studio: Casablanca, Italy
- Genre: Eurodance; house; nu-NRG
- Length: 3:45
- Label: DWA (Dance World Attack)
- Songwriters: Francesco Bontempi; Antonia Bottari
- Producers: Checco; Soul Train

Corona singles chronology
"The Rhythm of the Night" (1993)	"Baby Baby" (1995)	"Try Me Out" (1995)

Music video
- "Baby Baby" on YouTube

Alternative cover
- 2007 Sunblock version

"Baby Baby" is a song by Italian band Corona, released in February 1995 by ZYX Music as the second single from their debut album, The Rhythm of the Night (1995). The song is written by Francesco Bontempi and Antonia Bottari and performed by British singer Sandy Chambers. The song was originally a hit in 1991 for Italian project Joy & Joyce as "Babe Babe". Both tracks were produced by Bontempi under his Lee Marrow guise. "Baby Baby" was successful on the singles charts around the world, peaking at number one for five weeks in Italy as well as on the Canadian RPM Dance/Urban chart. In the UK, it peaked at number five for two weeks. Two different music videos were produced for the song.

In 2007, the Swedish dance group Sunblock made a cover of the song, which peaked at number one in Spain and number four in Finland.

== Critical reception ==
AllMusic editor Jose F. Promis described the song as the "aggressive" follow-up to "The Rhythm of the Night", naming it one of the standout tracks on the album. Upon the release, Larry Flick from Billboard magazine stated that the song "steamrolls down a similar Euro-NRG dance/pop path." He wrote, "Although the airwaves are now flooded with similarly giddy fare, this jampacks a chorus that is insistently contagious—and it is voiced with a fullthrottle diva energy. To that end, both radio and club tastemakers should climb aboard early." Swedish Expressen complimented it as "at least as good" as their first single.

Dave Sholin from the San Francisco-based Gavin Report said, "It took awhile for some to come to the party on 'The Rhythm of the Night', but they were happy with the results. This pumpin', thumpin' follow-up will keep 'em dancing and create the same excitement." Alan Jones from Music Week described "Baby Baby" as "a storming house/Nu-NRG track that has already soared to the apex of RMs On a Pop Tip chart. If it charts lower than top five, I'll be very surprised." Thessa Mooij from Music & Media praised it as "an uptempo dance track which mixes a synthi Europop sound and Corona's powerful R&B voice." James Hamilton from the RM Dance Update declared it as "more squawking simple Italo catchiness" in his weekly dance column.

== Chart performance ==
"Baby Baby" peaked at number one in Italy for five weeks in April and May 1995, as well as becoming a top-10 hit in Australia, Denmark, Finland, Iceland, Ireland, Norway, Spain, Sweden and the United Kingdom. In the UK, it peaked at number five during its second and third weeks on the UK Singles Chart, after having debuted at number seven. On the UK Dance Chart, the song reached number four, while peaking at number one on the UK Pop Tip Club Chart. On the Eurochart Hot 100, "Baby Baby" became a top-five hit, peaking at number five after four weeks on the chart, on 22 April, while on the European Dance Radio Chart, it peaked at number one, becoming the most-played dance song on European radio that week.

In Europe, the single was also a top-20 hit in Austria, France, Germany and Switzerland. Outside Europe, it reached number one on the Canadian RPM Dance chart. In Israel, "Baby Baby" peaked at number four on 25 April 1995 and spent four weeks in the top 10. In Australia, it peaked at number seven and stayed for 19 weeks inside the ARIA singles chart, with six weeks in the top 10. In neighboring New Zealand, the single reached number 22. In the United States, "Baby Baby" peaked at numbers 39 and 57 on the Cash Box Top 100 and Billboard Hot 100 charts, respectively. On the Billboard Dance Club Play chart, the song reached number five.

== Music videos ==
Two different music videos were produced for "Baby Baby": a European version and an US version. The latter version was directed by Mark Humphrey and produced by FilmMaster Clip, featuring Corona's frontwoman Olga de Souza attending a party in the disused Aldwych tube station in London. In the European video, which has a sepia tone, an overweight man is watching TV and switching from one channel to another with a remote control. Suddenly de Souza appears on the screen, and when the music starts, the man finds himself lying on a big bed with her. It has a headboard shaped as giant lips and she crawls on the bed, singing to him. Apparently frightened by this, he looks for an exit and tries to escape, but is surprised by two women behind a door. He is then placed in a chair, while the women are teasing and seducing him. In the end, the man is seen smiling, with lipstick kiss-marks all over his head. A re-edited version of this video omits all footage of the man.

== Legacy ==
On Attitude's list of "The Top 10 Dance Tunes of the '90s" in 2016, "Baby Baby" was ranked number six.

== Track listings ==
=== Corona version ===
- CD single
1. "Baby Baby" (Lee Marrow Radio Mix) (3:45)
2. "Baby Baby" (Robyx Piano Remix Short Edit) (3:55)
- CD-maxi
1. "Baby Baby" (Lee Marrow Radio Mix) (3:45)
2. "Baby Baby" (Robyx Piano Remix Short Edit) (3:55)
3. "Baby Baby" (Dancing Divaz Club Mix) (6:07)
4. "Baby Baby" (Lee Marrow Extended Mix) (5:55)
5. "Baby Baby" (Robyx Piano Remix) (5:39)
6. "Baby Baby" (Dancing Divaz Rhythm Mix) (5:45)
- 7-inch single
1. "Baby Baby" (Lee Marrow Radio Mix) (3:45)
2. "Baby Baby" (Robyx Piano Remix Short Edit) (3:55)
- 7-inch maxi
1. "Baby Baby" (Lee Marrow Extended Mix) (5:55)
2. "Baby Baby" (Robyx Piano Remix) (5:39)
3. "Baby Baby" (Dancing Divaz Club Mix) (6:07)
4. "Baby Baby" (Dancing Divaz Rhythm Mix) (5:45)

=== Joy & Joyce version ===
- CD single & 12-inch single
1. "Babe Babe" (Extended Version) (6:18)
2. "Babe Babe" (Club Version) (6:18)
3. "Babe Babe" (Radio Edit) (3:53)

=== Sunblock version ===
- CD-maxi
1. "Baby Baby" (Radio Edit)
2. "Baby Baby" (Extended Version)
3. "Baby Baby" (The Audiophiles Remix)
4. "Baby Baby" (Ian Carey Remix)
5. "Baby Baby" (DJ DLG Remix)
6. "Baby Baby" (Friday Night Posse Remix)
7. "Baby Baby" (Frisco Remix)
8. "Baby Baby" (Audiophiles Remix)

== Personnel ==
- Written by Francesco Bontempi and Antonia Bottari
- Lead and Backing vocals by Sandy Chambers
- Published by Many Edizioni Musicali - B. Mikulski Publ. - SFR Music
- Created, arranged and produced by Checco and Maurizio Silvestri ITA & Soul Train for a Lee Marrow production
- Engineered by Francesco Alberti at Casablanca Recordings (Italy)
- 'Lee Marrow Radio Mix' and 'Lee Marrow Extended Mix' : Additional editing by Robyx
- 'Robyx Piano Remix Short Edit' and 'Robyx Piano Remix' : Remixed and reconstructed by Robyx
- 'Dancing Divaz Club Mix' and 'Dancing Divaz Rhythm Mix'
  - Remix and additional editing by production by Dancing Divaz
  - Additional keyboards by Colin Thorpe

== Charts ==
=== Weekly charts ===
Corona version

Chart (1995)	Peak position
Australia (ARIA)	7
Austria (Ö3 Austria Top 40)	13
Belgium (Ultratop 50 Flanders)	46
Belgium (Ultratop 50 Wallonia)	23
Canada Dance/Urban (RPM)	1
Denmark (IFPI)	4
Europe (Eurochart Hot 100)	5
Europe (European Dance Radio)	1
Europe (European Hit Radio)	6
Finland (Suomen virallinen lista)	6
France (SNEP)	16
Germany (Media Control)	41
Iceland (Íslenski Listinn Topp 40)	10
Ireland (IRMA)	8
Israel (Israeli Singles Chart)	4
Italy (Musica e dischi)	1
Netherlands (Dutch Top 40)	22
Netherlands (Single Top 100)	26
New Zealand (Recorded Music NZ)	22
Norway (VG-lista)	7
Scotland (OCC)	3
Spain (AFYVE)	2
Sweden (Sverigetopplistan)	10
Switzerland (Schweizer Hitparade)	11
UK Singles (OCC)	5
UK Dance (OCC)	4
UK Airplay (Music Week)	11
UK Club Chart (Music Week)	29
UK Pop Tip Club Chart (Music Week)	1
US Billboard Hot 100	57
US Dance Club Songs (Billboard)	5
US Dance Singles Sales (Billboard)	12
US Pop Airplay (Billboard)	31
US Rhythmic Airplay (Billboard)	32
US Cash Box Top 100	39

Sunblock version

Chart (2007)	Peak position
Finland (Suomen virallinen lista)	4
Netherlands (Mega Top 100)	99
Spain (Promusicae)	1
Sweden (Sverigetopplistan)	13
UK Singles (OCC)	16

=== Year-end charts ===
Corona version

Chart (1995)	Position
Australia (ARIA)	44
Canada Dance/Urban (RPM)	3
Europe (Eurochart Hot 100)	46
France (SNEP)	77
Israel (Israeli Singles Chart)	41
Italy (Musica e dischi)	9
Latvia (Latvijas Top 50)	88
Netherlands (Dutch Top 40)	165
Sweden (Topplistan)	100
Switzerland (Schweizer Hitparade)	33
UK Singles (OCC)	84
UK Pop Tip Club Chart (Music Week)	2

== Certifications ==
Region	Certification	Certified units/sales
United Kingdom (BPI)	Silver	200,000^{‡}
^{‡} Sales+streaming figures based on certification alone.
