= Sing a Song Now Now =

"Sing A Song Now Now"
- 1999 Italian CD single

Single by Alberto Carpani
- B-side: "Remix"
- Released: 17 November 1999 (Italy) [Remix] March 7, 2000 (Italy); 20 May 2000 (France)
- Recorded: G.R.S Studio Vimodrone (Milan) 1999
- Genre: Europop, Italo dance
- Length: 3:12
- Label: Exe Records (Italy); Vale Music (Spain); East West Records (France)
- Songwriters: Alberto Carpani; Gino Zandonà; Roberto Turatti; Silvio Melloni
- Producers: Alberto Carpani; Gino Zandonà

Alberto Carpani singles chronology
"Sing A Song Now Now" (1999)	"Ring The Bell" (2000)

Alternate cover
- 2000 French CD single

Sing A Song Now Now is a song by the Italian group A.C. One. It was Written by Roberto Turatti, Silvio Melloni, Gino Zandonà & Alberto Carpani, the song was released on 17 November 1999. The single featured the solo artist Alberto Carpani and the vocalist Sandra Chambers. A Remix version was released on 7 March 2000, which features the two new remix versions of the track, both mixes were remixed by Twin Towers, (an Italian project with the consisting members of Max Marani and Roberto Arduini,) but it was only released on a 12-inch vinyl. On 20 May 2000 Sing A Song Now Now was released in France by East West Records, under the record label Warner Music Group. The single peaked moderately at number 54 for 5 weeks on the SNEP French Singles Chart In May 2000.

== CD maxi ==
Spain

1. "Sing A Song Now Now" (Single Track) — 3:13
2. "Sing A Song Now Now" (A.C. One Version) — 5:55
3. "Sing A Song Now Now" (Kid Mix) — 4:45
4. "Sing A Song Now Now" (G.R.S. Remix) — 5:05

CD maxi
Italy

1. "Sing A Song Now Now" (Single Track) — 3:19
2. "Sing A Song Now Now" (Kid Mix) — 4:44
3. "Sing A Song Now Now" (G.R.S. Remix) — 4:54

France

1. "Sing A Song Now Now" (Single Track) — 3:13
2. "Sing A Song Now Now" (A.C. One Version) — 5:12
3. "Sing A Song Now Now" (Kid Mix) — 4:40
4. "Sing A Song Now Now" (G.R.S. Remix) — 4:54

== CD single ==
France

1. "Sing A Song Now Now" (Single Track) — 3:13
2. "Sing A Song Now Now" (A.C. One Version) — 5:12

== Vinyl 12" ==
France

1. "Sing A Song Now Now" (A.C. One Version) — 5:12
2. "Sing A Song Now Now" (Single Track) — 3:13
3. "Sing A Song Now Now" (Kid Mix) — 4:40
4. "Sing A Song Now Now" (G.R.S. Remix) — 4: 45

Spain

1. "Sing A Song Now Now" (A.C. One Version)
2. "Sing A Song Now Now" (Single Track)
3. "Sing A Song Now Now" (Kid Mix)
4. "Sing A Song Now Now" (G.R.S. Remix)

Italy

1. "Sing A Song Now Now" (A.C. One Version) — 5:55
2. "Sing A Song Now Now" (Single Track) — 3:13
3. "Sing A Song Now Now" (Kid Mix) — 4:45
4. "Sing A Song Now Now" (G.R.S. Remix) — 5:05

Italy (Remix)

1. "Sing A Song Now Now" (Twin Towers Remix) — 4:59
2. "Sing A Song Now Now" (T.T. Cut Remix) — 3:30
3. "Sing A Song Now Now" (A.C. One Version) — 5:13
4. "Sing A Song Now Now" (Single Track) — 3:13

== Charts ==
Chart (1999/2000)	Peak position
France (SNEP)	54
Spain (AFYVE)	6
