= Sandra Chambers =

British singer

Sandra Chambers (born 11 April 1967 in London), also known as Sandy Chambers or simply Sandy, is an English dance music vocalist based in Italy.

== Career ==
Chambers moved to Italy in 1992 and her voice has been used in many Italian Electronic dance music productions, mainly Eurodance. In the 2000s Chambers has been frequently used by Italian producers Alle and Benny Benassi who she first met when she did the vocals for a track by the Italian dance act J.K., that the Benassis produced. She later collaborated with them on the KMC project “Get Better”, which reached the Top 30 of the Billboard Dance Club Songs chart in the US and remained on the chart for 11 weeks.

Chambers continued working with the Benassi cousins on “Illusion” and “Feel Alive”, taken respectively from the albums “Pumphonia” and “…Phobia”, both certified Gold in France.

“Illusion” reached #3 on the Billboard chart, entered the Top 20 in France and Belgium, and charted in Switzerland and the Netherlands. The track was also later referenced in Achille Lauro’s “I Wanna Be an Illusion”, from the album “1990”, which reached the top of the Italian sales chart. “Feel Alive” further confirmed the success of Benassi Bros. and Sandy Chambers in the United States, remaining on the Billboard Airplay Chart for 19 weeks.

In early 2000, she also toured with Italian singer Giorgia.

As a songwriter, Chambers contributed to the Corona project. She also sang all the songs on Corona's album The Rhythm of the Night, except the album's title track which was performed vocally by singer Jenny B. The group's most famous hits, sung by Chambers, are "Baby Baby", "Try Me Out" and "I Don't Wanna Be a Star". In 2007, Chambers admitted to being the vocalist on Corona's album, and was credited as "original Corona vocalist Sandy Chambers" on Sunblock's single "Baby Baby," a cover on which she appeared as lead vocalist.

When Bobby Farrell was allowed to use the name Boney M. he released a Boney M. remix album with Sandy doing the female vocals under Bobby Farrell & Sandy Chambers.

== Discography ==
- 1990s - "Dreamin' Stop" (Mag's Prout featuring Sandra Chambers)
- 1992 - "Send Me An Angel" (with Netzwerk)
- 1993 - "Breakdown" (with Netzwerk)
- 1994 - "I'm Feeling" with Charles Shaw
- 1994 - "Everybody's Dancing"
- 1995 - "Baby Baby" (with Corona)
- 1995 - "Try Me Out" (with Corona)
- 1995 - "I Don't Wanna Be a Star" (with Corona)
- 1995 - "Bad Boy" (as Sandy)
- 1995 - "Dancing with an Angel" (with Double You)
- 1995 - "Wanna Be With You" (as Jinny)
- 1995 - "You Know What I Want" (with Fa-Ta)
- 1996 - "My Radio" (with J.K.)
- 1998 - "Don't tell me Lies" (as Jhava)
- 1999 - "Sing A Song Now Now" (with A.C. One)
- 2000 - "Lovin' it" (with Kyma)
- 2002 - "I Miss You" (with Mimmo M)
- 2003 - "Get Better" (with KMC)
- 2003 - "Illusion" (with Benassi Bros.)
- 2004 - Pumphonia (with Benassi Bros.)
- 2005 - ...Phobia (with Benassi Bros.)
- 2005 - "Give It Time" (as Sandy Chambers)
- 2007 - "Play My Music" (as Sandy Chambers)
- 2007 - "Get Hot" (Diego Donati vs F&A Factor)
- 2008 - "Foundation" (Pussy Dub Foundation)
- 2008 - "Make the World Go Round" (Pussy Dub Foundation)
- 2008 - "Break the Wall" (Sandy & Dhany)
- 2009 - "Get out of my mind" (Avretto feat. Sandy)
- 2009 - "This is me" (as Sandy Chambers)
- 2009 - "Brighter" (Pocho and Sandy Chambers)
