= The Rhythm of the Night (album) =

Studio album by Corona
- Released: April 4, 1995
- Genre: Eurodance
- Length: 64:58
- Labels: Warner Music; ZYX
- Producers: Checco & Soul Train

Corona chronology
The Rhythm of the Night (1995)	Walking on Music (1998)

Singles from Rhythm of the Night
- 1. "The Rhythm of the Night" Released: November 5, 1993; 2. "Baby Baby" Released: February 27, 1995; 3. "Try Me Out" Released: July 3, 1995; 4. "I Don't Wanna Be a Star" Released: November 27, 1995

Professional ratings
Review scores
Source	Rating
AllMusic	4/5 stars
Music Week	4/5 stars
NME	8/10
Pop Rescue	(favorable)
Smash Hits	4/5 stars
Spin	(mixed)

The Rhythm of the Night is the debut album by Italian Eurodance act Corona, released on 4 April 1995. The album includes the worldwide hit single "The Rhythm of the Night", along with the singles "Baby Baby", "Try Me Out" and "I Don't Wanna Be a Star".

== Critical reception ==
Music Week gave the album 4 out of 5, writing, "Olga De Souza belts out a collection of songs from hedonistic heaven. The success of the title track and follow-up single, 'Baby Baby', bode well for this superior dance album." NME ranked it eight out of ten, commenting, "Once more the Spagna Brothers, I and G, and their mate F Bontempi — who gave us 'Ride On Time' — rock out with new singer Corona. This is all you ever wanted — other people's song titles ('Don't Go Breaking My Heart', the title track) over a belting dance beat. Immaculate." Jordan Paramor from Smash Hits named it Best New Album, adding, "Then the DJ spins a smart Corona record and life is good again! Suddenly everyone's grooving to a jump-around, fling-your-arms-about tune, and there's nine of them to be found on this album! Shimmy to 'Try Me Out'. Marvellous! Bop to 'I Gotta Keep Dancin'. Er...danceable! And well worth your money."

== Track listing ==
No.	Title	Writer(s)	Length
1.	"Baby Baby"	Francesco Bontempi; Antonia Bottari	3:45
2.	"Try Me Out"	Bontempi; Giorgio Spagna; Annerley Gordon	3:24
3.	"Get Up and Boogie"	Bontempi; Bottari; Ivana Spagna	3:13
4.	"I Don't Wanna Be a Star"	Bontempi; Bottari; I. Spagna	3:15
5.	"I Want Your Love"	Bontempi; Mauro Marcolin; Valerio Gaffurini; Federico Di Bonaventura	3:42
6.	"In the Name of Love"	Bontempi; Bottari; I. Spagna	3:38
7.	"I Gotta Keep Dancin'"	M. Anthony	3:35
8.	"The Rhythm of the Night"	Bontempi; G. Spagna; Gordon; Pete Glenister; Mike Gaffey	4:20
9.	"Baby I Need Your Love"	Bontempi; G. Spagna; Gordon	4:09
10.	"Don't Go Breaking My Heart"	Franco Martinelli; Antonio Puntillo	3:17
11.	"When I Give My Love"	Bontempi; Stefano Tonelli; Marco Baroni; Luca Ratti; Andrea Bellucci	3:30
12.	"Do You Want Me"	Bontempi; Andrea Martin; Nick Heathen; I.G. Off	3:28
13.	"You Gotta Be Movin'"	Bontempi	5:26
14.	"The Rhythm of the Night" (Rapino Bros 7" Single)	Bontempi; G. Spagna; Gordon; Glenister; Gaffey	3:40
15.	"Baby Baby" (Dancing Divaz Club Mix)	Bontempi; Bottari	6:07
16.	"The Rhythm of the Night" (Lee Marrow Space Mix; duet with Ice MC)	Bontempi; G. Spagna; Gordon; Glenister; Gaffey	6:29

== Personnel ==
- Created, arranged and produced by Checco & Soul Train for a Lee Marrow production
- Vocally performed by Sandy Chambers (except tracks 8) and Jenny B (track 8)
- All tracks recorded and mixed by Lee Marrow (except tracks 11–13)
- Engineered by Francesco Alberti at Casablanca Recordings, Italy
- Graphic art: Sunrise, Italy

== Charts and certifications ==
=== Weekly charts ===
Weekly chart performance for The Rhythm of the Night
Chart (1995)	Peak position
Australian Albums (ARIA)	10
Finnish Albums (The Official Finnish Charts)	30
French Albums (SNEP)	26
Swiss Albums (Swiss Hitparade)	35
Scottish Album Chart	21
UK Albums (OCC)	18
US Billboard Heatseekers Albums Chart	2

=== Year-end charts ===
1995 year-end chart performance for The Rhythm of the Night
Chart (1995)	Position
Australian Albums (ARIA)	99

=== Certifications ===
Certifications and sales for The Rhythm of the Night
Region	Certification	Certified units/sales
Australia (ARIA)	Gold	35,000^{^}
^{^} Shipments figures based on certification alone.
