= The World Is in My Hands =

Single by Cascada

from the album The Best of Cascada
- Released: August 2, 2013
- Recorded: 2013
- Genre: EDM; progressive house
- Label: Zooland Records
- Songwriters: Tim Bergling, Martijn Garritsen, Anton Zaslavski, Yann Peifer, Manuel Reuter, Ash Pournouri & Andres Ballinas

Cascada singles chronology
| "Glorious" (2013) | "The World Is in My Hands" (2013) | "Blink" (2014) |

Music video
- "The World Is In My Hands" on YouTube

"The World Is in My Hands" is a song written by Avicii, Martin Garrix, Zedd, Yann Peifer, Manuel Reuter, Ash Pournouri and Andres Ballinas and recorded by German dance act Cascada. The track was confirmed as the third and final single taken from their latest compilation album “The Best of Cascada” that was released on digital retailers on March 29, 2013 via Zooland Records.

The music video was premiered on the Universal Music page on July 19 with the single being released worldwide on August 2.

The song is included on a number of compilation albums, including: Ministry Of Sound - Ibiza Annual 2013, Future Trance 65, Techno4ever.fm - Sensation Dance! Vol 2, Ballermann Hits Party 2014

== Video ==
The music video was premiered on Universal Music webpage on 19 July 2013. Zooland Records published the video via YouTube on 24 July 2013. The video starts with a young boy playing a piano in a large empty room, as Natalie wanders through, singing to the camera and occasionally leaning against the brick wall. There is interjecting images of a city skyline and dancers in a tunnel. Towards the end of the video, the dancers join Natalie in the room, and dance behind her as she finishes the song.

== EP Track listing ==
From Discogs.

Digital download
| No. | Title | Length |
|---|---|---|
| 1. | "The World Is In My Hands" (Video Edit) | 2:57 |
| 2. | "The World Is In My Hands" (Ryan Thistlebeck Vs. Manila Radio Edit) | 3:23 |
| 3. | "The World Is In My Hands" (Steve Modana Radio Edit) | 3:05 |
| 4. | "The World Is In My Hands" (Extended Mix) | 4:13 |
| 5. | "The World Is In My Hands" (Ryan Thistlebeck Vs. Manila Remix) | 5:29 |
| 6. | "The World Is In My Hands" (Steve Modana Remix) | 4:02 |

== Release history ==
| Region | Date | Format | Label |
|---|---|---|---|
| Worldwide | August 2, 2013 | Digital download | Zooland |
