= Glorious (Cascada song) =

2013 single by Cascada

Single by Cascada

from the album The Best of Cascada
- Released: 8 February 2013
- Recorded: 2012 at Plazmatek Studio, Bonn, Germany
- Length: 3:28
- Label: Universal; Zeitgeist; Zooland
- Songwriters: Yann Peifer; Manuel Reuter; Andres Ballinas; Tony Cornelissen
- Producers: Manual "Manian" Reuter; Yann "Yanou" Peifer

Cascada singles chronology
| "The Rhythm of the Night" (2012) | "Glorious" (2013) | "The World Is in My Hands" (2013) |

Music video
- "Glorious" (Official) on YouTube

Eurovision Song Contest 2013 entry
- Country: Germany
- Artist: Cascada
- Language: English
- Composers: Yann Peifer; Manuel Reuter; Andres Ballinas; Tony Cornelissen
- Lyricists: Yann Peifer; Manuel Reuter; Andres Ballinas; Tony Cornelissen

Finals performance
- Final result: 21st
- Final points: 18

Entry chronology
- ◄ "Standing Still" (2012)
- "Is It Right" (2014) ►

"Glorious" is a song performed by German dance recording trio Cascada. It was written by Yann Peifer, Manuel Reuter, Andres Ballinas and Tony Cornelissen. The song was included on their compilation album The Best of Cascada (2013). It was announced that the song would be one of the candidate songs of the Unser Song für Malmö, the German national selection for the Eurovision Song Contest 2013. A preview of the song was published on 9 January 2013. The same day the full version was leaked. The song represented Germany in the Eurovision Song Contest 2013. The song was released in Germany as a digital download on 8 February 2013.

Despite being one of the favorites to win it finished in 21st of 26 places with 18 points.

== Media ==
On 14 February 2013 they performed the song live during Unser Song für Malmö. They performed the song live at the Eurovision Song Contest 2013 at the Malmö Arena, Malmö, Sweden on 18 May 2013.

== Accusations of plagiarism ==
After "Glorious" was selected to represent Germany at the Eurovision Song Contest 2013, regional broadcaster, Norddeutscher Rundfunk (NDR), reported that it had "commissioned a musical audit", and that it would examine the claims that the song had plagiarised the Eurovision Song Contest 2012 winning song, "Euphoria" by Swedish artist Loreen.

Natalie Horler, lead singer of Cascada, told news agency Deutsche Presse-Agentur: "If you like, we can superimpose one song on the other. They are two different songs". Tina John, a phonetician quoted in the German newspaper Bild, that the two high-tempo tracks were noticeably similar, "The chorus uses the same accentuation, the ending peaks with the same combinations. The singers even use the same breathing methods".

NDR played down the accusations of plagiarism, with the head of entertainment at NDR, Thomas Schreiber saying "Every year, there are stories. Last year, Loreen's "Euphoria" was accused of being filched from David Guetta and Rihanna, claims that went nowhere".

Bild interviewed Thomas G:son and Peter Boström, the composers/producers of "Euphoria". G:son stated: "When the German authorities indeed believe that it might be plagiarism of one of our songs, they can investigate that. It's their right to do so. In general, pop songs are alike".

G:son was asked about going to court about the matter, G:son stated: "We definitely feel honoured. It's not plagiarism to us, however. If you look at the composition in a waveform, you will see that 10,000 pop songs have similar courses".

It was later announced on 25 February 2013, that the song was cleared of plagiarism and would represent Germany at the Eurovision Song Contest 2013. This conclusion was reached in an independent audit by music consultant Mathias Pogoda, who specializes in cases of musical plagiarism.

== Music video ==
A music video to accompany the release of "Glorious" was first released on YouTube on 1 February 2013.

== Track listing ==
German digital download/CD single
| No. | Title | Length |
|---|---|---|
| 1. | "Glorious" (Video Edit) | 3:27 |
| 2. | "Glorious" (Extended Mix) | 4:43 |

UK digital EP
| No. | Title | Length |
|---|---|---|
| 1. | "Glorious" | 3:27 |
| 2. | "Glorious" (Extended Mix) | 4:42 |
| 3. | "Glorious" (David May Radio Edit) | 3:27 |
| 4. | "Glorious" (David May Remix) | 4:26 |
| 5. | "Glorious" (Ryan Thistlebeck Radio Edit) | 3:05 |
| 6. | "Glorious" (Ryan Thistlebeck Remix) | 4:39 |

US digital EP
| No. | Title | Length |
|---|---|---|
| 1. | "Glorious" (Video Edit) | 3:27 |
| 2. | "Glorious" (David May Radio Edit) | 3:27 |
| 3. | "Glorious" (Ryan Thistlebeck Radio Edit) | 3:05 |
| 4. | "Glorious" (Extended Mix) | 4:42 |
| 5. | "Glorious" (David May Remix) | 4:26 |
| 6. | "Glorious" (Ryan Thistlebeck Remix) | 4:39 |

Eurovision Song Contest: Malmö 2013 - The Album
| No. | Title | Length |
|---|---|---|
| 10. | "Glorious" | 2:57 |

== Charts ==
Weekly chart performance for "Glorious"
| Chart (2013) | Peak positions |
|---|---|
| Austria (Ö3 Austria Top 40) | 29 |
| Czech Republic Airplay (ČNS IFPI) | 54 |
| Germany (GfK) | 6 |
| Ireland (IRMA) | 94 |
| Switzerland (Schweizer Hitparade) | 56 |
| UK Dance (Official Charts) | 27 |
| UK Independent (Official Charts) | 18 |
| UK Singles (OCC) | 129 |

== Release history ==
Release dates and formats for "Glorious"
| Region | Date | Format | Label | Ref. |
|---|---|---|---|---|
| Germany | 8 February 2013 | Digital download; CD | Zooland Records+ | |
| United States | 15 February 2013 | Digital download; CD | Zooland Records+ | |
| Canada | 15 February 2013 | Digital download; CD | Zooland Records+ | |
| France | 15 February 2013 | Digital download; CD | Zooland Records+ | |
| Sweden | 8 March 2013 | Digital download; CD | Catchy Tunes/Family Tree Music AB | |
| United Kingdom | 24 March 2013 | Digital download; CD | AATW | |
