= Olga Souza =

Brazilian singer (born 1968)

Olga de Souza
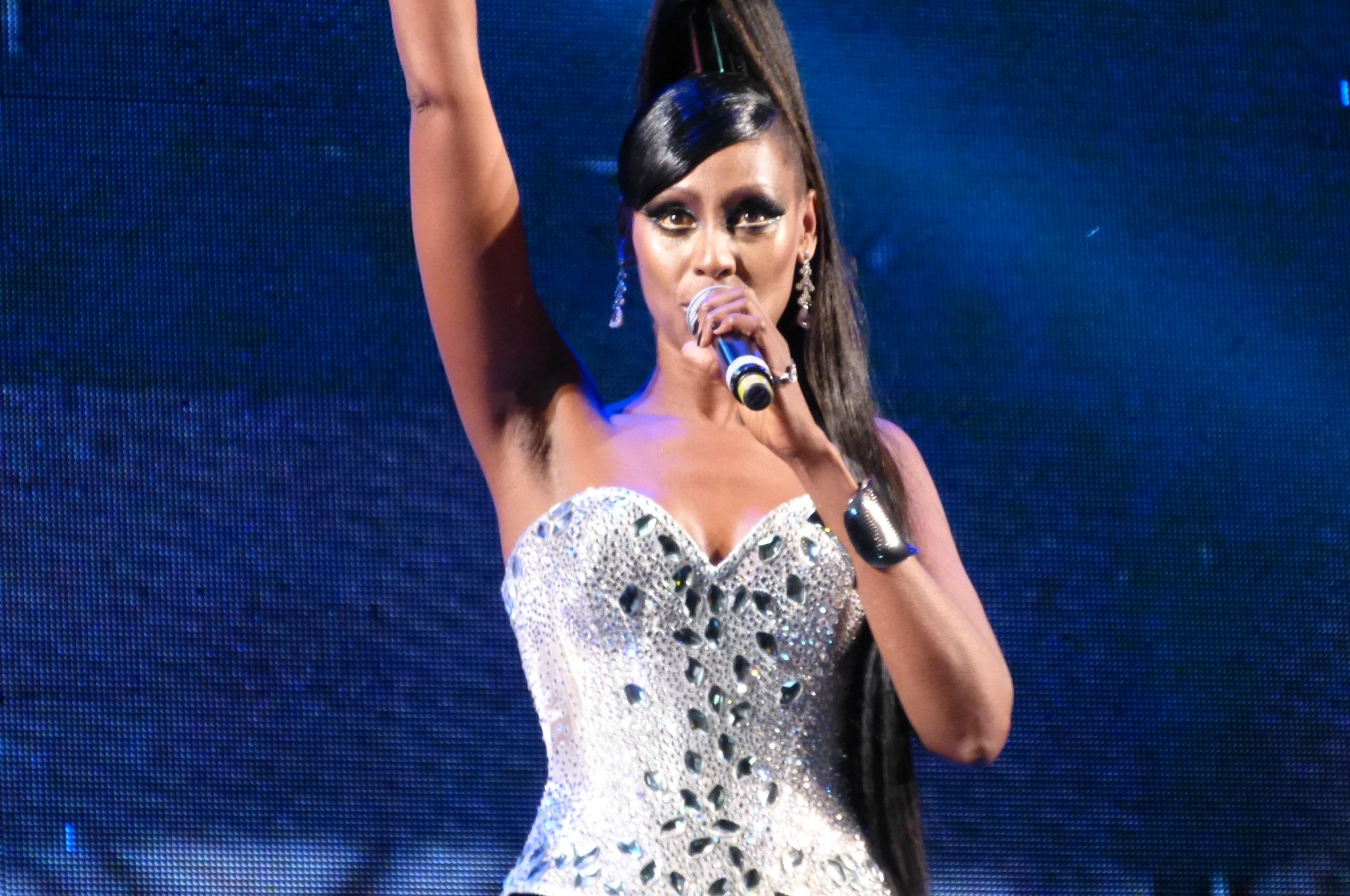
- Souza performing in Brazil, 2013
- Born: Olga Maria de Souza; 16 July 1968 (age 58); Rio de Janeiro, Brazil
- Citizenship: Brazilian; Italian
- Occupations: Singer; model; dancer; songwriter
- Spouses: Unknown (m. 1990; div. 1992) Gianluca Milano (m. 2002)
- Musical career
- Genres: Eurodance; dance-pop
- Instrument: Vocals
- Years active: 1993–present
- Label: DWA (Dance World Attack)
- Member of: Corona

Olga Maria de Souza (born 16 July 1968) is a Brazilian and naturalized-Italian singer, model and dancer. She is best known as the frontwoman of the Italian group Corona, produced by Francesco "Checco" Bontempi, a.k.a. "Lee Marrow".

== Early life ==
Souza was born in the Rio de Janeiro neighborhood of Vigário Geral in 1968, into a musical family. Her father was a musician and her mother was a cook. She worked as a clerk at the Caixa Econômica Federal bank for a few years before deciding to travel around the world. She arrived in Italy in 1990. There, in 1993, after supposedly being discovered performing in a club by producer Emanuele Asti, he made her part of Italian music project Corona, where she was hired to lip sync to the vocals of Jenny B and Sandy Chambers.

== Career ==
=== Works with Corona ===
Corona released their first single, "The Rhythm of the Night" in 1993, which featured the vocals of Italian singer Jenny B. The song remained at No. 1 in the Italian charts for 13 weeks. An album of the same name was released in 1995 in Europe and topped the charts in several countries, gaining a platinum disc after selling more than 10 million copies worldwide. The group began its first world tour, and the album was released in the United States. All the other tracks on the album were recorded by Sandy Chambers.

Corona's second album Walking On Music, was released in 1998 (the last album which featured Sandy Chambers as the lead vocalist). In 2000, a third album, And Me U, was released. A new sound, new vocals. This time the vocals for this new album were provided by sisters Bernadette "Brandy" Jones and Bambi Jones (who died of cancer in 2010). Corona participated as a guest in a concert named Angel Live, dedicated to John Paul II in 2006, and in that same year she released her comeback single called "Back In Time", which was the first single that featured Olga de Souza as the original vocalist. Souza returned to America in 2007, where she continued her tour with the band. Corona released its fourth album named Y Generation in 2010, on POP Records.

=== Television work ===
In 1996, Souza debuted as a host on the Italian television singing contest Festivalbar. She was a successful TV performer and was later invited to host a show named Dance Machine in France. Since May 2014, she has appeared as a contestant on the game show Hora do Faro aired on Brazilian TV channel Rede Record.

== Personal life ==
Souza married a Brazilian in Italy in 1990, but they divorced in 1992. In 1998, the magazine Isto É Gente cited her as the Brazilian who paid the most taxes in Italy, in reference to her fortune. In 2002 she was married in Miami to the Italian businessman Gianluca Milano, with whom she lives today. In 2010, the Italian newspaper Corriere della Sera quoted that Souza's fortune was 10 million euros. In 2013, she said that "they already have their sock" with a house in the neighborhood of Morumbi in São Paulo, a place within the same state, a house in Rome, a house in Rio de Janeiro, a house in Portugal, a house in Spain and a "good financial life". She also said: "My husband taught me how to save, but I like to buy rare and branded things, sometimes I buy shoes and bags and hide them in the garage, I put talcum powder to disguise it". Souza also has her own label in Italy, 1st Pop, a subsidiary of Universal Records.
