= Alberto Carpani =

Italian singer (1956–2020)

- Also known as: A1, Jock Hattle, Albert One, and A.C. One
- Born: 23 April 1956; Pavia, Italy
- Died: 11 May 2020 (aged 64) Pavia, Italy
- Genres: Pop; Italo disco; Italo dance
- Years active: 1979–2020
- Labels: Time Records; Baby Records; ZYX Records; Universal Music Group

Alberto Carpani (23 April 1956 – 11 May 2020) was an Italian singer, best known for his Italo disco releases in the late 1970s and early 1980s as Albert One, and his Eurodance release "Sing a Song Now Now" in 1999 as A.C. One. He was also a DJ and music producer.

== Career ==
Alberto Carpani was known in the 1980s. He released the singles "Yes No Family", "Turbo Diesel", "Heart on Fire", "Lady O", "For Your Love", "Secrets", "Hopes & Dreams", "Everybody", "Visions", and "Loverboy". They were released by ZYX Music and Baby Records.

He was known as A1, Jock Hattle, Albert One, and A.C. One. He was involved in many Italo projects such as Clock On 5, Enola, Funny Twins, Tom Dollar, and X-One.

His last major hit, the 1999 single "Sing a Song Now Now", reached number 6 in the Spanish music charts.

== Death ==
Carpani died of cardiovascular complications from a lung infection in Italy on 11 May 2020.

== Discography ==
=== Studio albums ===
As Albert One

Title	Album details
Everybody	Release date: 1988; Label: (ZYX Music)

=== Singles ===
- "Crazy Family" (1983) As Jock Hattle Band
- "Turbo Diesel" (1984)
- "Heart on Fire" (1985)
- "Lady O" (1985)
- "To Be or Not To Be" (1986) As Jock Hattle Band
- "For Your Love" (1986)
- "Secrets" (1986)
- "Hopes & Dreams" (1987)
- "Everybody" (1988)
- "Visions" (1988)
- "Loverboy" (1989)
- "All You want" (1993)
- "Mandy" (1998)
- "Music" (2002)
- "Stay" (2010)
- "Face to Face" (2015)
- "All for One" (2017)

==== As A.C. One ====
Year	Single	Peak chart positions		
Year	Single	FRA	ITA	SPA
1999	"Sing a Song Now Now"	—	—	6
2000	"Sing a Song Now Now" (remix) (ITA only)	—	—	—
2000	"Sing a Song Now Now" (re-release)	54	24	—
2000	"Ring the Bell" (ITA only)	—	—	—
2008	"Angels (Love Is the Answer)"	—	—	—

=== Compilation appearances ===
- "Turbo Diesel" on High Energy (1984)
- "Lady O" on 38º De Sannido (1985) and Sannido Discoteca (1985)
- "Secrets" on Fior Di Loto 1 (1986), The Best of Italo Disco Vol. 7 (1986) and Discomix Vol. 2 (1986)
- "Hopes & Dreams" on The Best of Italo-Disco Vol. 9 (1987)
- "For Your Love" on The Best of Italo-Disco Vol. 8 (1987)
- "Vision" on The House Sound of Europe – Vol. V – 'Casa Latina (1989)
- "Hopes and Dreams" on City Dance Music 2 (1989)
- "Loverboy" on Best Disco Vol. 7 (1989)
- "This Is Real" on Gira La Palla Compilation (1993)

Albert One's remix of Barry Manilow's "Mandy" was featured on Mixage (1999) and Feten Boot Mix Vol. 1 (1999).
