= Dangerous (Cascada song) =

Single by Cascada

from the album Evacuate the Dancefloor
- Released: October 12, 2009
- Recorded: 2008–2009
- Genre: Eurodance
- Length: 3:01
- Label: All Around the World
- Songwriter(s): Y. Peifer; T. Cornellisen; M. Reuter
- Producer(s): Manuel Reuter; Yann Peifer

Cascada singles chronology
"Fever" (2009)	"Dangerous" (2009)	"Pyromania" (2010)

Music video
- "Dangerous" on YouTube

"Dangerous" is a song by Cascada, released as a single in 2009 from their third studio album Evacuate the Dancefloor. It was the second single released in the UK and Ireland from the album but the third overall. The music video was uploaded to YouTube by the UK record company All Around the World on August 17, 2009, and the single was released in the United Kingdom on October 12, 2009.

"Dangerous" was performed on the National Lottery EuroMillions draw, broadcast on BBC One on 18 September 2009. It is composed in the key signature of E-flat minor and has a tempo of 145 BPM.

== Track listings and formats ==
- UK CD single
1. "Dangerous" (Radio Edit)
2. "Dangerous" (Cahill Radio Edit)
- UK iTunes pre-order EP
1. "Dangerous" (Radio Edit)
2. "Dangerous" (Cahill Radio Edit)
3. "Dangerous" (Wideboys Remix)
4. "Dangerous" (Original Mix)
5. "Evacuate The Dancefloor" (Unplugged Acoustic Mix)
- UK digital download
1. "Dangerous" (Radio Edit)
2. "Dangerous" (Cahill Radio Edit)
3. "Dangerous" (Original Mix)
4. "Dangerous" (Wideboys Remix)
5. "Dangerous" (N-Force Remix)
6. "Dangerous" (Immerze Remix)
7. "Dangerous" (Cahill Remix)
- UK club promo CD single
1. "Dangerous" (Cahill Mix)
2. "Dangerous" (Original)
3. "Dangerous" (Darren Styles Mix)
4. "Dangerous" (N-Force Mix)
5. "Dangerous" (Wideboys Stadium Mix)
6. "Dangerous" (Immerze Mix)
7. "Dangerous" (Fugitives Special Dance Mix)
8. "Dangerous" (Wideboys Stadium Dub)
- Dutch iTunes EP
1. "Dangerous" (Radio Mix)
2. "Dangerous" (Cahill Radio Edit)
3. "Dangerous" (Wideboys Radio Edit)
4. "Dangerous" (Fugitive Radio Edit)
5. "Dangerous" (Original Mix)
- Dutch Extended Mixes
1. "Dangerous" (Cahill Remix)
2. "Dangerous" (Wideboys Remix)
3. "Dangerous" (Wideboys Dub Remix)
4. "Dangerous" (Fugitive Remix)
5. "Dangerous" (N-Force Remix)
6. "Dangerous" (Darren Styles Remix)
7. "Dangerous" (Immerze Remix)
8. "Dangerous" (Westend DJs Remix)
9. "Dangerous" (Technikore Remix)

== Music video ==
The music video for "Dangerous" was released to YouTube on August 17, 2009. At the start of the video, Horler is sitting up on her bed, with her boyfriend next to her. Her boyfriend gets ready to leave. Horler then holds out what appears to look a bit like an airline ticket. Her boyfriend takes it and leaves. Horler then goes on her laptop, where she can see everything her boyfriend is doing.

Her boyfriend has left the house and is driving to a lounge. He gets out of the car and goes in, where he meets another girl and acts lovingly with her. Horler then drives to the lounge in her car, and the video returns to Horler's boyfriend. He takes the girl to get some drinks, and then as the two of them go downstairs, the video shifts to Horler who is at the lounge and is sitting down with people dancing behind her.

After this, Horler's boyfriend appears again with the girl. The two of them are in a deserted room and are about to kiss. Her boyfriend is then shown sitting on the bed, and the girl is asleep. Horler appears looking puzzled. Her boyfriend removes a picture in the room, where there is a safe. He opens the safe and takes out a necklace. Horler then goes downstairs, and as her boyfriend is coming out of the hallway, she meets him and places her hand on his mouth.

Horler takes her boyfriend to another room, where she pushes him onto the bed, takes off his jacket, and kisses him. She then goes to another room, leaving her boyfriend in that room. Her boyfriend gets up and knocks on the door, to find there is no response. He opens the door and finds the curtains fluttering in the wind. He is upset, and then he rushes to another room, and finds his jacket, but no necklace. The video ends with Horler walking out of the lounge wearing the necklace. She gets into her car and gives a wink as she drives away.

== Charts ==
Chart (2009)	Peak position
Finland (Suomen virallinen lista)	19
Netherlands (Single Top 100)	99
Slovakia (Rádio Top 100)	32
UK Singles (OCC)	67

== Release history ==
Region	Date	Format
United Kingdom	October 12, 2009	CD single, Digital download
Netherlands	February 1, 2010	Digital download
