= Fever (Cascada song) =

Single by Cascada

from the album Evacuate the Dancefloor
- Released: October 9, 2009
- Recorded: 2009
- Genre: EDM, Eurodance
- Length: 3:24
- Label: Zooland
- Songwriters: Yann Peifer; Andres Ballinas; Manuel Reuter
- Producers: Manuel Reuter; Yann Peifer

Cascada singles chronology
"Evacuate the Dancefloor" (2009)	"Fever" (2009)	"Dangerous" (2009)

Alternative cover
- U.S. release

Music video
- "Fever" (official video) on YouTube

"Fever" is a single released by Cascada from their album Evacuate the Dancefloor. It was released as the second single from the album, initially in Germany on 9 October 2009, with various other countries following suit. In the United Kingdom it served as the third single from the album (following 'Dangerous', which was selected as the second single there).

== Music structure ==
"Fever" is the only song on the Evacuate The Dancefloor album that has profanity, though the one occasion where this happens is bleeped out. It has a moderate dance groove and it is composed in the key of D minor with a tempo of 128 beats per minute.

== Music video ==
It was mentioned on the Official Cascada Twitter page that a video was shot at the end of July, but the identity of the track was kept secret at the time. The video was finally revealed as "Fever" and had its official premiere on German TV station Viva on 17 September 2009.

The video begins with several still shots of an office building, and singer Natalie Horler and two entourage walking inside. Horler, wearing a navy blazer with a pink corset, stockings and pink ballerina-style black high heels and holding a cane, and her two backup dancers walk past a businesswoman who is having trouble holding several books and papers. Horler knocks over what she is carrying, and her papers flutter down several flights of stairs. She walks into a business meeting, and angrily hits her cane on the table while her entourage destroy several posters of Horler labeled "beauty" and "princess". She crawls across the table, and the video cuts to Horler and her two dancers on a stage in the office lobby, dancing while attracting the attention of everyone passing through the room. This scene is shown throughout the video. Horler is also shown in several scenes chair dancing with her backup dancers and also lying on pink chiffon. In the meeting room, Horler continues to crawl across the table, grabbing a businessman by his tie and pushing him back in his chair and also throwing a glass of water into the face of one businesswoman. Horler then takes a businessman's papers and throws them in the air while her backup dancers cause havoc by pouring a liquid on a man's head and begin to kiss one of the businesswomen. In the third verse of the song, the video cuts into slow motion, and towards the end of the verse, Horler pulls out a can of hairspray from a bag on the table and sets the scattered papers across the table and everything else in the room on fire while the businesspeople evacuate the room.

The video began to receive airplay on UK music channels on 4 November 2009.

== Track listing and formats ==
- German / French CD single
1. "Fever" (radio edit)
2. "Fever" (Ryan Thistlebeck remix)
- German digital download
1. "Fever" (radio edit)
2. "Fever" (Ryan Thistlebeck remix)
3. "Fever" (extended mix)
4. "Fever" (Ian Carey remix)
5. "Fever" (D.O.N.S remix)
6. "Fever" (Mowgli & Bagheera remix)
- German digital download (Bonus iTunes tracks)
1. "Fever" (radio edit)
2. "Fever" (Ryan Thistlebeck remix)
3. "Fever" (extended mix)
4. "Fever" (Ian Carey remix)
5. "Fever" (D.O.N.S remix)
6. "Fever" (Mowgli & Bagheera remix)
7. "Fever" (Pasha deluxe remix)
8. "Fever" (music video)
- UK digital download
1. "Fever" (radio edit)
2. "Fever" (extended mix)
3. "Fever" (Wideboys radio edit)
4. "Fever" (Wideboys club mix)
5. "Fever" (D.O.N.S remix)
6. "Fever" (Ian Carey remix)
7. "Fever" (Hypasonic remix)
- US digital download/CD Maxi-Single
1. "Fever" (radio edit)
2. "Fever" (album version)
3. "Fever" (Wideboys radio edit)
4. "Fever" (Zac McCrack bootleg radio edit)
5. "Fever" (Ryan Thistleback radio edit)
6. "Fever" (Pasha deluxe radio edit)
7. "Fever" (extended mix)
8. "Fever" (Wideboys remix)
9. "Fever" (Zac McCrack bootleg remix)
10. "Fever" (Ryan Thistleback remix)
11. "Fever" (Pasha deluxe remix)
12. "Fever" (Ian Carey remix)
13. "Fever" (D.O.N.S. remix)
14. "Fever" (Mowgli & Bagheera remix)
15. "Fever" (Hypasonic remix)
- Australia digital download
1. "Fever" (radio edit)
2. "Fever" (Ryan Thistlebeck remix)
3. "Fever" (extended mix)
4. "Fever" (Ian Carey remix)
5. "Fever" (D.O.N.S remix)
6. "Fever" (Mowgli & Bagheera remix)
7. "Fever" (Pasha deluxe remix)
8. "Fever" (music video)
- Australia single
1. "Fever" (radio edit)
2. "Fever" (Wideboys radio edit)

== Charts ==
The single was released on 21 December 2009, in the United Kingdom, but due to lack of airplay and no physical CD release, the single failed to make any impact on the charts. This marks the first time a Cascada single has failed to appear in the top 100 in the UK. The single did however chart at #36 on the UK Dance Chart. The song debuted at #31 in Germany and #10 in France. The single spent a total of 14 weeks on the US Hot Dance Airplay Chart with a peak of #14. The single stayed 27 weeks in the France Single Charts

Chart (2009/2010)	Peak position
Australia (ARIA)	41
Austria (Ö3 Austria Top 40)	38
Belgium (Ultratip Bubbling Under Flanders)	6
Belgium (Ultratip Bubbling Under Wallonia)	9
Czech Republic Airplay (ČNS IFPI)	27
European Hot 100 Singles (Billboard)	31
France (SNEP)	10
Germany (GfK)	31
Netherlands (Dutch Top 40)	24
Netherlands (Single Top 100)	55
New Zealand (Recorded Music NZ)	32
Slovakia Airplay (ČNS IFPI)	16
UK Dance (OCC)	36
US Dance Airplay (Billboard)	14

=== Year-end charts ===
Chart (2010)	Position
France (SNEP)	79

== Release history ==
Region	Date	Format	Label
Germany, Austria, Switzerland	9 October 2009	CD single, Digital download	Zooland
Netherlands	27 October 2009	Digital download	Cloud 9
Australia	20 November 2009	CD single, digital download	Universal
United Kingdom	21 December 2009	Digital download	All Around the World
France	18 January 2010	CD single, Digital download	Universal
United States	26 January 2010	CD Maxi-Single, Digital Download	Robbins
United States	16 February 2010	Airplay	Robbins
