= Summer of Love (Cascada song) =

Single by Cascada

from the album Back on the Dancefloor
- Released: 30 March 2012
- Recorded: 2011–2012
- Genre: Europop; electro house
- Length: 3:36
- Label: Universal; Zooland; Zeitgeist
- Songwriter(s): Yann Peifer; Manuel Reuter; Andres Ballinas; Tony Cornelissen
- Producer(s): Manual "Manian" Reuter; Yann "Yanou" Peifer

Cascada singles chronology
"Night Nurse" (2011)	"Summer of Love" (2012)	"The Rhythm of the Night" (2012)

"Summer of Love" is a song performed by German dance recording trio Cascada. It served as the lead single from their compilation album, Back on the Dancefloor, released on 30 March 2012 through Zooland Records. In Germany it peaked at #13, while it peaked at #7 in Austria, the song's highest peak.

== Background ==
In an interview in January 2012, Natalie Horler from Cascada had mentioned the group would start working on more dance-like songs. In February, her Facebook page revealed that Cascada had recorded the track, and that many would love it. On 2 March 2012, it was revealed that the new single was called "Summer of Love", and would be released on 30 March. A preview was released on the same day, with many praising the track for its dance composition as opposed to the more "pop" sound of their past few singles which had led to a decline in record sales. It was released on 30 March in Germany, Austria, Switzerland and the U.S. In the UK it was released on 22 July, it peaked at #123 on the UK singles chart.

== Music video ==
On 5 March 2012, Natalie posted a Facebook update stating that she was on her way to Tenerife to shoot the music video for the single. A music video was first released onto YouTube on 22 March 2012 at a total length of three minutes and thirty-nine seconds.

== Track listing ==
Digital download
No.	Title	Length
1.	"Summer of Love" (Video Edit)	3:36
2.	"Summer of Love" (Extended Mix)	5:02
3.	"Summer of Love" (Michael Mind Project Radio Edit)	3:24
4.	"Summer of Love" (Michael Mind Project Remix)	4:52
5.	"Summer of Love" (Ryan T. & Rick M. Remix)	4:51
6.	"Summer of Love" (Ryan T. & Rick M. Radio Edit)	3:16
7.	"Summer of Love" (Ian Carey Club Mix)	6:33

== Chart performance ==
=== Weekly charts ===
Chart (2012)	Peak position
Austria (Ö3 Austria Top 40)	7
Belgium (Ultratip Bubbling Under Wallonia)	4
Denmark (Tracklisten)	21
France (SNEP)	23
Germany (GfK)	13
Netherlands (Single Top 100)	76
Scotland (OCC)	81
Switzerland (Schweizer Hitparade)	13
UK Dance (OCC)	22
UK Singles (Official Charts Company)	123

=== Year-end charts ===
Chart (2012)	Position
France (SNEP)	113

== Release history ==
Country	Date	Format	Label
Austria	30 March 2012	Digital download/Physical copy	Zooland
Germany	30 March 2012	Digital download/Physical copy	Zooland
Switzerland	30 March 2012	Digital download/Physical copy	Zooland
United States	30 March 2012	Digital download	Zooland
France	6 April 2012	Digital download/Physical copy	Zooland
United Kingdom	22 July 2012	Digital download/Physical copy	All Around the World
