= Evacuate the Dancefloor (album) =

Studio album by Cascada
- Released: 3 July 2009
- Recorded: 2008–2009
- Studios: Plazmatek Studio (Cologne, Germany); Yanou Studio 1
- Genres: Eurodance; dance-pop; electropop
- Length: 36:36
- Labels: Zooland; AATW
- Producers: Manuel Reuter; Yann Peifer

Cascada chronology
Perfect Day (2007)	Evacuate the Dancefloor (2009)	Original Me (2011)

Singles from Evacuate the Dancefloor
- 1. "Evacuate the Dancefloor" Released: 29 June 2009; 2. "Fever" Released: 9 October 2009; 3. "Dangerous" Released: 12 October 2009

Evacuate the Dancefloor is the third studio album from German Eurodance group Cascada, consisting of DJ Manian, Natalie Horler, and Yanou, first released in Ireland on 3 July 2009 and United Kingdom on 6 July 2009. Recording sessions for the album took place during 2008 to 2009 at Plazmatek Studio, Yanou Studio 1. The entire album, like their previous albums, was produced by Yanou and DJ Manian. The album's genre shifts away from the uptempo Eurodance music the group is well noted for and moves toward a more mainstream electropop sound while drawing influences of urban contemporary and pop music. Musically, the album is composed of dance tracks with thick Euro synths, cymbal crashing beats and Europop lyrics. Lyrically, the album is composed of songs about love, dancing and relationships.

Critical reception of the album overall was positive, with critics praising the new sound and lyrics. Three singles were released from the album. "Evacuate the Dancefloor", the lead single from the album, was first released on 29 June 2009. It peaked in the top five in over twelve countries, including The Netherlands and the United Kingdom where they peaked at number one. Fever was released internationally as the second single, and as the third in the United Kingdom. It failed to match the success of its predecessor, but cracked the top forty in seven countries. "Dangerous" was released on 12 October 2009 as the final single from the album and as the second single in the United Kingdom. It peaked in the top ten in Slovakia and Finland.

== Background ==
With the release of their first single, "Evacuate the Dancefloor", the group's sound began to move toward modern electropop and contemporary R&B. It featured a variety of synthesizers, different basslines, and new instrument sounds which contrasted to the traditional style of Cascada. Critics compared the song to works of Lady Gaga, but Natalie Horler explained that the song was "one of the first songs that we recorded when Lady Gaga wasn't even around." Previews of the album began to appear on YouTube on 23 June 2009. Despite the variation in sound, four tracks on the album resemble their earlier works: "Hold On", "Dangerous", "Ready or Not", and "What About Me". "Breathless" mimics Kelly Clarkson's pop-rock sound with pulsating synths and the drum beats of "Evacuate the Dancefloor" and "Hold Your Hands Up" holds similar qualities to Natasha Bedingfield's music.

== Critical reception ==
Professional ratings
Review scores
Source	Rating
AllMusic	3.5/5 stars
Billboard	Positive
CD Kritik	Positive
Digital Spy	2/5 stars

Evacuate the Dancefloor received generally positive reviews. Billboard Magazine was in favor of the album claiming "it repeats that single's formula: combining Horler's teen-bop vocals with a walloping, turbo-charged kick drum that could fit in a warehouse rave. They favored songs like "Everytime I Hear Your Name", "What About Me", "Ready or Not" and "Fever".Digital Spy found the album altogether bleak stating "Horler shows all the conviction of a session singer trilling her way through a demo while her mind focuses in on the pay cheque". CD Kritik reviews were in favour of the album, saying "It offers no surprises, but impresses with its lush pop production. All of the following numbers are consistently danceable and genuine bad-mood-killer. The producers have done the best job. By listening to [Horler's] desire for perfection, the songs are structured and powerfully made."

David Jeffries of AllMusic favoured the album, saying "Less dreamy and more thumping, the sound here isn't that far from Lady GaGa or Katy Perry's material, but with lyrics that are generally positive and lead singer Natalie Horler remaining effervescent as ever, fans will immediately be able to identify these tracks as the floor-filling act they love." HMV: Although the album comprises different genres of music compared to the previous albums 'Everytime We Touch' and 'Perfect Day' including House and R&B, it does promise fans that the "usual" Cascada anthems undertone is still present in full force. According to Canadian magazine YouThink, the album "captures a whole new audience and captivates the dance nation." They praised 'Fever' and favored 'Everytime I Hear Your Name'.

== Singles ==
"Evacuate the Dancefloor"

"Evacuate the Dancefloor" was released as the album's first single commercially in Ireland on 15 June 2009 and in the United Kingdom on 29 June 2009 by All Around the World. On 5 July 2009 it debuted at number one on the UK Singles Chart. The song has also peaked at number two in Ireland and New Zealand. The song was released by Cascada's American record label Robbins Entertainment on 21 July 2009.

"Fever"

"Fever" was the album's second single, released in Germany on 9 October 2009, with further releases in the Netherlands, Australia, New Zealand and the United States. The song served as the third single from the album in the United Kingdom (following "Dangerous", which became the second single there). It reached the top-forty in various countries, with a peak of number 31 in Germany, 32 in New Zealand, 24 in the Netherlands and 38 in Austria and entered the top 10 in France.

"Dangerous"

"Dangerous" was the third single from the album. It was first released in the UK and Ireland on 12 October 2009; it peaked at number 67 in the United Kingdom and number nine on the UK dance charts.

== Promotion ==
On 28 May 2009, an album launch party was held in London, where Natalie Horler performed the "Evacuate the Dancefloor" and along with "Breathless", "Draw the Line" and "Dangerous". "Dangerous" has the typical hands-up "Cascada style", while "Breathless" has a style more similar to that of Kelly Clarkson, and "Draw the Line" is a ballad. Horler also made appearances in nightclubs across the globe in the following months. During interviews Horler had stated that her favourite tracks from the album include "Draw The Line", "Breathless", "Fever", "Dangerous" and "Why You Had To Leave".

Cascada also performed for one night on Britney Spears' The Circus Starring Britney Spears tour.

== Track listing ==
No.	Title	Writer(s)	Length
1.	"Evacuate the Dancefloor (feat. Carlprit)"	Reuter, Peifer, Allan Eshuijs	3:27
2.	"Hold On"	Mary S. Applegate, Hague Schmitz, Billy Myer	2:56
3.	"Everytime I Hear Your Name"	Reuter, Peifer, James Kinnear, Jonathan Kinnear	3:12
4.	"Ready or Not"	Reuter, Peifer, Allan Eshuijs	3:01
5.	"Fever"	Reuter, Peifer, Andres Ballinas	3:20
6.	"Hold Your Hands Up"	Reuter, Peifer, Alistair Griffin, Benjamin Francis Leftwich	3:45
7.	"Breathless"	Reuter, Peifer, Alexis White	3:10
8.	"Dangerous"	Reuter, Peifer, Tony Cornelissen	2:59
9.	"Why You Had to Leave"	Reuter, Peifer, James Kinnear, Jonathan Kinnear, Robert Millender	3:37
10.	"What About Me"	Reuter, Peifer, Allan Eshuijs	3:11
11.	"Draw the Line" (Yanou's Candlelight Mix)	Reuter, Peifer, Tony Cornelissen	3:57

== Personnel ==
- Frank T. Wartenberg – photography
- Joe Yannece – mastering
- King & White – production, arrangement, mixing
- Manuel Reuter – production, arrangement, mixing
- Natalie Horler – vocals
- Carlprit - vocals (1)
- Rebecca Meek – design
- Yann Peifer – production, arrangement, mixing
- Allan Eshuijs – songwriting
- James Kinnear – songwriting
- Jonathan Kinnear – songwriting

== Charts ==
Chart (2009)	Peak position
Australian Albums (ARIA)	58
Austrian Albums (Ö3 Austria)	15
Belgian Albums (Ultratop Flanders)	66
Belgian Albums (Ultratop Wallonia)	60
Canadian Albums (Nielsen SoundScan)	86
Czech Albums (ČNS IFPI)	41
Dutch Albums (Album Top 100)	69
European Top 100 Albums	27
French Albums (SNEP)	19
German Albums (Offizielle Top 100)	21
Irish Albums (IRMA)	15
Japanese Albums (Oricon)	136
New Zealand Albums (RMNZ)	28
Norwegian Albums (VG-lista)	17
Scottish Albums (Official Charts)	3
Swiss Albums (Schweizer Hitparade)	36
UK Albums (Official Charts)	8
UK Dance Albums (Official Charts)	2
US Billboard 200	155
US Top Dance Albums (Billboard)	7

== Certifications ==
Region	Certification	Certified units/sales
United Kingdom (BPI)	Platinum	300,000^{‡}
^{‡} Sales+streaming figures based on certification alone.

== Release history ==
Region	Date	Format	Label	Ref
Ireland	3 July 2009	CD, digital download	All Around the World	
United Kingdom	6 July 2009	CD, digital download	All Around the World	
Germany, Austria, Switzerland	17 July 2009	CD, digital download	Zeitgeist, Zooland	
Russia	20 July 2009	CD	Universal	
United States	18 August 2009	CD, digital download	Robbins	
France	7 September 2009	CD, digital download	Universal	
Canada	15 September 2009	CD, digital download	Awesome, Robbins	
Australia	25 September 2009	CD, digital download	Universal	
Netherlands	21 September 2009	Digital download	Cloud 9 Dance	
Netherlands	28 September 2009	CD	Armada	
Japan	21 October 2009	CD, digital download	Pony Canyon	
United Kingdom	24 January 2025	LP	Back on Wax	
