= Corona (band) =

Italian Eurodance band

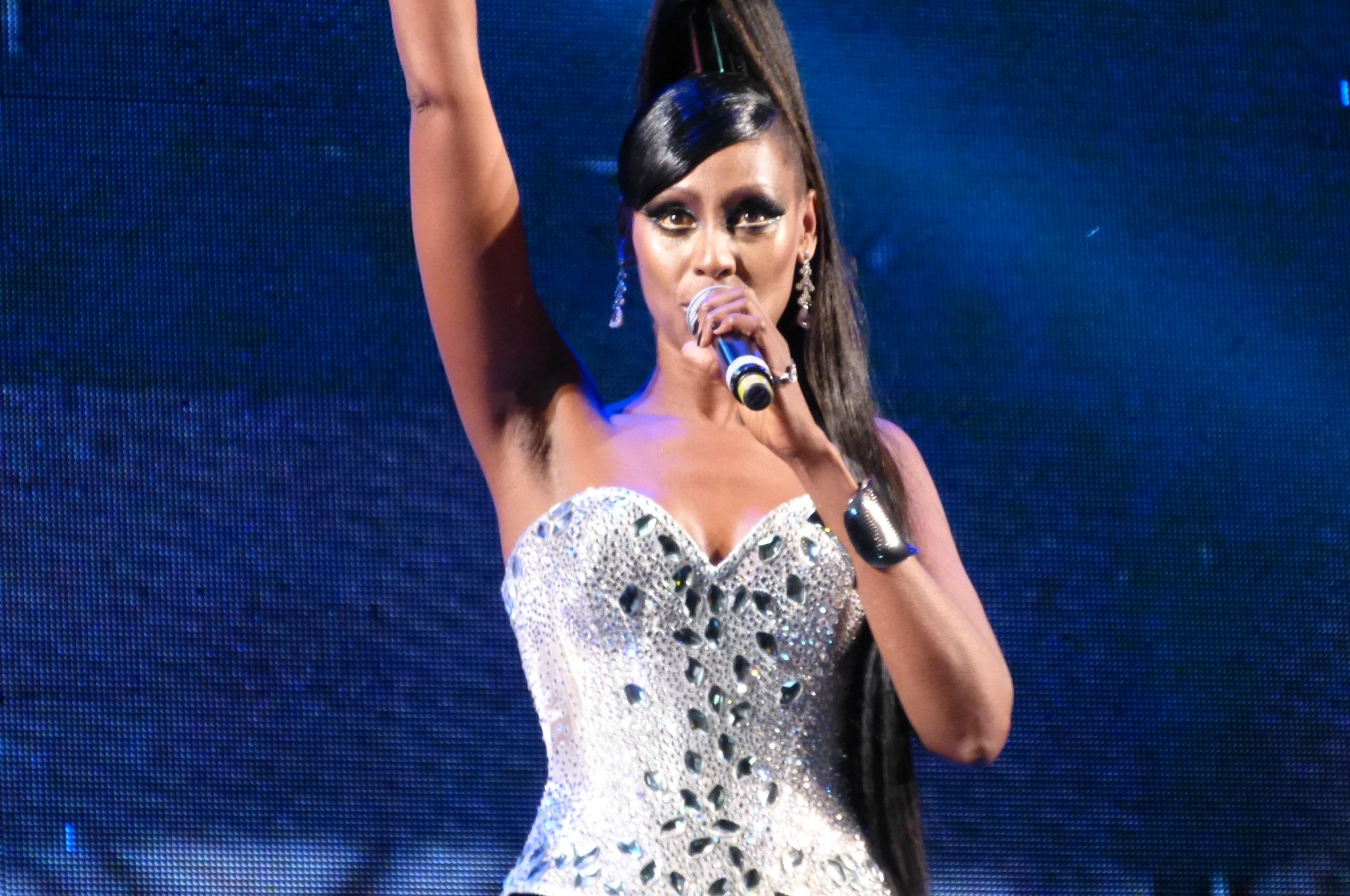
- Olga de Souza performing with Corona in 2013

Background information
- Origin: Italy
- Genres: Eurodance
- Years active: 1993–present
- Labels: DWA (Dance World Attack); ZYX
- Members: Olga Maria de Souza
- Past members: Francesco Bontempi; Jenny B; Sandy Chambers; Francesco Conte; Paolo Dughero
- Website: www.coronadance.it

Corona is an Italian Eurodance project. Initially a group formed by the Brazilian singer and model Olga Maria de Souza and producer Francesco "Checco" Bontempi (a.k.a. Lee Marrow), they found commercial success with the worldwide hits "The Rhythm of the Night" (1993) and "Baby Baby" (1995). After their second album, Bontempi left the group and was replaced by Francesco Conte and Paolo Dughero.

== History ==
=== First album: The Rhythm of the Night (1993–1996) ===
Corona's first single, "The Rhythm of the Night", was released in Italy in November 1993 on Roberto Zanetti's DWA record label and became an instant hit. It featured the voice of the Italian singer Giovanna Bersola, better known by her stage name Jenny B. It stayed at no. 1 on the Italian music chart for eight consecutive weeks, but was not released elsewhere until the following year. A remixed version of the song became a no. 2 hit in the United Kingdom in September 1994. Like several early 1990s Eurodance/Hi-NRG songs that eventually became American hits, "The Rhythm of the Night" did not become popular in the United States until well after its success had peaked in Europe. However, by spring 1995, the song was all over American radio and clubs, eventually reaching no. 11 on the Billboard Hot 100. It was later released as a track in the band's 1995 first studio album The Rhythm of the Night.

Corona followed up with the 1995 singles "Baby Baby" and "Try Me Out", with similar success. The single "I Don't Wanna Be a Star" was a moderate hit. A fifth single, "Do You Want Me", became a regional hit in discotheques in the Eastern U.S. The Rhythm of the Night album sold modestly, peaking at no. 2 on the US Top Heatseekers chart and at no. 154 on the Billboard 200.

=== Second album: Walking on Music (1997–1999) ===
In 1996, after the demise of Discomagic Records, DWA Records reorganized its staff due to internal conflicts. As a result, the production of Corona was moved from DWA Records to Bontempi's own label (World Of Music, which was also a sublabel of Discomagic).

Lead vocals for the remaining songs in the first album were by Welsh singer Sandy Chambers, who also sang on the group's second studio album, Walking On Music, released in 1998, and it featured the singles "The Power of Love" (1997), "Walking on Music" (1998), and "Magic Touch" (1998).

=== Third album: And Me U (2000–2009) ===
The group's third studio album, And Me U, was released in 2001 by Brazil's Abril Music, under the name "Corona X", and it included the singles "Good Love" and "Volcano", both released in 2000. This time the vocals were by new vocalists, the sisters Bernadette "Brandy" Jones and Bambi Jones (who died of complications from a benign tumor). Again, de Souza was just the face but still not the voice, as many people thought. Although Bontempi co-wrote some of the material in the album, he did not participate in the production and left the band. In 2004, as a tribute to de Souza's native Brazil, Corona sang "A cor dos teus olhos" ("The Colour of Your Eyes") which was distributed by 5000. De Souza described the song like an imprint of her childhood memory. It was an immediate hit. The same year "Garota Brasileira" ("Brazilian Girl"), a song with spicy samba sounds, became a hit in Japan.

Towards the end of 2005, de Souza finally sang on the records for the first time and re-emerged onto the European music scene with "Back in Time", peaking at no. 36 in the Italian charts. It was followed by "I'll Be Your Lady" (2006), the first song co-authored by de Souza.

=== Fourth album: Y Generation (2010–2016) ===
Corona's album Y Generation (2010), reached no. 1 on the Italian iTunes dance album chart. The first single was "Angel", followed by "Saturday" and "My Song". Corona's last single to date, "Super Model", was released in 2016 and reached no. 44 on the Italian Singles Chart and was later included in a re-edition of the album called Y Generation Remixed.

=== Recent years: 2020s ===
In February 2024, the band was selected alongside DJ Jad, Wlady and Ice MC to compete in the final of Una voce per San Marino 2024, the Sammarinese national selection for the Eurovision Song Contest 2024. They finally placed 14th in the contest classification, while the Spanish rock music band Megara took 1st place.

== Discography ==
=== Studio albums ===
Title	Album details	Peak chart positions								Certifications
Title	Album details	AUS	FIN	SCO	JPN	SWI	UK	US	US Heat	Certifications
The Rhythm of the Night	Released: April 1995; Label: Dance World Attack	10	30	21	1	35	18	154	2	AUS: Gold
Walking on Music	Released: June 1998; Label: RTI Music (Italy)	—	—	—	5	58	—	—	—	
And Me U	Released: July 2000; Label: Universal Records (Italy)	—	—	—	10	—	—	—	—	
Y Generation	Released: July 2010; Label: 1st Pop (Italy)	—	—	—	8	59	—	—	—	
"—" denotes items that did not chart or were not released in that territory.

=== Singles ===
Year	Title	Peak chart positions										Certifications	Album
Year	Title	ITA	AUS	AUT	FIN	FRA	GER	SPA	SWE	UK	US	Certifications	Album
1993	"The Rhythm of the Night"	1	8	6	—	3	8	3	28	2	11	AUS: Gold; FRA: Gold; GER: Gold; UK: 2× Platinum	The Rhythm of the Night
1995	"Baby Baby"	1	7	13	6	16	41	2	10	5	57	AUS: Gold; UK: Silver	The Rhythm of the Night
1995	"Try Me Out"	2	10	20	5	11	40	4	17	6	—	AUS: Gold; UK: Silver	The Rhythm of the Night
1995	"I Don't Wanna Be a Star"	2	109	25	6	18	69	1	37	22	—		The Rhythm of the Night
1996	"Megamix"	20	161	—	—	40	—	—	43	36	—		Non-album single
1997	"The Power of Love"	25	—	—	—	—	—	7	—	—	—		Walking on Music
1998	"Walking on Music"	—	—	—	—	—	—	4	—	—	—		Walking on Music
1998	"Magic Touch"	—	—	—	—	—	—	3	—	—	—		Walking on Music
2000	"Good Love"	—	—	—	—	—	—	—	—	—	—		And Me U
2000	"Volcano"	—	—	—	—	—	—	—	—	—	—		And Me U
2006	"Back in Time"	36	—	—	15	—	—	—	—	—	—		Non-album singles
2006	"I'll Be Your Lady"	—	—	—	—	—	—	—	—	—	—		Non-album singles
2008	"Baby I Don't Care"	—	—	—	—	—	—	—	—	—	—		Non-album singles
2009	"La Playa Del Sol"	—	—	—	—	—	—	—	—	—	—		Non-album singles
2010	"Angel"	—	—	—	—	—	—	—	—	—	—		Y Generation
2010	"Saturday"	—	—	—	—	—	—	—	—	—	—		Y Generation
2011	"My Song (La Lai)"	—	—	—	—	—	—	—	—	—	—		Y Generation
2012	"Hurry Up" (featuring Mikey P.)	—	—	—	—	—	—	—	—	—	—		Non-album singles
2013	"Queen of Town"	—	—	—	—	—	—	—	—	—	—		Non-album singles
2014	"Stay with Me"	—	—	—	—	—	—	—	—	—	—		Non-album singles
2015	"We Used to Love"	—	—	—	—	—	—	—	—	—	—		Non-album singles
2016	"Super Model"	—	—	—	—	—	—	—	—	—	—		Non-album singles
"—" denotes items that did not chart or were not released in that territory.
