= Jenny B =

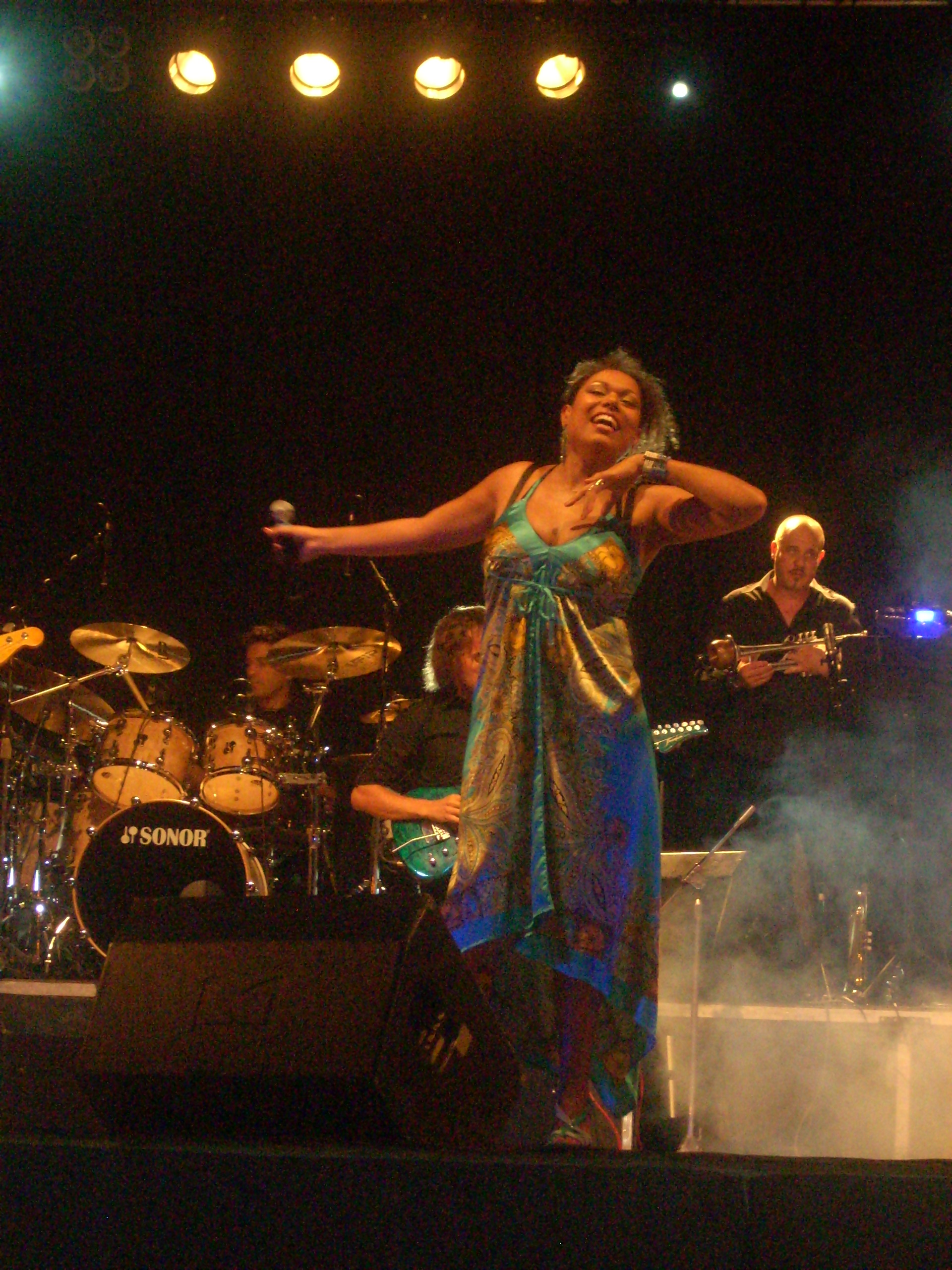
- Jenny B performing at an outdoor concert held at the Teatro Nuovo in Giardini Naxos, Sicily, 27 July 2011

Background information
- Born: Giovanna Bersola; 20 July 1972 (age 54); Catania, Sicily, Italy
- Genres: Eurodance
- Years active: 1993–present
- Website: http://www.myspace.com/jennybflip

Giovanna Bersola (born 20 July 1972), better known by her stage name Jenny B, is an Italian singer.

== Biography ==
Giovanna Bersola was born in 1972 in Catania, Sicily, Italy, to a Sicilian mother and Senegalese father. In the early years of her music career, she mostly did session work. She is best known for her feature vocal on the 1993 hit by Italian Eurodance band Corona, "The Rhythm of the Night", and also on the Italian Eurodance group Playahitty 1994 hit "The Summer Is Magic".

In 2000, she won the "Newcomers Section" and the Mia Martini Critics Award of the Sanremo Music Festival with her song, "Semplice Sai".

== Discography ==
=== Albums ===
- Come Un Sogno (2000)
- Jenny B in Concert (2007)
- Esta soy yo (2011)

=== Singles ===
- "Wanna Get Your Love" (1993)
- "There's a Bit Goin' On" (1993)
- "Semplice Sai" (2000)
- "Shine into My Life" (with Stefano Gamma) (1999)
- "Toccami l'Anima" (2000)
- "Come Un Sogno" (2000)
- "Anche Tu" (2001)
- "Ode a Celeste" (2011)
- "Canto madrigal" (2011)

=== As featured vocalist ===
- J.K. - "You Make Me Feel Good" (1992)
- J.K. - "Beat It" (1993)
- Corona - "The Rhythm of the Night" (1993)
- J.K. - "You and I" (1994)
- Nevada - "Take Me to Heaven" (1994)
- Playahitty - "The Summer Is Magic" (1994)
- Libra - "Closer to Me" (1995)
- Playahitty - "1, 2, 3! (Train with Me)" (1995)
- Red Velvet - "Lady Don't Cry" (1995)
- Funky Company - Tendency of Love (album, 1996)
- Funky Company - "Everytime" (1998)
- Gemelli Diversi - "Un attimo ancora" (1998)
- Gemelli Diversi - "Tunaizdanait" (1998)
- Benny Bee - "Waiting for You" (1999)
- S-Sense - "Gonna Get Your Love" (1999)
- Er Piotta - "La Mossa Del Giaguaro" (2000)
- Tofunk - "Alright" (2000)
- Funbeat - "A Part of Me" (2001)
- Simpson Tune - "Bring It Down" (2001)
- The Wikkamen Project - "Down on It" (2001)
- FR - "Love Is the Music" (2002)
- Alan Sorrenti - "Paradiso Beach" (2003)
- J.F.C. - "Meet Me in Paradise" (2003)
- La Perla - "The Difference Between Me & U" (2004)
- Private Show - "The Difference Between Me & You" (2004)
- Massimo Ranieri - "La voce del silenzio" (2006)
- Eric Daniel - "Old sax nu soul" (2006)
- Stylus Robb - "Step Side to Side" (2007)
- Favretto - "First Floor" (2008)
- Favretto - "To the Beat" (2008)
- Marracash - "Solo io e te" (2009)
- Alessandro Magnanini - "Secret Lover"/"Open Up Your Eyes"/"So Long, Goodbye" (2009)
- Rudeejay & Freaks Jam - "The Rhythm Is Magic" (2011)
- Afa Connection - "Found Love" (2012)
- DJ's Tribute Family - "What's Up?" (2012)
- Ultraclub 90 - "Rhythm of the Night" (2018)

Awards and achievements
| Preceded by Alex Britti with "Oggi sono io" | Sanremo Music Festival; Winner Newcomers section 2000 | Succeeded by Gazosa with "Stai con me (Forever)" |
