= The Rhythm of the Night =

1993 song by Corona

Single by Corona

from the album The Rhythm of the Night
- Released: 5 November 1993
- Genre: Eurodance; Europop; synth-pop; house
- Length: 3:33
- Label: DWA
- Songwriters: Francesco Bontempi; Annerley Emma Gordon; Giorgio Spagna; Pete Glenister; Michael Gaffey
- Producer: Francesco Bontempi

Corona singles chronology
"The Rhythm of the Night" (1993)	"Baby Baby" (1995)

Music video
- "The Rhythm of the Night" on YouTube

"The Rhythm of the Night" is a song by Italian Eurodance group Corona. It was released as their debut single in 1993 in Italy, then elsewhere the following year. The song is the title track of the group's debut studio album of the same name (1995), and was written by Francesco Bontempi, Annerley Emma Gordon, Giorgio Spagna, Pete Glenister and Mike Gaffey. It was produced by Bontempi, and the vocals were performed by Italian singer Giovanna Bersola (a.k.a. Jenny B), who is not credited on the single and does not appear in the music video. The woman who appears in the video is the group's frontwoman Olga Souza. It was directed by Giacomo de Simone and received heavy rotation on European music TV-channels.

"The Rhythm of the Night" was a worldwide hit in 1994, peaking at number one in Italy and entering the top five in most of Europe and Australasia, while in the United States, it reached number 11 on both the Billboard Hot 100 and Cash Box Top 100 charts. In 2022 and 2025, "The Rhythm of the Night" was ranked among the best dance songs of all time by Rolling Stone and Billboard magazine.

== Background and release ==
The song is credited to its producer Francesco Bontempi with Annerley Emma Gordon, Giorgio Spagna, Pete Glenister and Mike Gaffey. In 1987, the Glenister and Gaffey written song "Save Me", performed by Dutch pop duo Say When!, was released. It had originally been considered for inclusion on Madonna's Like a Prayer, but the deal fell through. "The Rhythm of the Night" borrows heavily from this track, namely the music and specifically the lyrics "Round and round we go, each time I hear you say", along with other similar lyrics shared by the two songs. As a result, an out-of-court settlement was reached and the songwriters were acknowledged as part writers of the song.

At the time she got the gig, Italian singer Giovanna Bersola suffered from stage fright, and would only be doing studio work. Brazilian singer Olga Souza would be fronting the song on stage and tour instead of Bersola, as well as in its accompanying music video. Bersola said in a 2021 interview, "The studio was safe for me, it was no windows, just me and the music. It was a time when dance and euro house music was very prolific in Europe and I was living in Italy at the time, so I was singing three or four songs a day as a session voice." Regarding Souza fronting the group instead of her and the fact that they didn't use Bersola's image on the single cover, she felt that it suited her, "That gave me the freedom to be absolutely no one." Bersola is no longer suffering from stage fright and now lives in New Zealand. "The Rhythm of the Night" was released in 1993 in Italy, and the following year, it was released internationally.

== Critical reception ==
In August 1994, Scottish Aberdeen Evening Express complimented "The Rhythm of the Night" as "a great Euro pop record" that "has been a top 10 hit in every European country." Larry Flick from Billboard magazine wrote, "Recent No. 1 U.K./European hit is finally issued domestically, and it already appears to be on the road to meeting with similar success here." He explained, "Thumping Italo disco beats support glossy faux-rave synths and a diva vocal that is forceful without being overly aggressive. A wildly catchy and repetitive chorus already has begun to woo radio programmers in several major markets on import." Dave Sholin from the Gavin Report reported, "Key programmers are catching on to this one and fast – for one very good reason: It's hot! Coming off a number one run in the U.K., Corona is set up to blowout Stateside." In his UK chart commentary, James Masterton felt it's "more conventional dance though just has the edge for the moment".

Pan-European magazine Music & Media wrote, "Nocturnal dance party animals and daytime radio programmers sweat to the pulsating Euro beat. When the mistress of seduction hits the mike, only a glass of Corona can cool you down." Alan Jones from Music Week named it an "extremely commercial pop hit from the Continent." He also found that the more concise Rapino edit is also assailing ears on radio, and its concise form will win it many admirers." John Kilgo from The Network Forty described it as a "uptempo high-energy dance number" that is "set to explode." Stephen Dalton from NME wrote, "Anal snobs who dismiss all Europop out of hand are clearly deaf to sensual, rollicking beauties like Corona's 'Rhythm of the Night' or The Real McCoy's 'Run Away'". An editor from the Record Mirror Dance Update stated, "Very Euro housey but undeniably huge". In his weekly column, Record Mirror editor James Hamilton named it a "Olga De Souza cooed Euro smash". Jonathan Bernstein from Spin complimented it as "magnificent", while Paul Sexton from The Times declared it as an "hedonistic anthem".

== Chart performance ==
"The Rhythm of the Night" reached number one in Italy for eight consecutive weeks. In Europe, it was a top-10 hit in several countries, including Austria, Denmark, France, Germany, Iceland, Ireland, the Netherlands, Spain, Switzerland and the United Kingdom. In the UK, "The Rhythm of the Night" peaked at number two on the UK Singles Chart on 18 September 1994, during its third week on the chart. It spent a total of 19 weeks inside the UK top 100. In Germany, it peaked at number eight for two weeks in June 1994 and spent 25 weeks within the German Singles Chart, before leaving in December that year. Additionally, the single was a top-20 hit in Belgium and a top-30 hit in Sweden. It entered the Eurochart Hot 100 at number 63 on 12 February and slowly climbed up to number five on 17 September.

Outside Europe, "The Rhythm of the Night" reached number 11 on both the US Billboard Hot 100 and the Cash Box Top 100 charts. It also peaked at numbers eight and seven in Australia and New Zealand, respectively. The song peaked at number one on the French dance chart, number two on the Canadian RPM Dance/Urban chart and the European Dance Radio chart, number three on the UK Dance Chart, and number seven on the Billboard Dance Club Play chart. In Europe, "The Rhythm of the Night" entered the European Border Breakers airplay chart at 21 on 9 April due to crossover airplay in West, Central, North and South-West Europe—it peaked at number four on 5 November. In the US, the song was a top-10 hit on radio as well, peaking at number nine in the Billboard Top 40/Mainstream chart and at number seven on the Billboard Top 40/Rhythm-Crossover chart.

== Music video ==
The music video for "The Rhythm of the Night" was directed by Italian director Giacomo de Simone and filmed in Italy. In the video, which was filmed in Viareggio, a city and comune in northern Tuscany, Corona's frontwoman Olga Souza performs among spinning carousels in an amusement park. Other times, she performs at locations in the city. Throughout the video, different symbols and computer generated images appears. "The Rhythm of the Night" was A-listed on both the French and German music television channels MCM and VIVA in July and August 1994. The video also received "prime break out" rotation on MTV Europe.

== Impact and legacy ==
“It’s a beautiful thing, I’m happy to be in so many people’s hearts and beautiful memories about those years when they were going out and dancing. It’s a happy place for me.”

— Giovanna Bersola talking to RNZ about the song.

"The Rhythm of the Night" was awarded one of BMI's Pop Awards in 1996, honoring the songwriters, composers and music publishers of the song.

The song was featured prominently in the closing scene of the 1999 film Beau Travail, with the film's protagonist engaging in a frenzied solo dance performance to the song on an empty nightclub stage. The song was also featured in Grand Theft Auto V on the fictional Non-Stop Pop FM radio station .

In 2013, Vibe ranked it number nine in their list of "Before EDM: 30 Dance Tracks from the '90s That Changed the Game". In 2014, Idolator ranked it number 25 on their list of "The 50 Best Pop Singles of 1994". Bradley Stern described it as a "spacey synth-pop jam" and "true staple of early '90s club anthems". He concluded, "As soon as that almighty call to arms rings out (This is the rhythm of the night!), 20 years later, there's still no choice but to become a slave to the rhythm all over again." In 2017, BuzzFeed ranked it number two in "The 101 Greatest Dance Songs of the '90s" list. Stopera and Galindo wrote, "'The Rhythm of the Night' is not only a song, it's a lifestyle. It's a triumph. A feeling. Pure joy. This song will take you places!!" Same year, Redbull.com ranked it number nine in their list of 9 one-hit-wonders from the 90s that still stand up today.

In 2022, "The Rhythm of the Night" was ranked number 68 in Rolling Stone's list of "200 Greatest Dance Songs of All Time". Same year, The Guardian ranked it number 50 in their "The 70 Greatest No 2 Singles – Ranked!". Alexis Petridis said, "Nineties Euro pop-house was seldom a finely wrought artistic enterprise, but just occasionally, it hit on something incredible. The work of shadowy Italian producers and British songwriters for hire, promoted by a “singer” who didn’t appear on the song itself, 'The Rhythm of the Night' perfectly captures the anticipatory excitement of night out about to happen." In March 2025, Billboard magazine ranked it number 34 in their list of "The 100 Best Dance Songs of All Time", writing, "The song's endless hooks – the synth riff, that massive chorus – taps into universal urges to dance, and transcended cultures and languages, particularly in the case of a hilarious misheard DJ request from one Dominican radio listener who wanted to hear the song with the lyrics, "Are those Reebok or Nike?"."

=== Accolades ===
Year	Publisher	Country	Accolade	Rank
1996	BMI	United States	"BMI Pop Awards"	*
2011	MTV Dance	United Kingdom	"The 100 Biggest 90's Dance Anthems of All Time"	98
2013	Vibe	United States	"Before EDM: 30 Dance Tracks from the '90s That Changed the Game"	9
2014	Idolator	United States	"The 50 Best Pop Singles of 1994"	25
2017	BuzzFeed	United States	"The 101 Greatest Dance Songs of the '90s"	2
2017	Redbull.com	United States	"9 of the Most Enduring One-Hit Wonders of the '90s"	9
2021	Time Out	United Kingdom	"The 50 Best Uses of Songs in Movies"	12
2022	The Guardian	United Kingdom	"The 70 Greatest No 2 Singles – Ranked!"	50
2022	Rolling Stone	United States	"200 Greatest Dance Songs of All Time"	68
2023	Fordham Observer	United States	"Women in Music: '90s Dance Music"	*
2024	MTV 90s	United Kingdom	"Top 50 Rhythms of Eurodance"	5
2025	Billboard	United States	"The 100 Best Dance Songs of All Time"	34

== Track listings ==
=== Original version ===
- CD single
1. "The Rhythm of the Night" (radio edit) (4:24)
2. "The Rhythm of the Night" (club mix) (5:31)
- 7-inch single
1. "The Rhythm of the Night" (Rapino Brothers radio version)
2. "The Rhythm of the Night" (Original Italian club mix)
- 12-inch maxi – Italy, Spain, Germany
1. "The Rhythm of the Night" (club mix) (5:31)
2. "The Rhythm of the Night" (radio edit) (4:20)
3. "The Rhythm of the Night" (RBX E.U.R.O. mix) (5:05)
4. "The Rhythm of the Night" (extended 2# groove mix) (5:30)
5. "The Rhythm of the Night" (a capella) (5:25)
- 12-inch maxi – UK
1. "The Rhythm of the Night" (Luvdup Burning Bush vocal mix) (7:59)
2. "The Rhythm of the Night" (Luvdup Tequila on a Spoon mix) (5:57)
3. "The Rhythm of the Night" (Rapino Brothers Let's Get Fizzical piano mix) (5:06)
4. "The Rhythm of the Night" (Lee Marrow remix) (6:24)
- 12-inch maxi – US
1. "Rhythm of the Night" (R.B.X. Euro mix) (5:05)
2. "Rhythm of the Night" (Rapino Brothers "Let's Get Fizzical" piano mix) (5:06)
3. "Rhythm of the Night" (Lee Marrow remix) (6:24)
4. "Rhythm of the Night" (Luvdup "Burning Bush" vocal mix) (7:59)
5. "Rhythm of the Night" (new extended remix) (7:34)
- CD maxi – Germany
1. "The Rhythm of the Night" (radio edit) (4:20)
2. "The Rhythm of the Night" (club mix) (5:31)
3. "The Rhythm of the Night" (RBX Euro mix) (5:05)
4. "The Rhythm of the Night" (ext.2 groove mix) (5:30)
5. "The Rhythm of the Night" (a cappella) (5:31)
- CD maxi – US
1. "The Rhythm of the Night" (Rapino Brothers "Let's Get Fizzical" piano mix) (5:06)
2. "The Rhythm of the Night" (Luvdup "Burning Bush" vocal mix) (7:59)
3. "The Rhythm of the Night" (R.B.X. Euro mix) (5:05)
4. "The Rhythm of the Night" (Lee Marrow remix) (6:24)
5. "The Rhythm of the Night" (Space remix) (6:29)
- CD maxi – UK
1. "The Rhythm of the Night" (Rapino Brothers radio version) (3:33)
2. "The Rhythm of the Night" (Luvdup 'Burning Bush' vocal mix) (7:59)
3. "The Rhythm of the Night" (Rapino Brothers 'Lets Get Fizzical' piano mix) (5:06)
4. "The Rhythm of the Night" (Lee Marrow remix) (6:24)
5. "The Rhythm of the Night" (extended Italian remix) (5:59)
6. "The Rhythm of the Night" (Luvdup 'Tequila on a Spoon' dub) (5:57)
7. "The Rhythm of the Night" (R.B.X. Euro mix) (4:50)
- CD maxi – Italy, Canada
1. "The Rhythm of the Night" (radio edit) (4:20)
2. "The Rhythm of the Night" (club mix) (5:31)
3. "The Rhythm of the Night" (Space remix) (6:29)
4. "The Rhythm of the Night" (Lee Marrow remix) (6:30)
5. "The Rhythm of the Night" (Mephisto remix) (4:41)
6. "The Rhythm of the Night" (new extended remix) (7:34)
7. "The Rhythm of the Night" (R.B. X. Euro mix) (5:05)
- CD maxi – France
1. "The Rhythm of the Night" (radio edit) (4:24)
2. "The Rhythm of the Night" (club mix) (5:31)
3. "The Rhythm of the Night" (RBX E.U.R.O. mix) (5:08)
4. "The Rhythm of the Night" (extended 2° groove mix) (5:34)
- CD maxi – Australia
1. "The Rhythm of the Night" (radio edit) (4:24)
2. "The Rhythm of the Night" (Space remix) (6:30)
3. "The Rhythm of the Night" (Lee Marrow remix) (6:32)
4. "The Rhythm of the Night" (new extended remix) (7:30)

=== Remixes version ===
- 12-inch maxi 1 – Italy
1. "The Rhythm of the Night" (Space remix) (6:29)
2. "The Rhythm of the Night" (Space remix) (6:29)
3. "The Rhythm of the Night" (new extended remix) (7:34)
4. "The Rhythm of the Night" (club groove extended remix) (6:56)
- 12-inch maxi 2 – Italy, Spain
1. "The Rhythm of the Night" (Lee Marrow remix) (6:30)
2. "The Rhythm of the Night" (Lee Marrow airplay edit) (4:22)
3. "The Rhythm of the Night" (Mephisto remix) (4:41)
4. "The Rhythm of the Night" (R.B.X. mix) (5:05)
- 12-inch maxi – UK Remixes – Italy
1. "The Rhythm of the Night" (extended mix / Rapino Bros) (5:09)
2. "The Rhythm of the Night" (7-inch single mix) (3:33)
3. "The Rhythm of the Night" (Burning Bush vocal mix) (8:02)
4. "The Rhythm of the Night" (Dub Mix Tequila with a Spoon) (5:58)
5. "The Rhythm of the Night" (original version) (5:31)
- 12-inch maxi – Spain
1. "The Rhythm of the Night" (Space remix featuring Ice MC) (6:29)
2. "The Rhythm of the Night" (Space remix) (6:29)
3. "The Rhythm of the Night" (new extended remix) (7:34)
4. "The Rhythm of the Night" (club groove remix) (6:50)
- 12-inch maxi – Germany
1. "The Rhythm of the Night" (Space remix) (6:29)
2. "The Rhythm of the Night" (Red Light remix) (7:34)
3. "The Rhythm of the Night" (club groove extended mix) (5:56)
4. "The Rhythm of the Night" (Lee Marrow rmx) (6:30)
- 12-inch maxi 1 – Canada
1. "The Rhythm of the Night" (club mix) (5:30)
2. "The Rhythm of the Night" (R.B.X. Euro mix) (5:05)
3. "Take Control" – by DJ BoBo (club dance mix) (5:56)
4. "Move Your Feet" – by DJ Bobo (dance mix) (3:45)
- 12-inch maxi 2 – Canada
1. "Think About the Way" – by Ice MC (extended mix) (7:08)
2. "Think About the Way" – by Ice MC (radio mix) (4:16)
3. "The Rhythm of the Night" (Lee Marrow remix) (6:30)
4. "The Rhythm of the Night" (Mark Roberts Rampage! remix) (7:09)
- CD maxi – Germany
1. "The Rhythm of the Night" (space rmx feat. Ice MC) (6:29)
2. "The Rhythm of the Night" (Red Light rmx) (7:34)
3. "The Rhythm of the Night" (club groove extended rmx) (5:56)
4. "The Rhythm of the Night" (Lee Marrow rmx) (6:30)
5. "The Rhythm of the Night" (Mephisto rmx) (4:41)
6. "The Rhythm of the Night" (R.B.X. Euro mix) (5:05)
7. "The Rhythm of the Night" (original single mix) (4:20)
- CD maxi – Original Italian mixes – UK
1. "The Rhythm of the Night" (original radio version – UK edit) (4:08)
2. "The Rhythm of the Night" (R.B.X. Euro mix) (5:05)
3. "The Rhythm of the Night" (new extended remix) (7:34)
4. "The Rhythm of the Night" (Space remix) (6:29)
- CD maxi – France
1. "The Rhythm of the Night" (Lee Marrow airplay edit) (4:22)
2. "The Rhythm of the Night" (Lee Marrow remix) (6:30)
3. "The Rhythm of the Night" (Mephisto remix) (4:41)
4. "The Rhythm of the Night" (RBX E.U.R.O. mix) (5:05)
- CD maxi – UK Remixes – Germany
1. "The Rhythm of the Night" (7-inch single version) (3:33)
2. "The Rhythm of the Night" (extended mix / Rapino Bros) (5:09)
3. "The Rhythm of the Night" (Burning Bush vocal mix) (8:02)
4. "The Rhythm of the Night" (dub mix Tequila with a Spoon) (5:58)
5. "The Rhythm of the Night" (original version) (5:31)

== Charts ==
=== Weekly charts ===
Chart (1994–1995)	Peak position
Australia (ARIA)	8
Austria (Ö3 Austria Top 40)	6
Belgium (Ultratop 50 Flanders)	13
Canada Dance/Urban (RPM)	2
Denmark (IFPI)	4
Europe (Eurochart Hot 100)	5
Europe (European Dance Radio)	2
Europe (European Hit Radio)	37
France (SNEP)	3
France Dance (Top Dance)	1
Germany (GfK)	8
Iceland (Íslenski Listinn Topp 40)	4
Ireland (IRMA)	3
Israel (Israeli Singles Chart)	2
Italy (Musica e dischi)	1
Netherlands (Dutch Top 40)	6
Netherlands (Single Top 100)	5
New Zealand (Recorded Music NZ)	7
Scottish Singles Sales (Official Charts)	2
Spain (AFYVE)	3
Sweden (Sverigetopplistan)	28
Switzerland (Schweizer Hitparade)	4
UK Singles (Official Charts)	2
UK Dance (Official Charts)	3
UK Airplay (Music Week)	3
UK Dance (Music Week)	3
UK Club Chart (Music Week)	16
US Billboard Hot 100	11
US Dance Club Play (Billboard)	7
US Maxi-Singles Sales (Billboard)	5
US Top 40/Mainstream (Billboard)	9
US Top 40/Rhythm-Crossover (Billboard)	7
US Cash Box Top 100	11

Chart (2026)	Peak position
Russia Streaming (TopHit) Simon from Deep Divas remix	93

=== Year-end charts ===
Chart (1994)	Position
Australia (ARIA)	43
Belgium (Ultratop 50 Flanders)	62
Canada Dance/Urban (RPM)	9
Europe (Eurochart Hot 100)	15
Europe (European Dance Radio)	3
France (SNEP)	9
Germany (Media Control)	34
Iceland (Íslenski Listinn Topp 40)	46
Israel (Israeli Singles Chart)	34
Italy (Musica e dischi)	1
Netherlands (Dutch Top 40)	55
Netherlands (Single Top 100)	45
Switzerland (Schweizer Hitparade)	10
UK Singles (OCC)	13
UK Airplay (Music Week)	48

Chart (1995)	Position
Brazil (Crowley)	18
US Billboard Hot 100	54
US Maxi-Singles Sales (Billboard)	27
US Top 40/Mainstream (Billboard)	27
US Top 40/Rhythm-Crossover (Billboard)	38

== Certifications ==
Region	Certification	Certified units/sales
Australia (ARIA)	Gold	35,000^{^}
Denmark (IFPI Danmark)	Gold	45,000^{‡}
France (SNEP)	Gold	250,000^{*}
Germany (BVMI)	Gold	250,000^{^}
Italy (FIMI)	Platinum	100,000^{‡}
New Zealand (RMNZ)	Platinum	30,000^{‡}
Spain (Promusicae)	Gold	25,000^{^}
United Kingdom (BPI)	2× Platinum	1,200,000^{‡}
Summaries
^{*} Sales figures based on certification alone.^{^} Shipments figures based on certification alone.^{‡} Sales+streaming figures based on certification alone.

== Release history ==
Region	Date	Format(s)	Label(s)	Ref.
Italy	5 November 1993	12-inch vinyl	DWA	
Australia	18 July 1994	CD; cassette	Dance Pool	
United Kingdom	30 August 1994	12-inch vinyl; CD; cassette	WEA	

== Cascada version ==
"The Rhythm of the Night"

Single by Cascada

from the album The Best of Cascada
- Released: 22 June 2012
- Length: 3:20
- Label: Zooland
- Songwriters: Francesco Bontempi; Annerley Gordon; Giorgio Spagna; Pete Glenister; Mike Gaffey
- Producers: DJ Manian; Yanou

Cascada singles chronology
"Summer of Love" (2012)	"The Rhythm of the Night" (2012)	"Glorious" (2013)

Music video
- "The Rhythm of the Night" on YouTube

On 2 June 2012, German dance group Cascada performed "The Rhythm of the Night" at the opening of a bar, leading to speculation that the song would be the group's new single. The single was produced by DJ Manian and Yanou, and released on 22 June. It was a top ten hit in Austria, but only reached the top 30 in the group's native Germany. The following year, it was included on their compilation album, The Best of Cascada (2013).

=== Track list ===
- Digital download
1. "The Rhythm of the Night" (radio edit) – 3:22
2. "The Rhythm of the Night" (Crew Cardinal radio edit) – 3:35
3. "The Rhythm of the Night" (Ryan T. & Rick M. radio edit) – 3:58
4. "The Rhythm of the Night" (extended mix) – 4:44
5. "The Rhythm of the Night" (Crew Cardinal remix) – 5:50
6. "The Rhythm of the Night" (Ryan T. & Rick M. remix) – 5:43

=== Music video ===
The music video for the song was directed by Iulian Moga, the Romanian film director noted for making music videos. It was released on 22 June, first to those who had 'liked' Cascada's official page on Facebook, then on general release. The video shows Dutch rapper Nicci, singing his part of the song, and Horler in a yellow jacket, rocking a rich old woman's mansion. The party in the house also comes with police officers, that turn out to be strippers.

=== Charts ===
Chart (2012)	Peak position
Austria (Ö3 Austria Top 40)	9
Germany (GfK)	26
Switzerland (Schweizer Hitparade)	22

== Other cover versions and samplings ==
In 2008, the song was covered by Dutch pop group Hermes House Band, and reached number 16 in France and number 55 in Germany.

In 2013, British band Bastille recorded "Of the Night", a medley of "The Rhythm of the Night" and "Rhythm Is a Dancer" by Snap!.

In 2015, the song was covered by American DJs 3LAU and Nom de Strip and British singer Estelle.

Hattie Webb of the Webb Sisters covered the song; her version was used in the McDonald's advert campaign "We Are Awake" and her EP Mouth of the Sea, released on 11 November 2016.

Jenny B, who sang on the original track, sang the cover used on the 2018 video game Just Dance 2019.

In 2018, the song was covered in bigroom version by Dutch DJ Maurice West and Hungarian duo SaberZ.

In 2019, the chorus of the song was sampled in the Black Eyed Peas and J Balvin's "Ritmo (Bad Boys for Life)", which appeared on the soundtrack of the 2020 film Bad Boys for Life.

== See also ==
- List of number-one hits of 1994 (Italy)
- "Of the Night"
