= Cold Chisel discography =

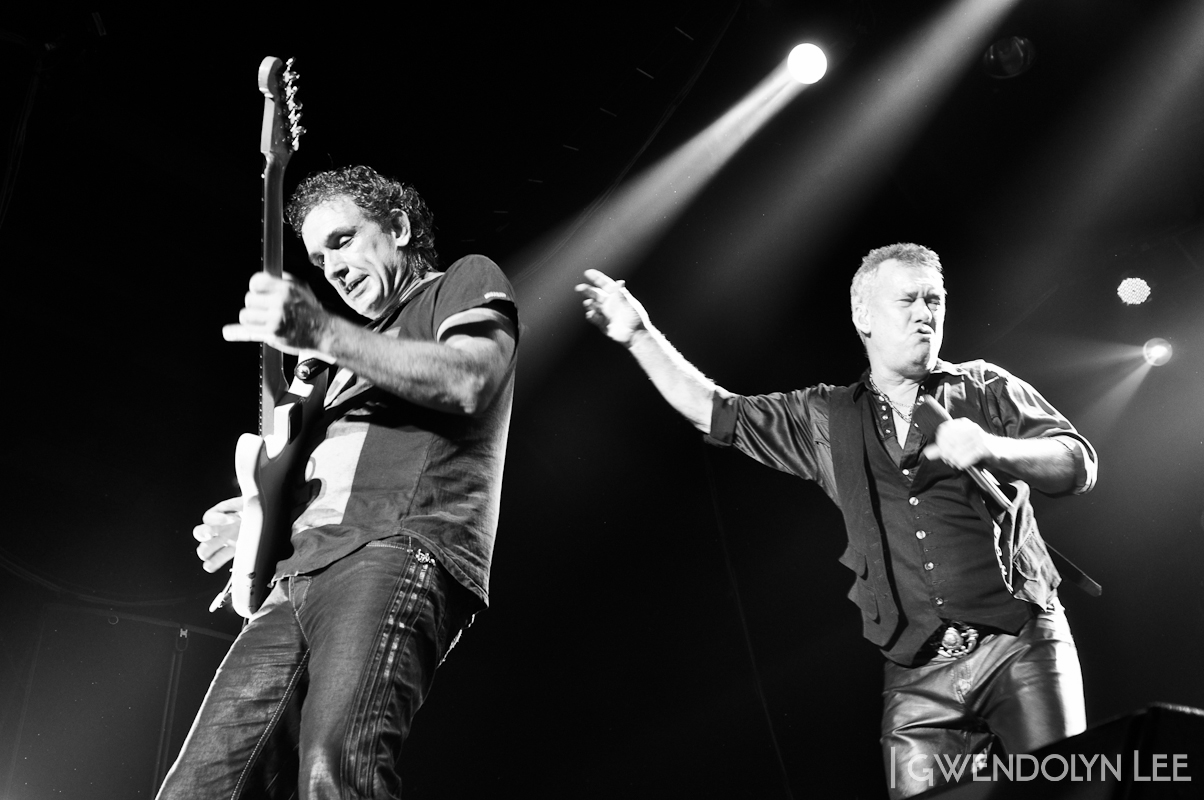
- Moss and Barnes, 2012
- Studio albums: 9
- EPs: 3
- Live albums: 10
- Compilation albums: 12
- Singles: 32

Cold Chisel are an Australian pub rock band. The band have released nine studio albums. The band were included into the ARIA Hall of Fame in 1993.

The group have achieved six number-one albums on the ARIA Charts, the latest being their 2024 compilation 50 Years – The Best Of.

== Albums ==
=== Studio albums ===
Title	Details	Peak chart positions			Certifications
Title	Details	AUS	NZ	US	Certifications
Cold Chisel	Released: 24 April 1978; Label: Atlantic	31	—	—	AUS: Gold
Breakfast at Sweethearts	Released: February 1979; Label: Atlantic	4	—	—	AUS: Platinum
East	Released: 2 June 1980; Label: WEA	2	32	171	AUS: 5× Platinum
Circus Animals	Released: 8 March 1982; Label: WEA	1	1	—	ARIA: 3× Platinum; RMNZ: Platinum
Twentieth Century	Released: April 1984; Label: WEA	1	18	—	ARIA: 2× Platinum
The Last Wave of Summer	Released: 9 October 1998; Label: Mushroom	1	13	—	ARIA: 2× Platinum
No Plans	Released: 6 April 2012; Label: Warner Music	2	14	—	ARIA: Gold
The Perfect Crime	Released: 2 October 2015; Label: Cold Chisel Music, Universal Music Australia	2	7	—	ARIA: Gold
Blood Moon	Released: 6 December 2019; Label: Cold Chisel Music, Universal Music Australia	1	—	—	
"—" denotes releases that did not chart.

=== Live albums ===
Title	Details	Peak chart positions		Certifications
Title	Details	AUS	NZ	Certifications
Swingshift	Released: April 1981; Label: WEA	1	9	ARIA: 3× Platinum
Barking Spiders Live: 1983	Released: December 1984; Label: WEA	14	—	
The Last Stand (live soundtrack)	Released: October 1992; Label: EastWest	8	—	ARIA: Gold
Ringside	Released: 14 November 2003; Label: Warner Music	16	—	ARIA: Gold; RMNZ: Gold
The Live Tapes Vol. 1	Released: 22 November 2013; Label: Cold Chisel Music, Universal Music Australia	27	—	
The Live Tapes Vol. 2	Released: 14 November 2014; Label: Cold Chisel Music, Universal Music Australia	19	—	
The Live Tapes Vol. 3	Released: 2 December 2016; Label: Cold Chisel Music, Universal Music Australia	11	—	
The Live Tapes Vol. 4	Released: 10 November 2017; Label: Cold Chisel Music, Universal Music Australia	9	—	
The Live Tapes Vol. 5	Released: 11 December 2020; Label: Cold Chisel Music, Universal Music Australia	5	—	
The Big Five-O Live	Released: 8 August 2025; Label: Cold Chisel Music, Universal Music Australia	4	—	
"—" denotes releases that did not chart.

=== Compilation albums ===
Title	Details	Peak chart positions		Certifications
Title	Details	AUS	NZ	Certifications
Northbound: The Best of Cold Chisel	Released: 1983 (Europe); Label: Line	—N/a	—N/a	
Radio Songs: A Best of Cold Chisel	Released: 1985; Label: WEA	3	36	
Razor Songs	Released: 1987; Label: WEA	11	—	ARIA: Platinum
Chisel	Released: September 1991; Label: Warner Music Group	3	16	ARIA: 9× Platinum
Teenage Love	Released: October 1994; Label: Warner Music Group	6	—	ARIA: Gold
The Studio Sessions 1978–1984	Released: 6 December 1999; Label: Warner Music Group; Seven-disc, limited edition box set	—	—	
Standing on the Outside	Released: 2007; Label: Rhino; Tribute/Compilation albums	2	—	ARIA: Platinum
Never Before	Released: 21 July 2011; Label: Cold Chisel; Digital only	—	—	
Besides	Released: 21 July 2011; Label: Cold Chisel; Digital only	—	—	
Covered	Released: 19 August 2011; Label: Cold Chisel; Digital only	82	—	
The Best of Cold Chisel: All for You	Released: 14 October 2011; Label: WEA	2	—	ARIA: 4× Platinum; RMNZ: Platinum
50 Years – The Best Of	Released: 23 August 2024; Label: Universal Music Group	1	23	RMNZ: Gold
"—" denotes releases that did not chart.

== EPs ==
Title	Details	Peak chart positions	Certifications
Title	Details	AUS	Certifications
You're Thirteen, You're Beautiful, and You're Mine	Released: November 1978; Label: Elektra	38	ARIA: Gold
Triple J – Live at the Wireless 29.3.77	Released: 2011; Label:	—	
Triple J – Live in St Leonards Park 28.5.78	Released: 2011; Label:	—	

== Singles ==
Year	Single	Peak chart positions		Certifications	Album
Year	Single	AUS	NZ	Certifications	Album
1978	"Khe Sanh"	41 (Note: "Khe Sanh" originally peaked at number 41 in 1978. It re-entered the Australian Singles Chart at a new peak of number 40 in August 2011.)	—	RMNZ: 3× Platinum	Cold Chisel
1978	"Goodbye (Astrid Goodbye)"	65	—		Breakfast at Sweethearts
1979	"Breakfast at Sweethearts"	63	—		Breakfast at Sweethearts
1979	"Shipping Steel"	— (Note: "Shipping Steel" received a limited release of 500 copies)	—		Breakfast at Sweethearts
1979	"Choirgirl"	14	—	RMNZ: Gold	East
1980	"Cheap Wine"	8	—	RMNZ: Platinum	East
1980	"My Baby"	40	—	RMNZ: Gold	East
1980	"Knockin' on Heaven's Door"	— (Note: "Knockin' on Heaven's Door" received a limited release)	—		Swingshift
1981	"You Got Nothing I Want"	12	—		Circus Animals
1982	"Forever Now"	4	2	RMNZ: 2× Platinum	Circus Animals
1982	"When the War Is Over"	25	—	RMNZ: Platinum	Circus Animals
1983	"Hold Me Tight" / "No Sense"	14	—		Twentieth Century
1984	"Saturday Night"	11	—		Twentieth Century
1984	"Twentieth Century" / "Only One"	91	—		Twentieth Century
1984	"Flame Trees"	26	—	RMNZ: Platinum	Twentieth Century
1991	"Misfits"	55	—		Chisel
1994	"Hands Out of My Pocket"	9	—		Teenage Love
1994	"Nothing But You"	16	—		Teenage Love
1995	"Yesterdays"	23	—		Teenage Love
1998	"The Things I Love in You"	10	43	ARIA: Gold	The Last Wave of Summer
1998	"Water into Wine"	46	—		The Last Wave of Summer
1999	"Way Down"	63	—		The Last Wave of Summer
2011	"All for You"	80	—		The Best of Cold Chisel: All for You
2012	"Everybody"	—	—		No Plans
2015	"Lost"	92	—		The Perfect Crime
2015	"The Backroom"	—	—		The Perfect Crime
2016	"Long Dark Road"	—	—		The Perfect Crime
2019	"Getting the Band Back Together"	—	—		Blood Moon
2019	"I Hit the Wall"	—	—		Blood Moon
2020	"Killing Time"	—	—		Blood Moon
2024	"You've Got to Move"	—	—		50 Years – The Best Of

=== Other certified songs ===
Single	Certifications	Album
"Bow River"	RMNZ: Gold	Circus Animals

== Video albums ==
Title	Details	Certification
Seeing Is Believing	Released: 1986; Label: WEA Music Video (WMV516)	
Last Stand	Released: 1992; Label: Warner Music Vision (450990740-3)	ARIA: 2× Platinum
Vision	Released: 2002; Label: Warner Music Vision (0927409252)/(CCDVD001)	ARIA: 2× Platinum
Ringside The Movie	Released: 2003; Label: Warner Music Vision (5046723882)/(CCDVD003)	
Rockplalast	Released: 2007; Label: Warner Vision Australia (5144218202)/(CCDVD002)	ARIA: Platinum
The Best of Cold Chisel – Vision	Released: 2011; Label: Universal (CCDVD004)	
The Live Tapes – Vol. 1	Released: 2013; Label: Universal (CCDVD005)	ARIA: Platinum
