= The Best of Cold Chisel: All for You =

Greatest hits album by Cold Chisel
- Released: 14 October 2011
- Recorded: 1978–2011
- Genre: Rock; blues; classic rock
- Length: 73:28
- Label: Warner Music
- Producer: Cold Chisel; Kevin Shirley; Mark Opitz; Nash Chambers; Peter Walker; Richard Batchens

Cold Chisel chronology
| Covered (2011) | The Best of Cold Chisel: All for You (2011) | No Plans (2012) |

The Best of Cold Chisel: All for You is a greatest hits album released in October 2011 by Australian rock band, Cold Chisel. It debuted at No. 2 in Australia. A limited edition included a bonus disc that featured a dozen of the band's most loved covers.

A deluxe edition was released on 28 September 2018.

In 2019, the album was certified 4× Platinum in Australia.

== Background ==
Following the death of the group's drummer, Steve Prestwich in 2011, Jimmy Barnes and company regrouped for their first new compositions in over 13 years. The album includes two new tracks, "All for You" and "HQ454 Monroe" and 18 greatest hits. The greatest hits tracks were chosen by their fans who voted for their favourites on their website.

The album's full track listing was announced on their website on 25 September 2011.

== Reception ==
Professional ratings
Review scores
| Source | Rating |
|---|---|
| AllMusic | 3.5/5 stars |
| The AU Review | 9/10 |

Anna-Maria Megalogenis from The AU Review gave the album 9/10, saying: "It is apparent that Cold Chisel produced some damn good Aussie pub rock songs, rich with lyrical imagery (penned mostly by keyboardist Don Walker), easy to sing along to and songs tinged with melancholia". She added, "Words fail to capture how damn good this album is".

Jon O'Brien from AllMusic wrote: "The Adelaide quintet's tales of excess have often overshadowed their musical output, but "All for You" is a labor of love proving that they deserve their legendary status.

== Track listing ==
=== 2011 release ===
CD 1
| No. | Title | Writer(s) | Album | Length |
|---|---|---|---|---|
| 1. | "Standing on the Outside" | Don Walker | East | 2:56 |
| 2. | "Flame Trees" | Steve Prestwich; Walker | Twentieth Century | 4:24 |
| 3. | "Khe Sanh" | Walker | Cold Chisel | 4:10 |
| 4. | "When the War Is Over" | Prestwich | Circus Animals | 4:25 |
| 5. | "Cheap Wine" | Walker | East | 3:25 |
| 6. | "Bow River" | Ian Moss | Circus Animals | 4:22 |
| 7. | "Rising Sun" | Jimmy Barnes | East | 3:27 |
| 8. | "Choirgirl" | Walker | East | 3:25 |
| 9. | "All for You" | Walker | The Best of Cold Chisel: All for You | 4:57 |
| 10. | "Saturday Night" | Walker | Twentieth Century | 4:21 |
| 11. | "Forever Now" | Prestwich | Circus Animals | 4:27 |
| 12. | "Breakfast At Sweethearts" | Walker | Breakfast at Sweethearts | 4:10 |
| 13. | "Yakuza Girls" | Walker | The Last Wave of Summer | 2:25 |
| 14. | "Four Walls" | Walker | East | 2:26 |
| 15. | "You Got Nothing I Want" | Barnes | Circus Animals | 3:16 |
| 16. | "My Baby" | Phil Small | East | 3:16 |
| 17. | "Shipping Steel" | Walker | Breakfast at Sweethearts | 3:24 |
| 18. | "Ita" | Walker | East | 3:35 |
| 19. | "Hq454 Monroe" | Troy Cassar-Daley; Walker | The Best of Cold Chisel | 3:11 |
| 20. | "Goodbye (Astrid Goodbye)" | Barnes; Walker | Breakfast at Sweethearts | 2:50 |

Uncovered (limited edition bonus disc)
| No. | Title | Writer(s) | Length |
|---|---|---|---|
| 1. | "Knockin' on Heaven's Door" | Bob Dylan | 5:50 |
| 2. | "Georgia On My Mind" | Hoagy Carmichael; Stuart Gorrell | 4:43 |
| 3. | "Wild Thing" | Chip Taylor | 5:02 |
| 4. | "Long As I Can See the Light" | John Fogerty | 4:46 |
| 5. | "Don't Let Go" | Jesse Stone | 4:13 |
| 6. | "It's Only Make Believe" | Jack Nance; Conway Twitty | 2:52 |
| 7. | "River Deep – Mountain High" | Phil Spector; Jeff Barry; Ellie Greenwich | 3:13 |
| 8. | "Let's Go Get Stoned" | Nickolas Ashford, & Valerie Simpson; Josephine Armstead | 5:12 |
| 9. | "When Something Is Wrong With My Baby" | Isaac Hayes; David Porter | 5:51 |
| 10. | "Big River" | Johnny Cash | 2:51 |
| 11. | "Cry Me a River" | Arthur Hamilton | 3:42 |
| 12. | "Sunshine" | Paul Hewson | 5:59 |

=== 2018 release (2CD set) ===
CD 1
| No. | Title | Writer(s) | Album | Length |
|---|---|---|---|---|
| 1. | "Standing on the Outside" | Don Walker | East | 2:56 |
| 2. | "Khe Sanh" | Walker | Cold Chisel | 4:10 |
| 3. | "When the War Is Over" | Prestwich | Circus Animals | 4:25 |
| 4. | "Bow River" | Ian Moss | Circus Animals | 4:22 |
| 5. | "Rising Sun" | Jimmy Barnes | East | 3:27 |
| 6. | "Lost" | Wes Carr; Walker | The Perfect Crime | 4:05 |
| 7. | "Star Hotel" | Walker | East | 4:07 |
| 8. | "All for You" | Walker | The Best of Cold Chisel: All for You | 4:57 |
| 9. | "Saturday Night" | Walker | Twentieth Century | 4:21 |
| 10. | "No Plans" | Walker | No Plans | 2:37 |
| 11. | "Choirgirl" | Walker | East | 3:25 |
| 12. | "Conversations" | Walker | Breakfast at Sweethearts | 4:33 |
| 13. | "Merry-Go-Round" | Walker | Breakfast at Sweethearts | 4:33 |
| 14. | "Janelle" | Walker | Twentieth Century | 3:38 |
| 15. | "No Sense" | Barnes | Twentieth Century | 2:59 |
| 16. | "Water into Wine" | Prestwich | The Last Wave of Summer | 4:54 |
| 17. | "Letter to Alan" | Walker | Circus Animals | 5:45 |
| 18. | "The Last Wave of Summer" | Walker | The Last Wave of Summer | 5:22 |

CD 2
| No. | Title | Writer(s) | Album | Length |
|---|---|---|---|---|
| 1. | "Cheap Wine" | Walker | East | 3:25 |
| 2. | "Flame Trees" | Steve Prestwich; Walker | Twentieth Century | 4:24 |
| 3. | "Forever Now" | Prestwich | Circus Animals | 4:26 |
| 4. | "Breakfast At Sweethearts" | Walker | Breakfast at Sweethearts | 4:10 |
| 5. | "Yakuza Girls" | Walker | The Last Wave of Summer | 2:25 |
| 6. | "Four Walls" | Walker | East | 2:26 |
| 7. | "Long Dark Road" | Barnes; Ben Rodgers | The Perfect Crime | 4:34 |
| 8. | "Ita" | Walker | East | 3:34 |
| 9. | "The Perfect Crime" | Walker | The Perfect Crime | 2:41 |
| 10. | "You Got Nothing I Want" | Barnes | Circus Animals | 3:16 |
| 11. | "My Baby" | Phil Small | East | 3:16 |
| 12. | "Home and Broken Hearted" | Walker | Cold Chisel | 3:24 |
| 13. | "The Things I Love in You" | Walker | The Last Wave of Summer | 3:20 |
| 14. | "Everybody" | Walker | No Plans | 3:40 |
| 15. | "Shipping Steel" | Walker | Breakfast at Sweethearts | 3:24 |
| 16. | "Hq454 Monroe" | Troy Cassar-Daley; Walker | The Best of Cold Chisel | 3:11 |
| 17. | "One Long Day" | Walker | Cold Chisel | 7:22 |
| 18. | "Goodbye (Astrid Goodbye)" | Barnes; Walker | Breakfast at Sweethearts | 2:50 |
| 19. | "The Party's Over" | | Northbound | 3:03 |

== Charts ==
=== Weekly charts ===
| Chart (2011–2019) | Peak position |
|---|---|
| Australian Albums (ARIA) | 2 |
| New Zealand Albums (RMNZ) | 5 |

=== Year-end charts ===
In 2011, it was the third-highest selling album by an Australian artist after Gotye's Making Mirrors and Reece Mastin's Reece Mastin. It was No. 17 overall.

| Chart (2011) | Position |
|---|---|
| Australian Albums Chart | 17 |
| New Zealand Albums Chart | 35 |

| Chart (2012) | Position |
|---|---|
| Australian Albums Chart | 44 |

| Chart (2015) | Position |
|---|---|
| Australian Albums (ARIA) | 51 |

| Chart (2016) | Position |
|---|---|
| Australian Albums (ARIA) | 79 |

| Chart (2017) | Position |
|---|---|
| Australian Albums (ARIA) | 47 |

| Chart (2018) | Position |
|---|---|
| Australian Albums (ARIA) | 29 |

| Chart (2019) | Position |
|---|---|
| Australian Albums (ARIA) | 37 |

| Chart (2020) | Position |
|---|---|
| Australian Albums (ARIA) | 30 |

| Chart (2021) | Position |
|---|---|
| Australian Albums (ARIA) | 52 |

| Chart (2022) | Position |
|---|---|
| Australian Albums (ARIA) | 53 |

=== Decade-end charts ===
| Chart (2010–2019) | Position |
|---|---|
| Australian Albums (ARIA) | 18 |

== Certifications ==
Certifications for The Best of Cold Chisel
| Region | Certification | Certified units/sales |
|---|---|---|
| Australia (ARIA) | 4× Platinum | 280,000^{‡} |
| New Zealand (RMNZ) | Platinum | 15,000^{‡} |
^{‡} Sales+streaming figures based on certification alone.

== Release history ==
Release history and formats for The Best of Cold Chisel
| Region | Date | Format | Edition(s) | Label | Catalogue |
|---|---|---|---|---|---|
| Australia | 14 October 2011 | CD; digital download; streaming | Standard | Warner Music Australia | 5249889762 |
| Australia | 14 October 2011 | 2×CD; digital download; streaming; 2×LP | Standard + Limited bonus disc | Warner Music Australia | 5249889775 |
| Australia | 28 September 2018 | 2×CD; digital download; streaming; 2×LP | Deluxe | Cold Chisel / Universal Music Australia | CCC003 / CCCLP003 |
