= The Live Tapes Vol. 5 =

Live album by Cold Chisel
- Released: 11 December 2020
- Recorded: 29 February 1980
- Venue: Bondi Lifesaver
- Genre: Pub rock
- Label: Cold Chisel Music

Cold Chisel chronology
Blood Moon (2019)	The Live Tapes Vol. 5 (2020)	50 Years – The Best Of (2024)

The Live Tapes Vol. 5 is a live album by Australian rock band Cold Chisel, released on 11 December 2020. The album was recorded at the Bondi Lifesaver on 29 February 1980. The recording were captured on two multitrack tapes, after 43 shows over 56 days. It was recorded three days before band began recording their landmark album East, and just six months prior to the closure of the club itself.

Barnes recounted the times, saying "In 1980, we were fighting fit and hungry, playing every show like it was our last – and often it almost was. We were still playing pubs, with the audience spilling onto the stage and the band spilling into the audience. I was living just around the corner from the Lifesaver - and probably half the audience ended-up back at mine." The songs on the album have previously never been heard, unless you were at the venue on the night.

The Live Tapes Vol. 5 is the fifth in an ongoing series of special live recordings unearthed from Cold Chisel's own archives.

== Track listing ==
CD 1

1. "Juliet"
2. "Tomorrow"
3. "The Dummy"
4. "Shakin All Over"
5. "Breakfast at Sweethearts"
6. "My Turn to Cry"
7. "Best Kept Lies"
8. "Standing on the Outside"
9. "Knockin' on Heaven's Door"
10. "Star Hotel"
11. "Merry-Go-Round"
12. "Four Walls"
13. "One Long Day"

CD 2

1. "Shipping Steel"
2. "Khe Sanh"
3. "The Door"
4. "Goodbye (Astrid Goodbye)"
5. "Georgia"
6. "Choirgirl"
7. "Ita"
8. "I'm Gonna Roll Ya"
9. "Rosaline"
10. "The Nazz are Blue"
11. "Wild Thing"

== Charts ==
Chart performance for The Live Tapes Vol. 5
Chart (2020)	Peak position
Australian Albums (ARIA)	5

== Release history ==
Release history for The Live Tapes Vol. 5
Region	Date	Format	Label	Catalogue
Australia	11 December 2020	2×CD; 3×vinyl; DD	Cold Chisel Music / Universal Music Australia	CC019 / CC019LP
