= The Last Stand (1984 film) =

Last Stand
- Directed by: Tony Stevens
- Produced by: John McLean
- Starring: Jimmy Barnes; Ian Moss; Don Walker; Phil Small; Steve Prestwich
- Cinematography: John Whitteron
- Edited by: Tony Stevens
- Music by: Cold Chisel
- Distributed by: Warner
- Release date: July 19, 1984
- Country: Australia
- Language: English

Last Stand is a documentary film of the final concert appearances by Australian rock band, Cold Chisel, prior to their first disbandment. It was filmed on 13 and 15 December 1983 at the Sydney Entertainment Centre and released to cinemas in July 1984. It featured the group performing two of the four final concerts of their national Last Stand Tour, from 12 to 15 December 1983. It is interspersed with short interviews from members of the band, their managers, audience members and Midnight Oil front man, Peter Garrett. A DVD version featuring extra footage was issued in October 2005.

== Reception ==
Anna-Maria Delvoso of The Sydney Morning Herald observed, "This is not just another film-of-the-concert-of-the-album rock & roll picture. If this is commercial exploitation, it's worth every cent of it. Last Stand has an intelligent construction. Eschewing self-indulgence, the film displays high production values, excellent sound, camera and editing. There are no cinema verite shots of the band in the back rooms, twanging guitar strings and cracking jokes no-one can hear."

== Soundtrack album ==
The Last Stand

Soundtrack album by Cold Chisel
- Released: October 1992
- Recorded: 13 and 15 December 1983
- Venue: Sydney Entertainment Centre
- Genre: Rock
- Label: East West

Cold Chisel chronology
Chisel (1991)	The Last Stand (1992)	Teenage Love (1994)

In October 1992, The Last Stand's soundtrack album was released by Cold Chisel on compact disc and music cassette via East West Records. It peaked at number 8 on the Australian ARIA Albums Chart.

Adrian Zupp of AllMusic rated the album as four-out-of-five stars, and explained, "The highlights are numerous, but the most memorable moments are the band's timeless signature song 'Khe Sanh', the rock landslide 'Goodbye (Astrid Goodbye)', and the singalong favorite 'Choir Girl'. The recording job is crystal clear, though inevitably can't fully capture the experience of being at the gig amidst the sweat and swagger. But as next best things go, this is the ticket."

The album was remixed and re sequenced with three additional tracks in 1999; some versions included a DVD version of the film with bonus footage. This version was remastered and reissued in 2011. Neither version of the soundtrack has the same tracklist order as the film.

=== 1984 film track listing ===
1. "Standing on the Outside"
2. "Cheap Wine"
3. "Rising Sun"
4. "Janelle"
5. "Khe Sanh"
6. "Twentieth Century"
7. "You Got Nothing I Want"
8. "Tomorrow"
9. "Star Hotel"
10. "Choirgirl"
11. "Bow River"
12. "Flame Trees"
13. "Saturday Night"
14. "Wild Thing"
15. "Goodbye (Astrid Goodbye)"
16. "Don't Let Go"

=== 1992 track listing ===
1. "Standing on the Outside"
2. "Khe Sanh"
3. "Twentieth Century"
4. "Janelle"
5. "Cheap Wine"
6. "Tomorrow"
7. "Rising Sun"
8. "Choirgirl"
9. "You Got Nothing I Want"
10. "Bow River"
11. "Flame Trees"
12. "Saturday Night"
13. "Star Hotel"
14. "Wild Thing"
15. "Goodbye (Astrid Goodbye)"
16. "Don't Let Go"

=== 1999/2005/2011 track listing ===
1. "Standing on the Outside"
2. "Cheap Wine"
3. "Khe Sanh"
4. "Janelle"
5. "Only One"
6. "Twentieth Century"
7. "Tomorrow"
8. "Rising Sun"
9. "Choirgirl"
10. "You Got Nothing I Want"
11. "Bow River"
12. "Flame Trees"
13. "Star Hotel"
14. "Wild Thing"
15. "Saturday Night"
16. "River Deep – Mountain High"
17. "Goodbye (Astrid Goodbye)"
18. "Don't Let Go"
19. "Let's Go Get Stoned"

=== Personnel ===
- Jimmy Barnes – vocals, guitar
- Ian Moss – vocals, guitar
- Steve Prestwich – drums
- Phil Small – bass guitar
- Don Walker – organ, piano

== Charts ==
=== Weekly charts ===
Chart (1992–2011)	Peak position
Australian Albums (ARIA)	8

=== Year-end charts ===
Chart (1992)	Position
Australian Albums Chart	71

== Certifications ==
=== Albums ===
Region	Certification	Certified units/sales
Australia (ARIA)	Gold	35,000^{^}
^{^} Shipments figures based on certification alone.

=== Video ===
Region	Certification	Certified units/sales
Australia (ARIA)	2× Platinum	30,000^{^}
^{^} Shipments figures based on certification alone.
