= The Live Tapes Vol. 1 =

Live album by Cold Chisel
- Released: 22 November 2013
- Recorded: Hordern Pavilion.18 April 2012
- Genre: Pub rock
- Label: Universal Music Australia

Cold Chisel chronology
No Plans (2012)	The Live Tapes Vol. 1 (2013)	The Live Tapes Vol. 2 (2014)

"The Live Tapes Vol. 1" is a 2 disc live album by Australian rock band Cold Chisel. A deluxe edition also came with a bonus DVD. The album was recorded in Sydney’s Hordern Pavilion on 18 April 2012 and released on 22 November 2013. The album was the first new live Cold Chisel release in over 10 years. The album peaked at number 27 in Australia.

This particular show will be long remembered by those who endured the monsoonal thunderstorm that lit up Sydney that evening. The band’s lead singer reflected saying, "We were really road hardened by the time of that Hordern gig because we'd just finished that big tour a few months prior. Adding a few new songs in the set for those launch gigs kept things fresh for us. Listening and watching it back, it's raw and primal, warts and all - like the best rock & roll should be."

== Reviews ==
Chris Familton of The Music gave the album 4 out of 5 saying; "This is a great (and great sounding) addition to their catalogue that serves a number of purposes – a hits package, a sign that they are still alive and kicking as a band and a reminder of what a dynamic and visceral live act they remain."

== Track listing ==
CD 1

1. "Standing On The Outside"
2. "Cheap Wine"
3. "No Plans"
4. "HQ454 Monroe"
5. "Saturday Night"
6. "Everybody"
7. "Yakuza Girls"
8. "My Baby"
9. "Rising Sun"
10. "Summer Moon"
11. "Choirgirl"

CD 2

1. "All For You"
2. "You Got Nothing I Want"
3. "Merry-Go-Round"
4. "Flame Trees"
5. "Khe Sanh"
6. "Bow River"
7. "When the War Is Over"
8. "Dead and Laid to Rest"
9. "Four Walls"
10. "Goodbye (Astrid Goodbye)"

DVD

1. "Standing On The Outside"
2. "Cheap Wine"
3. "No Plans"
4. "HQ454 Monroe"
5. "Saturday Night"
6. "Everybody"
7. "Yakuza Girls"
8. "My Baby"
9. "Rising Sun"
10. "Summer Moon"
11. "Choir Girl"
12. "All For You"
13. "You Got Nothing I Want"
14. "Merry-Go-Round"
15. "Flame Trees"
16. "Khe Sanh"
17. "Bow River"
18. "When The War Is Over"
19. "Dead and Laid to Rest"
20. "Four Walls"
21. "Goodbye (Astrid, Goodbye)"
22. In The Studio With Cold Chisel - "Everybody"
23. In The Studio With Cold Chisel - "No Plans"
24. In The Studio With Cold Chisel - "Dead and Laid to Rest"
25. In The Studio With Cold Chisel - "All For You"
26. In The Studio With Cold Chisel - "Get Back On The Road"

== Charts ==
=== Weekly charts ===
Chart (2013)	Peak position
Australian Albums (ARIA)	27

=== Year-end charts ===
Chart (2013)	Position
Australian Artist Albums Chart	34

== Certification ==
Region	Certification	Certified units/sales
Australia (ARIA)	Platinum	15,000^{^}
^{^} Shipments figures based on certification alone.

== Release history ==
Region	Date	Format	Edition(s)	Label	Catalogue
Australia	22 November 2013	CD; digital download	Standard / Deluxe	Universal Music Australia	CC013
Australia	November 2014	DVD	Standard	Universal Music Australia	CCDVD005
