= Hands Out of My Pocket =

Single by Cold Chisel

from the album Teenage Love
- A-side: "Hands Out of My Pocket"
- Released: 29 August 1994
- Recorded: 1980
- Genre: Rock
- Label: WEA
- Songwriter: Jimmy Barnes
- Producer: Mark Opitz

Cold Chisel singles chronology
"Misfits" (1991)	"Hands Out of My Pocket" (1994)	"Nothing But You" (1994)

"Hands Out of My Pocket" was a 1994 single from Australian rock band Cold Chisel, the first from the album Teenage Love. It reached number 9 in the Australian charts.

== Details ==
Teenage Love was a compilation album that collected studio recordings, many just demos, that the band had previously not released. "Hands Out of My Pocket" was originally demoed for the album East and was included in some later reissues of the album as a bonus track. Don Walker later said the song was really only played once and author Jimmy Barnes can be heard yelling out chord changes on the recording.

Glenn A. Baker said the song was inspired by, "a bizarre incident on Christmas Day where a Hare Krishna cousin of Jimmy's conducted a self-immolation rite in a bathtub."

== Charts ==
=== Weekly charts ===
Chart (1994)	Peak position
Australia (ARIA)	9

=== Year-end charts ===
Chart (1994)	Position
Australia (ARIA)	99

== Recording credits ==
- Jimmy Barnes - vocals
- Ian Moss - guitar
- Don Walker - piano
- Steve Prestwich - drums
- Phil Small - bass
