= Khe Sanh (disambiguation) =

Khe Sanh is the commune of Quảng Trị Province, Vietnam.

Khe Sanh may also refer to:

== Places ==
- Khe Sanh Combat Base, was a United States Marine Corps outpost south of the Vietnamese Demilitarized Zone (DMZ) used during the Vietnam War

== Other uses ==
- Khe Sanh (song), a song by Cold Chisel
- Battle of Khe Sanh, a 1968 battle during the Vietnam War

== See also ==
- Kaesong, a city in North Korea
- Kajang, a city in Malaysia
- Que Son Valley, a valley in Quảng Nam Province
