= No Plans =

Studio album by Cold Chisel
- Released: 6 April 2012
- Recorded: Studios 301, Sydney
- Genre: Rock
- Length: 51:51
- Label: Warner
- Producer: Kevin Shirley

Cold Chisel chronology
The Best of Cold Chisel (2011)	No Plans (2012)	The Live Tapes Vol. 1 (2013)

Professional ratings
Review scores
Source	Rating
The Australian	4/5 stars
Sunday Herald Sun	4/5 stars
Sun Herald	7/10 stars
Herald Sun	3.5/5 stars
theMusic.com.au	positive

No Plans is the seventh studio album by Australian rock band Cold Chisel. It was released on 6 April 2012 and was the band's first studio album in 14 years. It features the final recorded performances by drummer Steve Prestwich, who died of a brain tumour in January 2011. The album peaked at number 2 on the Australian charts.

== Album details ==
Work on the album began after the band reunited for a one-off gig in front of 50,000 people at a V8 Supercars event in Sydney in 2009. Singer Jimmy Barnes explained: "Even before the show, in the rehearsal period we all had a really great time and we thought maybe we should carry it on a bit. So we went into my studio at my house and did some writing and recording, without having any plans of doing anything with it."

With the death of Prestwich in January 2011, Charley Drayton became Cold Chisel's new drummer, with the band saying they wanted to continue with the plans they had made with Prestwich.

The album's closing song, "I Got Things To Do", was written by Prestwich and presented to the band in the early sessions for Barnes to sing. Barnes said: "I think somewhere in the demo process Steve put down his own version for his own benefit or archives, or it was to show me the melodies or something like that and we didn't think about it." The masters of the recordings were given to producer Kevin Shirley to mix in the United States and he produced a version with Prestwich performing lead vocals. "Don (Walker)'s listening to this mix and it sounded really good and he thought, 'Oh yeah, Jimmy will start singing in a second', and the sound of Steve's voice came out and it was one of those hair-on-the-back-of-the-neck standing up moments and we all got very emotional," Barnes said. "We thought, 'Well, that's the version we should put out'."

The album's cover art, by Sydney photographer Steve Baccon, is a homage to expatriate Australian landscape artist Jeffrey Smart, being similar to his Cahill Expressway.

== Critical reception ==
Reviewed at the time of release, TheMusic said, "the opener shows they are still a vital rock'n'roll band, while first single "Everybody" follows with a far more laidback gait, but is powerful in its own way; Barnes' vocal tackling Don Walker's biting lyrics with the right amount of venom. Of course it can't be long before a classy Chisel love song and "All For You" is no slouch in that department."

The Australian claimed, "the album's first notes consist of a Barnes vocal intro of such serrated intensity that the listener is left in no doubt, as Walker drily observed, that it's a new record by that band." Walker's song-writing that, "evokes so much with such apparent economy," was particularly praised.

The Sydney Morning Herald also noted the opening, "with Barnes screaming about smoking cigarettes and being a primate," but said, "However, it is musically that No Plans really excels. Cold Chisel plays direct, hard blues with a surprising amount of groove."

== Track listing ==
All songs written by Don Walker, except as noted.

1. "No Plans" – 2:36
2. "Everybody" – 3:40
3. "All For You" – 4:56
4. "HQ454 Monroe" (Walker, Troy Cassar-Daley) – 3:10
5. "Dead and Laid to Rest" (Jimmy Barnes, Guy Davies) – 4:30
6. "Missing a Girl" – 3:25
7. "Too Late" (Ian Moss) – 4:30
8. "I Gotta Get Back on the Road" – 5:51
9. "Our Old Flame" – 3:43
10. "This Day" – 3:13
11. "Summer Moon" – 4:30
12. "The Horizon" – 4:37
13. "I Got Things to Do" (Steve Prestwich) – 3:10

== Personnel ==
- Jimmy Barnes – lead vocals, backing vocals
- Ian Moss – guitars, backing vocals, lead vocals ("Too Late", "Summer Moon")
- Steve Prestwich – drums ("All For You", "HQ 454 Monroe", "Missing a Girl", "I Got Things To Do"), backing vocals, lead vocals ("I Got Things To Do")
- Phil Small – bass, backing vocals
- Don Walker – keyboards, piano, backing vocals
- Charley Drayton – drums, backing vocals

== Chart positions ==
=== Weekly charts ===
Chart (2012)	Peak position
Australian Albums (ARIA)	2
New Zealand Albums (RMNZ)	14

=== Year-end charts ===
Chart (2012)	Position
Australian Albums Chart	76

== Certifications ==
Region	Certification	Certified units/sales
Australia (ARIA)	Gold	35,000^{^}
^{^} Shipments figures based on certification alone.
