= Circus Animals =

Studio album by Cold Chisel
- Released: 8 March 1982
- Recorded: September–December 1981
- Studio: Paradise (Sydney), Studios 301 (Sydney)
- Genre: Pub rock
- Length: 44:20
- Label: WEA
- Producer: Mark Opitz, Cold Chisel

Cold Chisel chronology
Swingshift (1981)	Circus Animals (1982)	Northbound (1983)

Singles from Circus Animals
- 1. "You Got Nothing I Want" Released: November 1981; 2. "Forever Now" Released: March 1982; 3. "When the War Is Over" Released: July 1982

Circus Animals is the fourth studio album by Australian band Cold Chisel, released on 8 March 1982. It was recorded and mixed at Paradise Studios and EMI Studios 301, Sydney, between September and December 1981. It reached number one on the Australian charts, remaining in the charts for 40 weeks, and also topped the New Zealand charts. The working title for the album was "Tunnel Cunts".

At the 1982 Countdown Music Awards, the album was nominated for Best Australian Album.

== Album details ==
Many of the album's songs were written as a direct reaction to the pop success of the band's previous LP East and feature unusual, experimental arrangements. Singer Barnes said, "the whole band, particularly Don, decided to revolt against the pop formula when we made Circus Animals." Walker said, "There was no way of improving what we'd done on East, so we had to think of new things to try." Elsewhere, he added, "If we’d taken those same set of lessons and applied them to the same sort of record it would’ve got more slick and lost the spontaneity. The only way to remain fresh is to smash all those rules, go back and start something else. Maybe bring that to fruition or maybe you’ll fail." Barnes noted, "It's not way out, not ridiculously experimental. It's all been done before, just not by us."

The "new sound" was described as, "made up of greater rhythmic diversity, looser song structures, that [were] less constricting for live performances" Critics noticed that the, "intricate drum patterns imposed a heavy bottom-end groove." Walker said, "Steve and I were doing a lot of experimenting in the studio with rhythms based on toms- just big tom sounds repeated over and over again. So that turned up on "Taipan", "Numbers Fall" and "Wild Colonial Boy"." In the lead up to the recording, the band was playing concerts in pubs and clubs in regional centres such as Wollongong and Newcastle. Band members were encouraged to improvise and change song structures. Barnes said, "It was a really loose free-form thing. We were developing and changing the songs every night to suit the atmosphere we were in." Walker noted, "A song like "Taipan" you can do just about anything you like and it won't fall apart."

Producer Opitz said of the band's reaction to East, "Don came to me six months later and said, “I never want to have another commercial album again.” Which I thought was really funny, because what the fuck? Don said he didn’t want to do another commercial album, but thank God for Steve Prestwich." Walker said, "With Steve demoing such melodic songs - it didn't matter what we did to them, they were going to be extremely melodic, accessible songs - I felt no pressure to write commercial. I didn't try to write singles, tight arrangements or anything. I had a bit of an indulge." Barnes added, "Immediately we had success, Don went dark."

Lyrically, Walker said, "In the space of 18 months with bits of pieces of tape and stray lines there were maybe three or four things I was writing about. Obviously there's something which has been obsessing me about taking chances or not, although I didn't realise it at the time it was worrying me."

The first single "You Got Nothing I Want" was written by singer Jimmy Barnes about the lack of interest shown in them by their American label rep during the band's 1981 US tour. "Bow River" was a song by guitarist Ian Moss, written about a sheep station in Western Australia where his brother Peter had once worked. The song was included as the B-side to the Australian version of the single for Forever Now but proved so popular that it was often played on radio in its own right. "When the War Is Over" was written by drummer Steve Prestwich and has been covered numerous times by Little River Band, John Farnham, Uriah Heep, Cosima De Vito and Something for Kate. "Letter to Alan" was dedicated to a former member of the band's road crew, Alan Dallow, who died in a truck accident.

Mark Opitz later said, "We were doing a mountain of coke during the Circus Animals sessions. We would do monster lines of coke and then the band members would go in to do their parts. I remember one time my head turned into a helicopter and I was about to lift off and go through the control room roof."

The album cover was shot by Peter Levy. Barnes said, "This caravan we towed out to Lake Eyre for the photo shoot and when we finished, we left it there. It was about 40 degrees, it was brutal." Don Walker said of the location, "I wanted something that was Australian and couldn't be mistaken for anywhere else. A wide flat space with a caravan on it."

Five of the album's ten songs were later covered for the 2007 tribute album Standing on the Outside: "You Got Nothing I Want" (Alex Lloyd), "Bow River" (Troy Cassar-Daley), "Forever Now" (Pete Murray), "Houndog" (You Am I) and "When the War is Over" (Something for Kate).

On Friday 22 July 2011, all of Cold Chisel's albums were re-released as remastered 'Collector's Editions'. They became available for iTunes download for the very first time. The album re-entered the Australian charts for one week, at number 46.

== Reception ==
Professional ratings
Review scores
Source	Rating
Allmusic	4.5/5 stars

Circus Animals was listed at No. 4 in the book, 100 Best Australian Albums, in October 2010. In 2011, it was voted the 75th greatest Australian album by industry pundits at Triple J. Juice magazine rated it the 17th greatest album of all time.

Adrian Zupp gave the album a rating of four and a half out of five at allmusic. He described it as, "A ten-song stew of the band's signature guitar-and-piano-driven ballads and rockers [that] further confirmed Chisel's depth and breadth as a creative unit." He went on to describe the highlights as, ""Houndog", a gripping, grueling riff-fest road song; the strip-club, tom-tom beat of the slinky "Numbers Fall"; the bent-halo ballad "When the War Is Over"; and the coup de grâce, the coke-frenzy-rock of the mini-epic "Letter To Alan"."

Critic Toby Creswell described Circus Animals as, "a really extraordinary piece of work, as though John Steinbeck, Henry Lawson, Manning Clarke and Jerry Lee Lewis formed a band." He went on to single out "Wild Colonial Boy", "because it so brilliantly encapsulated the Australian experience," and "Houndog", "because it has a completely mad structure but it too goes to the heart of the Australian wanderlust." Roadrunner claimed the band, "revel in their Australianness, and seem to capture a lot of the hard edge of this country."

The Age also gave a positive review, saying, "I regarded Cold Chisel as over-rated when they first hit the scene with a splash, but they have established themselves as a consistent, powerful outfit, with strong instrumentals, vocals and writing. All these qualities have come together on Circus Animals, for the first time."

Given an "A" rating in Canada's Windsor Star, the reviewer noted, "This is heavy metal at its painful best. Jim Barnes screams like other hard rockers, but never for shallow effect, he has real emotive strength. Guitarist Ian Moss shifts into overdrive with the grace of an Indy professional and Walker's insightful lyrics give the music weight." New Zealand magazine Rip It Up said, "Barnes has no peers in the shouting stakes, yet tempers this with delicacy when required. On any assessment, Circus Animals is a triumph."

Reviewed in Rolling Stone Australia at the time of its release, Circus Animals was described as, "a deeply flawed masterpiece, brilliant not so much in spite of the flaws but because of them." The reviewer went on to say, "from the hot, barren coastal highway to the sloping indifference of Kings Cross, these are Australian blues." Particular mention was made of the song "Wild Colonial Boy", which is said to be, "the most overtly political statement from an Australian rock artist in years."

== Track listing ==
All songs written by Don Walker, except as noted.

Side one

1. "You Got Nothing I Want" (Jimmy Barnes) – 3:16
2. "Bow River" (Ian Moss) – 4:23
3. "Forever Now" (Steve Prestwich) – 4:26
4. "Taipan" – 3:55
5. "Houndog" – 5:04

Side two

1. "Wild Colonial Boy" – 4:52
2. "No Good for You" (Moss) – 3:16
3. "Numbers Fall" – 4:46
4. "When the War Is Over" (Prestwich) – 4:25
5. "Letter to Alan" – 5:57

== Charts ==
=== Weekly charts ===
Chart (1982)	Peak position
Australian Albums (Kent Music Report)	1
New Zealand Albums (RMNZ)	1
Chart (2011)	Peak position
Australian Albums (ARIA)	46

=== Year-end charts ===
Chart (1982)	Position
Australian Albums (Kent Music Report)	6
New Zealand Albums (RMNZ)	15

== Certifications ==
Region	Certification	Certified units/sales
Australia (ARIA)	3× Platinum	210,000^{^}
New Zealand (RMNZ)	Platinum	15,000^{^}
^{^} Shipments figures based on certification alone.

== See also ==
- List of number-one albums in Australia during the 1980s#1982
- List of number-one albums from the 1980s (New Zealand)
- List of Top 25 albums for 1982 in Australia

== Personnel ==
- Jim Barnes - lead vocals, backing vocals
- Ian Moss - guitar, backing vocals, lead vocals (tracks 2, 5 and 9)
- Don Walker - organ, piano, synthesizer, backing vocals
- Steve Prestwich - drums, backing vocals
- Phil Small - bass, backing vocals
