= Teenage Love (album) =

Compilation album by Cold Chisel
- Released: 31 October 1994
- Recorded: June 1976–January 1983
- Studio: Paradise; Rhinoceros; Trafalgar; Peppers
- Length: 62:15
- Label: EastWest
- Producer: Mark Opitz; Peter Walker; Cold Chisel

Cold Chisel chronology
The Last Stand (1992)	Teenage Love (1994)	The Last Wave of Summer (1998)

Singles from Teenage Love
- 1. "Hands Out of My Pocket" Released: 29 August 1994; 2. "Nothing but You" Released: October 1994; 3. "Yesterdays" Released: 3 March 1995

Teenage Love is a compilation album by Australian pub rock band Cold Chisel, released in 1994. The album collected studio recordings, many just demos, that were not used on previous albums. Phil Small said, "There was always a surplus of 3 to 4 tracks with each album." The tracks were recorded between 1976 and 1983. "Hands Out of My Pocket", "Nothing but You" and "Yesterdays" were issued as singles.

== Album details ==
Don Walker said of the album, "Most of the time they were recorded as demos, so it's just the band in the studio slamming down a new song. For a certain number of them, it's the only time we ever played the song." Walker insisted that the tracks be released without any overdubs." "The Party's Over" was a live staple for the band but not included on earlier studio albums. Teenage Love's studio version originally appeared (with a different mix) as the B-side of "Knocking On Heaven's Door", the bonus single that, in 1980, accompanied the first 10,000 Australian pressings of the East album.

"A Little Bit of Daylight" is an early version of the song recorded by Jimmy Barnes as "Daylight" on his solo album Bodyswerve. "Monica", a song written by Prestwich, is the only Cold Chisel song that Don Walker doesn't play on, as he claims he couldn't play with a "latin feel."

The impetus for the album was manager Rod Willis finding some tapes with song titles he didn't recognise, sending the details to Walker. Walker said, "I went to a tape drawer I hadn't opened since 1984 and found some of the songs on Rod's list plus one or two others. The quality of the playing was just astonishing."

Walker later said, ""Despite all our best efforts, Teenage Love was viewed as scraping the bottom of the barrel for old material. But it was a labour of love and what people didn't realise is that everyone involved with the band privately think Teenage Love is the greatest Cold Chisel album ever. They'll all tell you that, myself included." Elsewhere, he added, "Anybody who was around at the time knows fundamentally we were a pretty feral rock band. It’s been a long time since we were out there playing live and all people hear about Cold Chisel is the big, sleepy hits on radio. There are probably a few generations who’ve come along thinking that’s what the band was like but really that’s just a reflection of the fairly small commercial end of things."

The album was reissued with larger font. Walker said, "The logic was that we were a little bit too arty farty with the original cover design. Although Pierre Baroni had down a fantastically striking album cover for Teenage Love, if you stood any more than 10 centimetres away, you wouldn't know it was a Cold Chisel CD. We've now rectified that."

== Reception ==
Allmusic describes "Teenage Love" as, "the weakest studio album in Cold Chisel's catalog." However, it continues, "Yes, it's Chisel's "B" material [...] But then, most bands would kill to have this kind of stuff as their "A" material." Ian McFarlane said, "Teenage Love proved to be a remarkable collection of songs that were brimming with loose ends and vibrant spontaneity. Outstanding tracks like "Metho Blues", "Nothing but You", "Teenage Love Affair" and the boogie "Drinkin' in Port Lincoln" possessed more grit and fire than most of the debut album or Twentieth Century.

The album reached the number 6 in the Australian charts.

== Track listing ==
Recording details are sourced from the album booklet.

1. "Hands Out of My Pocket" (recorded in March 1980 at Paradise)
2. "Nothing but You" (recorded in October 1982 at Paradise)
3. "When the Sun Goes Down" (recorded in January 1983 at Rhinoceros)
4. "Suicide Sal" (recorded in September 1981 at Trafalgar)
5. "It Ain't Wrong" (recorded in September 1977 at Trafalgar)
6. "Teenage Love Affair" (recorded in September 1977 at Trafalgar)
7. "Monica" (recorded in October 1982 at Trafalgar)
8. "Mona and the Preacher" (recorded in September 1977 at Trafalgar)
9. "Drinkin' in Port Lincoln" (recorded in June 1976 at Peppers)
10. "Payday in a Pub" (recorded in March 1980 at Paradise)
11. "Metho Blues" (recorded in September 1977 at Trafalgar)
12. "Yesterdays" (recorded in October 1982 at Paradise)
13. "Notion for You" (recorded in October 1981 at Paradise)
14. "F-111" (recorded in September 1981 at Paradise)
15. "A Little Bit of Daylight" (recorded in October 1981 at Paradise)
16. "The Party's Over" (recorded in March 1980 at Paradise)

== Charts ==
=== Weekly charts ===
Chart (1994)	Peak position
Australian Albums (ARIA)	6

=== Year-end charts ===
Chart (1994)	Position
Australian Albums Chart	71

== Certifications ==
Region	Certification	Certified units/sales
Australia (ARIA)	Gold	35,000^{^}
^{^} Shipments figures based on certification alone.
