= The Last Wave of Summer =

Studio album by Cold Chisel
- Released: 9 October 1998
- Recorded: October 1997 − June 1998
- Genre: Rock
- Length: 55:24
- Label: Mushroom

Cold Chisel chronology
Teenage Love (1994)	The Last Wave of Summer (1998)	The Studio Sessions 1978-1984 (1999)

The Last Wave of Summer is the sixth studio album by Australian pub rock band, Cold Chisel. It was released in October 1998 and reached number-one on The Australian ARIA Charts. It was the band's first studio album in 14 years.

At the ARIA Music Awards of 1999, the album was nominated for Best Rock Album.

== Album details ==
Released 14 years after Cold Chisel had released their last studio album (Twentieth Century), there was a considerable amount of speculation in the press before the release of The Last Wave of Summer. Walker stated that after so long apart, the band was curious and intrigued by the possibility of recording together, and felt everyone had improved as songwriters. He also said it was very inspiring swapping songs with other members of the band, especially considering their history.

The band was not intending to progress to studio recording unless they deemed the songs were of sufficient quality. When Don Walker was asked how the band decided which songs to work on next, he replied, "Psychological manipulation, sullen looks, petulance, tantrums, insane rages both faked and real, sexual coquettishness and pathological violence. Sometimes the last two together."

Some early sessions were done with Paul McKercher and another with Rick Will, neither of which the band found satisfactory. Over a hundred songs were considered for the album over a 3-month rehearsal period, all recorded as demos at the Sydney Opera House. Barnes and Prestwich had both stockpiled songs. Walker, who had recently used songs for Moss's Petrolhead, Tex, Don and Charlie's Sad but True, and his own solo debut, felt he had little to offer. "I didn't have much around. So a lot of that is written from a standing start. I assumed the reunion album was going to be largely written by the other guys and I was quite relaxed about that."

The band had signed an unusual contract with Mushroom Records, a partnership whereby the band would split all expenses and profits with the label. The contract also stipulated that the label would have no creative input whatsoever.

Barnes described the recording process as, "very unorthodox. Normally when you record, everyone wears headphones and everything is isolated, so if someone makes a mistake you can cut it out. We had a PA in the studio - everything bled through everything else. What it meant was we had to record virtually live. So it's an album that's got lots of warts on it, little things that are technically wrong, but at the same time it has an immense amount of feel." Elsewhere he said, "You can almost hear the guitars going slightly out of tune as the song progresses because Mossy's hammering away."

Walker later said, "Last Wave of Summer was a production nightmare. There hadn't been much growing up done in the previous 15 years, or all the growing had been in the wrong direction."

The album covers topics ranging from the serious, including the Australian Aboriginal stolen generation in the Ian Moss penned "Red Sand" and judicial inequity in Don Walker's "Mr. Crown Prosecutor", to the flippant, such as the pub adventure "Yakuza Girls".

The cover photo, by Adrienne Overall, of the band seated at a service station in Wyong, New South Wales, references Edward Hopper's Nighthawks.

A rockabilly version of "Yakuza Girls" appeared on Don Walker's 2006 solo album Cutting Back.

== Reception ==
Allmusic described the album as a, "less visceral; more cerebral," album by, "an older, more mature Chisel -- accomplished songsmiths and musicians with nothing left to prove." It's noted that, "there's a shade less catchiness to this album than, say, Breakfast at Sweethearts or East." Barnes' vocals have, "never sounded better or bitten harder."

Michael Smith from Drum Media said the album opened and closed, "with a couple of swamp rockers that remind you that the Cruel Sea and Beasts of Bourbon didn't write the book," and closed by saying the album was, "a damned fine addition to the catalogue of one of the real musical treasures of this country."

The Age wrote, "Barnesy's voice is its best in years, and Don Walker lyrics are, as ever, thoughtful. Because of its bluesy feel, the album will be as welcome at a yuppie dinner party as at a Chisel fan's piss-up."

== Track listing ==
All tracks written by Don Walker, except as noted.

1. "Mr. Crown Prosecutor" – 3:19
2. "The Things I Love in You" – 3:18
3. "Baby's On Fire" – 3:03
4. "Way Down" (Steve Prestwich) – 3:56
5. "Bal-A-Versailles" – 4:59
6. "Yakuza Girls" – 2:29
7. "He Can't Believe It's Over with You" – 3:53
8. "Angel In My Room" (Jimmy Barnes) – 3:40
9. "Never Stop Loving You" (Barnes) – 3:59
10. "Red Sand" (Ian Moss, Peter Moss, Cal Curtis) – 4:53
11. "Pretty Little Thing" – 3:12
12. "So Hard" – 3:48
13. "Water into Wine" (Prestwich) – 4:54
14. "The Last Wave of Summer" – 6:01

In addition to these, the album has a hidden track written by Phil Small & Jimmy Barnes entitled:

- "Once around the Sun"

Subsequent re-issues expanded the album to twenty tracks, including the following in addition to the original 14 tracks, and re-ordered the original track listing. Further B-sides from the album's singles were included on the 2011 compilation album, Besides.

- "This Time Round"
- "Once Around the Sun" (Phil Small, Barnes)
- "By My Side" (Prestwich)
- "Somewhere in the Silence" (Prestwich)
- "Someone Caught My Eye" (Prestwich)
- "This Big Old Car"

== Personnel ==
- Jimmy Barnes – vocals
- Ian Moss – guitar, vocals (lead on "Way Down" and "Red Sand")
- Don Walker – keyboards
- Steve Prestwich – drums
- Phil Small – bass

== Charts ==
=== Weekly charts ===
Chart (1998/99)	Peak position
Australian Albums (ARIA)	1
New Zealand Albums (RMNZ)	13

=== Year-end charts ===
Chart (1998)	Position
Australian Albums Chart	21

== Certifications ==
Region	Certification	Certified units/sales
Australia (ARIA)	2× Platinum	140,000^{^}
^{^} Shipments figures based on certification alone.

== See also ==
- List of number-one albums in Australia during the 1990s#1998
- List of Top 25 albums for 1998 in Australia
