= Standing on the Outside =

Standing on the Outside: The Songs of Cold Chisel

Compilation album by various / Cold Chisel
- Released: 2007
- Genre: Rock
- Label: Rhino Records

Cold Chisel albums chronology
Ringside (2003)	Standing on the Outside: The Songs of Cold Chisel (2007)	Never Before (2011)

Standing on the Outside: The Songs of Cold Chisel is a tribute album dedicated to the songs of Australian band Cold Chisel. The album features 18 songs recorded by Australian and New Zealand artists The Living End, Dallas Crane, Pete Murray, Ben Lee, Thirsty Merc, Evermore, Paul Kelly, Troy Cassar-Daley, Grinspoon, You Am I, Katie Noonan, Something for Kate, Alex Lloyd, Shane Nicholson, The Waifs, Sarah Blasko, Augie March and The Flairz.

Standing on the Outside was conceived by Ed St John of Warner Australia as a tribute to the label's best-selling Australian act. The album featured liner notes by Glenn A. Baker. A special edition featured a second CD containing the original 18 Cold Chisel songs. The album peaked at number 2 on the ARIA Charts and was certified platinum.

== Track listing ==
No.	Title	Writer(s)	Length
1.	"Rising Sun" (The Living End)	Barnes	3:20
2.	"Standing on the Outside" (Dallas Crane)	Walker	2:58
3.	"Forever Now" (Pete Murray)	Prestwich	4:49
4.	"No Sense" (Ben Lee)	Barnes	2:58
5.	"My Baby" (Thirsty Merc)	Small	3:55
6.	"Water into Wine" (Evermore)	Prestwich	4:09
7.	"Khe Sanh" (Paul Kelly)	Walker	4:17
8.	"Bow River" (Troy Cassar-Daley)	Moss	4:37
9.	"Saturday Night" (Grinspoon)	Walker	2:57
10.	"Houndog" (You Am I)	Walker	4:33
11.	"Choirgirl" (Katie Noonan)	Walker	3:22
12.	"When the War Is Over" (Something for Kate)	Prestwich	5:19
13.	"You Got Nothing I Want" (Alex Lloyd)	Barnes	2:35
14.	"Cheap Wine" (Shane Nicholson)	Walker	3:42
15.	"Four Walls" (The Waifs)	Walker	3:33
16.	"Flame Trees" (Sarah Blasko)	Walker, Prestwich	5:21
17.	"Janelle" (Augie March)	Walker	4:27
18.	"Shipping Steel" (The Flairz featuring Dave Larkin)	Walker	2:53

Bonus CD
No.	Title	Writer(s)	Length
1.	"Rising Sun"	Barnes	3:27
2.	"Standing on the Outside"	Walker	2:54
3.	"Forever Now"	Prestwich	4:26
4.	"No Sense"	Barnes	3:00
5.	"My Baby"	Small	4:03
6.	"Water into Wine"	Prestwich	4:49
7.	"Khe Sanh"	Walker	4:10
8.	"Bow River"	Moss	4:22
9.	"Saturday Night"	Walker	4:21
10.	"Houndog"	Walker	5:02
11.	"Choirgirl"	Walker	3:15
12.	"When the War Is Over"	Prestwich	4:24
13.	"You Got Nothing I Want"	Barnes	3:16
14.	"Cheap Wine"	Walker	3:25
15.	"Four Walls"	Walker	2:24
16.	"Flame Trees"	Walker, Prestwich	4:25
17.	"Janelle"	Walker	3:38
18.	"Shipping Steel"	Walker	3:26

== Charts ==
=== Weekly charts ===
Chart (2007)	Peak position
Australian Albums (ARIA)	2

=== Year-end charts ===
Chart (2007)	Position
Australian Albums Chart	42

== Certifications ==
Region	Certification	Certified units/sales
Australia (ARIA)	Platinum	70,000^{^}
^{^} Shipments figures based on certification alone.
