= Megan Williams (actress) =

Australian actress and singer (1956–2000)

- Born: Megan Mingyu Williams; 11 September 1956; London, England
- Died: 17 April 2000 (aged 43); Sydney, New South Wales, Australia
- Occupations: Actress; singer
- Partner: Ian Moss

Megan Mingyu Williams (11 September 1956 – 17 April 2000) was an Australian actress and singer, who played a continuing role as Alice Sullivan in the television drama The Sullivans, and won a Logie Award for her work in Anzacs (1985).

== Early years ==
Williams was born in London, England, to David and Chin Yu Williams who appeared in a West End production of South Pacific. Her mother was described as "half-Chinese". At six months old, Williams had a minor TV role as an abandoned baby on The Adventures of Robin Hood. Williams' family moved to Sydney, Australia, where she pursued an acting career.

== Career ==
=== Actor ===
Williams' first major role was as an ongoing lead, Ann Watson, in the daily soap opera Class of '74 (1974). The long running role of Alice Watkins Sullivan in The Sullivans (1978-1982) followed. A guest role as Carol Canning in The Outsiders (1976) episode 10 "Charlie Cole Esq." (broadcast 1977) had her appearing in a bikini. After The Sullivans ended she continued to act on Australian television, with a guest role in ABC drama-musical series Sweet and Sour (1984), a Logie Award winning role as Kate Baker in the miniseries Anzacs (1985), and an ongoing role of Cassie Jones in Return to Eden (1986). In the late 1980s she worked in the UK, appearing in one episode of British soap opera EastEnders (1989). Williams had a minor role in the movie Nightmare Man (1999). Williams appeared in an Australian production of Cats as Grizzabella. She appeared in the Australian comedy series All Together Now, which starred Jon English, as an electrician called Julie in the episode titled "I've Got to Be Me" (Season 3 - Episode 3).

FILM

Year	Program	Character	Type
1995	Dido & Aeneas	unknown role	TV Opera CANADA
1999	Nightmare Man	Carolyn Worden	Feature film CANADA/NZ/AUSTRALIA

TELEVISION

Year	Program	Character	Type
1957	The Adventures of Robin Hood (TV series)	Molly	TV series UK
1974-1975	Class of '74	Ann Watson	TV series, Regular role
1975	Class of '75	Ann Watson	TV series, Regular role
1975	Division 4	Barbie Carson	TV series, 1 episode
1976	The Outsiders	Carol Canning	ABC TV series, 1 episode
1977	Graham Kennedy's Blankety Blanks	Herself	TV series, 2 episodes
1977	All At Sea	Maryanne Hand	TV movie
1978-1983	The Sullivans	Alice Watkins Sullivan / Alice Morgan	TV series, 729 episodes
1981	The Mike Walsh Show	Guest - Herself with Paul Cronin & Andy Anderson	TV series, 1 episode
1981	The Don Lane Show	Herself sings "We'll Meet Again" at Victory Ball	TV series, 1 episode
1982	The Daryl Somers Show	Herself	TV series, 1 episode
1984	Super Sleuth	Roberta Collins	TV movie
1984	Sweet and Sour	Charlie	ABC TV series, 4 episodes
1985	The Midday Show	Grizabella ('Cats')	TV series, 2 episodes
1985	Anzacs	Sister Kate Baker	TV miniseries, 5 episodes
1985	Making Of 'Anzacs'	Herself / Sister Kate Baker	TV special
1986	Return To Eden	Cassie Jones	TV series, 22 episodes
1989	EastEnders	Nancy	TV series UK, 1 episode
1990	Hey Hey It's Saturday	Herself (Red Faces)	TV series, 1 episode
1990	In Melbourne Today	Guest - Herself	TV series, 1 episode
1990	TV Celebrity Dance Party	Herself performs "Do You Wanna Dance"	TV special
1991	Tonight Live With Steve Vizard	Herself	TV series, 1 episode
1991	The Midday Show	Herself	TV series, 1 episode
1991	Lethal Impact	Chris' doctor	Video UK
1992	Great Performances	French / Party Guests / Snow Flowers	TV series US
1992	The Morning Show	Herself	TV series, 1 episode
1992	In Sydney Today	Herself	TV series, 1 episode
1992	All Together Now	Julie	TV series, 1 episode
1992	The World Tonight: Beauty And The Beast segment	Herself	TV series, 1 episode
1996	In Suspicious Circumstances	Georgina Moore	TV series UK

=== Singer ===
Megan Williams appeared in the Film Clip of "The Queen and Me" with Mondo Rock (1982). Williams provided backing vocals for "Flame Trees" on Cold Chisel's Twentieth Century (1984). John Prior (drummer with Matt Finish) wrote songs for Williams in the mid-1980s.

=== Pilates teacher ===
Williams was instrumental in bringing Pilates to Australia, as she was doing exercise/rehab for Sydney Dance Company and others. She was one of the founders of The Australian Pilates Method Association.

== Personal life ==
Williams was in a de facto relationship with Cold Chisel singer-guitarist Ian Moss for 11 years, before they separated in the 1990s.

Williams had an operation for breast cancer in 1997; however, the disease was diagnosed again in December 1999. She died at Darlinghurst Sacred Heart Hospice, Sydney, on 17 April 2000, aged 43.
