= Flame Trees =

1984 single by Cold Chisel

Single by Cold Chisel

from the album Twentieth Century
- B-side: "River Deep Mountain High" (Live)
- Released: August 1984
- Recorded: 1983
- Genre: Pub rock
- Length: 4:24
- Label: WEA
- Songwriters: Steve Prestwich and Don Walker

Cold Chisel singles chronology
| "Twentieth Century" (1984) | "Flame Trees" (1984) | "Misfits" (1991) |

"Flame Trees" is a song by Australian pub rock band Cold Chisel from their 1984 album Twentieth Century. One of their best known songs, it was written by drummer Steve Prestwich and keyboardist Don Walker. On its release it reached No. 26 on the Kent Music Report Singles Chart. It resurfaced in August 2011 due to download sales, peaking at No. 54 on the ARIA chart.

In January 2018, as part of Triple M's "Ozzest 100" of the 'most Australian' songs of all time, "Flame Trees" was ranked number 12. In 2025 the song was voted 7th in the Triple J Hottest 100 of Australian Songs.

== Background ==
According to the band's official website, Walker's inspiration for the lyrics was a combination of his memories of Grafton where he had lived as a youth, and of his romantic dreams. The music had already been written, on a bass, by Prestwich. The song was then played to Walker, "in assorted back rooms" with Prestwich asking, "Got any words for this?" Walker noted, "When I received it with no words, I could tell it had an emotional profile – it gathers up the threads; there's a big key change, [and] if you can fire a cannon ball through the park on the key change you have a winner." Ian Moss said, "The next day, after having like an hour's sleep, Don came in with this fantastic story. Don's one of those uni student dudes who's like, 'This project's got to be in, so I'll get it done by hook or by crook.'" Prestwich said, "When I heard Don's lyrics, I told him, 'Mate, I don't know if they're right for the music.' I've grown used to them now." Walker later said, "I don't think it was the story he was expecting. He wasn't overjoyed when he heard the lyrics." A review in RAM said an early version of the song had, "an appalling C&W monologue midway through."

Walker later said, "In my mind, it’s a northern New South Wales song. But there’s a lot of people who love that song and in their minds, it’s set in their home towns. A lot of people finish up away from where they come from." Elsewhere, Walker noted that the song was "not fiction", and about, "returning home after some success in the big city".

The phrase that appears in the chorus, "nothing else could set fire to this town", refers back to the Cold Chisel song "Merry Go Round". Walker said, "it's got this phrase in it 'I'm going to set fire to the town'. We played that every night as we went from clubs to stadiums and every town around the place. "Flame Trees" was a song that was written at the end of our career, pretty much as we were breaking up. It only appears in two songs, once at the beginning of our ascent and once when the band was in a death dive."

The reference to flame trees instead of the jacarandas for which Grafton is famous, due to its annual Jacaranda Festival, is partly because of a TV miniseries, the BBC's The Flame Trees of Thika (1981), starring Hayley Mills, "an old flame of the lyricist's dreams". Elsewhere, Walker claimed the use was because one of his bandmates was "very sexually attracted to Hayley Mills". However, Grafton is well known for its many specimens of the Australian native rainforest tree Brachychiton acerifolius, commonly known as the Illawarra Flame Tree, which along with the more pervasive, introduced poincianas and the town's famous (also introduced) jacarandas, set its streets ablaze every spring.

Moss's then-girlfriend, Megan Williams, provides backing vocals. Prestwich had been replaced by Ray Arnott for the album Twentieth Century, but "Flame Trees" was one of three songs to feature Prestwich, based on a demo he had recorded before his departure. Prestwich was asked to come into the studio for the recording and made many of the production decisions, including flying Venetta Fields in for backing vocals.

a screenshot from the music video

== Music video ==
The video of the song (directed by Kimble Rendall) was filmed in Oberon, New South Wales. It portrays a young man returning to his home town, meeting old friends, and remembering a past lover. The members of Cold Chisel have bit parts, except for Jimmy Barnes, who only appears courtesy of some footage from The Last Stand. Barnes said, "The band was arguing so much that "Flame Trees" and the making of the clip, well, they never even told me, that's why I wasn't in it - the band weren't even talking to me at that point."

== Reception ==
The Sydney Morning Herald asked, "Is it a love song? If so, to what? It's undoubtedly one of the great Australian rock songs, but what is it? It's equally nostalgia, longing and love. A man goes back to the Australian bush town where he was raised and feels nostalgia at what he recalls, but distaste at how little things have changed."

Elly McDonald at Rock Australia Magazine said, "The tune is lovely, with the melodic quality we've come to expect from Prestwich."

== Recording credits ==
- Jimmy Barnes - lead vocals
- Ian Moss - electric guitar, backing vocals
- Don Walker - Yamaha CP70 electric grand piano, Hammond organ
- Steve Prestwich - drums
- Phil Small - fretless bass
- Megan Williams - backing vocals
- Venetta Fields - backing vocals

== Charts ==
| Chart (1984) | Peak position |
|---|---|
| Australia (Kent Music Report) | 26 |

== Certifications ==
Certifications for "Flame Trees"
| Region | Certification | Certified units/sales |
|---|---|---|
| New Zealand (RMNZ) | Platinum | 30,000^{‡} |
^{‡} Sales+streaming figures based on certification alone.

== Cover versions ==
"Flame Trees"

Single by Sarah Blasko
- Released: 18 March 2006
- Genre: Indie pop, soft rock
- Length: 5:23
- Label: Dew Process
- Songwriters: Steve Prestwich and Don Walker
- Producers: Jim Moginie & Wayne Connolly

Sarah Blasko singles chronology
| "Don't U Eva" (2004) | "Flame Trees" (2006) | "{Explain" (2006) |

In the 2005 Australian film Little Fish, the song is sung by The Sacred Heart School Choir from Cabramatta. The children in the choir appear in the film performing the song during a pivotal scene, and their version is repeated during the closing credits. This version was released as a single in 2006.

Don Walker said of this version, "A children's choir like that, it can't miss; they'll break your heart no matter what they sing." Of the scene in the movie, Walker said it was, "uncomfortable to watch for anyone who's ever shared accommodation where heroin is part of the commerce."

Singer Sarah Blasko also recorded a cover version for Little Fish, which was released as a stand-alone download-only single on the Australian iTunes Music Store, and later included on the 2007 tribute album Standing on the Outside: The Songs of Cold Chisel. The Blasko version of "Flame Trees" was voted in at number 15 in the 2005 Triple J Hottest 100 songs. Blasko later said, "It's still probably the most asked-for song at my shows, much to my annoyance because of course everyone wants to be known for their own music. But it's a testament to its resonance and place in Australian culture."

The song was featured in a documentary on the "Choir of Hard Knocks", a Melbourne choir comprising a group of homeless people. It was also performed by The Whitlams' Tim Freedman on an episode of The Panel. Jimmy Barnes recorded an acoustic version of the track on his 1993 album Flesh and Wood.

The song was also covered by The Killjoys in 1994 on a compilation CD titled Earth Music, which featured many prominent artists covering well known songs.

Jessica Mauboy covered the song on her 2016 album, The Secret Daughter: Songs from the Original TV Series.
