= Choirgirl (song) =

1979 single by Cold Chisel

Single by Cold Chisel

from the album East
- B-side: "Conversations" (live)
- Released: November 1979
- Recorded: 3–14 October 1979, Paradise Studios, Sydney
- Genre: Pub rock
- Label: WEA
- Songwriter: Don Walker
- Producer: Mark Opitz

Cold Chisel singles chronology
"Shipping Steel" (1979)	"Choirgirl" (1979)	"Cheap Wine" (1980)

"Choirgirl" (also released as "Choir Girl" on subsequent releases) is a song by Australian rock band Cold Chisel, released as the lead single from their third studio album East (1980) in November 1979. A ballad written by Don Walker with an R&B-influenced melody, the song marked the first time the band had recorded with producer Mark Opitz. It peaked at No. 14 in Australia on the Kent Music Report.

== Details ==
Songwriter Don Walker said of the song: "I made a conscious attempt to write a hit single. It was a matter of pride and craft. And then I thought, 'What'll I write it about...' I wrote it about pregnancy termination and it was a massive hit." At the time of release, many people seemed unaware of the subject matter, and the song was played on radio stations 2SM and 3XY owned by the Catholic Church. Singer Jimmy Barnes said, "Even though nobody knew what "Choirgirl" was about, everybody felt an emotional connection."

Producer Mark Opitz said, "I used all the old Alberts Tricks as we built "Choirgirl" - where to bring in the backing vocals, have a half-chorus first...all the things I'd learned from Vanda & Young about keeping the listener interested." Walker said, "Mark was the first person who came along who took the barriers away, who said, "Yes, doing that is not a problem. In fact, that's the way we should do it."

The song is driven by Walker's Yamaha CP-70 electric grand piano, and, although Jimmy Barnes sings lead on most of the song, Ian Moss provides close harmonies on the second verse and sings lead vocals on the bridge.

A 12" version was also released, featuring an additional live version of "Khe Sanh" on the B-side.

An appearance on Countdown was made to promote the song, with the band wearing matching white clothes and miming.

Walker later said of the song, "Things can be intensely personal when you write them, but then that gets graded away as you play it 200 times a year over the subsequent five years and then gets played on the radio fifteen times a day right across the country for the next twenty years. It's like saying the same phrase over and over again, it becomes meaningless."

The original album credits for the album East list the song as "Choirgirl", but on some subsequent releases it is written "Choir Girl".

== Reception ==
The single reached No. 14 on the Australian Kent Music Report chart in November 1979 and was Cold Chisel's first top 20 hit to chart, after chart successes with "Khe Sanh" (1978) which reached No. 41, "Goodbye (Astrid Goodbye)" (1978) which reached No. 65 and "Breakfast at Sweethearts" (1979) which reached No. 63. Don Walker was nominated for Best Recorded Songwriter at the 1979 TV Week/Countdown Music Awards for the song.

Writing for RAM in 1980, Greg Taylor said the song contained "a melody of stately, implacable logic, sung by Barnes in a angel voice".

== Cover versions ==
- In 2007, Australian singer Katie Noonan recorded the song for the Cold Chisel tribute album Standing on the Outside. It was also included as a bonus track on her album Skin, released in the same year.
- In 2013, Australian singer Taylor Henderson recorded a version for his eponymous debut studio album.

== Personnel ==
- Jimmy Barnes – lead vocals
- Ian Moss – lead vocals (bridge), harmony and backing vocals, electric guitar
- Don Walker – Yamaha CP-70 electric grand piano, backing vocals
- Phil Small – bass, backing vocals
- Steve Prestwich – drums

== Charts ==
=== Weekly charts ===
Weekly chart performance for "Choirgirl"
Chart (1979–1980)	Peak position
Australia (Kent Music Report)	14

=== Year-end charts ===
Year-end chart performance for "Choirgirl"
Chart (1980)	Position
Australia (Kent Music Report)	100

== Certifications ==
Certifications for "Choirgirl"
Region	Certification	Certified units/sales
New Zealand (RMNZ)	Gold	15,000^{‡}
^{‡} Sales+streaming figures based on certification alone.
