= Khe Sanh (song) =

1978 single by Cold Chisel

Single by Cold Chisel

from the album Cold Chisel
- B-side: "Just How Many Times"
- Released: May 1978
- Recorded: 1978
- Genre: Pub rock
- Length: 4:09
- Label: WEA
- Songwriter: Don Walker
- Producer: Peter Walker

Cold Chisel singles chronology
"Khe Sanh" (1978)	"Goodbye (Astrid Goodbye)" (1978)

Music video
- "Khe Sanh" on YouTube

"Khe Sanh" is the debut single by Australian rock band Cold Chisel, released in May 1978 as a 45 rpm single, and named after the district capital of Hướng Hóa District, Quảng Trị Province, Vietnam. Written by pianist Don Walker, "Khe Sanh" concerns an Australian Vietnam veteran dealing with his return to civilian life. According to Toby Creswell's liner notes for the band's 1991 compilation album Chisel, the song is also a story of restless youth. A further context of the song is that "soldiers met a hostile reception on their return home".

"Khe Sanh" is one of the most popular songs ever recorded by an Australian act and one generally seen as a resonant symbol of the Australian culture. AllMusic describes it as, "a song that will forever epitomize this period of Australian music." It has been included in the National Film and Sound Archive of Australia.

== Composition ==
The mood of the song is typified by its first verse:

I left my heart to the sappers round Khe Sanh
And my soul was sold with my cigarettes to the black market man
I've had the Vietnam cold turkey
From the ocean to the Silver City
And it's only other vets could understand

The remaining verses describe the singer's aimless drifting after his return to Australia: womanising, post traumatic stress disorder, addiction to speed and Novocaine, getting work on oil rigs and flying helicopters. He has travelled the world: "I've been back to South East Asia but the answer sure ain't there". The final refrain is "Well the last plane out of Sydney's almost gone", as the singer heads to Hong Kong for casual sex.

Don Walker has said the song was inspired by a number of people, including, "the guy from the next farm," who came back from Vietnam, "severely changed for the worst," (sic) and Adelaide guitarist Rick Morris. The first draft was written in Sweethearts Cafe in Kings Cross, New South Wales. Walker said he "killed a couple of afternoons" putting down the lyrics, "for my own enjoyment and amusement," in the days before the band had a recording contract. "If I had imagined anybody would see those lyrics, I probably would have written them a bit differently."

"Khe Sanh"

Singer Jimmy Barnes said of the writing process: "Don Walker used to write great songs, but he'd take months and months, and you wouldn't know about them until he'd turn up that day and say, 'Let's learn it.' I remember we were doing a gig somewhere, it might have been in Melbourne, and Don walked in and said, 'I've got this song. Let's do it tonight. It's really easy.' And it really was easy for them, because there are not many chords, but for me it's like a novel. I had to learn all the words that day." Walker said, "I originally wrote it as a punk song, but we found it worked better with a country-rock approach."

Don Walker later described it as the type of song that would be written by an author who had yet to learn the established forms of songwriting. "It doesn't follow any of those rules, it has no chorus. The punchline of it is a line out of a verse, it had nothing to do with the title."

== Popularity ==
In August 1978, censors gave the song an A Classification, meaning that it was "not suitable for airplay". The classification was ostensibly due to sex and drug references, such as the lines: "their legs were often open, but their minds were always closed". Walker said, "That was the reason they told us, which wasn't necessarily the real one." Barnes later commented "Every DJ in the country begged us to release "Khe Sanh" as a single. Then they banned it two weeks later. They had to ban something once a week to keep the Catholic Church happy." Although it peaked on the national sales charts at a modest number 41, the record reached number four in the band's home town of Adelaide where it received airplay on 5KA (owned by the Methodist Church). At the start of the Live at the Wireless album, Barnes thanks Double J for being the only Sydney station that played the song.

In 2001, members of APRA, the Australasian music industry's peak body, put "Khe Sanh" at number eight in a poll of the all-time best Australian songs. It still receives strong airplay on Australian radio stations with a "classic rock" format. In November 2014, "Khe Sanh" was added to the National Film and Sound Archive's Sounds of Australia registry of historically, culturally and aesthetically significant sound recordings.

In August 2011, "Khe Sanh" re-entered the ARIA Singles Chart at #40, beating their previous peak position by one spot.

In January 2018, as part of Triple M's "Ozzest" 100, the 'most Australian' songs of all time, "Khe Sanh" was ranked number 1, ahead of Men at Work's "Down Under" and Jimmy Barnes's "Working Class Man".

Named by Double J as one of the best debut singles of all time, they said, "Walker jumped inside the psyche of a Vietnam Vet and laid it all bare: PTSD, drug addiction, reliance on overseas sex workers for intimacy, and a constant sense of unease and displacement. It's a song pulsing with palpable paranoia, ambivalence, and deep-seated mental illness."

It was ranked at number 8 in the Triple J Hottest 100 of Australian Songs held on July 25, 2025.

Cold Chisel has released 15 records/CDs/compilations of Khe Sanh from 1978 to 2024, and Jimmy Barnes has issued further 4 compilations from 1996 to 2002 demonstrating its continued popularity.

== Versions ==
Three studio versions of "Khe Sanh" were released by Cold Chisel. The first featured on the band's 1978 debut self-titled album. A second version was included on the international version of the 1980 album East and omits the piano introduction. A third version with a re-recorded vocal from Barnes was released on the Radio Songs greatest hits album and all future compilations.

A notable cover of the song was released in 2007 by Australian singer/songwriter Paul Kelly. This rendering was in a stripped down bluegrass/country style, featuring largely spoken lyrics. It was released on the tribute album Standing on the Outside.

Adam Brand includes the chorus of "Khe Sanh" at the end of his single "Comin' From/Khe Sanh" from his fifth album Blame It on Eve.

John Schumann covered "Khe Sanh" on his 2008 album Behind the Lines. As a member of folk-rock band Redgum, Schumann wrote and sang another hit song about Australians in Vietnam: "I Was Only 19", released in 1983.

== Other details ==
The Battle of Khe Sanh was fought between US Marines with elements of the South Vietnamese ARVN, and the North Vietnamese Army. The only Australian personnel to be directly involved in the siege were the crews of Canberra bombers operated by 2 Squadron, Royal Australian Air Force, who flew close air support missions in the area.

"Sanh" is often misspelled (even, at times, on official album covers and sleeve notes) as "Sahn".

During the Australian cricket team's tour of the Caribbean in 1994–1995, the players accorded "Khe Sanh" the status of an unofficial team song and sang it frequently. "I've heard them. They're shocking," Barnes has said.

Khe Sanh has also been mentioned in another frequently misinterpreted song. Bruce Springsteen's 1984 hit "Born in the USA" includes the sentence: "Had a brother at Khe Sanh". Springsteen pronounces it to rhyme with "barn" rather than with "man", as the Cold Chisel version does.

A video was made to promote the single, directed by Paul Drane. It was filmed in a movie studio in Melbourne, and featured the band miming to the song, interspersed with some sepia-toned footage of the band backstage.

== Recording credits ==
- Jimmy Barnes – lead vocals
- Ian Moss – backing vocals, electric guitar
- Don Walker – piano, Hammond organ
- Steve Prestwich – drums
- Phil Small – bass
- Peter Walker – acoustic guitar
- Dave Blight – harmonica

== Charts ==
Chart (1978)	Peak position
Australia (Kent Music Report)	41
Chart (2011)	Peak position
Australia (ARIA)	40

== Certifications ==
Certifications for "Khe Sanh"
Region	Certification	Certified units/sales
New Zealand (RMNZ)	3× Platinum	90,000^{‡}
^{‡} Sales+streaming figures based on certification alone.

== See also ==
- Battle of Khe Sanh
- List of songs about the Vietnam War
