= East (Cold Chisel album) =

Studio album by Cold Chisel
- Released: 2 June 1980
- Recorded: March–April 1980
- Studios: Paradise Studios, Sydney
- Genre: Pub rock
- Length: 42:06
- Label: WEA
- Producers: Mark Opitz; Cold Chisel

Cold Chisel chronology
Breakfast at Sweethearts (1979)	East (1980)	Swingshift (1981)

Singles from East
- 1. "Choirgirl" Released: November 1979; 2. "Cheap Wine" Released: May 1980; 3. "My Baby" Released: August 1980

East is the third studio album by Australian pub rock band Cold Chisel, released in June 1980. The album peaked at No. 2 and spent 63 weeks on the national chart. It was the biggest-selling Australian album release of the year. It was the only Cold Chisel album to chart in America, reaching 171 on the Billboard 200 in 1981. It also reached number 32 on the New Zealand charts.

== History ==
The album was preceded by the release of the single "Choirgirl" that was recorded in October 1979 and released in November, the band's first recording with Mark Opitz who would then work on all subsequent 1980s Cold Chisel albums. The bulk of the album was recorded in March and April 1980, with the band having completed little writing before entering the studio. Opitz said, "The band still wanted to work with another producer, but he wasn't available so a week before commencement they said seeing as you did the single you can do the album." Opitz later said, "I booked Paradise as a lock-out, which meant Chisel had sole 24-hour access. The only people allowed in were friends of the band and roadies. I did that to make sure the roadies got their free feed."

The songs "Cheap Wine" and "My Baby" were also released as singles. East was the first Cold Chisel album to feature tracks written by all members of the band. Opitz said, "One of the key aspects was breaking Don's songwriting monopoly. It gave variation to the record and confidence to the players. Don was comfortable with this changed dynamic, because it meant he no longer had to come up with all the songs." Barnes later said, "They literally had to drag us out of the studio. Each of us was saying, 'Wait. I've got another song.'"

East was a deliberate attempt by Cold Chisel to make a more commercial album. Walker said at the time, "I go to bed with a tape recorder under my pillow. The tape loop says, 'hit single, hit single, hit single.'" Allmusic describes the album as, "their most widely accepted and artfully constructed album." Producer Opitz said of the pressure for commercial success, "My brief to myself was: “I don’t want to sacrifice the credibility of the band, but I still need hits.” Of course, the band at that stage were letting me have my total way with them. Because they weren’t a successful recording band."

Barnes was using a combination of speed and red wine to improve his vocal performance in the studio. Walker said, "Jim had developed into the most incredible singer. He could do anything. He could sing melodies in a way that made it sound not over-worked or thought about; it was effortless."

== Subject matter ==
Some of the songs were topical at the time of release. "Ita" referred to journalist and television presenter Ita Buttrose. "Star Hotel" is written about the riot that took place there, "Choirgirl" about abortion while "Four Walls" referenced the riots at Bathurst Gaol. Barnes later said, "At the time we'd been doing a hell of a lot of gigs in jails and Don had been really into it. He'd been talking to William Munday and all those people, and I don't think he knew why, but he was sort of obsessed with the penal system."

Later, Walker was described as keen to downplay the political nature of the songs. Walker said, "That whole East political thing, all those things were not necessarily said by us. Most of the themes were dreamed up by reviewers."

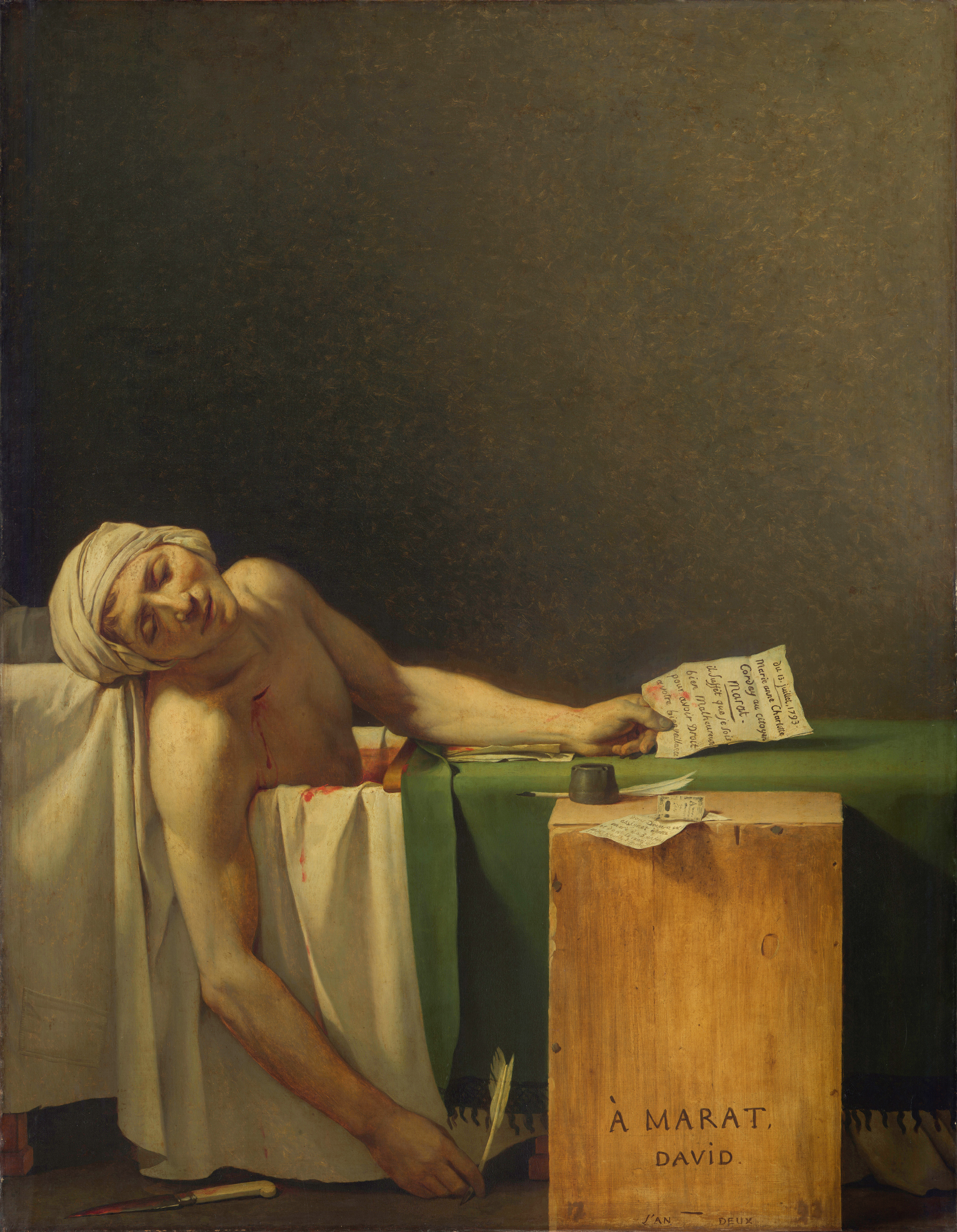
The Death of Marat (1793) by Jacques-Louis David inspired the album cover art.

== Cover ==
The cover art was inspired by the 1793 painting The Death of Marat by Jacques-Louis David. The photo of Barnes was taken at Roger Langford's apartment in Elizabeth Bay, where the video for "Cheap Wine" was later shot. Barnes had purchased the headband in Japan, and years later discovered he had worn it upside-down. Walker said, "I got the idea of the bathtub and the Marat/Sade ripoff. I knew I wanted to fill the whole thing up with certain flavoured bric-a-brac. Jenny spent a whole week getting the bric-a-brac together out of the antique shops and second-hand book shops. There was a certain list of books I wanted but she came back with some wonderful stuff I would never have thought of." Elsewhere, Walker said, "We knew Greg Noakes was the guy to do the photography, because he's been doing wonderful photography for us for years. After the photography, I had to go overseas, and Phillip Mortlock, Jenny, and Rod Willis were in charge of putting it all together."

== Releases ==
The first 10,000 pressings of the album came with a bonus single, a live cover of "Knocking on Heaven's Door" that had been recorded at the Bondi Lifesaver on the A-side, and a studio recording of "Party's Over" on the B-side. The international version of the album features a slightly different track listing, with no "Ita" or "Four Walls" on the B-side, but instead a rare acoustic intro version of the single Khe Sanh, never released anywhere else. The back cover of the album contains a different group photograph of the band members than what is seen on the Australian version, as it was felt the band would look like "a bunch of cowboys" to an American audience.

Cold Chisel's catalogue was re-released in collectors editions 2011. East re-entered the charts for 3 weeks, peaking at number 19.

== Reception ==
Professional ratings
Review scores
Source	Rating
AllMusic	4.5/5 stars

At the 1980 TV Week/Countdown Music Awards, East won a number of awards, including Best Australian Album, Best Australian Record Cover Design and Most Popular Record. In October 2010, East, was listed in the book, 100 Best Australian Albums with their 1982 album Circus Animals at No. 4. In December of 2021, the album was listed at number four in Rolling Stone Australia's "200 Greatest Albums of All Time" countdown.

In a 2011 Triple J poll, East was voted as the 21st best Australian album by industry pundits, and 42nd by station listeners. In a 2012 Triple M poll, 'East' was voted as the 3rd 'Greatest Rock Album of all Time'.

Rolling Stone Australia said at the time of release, "East has something quite different, quite unique in Australian music. In taking the diverse influences of Otis Redding, Elvis Presley, Sam Cooke, The Who and applying this sensibility to Australian context Cold Chisel have done something remarkable. East, quite simply, is a superb album." New Zealand magazine Rip It Up said, "the album displays the band utilising the whole range of contemporary influences, from blues to reggae, jazz to rockabilly. Cold Chisel have a fine precision when it comes to pop sensibilities." RAM called it, "hugely satisfying after a long wait. The arrangements really show the benefit of uninterrupted studio experiment. Barnes is singing superbly, a throat of gold."

A review at AllMusic described the album as Cold Chisel's, "slickest to date," and, "More commercial without compromising on the rawness of their roots." Reviewer Adrian Zupp gave the album a rating of four and a half stars from a possible five and summarised, "With East, Cold Chisel signaled that they had moved on up without selling out."

== Track listing ==
All songs written by Don Walker, except as noted.

=== Side one ===
1. "Standing on the Outside" – 2:53
2. "Never Before" (Ian Moss) – 4:09
3. "Choirgirl" – 3:14
4. "Rising Sun" (Jimmy Barnes) – 3:26
5. "My Baby" (Phil Small) – 4:02
6. "Tomorrow" – 3:33

=== Side two ===
1. "Cheap Wine" – 3:24
2. "Best Kept Lies" (Steve Prestwich) – 3:48
3. "Ita" – 3:33
4. "Star Hotel" – 4:10
5. "Four Walls" – 2:23
6. "My Turn to Cry" (Jimmy Barnes) – 3:31

=== International version ===
1. "Standing on the Outside"
2. "Never Before" (Ian Moss)
3. "Choirgirl"
4. "Rising Sun" (Jimmy Barnes)
5. "My Baby" (Phil Small)
6. "Tomorrow"
7. "Cheap Wine"
8. "Best Kept Lies" (Steve Prestwich)
9. "Khe Sanh"
10. "Star Hotel"
11. "My Turn to Cry" (Jimmy Barnes)

== Charts ==
=== Weekly charts ===
Chart (1980–2011)	Peak position
Australian Albums (Kent Music Report)	2
New Zealand Albums (RMNZ)	32

=== Year-end charts ===
It was the highest selling album by an Australian artist in Australia in 1980.

Chart (1980)	Position
Australian Albums (Kent Music Report)	4

== Certifications ==
Region	Certification	Certified units/sales
Australia (ARIA)	5× Platinum	350,000^{^}
^{^} Shipments figures based on certification alone.

== See also ==
- List of Top 25 albums for 1980 in Australia

== Personnel ==
- Jim Barnes – vocals
- Don Walker – organ, piano
- Ian Moss – guitar, backing vocals; vocals (tracks 2, 5 and 8)
- Phil Small – bass
- Steve Prestwich – drums
- Joe Camilleri – saxophone (track 5)
