= Phil Small =

Australian musician and songwriter (born 1954)

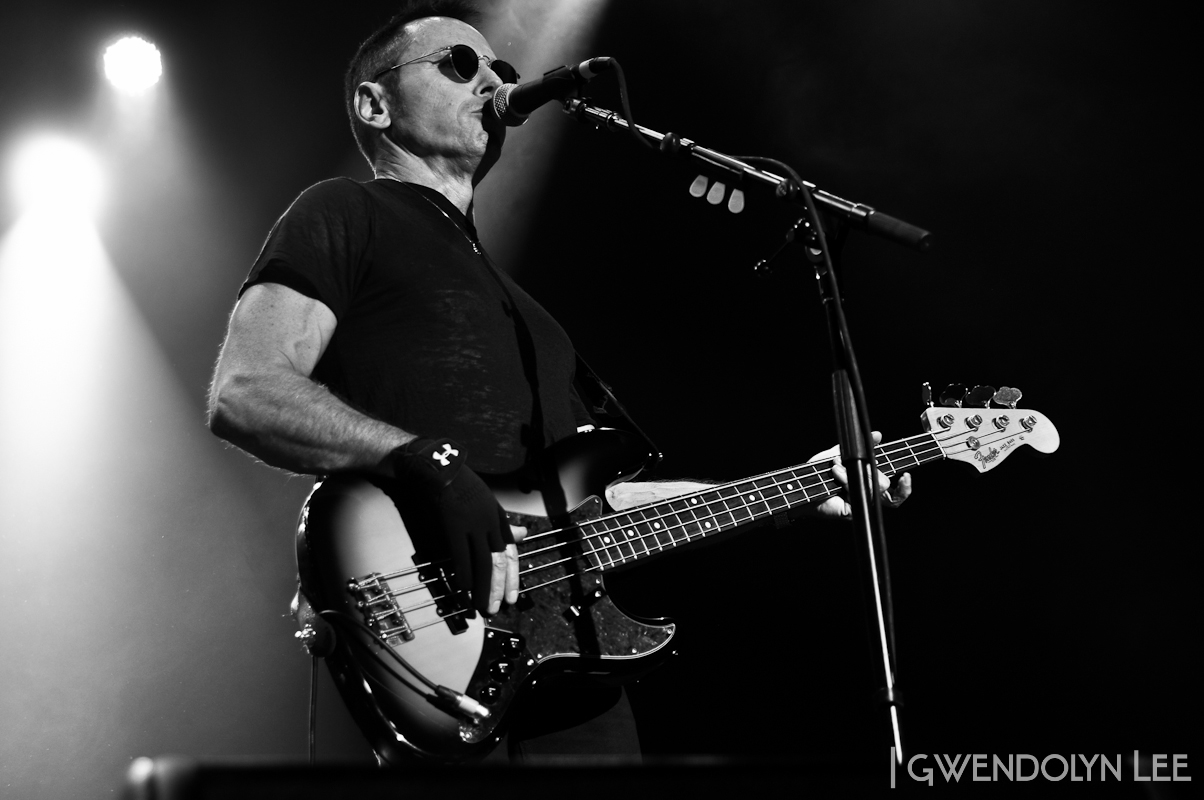
- Small with Cold Chisel in 2012

Background information
- Born: Phillip James Small; 2 August 1954 (age 71); Adelaide, South Australia, Australia
- Genres: Pub rock
- Occupations: Musician, songwriter
- Instruments: Bass, vocals
- Years active: 1971–present

Phillip James Small (born 2 August 1954) is an Australian musician and songwriter, who is the bass guitarist for the pub rock band Cold Chisel. He has written songs for Cold Chisel including the hit single, "My Baby" (sung by the band's guitarist Ian Moss rather than usual lead singer Jimmy Barnes), for the 1980 album East, "Notion for You" off the Teenage Love album and "The Game" (from Twentieth Century). For Cold Chisel's 1998 comeback album, The Last Wave of Summer, Small contributed the unnamed fifteenth track, "Once Around the Sun", as well as co-writing with Steve Prestwich and Don Walker, "A Better Time a Better Place", as a B side to one of the singles.

Small has played in a number of other bands such as Planet (1971), Palladium (1972), Pound (1985), The Earls of Duke (1985–1988), Hot Ice (1986), The Outsiders (1989) and Billy Thorpe Band (2005). He also played with fellow Cold Chisel members, Jimmy Barnes in his band for the 1999 tour; and Ian Moss in late 2000 through the eastern states of Australia.

In 2003 Small joined the reformed Cold Chisel to perform and record the Ringside album and DVD. In 2005 he performed with Cold Chisel at the tsunami benefit concert at the Myer Music Bowl in Melbourne. Small has continued song writing and performing through the 2000s.

Small is married to Christine and they have a child. When describing his song, "My Baby", he explained "Luckily, being in the studio, we were able to whack the idea down on tape pretty much straight away. Everyone seems to think it's written about Christine, my wife; maybe subconsciously it is."
