= Steve Prestwich =

Australian musician (1954–2011)

Background information
- Born: Steven William Prestwich; 5 March 1954; Liverpool, England
- Origin: Adelaide, South Australia, Australia
- Died: 16 January 2011 (aged 56) Sydney, New South Wales, Australia
- Genres: Rock, pub rock
- Occupations: Musician, producer
- Instruments: Drums; percussion; guitar; vocals
- Years active: 1970–2011
- Formerly of: Cold Chisel, Little River Band

Steven William Prestwich (5 March 1954 – 16 January 2011) was an English-born Australian drummer, guitarist, singer and songwriter. After relocating from Liverpool, Prestwich was the founding and long-term drummer for the band Cold Chisel, which formed in Adelaide in 1973. He wrote the Cold Chisel songs "When the War Is Over", "Flame Trees", and "Forever Now". Prestwich also had a short spell with the Little River Band in the 1980s. He released two solo albums in the 2000s.

Prestwich died on 16 January 2011 following surgery to remove a brain tumour, at age 56.

== Early life and education ==
Steven William Prestwich was born on 5 March 1954 in Liverpool, England. He was a member of a folk-rock band called Sandy in 1970.

His family relocated to Adelaide, South Australia in 1971 when he was 17.

== Career ==
Prestwich was a member of Elizabeth band Ice from 1971 to 1973.

In 1973, he was the founding drummer for heavy metal group, Orange, with the line-up of Jimmy Barnes, Ian Moss, Don Walker, and Leszek Kaczmarek. Orange evolved into Cold Chisel in 1974 and a year later, Kaczmarek was replaced by Phil Small. Prestwich remained a member until early 1983, and briefly rejoined the band for their Last Stand Tour from October to December 1983.

During his time in Cold Chisel, Prestwich wrote "When the War Is Over" and "Forever Now". Both songs appeared on the 1982 album Circus Animals. He also co-wrote with Walker the song Flame Trees from the 1984 album Twentieth Century.

From 1984 to 1986 Prestwich was the drummer in the Little River Band. He toured the United States and released two albums with the band. Little River Band recorded a version of "When the War is Over" with John Farnham on vocals.

Prestwich rejoined Cold Chisel in later reformations.

He released his first solo album, Since You've Been Gone, in August 2000, which he also produced. His second album, Every Highway, was released in October 2009.

== Personal life, death, and legacy ==
Prestwich was the father of a daughter, Melody, and a son, Vaughan.

Prestwich died on 16 January 2011 at the age of 56 at the Macquarie University Hospital in Sydney after not regaining consciousness following brain surgery to remove a tumour diagnosed less than two weeks before.

Cold Chisel singer Jimmy Barnes later planted a flame tree in Prestwich's memory at the National Arboretum Canberra.

== Discography ==
=== Albums ===
List of albums, with selected details
| Title | Details |
|---|---|
| Since You've Been Gone | Released: August 2000; Format: CD; Label: BiGBanG (BB001) |
| Every Highway | Released: October 2009; Format: CD; Label: BiGBanG (BB002) |
