= Pub rock (Australia) =

Style of Australian rock and roll

Australian pub rock
- Stylistic origins: Hard rock; blues rock
- Cultural origins: 1970s, Australia

Pub rock is a style of Australian rock and roll that peaked in popularity throughout the 1970s and 1980s, and that continues to influence Australian music into the 21st century. It is named after the live music circuit in which most associated bands developed their sound: inner-city and suburban pubs. These often noisy, hot, small and crowded venues favoured loud, riff-based heavy rock.

Australian pub rock emerged in the early 1970s, with bands such as Billy Thorpe & the Aztecs, Buffalo, Coloured Balls and Blackfeather pioneering the sound by incorporating hard rock and blues rock, and occasionally elements of progressive rock and psychedelic rock. It developed separately from British pub rock, with the Australian sound being heavier, bluesier and more hard-edged. Later acts such as AC/DC, Rose Tattoo and Cold Chisel expanded the sound further and achieved mainstream success.

In a few Australian cities, particularly Melbourne, pub rock was associated with the Sharpies youth subculture.

== History ==
=== Background ===
The emergence of the Australian version of the pub rock genre and the related pub circuit was the result of several interconnected factors. From the 1950s to the 1970s, mainly because of restrictive state liquor licensing laws, only a small proportion of live pop and rock music in Australia was performed on licensed premises (mostly private clubs or discotheques); the majority of concerts were held in non-licensed venues like community, church or municipal halls. These concerts and dances were 'all-ages' events—often with adult supervision—and alcohol was not served.

During the 1960s, however, Australian states began liberalising their licensing laws. Sunday Observance Acts were repealed, pub opening hours were extended, discriminatory regulations — such as the long-standing ban on women entering or drinking in public bars — were removed, and in the 1970s the age of legal majority was lowered from 21 to 18. Concurrently, the members of the so-called "Baby Boomer" generation — who were the main audience for pop and rock music — were reaching their late teens and early twenties, and were thus able to enter such licensed premises. Pub owners soon realised that providing live music (which was often free) would draw young people to pubs in large numbers, and regular rock performances soon became a fixture at many pubs.

=== First bands emerge ===
In the early 1970s, Sydney-based groups such as Billy Thorpe & The Aztecs, Blackfeather and Buffalo pioneered the Australian pub rock sound. Billy Thorpe & The Aztecs consisted of Thorpe on lead vocals and guitar, Jimmy Thompson on drums, Paul Wheeler on bass guitar and Lobby Loyde (ex-Purple Hearts, Wild Cherries) on lead guitar. They released a cover version of Willie Dixon's "Good Morning, School Girl". They developed a heavy sound and in July 1970, Warren 'Pig' Morgan (piano, backing vocals) had joined and the band recorded The Hoax Is Over, which was released in January 1971. Thorpe described their sound: "[It was] like we were standing on a pair of Boeing 747 engines. It cracked the foundations and broke windows in neighbouring buildings".

By early 1971, Blackfeather consisted of Neale Johns on lead vocals, John Robinson on lead guitar (ex-Lonely Ones, Monday's Children, Dave Miller Set), Robert Fortesque on bass guitar, and Alexander Kash on drums. Their debut album, At the Mountains of Madness, appeared in April 1971. In May they had a hit with "Seasons of Change", which peaked at No. 15 on the Go-Set National Top 40 Singles Chart. Buffalo formed in August 1971 by Dave Tice on co-lead vocals (ex-Head) with Paul Balbi on drums, John Baxter on guitar and Peter Wells on bass guitar. Their debut album, Dead Forever..., appeared in June the following year. According to Australian rock music journalist, Ed Nimmervoll, "The seeds for Australian heavy rock can be traced back to two important sources, Billy Thorpe's Seventies Aztecs and Sydney band Buffalo". In 1972, Aztecs member Lobby Lloyd formed Coloured Balls, which became the favoured band of the sharpies youth subculture.

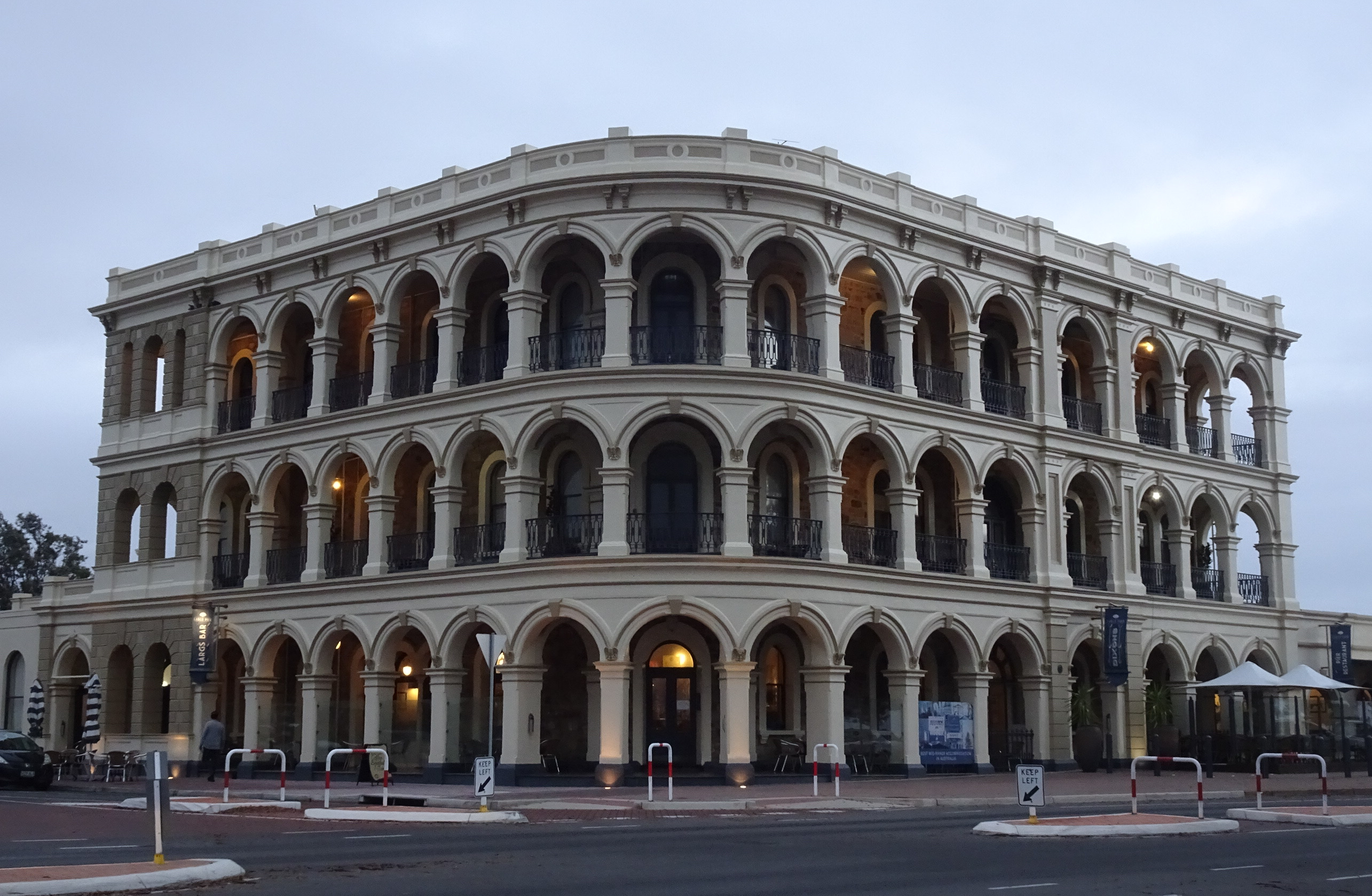
Largs Pier Hotel, Adelaide, a prominent pub rock venue

Notable pub-rock venues include the Largs Pier Hotel and the Governor Hindmarsh Hotel in Adelaide; the Royal Antler Hotel in Narrabeen, Sydney; the Civic Hotel in Sydney's city centre; the Star Hotel in Newcastle, New South Wales; and the Station Hotel in Prahran, Melbourne, which was one of the premier pub-rock venues in Australia for more than two decades. Additionally, Poyntons Carlton Club Hotel in Carlton was Melbourne's first Sunday night live pub-rock venue; Charles Hotel in Perth is the only remaining pub-rock venue in Perth.

=== Expansion of the sound ===
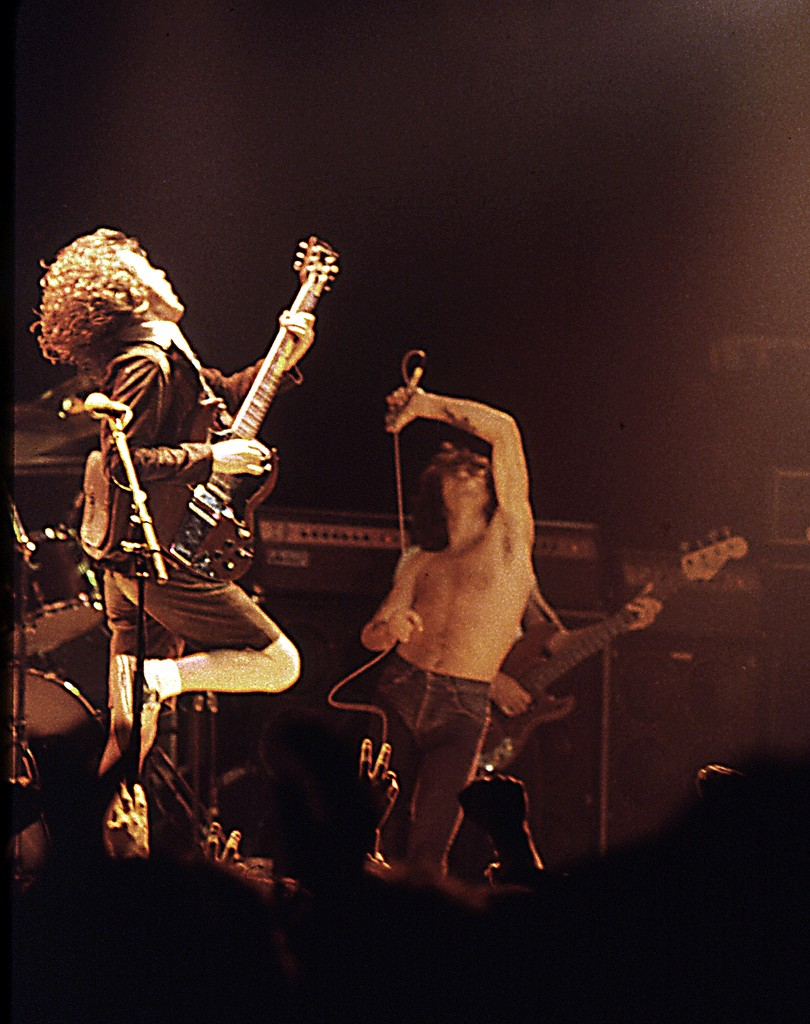
AC/DC grew out of the Australian pub rock scene.

Many city and suburban pubs gained renown for their support of live music, and many prominent Australian bands — including AC/DC, Cold Chisel, The Angels and The Dingoes — developed their style at these venues in the early days of their careers. Australian musicologist Ian McFarlane described how AC/DC took "the raw energy of Aussie pub rock, extend its basic guidelines, serve it up to a teenybop Countdown audience and still reap the benefits of the live circuit by packing out the pubs". He found that Cold Chisel "fused a combination of rockabilly, hard rock and rough-house soul'n'blues that was defiantly Australian in outlook". He noted The Angels had "a profound effect on the Australian live music scene of the late 1970s/early 1980s. [They] helped redefine the Australian pub rock tradition ... [their] brand of no-frills, hard-driving boogie rock attracted pub goers in unprecedented numbers". The Dingoes provided a "spirited combination of R&B, country and red-hot rock'n'roll was imbued with a delightful sense of time and place" according to McFarlane.

As the pub-rock phenomenon expanded, hundreds of hotels in capital cities and major towns began providing regular live music, and a thriving circuit evolved, enabling bands to tour up and down the eastern and southern coast of Australia from North Queensland to South Australia.

A band like Hunters & Collectors, for example, saw their sound harden from their arty origins (which included a brass section, experimental percussion, and complex arrangements) to a more straightforward rock sound with emphasis on drums, bass, and simple guitar riffs; it was a sound that more suited the beer barns they were to play in over their extensive touring career.

Though Australia has a relatively small population, the proportionally high number of venues that bands could play in, mainly along the Eastern coast, meant that a band could tour extensively, often playing every night for long periods. This would allow bands such as AC/DC, Cold Chisel, INXS, Midnight Oil, Rose Tattoo and others to build their reputation and take their live skills into large venues in the US and Europe with ease.

Several Australian pub rock bands, including Cosmic Psychos and feedtime, directly influenced the emergent grunge scene in the United States in the late 1980s and early 1990s. In the 2010s, a new generation of Australian bands revived the Australian pub rock sound, including Bad//Dreems, Amyl and the Sniffers and The Chats.

== See also ==
- Grunge
- List of public house topics
- Music of Australia
- Roots rock
