= 50 Years – The Best Of =

Compilation album by Cold Chisel
- Released: 16 August 2024
- Genre: Rock
- Length: 95:52
- Label: Universal
- Producer: Peter Walker; Richard Batchens; Mark Opitz; Cold Chisel; Kevin Shirley

Cold Chisel chronology
The Live Tapes Vol. 5 (2020)	50 Years – The Best Of (2024)	The Big Five-O Live (2025)

Singles from 50 Years – The Best Of
- 1. "You've Got to Move" Released: 25 July 2024

50 Years – The Best Of is a compilation album by Australian rock band Cold Chisel, released on 16 August 2024 through Universal Music Australia. The album was released to commemorate the band's 50th anniversary and to promote their Big Five-0 tour, which took place from October 2024 to January 2025. It contains 25 songs across two discs, including the new song, "You've Got to Move". It debuted at number one in Australia and number 23 in New Zealand.

== Commercial performance ==
It debuted at number one in Australia, making it the band's sixth number-one album, 18th top-10 album and their first compilation to top the chart. It was also the fourth of four consecutive Australian albums to top the chart.

== Track listing ==
Disc one track listing
No.	Title	Length
1.	"Standing on the Outside"	2:56
2.	"Cheap Wine"	3:25
3.	"When the War Is Over"	4:25
4.	"All for You"	4:57
5.	"My Baby"	4:01
6.	"Breakfast at Sweethearts"	4:09
7.	"You Got Nothing I Want"	3:16
8.	"Getting the Band Back Together"	3:59
9.	"Choirgirl"	3:14
10.	"Star Hotel"	4:08
11.	"Yakuza Girls"	2:25
12.	"The Things I Love in You"	3:19
13.	"Merry-Go-Round"	3:43
Total length:		47:57

Disc two track listing
No.	Title	Length
1.	"Khe Sanh"	4:10
2.	"Rising Sun"	3:26
3.	"Flame Trees"	4:24
4.	"No Sense"	2:59
5.	"Saturday Night"	4:21
6.	"Bow River"	4:21
7.	"Forever Now"	4:26
8.	"You've Got to Move"	3:51
9.	"Four Walls"	2:24
10.	"Lost"	4:05
11.	"Shipping Steel" (live; from The Live Tapes Vol. 2)	3:28
12.	"Goodbye (Astrid, Goodbye)" (live; from Swingshift)	6:00
Total length:		47:55; 95:52

== Charts ==
=== Weekly charts ===
Weekly chart performance for 50 Years – The Best Of
Chart (2024–2026)	Peak position
Australian Albums (ARIA)	1
New Zealand Albums (RMNZ)	23

=== Year-end charts ===
2024 year-end chart performance for 50 Years – The Best Of
Chart (2024)	Position
Australian Albums (ARIA)	44

2025 year-end chart performance for 50 Years – The Best Of
Chart (2025)	Position
Australian Albums (ARIA)	59
New Zealand Albums (RMNZ)	48

== Certifications ==
Certifications and sales for 50 Years – The Best Of
Region	Certification	Certified units/sales
New Zealand (RMNZ)	Gold	7,500^{‡}
^{‡} Sales+streaming figures based on certification alone.
