= The Studio Sessions 1978–1984 =

Box set by Cold Chisel
- Released: 6 December 1999
- Recorded: 1978–1984
- Genre: Rock, pub rock, Australian rock music
- Label: Warner Music Australia

Cold Chisel chronology
The Last Wave of Summer (1998)	The Studio Sessions 1978–1984 (1999)	Ringside (2003)

The Studio Sessions 1978–1984 is seven-disc, limited edition box set by Australian rock band Cold Chisel, released in Australia in December 1999. The box set contained five original studio albums, all remastered, restored and repackaged with bonus tracks, video clips, posters and photos from the era. Also includes a 2CD live album set entitled Swingshift.

== Track listing ==
CD 1 Cold Chisel, (1978)

1. "Juliet" - 2:43
2. "Khe Sanh" - 4:14
3. "Home and Broken Hearted" - 3:25
4. "One Long Day" - 7:23
5. "Northbound" - 3:14
6. "Rosaline" - 4:47
7. "Daskarzine" - 5:09
8. "Just How Many Times" - 5:13
9. "Teenage Love Affair" (bonus track)- 6:03
10. "Drinkin' in Port Lincoln" (bonus track)- 3:24
11. "H-Hour Hotel" (bonus track)- 3:26
12. "On the Road" (bonus track)- 3:13

CD 2 Breakfast at Sweethearts, (1979)

1. "Conversations" - 4:34
2. "Merry-Go-Round" - 3:44
3. "Dresden" - 3:58
4. "Goodbye (Astrid Goodbye)" - 2:51
5. "Plaza" - 2:09
6. "Shipping Steel" - 3:24
7. "I'm Gonna Roll Ya" - 3:28
8. "Showtime" - 3:44
9. "Breakfast at Sweethearts" - 4:11
10. "The Door" - 4:20
11. "It Ain't Wrong" (bonus track)- 3:13
12. "Mona and The Preacher" (bonus track)- 4:00
13. "Metho Blues" (bonus track)- 4:35

CD 3 East, (1980)

1. "Standing on the Outside" – 2:53
2. "Never Before"– 4:09
3. "Choirgirl" – 3:14
4. "Rising Sun"– 3:26
5. "My Baby"– 4:02
6. "Tomorrow" – 3:33
7. "Cheap Wine" – 3:24
8. "Best Kept Lies"– 3:48
9. "Ita" – 3:33
10. "Star Hotel" – 4:10
11. "Four Walls" – 2:23
12. "My Turn to Cry" – 3:31
13. "Pay Day in a Pub" (bonus track)– 4:53
14. "Hands Out of My Pocket" (bonus track)– 2:18
15. "The Party's Over" (bonus track)– 3:03

CD 4 Circus Animals, (1982)

1. "You Got Nothing I Want" - 3:16
2. "Bow River" - 4:23
3. "Forever Now" - 4:26
4. "Taipan" - 3:55
5. "Houndog" - 5:04
6. "Wild Colonial Boy" - 4:52
7. "No Good for You" - 3:16
8. "Numbers Fall" - 4:46
9. "When the War Is Over" - 4:25
10. "Letter to Alan" - 5:57
11. "Suicide Sal" (bonus track)– 2:46
12. "Notion for You" (bonus track)– 2:42
13. "F-111" (bonus track)– 3:51

CD 5 Twentieth Century, (1984)

1. "Build This Love" - 4:01
2. "Twentieth Century" - 2:17
3. "Ghost Town" - 1:20
4. "Saturday Night" - 4:26
5. "Painted Doll" - 2:19
6. "No Sense" - 3:10
7. "Flame Trees" - 4:24
8. "Only One" - 3:41
9. "Hold Me Tight" - 1:42
10. "Sing to Me" - 4:49
11. "The Game" - 5:13
12. "Janelle" - 3:40
13. "Temptation" - 3:23
14. "Nothing but You" (bonus track)– 4:30
15. "Yesterdays" (bonus track)– 4:04

CD 6 Swingshift (disc 1), (1981)

1. "Conversations"
2. "Shipping Steel"
3. "Breakfast at Sweethearts"
4. "Rising Sun"
5. "Choirgirl"
6. "Khe Sanh"
7. "My Turn to Cry"
8. "Four Walls"
9. "One Long Day"

CD 7 Swingshift (disc 2), (1981)

1. "Knockin' on Heaven's Door"
2. "My Baby"
3. "Star Hotel"
4. "Don't Let Go"
5. "Long as I Can See the Light"
6. "The Party's Over"
7. "Cheap Wine"
8. "Goodbye (Astrid Goodbye)"

== Release history ==
Region	Date	Format	Edition(s)	Label	Catalogue
Australia	6 December 1999	CD; digital download	Standard	Warner Music Australia	8573800802
