= Radio Songs: A Best of Cold Chisel =

Greatest hits album by Cold Chisel
- Released: 1985
- Recorded: 1978–1984
- Genre: Pub rock
- Label: WEA
- Producer: Cold Chisel, Mark Opitz, Dave Walsh

Cold Chisel chronology
Barking Spiders Live: 1983 (1984)	Radio Songs: A Best of Cold Chisel (1985)	Razor Songs (1987)

Radio Songs: A Best of Cold Chisel is the second greatest hits collection by Australian pub rock band Cold Chisel, and first compilation released in Australia. The album was released in 1985. It included tracks from their first five studio albums, Cold Chisel, Breakfast at Sweethearts, East, Circus Animals and Twentieth Century.

== Track listing ==
CD/ Vinyl.

1. A1 "Bow River" - 4:20
2. A2 "Cheap Wine" - 3:22
3. A3 "Goodbye (Astrid Goodbye)" - 2:49
4. A4 "No Sense" - 2:57
5. A5 "Breakfast at Sweethearts" - 4:08
6. A6 "Saturday Night" - 4:23
7. B1 "You Got Nothing I Want" - 3:16
8. B2 "My Baby" - 3:59
9. B3 "Forever Now" - 4:25
10. B4 "Khe Sanh" - 4:07
11. B5 "Choirgirl" - 3:14
12. B6 "Flame Trees" - 4:25
- Tracks A3, A5, B4 were remixed in October 1985.

== Charts ==
Chart (1985–86)	Peak position
Australia (Kent Music Report)	3
New Zealand Albums (RMNZ)	36
