= Chisel (album) =

Compilation album by Cold Chisel
- Released: September 1991
- Recorded: 1978–1984/1978–1998 (2001 edition)
- Genre: Rock
- Length: 72:35 (1998 edition)
- Label: Warner Music Australia
- Producer: Cold Chisel

Cold Chisel chronology
Razor Songs (1987)	Chisel (1991)	The Last Stand (1992)

Professional ratings
Review scores
Source	Rating
Allmusic	4.5/5 stars

Chisel is a compilation album by Australian pub rocker band Cold Chisel, released in September 1991. It features a selection of their best songs from previous albums, including live versions of the tracks "Bow River", "Merry-Go-Round," "Star Hotel" and "Goodbye (Astrid Goodbye)." The track "Misfits" was previously a B-side and was removed from later re-issues of this album. A limited edition release of this album included the long-deleted 1978 live EP You're Thirteen, You're Beautiful, and You're Mine.

The album peaked at number 3 on the ARIA Charts and was certified 9× Platinum in 2000.

== Track listing ==
1. "Standing on the Outside" (Don Walker)
2. "Rising Sun" (Jimmy Barnes)
3. "You Got Nothing I Want" (Barnes)
4. "No Sense" (Barnes)
5. "Misfits" (Walker)
6. "Breakfast at Sweethearts" (Walker)
7. "My Baby" (Phil Small)
8. "Bow River" (Ian Moss)
9. "Choirgirl" (Walker)
10. "Cheap Wine" (Walker)
11. "Forever Now" (Steve Prestwich)
12. "Saturday Night" (Walker)
13. "Flame Trees" (Walker, Prestwich)
14. "Merry-Go-Round" (Walker)
15. "Star Hotel" (Walker)
16. "Goodbye (Astrid Goodbye)" (Walker, Barnes)
17. "When the War Is Over" (Prestwich)
18. "Khe Sanh" (Walker)

== Remastered 2001 edition ==
2001 re-release of Chisel

In 2001 Cold Chisel's entire back catalogue was digitally remastered. To coincide with the new re-issues, Chisel was not only remastered but also expanded to include tracks from the 1998 reunion album The Last Wave of Summer. Featuring a new black cover, the 2001 version was also released as a limited 'bonus disc' edition which included a 20-page booklet.

== 2001 edition track listing ==
1. "Standing On The Outside" (2:54)
2. "Rising Sun" (3:26)
3. "The Things I Love in You" (3:19)
4. "Star Hotel" (4:07)
5. "When the War is Over" (4:24)
6. "Breakfast At Sweethearts" (4:11)
7. "My Baby" (4:02)
8. "You Got Nothing I Want" (3:16)
9. "Yakuza Girls" (2:25)
10. "Way Down" (3:56)
11. "Forever Now" (4:26)
12. "Cheap Wine" (3:23)
13. "Merry-Go-Round" (3:43)
14. "Water into Wine" (4:53)
15. "Bow River" (4:20)
16. "Flame Trees" (4:23)
17. "Saturday Night" (4:21)
18. "Goodbye (Astrid Goodbye)" (2:51)
19. "Choir Girl" (3:15)
20. "Khe Sanh" (4:11)

== Limited edition bonus disc ==
1. "Twentieth Century" (2:16)
2. "Home and Broken Hearted" (3:23)
3. "My Turn To Cry" (3:20)
4. "No Sense" (2:59)
5. "Four Walls" (2:25)
6. "Shipping Steel" (3:24)
7. "Conversations" (4:32)
8. "Never Before" (4:10)
9. "Ita" (3:34)
10. "Knockin' on Heaven's Door" (6:14)
11. "Hold Me Tight" (1:43)
12. "Best Kept Lies" (3:48)
13. "Georgia" (7:14)
14. "Wild Thing" (5:02)
15. "One Long Day" (7:21)
16. "The Last Wave of Summer" (5:22)

== Charts ==
=== Weekly charts ===
Chart (1991–2002)	Peak position
Australian Albums (ARIA)	3
New Zealand Albums (RMNZ)	16

=== Year-end charts ===
Chart (1991)	Position
Australian Albums Chart	11
Chart (1992)	Position
Australian Albums Chart	79
Chart (1994)	Position
Australian Albums Chart	72
Chart (1995)	Position
Australian Albums Chart	100
Chart (1998)	Position
Australian Albums Chart	97
Chart (1999)	Position
Australian Albums Chart	67
Chart (2001)	Position
Australian Albums Chart	85

== Certifications ==
Region	Certification	Certified units/sales
Australia (ARIA)	9× Platinum	630,000^{^}
^{^} Shipments figures based on certification alone.
