= Ringside (Cold Chisel album) =

Live album by Cold Chisel
- Released: November 2003
- Recorded: June 2003
- Genre: Pub rock
- Label: Elektra

Cold Chisel chronology
The Studio Sessions 1978-1984 (1999)	Ringside (2003)	Standing on the Outside (2007)

Ringside is a live album released by Cold Chisel in 2003. Recorded over 4 nights in June 2003, it peaked at number 27 in 2003 and peaked at number 16 following its vinyl release on 12 November 2021.

== Album details ==
The album contains two Steve Prestwich songs ("Lovelight", "All I Wanna Do") not released on any other Cold Chisel album, and "Fallen Angel", which was recorded by the band during sessions for The Last Wave of Summer but did not appear on the album, and later appeared on a solo Don Walker album. These were the first Cold Chisel songs to feature Prestwich and Walker on lead vocals.

Ringside features covers of Johnny Cash's "Big River", the standard "Cry Me a River", and Dragon's "Sunshine", written by Walker's friend Paul Hewson.

The concert was an attempt to feature the band, "performing in a smaller, intimate environment," and often, "in an acoustic format." Inspired by Elvis Presley's 1968 comeback special, there was a 360 degree view of the rotating stage, with the furthest seats from the stage being within 30 metres.

== Track listing ==
All songs written by Don Walker, except as noted.

=== Disc 1 ===
1. "Home And Broken Hearted" – 4:14
2. "The Things I Love in You" – 3:06
3. "Cheap Wine" – 3:45
4. "Rosaline" – 6:19
5. "Breakfast at Sweethearts" – 3:59
6. "My Baby" (Phil Small) – 4:13
7. "Houndog" – 4:59
8. "Plaza" – 2:48
9. "Fallen Angel" – 4:55
10. "Shipping Steel" – 4:13
11. "The Last Wave of Summer" – 5:49
12. "Pretty Little Thing" – 3:18
13. "Merry Go Round" – 4:25
14. "Forever Now" (Steve Prestwich) – 5:32
15. "Khe Sanh" – 4:47

=== Disc 2 ===
1. "Cry Me a River" (Arthur Hamilton) – 3:46
2. "Four Walls" – 3:08
3. "Lovelight" (Prestwich) – 3:33
4. "When the War is Over" (Prestwich) – 6:00
5. "All I Wanna Do (Steve Vocal)" (Prestwich) – 3:26
6. "Big River" (Johnny Cash) – 2:43
7. "Painted Doll" – 2:34
8. "Saturday Night" – 5:42
9. "You Got Nothing I Want" (Jimmy Barnes) – 3:12
10. "Rising Sun" (Barnes) – 3:26
11. "Flame Trees" (Prestwich, Walker) – 4:38
12. "Bow River" (Ian Moss) – 7:12
13. "Water Into Wine" (Prestwich) – 4:46
14. "F-111" – 3:36
15. "Sunshine" (Paul Richard Hewson) – 5:46
16. "Goodbye (Astrid Goodbye)" (Barnes, Walker) – 4:34
17. "All I Wanna Do (Jimmy Vocal)" (Prestwich) – 3:34

== Charts ==
Chart (2003–2004)	Peak position
Australian Albums (ARIA)	27
Chart (2021)	Peak position
Australian Albums (ARIA)	16

== Certifications ==
Region	Certification	Certified units/sales
Australia (ARIA)	Gold	35,000^{^}
New Zealand (RMNZ)	Gold	7,500^{‡}
^{^} Shipments figures based on certification alone.^{‡} Sales+streaming figures based on certification alone.
