= The Big Five-O Live =

2024 concert tour by Cold Chisel

The Big Five-O
- Tour by Cold Chisel
- Promotional poster for the tour
- Location: Australia; New Zealand
- Associated album: 50 Years – The Best Of
- Start date: October 2024
- End date: January 2025
- Legs: 2
- No. of shows: 27
- Attendance: 250,000+

The Big Five-O was a concert tour by Australia rock group Cold Chisel. The tour celebrated the group's fiftieth anniversary. The 11-date tour was announced in May 2024. Three additional dates were added on 31 May and three more on 3 June 2024. On 12 June, Cold Chisel confirmed all 16 of the 17 dates were sold out and added six more shows, bringing the total to 23 for Australia.

Band member Jimmy Barnes said "The Big Five-0 is a landmark moment, there have been plenty of times where I never thought I'd live to see this day so I'm going to make the most of it. I can't wait to celebrate with my mates and with all the fans who have been such a big part of our story. We're gonna smash it." Don Walker added "This 50th anniversary tour will be a huge celebration – for all of us."

The band performed a secret show as Barking Spiders on 3 October 2024. A total of 24 dates across Australia were completed.

The 23 November 2024 Sidney Myer Music Bowl performance was recorded. Barnes said "Every show on our Big Five-0 Tour had something special, but the Sidney Myer Music Bowl in Melbourne, with 37° temperatures and an incredible audience, really brought out a blistering and joyous performance from all of us onstage. The crowd nearly drowned us out, they sang so loud and proud. It was a show we will never forget."

The performance screened on 7 Network on 11 May 2025. It was the ranked fifth on the night and was viewed by 1,845,000 people.

On 2 July 2025, Cold Chisel confirmed the Sidney Myer Music Bowl performance will be released commercially on 8 August 2025.

== Reception ==
Ben Lewis from TUNE! FM attended the 5 October show and said "Overall, the concert was brilliant [and] they still sound as good as they ever did." Lewis said "It was a marvellous collection of songs that do a great job of representing Cold Chisel as a band."

Michael Bailey from The Sydney Morning Herald reviewed the 11 October show with 4/5 calling the anniversary tour "a remarkable moment".

Sean Bennett from The Rockpit reviewed the show in Perth and said "It was a set that all die-hard Chisel fans would have wanted – the huge timeless hits with some rare cuts littered through the night. 'Four Walls' was exceptional, 'Choir Girl' sublime and the mid-section of 'Cheap Wine', 'Rising Sun', 'My Baby', 'All for You' and 'You've Got Nothing I Want' was fabulous."

Paul Cashmere from Noise11 attended the 25 October show and said "Australia's greatest ever rock band Cold Chisel smashed out two hours of back-to-back hits and deep cuts" and said it "was one of the most perfectly executed events ever produced." Greg Philips from Australian Musician saw the 25 October show and said "The atmosphere and hype under the giant tent was electric … with 10,000 punters of all ages" calling the band "Absolute Aussie Rock legends". Michael Dwyer from The Age also reviewed the 25 October show giving it 5/5, calling the show "emotional".

Pace Proctor from The AU Review attended the 30 October show and gave it 4.5/5 and said, "The performance was a powerhouse, a stacked set of 24 tunes delivered with all the heart and finesse of a band that knows its legacy."

== The Big Five-0 Live ==
The Big Five-0 Live

Live album by Cold Chisel
- Released: 8 August 2025
- Recorded: 23 November 2024
- Venues: Sidney Myer Music Bowl, Melbourne
- Label: Universal Music Australia
- Producer: Kevin Shirley

Cold Chisel chronology
50 Years – The Best Of (2024)	The Big Five-0 Live (2025)

The Big Five-0 Live is a live recording scheduled for release on 8 August 2025 on 2×CD, 3×LP, DVD and Blu-ray. It was recorded on 23 November 2024 at the Sidney Myer Music Bowl, Melbourne.

=== Track listing ===
Disc one

1. "Standing on the Outside"
2. "Letter to Alan"
3. "HQ454 Monroe"
4. "Cheap Wine"
5. "Rising Sun"
6. "My Baby"
7. "All for You"
8. "Painted Doll"
9. "Choirgirl"
10. "Forever Now"
11. "Four Walls"
12. "Houndog"
13. "Rosaline"
14. "You Got Nothing I Want"
15. "Merry-Go-Round"

Disc two

1. "Flame Trees"
2. "Khe Sanh"
3. "Bow River"
4. "Saturday Night"
5. "Breakfast at Sweethearts"
6. "Shipping Steel"
7. "Taipan"
8. "When the War Is Over"
9. "Goodbye (Astrid Goodbye)"
10. "Plaza"*
11. "Mr Crown Prosecutor"*
12. "Wild Colonial Boy"*
- Bonus tracks - recorded on 22 November 2024 at the same venue.

DVD - Interviews

1. Jimmy Barnes Interview
2. Ian Moss Interview
3. Phil Small Interview
4. Don Walker Interview
5. Charley Drayton Interview
6. Tex Perkins Interview
7. Eliza-Jane Barnes Interview
8. Juanita Tippins Interview
9. Bek Hansen Interview
10. Kathy McCabe Interview
11. Sarah Mcleod Interview

=== Charts ===
Weekly chart performance for The Big Five-O Live
Chart (2025)	Peak position
Australian Albums (ARIA)	4

Year-end chart performance for The Big Five-O Live
Chart (2025)	Position
Australian Artist Albums (ARIA)	20

== Tour dates ==
List of concerts
Australian dates (2024)	City	Venue	Opening act
3 October (Note: This was a "secret show", and they performed as Barking Spiders.)	Wollongong, NSW	Anita's Theatre	—N/a
5 October (Note: As part of Red Hot Summer Tour.)	Armidale, NSW	Petersons Winery, Mount View	The Cruel Sea, Birds of Tokyo, The Superjesus and Karen Lee Andrews
8 October	Gold Coast, Queensland	Gold Coast Convention and Exhibition Centre	Karen Lee Andrews
11 October	Sydney, NSW	The Entertainment Quarter	The Cruel Sea and Karen Lee Andrews
12 October	Sydney, NSW	The Entertainment Quarter	The Cruel Sea and Karen Lee Andrews
15 October	Wollongong, NSW	Wollongong Entertainment Centre	Karen Lee Andrews
19 October (Note: As part of Red Hot Summer Tour.)	Perth, WA	Sandalford Wines	Birds of Tokyo, The Cruel Sea, The Superjesus and Karen Lee Andrews
20 October (Note: As part of Red Hot Summer Tour.)	Perth, WA	Sandalford Wines	Birds of Tokyo, The Cruel Sea, The Superjesus and Karen Lee Andrews
25 October	Melbourne, VIC	Flemington Racecourse	The Cruel Sea and Karen Lee Andrews
26 October	Melbourne, VIC	Flemington Racecourse	The Cruel Sea and Karen Lee Andrews
30 October	Brisbane, Queensland	Brisbane Entertainment Centre	Karen Lee Andrews
2 November	Brisbane, Queensland	Victoria Park, Brisbane	The Cruel Sea and Karen Lee Andrews
3 November	Brisbane, Queensland	Victoria Park, Brisbane	The Cruel Sea and Karen Lee Andrews
6 November	Newcastle, NSW	Newcastle Entertainment Centre	Karen Lee Andrews
9 November (Note: As part of Red Hot Summer Tour.)	Ballarat, Victoria	Victoria Park, Ballarat	The Cruel Sea, Birds of Tokyo, The Superjesus and Karen Lee Andrews
10 November (Note: As part of Red Hot Summer Tour.)	Mornington, Victoria	Mornington Racecourse	The Cruel Sea, Birds of Tokyo, The Superjesus and Karen Lee Andrews
13 November	Glenorchy, Tasmania	MyState Bank Arena	Karen Lee Andrews
16 November	Sydney, NSW	QUDOS Arena	The Cruel Sea and Karen Lee Andrews
17 November	Adelaide, South Australia	Adelaide 500	The Cruel Sea and The Superjesus
22 November	Melbourne, Victoria	Sidney Myer Music Bowl	The Cruel Sea and Karen Lee Andrews
23 November	Melbourne, Victoria	Sidney Myer Music Bowl	The Cruel Sea and Karen Lee Andrews
28 November	Canberra, ACT	Patrick White Lawns	The Cruel Sea and Karen Lee Andrews
30 November (Note: As part of Red Hot Summer Tour.)	Hunter Valley, NSW	Roche Estate	The Cruel Sea, Birds of Tokyo, The Superjesus and Karen Lee Andrews
4 December	Sydney, NSW	QUDOS Arena	The Cruel Sea and Karen Lee Andrews
New Zealand dates (2025)	City	Venue	Opening act
18 January	Queenstown	—N/a	Icehouse, Bic Runga and Everclear
25 January	Taupō	—N/a	Icehouse, Bic Runga and Everclear
26 January	Whitianga	—N/a	Icehouse, Bic Runga and Everclear
