= The Live Tapes Vol. 4 =

Live album by Cold Chisel
- Released: 10 November 2017
- Recorded: 17–18 December 2015
- Venues: Sydney Entertainment Centre, New South Wales
- Genre: Pub rock
- Length: 165:00
- Label: Cold Chisel/UMA
- Producer: Kevin Shirley

Cold Chisel chronology
The Live Tapes Vol. 3 (2016)	The Live Tapes Vol. 4 (2017)	Blood Moon (2019)

The Live Tapes Vol. 4, or more fully The Live Tapes Vol 4: The Last Stand of the Sydney Entertainment Centre, December 17 & 18, 2015, is a live album by Australian rock band Cold Chisel. It was recorded at the Sydney Entertainment Centre on 17 and 18 December 2015, which ended the group's One Night Stand tour of Australia. The band dubbed these performances "The Last Stand" of the venue, prior to its demolition. Upon announcement of the two shows, over 20,000 tickets were sold in 10 minutes. The album was launched on the grass of Hobart's Wrest Point Hotel Casino on 22 November. The Live Tapes Vol. 4 was released in various formats on 10 November 2017 as the fourth of a five-part series of live recordings unearthed from Cold Chisel's own archives. It reached No. 9 on the ARIA Albums chart.

== Background ==
Cold Chisel, an Australian pub rock band, undertook their One Night Stand tour upon releasing their eighth studio album, The Perfect Crime (October 2015). The group's line-up was Jimmy Barnes on lead vocals, Charley Drayton on drums and backing vocals, Ian Moss on guitars, backing vocals and lead vocals on two tracks, Phil Small on bass guitar and backing vocals and Don Walker on keyboards, piano and backing vocals. They started the tour at the Deni Ute Muster on 2 October and continued with one night only at various venues across Australia. They had already announced their Last Stand concerts with two nights at soon to be demolished Sydney Entertainment Centre (re-branded as Qantas Credit Union Arena in 2014), which were held on 17 and 18 December 2015. Those concerts were recorded for their live album, The Live Tapes Vol 4: The Last Stand of the Sydney Entertainment Centre, December 17 & 18, 2015, which was issued on 10 November 2017 via Cold Chisel Music/Universal Music Australia. It peaked at No. 9 on the ARIA Albums chart, on the component charts it reached No. 9 on the Top 100 Physical Albums, No. 3 on the Australian Artists Albums and No.15 on the Digital Albums.

Cold Chisel concluded their extensive One Night Stand tour with a trio of performances referred to as "The Last Stand" at the Sydney Entertainment Centre. These unrestrained and deeply emotional shows took place just before the iconic venue's demolition. For Cold Chisel, it held a dual significance, as the "Ent Cent" was where the band had originally held their legendary farewell concerts in December 1983. Following these farewell shows, the band did not perform together again for 15 years.

== Track listing ==
Live Tapes. Vol 4: the 'Last Stand' of Sydney Entertainment Centre: December 17 and 18, 2015 (November 2017) Deluxe Edition: 3×CD + DVD via Cold Chisel Music/Universal Music Australia (CC017L)

CD 1

1. "Standing on the Outside"
2. "Letter to Alan"
3. "Choirgirl"
4. "Rising Sun"
5. "My Baby"
6. "All for You"
7. "Houndog"
8. "Cheap Wine"
9. "Long Dark Road"
10. "Lost"
11. "One Long Day"

CD 2

1. "When the War Is Over"
2. "Forever Now"
3. "Don't Let Go"
4. "Janelle"
5. "Saturday Night"
6. "Breakfast at Sweethearts"
7. "Shipping Steel"
8. "You Got Nothing I Want"
9. "Merry-Go-Round"
10. "Flame Trees"
11. "Khe Sanh"
12. "Bow River"

CD 3

1. "Georgia"
2. "Ita"
3. "The Perfect Crime"
4. "All Hell Broke Lucy"
5. "Four Walls"
6. "Taipan"
7. "Goodbye (Astrid Goodbye)"
8. "HQ454 Monroe"
9. "The Last Wave of Summer"

DVD

1. "Standing on the Outside" – 3:18
2. "Letter to Allan" – 6:12
3. "Choirgirl" – 4:23
4. "Rising Sun" – 3:58
5. "My Baby" – 4:36
6. "All for You" – 4:49
7. "Houndog" – 5:06
8. "Cheap Wine" – 4:28
9. "Long Dark Road" – 4:45
10. "Lost" – 4:48
11. "One Long Day" – 9:39
12. "When the War Is Over" – 5:22
13. "Forever Now" – 5:47
14. "Don't Let Go" – 5:48
15. "Janelle" – 4:11
16. "Saturday Night" – 5:35
17. "Breakfast at Sweethearts" – 4:02
18. "Shipping Steel" – 4:44
19. "You Got Nothing I Want" – 3:14
20. "Merry-Go-Round" – 5:06
21. "Flame Trees" – 4:56
22. "Khe Sanh" – 5:04
23. "Bow River" – 7:31
24. "Georgia" – 7:31
25. "Ita" – 3:57
26. "The Perfect Crime" – 2:57
27. "All Hell Broke Lucy" – 4:57
28. "Four Walls" – 2:56
29. "Taipan" – 5:18
30. "Goodbye (Astrid Goodbye)" – 4:48
31. "HQ4S4 Monroe" – 3:30
32. "The Last Wave of Summer" – 7:52
33. "Credits" – 1:19
34. "Audience Voxpops"

== Charts ==
Chart (2017)	Peak position
Australian Albums (ARIA)	9

== Release history ==
Region	Date	Format	Edition(s)	Label	Catalogue
Australia	10 November 2017	3×CD; DD	Standard	Cold Chisel Music/Universal Music Australia	CC017
Australia	10 November 2017	3×CD + DVD	Deluxe edition	Cold Chisel Music/Universal Music Australia	CC017L
Australia	10 November 2017	4×vinyl	Vinyl edition	Cold Chisel Music/Universal Music Australia	CC017LP/602557945799
