= Northbound =

Greatest hits album by Cold Chisel
- Released: 1983
- Recorded: 1978–1983
- Genre: Blues rock; garage rock; hard rock
- Label: Line
- Producer: Mark Opitz; Peter Walker; Richard Batchens; Keith Walker

Cold Chisel chronology
Circus Animals (1982)	Northbound (1983)	Twentieth Century (1984)

Professional ratings
Review scores
Source	Rating
AllMusic	4.5/5 stars

Northbound is the first greatest hits collection by Australian pub rock band Cold Chisel, released in Germany in 1983. It included tracks from their first three studio albums, Cold Chisel, Breakfast at Sweethearts and East.

The included mix of "Dresden" features a slightly different vocal to the familiar Breakfast at Sweethearts mix.

== Track listing ==
All songs written by Don Walker, except where noted.

Side one

1. "Cheap Wine" – 3:21
2. "Choirgirl" – 3:12
3. "Khe Sanh" – 4:08
4. "Shipping Steel" – 3:22
5. "Breakfast at Sweethearts" – 4:06
6. "Home and Broken Hearted" – 3:23

Side two

1. "My Baby" (Phil Small) – 3:57
2. "Star Hotel" – 4:03
3. "Northbound" – 3:12
4. "Standing on the Outside" – 2:49
5. "Dresden" – 3:52
6. "Party's Over" – 2:58
