= The Barking Spiders Live: 1983 =

Live album by Cold Chisel
- Released: December 1984
- Recorded: 25 October & 12–15 December 1983
- Genre: Rock
- Label: WEA
- Producer: Mark Opitz

Cold Chisel chronology
Twentieth Century (1984)	The Barking Spiders Live: 1983 (1984)	Radio Songs: A Best of Cold Chisel (1985)

The Barking Spiders Live: 1983 is a live album by Australian rock band Cold Chisel. It was recorded during the final performances of their Last Stand tour in 1983, at the Sydney Entertainment Centre. The name of the album derives from a name the band used occasionally when playing warm-up shows before tours. Don Walker states a "barking spider" is "Scottish slang for a fart."

The album peaked at number 14 on the Australian Kent Music Report.

== Cover ==
The cover art was deliberately less elaborate than many of the albums of the time. Philip Mortlock said, "I used a Dylan bootleg as the primary influence. To satisfy the sales team we stickered the album to identify it as a Cold Chisel live album. By this stage the band were long gone, so we didn't have a touring artist to promote nor were any members of the band willing or available to do PR."

== Reception ==
Reviewed in The Canberra Times at the time of release, the album was described as, "a great reminder of the band's power and talent, particularly in concert, and a crucial purchase for all Chisel fans".

Rip It Up said, "Many of the songs included here are distinct improvements on the studio versions, particularly "Taipan" and "Bow River", which have grown in stature and are complemented by some excellent harmonica courtesy of David Blight. Don't be deterred by the old school bootleg packaging".

== Track listing ==
All tracks by Don Walker except where indicated

Side one

1. "Merry-Go-Round"
2. "You Got Nothing I Want" (Jimmy Barnes)
3. "No Sense" (Barnes)
4. "Hold Me Tight"
5. "Tomorrow"
6. "Forever Now" (Steve Prestwich)

Side two

1. "Standing on the Outside"
2. "Bow River" (Ian Moss)
3. "It's Only Make Believe" (Jack Nance, Conway Twitty)
4. "Twentieth Century"
5. "Taipan"
6. "Georgia" (Stuart Gorrell, Hoagy Carmichael)

== Charts ==
=== Weekly charts ===
Chart (1984/85)	Peak position
Australia (Kent Music Report)	14

== Personnel ==
- Jim Barnes - vocals, guitar
- Ian Moss - guitar, lead vocals tracks 8 and 12
- Don Walker - organ, piano
- Phil Small - bass
- Steve Prestwich - drums
- Dave Blight - harmonica
