= Rockpalast (film) =

Rockpalast: Cold Chisel
- Directed by: Christian Wagner
- Produced by: Peter Ruechel
- Starring: Jim Barnes (vocals, guitar); Ian Moss (vocals, guitar); Don Walker (organ, piano); Phil Small (bass), Steve Prestwich (drums)
- Cinematography: Rudolf Neid
- Music by: Cold Chisel
- Distributed by: Warner Music Group (DVD)
- Release dates: 3 December 1982 (TV); 26 May 2007 (DVD)
- Running time: 115 minutes
- Countries: Germany (original TV screening), Australia (DVD release)
- Languages: German (introductions), English (lyrics)

Rockpalast: Cold Chisel was a live-to-air television screening of a rock concert performance by Australian pub rock band, Cold Chisel, at Markthalle in Hamburg, Germany on 3 December 1982. It was filmed as an episode of WDR's long-standing live concert television show Rockpalast.

A DVD of the live concert screening, titled Cold Chisel: Rockpalast, was released on 26 May 2007 by Warner in Australia.

== Track listing ==
1. Merry Go Round
2. Khe Sanh
3. Wild Colonial Boy
4. Taipan
5. Bow River
6. One Long Day
7. You Got Nothing I Want
8. My Turn to Cry
9. Forever Now
10. Letter to Alan
11. Houndog
12. Four Walls
13. Standing on the Outside
14. Don't Let Go
15. Star Hotel
16. Goodbye (Astrid Goodbye)
17. Cheap Wine
  1st encore
18. Wild Thing
19. The Party's Over
20. Rising Sun
21. Conversations
  2nd encore
22. When Something Is Wrong with My Baby
23. Breakfast at Sweethearts
24. I'm Gonna Roll Ya
