= The Live Tapes Vol. 3 =

Live album by Cold Chisel
- Released: 2 December 2016
- Recorded: 7 June 1980
- Studio: The Manly Vale Hotel, Sydney
- Genre: Pub rock
- Label: Cold Chisel Music

Cold Chisel chronology
The Perfect Crime (2015)	The Live Tapes Vol. 3 (2016)	The Live Tapes Vol. 4 (2017)

The Live Tapes Vol. 3 is a live album by Australian rock band Cold Chisel. The album was recorded at The Manly Vale Hotel in Sydney on 7 June 1980, the same week the band's third studio album, East was released.

The Live Tapes Vol. 3 released on 2 December 2016 as the third in an ongoing series of special live recordings unearthed from Cold Chisel's own archives.

Cold Chisel's lead singer Jimmy Barnes said: "In 1980, we were playing 8 days a week. We were fighting fit and hungry, playing every show like it was our last – and often it almost was... We were still playing pubs, with the audience spilling onto the stage and the band spilling into the audience. It was fierce and fiery and lots of fun. Everyone in the band was writing songs and playing at the top of their game. It's all here in this raw and real recording."

== Critical reception ==
Steve Bell from The Music AU gave the album 4 out of 5 saying; "This new live release returns us to a sweaty Sydney pub in mid-1980. We're privy to early airings of "Cheap Wine", "Standing On The Outside", "Choirgirl", "My Baby" and more as well as choice cuts from their early reservoir of timeless classics. The band's tough and uncompromising, and the sound pristine; documenting a band at the top of the pile during a time when being able to kill it live counted for everything. "

Triple M called the album "simply incredible" adding "it's an intimate snapshot of a band in full-flight, doing what they do best."

Rhythms Magazine said the album, "reveals a fierce, lean band; whip-smart and confident from 5 years of relentless touring but who were still hungry and risk-taking."

== Track listing ==
CD1

1. "Standing on the Outside"
2. "Home and Broken Hearted"
3. "Juliet"
4. "Shakin' All Over"
5. "Choirgirl"
6. "Conversations"
7. "Never Before"
8. "My Turn to Cry"
9. "Best Kept Lies"
10. "Shipping Steel"
11. "My Baby"

CD2

1. "Rising Sun"
2. "Breakfast at Sweethearts"
3. "One Long Day"
4. "Cheap Wine"
5. "Khe Sanh"
6. "Star Hotel"
7. "Merry-Go-Round"
8. "Knockin' On Heaven's Door"
9. "Tomorrow"
10. "Goodbye (Astrid Goodbye)"

DVD

1. "Cheap Wine"
2. "Rising Sun"
3. "Best Kept Lies"
4. "Shipping Steel"
5. "Choirgirl"
6. "Star Hotel"
7. "Merry-Go-Round"
8. "Knockin' On Heaven's Door"
9. "Goodbye (Astrid, Goodbye)"
10. "My Turn to Cry"

== Charts ==
Chart (2016)	Peak position
Australian Albums (ARIA)	11

== Release history ==
Region	Date	Format	Edition(s)	Label	Catalogue
Australia	2 December 2016	CD+DVD; vinyl; DD	Standard / Deluxe	Cold Chisel Music / Universal Music Australia	CC016L
