= Ringside =

Ringside may refer to:

== Sports ==
- Ringside of a boxing ring
- Ringside of a wrestling ring
- Ringside seating (combat sports), see Ringside (boxing)

== Film ==
- Ringside Maisie, 1941 boxing film
- Ringside (1949 film), American boxing drama film
- Ringside (1992 film), a Finnish documentary
- Ringside (2016 film), TV One boxing drama with Tyler Lepley and Julissa Bermudez
- Ringside, 1960 Swedish boxing documentary with Bengt Feldreich

== Television ==
- Ringside (2005 TV series), with Brian Kenny (sportscaster)
- Ringside (ESPN TV series), weekly boxing series on ESPN Classic
- Ringside, on Solar Sports from List of Philippine television shows
- Sky Ringside, the "Ringside" Australian pay-per-view channel by Sky

== Music ==
- Ringside (band), indie rock band from Hollywood, California
  - Ringside (Ringside album), 2005
- Ringside (Cold Chisel album), 2003
  - Ringside - Cold Chisel the Movie, 2003 DVD by Cold Chisel
- Ringside, 1997 album by Ron Affif
- Ringside, mixtape from Smoke DZA discography
- Ringside - Live at Lorensbergsteatern, Göteborg, video album by Jerry Williams (singer) 2008
- Boxer's Ringside, defunct gay bar and music venue in North Carolina

== Other ==
- Ringside, collection of boxing stories by Budd Schulberg
- RingSide Steakhouse, restaurant in Portland
- Ringside, a minigame in the video game Rhythm Heaven Fever

== See also ==
- Ringside seat (disambiguation)
