= The Live Tapes Vol. 2 =

Live album by Cold Chisel
- Released: 14 November 2014
- Recorded: Bombay Rock. 27 April 1979
- Genre: Pub rock
- Label: Cold Chisel Music

Cold Chisel chronology
The Live Tapes Vol. 1 (2013)	The Live Tapes Vol. 2 (2014)	The Perfect Crime (2015)

The Live Tapes Vol. 2 is a live album by Australian rock band Cold Chisel. The album was recorded in Melbourne's Bombay Rock on 27 April 1979 and released on 14 November 2014. The album peaked at number 19 in Australia.

This recording was broadcast live-to-air on AM radio stations around Australia and recorded just two months after the release of the band's revered second album Breakfast at Sweethearts. The Live Tapes Vol. 2 features all but one of that album's songs.

== Reviews ==
Bill Johnston of News Corp gave the album 4 out of 5 saying; "The sound is of a road-hardened young band playing intensely which will remind older fans of the group’s formative years while providing an entry for newer fans beyond the radio staples."

== Track listing ==
1. "Shipping Steel" – 3:21
2. "Home and Broken Hearted" – 3:21
3. "Dresden" – 4:25
4. "Conversations" – 3:54
5. "Showtime" – 3:39
6. "The Door" – 4:59
7. "Breakfast at Sweethearts" – 4:14
8. "Plaza" – 3:50
9. "One Long Day" – 9:15
10. "Merry-Go-Round" – 3:54
11. "Wild Thing" – 7:19
12. "Goodbye (Astrid Goodbye)" – 3:54

== Charts ==
Chart (2014)	Peak position
Australian Albums (ARIA)	19

== Release history ==
Region	Date	Format	Edition(s)	Label	Catalogue
Australia	11 November 2014	CD; digital download	Standard	Cold Chisel Music / Universal Music Australia	CC013
Australia	15 April 2016	Vinyl	Standard	Universal Music Australia	CC013
