= Misfits (Cold Chisel song) =

Single by Cold Chisel

from the album Chisel
- A-side: "Misfits"
- B-side: "Mona and the Preacher" "Four Walls (live)"
- Released: 1991
- Recorded: 1980
- Genre: Rock
- Label: WEA
- Songwriter: Don Walker
- Producer: Mark Opitz

Cold Chisel singles chronology
"Flame Trees" (1984)	"Misfits" (1991)	"Hands Out of My Pocket" (1994)

"Misfits" was a 1991 single from Australian rock band Cold Chisel, issued to promote the compilation album Chisel. The single only reached number 61 in the national charts and was later dropped from subsequent Chisel re-issue packages. The song was written by organist Don Walker and was recorded during the sessions for the 1980 album East. "Misfits" was originally used as the B-side for that album's third single "My Baby".

The song was intended for a Health Commission documentary on homeless youth that was never released, due to the film being too "tough". The producer, Pam Scott, had approached the band to write a song about homeless teenagers in Sydney's Western Suburbs. The promotional video has footage of street kids and the band performing in a studio, shot by Peter Levy, who would later do the cover for "Circus Animals".

== Reception ==
Andrew McMillan wrote in RAM, that Barnes, "was - as the medium of lyrical communication - voicing a strong identification with the underdog at a time when the species was gathering numbers, losing hope, and bearing its teeth."

== Charts ==
Chart (1991)	Peak position
Australia (ARIA Charts)	55
