= Guelfenbein =

Guelfenbein is a surname. Notable people with the surname include:

- Carla Guelfenbein (born 1959), Chilean writer
- Eduardo Guelfenbein (born 1953), Chilean painter
