= Bruce Elder (journalist) =

Australian journalist, writer and commentator

Bruce Elder is an Australian journalist, writer and commentator.

== Career ==
Elder contributed to the short-lived music publication Ear for Music in 1973. He later credited Anthony O'Grady, the magazine's editor, as giving him his first break as a professional journalist.

He was a full-time journalist with The Sydney Morning Herald and The Age from 1996 to 2012, specialising in travel and popular culture. His other areas of expertise include film, television, and popular music. He was also the director of Walkabout, the Fairfax organisation's detailed travel internet site. He has written extensively around Australia and has a passion for Australian history.

Elder's radio experience began in the 1970s when he became ABC's 2JJ (now Triple J) London Correspondent. He was heard across Australia on Friday nights on Tony Delroy's Nightlife program. Elder is the Australasian editor of Australian Trivial Pursuit. He has also written over 60 books for 16 publishers including contributions to the Macquarie Dictionary, atlases, communication text books and travel guides. His 2003 book, Remember When: Reflections on a Changing Australia, looked at the way Australia has changed over the past 50 years.

In 1982, Elder wrote the book adaptation of the award-winning ABC documentary on death and dying, And When I Die, Will I Be Dead?

In 1988 Elder won acclaim for his book Blood on the Wattle, which collects in one place all reports of massacres of Aboriginal Australians. Three editions have been published. This book was praised as 'arguably the best book ever written about Aboriginal Australians by a white writer. It was listed as one of the ten most influential Australian works of non-fiction in the twentieth century in an extensive poll conducted by The Sydney Morning Herald and The Age.

In 1996 Elder won the prestigious Pascall Prize for Critical Writing. This was the first time the award had been won by a writer working in the field of popular culture.

In 2010 he was appointed chairman of the board of Lifeline South Coast (he had been a member of the board for over a decade) and, for ten years, has been an Australia Day Ambassador (including in Gosford, NSW in year 2010) travelling around New South Wales and performing civic duties for the Australia Day Council. He has been an Ambassador to Kogarah, Tumut, Marulan, Crookwell, Junee, Ardlethan, Taralga, Wyong, Adelong, Harden, Wombat, The Entrance and Toukley, Woy Woy and Gosford.

Elder publishes the Aussie Towns online guide to the history and attractions of towns around Australia. In September 2019, it was reported that he had covered "1,333 towns [with] about 150 towns still to write".
