= The Tyson Zone =

Phrase

The Tyson Zone is a phrase coined by sports writer Bill Simmons (although the idea came from one of his readers), to describe the point at which a celebrity's behavior becomes so unpredictable, that there is nothing they could do that would shock or surprise the general public. The phrase is nicknamed after boxer Mike Tyson due to his bizarre public antics, both inside and outside of the ring.

== History ==
The phrase originated in a 2004 ESPN mailbag blog by Bill Simmons with an email from a reader named Brendan from Philadelphia asking "I think Ron Artest has entered rarified air now. He's officially a person who, if a friend said, "Did you hear that (fill in celebrity's name) just (fill in the insane behavior: urinated on a police officer, began breeding unicorns, etc.)?", I would have no problem believing it was true. I think this space is occupied by Mike Tyson, Michael Jackson, Courtney Love, and the late, great ODB. Can you think of any others?" In his response to this question, Simmons would dub this theory the "Tyson Zone" after Mike Tyson.

== Examples ==
Many different individuals and even a sports team have been cited as being in the Tyson Zone. A selection of those described as being in the Tyson Zone are listed below.

- Ron Artest
- The Cleveland Browns football team
- Gary Busey
- Tom Cruise
- Flavor Flav
- Michael Jackson
- Courtney Love
- Dennis Rodman
- Rip Torn
- Donald Trump
- Mike Tyson
- Kanye West
- Aaron Rodgers
