= Blood Moon (Cold Chisel album) =

Studio album by Cold Chisel
- Released: 6 December 2019
- Recorded: 2019
- Studio: Sydney
- Genre: Rock
- Length: 40:26
- Label: Cold Chisel Music
- Producer: Kevin Shirley

Cold Chisel chronology
The Live Tapes Vol. 4 (2017)	Blood Moon (2019)	The Live Tapes Vol. 5 (2020)

Singles from Blood Moon
- 1. "Getting the Band Back Together" Released: 31 October 2019; 2. "I Hit the Wall" Released: 21 November 2019; 3. "Killing Time" Released: 5 February 2020

Blood Moon is the ninth studio album by Australian rock band Cold Chisel. It was released on 6 December 2019, and is supported by the lead single "Getting the Band Back Together". It is the band's first studio album since 2015's The Perfect Crime. The band toured in support of the album from 31 December 2019 until February 2020. The album debuted atop the ARIA Albums Chart, becoming the band's fifth album to reach the summit and first since The Last Wave of Summer in 1998.

== Background and recording ==
The band demoed 25 songs at Jimmy Barnes' Freight Train Studios, recording the album in Sydney in the months before the album's release with producer Kevin Shirley. Barnes declared it, "our best set of songs since the 80s".

The first single, "Getting the Band Back Together", has Moss and Barnes sharing the lead vocals, and the whole band chanting the chorus. Don Walker said, "It probably would sound better if a few of us weren't there at the mic, but it's more fun. There's a range of singing skills across the band, from 'sublime' to 'groan'. But if you get everybody together singing the chorus, then it sounds like, well, a bunch of humans."

"I Hit the Wall", with its chorus of, "I hit the wall and the wall won", sees Walker sharing a songwriting credit with Sonny Curtis, author of "I Fought the Law".

Blood Moon was the first album to feature songs with lyrics by Barnes and music from Walker, with 5 of the songs written this way. Barnes said, "In the past, when we'd write I’ve written music and Don's written lyrics. It’s only in the last two years that the process has turned around. I think particularly since writing the two autobiographies I've found my voice as a writer and I think I've had the confidence to write and then to say 'Hey Don, I’ve sent you some lyrics.'"

Some of the songs had been previously demoed by Walker. He said, "In between our demoing and the recording, a friend of mine was reading Songs and he asked me about a handful of songs that had never been recorded or released, but were included in the book. They were songs I’d written many years before but hadn’t thought to submit. Through being reawakened to them, I tossed them in the ring and both of them stuck." "Accident Prone" had been recorded as far back as Unlimited Address in 1988.

== Reception ==
The Australian wrote the album is "all about reliving past glories", calling it "all killer, no filler. The keynote throughout is consistency: Moss's blazing, inventive solos, Phil Small's melodic, muscular bass, Walker's bedrock keys and Drayton's solid yet supple drumming. Barnes's vocal exchanges with Moss are a feature, as are his lyrics."

The Sydney Morning Herald noted, "There's a lot of love around the Cold Chisel camp just now, internally and among fans. "Killing Time" and "Boundary Street" hark back to the Chisel of yore with all their grit, heart and finesse on show." The Music agreed, opining that "there are some genuine kicks to be had amid the been-there-done-that pub-rock jams; the strongest track, "Boundary Street", contains a downright filthy solo sax by Andy Bickers, who drags Ian Moss’ guitar down into the muck with him."

The Daily Examiner called it, "a potpourri of ideas, sounds and genres, from the chooglin' boogie of the first single, the high speed oblivion of "Drive", to Ian Moss' soulful closer "You are so Beautiful"". X-Press Mag said, "While Chisel don’t throw too many stylistic curveballs on Blood Moon, what is surprising is just how polished they sound", but also noted that some of Barnes' lyrics "leave the listener cringing".

== Track listing ==
No.	Title	Writer(s)	Length
1.	"Getting the Band Back Together"	Don Walker	4:00
2.	"Land of Hope"	Jimmy Barnes, Don Walker	4:05
3.	"Drive"	Jimmy Barnes, Don Walker	3:29
4.	"Killing Time"	Jimmy Barnes, Don Walker	3:52
5.	"I Hit the Wall"	Don Walker, Sonny Curtis	3:45
6.	"Boundary Street"	Don Walker	4:55
7.	"Buried Treasure"	Charley Drayton, Don Walker	5:00
8.	"Accident Prone"	Don Walker	4:06
9.	"Someday"	Jimmy Barnes, Don Walker	4:22
10.	"You Are So Beautiful"	Ian Moss, Lucy Desoto	2:52
Total length:			40:26

== Charts ==
=== Weekly charts ===
Chart (2019)	Peak position
Australian Albums (ARIA)	1

=== Year-end charts ===
Chart (2019)	Position
Australian Albums (ARIA)	97

== Release history ==
Region	Date	Format	Edition(s)	Label	Catalogue
Various	6 December 2019	CD; digital download; streaming	Standard	Cold Chisel Music; Universal Music Australia	CC018
Australia	6 December 2019	CD + DVD; cassette	Limited	Cold Chisel Music; Universal Music Australia	CC018L/CC018C
Australia	20 January 2020	Vinyl	Standard	Cold Chisel Music; Universal Music Australia	CC018LP

== See also ==
- List of number-one albums of 2019 (Australia)
