= Ringside seat =

Ringside seat may refer to:

- ringside seating (combat sports), see ringside (boxing)
- Ringside Seat, a 1983 videogame
- A Ringside Seat, a 2000 book by Michael Brunson
- "Ringside Seat", a 2015 TV episode of The First 48; see List of The First 48 episodes
- Ringside Seat, a newsletter established by Count Grog

== See also ==
- Ringside (disambiguation)
- Seat (disambiguation)
