= Anthony O'Grady =

Australian writer, music journalist, editor and producer

- Born: Anthony Austin O'Grady; 28 January 1947
- Died: 19 December 2018 (aged 71); Sydney, New South Wales, Australia
- Resting place: Macquarie Park Cemetery and Crematorium, North Ryde, New South Wales, Australia
- Education: University of Sydney
- Occupations: Writer; journalist; producer
- Children: 2
- Writing career
- Genre: Music
- Notable work: Rock Australia Magazine (RAM)

Anthony Austin O'Grady (28 January 1947 – 19 December 2018) was an Australian writer, music journalist, editor and producer. He created and edited Rock Australia Magazine from 1975 to 1981. He wrote articles for The Bulletin. In 1994 O'Grady co-created the Music Network. For 15 years he was an oral history interviewer for National Film and Sound Archive (NFSA). O'Grady authored the 2001 biography Cold Chisel: The Pure Stuff detailing the Australian band Cold Chisel.

== Biography ==
Anthony Austin O'Grady was born on 28 January 1947 and was raised in Sydney, New South Wales with two siblings. He attended Saint Ignatius' College, Riverview and graduated with honours in English Literature; he entered University of Sydney studying Arts Law. He wrote for the student paper, Honi Soit. After leaving university he began a career as an advertising copywriter for Lintas Advertising Agency, which he recalled as "then a hotbed of creativity".

O'Grady entered music journalism as a contributor to Go-Set and then became editor of the short-lived magazine Ear for Music in 1973. Inspired by seeing Skyhooks perform at the 1975 Sunbury Pop Festival, he established Rock Australia Magazine (RAM), with English-born publisher Phillip Mason in March 1975. In RAM's early years, besides editing, O'Grady wrote much of its content – under various pseudonyms – covering both local and international artists. At the Australian Rock Music Awards in 1977, he was nominated for Best Rock Journalist. Through his articles, he championed the early careers of Skyhooks, Jeff St John, Wendy Saddington, Chain, the Angels, Cold Chisel, Midnight Oil and Radio Birdman. As editor he fostered the careers of fellow writers Glenn A. Baker, Jen Jewel Brown, Stuart Coupe, Andrew McMillan and Clinton Walker.

O'Grady left RAM at the end of 1981. He said he was dissatisfied with how the magazine's profits were being invested in "starting up new, invariably unsuccessful publications" rather than improving RAM's "investigative journalism and in-depth profiling". He then wrote freelance articles for The Bulletin and other periodicals. In 1984 he curated the music soundtrack for the feature film Street Hero. He created an inhouse monthly magazine, Music, for retailer Brashs, which included articles on contemporary rock, world music, folk, ambient and rap. O'Grady co-created The Music Network in 1994 with talent manager John Woodruff and ex-Icehouse bass guitarist Keith Welsh. According to O'Grady, it was "a tip sheet ... to highlight records that are starting to work at radio and/or retail" before they appeared on the Australian Music Report or ARIA Charts. He remained as its editor for several years before relocating to regional New South Wales.

O'Grady produced radio specials on various Australian artists. He returned to Sydney and resumed music writing in 1998, after Cold Chisel re-formed. He wrote that group's biography Cold Chisel: The Pure Stuff (2001). In 2005 O'Grady wrote and produced a five-part radio documentary on the 1970s music scene. He provided in-depth interviews, with Australian rock musicians, for the oral history at the National Film and Sound Archive (NFSA) and continued writing for newspapers including The Sydney Morning Herald into the 2010s. He wrote numerous music-related obituaries, including Andrew McMillan (February 2012), Clive Shakespeare (February 2012), Vince Lovegrove (March 2012), Jimmy Little (April 2012), Mick Hadley (November 2012), Chris Bailey (April 2013), Chrissy Amphlett (April 2013), and Dave Swarbrick (June 2016).

== Personal life ==
Anthony O'Grady married Linda Campbell, a social worker, in 1987 and the couple had two children before divorcing in the 1990s. In the 2000s his health deteriorated and he was placed on kidney dialysis until he had a kidney transplant in 2008. He subsequently developed melanomas. Anthony O'Grady died in 2018, aged 71.

== Bibliography ==
- O'Grady, Anthony (2001), Cold Chisel: the Pure Stuff, Allen & Unwin, ISBN 978-1-86508-196-0
- O'Grady, Anthony; Radio Birdman; WEA Records (1982), Soldiers of Rock 'n' Roll: an Audio Documentary of Radio Birdman, WEA Records
