= Marble Bar, Sydney =

Bar in Sydney, Australia

Marble Bar
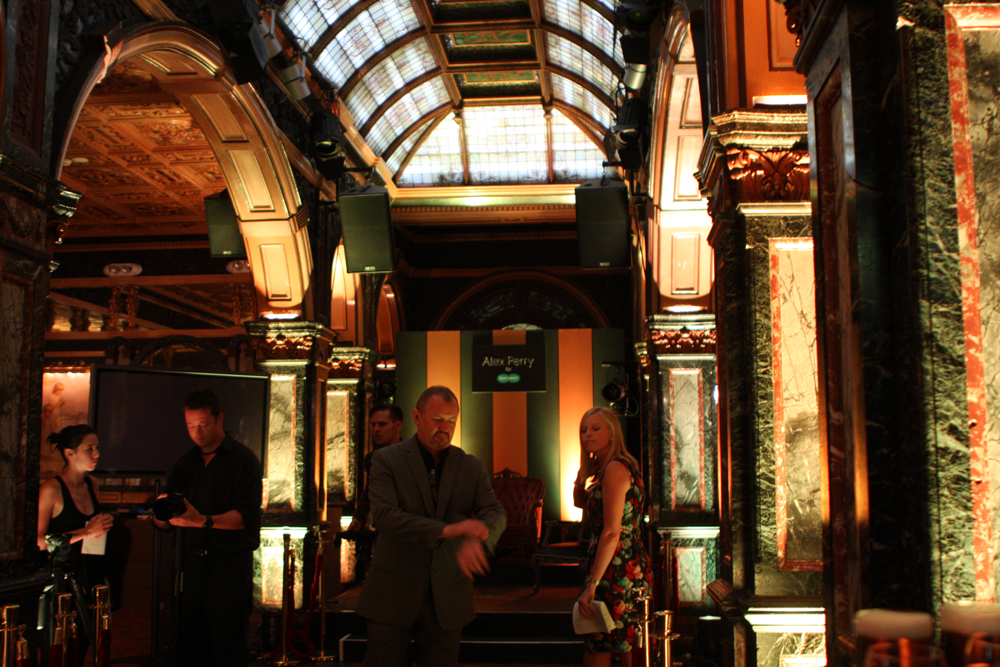
- The bar in 2012
- Interactive map of the Marble Bar area

General information
- Type: Bar
- Location: 488 George Street, Sydney, New South Wales, Australia
- Coordinates: 33.8716299°S 151.207888°E
- Completed: 1893 (133 years ago)

Design and construction
- Architect: Varney Parkes

Website
- https://www.marblebarsydney.com.au/

Marble Bar is an historic bar in Sydney, Australia. Originally constructed in the George Adams-owned O'Brien Hotel in 1893, it was dismantled in 1969, then moved and rebuilt in the subterranean level of the Hilton Sydney, on George Street, in 1973. It is now a heritage-listed building.

The bar was designed by Varney Parkes. Its features include plate-glass mirrors, mosaic floors, cedar timbers, a domed roof, stained-glass windows and marble walls and pilasters. Fourteen paintings by Julian Ashton are hung throughout. The only differences to the original bar is the lack of natural light, and the location of the paintings is different.

== Popular culture ==
The bar appears on the front cover of Cold Chisel's 1979 album Breakfast at Sweethearts.
