= Razor Songs =

Radio Songs

Compilation album by Cold Chisel
- Released: 1987
- Recorded: 1978–1984
- Genre: Hard rock
- Label: WEA
- Producer: Cold Chisel, Mark Opitz, Dave Walsh

Cold Chisel chronology
| Radio Songs: A Best of Cold Chisel (1985) | Radio Songs (1987) | Chisel (1991) |

Razor Songs is a retrospective compilation album of non-singles tracks by Australian pub rock band Cold Chisel, released in 1987. The album was certified platinum in Australia in 1997.

== Track listing ==
- all tracks written by Don Walker, unless otherwise stated.
- A1 "Home and Broken Hearted" - 3:26
- A2 "Standing on the Outside" - 2:53
- A3 "Conversations" - 4:51
- A4 "Hold Me Tight" - 1:42
- A5 "Ghost Town" - 1:20
- A6 "My Turn to Cry" (Jimmy Barnes) - 3:18
- B1 "Houndog" - 4:54
- B2 "Painted Doll" - 2:19
- B3 "Rising Sun" (Jimmy Barnes) - 3:24
- B4 "Merry Go Round" - 3:45
- B5 "Wild Thing" (Chip Taylor) - 5:00

== Charts ==
| Chart (1987–88) | Peak position |
|---|---|
| Australia (Kent Music Report) | 11 |

== Certifications ==
| Region | Certification | Certified units/sales |
|---|---|---|
| Australia (ARIA) | Platinum | 70,000^{^} |
^{^} Shipments figures based on certification alone.
