= Ear for Music =

1973 Australian music magazine

- Editor: Anthony O'Grady
- Categories: Music
- Frequency: Monthly
- First issue: September 1973
- Final issue: December 1973
- Company: Modern Magazines (Holdings) Ltd
- Country: Australia
- Based in: Sydney
- Language: English
- ISSN: 0310-8171

Ear for Music was a short-lived Australian music magazine that operated for three issues in 1973. It was published by Modern Magazines and owned by Kim Ryrie. Anthony O'Grady was the magazine's editor.

Having written for Go-Set, O'Grady was asked by Ryrie to be editor of a new music title. The publication was among the first Australian magazines devoted to music. In his introduction to the inaugural issue, dated September 1973, O'Grady wrote that the magazine's writers were the "best ever lined up for a music magazine in Australia" and included "performers, musicologists, critics, [and] experts in audio equipment". The second issue was published on 17 October, although dated November.

Ear for Music's staff included Michael Delaney in the role of music consultant. Among its writers was Bruce Elder, who credited O'Grady with giving him his first break as a professional journalist. British music critic Nik Cohn also wrote for the magazine, contributing an article on the Who in the November 1973 issue.

Ear for Music published its own album charts, divided into listings of Top Group {Popular}, Top Group (Hard Rock), Top Male Artist (Popular), Top Male Artist (Hard Rock), Top Female Vocal, and Soundtrack and Comedy. According to the magazine, the charts were compiled from information received from record companies and checked against sales figures from leading record stores throughout Australia.
