= Swingshift =

Live album by Cold Chisel
- Released: 23 March 1981
- Genre: Pub rock
- Length: 91:06 (2011 remaster)
- Label: WEA
- Producer: Mark Opitz

Cold Chisel chronology
East (1980)	Swingshift (1981)	Circus Animals (1982)

Swingshift is a live album released by Australian band Cold Chisel in 1981. It was their first album to reach No. 1 on the Australian chart, debuting there in its first week. It peaked at number 9 in New Zealand. A press release said the title referred to, "the midnight to dawn shift that the staff in asylums dread: the hours when the crazies go crazy."

== Details ==
The performances on Swingshift were taken from concerts at Sydney's Capitol Theatre and Melbourne's Palais Theatre from the "Youth in Asia" tour in the winter of 1980. Don Walker said compared to the studio versions of the songs, "Generally the feel's a lot better, and the band plays a lot better." The songs are as recorded live, but studio remixing took 125 hours.

Barnes said, "Most of the album was recorded at Sydney's Capitol Theatre on the last night of our Youth In Asia tour. It was a really hot night. Everything just happened, you know? Everyone fired." The opening acts for this night were Mental as Anything and INXS. Guest musicians were saxophonist Billy Rogers (a one-time member of Dragon) and David Blight on harmonica, who is introduced by Barnes saying, "David Blight nearly cut his hand off the other day but he thought he'd come up and play anyway."

"I remember the show very well," Don Walker said. "It was pretty much the highlight of that tour. By the time we did that show, we'd played the East album all over the country and this was bringing everything home. Our chance to play all the East songs live to our home crowd."

Producer Mark Opitz said of the recording process, "I just turned up at gigs with recording equipment. Half the band didn’t know I was gonna do it. I didn’t want them to know too early because I didn’t wanna get them gun-shy."

There are covers of "Knocking on Heaven's Door", Creedence Clear Water Revival's "Long as I Can See the Light", and Jesse Stone's "Don't Let Go" on the album. Barnes introduces the latter song by saying he prefers the version done by Jerry Lee.

The picture on the cover of the album is taken from a still of a video recording from when the band played the Manly Vale in April 1980. The cover was almost entirely created by Phillip Mortlock.

Cold Chisel re-released their catalogue in 2011, with Swingshift re-entering the Australian charts for one week at number 42. This new remaster contains four additional tracks.

== Reception ==
Adrian Zupp at AllMusic gave the album a score of four and a half out of five, noting, "The band was at the peak of its powers and launching from all silos, and it shows." He noted there are many highlights, including, "the band's signature number "Khe Sanh," the dark and frantic "Conversations," the beefed-up rockabilly of "Rising Sun," and the rock & roll meteor "Goodbye (Astrid Goodbye)." He went on to praise the performances of support players Billy Rodgers and David Blight, but questioned the inclusion of the cover of "Knocking on Heaven's Door". New Zealand music magazine Rip It Up, however, praised the cover and added, "listen to Jesse Stone's "Don't Let Go" which has been butchered by everybody from Manhattan Transfer to Isaac Hayes. Stand to be reconverted."

Upon release, the album was also highly praised in RAM, one of the leading Australian music magazines of the time. Reviewer Greg Taylor said, "The result is four sides of high rock and roll, brilliantly played, well recorded, and definitely worth taking home - especially if you're finding Chisel gigs a bit crowded for comfort these days." However, he does note, "The very fact that a live gig demands more up rockers than anything else precludes Swingshift from being a Very Best of Cold Chisel."

Critic Toby Creswell said of Swingshift, "the amazing thing was the way they fitted together. Jimmy and Mossy deliver spade loads of emotion. As much as Jimmy has been criticised for screaming, if you listen to that record what he's doing vocally is really amazing." Roadrunner said, "Fan-bloody-tastic. That's about the best way I can sum up my reaction to this magnum opus. There's no fuss, no frills, just the hottest live band in the country (the world?) captured in all their naked glory."

In The Sydney Morning Herald, the album was described as, "Hard music carrying politically aware lyrics, forced home with hammer-like backgrounds." The Canberra Times said, "to see a group sweating and roaring and squealing and stomping brings joy to the soul. If there is a top Australian group right now, it has to be Cold Chisel."

== Track listing ==
All songs written by Don Walker, except where noted.

Side one

1. "Conversations"
2. "Shipping Steel"
3. "Breakfast at Sweethearts"
4. "Rising Sun" (Jimmy Barnes)
5. "Choirgirl"

Side two

1. "Khe Sanh"
2. "My Turn to Cry" (Barnes)
3. "Four Walls"
4. "One Long Day"

Side three

1. "Knockin' on Heaven's Door" (Bob Dylan)
2. "My Baby" (Phil Small)
3. "Star Hotel"
4. "Don't Let Go" (Jesse Stone)

Side four

1. "Long as I Can See the Light" (John Fogerty)
2. "The Party's Over"
3. "Cheap Wine"
4. "Goodbye (Astrid Goodbye)" (Walker, Barnes)

=== 2011 remaster ===
Disc one

1. "Conversations"
2. "Juliet" (Walker/Jimmy Barnes)
  - Bonus track
3. "Shipping Steel"
4. "Breakfast at Sweethearts"
5. "Rising Sun" (Barnes)
6. "Never Before" (Ian Moss)
  - Bonus track
7. "Choirgirl"
8. "Khe Sanh"
9. "My Turn to Cry" (Barnes)
10. "Four Walls"
11. "One Long Day"

Disc two

1. "Knockin' on Heaven's Door" (Bob Dylan)
2. "My Baby" (Phil Small)
3. "Ita"
  - Bonus track
4. "Star Hotel"
5. "Don't Let Go" (Jesse Stone)
6. "Long as I Can See the Light" (John Fogerty)
7. "The Party's Over"
8. "Merry-Go-Round"
  - Bonus track
9. "Cheap Wine"
10. "Goodbye (Astrid Goodbye)" (Walker, Barnes)

Notes:

- This expanded edition was re-issued as a 2-LP set in 2018; tracks 1–6 on side one, tracks 7–11 on side two, tracks 12–16 on side three and tracks 17–21 on side four.

== Charts ==
=== Weekly charts ===
Chart (1981)	Peak position
Australia (Kent Music Report)	1
New Zealand Albums (RMNZ)	9

=== Year-end charts ===
Chart (1981)	Peak position
Australia (Kent Music Report)	23

== Certifications ==
Region	Certification	Certified units/sales
Australia (ARIA)	3× Platinum	210,000^{^}
^{^} Shipments figures based on certification alone.

== See also ==
- List of number-one albums in Australia during the 1980s

== Personnel ==
- Jim Barnes - vocals
- Ian Moss - guitar, lead vocals track 9, disc 1 and tracks 2 & 6, disc 2
- Don Walker - organ, piano
- Phil Small - bass
- Steve Prestwich - drums
