= And When I Die, Will I Be Dead? =

1981 Australian radio documentary about death

- Cover of the book adaptation
- Genre: Documentary
- Running time: 108 minutes
- Country of origin: Australia
- Language: English
- Home station: Triple J
- Produced by: Mark Morgan; Carl Tyson-Hall
- Original release: 1981

And When I Die, Will I Be Dead? is a 1981 Australian radio documentary about death and dying that aired on the ABC, produced by Mark Morgan and Carl Tyson-Hall.

== Description ==
The program featured interviews with Elisabeth Kübler-Ross, Ram Dass, columnist Jory Graham and Karl Kruszelnicki.

Two Australians, Allan Lewis and Paul Swain, were also interviewed about their near-death experiences. Lewis had experienced three heart attacks in one day at the age of 14 as the result of a rare condition, and Swain had been electrocuted by a spotlight shortly before the opening of the Sydney Opera House. Both separately reported leaving their bodies, seeing a long, dark tunnel and meeting a presence they named "The Light".

The program was unconventional in that it ran for close to two hours and featured 40 straight minutes of Lewis speaking, including elaborate details of the afterlife as he perceived it. After an eight-week production process and two weekends of mixing, and a last-minute argument about whether it should be broadcast at all, And When I Die, Will I Be Dead? first aired on Triple J at 8 p.m. on Wednesday 21 October 1981.

After an overwhelmingly positive audience response, the program was repeated numerous times on ABC stations throughout Australia during the 1980s. The program also won a National Hi-Fi Award for Morgan and Tyson-Hall.

In 1987, a book adaptation written by Bruce Elder was published by ABC Books.
