= You're Thirteen, You're Beautiful, and You're Mine =

EP (Live) by Cold Chisel
- Released: 20 November 1978
- Recorded: 4 October 1978
- Genre: Pub rock
- Label: Elektra
- Producer: Keith Walker

Cold Chisel chronology
Cold Chisel (1978)	You're Thirteen, You're Beautiful, and You're Mine (1978)	Breakfast at Sweethearts (1979)

You're Thirteen, You're Beautiful, and You're Mine is a live EP by Australian pub rock band Cold Chisel, recorded at the Regent Theatre in Sydney in October 1978 and released in November 1978.

After a long period of unavailability, the EP was re-released as a bonus disc with the second pressing of the compilation album Chisel (1991). The EP was later made available digitally, as well as reissued on disc in 2011.

== Details ==
As seen on the back cover of the album, Ian Moss (left) and Jimmy Barnes (right) are photographed in a toilet, with a flatmate of Barnes' then girlfriend posed topless.

The title is a parody of the song "You're Sixteen" by the Sherman Brothers, which was popularized in 1960 by Johnny Burnette and in 1973 by Ringo Starr. Barnes later said, "At this stage, we were listening to Jerry Lee Lewis and somebody suggested we call the EP 'You're Sixteen, You're Beautiful and You're Mine' after the Jerry Lee Lewis song. I thought because Jerry Lee married his 13-year-old cousin...." (Note: 'You're Sixteen' was not, however, by Lewis). Walker later said the title was "dreamed up at a drunken recording session, and obviously ten thousand other people thought it was funny too".

The front and back covers of the album feature some female nudity, courtesy of a flatmate of Barnes' then girlfriend. Barnes describes it as "the best photo shoot we ever did". This is the only Cold Chisel album to date which features nudity as part of the cover art. Photographer Greg Noakes said, "the band said they knew of a great toilet for the shoot".

It is speculated that the b-sides of 1979's "Choirgirl" singles (7" and 12") are outtakes from this Regent Theatre performance ("Conversations" and "Khe Sanh" respectively). During the fade-in to "Conversations" Barnes can be heard telling the audience, "Keep it up and we'll play "God Save The Queen"". According to his memoir, Working Class Man, Cold Chisel played "God Save The Queen" (Australia's national anthem in 1978) as their opening song at this concert, jokingly intended to compel the entire audience to stand up. (The audience had remained seated during the preceding set by Midnight Oil.)

== Reception ==
Reviewed at the time of release, Juke Magazine said, "Recorded live, Cold Chisel have real fire, an awesome momentum and a bright sound, all of which were completely stifled by the inhibiting surrounding of the studio. Ian Moss shows how inspired he can be with the reins off, and the rest of the band do likewise.

== Track listing ==
All songs by Don Walker except "Wild Thing" by Chip Taylor

Side one

1. "One Long Day"
2. "Home and Broken Hearted"

Side two

1. "Merry-Go-Round"
2. "Mona and the Preacher"
3. "Wild Thing"

1982's German release of the EP is noteworthy: the A-side runs at 45 RPM and the B-side (some pressings) runs at 33 1/3 RPM. Additionally, the tracks have been re-ordered:

Side one

1. "Wild Thing"

Side two

1. "Merry-Go-Round"
2. "Mona and the Preacher"
3. "One Long Day"
4. "Home and Broken Hearted"

== Personnel ==
- Jim Barnes – vocals
- Don Walker – organ, piano
- Ian Moss – guitar, lead vocal on "One Long Day", backing vocals
- Steve Prestwich – drums
- Phil Small – bass guitar

== Charts ==
Chart performance for You're Thirteen, You're Beautiful, and You're Mine
Chart (1978–79)	Peak position
Australian Albums (Kent Music Report)	36

== Certifications ==
Certifications for You're Thirteen, You're Beautiful, and You're Mine
Region	Certification	Certified units/sales
Australia (ARIA)	Gold	35,000^{^}
^{^} Shipments figures based on certification alone.
