= Water into Wine (song) =

Single by Cold Chisel

from the album The Last Wave of Summer
- A-side: "Water into Wine"
- B-side: "A Better Time, A Better Place", "This Time Round", "Child of Mine"
- Released: December 1998
- Recorded: Festival Studios
- Genre: Rock
- Length: 4:54
- Label: Mushroom Records
- Songwriter(s): Steve Prestwich
- Producer(s): Kevin Shirley

Cold Chisel singles chronology
"The Things I Love in You" (1998)	"Water into Wine" (1998)	"Way Down" (1999)

"Water into Wine" is a song by Australian rock band Cold Chisel. It was released in December 1998 as the second single from their sixth studio album, The Last Wave of Summer. The song peaked at number 46 in Australia.

Biographer Michael Lawrence said, "From very early on its lifetime, this song was touted as a possible single. A catchy ballad that sees acoustic guitar appearing in a Cold Chisel song for the first time since "Khe Sanh"."

Before its release, industry figures such as Denis Handlin and Michael Gudinski felt the single would be very successful. However, Kevin Shirley, when mixing, said, "It's a straightforward song to mix and it would make a good b-side. It's not a single. It drags."

== Track listing ==
CD single (MUSH01844.2)

1. "Water into Wine"
2. "A Better Time, A Better Place"
3. "This Time Round"
4. "Child of Mine"

== Charts ==
Chart (1998)	Peak position
Australia (ARIA)	46
