= Lost (Cold Chisel song) =

Single by Cold Chisel

from the album The Perfect Crime
- Released: 28 August 2015
- Length: 4:06
- Label: Universal Music Australia
- Songwriters: Don Walker; Wes Carr
- Producer: Kevin Shirley

Cold Chisel singles chronology
"Everybody" (2012)	"Lost" (2015)	"The Backroom" (2015)

"Lost" is a song by Australian rock band Cold Chisel. The single was released weeks before their 2015 album, The Perfect Crime, that it featured on. A mid-tempo ballad, it reached number 92 in the Australian charts.

The song was shortlisted for Song of the Year at the APRA Music Awards of 2016.

== Details ==
"Lost" was written by regular Cold Chisel songwriter Don Walker and former Australian Idol contestant Wes Carr in 2012. The pair had a number of writing sessions together. Walker said, "After putting out an album of the normal stuff that Idol people have to record, he wanted to do an album of real songs and wanted to see if I could get involved in some co-writing." Carr, who had played the song live for two years before Cold Chisel recorded it, said, ""Lost" is very close to my heart. For me, at that time, I was pretty lost in life. I've always felt like i never really truly have found my place in life."

Barnes said, "The song was classic Cold Chisel. Don's chord changes were as tricky to sing over as ever, but once I found the way they moved, the melodies were perfect. We hadn't been on the singles chart for a long time."

The song did not initially make the short list for the album, before strings and backing vocals were suggested by producer Kevin Shirley. Subsequently, put out as the single, a video was also released.

== Reception ==
The Australian called the song "an honest crack at a stadium-worthy anthem that can be sung at full tilt by the audience, hitting its straps quickly by introducing what becomes the chorus after a mere four-line intro. Barnes’s voice soars, the bridge takes everything up a notch but only so that when it returns to the chorus everything can be stripped right back — and then built right up again."

Rolling Stone Australia said, ""Lost" kicks in with the heart-stopping melody of some vintage Chisel single. Hey that's right, they do radio songs too."

== Personnel ==
- Jimmy Barnes – vocals
- Ian Moss – guitar
- Don Walker – keyboards
- Phil Small – bass
- Charley Drayton – drums

== Charts ==
Chart performance for "Lost"
Chart (2015)	Peak position
Australia (ARIA)	92
