= No Sense =

Single by Cold Chisel

from the album Twentieth Century
- A-side: "Hold Me Tight"; (double A-side)
- Released: October 1983
- Recorded: 1983
- Genre: Rock
- Length: 2:57
- Label: WEA
- Songwriter: Jimmy Barnes

Cold Chisel singles chronology
"When the War Is Over" (1982)	"No Sense" / "Hold Me Tight" (1983)	"Saturday Night" (1984)

"No Sense" is a 1983 song from Australian rock band Cold Chisel, and appeared on the album Twentieth Century. Released as double A-side single with "Hold Me Tight" it reached number 14 in the Australian charts. Receiving more radio airplay of the two songs on the single, it appeared on Cold Chisel's early greatest hits compilations. It has been described as being reggae or "almost ska."

The lyrics of the song were inspired by a fan from Wollongong who would send Barnes letters declaring her love and occasionally threatening suicide. The video was directed by Chilean artist Eduardo Guelfenbein, who had also done the artwork for the album and the picture sleeves. The video featured a slightly different intro to the song.

== Reception ==
Toby Creswell said it featured Barnes' "customarily direct rock song approach, underneath which a very odd keyboard part was placed and on top, a reggaefied guitar. Like so many songs on Twentieth Century, this track takes chances with the formula."

Andrew McMillan wrote in RAM, "the recent release of "No Sense" simply heightens their ideal of self-justification. It's so goddamned abrasive, the last thing that would - under normal circumstances - warrant high rotation airplay. But since they're calling it quits, airplay is guaranteed." Elly McDonald at RAM said the song "drones and the guitar break jars. It's a grating, hard song. It's outstanding."
