= Hold Me Tight (Cold Chisel song) =

Single by Cold Chisel

from the album Twentieth Century
- A-side: "No Sense" (double A-side)
- Released: October 1983
- Recorded: 1983
- Genre: Rock
- Length: 1:42
- Label: WEA
- Songwriter(s): Don Walker

Cold Chisel singles chronology
| "When the War Is Over" (1982) | "Hold Me Tight" / "No Sense" (1983) | "Saturday Night" (1984) |

"Hold Me Tight" is a 1983 song from Australian rock band Cold Chisel, and appeared on the album Twentieth Century. Released as double A-side single with "No Sense", it reached number 14 on the Australian charts. Although the song charted, it failed to receive much radio airplay and did not appear on any later greatest hits compilations.

Lyrically similar to the Cole Porter song "Let's Do It, Let's Fall in Love", it comically lists groups that engage in sexual congress ("Presidents and chauffeurs do it / Terrorists on sofas do it / Movie stars repeat it till it's right"). Musically, it is in the style of 1950s rock songs. Tony Cohen, working with the band for the first time said it was, "a rude song about fucking that lasted about two minutes. It was not great but alright."

The single was released months before the release of the album Twentieth Century. The version that appeared on the album was slightly different from the single version, which had more reverb.

The video was directed by Chilean artist Eduardo Guelfenbein, who had also done the artwork for the album and the picture sleeves.

== Reception ==
Elly McDonald at RAM called it "a disgusting little number, but happy."

== Charts ==
| Chart (1983/84) | Peak position |
|---|---|
| Australia (Kent Music Report) | 14 |
