= Eduardo Guelfenbein =

Chilean painter

Eduardo Guelfenbein (born 16 June 1953) is a painter who was born in Santiago, Chile, educated in England and Italy, who has lived in Paris, France, since 2003. He started out as a figurative painter and was led to abstraction in late 2000.

== Biography ==
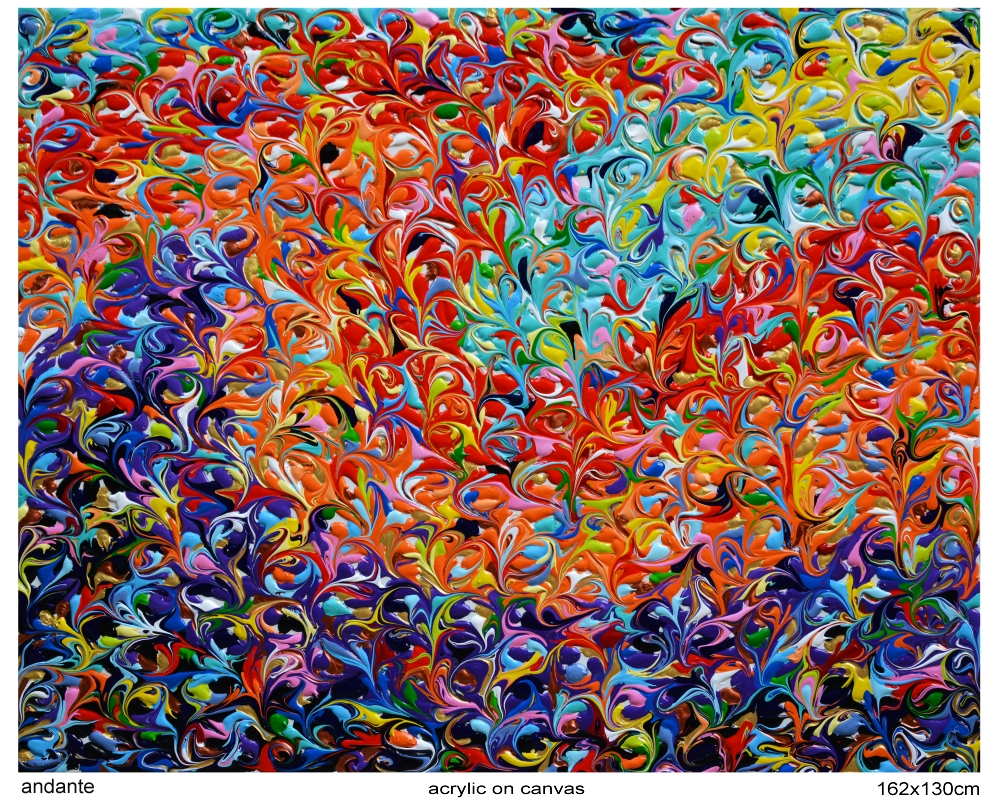
Andante by Gulfenbein

Eduardo Guelfenbein was born in Santiago, Chile, to parents of Russian and Polish origin. He attended Embley Park School, Hampshire, UK (1965–1969) and King's School, Rochester, Kent, UK (1969–1971). In 1971 he realized the backdrops for Tim Rice and Andrew Lloyd Webber's musical Joseph and the Amazing Technicolor Dreamcoat at Rochester Cathedral's first musical presentation.

In 1973–1977 he studied fine arts at the Accademia di Belle Arti Brera, Milan, Italy, graduating with the Diploma di Licenza Accademia in 1977. In 1978, he moved to Sydney, Australia. In 1985, he returned to Europe, settling between Milan and Paris where he resides as of 2016.

His work has appeared in exhibitions internationally, including a solo exhibition at the Museum of Contemporary Art of Santiago in 1997.
