= The Perfect Crime (Cold Chisel album) =

Studio album by Cold Chisel
- Released: 2 October 2015
- Recorded: Studios 301, Sydney; Freight Train Studio, Botany
- Genre: Rock
- Length: 50:47
- Label: Cold Chisel Music
- Producer: Kevin Shirley

Cold Chisel chronology
The Live Tapes Vol. 2 (2014)	The Perfect Crime (2015)	The Live Tapes Vol. 3 (2016)

The Perfect Crime is the eighth studio album by Australian rock band Cold Chisel. It was released on 2 October 2015. It was the first album not to feature a contribution from drummer Steve Prestwich, who died of a brain tumour in January 2011. The album peaked at number 2 on the Australian charts and number 7 in New Zealand.

== Content ==
Recording for the album was done in two sessions in 2014 and 2015. Initial recording was done in Barnes' home studio, with the band working six hours a day on each song. Barnes said, "We recorded this album in two sittings - the first sitting was at my place and we did nine songs, and then about eight months later we did 10 songs at 301." Barnes later said that the album was easy to make, largely because it was the first he had recorded sober.

The album was intended to be more blues orientated than Cold Chisel's recent work. Walker said that he personally wanted an album that was bluesier with no country songs. Barnes said, "We wanted to make a rock record - we wanted to make a record that was more 'up' than the last record we made. We wanted to utilise and focus on what this band does best - which is these rhythm and blues numbers. Steve was more of a rock drummer, and Charley's much more of a rhythm and blues drummer so he brings in these different grooves to things." Walker added, "Cold Chisel does a wide range of stuff … but originally Cold Chisel was a bluesy rock band. I just thought it would be good to do something that focused on that." Moss clarified, "the real rock and roll is from the era of people like Little Richard and Chuck Berry. That's what we're talking about."

Another goal for the band was to have song-writing credits from all of the original members. Walker said, "I wanted it to be a much more diverse album with the writing and where the writing was coming from. And I think to a certain extent we got both of those. Probably still could have been more diverse with sourcing the songs, but that's the way it ended up."

== Songs ==
Two of the songs on the album, the title track and "Four in the Morning", had previously been recorded by Walker and released on his solo albums. Walker was initially hesitant to record them with Cold Chisel, but claimed he was, "swept along in the enthusiasm," of his bandmates.

The first single, "Lost" was co-written by Walker and former Australian Idol contestant Wes Carr in 2012. Walker said, "After putting out an album of the normal stuff that Idol people have to record, he wanted to do an album of real songs and wanted to see if I could get involved in some co-writing." The song was not initially short-listed for inclusion on the album before Shirley suggested the inclusion of strings and backing vocals.

"All Hell Broke Lucy" was inspired the tale of Lucretia Dunkley who was the first woman hanged in Australia in 1843, at Berrima Gaol near Barnes' home. Both of Barnes' songwriting contributions to the album were co-written with his son-in-law Ben Rodgers.

"Down-and-dirty disco highlight," "Bus Station" was written by Walker in the eighties. The lyrics include the line, "Fat girl with a travel rug / She’s got a Chiko Roll". Barnes said, "Yeah, the fat girl holding a Chiko Roll under a blanket line. Don, being a voyeur, thought it was sexy. It’s very symbolic. Don is a very sick man."

"The Mansions" was inspired by an incident in Kings Cross where Walker saw a riot squad raid a brothel and arrest an escaped prisoner. As the prisoner was led away, the early morning drinkers at the Mansions Hotel serenaded him as the jukebox played "My Way". Walker said, "Monty Python couldn't put this together. All these drunks out on the sidewalk, the kind of people who are drinking at 7am, bawling out 'I did it My Way'. Fantastic."

The Australian described "Mexican Wedding" as "the one that's hardest for the more conservative rock aficionados to come at – but hear it out. It'll repay you. The Latino bar-band feel would likely fall apart in lesser hands, but here it just makes sense, swaggering with almost a Bruce Springsteen/Tom Waits kind of jauntiness. Way more than a novelty song, even if it feels a little like it at first."

== Critical reception ==
The Australian declared the album a typical contribution from Cold Chisel. "Jimmy Barnes screaming like a Torana doing a burnout on blown tyres. Awkward harmonies. Lyrics about trucks, police, women and 'feeling like shit'. A beat you can dance to without spilling your beer, and guitar solos you can’t. Staccato notes filling silence with menace and brooding. And so on."

The Sydney Morning Herald also declared the album "unmistakable Chisel. It delves further back to their rock'n'roll roots with chief songwriter Don Walker carving up the keys, guitarist Ian Moss both gritty and sublime." It was awarded four of a possible five stars.

Reviewed in Rolling Stone Australia, the first song was said to "slam in at full tilt, Don Walker hammering a low left-hand boogie while Jimmy Barnes exercises a newfound clarity in his upper register." It was noted that the band "rush at their second album in three years with the reckless exhilaration of greener days."

== Track listing ==
No.	Title	Writer(s)	Length
1.	"Alone for You"	Walker	3:10
2.	"The Backroom"	Walker	3:35
3.	"All Hell Broke Lucy"	Barnes, Ben Rodgers	4:06
4.	"The Perfect Crime"	Walker	2:40
5.	"Long Dark Road"	Barnes, Ben Rodgers	4:34
6.	"Four in the Morning"	Walker	5:22
7.	"The Mansions"	Walker	3:13
8.	"The Toast of Paris"	Walker	4:43
9.	"Shoot the Moon"	Moss, Matt Scullion	3:30
10.	"Mexican Wedding"	Walker, Small, Moss	3:35
11.	"Get Lucky"	Small	3:02
12.	"Bus Station"	Walker	5:12
13.	"Lost"	Walker, Wes Carr	4:06
14.	"Romantic Lies" (bonus track)	Walker	3:30
15.	"Blue Flame" (bonus track)	Walker	4:14
Total length:			58:32

== Personnel ==
- Jimmy Barnes – lead vocals, backing vocals
- Ian Moss – guitars, backing vocals, lead vocals ("Get Lucky", "Shoot the Moon")
- Phil Small – bass, backing vocals
- Don Walker – keyboards, piano, backing vocals
- Charley Drayton – drums, backing vocals

== Chart positions ==
=== Weekly charts ===
Chart (2015)	Peak position
Australian Albums (ARIA)	2
New Zealand Albums (RMNZ)	7

=== Year-end charts ===
Chart (2015)	Position
Australian Albums (ARIA)	47

== Certifications ==
Region	Certification	Certified units/sales
Australia (ARIA)	Gold	35,000^{^}
^{^} Shipments figures based on certification alone.
