= Twentieth Century (Cold Chisel album) =

Studio album by Cold Chisel
- Released: April 1984
- Recorded: September 1983 – January 1984
- Studio: Rhinceros, Paradise, Studios 301, Capitol Theatre, Sydney; Richmond, Melbourne
- Genre: Pub rock
- Length: 44:25
- Label: WEA
- Producer: Cold Chisel

Cold Chisel chronology
Northbound (1983)	Twentieth Century (1984)	Barking Spiders Live: 1983 (1984)

Singles from Twentieth Century
- 1. "Hold Me Tight / No Sense" Released: October 1983; 2. "Saturday Night" Released: March 1984; 3. "Twentieth Century" Released: 1984; 4. "Flame Trees" Released: August 1984

Twentieth Century is the fifth studio album by Australian band Cold Chisel, and their final until the group reformed in 1998. The album was written and recorded over various sessions during the period of the band's break-up and during breaks in their final tour. It was released in early 1984 and peaked at No. 1 on the Australian albums chart, their third consecutive album to do so. It charted for a total of 46 weeks.

== Background ==
Twentieth Century was the first recording to vary the core members of Cold Chisel, with Steve Prestwich having been sacked during the previous year's tour of Germany. For all but three songs, he was replaced by Ray Arnott. The band had announced its intention to separate in August 1983, and by December had played its final shows (before reunion), months before the release of the album.

Tensions within the band were particularly high. Although Arnott was the drummer on most of the album, Prestwich was playing on the band's farewell tour. There were problems with the incompatibility of equipment when recording was done at different studios. Barnes was to later say that he felt intimidated when his more personal songs were competing against Walker's for album space, with songs such as "No Second Prize", later a solo hit, being rejected by the band. He also felt he wanted the band to be more "rocking", while Moss wanted to experiment with his guitar playing and Prestwich was unwilling to play straightforward rock and roll. Barnes had said he was only willing to do the album if everyone received even royalties, "No matter who wrote the fucking things." He had three songs on the album, the only person besides Walker to have an unshared credit.

Singer Barnes said of the album, "While there are some great songs on it, I don't think it was one of our great records - it was fragmented and sounds like a dying band, but it marked the end of an era." In his autobiography, Barnes claimed the songs were underdone, and the band would have continued writing for another year if it wasn't for their break-up.

Don Walker's feelings were stronger, saying, "The album was a nightmare. It was one of the two or three nightmares of my life. At that time relations within the band were barely above speaking terms. The business and money side of it were incredibly bitter between several people." Mark Opitz said, "With Cold Chisel I was there for the breakthrough and the break-up. And let me tell you, the breakthrough album was a lot more fun."

The original choice of producer, Tony Cohen, had to leave the project due to health problems, exacerbated by tensions during the recording. He was still listed as the sound engineer. He said that Walker wanted a rawer recording, "bashing it out rough and hard", whereas "Barnesy wanted to be like The Eagles, like some LA production thing. Opitz, who had worked with the band on the previous three albums, was asked to assist with the recording. "Essentially they wanted me to do the same thing I'd always done, but pay me less," Opitz said.

The art work for the album was done by Chilean artist Eduardo Guelfenbein, a friend of Walker's, who was also responsible for directing the videos for the songs "Hold Me Tight" and "No Sense".

== Reception ==
Despite the feeling of the band members, the album was mostly well received and sold well. "Flame Trees" and "Saturday Night" receive strong airplay on classic rock stations in Australia decades after release.

Reviewed at the time of release, Juke Magazine said the standout track was "Saturday Night" ("an appealing track with many of Chisel's best qualities filtered through a clever mix. The melody relies heavily on Phil Small's excellent bass line"), but surmised, "as a showcase of Cold Chisel's techniques and abilities Twentieth Century is a mixed bag".

The Sun (Sydney) noted, "It's cruel that a band should make its last album its best. Don Walker dominates the song-writing, as usual. He now combines what could be sentimental lyrics with an awesome power and pace. He is reflective, introspective and succinct." New Zealand magazine Rip It Up said, "The big plus is Don Walker, Chisel's best songwriter, contributes the most songs. Walker's incisive musical arrangements coupled with his looking glass lyrics give Barnes the scope to exercise his awesome set of tonsils in a constructive way. Barnes' own compositions tend to reduce him to a shouter." The Age called it, "by far the best album Cold Chisel has recorded".

== Track listing ==
All songs written by Don Walker, except as noted.

Side one

1. "Build This Love" – 4:01
2. "Twentieth Century" – 2:17
3. "Ghost Town" – 1:20
4. "Saturday Night" – 4:26
5. "Painted Doll" – 2:19
6. "No Sense" (Jimmy Barnes) – 3:10
7. "Flame Trees" (Steve Prestwich/Walker) – 4:24

Side two

1. "Only One" (Barnes) – 3:41
2. "Hold Me Tight" – 1:42
3. "Sing to Me" – 4:49
4. "The Game" (Phil Small/Walker) – 5:13
5. "Janelle" – 3:40
6. "Temptation" (Barnes) – 3:23

== Personnel ==
Cold Chisel

- Jim Barnes – lead vocals, guitar
- Ian Moss – lead guitar, backing vocals, lead vocals on "Saturday Night" and "Janelle"
- Don Walker – organ, piano, keyboard
- Ray Arnott – drums on all songs except "No Sense", "Flame Trees" and "The Game", percussion
- Phil Small – bass guitar
- Steve Prestwich – drums on "No Sense", "Flame Trees" and "The Game"

Additional personnel

- Megan Williams and Venetta Fields – backing vocals on "Flame Trees"
- Billy Rogers – saxophone
- John Hoffman – trumpet
- Buzz Bidstrup – percussion
- David Blight – harmonica
- Venetta Fields – backing vocals

== Charts ==
=== Weekly charts ===
Chart (1984–85)	Peak position
Australian Albums (Kent Music Report)	1

=== Year-end charts ===
Chart (1984)	Position
Australian Albums (Kent Music Report)	15

== Certifications ==
Certifications for Twentieth Century
Region	Certification	Certified units/sales
Australia (ARIA)	2× Platinum	140,000^{^}
^{^} Shipments figures based on certification alone.

== See also ==
- List of number-one albums in Australia during the 1980s#1984
- List of Top 25 albums for 1984 in Australia
