= The Things I Love in You =

Single by Cold Chisel

from the album The Last Wave of Summer
- B-side: "Smalltown Motel Blues", "Yakuza Girls"
- Released: 16 August 1998
- Recorded: Festival
- Genre: Rock
- Length: 3:22
- Label: Mushroom
- Songwriter(s): Don Walker

Cold Chisel singles chronology
"Yesterdays" (1995)	"The Things I Love in You" (1998)	"Water into Wine" (1998)

"The Things I Love in You" is a song by Australian rock band Cold Chisel. It was released in August 1998 as the lead single from their sixth studio album, The Last Wave of Summer (1998). The song peaked at number 10 in Australia and 43 in New Zealand.

== Details ==
Barnes claimed the song was about, "a guy standing on a street corner, drinking a beer, while his girlfriend is upstairs doing to someone else what he'd love her to do to him, and he thinks about killing them both." He said that the released version was his first take, and afterwards, "I lay on the floor covered in sweat and exhausted. I just had no more left to offer."

Author Don Walker said, "One stage I was mucking around with some songs with Spencer Jones and I showed him the idea because I thought he might be able to finish it off. I didn't think it was anything special, but the other people in the band jumped on it immediately, in particular Jim. Jim said, 'That to me is a Cold Chisel song.'" Musically, Walker described the song as, "five white guys trying to copy the Motown sound of the Four Tops."

The song was rehearsed in a number of different arrangements for at least a year before recording. The recorded version featured shortened verses (recommended to Walker by Charles Fisher) and a key-change after the chorus.

== Track listing ==
CD single (MUSH01808.2)

1. "The Things I Love in You" - 3:22
2. "Smalltown Motel Blues" - 4:56
3. "Yakuza Girls" - 2:31
4. "The Things I Love in You" (Joe Bishara Remix) - 3:57

== Charts ==
=== Weekly charts ===
Chart (1998)	Peak position
Australia (ARIA)	10
New Zealand (Recorded Music NZ)	43

=== Year-end charts ===
Chart (1998)	Position
Australian Singles Chart	78

== Certifications ==
Region	Certification	Certified units/sales
Australia (ARIA)	Gold	35,000^{^}
^{^} Shipments figures based on certification alone.
