= Boxing ring =

Space in which a boxing match occurs

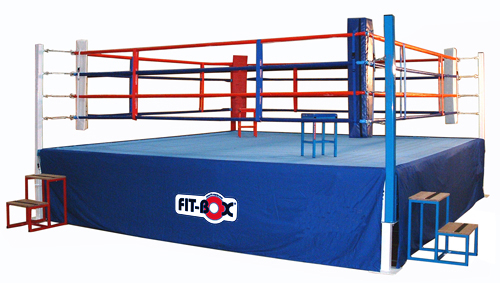
An AIBA/IBA full-sized competition ring

A boxing ring, often referred to simply as a ring or the squared circle, is the space in which a boxing match occurs. A modern ring consists of a square raised platform with a post at each corner. Four ropes are attached to the posts and pulled parallel under tension with turnbuckles to form the boundary of the competition area. It also traditionally features a red corner for the higher ranked, more experienced, crowds favorite or home boxer and a blue corner for the lower ranked, less experienced or guest boxer.

== Construction ==
As there are a number of professional boxing organizations, the standards of construction vary. A standard ring is between 16 and 24 feet (4.9 and 7.3 m) to a side between the ropes with another 2 feet (0.61 m) outside. The platform of the ring is generally 3 to 4 feet (0.91 to 1.22 m) from the ground and is covered by about 1 inch (25 mm) of padding topped by stretched canvas. The ropes are approximately 1 inch (25 mm) in diameter and at heights of 18, 30, 42, and 54 inches (.46, .76, 1.07, and 1.37 m) above the mat, held up on posts rising around 5 feet (1.5 m) above the mat. The ropes are attached together with spacers that prevent them from spreading too far apart. Construction of the ring environment extends to maximization of lighting in the ring, minimization of heat of the lighting, and a complete as possible cut-off of illumination at the ringside. Construction differs from the similar wrestling ring. A wrestling ring sports only three ropes (which may be sheathed steel cable) and is constructed to provide a more flexible mat surface than a boxing ring.

== History and terminology ==
The name "ring" is a relic from when contests were fought in a roughly drawn circle on the ground. The name ring continued with the London Prize Ring Rules in 1743, which specified a small circle in the centre of the fight area where the boxers met at the start of each round. The first square ring was introduced by the Pugilistic Society in 1838. That ring was specified as 24 feet (7.3 m) square and bound by two ropes. For these and other reasons, the boxing ring is commonly referred to as the "squared circle". The term "ringside seat" dates as far back as the 1860s.

== Rules involving the ring ==
Boxing rules also define situations in which a boxer leaves the ring during a bout. Under the Unified Rules of Boxing used by the Association of Boxing Commissions, a boxer who is knocked out of the ring receives a 20-second count and must return to the ring without assistance; assistance may result in a point deduction or disqualification at the referee's discretion.

== Other configurations ==
Some promotions hold fights in other types of rings, like a four-rope circular ring (BKFC) or a triangular one (BYB Extreme Fighting Series).

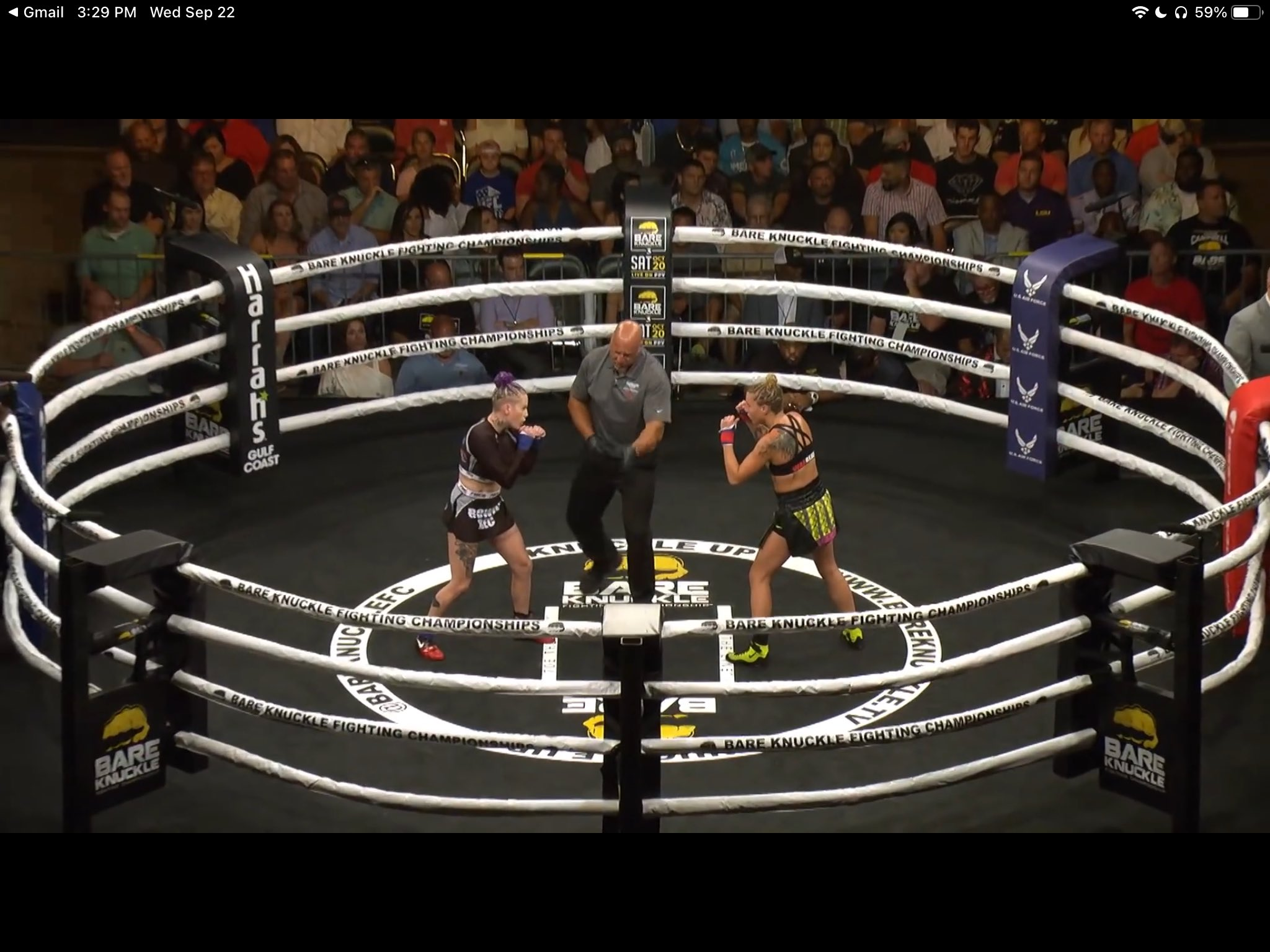
Circular ring

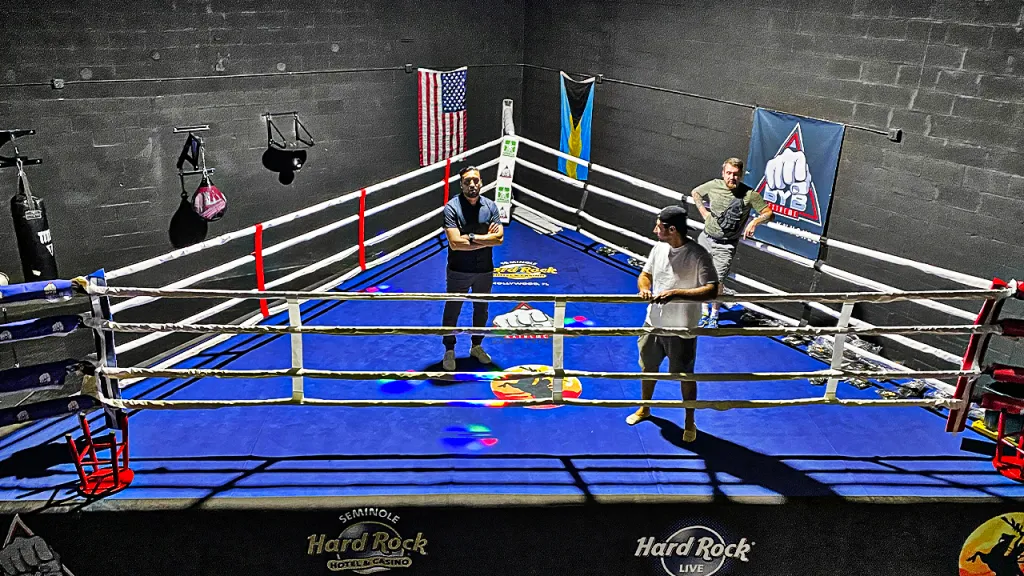
Triangular ring

== See also ==
- Ring girl
- Dohyō
- Mixed martial arts cage
