= Cold Chisel (album) =

Studio album by Cold Chisel
- Released: 24 April 1978
- Recorded: January – April 1978
- Studios: Trafalgar Studios, Sydney
- Genre: Pub rock
- Length: 36:08
- Label: Atlantic
- Producer: Peter Walker

Cold Chisel chronology
Cold Chisel (1978)	You're Thirteen, You're Beautiful, and You're Mine (1978)

Singles from Cold Chisel
- 1. "Khe Sanh" Released: May 1978

Cold Chisel is the debut album of Australian pub rock band Cold Chisel. Released in April 1978, it spent 23 weeks in the Australian charts, peaking at number 38.

== Album details ==
The album artwork was done by Abby Beaumont, conceptualised with Walker. The figure in the foreground of the cover is Micki Braithwaite, Daryl Braithwaite's wife.

"Cold Chisel" was produced by the inexperienced Peter Walker, who had previously played guitar with Bakery and been an inspiration to young Ian Moss. The release of the album was hurried to coincide with a tour the band had opening for Foreigner. Although the album was well-received, Don Walker was later to say he found it embarrassing, especially the "flowery" lyrics.

Producer Peter Walker intended the album to be a showcase of the breadth of Don Walker's song-writing, and the songs range between jazz-and-blues-based ballads to hard rock. He said, "it was a responsibility I always felt, to capture what the band was." Don Walker, who wrote the lyrics for all the songs, described the album as being about a former lover that he had separated from long before recording commenced. He said, "I'm involved there, sometimes to the detriment of the song. 'Cause those songs were not great." Barnes felt that early fans of the band's live performances may have been disappointed, with Don Walker agreeing, "It's a bit more laid back than it should have been. That would have been OK if the 'up' songs has been a bit more energetic, like they are onstage." He also said, "We were inexperienced in the studio, so the result is more stilted than when we were live, but it's as good as we could do at that time." Elsewhere, he noted the recordings were "built" and "not performances".

Barnes, while defending Peter Walker, found the recording experience unsatisfying. He said, "He liked to explain the ins and outs of recording to us. I could only hear so much about compression ratios before I wanted to blow a gasket and get really drunk." Elsewhere, Barnes noted, "We were not used to being in that recording studio environment. We sort of walked around the place bumping into each other until we let go of the reins and let the producer take over."

The band initially saw themselves as an "album band" like Led Zeppelin that was less reliant on singles, and had not intended to release a single from the album. Barnes said, "Every DJ in the country begged us to release "Khe Sanh" as a single. Then they banned it two weeks later. They had to ban something once a week to keep the Catholic Church happy."

== Reception ==
AllMusic praised the, "lyrical imagery, the mix of musical finesse and freneticism, and Barnes' razor-wire vocals," and described the album as a, "stunning debut album. At once polished and raw, this is a classic."

The album received a warm review in the Sydney Morning Herald, saying, "The blues down under have been captured occasionally on record in the past. Richard Clapton was successful at it. Now we have Cold Chisel, wailing with compassion and conviction." The reviewer, Gil Wahlquist, noted the band had, "got together an impressive string of musical portraits of life in the city."

The Canberra Times said, "Cold Chisel have delivered a very impressive debut which leave me at odds in trying to lay any constructive criticism - the band just exudes potential." Roadrunner said the music had a, "solid blues base." The lyrics were, "not your standard introspective stuff. It's a truly Australian album, it explores Australian themes, talks about things that happen here and even uses the names of our towns. Only The Dingoes and Richard Clapton (and perhaps Skyhooks) have done this before.

Warwick McFadyen said the album was, "lightning in a bottle. It flashed and sparked, an explosion of electrical storms that at times turned into a smooth slow river of mercury. It was jazz anarchy in its attitude; fast, loud, angry, sad, melancholic, resigned, defiant. Let the heavens rain upon me, they never bettered it."

== Track listing ==
All songs by Don Walker, except as noted

Side one

1. "Juliet" (Walker, Jim Barnes) – 2:43
2. "Khe Sanh" – 4:14
3. "Home and Broken Hearted" – 3:25
4. "One Long Day" – 7:23

Side two

1. "Northbound" – 3:14
2. "Rosaline" – 4:47
3. "Daskarzine" – 5:09
4. "Just How Many Times" – 5:13

In 1999, Atlantic released a remastered version of the album with four bonus tracks:

1. "Teenage Love Affair" – 6:03 (from the 1994 compilation album Teenage Love)
2. "Drinkin' in Port Lincoln" – 3:24 (also from the 1994 compilation album Teenage Love)
3. "H-Hour Hotel" – 3:26
4. "On the Road" – 3:13

"H-Hour Hotel" and "On the Road" are included on the 2011 compilation album, Besides.

== Personnel ==
- Jim Barnes – lead vocals (tracks 1–3, 5, 7, 8)
- Ian Moss – guitar, backing vocals; lead vocals (tracks 4, 6)
- Don Walker – organ, piano, backing vocals
- Steve Prestwich – drums
- Phil Small – bass guitar
- Dave Blight – harmonica (tracks 2 and 5)
- Peter Walker – acoustic guitar (track 2)
- Wilbur Wilde – saxophone (tracks 3, 6 and 8)
- Joe Camilleri – saxophone
- Janice Slater – backing vocals
- Carol Stubbley – backing vocals

== Charts ==
Chart performance for Cold Chisel
Chart (1978)	Peak position
Australian Albums (Kent Music Report)	31

== Certifications and sales ==
Region	Certification	Certified units/sales
Australia (ARIA)	Gold	20,000^{^}
^{^} Shipments figures based on certification alone.
