= Breakfast at Sweethearts =

Studio album by Cold Chisel
- Released: February 1979
- Recorded: July 1978 – January 1979
- Studios: Albert Studios, Sydney
- Genre: Pub rock
- Length: 36:23
- Label: Atlantic
- Producer: Richard Batchens

Cold Chisel chronology
You're Thirteen, You're Beautiful, and You're Mine (1978)	Breakfast at Sweethearts (1979)	East (1980)

Singles from Breakfast at Sweethearts
- 1. "Goodbye (Astrid Goodbye)" Released: September 1978; 2. "Breakfast at Sweethearts" Released: March 1979; 3. "Shipping Steel" Released: July 1979 (limited)

Breakfast at Sweethearts is the second studio album by Australian pub rock band Cold Chisel, released in February 1979. It spent 32 weeks in the national charts, reaching a peak of number 4.

== Album details ==
"Sweethearts" was a cafè in Kings Cross, Sydney, Australia in the 1970s and 1980s, but has since been demolished. It was located where the present-day McDonald's is now, in the middle of Kings Cross. The song "Plaza" refers to Sydney's Plaza Hotel, where Don Walker was living in Kings Cross at the time. Walker later said, "As a whole set of songs, it painted a picture of a certain time and a certain place which is very close to my heart. And in many ways that set of songs is quite personal to me rather than any of the other guys because they all moved out of the Cross within three weeks. It was a good time of my life." Author Louis Nowra described the song "Breakfast at Sweethearts" as, "the most immediately identifiable song about the Cross."

The first single, "Goodbye (Astrid Goodbye)" preceded the album by some months, and was recorded when demos were being done for the album. Reaching number 65 on the national charts, the single is markedly different from the later album version.

The recording took place over a period of more than 6 months. Don Walker said, "It was a very bad low point for the band. We were constantly touring and when we got a weekend off we were thrown into the studio and expected to be creative." Barnes said, "There are really great songs on that record, but it wasn't the most enjoyable recording process. We wanted to go into Studio One at Alberts, where AC/DC and The Angels were doing great records. We booked, but couldn't get in, so we ended up in Studio Three, which was a new studio and didn't have the same atmosphere." Elsewhere, he said, "Breakfast at Sweethearts stunk, and you can spell that f-u-c-k-e-d."

Although reviews were generally positive and some of the songs were later live staples, the members of Cold Chisel were unhappy with the sound of Breakfast at Sweethearts and the production methods of Richard Batchens. Batchens would later admit that this was an unhappy period of his life, and the band felt he was overly critical and the recording suffered from lack of spontaneity. Batchens was used at the behest of the record company that wanted a known producer, and Batchens had recently produced Richard Clapton's fourth studio album, Goodbye Tiger, which the band admired. Walker said, "he made it quite clear to me that they weren't as good as Richard Clapton's songs." Barnes added, "We went into the studio with him and it was absolutely disastrous - we were in a shit room with this bad tempered cunt. But don't quote me. Don't say he was bad tempered."

== Reception ==
At the 1979 TV Week/Countdown Music Awards, Breakfast at Sweethearts was nominated for Best Australian Album, and won for Best Australian Record Cover Design. The cover photo was taken in the heritage-listed Marble Bar in the Sydney Hilton.

AllMusic said, "the songs on this album may comprise the best set of any of the band's non-compilation studio discs," but notes, "it is a masterpiece tainted by a poor recording job." The reviewer notes, "Don Walker's songwriting -- and his storycrafting around local references -- could engage a listener underwater." The album is given a score of four stars from a possible five.

Reviewed in Roadrunner at the time of release, it was said, "If you're into good, driving rock, it's as good an album as you'll get anywhere in the world," though it was noted that some of the songs were, "a bit too samey." Juke Magazine noted the album was not, "just a collection of songs. It exudes a conceptual aura at street level, cleverly indigenous. The main vehicle for this is Don Walker's lyrics." Rip It Up was less positive, describing Barnes singing as, "white boy sings the blues and gets laryngitis" and the lyrics as "predictably sexist" but, "what saves their ass is the tunes".

The third single from the album, "Shipping Steel", was described as, "Gutsy Australian hard rock and the best thing Chisel have done since the marvelous "Khe Sanh". Will pick up airplay, and why not?"

== Track listing ==
All songs written by Don Walker, except as noted

Side one

1. "Conversations" – 4:34
2. "Merry-Go-Round" – 3:44
3. "Dresden" (Walker, Ian Moss) – 3:58
4. "Goodbye (Astrid Goodbye)" (Jim Barnes, Walker) – 2:51
5. "Plaza" – 2:09

Side two

1. "Shipping Steel" – 3:24
2. "I'm Gonna Roll Ya" – 3:28
3. "Showtime" – 3:44
4. "Breakfast at Sweethearts" – 4:11
5. "The Door" – 4:20

In 1999, EastWest released a remastered version of the album with three bonus tracks:

11. "It Ain't Wrong" – 3:13 (from the 1994 compilation album Teenage Love)
12. "Mona and the Preacher" – 4:00 (also from the 1994 compilation album Teenage Love)
13. "Metho Blues" – 4:35

== Personnel ==
- Jim Barnes – vocals
- Don Walker – organ, piano
- Ian Moss – guitar, vocals, lead vocal (track 5)
- Steve Prestwich – drums
- Phil Small – bass guitar
- David Blight – harmonica
- Tony Faehse – slide guitar, track 6

== Charts ==
=== Weekly charts ===
Chart (1979)	Peak position
Australian Albums (Kent Music Report)	4

=== Year-end charts ===
Chart (1979)	Position
Australian Albums (Kent Music Report)	15

== Certifications and sales ==
Region	Certification	Certified units/sales
Australia (ARIA)	Platinum	50,000^{^}
^{^} Shipments figures based on certification alone.

== See also ==
- List of Top 25 albums for 1979 in Australia
