= Andrew McMillan (writer) =

Australian writer, music journalist and musician (1957–2012)

- Born: 29 December 1957; Melbourne, Victoria, Australia
- Died: 28 January 2012 (aged 54); Darwin, Northern Territory, Australia
- Occupation: Music journalist

Andrew McMillan (29 December 1957 – 28 January 2012) was an Australian writer, music journalist and musician who was based in Darwin, Northern Territory, from 1988.

== Early life ==
Andrew McMillan was born on 29 December 1957 and was educated in Brisbane, Queensland. McMillan moved to Darwin in 1988, after travelling with the bands Midnight Oil and the Warumpi Band on the Blackfella-Whitefella tour of remote Aboriginal communities in the NT.

That experience led him to write the book Strict Rules: The Blackfella-Whitefella Tour which was published in 1988 (Hodder & Stoughton) and reprinted in 1992 (Sceptre).

McMillan wrote music journalism, popular history, essays, poetry, and a play Dingo Calling. Much of his writing was informed by his life in the Northern Territory. His articles and essays appeared in a range of publications including Rolling Stone, The Monthly, Griffith Review, Meanjin and Northern Perspective. He was deeply engaged with Aboriginal communities in the NT and the issues facing Aboriginal Australians.

His other books included Death in Dili (1992), Catalina Dreaming (2002, 2010), and An Intruders Guide to East Arnhem Land (2001, 2007). The latter was recognised by winning the Territory Read – Northern Territory Book of the Year award in 2009 after being a finalist in the Northern Territory History Awards in 2008.

McMillan died in Darwin on 28 January 2012 after contracting bowel and liver cancer. The proceeds of his estate were used to establish the Andrew McMillan Memorial Retreat for emerging writers through the Northern Territory Writers' Centre.

McMillan's personal collection of writings, interviews, papers and audio material is held by the Northern Territory Library in Darwin.

== Music career ==
McMillan was also a musician, songwriter, founder of the band, The Rattling Mudguards, and member of the Darwin-based performance group, 'Darwin's 4th Estate', which was made up of musicians and journalists. It often incorporated typewriters as instruments while commenting on current affairs from a journalist's perspective. Their album Bleeding Fingers was released in 2007.

== Awards and recognition ==
McMillan was awarded an Australia Council for the Arts Literature Board grant for established writers in 2004 and the Northern Territory Book of the Year Award for An Intruder's Guide to East Arnhem Land. His short stories, 'Who Can Blame Us for That?' and 'First Lady' won the Arafura Short Story Award category of the Northern Territory Literary Awards in 2004 and 2003 respectively.
