= Saturday Night (Cold Chisel song) =

Single by Cold Chisel

from the album Twentieth Century
- B-side: "Painted Doll"
- Released: March 1984
- Recorded: 1983
- Genre: Pub rock
- Label: WEA
- Songwriter: Don Walker
- Producers: Mark Opitz, Cold Chisel

Cold Chisel singles chronology
"Hold Me Tight" / "No Sense" (1983)	"Saturday Night" (1984)	"Twentieth Century" (1984)

"Saturday Night" is a 1984 single by Australian rock band Cold Chisel, the second released from the album Twentieth Century and the first to be issued after the band's official break-up. The vocals are shared between Ian Moss and Jimmy Barnes. It just missed out on becoming the band's third Top 10 single, stalling at number 11 on the Australian chart for two weeks, but it remains one of Cold Chisel's highest charting songs.

At the 1984 Countdown Music Awards, the video was nominated for Best Video.

== Details ==
The album track features ambient noise recorded in Sydney's Kings Cross district, including the sound of motorbikes, strip club spruikers and crowds of drunks, recorded by author Don Walker on a portable stereo. Also recorded are Walker's favourite busker and a snippet of Dragon's "Rain". Engineer Tony Cohen helped with the street recording. He said, "I was abused by several people. Don lived in the Cross. He loved it and was friendly with a lot of locals. I became the target for angry drug dealers." The album version appears on later greatest hits albums and is most frequently played on radio. The original single version omits the street sounds. Although Walker was unhappy with many of the songs from the Twentieth Century album, he later said he was particularly pleased with the production on "Saturday Night", which he was mostly responsible for.

Don Walker has said of the song, "The band I'd been in for ten years was breaking up. I think it's just a 'kissing all that goodbye and moving on into the unknown' song." He later said, "The song is actually about walking away from a Saturday night. The song was pretty much built before the other guys cottoned on to what I was doing. I can remember Mark Opitz suddenly saying, 'I get this, this is really good.'" Early drafts of the song were titled, "Show Me A Light".

Author Michael P. Jensen said, "These guys were supposed to be bogan heroes, but they slip a little French into their songs. 'L'esclavage D'amour' is 'the slavery of love'. The deep longing of the man walking his way around the city on the busiest night of the week is matched by his loneliness." "Saturday Night" spent 14 weeks in the national charts, peaking at number 11. The art work for the single was done by Chilean artist Eduardo Guelfenbein, who had also done the artwork for the album and a number of videos for the band.

In 2007, Grinspoon covered "Saturday Night" for the tribute album Standing on the Outside. Kylie Auldist released a disco version in 2016.

From the video, Ian Moss and Phil Small outside a strip club in Kings Cross

== Video ==
A video clip for the track, directed by Richard Lowenstein, was filmed in Kings Cross in February 1984, three months after the group disbanded. Part of the clip features Moss and Barnes mingling with the participants of the Sydney Gay and Lesbian Mardi Gras. Lowenstein said the idea came from his friend Troy Davies. "At the time it wasn’t so accepted for straight guys to go there. I think Troy was worried how they’d deal with his extrovert gayness. It was brave at the time to have the gay Mardi Gras in a Cold Chisel video on Countdown. That was Troy, he was a mischief maker. But Cold Chisel lapped it up," Lowenstein said. Other sections of the clip showing the band members (minus Barnes) moving through the crowd of the Darlinghurst Road red light district. Lowenstein said, "I had a camera on the back of a station wagon, we'd just drive up and down the Cross and film in slow motion. The song suited that kind of imagery so well, I thought it was a no-brainer to put the down and outs and all the characters in. It was a quick shoot, maybe two nights."

It was nominated for Best Video at The TV Week / Countdown Awards.

== Reception ==
Reviewed in Juke Magazine at the time of release, it was described as, "Another of those sparse, atmospheric songs. They haven't lost their edge over all these years, which is really sayin' something." Elsewhere, they called it, "an appealing track with many of Chisel's best qualities filtered through a clever mix. The melody relies heavily on Phil Small's excellent bass line". The Age also noted Small's bass, and, "The echoing drumbeat of Ray Arnott".

Marc Hunter, Paul Hewson and Robert Taylor reviewed the single for RAM, saying, "This shows why Chisel are a top band — they're prepared to take chances. Ian Moss sings superbly; the band plays with restraint but perfect taste... Has to be a hit." The Sydney Morning Herald called the song a "pleasant ballad" but noted "hard-core fans may take to the b-side, "Painted Doll", more readily". Dodson also called it, "the most uncharacteristic Cold Chisel single ever. But it seems to have struck an immediate chord with Australian record-buyers".

The Monthly said, "In many ways it represents the best of Cold Chisel. The music fades in slowly over the sound of voices and traffic, with an arrangement that borrows from soul (Marvin Gaye comes to mind), but isn’t quite that. Moss, the more melodious of Cold Chisel’s vocalists, takes the lead, with Barnes chipping in for an explosive interlude. Electric guitar and saxophone are woven together in a twisting instrumental melody." Elly McDonald at RAM said the "lyrics read especially well on paper: direct, genuine, sane."

== Charts ==
Chart (1984)	Peak position
Australia (Kent Music Report)	11
