= Rock Australia Magazine =

Australian music magazine

- Editor: Anthony O'Grady
- Editor: Greg Taylor
- Editor: Phil Stafford
- Staff writers: Stuart Coupe; Andrew McMillan; Clinton Walker; Bernard Zuel; Jack Marx
- Photographer: Francine McDougall
- Categories: Music
- Frequency: Fortnightly
- Format: Tabloid
- Founder: Anthony O'Grady, Phillip Mason
- First issue: 8 March 1975
- Final issue: July 1989
- Company: Soundtracks Publishing; Eastern Suburbs Newspapers
- Based in: Darlinghurst, New South Wales
- Language: English
- ISSN: 0312-0767

Rock Australia Magazine or RAM (its acronym and popular name) was a fortnightly national Australian music newspaper, which was published from 1975 to 1989. It was designed for people with a serious interest in rock and pop, and was considered the journal of record for the Australian music scene, along the way producing some of the country's best writers on music and popular culture.

== History ==
RAM was founded in Sydney by Anthony O'Grady – a former advertising copywriter who had contributed to the earlier pop weekly, Go-Set, in its dying days, and had edited the short-lived Ear for Music magazine – and Phillip Mason, a young British publishing executive with the IPC media empire who'd been seconded to Australia. It was modelled on the English music trade papers, New Musical Express and Melody Maker, and O'Grady's stated objective was that there would be no drop in quality between the copy it imported from those papers - which it was able to arrange thanks to Philip Mason's relationship with his former employers, who owned both the NME and MM - and the copy it generated domestically, which had been the case with previous Australian rock magazines.

There were three eras of RAM, each defined by their editors/ownerships – with O'Grady, Greg Taylor and Phil Stafford as successive editors - and launched with a first issue, with Mick Jagger on the cover, on 8 March 1975.

Under O'Grady, who at first virtually wrote the magazine single-handedly under a variety of pseudonyms – his then-girlfriend Annie Beaumont taking the photos – RAM charted the transition of the Australian music scene from the Countdown era, with its teenybopper battles between Sherbet and Skyhooks, to the emergence, in the latter 70s, of the fabled pub circuit with its figureheads like Cold Chisel, Midnight Oil and the Angels. Recruiting writers like Jenny then-Hunter/later-Jewel Brown, Glenn A. Baker and Annie Burton plus an older hand like Vince Lovegrove, the magazine was starting to reach a significant audience, and reach O'Grady's objective of putting Australian rock journalism on a par with its counterpart overseas.

The late-70s' punk uprising that took place as readily in Australia as it did elsewhere around the world was a challenge for RAM, but one that O'Grady, with his personal championship of Radio Birdman, managed to meet quite successfully. Additionally bringing in new younger writers like, progressively, Andrew McMillan, Jodie 'J.J.' Adams, Stuart Coupe, Richard Guilliatt, Samantha Trenoweth and Clinton Walker, RAM integrated the new wave alongside its coverage of the mainstream, and this gave it another edge over its competitors like Juke and Australian Rolling Stone, who were slower on the uptake.

By 1980, after having started out in a terrace house in Paddington and then moved to another terrace in Glebe, RAM had taken over a building on Crown St. in the heart of Darlinghurst, and so successful was the burgeoning little media empire overseen by Philip Mason and his partner Barry Stewart – called Soundtracks – that it had bought up the surfing magazine Tracks and launched a fashion magazine called Ragtimes too. Like RAM, Tracks was the leader in its field, and the pair were trailed by Ragtimes, which Mason had created as a plaything for his wife, Alexandra Joel.

In May 1980, Soundtracks sold RAM to Eastern Suburbs Newspapers, thus beginning O'Gradys slow exit from the magazine. (Mason-Stewart would go on to long publish Australian editions of Playboy and Smash Hits.) Greg Taylor, a musician as well as a journalist (sax player with Jimmy and the Boys), meantime served an apprenticeship as assistant editor under O'Grady. New writers like Kent Goddard, Miranda Brown (Jenny's younger sister) and Elly McDonald were blooded. In late 1981, O'Grady finally, formally left his creation and Greg Taylor took over the editorship. O'Grady went on to work successfully in print, film, TV and radio, founding the influential tipsheet The Music Network in 1994; he died in 2018. RAM left Darlinghurst to move into new corporate headquarters in central Sydney; Eastern Suburbs Newspapers was a division of Fairfax, the media empire that owned the Sydney Morning Herald and Melbourne's Age, meaning that ironically RAM was now owned by the same company that also owned its principal rival Juke.

RAM and the corporate world was not, unsurprisingly, a good fit – no longer were there joints before lunchtime, or at any time for that matter – but still the magazine continued to thrive. The early 80s was a very real golden age for Australian music, in terms of both numbers that reached heights that would never be repeated and quality that was consistently spread across a wide base, and RAM was the chief chronicler of the period, despite increasing competition from the now-monthly and ever more localized Rolling Stone finally making up some ground. Juke's reach was never much beyond its base in Melbourne, and start-ups like Roadrunner and Vox had already folded.

Writers like Jenny Brown, Andrew McMillan and Stuart Coupe continued to occasionally contribute to the magazine but less so as they went in different directions, Coupe to edit TAGG magazine and manage bands like the Hoodoo Gurus and Paul Kelly and the Coloured Girls, Brown to work for Mushroom Music, and McMillan to move to Darwin to live and work; McMillan died in 2012. Greg Taylor bought in Phil Stafford as assistant editor, and when Clinton Walker left Australia to go and work overseas in 1982, two new young guns, Frank Brunetti and Mark Mordue, came in to fill the gap specializing in the 'inner city sound', to use the term Walker had coined for his recently published first book about the post-punk indy underground that was becoming a growing market sector. Photographers Phillip Morris, Bob King, Linda Nolte, Francine McDougall and later Ian Greene, Tom Takacs and long-serving Art Director Garry Fletcher, gave the magazine its visual signature. Toby Creswell, who up to this time had also occasionally contributed to the magazine, now shifted over to concentrate on Rolling Stone, and it was his subsequent editorship (and ownership) of the local Stone franchise that redoubled its challenge to RAM.

By 1984, with many other new writers like Marie Ryan and Virginia Moncrieff joining the roster of freelancers, Phil Stafford had bought the magazine, taken over as editor, and moved it back to its spiritual home in Darlinghurst. There, with Stafford's family by his side - his wife Jacqui and brother Chris, who drew brilliant cartoons for the magazine as well as associate-editing - RAM found a new lease on life. Clinton Walker returned to the fold, making for a formidable front-line alongside Frank Brunetti and Mark Mordue, at least until Brunetti drifted away to concentrate on his band the Died Pretty, and Mordue went off to edit Stiletto and then Australian Style. But new waves of writers continued to come through, including Wanda Jamrozik, Jon Casimir, Mark Demetrius, Bernard Zuel, Jack Marx, Paul Toohey, Craig N. Pearce, Lynden Barber, Tim McGee, Pat Sheil, Ignatius Jones, John Encarnacao, Brent Clough, Mara Smarelli and others. RAM even acquired a designated American correspondent, the LA-based Cary Darling. The difference now was that proto-'alternative' acts like Nick Cave or the GoBetweens could make the cover; although it's almost certain that when would-be stadium rockers like, say, Jimmy Barnes or INXS, graced the cover, those issues sold better. But still the scene was sufficiently rich, even as the pub circuit was starting to shrink, that RAM was never caught short for content. The careers of so many iconic Australian acts were chronicled in the pages of RAM, whether Midnight Oil, the Angels, INXS, the Sunnyboys, the Church, Mental As Anything, Paul Kelly, the GoBetweens, Nick Cave, the Triffids, the Divinyls, Crowded House, Hunters & Collectors, the Hoodoo Gurus… the 80s were the great glory days of pub rock, and a RAM stringer always had his or her 'name on the door'.

In the end though, RAM was caught between a rock and hard place. On one hand, the rise of the free street press stole a lot of its advertising, and even without the writing firepower, papers like Sydney's On the Street, Melbourne's Beat, Brisbane's Time Off and Perth's X-Press stole a lot of its readers due to being weekly, free (of course), and offering comprehensive regionalised gig guides (something RAM could never quite manage, despite trying). On the other hand, the local monthly edition of Rolling Stone, now owned and edited by Toby Creswell, was no longer inky newsprint but a colour glossy, and was finally tapping into the Australian scene to as intimate an extent as RAM ever had - and now had the pool of writers to tell the stories.

Phil Stafford fought valiantly to keep RAM alive but its time had passed. After a quick succession of a couple more very short-lived editors, Stephen Cadbury and Paul Toohey, the magazine died a much-lamented if sadly timely death after its last issue in July 1989.

In 2012, Jenny Brown was the presenter of a radio documentary, Paper Trail, which described her 'hack's progress' from the underground hippie press of the early 70s to RAM in the late 70s. Clinton Walker has also published online a personal history of the Australian music press in the era of ink, called Lowest of the Low, and it gives much coverage to RAM generally as well as his involvement with the magazine.

When Anthony O'Grady died just before Christmas in 2018, it prompted an outpouring of affection and admiration, and finally the tag that he himself so modestly resisted - the Godfather of Australian rock journalism - could be applied and would stick.
