= You Got Nothing I Want =

Single by Cold Chisel

from the album Circus Animals
- B-side: "Numbers Fall"
- Released: November 1981
- Recorded: 1981
- Genre: Hard rock
- Label: WEA
- Songwriter(s): Jimmy Barnes
- Producer(s): Mark Opitz

Cold Chisel singles chronology
"Knockin' on Heaven's Door" (1981)	"You Got Nothing I Want" (1981)	"Forever Now" (1982)

"You Got Nothing I Want" is a 1981 single from Australian rock band Cold Chisel, the first released from the album Circus Animals. One of the band's heaviest and most aggressive songs, which was written by singer Jimmy Barnes in response to the treatment they received at the hands of a record company executive during a U.S. tour earlier in the year. Don Walker said, "After we came back, Jim wrote 'You Got Nothing I Want' more or less as a personal tribute to Marty Schwartz." "You Got Nothing I Want" was also the first song on the album, and representative of the different sound Cold Chisel was attempting on Circus Animals in a conscious effort to move away from the slick commercial pop rock of East. It spent 19 weeks in the national charts, peaking at number 12.

Producer Opitz said, "Musically, 'You Got Nothing I Want' was inspired by the Rolling Stones' 'Start Me Up'. The Stones' 'Tattoo You' was Australia's number one album when we entered the studio and Mossy would tune up by playing the riff. I'm sure if you put the start of 'Start Me Up' at the start of 'You Got Nothing I Want', it would work perfectly."

Barnes (front) and Pretswich in the music video

A video clip was made for the song. Directed by Peter Cox, who had previously directed the "Cheap Wine" video, it featured the band miming in the wooden-floored Paddington Town Hall.

On the 2007 tribute album Standing on the Outside: The Songs of Cold Chisel, "You Got Nothing I Want" was covered by Alex Lloyd.

== Reception ==
Allmusic described Barnes' vocals as sounding like, "a buzz saw blade that's flown loose and ripped through a bunch of parked cars. The boys come crashing in through the window like a bunch of rowdies with hell-raising on their minds, cranking out the guitar rock rottweiler."

New Zealand music magazine Rip It up described the song as, "a crunching rocker, and one wonders why he's contributed so few songs to their repertoire".

Andrew McMillan wrote in RAM, the song was, "complete with single camera clip and appropriately brutal delivery. Without compromising their own concept of a rock'n'roll band, they spat at the acknowledged life-support system with defiance."

== Charts ==
=== Weekly charts ===
Weekly chart performance for "You Got Nothing I Want"
Chart (1981/82)	Peak position
Australia (Kent Music Report))	12

=== Year-end charts ===
Year-end chart performance for "You Got Nothing I Want"
Chart (1982)	Position
Australia (Kent Music Report)	94
