= Forever Now (Cold Chisel song) =

1982 single by Cold Chisel

Single by Cold Chisel

from the album Circus Animals
- B-side: "Bow River"
- Released: 8 March 1982
- Studio: Paradise, Studios 301 (Sydney)
- Length: 4:24
- Label: WEA
- Songwriter: Steve Prestwich
- Producer: Mark Opitz

Cold Chisel singles chronology
"You Got Nothing I Want" (1981)	"Forever Now" (1982)	"When the War Is Over" (1982)

Music video
- "Forever Now" on YouTube

"Forever Now" is a song by Australian rock band Cold Chisel. The second single from the album Circus Animals, it was the first Cold Chisel single to be written by Steve Prestwich. The song reached number two in New Zealand and number four in Australia, becoming the band's highest chart placement. In the United States, the song was titled "Forever Now (All My Love)".

== Details ==
Prestwich, who could only play drums at the time of recording, had to hum the melody to the rest of the band. Producer Opitz said, "The first time Chisel played 'Forever Now' on stage, it was a seven-minute version at Parramatta Leagues Club and I was blown away. I rushed to the dressing room and told the band, 'We've got the single!'" At the time it had the working title "Acapulco Piranha". Walker said, "'Forever Now' was a jammy idea that we were doing at gigs and doing at sound-checks and developing. Mark Opitz recognized very early on that this song has the ideas to be a single and be a very important song for us."

Prestwich later commented, "Mark was very happy and so was I. I'd always felt I had the ability. My biggest hurdle was to be unselfconscious about writing." Prestwich further felt that the "very melodic" song balanced out some of the rock songs on Circus Animals.

Main songwriter Don Walker said at the time, "The songs that the other guys are writing are getting so good these days, you know, like Steve has written a couple of excellent songs for radio, while this time none of mine were suitable for singles or anything like that."

After the release of the single, Walker said, "Steve was drunk in the studio one night and was explaining that "Forever Now" is meant to be read on several different levels. But as far as knowing what those levels are and where they're leading, I haven't sat down with him sober and got right into it."

Prestwich "drums" on the table

Artists to record covers of "Forever Now" include Pete Murray, The Delltones and Perfect Tripod (a collaboration between Tripod and Eddie Perfect). A version by the Reels reached 135 in the Australian charts.

The song was later used in the 2000 Australian movie Chopper.

== Promo video ==
A video clip was made to promote the song, directed by Mark Lewis. It featured the band sitting at a table, with Barnes miming & Prestwich pretending to play drums on various objects on the table. It was actually shot in the Four in Hand bar in Paddington with a few modifications to make it appear like an airport departure lounge.

== Charts ==
=== Weekly charts ===
Chart (1982)	Peak position
Australia (Kent Music Report)	4
New Zealand (Recorded Music NZ)	2

=== Year-end charts ===
Chart (1982)	Position
Australia (Kent Music Report)	35
New Zealand (RIANZ)	12

== Certifications ==
Certifications for "Forever Now"
Region	Certification	Certified units/sales
New Zealand (RMNZ)	2× Platinum	60,000^{‡}
^{‡} Sales+streaming figures based on certification alone.
