= My Baby (Cold Chisel song) =

Single by Cold Chisel

from the album East
- B-side: "Misfits"
- Released: August 1980
- Recorded: 1980
- Genre: Pop
- Label: WEA
- Songwriter: Phil Small
- Producer: Mark Opitz

Cold Chisel singles chronology
| "Cheap Wine" (1980) | "My Baby" (1980) | "Knockin' on Heaven's Door" (1981) |

"My Baby" is a 1980 single from Australian rock band Cold Chisel, the third released from the album East and the first of the band's singles not to be written by pianist Don Walker. This was the only track credited solely to bass player Phil Small on any of the band's albums apart from "Notion For You" on the 1994 rarities album Teenage Love (Small co-wrote "The Game" from Twentieth Century with Walker).

The song proved to be one of the band's most popular, featuring a clearly defined pop sound quite different from Cold Chisel's more usual hard-edged rock. Guitarist Ian Moss provides lead vocals and Joe Camilleri of Jo Jo Zep & The Falcons contributed a saxophone solo. While "My Baby" was the third single released from East in Australia, in the U.S. it was the first. Promotional copies sent to radio stations there were wrapped in a baby's nappy as a marketing gimmick. It was the only Cold Chisel single to chart in America, reaching 32 on the Mainstream Rock chart. It spent 14 weeks in the Australian charts, peaking at number 40.

Author Phil Small said, "I was in the bathroom at Paradise Studios when the idea came to me. Luckily, being in the studio, we were able to whack the idea down on tape pretty much straight away. Everyone seems to think it's written about Christine, my wife; maybe subconsciously it is." Moss adds, "It was all in Phil's head; we just needed to get it down. He didn't even know the chords – he just played it on the bass and I picked it up from there." Walker said, "Between learning the song and having the finished record might have been a couple of hours' work."

Walker later said, "It's numbing to play "My Baby" for the 654th time. Not because it's worse than the others, but because there's only one way of playing it that works, whereas a song like "Taipan" you can do just about anything you like and it won't fall apart."

The single's b-side, "Misfits", was, at the time of release, a non-album track. It subsequently appeared on 1991's Chisel compilation, and as a (CD) single in its own right. However, the 1980 b-side version remains unique in that it includes Steve Prestwich's count-in, trimmed from subsequent reissues.

On the 2007 tribute album Standing on the Outside: The Songs of Cold Chisel, "My Baby" was covered by Thirsty Merc.

== Reception ==
Anwen Crawford, writing for The Monthly said the song, "sounds like a Smokey Robinson song re-figured for a rock band instead of a Motown vocal group."

RAM called it, "a steady cruising, sunny love song. Simple changes given a lift by the poignant sax of Joe Camilleri."

== Charts ==
| Chart (1980) | Peak position |
|---|---|
| Australia (Kent Music Report) | 40 |

== Certifications ==
Certifications for "My Baby"
| Region | Certification | Certified units/sales |
|---|---|---|
| New Zealand (RMNZ) | Gold | 15,000^{‡} |
^{‡} Sales+streaming figures based on certification alone.
