= Goodbye (Astrid Goodbye) =

Single by Cold Chisel

from the album Breakfast at Sweethearts
- B-side: "Georgia on My Mind"
- Released: 11 September 1978
- Recorded: 1978, Albert Studios, Sydney
- Genre: Rock
- Label: WEA
- Songwriter(s): Don Walker; Jimmy Barnes
- Producer(s): Richard Batchens

Cold Chisel singles chronology
| "Khe Sanh" (1978) | "Goodbye (Astrid Goodbye)" (1978) | "Breakfast at Sweethearts" (1979) |

"Goodbye (Astrid Goodbye)" is a 1978 single from Australian rock band Cold Chisel. Written by keyboardist Don Walker and vocalist Jimmy Barnes, it was released as a single in 1978, peaking at number 65 on the Australian charts. It appeared as a track on the 1979 album Breakfast at Sweethearts.

== Details ==
The single, "Goodbye (Astrid Goodbye)" preceded the album Breakfast at Sweethearts by some months, and was recorded when demos were being done for the album. The single is markedly different from the later album version, with a doubled guitar riff and a less prominent piano.

A fast-paced rocker, lyricist Walker said the song was written because the band, "needed a set finisher." Described as, "the band's blazing showstopper," it was often played as the last song in concerts, and also on the live album Swingshift.

Lyrically, the song is written from the perspective of a husband leaving his wife. Opening with the lines, "Open up the door Astrid, cause I'm comin' down the stairs / And I ain't gonna listen to no more pissin' around", the three verses are all addressed to the wife. The lyrics were originally written for a completely different song that was sung by Ian Moss before being given to Barnes to write matching music. Walker later said he knew no-one named Astrid, and he had probably heard the name in relation to Bill Wyman's wife.

Although included in Cold Chisel's greatest hits collections, the single received little airplay at the time of release.

== Reception ==
Critic Toby Creswell described the song as a rudimentary 12-bar thrash. He said the song is, "full of wit and attitude. The Narrator lets fly his scorn for the woman's lifestyle. All the bottled-up anger spews out. Taking three chords and a simple story and transforming them into a unique and confronting piece like this takes real genius."

Reviewed at the time of release, Roadrunner said, "Radio play is the chief objective of Cold Chisel's "Goodbye". It's a good, basic rock song with great vocals. The flip, a version of the old Hoagy Carmichael standard is just superb."

== Charts ==
| Chart (1978) | Peak position |
|---|---|
| Australia (Kent Music Report) | 65 |
