= Cheap Wine (song) =

1980 single by Cold Chisel

Single by Cold Chisel

from the album East
- B-side: "Rising Sun"
- Released: 9 May 1980
- Recorded: March–April 1980, Paradise Studios, Sydney
- Genre: Pub rock; pop
- Length: 3:27
- Label: WEA
- Songwriter: Don Walker
- Producer: Mark Opitz

Cold Chisel singles chronology
"Choirgirl" (1979)	"Cheap Wine" (1980)	"My Baby" (1980)

"Cheap Wine" is a 1980 single from Australian rock band Cold Chisel. The second single from the album East, it was released in May, a month before the album. It reached number 8 on the Australian charts, the band's first top-ten single, and would eventually remain the band's second highest chart performance. It has been described as, "one of Don's finest commercial songs."

== Details ==
The song first appeared in live sets in April 1980, and was recorded in one or two takes with no demo. Lyrically, its theme is, "the small pleasures of drinking for greater freedom". Author Walker said, "It's about someone who's on the drinks, but still having a great time. I can relate to that - in the seven years Cold Chisel have been together, we've only had enough money to drink the last two and a half. If you get into that lifestyle and start to enjoy it, you tend to stay that way even when the money comes in."

Producer Opitz said, "Cheap Wine" was obviously written as a single, something to follow "Choirgirl". If you listen to it, it has many of the same structural elements - where the chorus falls, where the bridge falls, where the backing vocals come in. And that was no accident." Moss said that he may initially have thought the song was too commercial, but the chord progressions were enough to stop it from being too poppy.

Barnes (front) flanked by Walker and Moss, in the music video

Composer Don Walker said the song was, "a cobbled together song. The two verses were from two different ideas and the chorus came in quite late, and a middle bit from somewhere else. From memory, this was bolted together on the day, in the frenzy of writing and the euphoria of the first few days at Paradise Studios recording East."

A promotional video was shot for the song, featuring Barnes walking around an apartment, getting dressed, and taking his oversize three litre bottle of Coca Cola out of his fridge. Shot by Peter Cox, it shows footage of a cockfight in one scene. It was filmed at Roger Langford's apartment in Elizabeth Bay on 10 and 11 April, where the cover for East had been shot. Barnes wore a T-shirt depicting a woman drinking Coca Cola, with the logo, "Coke - The Real Thing".

The B-side was Barnes' first solo song-writing credit, "Rising Sun". A rockabilly song, it was inspired by Barnes' then-girlfriend, Jane, travelling to Japan.

== Reception ==
"Cheap Wine"

The single was picked up by a number of commercial radio stations when released.

Reviewed in RAM at the time of release, it was described as, "another excellent song from Mr Walker, a stunning vocal performance from Jimmy Barnes." The reviewer does note that, "this track may not please some of the die hard head-bashers, but will certainly broaden their appeal via the airwaves."

Rolling Stone Australia called "Cheap Wine", "a wonderful song with a soulful verse and a boogie chorus which sounds momentarily like early Faces." RAM said, "All of Cold Chisel's abilities and image fused into superb rock song. The lovely verse melody over rolling piano, solid chugging chords, one of the best bridges since Dragon's "April Sun in Cuba"... and lyrics for anyone who has looked back through a wine glass darkly."

In January 2018, as part of Triple M's "Ozzest 100", the 'most Australian' songs of all time, "Cheap Wine" was ranked number 41.

== Charts ==
=== Weekly charts ===
Chart (1980)	Peak position
Australia (Kent Music Report)	8

=== Year-end charts ===
Chart (1980)	Position
Australia (Kent Music Report)	69

== Certifications ==
Certifications for "Cheap Wine"
Region	Certification	Certified units/sales
New Zealand (RMNZ)	Platinum	30,000^{‡}
^{‡} Sales+streaming figures based on certification alone.
