= Breakfast at Sweethearts (song) =

Single by Cold Chisel

from the album Breakfast at Sweethearts
- B-side: "Plaza"
- Released: March 1979
- Recorded: July 1978 – January 1979, Albert Studios, Sydney
- Genre: Reggae
- Label: WEA
- Songwriter: Don Walker
- Producer: Richard Batchens

Cold Chisel singles chronology
"Goodbye (Astrid Goodbye)" (1978)	"Breakfast at Sweethearts" (1979)	"Shipping Steel" (1979)

"Breakfast at Sweethearts" is a song from Australian rock band Cold Chisel. Written by keyboardist Don Walker, it was released as a single in 1979, peaking at number 63 on the Australian charts. It appeared as a track on the album of the same name.

== Details ==
"Sweethearts" was a cafè in the middle of Kings Cross, Sydney in the 1970s and 1980s, "cramped between strip clubs and sex shops, patronised by the hookers, pimps and drug dealers and the lost and lonely debris of the night," where author Don Walker would frequently eat. He said, "The original Sweethearts Cafe is where McDonald's is now. That got demolished and Sweethearts moved over the road to where Krave Espresso Bar is now. That lasted for quite a few years, until the late 1980s, early '90s." Walker continued to live in Kings Cross for decades afterwards, and often wrote about the area. Author Louis Nowra said the song was, "the most immediately identifiable song about the Cross." Elsewhere, it was noted the song, "wasn't a cliched, red-light story of the night, it painted Kings Cross in its morning-time, aftermath rhythms."

Elsewhere, Walker said the establishment was very small and run by a Yugoslavian family. "It had the reputation that when Nureyev was in Sydney, he would always have his coffee at Sweethearts and stuff like that. There was a beautiful middle-aged woman who used to serve coffee there and never said anything and she was reputed to be the girlfriend of quite a dangerous guy," he claimed.

The song first appeared in performances in 1978, after the chorus was written on an organ while recording demos for the album.

== Charts ==
Chart (1979)	Peak position
Australia (Kent Music Report)	68
