= Australian Idol season 1 =

Australian Idol
- Season 1
- Hosted by: Andrew G James Mathison
- Judges: Ian "Dicko" Dickson; Marcia Hines; Mark Holden
- Winner: Guy Sebastian
- Runner-up: Shannon Noll
- Finals venue: Sydney Opera House

Release
- Original network: Network Ten
- Original release: 27 July – 19 November 2003

Season chronology
- Next → Season 2

The first season of Australian Idol was produced by Fremantle Media subsidiary Grundy Television in association with UK company 19TV, and was broadcast on Network Ten for 19 weeks in the latter half of 2003. The judges were Mark Holden, Marcia Hines and Ian "Dicko" Dickson.

== Overview ==
When Network Ten paid $15 million for the first season of Australian Idol they anticipated it to be a critical and financial success, like it had been in other countries such as the UK and the USA. When the show aired for the first time in August 2003 it was very successful, attracting a diverse ranges of viewers. The audition process went through several major cities in Australia including Sydney, Melbourne, Perth, Adelaide and Darwin. Towards the end of its run, Australian Idol became the most popular TV show in the country with more ratings than major events such as the AFL Grand Final. The Grand Final at the Sydney Opera House attracted more than 3 million viewers.

The winner of the competition was Guy Sebastian. He beat Shannon Noll who finished in 2nd place, Cosima De Vito who came in 3rd place, Paulini Curuenavuli who came in 4th place & Rob Mills who finished in 5th place. After Idol, it was these five, the Final 5, who were the most successful out of the Top 12.

Other Idol contestants from Season 1 to release music were Rebekah LaVauney, Peter Ryan and Courtney Act. Probably the biggest single from a non finalist was released by Rhett Butler a cover of R Kelly's She's Got That Vibe which went top 20 in Australia.

In the third semi final, just before the live verdict, one of the contestants, Anthony Sumbati, was disqualified for taking part in a radio interview without the consent of the producers. He later performed in the Grand Final as one of the performances outside the Sydney Opera House.

In the wildcard show, a contestant named Daniel Wakefield was originally meant to be in the top 12, but due to his contract, he wasn't able to be in the top 12. Instead of having one contestant chosen by the judges and the other chosen by Australia, three contestants were chosen, two by Australia and one by the judges.

== Finals ==
=== Finalists ===
Finalist	Age *	From	Status
Daniel Wakefield	20	Sydney	Disqualified in Week 1
Mathew Chadwick	20	Gold Coast	Eliminated 1st in Week 1
Peter Ryan	27	Tabulam	Eliminated 2nd in Week 1
Cle Wootton	22	Perth	Eliminated 3rd in Week 2
Lauren Buckley	17	East Gosford	Eliminated 4th in Week 2
Kelly Cavuoto	22	Adelaide	Eliminated 5th in Week 3
Rebekah LaVauney	25	Liverpool	Eliminated 6th in Week 3
Levi Kereama	19	Brisbane	Eliminated 7th in Week 4
Rob Mills	21	Melbourne	Eliminated 8th in Week 5
Paulini Curuenavuli	20	Wiley Park	Eliminated 9th in Week 6
Cosima De Vito	26	Perth	Withdrew in Week 7
Shannon Noll	27	Condobolin	Runner-up
Guy Sebastian	21	Paradise	Winner

* as of the start of the season

=== Live show details ===
==== Heat 1 (10 August 2003) ====
Order	Artist	Song (original artists)	Result
1	Chelsea Gibson	"Beautiful" (Christina Aguilera)	Eliminated
2	Shannon Thompson	"Lately" (Stevie Wonder)	Eliminated
3	Natalie Ferguson	"Son of a Preacher Man" (Dusty Springfield)	Eliminated
4	Lorena Alegria	"To Zion" (Lauryn Hill)	Eliminated
5	Daniel Wakefield	"You'll Never Walk Alone" (Christine Johnson)	Advanced
6	Veronica Stewart	"I Want to Know What Love Is" (Foreigner)	Eliminated
7	Peter Ryan	"Right Here Waiting" (Richard Marx)	Advanced
8	Eli Diache	"Angel" (Sarah McLachlan)	Eliminated

Notes

- Daniel Wakefield and Peter Ryan advanced to the top 12 of the competition. The other 6 contestants were eliminated.
- Eli Diache returned for a second chance at the top 12 in the Wildcard Round.

==== Heat 2 (17 August 2003) ====
Order	Artist	Song (original artists)	Result
1	Cosima De Vito	"My Heart Will Go On" (Celine Dion)	Eliminated
2	Marc Stockley	"Let it Be" (The Beatles)	Eliminated
3	Hailey Cramer	"Run to You" (Whitney Houston)	Eliminated
4	Sidney Maynard	"Ribbon in the Sky" (Stevie Wonder)	Eliminated
5	Rebecca Tapia	"Shadowland" (Heather Headley)	Eliminated
6	Axle Whitehead	"Pastime Paradise" (Stevie Wonder)	Eliminated
7	Kelly Cavuoto	"Bring Me to Life" (Evanescence)	Advanced
8	Mathew Chadwick	"Truly" (Lionel Richie)	Advanced

Notes

- Mathew Chadwick and Kelly Cavuoto advanced to the top 12 of the competition. The other 6 contestants were eliminated.
- Cosima DeVito, Rebecca Tapia and Axle Whithead returned for a second chance at the top 12 in the Wildcard Round.

==== Heat 3 (24 August 2003) ====
Order	Artist	Song (original artists)	Result
1	Jennifer Pearl	"The Day You Went Away" (Wendy Matthews)	Eliminated
2	Ryan Sheppard	"Swear It Again" (Westlife)	Eliminated
3	Martine Robert	"The First Time Ever I Saw Your Face" (Roberta Flack)	Eliminated
4	Anthony Sumbati	"The More I See You" (Michael Bublé)	Eliminated
5	Rebekah LaVauney	"Ex-Factor" (Lauryn Hill)	Eliminated
6	Shannon Noll	"Better Man" (Robbie Williams)	Advanced
7	Yolande Jackson	"Winter" (Tori Amos)	Eliminated
8	Guy Sebastian	"What a Wonderful World" (Louis Armstrong)	Advanced

Notes

- Guy Sebastian and Shannon Noll advanced to the top 12 of the competition. The other 6 contestants were eliminated.
- Rebekah LaVauney and Yolande Jackson returned for a second chance at the top 12 in the Wildcard Round.

==== Heat 4 (31 August 2003) ====
Order	Artist	Song (original artists)	Result
1	Mary Lane	"Holding Out for a Hero" (Bonnie Tyler)	Eliminated
2	Michelle Cashman	"My Heart Will Go On" (Celine Dion)	Eliminated
3	Costa Zacharia	"Whenever You Call" (Mariah Carey)	Eliminated
4	Brielle Davis	"Even God Must Get the Blues" (Jo Dee Messina)	Eliminated
5	Levi Kereama	"Nice and Slow" (Usher)	Eliminated
6	Cle Wootton	"Come to Me" (Diesel)	Advanced
7	Brandon Burns	"Better Man" (Robbie Williams)	Eliminated
8	Lauren Buckley	"Imagine" (John Lennon)	Advanced

Notes

- Cle Wootton and Lauren Buckley advanced to the top 12 of the competition. The other 6 contestants were eliminated.
- Levi Kereama returned for a second chance at the top 12 in the Wildcard Round.

==== Heat 5 (7 September 2003) ====
Order	Artist	Song (original artists)	Result
1	Marcus Jones	"Burn for You" (John Farnham)	Eliminated
2	Ben Manusama	"Hard to Say I'm Sorry" (Chicago)	Eliminated
3	Alex Longstaff	"Even When I'm Sleeping" (Leonardo's Bride)	Eliminated
4	Anton Aktila	"End of the Road" (Boyz II Men)	Eliminated
5	Stu Campbell	"Guilty" (Jimmy Barnes)	Eliminated
6	Paulini Curuenavuli	"Somewhere" (Reri Grist)	Advanced
7	Courtney Act	"You Don't Own Me" (Lesley Gore)	Eliminated
8	Rob Mills	"Angels" (Robbie Williams)	Advanced

Notes

- Paulini Curuenavuli and Rob Mills advanced to the top 12 of the competition. The other 6 contestants were eliminated.
- Stu Campbell and Courtney Act returned for a second chance at the top 12 in the Wildcard Round.

==== Wildcard round (14 September 2003) ====
Order	Artist	Song (original artists)	Result
1	Eli Diache	"Permission to Shine" (6cyclemind)	Eliminated
2	Stu Campbell	"(I Could Only) Whisper Your Name" (Harry Connick, Jr.)	Eliminated
3	Yolande Jackson	"Stuck" (Stacie Orrico)	Eliminated
4	Liban Aden	"Where I Wanna Be" (Donell Jones)	Eliminated
5	Rebekah LaVauney	"Exhale (Shoop Shoop)" (Whitney Houston)	Advanced
6	Courtney Act	"You Shook Me All Night Long" (AC/DC)	Eliminated
7	Axle Whitehead	"Yesterday" (The Beatles)	Eliminated
8	Cosima De Vito	"Predictable" (Delta Goodrem)	Advanced
9	Levi Kereama	"Maria Maria" (Santana)	Advanced
10	Rebecca Tapia	"Let's Get Loud" (Jennifer Lopez)	Eliminated

Notes

- The judges selected Cosima De Vito to move on into the top 12 of the competition, before the hosts revealed the top 3 vote getters. Rebekah LaVauney and Levi Kereama received the most votes, and completed the top 12.

==== Live Show 1 (21 September 2003) ====
Theme: The 70s

Order	Artist	Song (original artists)	Result
N/A	Daniel Wakefield	N/A	Disqualified
1	Levi Kereama	"Superstition" (Stevie Wonder)	Safe
2	Lauren Buckley	"Moondance" (Van Morrison)	Safe
3	Mathew Chadwick	"If" (Bread)	Eliminated
4	Rebekah LaVauney	"Emotion" (Samantha Sang)	Safe
5	Rob Mills	"All Right Now" (Free)	Safe
6	Cosima De Vito	"Hot Stuff" (Donna Summer)	Safe
7	Peter Ryan	"Your Song" (Elton John)	Eliminated
8	Cle Wootton	"Young Hearts Run Free" (Candi Staton)	Safe
9	Guy Sebastian	"The Love You Save" (The Jackson 5)	Safe
10	Kelly Cavuoto	"Whole Lotta Love" (Led Zeppelin)	Bottom three
11	Shannon Noll	"Help Is on Its Way" (Little River Band)	Safe
12	Paulini Curuenavuli	"Don't Leave Me This Way" (Thelma Houston)	Safe

==== Live Show 2 (28 September 2003) ====
Theme: Australian #1s

Order	Artist	Song (original artists)	Result
1	Cosima De Vito	"I Wanna Dance with Somebody (Who Loves Me)" (Whitney Houston)	Safe
2	Rob Mills	"You Don't Treat Me No Good" (Sonia Dada)	Safe
3	Paulini Curuenavuli	"Eternal Flame" (The Bangles)	Safe
4	Lauren Buckley	"Lady Marmalade" (Christina Aguilera, Pink, Lil' Kim & Mýa)	Eliminated
5	Guy Sebastian	"(Everything I Do) I Do It for You" (Bryan Adams)	Safe
6	Kelly Cavuoto	"Tomorrow" (Silverchair)	Bottom three
7	Shannon Noll	"What About Me" (Moving Pictures)	Safe
8	Rebekah LaVauney	"Killing Me Softly with His Song" (The Fugees)	Safe
9	Cle Wootton	"That's the Way Love Goes" (Janet Jackson)	Eliminated
10	Levi Kereama	"Rock Your Body" (Justin Timberlake)	Safe

==== Live Show 3 (5 October 2003) ====
Theme: Australian Made

Order	Artist	Song (original artists)	Result
1	Kelly Cavuoto	"Mascara" (Killing Heidi)	Eliminated
2	Shannon Noll	"Already Gone" (Powderfinger)	Safe
3	Rebekah LaVauney	"Heading In The Right Direction" (Renee Geyer)	Eliminated
4	Levi Kereama	"To the Moon and Back" (Savage Garden)	Bottom three
5	Paulini Curuenavuli	"Chains" (Tina Arena)	Safe
6	Rob Mills	"Take Me Back" (Noiseworks)	Safe
7	Cosima De Vito	"When the War Is Over" (Cold Chisel)	Safe
8	Guy Sebastian	"You're the Voice" (John Farnham)	Safe

==== Live Show 4 (12 October 2003) ====
Theme: The 80s

Order	Artist	Song (original artists)	Result
1	Shannon Noll	"Livin' on a Prayer" (Bon Jovi)	Bottom three
2	Paulini Curuenavuli	"Freeway of Love" (Aretha Franklin)	Bottom two
3	Levi Kereama	"Every Little Step" (Bobby Brown)	Eliminated
4	Cosima DeVito	"What's Love Got To Do With It" (Tina Turner)	Safe
5	Rob Mills	"If I Could" (1927)	Safe
6	Guy Sebastian	"When Doves Cry" (Prince)	Safe

==== Up, Close and Personal Special (14 October 2003) ====
Artist	Song (original artists)
Cosima De Vito	"Hero" (Mariah Carey)
Guy Sebastian	"When I Get You Alone" (Robin Thicke)
Paulini Curuenavuli	"Fields of Gold" (Sting)
Rob Mills	"When You Say Nothing at All" (Ronan Keating)
Shannon Noll	"With or Without You" (U2)

==== Live Show 5 (19 October 2003) ====
Theme: R&B & Soul

Order	Artist	First song (original artists)	Second song	Result
1	Shannon Noll	When a Man Loves a Woman" (Percy Sledge)	"(Your Love Keeps Lifting Me) Higher and Higher" (Jackie Wilson)	Safe
2	Paulini Curuenavuli	"Un-Break My Heart" (Toni Braxton)	"Survivor" (Destiny's Child)	Safe
3	Guy Sebastian	"Hello" (Lionel Richie)	"Hidden Agenda" (Craig David)	Safe
4	Cosima De Vito	"Respect" (Aretha Franklin)	"I Believe I Can Fly" (R. Kelly)	Bottom two
5	Rob Mills	"Too Close" (Next)	"If I Could Turn Back the Hands of Time" (R. Kelly)	Eliminated

==== Live Show 6 (26 October 2003) ====
Theme: Big Band

Order	Artist	First song (original artists)	Second song	Result
1	Shannon Noll	"New York, New York (Frank Sinatra)	"I've Got You Under My Skin" (Frank Sinatra)	Safe
2	Paulini Curuenavuli	"At Last" (Etta James)	"Almost Like Being in Love" (Frank Sinatra)	Eliminated
3	Cosima De Vito	"L-O-V-E" (Nat King Cole)	"Smile" (Nat King Cole)	Safe
4	Guy Sebastian	"Hit the Road Jack" (Ray Charles)	"The Way You Look Tonight" (Frank Sinatra)	Bottom two

==== Live Show 7: Semi-final (2 November 2003) ====
Theme: The 60s

Order	Artist	First song (original artists)	Second song	Result
1	Shannon Noll	"One" (Harry Nilsson)	"Hey Jude" (The Beatles)	Safe
2	Guy Sebastian	"Can't Take My Eyes off You" (Frankie Valli)	"Climb Ev'ry Mountain" (Patricia Neway)	Safe
3	Cosima De Vito	"You Don't Have to Say You Love Me" (Dusty Springfield)	" River Deep, Mountain High" (Tina Turner)	Withdrew

==== Live final (16 November 2003) ====
Order	Artist	First song (original artists)	Second song	Third song	Result
1	Shannon Noll	"Please Forgive Me"	"Working Class Man"	"Angels Brought Me Here"	Runner-up
2	Guy Sebastian	"I'll Be There"	"Crazy in Love"	"Angels Brought Me Here"	Winner

== The Top 12 Contestants ==
=== Guy Sebastian ===
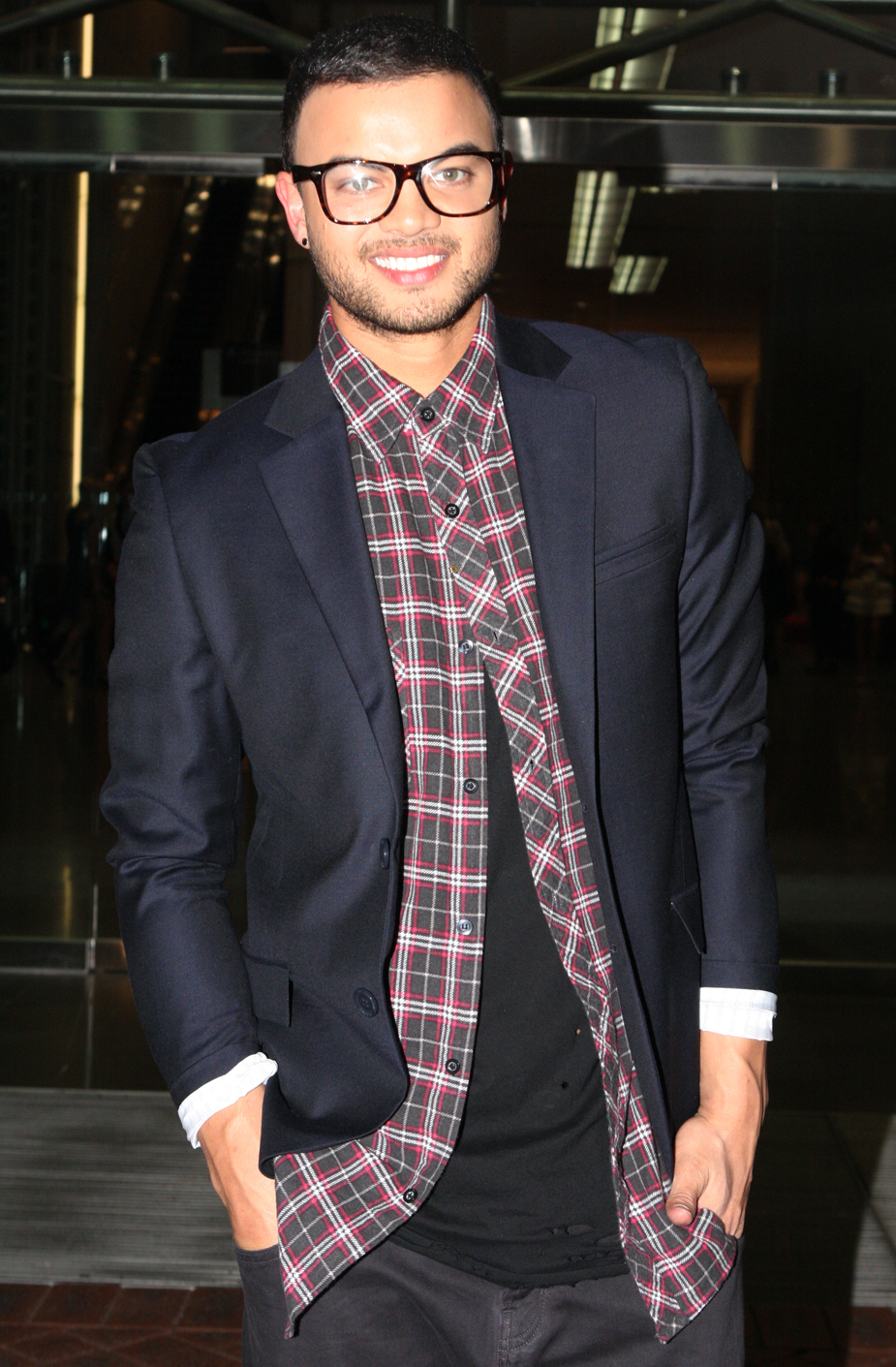
Guy Sebastian

Guy Sebastian was the winner of the first series of Australian Idol.

Sebastian's performances on Australian Idol:

Audition: "Ribbon in the Sky" (Stevie Wonder)
Theatre Week (Round 1): "Back at One" (Brian McKnight)
Theatre Week (Round 3): "Somewhere Over the Rainbow" (Judy Garland)
Top 40: "What a Wonderful World" (Louis Armstrong)
Top 12: "The Love You Save" (Jackson Five)
Top 10: "(Everything I Do) I Do It for You" (Bryan Adams)
Top 8: "You're the Voice" (John Farnham)
Top 6: "When Doves Cry" (Prince)
Up, Close & Personal: "When I Get You Alone" (Robin Thicke)
Top 5: "Hidden Agenda" (Craig David), "Hello" (Lionel Richie)
Top 4: "The Way You Look Tonight" (Jerome Kern & Dorothy Fields), Hit the Road Jack" (Percy Mayfield)
Top 3: "Can't Take My Eyes off You" (Frankie Valli), "Climb Every Mountain" (Julie Andrews, from The Sound of Music) TOUCHDOWN
Top 2: "I'll Be There" (The Jackson 5), "Crazy in Love" (Beyoncé), "Angels Brought Me Here" (winner's single)

=== Shannon Noll ===
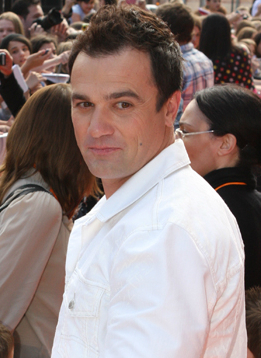
Shannon Noll

Shannon Noll (born 16 September 1975), was runner-up to winner Guy Sebastian.

Audition: "Hold Me in Your Arms" (Southern Sons)
Theatre Week (Round 1): "Hold Me in Your Arms" (Southern Sons)
Theatre Week (Round 3): "Burn for You" (John Farnham)
Top 40: "Better Man" (Robbie Williams)
Top 12: "Help Is on Its Way" (Little River Band)
Top 10: "What About Me" (Moving Pictures)
Top 8: "Already Gone" (Powderfinger)
Top 6: "Livin' on a Prayer" (Bon Jovi) Bottom 3
Up, Close & Personal: "With or Without You" (U2)
Top 5: "Higher and Higher" (Jackie Wilson), "When a Man Loves a Woman" (Percy Sledge)
Top 4: "I've Got You Under My Skin", "New York, New York (Frank Sinatra)
Top 3: "One" (Harry Nilsson), "Hey Jude" (The Beatles)
Top 2: "Please Forgive Me" (Bryan Adams), "Working Class Man" (Jimmy Barnes), "Angels Brought Me Here" (winner's single)

=== Cosima De Vito ===
Cosima De Vito (born 1 November 1976), came third in Australian Idol after withdrawing because of a sudden diagnosis of throat nodules.

Audition: "I Surrender" (Celine Dion)
Theatre Week (Round 1):
Theatre Week (Round 3): "Call the Man" (Celine Dion)
Top 40: "My Heart Will Go On" (Celine Dion)
Wildcard Show: "Predictable" (Delta Goodrem)
Top 12: "Hot Stuff" (Donna Summer)
Top 10: "I Wanna Dance With Somebody" (Whitney Houston)
Top 8: "When the War Is Over" (Cold Chisel) ~ TOUCHDOWN!
Top 6: "What's Love Got To Do With It" (Tina Turner)
Up, Close & Personal: "Hero" (Mariah Carey)
Top 5: "I Believe I Can Fly" (R. Kelly), "Respect" (Aretha Franklin) ~ TOUCHDOWN! Bottom 2
Top 4: "L-O-V-E" (Nat King Cole), "Smile" (Charlie Chaplin)
Top 3: "You Don't Have to Say You Love Me" (Dusty Springfield), "River Deep - Mountain High" (Tina Turner) Withdrawn

After recovering Cosima signed with an independent label and became the first independent artist to debut at #1 on the charts. Her debut single was the cover of Cold Chisel's "When the War Is Over". Cosima later released several singles and a gold selling self-titled album.

=== Paulini Curuenavuli ===
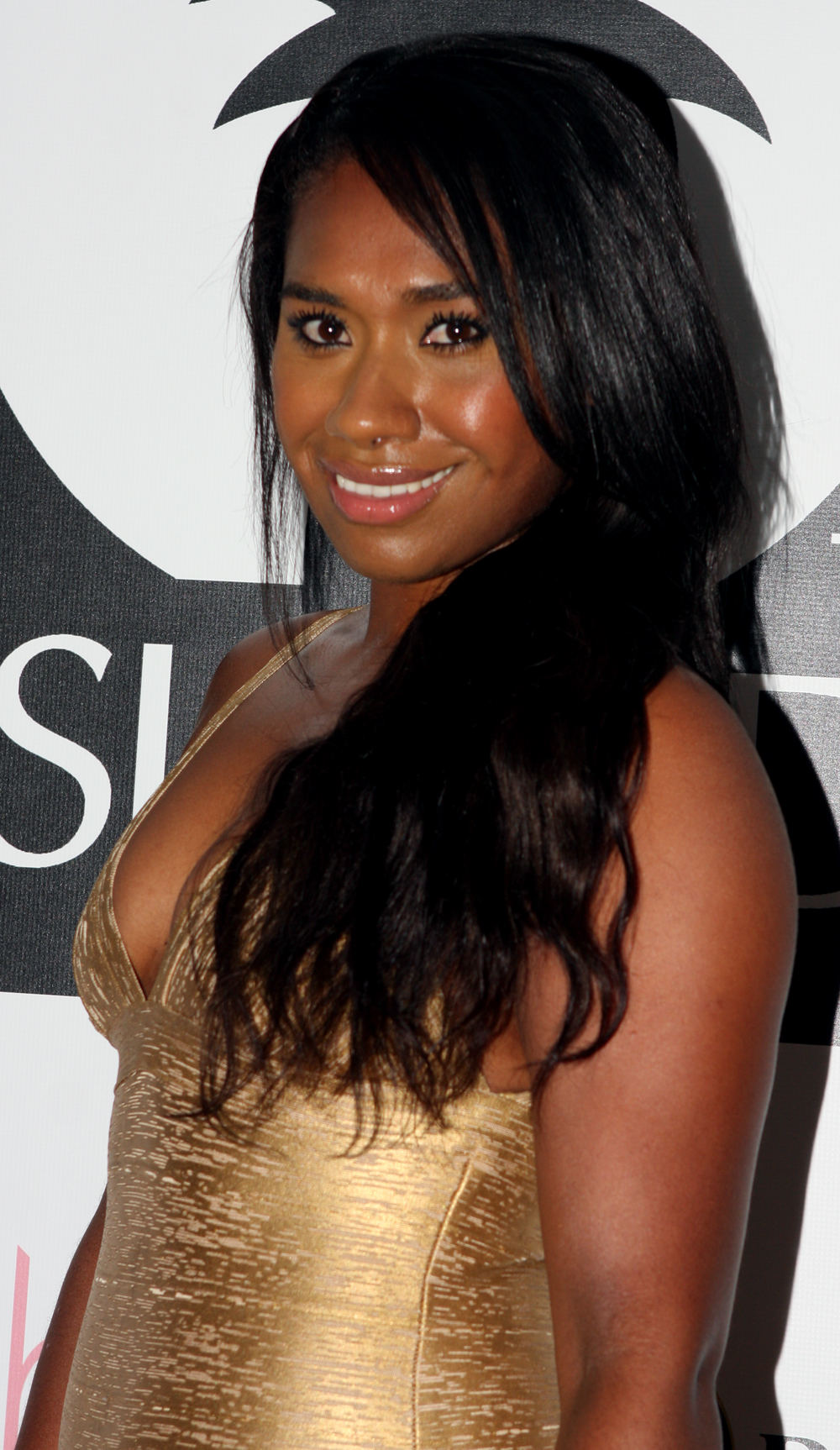
Paulini Curuenavuli

Paulini Curuenavuli (born 15 October 1982), was eliminated on 27 October 2003, placed fourth.

Audition: "Ain't No Mountain High Enough" (Marvin Gaye & Tammi Terrell)
Theatre Week (Round 1):
Theatre Week (Round 3): "Go to Hell" (Nina Simone)
Top 40: "Somewhere" (Barbra Streisand)
Top 12: "Don't Leave Me This Way" (Thelma Houston)
Top 10: "Eternal Flame" (The Bangles)
Top 8: "Chains" (Tina Arena)
Top 6: "Freeway of Love" (Aretha Franklin) ~ TOUCHDOWN! Bottom 2
Up, Close & Personal: "Fields of Gold" (Sting)
Top 5: "Un-Break My Heart" (Toni Braxton) & "Survivor" (Destiny's Child)
Top 4: "At Last" (Etta James) & "Almost Like Being in Love" (Natalie Cole) Eliminated

Paulini performed "Freeway of Love", "The Voice Within", "Crazy in Love" and "Chains" during the Australian Idol national tour in 2004.

=== Rob Mills ===
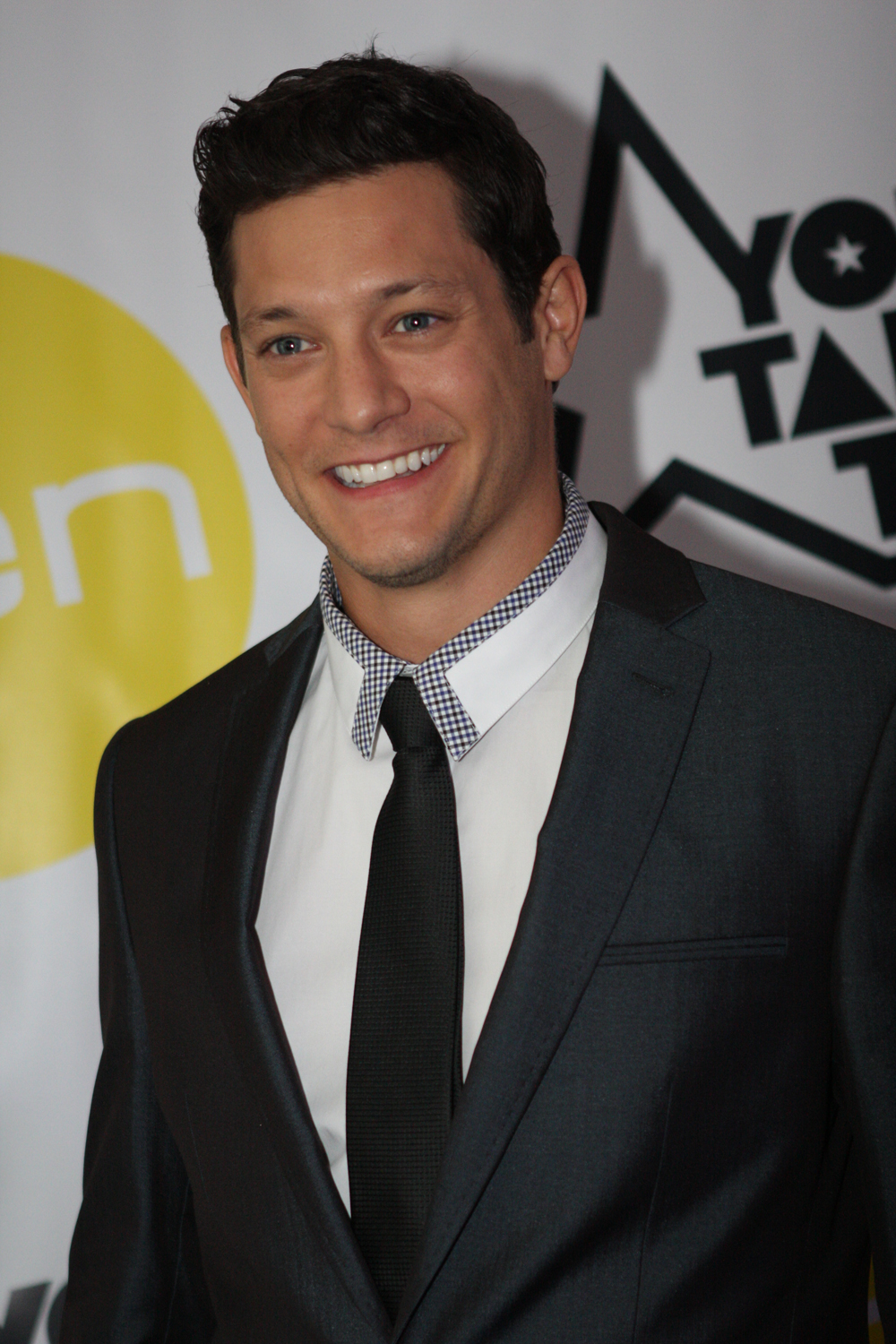
Rob Mills

Rob Mills aka Millsy (born 21 June 1982), was eliminated on 20 October 2003, placed fifth.

Audition: "Swear It Again" (Westlife)
Theatre Week (Round 1): "Swear It Again" (Westlife)
Theatre Week (Round 3):
Top 40: "Angels" (Robbie Williams)
Top 12: "All Right Now" (Free)
Top 10: "You Don't Treat Me No Good" (Sonia Dada)
Top 8: "Take Me Back" (Noiseworks)
Top 6: "If I Could" (1927)
Up, Close and Personal: "When You Say Nothing at All" (Ronan Keating)
Top 5: "Too Close" (Next) and "If I Could Turn Back the Hands of Time" (R. Kelly) Eliminated

=== Levi Kereama ===
Levi Kereama (Born 1981-4 October 2008) was eliminated on 13 October 2003, placed sixth.

Audition:
Theatre Week (Round 1):
Theatre Week (Round 3):
Top 40: "Nice and Slow" (Usher)
Wildcard Show: "Maria Maria" (Santana)
Top 12: "Superstition" (Stevie Wonder)
Top 10: "Rock Your Body" (Justin Timberlake)
Top 8: "To the Moon and Back" (Savage Garden) Bottom 3
Top 6: "Every Little Step" (Bobby Brown) Eliminated

A record contract followed and he got into his band Lethbridge with his three brothers. On 4 October 2008, Levi died after falling from the balcony of the Brisbane hotel where he had been staying.

=== Rebekah LaVauney ===
Rebekah LaVauney (born 7 October 1977), was eliminated on 6 October 2003, placed seventh.

Audition:
Theatre Week (Round 1): "Joyful, Joyful" (Lauryn Hill)
Theatre Week (Round 3): "Love Takes Time" (Mariah Carey)
Top 40: "Ex-Factor" (Lauryn Hill)
Wildcard Show: "Exhale (Shoop Shoop)" (Whitney Houston)
Top 12: "Emotion" (Samantha Sang)
Top 10: "Killing Me Softly with His Song" (The Fugees)
Top 8: "Heading in the Right Direction" (Renee Geyer) Eliminated

She released a single cover of Renée Geyer's "Heading in the Right Direction" (which she had previously performed on the show) which was featured on her only commercial release, an EP titled 'Chapter 1' (2005). The EP also featured a collaboration with Joel Turner and the Modern-Day Poets, "Behind Bars", which was also included on their self-titled album.

=== Kelly Cavuoto ===
Kelly Cavuoto (born 3 June 1981), was eliminated on 6 October 2003, placed eighth. Prior to Australian Idol, she had many years singing experience with rock bands throughout South Australia, before auditioning in 2004. Dubbed "The Rock Chick" by judge Ian "Dicko" Dickson, she covered a selection of harder edged rock songs throughout the series, at odds with most other contestants who chose to cover pop songs.

Audition: "Just A Girl" (No Doubt)
Theatre Week (Round 1): "Chase The Dragon" (Machine Gun Fellatio)
Theatre Week (Round 3): "You Oughta Know" (Alanis Morissette)
Top 40: "Bring Me to Life" (Evanescence)
Top 12: "Whole Lotta Love" (Led Zeppelin) Bottom 3
Top 10: "Tomorrow" (Silverchair) Bottom 3
Top 8: "Mascara" (Killing Heidi) Eliminated

In January 2004, Cavuoto appeared as a co-host for Channel Ten's Video Hits music program.

=== Lauren Buckley ===
Lauren Buckley (born 29 March 1986), was eliminated on 29 September 2003, placed ninth. At only seventeen at the time, she was the youngest finalist of the first season. Also memorable was her elimination from the show, in which she broke down and cried while singing her farewell song. She completed the song with the assistance of her fellow Idol contestants.

Audition: "Cry Me a River" (Ella Fitzgerald)
Theatre Week (Round 1):
Theatre Week (Round 3): "Turn Me On" (Norah Jones)
Top 40: "Imagine" (John Lennon)
Top 12: "Moondance" (Van Morrison)
Top 10: "Lady Marmalade" (Pink, Christina Aguilera, Mýa & Lil' Kim). Originally (Labelle) Eliminated

=== Cle Wootton ===
Cle Wootton (born Cleonie Morgan-Wootton on 15 November 1981), was eliminated on 29 September 2003, placed tenth. Of English and Jamaican descent, she was an early favourite with the judges, however failed to maintain an interest from fans. She has also appeared in the children's drama program Ship to Shore in 1993 playing the character Babe and appeared on the reality television program Popstars in 2002.

Audition: "Pussy Town" (Machine Gun Fellatio)
Theatre Week (Round 1):
Theatre Week (Round 3): "Ain't Nobody Better" (Inner City)
Top 40: "Come to Me" (Diesel)
Top 12: "Young Hearts Run Free" (Candi Staton)
Top 10: "That's the Way Love Goes" (Janet Jackson) Eliminated

In 2004, she appeared in a musical production called Gabba Gabba Hey, a rock musical featuring the music of the Ramones. In 2005, she appeared on an episode of the children's television series Streetsmartz. She performed in Hair in 2007; and Hairspray in 2010, in the role of DJ Motormouth Maybelle in Melbourne's theatre musical version of . In 2017, she was performing as Mrs Phelps in the Australian edition of Matilda the Musical.

=== Peter Ryan ===
Peter Ryan, from New South Wales, was eliminated on 22 September 2003, placed eleventh.

Audition: "Comic Conversation" (John Farnham)
Theatre Week (Round 1):
Theatre Week (Round 3): "Now and Forever" (Richard Marx)
Top 40: "Right Here Waiting" (Richard Marx)
Top 12: "Your Song" (Elton John) Eliminated

=== Mathew Chadwick ===
Mathew Chadwick (born 19 July 1983), was eliminated on 22 September 2003, placed twelfth.

Audition: "I Want To Make Magic" (Fame)
Theatre Week (Round 1): "Tiny Dancer" (Elton John)
Theatre Week (Round 3): "Two Beds and a Coffee Machine" (Savage Garden)
Top 40: "Truly" (Lionel Richie)
Top 12: "If" (Bread) Eliminated

As of 2007, he was under the management of Richard Macionis, and performing in Queensland's Dracula's Cabaret along with Macionis. Prior to Australian Idol he had played Fred as part of the Scooby Doo section of Warner Brothers Movie World in his home state of Queensland.

== Finals elimination chart ==
Date	Bottom Three
22 September	Mathew Chadwick	Peter Ryan	Kelly Cavuoto
29 September	Cle Wooten	Lauren Buckley	Kelly Cavuoto
6 October	Kelly Cavuoto	Rebekah LaVauney	Levi Kereama
13 October	Levi Kereama	Paulini Curuenavuli	Shannon Noll
	Bottom Two
20 October	Rob Mills	Cosima De Vito
27 October	Paulini Curuenavuli
3 November	Cosima De Vito
19 November	Shannon Noll	Guy Sebastian

== Elimination chart ==
Legend
Did Not Perform	Top 40	Wild Card	Top 12

Stage:		Semi-Finals					WC	Finals							
Week:		11/8	18/8	25/8	1/9	8/9	15/9	22/9	29/9	6/10	13/10	20/10	27/10	3/11	19/11
Place	Contestant	Result													
1	Guy Sebastian			Top 12											Winner
2	Shannon Noll			Top 12							Btm 3				Runner-up
3	Cosima De Vito		Elim				Top 12					Btm 2		WD	
4	Paulini Curuenavuli					Top 12					Btm 2		Elim		
5	Rob Mills					Top 12						Elim			
6	Levi Kereama				Elim		Top 12			Btm 3	Elim				
7	Rebekah LaVauney			Elim			Top 12			Elim					
8	Kelly Cavuoto		Top 12					Btm 3	Btm 3	Elim					
9	Lauren Buckley				Top 12				Elim						
10	Cle Wootton				Top 12				Elim						
11	Peter Ryan	Top 12						Elim							
12	Mathew Chadwick		Top 12					Elim							
Wild; Card	Courtney Act					Elim	Elim								
Wild; Card	Stu Campbell					Elim	Elim								
Wild; Card	Eli Diache	Elim					Elim								
Wild; Card	Yolande Jackson			Elim			Elim								
Wild; Card	Rebecca Tapia		Elim				Elim								
Wild; Card	Axle Whitehead		Elim				Elim								
Semi- Final; 5	Anton Aktila					Elim									
Semi- Final; 5	Marcus Jones					Elim									
Semi- Final; 5	Alex Longstaff					Elim									
Semi- Final; 5	Ben Manusama					Elim									
Semi- Final; 4	Brandon Burns				Elim										
Semi- Final; 4	Michelle Cashman				Elim										
Semi- Final; 4	Brielle Davis				Elim										
Semi- Final; 4	Mary Lane				Elim										
Semi- Final; 4	Costa Zacharia				Elim										
Semi- Final; 3	Jennifer Pearl			Elim											
Semi- Final; 3	Martine Robert			Elim											
Semi- Final; 3	Ryan Sheppard			Elim											
Semi- Final; 3	Anthony Sumbati			Disq											
Semi- Final; 2	Hailey Cramer		Elim												
Semi- Final; 2	Marc Stockley		Elim												
Semi- Final; 2	Sidney Maynard		Elim												
Semi- Final; 1	Lorena Alegria	Elim													
Semi- Final; 1	Natalie Ferguson	Elim													
Semi- Final; 1	Chelsea Gibson	Elim													
Semi- Final; 1	Veronica Stewart	Elim													
Semi- Final; 1	Shannon Thompson	Elim													
Semi- Final; 1	Daniel Wakefield	Disq													

== Commercial releases ==
Since winning Australian Idol, Guy Sebastian has released ten top 10 albums, including three #1's. Sebastian has also released 23 top 20 singles, with 14 reaching the top 10, including six #1's. He has the most #1 singles for an Australian male vocalist in Australian music history, and he is third overall for all Australian acts. He has a total of 82 platinum and six gold certifications in Australia, the highest accreditations for any Australian Idol contestant. Sebastian's debut album Just As I Am reached #1 and 6× platinum, eventually selling 480,000 copies. Just As I Am remains the highest selling album ever released by an Australian Idol contestant. Sebastian's winner's single "Angels Brought Me Here" debuted at #1 and reached 5× platinum. The song was the highest selling single in Australia in 2003, and won the 2004 Highest Selling Single ARIA Award. In 2010 ARIA announced it was the highest selling song of the previous decade. Sebastian's second and third albums were platinum sellers. Beautiful Life peaked at #2, with Closer to the Sun reaching #4 His fourth album The Memphis Album peaked at #3 and went on to sell 2× platinum. Sebastian's 5th album, Like It Like That, achieved platinum certification. His album, Twenty Ten was certified 2x platinum, and Armageddon gained triple platinum certification. Armageddon. Sebastian's eighth album, Madness, has been certified gold. "Like it Like That", the 5× platinum title track from his fifth album, reached #1 and was the highest selling Australian artist song of 2009.

"Who's That Girl" the only single released from Twenty Ten also reached #1 and was certified 6× platinum. It was nominated for the 2011 ARIA Best Pop Release and Song of the Year, and won the Highest Selling Single ARIA. "Don't Worry Be Happy", Armageddon's lead single, reached #5 and gained 5× platinum certification. The third single, "Battle Scars" featuring Lupe Fiasco, became his sixth #1 single in Australia, and has been certified 14× platinum. Sebastian's most recent album, T.R.U.T.H., became his third to reach #1, and has been certified platinum. During his career, Sebastian has received 34 ARIA Award nominations, winning seven of them including Best Pop Release and Best Live Act.

Sebastian also had success outside of Australia with his first single reaching #1 in Malaysia, Singapore, the Philippines and Indonesia and New Zealand in 2004. His first album reached #3 in New Zealand. "Angels Brought Me Here" gained platinum and Just As I Am double platinum accreditation in New Zealand. Sebastian has achieved five further top ten singles in New Zealand since then, including another #1 with "Who's That Girl", and now has a total of 10 platinum and 6 gold certifications there. Sebastian is currently the only Australian Idol contestant to chart in the US. "Battle Scars" reached #71 on the Billboard Hot 100, #23 on the Billboard Digital Songs Chart and #1 on the Billboard R&B/Hip-hop Digital Song Chart. It spent 20 weeks in the Hot 100 and was certified triple platinum in the US for sales of three million. "Battle Scars" also reached #2 in Norway. In 2015 Sebastian was selected to represent Australia in the Eurovision Song Contest. He finished 5th, and his song "Tonight Again" charted in the top 50 in a number of European countries, including No.6 in Iceland and 16 in Austria.

Shannon Noll released his first single "What About Me?" in February 2004. It debuted at #1 and remained at the top for four weeks. It was certified 4× Platinum and was the highest selling single in Australia in 2004. His debut album That's What I'm Talking About was also a chart topper gaining 5× Platinum accreditation selling 350,000 copies. Both the single and album were nominated as highest seller at the 2004 ARIA Awards. His second album Lift also reached #1 on the ARIA charts and remained in the top 50 for 53 weeks. It was accredited 3× platinum with 210,000 copies sold. Lift received a nomination for best pop release at the 2006 ARIA Awards and the lead single "Shine" was nominated for highest selling single. "Don't Give Up" a duet with Natalie Bassingthwaighte was also nominated for highest selling single at the 2007 ARIA Awards. His third album, Turn It Up, was released in 2007 peaking at #3 and reaching platinum accreditation. His fourth album, No Turning Back: The Story So Far, released in 2008 peaked at #7, and his fifth album, A Million Suns, released in 2011 reached #8. Neither of these albums reached certification. Noll has released ten top 10 singles including three #1's. He is the only artist in Australian music history to achieve ten consecutive top 10 singles. He has released seven more singles since achieving this, with two reaching the ARIA Top 50, the highest one peaking at #26. He has gained 17 platinum and three gold accreditations during his career. Noll has had some success outside Australia with his debut single What About Me reaching #2 in Ireland and #10 in New Zealand. His debut album also peaked at #31 on the New Zealand charts.

Cosima De Vito released "When the War Is Over" as her debut single in mid-2004 through her own independent label, CDV Records. It was a #1 hit and sold over 70,000 copies resulting in platinum status. Her debut self-titled album Cosima peaked at #2 on the charts and reached gold certification. Her second single "Now That You Can't Have Me" peaked at #42 on the charts. Her second album This Is Now that was released in September 2007 didn't chart in the ARIA Charts.

Paulini Curuenavuli released a debut single titled "Angel Eyes" which reached #1 and platinum certification. It stayed at the top spot for four weeks. Her debut album One Determined Heart also reached #1 and received platinum status. Her Christmas EP Amazing Grace: Songs for Christmas peaked at #72. Her second album Superwoman reached #70. The album gave her two top 50 singles. In 2006 Paulini joined an all-girl pop group called Young Divas with other former Idol contestants including Kate DeAraugo, Emily Williams, Ricki-Lee Coulter and later Jessica Mauboy. They achieved success with a double platinum album and platinum and gold singles.

Courtney Act has become a successful drag queen performer based in Los Angeles. In December 2013, Logo announced that Courtney Act was among 14 drag queens who would be competing on the sixth season of RuPaul's Drag Race. She later went on to become a finalist in the competition, alongside fellow contestants Adore Delano and Bianca Del Rio, but in the season finale lost the title to Bianca Del Rio. In July 2014, Courtney Act became the first drag performer in history to sing live with the San Francisco Symphony Orchestra. Act appeared as a guest performer with Cheyenne Jackson in "Hello, Gorgeous! Cheyenne Jackson Goes to the Movies". The two sang a duet of "Elephant Love Song" from the 2001 Baz Luhrmann film Moulin Rouge!. In September 2014, Courtney Act, along with Willam Belli and Alaska Thunderfuck 5000, were the first drag queens to become ad girls for American Apparel. They worked for the campaign Support Artists, Support Ethical Manufacturing of the fashion brand, featuring three limited exclusive T-shirts that honors each drag queen's talents and allure. Courtney also has a wig company called Wigs By Vanity that she set up in 2003 for drag queens with a business partner and fellow drag queen, Vanity Faire. In December 2015, Courtney was featured on two singles from the Christmas Queens LP, "From Head To Mistletoe", and "Christmas Sweater" with fellow American Apparel ad girls Willam and Alaska. As of 2016, Act has been a foreign correspondent for the Australian news website, Junkee. Act covered the presidential election of 2016 for the site, attending rallies of both Hillary Clinton and Donald Trump. Following Trump's election, Act also participated in and reported on the 2017 Women's March.

Rob Mills experienced a very short lived career at Sony BMG with one gold selling single "Ms. Vanity" and an album titled Up All Night which peaked at #21. He was later dropped from the label. He appeared in the Australian 2008 production of Wicked, and has also worked in television.

Preceded by Inaugural	Australian Idol; Season 1 (2003)	Succeeded by Season 2 (2004)
