= One Night Without You =

2004 single by Cosima

Single by Cosima

from the album Cosima
- A-side: "When the War Is Over"
- Released: 9 August 2004
- Studio: Realsongs (Hollywood, California)
- Length: 4:52
- Label: CDV
- Songwriter: Diane Warren
- Producer: Pete Stengaard

Cosima singles chronology
"When the War Is Over" / "One Night Without You" (2004)	"Now That You Can't Have Me" (2004)

"One Night Without You" is a song written by Diane Warren for Australian singer Cosima's debut album, Cosima (2004). The song was released on 9 August 2004 as a double A-side with her cover of the Cold Chisel song "When the War Is Over". The single reached number one on the Australian ARIA Singles Chart and remained there for two weeks, making Cosima the fourth Australian Idol finalist to reach number one in 2004, after Guy Sebastian, Shannon Noll, and Paulini. The single was later certified platinum in Australia for shipments of over 70,000 units.

== Background ==
"One Night Without You" was written by American songwriter, Diane Warren, as one of ten tracks for Australian singer, Cosima's debut album, Cosima (2004). The singer had competed in the first season of Australian Idol in late 2003 and finished in the top three. Cosima's first single, the double A-sided, "When the War Is Over" / "One Night Without You", was released on 9 August 2004. "When the War Is Over" is a cover version of Cold Chisel's ballad. It debuted at No. 1 on the ARIA Singles Chart. The single was certified platinum by ARIA for shipment of 70,000 units by December 2004.

== Track listing ==
Australian CD single

1. "When the War Is Over" – 3:47
2. "One Night Without You" – 4:21
3. "When the War Is Over" (acoustic version) – 3:45
4. "One Night Without You" (extended mix) – 4:52

== Charts ==
=== Weekly charts ===
Chart (2004)	Peak position
Australia (ARIA)	1

=== Year-end charts ===
Chart (2004)	Position
Australia (ARIA)	37

== Certifications ==
Region	Certification	Certified units/sales
Australia (ARIA)	Platinum	70,000^{^}
^{^} Shipments figures based on certification alone.
