= Keep It Natural (song) =

Single by Cosima De Vito

from the album This Is Now
- Released: 5 June 2007
- Recorded: 2005–2007
- Genre: Dance-pop
- Label: Independent
- Songwriter(s): Cosima De Vito, Trevor Steel
- Producer(s): Trevor Steel

Cosima De Vito singles chronology
"Now That You Can't Have Me" (2005)	"Keep It Natural" (2007)	"Movin' On" (2006)

"Keep It Natural" is the first single taken from Australian singer Cosima De Vito's second studio album This Is Now. It reached the top thirty in the ARIA Club Charts and reached #4 on the AIR Independent Charts, and even charted on the ARIA Singles Chart, at #112.
