= Painted on My Heart =

2000 single by The Cult

Single by The Cult

from the album Gone in 60 Seconds (soundtrack)
- Released: 2000
- Genre: Rock
- Length: 3:50
- Label: Island Def Jam
- Songwriter(s): Diane Warren
- Producer(s): Michael Beinhorn

The Cult singles chronology
"Star" (1994)	"Painted on My Heart" (2000)	"Rise" (2001)

"Painted on My Heart" is a song by British rock band The Cult, released in 2000 as a single in promotion of the film Gone in 60 Seconds. The song was written by Diane Warren and tells about an unforgettable love.

== Track listing ==
=== Australia ===
1. The Cult - "Painted on My Heart" (Radio edit) - 3:50
2. Caviar - "Sugarless" - 3:07
3. Citizen King - "Better Days (And the Bottom Drops Out)" (Remix) - 6:24
4. The Cult - "Painted on My Heart" (Rock version) - 4:27

== Charts ==
Chart (2000)	Peak position
Australia (ARIA)	198
US Mainstream Rock (Billboard)	26

=== Year-end charts ===
Chart (2000)	Position
Brazil (Crowley)	99

== Cover versions ==
- Cosima De Vito recorded a version of the song which is featured on her debut album. The album Cosima was released in Australia on 11 October 2004. The album reached the number two spot on the Australian ARIA Albums Chart. Cosima De Vito was a finalist on the first season of Australian Idol, and reached third place in the competition before leaving the show due to an acute vocal cord illness.
- Aerosmith recorded a version for the Gone in 60 Seconds soundtrack, but the version by The Cult was the one that ended up being featured in the film.
- Marc Terenzi recorded a version of the song which is featured on his debut album. The album Awesome was released in Germany on 26 September 2005.
