= Roxy Jacenko =

Australian businesswoman and socialite (born 1980)

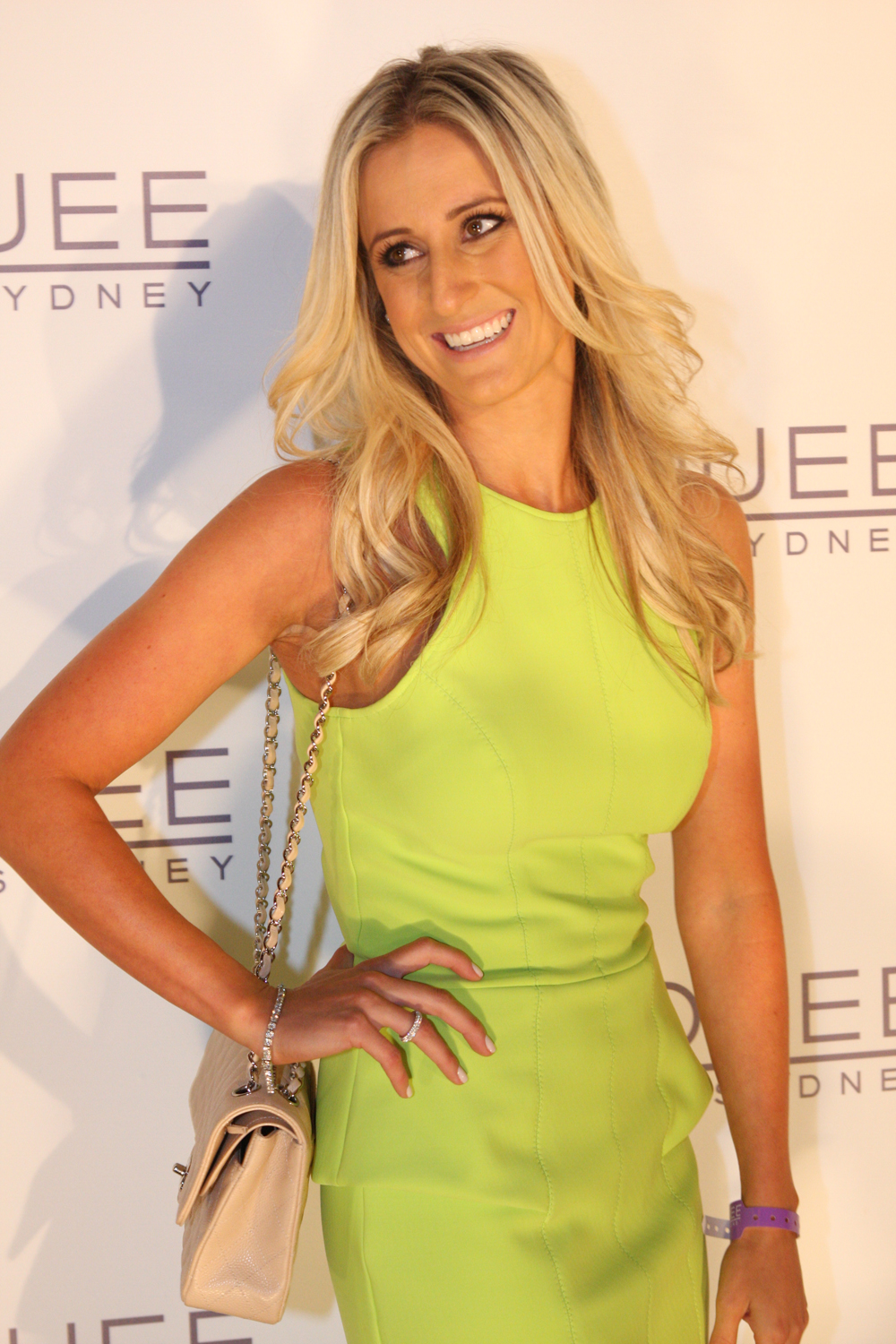
- Jacenko in 2012
- Born: 8 June 1980 (age 46); Sydney, Australia
- Occupations: Businesswoman, socialite
- Years active: 2004–present

Roxanne Jacenko (born 8 June 1980) is an Australian businesswoman and socialite who was one of the runners up on the third season of The Celebrity Apprentice Australia.

== Career ==
Jacenko is the director of Sydney-based public relations firm, Sweaty Betty PR, taking its name from the London clothing firm, Sweaty Betty, founded in 2004 when Jacenko was 24 years old. The company once boasted more than 70 clients including brands Peugeot, Coles Supermarkets, Oliver Peoples and Harris Scarfe, celebrity Maude Garrett, and MasterChef Australia contestant Hayden Quinn.

=== Television ===
In early 2010, Jacenko signed a deal with the Seven Network to star in a semi-scripted reality television show called The Sweat Box (a play on the name of her PR agency). It was announced that the show would be similar to the US television show, The Hills, but would focus on Sydney's affluent Eastern Suburbs. Later in 2010, Channel Seven cancelled production of the show.

In 2013, Jacenko appeared on the Australian version of The Celebrity Apprentice. Her appearance was characterised by conflicts with Prue MacSween and swimmer Stephanie Rice and by accusations she favoured some team-mates over others. In the season final, Jacenko, John Steffensen and Jeff Fenech were named as runners-up to Rice who was named Celebrity Apprentice.

In 2020, it was announced Jacenko would be participating in the Seven Network's reality program SAS Australia. Jacenko was the first to exit the show.

=== Publishing ===
In 2012, Jacenko published her first book, Strictly Confidential: A Jazzy Lou Novel. It was published by Allen & Unwin and is a semi-fiction "behind-the-scenes" view of the public relations and fashion industries. Reviewing the book before its official release, columnist Ros Reines suggested many of the characters were "so thinly disguised as to almost be see-through"—that many were, in fact, caricatures of real and well-known Sydney socialites. In a 2013 Good Weekend feature, Jacenko admitted she shared several significant character traits with the novel's main character including an "extreme" dedication to her career, a passing addiction to Nurofen and "strict" dieting. In 2017, Jacenko has also admitted to battling depression while her husband was in jail.

Jacenko's second book, which was to be titled The Insider, was due to be released in December 2013. Instead, in November 2013, Jacenko released The Rumour Mill: A Jazzy Lou Novel, the second novel in her "Jazzy Lou" series.

== Personal life ==
Jacenko has one daughter and one son. Her daughter, Pixie, has started two companies: Pixie's Fidgets, a toy company, and Pixie's Bows, a hair accessory company. Her husband is former investment banker Oliver Curtis, who was convicted and imprisoned for insider trading in 2016. He was released in 2017. They previously lived in Vaucluse, New South Wales.

== Filmography ==
Year	Title	Role	Notes
2013	The Celebrity Apprentice Australia	Herself	TV series (runner-up)
2019	I Am...Roxy	Herself	Pilot episode
2020	SAS Australia	Herself	TV series
