= Every Single Day (Rob Mills song) =

Single by Rob Mills

from the album Up All Night
- Released: August 2004
- Recorded: 2004
- Genre: Pop; rock
- Label: Sony BMG Australia
- Songwriter(s): Phil Buckle; Rob Mills

Rob Mills singles chronology
"Ms. Vanity" (2004)	"Every Single Day" (2004)

"Every Single Day" is the second single released by former Australian Idol contestant Rob Mills. "Every Single Day" was released in August 2004 and peaked at number 24 on the Australian ARIA Singles Chart.

== Track listing ==
1. "Every Single Day" – 3:37
2. "All Right Now" (live at 001) – 4:14
3. "Dirty Girl" – 3:55

== Charts ==
Chart performance for "Every Single Day"
Chart (2004)	Peak position
Australia (ARIA)	24
