= Gone in 60 Seconds (soundtrack) =

Soundtrack album by Various artists
- Released: June 6, 2000
- Genre: Alternative rock Electronic; Hip hop
- Length: 55:29
- Label: Island
- Producer: Jerry Bruckheimer; Kathy Nelson

Singles from Gone in 60 Seconds
- 1. "Painted on My Heart" Released: 2000

Professional ratings
Review scores
Source	Rating
Allmusic	2/5 stars
Filmtracks	2.58 stars on a 5 point scale
SoundtrackNet	2/5 stars

Gone in 60 Seconds is the soundtrack to the 2000 action film, Gone in 60 Seconds. It was released on June 6, 2000, through Island Records and consisted of a blend of alternative rock, electronic and hip hop music. The album managed to make it to #69 on the Billboard 200 and #25 on the Top Soundtracks. The song "Painted on My Heart" was also released as a single.

== Track listing ==
1. "Painted on My Heart" - 4:27 (The Cult)
2. "Machismo" - 3:36 (Gomez)
3. "Flower" - 3:25 (Moby)
4. "Rap" - 4:15 (Groove Armada)
5. "Leave Home" - 5:13 (The Chemical Brothers)
6. "Da Rockwilder" - 2:20 (Method Man & Redman)
7. "Roll All Day" - 3:15 (Ice Cube)
8. "Sugarless" - 3:07 (Caviar)
9. "Never Gonna Come Back Down" - 3:47 (BT feat. Mike Doughty)
10. "Too Sick to Pray" - 4:46 (Alabama 3)
11. "Party Up (Up in Here)" - 4:32 (DMX)
12. "Stop the Rock" - 3:33 (Apollo 440)
13. "Better Days (And the Bottom Drops Out) (Remix)" - 6:25 (Citizen King)
14. "Boost Me" - 2:49 (Trevor Rabin)

The following tracks were included in the movie's credits but omitted in the soundtrack:

1. "Busy Child" - 7:23 (The Crystal Method)
2. "Low Rider" - 3:13 (War)
3. "Been Caught Stealing" - 3:34 (Jane's Addiction)
4. "Ride On Josephine" - 4:26 (George Thorogood & The Destroyers)
5. "If Everybody Looked the Same" - 3:36 (Groove Armada)
6. "You Won't Fall" - (Lori Carson)
7. "Folsom Prison Blues" - (Johnny Cash)
8. "Shine On Me" - (Torch Song)
9. "Brick House" - (The Commodores)

== Charts ==
Chart (2000)	Peak position
Australian Albums (ARIA)	15
Austrian Albums (Ö3 Austria)	4
French Albums (SNEP)	47
German Albums (Offizielle Top 100)	29
New Zealand Albums (RMNZ)	48
Swiss Albums (Schweizer Hitparade)	26
UK Compilation Albums (OCC)	33
UK Soundtrack Albums (OCC)	43
US Billboard 200	69
US Soundtrack Albums (Billboard)	25
