= The Celebrity Apprentice Australia season 3 =

The Celebrity Apprentice Australia
- Season 3
- Starring: Mark Bouris (CEO); Dane Bouris (advisor); Deborah Thomas (advisor)
- No. of contestants: 14
- Winner: Stephanie Rice
- No. of episodes: 9

Release
- Original network: Nine Network
- Original release: 30 April – 25 June 2013

Season chronology
- ← Previous; Season 2 Next → Season 4

The third season of The Celebrity Apprentice Australia began airing on 30 April 2013 on the Nine Network. The series was announced following the conclusion of the second season in 2012. Mark Bouris returned as CEO, his boardroom advisors were again Dane Bouris and Deborah Thomas. The official cast was announced on the Celebrity Apprentice Australia Facebook page on 30 January 2013. Olympic swimmer Stephanie Rice was the winner this season, beating out Olympic sprinter John Steffenson, Socialite Roxy Jacenko, and retired boxer Jeff Fenech.

== Candidates ==
The numbers of cast member increased to 14 in 2013, two more than the previous seasons.

Candidate	Background	Original team	Age	Charity	Result	Raised
Stephanie Rice	Olympic Gold Champion	Supreme	25	The Heart Foundation	The Celebrity Apprentice (25-06-2013)	$181,750
John Steffensen	Olympic Athlete	Fabulous	30	National Aboriginal Sporting Chance Academy	Fired in task 9 (25-06-2013)	$40,000
Roxy Jacenko	Socialite and Businesswoman	Supreme	31	Sydney Children's Hospital	Fired in task 9 (25-06-2013)	$40,000
Jeff Fenech	Boxing World Champion	Fabulous	48	Save Our Sons	Fired in task 9 (25-06-2013)	$179,200
Dawn Fraser	Olympic Legend	Supreme	75	Sunshine Coast Riding for the Disabled	Fired in task 8 (18-06-2013)	$60,000
Prue MacSween	Social Commentator	Supreme	52	Victor Chang Cardiac Research Institute	Fired in task 8 (18-06-2013)	$50,000
Layla Subritzky	Reality Star	Supreme	24	Lifeline	Fired in task 7 (11-06-2013)	$5,000
Dermott Brereton	AFL Legend	Fabulous	48	The Shane Warne Foundation	Fired in task 7 (11-06-2013)	$294,687.99
Peter Everett	TV Host	Fabulous	52	Skin and Cancer Foundation	Fired in task 6 (04-06-2013)	$32,743.11
Rob Mills	Entertainer	Fabulous	30	The Reach Foundation	Fired in task 5 (28-05-2013)	$40,000
Kym Johnson	Queen of Ballroom	Supreme	36	The Merry Makers	Fired in task 4 (21-05-2013)	$10,000
Brian Mannix	Rock Legend	Fabulous	51	Prostate Cancer Foundation of Australia	Fired in task 3 (14-05-2013)	$10,000
Peter Berner	Comedian	Fabulous	50	ChildFund Australia	Fired in task 2 (7-05-2013)	$10,000
Prinnie Stevens	Urban Pop Princess	Supreme	31	Musicians Make a Difference	Fired in task 1 (30-04-2013)	$10,000

== Weekly results ==
Candidate	Original team	Task 3 Team	Task 4 Team	Task 5 Team	Task 6 team	Task 7 team	Task 8 team	Final task team	Application result	Record as project manager
Stephanie Rice	Supreme	Supreme	Supreme	Fabulous	Supreme	Supreme	Supreme	Supreme	The Celebrity Apprentice	1-0 (win in task 3)
John Steffensen	Fabulous	Supreme	Fabulous	Fabulous	Fabulous	Fabulous	Fabulous	Fabulous	Fired in final task	1-0 (win in task 5)
Roxy Jacenko	Supreme	Supreme	Supreme	Supreme	Fabulous	Supreme	Fabulous	Fabulous	Fired in final task	1-0 (win in task 2)
Jeff Fenech	Fabulous	Fabulous	Fabulous	Fabulous	Supreme	Fabulous	Fabulous	Supreme	Fired in final task	1-1 (win in task 1, loss in task 7)
Dawn Fraser	Supreme	Fabulous	Supreme	Fabulous	Fabulous	Supreme	Supreme		Fired in task 8	1-1 (win in task 7, loss in task 1)
Prue MacSween	Supreme	Fabulous	Supreme	Fabulous	Supreme	Supreme	Supreme		Fired in task 8	0-1 (loss in task 3)
Layla Subritzky	Supreme	Supreme	Supreme	Supreme	Supreme	Fabulous			Fired in task 7	0-1 (loss in task 5)
Dermott Brereton	Fabulous	Fabulous	Fabulous	Supreme	Supreme	Fabulous			Fired in task 7	1-0 (win in task 6)
Peter Everett	Fabulous	Fabulous	Fabulous	Supreme	Fabulous				Fired in task 6	0-1 (loss in task 6)
Rob Mills	Fabulous	Supreme	Fabulous	Supreme					Fired in task 5	1-0 (win in task 4)
Kym Johnson	Supreme	Supreme	Supreme						Fired in task 4	0-1 (loss in task 4)
Brian Mannix	Fabulous	Fabulous							Fired in task 3	
Peter Berner	Fabulous								Fired in task 2	0-1 (loss in task 2)
Prinnie Stevens	Supreme								Fired in task 1	

No.	Candidate	Elimination chart								
No.	Candidate	1	2	3	4	5	6	7	8	9
1	Stephanie	IN	IN	WIN	IN	IN	IN	IN	LOSE	CA
2	John	IN	IN	IN	IN	WIN	IN	IN	IN	FIRED
3	Roxy	IN	WIN	IN	BR	IN	BR	IN	WIN	FIRED
4	Jeff	WIN	BR	IN	IN	IN	IN	LOSE	IN	FIRED
5	Dawn	LOSE	IN	IN	IN	IN	BR	WIN	FIRED	
6	Prue	IN	IN	LOSE	IN	IN	IN	IN	FIRED	
7	Layla	IN	IN	IN	BR	LOSE	IN	FIRED		
8	Dermott	IN	IN	BR	IN	IN	WIN	FIRED		
9	Peter E.	IN	BR	IN	IN	BR	FIRED			
10	Rob	IN	IN	IN	WIN	FIRED				
11	Kym	IN	IN	IN	FIRED					
12	Brian	IN	IN	FIRED						
13	Peter B.	IN	FIRED							
14	Prinnie	FIRED								

The candidate was on the losing team.
The candidate won the competition and was named the Celebrity Apprentice.
The candidate won as project manager on his/her team.
The candidate lost as project manager on his/her team.
The candidate was brought to the final boardroom.
The candidate was fired.
The candidate lost as project manager and was fired.

== Tasks ==
Unlike last season, the show only airs one episode per week, on Tuesdays, consisting of both the task and the boardroom.

=== Task 1 ===
- Airdate: 30 April 2013
- Supreme's Project manager: Dawn Fraser
- Fabulous' Project manager: Jeff Fenech
- Task: To run a fish and chip shop, including skinning and gutting their own fish, and making their own chips from scratch.
- Winning team: Fabulous
  - Reasons for victory: The men while having horrible team communication, eventually came out on top due to having received much larger donations from their connections.
- Losing team: Supreme
  - Reasons for loss: Despite having many more people visit their fish and chip store, the girls failed to bring in big donors and focused more on the public customers. Another problem was that Layla and Prinnie who were assigned to cooking focused solely on that and raised $165 and $2000–$3000 respectively.
  - Sent to Boardroom: No final boardroom
- Fired: Prinnie Stevens - for focusing too much on the cooking of the food and not the bigger picture, which was focusing on getting the big donors in.
- Notes:
  - At the very start of the task, both teams were asked to line themselves up in order of most to least famous. With Jeff and Dawn being most famous on each team, they were then made project managers.
  - Jeff Fenech initially won $199, 200 for his charity, but asked for $20,000 to go to Dawn Frasers charity.
  - Throughout the task, Prue had problems with Roxy, and in the final boardroom was targeted by the whole team, despite being very close to being fired, she was given another chance.
  - A representative from Woman's Day magazine and special guest and the original Celebrity Apprentice winner Julia Morris visited both shops and awarded the team with the best service with $5000, this went to the men's team.
  - Upon testing out the women's team, there was a hair found in Julia's chip, this was a large part of the reason why the men won the donation.

=== Task 2 ===
- Airdate: 7 May 2013
- Supreme's Project manager: Roxy Jacenko
- Fabulous' Project manager: Peter Berner
- Task: Teams must create a consumer promotion event, that promotes the new range of Arnott's Tim Tam treat packs.
- Winning team: Supreme
  - Reasons for victory: The girls didn't focus on the brands slogan 'Love more than one'. However, their event was extremely sophisticated and they were able to pull in a bigger crowd for a longer amount of time.
- Losing team: Fabulous
  - Reasons for loss: While a rep from the Arnott's company thought that they had created a fantastic concept, and great branding along with their jingle, they didn't make Tim Tam feel special.
  - Sent to Boardroom: Peter Berner, Jeff Fenech, Peter Everett
- Fired: Peter Berner - Unable to control his team and utilize the effectiveness of each team member, and was ultimately culpable for the team's loss as project manager.
- Notes:
  - Roxy and Prue yet again were fighting and yelling at each other for the whole task.
  - Roxy won $40,000 for her charity.

=== Task 3 ===
- Airdate: 14 May 2013
- Team Reshuffle: Prue and Dawn move to Fabulous, Rob and John move to Supreme. This leads to a Young vs Old battle, as the two teams are determined based on age. Supreme are the team of "Young" players (all under 40) and Fabulous the team of "Old" players (all over 40).
- Supreme's Project manager: Stephanie Rice
- Fabulous' Project manager: Prue MacSween
- Task: Each team must create a photo exhibition that tells a personal story of one person on their team.
- Winning team: Supreme
  - Reasons for victory: Jason Maclaine from Canon thought that the team worked well all night, were relatively on brief, and loved the emotion in the shots.
- Losing team: Fabulous
  - Reasons for loss: While Jason Maclaine from Canon thought that their pictures were very gritty and very powerful, he felt that there could have been more emotion and colour in the pictures instead of black and white.
  - Sent to Boardroom: Prue MacSween, Dermott Brereton, Brian Mannix
- Fired: Brian Mannix - For failing to raise sufficient funds for his team, and conceding that Brereton would have more capability in fundraising in future tasks.
- Notes:
  - Team Supreme focused on the story of how John Steffenson was inspired by his father to be an Olympic runner, while Team Fabulous focused on the story of Jeff Fenech who as a young child, grew up in gang violence and was even incarcerated at one point, which led him to become a World Boxing Champion.
  - Stephanie and Rob were seen having a possible secret romance between them.
  - In the boardroom, Jeff said that he believed for the second fundraising task in a row, people were holding back with their donors and waiting until they themselves were project managers so they could win. Then Jeff got into a disagreement with John. After a few words back and forth, Jeff yelled 'I'm fired!' and stormed out of the boardroom, and walked off set. Mr Bouris allowed John to go out and talk with Jeff. During this time they settled their difference and both returned.
  - Dawn Fraser was absent for the boardroom due to a pre planned surgery.
  - John and Roxy raised the most for this task. $30,000 and $26,000 respectively.
  - Team Supreme received a $40,000 cash bonus from Canon.
  - Stephanie handed over $50,000 from her total winning amount to Prue's charity.

=== Task 4 ===
- Airdate: 21 May 2013
- Team Reshuffle: The contestants return to their original teams.
- Supreme's Project manager: Kym Johnson
- Fabulous' Project manager: Rob Mills
- Task: To create a 90-second commercial for The Yellow Brick Road Retire Right campaign. They will perform their commercial live to a stadium of 14,000 people at a half time Sydney rugby game. Teams will be judged on how they convey the key messages in the most entertaining, educational and creative manner and how they produce the most appealing and creative advertising materials.
- Winning team: Fabulous
  - Reasons for victory: Their presentation was more direct and planned. The message was also conveyed in a more creative way.
- Losing team: Supreme
  - Reasons for loss: Though their presentation showed promise after their poor rehearsal at the stadium, Supreme failed to establish the point of the retirement fund message and verify a connection to the audience with their performance.
  - Sent to Boardroom: Kym Johnson, Roxy Jacenko, Layla Subritzky
- Fired: Kym Johnson- She was the project manager and caused the presentation last minute, unplanned.
- Notes:
  - Team Supreme's project manager, Kym, being a dancer herself, decided to make everyone in the team dance. This was changed last minute, and caused a very unplanned presentation.
  - Roxy spoke too quickly during their presentation, cutting off Stephanie's line completely. She defended herself in the boardroom, blaming this on the project manager and saying that she would be the one who should have fixed things up, and also saying that what she did would not have affected anything.
  - Peter was seen trying to speak up. He did so, and caused quite a bit of tension and argument in Team Fabulous, as the others did not agree with his approach to things. He was also upset at not having a major role for the presentation, but in the end actually did receive a bigger role.

=== Task 5 ===
- Airdate: 28 May 2013
- Team Reshuffle: Dawn, Prue and Stephanie move to Fabulous, Dermott, Peter E. and Rob move to Supreme.
- Supreme's Project manager: Layla Subritzky
- Fabulous' Project manager: John Steffensen
- Task: To create a presentation for the Blackberry smartphone, and to present them at a light show at Hyde Park Barracks.
- Winning team: Fabulous
  - Reasons for victory: There was good use of the team's celebrities in the light show and the Blackberry executives were impressed with the high level of the presentation. The only problem was the live introduction on the night.
- Losing team: Supreme
  - Reasons for loss: Although it was also impressive with a wide range of colours used in the light show, the Blackberry executives believed that it was not as good as the other team's. Also, the dancers used could have disturbed the actual show itself.
  - Sent to Boardroom: Layla Subritzky, Peter Everett, Rob Mills
- Fired: Rob Mills - For not giving his all in the task, and failing to give sufficient reasons to remain over Peter in the boardroom.
- Notes:
  - The executives for the task were highly impressed with both teams, and raised the winner's cheque by a substantial amount. Mr. Bouris decided to split the money between the team's project manager: $40,000 for the winner, and $5000 for the loser.
  - Dawn accused Stephanie of having not respected her in the boardroom. Prue took Stephanie's side and defended her. Stephanie cried, and felt so emotional she had to leave the boardroom.
  - Roxy was evidently seen as the one taking over the project manager role in Team Supreme. Mr Bouris could see this, and questioned Rob "Who was the project manager?" repeatedly.

=== Task 6 ===
- Airdate: 4 June 2013
- Team Reshuffle: Peter E. and Roxy move to Fabulous, Jeff, Prue and Stephanie move to Supreme.
- Supreme's Project manager: Dermott Brereton
- Fabulous' Project manager: Peter Everett
- Task: Celebrities will run a laundry. They must dry clean, wash, steam, press and hand wash the laundry. Additionally, they will offer their services to the public, their friends, and their sponsors. The team that makes the most money will win the task.
- Winning team: Supreme
  - Reasons for victory: The Team managed to gather over $200,000 from contacts.
- Losing team: Fabulous
  - Reasons for loss: Even with a $100,000 donation from AussieBum, the team couldn't raise more than Fabulous.
  - Sent to Boardroom: Peter Everett, Roxy Jacenko, Dawn Fraser
- Fired: Peter Everett - Raising the least amount of money, not working hard as project manager, and losing respect from his teammates for his poor efforts before and during the task.
- Notes:
  - One of the customers that Prue brought in for her team went to the wrong counter and earned the other team $1000. Prue was not happy with this and decided to call her client to fire the customer, as he was not taking it seriously and ignored Prue.
  - Roxy was dominating and made attacks to her project manager.
  - The camera used for the record $100,000 by Team Fabulous was taken by Jeff and he was accused to have bad intentions of deleting the photos taken. The camera was also missing a certain function which without would have not allowed the photos to be printed, and Jeff was blamed to have stolen it.
  - Dermott decided to donate 10% of his earnings to Peter's charity ($32,743)
  - In this task, set were two Celebrity Apprentice Australia records: The largest individual donation ever ($100,000 from AussieBum) and the largest total funds raised in a challenge ($327,431)

=== Task 7 ===
- Airdate: 11 June 2013
- Team Reshuffle: Dawn and Roxy move to Supreme, Dermott, Jeff and Layla move to Fabulous.
- Supreme's Project manager: Dawn Fraser
- Fabulous' Project manager: Jeff Fenech
- Task: The celebrities will create a 30-second web promo to help launch the new product for the Heinz soup range called 'Soup of the day'. They will present their promo to Heinz representatives at a special screening.
- Winning team: Supreme
  - Reasons for victory: Brent, a representative from Heinz thought that the brand could have featured a little bit stronger within the promo, but loved their slogan 'Fresh look, Old favourite'
- Losing team: Fabulous
  - Reasons for loss: Brent was very concerned about the tone of their promo (based on 50 Shades of grey) and whether it was indeed family friendly. He also thought it was a little bit controversial for such a brand.
  - Sent to Boardroom: Jeff Fenech, Layla Subritzky, Dermott Brereton
- Fired: Dermott Brereton, Layla Subritzky - Dermott for getting carried away with the theme of the promo and not discussing it with the team, Layla because Mr Bouris felt Jeff had more to give in the next few challenges.
- Notes:
  - This episode featured a double elimination.
  - Prue and Roxy were arguing throughout the entire episode.
  - With Dawn and Jeff as project managers, this was the second time in which they have faced off in the series, after task 1 where Jeff beat Dawn.
  - Dawn received $40,000 for her charity from Heinz.

=== Task 8 ===
- Airdate: 18 June 2013
- Team Reshuffle: Roxy moves to Fabulous.
- Supreme's Project manager: None
- Fabulous' Project manager: None
- Task: Teams must makeover a teens crisis centre, The Don Bosco House for CEO of Youth Off The Streets' Father Chris Riley in just 24 hours. They will be judged on certain areas of the house. Team Fabulous will work on the front office, the entertainment room and an outdoor gym while Team Supreme will be judged on the back garden, the dining room and the lounge.
- Winning team: Fabulous
  - Reasons for victory: The three rooms were refurbished well, but the most important facet of victory was the teams cohesiveness.
- Losing team: Supreme
  - Reasons for loss: The team did not work as well together as Fabulous, and were frequently at odds with Fabulous.
  - Sent to Boardroom: Stephanie Rice, Prue MacSween, Dawn Fraser
- Fired: Prue MacSween, Dawn Fraser - Prue for her constant arguing with Roxy, Dawn because Mr Bouris felt as though the younger Stephanie should advance ahead of the older Dawn.
- Notes:
  - This episode featured a double elimination.
  - This task there were no project managers, however Roxy assigned herself the 'Team Co-ordinator' early on.
  - This task teams decided they should work together to achieve a happy ending for such a great cause. this includes Prue and Roxy who have been rivals since the very first task. They decided to stop their bickering and fighting to help a worthy cause, but only ended up bickering again just two minutes later, they did however assist each other throughout the task despite being on separate teams. Prue later stated in the boardroom she felt very bad about an altercation they had.
- The teams received assistance from former Celebrity Apprentice Contestants. Warwick Capper and Patti Newton assisted Fabulous and Max Markson and Nathan Joliffe assisted Supreme.

=== Task 9 (Finale) ===
- Airdate: 25 June 2013
- Team Supreme: Stephanie Rice, Jeff Fenech
- Team Fabulous: Roxy Jacenko, John Steffenson
- Task: An extension of the previous task, the teams are tasked with creating a 'wall' of support for the children and young men and women of Don Bosco House, and present them to an audience.
- Fired: Jeff Fenech, Roxy Jacenko, John Steffenson
- Celebrity Apprentice: Stephanie Rice
- Notes:
- Stephanie donated $40,000 to the charities of those who had not won money for their charity ($10,000 each to the individual charities of Prinnie Stevens, Peter Berner, Brian Mannix and Kym Johnson).

== Ratings ==
Episode		Airdate	Timeslot	Viewers (millions)	Night Rank	Source
1	"Fish 'N' Chip Challenge"	30 April 2013	Tuesday 8:30 pm	0.866	#10	
1	"Boardroom"	30 April 2013	Tuesday 8:30 pm	0.808	#11	
2	"TimTastic Challenge"	7 May 2013	Tuesday 8:30 pm	1.276	#3	
2	"Boardroom"	7 May 2013	Tuesday 8:30 pm	0.829	#10	
3	"Photography Challenge"	14 May 2013	Tuesday 8:30 pm	1.026	#8	
3	"Boardroom"	14 May 2013	Tuesday 8:30 pm	0.748	#12	
4	"Live Commercial Challenge"	21 May 2013	Tuesday 8:30 pm	0.812	#12	
4	"Boardroom"	21 May 2013	Tuesday 8:30 pm	0.754	#14	
5	"Light Projection Challenge"	28 May 2013	Tuesday 8:30 pm	0.725	#14	
5	"Boardroom"	28 May 2013	Tuesday 8:30 pm	0.663	#17	
6	"Dirty Laundry Challenge"	4 June 2013	Tuesday 8:30 pm	0.685	#15	
6	"Boardroom"	4 June 2013	Tuesday 8:30 pm	0.674	#16	
7	"Soupathon Challenge"	11 June 2013	Tuesday 8:30 pm	0.633	#19	
7	"Boardroom"	11 June 2013	Tuesday 8:30 pm	0.672	#17	
8	"Charity Make-over Challenge"	18 June 2013	Tuesday 8:30 pm	0.542	—N/a	
8	"Boardroom"	18 June 2013	Tuesday 8:30 pm	0.596	#19	
9	"Hope-Full Challenge with Youth off the Streets"	25 June 2013	Tuesday 8:30 pm	0.573	—N/a	
9	"Final Boardroom"	25 June 2013	Tuesday 8:30 pm	0.653	#18	
