= Rob Mills =

Australian singer (born 1982)

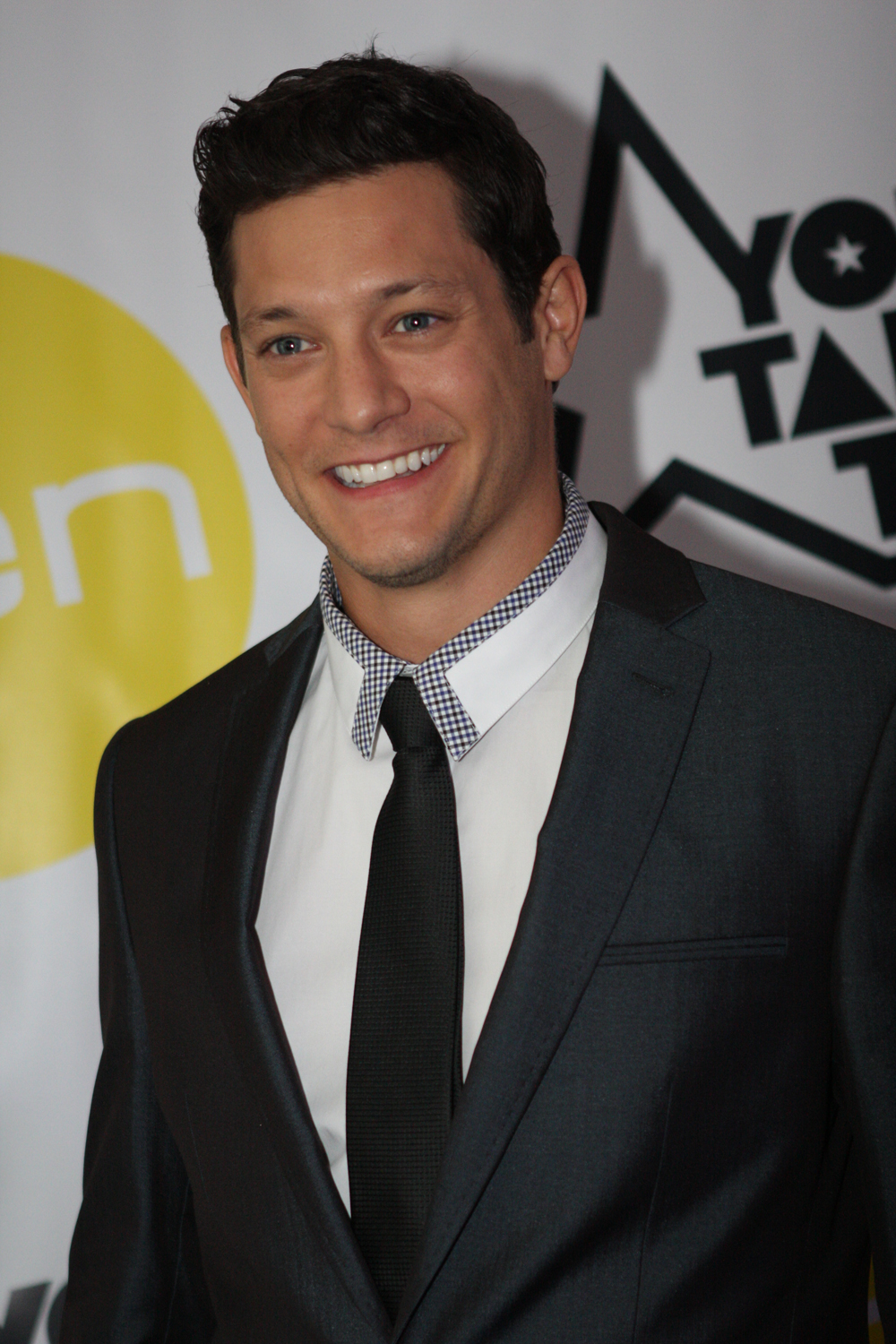
- Mills in 2012

Background information
- Born: Robert Mills; 21 June 1982 (age 44); Melbourne, Australia
- Genre: Pop
- Occupations: Actor, singer-songwriter, television host
- Years active: 2003–present
- Label: Sony BMG (2003–2004)
- Website: robmills.net.au

Robert Mills (born 21 June 1982) is an Australian stage and screen actor, television host and singer-songwriter. He was one of the finalists from the first season of Australian Idol in 2003. He co-hosted the late-night quiz show The Mint and was a regular singer on the game show The Singing Bee both on the Nine Network. Mills took part in the ninth season of Dancing with the Stars, and appeared on Celebrity Apprentice. In 2008, Mills won the lead male role of Fiyero in a production of Wicked, and continued the role when it moved around Australia. He has since starred in a number of popular large scale musical theatre productions. In 2012, Mills was announced as the host of Network Ten's revamped Young Talent Time. He played teacher Finn Kelly on Neighbours from 2017 until 2022.

== Early life ==
Mills attended Brentwood Secondary College until the end of Year 10, frequently participating in the school Battle of the Bands concert. He completed Year 11 and 12 at Box Hill Senior Secondary College. Mills formed a band called "The Megamen" with two friends and soon developed a keen following on the Melbourne live music scene with their sessions every Sunday at the Red Eagle Hotel at Albert Park. Mills is a resident of Melbourne.

== Australian Idol ==
Mills was a contestant on the first series of Australian Idol and he made it into the top five. He performed on "Rise Up", the number one Australian single performed by all the Australian finalists in 2003. Mills performed the song "Dirty Girl" on the double platinum album Australian Idol: Final 12 soundtrack released in October 2003.

Mills' song list:

1. Melbourne Audition – "Swear It Again" (Westlife)
2. Semi-final Group 5 – "Angels" (Robbie Williams)
3. Final 12 (70s) – "Alright Now" (Free)
4. Final 10 (#1 Hits) – "You Don't Treat Me No Good" (Sonia Dada)
5. Final 8 (Aussie Hits) – "Take Me Back" (Noiseworks)
6. Final 6 (80s) – "If I Could" (1927)
7. Up, Close and Personal – "When You Say Nothing at All" (Ronan Keating)
8. Final 5 (R&B/Soul) – "Too Close" (Next) and "If I Could Turn Back the Hands of Time" (R. Kelly)

== Post-Idol ==
=== Touring and television ===
He signed a contract with BMG in 2004. His first album Up All Night was released in Australia on 14 June 2004 and debuted in the top 40. The first single from the album Ms Vanity was released on 31 May in Australia and debuted at No. 6 in the Australian singles charts.

In July 2005, Mills toured the east coast of Australia, playing from Cairns to Tasmania. Also performing on national TV, KAK, The Today Show and Carols by Candlelight while on tour. After having completed his tour, he had a starring role as Johnny Casino alongside John Farnham, Natalie Bassingthwaighte and Craig McLachlan in Grease – The Musical Arena Tour. The tour was a commercial and critical success..

Mills hosted a television show Stooged on Network Ten, a hidden-camera show. The show premiered on 28 July 2005 however was cancelled shortly after due to declining ratings. During Triple M's tsunami fundraiser, where people pledged money to hear their favourite song played, Mills satirically called the station and requested his own song. This was a request made of him by the radio station.

Mills admitted on the television show Spicks and Specks that he had a brief but highly publicised tryst with celebrity heiress Paris Hilton at the Melbourne Cup of 2003. He later made fun of the tryst by singing "I Love Paris" (best known in a recording by Frank Sinatra) to close-off the show.

On 31 July 2007, Mills started a co-hosting role on the late-night, live quiz show The Mint which aired on the Nine Network. He appeared in a stunt for the ABC TV show The Chaser's War on Everything alongside Craig Reucassel that satirised the Tasmanian Premier Paul Lennon. In October 2007, Mills and three others were selected to be regular singers on the game show The Singing Bee. On 4 June 2009 it was announced on Today Tonight that he was on the new season of Dancing with the Stars. He was the second person to be eliminated.

In 2009 and early 2010 Mills had a role as a recurring character on the Australian children's show The Shak On 26 May 2010, Mills appeared on an episode on the children's game show Pyramid and again on 7, 16 and 23 June 2010. On 9 June 2010 Mills appeared on variety show Hey Hey It's Saturday accompanying the show's band. He appeared in a guest role in Winners & Losers as Sean and was cast as jazz singer, Eric Connolly in the Nine Network series Underbelly: Razor.

In August 2011, it was announced that Rob would host a new version of the popular Australian talent show Young Talent Time, with co-production duties from original host Johnny Young.

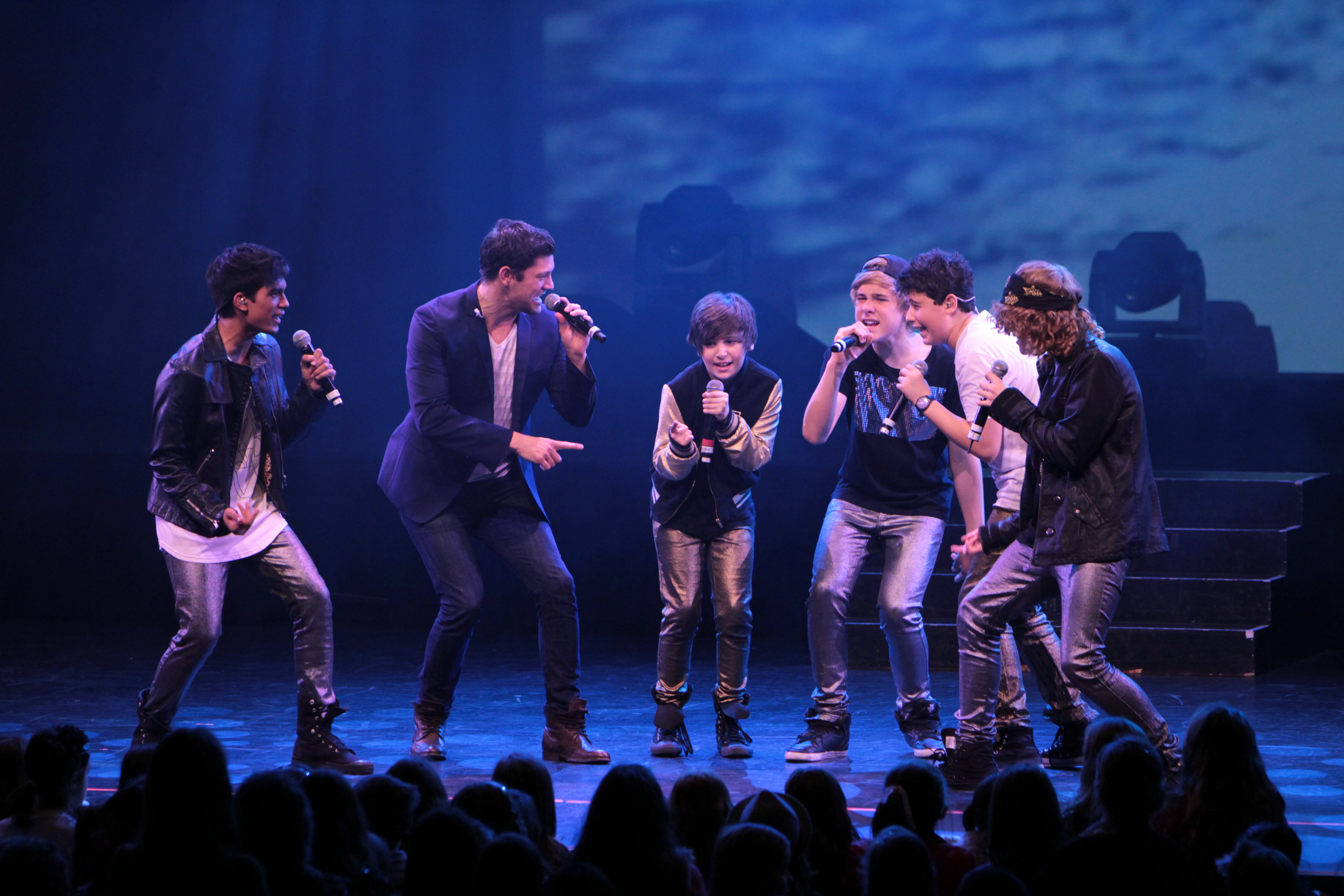
Rob Mills performs with the boys from Young Talent Time

Mills joined the Young Talent Time cast in a live tour throughout June and July 2012. There were a total of 14 shows across 8 venues, beginning in Sydney and Canberra, and ending with five sold-out shows at Melbourne's Crown Casino. Mills hosted the show and performed solo and with cast members. The show featured the Young Talent Time Grand Final winners Lil' Banditz Krew performing as a group and with the team. The tour also featured choreography and dancers from the Project Dance creative team.

In 2013, Mills competed on the third season of The Celebrity Apprentice Australia. He won $40,000 for his charity in the fourth task, but he was fired in the following episode.

Mills joined the cast of Neighbours in November 2016 as teacher Finn Kelly. His first scenes aired on 15 March 2017. He reprised the role in 2018.

In 2018 he featured in the 'Ex-Reality TV Stars' episode on series three of ABC Television's 'You Can't Ask That’.

In 2019, Mills was revealed to be the 'Wolf' on The Masked Singer Australia and was the runner-up on the first season of the show.

In 2023, Mills was named King of Moomba for the Moomba Festival alongside Rhonda Burchmore.

In March 2025, Mills was announced as a contestant on the forthcoming ninth season of Network 10's The Amazing Race Australia competing alongside his partner Georgie Tunny. The couple made it to the grand finale, and ultimately finished in second place, behind Stephen and Bernard Curry.

=== Musical theatre ===
In 2005, Mills toured Australia in Grease – The Arena Spectacular as Johnny Casino alongside an all star cast with Craig McLachlan, Natalie Bassingthwaighte, Magda Szubanski and John Farnham.

In May 2007, Mills appeared as the lead role of Claude in the sold-out Perth production of the rock musical Hair along with Cosima De Vito and Nikki Webster. The production was directed by Chris Kabay and musically directed by Simon Holt of Yellow Glass Theatre.

Mills then originated the coveted lead male role of Fiyero in the Australian production of the Broadway musical Wicked. The show opened on 12 July 2008, in Melbourne where it ran for 13 months, closing on 9 August 2009. It then transferred to Sydney from 12 September. He originally starred opposite Lucy Durack as Glinda, Amanda Harrison as Elphaba and the late Rob Guest as The Wizard. Mills played his final performance on 6 June 2010.

From 13–30 July 2011, Rob played the role of Jamie in Jason Robert Brown's musical The Last Five Years at Sydney's Seymour Centre.

In March 2012, it was announced that Mills will play Warner Huntington III in the Australian production of Legally Blonde, which also starred his Wicked co-star Lucy Durack as the main character, Elle Woods. The Australian production season began in September 2012 at the Lyric Theatre, Sydney, before opening on 4 October 2012. It then went on to play at the Lyric Theatre in Brisbane from March 2013. It then opened in Melbourne at the Princess Theatre in May 2013.

In 2013, Mills played the role of Danny in the Australian tour of Grease, which began performances October 2013 at Sydney's Lyric Theatre, has travelled all around Australia, which finished its run doing a second season in Melbourne at Her Majesty's Theatre. The show closed in late January 2015.

In August 2015 Mills joined Swing on This, a quartet of musical theatre stars which includes Michael Falzon, Matt Lee, Luke Kennedy and Ben Mingay. Swing on This perform contemporary swing in a predominantly cabaret format.

In 2015, Mills toured with his cabaret show Surprisingly Good, (nominated for a Sydney Theatre Award) playing in cabaret festivals in Melbourne, Noosa, Sydney, Mackay and Brisbane.

In 2016, he took on the leading role of Sam in the Australian production of Ghost the Musical. He was nominated for a Helpmann Award for Best Actor in a Musical.

2017 saw Mills play the role of Jesus Christ in The Production Company's revival of the Andrew Lloyd Webber and Tim Rice rock opera, Jesus Christ Superstar. The production was staged at Arts Centre Melbourne from 29 July to 13 August.

From August to October 2022, Mills played Corny Collins in the Australian revival production of Hairspray.

Since February 2023, Mills has played Shakespeare in the Australian production of & Juliet.

=== Stage acting ===
In 2018 Rob Mills joined the cast for the Australian performance of American play Puffs. He plays the characters of Cedric Diggory and Voldemort.

== Discography ==
=== Albums ===
List of studio albums, with selected chart positions
Title	Album details	Peak chart positions
Title	Album details	AUS
Up All Night	Released: 14 June 2004; Label: BMG Australia (8287662645); Format: CD	21

=== Singles ===
List of singles, with selected chart positions and certifications
Title	Year	Peak chart positions	Certifications	Album
Title	Year	AUS	Certifications	Album
"Ms. Vanity"	2004	6	ARIA: Gold	Up All Night
"Every Single Day"	2004	24		Up All Night

=== As featured artist ===
List of singles as featured artist, with selected chart positions and certifications
Title	Year	Peak chart positions	Certifications	Album
Title	Year	AUS	Certifications	Album
"Rise Up" (with Australian Idol Top 12)	2003	1	ARIA: Gold	Australian Idol: The Final 12
"Twelve Days of Christmas" (with Dreamtime Christmas All-Stars)	2004	26		Non-album single

== Awards and nominations ==
=== Helpmann Awards ===
The Helpmann Awards is an awards show, celebrating live entertainment and performing arts in Australia, presented by industry group Live Performance Australia since 2001. Note: 2020 and 2021 were cancelled due to the COVID-19 pandemic.

Year	Nominee / work	Award	Result	Ref.
2016	Rob Mills – Ghost: the Musical	Helpmann Award for Best Male Actor in a Musical	Nominated	
