= This Is Now =

Studio album by Cosima De Vito
- Released: 29 September 2007
- Recorded: 2005–2007
- Genre: Pop rock, dance-pop
- Label: Independent

Cosima De Vito chronology
Cosima (2004)	This Is Now (2007)	...

Singles from This Is Now
- 1. "Keep It Natural" Released: June 2007; 2. "Movin' On" Released: October 2007

This Is Now is the second studio album by Australian Idol finalist and Australian singer-songwriter Cosima De Vito. It was released nearly 3 years after her debut, Cosima, and like Cosima was released independently, although unlike her debut, this album did not chart on the ARIA Albums Chart. The first single from the album, Keep It Natural charted at number 112 on the ARIA Singles Chart.

== Track listing ==
1. "Keep It Natural"
2. "Movin' On"
3. "I Deserve Better Than That"
4. "I'm Free"
5. "Take Me Back Home"
6. "I Forgive You (Not)"
7. "Never Be a Woman in Chains"
8. "So Alive"
9. "Left Waiting"
10. "Forever Young"
