= Up All Night (Rob Mills album) =

Studio album by Rob Mills
- Released: 14 June 2004
- Recorded: 2003–2004
- Genre: Pop
- Label: Sony BMG

Singles from Up All Night
- 1. "Ms Vanity" Released: 31 May 2004; 2. "Every Single Day" Released: August 2004

Up All Night is the debut studio album by Australian musician Rob Mills, released on 14 June 2004. The album peaked at number 21 on the ARIA Charts.

== Making of the album ==
In 2003, Rob Mills rose to prominence as a contestant on Australian Idol, eventually placing fifth. Mills was signed to Sony BMG and recorded the album in the first half of 2004.

== Track listing ==
No.	Title	Writer(s)	Producer(s)	Length
1.	"Ms Vanity"	Jim Marr; Tony Vincent; Matthew Gerrard	Matthew Gerrard	3:45
2.	"That's All You Are"	Jason Phelps; Shelly Peiken; Wally Gagel	James Kempster; Simon Hosford	3:22
3.	"Overrated"	Chesney Hawkes; Daniel Pandher; Ear	Kempster; Hosford	3:38
4.	"I Confess"	Adam Gould; Paul Wiltshire; Victoria Wu	Paul Wiltshire	3:26
5.	"Goodbye"	Rob Mills; Phil Buckle	Phil Buckle	3:22
6.	"Dirty Girl"	Arnthor Birgisson; Matt Prime	Paul Wiltshire	3:55
7.	"Inviting"	Paul Shirley; Watson	Adrian Hannan; Watson	3:01
8.	"Can't Sleep"	Mills; Paul Aiden	Kempster; Hosford	3:21
9.	"Every Single Day"	Mills; Buckle	Buckle	3:36
10.	"Right Here"	Mills; Kempster; Hosford	Kempster; Hosford	4:03
11.	"Control"	Mills; Aiden	Wiltshire	3:12
12.	"Bad Timing"	Mills; Buckle	Buckle	3:33
13.	"Holding On"	Mills; Shirley; Watson	Watson	3:52

== Charts ==
Chart performance for Up All Night
Chart (2004)	Peak position
Australian Albums (ARIA)	21

== Release history ==
Release history for Up All Night
Country	Date	Format	Label	Catalogue
Australia	14 June 2004	CD	BMG Australia	8287662645
