= Cosima De Vito =

Australian singer-songwriter

- Also known as: Cosima
- Born: Cosima De Vito; 1 November 1976 (age 50); Perth, Western Australia
- Genres: Pop, contemporary
- Occupation: Singer-songwriter
- Instrument: Vocals
- Years active: 2003–present
- Label: Independent

Cosima De Vito (born 1 November 1976), also known as Cosima, is an Australian pop and R&B singer-songwriter. Born and raised in Perth, Western Australia, she is best known for her cover version of the Australian single "When the War Is Over" (2004), which reached No. 1 on the ARIA Singles Chart. De Vito won her first talent competition at the age of 9. In 2003 she appeared on the first season of Australian Idol. After reaching the semi-finals, she withdrew from the series due to throat nodules.

During the Australian Idol series, De Vito released her first single "When the War Is Over" and was the first independent artist to reach a platinum certification; whilst being No. 1 on the ARIA charts. Following on from her awards, De Vito went on to record and produce in Los Angeles with songwriter Diane Warren. On 11 October 2004, she released her self-titled debut album which reached No. 2 on the ARIA charts. The album was certified gold on release as it also hit No. 1 on the independent charts. She returned to the studio to record her second album This Is Now. De Vito wrote several tracks on her second album. In addition to her career as a singer-songwriter, she starred in the musical Hair on its Australian tour.She has also performed on several TV shows, and at events including the Prime Minister's Parliament Gala Dinner, the televised Dream Foundations Gala Dinner in Los Angeles, and Channel 7's Carols by Candlelight.

After being voted best new artist for Pop Republic magazine, De Vito launched her single “Right Here, Right Now” on Channel 10, with a live performance in October 2012. Her rendition of the carol "O Holy Night" was released over the 2012 Christmas season, as she performed the single at multiple national Christmas events. Following a number of tours, live performances, festivals, and dance parties, She toured the country performing shows with her band. She was invited to perform the Australian national anthem on various occasions for major sporting events including the Melbourne Cup, State of Origin, Fox Sports and the NBL All-Stars game.

On 5 November 2013, De Vito produced the new single, “Beyond The Horizon”. In addition, she also received another nomination for female artist of the year. The single came from her album, "Power of Love", which officially released in 2017.

== Early years ==
Cosima De Vito was born on 1 November 1976 and grew up in Hamilton Hill, a suburb of Perth. Her father, Carlo De Vito, is an Italian-born house painter and contractor and her mother, Maria, is a partner in the family business. De Vito's grandfather was an Italian tenor who sang Neapolitan folk songs and opera. In 2006, De Vito's younger brother, Modesto (born ca 1980), joined his parents' firm as a painter, their younger sister is Sarina (born ca 1985). De Vito entered various talent contests while in primary school – at the age of nine she won a competition. She cited Whitney Houston, Shirley Bassey, Tina Turner and Karen Carpenter as being major influences on her personal style. She attended Murdoch University, and graduated with a Bachelor of Commerce degree – major in finance and banking. Turning to a career in entertainment, De Vito made contact with talent agents who enabled her to travel to Nashville, Tennessee, US in 2001 to record a demo tape and discuss a recording deal but was turned down because of a lack of an Australian fan base. During 2003 De Vito worked as an office administrator in a Perth publicity and conference business.

== Career ==
=== 2003: Australian Idol ===
In May 2003, De Vito successfully auditioned for the first season of TV talent competition series, Australian Idol, with a performance of Celine Dion's "I Surrender". From July to November she appeared on the weekly televised episodes and moved to Sydney that year, she entered as one of the judges' wild card choices. De Vito finished in third position after having to withdraw from the competition due to a diagnosis of vocal cord nodules when she lost her voice singing "River Deep – Mountain High". Idol judge Ian Dickson claimed that she would have won. However, following medical advice, she withdrew from the competition and underwent speech therapy allowing fellow contestant Shannon Noll to join Guy Sebastian in the series grand final. According to opera singer and music teacher Juliette Hughes, in The Age, De Vito and other contestants:

"[o]ften, quite talented young singers fall into bad vocal habits. It's a style thing: they get told to belt and force, to the point of damage. When Cosima famously had to pull out from the first series because she had nodules, no reputable singing teacher in Australia could have been surprised. She had been showing the signs for some time. Her voice was losing its ability to sing softly; there was a brittleness, a threadiness. If she hadn't stopped, she would also have lost the ability to sing beyond a narrow series of barked, hoarse notes".

— Juliette Hughes, "Idol Voices", The Age, December 2005.

Timeline of De Vito on the series:

Week #	Song choice	Original artist	Theme (if any)	Result
Top 40	"My Heart Will Go On"	Celine Dion	Semi-final Group 2	Declared Wildcard Finalist
Wildcard	"Predictable"	Delta Goodrem	Wildcard	Declared Top 12 Finalist
Top 12	"Hot Stuff"	Donna Summer	The 1970s	Safe
Top 10	"I Wanna Dance with Somebody"	Whitney Houston	Number One Hits	Safe
Top 8	"When the War Is Over" (Note: De Vito was the first Australian Idol contestant to receive series judge, Mark Holden's "touchdown" for her rendition of "When the War Is Over". De Vito also scored a touchdown from Holden for her performance of "Respect".)	Cold Chisel	Australian Hits	Safe
Top 6	"What's Love Got to Do with It?"	Tina Turner	The 1980s	Safe
Top 5	"I Believe I Can Fly" "Respect"	R. Kelly; Otis Redding	Soul, R&B	Bottom 2
Top 4	"L-O-V-E" "Smile"	Nat King Cole; Charlie Chaplin	Big Band	Safe
Top 3	"You Don't Have to Say You Love Me" "River Deep – Mountain High"	Dusty Springfield; Ike & Tina Turner	The 1960s	Withdrew

=== 2004: Cosima ===
After recovery from her throat nodules, De Vito was unable to negotiate a suitable record deal and funded her own label, (CDV Records) with the financial help of her family. Her managers, Constantine Nellis and Ted Gardner, "took on the singer after she was widely shunned by local record companies". For her independent album, Cosima, she flew to Los Angeles to have ten of its eleven tracks penned by Diane Warren (Celine Dion, Christina Aguilera, and Aerosmith) who commented "When I heard her sing I was blown away ... Cosima is a younger, edgier Celine Dion". On 9 August 2004 her first single, the double A-sided, "When the War Is Over" / "One Night Without You", was released. "When the War Is Over" is a cover of a Cold Chisel ballad and "One Night Without Your" was one of Warren's tracks. It debuted at No. 1 in the ARIA Singles Chart ahead of fellow Australian Idol Paulini's "Angel Eyes" and Australian singer-songwriter, Missy Higgins' "Scar" (both had reached No. 1 earlier). The single was certified platinum by ARIA for shipment of 70,000 units by December 2004. An alternate version of the song, with production similar to her live idol performance, was recorded before working with Diane Warren. This version was not released as the overall sound was different from the rest of the album and so a new version (which was later released as the single) was recorded. On 11 October 2004 her self-titled debut album, Cosima, was released. It debut at No. 2 on the ARIA Albums Chart and No. 1 on the Independent charts. While it was certified gold, for shipment of 35,000 units by ARIA, it quickly left the Top 50 after spending only a few weeks in the charts.

On a 2004 episode of A Current Affair, De Vito was shown writing and recording new material with Warren in Los Angeles. De Vito expressed her disappointment at media reports that declared the throat nodule incident was a publicity stunt. In 2004 De Vito performed "When the War Is Over" on Dancing with the Stars and "Cost of Love" on the Kerri-Anne show; she guested on Good Morning Australia with Bert Newton and performed "When the War Is Over" and "Now That You Can't Have Me". In May that year De Vito was invited to perform at the 30th Anniversary Gala Dinner for then-Prime Minister, John Howard. In December, she released her second single, "Now That You Can't Have Me", which peaked at No. 42. The video for the single was initially popular on Australian music shows such as Video Hits. There were distribution problems and lack of radio airplay. On 23 December, De Vito parted ways with her management team, Nellis and Gardner, who had guided her since the end of Australian Idol. The parties were in dispute over A$500,000, that her managers alleged they were owed. A third single, "Cost of Love" was in the works, with video clip ideas being drawn up. De Vito had extra production work done on the album version – more guitar, heavier drums and re-recorded vocals. Due to legal battles with her previous management, the third single was dropped.

=== 2005–2008: This Is Now ===
By March 2005, De Vito had signed a management deal with Dorry Kordahi of DK Management. According to De Vito, there were still things to be sorted out with her previous management, but she was confident they would turn out well. However, negotiations failed and, from November 2007, Nellis and Gardner appeared in court suing for "breach of contract, claiming lost earnings" while De Vito counter claimed that "the management team were 'negligent' in guiding her career". Since early 2005 De Vito had been in the studio working on her second studio album, This Is Now. During an interview at the ARIA Number One Chart Awards in 2005, she said "I may do it independently, or I may go with a record label. We'll see what happens". On 29 September 2007 the album was released. On it De Vito wrote tracks for the first time; some of which are deeply personal as well as an indication of who she is as an artist. Johann Huang of Mediasearch wrote that "the strongest tracks on the album seem to be the songs Cosima had a hand in writing". One of her self-penned tracks, "Forever Young", was dedicated to her mother.

In October 2005, De Vito previewed some new tracks as support act for United Kingdom soul singer, Roachford on his Australian tour. On 19 March 2006, she appeared in Channel Ten's celebrity quiz show, Australia's Brainiest Musician. During June and July, she completed a national tour with Greek singer, Demis Roussos. De Vito appeared at the Sydney Ferragasto Festival and the Soul Divas show at the Basement in Sydney. On 26 September, De Vito was on 2Day FM breakfast radio's The Kyle and Jackie O Show as the secret celebrity on their "Where Are They Now?" segment. In October, her management announced that her debut single, "When the War Is Over" had re-entered the Australian Independent Charts at No. 11, more than 2 years after it debuted at No. 1 on the ARIA Charts. On 25 November, De Vito headlined at opening of the NBL All Star Game in Adelaide. She sang songs from her new album as well as the national anthem, which was broadcast on FOX Sports.

On 26 January 2007, De Vito headlined a concert at South Juniors Football Club. On 11 February, she sang the national anthem at the Australia vs England Cricket final at the Sydney Cricket Ground in front of 40,000 spectators. Lead single from the album, "Keep It Natural", released on 2 June, showed a rockier edge to her previous works and was written by De Vito and Trevor Steel (singer-songwriter for The Escape Club); it became popular at gay nightclubs across Australia. On 22 February, she debuted "Keep It Natural" at the half time entertainment for the NBL's Sydney Kings v Brisbane Bullets game at the Sydney Entertainment Centre. The album did not chart on the Australian ARIA charts. In October the second single, "Movin' On", also failed to chart despite positive reviews. She appeared on Kerri-Anne and performed "Keep It Natural", as well as on Channel 9's Today Show and the Morning Show hosted by Kylie Gillies and Larry Emdur. De Vito has been a regular guest on the Susie Show where she performed the track "Never Be a Woman in Chains" and displayed her heritage when she cooked an Italian dish. "Keep It Natural" peaked at No. 30 on the ARIA Club Charts and No. 3 on the ARIA Physical Singles Chart and No. 112 on the ARIA Singles Chart. It peaked at No. 4 on the Australian Independent Charts also for 8 weeks. In May, De Vito performed the role of Mother Nature in the Perth production of the rock musical, Hair, to critical acclaim with Rob Mills, Cle Wotton and Nikki Webster. This production was directed by Chris Kabay with musically director, Simon Holt, of Yellow Glass Theatre. Jessica Clayden of the 3rd Degree website approved of the former Australian Idol contestants, "De Vito and Wooten shine during their musical numbers and leave the audience wanting to hear more, so much so that you find yourself looking to the on stage balcony to wait for Cosima to appear and belt out another tune. Her rendition of 'Aquarius' will send chills down your spine". In October she launched her album at the Sleaze Ball as the headlining act.

De Vito shot a video for "Movin' On", which was premiered on music video programs in Australia. It was released in October and was placed on Joy FM's latest Album Volume 5 alongside tracks from Australian Idol's Marcia Hines (judge) and Ricki Lee Coulter (contestant). In March 2008 De Vito headlined Gay Fair Day in Sydney. This Is Now includes "Never Be a Woman in Chains"; and "Left Waiting" written by the Veronicas. De Vito travelled to Melbourne for World Aids Day. In July, in Brisbane she undertook an "up close and personal" video documentary leading up to a live stage performance at The Beat Megaclub for a DVD release. Christian Bowman and Shane Tyler Greaves from Stage Addiction worked with De Vito to produce the film. In August De Vito appeared as a guest on Channel 9's This Is Your Life to pay tribute to fellow Australian Idol contestant, Shannon Noll. She appeared with 2003 winner, Guy Sebastian, where it was revealed that her withdrawal from the competition gave the green light for Noll to compete against Sebastian in the grand final.

=== 2009–present: later events ===
By April 2009 De Vito was a sponsor for Girls with a Purpose, a program by charity organisation, Lifehouse Project, to address issues of concern for 13- to 18-year-old girls: "body image, family conflict and coping with stress". In May De Vito lost her long running legal battle with former managers, Nellis and Gardner, and was ordered to pay Nellis $30,000, plus $7,000 legal fees. Supreme Court of New South Wales Justice Nigel Rein, ruled in the case, CN Presents Pty Ltd v De Vito [2009] NSWSC 388, that De Vito should pay Nellis and stated, "[i]t does seem his work was minimal but it was his idea and he prepared a budget or proposal". The claim of $500,000 for breach of management contract or lost royalties was denied. In June De Vito told New Idea's Jenny Brown, "It's been a huge challenge, emotionally and financially... I was very green. I had no idea how to put an album together, so I relied on my managers. I should have trusted my own instincts". During late 2009 to early 2010 she undertook a solo Tribute to the Divas show featuring work by Barbra Streisand, Aretha Franklin, Shirley Bassey, Whitney Houston and Celine Dion. De Vito has performed songs in Italian at festivals.

On 10 October 2012 De Vito released a new single "Right Here Right Now". It was produced by male and female DJ duo Tho$e Deejayz. On 1 December 2012 she released a version of "O Holy Night".

On 5 November 2013, and to celebrate 10 years since her Australian Idol appearance, DeVito released a cover of Donna Summers "Hot Stuff", a song she performed on the show.

In 2023, De Vito returned to the music industry, and collaborated with Greg Gould to release a cover of "I Want to Spend My Lifetime Loving You".

In October 2025, De Vito was announced as a contestant for the forthcoming third season of The Traitors Australia, set to appear alongside for Australian Idol judge Ian 'Dicko' Dickson. The season will air on Network 10 in 2026.

== Discography ==
=== Albums ===
Title	Album details	Peak chart positions	Certifications (sales threshold)
Title	Album details	AUS	Certifications (sales threshold)
Cosima	Released: 11 October 2004; Label: CDV	2	ARIA: Gold
This Is Now	Released: 29 September 2007; Label: Independent	—	
"—" denotes releases that did not chart or were not released in that country.

=== Singles ===
Year	Title	Peak chart positions	Certifications (sales thresholds)	Album
Year	Title	AUS	Certifications (sales thresholds)	Album
2004	"When the War Is Over" / "One Night Without You"	1	ARIA: Platinum	Cosima
2004	"Now That You Can't Have Me"	42		Cosima
2007	"Keep It Natural"	73		This Is Now
2007	"Movin' On"	—		This Is Now
2012	"Right Here, Right Now"	—		Non-album singles
2012	"O Holy Night"	—		Non-album singles
2013	"Hot Stuff"	—		Non-album singles
2017	"My Grown Up Christmas List"	—		Non-album singles
2018	"The Power of Love"	—		Non-album singles
2020	"I Will (Take You There)" (with Daniel Tambasco)	—		Non-album singles
2023	"I Want to Spend My Lifetime Loving You" (with Greg Gould)	—		Non-album singles
2024	"Don't You Wanna Stay" (with Shannon Noll)	—		That's What I'm Talking About
"—" denotes a recording that did not chart or was not released in that territory.
