= Ms. Vanity =

Single by Rob Mills

from the album Up All Night
- Released: 2004
- Recorded: 2004
- Genre: Pop
- Label: Sony BMG
- Songwriter(s): Jim Marr; Tony Vincent; Matthew Gerrard
- Producer(s): Matthew Gerrard

Rob Mills singles chronology
"Ms. Vanity" (2004)	"Every Single Day" (2004)

"Ms. Vanity" is the debut single by former Australian Idol contestant Rob Mills. "Ms. Vanity" was released as the lead single from Mills's debut album Up All Night, and peaked at number 6 on the Australian ARIA Singles Chart.

== Track listing ==
1. "Ms. Vanity" – 3:45
2. "The Music" – 3:10
3. "Ms. Vanity" (video)

== Charts ==
Chart performance for "Ms. Vanity"
Chart (2004)	Peak position
Australia (ARIA)	6

== Certifications ==
Certifications for "Ms. Vanity"
Region	Certification	Certified units/sales
Australia (ARIA)	Gold	35,000^{^}
^{^} Shipments figures based on certification alone.
