= Prue MacSween =

Australian journalist

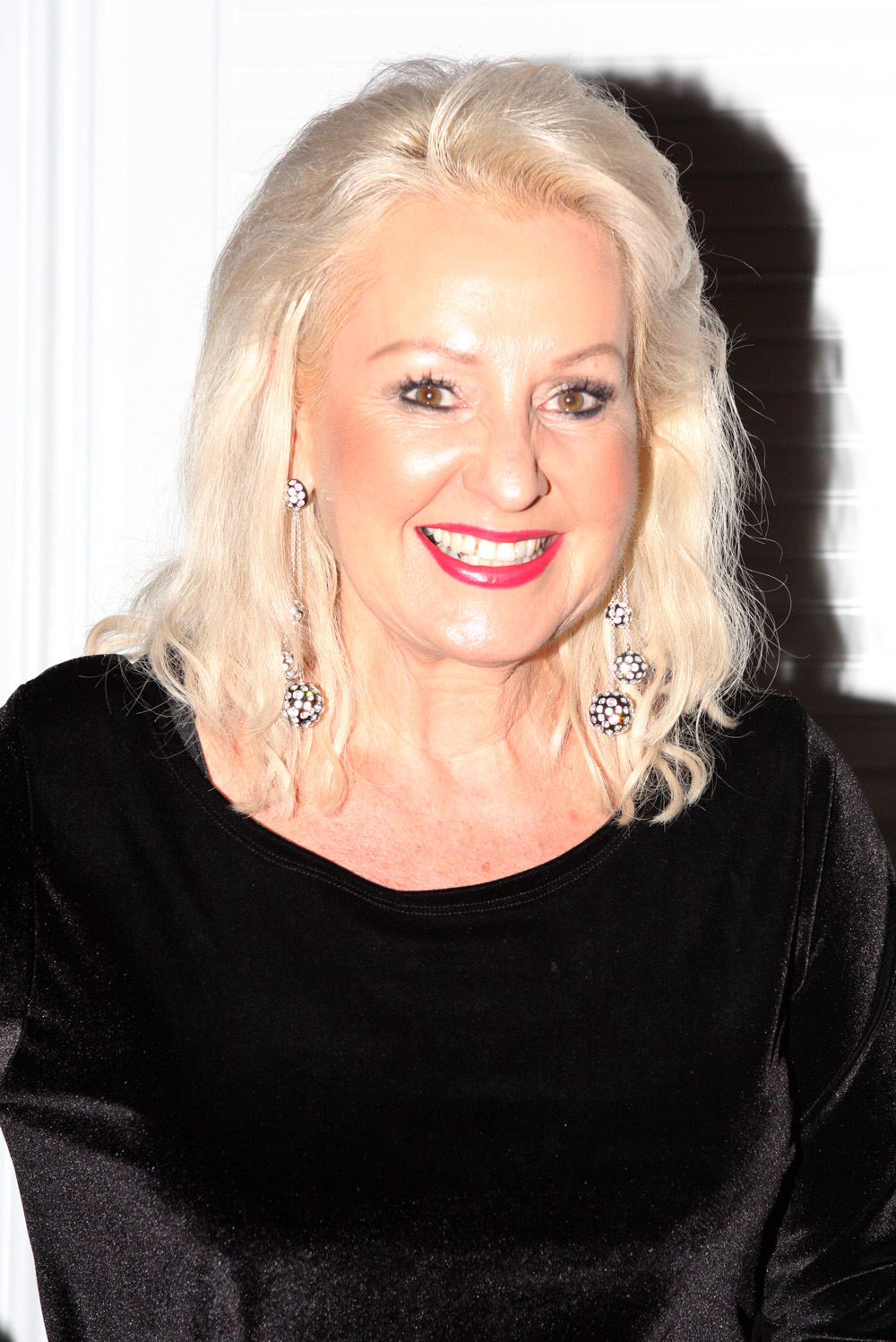
- MacSween in 2013
- Born: Prudence Gay MacSween; Australia
- Education: Sydney Technical College
- Occupations: Television personality; radio personality; author; journalist; commentator
- Known for: Beauty and the Beast (TV show)
- Notable work: Seven Network news reporter and hostess at station TNQ-7; Nine Network news reporter in Sydney and Perth; New Idea; Editor of TV Week; Radio broadcaster at 2UE
- Title: Public relations director of Verve Communications

Prudence Gay MacSween is an Australian television and radio presenter, reporter, social commentator, and public relations director. She has made a number of comments considered to be controversial.

== Career ==
MacSween's extensive career in the media began at Eastern Suburbs Newspapers, as a cadet journalist. during which time she studied at the Sydney Technical College where she completed an Advertising Certificate in 1972.

Her first foray into television was after she successfully applied for a job at the locally owned television station TNQ-7 in the North Queensland city of Townsville initially working as a reporter before also hosting a children's program. Also while at TNQ-7, MacSween created a weekly talk show at TNQ which she also presented. While working in Townsville, MacSween was offered a job with the Nine Network in their Sydney newsroom, before she became a reporter in 1976 on the network's daytime current affairs program No Man's Land in Melbourne.

Following a brief period with the Nine Network in Perth, MacSween moved back to Sydney to work for Are Media (then named Southdown Press) publisher of magazine's New Idea and TV Week, eventually becoming the New South Wales editor for TV Week.

MacSween was a briefly judge on Network Ten's short-lived talent show You're a Star, in 1982 hosted by Tim Webster before being 'unceremoniously dumped'. In 1986, MacSween founded her own public relations business, Prue MacSween & Associates (PMA), which focused on the promotion and marketing of fortified wine products.

MacSween is arguably best known for being one of the "beauties" on a Foxtel revival of daytime panel discussion program Beauty and the Beast, which aired from 1996 until 2002, hosted by Stan Zemanek and then Doug Mulray.

In 2003, MacSween wrote a biography for fellow Beauty and the Beast panellist, Carlotta entitled I'm Not That Kind of Girl. MacSween's book was used for reference by the producers of the ABC's 2014 telemovie about Carlotta's life.

When Zemanek left his 2UE radio program in December 2006, MacSween was appointed the show's replacement, but later decided to leave the program and was later replaced by Stuart Bocking. MacSween continued to work for 2UE in an occasional capacity and in 2012 was reportedly in negotiations with the station to become the co-host of 2UE's morning program with Tracey Spicer. Both MacSween and Spicer reportedly rejected the pay deal offered by 2UE to do the show.

MacSween competed against fellow celebrities Josh Thomas, Chloe Maxwell and Kris Smith on the first episode of Celebrity Come Dine With Me Australia on Lifestyle in December 2012. In 2013, MacSween competed with thirteen other celebrities on the third series of The Celebrity Apprentice Australia on the Nine Network. MacSween was the sixth-last person to be "fired" after having raised $50,000 for the Victor Chang Cardiac Research Institute.

MacSween is currently a director at her own public relations firm, Verve Communications.

=== Controversies ===
MacSween caused offence during an appearance on Seven Network's Weekend Sunrise in 2010 for using the word "retard". A fortnight later, MacSween and the program apologised for their use of the word.

During an appearance on Seven Network's Sunrise in 2013, MacSween described Australian Prime Minister Kevin Rudd as a "psychopath", prompting complaints from viewers.

In 2017, during an appearance on 2GB's Deplorables program hosted by Chris Smith, MacSween said she would be tempted to run over television presenter Yassmin Abdel-Magied. This prompted Macquarie Media to issue a statement saying the station didn't condone MacSween's comments, while MacSween defended her comments as being satirical and said she believed it was 'tragic' that many Australians had lost their sense of humour, and lamented about no longer being able to 'take the mickey out of people'.

During the 13 March 2018 edition of Sunrise, MacSween appeared on the program's Hot Topics segment – a panel discussion with the show's presenter Samantha Armytage, and Brisbane radio presenter Ben Davis. The trio discussed a newspaper article which had appeared in The Courier-Mail quoting Federal Children's Minister David Gillespie as saying he wanted to relax rules which required at-risk Indigenous children to be placed with other Aboriginal families.

During the discussion, MacSween claimed a lot of children in the Stolen Generation were removed for their own well-being, and perhaps Australia "need to do it again", as removing at-risk children from their homes was a "no brainer". This prompted an investigation by the Australian Communications and Media Authority which ruled the Seven Network had breached the Commercial Television Industry Code of Practice as it provoked serious contempt on the basis of race and contained strong negative generalisations about Indigenous people. The discussion also resulted in a number of protests outside Seven Network's studios in Martin Place and at an outside broadcast on the Gold Coast. In June 2020, Seven Network, and MacSween were sued as a result of this segment.

MacSween has also attracted media attention for comments made on Nine's morning program Today Extra, including about Australian Greens MP Adam Bandt, whom she described as a "little flea" and "a danger to the community and I suspect a danger to his wife" and about Australian tennis player Nick Kyrgios, whom she described as "a spoilt little Greek brat", "a little creep" who "should have been slapped as a child".

== Personal life ==
Her parents were Watson MacSween and Laurette (née Isaacs). Her father died in 1970 when she was 18. During childhood, MacSween underwent hip operations and needed to use a wheelchair. MacSween was diagnosed with breast cancer in March 2014 and subsequently underwent a lumpectomy and chemotherapy treatment.

She is a step mother to three children.

MacSween's charity work includes the Victor Chang Cardiac Research Institute, Save Our Sons, Youth Off The Streets and Cancer Australia.
