= Cosima (album) =

Studio album by Cosima De Vito
- Released: 11 October 2004
- Recorded: 2004
- Genre: Pop
- Length: 37:30
- Label: CDV
- Producers: Khris Kellow, Peter Stengaard

Cosima De Vito chronology
Cosima (2004)	This Is Now (2007)

Cosima is the self-titled debut album by Australian Idol finalist and Australian singer Cosima De Vito, released in 2004 (see 2004 in music). The album features the Cold Chisel-cover and power ballad hit single "When the War Is Over" and songs penned by American songwriter Diane Warren. Originally conceived for the end of 2003, the recording of the album was delayed due to Cosima's acute vocal cord illness.

== Chart performance ==
Upon its debut the album hit number two, very nearly missing the top position. The album missed out on the pole position to Maroon 5's Songs About Jane by a matter of a few hundred copies. While this was a very high debut for an independent artist, the following weeks saw the album drop very quickly until it was out of the Top fifty within a matter of weeks (it dropped to number fourteen in only its second week). In the subsequent weeks, due to the lack of a strong radio single, the album dropped with little to push it up except Cosima's star power.

Despite its short run on the charts, the album has been a consistent seller due to various events Cosima has participated in since its release. To date it has sold over 50,000 copies .

== Track listing ==
All songs written by Diane Warren.

1. "One Night Without You" – 4:52
2. "Cost of Love" – 3:33
3. "Show Me the Way Back to Your Heart" – 3:42
4. "What Kind of World Would This World Be" – 4:31
5. "Painted on My Heart" – 3:33
6. "Now That You Can't Have Me" – 3:25
7. "Too Lost in You" – 4:37
8. "What My Heart Says" – 3:45
9. "I Just Wanna Cry" – 3:46
10. "Taste the Tears" – 3:45

Bonus CD

1. "When the War Is Over" (Steve Prestwich) – 3:48

== Charts ==
Chart (2004)	Peak position
Australian ARIA Albums Chart	2

Chart	Certification	Sales
Australia ARIA	Gold	35,000+

== Personnel ==
- Cosima De Vito – Vocals, background vocals
- Diane Warren – Songwriter, producer
- Khris Kellow – Producer, keyboards, programming
- Peter Stengaard – Producer, keyboards, guitar, bass, percussions, drums, programming, background vocals
- Mario Luccy – Mixing and engineering
- Michael Anthony – Executive producer
- Julie Horton – A&R
- Josh Sklair – Guitars
- Lenny Castro – Percussion
- Thomas Stengaard – Additional programming
- Steve Marcussen – Mastering
- Shelley Roye – Design
- David Anderson – Photography
- Glenn Pokorny – Photography assistant
- Fernando Barraza – Stylist
- Jen Erdahl – Hair and make-up
- Beverley Gay – Hair and make-up
