= When the War Is Over =

1982 single by Cold Chisel

Single by Cold Chisel

from the album Circus Animals
- B-side: "Wild Colonial Boy"
- Released: July 1982
- Genre: Rock
- Length: 4:25
- Label: WEA
- Songwriter: Steve Prestwich
- Producer: Mark Opitz

Cold Chisel singles chronology
"Forever Now" (1982)	"When the War Is Over" (1982)	"Hold Me Tight" / "No Sense" (1983)

"When the War Is Over" is song by Australian band Cold Chisel from their 1982 album Circus Animals. The song was written by drummer Steve Prestwich and issued as the third single from the album, peaking at number 25 on the national singles chart, and also resurfaced in August 2011 due to download sales (peaking at number 82 on the ARIA chart).

In January 2018, as part of Triple M's "Ozzest 100", the 'most Australian' songs of all time, "When the War Is Over" was ranked number 61.

== Background ==
Like many of the songs from "Circus Animals" that were deliberately written to be as different in style as possible from those on the pop-laced East that had preceded it, "When the War is Over" has a distinctly odd structure. The chorus is repeated at the beginning and end of the song, with the verses in the middle. It also deviates from traditional songwriting by featuring the instrumental break and guitar solo between the first and second verse, instead of the more usual arrangement between the second and third. Guitarist Ian Moss sings lead vocal on the first two verses, with the band's regular lead vocalist Jimmy Barnes singing the third, which rises to a crescendo before returning to the quiet, melodic refrain from the beginning of the song, underlined by more soloing from Moss. Despite this unusual arrangement, "When the War is Over" has become one of Cold Chisel's most popular songs and the one that has been covered by more artists than any other. At least five other versions of the song have been recorded, one of which attained number one on the Australian music chart.

Author Prestwich said, "I got the first verse of melody and lyric quite spontaneously, and that, coupled with the verse guitar melody, brought it all together. However, I had to write the middle eight in the studio just prior to it being recorded."

Moss described the song as, "a pretty fine example of Steve's songwriting. It all seems fairly straight ahead and easy when you hear it, like all good things are. It's so simple, but so effective." Don Walker said, "I didn't see the potential in it at the time. I thought, 'another ballad.' Since then, I know from the reaction when we play it live, this is one of the most loved songs that we did."

== Charts ==
Chart (1982)	Peak position
Australia (Kent Music Report)	25

== Certifications ==
Certifications for "When the War Is Over"
Region	Certification	Certified units/sales
New Zealand (RMNZ)	Platinum	30,000^{‡}
^{‡} Sales+streaming figures based on certification alone.

== Little River Band version ==
"When the War Is Over"

Single by Little River Band

from the album No Reins
- Released: December 1986
- Label: Capitol Records

Little River Band singles chronology
"Face in the Crowd" (1986)	"When the War Is Over" (1986)	"Love Is a Bridge" (1988)

Australian band Little River Band recorded a version featuring Prestwich on drums and John Farnham on vocals. This version featured as the theme song to the Australian mini-series Sword of Honour. It was released in December 1986 as the third and final single from the group's ninth studio album, No Reins.

=== Track listing ===
Australian 7" (Capitol Records - CP 1895)
A. "When the War Is Over"
B. "How Many Nights?"

== Cosima De Vito version ==
"When the War Is Over"

Single by Cosima

from the album Cosima
- A-side: "One Night Without You"
- Released: 9 August 2004
- Recorded: 2004
- Studio: Realsongs (Hollywood, California)
- Length: 4:21
- Label: CDV
- Songwriter: Steve Prestwich
- Producers: Khris Kellow, Pete Stengaard

Cosima singles chronology
"When the War Is Over" / "One Night Without You" (2004)	"Now That You Can't Have Me" (2004)

Former Australian Idol contestant Cosima De Vito released a version of the song as a double A-side with the track "One Night Without You" on 9 August 2004. She had previously performed the song on the Australian Made episode of the program.

De Vito's version presented an acoustic-guitar and string driven theme as opposed to the strong guitar and drums of the original. It received very limited airplay on mainstream radio stations. Despite this, it managed to become the first independently recorded and released single to debut at number one on the ARIA Singles Chart and was also the best selling independent Australian single for 2004. The release stayed in the top five for over a month and was certified platinum for shipments of over 70,000 units.

=== Track listing ===
Australian CD single

1. "When the War Is Over" – 3:47
2. "One Night Without You" – 4:21
3. "When the War Is Over" (acoustic version) – 3:45
4. "One Night Without You" (extended mix) – 4:52

=== Charts ===
==== Weekly charts ====
Chart (2004)	Peak position
Australia (ARIA)	1

==== Year-end charts ====
Chart (2004)	Position
Australia (ARIA)	37

=== Certifications ===
Region	Certification	Certified units/sales
Australia (ARIA)	Platinum	70,000^{^}
^{^} Shipments figures based on certification alone.

== Other versions ==
Farnham recorded the track a second time as a bonus for the re-release of his 1988 album Age of Reason.

British hard rock band Uriah Heep recorded a version of the song for their seventeenth studio album Raging Silence.

Something for Kate covered "When the War is Over" on the 2007 tribute album Standing on the Outside: The Songs of Cold Chisel.

John Schumann and the Vagabond Crew covered the song on their 2008 album Behind the Lines.
