= Now That You Can't Have Me =

Single by Cosima

from the album Cosima
- Released: December 2004
- Recorded: 2004
- Genre: Pop
- Length: 3:25
- Label: CDV Records
- Songwriter: Diane Warren
- Producer: Khris Kellow

Cosima singles chronology
| "When the War Is Over/One Night Without You" (2004) | "Now That You Can't Have Me" (2004) | "Keep It Natural" (2007) |

"Now That You Can't Have Me" is the second and final single from Cosima De Vito's self-titled debut album, Cosima. Released in December 2004 following the success of "When the War Is Over", the single peaked at number forty-two on the ARIA Charts.

== About the record ==
"Now That You Can't Have Me" was penned by songwriter Diane Warren and was produced by Khris Kellow (who produced Christina Aguilera's debut album). It was said that when Cosima first heard the song, she believed it was destined for her.

The song is the sultry ode of a woman who no longer wants her ex-lover back. The chorus says "Now that you can't have me, that's when you want me. But baby, it's too late, time to set the record straight." The song is woman-empowering and documents the heartache of a relationship breakdown before refusing to accept her ex-lover's apology.

== Reception ==
"Now That You Can't Have Me" proved to be an unsuccessful single. There was much controversy among Cosima fans at the time that mainstream radio refused to play the song. Indeed, some radio stations labelled the song 'unsuitable' and not 'radio-friendly'. The song peaked at number forty-two on its debut and dropped out of the Top fifty thereafter, and spent eight weeks in the top one hundred.

== Music video ==
The music video for "Now That You Can't Have Me" was directed by Paul Joseph Sullivan and showed a different side to Cosima's image. Revealing a sultry, mysterious side, the clip used lots of shadows and lightning to heighten the dramatic effect. Cosima appears at a time in a dark room with candles, suggesting witchcraft. The music video was initially very popular on shows such as Video Hits and was on high rotation.

== Track listing ==
1. "Now That You Can't Have Me" - 3:27
2. "Now That You Can't Have Me" (Club Remix) - 8:33

== Charts ==
| Chart (2004) | Peak position |
|---|---|
| Australian ARIA Singles Chart | 42 |
| Australasian Singles Chart | 15 |
