= Shannon Noll discography =

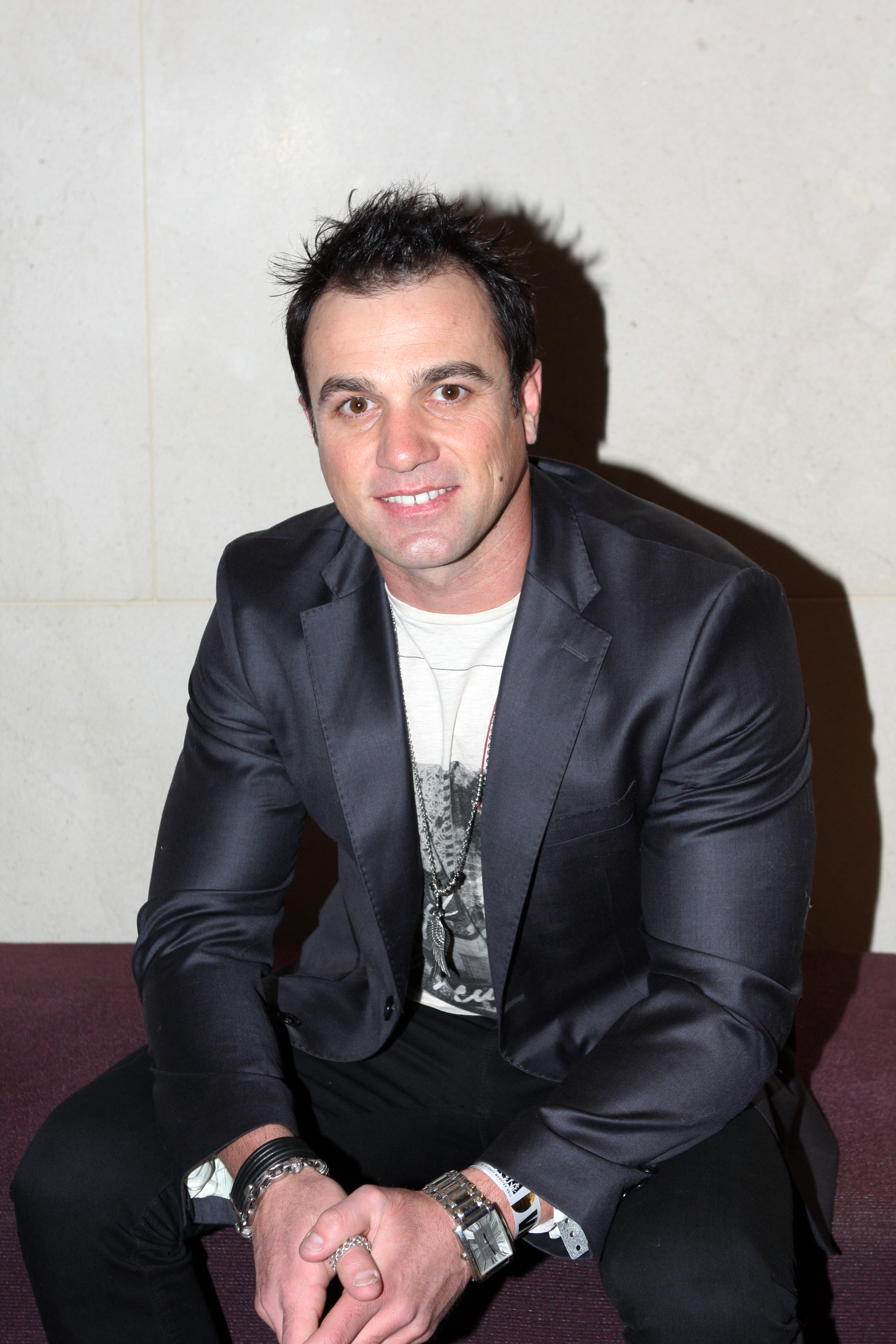
- Noll in 2011
- Studio albums: 7
- Compilation albums: 2
- Singles: 340
- Video albums: 1
- Music videos: 18

The discography of Shannon Noll, an Australian rock singer-songwriter, consists of seven studio albums, two compilation albums, forty singles (including seven as a featured artist) and one DVD. Noll came to fame in 2003 on the first season of Australian Idol and was runner-up to Guy Sebastian. He was subsequently signed to Sony BMG Australia and released the Moving Pictures classic "What About Me" which became the highest selling single of 2004. His debut album That's What I'm Talking About was a number one, multi-platinum seller, as was his 2005 follow-up Lift.

In 2007, Noll released his third album Turn It Up which reached number three and attained platinum certification, and he achieved his tenth consecutive top ten single, a record not reached by any other male Australian artist in Australian chart history. Sebastian, John Farnham and Jimmy Barnes have all achieved more top ten singles, but they were nonconsecutive. Since 2007 Noll has released nine further singles with three reaching the top fifty, the highest charting one peaking at number 26. He released a compilation album No Turning Back: The Story So Far in September 2008 which peaked at number seven. Noll left Sony at the end of 2009, and was signed to Universal Music Australia in 2010. In October 2011 he released his fourth studio album A Million Suns which reached number eight. As of October 2011, Noll has achieved eighteen platinum and four gold certifications for albums and singles.

== Albums ==
=== Studio albums ===
List of studio albums, with selected chart positions and certifications
Title	Album details	Peak chart positions		Certifications
Title	Album details	AUS	NZ	Certifications
That's What I'm Talking About	Released: 9 February 2004; Label: BMG; Formats: CD, digital download	1	31	ARIA: 5× Platinum
Lift	Released: 16 October 2005; Label: Sony BMG; Formats: CD, digital download	1	—	ARIA: 3× Platinum
Turn It Up	Released: 15 September 2007; Label: Sony BMG; Formats: CD, digital download	3	—	ARIA: Platinum
A Million Suns	Released: 14 October 2011; Label: Universal Music; Formats: CD, digital download	8	—	
Unbroken	Released: 2 February 2018; Label: Warner Music Australia; Formats: CD, digital download	7	—	
Raw	Released: 28 May 2021; Label: Red Dog; Formats: CD, digital download	3	—	
The Road in Front of Me	Released: 25 September 2026; Label: Shannon Noll; Formats: CD, digital download	14	—	
"—" denotes releases that did not chart or were not released in that country.

=== Compilation albums ===
List of compilation albums, with selected chart positions
Title	Album details	Peak chart positions
Title	Album details	AUS
No Turning Back: The Story So Far	Released: 27 September 2008; Label: Sony BMG; Formats: CD, digital download	7
What Matters the Most	Released: 1 May 2009 (United Kingdom); Label: RCA; Formats: CD, digital download	—N/a
"—" denotes releases that did not chart.

=== Video albums ===
List of video albums, with selected chart positions and certifications
Title	Album details	Peak chart positions	Certifications
Title	Album details	AUS DVD	Certifications
Up Close	Released: 1 October 2004; Label: BMG; Format: DVD	2	ARIA: Platinum

== Singles ==
=== As lead artist ===
List of singles as a lead artist, with selected chart positions and certifications
Title	Year	Peak chart positions			Certifications	Album
Title	Year	AUS	IRE	NZ	Certifications	Album
"What About Me"	2004	1	2	10	ARIA: 4× Platinum	That's What I'm Talking About
"Drive"	2004	4	—	—	ARIA: Platinum	That's What I'm Talking About
"Learn to Fly"	2004	1	—	—	ARIA: Gold	That's What I'm Talking About
"C'mon Aussie C'mon"	2004	2	—	—	ARIA: Platinum	Non-album single
"Shine"	2005	1	—	—	ARIA: Platinum	Lift
"Lift"	2005	10	—	—	ARIA: Gold	Lift
"Now I Run"	2006	6	—	—		Lift
"Lonely"	2006	8	—	—		Lift
"Don't Give Up" (with Natalie Bassingthwaighte)	2006	2	—	—	ARIA: Platinum	Home: Songs of Hope & Journey
"Loud"	2007	3	—	—		Turn It Up
"In Pieces"	2007	26	—	—		Turn It Up
"Everybody Needs a Little Help"	2008	—	—	—		Turn It Up
"Summertime"	2008	54	—	—		No Turning Back: The Story So Far
"Switch Me On"	2011	42	—	—	ARIA: Gold	A Million Suns
"My Place in the Line"	2011	—	—	—		A Million Suns
"Living in Stereo"	2012	—	—	—		A Million Suns
"Rewind"	2012	—	—	—		A Million Suns
"Man I Can Trust"	2012	—	—	—		Non-album singles
"We Only Live Once"	2014	—	—	—		Non-album singles
"Who I Am"	2016	56	—	—		Unbroken
"Southern Sky"	2017	—	—	—		Unbroken
"Land of Mine"	2018	—	—	—		Unbroken
"Lean on Me"	2018	—	—	—		Non-album single
"Long Live the Summer"	2019	—	—	—		Raw
"Wonderful"	2020	—	—	—		Raw
"Better"	2021	—	—	—		Raw
"Take Me Away"	2022	—	—	—		Non-album singles
"What About Me" (remix) (with Sunset Bros)	2022	—	—	—		Non-album singles
"Believe It"	2023	—	—	—		Non-album singles
"Don't You Wanna Stay" (with Cosima De Vito)	2024	—	—	—		That's What I'm Talking About (20th anniversary edition)
"What Ya Made Of"	2025	—	—	—		The Road in Front of Me
"The Future"	2026	—	—	—		The Road in Front of Me
"Older"	2026	—	—	—		The Road in Front of Me
"—" denotes releases that did not chart or were not released in that country.	2026					

=== As featured artist ===
List of singles as a featured artist, with selected chart positions and certifications
Title	Year	Peak chart positions	Certifications	Album
Title	Year	AUS	Certifications	Album
"Rise Up" (with Australian Idol Top 12)	2003	1	ARIA: Gold	Australian Idol: The Final 12
"Twelve Days of Christmas" (with Dreamtime Christmas All-Stars)	2004	26		Non-album single
"Solid Rock" (Street Warriors featuring Shannon Noll)	2009	—		Unstoppable Force
"Island of Oceans" (John Williamson featuring Shannon Noll)	2010	—		Absolute Greatest: 40 Years True Blue
"Spirit of the Anzacs" (Lee Kernaghan featuring Guy Sebastian, Sheppard, Jon Stevens, Jessica Mauboy, Shannon Noll and Megan Washington)	2015	32		Spirit of the Anzacs
"Find Our Way" (Southbound featuring Shannon Noll)	2020	—		Non-album single
"You Stopped Making Sense" (Darlinghurst featuring Shannon Noll)	2021	—		Darlinghurst
"—" denotes releases that did not chart.

== Other appearances ==
List of other non-single song appearances
Title	Year	Album
"Starting All Over Again"	2003	Australian Idol: The Final 12
"Please Come Home for Christmas" (with Natalie Bassingthwaighte)	2007	The Spirit of Christmas 2007
"It's All Over Now" (with Adam Harvey)	2009	Both Sides Now
"Galleries of Pink Galahs" (with John Williamson)	2010	Absolute Greatest: 40 Years True Blue
"Beyond These City Lights" (with Jayne Denham)	2013	Renegade

== Music videos ==
List of music videos
Title	Year	Director(s)
"What About Me"	2004	Anthony Rose
"Drive"	2004	Anthony Rose
"Learn to Fly"	2004	
"Shine"	2005	Anthony Rose
"Lift"	2005	Anthony Rose
"Now I Run"	2006	Anthony Rose
"Lonely"	2006	Anthony Rose
"Don't Give Up"	2006	Mark Bliss
"Loud"	2007	Anthony Rose
"In Pieces"	2007	Jamie Hilton
"Summertime"	2008	Dan Krige
"Solid Rock"	2009	Matthew Chuang
"Switch Me On"	2011	Benn Jae
"My Place in the Line"	2011	Benn Jae
"Living in Stereo"	2012	Josef Weber
"We Only Live Once"	2014	Jake Weisz
"Spirit of the Anzacs"	2015	
"Who I Am"	2016	Renny Wijeyamohan
"Southern Sky"	2017	Renny Wijeyamohan
"You Stopped Making Sense" (with Darlinghurst)	2021	
