= No Turning Back: The Story So Far =

Greatest hits album by Shannon Noll
- Released: 27 September 2008
- Recorded: 2003–2008
- Genre: Rock, pop
- Label: Sony BMG

Shannon Noll chronology
Turn It Up (2007)	No Turning Back: The Story So Far (2008)	What Matters the Most (2009)

Singles from No Turning Back: The Story So Far
- 1. "Summertime" Released: 23 August 2008

No Turning Back: The Story So Far is the first compilation album by Shannon Noll. The album includes tracks from Noll's three studio albums to date, That's What I'm Talking About (2004), Lift (2005) and Turn It Up (2008) and five brand new tracks. The album was released in September 2008 and peaked at number 7 on the ARIA Charts, becoming Noll's fourth consecutive top ten album.

Upon released, Noll said "It was only once we started talking about the idea that it sank in how many singles there's been, from "What About Me" right through to "Loud" and "In Pieces". All these songs mean so much to me and showcase a journey that I've been through with my songwriting and recording, my career in general. It's great to have the new songs on the album, as they are just a taste of what we've got planned for next year!"

== Singles ==
The first single taken from the album was "Summertime", which was originally by 2007 Canadian Idol Brian Melo. The track peaked at number 54 on the ARIA Chart.

== Track listing ==
1. "Summertime" (Andy Stochansky, Greg Johnston) – 3:42
2. "Shine" (Matthew Gerrard, Andy Stochansky) – 3:34
3. "Lift" (Adam Reily, Bryon Jones, Andrew Roachford, Shannon Noll) – 3:56
4. "Lonely" (Adam Reily, Shannon Noll) – 4:42
5. "Now I Run" (Peter Gordeno, Chris Porter, Shannon Noll) – 3:44
6. "What About Me" (Garry Frost, Frances Swan) – 3:21
7. "Drive" (Phil Thornalley, Bryan Adams) – 3:58
8. "Learn to Fly" (Peter Gordeno, Rick Mitra, Christian Ingebrigtsen, Chris Porter)
9. "Don't Give Up" (with Natalie Bassingthwaighte) (Peter Gabriel) – 4:40
10. "Loud" (Andy Stochansky, James Michael) – 3:10
11. "In Pieces" (Bobby Huff, Eric Silver) – 3:32
12. "Tomorrow" (Shannon Noll, Anthony Egizii, David Musumeci) – 3:57
13. "No Turning Back" (Luke Ebbin, Shannon Noll, Curt Schneider) – 3:43
14. "Crash" (Adam Reily, Dave Leslie, Shannon Noll) – 3:21
15. "You're Never Alone" (Reed Vertelney, Lindy Robbins, Shannon Noll) – 5:01
16. "Sorry Is Just Too Late" (featuring Kari Kimmel) (iTunes exclusive bonus track) – 3:54

Disc 2 (DVD edition)

1. "What About Me"
2. "Drive"
3. "Learn to Fly"
4. "Lonely"
5. "Shine"
6. "Lift"
7. "Now I Run"
8. "Loud"
9. "In Pieces"
10. "Don't Give Up" (with Natalie Bassingthwaighte)

== Omissions ==
The compilation omits the following singles:

- "Rise Up" with Australian Idol Top 12 (2003) – was a collaborative single and is not considered part of Noll's official discography.
- "New Beginning" (2004) – was a radio-only single release from That's What I'm Talking About.
- "C'mon Aussie C'mon" (2004) – was a charity single only.
- "Twelve Days of Christmas" with Dreamtime Christmas All-Stars (2004) – was a collaborative single and is not considered part of Noll's official discography.
- "Everybody Needs a Little Help" (2008) – was a radio-only single release from Turn It Up.

== Charts ==
=== Weekly charts ===
Chart (2008)	Peak position
Australian Albums (ARIA)	7

=== Year-end charts ===
Chart (2008)	Position
Australian Artist Albums Chart	48

== Release history ==
Region	Date	Format(s)	Label	Catalog	Ref.
Australia	15 September 2007	CD + DVD; digital download	Sony BMG	88697385282	
