= So Fresh: The No. 1 Hits =

So Fresh: The #1 Hits

Compilation album by Various artists
- Released: 17 May 2008
- Genre: Pop
- Label: Sony BMG

So Fresh chronology
So Fresh: The Hits of Autumn 2008 (2008)	So Fresh: The #1 Hits (2008)	So Fresh: The Hits of Winter 2008 (2008)

So Fresh: The #1 Hits is a compilation of songs which have peaked at #1 on the Australian ARIA Singles Chart in various years, released on 17 May 2008.

== Track listing ==
=== Disc 1 ===
1. Avril Lavigne – "Girlfriend" (3:36)
2. Gwen Stefani – "What You Waiting For?" (3:43)
3. Alien Ant Farm – "Smooth Criminal" (3:27)
4. Akon – "Lonely" (3:34)
5. Fergie – "Big Girls Don't Cry" (4:32)
6. Justin Timberlake – "Rock Your Body" (4:27)
7. Pink – "Most Girls" (5:00)
8. Chris Brown – "Run It!" (3:15)
9. Britney Spears – "Toxic" (3:20)
10. The Pussycat Dolls – "Don't Cha" (4:03)
11. Usher – "Burn" (4:17)
12. Christina Aguilera – "Beautiful" (4:00)
13. TV Rock featuring Seany B – "Flaunt It" (3:30)
14. NSYNC – "Bye Bye Bye" (3:21)
15. Backstreet Boys – "Incomplete" (3:59)
16. The Black Eyed Peas – "Shut Up" (5:10)
17. Mýa – "Case of the Ex" (3:53)
18. Outkast – "Roses" (4:15)
19. 2Pac featuring Elton John – "Ghetto Gospel" (3:59)

=== Disc 2 ===
1. Wheatus – "Teenage Dirtbag" (4:05)
2. Anastacia – "Left Outside Alone" (4:16)
3. Hinder – "Lips of an Angel" (4:22)
4. Lifehouse – "Hanging by a Moment" (3:36)
5. Lighthouse Family – "High" (4:36)
6. Guy Sebastian – "Angels Brought Me Here" (3:58)
7. Delta Goodrem and Brian McFadden – "Almost Here" (3:47)
8. Vanessa Carlton – "A Thousand Miles" (3:58)
9. Nelly featuring Kelly Rowland – "Dilemma" (4:49)
10. Nitty – "Nasty Girl" (4:08)
11. t.A.T.u. – "All the Things She Said" (3:34)
12. Will Smith – "Switch" (3:18)
13. Shannon Noll – "Learn to Fly" (4:13)
14. Paulini – "Angel Eyes" (4:04)
15. Sandi Thom – "I Wish I Was a Punk Rocker (With Flowers in My Hair)" (2:34)
16. Anthony Callea – "Rain" (3:48)
17. Aqua – "Doctor Jones" (3:23)
18. 50 Cent – "In da Club" (3:12)
19. Afroman – "Because I Got High" (3:20)

== Charts ==
Chart	Peak
ARIA Compilations Chart	1

== Certifications ==
Region	Certification	Certified units/sales
Australia (ARIA)	Gold	35,000^{^}
^{^} Shipments figures based on certification alone.
