= List of best-selling singles of the 2000s in Australia =

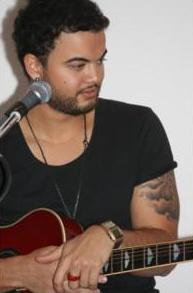
Guy Sebastian's single "Angels Brought Me Here" is the best selling single of the 2000s.

The highest-selling singles in Australia are ranked in the Australian Recording Industry Association singles chart, also known as the ARIA Charts, published by the Australian Recording Industry Association (ARIA). The data are compiled from a sample that includes music stores, music departments at electronics and department stores and Internet sales, in other words, both digital as well as CD sales.

In January 2010, the Australian Recording Industry Association released a chart with the highest selling singles of the previous decade, using data from all 520 ARIA singles charts from 1 January 2000, to 31 December 2009.

The winner of the first season of Australian Idol, Guy Sebastian, had the highest-selling single of the decade, "Angels Brought Me Here", which reached number one on the ARIA singles chart on 1 December 2003, and remained there for 3 weeks. It was followed by "The Prayer" by Anthony Callea, the runner up of the show's second season. It reached number one, and remained there for 5 weeks.

All but 23 of the 100 songs that made the end-of-decade chart reached number one during the decade.

== Top 100 ==
Position	Song title	Artist	Nationality	Year	Peak
1	"Angels Brought Me Here"	Guy Sebastian	Australia	2003	1
2	"The Prayer"	Anthony Callea	Australia	2005	1
3	"I Gotta Feeling"	The Black Eyed Peas	United States	2009	1
4	"Poker Face"	Lady Gaga	United States	2008	1
5	"What About Me"	Shannon Noll	Australia	2004	1
6	"So What"	Pink	United States	2008	1
7	"Lose Yourself"	Eminem	United States	2002	1
8	"Sexy Bitch"	David Guetta featuring Akon	France; United States	2009	1
9	"Sex on Fire"	Kings of Leon	United States	2008	1
10	"Love Story"	Taylor Swift	United States	2009	1
11	"The Ketchup Song (Aserejé)"	Las Ketchup	Spain	2002	1
12	"Just Dance"	Lady Gaga featuring Colby O'Donis	United States	2008	1
13	"Low"	Flo Rida featuring T-Pain	United States	2008	1
14	"Boom Boom Pow"	The Black Eyed Peas	United States	2009	1
15	"I'm Yours"	Jason Mraz	United States	2008	3
16	"Without Me"	Eminem	United States	2002	1
17	"Teenage Dirtbag"	Wheatus	United States	2000	1
18	"Right Round"	Flo Rida featuring Kesha	United States	2009	1
19	"Born to Try"	Delta Goodrem	Australia	2003	1
20	"Dilemma"	Nelly featuring Kelly Rowland	United States	2002	1
21	"Whenever, Wherever"	Shakira	Colombia	2000	1
22	"I Kissed a Girl"	Katy Perry	United States	2008	1
23	"Bleeding Love"	Leona Lewis	United Kingdom	2008	1
24	"Shut Up"	The Black Eyed Peas	United States	2003	1
25	"Apologize"	Timbaland presents OneRepublic	United States	2007	1
26	"All Summer Long"	Kid Rock	United States	2008	1
27	"Use Somebody"	Kings of Leon	United States	2008	1
28	"Sweet About Me"	Gabriella Cilmi	Australia	2008	1
29	"Like It Like That"	Guy Sebastian	Australia	2009	1
30	"Hot n Cold"	Katy Perry	United States	2008	4
31	"Don't Cha"	The Pussycat Dolls featuring Busta Rhymes	United States	2005	1
32	"Halo"	Beyoncé	United States	2009	3
33	"I'm Outta Love"	Anastacia	United States	2000	1
34	"I Wish I Was a Punk Rocker (With Flowers in My Hair)"	Sandi Thom	United Kingdom	2006	1
35	"Where Is the Love?"	The Black Eyed Peas	United States	2003	1
36	"A Little Less Conversation"	Elvis vs. JXL	United States; Netherlands	2002	1
37	"No Air"	Jordin Sparks and Chris Brown	United States	2008	1
38	"Shake It"	Metro Station	United States	2008	2
39	"Single Ladies (Put a Ring on It)"	Beyoncé	United States	2009	5
40	"Meet Me Halfway"	The Black Eyed Peas	United States	2009	1
41	"Left Outside Alone"	Anastacia	United States	2004	1
42	"Tik Tok"	Kesha	United States	2009	1
43	"Predictable"	Delta Goodrem	Australia	2003	1
44	"Big Girls Don't Cry"	Fergie	United States	2007	1
45	"Hero"	Enrique Iglesias	Spain	2002	1
46	"Can't Fight the Moonlight"	LeAnn Rimes	United States	2001	1
47	"These Kids"	Joel Turner and the Modern Day Poets	Australia	2004	1
48	"Smooth Criminal"	Alien Ant Farm	United States	2001	1
49	"Lonely"	Akon	United States	2005	1
50	"Say My Name"	Destiny's Child	United States	2000	1
51	"Black Betty"	Spiderbait	Australia	2004	1
52	"Axel F"	Crazy Frog	Sweden	2005	1
53	"When I Grow Up"	The Pussycat Dolls	United States	2008	1
54	"Get Shaky"	The Ian Carey Project	United States	2009	3
55	"In da Club"	50 Cent	United States	2003	1
56	"Freestyler"	Bomfunk MC's	Finland	2000	1
57	"The Last Day on Earth"	Kate Miller-Heidke	Australia	2009	3
58	"Can't Get You Out of My Head"	Kylie Minogue	Australia	2001	1
59	"Bring Me to Life"	Evanescence	United States	2003	1
60	"Don't Stop the Music"	Rihanna	Barbados	2008	1
61	"You Found Me"	The Fray	United States	2009	1
62	"It Wasn't Me"	Shaggy featuring Ricardo "RikRok" Ducent	Jamaica; United Kingdom	2001	1
63	"SexyBack"	Justin Timberlake	United States	2006	1
64	"Angel"	Shaggy	Jamaica	2001	1
65	"Over and Over"	Nelly featuring Tim McGraw	United States	2005	1
66	"Girlfriend"	Avril Lavigne	Canada	2007	1
67	"Umbrella"	Rihanna featuring Jay-Z	Barbados; United States	2007	1
68	"How You Remind Me"	Nickelback	Canada	2001	2
69	"Lost Without You"	Delta Goodrem	Australia	2003	1
70	"A Thousand Miles"	Vanessa Carlton	United States	2002	1
71	"Viva la Vida"	Coldplay	United Kingdom	2008	2
72	"Forever"	Chris Brown	United States	2008	7
73	"Jai Ho! (You Are My Destiny)"	A.R. Rahman and The Pussycat Dolls featuring Nicole Scherzinger	India; United States	2009	1
74	"Hey Ya!"	Outkast	United States	2004	1
75	"What You Waiting For?"	Gwen Stefani	United States	2004	1
76	"Gives You Hell"	The All-American Rejects	United States	2009	3
77	"4 Minutes"	Madonna featuring Justin Timberlake and Timbaland	United States	2008	1
78	"Paparazzi"	Lady Gaga	United States	2009	2
79	"Untouched"	The Veronicas	Australia	2008	2
80	"Hanging by a Moment"	Lifehouse	United States	2001	1
81	"Live Your Life"	T.I. featuring Rihanna	United States; Barbados	2009	3
82	"The Way I Are"	Timbaland featuring Keri Hilson	United States	2007	1
83	"Groovejet (If This Ain't Love)"	Spiller	Italy	2000	1
84	"The Climb"	Miley Cyrus	United States	2009	5
85	"Not Pretty Enough"	Kasey Chambers	Australia	2002	1
86	"Straight Lines"	Silverchair	Australia	2007	1
87	"Milkshake"	Kelis	United States	2004	2
88	"You Belong with Me"	Taylor Swift	United States	2009	5
89	"Evacuate the Dancefloor"	Cascada	Germany	2009	3
90	"Flaunt It"	TV Rock featuring Seany B	Australia	2006	1
91	"Behind Blue Eyes"	Limp Bizkit	United States	2004	4
92	"Complicated"	Avril Lavigne	Canada	2002	1
93	"I Don't Feel Like Dancin'"	Scissor Sisters	United Kingdom	2006	1
94	"Stan"	Eminem	United States	2001	1
95	"Bye Bye Bye"	'N Sync	United States	2000	1
96	"The Fear"	Lily Allen	United Kingdom	2009	3
97	"Dream Catch Me"	Newton Faulkner	United Kingdom	2008	5
98	"Switch"	Will Smith	United States	2005	1
99	"Never Be the Same Again"	Melanie C	United Kingdom	2000	2
100	"If I Were a Boy"	Beyoncé	United States	2008	3

== See also ==
- List of best-selling albums of the 2000s in Australia
