= So Fresh: The Hits of Autumn 2008 =

Compilation album by various artists
- Released: 29 March 2008
- Genre: Pop
- Label: Sony BMG

So Fresh chronology
So Fresh: The Hits of Summer 2008 (2007)	So Fresh: The Hits of Autumn 2008 (2008)	So Fresh: The No. 1 Hits (2008)

So Fresh: The Hits of Autumn 2008 is a compilation album of songs that were popular in Australia. It was released on 29 March 2008.

== Track listing ==
=== CD ===
1. Leona Lewis – "Bleeding Love" (4:24)
2. Rihanna – "Don't Stop the Music" (4:29)
3. Timbaland featuring OneRepublic – "Apologize" (3:06)
4. Alicia Keys – "No One" (4:15)
5. Chris Brown – "With You" (4:14)
6. Britney Spears – "Piece of Me" (3:32)
7. Soulja Boy – "Crank That (Soulja Boy)" (3:44)
8. Sean Kingston – "Me Love" (3:26)
9. Rogue Traders – "I Never Liked You" (3:29)
10. Delta Goodrem – "Believe Again" (4:08)
11. Maroon 5 – "Won't Go Home Without You" (3:51)
12. Avril Lavigne – "Hot" (3:23)
13. Fergie – "Clumsy" (4:02)
14. Colbie Caillat – "Bubbly" (3:18)
15. Mika – "Big Girl (You Are Beautiful)" (4:08)
16. Powderfinger – "Nobody Sees" (4:13)
17. Shannon Noll – "In Pieces" (3:34)
18. Good Charlotte – "Misery" (3:50)
19. The Presets – "My People" (3:50)
20. Fall Out Boy – "I'm Like a Lawyer with the Way I'm Always Trying to Get You Off (Me & You)" (3:33)

=== DVD ===
1. Leona Lewis – "Bleeding Love"
2. Rihanna – "Don't Stop the Music"
3. Timbaland featuring OneRepublic – "Apologize"
4. Alicia Keys – "No One"
5. Britney Spears – "Piece of Me"
6. Soulja Boy – "Crank That (Soulja Boy)"
7. Sean Kingston – "Me Love"
8. Rogue Traders – "I Never Liked You"
9. Delta Goodrem – "Believe Again"
10. Maroon 5 – "Won't Go Home Without You"
11. Mika – "Big Girl (You Are Beautiful)"
12. Fergie – "Clumsy"

== Charts ==
So Fresh: The Hits of Autumn 2008 peaked at #1 on the ARIA Compilations chart and ended up selling over 140,000 copies to be certified double platinum

== Certifications ==
Region	Certification	Certified units/sales
Australia (ARIA)	2× Platinum	140,000^{^}
^{^} Shipments figures based on certification alone.
