= So Fresh: The Hits of Summer 2008 =

So Fresh: The Hits of Summer 2008 Plus the Best of 2007

Compilation album by various artists
- Released: 26 November 2007
- Genre: Pop
- Label: Sony BMG

So Fresh chronology
So Fresh: The Hits of Spring 2007 (2007)	So Fresh: The Hits of Summer 2008 Plus the Best of 2007 (2007)	So Fresh: The Hits of Autumn 2008 (2008)

So Fresh: The Hits of Summer 2008 Plus the Best of 2007 is a compilation of the latest songs that were popular in Australia. This particular version includes "the best of 2007", featuring the best music from the 2007 So Fresh compilations. It was released on 26 November 2007. The album has been certified 3× Platinum by ARIA, for shipments of 210,000+ and has spent fourteen weeks in the Compilations Top 20.

== Track listing ==
=== CD 1 ===
1. Sean Kingston – "Beautiful Girls" (4:01)
2. Delta Goodrem – "In This Life" (3:46)
3. Gwen Stefani – "Now That You Got It" (3:00)
4. Kanye West – "Stronger" (5:12)
5. Shannon Noll – "Loud" (3:11)
6. will.i.am – "I Got It from My Mama" (4:05)
7. Fall Out Boy – "The Take Over, the Breaks Over" (3:34)
8. Good Charlotte – "Keep Your Hands off My Girl" (3:25)
9. Timbaland featuring Keri Hilson and D.O.E. – "The Way I Are" (3:20)
10. Maroon 5 – "Wake Up Call" (3:20)
11. Powderfinger – "I Don't Remember" (3:40)
12. Rogue Traders – "Don't You Wanna Feel" (3:15)
13. Kelly Clarkson – "One Minute" (3:05)
14. R. Kelly and Usher – "Same Girl" (4:13)
15. Vanessa Amorosi – "Kiss Your Mama!" (3:09)
16. Amy Winehouse – "Rehab" (3:34)
17. Chris Brown – "Wall to Wall" (3:47)
18. Evanescence – "Lithium" (3:43)
19. Daughtry – "It's Not Over" (3:35)
20. The Killers – "Bones" (3:48)

=== CD 2 ===
1. Rihanna – "Shut Up and Drive" (3:34)
2. Britney Spears – "Gimme More" (4:11)
3. Young Divas – "Turn Me Loose" (3:51)
4. Mika – "Happy Ending" (4:33)
5. Pink – "Leave Me Alone (I'm Lonely)" (3:19)
6. Justin Timberlake – "What Goes Around... Comes Around" (5:14)
7. Christina Aguilera – "Candyman" (3:15)
8. Sugababes – "About You Now" (3:33)
9. Hinder – "Lips of an Angel" (4:22)
10. Fergie featuring Ludacris – "Glamorous" (4:08)
11. Akon – "Sorry, Blame It on Me" (4:56)
12. Groove Armada featuring Mutya Buena – "Song 4 Mutya (Out of Control)" (3:39)
13. Mary J. Blige – "Be Without You" (Kendu Mix) (4:06)
14. Backstreet Boys – "Inconsolable" (3:37)
15. Small Mercies – "Innocent" (3:46)
16. Nelly Furtado – "All Good Things (Come to an End)" (5:12)
17. Avril Lavigne – "Girlfriend" (3:37)
18. Ne-Yo – "Because of You" (3:48)
19. TV Rock vs. Dukes of Windsor – "The Others" (3:24)
20. Old Man River – "La" (3:24)

== Charts ==
Chart (2007)	Peak position
Australian ARIA Top 20 Compilations Chart	1

== See also ==
- So Fresh
- 2007 in music
