= Zinc (band) =

- Zinc in 2004. L-R: Adam Ray, Mark O'Shea, John O'Shea

Background information
- Origin: Sydney, New South Wales, Australia
- Genres: Pop rock
- Years active: 2002–2007
- Labels: WEA, Waterfront
- Past members: John O'Shea; Mark O'Shea; Adam Ray

Zinc were an Australian three piece pop rock band, composed of three singer-songwriters: Adam Ray and the O'Shea brothers: John and Mark they formed in 2002. In 2004 the group supported a national tour by Shannon Noll. Their debut single, "The Morning After", was released on WEA Records and reached No. 22 on the ARIA Singles Chart in July 2004. Their debut album, Making Sense of Madness, recorded with Charles Fisher, was released on 6 June 2005. In mid-2005 they supported United States pop group, Hanson, on the Australian leg of their Live and Electric Tour. By 2007 the trio had disbanded.

== History ==
Mark Patrick O'Shea (born c. 1978, Dalby, Queensland) was a solo singer-songwriter and guitarist in Sydney when he worked with fellow singer-songwriter, Adam Matthew Ray (originally from Frankston, Victoria), and the pair started to write and perform together. In 2002 John Barry O'Shea moved from Dalby to join his brother on co-lead vocals, keyboards and guitar and the trio formed a rock pop group, Zinc. In 1996 Mark had released a solo country rock album, None of the Above. From early 2003 Zinc based themselves in Los Angeles for 18 months and worked with Mark Hudson, an American producer, and provided backing vocals for an album by Ringo Starr and one by Steven Tyler.

Their debut single, "The Morning After", was released on WEA Records and reached No. 22 on the ARIA Singles Chart in July 2004. Mark described the track, "[its] about mistakes, regret and inevitability. I woke up one day and remembered all the stupid things that I had said and done the night before. I was in the midst of mouthing the words, 'I will never drink again' when a tiny voice, buried deep, deep, down, behind the jack-hammer in my head, called me a liar. I knew that I would end up drinking again and most probably make very similar, if not in fact the same, mistakes again". It was followed by "Help Me Help Myself" which reached the top 100 in December, peaking at No. 65.

In May 2005 Zinc released their debut album, Making Sense of Madness, which was recorded with Charles Fisher producing. According to Ray, "I think we actually surprise people when we sing ... Generally – even with harmony bands – there is (one) lead singer, But with our band it literally is John one song, Mark the next and me the next; there’s three lead singers. And all three really hold their own". Together with the album they issued their third single, "Inside", which peaked at No. 65 in June. In June and July they supported US pop group, Hanson, on the Australian leg of their Live and Electric Tour. Steve Jones of dBMagazine observed their performance, and described it as "a loose, but nonetheless well-received set. Other than being very talented songwriters that know how to piece together a catchy tune; brothers Mark (acoustic guitar) and John (guitar/keyboards) O'Shea, and their mate Adam Ray (tambourine) also had good looks and all the right moves on their side as they alternated vocal duties". By 2007 the group had disbanded.

== Afterwards ==
In 2007 Mark O'Shea formed a duo, O'Shea, with his wife, Jay, and the following year they issued their debut album, Mr and Mrs.

== Band Members ==
- Mark O'Shea - lead and backing vocals, guitar, piano
- Adam Ray - lead and backing vocals, tambourine
- John O'Shea - lead and backing vocals, guitar, piano

== Discography ==
=== Albums ===
List of studio albums
Title	Album details
Making Sense of Madness	Released: May 2005; Label: Waterfront; Formats: CD, digital download

=== Singles ===
List of singles, with selected chart positions
Title	Year	Peak chart positions	Album
Title	Year	AUS	Album
"The Morning After"	2004	22	Making Sense of Madness
"Help Me Help Myself"	2004	65	Making Sense of Madness
"Inside"	2005	65	Making Sense of Madness

=== As featured artist ===
List of singles with selected Australian chart positions
Title	Year	Peak chart positions
Title	Year	AUS
"Twelve Days of Christmas" (with Dreamtime Christmas All-Stars)	2004	26
