= Todd Williams (disambiguation) =

Todd Williams (born 1971) is a Major League Baseball relief pitcher.

Todd Williams may also refer to:

- Todd Williams (actor) (born 1977), American actor
- Todd Williams (American football) (1978–2014), American football offensive tackle
- Todd Williams (runner) (born 1969), American long-distance runner
- Todd Williams (singer), Australian singer

== See also ==
- Tod Williams (disambiguation)
