= Raw (Shannon Noll album) =

Studio album by Shannon Noll
- Released: 28 May 2021
- Length: 48:39
- Label: Red Dog

Shannon Noll chronology
Unbroken (2018)	Raw (2021)

Singles from Raw
- 1. "Long Live the Summer" Released: 4 November 2019; 2. "Wonderful" Released: 20 November 2020; 3. "Better" Released: 23 April 2021

Raw is the sixth studio album by Australian singer-songwriter Shannon Noll. Upon release, Noll said the album "features some new songs plus new recordings of many of the songs you love hearing at my live shows plus covers of some Aussie classics."

The album was released on 28 May 2021 and was supported by the Raw & Uncovered Australian tour.

== Background ==
In 2020, Shannon Noll toured across New South Wales and performed over 30 intimate and acoustic shows. Following this successful run of shows, fans requested an album based on these shows. The album includes the first song written entirely by Noll.

== Commercial performance ==
Raw debuted at number 3 on the ARIA Charts, #1 on the ARIA Australian Artists Chart and #1 on the ARIA Country Chart, becoming Noll's sixth consecutive top ten studio album.

== Track listing ==
1. "Long Live the Summer" (Shannon Noll, Brett Creswell, Michael Tan) – 4:05
2. "Better" (Noll, Andrew Payne, Tan Steven Tonge) – 3:50
3. "Wise" (Gene Cook, James Kempster, Simon Hosford) – 3:30
4. "Wonderful" (Noll, Daniel Skeed) – 3:23
5. "Alone" (Noll) – 3:30
6. "Lift" (Noll, Bryon Jones, Adam Reilly, Andrew Roachford) – 4:14
7. "Shine" (Matthew Gerrard, Andy Stochansky) – 3:57
8. "Now I Run" (Noll, Peter Gordeno, Chris Porter) – 3:44
9. "Drive" (Bryan Adams, Phil Thornalley)– 4:03
10. "What About Me" (Garry Frost, Frances Swan) – 3:34
11. "Better Be Home Soon" (Neil Finn) – 3:32
12. "Never Tear Us Apart" (Andrew Farriss, Michael Hutchence) – 3:55
13. "Take Me Back" (Jon Stevens, Brent Thomas) – 3:22

== Charts ==
=== Weekly charts ===
Chart performance for Raw
Chart (2021)	Peak position
Australian Albums (ARIA)	3

=== Year-end charts ===
Chart (2021)	Position
Australian Country Albums (ARIA)	1
