= Mark O'Shea (musician) =

- O'Shea in 2010

Background information
- Born: 16 February 1977
- Genre: country
- Occupations: Musician; singer-songwriter
- Instruments: Vocals; Guitar
- Years active: 1993-present
- Labels: ABC Country; Sony
- Member of: O'Shea
- Formerly of: Zinc

Mark O'Shea (born 16 February 1977) is an Australian singer-songwriter. He had a solo career in the 1990s, before forming the band Zinc in 2002. In 2007, he formed O'Shea with his wife Jay.

== Biography ==
=== 1977–2001: Solo career ===
Mark O'Shea was born on 16 February 1977. At the age of 16 in 1993, O'Shea won the Gympie Music Muster talent competition which subsequently led to a record deal with ABC Country.

Mark's debut album None Of The Above was released in 1996 and he won Golden Guitar Awards at the CMAA in 1996 and 1997.

=== 2002–2007: Zinc ===
Mark O'Shea (middle) in 2004 as a member of Zinc

In 2002, Mark formed the rock/pop group Zinc with brother John O'Shea and Adam Ray. The band released one studio album in 2005 and disbanded in 2007.In 2006, Mark toured as a guitarist for Ronn Moss.

=== 2007–present: O'Shea ===
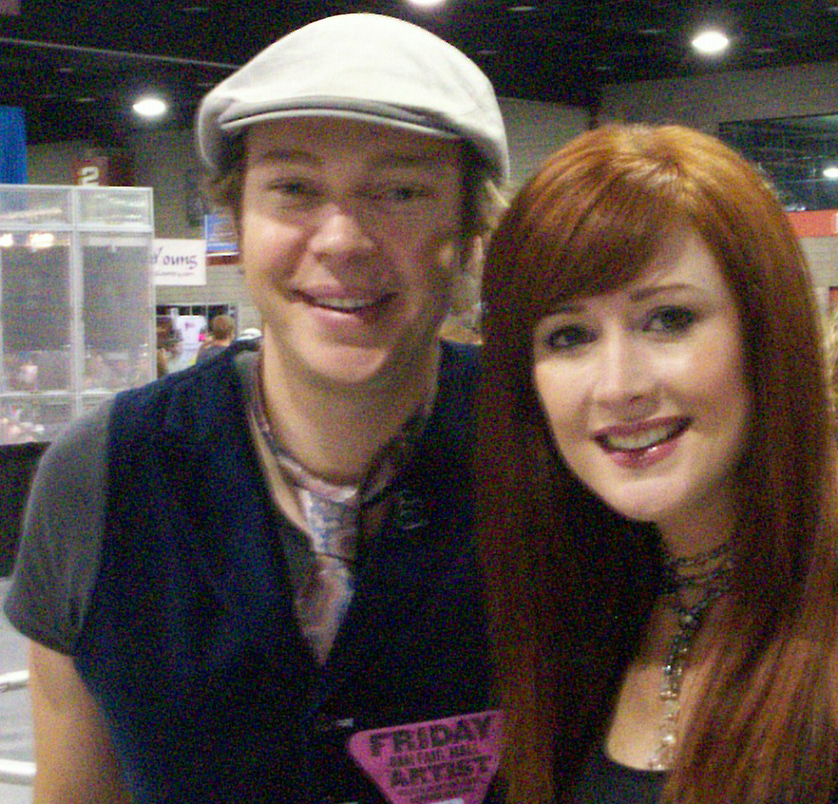
Mark O'Shea with his wife Jay O'Shea in 2010 as O'Shea

In 2007, Mark and wife Jay moved to Nashville, Tennessee and began performing as a duo. In 2010, the pair began hosting their own TV show called O'Shea USA which aired on Australia’s Country Music Channel (CMC).

The duo have released four studio albums between 2011 and 2017; all of which have peaked inside the ARIA top 50.

== Discography ==
=== Studio albums ===
List of studio albums
Title	Album details
None of the Above	Released: 1996; Format: Compact Disc, cassette; Label: ABC Country (4836152)

=== Singles ===
List of singles
Year	Title	Album
1995	"The Swimming Song"	None of the Above
1996	"The Dreamer"	None of the Above
1996	"World Weary Heart"	None of the Above

=== Zinc ===
- Making Sense Of Madness (2005)

As featured artist

List of singles with selected Australian chart positions
Title	Year	Peak chart positions
Title	Year	AUS
"Twelve Days of Christmas" (with Dreamtime Christmas All-Stars)	2004	26

=== O'Shea ===
- Mr & Mrs (2011)
- One + One (2013)
- The Famine and the Feast (2015)
- 61-615 (2017)
- Neon Soul (2022)

=== See also ===
- Zinc
- O'Shea

== Awards ==
=== Country Music Awards of Australia ===
The Country Music Awards of Australia (CMAA) (also known as the Golden Guitar Awards) is an annual awards night held in January during the Tamworth Country Music Festival, celebrating recording excellence in the Australian country music industry. They have been held annually since 1973.

Year	Nominee / work	Award	Result
1996	"The Swimming Song" by Mark O'Shea	New Talent of the Year	Won
1997	"The Dreamer" by Mark O'Shea (directed by Ross Wood)	Video Track of the Year	Won

- Note: wins only
