= List of best-selling albums of the 2000s in Australia =

ARIA's End of Decade Top 100 Albums Chart are the best selling albums in Australia from 2000 to 2009. Delta Goodrem's debut record, Innocent Eyes, became the best-selling album in Australia in the 2000s, spending a total of 29 weeks at #1 and selling more than 1.2 million copies in Australia alone since it was released in 2003. Goodrem's second album, Mistaken Identity, managed to chart at 64. Other artists, such as Coldplay and U2, each provided four albums to ARIA's End of Decade Top 100 Album Chart, with Coldplay placing at number 19 with A Rush of Blood to the Head, X&Y at 38, Viva la Vida or Death and All His Friends at 52 and Parachutes at 99. U2 proved just as relevant to the 2000s as they were to the 1980s and 1990s, with All That You Can't Leave Behind at 41, How to Dismantle an Atomic Bomb at 71, The Best of 1990-2000 at 74 and U218 Singles at 92.

Six artists contributed three titles within the top 100, each having a significant impact on music charts and genres across the last decade; they were The Black Eyed Peas, Eminem, Kylie Minogue, Michael Bublé, Red Hot Chili Peppers and Robbie Williams. Minogue was notable for being the only female artist and only Australian artist to have three albums rank in the chart with Fever at 13, Light Years at 69 and Ultimate Kylie at 82.

== Top 100 ==
Position	Album title	Artist	Year	Peak
1	Innocent Eyes	Delta Goodrem	2003	1
2	Funhouse	Pink	2008	1
3	I'm Not Dead	Pink	2006	1
4	Come Away with Me	Norah Jones	2003	1
5	The Sound of White	Missy Higgins	2005	1
6	Only by the Night	Kings of Leon	2008	1
7	Get Born	Jet	2004	1
8	Back to Bedlam	James Blunt	2006	1
9	Greatest Hits	Robbie Williams	2004	1
10	The Eminem Show	Eminem	2002	1
11	Odyssey Number Five	Powderfinger	2000	1
12	Michael Bublé	Michael Bublé	2004	1
13	Fever	Kylie Minogue	2001	1
14	Let Go	Avril Lavigne	2002	1
15	Fallen	Evanescence	2004	1
16	Life for Rent	Dido	2003	1
17	Feeler	Pete Murray	2004	1
18	I Dreamed a Dream	Susan Boyle	2009	1
19	A Rush of Blood to the Head	Coldplay	2003	1
20	1	The Beatles	2000	1
21	Breakaway	Kelly Clarkson	2005	1
22	American Idiot	Green Day	2005	1
23	Songs About Jane	Maroon 5	2004	1
24	No Angel	Dido	2001	1
25	Vulture Street	Powderfinger	2003	1
26	Barricades & Brickwalls	Kasey Chambers	2002	1
27	Monkey Business	The Black Eyed Peas	2005	1
28	Just as I Am	Guy Sebastian	2003	1
29	FutureSex/LoveSounds	Justin Timberlake	2007	1
30	It's Time	Michael Bublé	2005	1
31	Reach Out: The Motown Record	Human Nature	2006	1
32	Greatest Hits	Red Hot Chili Peppers	2003	2
33	Elephunk	The Black Eyed Peas	2004	1
34	Call Me Irresponsible	Michael Bublé	2007	1
35	The Very Best of Fleetwood Mac	Fleetwood Mac	2003	1
36	Black Ice	AC/DC	2008	1
37	That's What I'm Talking About	Shannon Noll	2004	1
38	X&Y	Coldplay	2005	1
39	Wolfmother	Wolfmother	2005	3
40	Moulin Rouge! Music from Baz Luhrmann's Film	Various Artists	2001	2
41	All That You Can't Leave Behind	U2	2000	1
42	Eyes Open	Snow Patrol	2006	1
43	Laundry Service	Shakira	2002	1
44	Play	Moby	2000	1
45	Escapology	Robbie Williams	2002	3
46	Affirmation	Savage Garden	2000	1
47	All the Right Reasons	Nickelback	2006	2
48	More Than You Think You Are	Matchbox Twenty	2003	3
49	Love, Angel, Music, Baby	Gwen Stefani	2005	1
50	Tea & Sympathy	Bernard Fanning	2005	1
51	Sunrise over Sea	The John Butler Trio	2004	1
52	Viva la Vida or Death and All His Friends	Coldplay	2008	1
53	By the Way	Red Hot Chili Peppers	2002	1
54	Escape	Enrique Iglesias	2002	1
55	One Voice: The Greatest Hits	John Farnham	2003	1
56	A Funk Odyssey	Jamiroquai	2002	1
57	On and On	Jack Johnson	2003	3
58	Swing When You're Winning	Robbie Williams	2002	3
59	Number Ones	Michael Jackson	2003	1
60	rearviewmirror	Pearl Jam	2004	2
61	The Winner's Journey	Damien Leith	2006	1
62	Here Come the Drums	Rogue Traders	2006	2
63	See the Sun	Pete Murray	2005	1
64	Mistaken Identity	Delta Goodrem	2005	1
65	The Secret Life of...	The Veronicas	2006	2
66	Stripped	Christina Aguilera	2003	7
67	Black Fingernails, Red Wine	Eskimo Joe	2006	1
68	Born to Do It	Craig David	2001	2
69	Light Years	Kylie Minogue	2000	1
70	ELV1S	Elvis Presley	2002	1
71	How to Dismantle an Atomic Bomb	U2	2008	1
72	Ancora	Il Divo	2005	1
73	Their Greatest Hits: The Record	Bee Gees	2001	1
74	The Best of 1990–2000	U2	2002	1
75	Greatest Hits	Guns N' Roses	2004	6
76	The Essential Michael Jackson	Michael Jackson	2009	3
77	8 Mile	Shady Records	2002	1
78	Encore	Eminem	2004	1
79	The Marshall Mathers LP	Eminem	2001	1
80	In Time: The Best of R.E.M. 1988–2003	R.E.M.	2003	5
81	The Power	Vanessa Amorosi	2000	1
82	Ultimate Kylie	Kylie Minogue	2004	5
83	Californication	Red Hot Chili Peppers	2000	1
84	The E.N.D	The Black Eyed Peas	2009	1
85	In Blue	The Corrs	2000	1
86	"In Your Honour"	Foo Fighters	2005	1
87	Fearless	Taylor Swift	2009	2
88	Human Clay	Creed	2001	2
89	The Fame Monster	Lady Gaga	2009	3
90	Demon Days	Gorillaz	2005	1
91	Confessions	Usher	2004	2
92	U218 Singles	U2	2006	1
93	Chocolate Starfish and the Hot Dog Flavored Water	Limp Bizkit	2001	1
94	The Dutchess	Fergie	2007	1
95	Hybrid Theory	Linkin Park	2001	2
96	Mad Season	Matchbox Twenty	2000	1
97	Hot Fuss	The Killers	2004	1
98	Meteora	Linkin Park	2003	1
99	Parachutes	Coldplay	2001	2
100	It's Not Me, It's You	Lily Allen	2009	1

== See also ==
- List of best-selling singles of the 2000s in Australia
