= A Million Suns =

Studio album by Shannon Noll
- Released: 14 October 2011 (Australia)
- Recorded: 2011
- Genre: Pop rock
- Length: 43:53
- Label: Universal Music Australia

Shannon Noll chronology
| What Matters the Most (2009) | A Million Suns (2011) | Unbroken (2018) |

Singles from A Million Suns
- 1. "Switch Me On" Released: August 2011; 2. "My Place in the Line" Released: October 2011; 3. "Living in Stereo" Released: April 2012; 4. "Rewind" Released: 2012

The fourth studio album from Australian singer-songwriter Shannon Noll is called A Million Suns. It was the 1st release through Universal Music Australia on 14 October 2011 in Australia.

Noll embarked on his A Million Suns Tour in 2012 to promote the album.

== Reception ==
Professional ratings
Review scores
| Source | Rating |
|---|---|
| AllMusic | 3/5 stars |

Jon O'Brien from AllMusic gave the album 3 out of 5 saying "A Million Suns should ensure that Noll remains one of Australian Idol's most enduring contestants, but it's merely a competent return rather than an "all guns blazing" comeback." adding ""My Place in the Line" and "Living in Stereo" are arena-sized anthems that might briefly satisfy those waiting impatiently for the next Bryan Adams record, the impassioned melodies of the lead single, "Switch Me On," echo the radio-friendly AOR of Goo Goo Dolls... while "Til We Say So" and the title track are blistering slices of blue-collar rock that showcase Noll's vocals at their most gravelly."

== Track listing ==
1. "Switch Me On" (Shannon Noll, Lindsay Rimes, Benji Madden) – 3:26
2. "A Million Suns" (Josh Bitmead, Bry Jones, Shannon Noll) – 3:12
3. "My Place in the Line" (Adam Reily, Shannon Noll) – 3:55
4. "Come Home" (Adam Reily) – 3:40
5. "Rewind" (Adam Reily, Bry Jones, Shannon Noll) – 4:00
6. "Til We Say So" (Adam Reily, Bry Jones, Shannon Noll) – 3:46
7. "Long Way Home" (Lindsay Rimes, Brett Creswell, Shannon Noll) – 3:47
8. "Living in Stereo" (Lindsay Rimes, Brett Creswell, Shannon Noll) – 3:32
9. "Path of Gold" (David Musumeci, Anthony Egizii, Bry Jones) – 3:34
10. "Collide" (Lindsay Rimes, Simon Shapiro, Shannon Noll, Bry Jones) – 3:47
11. "Would It Be So Bad" (Lindsay Rimes, Shannon Noll, Brooke McClymont, Bry Jones) – 3:55
12. "It's a Man's Man's World" (James Brown, Betty Jean Newsome) – 3:13

== Charts ==
=== Weekly charts ===
| Chart (2011) | Peak position |
|---|---|
| Australian Albums (ARIA) | 8 |

=== Year-end charts ===
| Chart (2011) | Position |
|---|---|
| Australian Artist Albums Chart | 50 |

== Release history ==
| Region | Date | Format(s) | Label | Catalog | Ref. |
|---|---|---|---|---|---|
| Australia | 14 October 2011 | CD; digital download | Universal Music Australia | 2784207 | |
