= O'Shea (duo) =

Australian country music duo

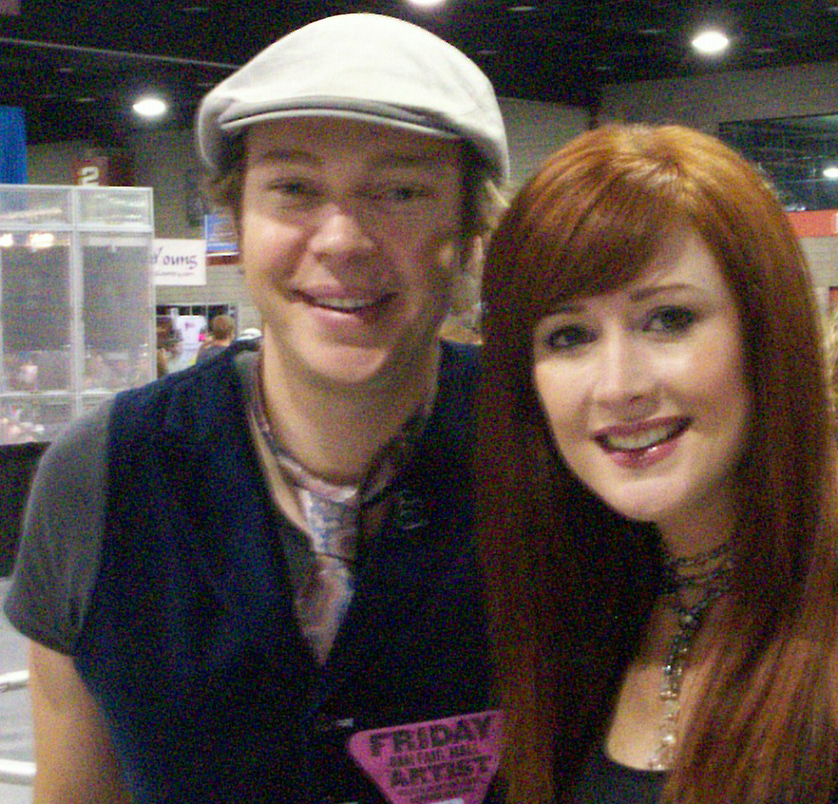
- O'Shea at CMA Music Festival, 2010

Background information
- Genre: Country
- Years active: 2007–Present
- Label: Trauma
- Members: Jay O'Shea; Mark O'Shea
- Website: therealoshea.com

O'Shea is an Australian country music duo composed of Mark (born 16 February 1977) and Jay (previously Kylie Smith) (born 17 January 1974). The duo commenced in 2007 and after relocating to Nashville in 2007, the duo has seen success as artists and songwriters, with nine #1 singles on the Australian country charts, as well as finishing fifth in the Country Music Television 2009 series Can You Duet. The duo have released four studio albums, all of which have peaked inside the ARIA top 50.

O'Shea hosts O'Shea USA, a television show on Foxtel's Country Music Channel.

== Solo careers ==
=== 1977-2007: Mark's solo career and Zinc ===
Originally from Dalby, Queensland, Mark's musical career commenced at the age of seventeen when he won the Gympie Music Muster talent competition in 1993, which subsequently led to a record deal.

Mark's debut album was honored with two Golden Guitar Awards from the CMAA for Best New Talent of the Year (1996) for the track "The Swimming Song" and Best Video (1997) for "The Dreamer".

In 2002, Mark formed the rock/pop group Zinc with brother John O'Shea and Adam Ray. The band released one studio album in 2005 and disbanded in 2007. In 2006, Mark toured as a guitarist for Ronn Moss.

=== 1974-2007: Jay's solo career ===
Jay was involved in performing arts from a young age, touring the UK and Europe with the Australian Dance-Drill team at age 15.

In 2003 Jay signed her first publishing deal with Warner Chappell London. While working in London, Jay co-wrote "Rutinas" with Wendy Page and Jim Marr. The song became the hit single on Chenoa's album Nada Es Igual and reached No. 1 on the Spanish chart in 2005.

== O'Shea ==
=== 2007–2010: The Formative Years ===
In 2007, Mark and Jay moved to Nashville, Tennessee and began performing as a duo and provided support act for artists including Phil Vassar, Jimmy Wayne, Sara Evans, and the Oak Ridge Boys.

In 2010, the pair began hosting their own TV show called O'Shea USA which aired on Australia's Country Music Channel (CMC).

=== 2011–2013: Mr. and Mrs. ===
In 2011, the duo signed with Sony Music Australia and released their debut studio album Mr. and Mrs. The album featured 11 tracks written/co-written by the duo alongside Nashville co-writers Dave Berg, Josh Leo, and Georgia Middleman and debuted at No. 9 on the ARIA Charts.

In 2011, O'Shea performed at CMC Rocks the Hunter and hosted the DVD coverage of the event.

In 2012, O'Shea being won th 2012 CMAA New Talent of the Year Award.

=== 2013–2017: One + One & The Famine and the Feast ===
In 2013, Their second studio album One + One debuted at number 3 on the ARIA Country Charts and peaked inside the top 30 on the all genre chart.

In 2015, the duo's album The Famine and the Feast reached number 36 on the ARIA Charts, and number 1 on the ARIA Country Albums chart.

=== 2017–Present: 61-615 ===
In 2017, O'Shea released the studio album 61-615, which reached number 16 on the ARIA charts. The album's first single, "Start Over", written by Mark, Jay, and singer-songwriter Alex Lloyd, peaked at #1 on The Music Network's national Country Airplay chart.

== Personal lives ==
Mark and Jay became a couple in 1996 and married in 2004. They have two daughters.

In 2014, Jay collaborated with her birth father, Midnight Oil drummer Rob Hirst, on "The Truth Walks Slowly". Jay met Hirst in 2010 following a long search for her birth parents, who gave her up for adoption when they were teenagers. Hirst died in 2026.

Mark is a keen angler.

== Charitable work ==
Mark and Jay O'Shea have contributed their talents to the charitable organizations such as World Vision and HeartKids.

== Discography ==
=== Albums ===
List of studio, with Australian chart positions
Title	Album details	Peak chart positions
Title	Album details	AUS
Mr. & Mrs.	Released: 30 September 2011; Label: Sony Music Australia (886979732926); Formats: CD, digital download	39
One + One	Released: 18 January 2013; Label: Sony Music Australia (887654215222); Formats: CD, digital download	24
The Famine and the Feast	Released: 16 January 2015; Label: Sony Music Australia (88875011772); Formats: CD, digital download	36
61-615	Released: 28 July 2017; Label: Sony Music Australia (88985443792); Formats: CD, digital download	16
Neon Soul	Released: 27 May 2022; Label: Sony Music Australia; Formats: CD, digital download	26

== Awards and nominations ==
=== APRA Awards ===
The APRA Awards are presented annually from 1982 by the Australasian Performing Right Association (APRA), "honouring composers and songwriters". They commenced in 1982.

Year	Nominee / work	Award	Result	Ref.
2012	"Meant to Be" (Kim Carnes, Mark O’Shea, Jay Smith)	Country Work of the Year	Nominated	
2014	"Be with You Tonight" (Tim Nichols, Jay O’Shea, Mark O’Shea)	Country Work of the Year	Nominated	
2014	"Thank You Angels" (Jay O’Shea, Mark O’Shea, Matthew Scullion)	Country Work of the Year	Nominated	

=== ARIA Music Awards ===
The ARIA Music Awards are a set of annual ceremonies presented by Australian Recording Industry Association (ARIA), which recognise excellence, innovation, and achievement across all genres of the music of Australia. They commenced in 1987.

Year	Nominee / work	Award	Result
2017	61-615	Best Country Album	Nominated

=== Country Music Awards of Australia ===
The Country Music Awards of Australia (CMAA) (also known as the Golden Guitar Awards) is an annual awards night held in January during the Tamworth Country Music Festival, celebrating recording excellence in the Australian country music industry. They have been held annually since 1973.

Year	Nominee / work	Award	Result
2012	O'Shea	New Talent of the Year	Won
2014	"Thank You Angels"	Group or Duo of the Year	Won
2017	"The Truth Walks Slowly (In the Country Side)" (featuring Rob Hirst)	CMC Video Clip of the Year	Won

- Note: wins only
