= Everybody Needs a Little Help (song) =

Single by Shannon Noll

from the album Turn It Up
- Released: 4 February 2008
- Recorded: 2007
- Genre: Rock
- Length: 3:34
- Label: Sony BMG
- Songwriter(s): Shannon Noll; Steve McEwan

Shannon Noll singles chronology
"In Pieces" (2007)	"Everybody Needs a Little Help" (2008)	"Summertime" (2008)

"Everybody Needs a Little Help" was the third and final single from Shannon Noll's third album, Turn It Up. It was released as a radio-only single on 4 February 2008. The track reached number one on the Australian Airplay Chart. A physical release was scheduled to be released, but, similarly to Noll's previous radio single, New Beginning, this plan was set aside. The reasoning lay in the impending release of Noll's first compilation album, No Turning Back: The Story So Far.

== Video ==
A video was to be shot in early February 2008, but was cancelled after Sony BMG made the decision to focus on new material being released later in the year.

== Track listing ==
Promo Single:

1. "Everybody Needs a Little Help" - 3:34

== Chart Positioning ==
Chart (2008)	Peak Position
Australian Airplay Chart	1
