= Who I Am (Shannon Noll song) =

Single by Shannon Noll

from the album Unbroken
- Released: 30 September 2016
- Recorded: 2016
- Genre: Pop, rock
- Length: 3:36
- Label: Warner Music Australia
- Songwriters: Shannon Noll, Michael Tan, Brett Creswell
- Producer: Craig Porteils

Shannon Noll singles chronology
"Spirit of the Anzacs" (2015)	"Who I Am" (2016)	"Southern Sky" (2017)

"Who I Am" is a single by Australian recording artist Shannon Noll. The song was released on September 30, 2016, digitally and physically as the lead single from Noll's fifth studio album, Unbroken (2018). The song peaked at number 56 on the Australian ARIA Charts.

Noll described the song as “me saying this is me like it or not, I think in this business people try to make you something you’re not. It’s a joyful song that is all about being yourself and doing the things that make you happy.”

Noll performed the track at the 2016 Deni Ute Muster on 1 October 2016 where the official video clip was filmed. Noll promoted the song on his national tour across Australia throughout October 2016.

The lyric video received over 55,000 views in its first two hours.

== Reception ==
Zanda Wilson from Music Feeds said "[it's] the most pop-infused track we’ve heard from Nollsie in a long time."

Kristanna Sutton from aaa Backstage said ""Who I Am" encapsulates everything we love about [Noll] and it has definitely captured the hearts of true Nollsy fans around the country."

Mallory Arbour from The AU Review described it as "upbeat, catchy and a real stick-it-to-the-man song".

== Official versions ==
CD single (5419737872)

1. "Who I Am" (Living in the Country Mix) - 3:36
2. "Who I Am" (Living in the City Mix) - 3:33

== Charts ==
Chart (2016)	Peak Position
Australian (ARIA Charts)	56
