= So Fresh: The Hits of Spring 2007 =

Compilation album by Various Artists
- Released: 8 September 2007
- Length: Pop
- Label: Universal Music Australia; Sony Music Australia

So Fresh chronology
| So Fresh: The Hits of Winter 2007 (2007) | So Fresh: The Hits of Spring 2007 (2007) | So Fresh: The Hits of Summer 2008 (2007) |

So Fresh: The Hits of Spring 2007 features 20 songs that were popular during spring 2007 in Australia, and it was released on 8 September 2007. The songs featured on the compilation have all charted on the ARIA Singles Chart.

It was the third highest selling compilation album in Australia in 2007.

== Track listing ==
The Hits of Spring 2007
| No. | Title | Artist(s) | Length |
|---|---|---|---|
| 1. | "Big Girls Don't Cry" (Personal) | Fergie | 4:30 |
| 2. | "Dance Floor Anthem (I Don't Want to Be in Love)" | Good Charlotte | 3:48 |
| 3. | "4 in the Morning" | Gwen Stefani | 4:51 |
| 4. | "Umbrella" | Rihanna | 4:14 |
| 5. | "Lost and Running" | Powderfinger | 3:41 |
| 6. | "LoveStoned/I Think She Knows" | Justin Timberlake | 5:25 |
| 7. | "Dear Mr. President" | Pink | 4:33 |
| 8. | "When You're Gone" | Avril Lavigne | 4:00 |
| 9. | "Love Today" | Mika | 3:55 |
| 10. | "Slow Down Baby" | Christina Aguilera | 3:27 |
| 11. | "Never Again" | Kelly Clarkson | 3:36 |
| 12. | "Makes Me Wonder" | Maroon 5 | 3:32 |
| 13. | "Thnks fr th Mmrs" | Fall Out Boy | 3:24 |
| 14. | "Don't Matter" | Akon | 4:09 |
| 15. | "Better Than Me" | Hinder | 3:42 |
| 16. | "22 Steps" | Damien Leith | 3:34 |
| 17. | "Cover on My Heart" | Guy Sebastian | 4:13 |
| 18. | "Don't Miss You" | Amy Pearson | 3:23 |
| 19. | "Words" | Kate Miller-Heidke | 3:19 |
| 20. | "Black Tattoo" | Grinspoon | 2:51 |

== Charts ==
| Chart (2007) | Peak position |
| ARIA Top 20 Compilations | 1 |

== Certifications ==
| Region | Certification | Certified units/sales |
|---|---|---|
| Australia (ARIA) | 2× Platinum | 140,000^{^} |
^{^} Shipments figures based on certification alone.
