= Tod Williams =

Tod Williams may refer to:

- Tod Williams (architect) (born 1943), architect
- Tod Williams (filmmaker) (born 1968), film director (and son of the architect)

== See also ==
- Todd Williams (disambiguation)
