= Dreamtime Christmas All-Stars =

Dreamtime Christmas All-stars

Background information
- Origin: Australia
- Years active: 2004
- Label: EMI

Dreamtime Christmas All-Stars were an all-star collaboration of Australian celebrities. They released one single, "Twelve Days of Christmas", which reached No. 26 on the Australian ARIAnet Singles Chart.

== Members ==
- Shannon Noll
- Human Nature
- Cosima
- Jimmy Barnes
- Zinc
- Rob Mills
- Amity Dry
- Tahyna Tozzi
- Kyle
- Katie Underwood
- Bob Downe
- Shakaya
- Bobby McLeod
- Todd Williams
- Glenn Skuthorpe
- Matty Johns

== Track listing ==
- "Twelve Days of Christmas" (2004) - EMI Music Australia
1. "Twelve Days of Christmas"
2. "Happy Christmas (War Is Over)"
3. "Santa Claus Is Comin' to Town"
4. "Twelve Days of Christmas" (Pee Wee Ferris Remix)

== Charts ==
| Chart (2004/25) | Peak position |
|---|---|
| Australia (ARIA) | 26 |
