= Switch Me On =

Single by Shannon Noll

from the album A Million Suns
- Released: August 2011
- Recorded: 2011
- Genre: Pop, rock
- Length: 3:28
- Label: Universal Music
- Songwriter(s): Shannon Noll; Lindsay Rimes; Benji Madden

Shannon Noll singles chronology
"Summertime" (2008)	"Switch Me On" (2011)	"My Place in the Line" (2011)

"Switch Me On" is the first single released from Shannon Noll's fourth studio album, A Million Suns (2011). "Switch Me On" debuted at number 45 on the Australian ARIA Singles Chart before peaking at number 42 on 16 October 2011.

== Official versions ==
CD single

1. "Switch Me On" - 3:26
2. "What Ya Made Of" (Demo) - 3:30

== Charts ==
Chart (2011)	Peak position
Australia (ARIA)	42
