= That's What I'm Talking About =

Studio album by Shannon Noll
- Released: 9 February 2004
- Recorded: December 2003 – January 2004
- Studio: Studios 301 (Sydney), Eargasm (Sydney)
- Genre: Rock, pop rock
- Label: Sony BMG
- Producer: Bryon Jones

Shannon Noll chronology
That's What I'm Talking About (2004)	Lift (2005)

Singles from That's What I'm Talking About
- 1. "What About Me" Released: 26 January 2004; 2. "Drive" Released: 19 April 2004; 3. "Learn to Fly" Released: 5 July 2004; 4. "New Beginning (radio only) " Released: 4 October 2004

That's What I'm Talking About is the debut studio album by Australian singer Shannon Noll, released on 9 February 2004 (see 2004 in music) and debuted at number 1 on the ARIA Charts. The album includes his number one, 4× platinum debut single, "What About Me".

A 20th Anniversary Collectors Edition will be released in April 2024, featuring live performances and some of Noll's greatest hits.

== Track listing ==
Standard Edition

1. "Drive" (Phil Thornalley/Bryan Adams) – 3:58
2. "New Beginning" (Thomas Who/Negin) – 4:00
3. "What About Me" (Garry Frost/Frances Frost) – 3:21
4. "Burn" (Jeff Franzel/Ty Lacy/Jess Cates) – 3:37
5. "Sittin' Pretty" (Mark Jaimes/Danny Saxon/Andy Wright/Ronan Cavanagh) – 3:40
6. "Learn to Fly" (Peter Gordann/Rick Mitra/Christian Ingebrigtsen/Christopher Porter) – 4:12
7. "Promises" (Nikolaj Steen) – 3:44
8. "Tune In" (Ole Jorgen Olsen) – 3:43
9. "Prove" (Adam Riley) – 3:57
10. "Wise" (James Kempster/Simon Hosford/Gene Cook) – 3:39
11. "The Way She Loved Me" (Glenn Cunningham) – 3:21
12. "The Way That I Feel" (Shannon Noll/Damian Noll) – 3:30

Limited edition copies of the album were housed in a slipcase and also contained a bonus disc containing the following tracks:

1. "Angels Brought Me Here" (Jorgan Elofsson/John Reid)
2. "With or Without You" (Recorded live on Australian Idol: Up Close and Personal) (A. Clayton/L. Mullen/D. Evans/P. Hewson)

20th Anniversary Collectors Edition (CD2)

1. "No Time"
2. "Don't You Wanna Stay" (with Cosima De Vito)
3. "Lift"
4. "Shine"
5. "Now I Run"
6. "Lonely"
7. "Wont Let You Go"
8. "Don't Give Up" (with Natalie Bassingthwaite)
9. "In Pieces"
10. "Loud"
11. "Drive" (Live 2004)
12. "Learn to Fly" (Live 2004)
13. "Wise" (Live 2004)
14. "Better Be Home Soon" (Live 2004)
15. "With or Without You" (Live 2004)
16. "Working Class Man" (Live 2004)
17. "What About Me" (Live 2004)
18. "Angels Brought Me Here"

== Charts ==
The album debuted at number-one on the Australian Albums Chart with sales of 131,680 copies. The album remained at the top spot for four weeks. The album spent a total of thirteen weeks in the top ten.

=== Weekly charts ===
Chart (2004)	Peak position
Australian Albums (ARIA)	1
New Zealand Albums (RMNZ)	31

=== Year-end charts ===
Chart (2004)	Position
Australian Albums (ARIA)	2

=== Decade-end charts ===
Chart (2000–2009)	Position
Australian Albums (ARIA)	37

== Certifications ==
Region	Certification	Certified units/sales
Australia (ARIA)	5× Platinum	350,000^{^}
^{^} Shipments figures based on certification alone.

== Release history ==
Region	Date	Format(s)	Label	Catalog	Version	Ref.
Australia / New Zealand	9 February 2004	CD; digital download	Sony BMG	82876587802 / 82876594852	Standard and Bonus CD single	
Australia	5 April 2024	2×CD; digital download	Sony Music Australia	19658879472	20th Anniversary Collectors Edition	

== See also ==
- List of number-one albums of 2004 (Australia)
- List of best-selling albums of the 2000s in Australia
