= Unbroken (Shannon Noll album) =

Studio album by Shannon Noll
- Released: 2 February 2018
- Studio: Eargasm
- Genre: Pop rock
- Length: 46:52
- Label: Warner Music Australia
- Producer: Craig Porteils

Shannon Noll chronology
A Million Suns (2011)	Unbroken (2018)	Raw (2021)

Singles from Unbroken
- 1. "Who I Am" Released: 30 September 2016; 2. "Southern Sky" Released: 5 May 2017; 3. "Land of Mine" Released: 19 January 2018

Unbroken is the fifth studio album by Australian singer-songwriter Shannon Noll, released on 2 February 2018 through Warner Music Australia. The album is his first with Warner Music Australia. The album was announced in December 2017 with Noll saying, "It's been a good while since I've released an album even though I've been writing the whole time and I'm so proud to say that these songs are the best of all the songs I have written. I've had more input than ever, so this album is more personal to me than any other before it. I can't wait to see what my fans think of it, because I couldn't be happier."

Noll told news.com.au, "I grew up listening to "Great Southern Land" and "Sounds of Then (This Is Australia)" and they hold a really special place in my heart because they celebrate who we are and our love of Australia." He added, "I wouldn't change a thing about who I am ... you know I have never been the cool guy and I think it's time for people to appreciate how lucky we are in this country."

A national tour in support of the album took place in May 2018.

== Reception ==
Professional ratings
Review scores
Source	Rating
auspOp	3/5

Haydon Benfield from Renowned for Sound wrote: "By and large, Unbroken is an unexceptional album that fails to truly distinguish itself from any other album that seeks to blend country, rock, and pop." David from auspOp said "Overall this album is really enjoyable and it's great to see what Shannon calls some of his most personal tracks yet come to life. It's not a perfect album, but it feels as though that's what a Shannon Noll album should be like."

Jeff Jenkins from Stack likened Noll to Bryan Adams by "delivering uncomplicated anthems" saying "He's political in his own way. "It's time to take a stand," he declares in "No B&S", a rallying cry to return to simpler, less politically correct times. "A good time's not what it used to be – got noise restrictions and fun police." Jingoistic, sure, but Noll knows how to write a nifty tune."

== Track listing ==
1. "Southern Sky" (Shannon Noll, Michael Tan, Brett Creswell) – 4:06
2. "Who I Am" (Living in the City mix) (Noll, Tan, Creswell) – 3:36
3. "No B&S" (Noll, Tan, Creswell) – 4:31
4. "Land of Mine" (Noll, Tan, Creswell) – 4:13
5. "Invincible" (Noll, Jon Hume) – 3:32
6. "Take It Back" (Noll, Lindsay Rimes, Mark McEntee) – 3:28
7. "You're All That I Need" (Noll, Tom Busby, Ron Conley) – 3:23
8. "Breath of Life" (Noll, Rimes, Creswell) – 3:35
9. "Cross a Bridge" (Noll, Busby, Conley)– 3:24
10. "Fortunate Son" (John Fogerty) – 3:10
11. "Never Too Late" (Noll, Rimes, Creswell) – 3:40
12. "My Body Loves to Party" (Noll, Busby, Conley)– 2:44
13. "Mountains to Climb" (Noll, Ash Maklad, Johanna Elms) – 3:30

== Charts ==
Chart performance for Unbroken
Chart (2018)	Peak position
Australian Albums (ARIA)	7

== Release history ==
Release history and formats for Unbroken
Region	Date	Format(s)	Label	Catalog	Ref.
Australia	2 February 2018	CD; digital download	Warner Music Australia	5419786722	
