= Turn It Up (Shannon Noll album) =

Studio album by Shannon Noll
- Released: 15 September 2007
- Recorded: 2007
- Genre: Pop rock
- Label: Sony BMG

Shannon Noll chronology
Lift (2005)	Turn It Up (2007)	No Turning Back: The Story So Far (2008)

Singles from Turn It Up
- 1. "Loud" Released: 1 September 2007; 2. "In Pieces" Released: 23 October 2007; 3. "Everybody Needs a Little Help" Released: 5 May 2008 (radio single only)

Turn It Up is the third studio album from Australian singer-songwriter Shannon Noll. It was released on 15 September 2007 and peaked at number 3 in Australia.

== Track listing ==
1. "Loud" (Andy Stochansky, James Michael) – 3:11
2. "Everybody Needs a Little Help" (Shannon Noll, Steve McEwan) – 3:34
3. "In Pieces" (Bobby Huff, Eric Silver) – 3:33
4. "Crashing Down" – 3:20
5. "Is You" – 3:44
6. "Walls" – 3:37
7. "Breakdown" – 3:46
8. "Way Out" – 3:14
9. "Sorry Is Just Too Late" (co-written with Richie Sambora) – 3:55
10. "Afterburn" – 4:26
11. "Won't Let You Go" – 3:48
12. "Only Thing Missing" – 4:31
13. "Tomorrow" (iTunes exclusive) – 4:01

== Limited edition DVD ==
1. "Turn It Up – Making of the Album"
2. "Loud" (music video)
3. Los Angeles photo shoot
4. "On the Set of the 'Loud' Video"

== Charts and certifications ==
=== Weekly charts ===
Chart (2007/08)	Peak position
Australian Albums (ARIA)	3

=== Year-end charts ===
Chart (2007)	Position
Australian Albums Chart	58
Australian Artist Albums Chart	26

=== Certifications ===
Region	Certification	Certified units/sales
Australia (ARIA)	Platinum	70,000^{^}
^{^} Shipments figures based on certification alone.

== Release history ==
Region	Date	Format(s)	Label	Catalog	Ref.
Australia	15 September 2007	CD; digital download	Sony BMG	88697151852	
