= Jayne Denham =

Australian country singer-songwriter

- Born: Blue Mountains, New South Wales, Australia
- Origin: Australia
- Genres: Country rock; Country
- Occupations: Singer; Songwriter
- Instruments: Vocals
- Years active: 2007–present
- Labels: Leap Records; ABC Music; Checked Label Services
- Website: jaynedenham.com

Jayne Denham is an Australian country rock singer-songwriter. Active since 2006, she has released six studio albums and charted five number-one singles on Australian country radio. She has received seven Golden Guitar nominations across her career. Denham has performed at major Australian country music festivals, including the Tamworth Country Music Festival, Gympie Music Muster, and Deni Ute Muster. Denham has performed at the Great American Trucking Show, Red Eye Radio and was a judge for the Overdrive/Red Eye Radio Trucker Talent Search in 2016.

== Career ==
Jayne Denham grew up in a musical family; her mother was a gospel singer trained in opera, and her father and grandfather were involved in musical theatre. Denham began singing on stage in church at age five, and by her early twenties she was touring the USA and Europe with Youth Alive, performing in stadiums for thousands. She began her performing career as a rock frontwoman before her narrative songwriting drew her to country music, ultimately leading her to develop her distinct country-rock style.

Denham released her debut album Sudden Change in Weather in 2007. The lead single "Chick Ute" charted across Europe in 2006, reaching number two in Norway, number four in Italy, number five in the Netherlands and Denmark, and number twelve on the European Country Music Association chart. In 2008, she won the Australian Independent Country Music Award for Best Rising Star.

Her second album Shake This Town followed in 2009, and her third album Renegade in 2013. An extended play, Renegade II, was released in September 2015. From the Renegade album period, the single "Beyond These City Lights", a duet with Shannon Noll, reached number one on Australian country radio and received a Golden Guitar nomination for Vocal Collaboration of the Year at the 2014 awards.

Her fourth studio album Calamity was released in March 2018. The album's lead single, "Hung Up on You", a duet with Australian country artist Troy Kemp, reached number one on Australian country radio and number one on the Country Music Channel chart, and received a Golden Guitar nomination for Vocal Collaboration of the Year at the 2019 awards.

In 2020, Denham released "Porch Party", a collaborative single featuring Australian country artists Jasmine Rae and Amber Lawrence.

Her fifth studio album Wanted was released in August 2021. It debuted at number one on the ARIA Top 20 Australian Country Albums chart and number two on the Australian Independent Record Labels Association chart across all genres. The album received two Golden Guitar nominations, for Female Artist of the Year and Contemporary Album of the Year.

Her sixth studio album Moonshine was released on 3 May 2024. It debuted at number one on the ARIA Top 20 Australian Country Albums chart, number seven on the ARIA Top 20 Australian Albums chart, and number fourteen on the ARIA Top 40 Country Albums chart. The title track, featuring Colt Ford, received placements on CMT in the United States and on the CMT Official Top 30 in Australia. The album includes "Are You Ready For This", a collaborative track featuring Newcastle-based five-piece band Hurricane Fall. The album also features "Night Burn", a single released in 2024 featuring Nashville-based singer-songwriter Jason Sever, who had previously co-written "Lovin' a Wild Thing" for the album. A deluxe edition, Moonshine Deluxe, was released on 27 September 2024, and received two Golden Guitar nominations at the 2025 awards for Toyota Album of the Year and Contemporary Country Album of the Year.

In October 2025, Denham revealed to Grace Stokes of Scenestr that she was recording a new album in Nashville with producer Marti Frederiksen, known for his work with Aerosmith, Faith Hill, Carrie Underwood, Mick Jagger, and Ozzy Osbourne. Denham has also collaborated in the sessions with Australian songwriter Kylie Sackley, with Frederiksen describing the creative combination as a "magical team." Singles released throughout 2026 include "Hillbilly Halo", "Preacher's Son", "Angel of Mercy", "Gotta Believe It", and God Knows (co-written with Andrew Farriss (INXS) and Marti Frederiksen) ahead of the scheduled February 5, 2027 release of her seventh album, Churches.

Denham is an ambassador for the Women In Trucking Association, Inc in the United States, a role that grew from her long association with trucking culture through her songwriting. She has performed at US trucking industry events including the Great American Truck Show in Dallas, the Mid-America Trucking Show in Louisville, and the Ohio Truck Show.

== Discography ==
=== Studio albums ===
Title	Album details	Peak chart positions	
AUS	AUS Country		
Sudden Change in Weather	Released: 2007; Label: Leap Records; Format: CD	—	—
Shake This Town	Released: 2009; Label: Jayne Denham; Format: CD	—	—
Renegade	Released: April 2013; Label: ABC Music; Format: CD, digital	—	—
Calamity	Released: 16 March 2018; Label: Checked Label Services; Format: CD, digital	—	—
Wanted	Released: 13 August 2021; Label: Checked Label Services; Format: CD, digital	97	1
Moonshine	Released: 3 May 2024; Label: Jayne Denham; Format: CD, digital	7	1

"—" denotes a release that did not chart or for which chart position is not confirmed.

=== Extended plays ===
Title	EP details
Renegade II	Released: September 2015; Label: ABC Music; Format: CD, digital

== Awards and nominations ==
Year	Award	Category	Result
2008	Australian Independent Country Music Awards	Best Rising Star	Won
2010	Country Music Awards of Australia (Golden Guitar)	Best New Talent (New Talent of the Year)	Nominated
2014	Country Music Awards of Australia (Golden Guitar)	Vocal Collaboration of the Year ("Beyond These City Lights" with Shannon Noll)	Nominated
2019	Country Music Awards of Australia (Golden Guitar)	Vocal Collaboration of the Year ("Hung Up on You" with Troy Kemp)	Nominated
2022	Country Music Awards of Australia (Golden Guitar)	Female Artist of the Year	Nominated
2022	Country Music Awards of Australia (Golden Guitar)	Contemporary Album of the Year (Wanted)	Nominated
2025	Country Music Awards of Australia (Golden Guitar)	Toyota Album of the Year (Moonshine)	Nominated
2025	Country Music Awards of Australia (Golden Guitar)	Contemporary Country Album of the Year (Moonshine)	Nominated
