= Summertime (Brian Melo song) =

Brian Melo song

Single by Brian Melo

from the album Livin' It
- Released: April 11, 2008
- Genre: Pop, rock
- Length: 3:44
- Label: Sony BMG
- Songwriter(s): Greg Johnston, Andy Stochansky

Brian Melo singles chronology
"Shine" (2008)	"Summertime" (2008)	"Back to Me" (2008)

"Summertime"

Single by Shannon Noll

from the album No Turning Back: The Story So Far
- Released: August 23, 2008
- Recorded: 2008
- Genre: Rock
- Length: 3:42
- Label: Sony BMG
- Songwriter(s): Greg Johnston, Andy Stochansky

Shannon Noll singles chronology
"Everybody Needs a Little Help" (2008)	"Summertime" (2008)	"Switch Me On" (2011)

"Summertime" is a song written by Greg Johnston and Andy Stochansky, and recorded by Brian Melo for his first album Livin' It (2007). It was released as the album's third single in Canada in 2008.

== Background ==
This is Brian's third single from his debut album. However, the song failed to chart on the Canadian Hot 100. The fourth single from the album, "Back to Me," also failed to chart.

== Shannon Noll version ==
Australian singer Shannon Noll covered the song in 2008 and released it as the first single from his first compilation album No Turning Back: The Story So Far (2008). It was released as a digital download on August 23, 2008, and as a CD single on September 13, 2008, in Australia.

On September 14, 2008, the track debuted at number eighteen on the ARIA Australian Artist Chart based on downloads alone. The following week, the single debuted at number fifty-four on the Australian Singles Chart.

=== Music video ===
An open call for extras for the video was published on the Sony/BMG Music (Australia) website and via Noll's official mailing list. Originally scheduled to shoot on August 28 (for a September 6 premiere), filming was postponed a week, taking place on September 5, 2008. The video was scheduled to premiere on Rage's Saturday morning line-up on September 13, 2008, the day of the CD single's release, but was postponed due to being incomplete. It finally saw its premiere on September 25, 2008 via Sony BMG's official online musicbox.

The video's director, Anthony Rose, was criticised for his use of extras as fans, a common feature of his videos. The Sydney Morning Herald stated their dislike in a review on September 26, 2008: "Why Sony continues to hire Rose to direct is beyond us. His consistent use of the tacky looking fan backdrop is almost laughable while simultaneously looking forced, bordering on 'try-hard'. How many more of these unbearable videos can Noll have under his belt before someone in management or PR realises he's looking like a pretentious punce with no credibility. Noll is both capable and worthy of much more." The video for "Summertime" was Noll's last video to be directed by Rose.

=== Track listing ===
CD single

1. "Summertime" – 3:42
2. "Walls" (live at The Basement) – 3:46

=== Charts ===
Chart (2008)	Peak position
Australia (ARIA)	54

=== Release history ===
Country	Date	Label	Format
Australia	August 23, 2008	Sony BMG	Digital download
Australia	September 13, 2008	Sony BMG	CD single
