= Todd Williams (singer) =

- Genres: Country
- Instrument: Vocals
- Label: Secret Street

Todd Williams is an Australian singer and songwriter from Dubbo, New South Wales. He was the first indigenous winner of the Star Maker at Tamworth and won a Deadly in 2003 for Best Country Artist. His first album, Ten 'Till Midnight, was recorded live and released in 2004.

== Discography ==
- Ten 'till midnight (2004) – Secret Street
- "Falling Down" – ABC Country
