= Drive (Shannon Noll song) =

2004 song by Shannon Noll

Single by Shannon Noll

from the album That's What I'm Talking About
- B-side: "Let Me Fall with You"; "Working Class Man"
- Released: 19 April 2004
- Length: 3:59
- Label: BMG Australia
- Songwriters: Phil Thornalley; Bryan Adams
- Producers: Bryan Jones; Adam Reily

Shannon Noll singles chronology
"What About Me" (2004)	"Drive" (2004)	"Learn to Fly" (2004)

"Drive" is a song written by Phil Thornalley and Bryan Adams that was the second single released by Australian singer-songwriter Shannon Noll on 19 April 2004. The single, the second to be lifted from Noll's debut album, That's What I'm Talking About (2004), was Noll's second top-10 hit, debuting and peaking at No. 4 on the Australian ARIA Singles Chart. The single was certified platinum with shipments of 70,000 in Australia.

The track, originally demoed by Adams, was sent to Noll for inclusion on his debut album. Adams later asked Noll to support him on his Australian tour in 2004 and the pair became friends. It was rumoured that Noll was to collaborate with Adams on a track for his second album "Lift"; however, it is unknown if the pair worked together.

== Music video ==
The video, directed by Australian director Anthony Rose, was the third music video from Shannon Noll. The video was created as a mini-movie, with Noll playing the part of a motor-mechanic summoned to fix an ailing black car by an obnoxious and pushy man and his seemingly long-suffering girlfriend. The car used in the video is a 1973 XB Ford Falcon Coupe. The video was named best music video of 2004 in a readers poll conducted by Australia's TV Week magazine, and was placed at number 66 in a countdown of the Top 100 music videos of all time on the television show "Video Hits".

== Track listing ==
Australian maxi-CD single

1. "Drive" (Phil Thornalley, Bryan Adams)
2. "Let Me Fall with You" (Par Astrom, John Reid)
3. "Working Class Man" (Jonathan Cain)
4. "What About Me" (video)

== Personnel ==
Personnel are taken from the Australian maxi-CD single liner notes.

- Phil Thornalley – writing
- Bryan Adams – writing
- Shannon Noll – vocals
- Liam Shields – backing vocals
- Dave Leslie – guitars
- Sam Dixon – bass
- Adam Reily – production, programming
- Bryon Jones – production
- Oscar Gaona – mastering
- Sussanne Caccamo – artwork design
- David Anderson – photography

== Charts ==
=== Weekly charts ===
Chart (2004)	Peak position
Australia (ARIA)	4

=== Year-end charts ===
Chart (2004)	Position
Australia (ARIA)	34

== Certifications ==
Region	Certification	Certified units/sales
Australia (ARIA)	Platinum	70,000^{^}
^{^} Shipments figures based on certification alone.
