= Learn to Fly (A1 song) =

2002 song by A1

Song by A1

from the album Make It Good
- Released: November 2002
- Length: 3:47
- Label: Sony BMG
- Songwriters: Peter Gordeno; Rick Mitra; Christian Ingebrigtsen; Chris Porter
- Producer: Mike Hedges

"Learn to Fly" is a song originally recorded by British boyband A1, due to be released as the fourth single from the group's third studio album, Make It Good. Written by band member Christian Ingebrigtsen, along with Peter Gordeno, Chris Porter and Rick Mitra, a single release was cancelled when the group decided to split in late 2002. The track was later released by Australian singer Shannon Noll.

== Shannon Noll version ==
"Learn to Fly"

Single by Shannon Noll

from the album That's What I'm Talking About
- B-side: 1. "Gone Too Soon"; 2. "Hold Me in Your Arms"
- Released: 5 July 2004
- Length: 4:11
- Label: Sony BMG
- Songwriters: Peter Gordeno; Rick Mitra; Christian Ingebrigtsen; Chris Porter
- Producers: Phil Wiltshire; Bryan Jones

Shannon Noll singles chronology
"Drive" (2004)	"Learn to Fly" (2004)	"C'mon Aussie C'mon" (2004)

The song was covered in 2004 by Shannon Noll, a runner-up of Australian Idol. It was released as the third single from his debut album, That's What I'm Talking About. The single was promoted as a strictly limited edition release of 40,000 copies, all of which were sold during its 13-week chart run. In July 2004, it debuted at number one on the Australia ARIA singles chart and is certified gold by ARIA with sales of over 35,000. Noll often mentioned that "Learn to Fly" was his favourite track from his debut album, and dedicated the performance of the track to his late father during the Up Close with Shannon Noll television special.

The single release includes two previously unreleased B-sides, one being a cover of the Southern Sons 1991 hit "Hold Me in Your Arms" (the song with which Noll auditioned for Australian Idol) and the other being a cover of the Michael Jackson hit "Gone Too Soon". Noll performed "Gone Too Soon" to a tearful audience during the broadcast of the 2004 Allan Border Medal as a tribute to Australian cricketer David Hookes, who was killed during an altercation at a Melbourne bar several months earlier.

=== Music video ===
The video, directed by Ryan Renshaw, was the fourth music video from Shannon Noll. The video contains scenes from a live performance Noll undertook at the venue "Seagulls" in Tweed Heads. The non-performance sequences of the video were filmed over a two-night period in Brisbane, Australia. The video begins with Shannon leaving a venue after finishing a live performance. As he leaves the venue out the back entrance, he is set upon by a group of paparazzi which he evades and he runs to catch a taxi to the train station to travel back home. The video was popular with fans as it was the first video in which Shannon plays a character, rather than only performing the track for the camera.

=== Track listing ===
Australian CD single

1. "Learn to Fly" – 4:11
2. "Gone Too Soon" (Larry Grossman, Buz Kohan) – 3:41
3. "Hold Me in Your Arms" (Phil Buckle) – 4:03

=== Charts ===
==== Weekly charts ====
Chart (2004)	Peak position
Australia (ARIA)	1

==== Year-end charts ====
Chart (2004)	Position
Australia (ARIA)	68

=== Certifications ===
Region	Certification	Certified units/sales
Australia (ARIA)	Gold	35,000^{^}
^{^} Shipments figures based on certification alone.
