= Loud (Shannon Noll song) =

2007 single by Shannon Noll

Single by Shannon Noll

from the album Turn It Up
- B-side: "The World Outside"
- Released: 3 September 2007
- Length: 3:11
- Label: Sony BMG
- Songwriters: Andy Stochansky, James Michael
- Producer: Luke Ebbin

Shannon Noll singles chronology
"Don't Give Up" (2006)	"Loud" (2007)	"In Pieces" (2007)

"Loud" is a song by Australian singer Shannon Noll, released as the first single from his third album, Turn It Up (2007). The single's B-side is "The World Outside", a non-album track. Noll previewed this track during his 2006 "Now I Run" National Tour.

"Loud" was released on 3 September 2007 and debuted at number three on the Australian Singles Chart. The song was heavily used in various promotions, namely the 2007 NRL Finals Series. Noll additionally performed the song live as part of the pre-game entertainment for the 2007 NRL Grand Final.

== Track listings ==
Australian CD single

1. "Loud" – 3:11
2. "The World Outside" – 3:05

Digital EP

1. "Loud" (single version) – 3:11
2. "The World Outside" – 3:06
3. "Fragile" – 3:23

== Charts ==
=== Weekly charts ===
Chart (2007)	Peak position
Australia (ARIA)	3

=== Year-end charts ===
Chart (2007)	Position
Australia (ARIA)	91
Australian Artists (ARIA)	23
