= In Pieces (song) =

2007 single by Shannon Noll

Single by Shannon Noll

from the album Turn It Up
- Released: 26 November 2007
- Recorded: 2007
- Length: 3:33
- Label: Sony BMG
- Songwriter(s): Bobby Huff, Eric Silver
- Producer(s): Luke Ebbin

Shannon Noll singles chronology
"Loud" (2007)	"In Pieces" (2007)	"Everybody Needs a Little Help" (2008)

"In Pieces" was the second single to be taken from Australian singer Shannon Noll's third album, Turn It Up (2007). The track was released as a CD single on 26 November 2007 and reached number 26 on the Australian Singles Chart.

== Track listings ==
Australian CD single

1. "In Pieces"
2. "Tomorrow"

Australian digital EP

1. "In Pieces" – 3:34
2. "Tomorrow" – 3:58
3. "Walls" (live at The Basement) – 3:44

== Charts ==
Chart (2007)	Peak position
Australia (ARIA)	26
