= What About Me (Moving Pictures song) =

1982 single by Moving Pictures

- Australian vinyl release (January 1982)

Single by Moving Pictures

from the album Days of Innocence
- B-side: "Round Again"
- Released: January 1982
- Recorded: 1981
- Genre: Rock
- Length: 3:38; 3:32 (single remix)
- Label: Wheatley
- Songwriters: Garry Frost; Frances Swan
- Producer: Charles Fisher

Moving Pictures singles chronology
"Bustin' Loose" (1981)	"What About Me" (1982)	"Sweet Cherie" (1982)

"What About Me" is a song written by Garry Frost and Frances Swan. It was first recorded by Australian rock band Moving Pictures, of which Garry Frost was a member, for its 1981 debut album, Days of Innocence. It became the band's first and only number-one single in Australia, spending six weeks atop the Kent Music Report; it was the second-highest-selling single of 1982 there. At the 1982 Countdown Music Awards, the song won Best Australian Single. In January 2018, as part of Triple M's "Ozzest 100", the 'most Australian' songs of all time, "What About Me" was ranked number 37.

The success of the song in Australia led to its American release. "What About Me" subsequently reached number 29 on the Billboard Hot 100 chart, ending 1983 as the 88th-most-successful single of the year in the US. The song re-charted in 1989, reaching number 46. In January 2004, Australian Idol season 1 runner-up Shannon Noll released a cover of the song that topped Australia's ARIA Singles Chart for four weeks and ended the year as Australia's most successful single. Noll's version was also a surprise hit in Ireland, where it debuted and peaked at number two in October 2004.

== Background ==
Frost wrote the song when he was working with autistic children in his day job. He had gone out to get lunch at his local shop in the Sydney suburb of Asquith and saw a small boy not being noticed waiting at the counter. He was sufficiently moved by the vision to write the song. The song was rarely played live by the band; when it was, it was played in a modern country style. It would never have been recorded but their debut album's producer Charles Fisher heard Frost and Smith tinkering with the tune on the studio piano during a break in recording. Fisher suggested that Moving Pictures record the song. It was initially released as a single in January 1982.

== Chart performance ==
The song debuted on Australia's Kent Music Report in February 1982 and reached number one five weeks later, where it remained for six weeks, going on to become the second biggest-selling single in Australia for 1982 (behind Survivor's "Eye of the Tiger"). It went on to win the "Best Single" award at the 1982 Countdown Music Awards. The song was also a top 20 hit in New Zealand, debuting at number 46 in June 1982 and peaking at number 17 six weeks later. It remained in the top 50 for a further five weeks.

"What About Me" was released in the United States in September 1982, reaching number 29 and spending 26 weeks on the Billboard Hot 100 in part due to significant play of the music video on then nascent MTV. Because of its longevity on the Hot 100, the song was able to end up on the Billboard year-end chart at number 88. It was re-released in the US market in 1989 by Geffen Records, climbing to number 46 on its second attempt. With a total of 43 weeks on the chart from its two separate releases, it tied what was then the record for most total weeks on the Hot 100.

== Track listings ==
Australian release

1. "What About Me" (Garry Frost, Frances Swan) – 3:38
2. "Round Again" (Alex Smith, Garry Frost) – 4:03

US release

1. "What About Me" (Garry Frost, Frances Swan) – 3:37
2. "Joni and the Romeo" (Alex Smith) – 3:28

== Charts ==
=== Weekly charts ===
Chart (1982–1983)	Peak position
Australia (Kent Music Report)	1
New Zealand (Recorded Music NZ)	17
US Billboard Hot 100	29
US Cash Box Top 100	21

Chart (1989)	Peak position
US Billboard Hot 100	46
US Adult Contemporary (Billboard)	43

=== Year-end charts ===
Chart (1982)	Position
Australia (Kent Music Report)	2

Chart (1983)	Position
US Billboard Hot 100	88

== Certifications and sales ==
Region	Certification	Certified units/sales
Australia (ARIA)	Gold	50,000^{^}
^{^} Shipments figures based on certification alone.

== Shannon Noll version ==
"What About Me"

Single by Shannon Noll

from the album That's What I'm Talking About
- B-side: "The Way That I Feel"
- Released: 26 January 2004
- Studio: Eargasm, Studios 301 (Sydney, Australia)
- Length: 3:21
- Label: BMG Australia
- Songwriters: Garry Frost; Frances Swan
- Producer: Bryon Jones

Shannon Noll singles chronology
"What About Me" (2004)	"Drive" (2004)

Australian Idol series one runner-up Shannon Noll covered the song for his debut album, That's What I'm Talking About (2004). He first performed the song on Australian Idol with the genre of number-one hits, where he received positive comments by the judges and was also seen as one of the highlights of the debut season of Idol. Noll's version went on to become Australia's highest-selling single of 2004.

=== Release and reception ===
Noll's version of "What About Me" was released in Australia as a CD single on 26 January 2004. The single debuted at number one on the ARIA Singles Chart on the week ending 8 February 2004, achieving double-platinum accreditation (140,000 copies shipped) in its debut week. The song stayed at the top of the chart for four weeks and eventually sold over 280,000 copies (certified quadruple platinum) in Australia alone, and it became the highest-selling single of Australia for 2004. In New Zealand, Noll's version bested Moving Pictures' original by seven positions, climbing to number 10 in May 2004 and spending 24 weeks in the top 50. At the end of the year, the song came in at number 38 on New Zealand's year-end chart.

Following several plays on Irish radio by a former Australian DJ, requests for "What About Me" in Ireland skyrocketed, and due to public demand, the Australian pressing of the single was shipped to Ireland. The initial shipment sold out within the first week of sale, prompting a further larger shipment to be made soon after. "What About Me" spent almost six months on the Irish Singles Chart and peaked at number two for two weeks in late October 2004.

=== Music video ===
The video, directed by Australian director Anthony Rose, was the second music video from Shannon Noll. Set and filmed over two days in Shannon's home town of Condobolin, NSW with temperatures exceeding 38 °C (100 °F), the video is essentially a snapshot of outback Australia and depicts Shannon's life in the small country town. The extras in the video for "What About Me" are all local Condobolin residents, including Shannon's two brothers. The music video was later popularly parodied by comedian Rove McManus on his television show Rove Live.

=== Track listing ===
Australian CD single

1. "What About Me" – 3:21
2. "What About Me" (Sterling remix) – 3:27
3. "The Way That I Feel" – 3:29

=== Credits and personnel ===
Credits are lifted from the Australian CD single liner notes.

Studios

- Recorded at Eargasm Studios and Studios 301 (Sydney, Australia)
- Mastered at Studios 301 (Sydney, Australia)

Personnel

- Garry Frost – writing
- Frances Swan – writing
- Shannon Noll – vocals
- Jak Housden – guitars
- Sam Dixon – bass
- Lee Maloney – additional drums
- Bryon Jones – production
- Craig Porteils – co-production
- Adam Reilly – co-production, programming
- Craig Porteils – engineering
- David Hemming – mixing
- Oscar Gaona – mastering
- David Caplice – management
- Sussanne Caccamo – artwork design
- David Anderson – photography

=== Charts ===
==== Weekly charts ====
Chart (2004)	Peak position
Australia (ARIA)	1
Ireland (IRMA)	2
New Zealand (Recorded Music NZ)	10

==== Year-end charts ====
Chart (2004)	Position
Australia (ARIA)	1
New Zealand (RIANZ)	38

==== Decade-end charts ====
Chart (2000–2009)	Position
Australia (ARIA)	5

=== Certifications ===
Region	Certification	Certified units/sales
Australia (ARIA)	4× Platinum	280,000^{^}
^{^} Shipments figures based on certification alone.
