= Shannon Noll =

Australian singer-songwriter (born 1975)

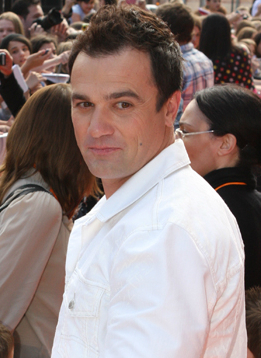
- Noll at the Nickelodeon Australian Kids' Choice Awards in Sydney on 7 October 2011

Background information
- Born: Shannon Neil Noll; 16 September 1975 (age 51); Orange, New South Wales, Australia
- Origin: Condobolin, New South Wales, Australia
- Genre: Rock
- Occupations: Singer-songwriter, author
- Instruments: Vocals, guitar, piano
- Years active: 2001–present
- Labels: Sony, Universal
- Website: www.shannonnoll.com

Shannon Neil Noll (born 16 September 1975) is an Australian singer-songwriter who first came to prominence as runner-up of the first season of Australian Idol in 2003, which led to him being signed to Sony BMG. He has released five top-ten albums, including two number-one multi-platinum sellers. Noll's first ten singles all peaked inside the ARIA top ten, including three that reached number one. He is the only Australian male artist in Australian chart history to have ten consecutive top-ten singles. Noll's debut single, "What About Me?", was certified 4× platinum and became the highest-selling single of 2004 in Australia.

With 17 platinum and three gold certifications and combined album and single sales of over 1.3 million in Australia, Noll has the third-highest certification and sales level for an Australian Idol contestant. Noll has received six ARIA Music Award nominations, including Best Pop Release for his second album Lift, and has won five ARIA No. 1 Chart Awards. He also won the MTV Australia Video Music Award for Best Male Artist three years in succession between 2005 and 2007. In 2010, Noll ended his contract with Sony, briefly signed with Universal Music Australia before signing with Warner Music Australia, to release his fifth studio album Unbroken in February 2018.

In January 2018, he was revealed as a celebrity contestant on the fourth season of the Australian version of I'm a Celebrity...Get Me Out of Here!, and in August 2022, he was revealed to be the "Blowfly" on the fourth season of Network 10's The Masked Singer Australia.

== Early life ==
Noll was born on 16 September 1975 in Orange, New South Wales, to Neil and Sharyn Noll. He grew up in the small town of Tullibigeal in central western New South Wales as the youngest of three children with his older brothers Adam and Damian. Noll spent his entire childhood and teenage years on the family farm, which raised sheep and cattle and grew cereal crops. At school, he enjoyed drama classes and performed in school productions. After leaving school, he traveled to Sydney where he met his wife Rochelle Ogston and played AFL. As an adult, Noll worked shearing sheep among other tasks. He and his brothers formed the band called Cypress (named after the Cypress pine timber mill where they rehearsed). He provided vocals and played guitar. In gigs around the Australian outback, the band played in country pubs. Although they performed mainly covers, the group also wrote original music. Noll's father Neil was killed during a farming accident in 2001, which left the farm to him and his brothers. After two years of extreme drought, Noll leased the farm out and got by on drought support money and odd-jobbing on a friend's farm. He penned a song on his album Lift titled "Now I Run" in his father's memory.

== Career ==
=== 2003–2004: Australian Idol and That's What I'm Talking About ===
In 2003, Noll successfully auditioned for the first season of Australian Idol, singing Southern Sons' "Hold Me in Your Arms". His audition impressed all three judges, including Marcia Hines who told him that she had just discovered "a voice" and Ian Dickson who informed Noll that "Australia will love you". Following the semi-final process, Noll had advanced through to the top twelve. He eventually progressed through to the grand final with Guy Sebastian, following contestant Cosima De Vito's withdrawal from the competition. The grand final was held on 19 November 2003 at the Sydney Opera House. After the viewer votes had been tallied it was announced that Guy Sebastian was the winner.

Shortly after Idol Noll signed a five-album deal with BMG Australia, which later merged with Sony. He then embarked on the Australian Idol national tour in January 2004, with eleven other contestants from the top twelve. That same month Noll released his cover of the Moving Pictures song "What About Me?" as his debut single. It debuted at number one on the ARIA Singles Chart and spent four consecutive weeks at the top spot. "What About Me" was the highest-selling single of 2004 in Australia and was certified 4× platinum for shipments of 280,000 copies. The song also reached number two in Ireland and number ten in New Zealand. Noll's debut album That's What I'm Talking About was released on 9 February 2004, and debuted at number one on the ARIA Albums Chart with first-week sales of 131,680 copies. Containing a mixture of pop, rock and country tracks, the album spent fourteen weeks in the top ten, including four weeks at number one, and was certified 5× platinum for shipments of 350,000 copies.

The second single "Drive", an uptempo rock track written by Canadian singer Bryan Adams, reached number four in Australia and was certified platinum for shipments of 70,000 copies. Noll's cover of boy band A1's "Learn to Fly" was released as the third and final single from That's What I'm Talking About. It became his second number one single and was certified gold for shipments of 35,000 copies. Noll received two nominations at the 2004 ARIA Music Awards, including Highest Selling Single for "What About Me" and Highest Selling Album for That's What I'm Talking About. He embarked on his first solo headlining tour titled The Overdrive Tour in April 2004 to promote the album. In August 2004 Noll starred in a TV special on Network Ten titled Up Close with Shannon Noll, which was hosted by Ian Dickson. By late 2004 the Nine Network had approached Noll to re-record the Australian cricket anthem "C'mon Aussie C'mon" with updated lyrics. His version peaked at number two and was certified platinum. All proceeds from the single went towards Red Cross' Good Start Breakfast Club, a community initiative set up to ensure all Australian school children start the day with a healthy breakfast.

=== 2005–2006: Lift ===
In early 2005, Noll went on a songwriting trip to the United States and the United Kingdom to work on his second album with Desmond Child, Dianne Warren and Wayne Hector. He later decided not to use any of the material he wrote with Child and also passed on a song by Warren because he preferred his work with local Australian songwriters. Throughout February and March 2005, Noll opened for Bryan Adams on the Australian leg of his Room Service Tour. His second album Lift was released on 16 October 2005, and debuted at number one. The album, with 11 out of 13 tracks co-written by Noll, covered topics including finding love, death, overcoming odds and self belief. It spent nine weeks in the top ten and was certified 3× platinum for shipments of 210,000 copies. The lead single "Shine" also debuted at number one and was certified platinum. It's music video was directed by Ryan Renshaw. The album's title track and second single "Lift" peaked at number 10 and was certified gold. It was later chosen as the theme song for the Australian version of reality series The Biggest Loser. Two further singles were released from the album, "Now I Run" which peaked at number six and "Lonely" which peaked at number eight. Noll received two nominations at the 2006 ARIA Music Awards, including Highest Selling Single for "Shine" and Best Pop Release for Lift. He embarked on his second solo headlining tour titled the Lift Tour in January 2006 to promote the album.

Noll was set to star in the film King of the Mountain, based loosely on the life of Australian racer Peter Brock, but he declined the offer. In September 2006 Noll dropped Sydney firm Caplice Management and signed with New York-based management group Worldwide Entertainment Group (WEG). The decision was seen as part of his effort to gain success in the US, after having previously put on showcase performances for music industry executives with no luck. He supported American rock band Live on their Australian tour the following month. In December 2006 Noll and Natalie Bassingthwaighte released a cover of the Peter Gabriel and Kate Bush duet "Don't Give Up" which peaked at number two and was certified platinum, after spending eleven consecutive weeks in the top ten. It served as the lead single from the compilation album Home: Songs of Hope & Journey, which was released to raise funds for beyondblue's depression research activities. "Don't Give Up" earned Noll a nomination for Highest Selling Single at the ARIA Music Awards the following year.

=== 2007–2009: Turn It Up, No Turning Back: The Story So Far and What Matters the Most ===
In September 2007, Noll made his theatrical debut as Parson Nathaniel in the Australian tour of the stage musical Jeff Wayne's Musical Version of The War of the Worlds. His third album, Turn It Up, was released on 15 September 2007; it debuted at number three and was certified platinum. Noll had travelled to the US earlier that year to work on the album with several songwriters and producers, including Richard Marx, Luke Ebbin and Bon Jovi guitarist Richie Sambora. The anthemic rock tune "Loud" was released as the lead single from Turn It Up and debuted at number three. The second single "In Pieces" reached number 26, while the third single "Everybody Needs a Little Help" did not chart. Noll embarked on his third solo headlining tour, titled the Turn It Up Tour, in June 2008 to promote the album.

Noll was honoured in an episode of the Australian version of This Is Your Life. His first compilation album No Turning Back: The Story So Far was released on 27 September 2008, and debuted at number seven. The album included ten of Noll's hit singles and five new tracks. His cover of the Brian Melo song "Summertime" was released as the only single from the album and peaked at number 54. He embarked on his No Turning Back Tour to promote the album's release. In June 2009, Noll again appeared as Parson Nathaniel in the UK tour of Jeff Wayne's Musical Version of The War of the Worlds. Noll's second compilation album What Matters the Most, featuring songs from his previous albums, was released in the UK to coincide with the tour but it did not chart. Two of his previous singles, "Shine" and "Now I Run", were re-released to accompany the album's UK release. He returned to Australia the following month for his acoustic In the Raw Tour, which featured a special Q&A session with host Nick Bennett.

=== 2010–2014: A Million Suns ===
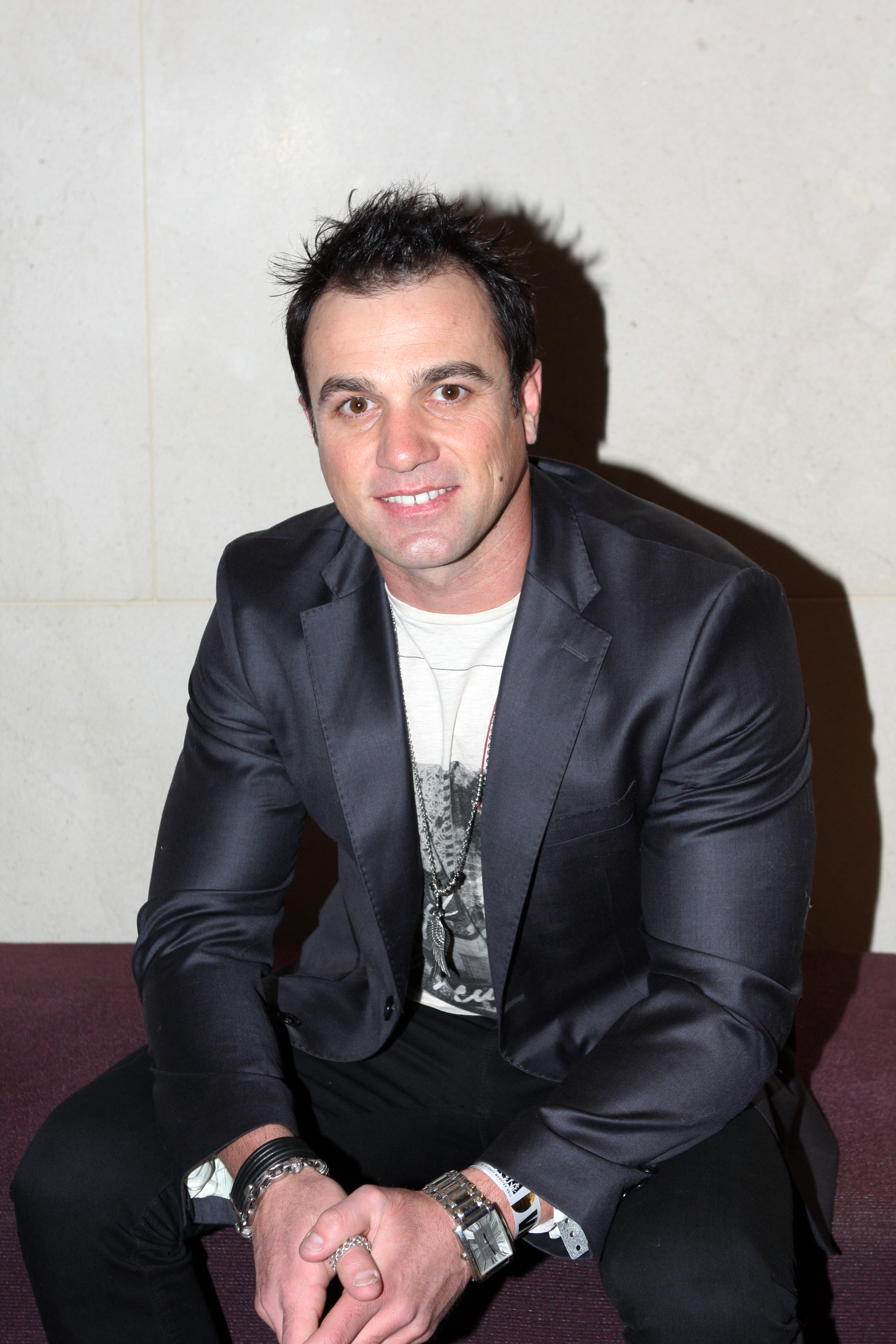
Noll in July 2011

In January 2010, Noll announced that he had parted ways with Sony, adding that it was time for a fresh start elsewhere. He later signed with Universal Music Australia and released his fourth album A Million Suns on 14 October 2011 which debuted at number eight. The lead single "Switch Me On" was co-written by Benji Madden of Good Charlotte, and its music video was filmed in Tokyo. "Switch Me On" reached number 42 and was certified gold. Three further singles "My Place in the Line", "Living in Stereo" and "Rewind" all failed to chart. Noll embarked on his A Million Suns Tour in 2012 to promote the album. In April 2012, Noll became a contestant on the twelfth season of Dancing with the Stars Australia and was partnered with professional dancer Elena Samodanova. He was forced to withdraw from the competition the following month after suffering a severe spinal injury while rehearsing a lift with Samodanova.

Noll released the single "Man I Can Trust" on 1 October 2012 to coincide with the release of his autobiography Shannon Noll: So Far, which he wrote with Sydney writer Alan Whiticker. The book explores Noll's early days on the family farm, the pain his family suffered following his father's death, his depression and drug usage, as well as the battles he waged against his critics and the music industry. From November 2012 to February 2013, Noll embarked on his In My Youth Tour which featured him performing acoustic covers of songs from the '80s that were chosen by his fans. In late 2013 Noll became the featured promoter of South Australian retailer Radio Rentals and its sister brand RT Edwards in Queensland. The commercials for Radio Rentals and RT Edwards featured Noll singing the Roy Orbison hit "You Got It". He embarked on his Invincible Tour in February 2014 and performed a mixture of old and new songs.

Also in 2014, Noll featured on "Beyond These City Lights", a duet with Australian country rock artist Jayne Denham. The single reached number one on Australian country radio and received a Golden Guitar nomination for Vocal Collaboration of the Year at the 2014 awards.

Noll released "We Only Live Once" in July 2014 as the lead single from his next album, but it did not chart. The single's music video featured an appearance by Miss Universe finalist Renae Ayris. Noll embarked on his We Only Live Once Tour in September 2014 to support the single's release.

=== 2016–2024: Unbroken and Raw ===
On 30 September 2016, Noll released the single "Who I Am", from his forthcoming fifth studio album. On 5 May 2017, Noll released the single "Southern Sky" This was followed by the release of a video and announcement of a national tour on 9 May. On 4 December, Noll and his record label Warner Music announced his fifth studio album is titled Unbroken and was released in Australia on 2 February 2018. In January 2018, Noll competed in the fourth season of the Australian I'm a Celebrity...Get Me Out of Here!. He was announced as runner-up on the show's finale on 12 March 2018.

On 4 November 2019, Noll released a song titled "Long Live the Summer", which was the lead single for his forthcoming sixth studio album. He then went on to release a track called "Wonderful", on 20 November 2020, which was featured as the second single for the album. In 2020, Noll toured across New South Wales and performed over 30 intimate and acoustic shows. Following this successful run of shows, fans requested an album based on these shows. The album includes the first song written entirely by Noll. The third and final single of the album was a song titled "Better", which was released on 23 April 2021. Noll's sixth studio album, titled Raw, was officially released on 28 May 2021 and was supported by the Raw & Uncovered Australian tour. Upon release, Noll said the album "features some new songs plus new recordings of many of the songs you love hearing at my live shows plus covers of some Aussie classics." Raw debuted at number 3 on the ARIA Charts, becoming his sixth consecutive top ten studio album. At the end of the year, the album was positioned at number 49 on the ARIA Year End Charts for Australian Country Albums.

In August 2022, Noll was revealed to be Blowfly on the fourth season of Network 10's The Masked Singer Australia, where he placed fifth overall. On 23 August, he released his first song for 2022, a non-album single titled "Take Me Away". In September 2022, he released two remixed versions of his 2004 hit song "What About Me". In Early 2023, Noll released a podcast titled Idol Talking With Nollsie, to coincide with the return of Australian Idol, which had been picked up by the Seven Network. In April 2023, he released another single titled "Believe It", which was his first release of that year, and revealed that he was working on his seventh studio album.

=== 2025–present: The Road in Front of Me ===
In September 2026, Noll released The Road in Front of Me

== Charity ==
Noll has to date donated well over $1 million to various charities throughout Australia. Most notably he donated the earnings from two of his platinum singles, "C'mon Aussie C'mon" and "Don't Give Up". Noll additionally makes appearances and personally raises funds for charities.

Noll regularly appears in fundraisers for Movember, a foundation that supports research into testicular cancer.

== Legacy ==
Noll has become a popular Internet meme, particularly in Australia. The popular phrase "Shannon Noll was robbed of the 2003 Australian Idol title" gained popularity in 2015, with multiple Facebook pages appearing featuring the phrase. Noll acknowledged the internet fame, finding it "very funny" and stating, "Some of the stuff they've done is bloody brilliant and very clever and very funny. I reckon half of the kids putting together these memes need to be on my marketing team!" In January 2016, a Facebook page was created titled "Get Shannon Noll to Groovin' the Moo 2016". Despite the page's thousands of likes, the organisers of Groovin' the Moo did not reach out to the artist to perform. In June 2016, the 'GATchphrase' for the 2016 GAT (a theme chosen by the VCE students of Victoria to write into their papers to show group protest) was voted to be Shannon Noll was robbed of the 2003 Australian Idol title. An estimated 3,600 took part in this event.

== Personal life ==
Noll married his long-time girlfriend Rochelle Ogston at St Peter's Church in Cremorne, New South Wales, on 2 October 2004. They have three sons and a daughter.

== Legal issues ==
In December 2004, Noll was caught driving drunk in his home town of Condobolin. He promptly admitted that it was a "stupid mistake". On 5 April 2005, Noll pleaded guilty in court to driving with a blood alcohol reading of 0.11. The magistrate disqualified him from driving for nine months, fined him $1,000, and ordered him to pay court costs.

On 15 January 2017, Noll was arrested for assaulting a bouncer at an Adelaide strip club. He was charged with two counts of assault and was scheduled to appear at the Adelaide magistrates court in February 2017. The charges were dropped during a brief court hearing on 6 April 2017.

In July 2018 during a gig at the Duck Creek Picnic Races in Nyngan, New South Wales, Noll launched an almost two-minute tirade at a crowd member who threw a can of beer on stage, receiving appreciative support from the crowd. A video of the incident recorded on a phone, in which Noll angrily responds to the beer can incident with an outburst including "Fucking private school, stupid fucking motherfucker... Have some balls and come up here and I'll punch your fucking teeth down your throat out the back, dog-arse prick. Then I'll fuck your missus and your mum," went viral. Noll later apologised on Facebook, writing: "I completely understand that that is still no excuse for the way I spoke and I am deeply sorry for the terrible things I said that were purely out of frustration." Noll was dropped from a Queensland Rodeo as a result of the outburst. The crowd's reaction during the incident, appearing to goad Noll into threats of violence was widely reported as disturbing. In his apology, Noll blamed his outburst on one of his band previously getting hurt when a firecracker was thrown on stage, and the large number of beer cans being thrown at the band.

On 13 September 2018, Noll was charged after NSW police allegedly found him with a bag of "white powder" while searching the premises of the Caringbah Hotel, Caringbah. On 11 October 2018, Noll was placed on a 12-month good behaviour bond after pleading guilty to cocaine possession. The magistrate chose not to record a criminal conviction.

== Discography ==
- That's What I'm Talking About (2004)
- Lift (2005)
- Turn It Up (2007)
- A Million Suns (2011)
- Unbroken (2018)
- Raw (2021)
- The Road in Front of Me (2026)

== Tours ==
Headlining tours

- The Overdrive Tour (2004)
- Lift Tour (2006)
- Turn It Up Tour (2008)
- No Turning Back Tour (2008)
- In the Raw Tour (2009)
- A Million Suns Tour (2012)
- In My Youth Tour (2012–13)
- Invincible Tour (2014)
- We Only Live Once Tour (2014)

Joint tours

- Australian Idol Tour (2004)
- Jeff Wayne's Musical Version of The War of the Worlds: Australia (2007)
- Jeff Wayne's Musical Version of The War of the Worlds: United Kingdom (2009)

Supporting tours

- Bryan Adams' Room Service Tour: Australian leg (2005)
- Live's Australian Tour (2006)

== Awards and nominations ==
=== APRA Awards ===
The APRA Awards is an annual awards ceremony held by the Australasian Performing Right Association to recognise songwriting skills, sales and airplay performance by its members annually. Noll has won one award from two nominations.

Year	Nominee / work	Award	Result
2007	"Lift"	Most Performed Australian Work	Won
2012	"Switch Me On"	Rock Work of the Year	Nominated

=== ARIA Music Awards ===
The ARIA Music Awards are a set of annual ceremonies presented by Australian Recording Industry Association (ARIA), which recognise excellence, innovation and achievement across all genres of the music of Australia. They commenced in 1987. Noll has received six nominations.

Year	Nominee / work	Award	Result
2004	"What About Me"	Highest Selling Single	Nominated
2004	That's What I'm Talking About	Highest Selling Album	Nominated
2006	"Shine"	Highest Selling Single	Nominated
2006	Lift	Best Pop Release	Nominated
2007	"Don't Give Up"	Highest Selling Single	Nominated
2011	Shannon Noll	Most Popular Australian Live Artist	Nominated

=== ARIA No. 1 Chart Awards ===
The ARIA No. 1 Chart Awards are given to Australian recording artists who have achieved a number-one single or album on the ARIA Charts. Noll has won five awards.

Year	Nominee / work	Award	Result
2004	That's What I'm Talking About	Number One Album	Won
2004	"What About Me"	Number One Single	Won
2004	"Learn to Fly"	Number One Single	Won
2005	Lift	Number One Album	Won
2005	"Shine"	Number One Single	Won

=== Country Music Awards (CMAA) ===
The Country Music Awards of Australia (CMAA) (also known as the Golden Guitar Awards) is an annual awards night held in January during the Tamworth Country Music Festival, celebrating recording excellence in the Australian country music industry. They have been held annually since 1973.

Year	Nominee / work	Award	Result
2014	"Beyond These City Lights" (with Jayne Denham)	Vocal Collaboration of the Year	Nominated
2016	"Spirit of the Anzacs" (with Lee Kernaghan, Guy Sebastian, Jessica Mauboy, Jon Stevens, Sheppard and Megan Washington)	Vocal Collaboration of the Year	Won
2016	"Spirit of the Anzacs" (with Lee Kernaghan, Guy Sebastian, Jessica Mauboy, Jon Stevens, Sheppard and Megan Washington)	Video clip of the Year	Won

=== MTV Australia Video Music Awards ===
The MTV Australia Video Music Awards was an awards ceremony presented by MTV Australia that honoured the best music videos of both local and international acts. Noll won three awards.

Year	Nominee / work	Award	Result
2005	Shannon Noll	Best Male Artist	Won
2006	Shannon Noll	Best Male Artist	Won
2007	Shannon Noll	Best Male Artist	Won

=== Nickelodeon Australian Kids' Choice Awards ===
The Nickelodeon Australian Kids' Choice Awards was an awards ceremony that honoured the biggest television, movie and music acts, as voted by the public. Noll won three awards.

Year	Nominee / work	Award	Result
2004	Shannon Noll	Fave Australian	Won
2004	"Drive"	Fave Song	Won
2007	Shannon Noll	Fave Male Singer	Won

== See also ==
- List of highest-certified singles in Australia
- List of artists who reached number one on the Australian singles chart
