= Byron Bay Bluesfest =

Annual music festival in New South Wales, Australia

Coordinates: 28°35′12.67″S 153°32′48.31″E

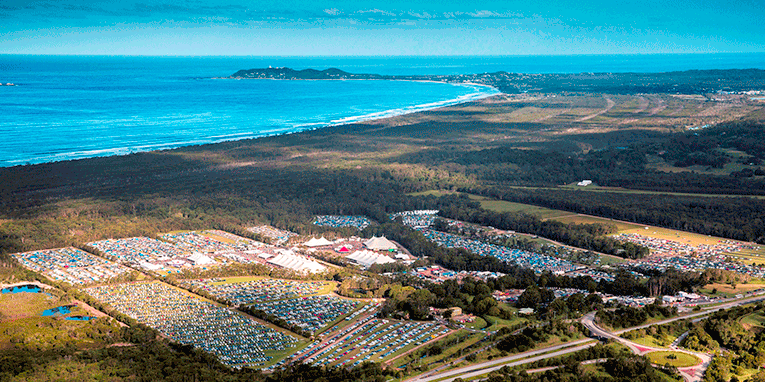
- 2014 festival from above
- Genre: Blues, roots
- Locations: Byron Bay, New South Wales
- Years active: 1990–2019, 2022–2025
- Founders: Keven Oxford, Karin Oxford and Dan Doeppel
- Most recent: 17–20 April 2025
- Organizer: Peter Noble
- Website: bluesfest.com.au

Byron Bay Bluesfest was an Australian music festival held over the Easter long weekend in the Byron Bay region of New South Wales. It began in 1990 at the Arts Factory as the East Coast Annual Blues Festival and was later known as the East Coast International Blues & Roots Music Festival. The event presented blues, roots and a broad range of other musical genres.

The festival subsequently moved through several locations, including Belongil Fields and Red Devil Park, before Byron Events Farm at Tyagarah became its final home. It also hosted the Boomerang program, a festival within the festival that showcased Indigenous performers and music, art and culture.

The 2020 and 2021 editions were cancelled during the COVID-19 pandemic, before Bluesfest returned in 2022. In August 2024, festival director Peter Noble announced that the 2025 event would be the last, but organisers announced a 2026 return during the 2025 festival. The 2026 event was cancelled less than three weeks before it was due to begin, and the two Bluesfest entities entered liquidation.

== History ==
Bluesfest began at the Arts Factory in Byron Bay in 1990 as the East Coast Annual Blues Festival. The inaugural event attracted approximately 6,000 people.

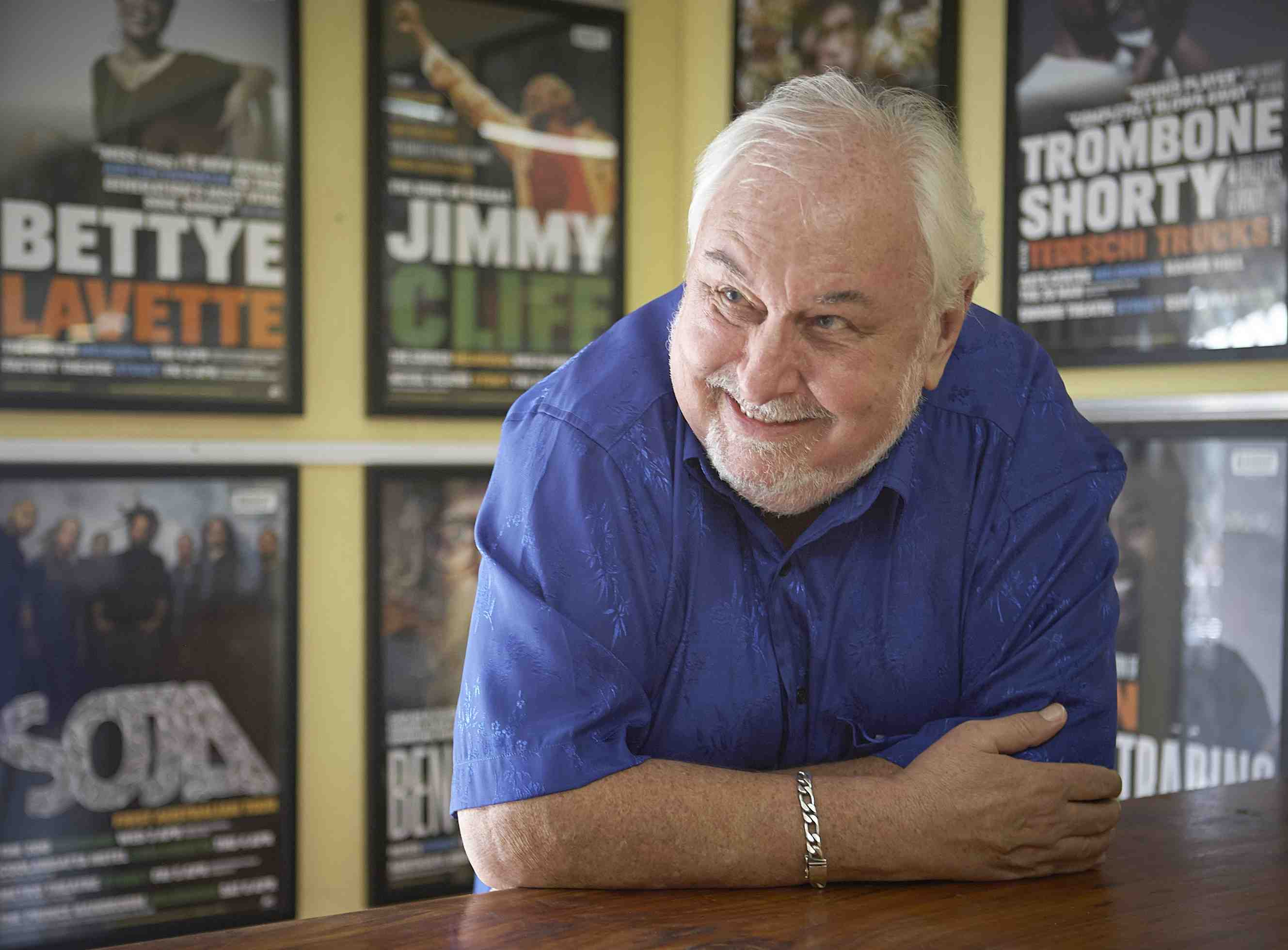
Bluesfest director Peter Noble

The festival was founded by local promoters Keven Oxford, Karin Oxford and Dan Doeppel. Peter Noble joined as a co-director for the 1994 festival.

In December 2004, Keven Oxford sold his 50 per cent stake in the festival to a consortium comprising Michael Chugg, Daryl Herbert and Glenn Wheatley. Noble later bought out the consortium and became the festival’s sole owner.

The festival later moved through Belongil Fields and Red Devil Park before relocating to the 120-hectare Tyagarah Tea Tree Farm in 2010, which became its final venue.

=== 2013: Boomerang Festival launch ===
In October 2013, the inaugural Boomerang Festival was held as an independent Indigenous cultural festival at the Bluesfest site, directed and curated by Rhoda Roberts in partnership with Bluesfest director Peter Noble. In 2016, Boomerang was incorporated into Bluesfest for the first time as a festival within the festival. Its program focused on Indigenous performance, art and culture.

=== 2020 & 2021 cancellations ===
Due to event restrictions imposed during the COVID-19 pandemic, the 2020 festival was the first Bluesfest to be cancelled in its history.

In February 2021, the NSW Government approved the festival’s COVID-safe plan for a reduced-capacity, fully seated event featuring Australian artists. The event, scheduled for 1–5 April, was cancelled one day before it began after a COVID-19 case was detected in Byron Bay and a public health order was issued by Brad Hazzard. Live Performance Australia estimated that the cancellation caused an A$10 million loss, while a local business owner estimated Bluesfest’s value to the local economy at A$100 million.

A rescheduled October event was cancelled on 17 August.

=== 2022–2026 ===
Following the cancellation of the 2020 and 2021 editions, Bluesfest returned from 14 to 18 April 2022.

In September 2022, organisers announced that the 34th annual Bluesfest would be held at Byron Events Farm from 6 to 10 April 2023. In November, the inaugural Bluesfest Melbourne was announced for 8 and 9 April. Controversy arose after Sticky Fingers was added to the Byron Bay line-up. King Gizzard & the Lizard Wizard and Sampa the Great withdrew from the festival, and festival director Peter Noble defended the booking. Following weeks of criticism, Sticky Fingers was removed from the line-up.

The 2024 festival was held from 28 March to 1 April. During the event, organisers announced that the 2025 festival would be shortened from five days to four, removing the Easter Monday program.

In August 2024, Noble announced that the 2025 event would be the final Bluesfest. Bluesfest said the 2025 festival attracted 109,000 patrons, the third-largest crowd in the event's 35-year history. During the festival, organisers announced that Bluesfest would return in 2026, drawing criticism from some attendees who said they had purchased tickets believing that 2025 would be the final edition.

The 2026 festival was scheduled for 2–5 April but was cancelled on 13 March, less than three weeks before it was due to begin. Organisers attributed the decision to rising production, logistics, insurance and touring costs, international uncertainty, challenging conditions for major live events, and declining ticket demand. The companies responsible for operating the festival and receiving its ticket income, Bluesfest Byron Bay Pty Ltd and Bluesfest Enterprises Pty Ltd, entered liquidation.

In June 2026, reports from the liquidator showed that the companies had combined debts exceeding $10 million. The liquidator reported that Bluesfest Byron Bay Pty Ltd may have become insolvent around October 2025. A confidential report was filed with the Australian Securities and Investments Commission flagging potential breaches of the Corporations Act. The liquidator said investigations were ongoing and had not reached conclusions about wrongdoing. In a statement through his lawyers, Noble said he was cooperating and had acted properly at all times.

== Awards ==
=== Bluesfest Awards ===
- 2024 Festival of the Year, Variety Live Business Breakfast
- 2023 Silver Major Festivals & Events, NSW Tourism Award
- 2022 Gold Major Festivals & Events, NSW Tourism Award
- 2019 Best Regional Event, Australian Event Awards
- 2018 Best Cultural, Arts or Music Event - Australian Event Awards
- 2017 Gold Major Festivals & Events - NSW Tourism Awards
- 2017 Best Regional Event, Australian Event Awards
- 2016 Gold Major Festival & Events, NSW Tourism Awards
- 2016 Best Regional Event, Australian Event Awards
- 2016 Gold Major Festivals & Events, North Coast Tourism Awards
- 2015 Gold Major Festivals & Events, NSW Tourism Awards
- 2015 Gold Major Festivals & Events, North Coast Tourism Awards
- 2015 Pan Australasian Festival Of The Year, Canadian Music Week International Festival Awards
- 2014 Best Cultural, Arts or Music Event, Australian Event Awards
- 2014 Best Contemporary Music Festival, Australian Helpmann Awards
- 2014 Gold Major Festival & Event, North Coast Tourism Awards
- 2014 Silver Major Festivals & Events, NSW Tourism Awards
- 2013 Gold Award for Business Excellence, Major Festivals and Events, North Coast Tourism Awards
- 2013 Gold Major Festivals & Events, NSW Tourism Awards
- 2013 Best Regional Event, Australian Event Awards
- 2013 Best Contemporary Music Festival Australian Helpmann Awards
- 2012 Silver Major Festival & Events, NSW Tourism Awards
- 2012 Business Excellence Award, Major Events and Festivals, North Coast Tourism Awards
- 2011 Gold Major Festivals & Events, NSW Tourism Awards
- 2011 Business Excellence Award, Major Events and Festivals, North Coast Tourism Awards
- 2010 Australian Event of the Year, Australian Event Awards
- 2010 Best Cultural or Arts event, Australian Event Awards
- 2006 Best Contemporary Music Festival, Australian Helpmann Awards
- 2005 Best Contemporary Music Festival, Australian Helpmann Awards
- 1998–2010 Readers Poll Award, Rhythms Magazine – "Best Australian Festival"
- 1994–1996 Readers Poll Award, Rhythms Magazine – "Best Australian Festival"
- 2007–2013, The International A Greener Festival Award

=== Bluesfest nominations ===
- 2022 Pollstar Awards (USA) for International Music Festival of the Year
- 2022 Best Cultural, Arts or Music Event, Australian Event Awards
- 2021 Pollstar Awards (USA) for International Music Festival of the Decade
- 2019 Pollstar Awards (USA) for International Music Festival of the Year
- 2017 Best Contemporary Music Festival, Australian Helpmann Awards
- 2017 International Music Festival of the Year, 29th Pollstar Awards (2018)
- 2016 International Music Festival of the Year, 28th Pollstar Awards (2017)
- 2016 Best Contemporary Music Festival, Australian Helpmann Awards
- 2015 International Music Festival of the Year, 27th Pollstar Awards (2016)
- 2015 Best Contemporary Music Festival Australian Helpmann Awards
- 2014 International Music Festival of the Year, 26th Pollstar Awards (2015)
- 2014 Best Regional Event, Australian Event Awards
- 2014 Best Tourism Event, Australian Event Awards
- 2013 International Music Festival of the Year 25th Pollstar Awards (2014)
- 2013 Best Tourism Event, Australian Event Awards
- 2012 International Music Festival of the Year 24th Pollstar Awards (2013)
- 2012 Best Cultural, Arts or Music Event, Australian Event Awards
- 2012 Best Contemporary Music Festival, Helpmann Awards
- 2011 Best Regional Event, Australian Event Awards
- 2011 Best Achievement in Sustainability, Australian Event Awards
- 2009 Best Cultural or Arts Event, Australian Event Awards
- 2009 Best Overseas Festival, UK Festival Awards
- 2005 International Music Festival of the Year, Pollstar Concert Industry Awards

== Past lineups ==
=== 2007 ===
The line-up for the 2007 festival included:

- Rodriguez (US)
- Ben Harper and the Innocent Criminals (US)
- John Mayer (US)
- Missy Higgins
- Wolfmother
- Bela Fleck and the Flecktones (US)
- Bonnie Raitt (US)
- Bo Diddley (US)
- Taj Mahal (US)
- Tony Joe White (US)
- The Roots (US)
- Kasey Chambers
- John Butler Trio
- Fat Freddys Drop (NZ)
- Sierra Leone's Refugee All Stars (Sierra Leone)
- Fishbone (USA)
- Gomez (UK)
- Fred Eaglesmith (CAN)
- Kieran Kane and Kevin Welch with Fats Kaplin (US)
- Feist (Canada)
- The Waifs
- Ben Kweller (US)
- Flogging Molly (US)
- Xavier Rudd
- The NEO
- Pappa Jam

=== 2008 ===
The 2008 festival was held at the 26 acres (110,000 m^{2}) Belongil Fields, the original outdoor venue. The 2008 festival had more food and craft stalls, a covered area where festival goers could eat at tables, a chill-out area, plus an area for an additional, fifth stage.

Artists in 2008 included Buddy Guy, Eskimo Joe, The John Butler Trio, Gotye, The Beautiful Girls, Newton Faulkner, Seasick Steve, Charlie Musselwhite, Mavis Staples, John P. Hammond, John Hiatt, Ray Davies, Maceo Parker, Loudon Wainwright III, Ozomatli, Ruthie Foster, Jake Shimabukuro, Keith Urban, Amali Ward, Lior, MOFRO, Dan Sultan, Jeff Lang, The Cat Empire, Clare Bowditch, Raul Midon and Xavier Rudd.

=== 2011 ===
The line-up for the 2011 festival included:

- Bob Dylan
- B. B. King
- Grace Jones
- Ben Harper and Relentless7
- Elvis Costello and the Imposters
- Leon Russell
- George Clinton and Parliament-Funkadelic
- Jethro Tull
- ZZ Top
- John Legend
- Michael Franti and Spearhead
- Gurrumul
- Toots and the Maytals
- Luciano and Jah Messenjah Band
- Blind Boys of Alabama featuring Aaron Neville
- Paul Kelly
- Buffy Sainte-Marie
- Warren Haynes and his Allstar Band
- Rodrigo y Gabriela
- Fistful of Mercy
- Derek Trucks and Susan Tedeschi Band
- Imogen Heap
- Ernest Ranglin
- Robert Randolph and the Family Band
- The Cat Empire
- Mavis Staples
- Kasey Chambers
- Clare Bowditch
- Little Feat
- Indigo Girls
- Osibisa
- Tim Finn
- Raúl Malo
- Wolfmother
- Xavier Rudd
- Funky Meters
- Trombone Shorty and Orleans Avenue
- Irma Thomas
- Fishbone
- Los Lobos
- Trinity Roots
- Kate Miller-Heidke
- Michelle Shocked
- Jeff Lang
- Saltwater Band
- Washington
- Jack Thompson and the Original Sinner
- Peter Rowan Bluegrass Band
- Neil Murray
- Ash Grunwald
- Eli "Paperboy" Reed
- C. W. Stoneking
- Tim Robbins and the Rogues Gallery Band
- Eric Bibb
- Ruthie Foster
- Tony Joe White
- Joe Louis Walker
- Frank Yamma
- The Bamboos
- The Aggrolites
- Resin Dogs
- Yodelice
- Shane Nicholson
- Lisa Miller
- The Dingoes
- Leah Flanagan
- Bobby Long
- Lowrider
- Dale Watson and His Lone Stars
- Barrence Whitfield
- The Blackwater Fever
- Phil Jones and the Unknown Blues

=== 2012 ===
The line-up for the 2012 festival included:

- Cold Chisel
- John Fogerty performing the songs of Creedence Clearwater Revival
- Crosby, Stills & Nash
- Earth, Wind & Fire
- The Pogues
- The Specials
- John Butler Trio
- My Morning Jacket
- Yes
- Buddy Guy
- Donovan
- Lucinda Williams
- Maceo Parker
- G3 featuring Joe Satriani, Steve Vai and Steve Lukather
- Ziggy Marley
- Brian Setzer's Rockabilly Riot!
- John Hiatt & the Combo
- Angelique Kidjo
- Sublime with Rome
- Zappa Plays Zappa
- Slightly Stoopid
- Jonny Lang
- Seasick Steve
- Kenny Wayne Shepherd
- Keb' Mo'
- Candi Staton
- Nick Lowe
- Steve Earle
- Justin Townes Earle
- Yann Tiersen
- Josh Pyke
- Bettye LaVette
- Rosie Ledet
- Trombone Shorty & Orleans Avenue
- Weddings Parties Anything
- Great Big Sea
- Seth Lakeman
- Blue King Brown
- The Fabulous Thunderbirds featuring Kim Wilson
- David Bromberg Quartet
- Canned Heat
- Melbourne Ska Orchestra
- Alabama 3
- Dawes
- Vusi Mahlasela
- Backsliders
- Richard Clapton
- Blitzen Trapper
- The Audreys
- Eugene Bridges
- Ray Beadle
- James Vincent McMorrow
- Eilen Jewell
- 1814
- Joanne Shaw Taylor
- Hat Fitz & Cara
- Harry Manx
- Tribali
- Watussi
- Eagle and the Worm
- Mick Thomas' Roving Commission
- Mat McHugh (The Beautiful Girls)
- The Hands
- Mama Kin
- Tijuana Cartel
- Busby Marou
- Benjalu
- Bobby Alu
- Dan Hannaford
- Carus Thompson
- Daniel Champagne
- Dubmarine
- Kim Churchill
- Dallas Frasca
- Mason Rack Band
- Lachlan Bryan
- Marshall O'Kell
- Claude Hay
- Ashleigh Mannix
- Round Mountain Girls
- Ollie Brown
- Mojo Bluesman
- Kooii
- Harry Healy
- Blackbirds
- Mick McHugh
- Minnie Marks
- Young Sounds of Byron

=== 2013 ===
The line-up for the 2013 festival included:

Thursday, 28 March

- Ben Harper
- Trombone Shorty & Orleans Avenue
- Frank Turner and The Sleeping Souls
- Chris Isaak
- Rodriguez
- Tedeschi Trucks Band
- Joan Armatrading
- Fred Wesley and The New JBs
- The Duke Robillard Band
- Grace Potter
- Wanda Jackson
- The Snowdroppers
- Shawn Colvin
- William Elliot Whitmore
- Seth Lakeman
- The Beards

Friday, 29 March

- Santana
- Steve Miller Band
- Jimmy Cliff
- Blind Boys of Alabama
- Tedeschi Trucks Band
- Joan Armatrading
- Rodriguez
- Robert Cray
- Fred Wesley and The New JBs
- Trombone Shorty & Orleans Avenue
- Glen Hansard with The Frames
- Playing for Change
- The Snowdroppers
- Michael Kiwanuka
- Ruthie Foster
- The Haight Ashbury Show
- The Beards
- The Break
- Seth Lakeman
- William Elliot Whitmore
- Shawn Colvin
- Wards Xpress
- RocKwiz Live

Saturday 30, March

- Robert Plant
- Iggy and The Stooges
- Wilco
- Madness
- Grace Potter
- Dropkick Murphys
- Status Quo
- Robert Cray
- Blind Boys of Alabama
- Allen Toussaint
- Beasts of Bourbon
- Bettye LaVette
- Playing for Change
- The Beards
- Saskwatch
- Ruthie Foster
- Michael Kiwanuka
- Sweet Honey in the Rock
- Seth Lakeman
- Ben Caplan
- The Haight Ashbury Show
- Hat Fitz & Cara
- Round Mountain Girl
- Wards Zpress
- Lil Fi & The Rascals
- RocKwiz Live

Sunday, 31 March

- The Cat Empire
- Fat Freddy's Drop
- Madness
- Roger Hodgson
- Xavier Rudd
- Jon Anderson
- Mavis Staples
- Karise Eden
- Wanda Jackson
- Bettye LaVette
- Allen Toussaint
- Tony Joe White
- Melbourne Ska Orchestra
- The Bamboos
- Sweet Honey in the Rock
- Saskwatch
- Playing for Change
- Luka Bloom
- King Cannons
- Ben Caplan
- Mason Rack Band
- The Haight Ashbury Show
- RocKwiz Live

Monday, 1 April

- Paul Simon
- Wilco
- Rufus Wainwright
- Xavier Rudd
- Bonnie Raitt
- Melbourne Ska Orchestra
- Fat Freddy's Drop
- Mavis Staples
- The Bamboos
- Grey Ghost
- King Cannons
- Bettye LaVette
- Newton Faulkner
- Tony Joe White
- Busby Marou
- The Beards
- Haight Ashbury Show
- Ben Caplan
- Hat Fitz & Cara
- The Wilson Pickers

=== 2014 ===
The line-up for the 2014 festival included:

Thursday, 17 April

- John Mayer
- Edward Sharpe & the Magnetic Zeros
- Grace Potter and the Nocturnals
- Beth Hart
- Arakwal Opening Ceremony
- Zane Carney
- Buddy Guy
- Dr John & the Nite Trippers
- The Charlie Musselwhite Band
- The Black Sorrows
- Tijuana Cartel
- Seun Kuti & Egypt 80
- Public Opinion Afro Orchestra
- Playing For Change
- Steve Earle & the Dukes
- Dyson, Stringer and Cloher
- Allen Stone
- Coronet Blue
- Suzanne Vega
- Trixie Whitley
- Genevieve Chadwick
- Grandmothers of Invention
- The Magic Band
- The Soul Rebels
- Skunkhour
- Dubmarine
- Garland Jeffreys
- Glenn Cardier
- Marshall O'Kell and the Pride
- Seth Lakeman
- Shaun Kirk

Friday, 18 April

- Jack Johnson
- Matt Corby
- Gary Clark Jr
- India Arie
- Nahko and Medicine for the People
- Grace Potter and the Nocturnals
- Tijuana Cartel
- Doobie Brothers
- Boz Scaggs
- Buddy Guy
- Joss Stone
- Beth Hart
- Trixie Whitley
- Dyson, Stringer and Cloher
- Seun Kuti & Egypt 80
- Gregg Allman
- Aaron Neville
- Eric Bibb
- Steve Earle & the Dukes
- RocKwiz
- Clairy Browne & the Bangin' Rackettes
- Larry Graham & Graham Central Station
- The Wailers
- The Soul Rebels
- Public Opinion Afro Orchestra
- The Backsliders
- The Beards
- The Mastersons
- The Magic Band
- Grandmothers of Invention
- Allen Stone
- Dubmarine
- Coronet Blue
- Suzanne Vega
- Garland Jeffreys
- Seth Lakeman
- The Paladins
- Nikki Hill
- North Mississippi Allstars
- The Charlie Musselwhite Band
- ABC Coast FM National Broadcast
- Music Maker Foundation
- Hat Fitz & Cara
- Daniel Champagne

Saturday, 19 April

- Dave Matthews Band
- John Butler Trio
- Seun Kuti & Egypt 80
- Iron & Wine
- Devendra Banhart
- Kate Miller-Heidke
- Skunkhour
- Jeff Beck
- Gregg Allman
- Govt Mule
- Aaron Neville
- Jimmie Vaughan
- The James Cotton Blues Band
- Lime Cordiale
- Morcheeba
- Larry Graham & Graham Central Station
- Playing For Change
- The Black Sorrows
- The Soul Rebels
- RocKwiz
- WAR
- Ozomatli
- North Mississippi Allstars
- Robben Ford
- Devon Allman
- KT Tunstall
- Eugene "Hideaway" Bridges
- Hat Fitz & Cara
- Saskwatch
- Clairy Browne & the Bangin' Rackettes
- Grandmothers of Invention
- Nikki Hill
- The Beards
- Taste of Boomerang - Glenn Skuthorpe
- Chris Tamwoy, Troy Cassar Daley, Jannawi and ACPA Dancers
- Terrance Simien - Creole for Kids
- The Mojo Webb Band
- Music Maker Foundation
- The Backsliders
- The Paladins
- Eric Bibb
- Glenn Cardier
- Daniel Champagne
- Claire Anne Taylor

Sunday, 20 April

- Erykah Badu
- Morcheeba
- Iron & Wine
- Passenger
- Playing For Change
- Terrance Simien
- Foy Vance
- Kim Churchill
- Michael Franti & Spearhead
- Ozomatli
- Nahko and Medicine for the People
- Chali 2na
- WAR
- Cambodian Space Project
- CW Stoneking
- Hat Fitz & Cara
- Govt Mule
- Sly & Robbie and the Taxi Gang
- Mystery Performance - Watch This Space
- John Williamson
- Kasey Chambers
- RocKwiz
- Jimmie Vaughan
- Robben Ford
- The James Cotton Blues Band
- Booker T Jones
- Tim Rogers
- Valerie June
- Matthew Curry
- Music Maker Foundation
- The Magic Band
- Saidah Baba Talibah
- Watussi
- Taste of Boomerang - Glenn Skuthorpe
- Chris Tamwoy, Troy Cassar Daley, Jannawi and ACPA Dancers
- KT Tunstall
- The Beards
- Chain
- Eugene "Hideaway" Bridges
- Devon Allman
- Ray Beadle
- Joanne Shaw Taylor
- Candye Kane Band
- Nikki Hill
- Claude Hay

Monday, 21 April

- Dave Matthews Band
- Michael Franti & Spearhead
- Joss Stone
- India Arie
- Devendra Banhart
- Kim Churchill
- Elvis Costello & The Imposters
- Jake Bugg
- Foy Vance
- KC & The Sunshine Band
- WAR
- Shaun Kirk
- Gary Clark Jr
- Booker T Jones
- Sly & Robbie and the Taxi Gang
- Ozomatli
- Chali 2na
- Matthew Curry
- Lime Cordiale
- Watussi
- Saskwatch
- Jason Isbell
- Cambodian Space Project
- Terrance Simien
- Saidah Baba Talibah
- Round Mountain Girls
- 2014 Busking Winner
- Playing For Change
- The Beards
- Chain
- Music Maker Foundation
- Tim Rogers
- Candye Kane Band
- Byron Area High Schools Showcase
- Ray Beadle
- The Mojo Webb Band
- Joanne Shaw Taylor
- CW Stoneking
- Valerie June
- Claude Hay
- Phil Manning
- Genevieve Chadwick

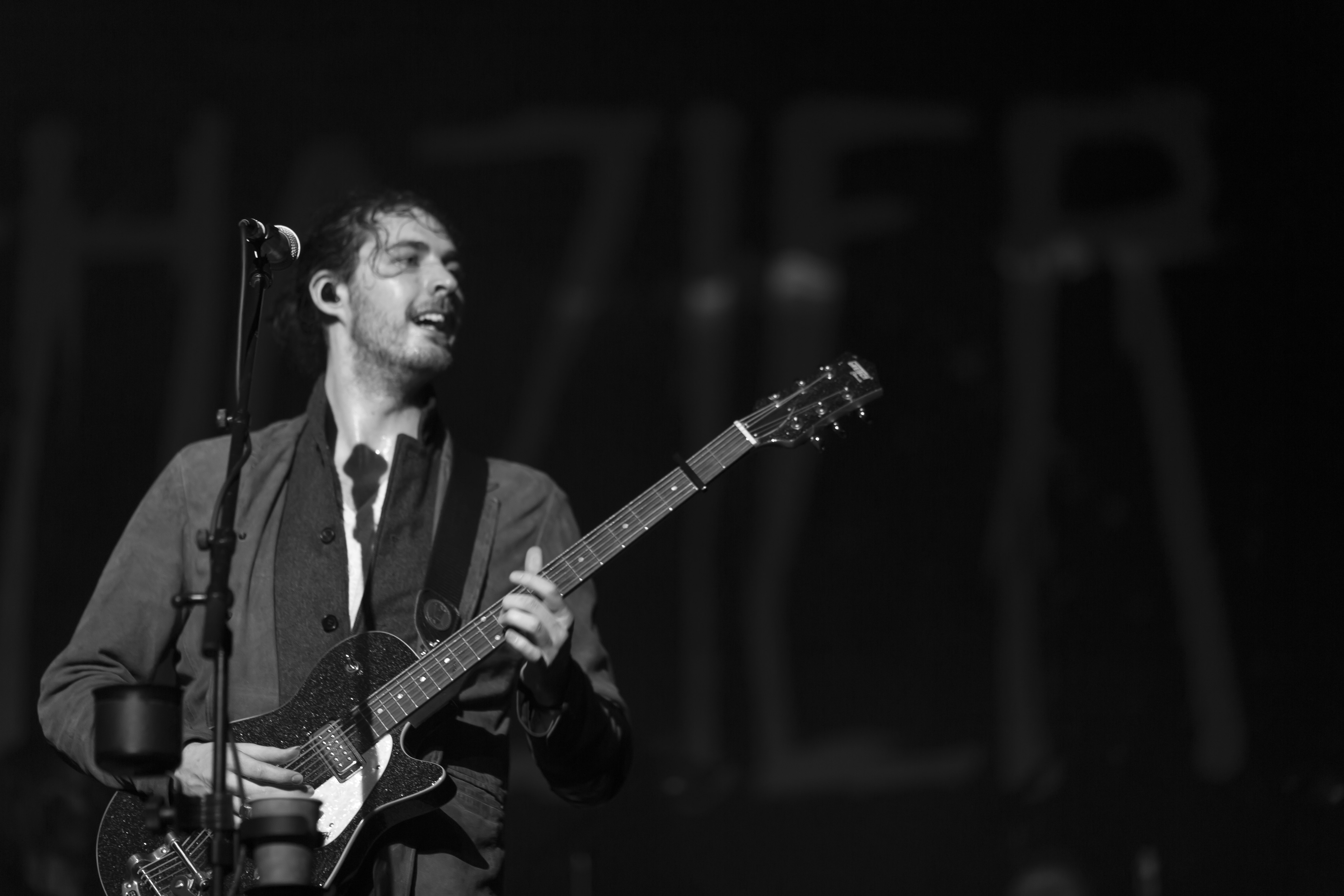
Hozier performing at Bluesfest in 2015

=== 2015 ===
The line-up for the 2015 festival included:

Thursday, 2 April

- Counting Crows
- Trombone Shorty & Orleans Avenue
- Sticky Fingers
- Jurassic 5
- Declan Kelly presents Diesel N' Dub feat. Frank Yamma, Emma Donovan, Radical Son, Pat Powell & Tony Hughes
- Frank Yamma
- Arakwal Opening Ceremony
- Angus & Julia Stone
- Hozier
- Boy & Bear
- Augie March
- Justin Townes Earle
- Skipping Girl Vinegar
- Jimmy Cliff
- SOJA
- Playing for Change
- Chris Robinson Brotherhood
- Wagons
- Luluc
- Nikki Hill
- Keb' Mo'
- G.Love & Special Sauce
- Matt Andersen
- Shaun Kirk
- Kristy Lee
- The Rumjacks
- Delta Rae
- Music Makers Blues Revue
- Dewayne Everettsmith
- The Bella Reunion

Friday, 3 April

- Alabama Shakes
- Paolo Nutini
- British India
- Trombone Shorty & Orleans Avenue
- Beth Hart
- Band Of Skulls
- Switchfoot
- Delta Rae
- Zac Brown Band
- Hunter Hayes
- Train
- Jimmy Cliff
- SOJA
- Keb' Mo'
- Nikki Hill
- Gary Clark Jr.
- Chris Robinson Brotherhood
- Ruthie Foster
- G. Love & Special Sauce
- JJ Grey & Mofro
- RocKwiz
- Dispatch
- Donavon Frankenreiter
- Playing for Change
- Declan Kelly presents Diesel N' Dub feat. Frank Yamma, Emma Donovan, Radical Son, Pat Powell & Tony Hughes
- The Beat
- Keziah Jones
- Jake Shimabukuro
- Kristy Lee
- Music Maker Blues Revue
- Jeff Lang
- Matt Andersen
- ABC Gold Coast FM National Broadcast
- Dewayne Everettsmith
- Frank Yamma
- Shaun Kirk

Saturday, 4 April

- Paolo Nutini
- Alabama Shakes
- Hozier
- Melbourne Ska Orchestra
- Mariachi El Bronx
- Skipping Girl Vinegar
- Band Of Skulls
- Genevieve Chadwick & The Stones Throw
- David Gray
- The Gipsy Kings
- Rodrigo y Gabriela
- The Waterboys
- John Mayall
- Nikki Hill
- Steve Smyth
- Playing for Change
- Fly My Pretties
- Dispatch
- Donavon Frankenreiter
- Keziah Jones
- RocKwiz
- Jon Cleary & The Monster Gentlemen
- Pokey LaFarge
- Dave Alvin & Phil Alvin with The Guilty Ones
- Jeff Lang
- Rebelution
- The Beat
- Kristy Lee
- Marlon Williams & The Yarra Benders
- Music Maker Blues Revue
- The Rumjacks
- Watussi
- Wagons
- Karl S. Williams
- Jake Shimabukuro
- Luluc

Sunday, 5 April

- Ben Harper & The Innocent Criminals
- Rodrigo y Gabriela
- Xavier Rudd & The United Nations
- Hunter Hayes
- Beth Hart
- The Beautiful Girls
- JJ Grey & Mofro
- Jurassic 5
- Frank Turner & The Sleeping Souls
- Melbourne Ska Orchestra
- Angelique Kidjo
- Gary Clark Jr.
- Ash Grunwald
- Declan Kelly presents Diesel N' Dub feat. Frank Yamma, Emma Donovan, Radical Son, Pat Powell & Tony Hughes
- Skipping Girl Vinegar
- Charles Bradley & His Extraordinaires
- Blue King Brown
- Fly My Pretties
- Mavis Staples
- Ruthie Foster
- RocKwiz
- The Rumjacks
- Jon Cleary & The Monster Gentlemen
- Nikki Hill
- Diesel
- Justin Townes Earle
- Phil Wiggins & Dom Turner
- Matt Andersen
- Steve Smyth
- Playing for Change
- Music Maker Blues Revenue
- Watussi
- Karl S. Williams
- James T.
- Serena Ryder
- Genevieve Chadwick & The Stones Throw
- Eddie Boyd & The Phatapillars (2014 Busking Comp Winner)

Monday, 6 April

- George Clinton & Parliament Funkadelic
- Paul Kelly presents Merri Soul Sessions feat. Dan Sultan, Kira Puru, Vika & Linda Bull, Clairy Browne
- Charles Bradley & His Extraordinaires
- Angelique Kidjo
- Watussi
- Nikki Hill
- Michael Franti & Spearhead
- SOJA
- Rebelution
- Michael Franti's Soulshine - Yoga & Acoustic Jam
- Mariachi El Bronx
- The Beautiful Girls
- Gary Clark Jr.
- Mavis Staples
- John Mayall
- Dave Alvin & Phil Alvin with The Guilty Ones
- Ash Grunwald
- Pokey LaFarge
- Karl S. Williams
- Playing for Change
- Blue King Brown
- Declan Kelly presents Diesel N' Dub feat. Frank Yamma, Emma Donovan, Radical Son, Pat Powell & Tony Hughes
- Tony Joe White
- Diesel
- Serena Ryder
- Steve Smyth
- 2015 Busking Competition Winner
- Music Maker Blues Revue
- Phil Wiggins & Dom Turner
- Matt Andersen
- James T.
- The Bella Reunion
- Eddie Boyd & The Phatapillars (2014 Busking Comp Winners)
- Marlon Williams & The Yarra Benders

=== 2016 ===
The line-up for the 2016 festival included:

Thursday, 24 March

- Kendrick Lamar
- D'Angelo
- Kamasi Washington
- Hiatus Kaiyote
- Fantastic Negrito
- Welcome to Country
- Tedeschi Trucks Band
- Cold War Kids
- Tweedy
- Con Brio
- Harts
- The Wailers present Exodus
- The Word
- Janiva Magness
- Lukas Nelson & Promise of the Real
- The Bros. Landreth
- Songhoy Blues
- Rhiannon Giddens
- Emma Donovan & The Putbacks
- Kaleo
- Lord Huron
- Digging Roots
- Lucky Peterson
- Eugene 'Hideaway' Bridges
- Chain
- Steve Smyth
- Jerron "Blind Boy" Paxton
- Marshall Okell

Friday, 25 March

- The National
- City and Colour
- Nahko and Medicine For The People
- Grace Potter
- Elle King
- Lord Huron
- Kaleo
- The Mick Fleetwood Blues Band featuring Rick Vito
- St. Paul & The Broken Bones
- Tweedy
- Graham Nash
- Archie Roach
- East Journey
- Arakwal Opening Ceremony
- The Wailers present Uprising
- Playing For Change Band
- Steve Earle & The Dukes
- Blackberry Smoke
- The Word
- Songhoy Blues
- Lukas Nelson & Promise of the Real
- Tex Perkins & The Ape
- Con Brio
- Rhiannon Giddens
- Shooglenifty
- The Bros. Landreth
- Frazey Ford
- Eugene 'Hideaway' Bridges
- Dustin Thomas
- Chain
- Lucky Peterson
- Jerron "Blind Boy" Paxton
- Brotherhood of the Blues
- ABC Gold Coast FM National Broadcast
- Mojo Juju
- Digging Roots
- Hussy Hicks

Saturday, 26 March

- D'Angelo
- Hiatus Kaiyote
- Kamasi Washington
- The Decemberists
- Eagles of Death Metal
- Con Brio
- Harts
- Joe Bonamassa
- Tedeschi Trucks Band
- The Mick Fleetwood Blues Band featuring Rick Vito
- Vintage Trouble
- St. Paul & The Broken Bones
- Allen Stone
- The Mastersons
- The Wailers present Survival
- Nahko and Medicine For The People
- Playing For Change Band
- Steve Earle & The Dukes
- Grace Potter
- Blackberry Smoke
- Janiva Magness
- Emma Donovan & The Putbacks
- The Word
- Lukas Nelson & Promise of the Real
- Elle King
- Mike Love
- Fantastic Negrito
- Kaleo
- The Bros. Landreth
- Irish Mythen
- Lucky Peterson
- Jeff Martin (The Tea Party)
- The Residents present Shadowland
- Frazey Ford
- Brotherhood of the Blues
- Pierce Brothers
- Steve Smyth
- Raw Earth

Sunday, 27 March

- Noel Gallagher's High Flying Birds
- The Decemberists
- The Cat Empire
- Modest Mouse
- Blackberry Smoke
- Houndmouth
- Jeff Martin (The Tea Party)
- UB40 featuring Ali Campbell, Astro and Mickey Virtue
- Melissa Etheridge
- Jackson Browne
- The Blind Boys of Alabama
- Graham Nash
- The Bros. Landreth
- Nathaniel Rateliff & The Night Sweats
- The Selecter
- The Wailers present Legend
- Taj Mahal
- Shakey Graves
- Ash Grunwald
- Kim Churchill
- Sahara Beck
- Allen Stone
- Janiva Magness
- Fantastic Negrito
- Lukas Nelson & Promise of the Real
- Shooglenifty
- The Word
- Con Brio
- Hussy Hicks
- Raw Earth
- The Residents present Shadowland
- Mojo Juju
- Mike Love
- Jerron "Blind Boy" Paxton
- Wards Xpress
- Dustin Thomas
- Grizzlee Train - 2015 Busking Competition Winner

Monday, 28 March

- Tom Jones
- Brian Wilson performing Pet Sounds
- The Blind Boys of Alabama
- Russell Morris
- Richard Clapton
- Kim Churchill
- The Original Blues Brothers Band
- Joe Bonamassa
- Vintage Trouble
- Playing For Change Band
- Taj Mahal
- Irish Mythen
- Ash Grunwald
- Pierce Brothers
- Jason Isbell
- Shakey Graves
- Nathaniel Rateliff & The Night Sweats
- St. Paul & The Broken Bones
- Allen Stone
- Lukas Nelson & Promise of the Real
- Marshall Okell
- Tenzin Choegyal
- Blackberry Smoke
- Fantastic Negrito
- Backsliders
- Mike Love
- Steve Smyth
- Wards Xpress
- 2016 Busking Competition Winner
- The Selecter
- Janiva Magness
- The Residents present Shadowland
- Kaleo
- Shooglenifty
- Jerron "Blind Boy" Paxton
- Sahara Beck
- Local Area High School Showcase

=== 2017 ===
The line-up for the 2017 festival included:

Thursday, 13 April

- Patti Smith and Her Band perform Horses
- Courtney Barnett
- Vintage Trouble
- The Strumbellas
- Andrew Bird
- Trevor Hall
- Welcome to Country
- Nas with guests The Soul Rebels
- Gallant
- Miles Electric Band
- Snarky Puppy
- Max Jury
- St. Paul & The Broken Bones
- Trombone Shorty & Orleans Avenue
- Corinne Bailey Rae
- Mavis Staples
- Rhiannon Giddens
- Davy Knowles
- The Mountain Goats
- Mud Morganfield
- Eric Gales
- Nikki Hill
- Irish Mythen
- Lucy Gallant
- Dumpstaphunk
- The California Honeydrops
- The Suffers
- Joan Osborne
- Melody Angel
- Devon Allman Band
- Jerron "Blind Boy" Paxton

Friday, 14 April

- Mary J Blige
- Snarky Puppy
- Trombone Shorty & Orleans Avenue
- Gallant
- Michael Kiwanuka
- Max Jury
- Arakwal Opening Ceremony
- The Lumineers
- Bonnie Raitt
- Jimmy Buffett
- Patti Smith acoustic set
- Mavis Staples
- Rhiannon Giddens
- The Mountain Goats
- Playing for Change
- Gregory Porter
- Rickie Lee Jones
- Roy Ayers
- Ellis Hall & Vasti Jackson
- Melody Angel
- Busby Marou
- Dumpstaphunk
- The Suffers
- The Soul Rebels
- Devon Allman Band
- The Strumbellas
- Joan Osborne
- Nikki Hill
- Jerron "Blind Boy" Paxton
- Mud Morganfield
- Eric Gales
- The California Honeydrops
- Davy Knowles
- Wouter Kellerman

BOOMERANG:

- Oka
- Jannawi Plus workshop
- Emily Wurramara
- Excelsior plus workshop
- Yirrmal
- Airileke and Rize Of the Morning Star
- Tenzin Choegyal

Saturday, 15 April

- The Doobie Brothers
- Sir Rosevelt
- Corinne Bailey Rae
- Gregory Porter
- Ellis Hall & Vasti Jackson
- Max Jury
- St. Paul & The Broken Bones
- Buddy Guy
- Beth Hart
- Vintage Trouble
- Billy Bragg
- Nikki Hill
- Slightly Stoopid
- Nahko & Medicine for the People
- The Record Company
- Irish Mythen
- Jake Shimabukuro
- The Australian Ukulele Show
- The Wilson Pickers
- Little Georgia
- Devon Allman Band
- Roy Ayers
- Laura Mvula
- Turin Brakes
- Rickie Lee Jones
- Trevor Hall
- Ray Beadle & The Silver Dollars
- Jeff Lang
- The California Honeydrops
- Davy Knowles
- Jerron "Blind Boy" Paxton
- Joan Osborne
- Melody Angel

BOOMERANG:

- Emily Wurramara
- Jannawi plus workshop
- Leonard Sumner
- Excelsior Plus workshop
- Yirrmal
- Jannawi plus workshop

Sunday, 16 April

- Madness
- Michael Kiwanuka
- Slightly Stoopid
- Playing for Change
- Nic Cester and The Milano Elettica
- Jake Shimabukuro
- Irish Mythen
- Zac Brown Band
- Santana
- Buddy Guy
- Jethro Tull
- The Record Company
- Round Mountain Girls
- Booker T. presents The Stax Revue
- Mavis Staples
- Laura Mvula
- Remi
- The Suffers
- Rhiannon Giddens
- Davy Knowles
- Lloyd Spiegel
- Experience Jimi Hendrix
- Nikki Hill
- Eric Gales
- Turin Brakes
- Devon Allman Band
- Mud Morganfield
- Glenn Cardier and the Sideshow
- Ivy 2016 Busking Competition Winner
- Dumpstaphunk
- The California Honeydrops
- Australian Ukulele Show
- Max Jury
- Wouter Kellerman

BOOMERANG:

- Leonard Sumner
- Excelsior Plus workshop
- Tenzin Choegyal
- Jannawi plus workshop
- Airileke and Rize of the Morning Star
- Excelsior Plus workshop
- Oka

Monday, 17 April

- Zac Brown Band
- Beth Hart
- St. Paul & The Broken Bones
- Miles Electric Band
- The Suffers
- Neil Finn
- Kasey Chambers
- Busby Marou
- Playing for Change
- Nic Cester and The Milano Elettica
- Laura Mvula
- Dumpstaphunk
- Mavis Staples
- Booker T presents The Stax Revue
- Billy Bragg & Joe Henry
- Tony Joe White
- Glenn Cardier and the Sideshow
- Nahko & Medicine for the People
- The Record Company
- Remi
- Jeff Lang
- Lloyd Spiegel
- Ray Beadle & The Silver Dollars
- Jerron "Blind Boy" Paxton
- 2017 Busking Competition Winner
- The California Honeydrops
- Devon Allman Band
- Melody Angel
- Little Georgia
- Lucy Gallant
- The Wilson Pickers
- Round Mountain Girls
- Local Area High School Showcase

=== 2018 ===
The line-up for the 2018 festival included:

Thursday, 29 March

- Tash Sultana
- Leon Bridges
- Gomez
- Rag 'n' Bone Man
- Holy Holy
- Arakwal Welcome to Country & Opening Ceremony
- The Original Blues Brothers Band
- Jason Isbell and The 400 Unit
- Gov't Mule
- Lukas Nelson & Promise of the Real
- Citizen Cope
- The Wailers
- The New Power Generation
- Hurray for the Riff Raff
- All Our Exes Live in Texas
- Elephant Sessions
- Steve Smyth
- Joe Louis Walker
- Newton Faulkner
- Ryan McMullan
- Shaun Kirk
- Busking 2018 Finalists
- Dumpstaphunk
- William Crighton
- The California Honeydrops
- Caiti Baker
- Bali Blues Brothers

Friday, 30 March

- Ms. Lauryn Hill
- The New Power Generation
- Gomez
- Asgeir
- Harts
- Clarence Bekker Band
- Robert Plant & The Sensational Space Shifters
- Jimmy Cliff
- Youssou N’Dour
- Juanes
- All Our Exes Live In Texas
- Little Georgia
- The Wailers
- Gov't Mule
- Dumpstaphunk
- Con Brio
- Hanlon Brothers
- The Teskey Brothers
- Citizen Cope
- Eric Gales
- Bobby Rush
- Canned Heat
- Newton Faulkner
- Hurray for the Riff Raff
- André Cymone
- Tay Oskee 2017 Busking Competition Winner
- Molly Millington 2017 Busking Grommet Winner
- The California Honeydrops
- Joe Louis Walker
- Elephant Sessions
- Double J Live Broadcast

BOOMERANG:

- Narasirato
- The Strides
- Sorong Samarai
- Meet the Artists
- Healing Workshops
- Weaving workshops
- Art Gallery Talks
- Healing
- Kids weaving
- Weaving with Grasses
- Talks and Ideas
- Move it Mob Style with Darren Compton
- Workshops Jannawi
- Eric Avery
- Muggerah

Saturday, 31 March

- Michael Franti & Spearhead
- The New Power Generation
- Juanes
- Seu Jorge
- Ryan McMullan
- Little Georgia
- The Original Blues Brothers Band -
- Jackson Browne
- Jason Isbell and The 400 Unit
- Leon Bridges
- The Wailers
- Clarence Bekker Band
- Lukas Nelson & Promise of the Real
- Dumpstaphunk
- Harts
- Con Brio
- Harry Manx
- Mia Dyson
- Steve Smyth
- Hussy Hicks
- Afro Celt Sound System
- Canned Heat
- Chain
- André Cymone
- The California Honeydrops
- Citizen Cope
- Busking 2018 Finalists
- Rick Estrin & The Nightcats
- Caiti Baker
- William Crighton
- Shaun Kirk

BOOMERANG:

- Sorong Samarai
- Yirrmal
- Benny Walker
- Narasirato
- Meet the Artists
- Healing Workshops
- Weaving workshops
- Art Gallery Talks
- Healing
- Kids Weaving
- Weaving with Grasses
- Talks and Ideas
- Narasirato
- Eric Avery
- Move it Mob Style
- Jannawi
- Workshops Muggerah

Sunday, 1 April

- John Butler Trio
- Tash Sultana
- Ziggy Alberts
- First Aid Kit
- José González
- The California Honeydrops
- Sheryl Crow
- Melissa Etheridge
- Seal
- Seu Jorge
- Mia Dyson
- Clayton Doley's Bayou Billabong
- Morcheeba
- Rag 'n' Bone Man
- Lukas Nelson & Promise of the Real
- Eric Gales
- Walter Trout
- Afro Celt Sound System
- Dog Trumpet
- Ryan McMullan
- The Wailers
- Dumpstaphunk
- Benjamin Booker
- Hanlon Brothers
- The Teskey Brothers
- Steve Smyth
- William Crighton
- 2018 Busking Competition Winner
- Bobby Rush
- Caiti Baker
- Clarence Bekker Band
- Hussy Hicks

BOOMERANG:

- Yirrmal
- Benny Walker
- The Strides
- Meet the Artists
- Healing Workshops
- Weaving workshops
- Art Gallery Talks
- Healing
- Kids weaving
- Weaving with Grasses
- Talks and Ideas
- Gathering Ceremony with local dancers
- Sarong Samarai
- Eric Avery
- Move it Mob Style with Darren Compton

Monday, 2 April

- Lionel Richie
- Chic featuring Nile Rodgers
- Dan Sultan
- Benny Walker
- Miss Renee Simone
- Michael Franti & Spearhead
- Jimmy Cliff
- The Wailers
- Con Brio
- Hayley Grace & The Bay Collective
- Morcheeba
- Lukas Nelson & Promise of the Real
- Benjamin Booker
- Walter Trout
- Mia Dyson
- Shaun Kirk
- Clayton Doley's Bayou Billabong
- Rick Estrin & The Nightcats
- Eric Gales
- Chain
- Citizen Cope
- Harry Manx
- Steve Smyth
- Caiti Baker
- 2018 Busking Grommet Competition Winner
- The California Honeydrops
- Dumpstaphunk
- Clarence Bekker Band
- Dog Trumpet
- William Crighton
- Ryan McMullan
- Bali Blues Brothers
- Local Area High School Showcase

=== 2019 ===
The line-up for 2019 included:

Thursday, 18 April

- Mavis Staples
- Snarky Puppy
- Six60
- Kurt Vile and The Violators
- Ocean Alley
- Arlo Guthrie
- Nahko and Medicine for the People
- Ruthie Foster
- Richard Clapton
- Russell Morris
- The Marcus King Band
- Fantastic Negrito
- Samantha Fish
- The War and Treaty
- The Black Sorrows
- Irish Mythen
- Melody Angel
- The California Honeydrops
- Elephant Sessions
- Caiti Baker
- Baker Boy
- Dallas Woods

Friday, 19 April

- Iggy Pop
- Hozier
- Norah Jones
- Tash Sultana
- Gary Clark Jr.
- Snarky Puppy
- Imelda May
- St. Paul and the Broken Bones
- Shakey Graves
- Arlo Guthrie
- Nahko and Medicine for the People
- I'm with Her
- Ruthie Foster
- Flogging Molly
- Backsliders
- The Marcus King Band
- Samantha Fish
- Deva Mahal
- Pierce Brothers
- Trevor Hall
- Irish Mythen
- Anderson East
- Melody Angel
- Hussy Hicks
- Caiti Baker

BOOMERANG:

- Baker Boy
- Dallas Woods
- DOBBY
- Brotherhood of the Blues

Saturday, 20 April

- Ben Harper
- Kasey Chambers
- Mavis Staples
- Tommy Emmanuel
- Colin Hay
- Imelda May
- Kurt Vile and The Violators
- Keb' Mo'
- Allen Stone
- St. Paul and the Broken Bones
- Lukas Nelson & Promise of the Real
- Melbourne Ska Orchestra
- I'm with Her
- Flogging Molly
- Fantastic Negrito
- Samantha Fish
- The War and Treaty
- Larkin Poe
- Yothu Yindi and The Treaty Project
- Vintage Trouble
- Melody Angel
- The California Honeydrops
- Elephant Sessions
- Caiti Baker
- Little Georgia
- Dallas Woods
- Amaru Tribe
- RocKwiz Live

BOOMERANG:

- Archie Roach
- Mojo Juju
- Benny Walker
- DOBBY

Sunday, 21 April

- Jack Johnson
- Nathaniel Rateliff & The Night Sweats
- Mavis Staples
- Gary Clark Jr.
- George Clinton & Parliament-Funkadelic
- Meshell Ndegeocello
- Lukas Nelson & Promise of the Real
- Melbourne Ska Orchestra
- Archie Roach
- Shakey Graves
- Ruthie Foster
- Tex Perkins and The Fat Rubber Band
- Backsliders
- The Marcus King Band
- Fantastic Negrito
- The War and Treaty
- Deva Mahal
- Larkin Poe
- Pierce Brothers
- Trevor Hall
- Anderson East
- Melody Angel
- Thando Sikwila
- The California Honeydrops
- Little Georgia
- RocKwiz Live

BOOMERANG:

- Yothu Yindi and The Treaty Project
- Mission Songs Project
- Benny Walker

Monday, 22 April

- Paul Kelly
- The Saboteurs
- David Gray
- Ray LaMontagne
- Julia Stone
- Nathaniel Rateliff & The Night Sweats
- George Clinton & Parliament-Funkadelic
- Keb' Mo'
- Allen Stone
- St. Paul and the Broken Bones
- Lukas Nelson & Promise of the Real
- Archie Roach
- I'm with Her
- Samantha Fish
- Deva Mahal
- Vintage Trouble
- Mojo Juju
- Anderson East
- Melody Angel
- Hussy Hicks
- Thando
- The California Honeydrops
- Elephant Sessions
- Caiti Baker
- Mission Songs Project
- Benny Walker
- Amaru Tribe
- Brotherhood of the Blues

=== 2020 ===
Bluesfest 2020 was cancelled on 16 March 2020 due to the Public Health COVID-19 Public Events Order 2020.

The line-up for 2020 was set to include:

Thursday, 9 April

- The Cat Empire
- Frank Turner
- Zucchero
- The Sensations
- Ash Grunwald
- Trombone Shorty & Orleans Avenue
- LP
- The Bamboos
- The Regime
- Tal Wilkenfeld
- Jimmie Vaughan
- Greensky Bluegrass
- Steve 'n' Seagulls
- The War & Treaty
- Yola
- Hussy Hicks
- The Allman Betts Band
- Christone "Kingfish" Ingram
- Amadou & Mariam
- Micki Free
- Erja Lyytinen
- MY BABY
- Pacey, King & Doley
- Here Come the Mummies
- Round Mountain Girls
- Roshani
- LamBros.

Friday, 10 April

- Lenny Kravitz
- Dweezil Zappa
- Cory Henry & the Funk Apostles
- LP
- The Bamboos
- The Sensations
- Alanis Morissette
- Brandi Carlile
- Buffy Sainte-Marie
- Yola
- The Waifs
- The War and Treaty
- Morcheeba
- The Marcus King Band
- Zucchero
- Steve 'n' Seagulls
- Amadou & Mariam
- The Regime
- Jimmie Vaughan
- The Allman Betts Band
- Greensky Bluegrass
- Christone "Kingfish" Ingram
- Ash Grunwald
- Morgane Ji
- MY BABY
- Here Come the Mummies
- Erja Lyytinen
- Tal Wilkenfeld

Saturday, 11 April

- Kool and the Gang
- George Benson
- The Gipsy Kings
- Zucchero
- Dirty Honey
- Harts Plays Hendrix
- Patti Smith and Her Band
- Ani DiFranco
- Allen Stone
- Troy Cassar-Daley
- Larkin Poe
- Australian Americana Music Honours
- Eagles of Death Metal
- Morcheeba
- Cory Henry & the Funk Apostles
- Amadou & Mariam
- Tal Wilkenfield
- Joachim Cooder
- Hussy Hicks
- MY BABY
- Walter Trout
- Chain
- Pacey, King & Doley
- Micki Free
- Erja Lyytinen
- Steve 'n' Seagulls
- Here Come the Mummies
- The War & Treaty
- The Allman Betts Band
- Morgane Ji
- ABC Broadcast
- Roshani
- Emily Wurramara
- LamBros.

Sunday, 12 April

- The Wailers
- Allen Stone
- Guy Sebastian
- Tori Kelly
- Dami Im
- Yola
- Little Georgia
- Crowded House
- Xavier Rudd
- John Butler
- Ani DiFranco
- The Waifs
- Henry Wagons
- Jimmie Vaughan
- The Marcus King Band
- The Waterboys
- Buffy Sainte-Marie
- Daniel Champagne
- Joachim Cooder
- The Allman Betts Band
- The Sensations
- John Mayall
- Greensky Bluegrass
- Steve 'n' Seagulls
- Troy Cassar-Daley (Trio)
- Dirty Honey
- Roshani
- Electrik Lemonade
- Christone "Kingfish" Ingram
- The War & Treaty
- Ray Beadle (acoustic)
- Morgane Ji
- Emily Wurramara
- Nathan Cavaleri
- Hussy Hicks

Monday, 13 April

- Patti Smith and Her Band
- Tori Kelly
- Larkin Poe
- The War & Treaty
- Hussy Hicks
- Dave Matthews Band
- Christone "Kingfish" Ingram
- The Waterboys
- The Sensations
- Round Mountain Girls
- Cory Henry & the Funk Apostles
- John Mayall
- Walter Trout
- Micki Free
- Harts Plays Hendrix
- The Allman Betts Band
- Here Come the Mummies
- Chain
- Tal Wilkenfield
- Joachim Cooder
- Henry Wagons
- Nathan Cavaleri
- Palm Valley
- Pacey, King & Doley
- Ray Beadle (acoustic)
- The Regime
- Daniel Champagne
- Little Georgia
- Local Area High School Showcase

=== 2021 ===
Bluesfest 2021 was cancelled on 31 March 2021 by order of the Minister for Health and Medical Research, due to the discovery of a positive COVID-19 case in Byron Bay the previous day.

The line-up for 2021 was set to include:

Thursday, 1 April

- Welcome to Country
- Bluesfest Busking 2021 Finalists
- Fiona Boyes
- JK-47
- Lambros.
- Ash Grunwald
- Garrett Kato
- Roshani
- Backsliders
- Kim Churchill
- Hussy Hicks
- The Black Sorrows
- The Bamboos
- Pacey, King & Doley
- Ross Wilson and the Peaceniks
- Hiatus Kaiyote
- The Regime
- Melbourne Ska Orchestra
- The Cat Empire

Friday, 2 April

- Bluesfest Busking 2021 Finalists
- Roshani
- Nathan Cavaleri
- All Our Exes Live in Texas
- The Buckleys
- Lambros
- Kate Miller-Heidke
- Pierce Brothers
- The Regime
- Vika and Linda
- Kim Churchill
- Fiona Boyes & The Fortune Tellers
- The Waifs
- Harts Plays Hendrix
- The Bamboos
- The Church
- Ash Grunwald
- Russell Morris
- The Angels
- Briggs
- The Black Sorrows
- The Living End
- Ocean Alley

Saturday, 3 April

- Bluesfest Busking 2021 Finalists
- Declan Kelly
- Electrik Lemonade (2019 Busking Competition Winner)
- Lambros.
- Roshani
- Hussy Hicks
- Nathan Cavaleri
- All Our Exes Live in Texas
- Kara Grainger
- Jeff Lang
- Mama Kin Spender
- Harts Plays Hendrix
- Pacey, King & Doley
- Troy Cassar-Daley
- Ziggy Alberts
- Backsliders
- Kev Carmody
- Tash Sultana
- Chain
- Hiatus Kaiyote
- Melbourne Ska Orchestra (with special guests)

Sunday, 4 April

- Little Georgia
- Round Mountain Girls
- Garrett Kato
- Henry Wagons
- Pierce Brothers
- Emily Wurramara
- Daniel Champagne
- The Waifs
- Mama Kin Spender
- Ray Beadle
- Weddings Parties Anything
- Dami Im
- Troy Cassar-Daley
- Xavier Rudd
- Jon Stevens
- Nathan Cavaleri
- John Butler
- Ian Moss
- Hussy Hicks
- Jeff Lang
- The Teskey Brothers
- Jimmy Barnes

Monday, 5 April

- Palm Valley
- Hussy Hicks
- Emily Wurramara
- Roshani
- Daniel Champagne
- Mick Thomas' Roving Commission
- Little Georgia
- Henry Wagons
- Round Mountain Girls
- Tex Perkins The Man in Black
- Kara Grainger
- Ash Grunwald & Josh Teskey
- Kate Ceberano
- Ray Beadle
- Kasey Chambers
- Mark Seymour & The Undertow
- Pacey, King & Doley
- John Williamson
- Chain
- The Regime
- Pete Murray

Bluesfest 2021 was rescheduled to 1–4 October 2021. The revised line-up for 2021 was set to include:

Friday, 1 October

- Midnight Oil
- Ocean Alley
- Xavier Rudd
- The Church
- The Living End
- Russell Morris
- Briggs
- Tex Perkins The Man in Black
- The Black Sorrows
- Ash Grunwald
- Vika and Linda
- Nathan Cavaleri
- Kim Churchill
- JK-47
- Garrett Kato
- Fiona Boyes & The Fortune Tellers
- All Our Exes Live in Texas
- Roshani
- Lambros.
- The Regime
- Bluesfest Busking Competition & Winners
- Welcome to Country

Saturday, 2 October

- Paul Kelly
- Tash Sultana
- Ziggy Alberts
- Kasey Chambers
- The Angels
- Ross Wilson and the Peaceniks
- Kate Miller-Heidke
- The Black Sorrows
- Chain
- Ash Grunwald
- Melbourne Ska Orchestra
- Jeff Lang
- Nathan Cavaleri
- Mama Kin Spender
- Pierce Brothers
- Fiona Boyes & The Fortune Tellers
- Pacey, King & Doley
- All Our Exes Live in Texas
- Hussy Hicks
- Roshani
- Lambros.
- Electrik Lemonade
- Bluesfest Busking Competition & Winners

Sunday, 3 October

- Jimmy Barnes
- John Butler
- The Cat Empire
- The Waifs
- Jon Stevens
- Ian Moss
- Troy Cassar-Daley
- Hiatus Kaiyote
- Weddings Parties Anything
- The Bamboos
- Backsliders
- Jeff Lang
- Nathan Cavaleri
- Kim Churchill
- Henry Wagons
- Garrett Kato
- Mama Kin Spender
- Dami Im
- Pierce Brothers
- Emily Wurramara
- Ray Beadle
- Hussy Hicks
- Daniel Champagne
- Little Georgia
- Round Mountain Girls
- Bluesfest Busking Competition & Winners

Monday, 4 October

- Pete Murray
- Mark Seymour & The Undertow
- Kate Ceberano
- The Waifs
- Troy Cassar-Daley
- Hiatus Kaiyote
- The Bamboos
- Chain
- Melbourne Ska Orchestra
- Mick Thomas' Roving Commission
- Henry Wagons
- Emily Wurramara
- The Buckleys
- Ray Beadle
- Pacey, King & Doley
- Hussy Hicks
- Roshani
- Daniel Champagne
- Little Georgia
- Round Mountain Girls
- The Regime
- Palm Valley
- Bluesfest Busking Competition & Winners

On 17 August 2021, Bluesfest 2021 was once again cancelled due to COVID-19, and will not be rescheduled. The majority of the announced lineup has been confirmed for Bluesfest 2022, which took place over its original Easter weekend scheduling.

=== 2022 ===
- Midnight Oil
- Paul Kelly
- Crowded House
- Jimmy Barnes
- Amy Shark
- The Cat Empire
- George Benson (USA)
- The Teskey Brothers
- Six60 (NZ)
- L.A.B. (NZ)
- Fat Freddy's Drop (NZ)
- John Butler
- Xavier Rudd
- Missy Higgins
- Kasey Chambers
- Hoodoo Gurus
- Ian Moss
- The Living End
- Pete Murray
- The Wailers (JAM)
- Morcheeba (UK)
- The Waifs
- Jon Stevens
- Kate Ceberano
- John Williamson
- Ross Wilson and The Peaceniks
- The Angels
- The Church
- Kev Carmody & Friends
- Renee Geyer
- Glenn Shorrock
- Tex Perkins The Man In Black
- Vika & Linda
- Stan Walker
- Briggs
- Troy Cassar-Daley
- Baker Boy
- Hiatus Kaiyote
- Weddings Parties Anything
- The Black Sorrows
- Kate Miller-Heidke
- Casey Barnes
- Mark Seymour & The Undertow
- Diesel
- Amadou & Mariam (MLI)
- The War and Treaty (USA)
- Christone "Kingfish" Ingram (USA)
- Cory Henry (USA)
- Russell Morris
- Kevin Borich Express
- C.W. Stoneking
- Josh Teskey & Ash Grunwald
- Joe Camilleri
- Chain
- Tamam Shud
- Spectrum
- Lachy Doley & The Horns of Conviction
- Caravãna Sun
- Melbourne Ska Orchestra
- The Bamboos
- Backsliders
- Ash Grunwald
- All Our Exes Live in Texas
- Sam Teskey
- 19-Twenty
- Henry Wagons
- Clarence Bekker (NLD)
- Jeff Lang
- Fiona Boyes & The Fortune Tellers
- Kara Grainger
- Blue Empress All-Stars
- Spinifex Gum ft Marliya Choir & Emma Donovan
- Jeff Martin Plays the Songs of Led Zeppelin (CAN)
- Tijuana Cartel
- Ray Beadle
- Pacey, King, & Doley
- Nathan Cavaleri
- Kim Churchill
- Fools
- Mama Kin Spender
- Dami Im
- Pierce Brothers
- Emily Wurramara
- The Buckleys
- Mick Thomas' Roving Comission
- Lisa Hunt's Forever Soul
- Geoff Achison & The Soul Diggers
- Daniel Champagne
- JK-47
- The Regime
- Hat Fitz & Cara
- Garrett Kato
- Hussy Hicks
- Minnie Marks
- Roshani
- Little Georgia
- Round Mountain Girls
- Juzzie Smith
- Electric Lemonade
- Lambros.
- Palm Valley
- Bronte Eve
- Ben Swissa
- Byron Busking Competition

=== 2023 ===
The 2023 Byron Bay Bluesfest ran from the 6th to the 10th of April and the line-up included the following artists.

- Gang of Youths
- Paolo Nutini (UK)
- Tash Sultana
- Bonnie Raitt (USA)
- The Doobie Brothers (USA)
- Buddy Guy (USA)
- Joe Bonamassa (USA) Exclusive
- Jackson Browne (USA)
- Elvis Costello & The Imposters (UK)
- Jason Isbell and The 400 Unit (USA)
- Lucinda Williams (USA)
- Counting Crows (USA)
- Beck (USA)
- Mavis Staples (USA)
- A Heartfelt Tribute To Archie Roach
- Nathaniel Rateliff & The Nightsweats (USA)
- Michael Franti & Spearhead (USA)
- Jon Stevens
- Trombone Shorty & Orleans Avenue (USA)
- LP (USA)
- The Cat Empire
- Xavier Rudd
- Kaleo (ICE)
- Yirrmal
- Beth Hart (USA) Exclusive
- Marcus King (USA)
- Eric Gales (USA)
- Steve Earle (USA)
- St. Paul & The Broken Bones (USA)
- Lisa Hunt's Forever Soul
- Larkin Poe (USA)
- Keb' Mo' (USA)
- Allison Russell (CAN)
- Frank Turner (UK)
- Chain
- The Black Sorrows
- The Angels
- Spinifex Gum
- Femi Kuti & The Positive Force (NGA)
- Dami Im
- Christone "Kingfish" Ingram (USA)
- Vintage Trouble (USA)
- Backsliders
- Ray Beadle Stax of Blues
- Ash Grunwald
- Clarence Bekker Band (NLD)
- Eric Stang (USA)
- The Bros. Landreth (CAN)
- Steve 'n' Seagulls (FIN)
- Greensky Bluegrass (USA)
- Eugene "Hideaway" Bridges (USA)
- Lachy Doley and The Horns of Conviction
- Fools
- Southern Avenue (USA)
- Steve Poltz (CAN/USA)
- Nikki Hill (USA) Exclusive
- Coterie
- Dog Trumpet
- Frank Sultana
- 19-Twenty
- Daniel Champagne
- Round Mountain Girls
- Bobby Alu
- Hussy Hicks
- Joe Camilleri
- Roshani
- Electric Cadillac (IDN)
- Jerome Williams
- Bud Rokesky
- Buttered
- Loose Content
- RocKwiz Live

=== 2024 ===
The 2024 Byron Bay Bluesfest ran from the 28th of March to the 1st of April

- Jack Johnson (USA) Exclusive
- Tom Jones (UK)
- Jimmy Barnes
- Ben Harper & The Innocent Criminals (USA) Exclusive
- The Teskey Brothers
- Matt Corby
- Tedeschi Trucks Band (USA)
- Portugal. The Man (USA) Exclusive
- L.A.B. (NZ)
- Ziggy Alberts
- The Cruel Sea
- Elvis Costello & the Imposters (UK)
- The Dead South (CAN)
- Peter Garret & the Alter-Egos
- Tim Finn (NZ)
- Taj Mahal (USA) Exclusive
- Tommy Emmanuel Exclusive
- Snarky Puppy (USA)
- Infectious Grooves Ft. Robert Trujillo, Mike Muir, Jay Weinberg, Dave Kushner, & Dean Pleasants (USA)
- Rickie Lee Jones (USA)
- PJ Morton (USA)
- Blind Boys of Alabama (USA)
- Katie Melua (UK)
- Ian Moss
- Drive-by Truckers (USA)
- Meshell Ndegeocello (USA)
- Brad Cox
- The Paper Kites
- The Waifs
- Allman Betts Band Family Revival Ft. Devon Allman, Duane Betts, Larry McCray, & Ally Venable (USA)
- The Whitlams Black Stump
- Dan Sultan
- Coterie
- Playing For Change (INT)
- Newton Faulkner (UK)
- Taj Farrant
- Lisa Hunt Forever Soul
- Yirrmal
- Dirty Honey (USA)
- 19-Twenty
- Fiona Boyes & the Fortune Tellers
- The Turner Brown Band
- Harry Manx (CAN)
- Erja Lyytinen (FIN) Exclusive
- Jackie Venson (USA) Exclusive
- Pierce Brothers
- Clayton Doley Bayou Billabong
- Here Come the Mummies (USA) Exclusive
- Steve Poltz (CAN/USA)
- Caravana Sun
- WILSN
- Little Quirks
- eMDee
- Velvet Trip
- Hussy Hicks
- Jerome Williams
- Ben Swissa
- Blues Arcadia
- Women of Soul Collective
- Roshani
- Sweet Talk
- Perry Street Park
- Da Manager
- RockWiz Live!

=== 2025 ===
The 2025 Byron Bay Bluesfest ran from the 17th of April to the 20th of April

- Crowded House
- Chaka Khan (USA)
- Toto (USA)
- Hilltop Hoods
- Missy Higgins
- Vance Joy
- Ocean Alley
- Tones and I
- George Thorogood & The Destroyers (USA)
- Gary Clark Jr (USA)
- Tom Morello (USA)
- Christopher Cross (USA)
- Maoli (USA)
- Rag'n'Bone Man (UK)
- Xavier Rudd
- Ry X
- John Butler
- The Cat Empire
- Kasey Chambers
- Rodrigo Y Gabriela (MEX)
- Christone "Kingfish" Ingram (USA)
- Brad Cox
- Fanny Lumsden
- Melbourne Ska Orchestra
- Taj Farrant Exclusive
- Here Come the Mummies (USA) Exclusive
- Budjerah
- C.W. Stoneking
- Lachy Doley Group
- Allison Russell (CAN)
- Nahko (USA)
- The California Honeydrops (USA) Exclusive
- Marc Broussard (USA)
- Pierce Brothers
- Ash Grunwald
- Kim Churchill
- 19-Twenty
- WILSN
- Cimafunk (CUB) Exclusive
- Neal Francis (USA) Exclusive
- BJ The Chicago Kid (USA)
- Clarence Bekker Band (NLD)
- Hussy Hicks
- Roshani
- Miss Kaninna
- The Beards Exclusive
- Melody Angel (USA) Exclusive
- Velvet Trip
- Don West
- Fools
- Sweet Talk
- Eric Stang (USA)
- Electric Cadillac (IDN)
- The Memphis Three ft. Fiona Boyes, Jimi Hocking & Frank Sultana
- The Steele Syndicate
- The Royals

=== Scheduled 2026 line-up ===
The following artists were scheduled to perform at the 2026 festival before its cancellation:

- Split Enz (NZ)
- Parkway Drive
- Earth, Wind & Fire (USA)
- Sublime (USA)
- Erykah Badu (USA)
- Buddy Guy (USA)
- The Black Crowes (USA)
- Counting Crows (USA)
- The Pogues (UK)
- Marcus King (USA)
- Xavier Rudd
- The Living End
- The Wailers (JAM)
- Jerry Harrison & Adrian Belew Remain In Light (USA)
- Backsliders (With Special Guests) 'A Tribute to Rob Hirst'
- Kenny Wayne Shepherd (USA)
- Robert Randolph (USA)
- Mental As Anything
- Mark Seymour
- Troy Cassar-Daley
- Skeggs
- The Dreggs
- South Summit
- Chain
- Backsliders
- Pierce Brothers
- Hussy Hicks
- Ray Beadle
- Taj Farrant
- 19-Twenty
- The Southern River Band
- Áine Tyrrell
- Steve Poltz (CAN/USA)
- Kyle Brew
- Daniel Champagne
- Nik West (USA) Exclusive
- Roshani
- Angelique Francis (CAN) Exclusive
- Jovin Webb (USA) Exclusive
- Z-Star (UK)
- Zevon Lee with Clarence Bekker (NLD)
- Ben Catley
- Laid Back Country Picker (USA) Exclusive
- Birren
- Torin Peat
- Bluesfest Busking Competition
- Sydney Blues Society Challenge Winners ft. Jack & the Axes, Shane Flew & Matt Ross
- Future of the Blues - Youth Showcase
- Local Area High School Showcase
- Australian American Music Honours Performance

== See also ==
- List of festivals in Australia
- List of reggae festivals
- List of blues festivals
- West Coast Blues & Roots Festival
