= Shaun Kirk =

- Born: 1988 (age 37–38); Melbourne, Victoria, Australia
- Genres: Soul, blues
- Occupations: Singer, songwriter, musician
- Instruments: Vocals, guitar, harmonica, percussion
- Years active: 2008 – present
- Label: Independent
- Website: www.shaunkirk.com

Shaun Kirk (born 1988) is an independent Australian soul and blues singer, songwriter, and musician. He has released four albums: Cruisin′ in 2010, Thank You For Giving Me the Blues in 2011, The Wick Sessions in 2013 and Steer the Wheel in 2014.

== Career ==
Shaun Kirk was born in Melbourne, Victoria, Australia, in 1988 and grew up in the city's outer eastern suburbs. He first picked up a guitar at age 16 after his mother left an old nylon string in his bedroom in the hope that it would spark some inspiration. It did and Kirk now often jokes at his shows about learning Deep Purple's "Smoke on the Water" as his first song. He broke his ankle at age 17 and wrote his first song in a hospital bed while waiting for surgery. Soon after he began singing and playing in front of small crowds at blues jam nights across Melbourne, initially as a folk singer before developing a feel for the blues music. Over the years he has matured his performance and now accompanies his guitar with harmonica, stomp box, tambourine, high hat, cymbal, kick and snare drum.

In January 2010, Kirk launched his debut album Cruisin, and shortly after embarked on his first national tour of Australia playing at many of the country's regional pubs, cafes and festivals. The album won the 'Best Debut Album' award at the Melbourne Blues Appreciation Society's annual VIC/TAS Blues Music Awards.

In August 2011 Shaun began working on his next album Thank You for Giving Me the Blues with Western Australian percussionist/producer Arunachala Satgunasingam. The album was released in December 2011 and by January 2012 had climbed to #1 on the Australian Blues/Roots Airplay Charts.

In December 2012 Kirk booked a session at the Wick Studios in Brunswick, Melbourne, to record a live CD/DVD called The Wick Sessions, which was released in March 2013.

In 2013 Kirk issued his fifth release, an EP titled Giving. It included the track "Give to the Needy", which featured part of Charlie Chaplin's speech from The Great Dictator.

Steer the Wheel, released in 2014, was recorded at the Wick Studios and was Kirk's first recording with a band, which included ARIA Award winning rhythm section Danny McKenna (drums) and Grant Cummerford (bass). The album debuted at #1 on the Australian Blues iTunes Charts and included three singles – "Stitches", "Give to the Needy" and "Two Hands on the Wheel" (the last featuring the duo Halfway to Forth) – which all received strong airplay across Australia and internationally.

Kirk has received consistent airplay on national Australian Triple J radio and ABC Radio National, as well as on ABC Local across Australia; consistently toured throughout Australia and abroad selling out headline shows, as well as opening for artists including Joe Bonamassa, Beth Hart, Allen Stone, JJ Grey & Mofro, Diesel, Ash Grunwald, Mia Dyson and Matt Andersen. He has become a regular name on Australia's festival circuit appearing at some of the country's biggest such as Byron Bay Bluesfest, Woodford Folk Festival, Port Fairy Folk Festival, Queenscliff Music Festival, St Kilda Festival, Gympie Music Muster, Caloundra Music Festival and Blues on Broadbeach.

== Reception ==
After witnessing Shaun's shows at the 2011 Woodford Folk Festival, music promoter and director of Bluesfest Byron Bay Peter Noble blogged about his performances calling him "a truly hot new artist on the blues scene".

Reviewing Shaun Kirk's performance at Northcote Social Club in May 2014, critic Bradley Cowan wrote: "Shaun Kirk proved that blues is still very much in fashion with his stellar performance... His energetic strumming and deep raspy voice hit all the right notes, causing sporadic beaming and shouts to erupt throughout the audience."

== Discography ==
=== Studio albums ===
- 2010: Cruisin′
- 2011: Thank You For Giving Me the Blues
- 2014: Steer the Wheel

=== Live albums ===
- 2013: The Wick Sessions (live in the studio CD/DVD package)

=== EPs ===
- 2013: Giving EP
- 2019: Shaun Kirk EP

== Awards and nominations ==
=== Music Victoria Awards ===
The Music Victoria Awards are an annual awards night celebrating Victorian music. They commenced in 2006.

Year	Nominee / work	Award	Result	Ref.
Music Victoria Awards of 2014	Steer the Wheel	Best Blues Album	Nominated	
