= Kiss the Sky =

Kiss the Sky may refer to:

- Kiss the Sky (film), a 1998 film directed by Roger Young
- Kiss the Sky, a music duo formed by Paul Hardcastle and Jaki Graham, or their 1991 album
- Kiss the Sky (Jimi Hendrix album), 1984
- Kiss the Sky (Tatyana Ali album) or the title song, 1998
- Kiss the Sky, an album by Claude Hay, 2007
- "Kiss the Sky" (Jason Derulo song), 2016
- "Kiss the Sky" (Maren Morris song), 2024
- "Kiss the Sky", a song by Cash Cash
- "Kiss the Sky", a song by Fitz and the Tantrums from All the Feels, 2019
- "Kiss the Sky", a song by the Knocks from 55, 2016
- "Kiss the Sky", a song by Machine Gun Kelly from Bloom, 2017
- "Kiss the Sky", a song by Shawn Lee
