= Claude Hay =

Claude Hay may refer to:

- Claude Hay (musician)
- Claude Hay (politician)
