= The California Honeydrops =

American blues and R&B band

- Lech Wierzynski in 2008

Background information
- Origin: Oakland, California, USA
- Genres: R&B; soul; blues
- Years active: 2007–Present
- Members: Lech Wierzynski; Ben Malament; Lorenzo Loera; Yanos "Johnny Bones" Lustig; Leon Cotter; Beaumont Beaullieu; Oliver Tuttle; Miles Lyons; Miles Blackwell
- Website: cahoneydrops.com

The California Honeydrops are a blues and R&B band founded by Lech Wierzynski in Oakland, California. Known for their "horn-fueled form of Southern soul and New Orleans funk," the band has toured across the United States. They have performed at festivals including DelFest, the Stern Grove Festival, Hardly Strictly Bluegrass, Outside Lands, and the Byron Bay Bluesfest, among others.

== History ==
The California Honeydrops was formed in 2007 in Oakland, California, by Lech Wierzynski.

Throughout the band's existence members have joined and others have left. Nansamba Ssensalo was dating frontman Lech Wierzynski when the band first started, but eventually left the group. They are also joined by other artists for some concerts but the consistent members include Lech Wierzynski, Benjamin Malament, Yanos “Johnny Bones” Lustig, Lorenzo Loera, and Beaumont Beaullieu.

Their first album, Soul Tub!, was released in November 2008 which was a year after the band was formed. Since then, they have gone on tour, performed at music festivals, and released 13 albums total.

== Discography ==
- Soul Tub! (Tubtone Records, November 2008)
- B-sides from The Blues Cave (2009)
- Spreadin' Honey (Tubtone Records, July 2010)
- Honeydrops Live (Tubtone Records, April 2012)
- Like You Mean It (Tubtone Records, April 2013)
- A Higher Degree (Tubtone Records, 2015)
- A River’s Invitation (Tubtone Records, September 2015)
- Call It Home VOL 1 & 2 (Tubtone Records, 2018)
- Honeydrops Live 2019 (2019)
- Remember When; Live, Vol 3 (2020)
- Covers from The Cave (2022)
- Soft Spot (Tubtone Records, 2022)
- Keep On Diggin' (2024)
