= Music Victoria Awards of 2014 =

2014 music awards in Victoria

- Date: 16 October 2014; November 2014
- Venue: The Age building, Melbourne, Victoria; 170 Russell, Melbourne, Victoria

Highlights
- Most wins: Courtney Barnett & Dan Sultan (2)

The Music Victoria Awards of 2014 are the ninth Annual Music Victoria Awards and consist of a series of awards, presented in October and November 2014.

The Genre awards were awarded on 16 October 2014 in The Age building, while the public voted, general awards were awarded in November on 170 Russell Street, Melbourne.

== Hall of Fame inductees ==
- Daddy Cool and Ed Nimmervoll

== Award nominees and winners ==
=== All genre Awards ===
Winners indicated in boldface, with other nominees in plain.

Best Album	Best Song
**Dan Sultan - Blackbird**; HTRK - Psychic 9-5 Club; King Gizzard & the Lizard Wizard - Oddments; Teeth & Tongue - Grids; Total Control - Typical System	**Courtney Barnett - "Avant Gardener"**; Banoffee - "Got It"; Fraser A Gorman - "Book of Love"; Laura Jean - "My First Love Song"; Total Control - "Flesh War"
Best Male	Best Female
**Dan Sultan**; Chet Faker; Mikelangelo; Rob Snarski; Vance Joy	**Courtney Barnett**; Jen Cloher; Jess Cornelius (Teeth & Tongue); Laura Jean; Missy Higgins
Best Band	Best Emerging Artist
**King Gizzard & the Lizard Wizard**; Client Liaison; Teeth & Tongue; Total Control; Wagons	**Remi**; Banoffee; Client Liaison; D.D Dumbo; Milwaukee Banks
Best Live Band	Best Venue
**Saskwatch**; Cosmic Psychos; Graveyard Train; Harmony; King Parrot	**The Corner Hotel**; 170 Russell, Melbourne; Cherry, Melbourne; Howler, Brunswick; The Forum Theatre, Melbourne
Best Regional Venue	Best Regional Act
**Bridge Hotel, Castlemaine**; Barwon Club, Geelong; Hallam Hotel, Hallam; Karova Lounge, Ballarat; Meeniyan Town Hall, Meeniyan	**Cosmic Psychos**; Briggs; D.D Dumbo; Freya Hollick; Stonefield
Best Festival	
**Meredith Music Festival**; Boogie; Falls Festival; Golden Plains Festival; Laneway Festival	

=== Genre Specific Awards ===
Best Blues Album	Best Country Album
**Greg Dodd & The Hoodoo Men - 3am Blues Live**; Dreamboogie - Ain't Nobody's Business; Ian Collard - Swamp, Stomp & Boogie; Kerri Simpson - 4am; Shaun Kirk - Steer the Wheel	**Lachlan Bryan & the Wildes - Black Coffee**; Eaten By Dogs - Eaten By Dogs; T-Bones - A Long Time Coming; Tracy McNeil - Nobody Ever Leaves; Wagons - Acid Rain & Sugar Cane
Best Soul, Funk, R'n'B and Gospel Album	Best Jazz Album
**Cookin' on 3 Burners - Blind Bet**; Chelsea Wilson - I Hope You'll Be Very Unhappy Without Me; Oscar Key Sung - Holograms; Saskwatch - Nose Dive; The Bamboos - Fever in the Road	**Anton Delecca Quartet - The Healers**; Andrea Keller Quartet with Strings - Wave Rider; Black Jesus Experience - Migration; Julien Wilson Trio - Swailing; Tilman Robinson - Network of Lines
Best Hip Hop Album	Best Electronic Act
**Briggs - Shep Life**; Geko - Real Heads Don't Listen; L-Fresh the Lion - One; Remi - Raw x Infinity; Tornts - Street Visions	**Chet Faker**; Andras Fox; Client Liaison; Dizz1; Will Sparks
Best Heavy Album	Best Indigenous Act
**Ausmuteants - Ausmuteants**; Ceres - I Don't Want to Be Anywhere But Here; Closure in Moscow – Pink Lemonade; Iron Mind - Iron Mind; The Bennies - Rainbows in Space	**The Deans**; Deline Briscoe; Kutcha Edwards; Philly; Skin Choir; Philly
Best Global or Reggae Album	Best Experimental/Avant-Garde Act
**Black Jesus Experience - Migration**; Coloured Stone - Dance to the Sun; Tek Tek Ensemble - Terror in the Jungle; The Bombay Royale - The Island of Dr Electrico; The Chosen Ones - The Chosen Ones	**Evelyn Morris**; Joel Stern; Nik Kennedy; Ren Walters; Rosalind Hall
Best Folk Roots Album	
**Charles Jenkins - Too Much Water in the Boat**; Laura Jean - Laura Jean; Oh Pep! - II; Tobias Hengeveld – Daylight Express; Tracy McNeil - Nobody Ever Leaves	
