= Clayton Doley =

Australian musician

Clayton Doley is an Australian musician, singer, songwriter, television musical director, arranger, and record producer best known for his Hammond Organ virtuosity. He started his own bands The Hands and Clayton Doley's Organ Donors.

== Career ==
=== Bands ===
At 16 he joined Adelaide blues band Double Whammy and at 18 he joined Sydney band The Mighty Reapers.

In 2002 Clayton and his brother Lachlan Doley formed soul band The Hands, driven by the duelling keyboards of Clayton on Hammond Organ and Lachlan on Hohner D6 Clavinet. The Hands have recorded two albums of original songs, "Live and Breathe" in 2004 and "Everything Is Wonderful" in 2008.

In 2006 Clayton Doley's Organ Donors was formed with longtime friends and fellow musicians Jak Housden on guitar (Badloves), James Haselwood on bass, and Dave Hibbard (also from The Hands) on drums. They regularly performed on the Australian festival circuit and have been referred to as Australia's answer to Booker T and the MG's. In 2010 Clayton Doley's Organ Donors released the instrumental album on Sundazed called Tension.

=== Solo ===
In 2012 Doley released his debut album as a solo artist, Desperate Times, an organ trio album recorded in Canada. The organ trio known as The Clayton Doley Organ Experience held down a successful residency gig at The Orbit Room in Toronto and performed mainly in Canada and Australia.

In 2015 Doley released his second album as a solo artist called Bayou Billabong. The album was recorded in both New Orleans, Louisiana, and Sydney, Australia, with past and present members of Jon Cleary (musician)'s band, The Absolute Monster Gentlemen as the rhythm section. It also features marching band brass from The Treme Funktet with members of Galactic and Trombone Shorty's Orleans Avenue. Australian backing vocalists Mahalia Barnes, Jade MacRae and Juanita Tippins (The Clay-Tones) feature heavily throughout and also appearing is didgeridoo player Ganga Giri and Canadian lap slide guitar player Harry Manx. In the week of its release, Bayou Billabong made it to Number 1 both in the iTunes Blues Charts and the US Roots Music Report Blues Chart and stayed in the Australian Blues and Roots Airplay Charts six months after its release.

=== Songwriter and producer ===
As a songwriter Doley has had his works recorded by The Whitlams, Jimmy Barnes, Mahalia Barnes, Jade MacRae, Ngaiire and Kara Grainger. He has produced tracks for Jimmy Barnes' platinum selling Double Happiness album and Jade MacRae's ARIA award-winning self-titled debut. Doley is credited with writing string arrangements as well as co-producing Harry Manx's 2017 release Faith Lift.

In 2023 he was credited with writing string arrangements for Ian Moss's new album.

=== Session musician ===
As a recording session musician Clayton is most often credited as playing the Hammond Organ and is sometimes listed as Clayton Dooley. He also performs on a wide variety of keyboard instruments and has been credited with playing piano, wurlitzer, rhodes, clavinet and mellotron.

He has played on albums for artists such as Harry Manx, A Camp Eugene "Hideaway" Bridges, Jimmy Barnes, The Whitlams, Troy Cassar-Daley, James Blundell, Jackie Orszaczky, Mahalia Barnes, Jade Macrae, Kevin Borich, and the Starlite Campbell Band.

Doley played keyboards for the Netflix original animated series Beat Bugs released in 2016. IMDb lists him for all 26 episodes.

As a live session musician, Clayton has played for Steve Cropper and Donald "Duck" Dunn from Booker T and The MG's, Larry Braggs and David Garibaldi from Tower of Power, The Divinyls, Nigel Kennedy, Eugene "Hideaway" Bridges

== Other activities ==
As has worked as a television musical director for such shows as Good News Week broadcast on Network 10, The Sideshow broadcast on the ABC network, Melbourne International Comedy Festival (MICF) Opening Night Gala 2009 and 2010 broadcast on Network 10 and musical director for The Great Debate 2011 broadcast on Network 10.

Doley was musical director for Jimmy Webb's 2018 tour of Australia, where he performed with an orchestra as well as special guests.
