= Lacy Homestead =

Historic house in Mississippi, United States

- U.S. National Register of Historic Places
- Location within Mississippi Location within the United States
- Nearest city: Toomsuba, Mississippi
- Area: 26.3 acres (10.6 ha)
- Built: 1902
- Architect: William Austin Lacy
- Architectural style: Late 19th And 20th Century Revivals
- NRHP reference No.: 07000747
- Added to NRHP: July 19, 2007

Lacy Homestead, also known as the William Austin Lacy House, is one of the only surviving remnants of a settlement in northern Lauderdale County, Mississippi, known as "Little Georgia". The first settlers of this area came from Jackson County, Georgia, and areas of Virginia, bringing their customs and architectural styles with them to the area. The homestead was listed on the National Register of Historic Places in 2007.

== Settlement ==
The first four families to settle "Little Georgia"–the Hardins, the Culpeppers, the Yarboroughs, and the Lacys–moved into the area in the 1830s and 1840s. The Hardins, Culpeppers, and Lacys were all farmers, most likely in the cotton business. The Culpeppers and the Hardins moved from Jackson County, Georgia, thus the label "Little Georgia."

The Lacys, on the other hand, had been successful farmers in Virginia at the turn of the 19th century; those that moved to Mississippi were most likely looking for new farmable land. Austin Lacy, who had fought in the War of 1812, had left Virginia and set up residence in St. Helena Parish, Louisiana by 1816; by 1830 he lived in Marengo County, Alabama; and by 1840 he was in Kemper County, Mississippi, just north of Lauderdale County. Austin's grandson Stephen purchased 410 acres of farmland in Lauderdale County in 1841, making him the first Lacy to actually reside in the Little Georgia community. After Stephen was killed in the Siege of Vicksburg during the American Civil War, his son William Austin Lacy, with whom the Lacy Homestead is most commonly associated, inherited the property. The Lacy family during William Austin Lacy's time was a large family, consisting of him, his wife Estelle, and ten children.

As many as sixteen houses were built in this area, though as of the 2007 listing on the National Register only four remain, one being the Lacy house.

== Architecture ==
The defining architecture of the Little Georgia community is that of vernacular 19th century Georgia, from where most of the settlers moved. Seven types of architecture found in Georgia during the period when the pioneer families moved to Mississippi seem to have influenced the community: single and double pen, hall-parlor, dogtrot, saddlebag, central hall house, and double pile (also referred to as "Georgian cottage" architecture).

The Lacy house, built in 1902 and listed on the National Register of Historic Places in 2007, is built in the Georgian cottage style. Most Georgian cottage style buildings were built between the years of 1850 and 1890, so the use of this architectural style in 1902 reflects the conservative attitude that many in the settlement felt toward new architectural practices. While surrounding areas moved into new architectural styles such as bungalows, cottages, and revival high style houses, Little Georgia remained true to their architectural roots.

=== Floor plan and alterations ===
The Lacy house follows the typical floor plan of houses in the community, and the materials used to build it come from the immediate area. The wood used to build the structure came from William Austin Lacy's own sawmill. A central hallway runs down the center of the structure, and four rooms flank the hallway, two on each side. Sometime between 1903 and 1921, a room was added to the southwest corner of the house to serve as a kitchen and dining room. A section of the central hallway was divided off in the 1960s to serve as a bathroom. There is a front porch which extends across the entire front facade of the building, and there was originally a back porch as well, though it has now been removed. When the extra room was added, a third porch was built alongside the room. This third porch was replaced in 2001 because of "rot and instability." The roof of the house was originally made of wood. Asphalt shingles were added in the 1970s, and two original chimneys were removed. The roof was rebuilt again in 2006, and a durable metal was used.

It was not until the 1930s or 1940s that a sink with running water was installed in the add-on kitchen, and full, modern plumbing was not added to the house until the 1970s. Also in the 1930s, a telephone was added, becoming the only telephone in the community. Electricity was added to the house just before World War II.

=== Room usage ===
In most of Little Georgia's houses, one room in the front of the house served as a parlor (though many times it doubled as a bedroom); the other rooms were primarily used as bedrooms. The room in the northeast corner of the Lacy house served as the parlor for entertaining guests and is thus designed with more ornate woodwork than the other three bedrooms. The mantle above the fireplace in this room also contains more intricate details than the other rooms. Although the room was used mainly to entertain guests, it has almost always doubled as a bedroom because of the large size of the Lacy family.

Because the room on the northwest corner was more likely to be viewed by guests when the house was built, it too was designed with more ornate woodwork, but the mantle does not contain as many decorations as the parlor room does. As the house has been passed down through the Lacy family, only females have stayed in this room, so the family simply calls it "the girls' room." The room on the southeast corner is known as "the boys' room" and is not decorated as extensively as the front two rooms. The master bedroom is in the southwest corner and contains three doors to access the parlor, the central hallway, and the kitchen/dining room, although the latter would have led directly outside before the kitchen/dining room was added.

The layout and room usage of the Lacy house is very pragmatic, providing ample sleeping quarters for the large Lacy family. Instead of having separate rooms for every activity (laundry, kitchen, dining room, etc.), all of the rooms in the Lacy house had overlapping uses to allow for more bed space. Although in modern architecture a bedroom is considered a personal space, the Lacy family and the rest of the Little Georgia community used them as utilitarian spaces. Work would be conducted in each of the rooms during the day; the fact that people slept there at the end of the day was a mere add-on. In the "boys' bedroom" (southeast corner), quilting rings hung from the ceiling, allowing work to be done on the quilt during the day. At night, the quilt could be raised up so that someone could sleep in the room. Before the kitchen/dining room was added, the central hallway also doubled as an eating area. Also, because of the agrarian nature of the community in those days, most work was done outside of the home anyway, so all the building was really needed for was somewhere to lay down at night.

While the structures in Little Georgia maintained this pragmatic, functional floor plan, many other communities in the surrounding area began to experiment with new architectural styles, splitting out rooms for specific functions. Builders in nearby Cuba, Alabama, during the same period, were building structures with Victorian architecture and Greek Revival, as well as other newer styles. The Little Georgia community's reluctance to adopt these new practices reflects a mindset of conservatism and isolationism in the people that lived there. They Lacy house exemplifies this conservative nature and provides a window into the isolated agrarian society that was present throughout Lauderdale County before the advent of modern cities and transportation networks.
