= Irish Mythen =

Canadian singer-songwriter

- Born: Ireland
- Origin: Canada
- Genres: Folk
- Occupation: Singer-songwriter
- Years active: 2007–present
- Website: www.irishmythen.com

Irish Mythen is an Irish-born Canadian contemporary folk singer-songwriter. In recent years, Mythen has performed with Rod Stewart, Gordon Lightfoot and Lucinda Williams at major festival stages the world over. Mythen's first two full-length albums were Sweet Necessity in 2008 and Open Here in 2011. They moved to Prince Edward Island in 2007, where they won the Songwriter of the Year Award in 2016 for their song "Gypsy Dancer". Their third album, released in 2014 titled Irish Mythen, won the East Coast Music Association 2015 Roots Album of the Year. They were included alongside several female artists at the 2018 edition of the legendary Cambridge Folk Festival, who were singled out by the Guardian newspaper in their praise of new (since 2017) festival booker Bev Burton's female-heavy line-up for the festival.

Their album Little Bones received a Juno Award nomination for Contemporary Roots Album of the Year at the Juno Awards of 2020, and won the Canadian Folk Music Award for Solo Artist of the Year at the 15th Canadian Folk Music Awards.

== Personal life ==
Mythen uses they/them pronouns.
