= Pierce Brothers =

Australian country music band

- Origin: Melbourne, Australia
- Genres: Folk music, blues and roots
- Years active: 2009–present
- Members: Jack Pierce; Patrick Pierce
- Website: www.piercebrothers.com

Pierce Brothers are an Australian folk and blues and roots duo, consisting of twin brothers Jack and Patrick Pierce.

The duo released their debut studio album Atlas Shoulders, in October 2018.

== History ==
The Pierce Brothers began their career busking on Bourke Street, Melbourne in 2009 and were playing bigger shows and festivals by 2014.

In 2014 the duo's EP The Night Tree debuted at No. 21 on the ARIA Albums Chart.

In March 2021, the duo released Into the Great Unknown.

In March 2024, the duo released their third studio album, Everything Is Bigger Than Me, which Jade Kennedy from Rolling Stone Australia said "[has] catchy melodies, earworm hooks, charming lyricism and stunning vocal harmonies"

== Discography ==
=== Studio albums ===
List of studio albums, with release date and label shown
Title	Album details	Peak chart positions
Title	Album details	AUS
Atlas Shoulders	Released: 26 October 2018; Label: Warner Music Australia (5419702715); Formats: CD, LP, digital download, streaming	13
Into the Great Unknown	Released: March 2021; Label: Pierce Brothers (PBITGU42069-CD); Formats: CD, LP, digital download, streaming	—
Everything Is Bigger Than Me	Released: 29 March 2024; Label: Pierce Brothers (PB24EIBTM-CD); Formats: CD, LP, digital download, streaming	14
Moonrise	Released: 28 November 2025; Label: Pierce Brothers; Formats: digital download, streaming	14

=== Live albums ===
List of live albums, with release date and label shown
Title	Album details
Live @ the Corner	Released: 2014; Label: Pierce Brothers, Mushroom; Formats: CD+DVD; Recorded: November 2014
Three Deep Breaths	Released: 13 September 2019; Label: Pierce Brothers, Mushroom (1234); Formats: CD, digital download, streaming
Live at Chapel Off Chapel	Released: 21 October 2021; Label: Pierce Brothers; Formats: digital download, streaming

=== Extended plays ===
List of EP, with release date and label shown
Title	Album details	Peak chart positions
Title	Album details	AUS
A Self Portrait	Released: 2009; Label: Pierce Brothers; Formats: CD	—
Pierce Brothers	Released: 2011; Label: Pierce Brothers; Formats: CD	—
Blind Boys Run	Released: August 2013; Label: Pierce Brothers; Formats: CD, digital download, streaming	—
The Night Tree	Released: May 2014; Label: Pierce Brothers; Formats: CD, digital download, streaming	21
Into the Dirt	Released: 25 September 2015; Label: Warner Music Australia (5419678972); Formats: CD, digital download, streaming	10
The Records Were Ours	Released: 19 May 2017; Label: Warner Music Australia (5419770182); Formats: CD, LP, digital download, streaming	9
My Tired Mind	Released: 17 November 2017; Label: Lemon Tree, Warner Music Australia (5419787362); Formats: CD, LP, digital download, streaming	31

== Awards and nominations ==
=== Environmental Music Prize ===
The Environmental Music Prize is a quest to find a theme song to inspire action on climate and conservation. It commenced in 2022.

Year	Nominee / work	Award	Result	Ref.
2025	"In the Water"	Environmental Music Prize	Nominated	
