= Lachy Doley =

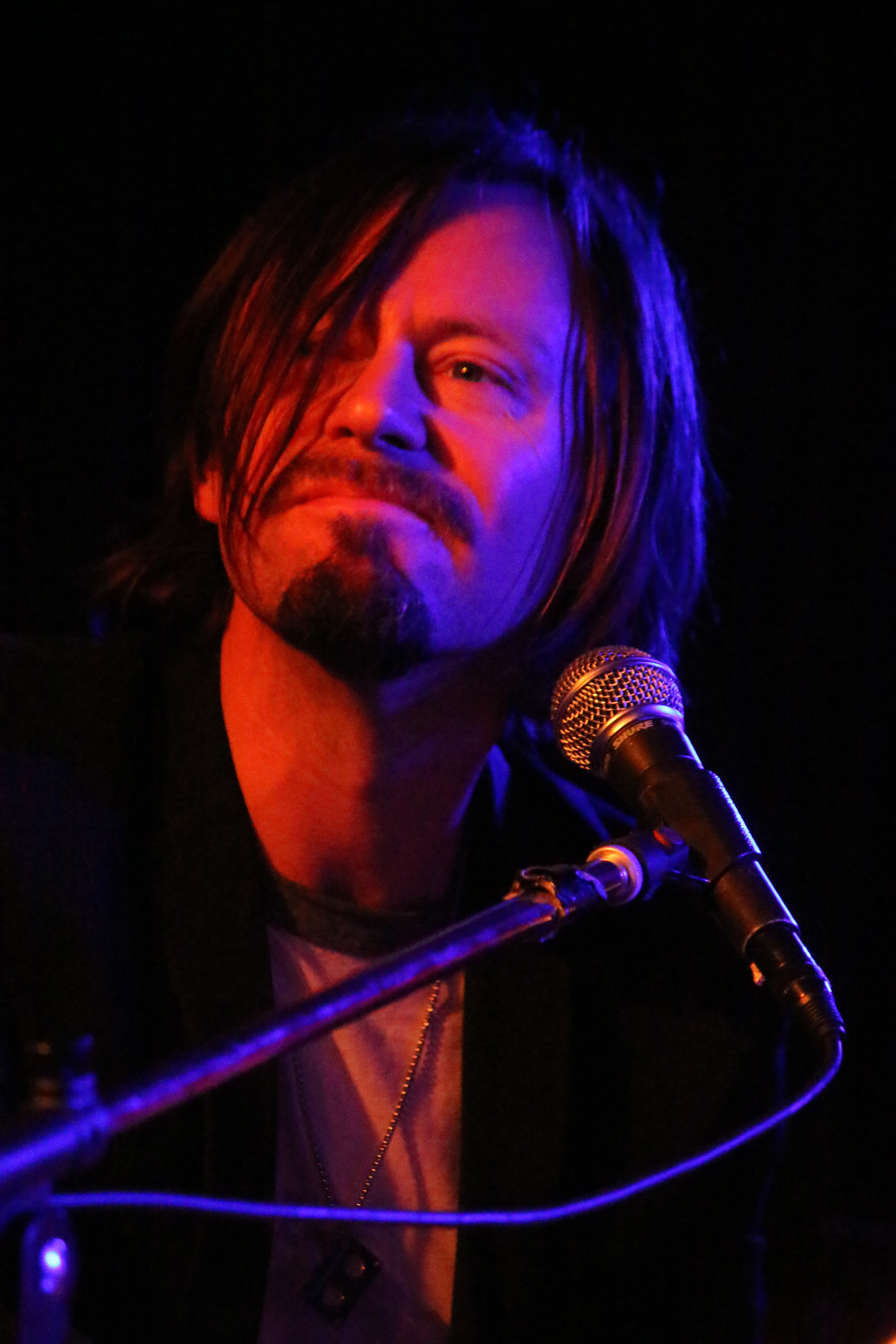
- Doley in 2020

Background information
- Born: Lachlan R Doley
- Origin: Adelaide, South Australia, Australia
- Genres: Blues; pop; rock
- Occupations: Musician; singer; songwriter
- Instruments: Keyboards; vocals
- Years active: 1995–present
- Website: lachydoley.com

Lachlan R. Doley is an Australian musician, singer and songwriter best known for playing the Hammond organ and whammy clavinet. Doley has recorded and/or toured with Jimmy Barnes, Glenn Hughes, Billy Thorpe, Joe Bonamassa, and Powderfinger. Doley has issued one album as a solo artist, Typically Individual Conforming Anti-Social (2011) and four albums fronting Lachy Doley Group. Lovelight peaked at number 40 on the ARIA Albums Chart.

== Early life and education ==
Lachy Doley grew up in Adelaide, where he started a course at university.

In the early 1990s his older brother, Clayton Doley, was a member of Sydney-based blues and roots group, Bondi Cigars, before turning to session work. During a break from his uni Doley joined Clayton in Sydney in the mid-1990s also as a session musician. In 1999 Clayton travelled to New York while Doley continued his local session work.

== Career ==
=== 2002–2009: Musical beginnings ===
In 2002 the brothers reunited in Sydney and formed a classic rock and soul band, the Hands, with Doley on a Hohner clavinet and Clayton on a Hammond organ. They issued two albums, Live and Breathe (2004) and Everything Is Wonderful (2008). Brett Winterford of The Sydney Morning Herald observed the first album was "sung by guest soul vocalists Jade MacRae, Kara Grainger and Mahalia Barnes. The band struggled to afford to tour with guest vocalists and so narrowed their act to a four-piece (the brothers backed by drums and bass). By necessity, the brothers took to singing themselves."

Doley provided piano and Hammond organ for Powderfinger's fifth studio album, Vulture Street (July 2003), as a recording session musician. Subsequently, the group used him as their touring keyboardist from mid-2007 to 2010.

=== 2010–present: Solo artist and Lachy Doley Group ===
As a solo artist, Doley released his debut studio album Typically Individual Conforming Anti-Social in October 2011.

In 2012, Doley worked on a cover version of "Highway Star" for the Deep Purple tribute album, Re-Machined: A Tribute to Deep Purple's Machine Head (2012).

In 2013, Doley has fronted the eponymous Lachy Doley Group which has issued four albums, S.O.S (Singer Organ Soul) (September 2013), Conviction (May 2015), Lovelight (January 2017) and Make or Break (March 2019). Lovelight debuted at No. 40 on the ARIA Albums Chart

Doley is a regular member of Jimmy Barnes' live shows, including his 2017 Australia Day set aboard a ship in Sydney Harbour.

In September 2021, Studios 301 Sessions debuted at number 13 on the ARIA Charts.

== Discography ==
=== Albums ===
Title	Details	Peak chart positions
Title	Details	AUS
Typically Individual Conforming Anti-Social	Released: October 2011; Label: Lachy Doley	—
Singer Organ Soul (as Lachy Doley Group)	Released: September 2013; Label: Lachlan Doley	—
Live at 303 (as Lachy Doley Group)	Released: April 2014; Label: All the Stops; Note: Live album	—
Conviction (as Lachy Doley Group)	Released: 30 May 2015; Label: All the Stops	—
Lovelight (as Lachy Doley Group)	Released: 20 January 2017; Label: All the Stops	40
Live at Blues on Broadbeach 2016 (as Lachy Doley Group)	Released: 19 May 2017; Label: All the Stops; Note: Live album	—
Make or Break (as Lachy Doley Group)	Released: 1 March 2019; Label: All the Stops	—
Double Figures	Released: 12 October 2020; Label: All the Stops	76
Studios 301 Sessions	Released: 17 September 2021; Label: All the Stops (ATS009CD)	13
A World Worth Fighting For	Released: June 2023; Label: All the Stops	—

== Awards and nominations ==
=== National Live Music Awards ===
The National Live Music Awards (NLMAs) are a broad recognition of Australia's diverse live industry, celebrating the success of the Australian live scene. The awards commenced in 2016.

Year	Nominee / work	Award	Result
National Live Music Awards of 2016	Lachy Doley	Live Instrumentalist of the Year	Nominated
