= Harts (musician) =

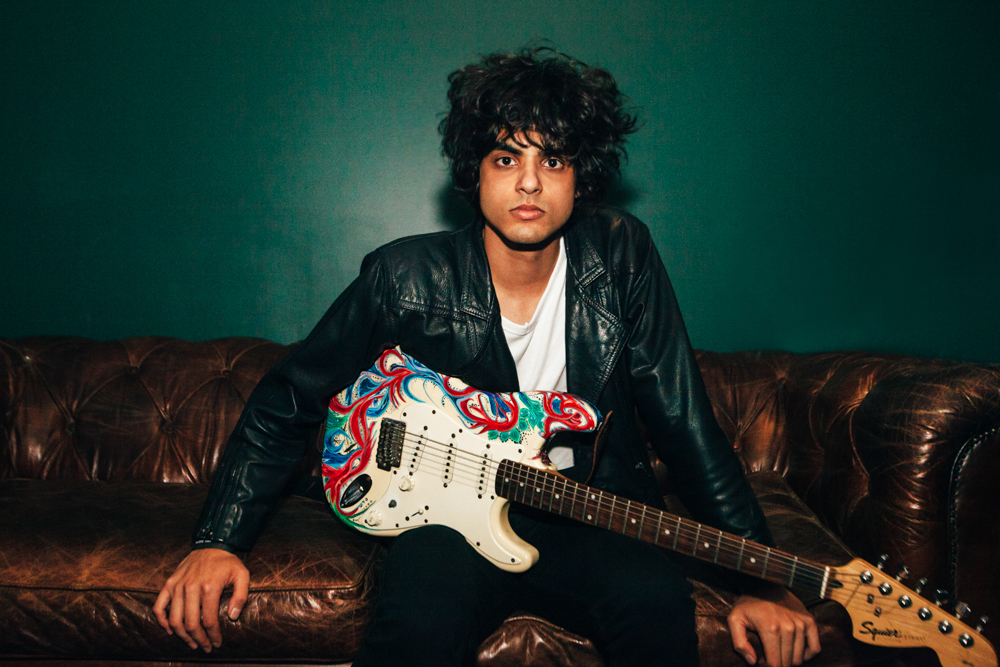

Background information
- Birth name: Darren Hart
- Born: 1991 (age 33–34) Chennai, India
- Origin: Melbourne, Victoria, Australia
- Genres: Funk, Pop, Alternative Rock, Electronic Indie, Nu-Disco, Blues
- Occupation(s): Musician, Multi-instrumentalist, Composer, Music Producer
- Instrument(s): Electric guitar, keyboards, drums, bass guitar, synthesizer, vocals
- Years active: 2008–present
- Website: hartsmusic.com

Darren Hart (born 1991), better known as Harts, is an Indian-Australian musician, multi-instrumentalist, composer and music producer from Melbourne, Australia. He composes, produces and records his own music in his bedroom studio. Harts' music has been described as dance-oriented alternative rock and electronic indie, blending elements of funk, post-disco, psychedelic rock, soul, jazz, new romanticism, and blues.

More recently, Harts has become known for his Hendrix-like guitar playing and blend of funk, pop, rock and soul music, which has earned praise from wide range of musicians such as Prince, Questlove, Nick Littlemore, André Cymone, Lars Stalfors and publications such as Time, Rolling Stone, NME and more. His voice and music also bears resemblance to that of Lenny Kravitz, who he worked with on the unreleased Rio 2016 Olympic Games theme song with American hip-hop band the Roots.

Harts was awarded the GQ Breakthrough Solo Artist of the Year award at the 2016 GQ Australia Men of the Year Awards.

== Biography ==
Born to track and field athlete parents in Chennai, India, the family moved to Australia when he was around two years old. He grew up in the Melbourne suburb of Point Cook and went to Heathdale Christian College. He has said in interviews that he first started learning music in High School when he was 15 or 16 years old, starting with drums and eventually teaching himself guitar, keyboards and music production.

== Career ==
=== 2009–2013: Offtime ===
Harts' first release, a teaser track and demo titled "Back to the Shore," was released on iTunes on 19 August 2010 through Australian independent A&R company, The A&R Department, headed by former Warner Music A&R Manager Matt O'Connor. The original demo, along with a few other tracks, attracted attention on the internet, leading to an offer from Lars Stalfors of The Mars Volta to mix the tracks. The newer versions of the tracks mixed by Stalfors formed Harts' debut EP, Offtime.

Offtime was released in 2012. All songs on the EP were composed, produced, arranged, written and performed by Harts. All songs were written and recorded between 2009 and 2010, when he was 18/19 years old. The EP received positive reviews which included many online blog features and music publications. It was mixed in Los Angeles by Lars Stalfors and mastered in New York by Heba Kadry. Stalfors said of working with Harts, "He has such a great ear for melody and his production is so unique, which is what I love".

The music director of Australian radio station Triple J, Richard Kingsmill, quoted Harts as "A one[-]man music[-]making machine."

On 4 October 2013, Hart revealed a new track via his Facebook page and blog, titled "Leavn It All Behind". The song quickly gained much attention on music blogs and social media, which led to the track being released independently as a single on 11 November 2013. The release featured two versions of the song: the extended 12-inch mix and a radio edit.

"Leavn It All Behind" was released to positive reviews and marked a clear shift in momentum for Hart. Paul Lester, of The Guardian, featured Harts as the "New Band of the Day" on 20 December 2013 in an article which referred to Hart as a "Super-talented Aussie pop funkateer who does everything – write, perform, produce, arrange – in his PJs", referring to Hart's bedroom home-studio ethic. Astonished by Hart, Lester wrote "...he's able to reference said genres so skilfully and assimilate their influence with such a mastery and attention to detail", later going on to make the remark that "In a world where someone like Bastille can become a breakout star, Harts should be No 1 everywhere, including other planets."

The single was also released with an accompanying live video of Harts performing the song in a studio rehearsal room. Hart reported on his blog that the video went on to catch the attention and praise of one of his musical idols, Prince.

French nightly news and television talk show, Le Grand Journal featured 'Leavn It All Behind' during the show's "Coming Next" segments, which aired weeknights on Canal+ from 6–10 January 2014.

=== 2014–15: Daydreamer ===
On 24 February 2014, Harts released the single "Lovers in Bloom" from his upcoming debut album. The single charted at No. 30 on The Hype Machine and gained independent radio play worldwide as well as many blog features. Harts gained further exposure when the video for the single was tweeted by Questlove of The Roots and Prince's 3RDEYEGIRL Twitter account.

Prince was quoted as saying, "He reminds me of how I was at that age" after it was revealed that Harts had spent time jamming with Prince at his Paisley Park Studios in Minneapolis.

"Red & Blue", the fourth single from the album, was released on 15 August 2014. It quickly landed a spot on Triple J's 'Hit List' as well as being added to high rotation. It was confirmed by Harts that the single was Prince's favourite song off the album.

On 5 September 2014, Harts released his debut album, Daydreamer. Daydreamer was released to positive reviews, which included many online and print music publications and articles globally. Rolling Stone Australia described Harts as "A supernaturally talented young buck who's mastered Hendrix's blistering guitar shredding and the electro-funk pop perfection of Prince in his Eighties prime."

On 7 November 2014, Harts announced and released a new single, titled "When a Man's a Fool". The single was added to high rotation on Triple J radio as well as landing another spot on the Triple J 'Hit List'. Harts announced Australian tour dates to promote the release throughout December 2014–January 2015. Another new single, titled "Breakthrough", was released in February 2015, which was announced to be included on a new EP release of the same name. The Breakthrough EP was released in June 2015.

=== 2016–17: Smoke Fire Hope Desire ===
In February 2016, Harts released "Peculiar", the first official single from his upcoming sophomore album. "Peculiar" went on to become Harts' most popular song to date, earning him exposure through radio, streaming, and major online publications. Harts released his second album, Smoke Fire Hope Desire, on 16 September 2016. The album also featured the singles "Power", "Hope" and "Fear in Me". The album peaked at number 22 on the ARIA Album Charts, while Australian radio station Triple J also selected the album as their “Album Of The Week”. The album went on to earn Harts a GQ Men Of The Year award in 2016 in the category of Breakthrough Solo Artist Of The Year.

In 2017, Harts announced he had signed to American record label Razor & Tie/Washington Square for the release of Smoke Fire Hope Desire in the United States. The album was released in the United States on 21 July 2017, and was accompanied by a small U.S. tour. Razor & Tie was acquired by Concord Music on January 17, 2018, and has since parted ways with Harts.

=== 2019–Present ===
In 2018–19, American rapper Joey Bada$$ recruited Hart to play guitar in his live band for Triple J’s live music segment "Like A Version".

In February 2019, Miami-based rapper Denzel Curry also featured Hart on guitar for his cover of Rage Against The Machine’s "Bulls On Parade". The performance went viral, amassing millions of views online and critical acclaim worldwide. The performance resulted in a #5 position in the Triple J Hottest 100 of 2019.

Also in 2019, Hart featured as the talent in iconic guitar brand Fender’s campaign for their new 2020 Ultra Series Stratocaster.

Hart also stepped into modelling in 2020, landing the front cover and a 10-page spread in the David Jones men's magazine Mr Jones.

Hart was chosen to perform as the headline talent at the 2020 Women's T20 World Cup Opening Ceremony at Sydney Showground Stadium in February 2020 after it was announced he had been hand-picked to record the official campaign theme song.

Hart also announced a special live Australian tour for 2020, dedicated to celebrating the work and the 50-year legacy of Jimi Hendrix. He announced on social media that the tour has now been postponed until further notice due to the current COVID-19 pandemic.

Aside from new singles, Hart frequently uploads mashups and live jams on his YouTube channel.

== Discography ==
=== Albums ===
List of albums, with selected chart positions
Title	Album details	Peak chart positions
Title	Album details	AUS
Daydreamer	Released: September 2014; Format: CD; Label: A&R Pavement Records (3967772)	-
Smoke Fire Hope Desire	Released: September 2016; Format: CD, LP, digital; Label: Dew Process (DEW9000883)	22
Queens Kings & All Big Things	Released: 2018; Format: digital; Label: Marshmallow Pavement Records	-

=== EPs ===
List of EPs, with selected details
Title	Details
Offtime	Released: 2012; Format: CD; Label: A&R Pavement Records (2790488)
Breakthrough	Released: June 2015; Format: CD; Label: A&R Pavement Records (3967792)
