= Max Jury =

American musician

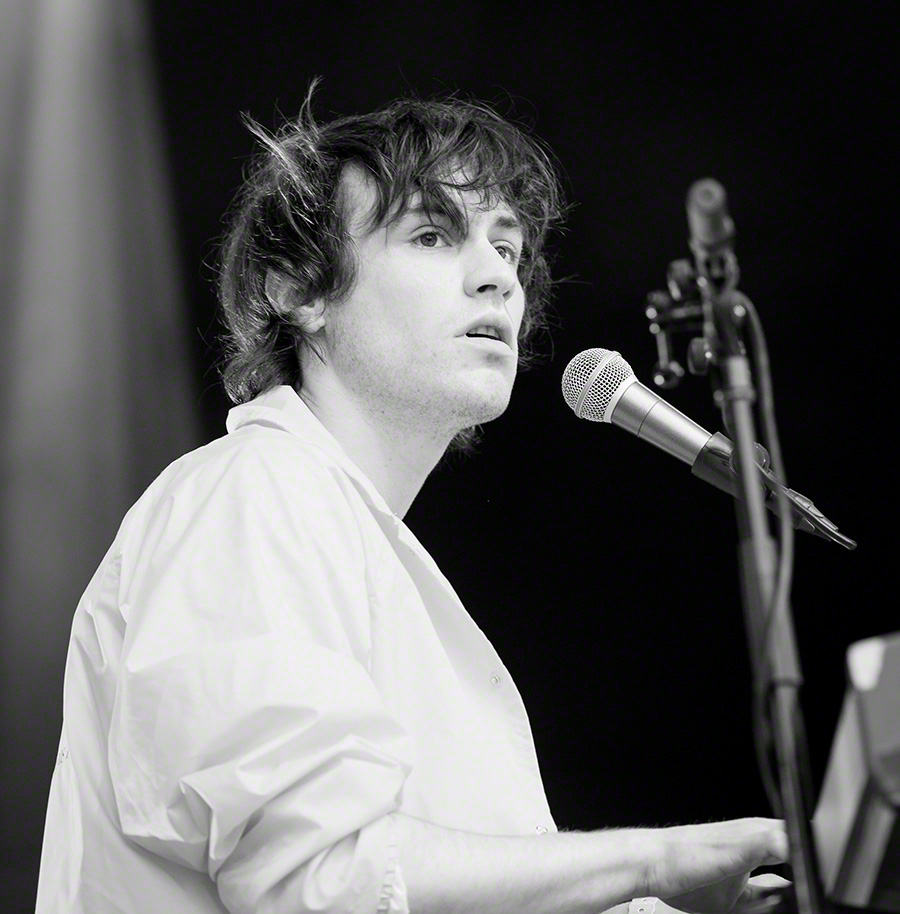

Background information
- Birth name: Maxwell Jury
- Born: May 12, 1992 (age 33)
- Origin: Des Moines, Iowa, US
- Occupations: Singer; songwriter; musician
- Labels: Marathon Artists
- Website: maxjury.com

Max Jury (born May 12, 1992) is an American singer-songwriter from Des Moines, Iowa, now living in London, United Kingdom. He has released three studio albums, Max Jury (2016), Modern World (2019) and Avenues (2023).

== Career ==
On June 3, 2016, Max Jury released his eponymous debut studio album which includes his breakthrough single "Numb". He has toured with Lana Del Rey and Rufus Wainwright.

His second studio album, Modern World, was released on May 31, 2019, by Marathon Artists. It was produced by Robin Hannibal, a four-time Grammy-nominated producer and songwriter, best known for his co-writing credit on Kendrick Lamar's "Bitch, Don't Kill My Vibe".

== Accolades ==
Year	Organization	Accolade	Artist/work	Ranking	Source
2016	Pop Magazine	Best Albums of 2016	Max Jury	13	
2019	Pop Magazine	Best Albums of 2019	Modern World	19	
2019	Pop Magazine	Best Songs of 2019	"Modern World"	5	

== Discography ==
=== Studio albums ===
- Max Jury (2016)
- Modern World (2019)
- Avenues (2023)

=== EPs ===
- Something in the Air (2014)
- All I Want (The Sonic Factory Sessions) (2014)
- Under The Covers (2017)
- Notes From California – Demos EP (2018)
- The Shade and the Grass (2021)

=== Singles ===
- "Home" (2015)
- "Great American Novel" (2015)
- "Numb" (2016)
- "Beg & Crawl" (2016)
- "Standing On My Own" (2016)
- "Little Jean Jacket" (2016)
- "Sweet Lie" (2019)
- "Gone" (2019)
- "Modern World" (2019)
- "The Desperate Kingdom of Love" (with Fenne Lily) (2021)
- "Highway Song" (2021)
- "Is This Love?" (feat. Delilah Montagu) (2022)
