= Peter Noble (music promoter) =

Australian entrepreneur in the music industry

Peter Bruce Noble OAM
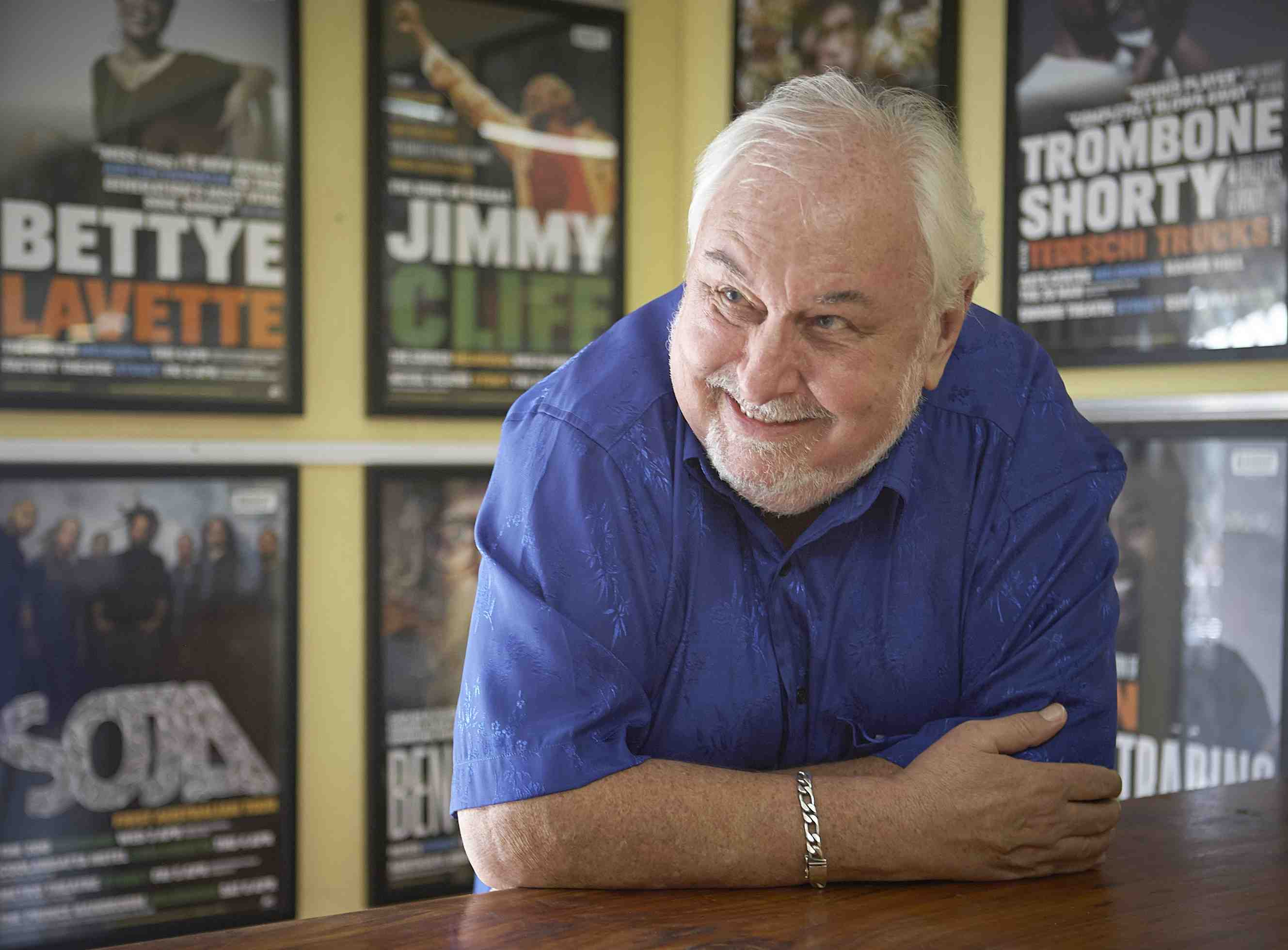
- Noble in Byron Bay
- Occupation: Director Byron Bay Bluesfest
- Years active: 1960s–present
- Spouse: Dyah Noble
- Website: Byron Bay Bluesfest

Peter Bruce Noble is an Australian entrepreneur who is best known as the festival director of the annual Bluesfest Byron Bay that he became a partner of in 1994.

Noble's contribution to the industry was recognised in 2014 when he was awarded The Rolling Stone Australia Award for his services to Australian Music. On Australia Day 2016, he was awarded the Medal of the Order of Australia (OAM) for service to live and recorded music, to tourism, and to the community.

Following on from the 2025 festival where Noble said would be the last the 2026 event was surprisingly announced to go ahead. Three weeks before the 2026 event, Noble announced the cancellation of the event due to poor ticket sales. Liquidators who had been appointed some time before the announcement, stated that ticket holders would be unlikely to receive any money back.

== Biography ==
Noble is a Sydney-born bassist who played in rock, soul and blues bands during the 1960s and '70s, taking leading roles with artists including Clapham Junction, and Marcia Hines. He settled in the US and set up Portland, Oregon's first International Jazz Festival, and was house booker at The Earth venue.

Noble returned to Australia at the beginning of the 1980s, and became a pioneer for blues touring in Australia. In 1990, Noble put the San Francisco band the Flamin' Groovies on a financially mismanaged 80-day, 80-city tour of Europe, which shattered the group. The Groovies disbanded in 1991.

He supplied two international acts for the East Coast Blues Festival with Canned Heat in 1990 & John Mayall in 1991 and became a director alongside founder Keven Oxford for the 1994 event. In December 2004 Noble along with four partners acquired founder Keven Oxford's 50% share in the event.

Noble ran AIM Records, which became the first and only Australian independent label to win a Grammy Award in 2008 for ‘Best Zydeco Or Cajun Music Album’, by Terrance Simien & The Zydeco Experience. The same year the label got nominated for a second Grammy for Best Tropical Album 'Greetings From Havana'. Noble has worked in many areas of the music business including record producing, touring artists through his company Bluesfest Touring, artist management, setting up the Australian Artists Agency in the early '70s, event site development, and festival presentations throughout Australia and South East Asia.

Noble's long-standing dream to produce an Indigenous festival was realised in 2013 when he collaborated with leading cultural creative Rhoda Roberts, producing the inaugural Boomerang Festival: a ground-breaking Indigenous festival for all Australians held at the home of Bluesfest, the Tyagarah Tea Tree Farm, to extensive acclaim.

Noble is the Director of the Byron Bay festival. Bluesfest creates ongoing employment and contracts for individuals and small businesses in the Byron Bay and the Northern Rivers. Noble resides and works between Byron Bay and Bali.
