= Con Brio (band) =

American soul and rock and roll band

- Origin: San Francisco, California, United States
- Genres: R&B; soul; rock and roll
- Years active: 2013–present
- Members: Sarah Clarke; Jonathan Kirchner; Andrew Laubacher; Benjamin Andrews; Patrick Monaco Glynn; Marcus Stephens; Brendan Liu
- Past members: Micah Dubreuil; Xandra Corpora; Nate Fowle; Ziek McCarter

Con Brio is an American soul and rock and roll band formed in San Francisco, California in 2009. The band currently consists of lead singer Sarah Clarke, guitarist Benjamin Andrews, bassist Jonathan Kirchner, keyboardist Patrick Monaco Glynn, drummer Andrew Laubacher, and horn players Marcus Stephens and Brendan Liu.

Named after the musical direction that means "with spirit", Con Brio is known for their high-energy funk, R&B sound. They recorded and released an LP in 2010 called From The Hip, an EP in 2015 called Kiss the Sun, and their first full-length album, Paradise, in 2016.

== History ==
=== Formation ===
"Born in the spring of 2009, after singer/guitarist Xandra Corpora posted an ad on Craigslist, Con Brio — named for a musical directive that means “with spirit” — came together through a haphazard series of friend dates and open-mic jam sessions around San Francisco."

=== Lead Singer Transition (2013-14) ===
Corpora left the band in early 2013, and McCarter stepped into the role of lead singer. McCarter grew up in Houston with dreams of becoming a performer, inspired by the likes of Michael Jackson and Marvin Gaye. He moved to San Francisco after high school and got into the local music scene, where he met keyboardist Micah Dubreuil, Andrews, Kirchner, Laubacher, Stephens, and Brendan Liu. In 2013, Con Brio was formed, with McCarter saying the band's name "indicates to play that section of that song like you mean it. It became a philosophy. Do it like you mean it or don’t do it at all."

=== Kiss the Sun EP (2015) ===
Con Brio released their first EP, Kiss the Sun, on February 3, 2015. They toured the West Coast playing their six-song set, and eventually toured the rest of the U.S. and Europe. Their most notable showing yet was at the 2015 Austin City Limits Music Festival where they earned rave reviews from music bloggers. Consequence of Sound said McCarter had "a unique blend of cheery funk and soulful R&B, saved from the whimsical confines of nostalgia by a jaw dropping, awe-inspiring physical performance that would give Nigel Lythgoe a hernia." PopMatters declared the group "the best new live band in America" upon seeing the set.

=== Paradise (2016–present) ===
After completing their tour of the U.S. and Europe, the band replaced Dubreuil with Patrick Monaco Glynn and began work on their first full-length album, titled Paradise. The 12-track album, produced by Mario Caldato Jr., features McCarter and company addressing life in modern society, including the struggles of inequality ("Hard Times"), capitalism ("Money"), and the Black Lives Matter movement ("Free & Brave"). "Free & Brave" includes references to Martin Luther King Jr. and Trayvon Martin. The band toured throughout the country and the world, stopping at major festivals like Lollapalooza and Bonnaroo.

== Band members ==
=== Full members ===
- Sarah Clarke – vocals
- Benjamin Andrews – guitar
- Jonathan Kirchner – bass
- Andrew Laubacher – drums
- Patrick Monaco Glynn – keyboard
- Marcus Stephens – saxophone, woodwinds
- Brendan Liu – trumpet

== Discography ==
=== Extended plays ===
- Kiss the Sun (2015)

=== Albums ===
- From The Hip (2010)
- Paradise (2016)
- Explorer (2018)
