= Mud Morganfield =

American blues singer

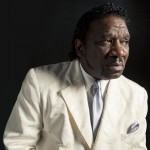

Background information
- Born: Larry Williams; September 27, 1954 (age 72); Chicago, Illinois, U.S.
- Genre: Blues
- Occupation: Musician
- Instruments: Vocals, bass guitar
- Labels: Delmark, Nola Blue Records
- Website: https://mudmorganfieldblues.com/

Larry "Mud" Morganfield (born September 27, 1954) is an American blues singer. He is the eldest son of Muddy Waters and the half-brother of Big Bill Morganfield.

== Early life ==
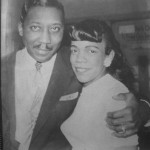
Morganfield's parents

Morganfield was born to McKinley Morganfield (Muddy Waters) and Mildred Williams in Chicago. He was raised by his mother and seven uncles, with occasional visits from Muddy, and never really got to know his father.

Regarding his childhood in Chicago, Morganfield says, "I didn’t have the pleasure of getting up and walking down the lakefront and watching the ocean and the lakes or something. I came up and there was gunshots and someone may have gotten hit down the street. I mean, I’ve seen the drunks, the drugs, and I tell you again, I can’t forget these things because it makes up who I am today. It makes me the man I am today."

Despite growing up surrounded by music, Morganfield did not consider becoming a professional musician until after his father's death in 1983. At that time, Morganfield was driving trucks for a living, but the strain was wearing on him. He suggested that a recurring dream of Muddy Waters performing on stage helped prompt him to begin performing the blues professionally.

== Career ==
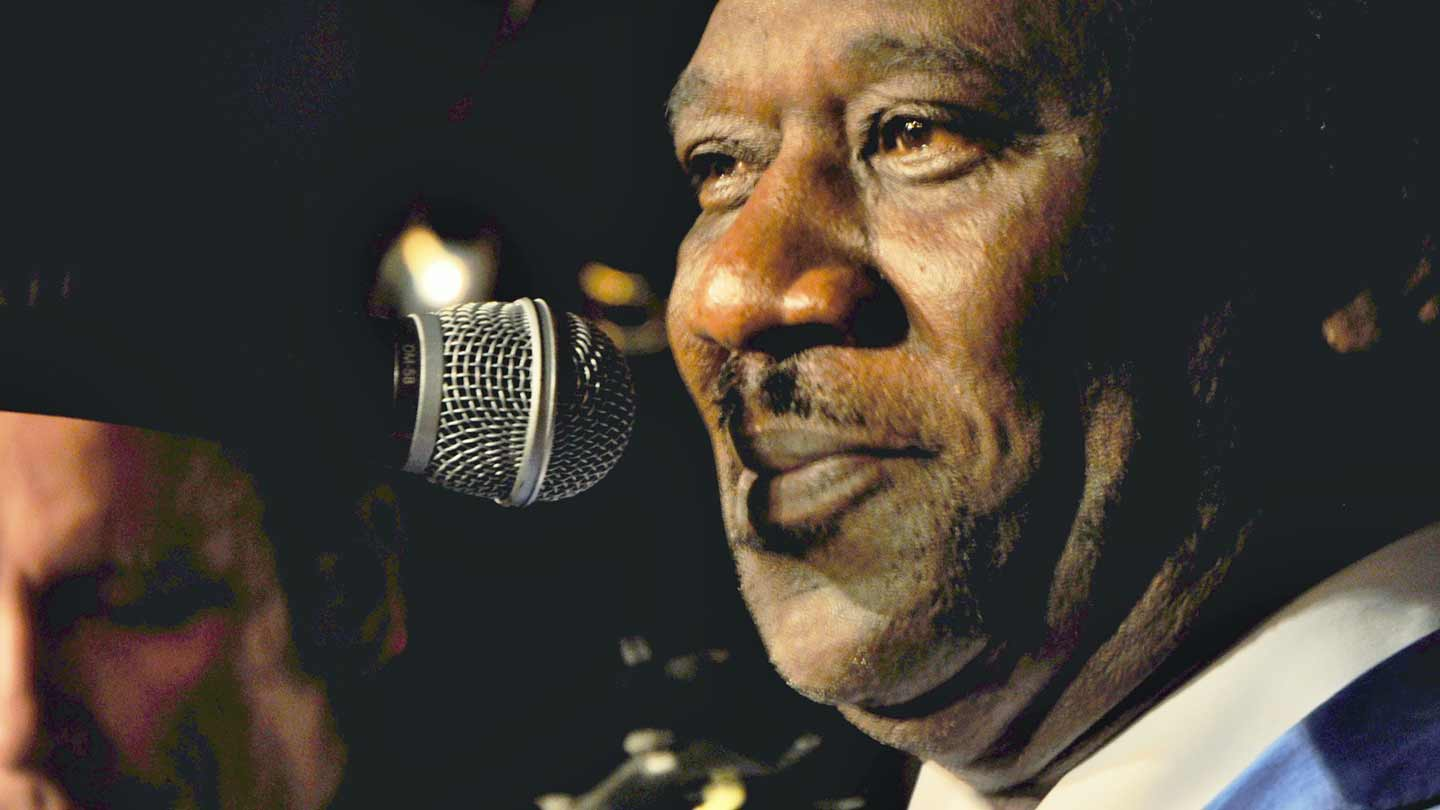
Larry "Mud" Morganfield

Morganfield has described the resemblance of the tone and timbre of his voice to that of his father's voice as a double-edged sword.

Morganfield launched his music career in blues clubs on the south side of Chicago, where he performed a mix of his father's material and his own original works. Regarding his performances of Muddy Waters songs in addition to his own material, Morganfield says, "I started to sing to show the world that dad left me here. I love and am proud to sing his songs just like I love and will always be proud of him. I'm not Muddy Waters and I'm certainly not trying to be Muddy Waters. I'm Mud Morganfield, but when I'm up on stage I always feel Pops is there with me and it means so much that I can get on stage and keep his music alive around the world."

In May 2015, his album, For Pops: A Tribute To Muddy Waters, won a Blues Music Award in the 'Traditional Blues Album' category.

== Discography ==
- Fall Waters Fall (Morganfield Productions, 2008)
- Son of a Seventh Son (Severn, 2012)
- For Pops: A Tribute to Muddy Waters with Kim Wilson (Severn, 2014)
- They Call Me Mud (Severn, 2018)
- Portrait (Delmark, 2022)
- Deep Mud with Studebaker John (Nola Blue, 2025)
