= Fiona Boyes =

Australian blues musician

- Origin: Australia
- Genre: Blues
- Occupations: Musician
- Instruments: Guitar, vocals
- Years active: 1980s–present
- Labels: Yellow Dog Records, Blue Empress Records
- Website: www.fionaboyes.com

Fiona Boyes is an Australian blues musician. She has been recording for more than 25 years and tours regularly in Australia, the United States, and Europe. She was part of the Australian female Blues band, The Mojo's, in the 1990s alongside Annie Packer, Gina Woods, Kaz Dalla Rosa and Paula Dowes. Boyes released her debut studio album, Blues in My Heart in 2000. In 2003, she won the solo/duo category at the International Blues Challenge in Memphis, Tennessee.

Boyes' debut US release Lucky 13 was nominated by the Blues Foundation in Memphis, Tennessee for the 2007 Blues Music Awards, 'Contemporary Blues Album of the Year'. She has since received three further BMA nominations for 'Traditional Female Blues Artist' (2010), 'Acoustic BluesAlbum of the Year' (2009), 'Contemporary Female Blues Artist' (2008), and her 2008 release Live From Bluesville won the US Blues Critics Award for Best Live Blues Album. Boyes has also received 15 national recording and performance awards in Australia.

Boyes has toured and recorded with many, including Hubert Sumlin and Bob Margolin. Boyes was described by Grammy Award winner and Blues Hall of Fame pianist, Pinetop Perkins, as "the best gal guitarist I heard since Memphis Minnie". She plays both acoustic and electric, covering pre-war Delta slide, laments, single chord Mississippi Hills grooves, Piedmont finger picking, New Orleans barrelhouse, Memphis soul, classic Chicago, Texas swing, and the uptown sound of the West Coast.

== Discography ==
List of albums, with selected details
Title	Details
Blues in My Heart	Released: 2000; Format: CD; Label: Black Market Music (BMM239-2)
Gimme Some... Sweet Jelly Roll	Released: 2003; Format: CD; Label: Black Market Music (BMM271-2)
Live in Atlanta (as Fiona Boyes & The Fortune Tellers)	Released: 2004; Format: CD; Label: Blue Empress Records (BE-201)
Lucky 13 (as Fiona Boyes & The Fortune Tellers)	Released: 2006; Format: CD; Label: Yellow Dog Records (YLDG 1353)
Live from Bluesville (with Mookie Brill & Rich DelGrosso)	Released: 2008; Format: CD; Label: Blue Empress Records (BE-205)
Blues Woman	Released: 2008 (US); Format: CD; Label: Yellow Dog Records (YLDG 216532)
Blues for Hard Times	Released: 2011; Format: CD; Label: Blue Empress Records (BER 206)
Box & Dice	Released: October 2015; Format: CD; Label: Blue Empress Records (BER 207)
Professin' The Blues	Released: October 2016; Format: CD, 2×LP; Label: Reference Recordings (RR-140) / Blue Empress Records (BER 208)
Voodoo in the Shadows	Released: 2018; Format: CD, LP; Label: Blue Empress Records (BER-209)
Ramblified	Released: 2023; Format: CD, Digital; Label: Blue Empress Records

== Awards and nominations ==
=== Music Victoria Awards ===
The Music Victoria Awards are an annual awards night celebrating Victorian music. They commenced in 2006.

Year	Nominee / work	Award	Result	Ref.
Music Victoria Awards of 2015	Box & Dice	Best Blues Album	Nominated	
Music Victoria Awards of 2017	Professin' the Blues	Best Blues Album	Won	
Music Victoria Awards of 2018	Voodoo in the Shadows	Best Blues Album	Nominated	
