= Glenn Skuthorpe =

Glenn Skuthorpe is an indigenous Australian country musician from Goodooga, New South Wales. His indigenous heritage is Nhunggabarra, Kooma and Muruwari and his musical influences include Hank Williams, Tex Morton and Archie Roach. He has released six albums independently, including Out of the Darkness (2001), Restless Souls (2004), See My World (2017) and Wild Winds of Dooga (2018). His songs have featured on compilations such as Fresh Salt (2002), Home (2013), Buried Country (2014) and in films including Emu Runner (2018) and John Pilger's documentary, Utopia. Skuthorpe is a regular performer on the Australian country music festival circuit and tours extensively from his home in South Australia.
