= Eugene Bridges =

American singer and musician (born 1963)

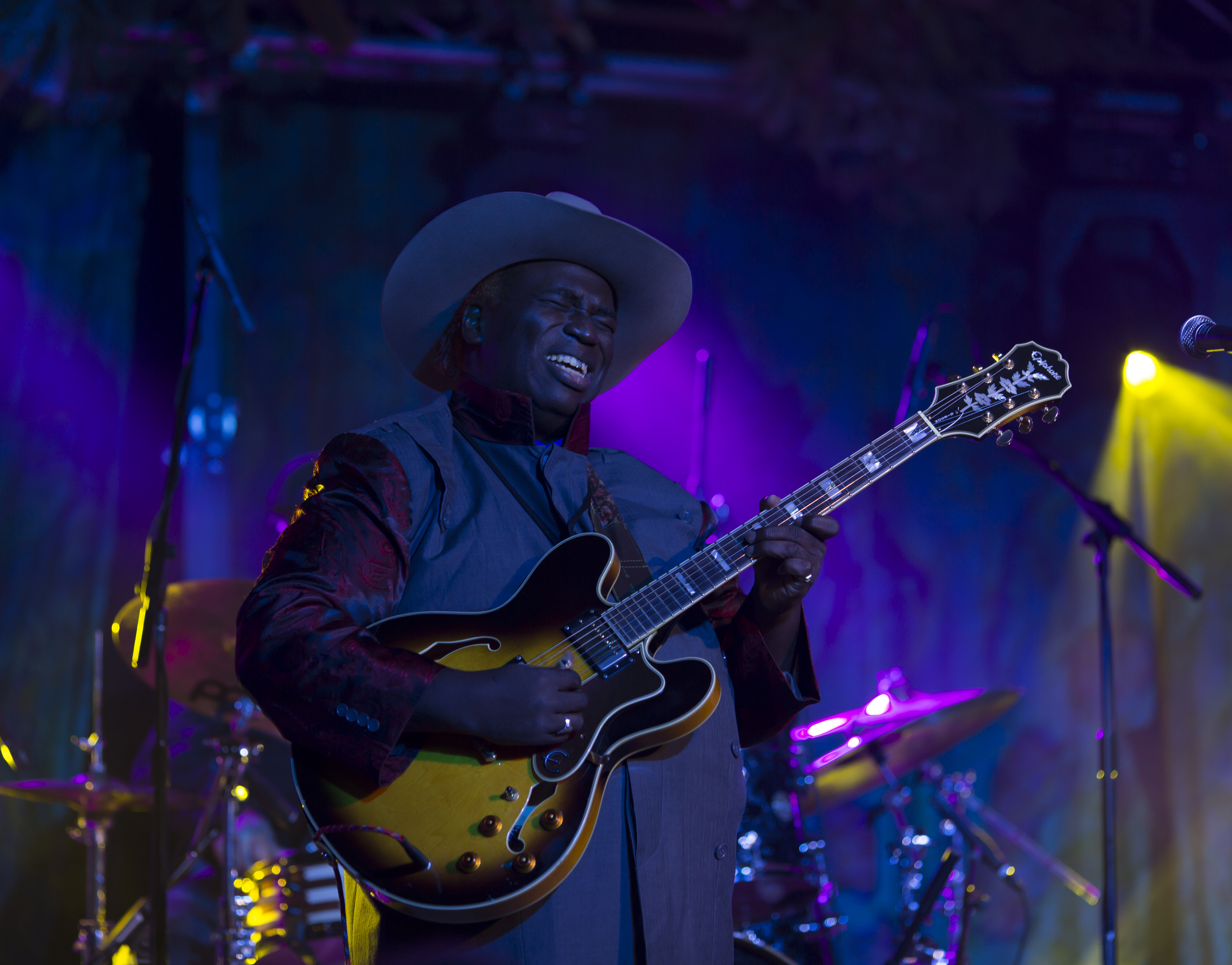
Eugene Bridges, Kidgeeridge Music Festival, May 2015

Eugene Bridges (born March 30, 1963), usually credited as Eugene "Hideaway" Bridges, is an American blues and soul singer, songwriter, guitarist, and bandleader who has released seven albums and has performed widely in the US, Asia, Europe, Australia, and New Zealand.

== Biography ==
He was born in New Orleans, the fourth of five children, and was raised in Amite, Louisiana. His father, Otheneil Bridges Sr., performed as a blues guitarist under the name "Hideaway Slim", and his mother, Mary Elizabeth Bullock, was a cousin of Anna Mae Bullock, better known as Tina Turner, which makes her his first cousin once removed. In his early teens, Eugene Bridges began singing with his brothers as a gospel group, The Bridges Brothers, and also formed his own R&B band, The Five Stars. At the age of 16 he moved to Texas to join the US Air Force, and played in an Air Force band for three years. After leaving the service, he joined a gospel group, The New Chosen, on guitar and vocals, and then joined the Mighty Clouds of Joy. He then moved to live in Houston, where he joined the police force and formed his own band, the Eugene "Hideaway" Bridges Band, and started touring in the US.

In the mid-1990s he travelled alone to Europe, and was seen in Paris by B.B. King's bass player Joe Turner, who recruited him to play in his own band, Big Joe Turner's Memphis Blues Caravan. After a year in Turner's band, Bridges then formed a new version of the Eugene "Hideaway" Bridges Band, and began performing in clubs and festivals mainly in the UK and Europe. In 1998 and 1999, he topped British and European blues magazine polls as best male vocalist. He released his first album, Born To Be Blue, produced by Mike Vernon, on the Blueside label in 1998. The following year he was signed by British blues label Armadillo, and he released a series of albums for them starting with Man Without A Home (2000), and Jump the Joint (2003), which reached the US Living Blues charts and was nominated for awards.

He has continued to tour internationally, and has developed followings through his performances across Europe and in Australia and New Zealand. His later albums have been Coming Home (2005), Eugene Hideaway Bridges (2007), Live In San Antonio (2009), and Rock and a Hard Place (2011), the last of which was recorded with a full horn section. He is described at Allmusic as "a vibrant and enthusiastic singer and guitarist... [who] brings fire and intensity to contemporary blues, which he laces with hints of his gospel singing past." Most recently he performed at the Gumball Festival in NSW, Australia, during his 30th visit to Australia.
