= Claude Hay (musician) =

Australian musician

- Origin: Katoomba, New South Wales, Australia
- Genres: Rock, Groove, Funk
- Years active: 2007–present
- Website: www.claudehay.com.au

Claude Hay is a songwriter, singer and multi instrumentalist from Australia. His current main act is the 3-piece rock-groove band Claude Hay and the Kung Fu Mustard. He steered away from the blues scene after the pandemic to go in the direction of rock-groove-funk direction, harking back to his original love of 80's and 90's rock music. Album due out 2024.

== History ==
For over a decade Claude Hay as known as a solo blues/roots. He employed a technique using looping pedals to sample and layer musical phrases using multiple instruments, including guitar, bass, sitar and electronic drums, creating the effect of being an entire band although he is typically the lone performer on his recordings and on stage.

== Overview ==
Hay's debut album, Kiss the Sky, was released in 2007. This effort was well received in Hay's home country of Australia, allowing him the opportunity to be the opening act for other popular Australian roots acts Ash Grunwald, The Fumes, Chase the Sun and Dallas Frasca. He ultimately traveled to and performed in the United States, the UK, Denmark, and Germany over several months in 2008.

In 2010, Hay released Deep Fried Satisfied, his second full-length album. The album was released independently in Australia, and on the North Carolina, U.S.-based label Ingot Rock for all other territories. The response from critics was strong: Exclaim! writer Kerry Doole called the album, "one of the most entertaining blues-rock albums of the year." The album was also given 5 out of 5 Stars from Cashbox Magazine and received positive reviews in the Seattle, Washington Post-Intelligencer, the Tuscaloosa, Alabama, Planet Weekly, The Folk and Acoustic Music Exchange, and the Charleston, South Carolina, Post and Courier, with music critic Devin Grant writing, "This is definitely one instance where the album's title accurately reflects the feeling you'll get while listening." Deep Fried Satisfied also did well on the charts, reaching #21 for Blues airplay worldwide and #1 in Australia on the Roots Music Report.

Hay also appeared on NPR's Weekend Edition in November 2010, and later that month made his debut on the top ten of the Billboard Blues chart, reaching #9.

Following a tour to the U.S. in 2011 and then France, Hay returned home to Australia to write and record his third studio album, I Love Hate You, which was independently released in Australia on 21 September 2012, and released worldwide on 16 October 2012 by the U.S. label 128 Records. For the first time Hay uses other players. Bass player Ryan Van Gennip and drummer Jon Howell from the Sydney band Chase the Sun are featured on "Turn It Up", and Howell plays drums on "Good Times". Cello accompaniment is also featured in "Close".

Hay won the Best Male Vocalist Award at the Australian Blues Music Chain Awards in 2013

== Discography ==
=== Albums ===
- Kiss the Sky (2007 - Independent)
- Deep Fried Satisfied (2010 - Ingot Rock)
- I Love Hate You (2012 - Independent (Australia), 128 Records (Rest of World))
- Rollercoaster (2016)
