= Modus Operandi (Jimmy Barnes album) =

Live album by Jimmy Barnes
- Released: 29 November 2019
- Recorded: 5 October 2019
- Studios: Hordern Pavilion, Sydney
- Label: Bloodlines
- Producer: Kevin Shirley

Jimmy Barnes chronology
My Criminal Record (2019)	Modus Operandi (2019)	Flesh and Blood (2021)

Modus Operandi (subtitled Live at the Hordern 2019) is a live album by Australian musician Jimmy Barnes.

== Background ==
The album was recorded at the Hordern Pavilion in Sydney on 5 October 2019, during the Shutting Down Your Town tour, in promotion of Barnes' 17th studio and ARIA number-one album, My Criminal Record.

== Description ==
Modus Operandi features 7 songs from My Criminal Record alongside Barnes' live concert staples. The album was recorded with Barnes' core touring band of Danny Spencer, Ben Rodgers, Clayton Doley, and his son Jackie Barnes, plus Michael Hegerty, Lachlan Doley, and family/band members Jane, Mahalia, EJ, and Elly-May Barnes.

Barnes said "This tour has meant a lot to me. It's really the climax of nearly a decade spent confronting my demons and using words and music to come to terms with them. At all of these shows I can feel the audience picking me up and putting me on their shoulders, so I wanted to release one of the shows from this memorable tour to say thanks to everyone who was there, and to let everyone else know what they missed."

For a limited time, the album came as a double album, including My Criminal Record.

== Track listing ==
CD1 (My Criminal Record)

1. "My Criminal Record" (Jimmy Barnes, Don Walker)
2. "Shutting Down Our Town" (Troy Cassar-Daley)
3. "I'm in a Bad Mood" (Barnes, Walker)
4. "Stolen Car (The Road's on Fire, Pt. 1)" (Barnes, Walker)
5. "My Demon (God Help Me)" (Barnes, Cassar-Daley, Ben Rodgers)
6. "Working Class Hero" (John Lennon)
7. "Belvedere and Cigarettes" (Harley Webster, Jade MacRae, Rodgers)
8. "I Won't Let You Down" (Chris Cheney)
9. "Stargazer" (Barnes, Walker)
10. "Money and Class" (Barnes, Walker, Rodgers)
11. "Stolen Car (The Road's on Fire, Pt. 2)" (Barnes, Walker)
12. "If Time Is on My Side" (Mark Lizotte)
13. "Tougher Than the Rest" (Bruce Springsteen)

CD2 (Modus Operandi)

1. "Driving Wheels"
2. "I'm in a Bad Mood"
3. "Stolen Car (The Road's on Fire)"
4. "Ride the Night Away"
5. "Khe Sanh"
6. "My Criminal Record"
7. "Lay Down Your Guns"
8. "Boys Cry Out for War"
9. "Money and Class"
10. "Working Class Hero"
11. "I Won't Let You Down"
12. "Shutting Down Our Town"
13. "I'd Die to Be with You Tonight"
14. "No Second Prize"
15. "Working Class Man"
16. "Love and Hate"
17. "Goodbye (Astrid Goodbye)"

== Charts ==
Chart (2019)	Peak position
Australian Albums (ARIA)	48

== Release history ==
Region	Date	Format	Label	Catalogue
Australia	29 November 2019	2×CD, streaming, digital download	Bloodlines	BLOOD70
