= Flesh and Blood (Jimmy Barnes album) =

Studio album by Jimmy Barnes
- Released: 2 July 2021
- Recorded: 2020
- Studios: Freight Train (Sydney); Apple Street (Berrima)
- Length: 45:02
- Label: Bloodlines
- Producer: Kevin Shirley

Jimmy Barnes chronology
Modus Operandi (2019)	Flesh and Blood (2021)	Soul Deep 30 (2022)

Singles from Flesh and Blood
- 1. "Flesh and Blood" Released: 25 March 2021; 2. "'Til The Next Time" Released: 2 June 2021; 3. "Gateway To Your Heart" Released: 24 June 2021; 4. "Around in Circles" Released: 2 July 2021

Flesh and Blood is the nineteenth studio album by Scottish Australian musician Jimmy Barnes, released on 2 July 2021 through Bloodlines. The album was announced on 25 March and features production from Barnes' long-time collaborator Kevin Shirley. Barnes wrote most of the record while in the peak of the COVID-19 lockdown restrictions in 2020.

The album debuted atop of the ARIA Chart; becoming Barnes' 13th number 1 album and extending his record as the artist with the most number 1 albums.

At the AIR Awards of 2022, the album was nominated for Best Independent Rock Album or EP.

== Singles ==
The title track was released on 25 March 2021 as the album's lead single. Barnes premiered the song at Michael Gudinski's state funeral on 24 March, at the request of Gudinski's son Matt. Barnes said "It's about the unbreakable bonds that bind us to our families through all of life's ups and the downs. Without Jane, my kids and grandkids I wouldn't be here today. The song has taken on an extra meaning for our family since Michael's passing. When I say he was a brother to me, I mean that in every sense. We could drive each other nuts sometimes but there was always a deep and loving connection there. I was so excited when I played the single to Michael. He was really pumped about it and we were both really looking forward to sharing this new record together."

"Til the Next Time" was released digitally on 2 June 2021, as the second single.

On 24 June 2021, "Gateway to Your Heart" was released as the album's third single. Barnes said "This one's about the truth being the most important thing in relationships and also might be the gateway to heart."

The album's fourth single, "Around in Circles" was released on 2 July 2021. Barnes said it is "about trying to make sense of all the bad things that you've done."

== Reception ==
Professional ratings
Review scores
Source	Rating
The Australian	4/5 stars

The Australian said "Flesh and Blood is warm, assured and sounds like Barnes is spending his 65th year in a state of grace."

Jeff Jenkins from Stack Magazine said "'This Is The Truth' – the centrepiece of this record – puts the focus on his undeniable vocal, filled with heart and emotion, and the Jimmy Webb-like 'Til the Next Time' shows he's a fine storyteller as well.

== Commercial performance ==
On 9 July 2021, Barnes made history by achieving his 13th ARIA number 1 album and extending his lead over Madonna and U2 as the artist with the most ARIA number 1 albums, both of whom have 11 chart-toppers. The debut also means Barnes has achieved an ARIA number 1 across five decades (1980s to 2020s).

In a statement, Barnes said:

"I don't take any of this for granted. Firstly, I'd like to thank all the people who are still willing to listen to my new music after all these years. I hope they get as much pleasure from listening to it as I get from making it. I'm also deeply grateful to Warren and the whole staff at Bloodlines and the Mushroom Group. Michael loved to call them 'the A Team' and they've certainly shown that yet again with all their hard work promoting Flesh and Blood. I also want to thank my brother-in-law Mark Lizotte for writing most of the songs on the album with me and, lastly, I'd like to thank my Jane and our beautiful family for continuing to inspire me, and for being such a huge part of this record".

== Track listing ==
Standard tracks

1. "Flesh and Blood" (Jimmy Barnes, Mark Lizotte) – 5:27
2. "I'm Coming Home" (Jimmy Barnes, Lizotte) – 3:16
3. "Gateway to Your Heart" (Jimmy Barnes, Lizotte) – 4:46
4. "This is The Truth" (Don Walker) – 4:05
5. "Around in Circles" (Jimmy Barnes, Lizotte) – 4:28
6. "'Til the Next Time" (Jimmy Barnes, Lizotte) – 4:45
7. "I Move Slow" - featuring Elly-May Barnes and Jackie Barnes (Alys Edwards, Jackie Barnes) – 5:23
8. "End of the Road" (Jimmy Barnes, Lizotte) – 4:52
9. "Love Hurts" - featuring Jane Barnes (Boudleaux Bryant) – 4:05
10. "Tennessee Waltz" - featuring Eliza Jane Barnes (Pee Wee King, Redd Stewart) – 3:55

Deluxe edition bonus DVD The bonus DVD features 10 home performance videos by Jimmy and Jane Barnes, along with their family and friends, filmed throughout the pandemic.

1. "Hello, Dolly!" (featuring David Campbell)
2. "The Skye Boat Song"
3. "Stardust"
4. "The Rose"
5. "Dirty Old Town" (featuring Diesel)
6. "Bridge Over Troubled Water" (featuring Mahalia Barnes, David Campbell, Gary Pinto & Benjamin Rodgers)
7. "Mull of Kintyre" (featuring Eliza Barnes, Jimmy Metherell, Darren Percival, Mahalia Barnes & Benjamin Rodgers)
8. "California Dreamin'" (featuring Jackie Barnes)
9. "Take Me Home, Country Roads" (featuring Elly-May Barnes, Clayton Doley & Mahalia Barnes)
10. "A Pub With No Beer"

== Personnel ==
Musicians

- Jimmy Barnes – vocals
- Mahalia Barnes – backing vocals
- Juanita Tippins – backing vocals
- Prinnie Stevens – backing vocals
- Tyra Harrison – backing vocals
- Daniel Wayne Spencer – guitar
- Benjamin Rodgers – bass guitar
- Clayton Doley – piano, organ
- Jackie Barnes – drums, percussion (all tracks); vocals (track 7)
- Douglas McFarland – bagpipes
- Russ Pahl – pedal steel
- Elly-May Barnes – vocals (track 7)
- Lachlan Doley – piano (track 8)
- Bobby Summerfield – bells (track 8)
- Jane Barnes – vocals (track 9)
- EJ Barnes – vocals (track 10)

Technical

- Kevin Shirley – production, mixing
- Bob Ludwig – mastering
- Benjamin Rodgers – recording
- Tyra Harrison – recording assistance

Visuals

- Benjamin Rodgers – cover photo, back photo, black & white photos
- Robert Hambling – black & white photos
- Jarrad Seng – black & white photos
- Jimmy Metherell – black & white photos
- Tom Fletcher – black & white photos
- Samantha McFadden – design

== Charts ==
=== Weekly charts ===
Weekly chart performance for Flesh and Blood
Chart (2021)	Peak position
Australian Albums (ARIA)	1
New Zealand Albums (RMNZ)	6

=== Year-end charts ===
Year-end chart performance for Flesh and Blood
Chart (2021)	Position
Australian Albums (ARIA)	83

== Release history ==
Release history and formats for Flesh and Blood
Region	Date	Format	Label	Catalogue
Australia	2 July 2021	CD	Bloodlines	BLOOD87
Australia	2 July 2021	CD+DVD	Bloodlines	BLOOD87X
Australia	2 July 2021	Vinyl	Bloodlines	BLOODLP707
