= Working Class Boy =

Working Class Boy may refer to:

- Working Class Boy (memoir), a 2016 memoir by Australian rock singer Jimmy Barnes
- Working Class Boy (film), a 2018 documentary based on the memoir of the same name
- Working Class Boy (soundtrack), the soundtrack album of the 2018 film
