= Soul Searchin' (Jimmy Barnes album) =

Studio album by Jimmy Barnes
- Released: 3 June 2016
- Recorded: 2015
- Studio: Grand Victor Sound (Nashville, Tennessee)
- Genre: Rock, soul
- Label: Liberation Music

Jimmy Barnes chronology
Best of the Soul Years (2015)	Soul Searchin' (2016)	Och Aye the G'nu (2017)

Soul Searchin' is the 16th studio album by Australian singer-songwriter, Jimmy Barnes. The album is Barnes' fourth album of soul and R&B classics following Soul Deep (1991), Soul Deeper... Songs from the Deep South (2000), and The Rhythm and the Blues (2009). The album was announced on 8 May 2016, alongside a one-hour documentary that aired on the Nine Network in June and a national tour that commenced in August. The album was released on 3 June 2016.

The Soul Searchin' documentary followed Barnes to America's south on a discovery of lost soul gems and the musicians who made them and visit the places that inspired them. Barnes said, "The idea was to find more obscure soul songs that people may not have heard – the diamonds in the rough. I was just looking and looking for songs that for one reason or another were skipped over or they were too hard for radio or the singer was cross-eyed – for whatever reason, these songs were missed. I can't wait to get to sing these songs again when I take them on tour. It will be wild."

== Reviews ==
Jeff Apter of Rolling Stone Australia gave the album 3 out of 4 saying; "Barnesy keeps his angry bird squawk in check for much of the album; his voice has rarely sounded better, or more controlled."

Collin Morris from Stuff NZ gave the album 4 out of 5 saying; "Here we have Barnes searching and finding many less-known gems and imbuing them with a real sense of what soul is about."

== Track listing ==
CD/download/vinyl

1. "She's Looking Good"
2. "Hard Working Woman"
3. "A Woman Needs to Be Loved"
4. "Cry to Me"
5. "If Loving You Is a Crime (I'll Always Be Guilty)" (with The Memphis Boys)
6. "It's How You Make It Good"
7. "I Worship the Ground You Walk On" (featuring Steve Cropper)
8. "Bad Girl"
9. "Lonely for You Baby"
10. "The Dark End of the Street" (featuring Dan Penn)
11. "Mercy Mercy"
12. "Rainbow Road"

Deluxe edition
13. "I Testify"
14. "Mustang Sally"
15. "More and More" (with The Memphis Boys)
16. "Drowning in the Sea of Love"
17. "In the Midnight Hour"
18. "In a Broken Dream" (featuring Joe Bonamassa)
19. "You've Got My Mind Messed Up" (with The Memphis Boys)
20. "Suspicious Minds" (with The Memphis Boys)

== Charts ==
Soul Searchin' debuted at number one in Australia for the week commencing 13 June 2016, thus becoming Barnes' 11th number one album. 11 number one albums is the most for a local artist, and the equal second-best (with Madonna and U2) of all time behind The Beatles at 14.

=== Weekly charts ===
Chart (2016)	Peak position
Australian Albums (ARIA)	1
New Zealand Heatseekers Albums (RMNZ)	4

=== Year-end charts ===
Chart (2016)	Position
Australian Albums (ARIA)	58

== See also ==
- List of number-one albums of 2016 (Australia)

== Release history ==
Region	Date	Format	Label	Catalogue
Australia	3 June 2016	CD; digital download; vinyl	Liberation Music	LMLP0295
