= Best of the Soul Years =

Greatest hits album by Jimmy Barnes
- Released: 14 August 2015
- Recorded: 1990–2015
- Genre: Rock, soul
- Label: Liberation Music

Jimmy Barnes chronology
30:30 Hindsight (2014)	Best of the Soul Years (2015)	Soul Searchin' (2016)

Best of the Soul Years is a 2015 compilation album by Australian singer-songwriter, Jimmy Barnes. The album is compiled from his three platinum-selling albums of soul and R&B classics; Soul Deep (1991), Soul Deeper... Songs from the Deep South (2000) and The Rhythm and the Blues (2009). The album also includes two new recordings, "In the Midnight Hour" and "Mustang Sally". The album was released in Australia on 14 August 2015 and peaked at number 3.

== Track listing ==
CD (Disc 1)/Digital download

1. "River Deep – Mountain High"
2. "I Gotcha"
3. "In the Midnight Hour"
4. "(Your Love Keeps Lifting Me) Higher and Higher"
5. "Land of 1000 Dances"
6. "Mustang Sally"
7. "Chain of Fools"
8. "Red Hot"
9. "Hallelujah I Love Her So"
10. "Hold On, I'm Comin'"
11. "Shake, Rattle and Roll"
12. "What Becomes of the Broken Hearted"
13. "Signed, Sealed, Delivered I'm Yours"
14. "Ain't No Mountain High Enough"
15. "When Something Is Wrong with My Baby" (with John Farnham)
16. "Reflections"

DVD (Disc 2)

1. "(Your Love Keeps Lifting Me) Higher and Higher" (live performance at The Palais)
2. "River Deep – Mountain High" (live performance at The Palais)
3. "In the Midnight Hour" (live performance at The Palais)
4. "Land of 1000 Dances" (music video)
5. "Mustang Sally" (music video)
6. "Chain of Fools" (music video)
7. "Red Hot" (music video)
8. "Hallelujah I Love Her So" (music video)
9. "Shake Rattle and Roll" (music video)
10. "Hold On, I'm Comin'" (live performance at The Basement)
11. "What Becomes of the Broken Hearted" (live performance at The Basement)
12. "Signed, Sealed, Delivered I'm Yours" (live performance at The Palais)
13. "Ain't No Mountain High Enough" (music video)
14. "When Something Is Wrong with My Baby" (music video)
15. "In the Midnight Hour" (music video)

== Charts ==
Chart (2015)	Peak position
Australian Albums (ARIA)	3

== Certifications ==
Region	Certification	Certified units/sales
Australia (ARIA)	Gold	35,000^{^}
^{^} Shipments figures based on certification alone.
