= My Criminal Record =

Studio album by Jimmy Barnes
- Released: 31 May 2019
- Label: Bloodlines

Jimmy Barnes chronology
Working Class Boy (2018)	My Criminal Record (2019)	Modus Operandi (2019)

Singles from My Criminal Record
- 1. "My Criminal Record" Released: 25 January 2019; 2. "Shutting Down Our Town" Released: 26 April 2019; 3. "I Won't Let You Down" Released: 6 September 2019

My Criminal Record is the 18th studio album by Australian musician Jimmy Barnes. The album was released on 31 May 2019. The album is Barnes' first solo album of primarily original material since 2010's Rage and Ruin. It became Barnes's 12th number-one album on the Australian albums chart, making him the artist with the most chart-topping albums in Australian chart history, having previously tied at 11 number ones with Madonna and U2.

At the ARIA Music Awards of 2019, the album was nominated for Best Rock Album.

== Background and release ==
In 2015, Barnes began writing with longtime collaborator Don Walker for Cold Chisel's follow-up to The Perfect Crime released in 2015. In 2016 Barnes released the autobiography Working Class Boy and the sequel Working Class Man in 2017 which led to a documentary film titled Working Class Boy chronicling his life; thus renewing an interest in Barnes' life and career. Barnes told the Newcastle Herald writing and speaking about his life had also energised his songwriting some 40 years into his career. "It's certainly opened up a whole new avenue for songwriting in terms of different emotions, different ways of looking back at my life. Writing those books - as much as they connected with other people - for me, there was a lot of stuff that was blocking me that I tried to not deal with as I grew up. Dealing with them in the book has loosened me up and freed me up so I can write about other things and move on."

Barnes scheduled two in-store album signing days to support the release; one in Melbourne on 1 June and one in Adelaide on 2 June.

== Reception ==
Professional ratings
Review scores
Source	Rating
The AU Review	4/5 stars
The Herald	3.5/5 stars

Bernard Zuel from The Guardian said "The singer continues to lay himself bare in a new album which touches on the same raw, frank themes as his memoirs." calling "My Criminal Record, a collection of blues-based rock that carries with it a solid thump at all times". Josh Leason from The Newcastle Herald called the album "a passionate return for Australia's working class hero." Jeff Jenkins from JB Hi-Fi said "This album... shows that what Barnesy does best is sing. His vocal is a booming beast, an instrument that remains, amazingly, in great shape, still able to switch effortlessly from screaming to soulful" calling the album "one of the best records of his remarkable career."

== Singles ==
The title track was released on 25 January 2019 as the album's lead single. The Guardian said, "Listening to the familiar downtempo blues bar piano, and the dark chord progression, it's not surprising to see Cold Chisel impresario Don Walker's name alongside Barnes' on the songwriting credits, and this sits alongside their finest collaborations."

On 26 April 2019, "Shutting Down Our Town" was released as the album's second single.

On 6 September 2019, "I Won't Let You Down" was released as the album's third single.

== Track listing ==
1. "My Criminal Record" (Jimmy Barnes, Don Walker)
2. "Shutting Down Our Town" (Troy Cassar-Daley)
3. "I'm in a Bad Mood" (Barnes, Walker)
4. "Stolen Car (The Road's on Fire, Pt. 1)" (Barnes, Walker)
5. "My Demon (God Help Me)" (Barnes, Cassar-Daley, Ben Rodgers)
6. "Working Class Hero" (John Lennon)
7. "Belvedere and Cigarettes" (Harley Webster, Jade MacRae, Rodgers)
8. "I Won't Let You Down" (Chris Cheney)
9. "Stargazer" (Barnes, Walker)
10. "Money and Class" (Barnes, Walker, Rodgers)
11. "Stolen Car (The Road's on Fire, Pt. 2)" (Barnes, Walker)
12. "If Time Is on My Side" (Mark Lizotte)
13. "Tougher Than the Rest" (Bruce Springsteen)

Deluxe edition bonus tracks:

14. "Reckless Beauty"
15. "Waitin' on a Plane"
16. "Tougher Than the Rest" (Alternate Mix)
17. "I'm in a Bad Mood" (Bob Clearmountain Mix)

== Charts ==
=== Weekly charts ===
Chart (2019)	Peak position
Australian Albums (ARIA)	1
New Zealand Albums (RMNZ)	3

=== Year-end charts ===
Chart (2019)	Position
Australian Albums (ARIA)	36

== See also ==
- List of number-one albums of 2019 (Australia)

== Release history ==
Region	Date	Format	Label	Catalogue
Australia	31 May 2019	CD	Bloodlines	BLOOD50
Australia	31 May 2019	Vinyl	Bloodlines	BLOODLP50
