= Out in the Blue =

Studio album by Jimmy Barnes
- Released: 24 November 2007
- Genre: Rock / Country
- Length: 47:45
- Label: Liberation Music
- Producer: Nash Chambers

Jimmy Barnes chronology
Double Happiness (2005)	Out in the Blue (2007)	The Rhythm and the Blues (2009)

Out in the Blue is the twelfth studio album by Australian singer Jimmy Barnes. It was released on 24 November 2007 as both a single-disc and limited double-disc edition.

== Description ==
Out in the Blue is predominantly a rootsy acoustic rock album, but also contains elements of rockabilly and country. The majority of the songs on the album were written by Barnes, many of them in relation to his recent heart surgery. Neil Finn contributed the track "Blue Hotel" and Kasey Chambers performs a duet on "When Two Hearts Collide". Jim Moginie of Midnight Oil also appears on the album, along with Mark Punch, Chris Haigh, and Barnes' four children Mahalia, EJ, Jackie, and Elly-May. Produced by Nash Chambers at Barnes' own studio Freight Train Studios, it was released on 24 November 2007.

== Track listing ==
=== Out in the Blue ===
Tracks on Out in the Blue are:

1. "I Can't Tell You Why" (Jimmy Barnes) – 3:38
2. "Out in the Blue" (Jimmy Barnes) – 4:47
3. "You From Me" (Jimmy Barnes) – 3:37
4. "Blue Hotel" (Neil Finn) – 4:15
5. "When Two Hearts Collide" (with Kasey Chambers) (Jimmy Barnes) – 3:49
6. "Red Light" (Jimmy Barnes, Nick Barker) – 4:54
7. "Everything Is Changing" (Jimmy Barnes, EJ Barnes) – 4:08
8. "Better Off Alone" (Jimmy Barnes) – 2:59
9. "Water Wash All Over Me" (Jimmy Barnes, Glenn Cunningham, Paul Graham) – 4:22
10. "I'm Surprised" (Tex Perkins, Jimmy Barnes, Jackie Barnes) – 2:54
11. "Losing You" (Jimmy Barnes) – 3:35
12. "Forgiveness" (Jimmy Barnes) – 4:47

=== Live at the Sydney Opera House: The Max Session ===
(Limited edition bonus CD)

1. "Flame Trees" (Steve Prestwich, Don Walker) – 5:50
2. "Out in The Blue" (Jimmy Barnes) – 4:58
3. "Without Your Love" (Jimmy Barnes, Anthony Carey) – 5:09
4. "Never Give Up" (Jimmy Barnes, Jane Barnes, Guy Davies) – 5:12
5. "Blue Hotel" (Neil Finn) – 4:49
6. "Come Undone" (Jimmy Barnes, Mark Lizotte) – 5:08
7. "Four Walls" (Don Walker) – 2:33
8. "When Your Love Is Gone" (Jimmy Barnes, Tony Brock, Kevin Savigar) – 5:36

== Personnel ==
=== Out in the Blue ===
- Jimmy Barnes – lead vocals, harmony vocals, acoustic guitar
- Jackie Barnes – drums, percussion, piano, Wurlitzer, backing vocals
- Chris Haigh – bass
- Jim Moginie – electric, acoustic, nylon and resonator guitars, keyboards, piano, rhodes, omnichord
- Mark Punch – electric, slide and baritone guitars
- Kasey Chambers – vocals on When Two Hearts Collide

=== Live at the Sydney Opera House: The Max Session ===
- Jimmy Barnes – vocals
- Ben Rodgers – acoustic guitar
- Jak Housden – electric guitar
- Lawrie Minson – pedal steel and acoustic guitar
- Dario Bortolin – bass
- Jackie Barnes – drums
- Dave Pritchard – piano
- Mark Lizotte (Diesel) – vocals and guitar on Come Undone
- Mahalia Barnes – backing vocals
- EJ Barnes – backing vocals
- Elly-May Barnes – backing vocals
- Juanita Tippins – backing vocals
- Gary Pinto – backing vocals
- Darren Percival – backing vocals

== Charts ==
Chart (2007)	Peak position
Australian ARIA Albums Chart	3

=== Year-end charts ===
Chart (2007)	Position
ARIA Albums Chart	52

== Certifications ==
Region	Certification	Certified units/sales
Australia (ARIA)	Platinum	70,000^{^}
^{^} Shipments figures based on certification alone.
