= Working Class Boy (soundtrack) =

Soundtrack album by Jimmy Barnes
- Released: 17 August 2018
- Recorded: State Theatre (Sydney), 12 April 2017
- Label: Bloodlines

Jimmy Barnes chronology
Och Aye the G'nu (2017)	Working Class Boy (2018)	My Criminal Record (2019)

Working Class Boy (subtitled The Soundtracks) is a 2018 soundtrack album by Australian singer-songwriter, Jimmy Barnes. It is the soundtrack album for the 2018 film of the same name, based on the 2016 memoir of the same name, which became a tour in 2016 and 2017 in which Barnes sang songs and told stories from the memoir. The album was released on 17 August 2018.

Disc 1 contains 12 songs, 2 instrumentals and 13 spoken word pieces captured live at the State Theatre (Sydney) on 12 April 2017. Disc 2 is an 8 song recording with a full band on a Soundstage for the movie version of Working Class Boy.

On 10 August 2018, Barnes announced royalties from the soundtrack would be donated to drought relief charities to assist Australian farmers.

At the ARIA Music Awards of 2018, the album won the ARIA Award for Best Original Soundtrack, Cast or Show Album.

== Track listing ==
Disc 1: "Stories & Songs" Live from The State Theatre

1. "Glasgow/The Dark Isle/Scotland the Brave" (spoken) – 1:30
2. "Granny's Party Song" (spoken) – 0:21
3. "Heartaches By the Number" (spoken) – 2:47
4. "My Dad" (spoken) – 0:16
5. "Around the World" – 3:09
6. "Circus Animals" (spoken) – 1:29
7. "The Lion Sleeps Tonight" (featuring Mahalia Barnes) – 2:13
8. "City of Tomorrow" (spoken) – 1:21
9. "Mahalia and the Imitation of Life" (spoken) – 2:14
10. "The Upper Room" – 6:09
11. "Runaway" (spoken) – 0:17
12. "Texas Girl at the Funeral of Her Father" – 2:41
13. "Reg Barnes" (spoken) – 1:55
14. "Reg's Piano" (spoken) – 1:15
15. "Elizabeth" (spoken) – 0:41
16. "Dark End of the Street" – 3:48
17. "David" (spoken) – 0:07
18. "Reflections of My Life" (featuring David Campbell) – 5:04
19. "Ike and Tina" (spoken) – 0:28
20. "A Fool in Love" (featuring Mahalia Barnes) – 2:58
21. "Steve and Don" (spoken) – 0:53
22. "Flame Trees" – 5:04
23. "I Could've Been Dead as Well" (spoken) – 0:13
24. "Four Walls" – 2:53
25. "Safe with Mum" (spoken) – 0:06
26. "When the War Is Over" – 5:41
27. "Still Got a Long Way to Go" (featuring Diesel) – 4:36
28. "Duke's Waltz" (Ambient Soundscape) – 2:56

Disc 2: The Movie Soundtrack

1. "Around the World" – 3:19
2. "The Lion Sleeps Tonight" (featuring Mahalia Barnes) – 2:53
3. "Texas Girl at the Funeral of Her Father" (featuring Australian Chamber Orchestra) – 3:41
4. "Dark End of the Street" – 3:37
5. "A Fool in Love" (featuring Mahalia Barnes) – 3:09
6. "The Upper Room" – 6:22
7. "When the War Is Over" – 5:34
8. "Still Got a Long Way to Go" (featuring Diesel) – 4:14

== Charts ==
Chart (2018)	Peak position
Australian Albums (ARIA)	3

== Release history ==
Region	Date	Edition	Format	Label	Catalogue
Australia	17 August 2018	Limited deluxe edition	2×CD	Bloodlines	BLOOD30X
Australia	17 August 2018	The Movie Soundtrack	Vinyl	Bloodlines	BLOODLP34
Australia	24 August 2018	Digital edition	Digital download	Bloodlines	
