= Modus =

Modus may refer to:

- Modus, the Latin name for grammatical mood, in linguistics
- Modus, the Latin name for mode (statistics)
- Modus (company), an Alberta-based company
- Modus (medieval music), a term used in several different technical meanings in medieval music theory
- The Renault Modus, a small car
- Modus (band), a pop music band in former Czechoslovakia
  - Modus (album), 1979, or the title track
- Short for modus decimandi, a type of payment made in lieu of a tithe
- Modus FX, a visual effects company based in Sainte-Thérèse, Quebec, Canada
- Modus (TV series), a Swedish television series, 2015
- "Modus", a song by Joji from his 2020 album Nectar

== See also ==
- Modus operandi
- Modus operandi (disambiguation)
- Modus vivendi
