= Och Aye the G'nu =

2017 studio album by Jimmy Barnes and The Wiggles

Studio album by Jimmy Barnes and the Wiggles
- Released: 31 March 2017
- Recorded: 2016
- Studio: Hot Potato Studios
- Genre: Children's music
- Label: ABC Music
- Producer: Anthony Field

Jimmy Barnes albums chronology
| Soul Searchin' (2016) | Och Aye the G'nu (2017) | Working Class Boy (2018) |

Och Aye the G'nu is a 2017 children's album credited to Scottish-born Australian rock singer-songwriter Jimmy Barnes, and Australian children's music group the Wiggles.

== Background ==
Och Aye the G'nu was first mentioned by producer Anthony Field in the Wiggles' 25th anniversary feature interview in May 2016. The album was recorded in 2016. After working on the project, Field said; "The songs on Och Aye the G'nu are absolutely beautiful, they come from Jimmy's heart. There's also a great sense of fun, perfect for the young listener. Every morning we'd come into the studio and be so excited, we knew we were working on a very special project for children. It was one of the greatest experiences working with Jimmy."

Several other musicians worked on the album, including Jimmy Barnes' wife Jane Barnes, their son Jackie Barnes and daughters Elly-May and Mahalia Barnes.

== Release and reception ==
The album was released on 31 March 2017 and peaked at number 34 on the ARIA Charts. Upon release, Barnes said "It has been such an honour and a pleasure to work with my old friends... 'Och Aye the G'nu' was written for my grandchildren, especially my cheeky little red headed Scot. Glasgow holds a special place in my heart and it was also inspired by my love of Scotland."

A music video of the lead track I'm a G'Nu, which is not to be confused with the Flanders and Swan song "The Gnu", was created by ABC for Kids and uploaded on their YouTube channel.

== Accolades ==
At the ARIA Music Awards of 2017, Och Aye the G'nu won the ARIA Award for Best Children's Album.

== Track listing ==
1. "I'm a G'Nu" (Introduction) – 0:13
2. "I'm a G'Nu" (Jackie Barnes, Jimmy Barnes, Anthony Field, Lachlan Gillespie) – 1:49
3. "Och Aye G'Nu and Kangaroo" (Introduction) – 0:09
4. "Och Aye G'Nu and Kangaroo" (Jackie Barnes, Jimmy Barnes, Anthony Field, Lachlan Gillespie) – 1:46
5. "When You're Living in the Zoo" (Introduction) – 0:25
6. "When You're Living in the Zoo" (Jackie Barnes, Jimmy Barnes, Anthony Field, Lachlan Gillespie) – 1:46
7. "Winter is Coming Here Soon" (Introduction) – 0:15
8. "Winter is Coming Here Soon" (Jimmy Barnes, Anthony Field, Lachlan Gillespie) – 2:40
9. "I Got New Shoes" (Introduction) – 0:12
10. "I Got New Shoes" (Jackie Barnes, Jimmy Barnes, Anthony Field) – 1:47
11. "Shake Your Shaggy, Shaggy Mane" (Introduction) – 0:10
12. "Shake Your Shaggy, Shaggy Mane" (John Field) – 1:58
13. "Two Pairs of Shoes" (Introduction) – 0:12
14. "Two Pairs of Shoes" (Jackie Barnes, Jimmy Barnes, Anthony Field, John Field) – 1:31
15. "The Haggis is Coming" (Introduction to We Love Haggis) (Jimmy Barnes, Anthony Field) – 0:16
16. "We Love Haggis, Stew and Shortbread Too!" (Jackie Barnes, Jimmy Barnes, Anthony Field, Paul Field) – 1:34
17. "The Blackbird Ballet" (Introduction) – 0:09
18. "The Blackbird Ballet" (Jimmy Barnes, Anthony Field, John Field) – 1:18
19. "I'll Be With You Forever" (Introduction) – 0:08
20. "I'll Be With You Forever" (Jackie Barnes, Jimmy Barnes, Anthony Field) – 4:06
21. "My G'Nu Kazoo" (Introduction) – 0:09
22. "My G'Nu Kazoo" (Jackie Barnes, Jimmy Barnes, Anthony Field, John Field, Lachlan Gillespie) – 0:43
23. "It's a Parrot Party" (Introduction) – 0:10
24. "It's a Parrot Party" (Jimmy Barnes, Murray Cook, Jeff Fatt, Anthony Field, Greg Page) – 2:09
25. "The Fairy Dance" (Introduction) – 0:16
26. "The Fairy Dance" (Instrumental) (Jackie Barnes, Jimmy Barnes, Oliver Brian, Anthony Field, Alex Keller) – 1:25
27. "Tip Toe in the Snow" (Introduction) – 0:13
28. "Tip Toe in the Snow" (Jackie Barnes, Emma Watkins) – 0:46
29. "Outro" – 0:14

== Personnel ==
=== Musicians ===
- Vocals: Elly-May Barnes, Jane Barnes, Jimmy Barnes, Mahalia Barnes, Maria Field, Lachlan Gillespie, Emma Watkins
- Backing Vocals: Elly-May Barnes, Jackie Barnes, Jane Barnes, Jimmy Barnes, Mahalia Barnes, John Field, Paul Field, Lachlan Gillespie, Emma Watkins
- Acoustic Guitar: Oliver Brian, Anthony Field, John Field
- Bass Guitar: Jeff McCormack
- Piano: Jackie Barnes, Jeff Fatt, Lachlan Gillespie
- Jaw Harp: Jackie Barnes
- Glockenspiel: Jackie Barnes
- Drums: Jackie Barnes, Ian Bentley, Anthony Field, Kenny Holmes
- Percussion: Jackie Barnes, Oliver Brian, Anthony Field
- Bagpipes: Anthony Field, Michael McDaniel, Robert Pearce
- Organ: Jackie Barnes, Jeff Fatt, Lachlan Gillespie
- Six-String Banjo: Oliver Brian, Anthony Field
- Tambourine: Jackie Barnes
- Electric Guitar: Oliver Brian, Anthony Field
- Elephant: Simon Pryce
- Didgeridoo: Anthony Field
- Marching Drums: Ian Bentley, Kenny Holmes
- Electric Bagpipes: Anthony Field
- Ukulele: John Field
- Nylon Guitar: Oliver Brian
- Tin Whistle: Anthony Field
- Bells: Jackie Barnes
- Kazoo: Jackie Barnes, Lachlan Gillespie

=== Staff ===
- Created and Performed by: Jimmy Barnes
- Music Produced by: Anthony Field
- Music Recorded at: Hot Potato Studios, Sydney
- Music Recorded by: Alex Keller and Jeff McCormack
- Music Mixed by: Alex Keller
- Executive Producer: Paul Field
- Production Managers: Kate Chiodo and Ivy Gaymer
- Graphic Design: Daniel Attard
- Stills Photographers: Daniel Attard and Paul Field

== Charts ==
| Chart (2017) | Peak position |
|---|---|
| Australian Albums (ARIA) | 34 |

== Release history ==
| Region | Date | Format | Label | Catalogue/ISBN |
|---|---|---|---|---|
| Australia | 31 March 2017 | CD; digital download | ABC Music | 374198 |
| Australia | 1 April 2017 | Book | Bonnier Publishing Australia | 9781760407063 |
