= Raw (Jimmy Barnes album) =

Live album by Jimmy Barnes
- Released: November 2001
- Recorded: 2001
- Genre: Rock
- Length: 61:47

Jimmy Barnes chronology
Soul Deeper... Songs from the Deep South (2000)	Raw (2001)	Double Happiness (2005)

Raw is a live album by Australian singer Jimmy Barnes. The album was recorded live at Colonial Stadium in Melbourne, Australia on 24 March 2001 and released in November 2001. The album peaked a number 57 on the ARIA charts.

== Track listing ==
Standard edition

1. "Love & Hate"
2. "Seven Days"
3. "Land of a Thousand Dances"
4. "All the Young Dudes"
5. "Lay Down Your Guns"
6. "Khe Sanh"
7. "Cheap Wine"
8. "I Put a Spell on You"
9. "Bow River"
10. "Working Class Man"

== Bonus tracks ==
There are also four bonus tracks included on the album, which were recorded live at Shepherd's Bush Empire on 1 August 2001:

1. "Stone Cold"
2. "Goin' Down Alone"
3. "I'd Die to Be with You Tonight"
4. "Do or Die"

== Charts ==
Chart (2001)	Peak position
ARIA Albums Chart	57
ARIA DVD Chart	5
