= Hey Rudolph! =

Studio album by The Tin Lids
- Released: November 1991
- Studio: Freight Train (Sydney)
- Genre: Christmas
- Length: 60:59
- Label: Little Rock
- Producer: David Frogatt

The Tin Lids chronology
Hey Rudolph! (1991)	Snakes & Ladders (1992)

Singles from Hey Rudolph!
- 1. "Christmas Day" Released: November 1991

Hey Rudolph! is the first studio album from the Australian children's pop group the Tin Lids. It was released in November 1991 and peaked at number 6 on the ARIA albums chart. The album has sold over 100,000 copies in Australia.

== Background ==
Australian children's pop group The Tin Lids released their debut album in November 1991 via Mushroom Records. They had formed a year earlier with the line-up of Mahalia Barnes and her three younger siblings Eliza-Jane "E J", Jackie and Elly-May, all on vocals. They are the four children of Jane Mahoney and Jimmy Barnes. Hey Rudolph! was arranged, recorded and produced by David Frogatt, who also provided most of its instrumentation, at Jimmy's Freight Train Studios. "Christmas Day" was released as the album's lead and only single in November 1991. The song peaked at number 40 on the ARIA singles chart.

== Track listing ==
1. "Little Drummer Boy" - 4:48
2. "The First Noel" - 4:12
3. "Christmas Day" - 6:06
4. "Little Donkey" - 3:43
5. "If Santa Forgets" (duet with Jimmy Barnes) - 3:49
6. "O Come All Ye Faithful" - 3:44
7. "Jingle Bells/Rudolph the Red-Nosed Reindeer" - 6:08
8. "We Three Kings" - 3:45
9. "Away in a Manger" - 3:14
10. "Do I Hear Laughing?" - 4:19
11. "Twelve Days of Christmas" - 3:53
12. "Hark the Herald Angels Sing" - 3:45
13. "Silent Night" - 4:47
14. "Mary's Boy Child" - 4:12
15. "We Wish You a Merry Christmas" - 0:34

== Charts ==
Chart (1991/92)	Peak position
Australian Albums (ARIA)	6

== Certifications ==
Region	Certification	Certified units/sales
Australia (ARIA)	Platinum	70,000^{^}
^{^} Shipments figures based on certification alone.

== Release history ==
Country	Date	Format	Label	Catalogue
Australia	November 1991	CD, Cassette	Little Rock	D26071
