= 30:30 Hindsight =

Greatest hits album by Jimmy Barnes
- Released: 29 August 2014
- Recorded: 1984–2014
- Genre: Rock
- Label: Liberation Music

Jimmy Barnes chronology
Rage and Ruin (2010)	30:30 Hindsight (2014)	Best of the Soul Years (2015)

30:30 Hindsight is the fifteenth studio album by Jimmy Barnes. The album celebrates 30 years since his chart-topping debut solo album, Bodyswerve in September 1984. It was released in August 2014 and debuted at number 1 in Australia, giving Barnes his tenth solo number 1 album.

30:30 Hindsight was nominated for Best Rock Album at the 2014 ARIA Music Awards; however, it lost to Blackbird by Dan Sultan.

== Promotion ==
Barnes performed "I'd Die to Be with You Tonight" live with Diesel on The X Factor on 25 August 2014.

Barnes said of the album: "We've actually kicked some new life into the songs, I think when people hear this new record, they will get a sense that these are very modern takes on these songs. They sound fresh and they sound new and they sound alive."

== Reception ==
Paul Stewart of the Daily Express wrote, "This is definitely a toe-tapping modern rock album with great ebb and flow and is certainly well worth a listen." Dan Lander of Rolling Stone wrote, "Barnes' voice has lost none of its bite, and he genuinely sounds like he’s ecstatic to be putting fresh life into this collection of old favorites."

== Track listing ==
=== Standard version ===
The two-disc, 30 track release contains 17 new recordings and 13 classic Jimmy Barnes hits spanning his solo career.

Disc one (2014)

1. "Lay Down Your Guns" (featuring The Living End) - 3:33
2. "Time Will Tell" (featuring Baby Animals) - 3:19
3. "Good Times" (featuring Keith Urban) - 4:06
4. "Ride the Night Away" (featuring Steven Van Zandt) - 5:21
5. "Stand Up" (featuring Mahalia Barnes and The Soul Mates) - 3:55
6. "I'd Die to Be with You Tonight" (featuring Diesel) - 4:10
7. "Stone Cold" (featuring Tina Arena & Joe Bonamassa) - 6:52
8. "Working Class Man" (featuring Jonathan Cain And Ian Moss) - 4:02
9. "Going Down Alone" (featuring Jonathan Cain, Neal Schon & Joe Bonamassa) - 5:09
10. "Love and Hate" (featuring Shihad) - 2:55
11. "No Second Prize" (featuring The Family Choir) - 4:03
12. "I'd Rather Be Blind" (featuring Jon Stevens) - 4:25
13. "When Your Love is Gone" (featuring Ruby Rodgers and The Tin Lids) - 5:10
14. "Too Much Ain't Enough Love" (featuring Joe Bonamassa) - 5:35
15. "Still On Your Side (featuring Bernard Fanning) - 4:39
16. "Walk On" (featuring David Campbell) - 4:22
17. "The Other Kind" (featuring Troy Cassar-Daley) - 5:31

Disc two (1984–2010)

1. "No Second Prize"
2. "Daylight"
3. "Working Class Man"
4. "Driving Wheels"
5. "Let's Make It Last All Night"
6. "Love Is Enough"
7. "When Something Is Wrong with My Baby" (featuring John Farnham)
8. "The Weight" (featuring The Badloves)
9. "Change of Heart"
10. "Lover Lover"
11. "Out in the Blue"
12. "Red Hot"
13. "Largs Pier Hotel"

=== Deluxe version ===
The three-disc, 40 track edition contained the same 17 new recordings on disc one 17, and 23 classic Jimmy Barnes hits spanning his solo career.

Disc two (1984–1992)

1. "No Second Prize" - 4:07
2. "Promise Me You'll Call" - 3:31
3. "Daylight" - 3:19
4. "Working Class Man" - 4:11
5. "Driving Wheels" - 5:17
6. "Waiting for the Heartache" - 4:35
7. "Let's Make It Last All Night" - 4:06
8. "Little Darling" - 4:17
9. "Love Is Enough" - 3:49
10. "When Something Is Wrong With My Baby" (featuring John Farnham) - 4:57
11. "(Simply) The Best" (featuring Tina Turner) - 4:12

Disc two (1993-2010)

1. "The Weight" (featuring The Badloves) - 4:26
2. "It Will Be Alright" - 3:26
3. "Wheels in Motion" - 3:22
4. "Change of Heart" - 4:01
5. "Lover Lover" - 3:29
6. "Thankful for the Rain" - 3:57
7. "All the Young Dudes" - 3:25
8. "Out in the Blue" - 4:48
9. "When Two Hearts Collide" (featuring Kasey Chambers) - 3:49
10. "Red Hot" - 2:34
11. "Before the Devil Knows You're Dead" - 4:12
12. "Largs Pier Hotel" - 4:49

== Charts ==
=== Weekly charts ===
Chart (2014)	Peak position
Australian Albums (ARIA)	1
New Zealand Albums (RMNZ)	20

=== Year-end charts ===
Chart (2014)	Position
Australian Albums Chart	19
Chart (2015)	Position
Australian Albums Chart	90

== Certifications ==
Region	Certification	Certified units/sales
Australia (ARIA)	Platinum	70,000^{^}
New Zealand (RMNZ)	Platinum	15,000^{‡}
^{^} Shipments figures based on certification alone.^{‡} Sales+streaming figures based on certification alone.

== See also ==
- List of number-one albums of 2014 (Australia)
