= Rage and Ruin =

Studio album by Jimmy Barnes
- Released: 27 August 2010
- Recorded: 2009−10
- Genre: Rock
- Length: 50:12
- Label: Liberation Music

Jimmy Barnes chronology
The Rhythm and the Blues (2009)	Rage and Ruin (2010)	30:30 Hindsight (2014)

Rage and Ruin is the fourteenth solo studio album by Jimmy Barnes, released through Liberation Music on 27 August 2010. It would be his last album of original material until 2019's My Criminal Record.

== Review ==
Jon O'Brien from AllMusic said: "After tackling old-school R&B, country-roots, and Memphis soul on his previous three releases, Australian rock veteran Jimmy Barnes returns to more familiar territory on his 14th studio release, Rage and Ruin. Produced by longtime collaborator Don Gehman, the back-to-basics affair sees the gravelly-voiced rocker battle his demons on 12 tracks inspired by a book of notes he wrote while struggling with drug and alcohol addiction. It isn't exactly pretty, but for fans of vintage Australian pub rock, Rage and Ruin ticks all the boxes."

== Track listing ==
CD/Digital download

1. "God or Money" (Jimmy Barnes and Mike Daly) – 3:52
2. "Before the Devil Knows You're Dead" (Barnes/Daly) – 4:11
3. "Letter from a Dead Heart" (Barnes/Daly) – 4:25
4. "Stupid Heart" (Barnes/Daly) – 3:54
5. "Adam Was Just a Man" (Barnes/Mark Simos) – 4:18
6. "I've Seen It All (Rage and Ruin)" (Barnes/Simos) – 5:25
7. "Can't Do It Again" (Barnes/Simos) – 4:28
8. "Time Can Change" (Barnes/Daly) – 3:58
9. "This Ain't the Day That I Die" (Barnes/Daly) – 3:22
10. "Love Can Break the Hardest Heart" (Barnes/Simos) – 4:12
11. "Turn It Around" (Barnes/Daly) – 3:19
12. "Largs Pier Hotel" (Barnes/Simos) – 4:48

Deluxe edition bonus tracks

13. "Navigator"
14. "Taking Time"
15. "One More Night"
16. "Let It Go"

== Charts ==
=== Weekly charts ===
Chart (2013)	Peak position
Australian Albums (ARIA)	3

=== Year-end charts ===
Chart (2013)	Position
Australian Albums Chart	79
Australian Artists Albums Chart	21

== Certifications ==
Region	Certification	Certified units/sales
Australia (ARIA)	Gold	35,000^{^}
^{^} Shipments figures based on certification alone.

== Singles ==
1. "Before the Devil Knows You're Dead"
2. "God or Money"
