= Shutting Down Our Town =

Single by Jimmy Barnes

from the album My Criminal Record
- Released: 26 April 2019
- Length: 4:44
- Label: BloodLines
- Songwriter(s): Troy Cassar-Daley

Jimmy Barnes singles chronology
"My Criminal Record" (2019)	"Shutting Down Our Town" (2019)	"I Won't Let You Down" (2019)

"Shutting Down Our Town" is a song by Australian rock musician, Jimmy Barnes. It was released on 26 April 2019 as the second single from Barnes' studio album My Criminal Record.

In the week after its release, the song was the second most added song on radio, behind "Me!" by Taylor Swift.

At the APRA Music Awards of 2020, "Shutting Down Our Town" won the Most Performed Rock Work of the Year.

== Background and release ==
Troy Cassar-Daley wrote "Shutting Down Our Town" for Barnes after finding inspiration from the Barnes' 2016 memoir Working Class Boy. Barnes said "I changed a couple of words just because of local knowledge, but it was 99.999% Troy's song” adding "...he played it to me and I immediately felt the connection." Barnes said "This song has a lot of personal meaning. It's about growing up in Elizabeth and the closing down of the Holden factory where I once worked as a young working class boy in North Adelaide" adding "I drove through there not long after I heard the song for the first time, and I felt a pain in my heart for the people there who are battling, trying to make a living when everything is stacked up against them." Barnes admits the song moved him to tears.

"It's sort of a heartland "Working Class Man" anthem... This was written by somebody who feels the pain, and who's writing about the darker side of Australia which I never wanted to face before."

Barnes premiered the song in November 2018 during his One Electric Day concert and was officially released on 26 April 2019.

== Music video ==
The music video for "Shutting Down Our Town" was released on 6 May 2019.

== Charts ==
Chart (2019)	Peak position
Australia Digital Tracks (ARIA)	35

== Certifications ==
Region	Certification	Certified units/sales
Australia (ARIA)	Gold	35,000^{‡}
^{‡} Sales+streaming figures based on certification alone.
