= Love and Fear (album) =

Studio album by Jimmy Barnes
- Released: 5 November 1999
- Recorded: 1998–99
- Genre: Rock
- Length: 42:30
- Label: Mushroom Records
- Producer: Jon Farriss and Mark Opitz

Jimmy Barnes chronology
Barnes Hits Anthology (1996)	Love and Fear (1999)	Soul Deeper... Songs from the Deep South (2000)

Love and Fear is the ninth studio album by Australian rock musician, Jimmy Barnes. It peaked at #22, Barnes' lowest charting album, and his only album not to peak in the top 5. It was certified Gold by ARIA for sales of 35,000 in Australia.

Love and Fear purged a lot of demons that had been plaguing Barnes for many years. He confronted issues that he had avoided by being on tour and by drinking and taking drugs. Although receiving lukewarm commercial and critical reception at the time of its release, Love and Fear has grown in stature over the ensuing decade and is now one of Barnes' most highly regarded albums.

"Love and Hate" and "Thankful for the Rain" were released as singles, but both charted outside the top 50.

== Track listing ==
All songs written by Jimmy Barnes.

CD

1. "Love and Hate" – 2:46
2. "Time Will Tell" – 3:42
3. "By the Grace of God" – 4:00
4. "Thankful for the Rain" – 3:55
5. "Temptation" – 3:13
6. "Love Song" – 3:22
7. "Do It to Me" – 4:20
8. "Love Gone Cold" – 4:17
9. "Heart Cries Alone" – 4:18
10. "Radio Song" – 3:12
11. "Blind Can't Lead the Blind" – 3:05
12. "Sorry" – 2:22
13. "Hear and Now" – 3:44 (iTunes bonus track)
14. "Don't Cry" – 3:12 (iTunes bonus track)

== Weekly charts ==
Chart (1999)	Peak position
Australian Albums (ARIA)	22

== Certifications ==
Region	Certification	Certified units/sales
Australia (ARIA)	Gold	35,000^{^}
^{^} Shipments figures based on certification alone.

== Credits ==
Credits adapted from AllMusic.

- Vocals, guitar, producer: Jimmy Barnes
- Bass: Michael Hegerty
- Drums, bass, keyboards, backing vocals, producer: Jon Farriss
- Producer, engineer: Mark Opitz
- Engineer: Mick Seage
- Mixer: Mike Shipley
- Guitar: Mark McEntee
- Guitar, backing vocals: Dave Leslie
