= Blue Christmas (Jimmy Barnes album) =

Studio album by Jimmy Barnes
- Released: 25 November 2022
- Length: 40:52
- Label: Bloodlines

Jimmy Barnes chronology
Soul Deep 30 (2022)	Blue Christmas (2022)	Defiant (2025)

Singles from Blue Christmas
- 1. "Blue Christmas" Released: 21 October 2022

Singles from Blue Christmas (Expanded edition)
- 1. "If Santa Forgets" Released: 1 November 2023

Blue Christmas is the twentieth studio and first Christmas album by Scottish-born, Australian musician Jimmy Barnes, released on 25 November 2022 through Bloodlines. Speaking on his motivations to release a Christmas album, in a press statement, Barnes said, "One of the greatest surprises I ever got from our children was when they all snuck away into the garage and secretly recorded themselves singing carols for me. On Christmas morning, when I awoke, they proudly gave me the recording and sat eagerly waiting for me to listen to it. That year I received lots of great gifts from various family members, but that recording had me weeping like a baby. It was the most beautiful gift I ever got. This album is my gift back to the kids, the grandkids and everyone out there who just wants to sit and sing with their family on Christmas. These songs take me back and they remind me why I'm here right now. I hope they do the same for you."

The album was preceded by the title track, released on 21 October 2022.

The album debuted at number one on the ARIA Charts, becoming Barnes' 15th solo chart topper, extending the record for most Australian number one albums.

The album is scheduled for an expanded edition re-release on 24 November 2023.

== Track listing ==
standard edition

1. "Jingle Bell Rock" – 3:03
2. "Have Yourself A Merry Little Christmas" – 4:44
3. "Santa Claus Is Coming To Town" – 3:17
4. "Let It Snow!" – 2:07
5. "White Christmas" – 4:46
6. "The Christmas Song (Chestnuts Roasting On An Open Fire)" – 3:19
7. "Blue Christmas" – 2:10
8. "Run Rudolph Run" – 3:21
9. "Little Drummer Boy" – 3:59
10. "Silent Night" – 4:14
11. "Rockin' Around The Christmas Tree" – 2:17
12. "Auld Lang Syne" – 4:35

2023 expanded edition

1. "O Holy Night" -
2. "If Santa Forgets" (with The Tin Lids) - 4:13
3. "Jingle Bell Rock" – 3:03
4. "Have Yourself A Merry Little Christmas" – 4:44
5. "Santa Claus Is Coming To Town" – 3:17
6. "Let It Snow!" – 2:07
7. "White Christmas" – 4:46
8. "The Christmas Song (Chestnuts Roasting On An Open Fire)" – 3:19
9. "Blue Christmas" – 2:10
10. "Run Rudolph Run" – 3:21
11. "Little Drummer Boy" – 3:59
12. "Silent Night" – 4:14
13. "Rockin' Around The Christmas Tree" – 2:17
14. "Auld Lang Syne" – 4:35

== Charts ==
=== Weekly charts ===
Weekly chart performance for Blue Christmas
Chart (2022)	Peak position
Australian Albums (ARIA)	1

=== Year-end charts ===
Year-end chart performance for Blue Christmas
Chart (2022)	Position
Australian Artist (ARIA)	13

== Release history ==
Release history and formats for Blue Christmas
Region	Date	Format	Label	Version	Catalogue
Australia	25 November 2022	CD	Bloodlines	standard	BLOOD111
Australia	25 November 2022	Blue vinyl	Bloodlines	standard	BLOOD111LP
Australia	24 November 2023	CD, digital	Bloodlines	Expanded edition	BLOOD113
