= Working Class Man (memoir) =

2017 memoir by Jimmy Barnes

- Author: Jimmy Barnes
- Language: English
- Genre: memoir
- Published: 2017 (HarperCollins)
- Publication place: Australia
- Media type: Print (hardback)
- Pages: 512
- ISBN: 9781460753422

Working Class Man is the 2017 memoir by Jimmy Barnes, and sequel to his 2016 Working Class Boy.

On 3 May 2018, Barnes won the biography of the year at the Australian Book Industry Awards for the second year in a row.

== Reception ==
Michael Dwyer from The Sydney Morning Herald called the memoir "honest" and said "It begins exactly where last year's Working Class Boy ended: on a tenuous high note, with our hero escaping an Adelaide childhood of grim poverty and violent abuse in the back of Cold Chisel's truck." adding "For vintage Chisel fans, frank and ample disclosures about band dynamics and company business are in keeping with Barnes' hugely readable, no-bullshit style. The isolation and self-doubt of his solo years are laid bare too, as he reels from one arranged American songwriting marriage to another in a chemical-hoovering fury."

David Free from The Australian said this is a sequel "in the fullest sense of the word". Free said "Read this one by itself and you will find yourself looking at a cliche: the self-destructive rock star. But the first book lets you know, in pitiless detail, exactly what the self-destroyer was out to destroy. In this respect and others, the first book shines a light into the second. The adult who behaved like a child is explained, in large part, by the child who had to behave like an adult.".

John Purcell said "In Working Class Man Jimmy tells us in his famously direct and raw style, what it was really like to be in Cold Chisel, one of Australia's most iconic bands, as well as what life was like as a record breaking solo artist. Jimmy does not flinch, he tells it as it is: the drugs, the sex, the money, the highs and the even higher highs and those heartbreaking lows. This book has already shocked early readers with its honesty. This is the real deal."
