= The Tin Lids =

Australian children's pop group

- Origin: Sydney, New South Wales, Australia
- Genres: Children's, pop
- Years active: 1990–94
- Labels: Little Rock, Mushroom Records
- Members: Eliza-Jane "E.J." Barnes; Elly-May Barnes; Jackie Barnes; Mahalia Barnes

The Tin Lids were an Australian children's pop group formed in 1990 with Mahalia, Eliza-Jane "E.J.", Jackie and Elly-May Barnes all on vocals. They are the four children of Jane and Jimmy Barnes.

The group released three albums: Hey Rudolph! (November 1991), which peaked at No. 6 on the ARIA Albums Chart, Snakes & Ladders (July 1992), which was nominated for Best Children's Album at the 1993 ARIA Awards, and Dinosaur Dreaming (1993). The group also released four singles: "Christmas Day" (December 1991), which reached No. 40 on the ARIA Singles Chart and won Children's Composition of the Year at the 1992 APRA Awards, a cover version of Was (Not Was)'s song, "Walk the Dinosaur", "School" (August 1992) featuring The Yunupingu Kids (children of Mandawuy Yunupingu), and "Dinosaurs in Space" (1994).

== History ==
The band members are all children of Scotland-born Australian rock musician, Jimmy Barnes, and his wife Jane: Mahalia, Eliza-Jane "E.J.", Jackie, and Elly-May. "Tin lid" is rhyming slang for "kid". The group were in the children's choir as part of the back-up singers on their father's track, "When Your Love is Gone", released as a single in March 1991. They appeared in live concerts with Jimmy and his band.

The Tin Lids released their first album in November 1991 as a collection of Christmas carols, Hey Rudolph!, which peaked at No. 6 on the ARIA Albums Chart and was a platinum-selling album. Most of the instrumentation was supplied by David Froggatt, the album's producer and arranger, and it was recorded at Barnes' Freight Train Studios in Sydney. The album provided the first single, "Christmas Day" (December 1991), which reached No. 40 on the ARIA Singles Chart and won Children's Composition of the Year at the 1992 APRA Awards.

Their next single was a cover version of Was (Not Was)'s song, "Walk the Dinosaur", which was released in May 1992. A Canberra Times journalist described it as "a joint venture with Hanna-Barbera and The Flintstones" [sic]. The video featured guest appearances by Fred and Dino. (Note: "Walk the Dinosaur" also appeared on the "Dinosaurs in Space" single.)

Their second album was Snakes & Ladders (July 1992), which was nominated for the ARIA Award for Best Children's Album in 1993.

Another single from that album, "School" (August 1992), was written by Mandawuy Yunupingu (lead singer of Yothu Yindi). That track was recorded by The Tin Lids and The Yunupingu Kids. The latter group were the Indigenous leader's daughters. Barnes and Yunupingu were highlighting the Sister Schools project, which hopes that "schools with few or no Aboriginal children will forge educational and social links with schools with large numbers of Aboriginal children, in an attempt to foster tolerance and understanding". One of the singers, Dhapanbal Yunupingu, later recalled, "They took us all into Jimmy's studio, Jimmy's kids and us, and we did this recording. It took about a week, but we had a lot of fun".

The Tin Lids' third and final album, Dinosaur Dreaming (1993), provided the single, "Dinosaurs in Space" (1994). (Note: "Walk the Dinosaur" and "Swamp Stomp" (from the Snakes & Ladders album) also appeared on the album.) The group disbanded in that year.

== Members ==
- Mahalia Barnes (aged 9–12)
- Eliza-Jane "E.J." Barnes (aged 7–10)
- Jackie Barnes (aged 5-8)
- Elly-May Barnes (aged 2–5)

== Discography ==
=== Studio albums ===
List of studio albums, with selected chart positions and certifications
Title	Album details	Peak chart positions	Certification
Title	Album details	AUS	Certification
Hey Rudolph!	Released: November 1991; Label: Little Rock (D26071); Format: CD, Cassette	6	ARIA: Platinum
Snakes & Ladders	Released: July 1992; Label: Little Rock (D26076); Format: CD, cassette	54	
Dinosaur Dreaming	Released: 1993; Label: Little Rock; Format: CD, cassette	128	

=== Singles ===
List of singles, with selected chart positions
Title	Year	Peak chart positions	Album
Title	Year	AUS	Album
"Christmas Day"	1991	40	Hey Rudolph!
"Walk the Dinosaur"	1992	64	Snakes & Ladders
"School" (with The Yunupingu Kids)	1992	131	Snakes & Ladders
"Dinosaurs in Space"	1994	—	Dinosaur Dreaming
"If Santa Forgets" (with Jimmy Barnes)	2023	—	Blue Christmas
"—" denotes releases that did not chart or were not released in that country.

== Awards and nominations ==
=== APRA Music Awards ===
Year	Nominated works	Award	Result
1992	"Christmas Day" (David Leslie Froggatt)	Children's Composition of the Year	Won

=== ARIA Music Awards ===
Year	Nominated works	Award	Result
1993	Snakes & Ladders	Best Children's Album	Nominated
