= Defiant (album) =

Studio album by Jimmy Barnes
- Released: 6 June 2025
- Recorded: 2023−2024
- Studio: Nashville and Sydney
- Length: 44:09
- Label: Mushroom Music
- Producer: Kevin Shirley

Jimmy Barnes chronology
Blue Christmas (2022)	Defiant (2025)

Singles from Defiant
- 1. "New Day" / "Beyond the River Bend" Released: 25 February 2025; 2. "The Long Road" Released: 4 April 2025; 3. "Defiant" Released: 9 May 2025; 4. "That's What You Do for Love" Released: 30 May 2025

Defiant is the twenty-first studio album by Scottish-born, Australian musician Jimmy Barnes, announced on 25 February 2025 and released on 6 June 2025.

About the title, Barnes said: "It's no secret that this has caused me some problems over the years, but I've finally learned how to turn my stubborn Scottish streak into something positive – something that helps me survive. I didn't set out to do it deliberately, but now that the album is finished, I can see there's a recurring theme about the satisfaction you can get from fighting back. That's why it's called Defiant."

The album will be supported with a six-date national tour, commencing in June 2025 in Adelaide. The support act will be Taylor Sheridan.

== Singles ==
Upon announcement of the album, Barnes released the two lead singles "New Day" and "Beyond the River Bend". "The Long Road", "Defiant" and "That's What You Do for Love" were released prior to the album.

== Reception ==
Professional ratings
Review scores
Source	Rating
Rolling Stone Australia	4/5 stars
The Guardian	3/5 stars
The Rock Pit	8.5/10

James Jennings from Rolling Stone Australia called it "a collection of rock 'n' roll belters that ranks up there with his best".

Bernard Zuel from The Guardian said "This makes for an album that could hardly be said to break new ground or reach stellar heights. But it's also true that it nails the essentials of Jimmy Barnes – and even more so, the Jimmy Barnes that people wanted to hear in the good and the bad times almost half a century ago."

Sean Bennett from The Rock Pit said "Throughout the album we find punchy rockers that light up your ears". Bennett named "Never Stop Loving You" as the standout track.

Darryl Sterdan from Tinnitist said "These are clearly the songs of a man who still has a point to prove: raw and inspiring. And he is in career-best voice — riding and driving an emotional rollercoaster from soothing croons to wailing abandon. They are the sounds of a singer who has finally arrived at the point of complete instrumental control."

== Track listing ==
1. "That's What You Do for Love" (Michael Paynter) – 5:24
2. "New Day" (Jimmy Barnes, Paynter) – 3:42
3. "Beyond the River Bend" (Barnes) – 4:29
4. "Never Stop Loving You" (Guy Davies) – 6:42
5. "Defiant" (Barnes, Paynter, Benjamin Rodgers) – 3:50
6. "The Long Road" (Barnes, Paynter) – 3:47
7. "Damned if I Do, Damned If I Don't" (Barnes) – 4:12
8. "Dig Deep" (Barnes, Davies) – 4:11
9. "Nothing Comes for Nothing" (Barnes, Don Walker) – 3:40
10. "Sea of Love" (Barnes) – 4:09

== Charts ==
=== Weekly charts ===
Weekly chart performance for Defiant
Chart (2025)	Peak position
Australian Albums (ARIA)	1

=== Year-end charts ===
Year-end chart performance for Defiant
Chart (2025)	Position
Australian Artist Albums (ARIA)	10

== Release history ==
Release history and formats for Defiant
Region	Date	Format	Label	Catalogue
Australia	6 June 2025	CD	Mushroom Music	MUSH011CD
Australia	6 June 2025	Vinyl	Mushroom Music	MUSH011LP2
