= The Rhythm and the Blues =

Studio album by Jimmy Barnes
- Released: 28 August 2009
- Recorded: 2008−09
- Genres: Soul, rock
- Label: Liberation
- Producer: Don Gehman

Jimmy Barnes chronology
Out in the Blue (2007)	The Rhythm and the Blues (2009)	Rage and Ruin (2010)

Professional ratings
Review scores
Source	Rating
The Border Mail	3/4 stars

The Rhythm and the Blues is the thirteenth solo studio album by Australian rock musician Jimmy Barnes, released through Liberation Music on 28 August 2009. The album was produced by Don Gehman in Los Angeles and peaked at number one on the Australian Albums Chart for two weeks. The Rhythm and the Blues was Barnes' ninth solo album (thirteenth including his Cold Chisel records) to reach number one on the ARIA Charts, an all-time record for an Australian artist.

The album was touted as a sequel to Barnes' previous works Soul Deep and Soul Deeper... Songs From the Deep South. It features cover versions of tracks from throughout the late 1940s to the 1960s, with songs by the likes of Ray Charles, Little Richard, Ike & Tina Turner, Bo Diddley, Stevie Wonder and Nina Simone.

== Track listing ==
1. "Red Hot" (Billy Lee Riley cover)
2. "That's Right"
3. "Hallelujah I Love Her So" (Ray Charles cover)
4. "That's How It Is (When You're in Love)" (Otis Clay cover)
5. "Keep a Knocking" (Little Richard cover)
6. "Reconsider Me"
7. "Shake Rattle & Roll"
8. "Rockin' Pneumonia"
9. "A Fool in Love" (Ike & Tina Turner cover)
10. "You Can't Judge a Book" (Bo Diddley cover)
11. "I Was Made to Love Her" (Stevie Wonder cover)
12. "Young Blood" (The Coasters cover)
13. "My Baby Just Cares for Me" (Nina Simone cover)

=== Bonus tracks ===
1. "Sea Cruise"

== Charts ==
=== Weekly charts ===
Chart (2009)	Peak position
Australian Albums Chart	1

=== Year-end charts ===
Chart (2009)	Position
ARIA Albums Chart	36

== Certifications ==
Region	Certification	Certified units/sales
Australia (ARIA)	Platinum	70,000^{^}
^{^} Shipments figures based on certification alone.

== Personnel ==
- Jimmy Barnes — Vocals, guitar
- Julie Delgardo — Vocals
- James Gadson — Drums
- Darrell Leonard — Trumpet
- Reggie McBride — Bass
- Tom Peterson — Saxophone
- Joe Sublett - Saxophone
- Kennard Ramsey — Vocals
- Johnny Lee Schell — Guitar
- Mike Thompson — Keyboards
- Don Gehman — Producer

== See also ==
- List of number-one albums of 2009 (Australia)
