= Modus operandi (disambiguation) =

A modus operandi is someone's habits of working, particularly in the context of business or criminal investigations.

Modus operandi may also refer to:

- Modus Operandi (Photek album), 1997
- Modus Operandi (Jimmy Barnes album), 2019
- "Modus Operandi", a song by Airbase
- "Rare Species (Modus Operandi)", a song by Mobb Deep from the Soul in the Hole soundtrack
- Modus Operandi (film), a 2009 film directed by Frankie Latina
