= Modus (company) =

Canadian manufacturing corporation

Modus Inc. is an Alberta-based Canadian company that manufactures modular buildings and associated accommodation units, for use in industries such as education, telecommunications, and oil and gas. With its construction technology based on the use of structural insulated panels, Modus modular buildings are intended for use in permanent accommodation solutions and other applications requiring high performance standards. The Modus Group of Companies includes Modus Structures, the directing body of the company operating out of Crossfield, Alberta; Modus Clear Choice Windows, producing windows and operating out of Swift Current, Saskatchewan; and Modus Steel, producing steel components and buildings and operating out of Crossfield.

== History ==
Modus Inc. was founded in 2004 by John Verhagen (CEO), Mitz Simonelli (VP Finance), Joe Dotto (VP Operations), and Mark Cole (VP Engineering). Modus Inc. first developed and executed a prototype modular building to showcase new design concepts for modular facilities. This concept incorporated many changes to traditional modular construction, and was intended to address many of the inherent problems and constraints with typical modular construction. The prototype was first launched as a modular building unit for the Alberta Government. To date, Modus has produced over 1,000 classrooms and daycare units in Alberta and Saskatchewan.

Since its beginnings, Modus now maintains 3 plants for a total manufacturing capacity of 172,000 square feet, and counts among its support contingent over 145 employees.

Modus' product also proved useful in the telecommunications industry as relocatable shelters for telecommunications equipment. Production of the units began with a major sale to Clearnet Networks (now merged into Telus) and continued to include orders to Bell Mobility, Bell West and Expertech. Other units were shipped to end-users such as the Department of National Defence, SNC Lavalin, Morrison-Herschfield, Alberta Fire-Net, Alberta Supernet (Axia) and Suncor Energy.

In 2009, Randy Ludwar was named CEO and the prior partners joined the Board of Directors.

Current Board Members: Mark Cole, Founder(Vice President), Joe Dotto, Founder(Vice President), Mitz Simonelli - Founder Vice President Sales & Marketing, John Verhagen - Founder President

Current Modus Team: James Nicholson - Director of Operations, Chris Denis - Senior Director of Projects & Business Development, Tom Payne - CFO Current CEO - Cal Harvey(Sean Harvey) former Mayor of Vernon(1999-2005)
