= Working Class Boy (film) =

- Theatrical film poster
- Directed by: Mark Joffe
- Production company: CJZ
- Distributed by: Universal Pictures
- Release date: 23 August 2018
- Running time: 104 minutes
- Country: Australia
- Language: English

Working Class Boy is a 2018 Australian documentary film about the life of Jimmy Barnes, based on the 2016 memoir of the same name. The film looks on one of Australia's most legendary and iconic artists; his traumatic childhood, fuelled with domestic violence, poverty and alcoholism and his evolution from James Dixon Swan to Jimmy Barnes.

The film also features musical performances with his children Mahalia Barnes and David Campbell, as well as his brother-in-law, Diesel.

Barnes told news.com.au, "Everyone wanted to do a TV miniseries like Molly or Olivia Newton-John and I told them it is just not happening. I wanted it to be true to the book. We’re dealing with sensitive issues, sensitive to me, my family, my siblings, my friends and I didn’t want to glamorise it or play down the gravity of the violence of abuse."

The film was released on 23 August 2018 in over 220 cinemas around Australia. The special was broadcast on free-to-air television 6 weeks later on October 1, 2018, due to an early interest in the project by the Seven Network.
