= Soul Deeper... Songs from the Deep South =

Soul Deeper... Songs From the Deep South

Studio album by Jimmy Barnes
- Released: 17 November 2000
- Recorded: 1999–2000
- Studio: Freight Train Studios Bowral, Australia
- Genre: Soul
- Length: 52:46
- Language: English
- Label: Mushroom Records

Jimmy Barnes chronology
Love and Fear (1999)	Soul Deeper... Songs From the Deep South (2000)	Raw (2001)

Singles from Soul Deep
- 1. "Chain of Fools" Released: October 2000; 2. "Land of 1000 Dances" / "To Love Somebody" Released: December 2000

Soul Deeper... Songs From the Deep South is the tenth studio album by Australian rock singer Jimmy Barnes. Following the success of his 1991 album Soul Deep, Barnes returned with another album of soul covers. A special 2CD edition was released, featuring five bonus tracks. It was certified Platinum by ARIA in Australia.

== Track listing ==
1. "Land of 1000 Dances" (Chris Kenner) – 2:35
2. "Chain of Fools" (Don Covay) – 3:21
3. "What Becomes of the Broken Hearted" (William Weatherspoon, Paul Riser, James Dean) – 3:36
4. "To Love Somebody" (Barry & Robin Gibb) – 3:51
5. "634-5789 (Soulsville, U.S.A.)" (Eddie Floyd, Steve Cropper) – 3:06
6. "Ain't Too Proud to Beg" (Norman Whitfield, Eddie Holland) – 2:56
7. "I Put a Spell on You" (Screamin' Jay Hawkins) – 2:42
8. "Money" (Berry Gordy, Janie Bradford) – 2:33
9. "Hold On, I'm Coming" (Isaac Hayes, David Porter) – 2:41
10. "Dancing in the Street" (Marvin Gaye, Ivy Jo Hunter, Mickey Stevenson) – 2:57
11. "All the Young Dudes" (David Bowie) – 3:24
12. "Respect" (Otis Redding) – 2:35

Limited edition 2CD

1. "Rip It Up" (Robert Blackwell, John Marascalco) – 2:10
2. "I'll Go Crazy" (James Brown) – 2:46
3. "Who's Making Love" (Homer Banks, Bettye Crutcher, Don Davis, Raymond Jackson) – 3:18
4. "Is This Love" (Bob Marley) – 5:24
5. "Hound Dog" (Jerry Leiber, Mike Stoller) – 2:44

== Charts and certifications ==
=== Weekly charts ===
Soul Deeper... Songs from the Deep South debuted and peaked at number 3 in Australia.

Chart (2000/01)	Peak position
Australian Albums (ARIA)	3
New Zealand Albums (RMNZ)	15

=== Year-end charts ===
Chart (2000)	Position
ARIA Albums Chart	43

== Certifications ==
Region	Certification	Certified units/sales
Australia (ARIA)	Platinum	70,000^{^}
New Zealand (RMNZ)	Gold	7,500^{^}
^{^} Shipments figures based on certification alone.

== Personnel ==
Credits adapted from AllMusic.

- Jimmy Barnes - lead vocals
- Sweet Pea Atkinson - backing vocals
- Alexandra Brown - backing vocals
- James Gadson - drums
- Mark Lizotte - guitar
- Reggie McBride - bass
- Johnny Lee Schell - guitar
- Lee Thornburg - trombone, trumpet
- Mick Weaver - keyboards
- David Woodford - saxophone

Technical

- Dana Pilson - production coordination
- Mark Dearnley - engineering, mixing
- Howard Karp - assistant engineer
- Cameron Moss - design
- Jean Smith - photography
