= Jimmy Barnes =

Australian singer (born 1956)

Jimmy Barnes AO
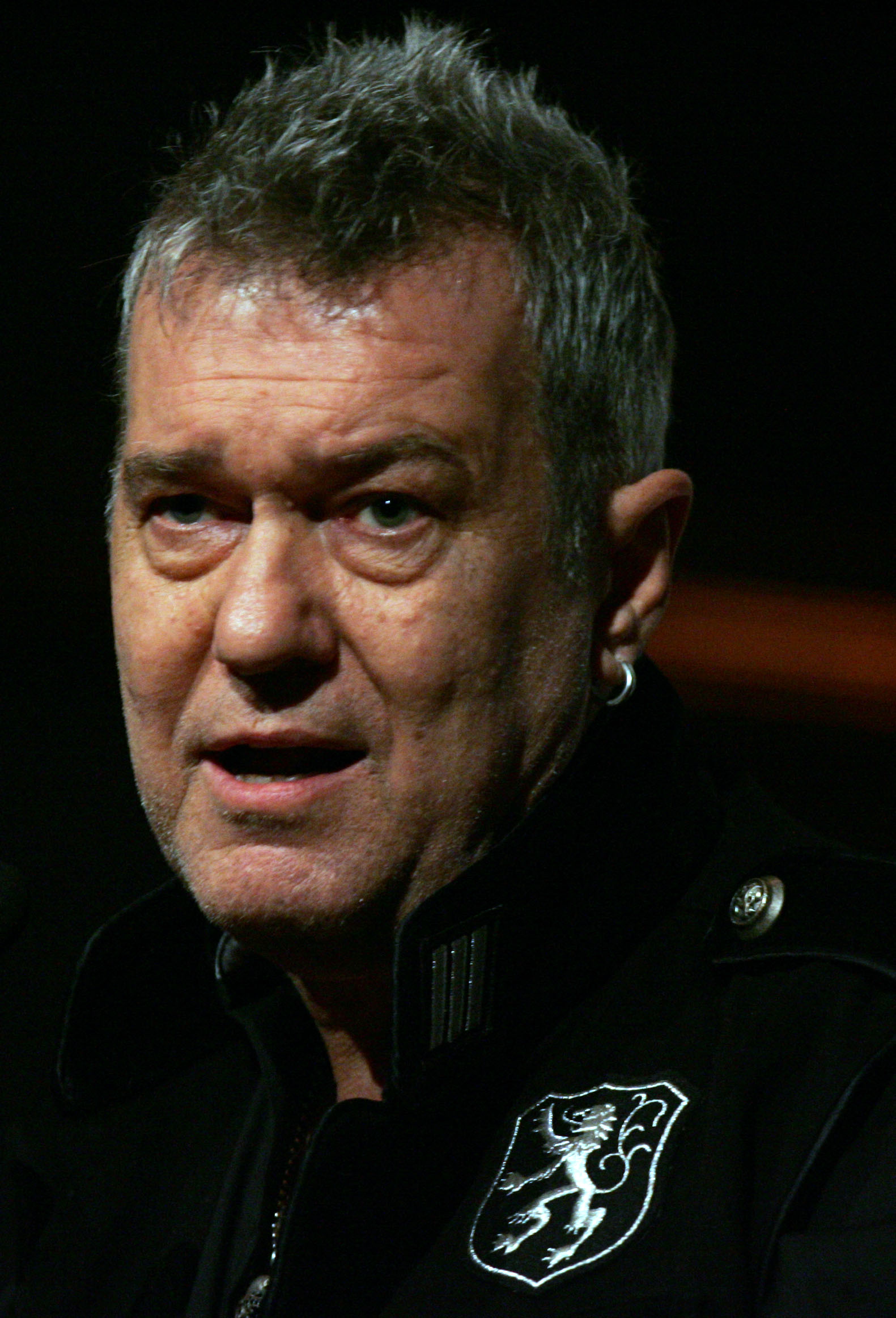
- Barnes in 2014

Background information
- Born: James Dixon Swan; 28 April 1956 (age 70); Dennistoun, Glasgow, Scotland
- Origin: Adelaide, South Australia
- Genres: Hard rock; blues rock; soul; R&B; country; country rock; electronic
- Occupations: Singer, songwriter
- Instruments: Vocals; guitar
- Years active: 1973–present
- Labels: Mushroom; Geffen; Provogue
- Member of: Cold Chisel; The Barnestormers
- Formerly of: Fraternity; Living Loud
- Spouse: Jane Mahoney (m. 1981)
- Website: jimmybarnes.com

James Dixon Barnes (né Swan; born 28 April 1956) is an Australian rock singer. His career, both as a solo performer and as the lead vocalist with the rock band Cold Chisel, has made him one of the most popular and best-selling Australian music artists of all time. By 2022 he had achieved 16 solo number-one albums in Australia, more than any other artist. In 2005 he was inducted into the ARIA Hall of Fame as a solo artist, after also having been an inductee in 1992 as a member of Cold Chisel. His music has covered many genres, including hard rock, blues rock, soul, R&B, country, country rock, and electronic.

Several of his children are musicians who have on occasion joined him on stage, including his son Jackie (a drummer), daughters Mahalia, Eliza-Jane ("EJ"), and Elly-May, and son David Campbell (all singers). His wife Jane formed the Jane Barnes Band in the family home during the COVID-19 lockdowns, which in 2023 toured Australia.

Barnes' first memoir, which told of his poverty-stricken and traumatic childhood years, Working Class Boy (2016), was followed by a sequel published the following year, Working Class Man. For these, he won the Biography of the Year award at the Australian Book Industry Awards for two consecutive years.

== Early life and education ==
Barnes was born James Dixon Swan on 28 April 1956 in Dennistoun, (Note: Some sources report his birth in Cowcaddens, but changed to Dennistoun as he said this himself in a 2016 interview.) Glasgow, to Dorothy Dixon and James Ruthven Harvey Swan. He has four siblings. His maternal grandmother was Jewish. He was raised Protestant and later became a Buddhist. Barnes has said that he recalls living in the slums of Glasgow "vividly".

The family emigrated on 7 December 1961 under the Assisted Passage Migration Scheme, arriving in Australia when he was five years old, on 21 January 1962. Another sister, Lisa, was born later that year. They originally lived in Adelaide, though they eventually settled in the satellite town (now regarded as a suburb) of Elizabeth. Jimmy's older brother John became a successful musician as founder and lead singer of the rock band Swanee. John encouraged and taught Barnes how to sing, as he was not initially interested.

Barnes' father was an alcoholic, and the children endured violence, abuse, and trauma growing up. After his parents divorced, his mother remarried, to Reg Barnes. Jimmy adopted the name James Dixon Barnes after his stepfather, as did all of the other siblings except for the eldest, John. John Dixon became the target of sexual abuse from his parents' friends' son, and left home at 13, but Barnes has said that he was one of two heroes (the other being Reg); that he "would have been killed if it weren't for him". Barnes later said "Jim Swan was my father, but Reg Barnes was my dad". He has expressed anger towards his mother, who deserted the family, leaving Reg to bring up the children.

== Cold Chisel ==
Barnes took up an apprenticeship in a foundry with the South Australian Railways in 1973, but the love he and his brother had for music led him to join a band. In 1974, his brother Swanee was playing drums with Fraternity, which had just parted ways with the singer Bon Scott. Barnes took over the role but his tenure with the band was brief and, in December 1975, he joined a harder-edged band called Orange, with the organist and songwriter Don Walker, guitarist Ian Moss, drummer Steve Prestwich, and bass guitarist Les Kaczmarek. He later said that Walker had had a profound influence on him, because "he was someone who really cared about what he was doing, and who seemed to have a plan".

In 1974, Orange had changed its name to Cold Chisel and began to develop a strong presence on the local music scene. Barnes moved to Armidale, New South Wales with the band while Walker completed his masters there, In May 1976 Cold Chisel relocated to Melbourne, but, "frustrated by their lack of progress", they moved on to Sydney in early 1977. In late 1977 WEA (later Warner Music) signed the band.

Between 1978 and 1984, Cold Chisel released five studio albums and won numerous TV Week / Countdown Awards. Barnes would frequently leave and return to the band during this period, and they did not earn enough money to live on, despite pulling huge crowds. After acrimonious arguments had developed among band members, Cold Chisel broke up in December 1983, its final performances at the Sydney Entertainment Centre running from 12 to 15 December 1983.

Cold Chisel reunited in 1997 and released Last Wave of Summer in 1998. Since then Barnes has continued to perform on and off with the band while also pursuing a solo career. In 2013 they established their own record label under which to publish their own music, and signed a deal for distribution and promotion with the Universal Music Group. In late 2024 the band did a 50th anniversary national tour, finishing with a gig at the VAILO Adelaide 500 post-race concert in Adelaide on 17 November 2024.

== Solo career ==
=== 1980s ===
Barnes launched his solo career less than a month after Cold Chisel's Last Stand tour came to an end in December 1983. He assembled a band that included Arnott, the former Fraternity bass guitar player Bruce Howe and guitarists Mal Eastick (ex-Stars) and Chris Stockley (ex-The Dingoes) and began touring and writing for a solo album. Signing to Mushroom Records, Barnes released his first single, "No Second Prize", in August 1984, which peaked at number 12 on the Australian charts. His first solo album, Bodyswerve, was produced by Mark Opitz and released in 1984. It debuted at Number One on the Australian charts.

Barnes's second album, For the Working Class Man, was released in December 1985 and included the tracks "I'd Die to Be with You Tonight" and "Working Class Man". For the Working Class Man debuted on the Australian national chart at No. 1 in December 1985 and it remained at No. 1 for seven weeks. Titled simply Jimmy Barnes in the US, the album was issued in February 1986 to tie in with the release of the Ron Howard film Gung Ho (titled Working Class Man in Australia), which used "Working Class Man".

The Jimmy Barnes band that toured Australia in support of the album included Howe and Arnott, with the keyboard player Peter Kekell, the former Rose Tattoo guitarist Robin Riley and the American guitarist Dave Amato. With the release of the album in America, Barnes and a band of Canadian musicians hand-picked by his North American management team toured with ZZ Top.

In 1986, Barnes recorded two songs with INXS, a cover version of the Easybeats' "Good Times" and "Laying Down The Law", which he co-wrote with INXS members Andrew Farriss and Michael Hutchence. Both songs appeared on soundtrack of the Joel Schumacher film The Lost Boys (1987). "Good Times" was also used as the theme song for the Australian Made series of concerts that toured the country in the summer of 1986–87. Barnes and INXS headlined, and the rest of the line-up was Mental as Anything, Divinyls, Models, The Saints, I'm Talking, and The Triffids. A concert film of this event was made by Richard Lowenstein and released later that year.

In October 1987, Barnes released "Too Much Ain't Enough Love", which became his first solo number-one single. His third album, Freight Train Heart, was released in December 1987 and peaked at number one. Freight Train Heart had moderate success outside Australia.

In November 1988, Barnes released his first solo live album, Barnestorming, which became his fourth solo number one album. A version of the Percy Sledge standard "When a Man Loves a Woman" released from the album peaked at number 3.

=== 1990s ===
In 1990, Barnes recorded his fourth studio album, which featured songwriting contributions from the likes of Desmond Child, Diane Warren and Holly Knight. Two Fires, released in August 1990. debuted at number one on the Australian chart. The album featured the top-twenty singles "Lay Down Your Guns", "Let's Make it Last All Night" and "When Your Love is Gone".

In November 1991, Barnes released his fifth studio album, Soul Deep, an album of soul covers. Barnes had long fostered a love for soul and for black music, naming his children after influential black artists and including songs by Sam Cooke and Percy Sledge on previous albums. Soul Deep became Barnes's sixth Australian number-one album and included the track "When Something Is Wrong with My Baby" with John Farnham.

In March 1993, Barnes released Heat, which was influenced by the then-current grunge trend and by the music of the Red Hot Chili Peppers. Heat peaked at number two on the ARIA charts, becoming Barnes's first solo album not to peak at number one. The album contained the song "Stone Cold", written by former Cold Chisel bandmate Don Walker. It marked the first time Jimmy Barnes had worked with any member of his old band for almost a decade. The pair teamed up for an acoustic version of the track for an unplugged album Flesh and Wood, which was released in December 1993 and peaked at number two. The album included a version, recorded with The Badloves, of The Band's "The Weight", which became a top-ten hit. Also in 1993, Barnes teamed up with Tina Turner for a duet version of "The Best" in the form of a TV promotion for rugby league's Winfield Cup. The single also reached the top ten in 1993.

In the mid-1990s, Barnes's career suffered a slump. He faced financial ruin as his music-publishing company Dirty Sheet Music and his wife's children's fashion label both went broke. The family sold their property in Bowral, in the Southern Highlands of NSW, and settled for some time in Aix-en-Provence, France, attracting some adverse publicity when Barnes assaulted a television crew from Channel 7. While there, Barnes did considerable live work throughout Britain and toured with the Rolling Stones.

In June 1995, Barnes released his eighth studio album, Psyclone, which peaked at number 2 in Australia and featured the top-twenty single "Change of Heart".

In September 1996, Barnes released "Lover Lover", which peaked at number 6 on the singles chart. This was followed in October 1996 with Barnes's first greatest-hits compilation, Barnes Hits Anthology, which became Barnes's seventh solo number-one album.

In 1998, Cold Chisel reformed and Barnes returned to Australia with his family after three years in France. In March 1999 Barnes performed the 1978 Sylvester hit "You Make Me Feel (Mighty Real)" live onstage at the Sydney Gay and Lesbian Mardi Gras annual party.

Later that year Barnes released the heavy-rock single "Love and Hate", followed by its parent album Love and Fear. An autobiographical record combining hard rock with electronic music, Love and Fear was Barnes's first album to miss the Australian top ten, peaking at number 22.

=== 2000s ===
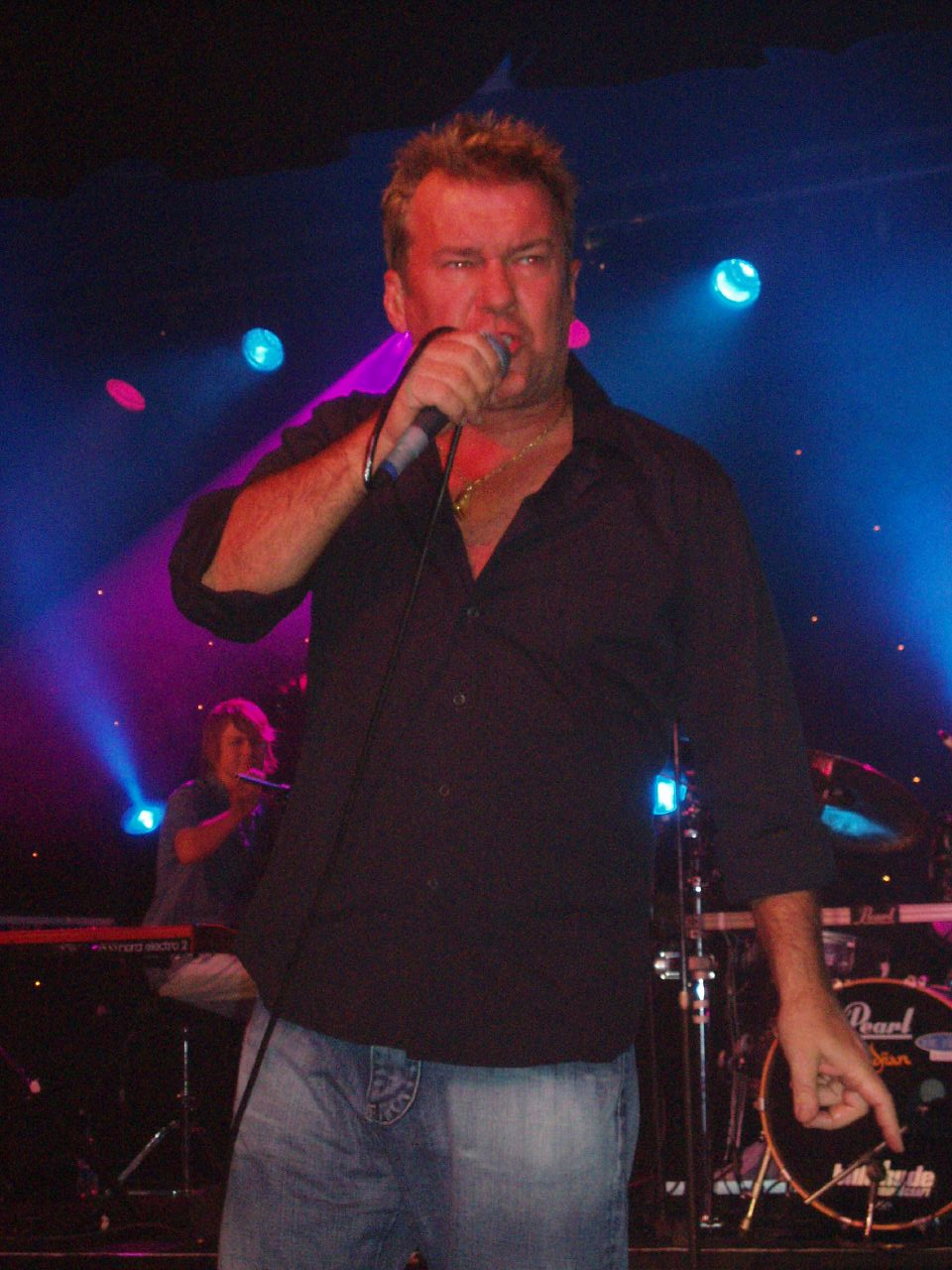
Barnes performing in 2006

In October 2000, Barnes performed at the closing ceremony of the Sydney Olympics. In November 2000, Barnes released a second album of soul tunes, titled Soul Deeper... Songs From the Deep South. The album peaked at number 3 on the ARIA charts. A number of live albums followed with little commercial success.

In 2004, Barnes recorded an album with Deep Purple guitarist Steve Morse, Uriah Heep drummer Lee Kerslake, bass player Bob Daisley and keyboard player Don Airey under the name Living Loud. The self-titled album featured a number of songs originally written and recorded with Ozzy Osbourne by Kerslake, Daisley, and Airey.

In July 2005, Barnes released his eleventh studio album, Double Happiness, which debuted at number one on the ARIA Charts. Double Happiness was an album of duets, including several with his children, daughters Mahalia and Elly-May, sons Jackie Barnes and David Campbell. After its initial success, it was re-released as a double CD/DVD package featuring many of his duets from previous albums, including those with INXS, John Farnham, Joe Cocker, and Tina Turner.

In September 2007 he started recording his twelfth studio album, Out in the Blue. Produced by Nash Chambers at Barnes' own studio Freight Train Studios, it was released on 24 November 2007. The songs were written while he recovered from his heart surgery, and was described as a change in direction, "very much a rootsy, rock album with rockabilly shuffles, powerful ballads and flat chat rock & roll". "When Two Hearts Collide" is a duet with Kasey Chambers, and other musicians featured on the album include Jim Moginie (Midnight Oil), Mark Punch, and Chris Haigh, as well as his four children Mahalia, EJ, Jackie, and Elly-May.

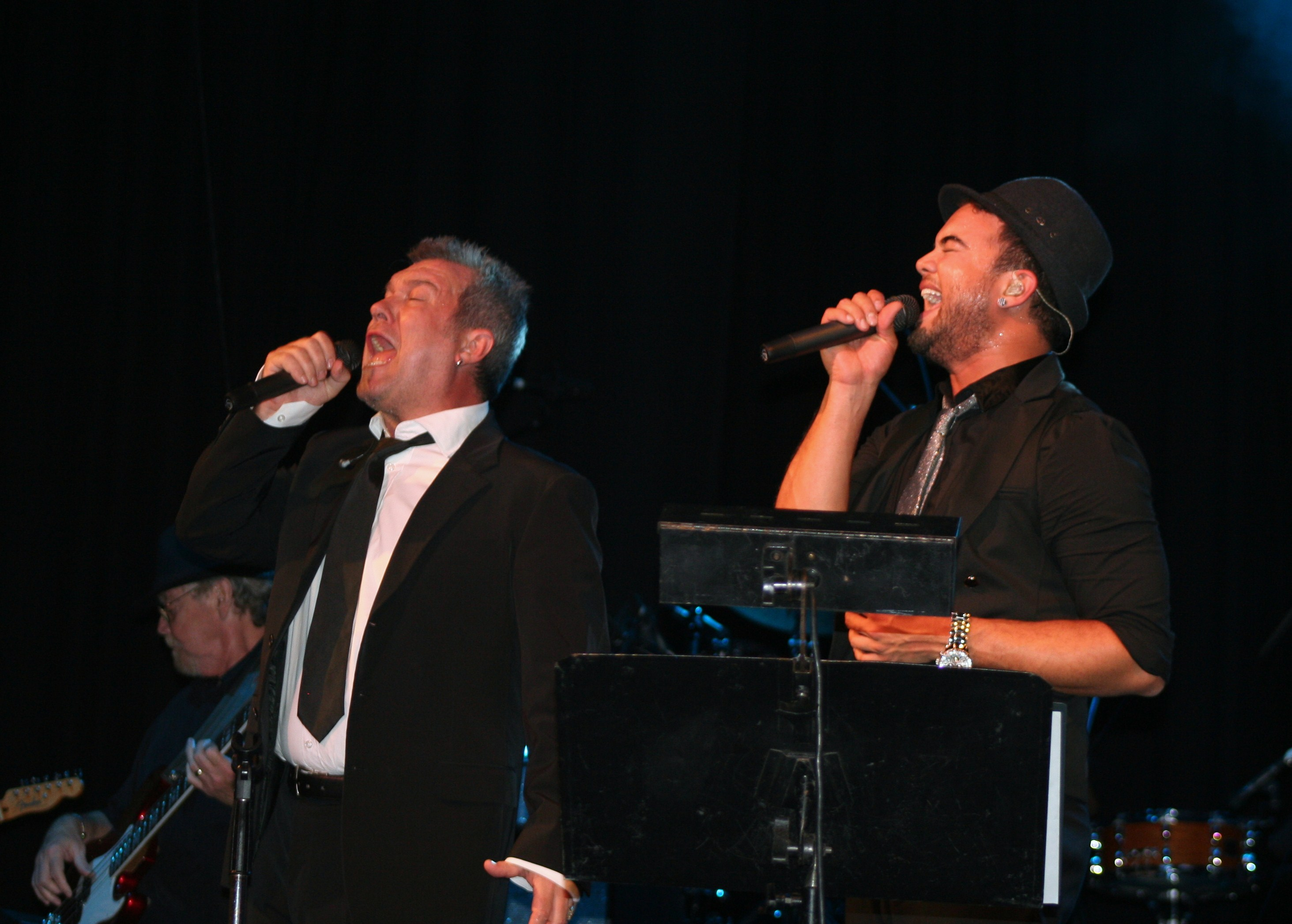
Barnes with Guy Sebastian, 6 March 2008, State Theatre

In March 2008, Barnes appeared as a special guest during soul singer Guy Sebastian's tour.

November 2008 saw the release of a duet with son David Campbell, a cover of The Righteous Brothers' "You've Lost That Lovin' Feeling" that featured on Campbell's album Good Lovin'.

In September 2009, Barnes released his thirteenth studio album The Rhythm and the Blues which became Barnes's ninth Australian number one album; thus giving him more No. 1 albums than any other Australian artist.

=== 2010s ===
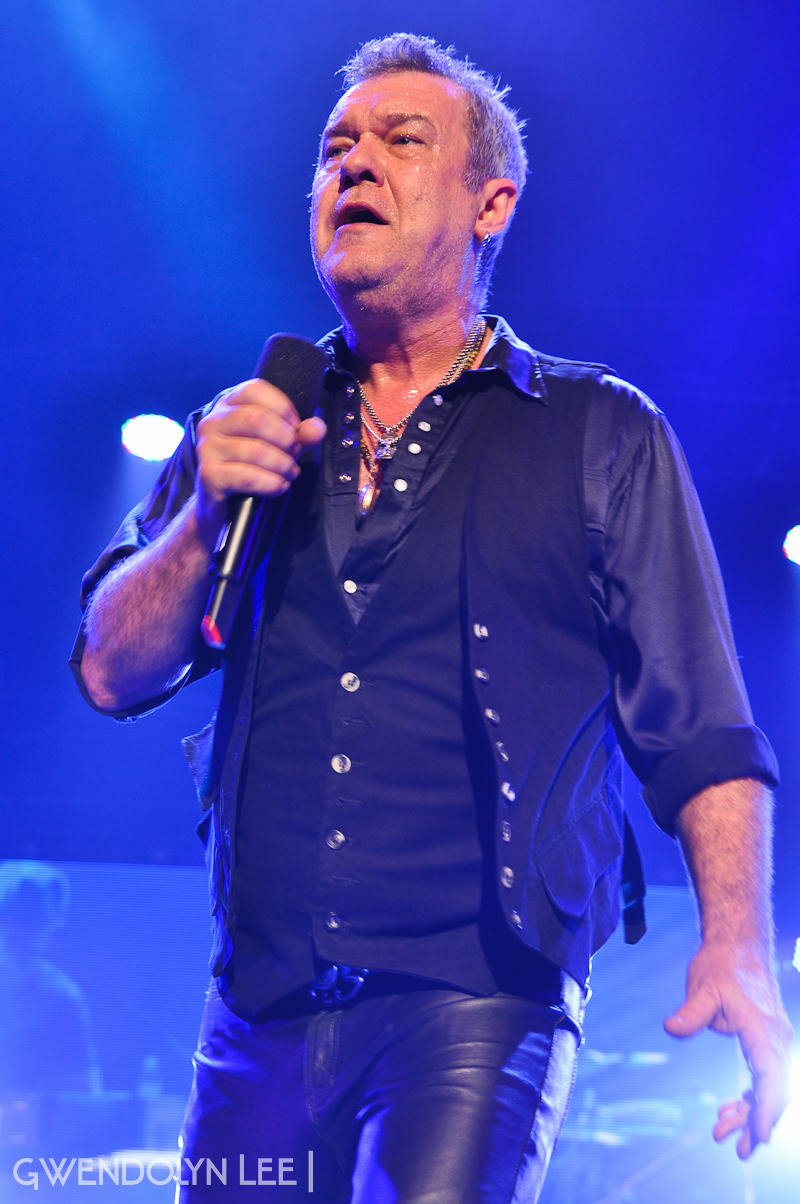
Barnes with Cold Chisel in 2012

In August 2010, Barnes released his 14th solo studio album, Rage and Ruin. Barnes stated that the ideas for most of the lyrics and song themes came from a journal he kept during a period in his life (late 1990s to early 2000s) when he struggled with drug and alcohol addiction. Rage and Ruin debuted at number 3 on the ARIA Charts on 5 September 2010.

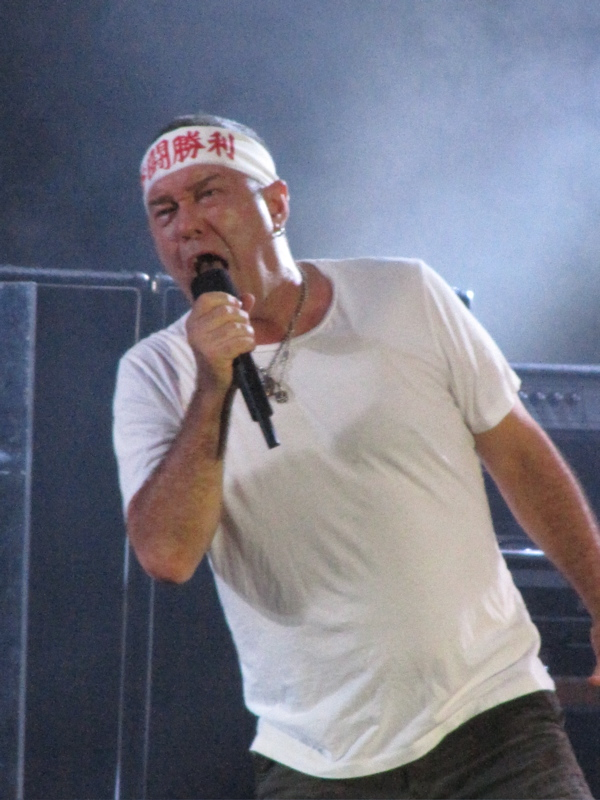
Barnes performing in 2011

Barnes headlined at Celebrate in the Park, playing a 90-minute set which included his solo hits and some Cold Chisel greats. He was joined by daughter Mahalia in a soulful rendition of "When the War Is Over", which he dedicated to the memory of Steve Prestwich.

In August 2014, Barnes released 30:30 Hindsight, an anniversary album celebrating 30 years since his chart-topping debut solo album, Bodyswerve. The album debuted at No. 1 in Australia, becoming Barnes's 10th solo No. 1 album.

In 2015, Barnes asked the Reclaim Australia Political Party to stop playing his music at their rallies. In July 2015, it was announced that Barnes would release Best of the Soul Years compilation. The album would be compiled of soul and R&B classics, from his three soul albums; "Soul Deep" (1991), "Soul Deeper" (2000) and "The Rhythm and the Blues" (2009). A fourth album of soul covers was released in June 2016 called, Soul Searchin', which became Barnes's 11th number one album in Australia and tied Barnes the equal second-most (with Madonna and U2) of all time behind The Beatles at 14.

In 2017, he featured in the song "Big Enough" by Kirin J. Callinan, alongside Alex Cameron and Molly Lewis. In addition to this, his cameo in the song's music video became a popular internet meme in late 2017. In March of the same year, Barnes released a children's album called Och Aye the G'nu. It won the ARIA Award for Best Children's Album at the ARIA Music Awards of 2017, although the brand that appeared on the album, as well as the poetry books that were released on the first of April are related to The Wiggles.

In January 2019, Barnes announced his forthcoming eighteenth solo studio album, My Criminal Record. It was released on 17 May 2019. It was Barnes's 12th solo number-one album, and 16th when including releases with Cold Chisel on the Australian albums chart, making him the artist with the most chart-topping albums in Australian chart history, having previously tied at 11 number ones with Madonna and U2. At the APRA Music Awards of 2020, "Shutting Down Our Town" was nominated for Most Performed Rock Work of the Year.

=== 2020s ===
Barnes' next album, Flesh and Blood, was released in July 2021, and debuted at No.1 on the ARIA chart. The album, written with brother-in-law Diesel and Cold Chisel bandmate Don Walker, included duets with Barnes' wife, Jane, and his children Jackie, Elly-May and Eliza Jane Barnes.

In April 2022, Barnes announced the forthcoming release of Soul Deep 30, celebrating the 30th anniversary of Soul Deep, alongside a national tour. The album debuted at number one on the ARIA chart later that year. In November 2022, Barnes released his first Christmas album, Blue Christmas. It became his fifteenth number-one solo album.

In March 2023, Barnes announced the formation of rockabilly supergroup The Barnestormers, featuring Barnes, Chris Cheney, Slim Jim Phantom, Jools Holland and Kevin Shirley. A self-titled album was released on 26 May 2023, and reached No.3 on the ARIA chart.

In June 2025, Barnes released his 21st studio album, Defiant. It debuted at No.1 on the ARIA chart, making it his 16th solo number one album. Combined with Cold Chisel, his total of 22 number one albums gives Barnes the record for the most chart-topping albums by any artist in Australian history.

== Freight Train Studios ==
Barnes' Freight Train Studios were originally located at Bowral, later moving to Botany in Sydney.

Among others, the following albums were recorded in the studio:

- Hey Rudolph! (The Tin Lids, 2006); a collection of Christmas carols
- Out in the Blue (2007)
- Rage and Ruin (also at Conway Recording Studio A, Los Angeles, and Woodcliff Studios, Sherman Oaks (LA)

== Other activities ==
In 1992 Barnes worked with his friend Mandawuy Yunupingu, frontman of Yothu Yindi, on a project called "Sister Schools", the aim of which was to ensure that "schools with few or no Aboriginal children will forge educational and social links with schools with large numbers of Aboriginal children, in an attempt to foster tolerance and understanding". Before the launch of the project, "the Yunupingu kids" (Mandawuy's children) recorded a song written by Yunupingu called "School" with Barnes' children in their band The Tin Lids. As part of the project, endorsed by the government, schools with few or no Aboriginal children would forge educational and social links with schools with many Aboriginal children, by exchanging letters, photographs, and other media. Around 100 schools expressed interest in the project, which was launched in August 1992 by connecting the school in Yirrkala with Gib Gate Primary School near Mittagong in New South Wales. In 1994, a primary school in Deloraine, Tasmania, hosted a group of children from Ali Curung, NT, for six days as part of the scheme.

In late 2006, Barnes became patron of the Choir of Hard Knocks, a choral group formed by Jonathon Welch and consisting of homeless and disadvantaged people in Melbourne. The formation of the choir was documented by the ABC as a five-part series aired in May 2007. Barnes has regularly performed "Flame Trees" with the choir at their concerts.

On 14 March 2011 he planted a flame tree, made famous in Cold Chisel's 1984 song "Flame Trees", at the National Arboretum Canberra.

Barnes also guest-starred in episode 2 of season 2 of the television comedy series These New South Whales in 2018.

== Personal life ==
=== Family ===
In November 1979, Barnes met Jane Mahoney, the stepdaughter of an Australian diplomat whose mother was Thai. Mahoney had spent the first five years of her life living with extended family in Bangkok. Her mother, Phorn, was one of 26 children, and her grandmother was one of seven wives. Her grandfather was a rich businessman who had left two Chinese wives behind when he moved from China to Thailand just before the Communist Revolution of China. Phorn was sent to boarding school in England. She met and married Thai man Suvit Dejakasaya, and the couple had three children before divorcing four years later. Soon afterwards, Phorn met and married Australian diplomat John Mahoney, and moved to Canberra with him. The family moved around following her father's postings, living in Italy, Russia, New Guinea, Kiribati, Malta, and Malaysia. Jane studied pure mathematics, comparative religion, art history, psychology, and five languages at The University of Canberra, and met Barnes in November 1979. Eventually, she dropped out of university and moved to Sydney to be with him, and they married in May 1981.

Barnes has eight children: four with his wife Jane (including Mahalia, Jackie and Elly-May; all musically known as The Tin Lids). Before that, his eldest son, David Campbell, was born of a teenage relationship with Kim Campbell. He has said about his relationship with David's mother Kim that they were just two scared children who were being beaten and abused at home, and not ready to bring up a child. David's grandmother raised him, although Barnes was at first told that he had been adopted. He also has three daughters from three other relationships. In 2010, he met two of them Amanda for the first time, and accepted them into his family as soon as paternity had been confirmed.

Barnes is brother-in-law to fellow musician and long-time collaborator Diesel.

After Barnes played in Darwin in 1991 and met Mandawuy Yunupingu, frontman of Yothu Yindi, Barnes was "adopted" as a white brother into the Yunupingu clan, based on the Gove Peninsula in east Arnhem Land in the Northern Territory.

=== Jane Barnes Band ===
During the COVID-19 pandemic in Australia, with social distancing and lockdowns enforced to prevent the spread of the disease, Jane Barnes learned how to play the guitar and she and Jimmy, sometimes along with various family members, started the Jane Barnes Band, performing in their lounge room and sharing videos on social media. They proved so popular that the band, later joined by other musicians, went on tour in 2023, and also appeared on Sunrise on Channel 7. Jane sang and as well as playing guitar, played bagpipes and tin flute,

=== Health ===
By around the 2000s, both Jane and Jimmy Barnes were not coping, and addicted to alcohol and drugs. Their children, then in their late teens and early twenties, staged an intervention which led their parents to going into rehab and kicking their habits.

Barnes underwent heart surgery in February 2007. On 7 July 2007 Barnes was a presenter at the Australian leg of Live Earth. In August he became a regular presenter on The Know, a pop culture program on the pay-TV channel MAX and has also been a presenter of the Planet Rock program on the Austereo network.

On 28 November 2023, Barnes announced via Instagram that he was being treated in hospital for a bacterial infection. He remained in hospital for two weeks; on 12 December he announced, also via Instagram, that he was undergoing open heart surgery due to the infection having spread to an already-weakened valve.

=== Autobiographies ===
In 2016, Barnes published his autobiography, Working Class Boy, which explored his traumatic childhood experiences.

In November 2017, Barnes published a second memoir; a sequel to Working Class Boy titled Working Class Man. On 3 May 2018, Barnes won the biography of the year award at the Australian Book Industry Awards for the second year in a row.

His autobiography Working Class Boy was adapted into a film by Universal Pictures. Directed by Mark Joffe, the film premiered in Australian cinemas on 23 August 2018. A soundtrack was released on 17 August 2018.

=== Beliefs and politics ===
Barnes labels himself as "sort of Buddhist", and describes himself as a socialist. He is a supporter of the Australian Labor Party, as well as rugby league team Wests Tigers, and the Port Adelaide Football Club.

== Discography ==
=== Solo ===
- Bodyswerve (1984)
- For the Working Class Man (1985)
- Freight Train Heart (1987)
- Two Fires (1990)
- Soul Deep (1991)
- Heat (1993)
- Flesh and Wood (1993)
- Psyclone (1995)
- Love and Fear (1999)
- Soul Deeper... Songs From the Deep South (2000)
- Double Happiness (2005)
- Out in the Blue (2007)
- The Rhythm and the Blues (2009)
- Rage and Ruin (2010)
- 30:30 Hindsight (2014)
- Soul Searchin' (2016)
- Och Aye the G'nu (2017, with The Wiggles)
- Working Class Boy (2018)
- My Criminal Record (2019)
- Flesh and Blood (2021)
- Blue Christmas (2022)
- Defiant (2025)

=== With Cold Chisel ===
- Cold Chisel (1978)
- Breakfast at Sweethearts (1979)
- East (1980)
- Circus Animals (1982)
- Twentieth Century (1984)
- The Last Wave of Summer (1998)
- No Plans (2012)
- The Perfect Crime (2015)
- Blood Moon (2019)

=== With Living Loud ===
- Living Loud (2004)

=== With The Barnestormers ===
- The Barnestormers (2023)

== Written works ==
=== Written works by Jimmy Barnes ===
As of November 2024 Barnes has written six books. He is the only author to win back-to-back Australian Book Industry Awards for a non-fiction title. His first two books sold over 500,000 copies.

written works by Jimmy Barnes
Title	Details	Notes
Working Class Boy	Released: September 2016; Publisher: HarperCollins	Jimmy Barnes's childhood memoir; Number one bestseller and won the Australian Book Industry Award (ABIA) for Biography of the Year in 2017.
Working Class Man	Released: October 2017; Publisher: HarperCollins	The sequel to Working Class Boy. Jimmy Barnes's adult memoir; Number one bestseller and won the Australian Book Industry Award (ABIA) for Biography of the Year in 2018.
Killing Time	Released: October 2020; Publisher: HarperCollins	Non-fiction short stories of adventure and love and loss.; Number one bestseller.
Rosie the Rhinoceros	Released: September 2021; Publisher: HarperCollins	Children's book, inspired by his granddaughter Rosie.; Illustrated by Matt Shanks
Where the River Bends (with Jane Barnes)	Released: November 2021; Publisher: HarperCollins	A recipe book, accompanied by personal anecdotes and personal photography.
Highways and Byways: Tall Tales and Short Stories	Released: October 2024; Publisher: HarperCollins	Non-fiction short stories of adventure.; Number one bestseller.
Seasons Where The River Bends (with Jane Barnes)	Released: October 2025; Publisher: HarperCollins	A follow-up to Where the River Bends

=== Written works featuring Jimmy Barnes ===
written works featuring Jimmy Barnes
Title	Details	Notes
The Wiggles - Och Aye the G’Nu	Released: April 2017; Publisher: Bonnier Publishing Australia	Features a poem written by Jimmy Barnes.
The Wiggles - The Recorded Poems of Och Aye the G'nu (with bonus CD)	Released: April 2017; Publisher: Bonnier Publishing Australia	7 poems written by Barnes for his grandchildren. A companion piece to the album of the same name

== Recognition, honours, and awards ==
Barnes' career, both as a solo performer and as the lead vocalist with Cold Chisel, has made him one of the most popular and best-selling Australian music artists of all time.

In 2017 Barnes was appointed an Officer of the Order of Australia for distinguished service to the performing arts as a musician, singer and songwriter, and through support for not-for-profit organisations, particularly to children with a disability.

=== AIR Awards ===
The Australian Independent Record Awards (commonly known informally as AIR Awards) is an annual awards night to recognise, promote and celebrate the success of Australia's Independent Music sector.

Year	Nominee / work	Award	Result	Ref.
2022	Flesh and Blood	Best Independent Rock Album or EP	Nominated	

=== APRA Awards ===
The APRA Awards are held in Australia and New Zealand by the Australasian Performing Right Association to recognise songwriting skills, sales and airplay performance by its members annually.

Year	Nominee / work	Award	Result
2016	(Jimmy Barnes as part of) Cold Chisel	Ted Albert Award for Outstanding Services to Australian Music	Awarded
2020	"Shutting Down Our Town" (featuring Troy Cassar-Daley)	Most Performed Rock Work	Won
2022	"Flesh and Blood"	Most Performed Rock Work	Nominated
2023	"Around in Circles"	Most Performed Rock Work	Nominated
2026	"Defiant"	Most Performed Rock Work	Nominated

=== ARIA Awards ===
Barnes has won seven Australian Recording Industry Association (ARIA) Awards, including his induction into their Hall of Fame in 2005. As a member of Cold Chisel, he had also been inducted into the ARIA Hall of Fame in 1992.

Year	Award	Nominee/work	Result
1987	Best Male Artist	"Good Times" (with INXS)	Nominated
1987	Single of the Year	"Good Times" (with INXS)	Nominated
1987	Highest Selling Single	"Good Times" (with INXS)	Nominated
1987	Producer of the Year	Mark Opitz for INXS & Jimmy Barnes – "Good Times"	Won
1989	Best Male Artist	Barnestorming	Won
1991	Best Male Artist	Two Fires	Nominated
1992	Album of the Year	Soul Deep	Nominated
1992	Best Male Artist	Soul Deep	Won
1992	Highest Selling Album	Soul Deep	Won
1992	Best Cover Art	Soul Deep	Nominated
1992	Single of the Year	"When Something Is Wrong with My Baby" (with John Farnham)	Nominated
1992	Highest Selling Single	"When Something Is Wrong with My Baby" (with John Farnham)	Nominated
1993	Best Male Artist	"Ain't No Mountain High Enough"	Nominated
1994	Best Male Artist	Flesh and Wood	Nominated
1994	Highest Selling Album	Flesh and Wood	Nominated
1994	Single of the Year	"Stone Cold"	Nominated
1997	Highest Selling Album	Hits	Nominated
1997	Best Male Artist	"Lover Lover"	Nominated
2005	Hall of Fame	Jimmy Barnes	Inductee
2008	Best Adult Contemporary Album	Out in the Blue	Nominated
2009	Best Music DVD	Live at the Enmore	Nominated
2010	Best Adult Contemporary Album	The Rhythm and the Blues	Nominated
2014	Best Rock Album	30:30 Hindsight	Nominated
2016	Best Blues and Roots Album	Soul Searchin'	Nominated
2017	Best Children's Album	Och Aye The G'Nu!	Won
2018	Best Original Soundtrack or Musical Theatre Cast Album	Working Class Boy: The Soundtracks	Won
2019	Best Rock Album	My Criminal Record	Nominated

=== Country Music Awards of Australia ===
The Country Music Awards of Australia (CMAA) (also known as the Golden Guitar Awards) is an annual awards night held in January during the Tamworth Country Music Festival, celebrating recording excellence in the Australian country music industry. They have been held annually since 1973.

Year	Nominee / work	Award	Result
2006	"Birds on a Wire" (with Troy Cassar-Daley)	Vocal Collaboration of the Year	Won

=== Helpmann Awards ===
The Helpmann Awards is an awards show, celebrating live entertainment and performing arts in Australia, presented by industry group Live Performance Australia since 2001. Note: 2020 and 2021 were cancelled due to the COVID-19 pandemic.

Year	Nominee / work	Award	Result	Ref.
2015	30:30 Hindsight Greatest Hits Tour 2014	Best Australian Contemporary Concert	Nominated	
2017	Working Class Boy: An Evening of Stories & Songs	Best Cabaret Performer	Nominated	

=== Rolling Stone Australia Awards ===
The Rolling Stone Australia Awards are awarded annually in January or February by the Australian edition of Rolling Stone magazine for outstanding contributions to popular culture in the previous year.

Year	Nominee / work	Award	Result	Ref.
2022	Jimmy Barnes	Rolling Stone Readers' Choice Award	Nominated	

=== TV Week / Countdown Awards ===
Countdown was an Australian pop music TV series on national broadcaster ABC-TV from 1974 to 1987, it presented music awards from 1979 to 1987, initially in conjunction with magazine TV Week. The TV Week / Countdown Awards were a combination of popular-voted and peer-voted awards.

Year	Nominee / work	Award	Result
1980	himself	Most Popular Male Performer	Nominated
1984	himself	Best Male Performance in a Video	Won
1984	himself	Best Songwriter	Nominated
1985	himself – "Working Class Man"	Best Male Performance in a Video	Won
1986	himself & INXS "Good Times"	Best Group Performance in a Video	Nominated
1986	himself – "Ride the Night Away"	Best Male Performance in a Video	Nominated
