= Jackie Barnes =

Australian musician

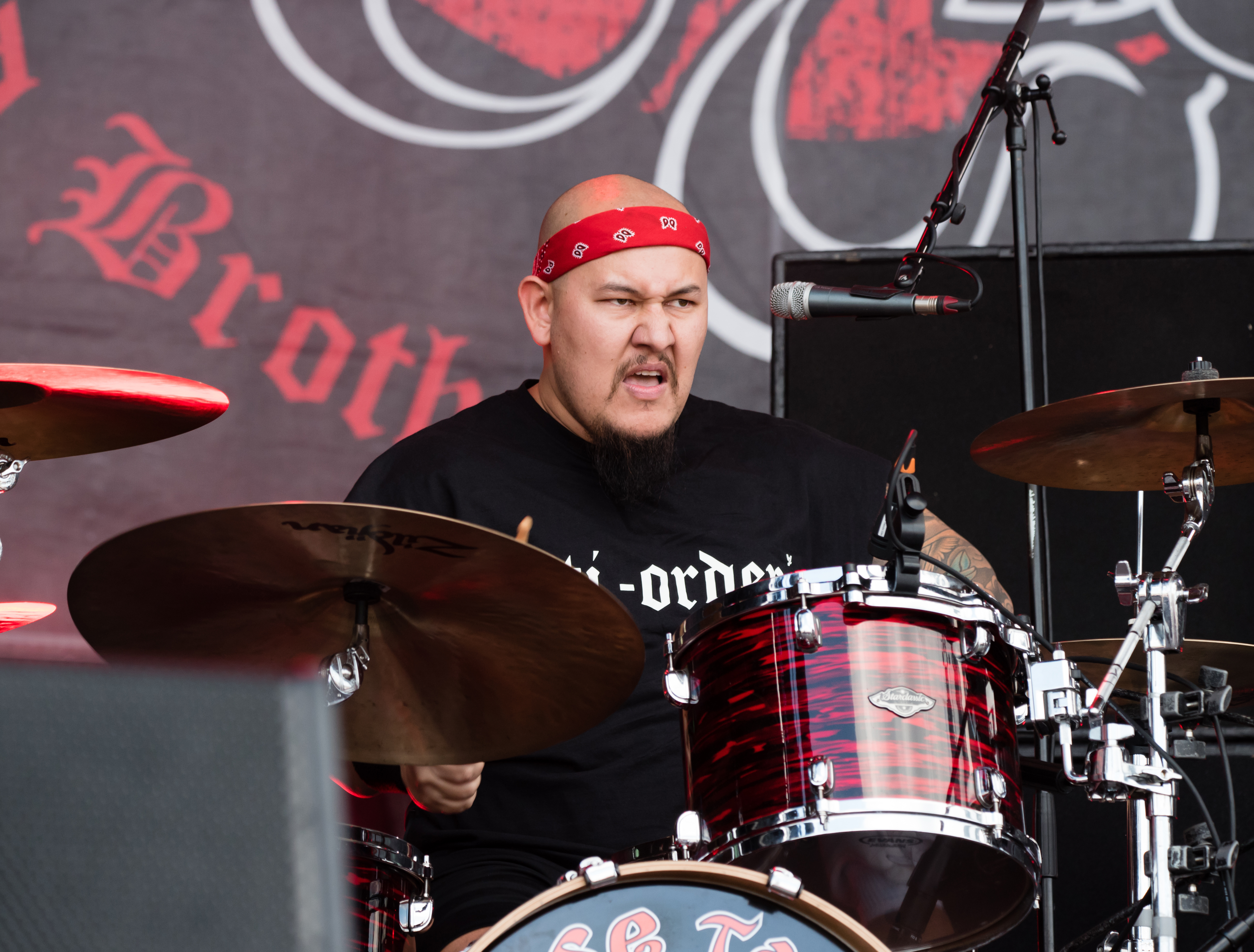
- Barnes with Rose Tattoo in 2018

Background information
- Born: Jackie James Barnes; Sydney, Australia
- Genres: Rock, blues, funk, world, pop
- Occupation: Musician
- Instruments: Drums, vocals, keyboards
- Years active: 1991–present
- Website: jackiebarnes.com.au

Jackie James Barnes is an Australian drummer and singer. He is the current drummer for Jimmy Barnes and The John Butler Trio. He is the third child and only son of Jimmy Barnes and his wife Jane.

== Early life and education ==
Born in Sydney, Jackie James Barnes is the third child and only son of Jimmy Barnes and his wife Jane. His sisters are Mahalia, Eliza-Jane "E.J.", and Elly-May Barnes. Jackie Barnes was born while his father was touring the US with ZZ Top, and was named after soul singer Jackie Wilson. He is of Scottish descent through his father, and Thai descent through his mother.

His half-brother is Jimmy Barnes' oldest child, singer and actor David Campbell, and he also has three half-sisters.

When he was four, he joined older sisters Eliza-Jane "E.J." and Mahalia for the recording sessions of their father's Two Fires album. Their voices are among the children's choir that features on the track "When Your Love is Gone". From the age of five he formed part of the children's singing group the Tin Lids with sisters Eliza-Jane 'E.J.', Elly-May and Mahalia. The Tin Lids recorded three albums between 1991 and 1994, all of which achieved platinum sales. One of their albums, Snakes & Ladders (1992), was nominated for the ARIA Award for Best Children's Album in 1993.

After finishing high school, Barnes began touring with his father as keyboardist. In 2005, Barnes successfully auditioned for the position of drummer and backing vocalist in the Jimmy Barnes Band and toured nationally and internationally with the band. He recorded the song "Same Woman" as a duet with father on the 2005 album Double Happiness that topped the ARIA charts.

In 2010 he graduated with a Bachelor of Music majoring in drum performance at Berklee College of Music in Boston, Massachusetts, US, in 2010.

== Career ==
In addition to working with his father, Barnes has worked with many artists, including Diesel, Keith Urban, Jonathan Cain, Neal Schon, Steve Morse, Joe Bonamassa, Andrew Roachford, Steve Van Zandt, The Dead Daisies, The Wiggles, and Glenn Hughes.

He recorded the drums on the 2007 Jimmy Barnes album Out in the Blue as well as on the DVD Max Sessions- Live at the Sydney Opera House and then in 2008 he played drums on the Jimmy Barnes Live at the Enmore DVD.

In 2013, Barnes toured worldwide with Australian classical/pop group the Ten Tenors. He then joined Los Angeles-based rock outfit Heaven and Earth and toured Europe extensively, including the Montreux Jazz Festival in Switzerland. In 2014 he joined third series winner Reece Mastin on his Wolf in the Woods tour around Australia, as well as recording and touring father Jimmy Barnes' album 30:30 Hindsight, a collaborative album to commemorate Jimmy's 30th year as a solo performer.

In early 2015 Barnes joined rock supergroup the Dead Daisies to record their album Revoluciòn. Later that year he started playing drums for the Australian blues/funk band the Lachy Doley Group.

From 2016 Barnes started working with children's music group the Wiggles, recording drums on all of their releases, including their back catalogue, and has also co-written music for them. He worked on the Wiggles/Jimmy Barnes album Och Aye the G'nu (released March 2017), on which his sisters Mahalia and Elly-May provided vocals, among others. The album won the 2017 ARIA Award for Best Children's Album.

In August 2018, Jackie joined Rose Tattoo for the band's European tour.
