= Soul Deep (Jimmy Barnes album) =

1991 studio album by Jimmy Barnes

Studio album by Jimmy Barnes
- Released: 4 November 1991
- Studio: Freight Train (Bowral, Australia)
- Genre: Soul
- Length: 40:20
- Label: Mushroom
- Producer: Don Gehman

Jimmy Barnes chronology
Two Fires (1990)	Soul Deep (1991)	Heat (1993)

Singles from Soul Deep
- 1. "I Gotcha" Released: 23 September 1991; 2. "When Something Is Wrong with My Baby" Released: 28 October 1991; 3. "Ain't No Mountain High Enough" Released: 13 January 1992

Jimmy Barnes chronology
Flesh and Blood (2021)	Soul Deep 30 (2022)	Blue Christmas (2022)

Singles from Soul Deep 30
- 1. "Soothe Me" Released: 22 April 2022; 2. "Do You Love Me" Released: 6 May 2022

Soul Deep is the fifth studio album by Australian rock singer Jimmy Barnes. It was his sixth consecutive Australian No. 1 album. The album is a collection of soul covers and featured duets with John Farnham and Diesel. A special edition was later released in a black fold-out cover with embossed gold lettering and included five bonus live tracks and a set of collector cards.

== Soul Deep 30 ==
The album was reissued for its 30th anniversary on 17 June 2022, titled Soul Deep 30. It includes the 12 original Soul Deep recordings, with four new songs (two placed before the original 12 tracks, and two after). A limited deluxe physical edition includes the 1991 Soul Deep Live at the Palais concert on CD and DVD. The album debuted at number one on the ARIA Albums Chart on 24 June 2022.

== Track listing ==
No.	Title	Writer(s)	Length
1.	"I Gotcha"	Joe Tex	3:29
2.	"(Your Love Keeps Lifting Me) Higher and Higher"	Gary Jackson; Raynard Miner; Carl Smith	3:04
3.	"When Something Is Wrong with My Baby" (with John Farnham)	Isaac Hayes; David Porter	4:56
4.	"Show Me"	Joe Tex	3:28
5.	"Many Rivers to Cross"	Jimmy Cliff	3:07
6.	"Reflections"	Brian Holland; Lamont Dozier; Eddie Holland	3:05
7.	"Ain't No Mountain High Enough"	Nickolas Ashford; Valerie Simpson	2:23
8.	"I Found a Love"	Wilson Pickett; Willie Schofield; Robert West	3:05
9.	"Signed, Sealed, Delivered I'm Yours"	Stevie Wonder; Lee Garrett; Syreeta Wright; Lula Mae Hardaway	2:52
10.	"Bring It On Home to Me"	Sam Cooke	3:21
11.	"Here I Am (Come and Take Me)"	Al Green; Teenie Hodges	3:51
12.	"River Deep – Mountain High"	Phil Spector; Jeff Barry; Ellie Greenwich	3:39
Total length:			40:20

2004 reissue bonus live tracks
No.	Title	Writer(s)	Length
13.	"Respect"	Otis Redding	2:40
14.	"Reach Out I'll Be There"	Brian Holland, Lamont Dozier and Eddie Holland	3:40
15.	"Try a Little Tenderness"	Harry M. Woods; Jimmy Campbell and Reg Connelly	4:24
16.	"Stagger Lee"	Lloyd Price; Harold Logan	3:16
17.	"Sweet Soul Music"	Sam Cooke; Arthur Conley; Otis Redding	3:44
Total length:			58:04

Soul Deep 30 bonus tracks (original album from tracks 3–14)
No.	Title	Writer(s)	Length
1.	"Soothe Me" (with Sam Moore)	Sam Cooke	3:31
2.	"Do You Love Me" (with Josh Teskey)	Berry Gordy Jr.	3:30
15.	"Reflections" (with Ian Moss)	B. Holland; Dozier; E. Holland	3:33
16.	"I Gotcha" (rock version)	Joe Tex	4:24
Total length:			55:18

=== Live at the Palais 1991 DVD ===
Barnes toured Australia with Soul Deep and recorded the concert at Melbourne's Palais Theatre. It was released on VHS, and later, DVD. The DVD and audio of the concert on CD was later included with a limited deluxe edition of the Soul Deep 30 reissue.

1. "(Your Love Keeps Lifting Me) Higher and Higher"
2. "Respect"
3. "Ain't No Mountain High Enough"
4. "Here I Am (Come and Take Me)"
5. "Signed Sealed Delivered (I'm Yours)"
6. "I Found a Love"
7. "Reach Out I'll Be There"
8. "Many Rivers to Cross"
9. "Show Me"
10. "Try a Little Tenderness"
11. "Stagger Lee"
12. "Bring It On Home to Me" (with Diesel)
13. "Sister Mercy" (with Ross Wilson)
14. "I Gotcha"
15. "Little Darling"
16. "River Deep Mountain High"
17. "When Something Is Wrong with My Baby" (with John Farnham)
18. "Sweet Soul Music" (with Ross Wilson and Diesel)
19. "In the Midnight Hour" (with Diesel and John Farnham)

== Personnel ==
- Jimmy Barnes – vocals
- Tony Brock – drums, percussion
- Diesel – guitar, vocals on track 10
- Jeff Neill – guitar
- Rick Will – guitar
- Michael Hegerty – bass guitar
- Jimmy Haslip – bass
- Mal Logan – keyboards
- Phil Shenale – keyboards
- John Farnham – vocals on track 3
- Jimmy Barnes, Diesel, Marcy Levy, Wendy Fraser, Jessica Williams, Jeff Neill – backing vocals
- John Courtney – trombone
- Kevin Dubber – trumpet
- Mark Dennison – baritone saxophone
- Marty Hill – tenor saxophone
- Rick O'Neil – mastering engineer

== Charts and certifications ==
=== Weekly charts ===
Weekly chart performance for Soul Deep
Chart (1991–1992)	Peak position
Australian Albums (ARIA)	1
New Zealand Albums (RMNZ)	3

Weekly chart performance for Soul Deep 30
Chart (2022)	Peak position
Australian Albums (ARIA)	1
New Zealand Albums (RMNZ)	32

=== Year-end charts ===
1991 year-end chart performance for Soul Deep
Chart (1991)	Position
Australian Albums (ARIA)	33

1992 year-end chart performance for Soul Deep
Chart (1992)	Position
Australian Albums (ARIA)	3
New Zealand Albums(RIANZ)	19

=== Certifications ===
Certifications for Soul Deep
Region	Certification	Certified units/sales
Australia (ARIA)	10× Platinum	700,000^{‡}
New Zealand (RMNZ)	3× Platinum	45,000^{‡}
^{‡} Sales+streaming figures based on certification alone.

== See also ==
- List of number-one albums in Australia during the 1990s
- List of number-one albums of 2022 (Australia)
