= Elly-May Barnes =

Australian musician and inclusion advocate

- Origin: Sydney, New South Wales, Australia
- Genres: Rock; cabaret
- Occupations: Singer, songwriter, disability advocate
- Years active: 1991–present
- Formerly of: The Tin Lids

Elly-May Barnes (born 1988 or 1989) is an Australian musician and inclusion advocate. Starting her career as a backup singer for her father, Cold Chisel frontman Jimmy Barnes, she started doing solo rock shows, and then cabaret. She is known for her first solo single, a cover of the Radiohead song "Creep", in 2023, but came to national prominence in November 2024 with the airing of the documentary series Headliners. In this series, Barnes and other musicians formed bands comprising people with disabilities and mentored them over seven weeks, ending with a live performance at the Mundi Mundi Bash. Her debut album, No Good, was released on 12 April 2024.

== Early life and education ==
Elly-May Barnes was born in 1989 or 1990, the youngest of four children of rock musician Jimmy Barnes and his wife Jane. Her elder full siblings are Mahalia, Eliza-Jane, and Jackie. Elly-May was born 14 weeks prematurely, and doctors told her parents that there was only a 50% chance of survival. At the age of three, she was diagnosed with cerebral palsy. She had her first surgery at the age of six, and more followed. Barnes is of Scottish-Jewish descent through her father, and Thai descent through her mother.

Barnes looked up to her sisters, and remembers listening to her father sing and wanting to be a singer herself. She was a fan of Silverchair, Dolly Parton, Whitney Houston, and Elvis Presley, and liked drag queens. From the age of two, she was a member of the band formed by the four siblings, called The Tin Lids. Their Christmas 1991 album, Hey Rudolph!, was a platinum-selling album, giving Barnes her first hit single at the age of two.

The family lived in Bowral, New South Wales; the Sydney suburb of Double Bay; and Aix-en-Provence in France. In Year 11 she attended Kambala School in Sydney, and dated Elroy Finn, son of Crowded House frontman Neil Finn, before deciding to apply to study in the UK. She was accepted into Stowe School, in Buckinghamshire, and spent her final years of school there. Finn and a schoolfriend of Barnes flew over at the same time and also went to schools in the UK. Barnes loved the school, excelled in her subjects: advanced English, early modern history, and classical civilisations. However she came home before completing her final year, as she found the size of the school meant that her pain was exacerbated by all of the movement, and around that time her father had to have cardiac surgery.

== Career ==
Barnes started off singing in rock 'n' roll style, and did back-up vocals for her father. She did a few solo shows with free admission, because she "didn't tell anyone about because [she] didn't like people to come", before a breakthrough cabaret show in Darlinghurst in 2018 which came about by chance. She was accompanied on organ by Clayton Doley, and sang Patsy Cline songs. Her career took off after this. She performed a cabaret show called Glittery and Unhinged, in which she performed songs by Dolly Parton, Dusty Springfield, Dionne Warwick, Bob Dylan, and David Bowie. In 2020 she performed a cabaret version of Bowie's 1972 song "Moonage Daydream", accompanied by Doley. She enjoys dressing up, loves sparkly clothes, and uses a "light-up cane" on stage.

She released her first solo single, a cover of the Radiohead song "Creep", on 20 November 2023. She says that the song is "just a really beautiful song to relate to if you're feeling like you're in a world that's just not made for you". It was produced, mixed, and mastered by her "dear friend", Kevin Shirley, brother Jackie played drums, with Lachy Doley on keyboards, Kara Jayne on bass, and Jack Moffitt on guitar. The song was recorded at her father's studio, Freight Train Studios, and the music video was made by Robert Hambling.

=== No Good (2024) ===
Her debut album, released through ABC Music on 12 April 2024, is No Good. The tracks are largely original songs, co-written by her Uncle Mark Lizotte (better known as Diesel), Neil Finn, Cold Chisel pianist Don Walker, singer/songwriter Shane Nicholson, and others. The last track is a tribute to Bob Dylan. Other musicians who contributed to the album are Davey Lane (who wrote four of the songs), Kevin Shirley, Charley Drayton, Jack Moffitt, Clayton Doley, and Jackie Barnes. Diesel and Walker co-produced the album. The title track, "No Good", and "Baby Don't Slow Me Down" which were co-written by Barnes and Lane.

=== Other musical collaborations ===
Barnes performed live with indie rock band The Preatures on tour, supported Harry Styles, sang in Neil Finn's choir in a series of live shows showcasing songs from his album, Out of Silence. She recorded a song with Kirin J. Callinan, Clayton Doley, and Liam Finn for the 2022 New Zealand comedy film, Nude Tuesday. Davey Lane has appeared with her on stage at several of her cabaret shows.

== Advocacy ==
Barnes advocates strongly for inclusion for people with disabilities, "to show other people that there isn't this one mould of what a disabled person looks like. Or what any person looks like or can be".

Based on her experience, especially flying around on tour with her father, and performing on stage herself, she realised that "the whole world isn't built for everybody to get around". In 2023 she spoke about the need for venues to improve accessibility at a music conference for women. While she had not earlier spoken much about her own disability, started to realise that "it's important to talk about it because… I think people need to see themselves. I don't want people to think they should disappear", citing the case of Ann-Marie Smith in Adelaide, who died of neglect in a chair in her home. Barnes is a friend of younger disability advocate Hannah Diviney, who also has cerebral palsy. Diviney is known for calling out Lizzo and Beyoncé for using the word "spaz" in their songs, leading to both of them altering their lyrics. Both Barnes and Diviney do fundraising gigs for The Children's Hospital at Westmead, where both received treatment as children.

== Media work ==
=== Headliners ===
In November 2024, the five-part series Headliners premiered on ABC TV. The series features a project to advocate on behalf of musicians with disabilities, led by Barnes and narrated by Adam Hills. The project entailed bringing musicians with disabilities together to form two bands which, after coaching by experienced musicians and performers, would appear on stage at the Mundi Mundi Bash in western New South Wales, around 40 km (25 mi) from Broken Hill. Barnes described the project, which combines her love of music as her passion for advocacy, as a "group effort" in coming to fruition.

Tim Rogers mentored the group who become indie rock band Together With Strangers, while Ella Hooper took on the other one, forming the classic rock band Sync or Swim. Delta Goodrem, Silverchair drummer Ben Gillies, and Jimmy Barnes also each have a single session with the bands. The bands have just seven weeks to prepare for their live performances at the festival, and the series shows their struggles to play together as a band, but without over-dramatising, as do some reality shows on television.

The songs chosen for each band were as follows:

- Sync or Swim:
  - "Hit Me with Your Best Shot" (Pat Benatar)
  - "Don't Dream It's Over" (Crowded House)
- Together With Strangers:
  - "The Real Thing" (Johnny Young)
  - "Boys in Town" (Divinyls)

Both bands proved to be hits in front of the audience, with Rogers afterwards commenting "I've never felt pride like that, it was really overwhelming and very emotional because what these people have had to go through is very humbling". The series was widely covered in the press and received many positive reviews. It is distributed internationally by Banijay.

Headliners was co-produced by ABC Television and Endemol Shine Australia, including the same team who created Old People's Home for 4 Year Olds. They produced the show in association with Screen Australia, with additional support from Screen NSW.

=== Rock the Rat ===
An upcoming music documentary series, Rock the Rat, highlights the importance of inclusion for musicians living with disabilities. In July 2024 the series' first live concert, filmed to create the first episode in the series, featured Barnes, Tim Rogers, and Ella Hooper.

== Personal life ==
Barnes is very close to her parents, Jimmy and Jane, and all of her three siblings, Mahalia, Eliza-Jane (EJ), and Jackie, are also involved in the music industry.

Her uncle is Mark Lizotte, better known as the musician Diesel.

She suffers from chronic pain caused by her cerebral palsy, and has had many medical procedures since infancy. She undergoes regular physiotherapy, has to regularly have casts put on her legs to stretch them, and has Botox injections to stop spasms in her legs. In around 2021 she had major surgery to lengthen her calves and Achilles tendons.

She fell pregnant at the age of 24, and had her son Dylan, whom she credits with leading her to look after herself better and value herself more.
