= Working Class Boy (memoir) =

Jimmy Barnes memoir

- Author: Jimmy Barnes
- Language: English
- Genre: memoir
- Published: 2016 (HarperCollins)
- Publication place: Australia
- Media type: Print (hardback)
- Pages: 384
- ISBN: 9781460752135
- OCLC: 951507638

Working Class Boy is a 2016 memoir by Jimmy Barnes. It is about Barnes' childhood in Glasgow and Adelaide. Barnes details his childhood in Glasgow up until him joining Cold Chisel.

Working Class Boy has sold more than 250,000 copies and was named the Biography of the Year at 2017 ABIA Awards.

== Reception ==
Rolling Stone magazine in a review of Working Class Boy wrote "Barnes writes with verve and style to present a fascinating story of flawed and compelling personalities, not least his own. The result is unexpectedly compelling."

It debuted at number 1 on the Australian bestsellers list, and remained in the top 10 for a number of weeks.
