= Mahalia Barnes =

Australian singer, songwriter + artist manager

- Photo by Pierre Baroni

Background information
- Born: Mahalia Violet Barnes; 12 July 1982 (age 44)
- Origin: Sydney, New South Wales, Australia
- Genres: Rock; soul; funk
- Occupations: Singer, songwriter, backing singer, artist manager
- Years active: 1991–present
- Labels: Liberation, Provogue, Apple Street Music
- Formerly of: The Tin Lids
- Spouse: Benjamin Rodgers (married 2010 - present)
- Website: https://www.applestreetmusic.com/

Mahalia Violet Barnes (born 12 July 1982) is an Australian singer-songwriter, the daughter of Scottish-Australian rock singer Jimmy Barnes and Jane Mahoney. She began performing as part of children's pop group The Tin Lids with siblings, Eliza-Jane "E.J.", Elly-May, and Jackie. She later formed her own band, Mahalia Barnes + the Soul Mates, and has recorded several albums + EPs with them. She has collaborated with Joe Bonamassa, both in studio and in live performance, as well as other musical artists, including work as a backing vocalist.

== Early life and education ==
Mahalia Violet Barnes was born on 12 July 1982 in Sydney. She is the daughter of Jimmy Barnes, an Australian rock singer, and Jane (née Mahoney), the Thai-born stepdaughter of an Australian diplomat. The pair married in Sydney on 22 May 1981. Barnes was named after United States gospel singer, Mahalia Jackson. Her father has Scottish ancestry.

When she was eight, Barnes joined younger siblings Eliza-Jane "E.J." and Jackie for the recording sessions of their father's Two Fires album. Their voices are among the children's choir that features on the track "When Your Love is Gone". From the age of nine, she formed part of the children's singing group The Tin Lids with siblings"E.J.", Jackie, and Elly-May Barnes. Their Christmas 1991 album, Hey Rudolph!, was a platinum-selling album.

== Career ==
=== Solo and with her band ===
As of 2024 she has recorded four albums with her band Mahalia Barnes and the Soul Mates: Mahalia Barnes + the Soul Mates Volume 1 (2008); Mahalia Barnes + the Soul Mates Volume 2 (2012); Ooh Yeah! – The Betty Davis Songbook (2015); and Hard Expectations (2018).

Barnes auditioned for the first season of the Australian version of The Voice with the song "Proud Mary", the episode of which was broadcast on 22 April 2012 on the Nine Network. All coaches pressed their buttons (the first was Keith Urban), then realised that she was in fact Jimmy Barnes's daughter. Mahalia chose to join Joel Madden's team. Mahalia was eliminated in the battle ring when she was pitted against Prinnie Stevens, who is very close to Mahalia.

Prinnie + Mahalia went on to release an album called "Come Together" and toured the country extensively.

=== With Joe Bonamassa ===
Ooh Yeah! – The Betty Davis Songbook, released in February 2015, is a tribute to American funk/soul singer Betty Davis, and was Barnes' first collaboration with Joe Bonamassa. The album was produced by Kevin Shirley. The collaboration came about after Barnes had played some Davis tracks to producer Shirley, who suggested recording the album and inviting Bonamassa (whose music he had previously produced) to be part of the process. Barnes continued to collaborate with Bonamassa, including as a back-up singer on his studio album Blues of Desperation.

=== Other work and collaborations ===
Barnes has often worked with her father Jimmy, and recorded a duet with him, "Gonna Take Some Time", released as the second single from his album Double Happiness) in 2005.

She has also sung with her friend R&B singer Jade MacRae, who later worked as a backup singer for her father. With MacRae and Kara Grainger, she sang as a guest vocalist on the debut album of the Sydney band The Hands (whose members include session musicians Clayton and Lachlan Doley), Live And Breathe (2004).

Barnes became Reece Mastin's manager in early 2015, when he was signed to Social Family Records.

In 2021, Barnes competed in the third season of the Australian version of the Masked Singer as the "Pavlova". She finished eighth after being eliminated in the fifth episode.

Mahalia started Apple Street Music - a management, production, bookings and record company with her husband Benjamin Rodgers. Their daughter Ruby Rodgers is managed by Apple Street Music. She also started Working Class Management - the company responsible for the management and live bookings of Jimmy Barnes.

== Discography ==
=== Albums ===
| Title | Details |
|---|---|
| Volume 1 (by Mahalia Barnes The Soul Mates) | Released: 2008; Label: Liberation Music (LMCD0002); Format: CD, digital download |
| Come Together (with Prinnie) | Released: 2012; Label: Mercury Records Australia (3716262); Format: CD, digital download |
| Ooh Yeah! – The Betty Davis Songbook (Mahalia Barnes and The Soul Mates featuring Joe Bonamassa) | Released: 2015; Label: Provogue (PRD 7455 2); Format: 2xCD, 2xLP, digital download |
| Hard Expectations (by Mahalia Barnes The Soul Mates) | Released: 2018; Label: The Soul Mates (soulmate3); Format: CD, digital download, streaming |

=== Extended plays ===
| Title | Details |
|---|---|
| Mahalia Barnes Live At The Basement | Released: 2006; Label: Mahalia Barnes/ Liberation Music (MB001); Format: CD, digital download |
| Mahalia Barnes + The Soul Mates (by Mahalia Barnes The Soul Mates) | Released: 2007; Label: Liberation Music (LIBEP9264.2); Format: CD, digital download |
| Mahalia Barnes + The Soul Mates Volume 2 (by Mahalia Barnes The Soul Mates) | Released: Label: The Soul Mates (soulmate3); Format: CD, digital download |

=== Singles ===
| Title | Year | Chart peak positions | Album |
| Title | Year | AUS | Album |
|---|---|---|---|
| "Gonna Take Some Time" (with Jimmy Barnes) | 2005 | 31 | Double Happiness |
| "I'm Just Not Ready for Love" (as Mahalia Barnes The Soul Mates) | 2008 | — | Volume 1 |
| "Steppin in Her I. Miller Shoes" (as Mahalia Barnes The Soul Mates featuring Joe Bonamassa) | 2015 | — | Ooh Yeah! – The Betty Davis Songbook |
| "I'm on fire" | 2018 | – | single |
