= For the Working Class Man =

- Australian version

Studio album by Jimmy Barnes
- Released: December 4, 1985
- Genre: Hard rock
- Length: 44:00
- Label: Mushroom
- Producers: Mark Opitz, Jonathan Cain, Gary Gersh, Chas Sanford

Jimmy Barnes chronology
Bodyswerve (1984)	For the Working Class Man (1985)	Freight Train Heart (1987)

Singles from For the Working Class Man
- 1. "I'd Die to Be with You Tonight" Released: 26 August 1985; 2. "Working Class Man" Released: November 1985; 3. "Ride the Night Away" Released: February 1986

Jimmy Barnes
- American version

Professional ratings
Review scores
Source	Rating
Allmusic	2/5 stars
Kerrang!	4/5 stars

For the Working Class Man is the second studio album by former Cold Chisel frontman Jimmy Barnes, released in December 1985. The album consists of five original tracks and seven remixed tracks that had previously been released on Barnes' 1984 debut album Bodyswerve.

== Details ==
For the Working Class Man (re-titled Jimmy Barnes for the international market—after the original title of A Week Away from Paradise was scrapped—with a slightly altered track listing and different cover artwork) was specifically geared toward securing Barnes a break into the American music market by Geffen. The new material found on the album was recorded in New York and Los Angeles with a variety of high-profile American producers, session musicians, and outside songwriters. Journey's Jonathan Cain contributed, produced and performed on two tracks, "Working Class Man" (which has since become Barnes' signature song as a solo artist after being featured in the Ron Howard film Gung Ho) and "American Heartbeat", Steven Van Zandt of Bruce Springsteen's E Street Band co-wrote "Ride the Night Away", Chas Sandford penned "I'd Die to Be with You Tonight" and "Without Your Love" was co-written with former Rainbow keyboardist Tony Carey.

In 2010 the album was remastered and reissued under the title "For the Working Class Man 25" under license to Liberation Music for Australia and New Zealand. This reissue has the same songs in the same order as the original release, however, four of the tracks ("I'd Die to Be with You Tonight", "Ride the Night Away", "Working Class Man" and "No Second Prize") were extensively reworked in 2009 by David Nicholas (for DNA Productions) resulting in significantly different track lengths. The album cover of the reissue is derived from the original Australian version; the most significant differences being the addition of an outer black square framing border, a bold black number "25" in the lower left hand corner while the main photograph has an (apparently) deeper red saturation.

In October 2010, For the Working Class Man, was listed in the book, 100 Best Australian Albums.

As of 2012, For the Working Class Man has sold more than 500,000 copies (7 x Platinum) in Barnes' native Australia.

In October 2017, a two disc "Commemorative Edition" of the album was released; the first disc contains the original album remastered by Don Bartley, the second disc (a DVD) contains a live performance from 1984. This release coincided with the release of Barnes' memoir 'Working Class Man', as well as his spoken word tour of the same name, starting in 2018.

== Track listing ==
=== For the Working Class Man ===
Side one
No.	Title	Writer(s)	Length
1.	"I'd Die to Be with You Tonight"	Chas Sandford	4:02
2.	"Ride the Night Away"	Steven Van Zandt, Steve Jordan	4:26
3.	"American Heartbeat"	Jonathan Cain	4:10

Side two
No.	Title	Writer(s)	Length
1.	"Working Class Man"	Cain	3:33
2.	"Without Your Love"	Jimmy Barnes, Tony Carey	4:28

Side three
No.	Title	Writer(s)	Length
1.	"No Second Prize"	Barnes	3:42
2.	"Vision"	Barnes	3:08
3.	"Promise Me You'll Call"	Barnes	3:33
4.	"Boys Cry Out for War"	Barnes	3:58

Side four
No.	Title	Writer(s)	Length
1.	"Daylight"	Barnes	3:21
2.	"Thickskinned"	Barnes, Ray Arnott	3:30
3.	"Paradise"	Barnes	2:45

=== Jimmy Barnes ===
Side one
No.	Title	Writer(s)	Length
1.	"No Second Prize"	Barnes	3:42
2.	"I'd Die to Be with You Tonight"	Sandford	4:02
3.	"Working Class Man"	Cain	3:33
4.	"Promise Me You'll Call"	Barnes	3:33
5.	"Boys Cry Out for War"	Barnes	3:58

Side two
No.	Title	Writer(s)	Length
1.	"Paradise"	Barnes	2:45
2.	"Without Your Love"	Barnes, Carey	4:28
3.	"American Heartbeat"	Cain	4:10
4.	"Thickskinned"	Barnes, Arnott	3:30
5.	"Ride the Night Away"	Van Zandt, Jordan	4:26
6.	"Daylight"	Barnes	3:21

== Charts ==
=== Weekly charts ===
Chart (1985–87)	Peak position
Australian Albums (Kent Music Report)	1
New Zealand Albums (RMNZ)	2
US Billboard 200	109
Chart (2017)	Peak position
Australian Albums (ARIA)	23

=== Year-end charts ===
Chart (1986)	Position
Australian Albums (Kent Music Report)	3
New Zealand Albums (RMNZ)	4

Year-end chart performance for For the Working Class Man (40th Anniversary)
Chart (2025)	Position
Australian Artist Albums (ARIA)	16

== Certifications ==
Region	Certification	Certified units/sales
Australia (ARIA)	7× Platinum	490,000^{^}
New Zealand (RMNZ)	Platinum	15,000^{^}
^{^} Shipments figures based on certification alone.

== Personnel ==
- Jimmy Barnes - lead vocals
- Tommy Thayer, Chas Sandford, Mal Eastick, Waddy Wachtel, Dave Amato, Charlie Sexton, Billy Burnette, Chris Stockley, Johnny Lee - guitar
- Randy Jackson, Kenny Gradney, Bruce Howe - bass
- Tony Braunagel, Mick Fleetwood, Tony Brock, Ray Arnott - drums
- Jonathan Cain, William Smith, Bill Payne - keyboards
- Arno Lewis - percussion
- Kim Carnes, Maxine Willard, Julia Tillman, Dave Amato, Jonathan Cain, Renée Geyer, Venetta Fields, Shauna Jenson - backing vocals
- Chris Stockley - mandolin
- Barry Gray & Viv Riley - bagpipes

== See also ==
- List of number-one albums in Australia during the 1980s
