= Working Class Man =

Single by Jimmy Barnes

from the album For the Working Class Man
- B-side: "Boys Cry Out For War"
- Released: November 1985 (Australia); 1986 (US)
- Recorded: 1985
- Genre: Hard rock
- Length: 3:50
- Label: Mushroom Records, Geffen Records
- Songwriter: Jonathan Cain
- Producer: Jonathan Cain

Jimmy Barnes singles chronology
"I'd Die to Be with You Tonight" (1985)	"Working Class Man" (1985)	"Ride the Night Away" (1986)

"Working Class Man" is a song performed and made famous by Australian singer Jimmy Barnes. It was written by Journey keyboardist Jonathan Cain. "Working Class Man" is generally considered Barnes' signature song as a solo artist.

At the 1985 Countdown Music Awards, the song won Best Male Performance in a Video.

In January 2018, as part of Triple M's "Ozzest 100", the "most Australian" songs of all time, "Working Class Man" was ranked number 3. In July of 2025, the song placed 56 on the Triple J Hottest 100 of Australian Songs, voted on by the public.

== Details ==
The song was released in November 1985 as the second single from the 1985 album For the Working Class Man. The single spent 14 weeks in the Australian charts, entering at No. 21 and peaking at No. 5. It also spent seven weeks on the New Zealand charts, peaking at No. 34.

It was later played over the credits of the 1986 Ron Howard film Gung Ho, where in some countries, including Australia, the film was released as Working Class Man. Barnes also performed "Working Class Man" at the closing ceremony of the 2000 Sydney Olympic Games.

Barnes has said of the song, "I went to America just after Bodyswerve and met Jonathan Cain, who was in The Babys and Journey. It means a lot to me. Most people thought it was written about me, but it was actually written about my audience-- staunch, honest people, who work and who care." Barnes said that, due to the "great band" he had, the recording was done in about 5 takes. "It was fun to sing, so I was really pleased. I didn't realise how much of an impact it would have as an image centre for the next five years."

The music video was filmed in Australia at the Port Kembla Steelworks in Wollongong, New South Wales, and in cane fields near Cairns in Queensland. The Director/DOP of the clip was Chris Frazer, and the Producer/2nd unit Camera was Mark Lovick.

== "Working Class Anthem" ==
At the 2003 Melbourne Comedy Festival, comedian Adam Hills performed a popular version of Australia's national anthem "Advance Australia Fair" to the tune of "Working Class Man" titled the "Working Class Anthem". He released it as a single the following year.

Hills performed the song for Barnes when he appeared as a guest on the television program Spicks and Specks.

== Track listing ==
7" Single (K 9883)

- Side A "Working Class Man"
- Side B "No Second Prize" (Remix)

== Charts ==
Chart (1985/86)	Peak Position
Australia (Kent Music Report)	5
United States (Billboard)	74

== Certifications ==
Certifications for "Working Class Man"
Region	Certification	Certified units/sales
New Zealand (RMNZ)	3× Platinum	90,000^{‡}
^{‡} Sales+streaming figures based on certification alone.

== Cover versions ==
In 1993, Australian John Schumann covered the song on his album True Believers. In 2004, Australian singer-songwriter Shannon Noll recorded a cover of "Working Class Man". It was released as a B-side track for his second single Drive. Australian singer songwriter Martin Way covered the song acoustically in 2012 and fellow Australian Adam Brand and the Outlaws covered the song on the 2016 album Adam Brand and the Outlaws.

Lacy J. Dalton released a version in 1986 that reached number 16 in the US Country charts. Barnes said of this version, "She was managed by a guy who used to manage Split Enz, a Kiwi guy, who took the song to her. She did a great version, but it's got a real twang."
