= Percy Allan =

Australian civil engineer (1861–1930)

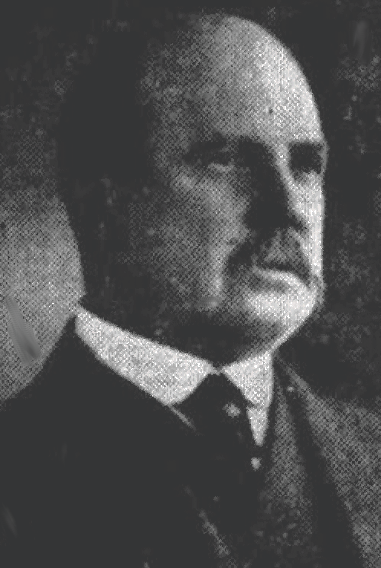
- Born: 12 July 1861; Elizabeth Street, Sydney, Colony of New South Wales
- Died: 7 May 1930 (aged 68); Darlinghurst, New South Wales, Australia
- Occupation: Civil engineer
- Known for: Bridge design; Allan Truss bridge

Percy Allan (12 July 1861 – 7 May 1930) was an Australian civil engineer who designed many public works in New South Wales, including the design of 583 bridges.

== Early life ==
Allan was the son of Maxwell Rennie Allan, principal Under-Secretary of State for New South Wales, and was born in Elizabeth Street, Sydney on 12 July 1861. He was educated at Calder House, Redfern, and joined the government Works Department in 1878 as a cadet.

== Career ==
Between 1893 and 1896, he designed 349 bridges and punts in New South Wales, and between 1896 and 1899 he designed a further 126 bridges including the Pyrmont Bridge and the Glebe Island Bridge.

In 1900, he was appointed Principal Assistant Engineer for Rivers, Water Supply and Drainage, and supervised the completion of the Sydney low level sewerage system, which was a pumping system to replace harbour sewage outfalls. Following this he was appointed to the Hunter District Water Supply and Sewerage Board. He returned to the Public Works Department in 1912, and had overall design responsibility for the steel Pratt truss–type Tom Uglys Bridge over the Georges River. He is also credited with designing his own type of Truss Bridge, the Allan Truss.

He was awarded a Telford Premium by the Institution of Civil Engineers for a paper on port improvements in Newcastle, including excavation of the channel and extension of the breakwater.

== Retirement and death ==
Allan retired from the public service in March 1926; and died suddenly at his home in Darlinghurst on 7 May 1930. He was survived by his wife and two sons.

== See also ==
- List of bridges designed by Percy Allan
