= I'd Die to Be with You Tonight =

Single by Jimmy Barnes

from the album For the Working Class Man
- B-side: "Vision"
- Released: 26 August 1985
- Studio: Rhinoceros
- Length: 3:54
- Label: Mushroom
- Songwriter: Chas Sandford
- Producers: Chas Sandford; Gary Gersh

Jimmy Barnes singles chronology
"Daylight" (1985)	"I'd Die to Be with You Tonight" (1985)	"Working Class Man" (1985)

"I'd Die to Be with You Tonight" is a song by Australian rock musician, Jimmy Barnes. Released in August 1985 as the lead single from his second studio album, For the Working Class Man. The song peaked at number seven on the Australian Kent Music Report, becoming Barnes' first solo top ten single. Kim Carnes participates in the song on the harmony vocals.

The song was written by Chas Sandford. In his autobiography, Barnes claimed that Sandford was initially unwilling to part with the song, saying that he had already declined to give it to Don Henley because he was saving it for a solo album.

The music video was filmed on the Pyrmont Bridge in 1985, before the Darling Harbour redevelopments.

== Track listing ==
7" Single (K-9819)

- Side A "I'd Die to Be with You Tonight" - 3:54
- Side B "Vision" - 3:08

12" /Maxi (X 14248)

- Side A "I'd Die to Be with You Tonight" (Extended)
- Side B1 "Resurrection Shuffle"
- Side B2 "Vision" - 3:08

== Charts ==
=== Weekly charts ===
Chart (1985)	Peak position
Australia (Kent Music Report)	7
New Zealand (Recorded Music NZ)	16

=== Year-end charts ===
Chart (1985)	Position
Australia (Kent Music Report)	26

== Certifications ==
Certifications for "I'd Die to Be with You Tonight"
Region	Certification	Certified units/sales
New Zealand (RMNZ)	Gold	15,000^{‡}
^{‡} Sales+streaming figures based on certification alone.
