= Glebe Island Bridge =

Swing Allan truss road bridge in Sydney, New South Wales, Australia

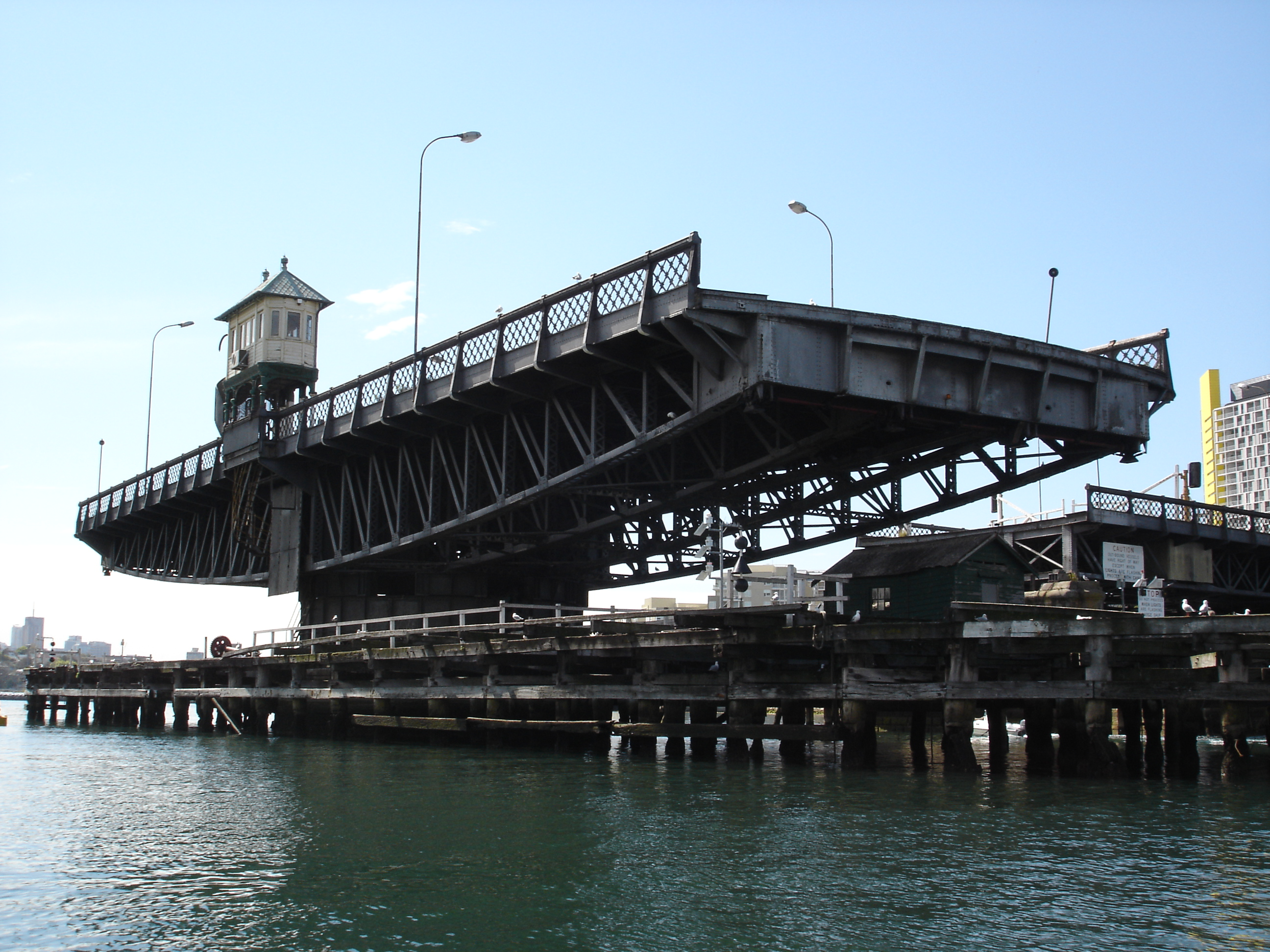
- The bridge in a permanently open position, 2006
- Coordinates: 33°52′06″S 151°11′09″E
- Carries: Bank Street
- Crosses: Johnstons Bay
- Locale: Rozelle – Pyrmont, Sydney, New South Wales, Australia
- Maintained by: Transport for NSW
- Preceded by: Blackbutts Bridge
- Followed by: Anzac Bridge

Characteristics
- Design: Swing Allan truss
- Material: Steel
- Trough construction: Timber
- Total length: 108 metres (353 ft 6 in)
- Width: 15 metres (50 ft)
- Height: 6 metres (20 ft)
- Longest span: 58 metres (191 ft)
- No. of spans: 3

History
- Engineering design by: Percy Allan; Ernest de Burgh; H. H. Dare; J. J. Bradfield; J. W. Roberts
- Constructed by: H. McKenzie and Sons
- Construction start: 1899
- Construction end: 1903
- Opened: 1 July 1903
- Closed: 2 December 1995
- Replaces: Blackbutts Bridge (1862–1903)

New South Wales Heritage Register
- Official name: Glebe Island Bridge; RMS Bridge No. 61
- Type: State heritage (built)
- Designated: 29 November 2013
- Reference no.: 1914
- Type: Road Bridge
- Category: Transport – Land
- Builders: Bridges Branch of NSW Public Works Department

Register of the National Estate
- Official name: Glebe Island Bridge, Bank St, Pyrmont, NSW, Australia
- Type: Historic
- Designated: 19 April 1989
- Reference no.: 15949

Location
- Interactive map of Glebe Island Bridge

The Glebe Island Bridge is a heritage-listed disused swing Allan truss road bridge that carried Victoria Road (as Bank Street) across Johnstons Bay, located in the inner city Sydney suburb of Pyrmont, New South Wales, Australia.

The bridge, which connected Rozelle to Pyrmont by road, is one of the last remaining swing bridges of its type in Australia and in the world. It was designed by Percy Allan, and built from 1899 to 1903 by the Bridges Branch of NSW Public Works Department.

Replaced in 1995 by the Anzac Bridge, the swing span of the Glebe Island Bridge has been permanently open since, and has deteriorated over the following decades, while a number of proposals for adaptive reuse of the bridge for pedestrians have been made but not come to fruition. The bridge was listed on the New South Wales State Heritage Register on 29 November 2013, and had been listed on the (now defunct) Register of the National Estate on 19 April 1989.

== History ==
Sydney was declared a city in 1842 and was concentrated in the area currently occupied by the modern CBD. In the mid-1800s, it was a mix of commerce, retail, residences, manufacturing works and factories, with the Botanic Gardens and Domain to the east, port activities to the west and north and road outlets at its southern border leading to the inner western suburbs via the Parramatta Road, which was also the beginning of the Great Western Highway. By mid-century, it had become clear that a shorter route out of the city was available, across Johnstons Bay to the Glebe Island and on to Annandale.

=== First bridge ===
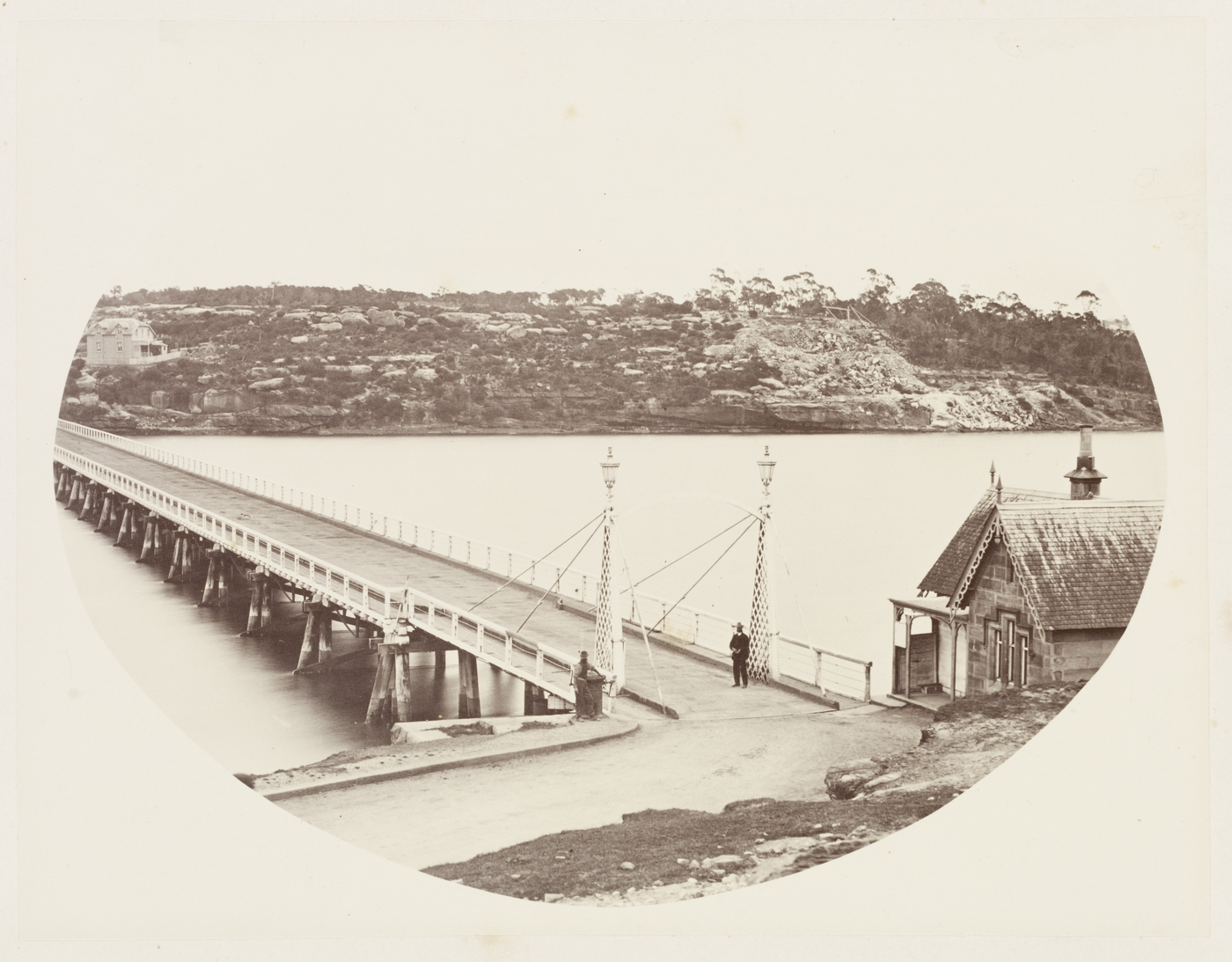
The first Glebe Island Bridge in 1872

Blackbutts Bridge
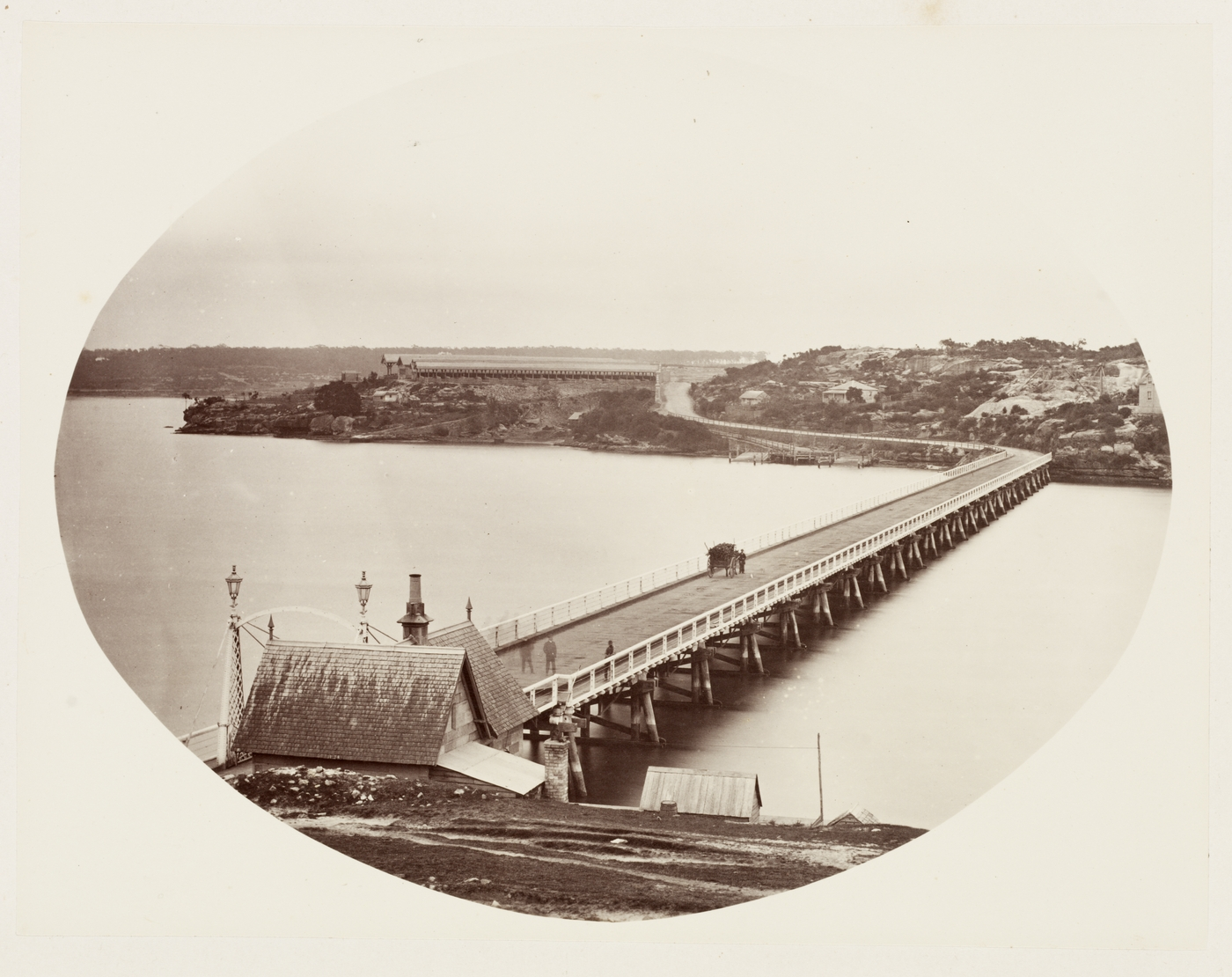
- Coordinates: 33°52′06″S 151°11′09″E
- Crosses: Johnstons Bay

Characteristics
- Material: Tasmanian blackbutt timber
- Total length: 319 metres (1,045 ft 5 in)
- Width: 9 metres (28 ft)
- Longest span: 12 metres (38 ft)
- No. of spans: 27

History
- Opened: 1862
- Closed: 1903
- Replaced by: Glebe Island Bridge (2nd bridge)

Location
- Interactive map of Blackbutts Bridge

The first Glebe Island Bridge was a private toll-bridge completed in 1862 and was a timber beam viaduct with a small, one arm, hand-cranked swing-span tucked into the Pyrmont shore. Constructed out of Tasmanian blackbutt (a common name at the time for a variety of Eucalyptus species), it was often referred to as Blackbutt Bridge. The first bridge was part of a series of bridges including the first Pyrmont Bridge and the bridge across Black Wattle Swamp (since filled in and now Wentworth Park, which shortened the travel distance to the inner west suburbs making it easier for produce to be conveyed to the city. A previously un-used part of Johnstons Bay was promoted as the site for a larger abattoir than the others previously used around the closer areas of high water. The new abattoir, to be opened in January 1860, was provided a punt system to cross the short distance to Pyrmont until the opening of the bridge two years later. Work commenced on the first Glebe Island bridge in 1860; and the first bridge opened for traffic in 1861.

After 30 years, this bridge was in need of extensive repairs and the Colonial Government purchased the structure and the Public Works Department (PWD) began planning a replacement bridge.

=== Second and current bridge ===
The construction of the second bridge related also to a project commenced in the 1880s for the Five Bridges Route, to facilitate traffic flow from the city to the northern and western suburbs of the expanding city. Bridges were to be built or replaced at Pyrmont Bay, Glebe Island, Iron Cove, Gladesville and Fig Tree (until these bridges were built, the only access to the northern shore of the Harbour was by boat, punt or by road via Parramatta). For this project, the (old) Pyrmont Bridge and the (old) Glebe Island Bridge were purchased from their private owners and new bridges were built at Gladesville (1881), Iron Cove (1882) and Fig Tree (1885).

These completed, attention turned to replacement of the Pyrmont and Glebe Island Bridges. The Sydney Morning Herald reported in September 1890:

"The Departmental Board appointed by the Minister for Public Works nearly a year ago to consider the desirability of constructing new bridges to replace the present Pyrmont and Glebe Island bridges ... has now furnished the Minister with a lengthy report on the subject. The Board has decided in favour of the construction of a new bridge adjoining the present Pyrmont Bridge. The structure recommended is an iron or steel superstructure on cast-iron cylinders, with a roadway 12ft, in width, and two 12ft. footpaths. ...With regard to the Glebe Island Bridge, the Board recommended the construction of a bridge close to the present one, of a character similar to the proposed Pyrmont Bridge, at a cost of £140,000."

An international design competition for a new "Pyrmont Bridge" was called in 1891. The Department of Public Works submitted a non-conforming design based upon a much larger bridge than specified in the design brief.

Prizes were awarded but no designs were selected and the proposal was deferred, largely owing to the economic downturn of the early 1890s but also owing to different opinions regarding the best approach. The Chief Engineer for Harbour and Rivers, C. W. Darley, favoured the construction of a new bridge - the Chief Engineer for Roads and Bridges, Robert Hickson, favoured the reclamation of Darling Harbour as far north as Bathurst Street and no replacement for the Pyrmont Bridge at all.

In 1894 the proposal was referred to the Parliamentary Standing Committee for Public Works (the Public Works Committee) and, reporting in June, the Committee favoured no particular scheme but recommended that, when renewal of Pyrmont and Glebe Island bridges became advisable, they should be replaced by timber structures.

On 21 November 1894 the Public Works Committee (reformed in the interim under a new government) recommended that Pyrmont Bridge be replaced by a timber bridge with steel swing-span, to cost £82,500, and that Glebe Island Bridge did not require renewal. No funds were allocated, though and no action resulted. By 1897, however, the Committee had reconsidered its stance and recommended the replacement of the old Glebe Island Bridge with a stone causeway and a bridge with a steel swing-span, at a cost of £89,100. Parliament voted the funding for these works in 1898 and detailed design work commenced in the Public Works Drawing Offices.

Design of the bridges was led by Percy Allan, who had been appointed Engineer-in-Chief for bridge design in 1896. His assistant engineer was Ernest de Burgh and the junior engineers were H. H. Dare, John Bradfield and J. W. Roberts, all of whom went on to have distinguished careers in public works engineering. Bradfield had charge of the team responsible for the substructure, foundations, abutments and retaining walls for both bridges. Tenders for the construction of both bridges (separate contracts) were invited in March 1899.

For both sites, Allan designed an electrically-operated swing bridge, the earliest use of electrical power for this purpose in Australia. The bridges were considered very innovative at the time of their construction and attracted international attention. For the Glebe Island Bridge, the large pivot pier was founded on a nest of timber piles capped by concrete, whereas the Pyrmont pivot pier was founded on rock.

Construction commenced on the Glebe Island Bridge and Pyrmont Bridge at the same time but Glebe Island involved more extensive (and time-consuming) land resumptions, extensive waterfront reclamation and the construction of an elevated causeway across Glebe Island. Over 9,072 tonnes (10,000 short tons) of mud was dredged to establish the causeway and the fill was obtained by cutting down what was left of the hillock of Glebe Island, producing 5.3 hectares (13 acres) of flat land for railway yards and 853 metres (2,799 ft) of deepwater frontage for wharfage. In August 1899 a large load of ballast being placed for the causeway to the new bridge slipped sideways and crushed the piles of the old bridge, rendering it unfit for anything but pedestrian traffic for the following two weeks.

Construction of the trussed swing spans at each site was by simple cantilevering out from the steel pivot ring. Where timber trusses were used for the approaches of the Pyrmont Bridge, the Glebe Island Bridge used two steel deck trusses, then stone-faced embankments to reach each shore. The use of steel trusses for the approach spans had been part of Allan's original design for the Pyrmont Bridge but the Parliamentary Standing Committee on Public Works directed that this material be replaced with timber, presumably as a cost-cutting measure. When Glebe Island Bridge was built, Allan's original specification was reinstated (perhaps owing to the use of built-up embankments and shorter approach spans, providing a more economical outcome).

The contractor for construction was H. McKenzie and Sons and the bridge was opened on 1 July 1903 by Miss Lily See, daughter of Premier, John See. It was opened the year after the opening of the new Pyrmont Bridge over Darling Harbour, which has a similar design. The bridge was designed by Percy Allan of the New South Wales Public Works Department who also designed the Pyrmont Bridge. During normal operation the two 29.1-metre (95 ft) swing spans rotated about a central vertical axis.

=== Operation, replacement and decline ===
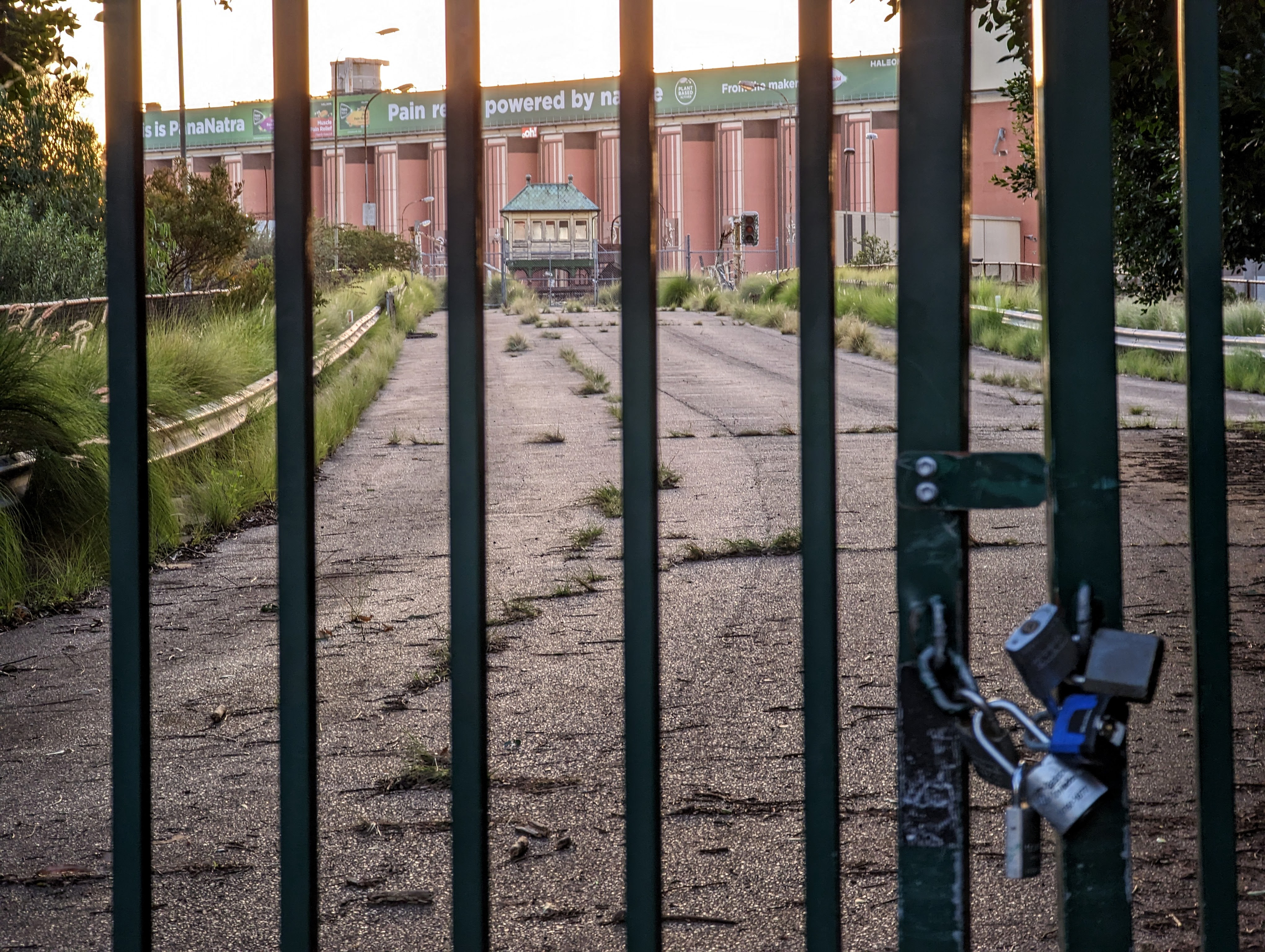
East approach to the Glebe Island Bridge from near Pyrmont's Waterfront Park, with Cement Australia and Sugar Australia silos in the background

The Glebe Island Bridge operated from 1903 to 1995 with little interruption and few major works, apart from maintenance, being undertaken. In 1933, the bridge underwent an underwater upgrade, with underpinning to replace decayed piles around the central pier. In 1961, the DC electricity supply from the Tramways system was shut down, as was the tramway system in Sydney. A new AC supply was obtained from the local reticulated network and a set of rectifiers was installed in a small kiosk erected on the north east side of the bridge. In the 1980s, the Control Cabin was burnt out and was subsequently rebuilt to the original design.

In 1995 the bridge was decommissioned being made redundant with opening of the adjacent high level 'new Glebe Island Bridge', which was renamed the Anzac Bridge in 1998. The replaced bridge remains in a permanently open position with no access to pedestrians or vehicular traffic. The bridge was operated and used for access by cyclists in the annual Spring Cycle in October until 2008.

On 18 April 1989 the bridge was listed on the (now defunct) Register of the National Estate.

A 2009 structural assessment found the bridge in "very poor condition" and in April 2013 a new report found that it had deteriorated further.

=== Reopening ===
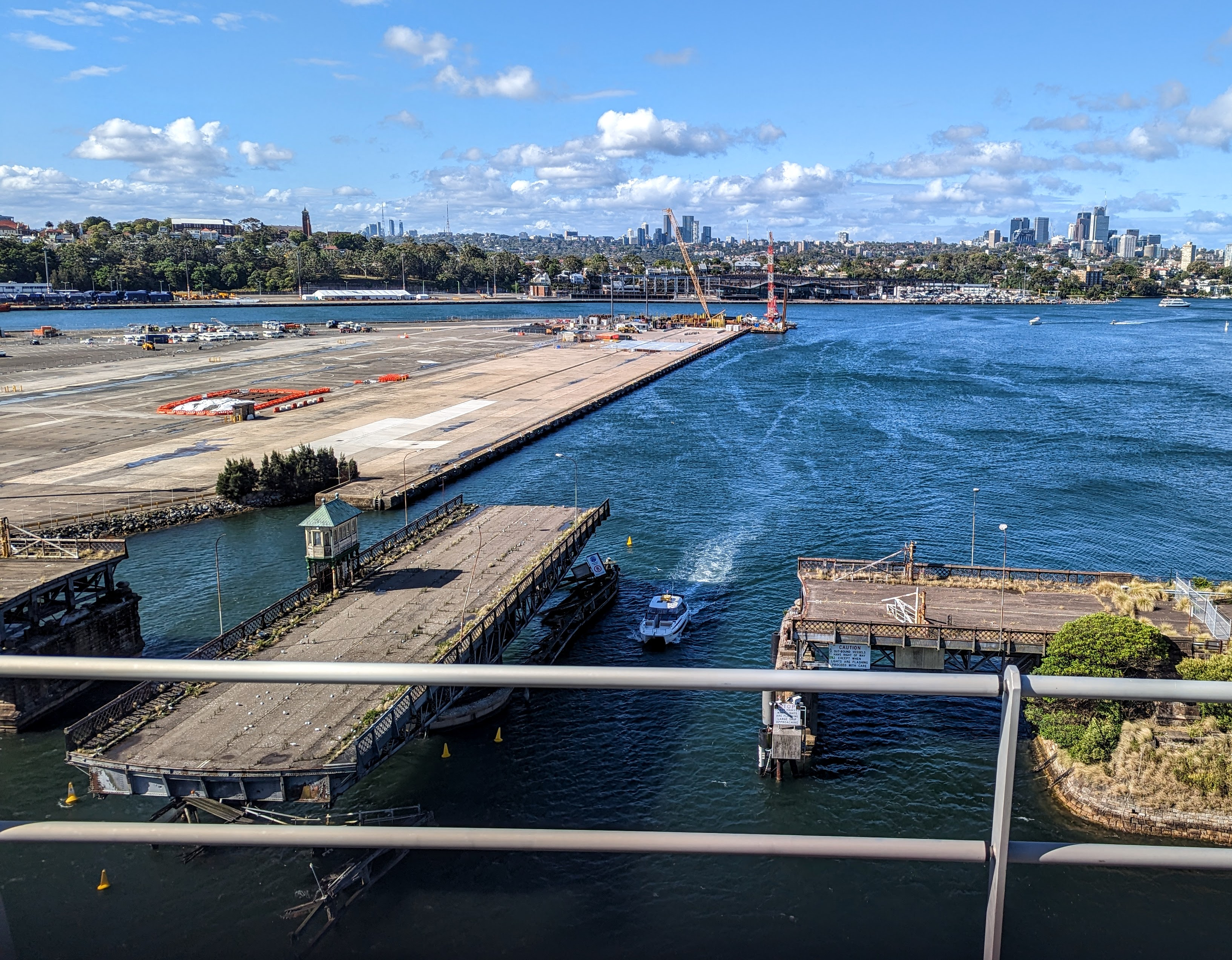
Glebe Island Bridge and Glebe Island as seen from the Anzac Bridge

Although superseded in operation as a main road bridge by the Anzac Bridge, the Glebe Island Bridge remains operable, with both approach roads open and available for future use. Many Australian heritage bridges such as the Pyrmont Bridge have been adapted for pedestrian and cycle use. Today Pyrmont Bridge serves as a strategic link to the CBD despite initial attempts to demolish the structure as part of the Darling Harbour redevelopment in the late 1980s. Similarly, its twin possesses equal value as a strategic transport link from Glebe Island to the city. The Glebe Island Bridge's role as one of the five bridges route to the north west will once again become critical with the urban renewal of the Bays Precinct, and there have been a number of proposals and calls to reopen the bridge for people walking and riding bicycles.

City of Sydney Council and community groups lobbied the state government to restore the structure and reopen the bridge for pedestrian and cyclists since at least 2013.

A cost–benefit report by ACIL Allen consultants for Transport for NSW on options for the bridge was released in September 2013.

In 2015, it was suggested the bridge could be reused to extend the Inner West Light Rail as part of the White Bay redevelopment.

In November 2025 architect Andrew Benn proposed a new design for the bridge incorporating a higher pedestrian bridge that would arch over the existing heritage bridge.

A local campaign group, Climate Change Balmain-Rozelle, has included the bridge as part of a proposal for the Bays West Harbour Path. Sydney's Working Port Coalition has also prepared plans for Glebe island including a restored Glebe Island Bridge.

On 21 February 2026, community members gathered near the bridge and campaigned to give cyclists and pedestrians an easier route between Rozelle and Pyrmont. Balmain MP Kobi Shetty supported the reopening.

In May 2026, the NSW Government announced that part of the Bays West development would involve the reopening of the Glebe Island Bridge.

== Description ==
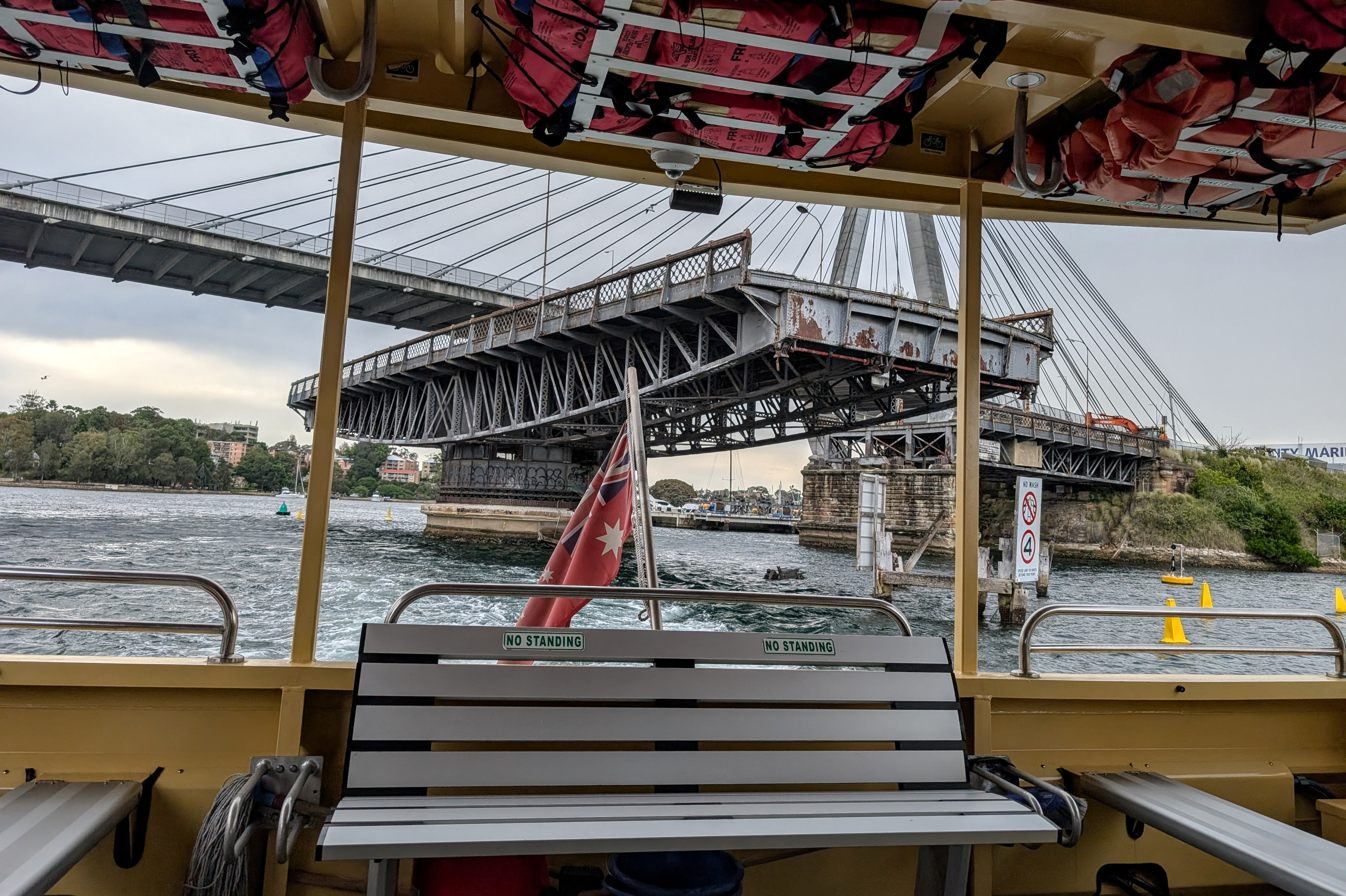
View of the Glebe Island Bridge out the back of the F10 ferry Me-Mel

The Glebe Island Bridge over Johnstons Bay is an electrically-operated, low-level, steel, central-swing-span road bridge. The central swing span is supported by a massive pivot pier, founded on a nest of timber piles capped by concrete, on which it can rotate through ninety degrees to allow passage of maritime traffic. The approach spans are two steel deck on stone-faced piers and stone-lined abutments. The bridge includes constructed embankments on both sides of its western approach.

The bridge has an approach span at each end of 24.7 metres (81 ft), two main spans of 29.3 metres (96 ft) and an overall length of 108 metres (354 ft). The roadway is 12.2 metres (40 ft) wide between kerbs and has a 1.5 metres (4 ft 11 in) wide footway on each side. The central pivot in the waterway is protected by an extensive ring of timber piles. The swing span is mounted on a steel roller track on the cylindrical stone masonry and concrete pivot pier (13.9 metres (46 ft) high and 12.9 metres (42 ft) wide) and is swung by means of a 600 volt motor.

Traffic was controlled by lights and a pair of timber swing-gates on either end which were electronically interlocked to ensure that the bridge cannot open until the gates are closed.

The bridge includes a rare surviving operable mercury-arc rectifier, as well as some early silicon rectifiers, installed in 1960 when the reticulated DC supply was discontinued.

Both Pyrmont and Glebe Island Bridges were electrically operated and could swing in 44 seconds, much faster than contemporary bridges in the world. Pyrmont Bridge, also designed by Percy Allan, has more numerous fixed spans of timber than Glebe Island Bridge where they are of steel supplemented by stone causeways. The swing-span of Glebe Island Bridge is smaller than that of Pyrmont.

High quality Pyrmont yellowblock sandstone is thought to be used for dimension stone and Pyrmont coloured sandstone on the abutment facing and causeway fill.

=== Condition ===
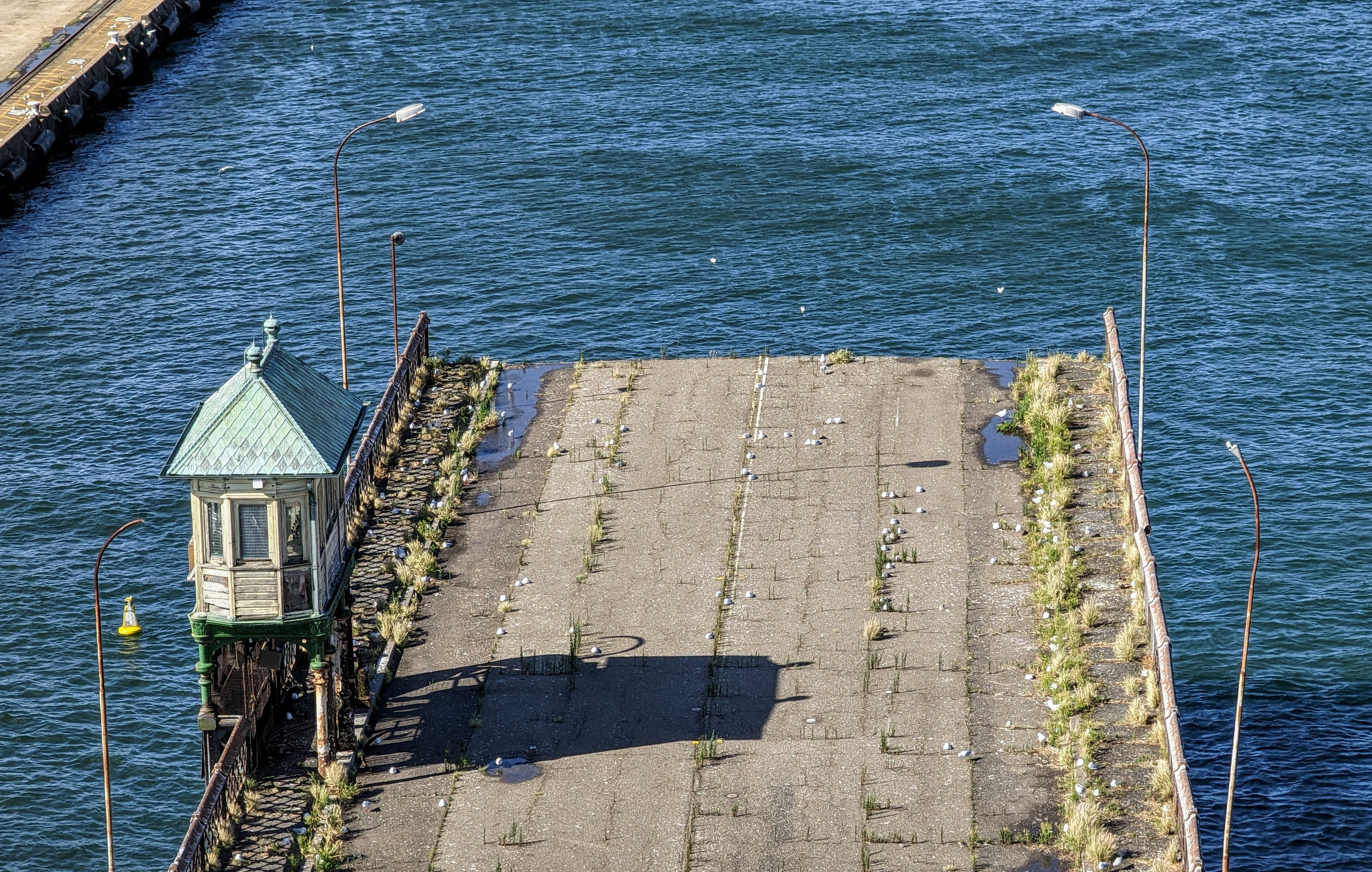
The bridge swing is a sanctuary for gulls.

The Glebe Island Bridge was in good condition in December 1995. The ensuing years have seen little maintenance and the bridge has been left with the swing span in the open position. It is believed to now require extensive catch-up maintenance and repairs. The Glebe Island Bridge remains generally intact and in the form it was when closed to traffic on 3 December 1995.

=== Modifications and dates ===
- 1936 – abutments were underpinned
- 1944 – construction of a stairway to the control cabin
- 1955 – tram tracks and wood blocks replaced by Bitumen
- 1959 – electrical modifications were made as Sydney County Council became the source
- 1982 – bridge control cabin destroyed by fire and replaced with modern electrics

No other modifications apart from upgrades to traffic signals and signage.

== Heritage listing ==
As at 23 April 2013, the Glebe Island Bridge, across Johnstons Bay, is of state significance as it demonstrates one of the earliest examples of an electric-powered swing bridge in Australia. Technically, it is a complementary structure to the already acclaimed Pyrmont Swing Bridge, and has all the same significant features, including the electrically-driven swing span. Both bridges were designed by Percy Allan, a highly regarded Australian bridge designer of the late 19th and early 20th century. Both represent the only examples of such types of bridges in New South Wales and are still operable.

Glebe Island Bridge was listed on the New South Wales State Heritage Register on 29 November 2013 having satisfied the following criteria.

The place is important in demonstrating the course, or pattern, of cultural or natural history in New South Wales.

Glebe Island Bridge has historic significance at the state level as it demonstrates one of the earliest examples of an electrical powered bridge of its type in Australia. The Glebe Island Bridge, along with Pyrmont Bridge, both designed by Percy Allan at the turn of the century were innovative in their day and attracted worldwide engineering interest, with Allan invited to present a paper on the design of its older twin, the Pyrmont Bridge, to the Institution of Civil Engineers in London in 1907.

The Glebe Island Bridge has been an important item of infrastructure in the history of Sydney, Australia's famous harbour city and the capital of New South Wales, for over 90 years. The bridge was a vital component of the "five bridges" route from the city to the northern and western suburbs. The history of this crossing, going back to 1892, is closely associated with the economic and social development of Sydney at the end of the 19th century.

The place has a strong or special association with a person, or group of persons, of importance of cultural or natural history of New South Wales's history.

Glebe Island Bridge is of state significance for its close associations with Percy Allan (1861–1930), a highly regarded Australian bridge designer of the late 19th and early 20th century. Percy Allan was responsible for the introduction of American timber bridge practice to NSW, and designed over 500 bridges in NSW. The bridge is also associated with JJC Bradfield (1867-1943), later known for his work on the Sydney Harbour Bridge.

It is associated with the NSW Department of Public Works, a highly regarded, prolific and historically significant organisation in the history of NSW.

The place is important in demonstrating aesthetic characteristics and/or a high degree of creative or technical achievement in New South Wales.

Glebe Island Bridge is of state significance as its design and construction represented a significant technical achievement in the era that it was built. The bridge's innovative design included: the size of the swing span and speed of operation; development of steel bridge truss; caisson construction; design of the swing span bearing; and use of electric power.

The design of the Glebe Island Bridge represents the pinnacle of nineteenth century engineering and material technology, prior to the development of locally produced modern steel.

Aesthetically, the bridge is an impressive structure, sited in the middle of a wide and busy waterway, giving it landmark qualities that are apparent from numerous vantage points around Sydney Harbour.

The place has a strong or special association with a particular community or cultural group in New South Wales for social, cultural or spiritual reasons.

The Glebe Island Bridge is valued by the Sydney community for its significant contribution to the social and commercial development of Sydney and the inner western suburbs, as demonstrated by the public statements and interest in its conservation demonstrated in the broad-ranging community consultation undertaken for the Bays Precinct by the NSW Government.

The place has potential to yield information that will contribute to an understanding of the cultural or natural history of New South Wales.

The bridge is a fine example of late nineteenth and early twentieth century technology, and is almost completely in original condition. The combined structural, mechanical and electrical efficiency of the bridge established it as an epitome of well designed bridge building of the time.

The place possesses uncommon, rare or endangered aspects of the cultural or natural history of New South Wales.

Glebe Island Bridge is of state significance as it is one of only two examples of an electrically-operated steel swing bridge in New South Wales.

It is the second oldest (after its older twin, the Pyrmont Bridge) surviving bridge across a Sydney Harbour waterway. The two bridges remain the only large, electrically-operated swing spans in Australia.

The Bridge includes a rare surviving, operable Mercury-arc Rectifier, as well as some early silicon rectifiers, both of which were important early electrical technologies which have been superseded by solid-state technology. Mercury arc rectifiers are now rare outside of museum situations and only a very few remain in their original context in Australia.

The place is important in demonstrating the principal characteristics of a class of cultural or natural places/environments in New South Wales.

Glebe Island Bridge is of state significance as it features all the significant structural and technical features of a swing-span bridge.

It is an excellent example of one of the various types of opening bridges, which are the economical solution to constructing road bridges across navigable waterways, where high-level bridges are possible but unaffordable. Opening bridges have been a crucial factor in the economic development of NSW since the late nineteenth century, with its high-level of industrialisation but relatively low population levels on an international scale.

== See also ==
- List of bridges in Sydney
