= Ride the Night Away =

Single by Jimmy Barnes

from the album For the Working Class Man
- Released: February 1986
- Label: Mushroom Records
- Songwriter(s): Steven Van Zandt, Steve Jordan
- Producer(s): Mark Opitz

Jimmy Barnes singles chronology
"Working Class Man" (1985)	"Ride the Night Away" (1986)	"Good Times" (1986)

"Ride the Night Away" is a song by Australian rock musician, Jimmy Barnes and released in February 1986 as the third and final single from Barnes' second studio album, For the Working Class Man. The song peaked at number 39 on the Australian Kent Music Report.

== Music video ==
A music video was produced to promote the single.

== Track listing ==
7" Single (K 9931)

- Side A "Ride the Night Away" - 4:20
- Side B "Paradise" (Remixed Version) - 3:04

== Charts ==
Chart (1986)	Peak Position
Australia (Kent Music Report)	39
