= Pyrmont Bridge =

Heritage-listed bridge across Cockle Bay in Sydney, New South Wales, Australia

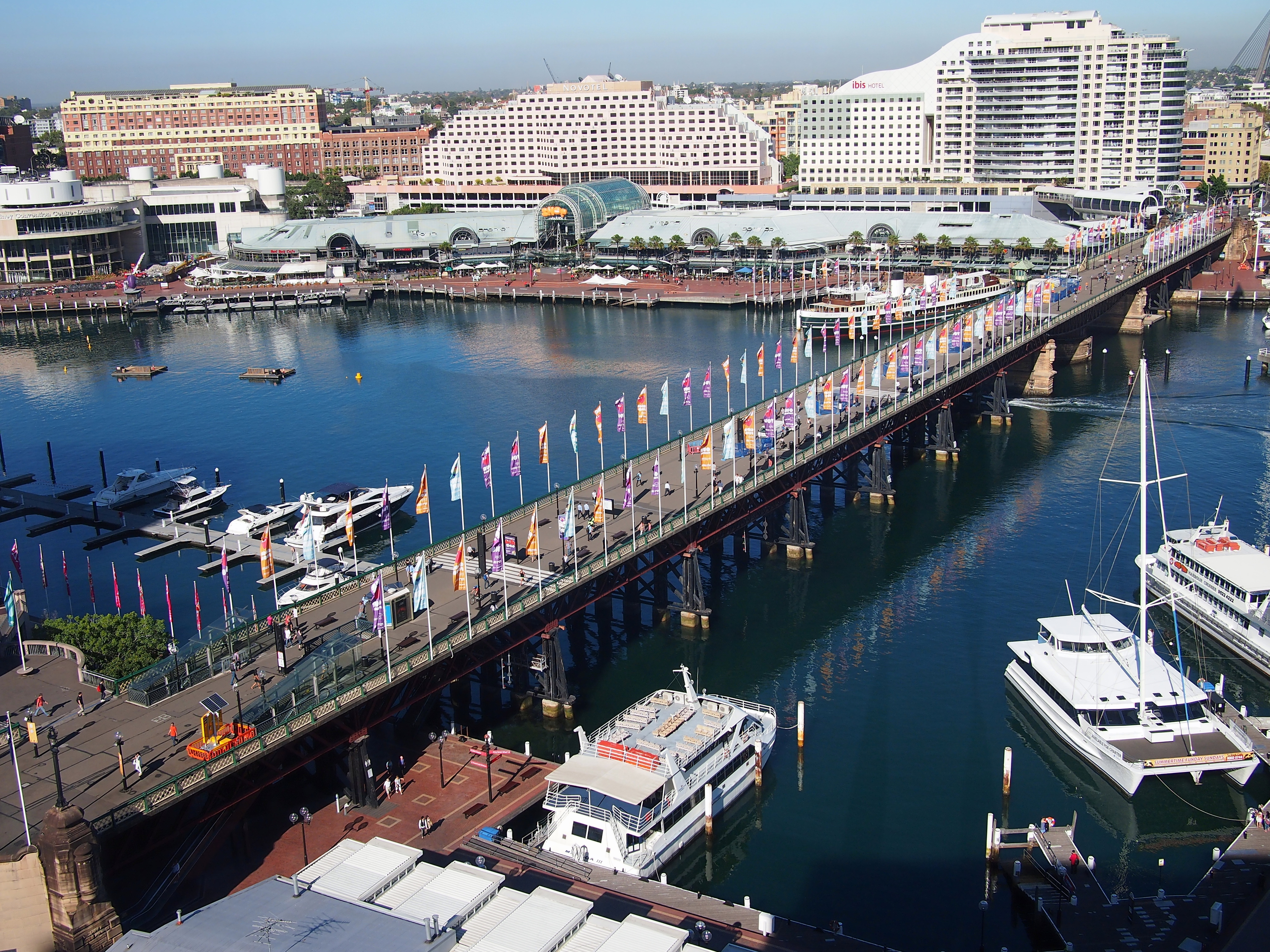
- Pyrmont Bridge in 2014.
- Coordinates: 33°52′14″S 151°12′02″E
- Carries: Pedestrian and bicycle traffic
- Crosses: Cockle Bay
- Locale: Darling Harbour, Sydney, New South Wales, Australia
- Owner: Sydney Harbour Foreshore Authority
- Maintained by: Sydney Harbour Foreshore Authority
- Heritage status: New South Wales State Heritage Register; Engineers Australia (1992) National Engineering Landmark
- Preceded by: Pyrmont Bridge (1858–1902)
- Followed by: Western Distributor (1981–present)

Characteristics
- Design: Swing bridge
- Material: Ironbark timber; Steel central spans
- Total length: 369 metres (1,211 ft)
- No. of spans: 14
- Clearance above: 6.5 metres (21 ft)

History
- Engineering design by: Percy Allan
- Construction start: 6 December 1899
- Construction cost: £112,569
- Opened: 28 June 1902

Statistics
- Daily traffic: ~14,000 pedestrians

New South Wales Heritage Register
- Official name: Pyrmont Bridge
- Type: State heritage (built)
- Designated: 28 June 2002
- Reference no.: 1618
- Type: Road Bridge
- Category: Transport - Land

Location
- Interactive map of Pyrmont Bridge

The Pyrmont Bridge, a heritage-listed swing bridge across Cockle Bay, is located in Darling Harbour, part of Port Jackson, west of the central business district in the City of Sydney local government area of New South Wales, Australia. Opened in 1902, the bridge initially carried motor vehicle traffic via the Pyrmont Bridge Road between the central business district and Pyrmont. Since 1981 the bridge has carried pedestrian and bicycle traffic only, as motor vehicles were diverted to adjacent freeway overpasses. The bridge was added to the New South Wales State Heritage Register on 28 June 2002, the centenary of its opening.

The music video for Jimmy Barnes' 1985 song "I'd Die to be with You Tonight" was filmed on the Bridge, with it in the swing-out configuration.

== History ==
The first Pyrmont Bridge was opened on 17 March 1858, and was a wooden pile bridge with an iron centre 'swing panel' to allow ships to pass. In the first two weeks 20,000 pedestrians paid the one penny toll. It was also crossed by "932 carts and drays, 43 gigs, 17 carriages and 125 horse and rider." When the NSW government bought the bridge for £52,500 from the Pyrmont Bridge Company in 1884, they abolished the toll.

The wooden Pyrmont Bridge vanished with the construction in 1902 of a new steel bridge which took 33 months to build and was completed in time to accommodate Sydney's first cars. In 1891, competitive designs were invited for a new bridge on the south side of the old structure, but due to the economic depression no further action was taken until 1894, when, after prolonged inquiry and the consideration of about twenty six schemes, the Parliamentary Standing Committee on Public Works decided in favour of a design for a steel bridge with a swing span of 16 metres (54 ft), affording two 21 metres (70 ft) clear fairways, submitted by the Department of Public Works (PWD).

The foundations stone of the new bridge was laid by Edward William O'Sullivan, State Minister for Works, on 6 September 1899; and the bridge opened for traffic on 28 June 1902, by Harry Rawson, Governor of New South Wales. Powered by electricity from the Ultimo Powerhouse, the swing bridge could be opened and closed in 45 seconds. Percy Allan, PWD Engineer-in-Chief of bridge design, designed the Pyrmont Bridge and over 550 bridges.

As part of the construction of the Western Distributor project, the eastern abutment of Pyrmont Bridge was demolished and redirected in 1980, with City-bound traffic crossing the bridge temporarily funnelled onto a northbound viaduct to enter the city or access the Harbour Bridge via King Street, while the viaduct across the southern end of Cockle Bay was being constructed. Just a year later, the Western Distributor viaduct to King Street was completed across the eastern end of Pyrmont Bridge, the temporary access ramp from the bridge to the viaduct was removed, and the bridge was permanently closed to traffic. The Government ordered the bridge to be demolished, but later revoked this decision. In 1984, the Darling Harbour Authority was formed with the task of redeveloping Darling Harbour. The Pyrmont Bridge was restored, with the swing span in full working order, and incorporated as a pedestrian bridge in the redevelopment of Darling Harbour. An elevated pedestrian walkway was constructed across the Western Distributor viaduct to link the eastern end of the bridge to Market Street at surface level. A section of the Monorail was built across the bridge at this time. The Pyrmont Bridge was re-opened to pedestrian traffic in 1988.

Following the end of the monorail's 25 years of operation in July 2013, the monorail track was removed from the bridge. Some changes that had been made to the bridge during the construction of the monorail were then reversed, including the conversion of the electrical braking system back to a hand-operated system, and the relocation of the control cab to the middle of the bridge.

After the removal of the monorail, the Sydney Harbour Foreshore Authority (SHFA) began discussing plans to give the bridge a facelift to coincide with Darling Harbour's $2.5 billion redevelopment. The SHFA commissioned a design brief to look at options for future enhancements including furniture, lighting and pop-up cafes. "Pyrmont Bridge will remain open and accessible to the public...Any future use proposals must not impact on the bridge's surviving historic fabric, or its technological significance, or prevent the continued use as an open swing span bridge". The NSW Government invested in a $23 million renewal of the Bridge. The project is part of a $73 million commitment over the next four years to protect heritage assets along Sydney Harbour foreshore. The projects include $15 million to replace ferry wharves in Cockle Bay and $20 million to refurbish public spaces at Campbell's Cove at the Rocks and Darling Harbour.

The Bridge has been repaired in 2018 and 2025.

== Description ==
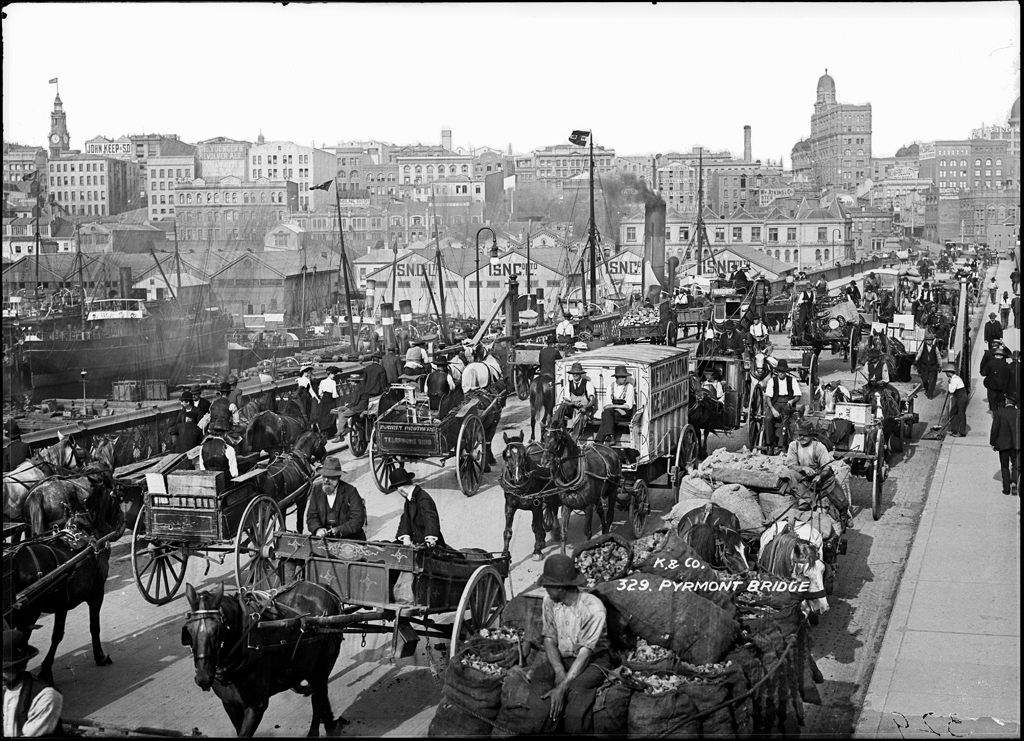
Pyrmont Bridge, circa 1902–1917.

The foundation stone for the new bridge was laid on 6 December 1899 by E. W. O'Sullivan and the bridge was opened for traffic on 28 June 1902 by the Governor of New South Wales, Harry Rawson. The bridge was designed under the engineering supervision of Percy Allan. The bridge had one of the largest swing spans in the world at the time of its construction and it was one of the first to be powered by electricity. Allan also designed the similar Glebe Island Swing Bridge, completed in 1903.

The Pyrmont Bridge is 369 metres (1,211 ft) long and cost £112,500 to build. The bridge is made up of 14 spans with Australian ironbark timber used on 12 spans, while the two central spans, which swing, are constructed from steel. The swingspan weighs 1,000 tonnes (1,100 short tons) and is supported on a base made from concrete and Hawkesbury Sandstone. The base is filled with mass concrete and weighs 6,800 tonnes (7,500 short tons). The swingspan is 13 metres (43 ft) in diameter and 19 metres (62 ft) deep. The water is 6.5 metres (21 ft) deep and the base extends a further 10 metres (33 ft) below the sea floor.

Pyrmont Bridge takes approximately 60 seconds to open completely to 83 degrees. It has to be opened for vessels more than 7 metres (23 ft) high. Vessels/barges up to 21.5 metres (71 ft) wide can pass through the channel once the Bridge has been opened. Pyrmont Bridge is driven by the original two 50 horsepower (37 kW) 600 V DC General Electric type 57 electric motors. Manual drum-type General Electric tramway controllers are used to drive the motors for the swingspan and gates. Power to operate the bridge was originally drawn from the Ultimo Power House (now the Powerhouse Museum). As a young engineer, J. J. C. Bradfield helped design the sandstone abutment walls at each end of Pyrmont Bridge.

In 1981 the Wran government ordered the bridge to be demolished, but later revoked this decision. The bridge was closed to vehicular traffic on 7 August 1981, the traffic having been diverted over the Western Distributor freeway structures built further south of Cockle Bay, and it was then re-opened as a pedestrian bridge as part of the re-development of Darling Harbour as a recreational pedestrian precinct. The swing bridge remains in operation, and opens to a schedule managed by the Sydney Harbour Foreshore Authority.

In 1992 Engineers Australia recognised the bridge as a National Engineering Landmark.

=== Modifications ===
As built, the bridge had stone abutments on both ends, the western end connecting it to Union Street and the eastern end connecting it to Market Street. In 1980, most of the eastern abutment was demolished as part of the construction of the Western Distributor. A section connected to the bridge remains, and the isolated easternmost plinth and lamppost can still be seen near the corner of Market Street and Sussex Street. In 1980, the eastern end of the bridge was initially connected via a ramp to the viaduct leading north to King Street, but this was demolished in 1981 when the rest of the viaduct was completed around the southern end of Cockle Bay. Only a narrow pedestrian and cycle path still connects the eastern end of the bridge to the viaduct and to King Street. A separate pedestrian bridge was constructed over the Western Distributor roadway to connect the eastern end of the bridge to Market Street at surface level.

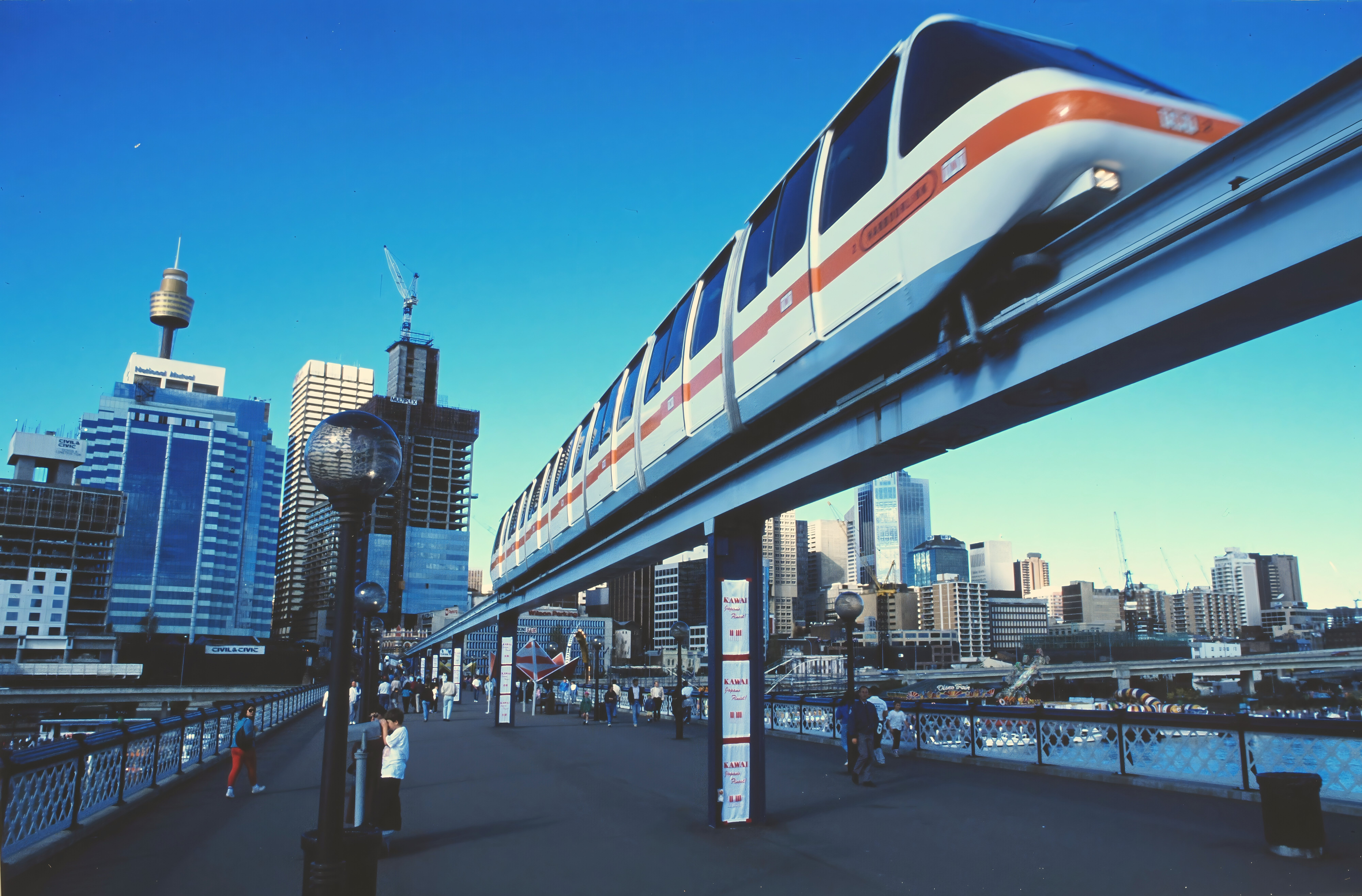
The monorail crossing Pyrmont Bridge, photographed in 1990

Between 1988 and 2013, the bridge carried the elevated Sydney Monorail, which travelled between Darling Harbour and the Sydney central business district. The monorail track rested on a pivot that allowed the track to remain stationary while the bridge swung underneath. The pivot allowed the monorail to continue to cross the bridge even when the bridge was opened. The construction of the monorail led to some changes to the bridge, including the electrification of the previously hand-operated brakes used to control the bridge's swing, and the relocation of the control cab six metres away from the middle of the bridge (so that the control cab would not hit the monorail track when the bridge is open).

Upon the closure of the Monorail in June 2013 the hydraulic lifting rams and support infrastructure were removed, and the control cab was relocated to its original position in the middle of the bridge.

== Heritage listing ==
As at 24 July 2001, Pyrmont Bridge is an item of State heritage significance for its aesthetic, historical and scientific cultural values. An essential link between the city and the inner western suburbs, Pyrmont Bridge is closely associated with the economic and social development of Sydney at the end of the 19th century.

Pyrmont Bridge is closely associated with Percy Allan, PWD Engineer-in-Chief of bridge design, who was responsible for the introduction of American timber bridge practice to NSW and designed over 500 bridges in NSW. The quality of the carved stonework of the piers and portals added to the aesthetic appeal of the bridge.

At the time of construction the swing span of Pyrmont Bridge was one of the largest in the world. It was one of the first swing bridges to be powered by electricity. The timber approach spans demonstrate a rare example of deck type Allan trusses; there being no other known example. The bridge's Australian design and technological innovation was a source of pride for the people of NSW.

Despite the demolition of the eastern approach to the bridge and the construction of the monorail track, Pyrmont Bridge retains its essential heritage values.

Pyrmont Bridge was listed on the New South Wales State Heritage Register on 28 June 2002 having satisfied the following criteria.

The place is important in demonstrating the course, or pattern, of cultural or natural history in New South Wales.

Pyrmont Bridge, an essential link between the city and the inner western suburbs, is closely associated with the economic and social development of Sydney at the end of the 19th century. Pyrmont Bridge is closely associated with Percy Allan, PWD Engineer-in-Chief of bridge design, with the assistance of Bradfield and Gordon Edgell. Allan was responsible for the introduction of American timber bridge practice to NSW, and designed over 500 bridges in NSW.

The place has a strong or special association with a person, or group of persons, of importance of cultural or natural history of New South Wales's history. The place is important in demonstrating aesthetic characteristics and/or a high degree of creative or technical achievement in New South Wales.

Pyrmont Bridge demonstrates a high level of aesthetic value in the stonework and carved stone detailing of the bridge approaches, pivot pier and rest piers, as well as displaying the high aesthetic values of the timber and steel bridge structures . The watchhouse also demonstrates fine architectural detailing.

The place has a strong or special association with a particular community or cultural group in New South Wales for social, cultural or spiritual reasons.

When completed the Pyrmont Bridge was regarded as a landmark in the development of Australian engineering skills and technological innovation, being favourably compared with the technical achievements of the recently completed Tower Bridge in London. Its Australian design, technological innovation and construction made it a source of pride for the people of NSW.

The place has potential to yield information that will contribute to an understanding of the cultural or natural history of New South Wales.

When completed the Pyrmont Bridge was regarded as a landmark in the development of Australian engineering skills and technological innovation, being favourably compared with the technical achievements of the recently completed Tower Bridge in London. The bridge's innovative design included; the size of the swing span and speed of operation; development of the timber bridge truss; caisson construction; design of the swing span bearings; and use of electric power. The design of the approach spans represent the highest level of development of the timber truss.

The place possesses uncommon, rare or endangered aspects of the cultural or natural history of New South Wales.

The timber approach spans demonstrate a rare example of deck type Allan trusses; there being no other known example.

== Gallery ==
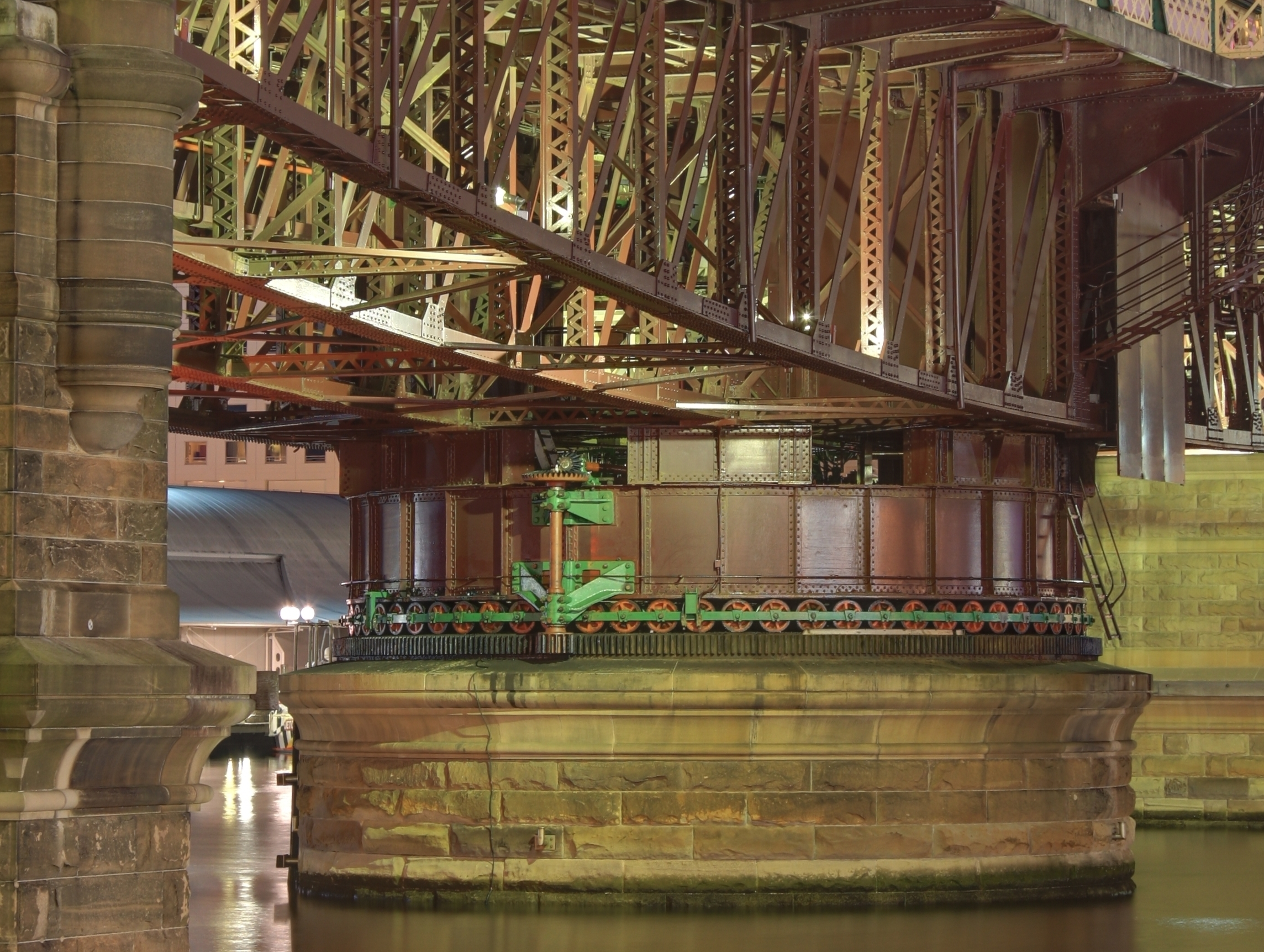
The point at which the bridge turns

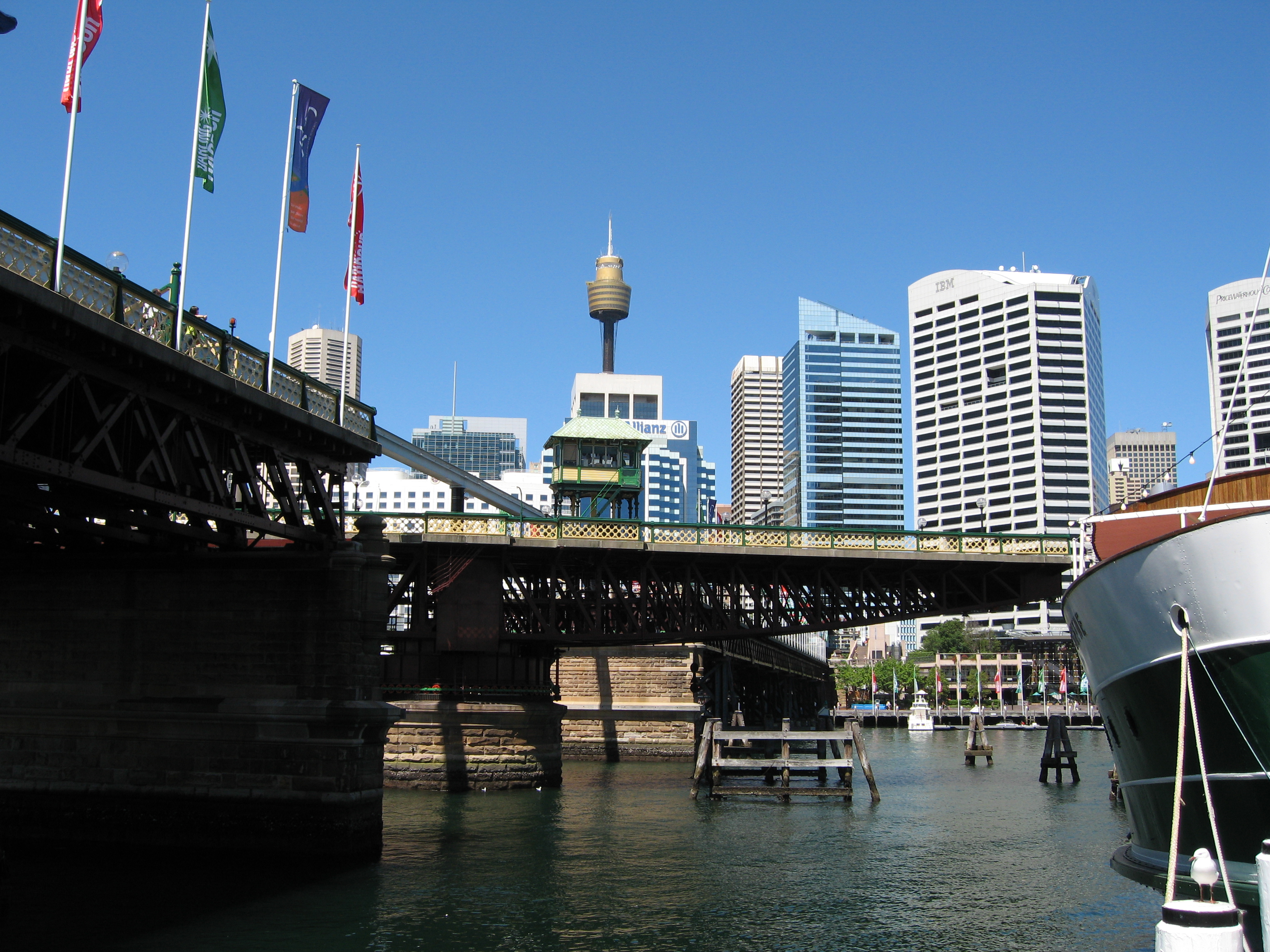
Pyrmont Bridge mid-swing.

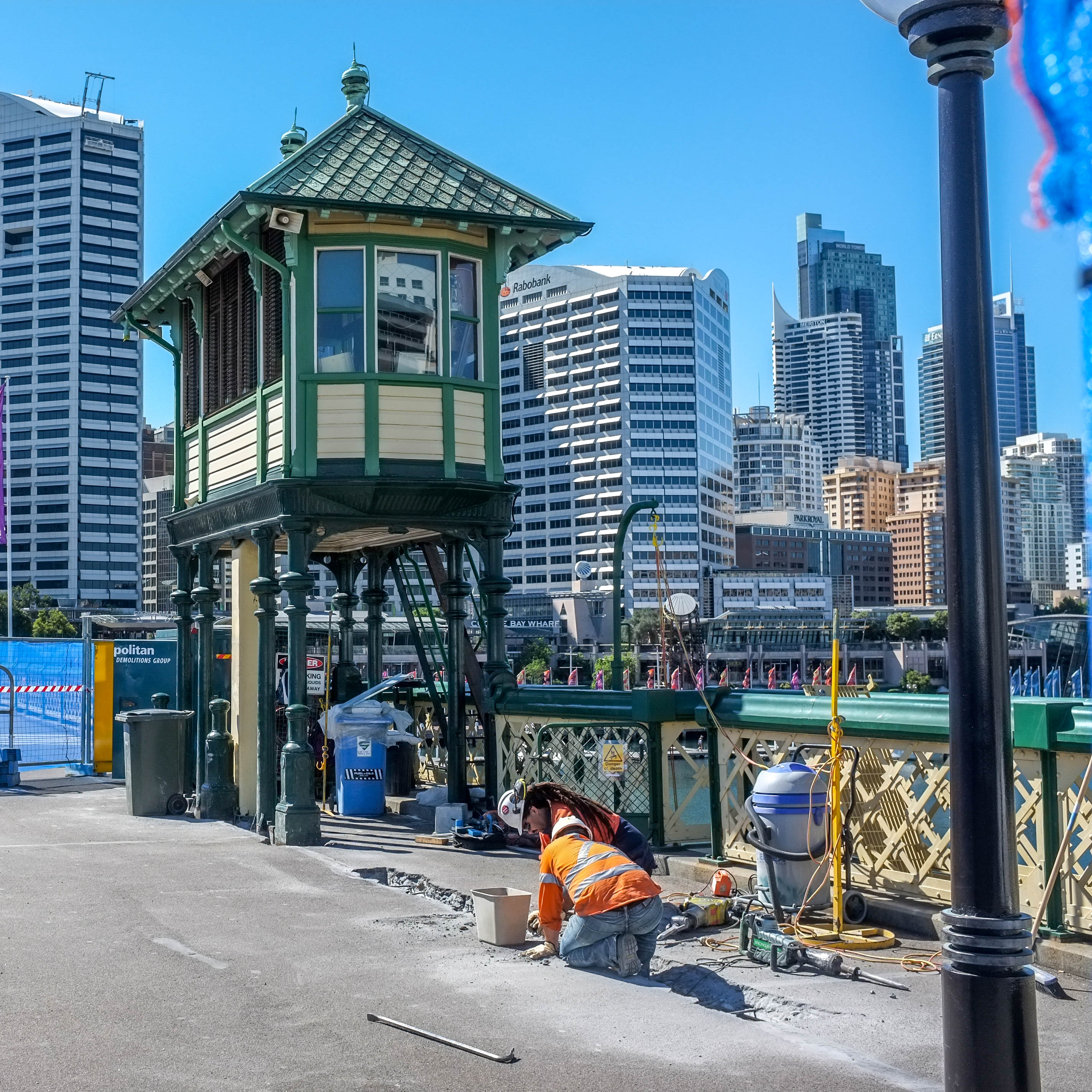
The control cab for bridge's swinging operation being moved back to the middle of the bridge in 2013, after the removal of the monorail.

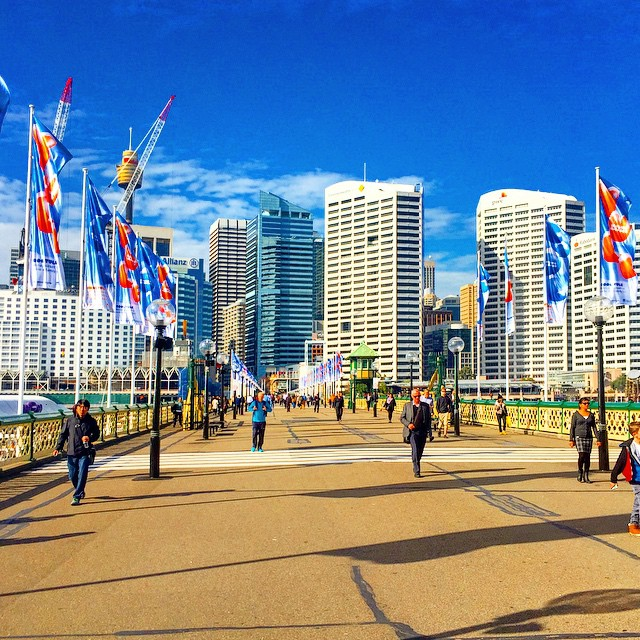
Looking at CBD

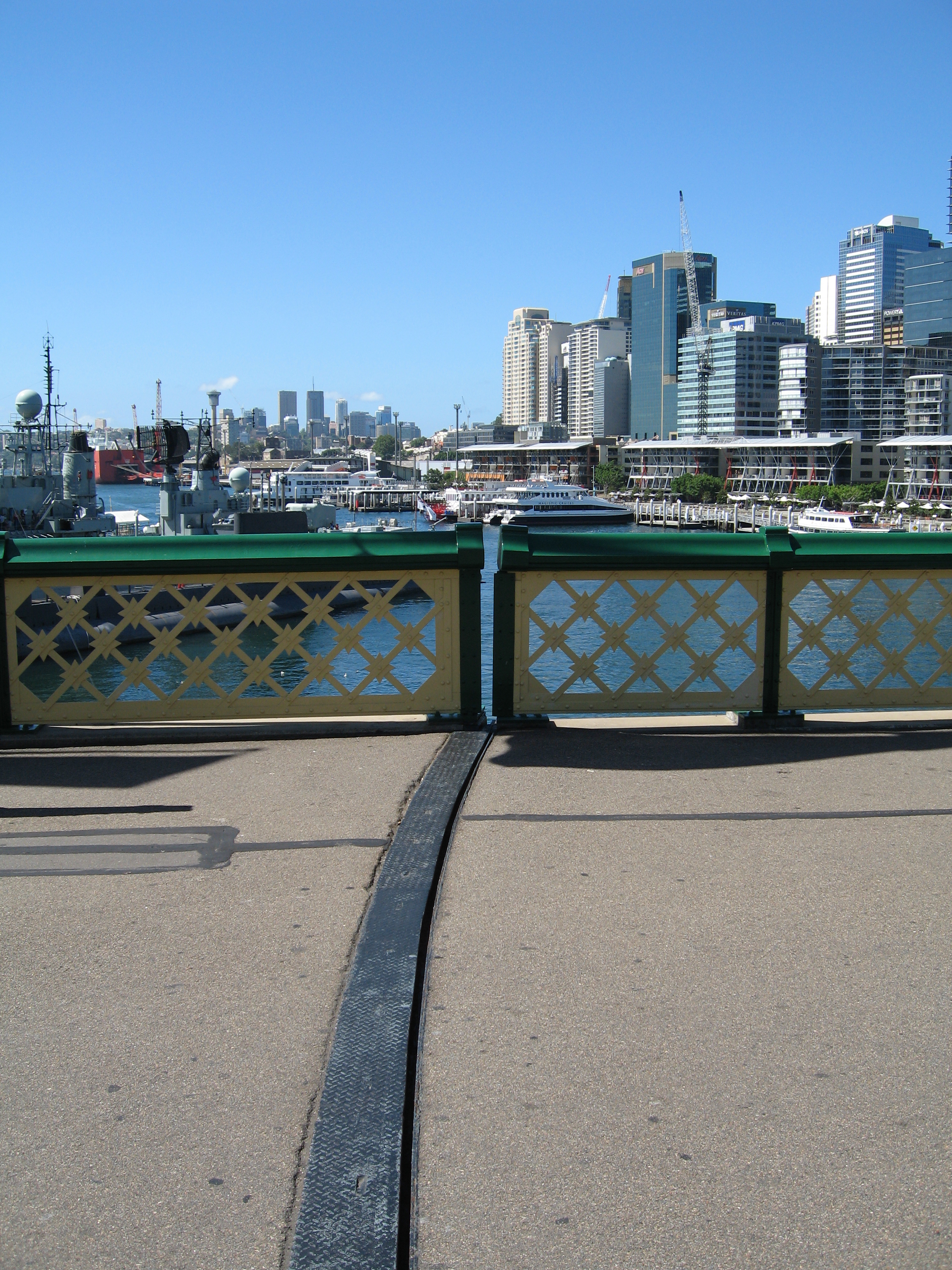
The arc-shaped split between bridge sections is shown here

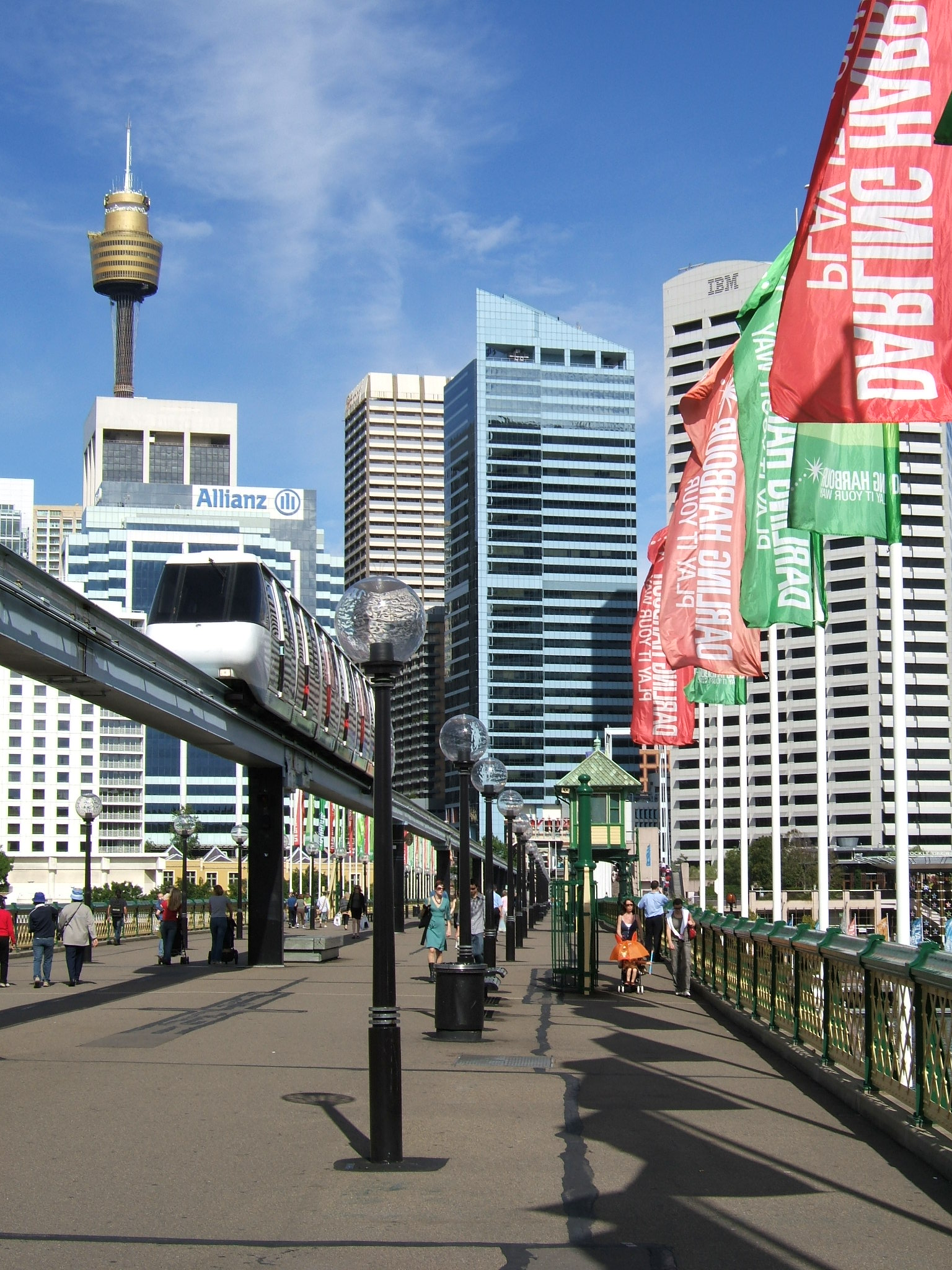
Pyrmont Bridge (with monorail)

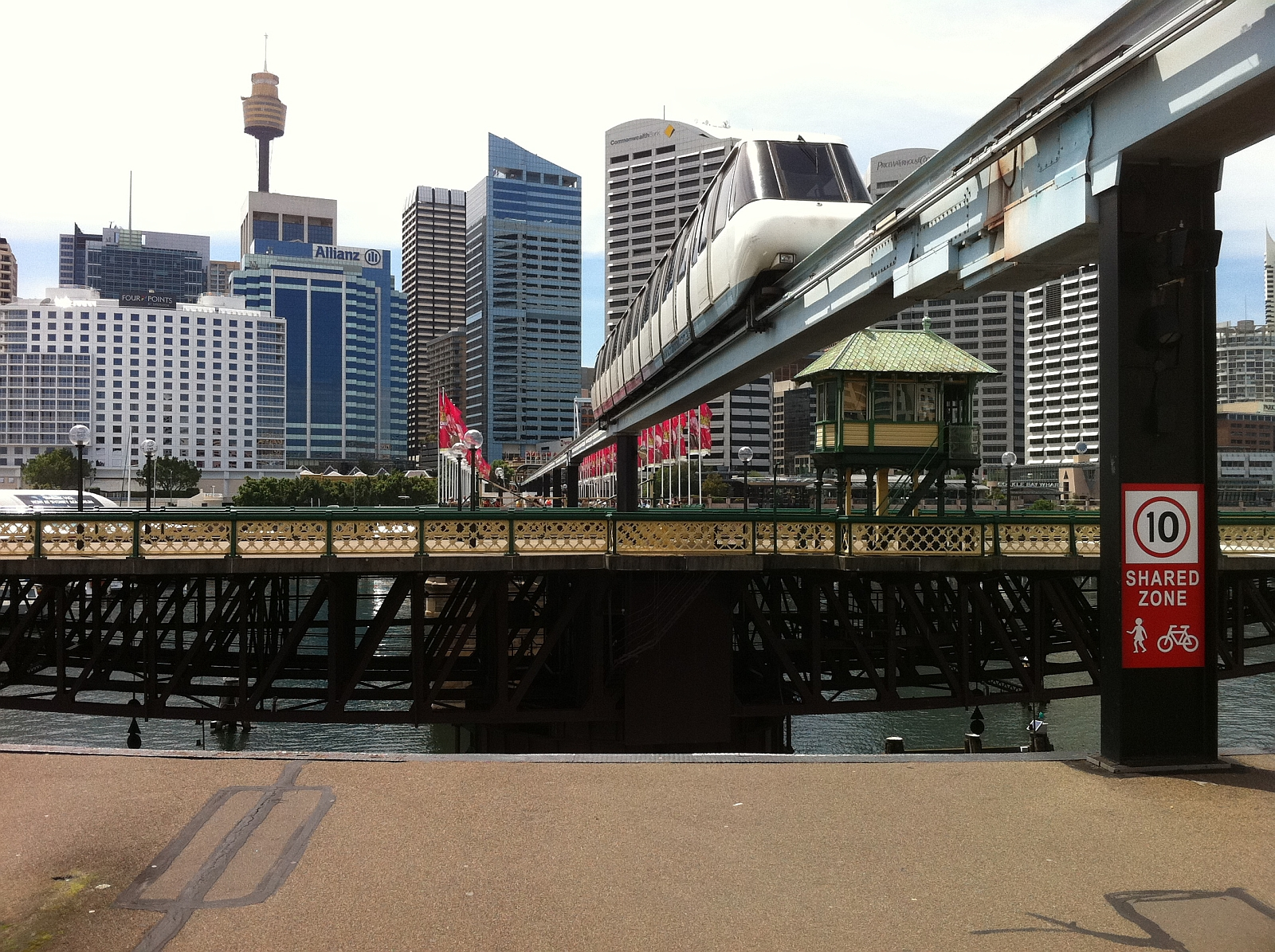
Monorail travelling over Pyrmont Bridge while the bridge is open

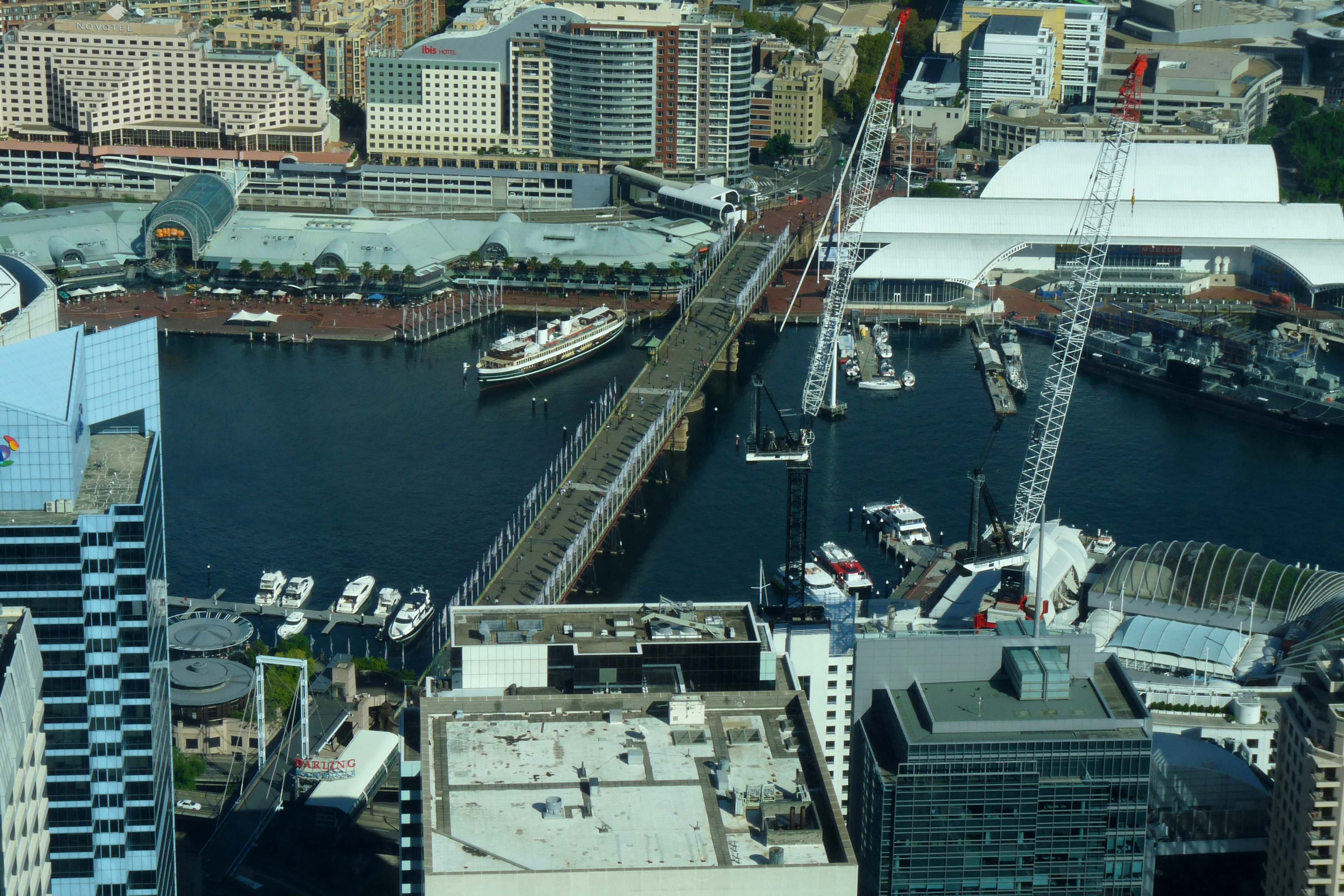
The bridge as viewed from the Sydney Tower

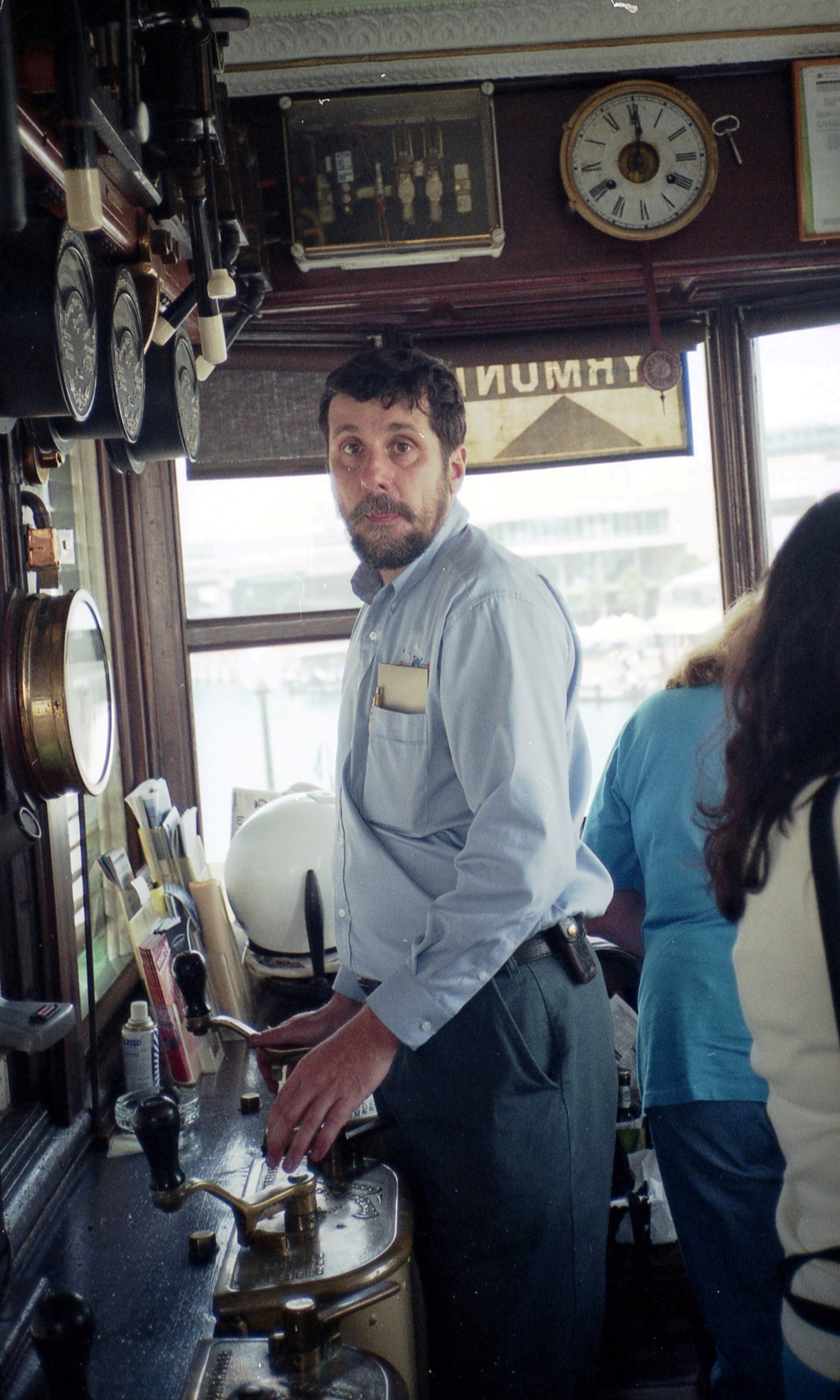
Operator in control cabin

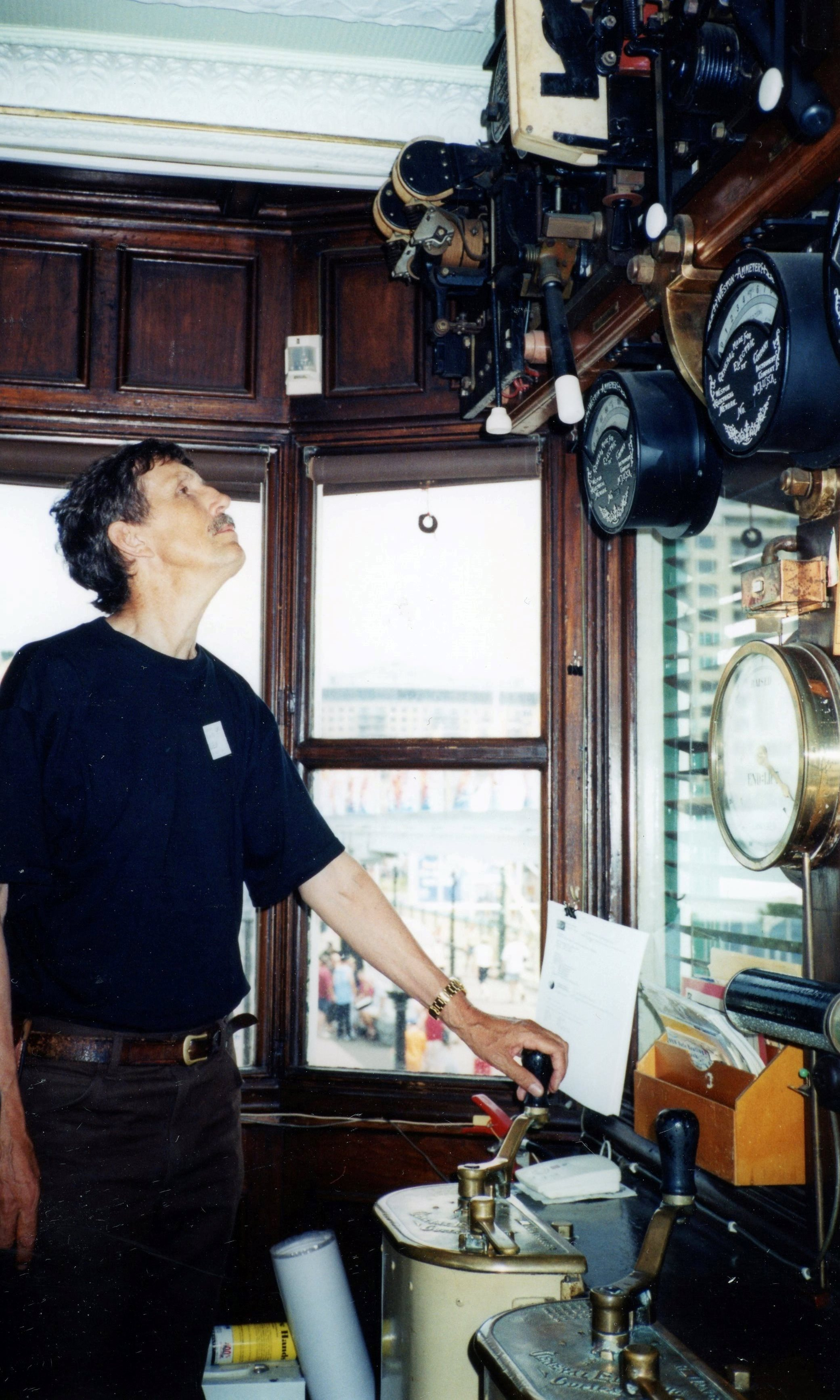
Visitor in control cabin

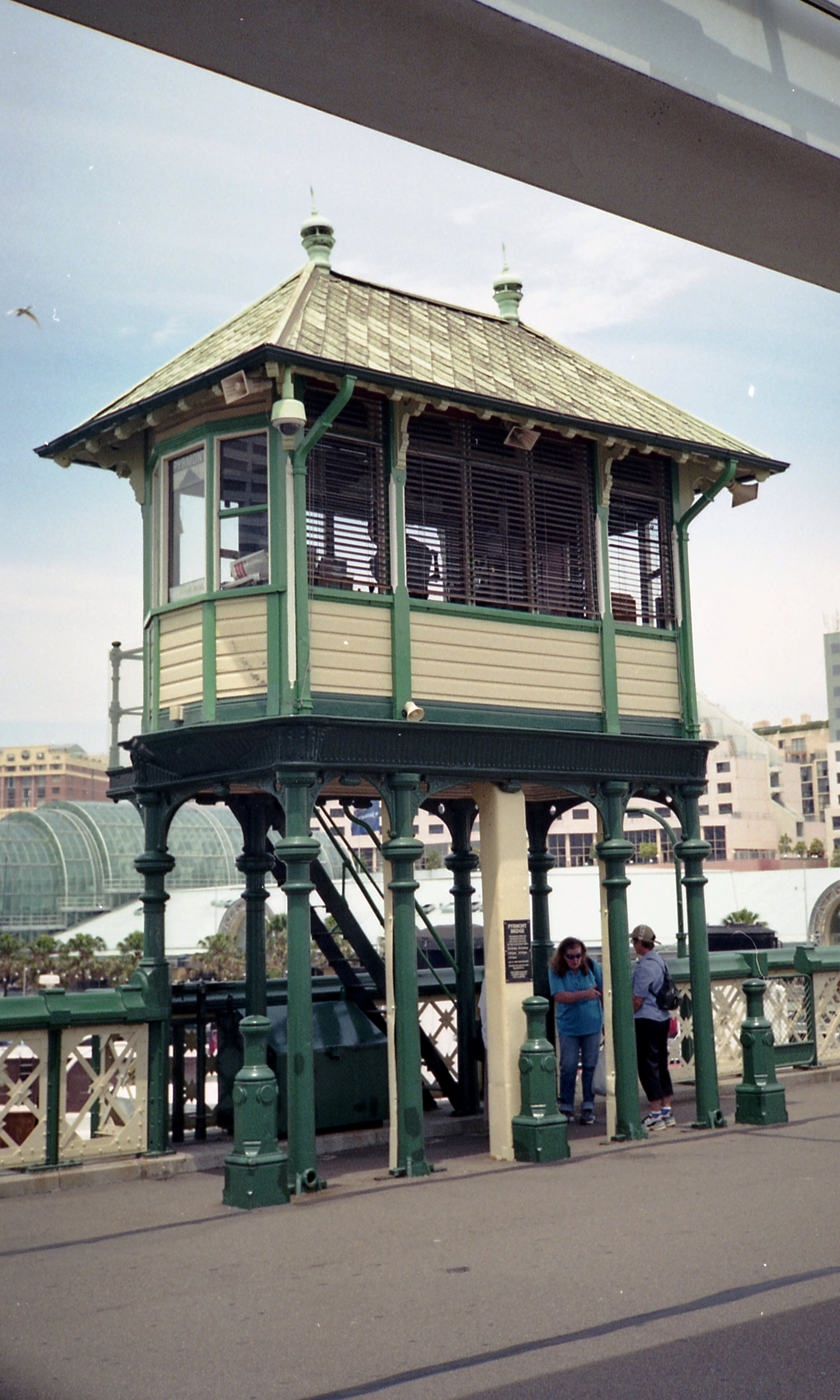
Control cabin, January 2004

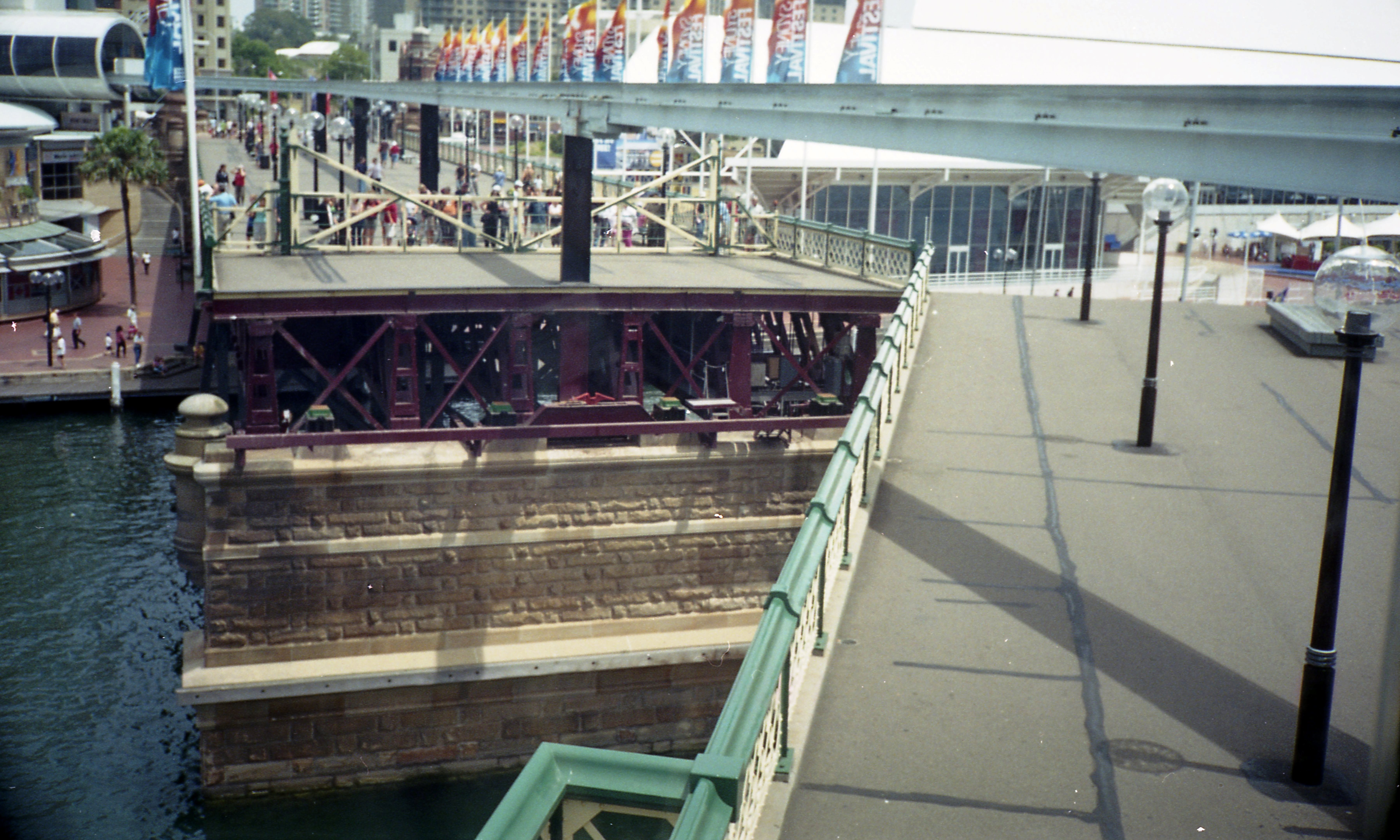
Partly opened; view from cabin

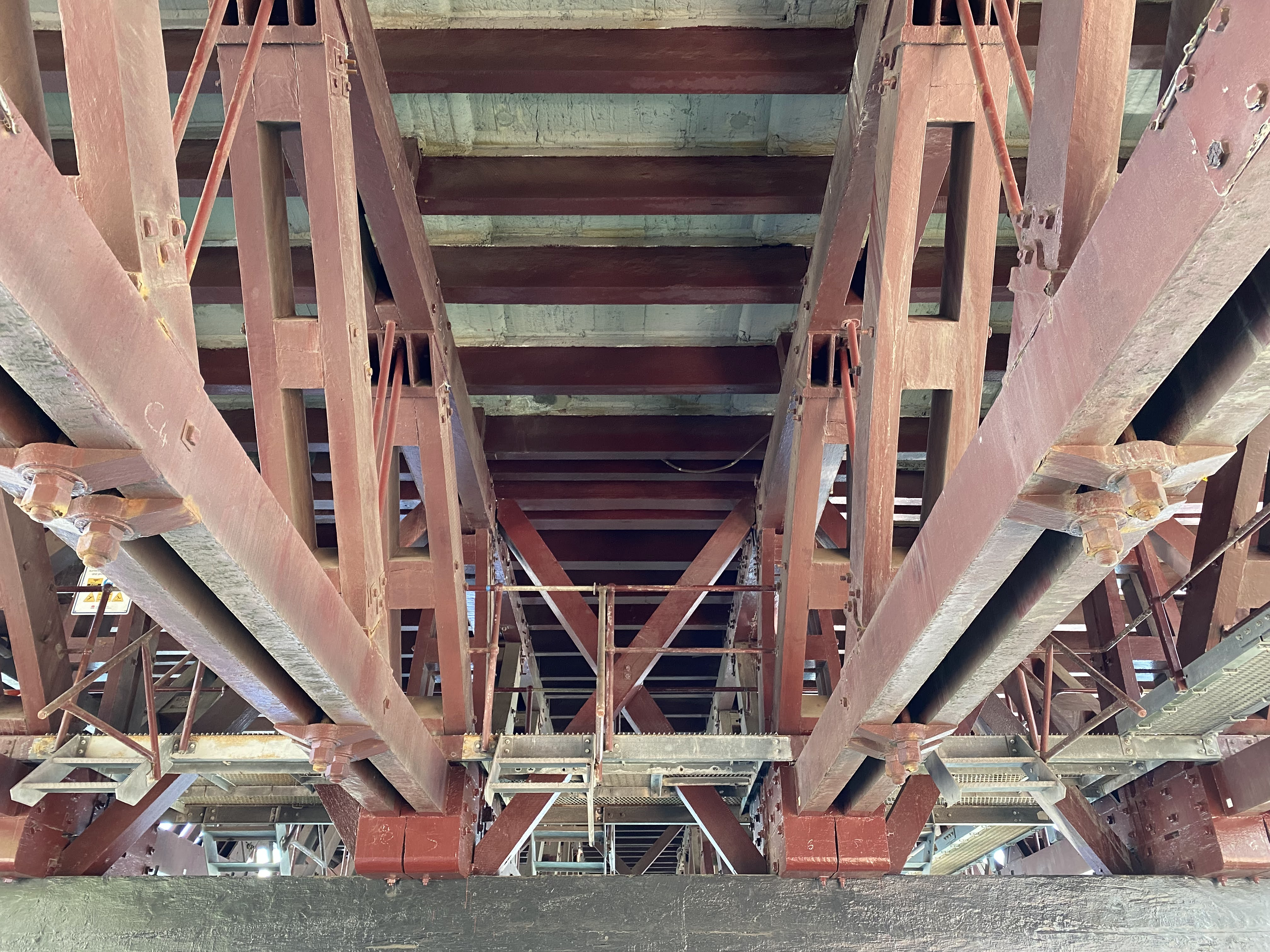
Underside of the bridge

== See also ==
- List of bridges in Sydney
- Historic bridges of New South Wales
