= Bodyswerve =

Studio album by Jimmy Barnes
- Released: 10 September 1984
- Studio: Rhinoceros Studios, Sydney
- Genre: Hard rock
- Label: Mushroom
- Producer: Jimmy Barnes, Mark Opitz

Jimmy Barnes chronology
Bodyswerve (1984)	For the Working Class Man (1985)

Singles from Bodyswerve
- 1. "No Second Prize" Released: August 1984; 2. "Promise Me You'll Call" Released: November 1984; 3. "Daylight" Released: January 1985

Bodyswerve is the debut solo album by former Cold Chisel vocalist Jimmy Barnes. The album was released on 10 September 1984 and went to No. 1 on the Kent Music Report Albums Chart. It contains covers of tracks by Sam Cooke and Janis Joplin. "No Second Prize" was the album's first single.

== Details ==
"No Second Prize" was originally demoed by Cold Chisel but never recorded by them. It was written in 1980 as a tribute to Chisel roadies Alan Dallow and Billy Rowe, who died in a truck crash. "Daylight" was also originally a Cold Chisel song. That band's version later appeared on the 1994 album Teenage Love. A version of this song was also used in a TV commercial promoting milk. "Vision", "Daylight", "No Second Prize", "Promise Me You'll Call" and "Thick Skinned" were all remixed for inclusion on 1985's For the Working Class Man. The album title is a football term for a feint.

Barnes later said, "One of the reasons my first album was so rough was that I was jumping in the deep end. I didn't have a clue, but I thought that was the best way to go."

== Assembling the band ==
For his first solo recording, Barnes said he wanted people he felt "safe with". Drummer Ray Arnott had recorded with Barnes on Cold Chisel's final album, Twentieth Century. Bruce Howe had been a bass player with Fraternity that Barnes had sung with for a short time in 1975. Barnes said, "As far as I could tell, Bruce only played upstrokes, so his sound was very aggressive." Mal Eastick had played with Stars. Seeking a second guitarist to make the band more "hard rock", Barnes chose ex-Dingoes guitarist Chris Stockley, who played, "old-style rock, like Little Richard and Gene Vincent".

== Track listing ==
All tracks composed by Jimmy Barnes; except where indicated

1. "Vision"
2. "Daylight"
3. "Promise Me You'll Call"
4. "No Second Prize"
5. "Boys Cry Out for War"
6. "Paradise"
7. "A Change is Gonna Come" (Sam Cooke)
8. "Thick Skinned" (Barnes, Ray Arnott)
9. "Piece of My Heart" (Jerry Ragovoy, Bert Berns)
10. "Fire" (Eastick)
11. "World's on Fire" (Barnes, Richard Clapton, Eastick, Howe, Arnott, Stockley)

== Personnel ==
- Jimmy Barnes - lead vocals
- Mal Eastick, Chris Stockley, Jimmy Barnes - guitar
- Bruce Howe - bass
- Ray Arnott - drums
- Steve Hill - keyboards
- Renée Geyer, Venetta Fields, Shauna Jenson - backing vocals
- Chris Stockley - mandolin
- Viv Riley, Barry Gray - bagpipe

== Charts ==
=== Weekly charts ===
Chart (1984–85)	Peak position
Australian Albums (Kent Music Report)	1
New Zealand Albums (RMNZ)	35

== Certifications ==
Region	Certification	Certified units/sales
Australia (ARIA)	2× Platinum	140,000^{^}
^{^} Shipments figures based on certification alone.

== See also ==
- List of number-one albums in Australia during the 1980s
