= Daylight (Jimmy Barnes song) =

1985 single by Jimmy Barnes

Single by Jimmy Barnes

from the album Bodyswerve
- B-side: "Paradise"; "Resurrection Shuffle (live)" (Limited edition side two only)
- Released: January 1985
- Studio: Rhinoceros Studios
- Label: Mushroom
- Songwriter(s): Jimmy Barnes
- Producer(s): Jimmy Barnes, Mark Opitz

Jimmy Barnes singles chronology
"Promise Me You'll Call" (1984)	"Daylight" (1985)	"I'd Die to Be with You Tonight" (1985)

Alternative cover
- Limited edition cover

"Daylight" is a song by Australian rock musician, Jimmy Barnes. Released in January 1985 as the third and final single from his debut studio album, Bodyswerve. The song peaked at number 12 on the Australian Kent Music Report. A limited edition of the single featuring the first live recording of the Jimmy Barnes band with the band's performance of "Resurrection Shuffle" (Recorded in December 1984) as the b-side of side two as well as a poster pack sold for 2.99 dollars.

Barnes originally wrote and recorded the song (then titled "A Little Bit of Daylight") while he was still with Cold Chisel. The Cold Chisel version (which is faster, and features a significantly different arrangement and different lyrics) remained unissued until the release of the band's post-split compilation Teenage Love in 1994.

Barnes' solo version—a much more "heavy rock" arrangement, featuring lead guitar by Mal Eastick and guest backing vocals by Renée Geyer—was included on Barnes' 1984 debut Australian solo album Bodyswerve, and was issued both as a two track single, and on a limited-edition four track "maxi single", with "Daylight and the studio track "Paradise" on the A-side and live versions of "Daylight" and "Resurrection Shuffle" on the B-side.

A remixed version of the song was subsequently included on Barnes' first internationally distributed LP For The Working Class Man (1985), which was issued in the USA on Geffen Records, and which featured a mixture of new recordings and remixed versions of tracks from Bodyswerve, including "Daylight".

== Track listing ==
7" Single (K 9582)

- Side A "Daylight"
- Side B "Paradise"
- Side C "Daylight" (Live)
- Side D "Paradise" (Live)

== Charts ==
Chart (1985)	Peak Position
Australia (Kent Music Report)	12
