= Promise Me You'll Call =

Single by Jimmy Barnes

from the album Bodyswerve
- Released: November 1984
- Studio: Rhinoceros Studios
- Label: Mushroom Records
- Songwriter(s): Jimmy Barnes
- Producer(s): Jimmy Barnes, Mark Opitz

Jimmy Barnes singles chronology
| "No Second Prize" (1984) | "Promise Me You'll Call" (1984) | "Daylight" (1985) |

"Promise Me You'll Call" is a song by Australian rock musician, Jimmy Barnes. Released in November 1984 as the second single from his debut studio album, Bodyswerve. The song peaked at number 86 on the Australian Kent Music Report.

== Track listing ==
7" Single (K 9538)

- Side A "Promise Me You'll Call"
- Side B "Boys Cry Out For War"

== Charts ==
| Chart (1984) | Peak Position |
|---|---|
| Australia (Kent Music Report) | 86 |
