= No Second Prize (song) =

Single by Jimmy Barnes

from the album Bodyswerve
- B-side: "I've Got News for You"
- Released: August 1984
- Studio: Rhinoceros Studios
- Length: 4:20
- Label: Mushroom Records
- Songwriter: Jimmy Barnes
- Producers: Jimmy Barnes, Mark Opitz

Jimmy Barnes singles chronology
"No Second Prize" (1984)	"Promise Me You'll Call" (1984)

"No Second Prize" is the debut single by Australian rock musician Jimmy Barnes, released in August 1984 as the lead single from his debut studio album, Bodyswerve. It peaked at number 12 on the Australian Kent Music Report. The song was originally demoed by Cold Chisel but never recorded by them. It was written in 1980 as a tribute to Chisel roadies Alan Dallow and Billy Rowe, who died in a truck crash.

At the 1984 Countdown Music Awards, Barnes won Best Male Performance in a Video.

== Track listing ==
7" Single (K 9468)

- Side A "No Second Prize" - 4:20
- Side B "I've Got News for You" - 3:04

12" /Maxi (X14109)

- Side A "No Second Prize" (Extended) - 5:55
- Side B1 "Piece of My Heart" - 4:07
- Side B2 "No Second Prize" - 4:21

== Charts ==
Chart (1984)	Peak Position
Australia (Kent Music Report)	12
Chart (1986)	Peak position
New Zealand (Recorded Music NZ)	49

== Certifications ==
Certifications for "No Second Prize"
Region	Certification	Certified units/sales
New Zealand (RMNZ)	Gold	15,000^{‡}
^{‡} Sales+streaming figures based on certification alone.
