= Jimmy Barnes discography =

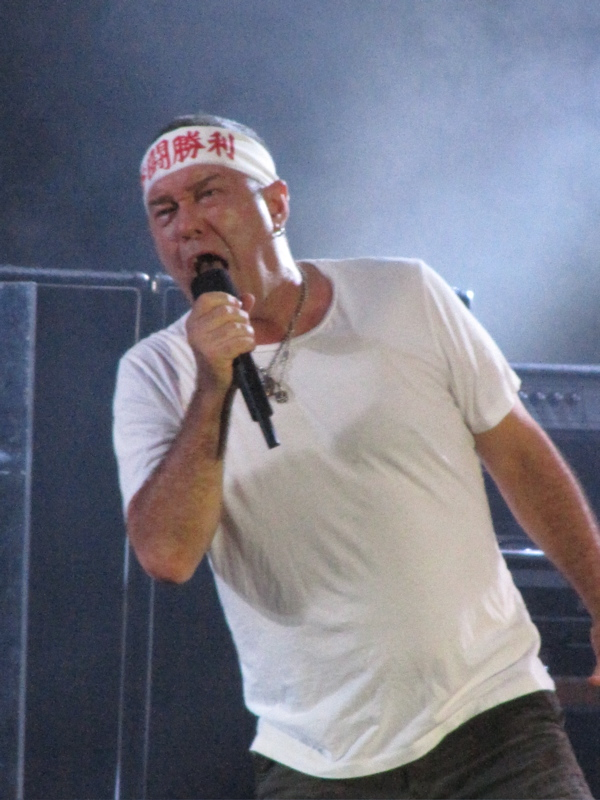
- Studio albums: 20
- Extended plays: 7
- Soundtrack albums: 1
- Live albums: 8
- Compilation albums: 3
- Singles: 77
- Video albums: 15
- Other albums: 3

This is a discography of the Scottish-born Australian rock singer Jimmy Barnes. As of 2019, Barnes has been certified with 48 platinum awards for his solo work and a further 20 platinum awards for his work with Cold Chisel.

Barnes holds the record with the most number-one albums in Australia, with 16.

== Albums ==
=== Studio albums ===
Title	Details	Peak chart positions						Certifications (sales thresholds)
Title	Details	AUS	NZ	SWE	US	CAN	UK	Certifications (sales thresholds)
Bodyswerve	Released: 10 September 1984; Label: Mushroom	1	35	—	—	—	—	AUS: 2× Platinum
For the Working Class Man	Released: 4 December 1985; Label: Mushroom	1	2	22	109	—	—	AUS: 7× Platinum; NZ: Platinum
Freight Train Heart	Released: 13 November 1987; Label: Mushroom	1	5	24	104	86	—	AUS: 5× Platinum; NZ: Platinum
Two Fires	Released: 7 September 1990; Label: Mushroom	1	1	—	—	—	—	AUS: 6× Platinum; NZ: Platinum
Soul Deep	Released: 8 November 1991; Label: Mushroom	1	3	—	—	—	—	AUS: 10× Platinum; NZ: 3× Platinum
Heat	Released: 26 March 1993; Label: Mushroom	2	3	50	—	—	—	AUS: Platinum; NZ: Gold
Flesh and Wood	Released: 17 December 1993; Label: Mushroom	2	9	—	—	—	—	AUS: 3× Platinum; NZ: Gold
Psyclone	Released: 30 June 1995; Label: Mushroom	2	38	—	—	—	125	AUS: Gold
Love and Fear	Released: 5 November 1999; Label: Mushroom	22	—	—	—	—	—	AUS: Gold
Soul Deeper... Songs from the Deep South	Released: 17 November 2000; Label: Liberation Music	3	15	—	—	—	—	AUS: Platinum; NZ: Gold
Double Happiness	Released: 18 July 2005; Label: Liberation Music	1	29	—	—	—	—	AUS: Platinum
Out in the Blue	Released: 24 November 2007; Label: Liberation Music	3	—	—	—	—	—	AUS: Platinum
The Rhythm and the Blues	Released: 28 August 2009; Label: Liberation Music	1	—	—	—	—	—	AUS: Platinum
Rage and Ruin	Released: 27 August 2010; Label: Liberation Music	3	20	—	—	—	—	AUS: Gold
30:30 Hindsight	Released: 29 August 2014; Label: Liberation Music	1	20	—	—	—	—	AUS: Platinum; RMNZ: Platinum
Soul Searchin'	Released: 3 June 2016; Label: Liberation Music	1	—	—	—	—	—	
Och Aye the G'nu (with The Wiggles)	Released: 31 March 2017; Label: ABC Music	34	—	—	—	—	—	
My Criminal Record	Released: 17 May 2019; Label: Bloodlines	1	3	—	—	—	—	
Flesh and Blood	Released: 2 July 2021; Label: Bloodlines	1	6	—	—	—	—	
Blue Christmas	Released: 25 November 2022; Label: Bloodlines	1	—	—	—	—	—	
Defiant	Released: 6 June 2025; Label: Mushroom	1	—	—	—	—	—	
"—" denotes a release that did not chart.

=== Soundtrack albums ===
Title	Detail	Peak chart positions
Title	Detail	AUS
Working Class Boy	Released: 17 August 2018; Label: Bloodlines	3

=== Reissued albums ===
Title	Detail	Peak chart positions
Title	Detail	AUS
Soul Deep 30	Released: 17 June 2022; Label: Bloodlines	1

=== Live albums ===
Titles	Details	Peak chart positions		Certifications (sales thresholds)
Titles	Details	AUS	NZ	Certifications (sales thresholds)
Barnestorming	Released: 1 December 1988; Label: Mushroom	1	1	AUS: 5× Platinum; NZ: Platinum
Raw	Released: 2 November 2001; Label: Thames/Thompson (334632); Format: CD, VHS, DVD	57	—	
Live (Unplugged) at the Chapel	Released: 2002; Label: Liberation Music (LIBCD 6089.2); Format: CD+DVD	—	—	
Soul Deeper – Live at the Basement	Released: 18 March 2003 [limited] / 2004; Label: Liberation Music (LIBCD 6091.2); Format: 2×CD	—	—	
Ride the Night Away – Live Shepherds Bush Empire 2001 (Europe only)	Released: 2003; Label: T2 Media (T2CD 0102); Format: 2×CD	—N/a	—N/a	
Live at the Sydney Opera House – Max Sessions	Released: 2007; Label: Liberation Music (LIBCD92652); Format: CD+DVD	—	—	
Live at the Enmore	Released: 13 February 2009; Label: Liberation Music (LMCD0061); Format: CD+DVD	—	—	
Modus Operandi	Released: 29 November 2019; Label: Bloodlines	48	—	
"—" denotes a release that did not chart.

=== Compilation albums ===
Title	Details	Peak chart positions		Certifications (sales thresholds)
Title	Details	AUS	NZ	Certifications (sales thresholds)
Barnes Hits Anthology (also known as Hits and The Best of... Anthology)	Released: 28 October 1996; Label: Mushroom Records	1	3	AUS: 6× Platinum; NZ: Platinum
In the Heat of the Night (New Zealand only release)	Released: 4 December 2006; Label: Liberation Music	—N/a	—	
Best of the Soul Years	Released: 14 August 2015; Label: Liberation Music	3	—	ARIA: Gold
"—" denotes a release that did not chart.

=== Box sets ===
Title	Details	Peak chart positions
Title	Details	AUS
The Soul Sessions	2×CD + DVD Soul Deep, Soul Deeper & Live at the Basement (DVD); Released: 25 August 2003; Label: Liberation Music	23
JB50	13×CD box set; Released: 28 April 2007; Label: Liberation Music; Limited to 5000 copies	147
Soul Searchin: 7in Singles Box	3x7" LPs; Released: 14 October 2016; Label: Liberation Music	—
"—" denotes a release that did not chart.

== Singles ==
Year	Title	Peak chart positions							Certifications	Album
Year	Title	AUS	NZ	US	US Rock	CAN	UK	IRE	Certifications	Album
1984	"No Second Prize"	12	49	—	41	—	—	—	RMNZ: Gold	Bodyswerve
1984	"Promise Me You'll Call"	86	—	—	—	—	—	—		Bodyswerve
1985	"Daylight"	12	—	—	—	—	—	—		Bodyswerve
1985	"I'd Die to Be with You Tonight"	7	16	—	—	—	—	—	RMNZ: Gold	For the Working Class Man
1985	"Working Class Man"	5	36	74	22	—	—	—	RMNZ: 3×Platinum	For the Working Class Man
1986	"Ride the Night Away"	39	—	—	—	—	—	—		For the Working Class Man
1986	"Good Times" (INXS & Jimmy Barnes)	2	1	47	3	74	18	23	RMNZ: Gold	The Lost Boys (soundtrack)
1987	"Too Much Ain't Enough Love"	1	4	91	3	—	—	—		Freight Train Heart
1988	"Driving Wheels"	12	19	—	38	—	—	—	RMNZ: Platinum	Freight Train Heart
1988	"I'm Still on Your Side"	29	50	—	—	—	—	—		Freight Train Heart
1988	"Waitin' for the Heartache"	33	—	—	—	—	—	—		Freight Train Heart
1988	"When a Man Loves a Woman" (live)	3	11	—	—	—	—	—	ARIA: Gold	Barnestorming
1989	"Last Frontier" (live)	31	—	—	—	—	—	—		Barnestorming
1990	"Lay Down Your Guns"	4	12	—	—	—	—	—	ARIA: Platinum	Two Fires
1990	"Let's Make It Last All Night"	12	—	—	—	—	—	—		Two Fires
1990	"Little Darling"	39	—	—	—	—	—	—		Two Fires
1991	"When Your Love Is Gone"	7	17	—	—	—	—	—	ARIA: Gold	Two Fires
1991	"Love Is Enough"	48	42	—	—	—	—	—		Two Fires
1991	"I Gotcha"	6	27	—	—	—	—	—	ARIA: Gold	Soul Deep
1991	"When Something Is Wrong with My Baby" (Jimmy Barnes & John Farnham)	3	6	—	—	—	—	—	ARIA: Platinum	Soul Deep
1992	"Ain't No Mountain High Enough"	28	45	—	—	—	—	—		Soul Deep
1992	"(Simply) The Best" (Tina Turner & Jimmy Barnes)	14	11	—	—	—	—	—	RMNZ: Gold	Simply the Best
1993	"Sweat It Out"	11	30	—	—	—	—	—		Heat
1993	"Stand Up"	41	—	—	—	—	—	—		Heat
1993	"Stone Cold"	4	14	—	—	—	—	—	ARIA: Platinum	Heat
1993	"Right by Your Side"	43	—	—	—	—	—	—		Heat
1993	"The Weight" (Jimmy Barnes & The Badloves)	6	41	—	—	—	—	—	ARIA: Gold	Flesh and Wood
1994	"You Can't Make Love Without a Soul"	84	—	—	—	—	—	—		Flesh and Wood
1994	"Still Got a Long Way to Go" (Jimmy Barnes & Diesel)	57	—	—	—	—	—	—		Flesh and Wood
1994	"It Will Be Alright"	129	—	—	—	—	—	—		Flesh and Wood
1995	"Change of Heart"	17	31	—	—	—	154	—		Psyclone
1995	"Come Undone" (solo or with The Pilgrims)	103	—	—	—	—	—	—		Psyclone
1995	"Every Beat"	128	—	—	—	—	—	—		Psyclone
1996	"Lover Lover"	6	13	—	—	—	—	—		Hits Anthology
1997	"Never Give You Up"/"Tear My Heart Out"/"(Your Love Keeps Lifting Me) Higher and Higher"	33	—	—	—	—	—	—		single only
1998	"Working Class Man (98)"	187	—	—	—	—	—	—		single only
1999	"Love and Hate"	70	—	—	—	—	—	—		Love and Fear
1999	"Thankful for the Rain"	63	—	—	—	—	—	—		Love and Fear
2000	"Chain of Fools"	15	—	—	—	—	—	—		Soul Deeper... Songs from the Deep South
2000	"Land of 1000 Dances" / "To Love Somebody"	—	—	—	—	—	—	—		Soul Deeper... Songs from the Deep South
2002	"Higher" (Jimmy Barnes & Gary Pinto)	80	—	—	—	—	—	—		Double Happiness
2005	"Sit on My Knee" (Jimmy Barnes & Dallas Crane)	14	—	—	—	—	—	—		Double Happiness
2005	"Gonna Take Some Time" (Jimmy Barnes & Mahalia Barnes)	31	—	—	—	—	—	—		Double Happiness
2006	"Bird on a Wire" (Jimmy Barnes & Troy Cassar-Daley & Bella)	59	—	—	—	—	—	—		Double Happiness
2006	"Out of Time" (Jimmy Barnes & Tim Rogers)	50	—	—	—	—	—	—		Double Happiness
2007	"Out in the Blue"	—	—	—	—	—	—	—		Out in the Blue
2007	"Better Off Alone"	—	—	—	—	—	—	—		Out in the Blue
2007	"Out in the Blue" (live)	—	—	—	—	—	—	—		Live at the Sydney Opera House – Max Sessions
2008	"Blue Hotel"	—	—	—	—	—	—	—		Out in the Blue
2008	"I Can't Tell You Why"	—	—	—	—	—	—	—		Out in the Blue
2008	"You've Lost That Lovin' Feelin'" (David Campbell & Jimmy Barnes)	— (Note: "You've Lost That Lovin' Feelin'" did not enter the ARIA Top 100, but peaked at number 32 on the ARIA physical sales)	—	—	—	—	—	—		Good Lovin'
2009	"Red Hot" / "A Fool in Love"	159	—	—	—	—	—	—		The Rhythm and the Blues
2010	"That's How It Is (When You're in Love)"	—	—	—	—	—	—	—		The Rhythm and the Blues
2010	"Before the Devil Knows You're Dead"	—	—	—	—	—	—	—		Rage and Ruin
2010	"God or Money"	—	—	—	—	—	—	—		Rage and Ruin
2011	"Largs Pier Hotel"	—	—	—	—	—	—	—		Rage and Ruin
2014	"Lay Down Your Guns" (featuring The Living End)	—	—	—	—	—	—	—		30:30 Hindsight
2014	"I'd Die to Be with You Tonight" (featuring Diesel)	93	—	—	—	—	—	—		30:30 Hindsight
2016	"Who Was I Foolin'?" (with Lachy Doley)	—	—	—	—	—	—	—		Lovelight
2017	"Big Enough" (Kirin J. Callinan featuring Alex Cameron, Molly Lewis & Jimmy Barnes)	—	—	—	—	—	—	—		Bravado
2019	"My Criminal Record"	—	—	—	—	—	—	—		My Criminal Record
2019	"Shutting Down Our Town"	— (Note: "Shutting Down Our Town" did not enter the ARIA Singles Chart, but peaked at number 35 on the ARIA Digital Track Chart.)	—	—	—	—	—	—	ARIA: Gold	My Criminal Record
2019	"I Won't Let You Down"	—	—	—	—	—	—	—		My Criminal Record
2020	"Killing Time" (with Australian Chamber Orchestra)	—	—	—	—	—	—	—		Non-album singles
2020	"Silent Night"	—	—	—	—	—	—	—		Non-album singles
2021	"Flesh and Blood"	—	—	—	—	—	—	—		Flesh and Blood
2021	"You Ain't Goin' Nowhere" (with Paul Field)	—	—	—	—	—	—	—		Loves Songs for Lonely People
2021	"'Til the Next Time"	—	—	—	—	—	—	—		Flesh and Blood
2021	"Gateway to Your Heart"	—	—	—	—	—	—	—		Flesh and Blood
2021	"Around in Circles"	—	—	—	—	—	—	—		Flesh and Blood
2022	"Soothe Me" (featuring Sam Moore)	—	—	—	—	—	—	—		Soul Deep 30
2022	"Do You Love Me" (With Josh Teskey)	—	—	—	—	—	—	—		Soul Deep 30
2022	"Blue Christmas"	—	—	—	—	—	—	—		Blue Christmas
2023	"If Santa Forgets" (with The Tin Lids)	—	—	—	—	—	—	—		Blue Christmas (Expanded edition)
2023	"Black and Blue" (with Joe Bonamassa)	—	—	—	—	—	—	—		Mushroom: Fifty Years of Making Noise (Reimagined)
2024	"Comin' Up" (with Y.O.G.A.)	—	—	—	—	—	—	—		
2025	"New Day" / "Beyond the River Bend"	—	—	—	—	—	—	—		Defiant
2025	"The Long Road"	—	—	—	—	—	—	—		Defiant
2025	"Defiant"	—	—	—	—	—	—	—		Defiant
2025	"That's What You Do for Love"	—	—	—	—	—	—	—		Defiant
2025	"Brother of Mine" (with Swanee and Alan Barnes)	—	—	—	—	—	—	—		Believe
2026	"Rock 'n' Roll Is King"	—	—	—	—	—	—	—		
"—" denotes a release that did not chart or was not issued in that region.

== Promotional releases ==
Year	Title	Notes
1993	"Gonna See My Baby Tonight" (Jimmy Barnes & Nathan Cavaleri)	In September 1993 Cavaleri and Barnes released a cover version of the La De Da's' single, "Gonna See My Baby Tonight". Fifty thousand promotional copies were included as give-aways in Uncle Tobys breakfast cereal boxes.
2001	"Good Times" (live) / "Ride the Night Away" (live) (Jimmy Barnes & Bon Jovi)	Recorded live on 24 March 2001 at Colonial Stadium in Melbourne, Australia and sold online via Barnes website.
2017	"High Voltage (Tribute to George and Malcolm Young)" (live)	Recorded live at the 2017 ARIA Awards. Released digitally
2026	"In the Air Tonight" (Like a Version) (Onefour featuring Jimmy Barnes and Jessica Mauboy	For Like a Version

== Other albums ==
Year	Title
1995	Euro Summer '94: UK promo-release only; Released: 1995; Label: Mushroom Records
2003	Live at the Basement: Jon Lord with Hoochie Coochie Men & Jimmy Barnes; Released: 2003; Label: EMI
2004	Living Loud: as part of Living Loud; Released: 22 June 2004; Label: Capitol Records
2006	Live at Lizottes: iTunes-only release; Released: 1 July 2006; Label: Liberation Music
2008	Live: as part of Living Loud; Released: 29 August 2008; Label: Edel Records
2013	Welcome to the Pleasure House: 6-track EP; Released: 16 August 2013; Label: Freight Train Studio
2021	Skin and Bone (The Flesh and Blood Demos) (featuring Diesel): 6-track demo EP; Released: 15 October 2021; Label: Bloodlines

== Videos and DVDs ==
Title	Detail	Peak chart positions	Certification
Title	Detail	AUS	Certification
Take One – The Videos	Released: 1989; Label: Mushroom (81009)	—N/a	ARIA: Platinum
Take Two – The Videos	Released: 1991; Label: Mushroom (V82375)	—N/a	
Soul Deep – Live at the Palais	Released: 1992; Label: Mushroom (V82451)	—N/a	
Flesh and Wood	Released: 1994; Label: Mushroom (74321 21761 3)	—N/a	
Barnes Hits – Video Anthology	Released: 1996; Label: Mushroom (V81632)	29 (Note: Barnes Hits – Video Anthology entered the chart in 2003)	ARIA: Platinum
Soul Deeper – Live at the Basement	Released: 2001; Label: Liberation Music (LIBDVD1016)		ARIA: Platinum
Raw / Live in Australia	Released: November 2001; Label: Festival (334638)	5	
Unplugged: Live at the Chapel	Released: 2002; Label: Thames/Thompson (TMM0021)		
Hits	Released: 2004; Label: Liberation Music (LIBDVD1027)		ARIA: Platinum
Hits +	Released: 2004; Label: Liberation Music		ARIA: Platinum
Concert Box	Released: 2004; Label: Liberation Music (BARNESDVD1); Note: 3x DVD (Soul Deep – Live at the Palais / Live at the Chapel / Soul Deeper – Live at the Basement)		
Max Sessions: Live at the Sydney Opera House	Released: November 2007; Label: Liberation Music (LIBDVD 1085)	11	ARIA: Gold
Live at the Enmore	Released: July 2009; Label: Liberation Music (LIBDVD1093)	12	ARIA: Gold
30 Years of Jimmy Barnes – The Rockumentary	Released: 2015; Label: Liberation Music		

=== Other appearances ===
List of other non-single song appearances
Title	Year	Album
"Laying Down the Law" (with INXS)	1987	The Lost Boys (soundtrack)
"If Santa Forgets"" (with Tin Lids)	1991	Hey Rudolph!
"Working Class Man"	1993	Triple M Cordless
"Catch Your Shadow"	1993	Triple M Cordless
"The Toilet"	1995	I Can Do That!
"Merry Christmas Everybody"	1995	The Spirit of Christmas 1995
"Rain" (live)	1998	Good Vibrations – A Concert for Marc Hunter – The Live Event
"Working Class Man" (live)	1998	Mushroom 25 Live
"Lover Lover" (live)	1998	Mushroom 25 Live
"The Loved One" (live) (with INXS)	1998	Mushroom 25 Live
"Good Times" (live) (with INXS)	1998	Mushroom 25 Live
"Happy Christmas (War Is Over)"	1998	The Spirit of Christmas 1998
"Good Time Tonight" (with Bon Jovi)	2001	Crush Down Under
"Ride the Night Away" (with Bon Jovi)	2001	Crush Down Under
"Dancing Queen"	2001	Andrew Denton's Musical Challenge
"When Something Is Wrong with My Baby" (live)	2001	A Night Out... Live at the Basement
"I Put a Spell on You" (live)	2002	Live at the Basement Vol. 2
"I'd Die To Be With You Tonight" (live)	2002	Cold Live at the Chapel 3
"Flame Trees" (live)	2002	Cold Live at the Chapel 3
"When a Blind Man Cries" (with Jon Jord)	2003	The Spirit of Christmas Vol. 1 2003
"What a Wonderful World"	2005	The Spirit of Christmas 2005
"Gonna Take Some Time" (with Mahalia Barnes)	2006	RocKwiz Duets
"River Deep Mountain High" (live)	2007	Rock the Millennium (Note: Recorded in Sydney on 31 December 1999, released in 2007 on CD and DVD)
"Working Class Man" (live)	2007	Rock the Millennium
"Heart of Stone" (with The Hoochie Coochie Men and Jon Lord)	2007	Danger. White Men Dancing
"The Hoochie Coochie Man" (with The Hoochie Coochie Men and Jon Lord)	2007	Danger. White Men Dancing
"Silent Night" (with The Choir of Hard Knocks)	2007	The Spirit of Christmas 2007
"Monkey Man" (live) (with Glenn Hughes)	2008	Music for the Divine
"Everything Love Is" (with Olivia Newton-John)	2008	A Celebration in Song
"Motherfigure" (with Stevie Wright)	2008	Easy Fever – A Tribute to The Easybeats and Stevie Wright
"Hurt"	2008	Caution: Life Ahead
"Out in the Blue" (live)	2008	A Day on the Green (The Vintage Years 2001-2008)
"You Make Me Feel Brand New" (with Tex Perkins)	2008	No.1's and No.2's
"What Becomes of the Brokenhearted" (with Ian Moss)	2009	Soul on West 53rd
"Blue Hotel" (live)	2010	A Day on the Green – Celebrating 10 Years
"Shake Rattle and Roll" (live)	2010	Byron Bay Bluesfest 2010
"Bird on a Wire" (live) (with Troy Cassar-Daley	2010	Troy Cassar-Daley Live
"Message to My Girl"	2010	He Will Have His Way – The Songs of Tim & Neil Finn
"Have Love, Will Travel" (with Diesel)	2011	Under the Influence
"Never Give You Up"	2011	Floodlight – Barnes Family Songs for Flood Relief
"When Two Hearts Collide" (with Kasey Chambers)	2011	Floodlight – Barnes Family Songs for Flood Relief
"I've Seen It All"	2011	Floodlight – Barnes Family Songs for Flood Relief
"Around the World" (with David Campbell and Mahalia Barnes)	2011	Floodlight – Barnes Family Songs for Flood Relief
"Love Me Tender" (with David Campbell and Mahalia Barnes)	2011	Floodlight – Barnes Family Songs for Flood Relief
"If I Needed You" (with Kasey Chambers)	2011	Storybook
"Too Much Ain't Enough Love" (with Joe Bonamassa)	2012	Driving Towards the Daylight
"Lazy" (with Joe Bonamassa)	2012	Re-Machined a Tribute to Deep Purple's Machine Head
"Ain't That a Shame" (with Lil' Band o' Gold)	2012	Play Fats
"Please Come Home for Christmas"	2013	The Spirit of Christmas 2013
"Two Weeks On, Two Weeks Off" (with Troy Cassar-Daley)	2015	Freedom Ride
"Empty Heart" (with The Dead Daisies)	2015	Revolución
"Itchy Fingers (Jimmy's Sea Shanty)" (with The Wiggles)	2017	The Wiggles Duets
"When You're Ready" (with Tina Arena)	2017	Greatest Hits & Interpretations
"Who Was I Foolin'?" (with The Lachy Doley Group and Nathan Cavaleri)	2017	Lovelight
"Ring of Fire" (with Johnny Kannis)	2017	Cover to Cover
"Edge of Reality" (with The Hitmen)	2017	Solid as a Rock: The Best of
"Khe Sahn" (live)	2018	Countdown: Live at The Sydney Opera House
"Flame Trees" (live)	2018	Countdown: Live at The Sydney Opera House
"Working Class Man" (live)	2018	Countdown: Live at The Sydney Opera House
"Good Times" (live) (with Mahalia Barnes)	2018	Countdown: Live at The Sydney Opera House
"Ride the Nite Away" (live) (with Little Steven & The Disciples of Soul	2019	Summer of Sorcery Live! At The Beacon Theatre
"Sun City" (live) (with Little Steven & The Disciples of Soul and Peter Garrett	2019	Summer of Sorcery Live! At The Beacon Theatre
"Working Class Man" (with Diesel)	2020	Music from the Home Front
"After it's Over" (with Gölä)	2020	Hour of the Thief
"Black Bess" (with Kasey Chambers)	2020	Cannot Buy My Soul: The Songs of Kev Carmody
"Gotcha Money on Yr Mind" (with Davie Lane)	2020	'Don't Bank Your Heart on It
"Brother of Mine" (with Swanee and Alan Barnes)	2025	Believe
"Dark End of the Street" (with Swanee)	2025	Believe
"Love Song" (with John Rooney and Ruby Rodgers)	2026	Cradle Rock: Songs for Little Lives
