= Barnes Hits Anthology =

Greatest hits album by Jimmy Barnes
- Released: October 1996
- Genre: Rock
- Length: 1:19:08 (Single Disc)
- Language: English
- Label: (Australia) Mushroom Records

Jimmy Barnes chronology
Psyclone (1995)	Barnes Hits Anthology (1996)	Love and Fear (1999)

Singles from Barnes Hits Anthology
- 1. "Lover Lover" Released: September 1996

Professional ratings
Review scores
Source	Rating
AllMusic	4.5/5 stars

Barnes Hits Anthology (also known as The Best Of... Anthology or simply Hits) is the first greatest hits album by Australian rock musician, Jimmy Barnes. It debuted at number 1 in Australia and number 3 in New Zealand.

It was nominated for Highest Selling Album at the ARIA Music Awards of 1997, but lost to Recurring Dream by Crowded House.

The album was released on vinyl for the first time in November 2018.

== Track listing ==
No.	Title	Writer(s)	Originally from	Length
1.	"Driving Wheels"	Jimmy Barnes, Jonathan Cain, David Roberts	Freight Train Heart (1987)	5:17
2.	"Stone Cold"	Don Walker	Heat (1993)	3:47
3.	"Lover Lover"	Jimmy Barnes, Jane Barnes	Barnes Hits Anthology (1996)	3:30
4.	"Too Much Ain't Enough Love"	Jimmy Barnes, Jonathan Cain, Neal Schon, Randy Jackson, Tony Brock	Freight Train Heart (1987)	3:43
5.	"I'd Die to Be with You Tonight"	Chas Sandford	For the Working Class Man (1985)	3:53
6.	"Little Darling"	Jimmy Barnes	Two Fires (1990)	4:16
7.	"Ride the Night Away"	Steven Van Zandt, Steve Jordan	For the Working Class Man (1985)	4:06
8.	"Good Times" (with INXS)	Harry Vanda, George Young	The Lost Boys (1987)	3:53
9.	"When Something Is Wrong with My Baby" (with John Farnham)	David Porter, Isaac Hayes	Soul Deep (1991)	4:56
10.	"Change of Heart"	Jimmy Barnes, Jeff Neill, Michael Hegarty, Guy Davies	Psyclone (1995)	4:02
11.	"Working Class Man"	Jonathan Cain	For the Working Class Man (1985)	3:48
12.	"No Second Prize"	Jimmy Barnes	Bodyswerve (1984)	3:59
13.	"Lay Down Your Guns"	Jimmy Barnes, Rick Nowels	Two Fires (1990)	4:00
14.	"(Simply) The Best" (with Tina Turner)	Holly Knight, Mike Chapman	Simply the Best (1991)	4:11
15.	"When Your Love is Gone"	Jimmy Barnes, Kevin Savigar, Tony Brock	Two Fires (1990)	5:14
16.	"Stand Up"	Jimmy Barnes, Jeff Neill	Heat (1993)	3:58
17.	"I'm Still on Your Side"	Jimmy Barnes, Jonathan Cain, Jim Vallance	Freight Train Heart (1987)	3:54
18.	"The Weight" (with The Badloves)	Robbie Robertson	Flesh and Wood (1993)	4:27
19.	"Let's Make It Last All Night"	Jimmy Barnes, Desmond Child, Diane Warren	Two Fires (1990)	4:05
Total length:				1:19:08

Double disc edition

1. "Different Lives"
2. "No Second Prize" (1996 version)
3. "Edgewood"
4. "Love Will Find a Way" (Rough Mix)
5. "No Frills"
6. "Tear My Heart Out"
7. "Going to Mexico"
8. "Bad News"
9. "The Other Side"
10. "Destiny"
11. "Seven Days" (12" Mix)
12. "Sydney Ladies"
13. "Black and Blue"
14. "Gonna See My Baby Tonight" (with Nathan Cavaleri)
15. "I Gotcha" (Tex Mex Remix)
16. "Every Beat" (Dark Reggae 12" Mix)
17. "White Room"

== Charts ==
Hits was Barnes' seventh number 1 album in Australia.

=== Weekly charts ===
Chart (1996)	Peak position
Australian Albums (ARIA)	1
New Zealand Albums (RMNZ)	3

=== Year-end charts ===
Chart (1996)	Position
ARIA Albums Chart	12
ARIA Australian Artists Albums Chart	3

== Certifications ==
Region	Certification	Certified units/sales
Australia (ARIA)	6× Platinum	420,000^{^}
New Zealand (RMNZ)	Platinum	15,000^{^}
^{^} Shipments figures based on certification alone.

== See also ==
- List of number-one albums in Australia during the 1990s
