= Barnestorming =

Live album by Jimmy Barnes
- Released: November 1988
- Recorded: December 1987 – February 1988
- Venue: Melbourne
- Genre: Hard rock
- Length: 73:38
- Label: Mushroom

Jimmy Barnes chronology
| Freight Train Heart (1987) | Barnestorming (1988) | Two Fires (1990) |

Singles from Barnestorming
- 1. "When a Man Loves a Woman" Released: November 1988; 2. "Last Frontier" Released: January 1989

Professional ratings
Review scores
| Source | Rating |
|---|---|
| Kerrang! | 4.5/5 stars |

Barnestorming or Barnestorming Live is the first live album by Australian hard rocker, Jimmy Barnes, the former lead vocalist for Cold Chisel. It was released in November 1988 and went to number one on the Australian albums chart for three weeks later that month. Barnes and his backing band were recorded at their Melbourne performances from December 1987 to February 1988.

== Background ==
Australian hard rocker, Jimmy Barnes (ex-Cold Chisel), released Barnestorming in November 1988, a year after the related concert performances in Melbourne had started. At that time, Barnes third solo album, Freight Train Heart (December 1987), had just been released and was his third number-one album on the Australian Albums Chart in a row.

To support its appearance he started the Barnestorming Tour with the line-up of Barnes on lead vocals and guitar, his brother-in-law, Johnny Diesel, on guitar, Dave Amato on guitar, Chris Bailey on bass guitar, Tony Brock on drums and Peter Kekell on keyboards.

It appeared on the Mushroom Records label as a 2× LP album, on CD and on 2× audio cassettes in Australia. The live recordings were mixed by Dave Thoener at Rhinoceros Studios, Sydney, in September 1988.

== Track listing ==
1. "Driving Wheels" (Jimmy Barnes, Jonathan Cain, David Roberts)
2. "Good Times" (Harry Vanda, George Young)
3. "Too Much Ain't Enough Love" (Barnes, Cain, Tony Brock, Neal Schon, Randy Jackson)
4. "Lessons in Love" (Barnes, Jim Vallance, Jeff Neill, Cain)
5. "Working Class Man" (Cain)
6. "Waitin' for the Heartache" (Barnes, Desmond Child)
7. "Do or Die" (Barnes, Cain)
8. "When a Man Loves a Woman" (Calvin Lewis, Andrew Wright)
9. "Last Frontier" (Barnes, Cain)
10. "Seven Days" (Bob Dylan)
11. "Temptation" (Barnes)
12. "No Second Prize" (Barnes)
13. "Walk On" (Child, Joe Lynn Turner)
14. "Rising Sun" (Barnes)
15. "Without Your Love" (Barnes, Tony Carey)
16. "Paradise" (Barnes)

== Personnel ==
Musicians

- Jimmy Barnes – vocals, guitar
- Johnny Diesel, Dave Amato – guitar
- Chris Bailey – bass
- Tony Brock – drums
- Peter Kekell – keyboards

Production work

- Mastering engineer – Rick O'Neil at Festival records, Sydney, Australia
- Mixer – Dave Thoener at Rhinoceros Studios, Sydney, September 1988
  - Assistant mixer – Paula Jones

== Charts ==
=== Weekly charts ===
| Chart (1988–1989) | Peak position |
|---|---|
| Australian Albums (ARIA) | 1 |
| New Zealand Albums (RMNZ) | 1 |

=== Year-end charts ===
| Chart (1989) | Position |
|---|---|
| Australian Albums (ARIA) | 38 |
| New Zealand Albums (RMNZ) | 31 |

== Certifications ==
| Region | Certification | Certified units/sales |
|---|---|---|
| Australia (ARIA) | 5× Platinum | 350,000^{^} |
| New Zealand (RMNZ) | Platinum | 15,000^{^} |
^{^} Shipments figures based on certification alone.

== See also ==
- List of number-one albums in Australia during the 1980s
