= Right by Your Side =

Right by Your Side may refer to:

- Right by Your Side (Eurythmics song)
- Right by Your Side (Jimmy Barnes song)
- Right by Your Side (N-Force and Darren Styles song)
- "Right by Your Side", a 2011 song by James Morrison from The Awakening
