= Twenty Four Seven (Dallas Crane album) =

Studio album by Dallas Crane
- Released: 17 October 2000
- Recorded: Tiger Sound Studios
- Genre: Rock, Aussie rock
- Length: 32:44
- Label: Albert Productions

Dallas Crane chronology
Lent (1998)	Twenty Four Seven (2000)	Dallas Crane (2004)

Twenty Four Seven is the second album by aussie rock band Dallas Crane, released in October 2000.

== Track listing ==
1. Sit On My Knee - 2:44
2. Sweet FA
3. Sold Me
4. Already Gone
5. Naked
6. Lay Down
7. Shit Creek
8. Nowhere
9. Some Days
10. Come Again
11. Home
