= Lent (album) =

Studio album by Dallas Crane
- Released: 1998
- Genre: Rock
- Label: Independent

Dallas Crane chronology
Lent (1998)	Twenty Four Seven (2001)

Lent is the first album by Dallas Crane, released in 1998.

== Track listing ==
1. Nylon Don't Breath
2. A Romantic Comedy
3. Suppose I'm a Catholic
4. Jonco
5. Mr. Meddle
6. Days of the Wild
7. T.V.
8. Trenchcoat De Ville
9. Cyclone
10. January
