= Dallas Crane (album) =

Studio album by Dallas Crane
- Released: 10 July 2004
- Recorded: Alberts' Tiger Studios
- Genre: Alternative rock
- Length: 49:33
- Label: Albert Productions
- Producer: Wayne Connolly

Dallas Crane chronology
Twenty Four Seven (2001)	Dallas Crane (2004)	Factory Girls (2006)

Singles from Dallas Crane
- 1. "Ladybird" Released: 2003; 2. "Dirty Hearts" Released: 2004; 3. "Numb All Over" Released: 2004

Dallas Crane is the third studio album by Australian rock band Dallas Crane. It was released in 2004 and was nominated for the ARIA Music Awards in the Best Rock Album category. It had a favorable critical reception, rated four stars by both The Age, which described it as sounding "like it was knocked off live over a boozy weekend", and the Sunday Herald Sun, which rated it "one of the most impressive rock albums of the past decade ... rivalling Face to Face, Big Bad Noise and Jaws of Life in the realm of Aussie classics". It earned 3½ stars from The Herald Sun and 7/10 by the Sun-Herald. It was ranked No.2 on a Sunday Herald Sun list of the best albums of 2004.

== Track listing ==
(All songs by Dallas Crane)

1. "Dirty Hearts" - 2:29
2. "Iodine" - 2:46
3. "Can't Work You Out" - 3:05
4. "Unlucky Star" - 2:53
5. "Open To Close" - 4:01
6. "Wrong Party" - 4:15
7. "Come Clean" - 7:30
8. "Numb All Over" - 3:05
9. "Under The Moon" - 2:13
10. "Wannabe" - 3:42
11. "Out In Space" - 2:37
12. "Ladybird" - 2:34
13. "Come and Go" - 3:55
14. "Alright By Me" - 4:34

== Personnel ==
- Pete Satchell - vocals, lead guitar
- Dave Larkin - vocals, rhythm guitar
- Shannon Vanderwert - drums, vocals
- Pat Bourke - bass guitar

== Charts ==
Chart (2004/05)	Peak position
Australian Albums (ARIA Charts)	49
