= Stand Up (Jimmy Barnes song) =

1993 single by Jimmy Barnes

Single by Jimmy Barnes

from the album Heat
- B-side: "Lay Down Your Guns", "Little Darling"
- Released: 28 February 1993
- Length: 4:10
- Label: Mushroom
- Songwriter(s): Jimmy Barnes, Jeff Neill
- Producer(s): Don Gehman

Jimmy Barnes singles chronology
"Sweat It Out" (1993)	"Stand Up" (1993)	"Stone Cold" (1993)

"Stand Up" is a song written by Australian rock musicians Jimmy Barnes and Jeff Neill. It was released by Barnes in February 1993 as the second single from his sixth studio album, Heat. The song peaked at number 41 on the Australian Singles Chart.

== Track listing ==
CD single

1. "Stand Up" – 4:10
2. "Lay Down Your Guns" – 4:00
3. "Little Darling" – 4:33

== Charts ==
Chart (1993)	Peak position
Australia (ARIA)	41
