= Factory Girls (album) =

Studio album by Dallas Crane
- Released: September 16, 2006
- Recorded: Eastern Bloc Studios
- Genre: Alternative rock
- Length: 38 mins
- Label: Albert Productions
- Producers: Jonathan Burnside, Wayne Connolly

Dallas Crane chronology
Dallas Crane (2004)	Factory Girls (2006)

Professional ratings
Review scores
Source	Rating
The Age	(not rated)

Factory Girls is the fourth album from Melbourne rock band Dallas Crane, released on September 16, 2006. All the tracks were written and performed by Dallas Crane, with Steve Hesketh on keyboards for "Teenage Superpot" and "Muddy Waters".

== Track listing ==
1. "Tonight (There's A Party Going Down)" 2:46
2. "Marsanne (Love Awaits You)" 3:00
3. "Lovers & Sinners" 3:23
4. "God Damn Pride" 3:17
5. "Kiss It All Goodbye" 2:49
6. "Curiosity" 3:21
7. "Black Angels" 3:17
8. "Teenage Superpot" 2:34
9. "Matter of Time" 3:18
10. "Two Can Play at This Game" 2:49
11. "Muddy Water" 4:07
12. "Keep Your Head High Bella Mae" 3:11

== 2 CD Edition ==
A Limited 2 Disc Edition of the CD was released the same day as the regular album, with Disc 2 comprising the following track listing:

1. "Colour The Black Of My Heart" 2:54
2. "Sweet Comedown" 3:34
3. "She's An Angel" 2:37
4. "Tonight! (There's A Party Going Down) - Live" 2:51
5. "Ladybird (Video)"
6. "Curiosity (Video)"

== Charts ==
Chart (2006)	Peak position
Australian Albums (ARIA Charts)	30
