= Gonna Take Some Time =

Single by Jimmy Barnes with Mahalia Barnes

from the album Double Happiness
- Released: October 2005
- Recorded: 2005
- Studio: Freight Train Studios, Sydney
- Length: 4:18
- Label: Liberation Records
- Songwriters: Jade MacRae; Mahalia Barnes
- Producer: Mark Lizotte

Jimmy Barnes singles chronology
"Sit on My Knee" (2005)	"Gonna Take Some Time" (2005)	"Bird on the Wire" (2006)

"Gonna Take Some Time" is a duet recorded by Australian singers, Jimmy Barnes and his daughter, Mahalia Barnes. It was released in October 2005 as the third single from Jimmy's eleventh studio album, Double Happiness (July 2005). It was co-written by former bandmates, Mahalia and Jade MacRae. "Gonna Take Some Time" peaked at number 31 on the ARIA singles chart.

== Track listing ==
CD single Liberation Records (LIBSP71865)

1. "Gonna Take Some Time" (by Jimmy Barnes with Mahalia Barnes) - 4:18
2. "Hey Now" (by Mahalia Barnes) - 3:56
3. "Gonna Take Some Time" (Acoustic Version) (by Jimmy Barnes with Mahalia Barnes) - 4:18

DVD single

1. "Gonna Take Some Time" (music video)
2. "Sit on My Knee" (music video) (by Jimmy Barnes / Dallas Crane)

== Charts ==
Chart (2005)	Peak position
Australia (ARIA)	31
