= Lover Lover =

Single by Jimmy Barnes

from the album Barnes Hits Anthology
- B-side: "Tear My Heart Out"
- Released: September 1996
- Genre: Pop, rock
- Length: 3:31
- Label: Mushroom Records
- Songwriters: Jane Barnes, Jimmy Barnes
- Producers: Carl Carlton, Bertram Engel, Jimmy Barnes

Jimmy Barnes singles chronology
"Come Undone" (1996)	"Lover Lover" (1996)	"Never Give You Up" (1997)

"Lover Lover" is a song by Australian rock musician, Jimmy Barnes. Released in September 1996 as the lead single from his Barnes Hits Anthology (1996). The song was written by his wife, Jane. The song peaked at number 6 on the Australian ARIA Singles Chart.

== Track listing ==
CD Single

1. "Lover Lover" - 3:31

== Charts ==
=== Weekly charts ===
Chart (1996)	Peak position
Australia (ARIA)	6
New Zealand (Recorded Music NZ)	13

=== Year-end charts ===
Chart (1996)	Position
Australian Singles Chart	74
