= Psyclone (album) =

Studio album by Jimmy Barnes
- Released: 12 June 1995
- Genre: Rock
- Length: 59:27
- Label: Mushroom
- Producer: Jimmy Barnes and Joe Hardy

Jimmy Barnes chronology
Flesh and Wood (1993)	Psyclone (1995)	Barnes Hits Anthology (1996)

Singles from Psyclone
- 1. "Change of Heart" Released: 1 May 1995; 2. "Come Undone" Released: 14 August 1995; 3. "Every Beat" Released: 6 November 1995

Psyclone is the eighth studio album for Australian rock singer Jimmy Barnes. It was released in Australia by Mushroom Records on 12 June 1995 and peaked at number two on the ARIA Albums Chart.

Barnes said in 2010: "When I made Psyclone, I was at the height of my alcoholism and addiction. I was literally staring into the abyss".

== Track listing ==
1. "Used to the Truth" (Jimmy Barnes, Guy Davies, Jeff Neill, Michael Hegerty) – 4:24
2. "Spend the Night" (Jimmy Barnes, Guy Davies, Jeff Neill, Michael Hegerty) – 3:52
3. "Change of Heart (Jimmy Barnes, Guy Davies, Jeff Neill, Michael Hegarty) – 5:08
4. "Every Beat" (Jimmy Barnes, Jackie Barnes, Jeff Neill) – 4:35
5. "Come Undone" (Jimmy Barnes, Diesel) – 4:55
6. "Stumbling" (Jimmy Barnes, Jeff Neill, Guy Davies, Michael Hegerty, Neil Martin) – 4:03
7. "Love and Devotion" (Jimmy Barnes, Jackie Barnes, Diesel, Guy Davies) – 4:39
8. "Mirror of Your Soul" (Jimmy Barnes, Guy Davies)– 5:39
9. "Just a Man" (Jimmy Barnes, Jeff Neill) – 3:56
10. "Fooling Yourself" (Jimmy Barnes, Jeff Neill) – 4:26
11. "Tears" (Jimmy Barnes, Guy Davies) - 4:50
12. "Going Down Alone" (Jimmy Barnes, Guy Davies, Jeff Neill, Michael Hegerty) – 5:08
13. "Because You Wanted It" (Jimmy Barnes) – 3:53

== Credits ==
- Jimmy Barnes – vocals and producer
- Joe Hardy – producer and engineer
- Musicians - Jeff Neill, Michael Hegerty, Guy Davies, Neil Martin, Jimmy Barnes, Diesel, Tony Brock
- Strings - Stephanie Perin, Olivier Lechardeur, Viviane Abdekmalcek, Nicolas Galiere
- Backup Vocals – Lisa Hunt, Monica Reed-Price

== Charts ==
Chart performance for Psyclone
Chart (1995)	Peak position
Australian Albums (ARIA)	2
New Zealand Albums (RMNZ)	38
UK Albums (OCC)	125

== Certifications ==
Certifications for Psyclone
Region	Certification	Certified units/sales
Australia (ARIA)	Platinum	70,000^{^}
^{^} Shipments figures based on certification alone.
