= Flesh and Wood =

1993 studio album by Jimmy Barnes

Studio album by Jimmy Barnes
- Released: 6 December 1993
- Studio: Freight Train (Bowral, Australia)
- Genre: Rock
- Length: 55:36
- Label: Mushroom
- Producer: Don Gehman, Jimmy Barnes

Jimmy Barnes chronology
Heat (1993)	Flesh and Wood (1993)	Psyclone (1995)

Singles from Flesh and Wood
- 1. "The Weight" Released: 8 November 1993; 2. "You Can't Make Love Without a Soul" Released: 31 January 1994; 3. "Still Got a Long Way to Go" Released: 9 May 1994; 4. "It Will Be Alright" Released: 8 August 1994

Flesh and Wood is the seventh album by Australian rock singer Jimmy Barnes, which was issued in December 1993. It was recorded by Barnes and Don Gehman co-producing and used only acoustic instruments. On eight of its fifteen tracks, Barnes duets with various artists: Diesel, Archie Roach, Joe Cocker, Ross Wilson, Tommy Emmanuel, Don Walker, Deborah Conway, and the Badloves. It reached No. 2 on the ARIA Albums Chart.

== Background ==
In 1993 Jimmy Barnes gathered a few colleagues including his guitar player Canadian Jeff Neill and Australian Country Music musician Lawrie Minson and performed an acoustic show in the studios of Channel 7 in Sydney to support the release of his Flesh and Wood album. The show featured a number of new songs along with a selection of Barnes' (and his former band, Cold Chisel's) tracks. It was released on VHS in 1994 and on DVD in 2005.

Barnes later commented on Gehman's recording methods, "He wouldn't use any real drumkits. Every day we would put together various bits and pieces from the kitchen and hit them in front of microphones. Pots, pans, you name it, we hit it. Cardboard boxes instead of bass drums, jars filled with rice and used as shakers."

== Reviews ==
Professional ratings
Review scores
Source	Rating
AllMusic	link
Music Week	3/5 stars

Jonathan Lewis from AllMusic rated it as four-out-of-five stars and explained, "Flesh and Wood was Barnes' attempt at an unplugged album, and featured duets with other Australian rock luminaries. While it contains some of Barnes' own material and some covers (including Cold Chisel's superb 'Flame Trees'), few songs here manage to match the originals; fewer still eclipse them. A competent album that shows a more sophisticated side to Barnes that was hinted at with Soul Deep."

== Track listing ==
1. "It Will Be Alright"
2. "The Weight" (with the Badloves)
3. "Ride the Night Away" (Steve Jordan, Steven Van Zandt)
4. "Guilty" (with Joe Cocker)
5. "You Can't Make Love Without a Soul"
6. "Hell of a Time" (with Ross Wilson)
7. "Brother of Mine" (with Tommy Emmanuel)
8. "Fade to Black"
9. "Flame Trees"
10. "Still Got a Long Way to Go" (with Diesel)
11. "Still on Your Side"
12. "Stone Cold" (with Don Walker)
13. "Let It Go" (with Deborah Conway)
14. "We Could Be Gone" (with Archie Roach)
15. "Love Me Tender"

== Chart positions ==
=== Weekly charts ===
Chart (1993/94)	Peak position
Australian Albums (ARIA)	2
New Zealand Albums (RMNZ)	9

=== Year-end charts ===
Chart (1993)	Position
ARIA Albums Chart	34
Australian Artist Albums Chart	6

Chart (1994)	Position
ARIA Albums Chart	21
Australian Artist Albums Chart	3

== Certifications ==
Region	Certification	Certified units/sales
Australia (ARIA)	3× Platinum	210,000^{^}
New Zealand (RMNZ)	Gold	7,500^{^}
^{^} Shipments figures based on certification alone.

== Personnel ==
- Jimmy Barnes – vocals, acoustic guitar, percussion
- James Law – keyboards, vocals, djembe, bodhran, Jews harp, mellotron, bush harmonica
- Tony Brock – drums, percussion
- Jeff Neill – acoustic guitar, bass, bass drum
- Michael Hegerty – bass
- John Shenale – piano
- The Badloves – Michael Spiby (vocals, acoustic guitar), John Housden (acoustic guitar), Stephen O'Prey (bass), Tony Featherstone (piano), Chris Tabone (percussion)), track 2
- Diesel – acoustic guitar and vocals, track 10
- Joe Cocker – vocals, track 4
- Ross Wilson – vocals, track 6
- Tommy Emmanuel – acoustic guitar, track 7
- Don Walker – piano, track 12
- Deborah Conway – vocals, track 13
- Archie Roach – vocals, track 14
- Lawrie Minson – dobro, slide guitar, acoustic guitar, harmonica
- Sunil de Silva – percussion
- Marcus Holden – violin
- Michelle Kelly – violin
- Angela Lindsay – viola
- Margaret Lindsay – cello
- Pixie Jenkins – fiddle
- Gary Steele – accordion
- James Ross – viola
- Ezra Kliger – violin
- Nancy Roth – violin
- Nancy Stein-Ross – cello
- Matt Branton – bass
- Roy Martin – drums
- Guy Davies – vibes
- Allan Dargin – yidaki
- Wendy Fraser, Portia Griffin, Jessica Williams – backing vocals

== 2015 Tour ==
During Barnes' 30:30 Hindsight tour in 2014, Barnes performed a number of songs from Flesh and Wood, inspiring a 2015 national tour of its own. "The band and I are looking forward to playing all these great songs again, with a bit of storytelling and strings thrown in, when we take the show around the country in July", said Barnes.

Date	Location	Venue
Friday, 3 July 2015	Brisbane	Concert Hall, QPAC
Saturday, 4 July 2015	Toowoomba	Empire Theatre
Friday, 10 July 2015	Perth	Crown Theatre
Saturday, 11 July 2015	Adelaide	Adelaide Entertainment Centre
Friday, 17 July 2015	Sydney	State Theatre
Saturday, 18 July 2015	Melbourne	Palais Theatre
Friday, 24 July 2015	Gold Coast	Jupiters Hotel and Casino

=== Set list ===
This is the set list from Brisbane, on 3 July 2015:

1. "Is My Living in Vain"
2. "Wade in the Water"
3. "Stupid Heart" (from Rage and Ruin, 2010)
4. "Fade to Black" (from Flesh and Wood, 1993)
5. "Guilty" (from Flesh and Wood, 1993)
6. "Hell of a Time" (from Flesh and Wood, 1993)
7. "You Can’t Make Love Without a Soul" (from Flesh and Wood, 1993)
8. "Better off Alone" (from Out of the Blue, 2007)
9. "Stone Cold" (from Flesh and Wood, 1993)
10. "My Baby just Cares for Me" (from The Rhythm and the Blues, 2009)
11. "Around the World"
12. "Ride the Night Away" (from Flesh and Wood, 1993)
13. "Flame Trees" (from Flesh and Wood, 1993)
14. "It Will Be Alright" (from Flesh and Wood, 1993)
15. "Brother of Mine" (from Flesh and Wood, 1993)
16. "Still Got a Long Way to Go" (from Flesh and Wood, 1993)
17. "Over the Rainbow" (Judy Garland cover)
18. "Missing a Girl" (from Cold Chisel, No Plans, 2012)
19. "Let It Go" (from Flesh and Wood, 1993)
20. "By the Grace of God" (from Love and Fear, 1999)
21. "Largs Pier Hotel" (from Rage and Ruin, 2010)
22. "The Weight" (from Flesh and Wood, 1993)
23. "We Could Be Gone" (from Flesh and Wood, 1993)
24. "Working Class Man" (from For the Working Class Man, 1985)
25. "Blue Hotel" (from Out of the Blue, 2007)
26. "Four Walls" (from Cold Chisel, East, 1980)
27. "Catch Your Shadow" (from Heat, 1993)
28. "Still on Your Side" (from Flesh and Wood, 1993)
29. "I Put a Spell on You" (Screaming Jay Hawkins cover)
30. "When the War Is Over" (from Cold Chisel, Circus Animals, 1982)
31. "Resurrection Shuffle" (Ashton Gardner & Dyke cover)
32. "Khe Sanh" (from Cold Chisel, Cold Chisel, 1978)
33. "Love Me Tender" (from Flesh and Wood, 1993)
