= Still Got a Long Way to Go =

1994 single by Jimmy Barnes and Diesel

Single by Jimmy Barnes with Diesel

from the album Flesh and Wood
- Released: 9 May 1994
- Recorded: EMI (Cologne, Germany)
- Label: Mushroom
- Songwriter: Diesel
- Producers: Don Gehman, Jimmy Barnes

Jimmy Barnes singles chronology
"You Can't Make Love Without a Soul" (1994)	"Still Got a Long Way to Go" (1994)	"It Will Be Alright" (1994)

Diesel singles chronology
"I've Been Loving You Too Long" (1993)	"Still Got a Long Way to Go" (1994)	"All Come Together" (1994)

"Still Got a Long Way to Go" is a duet by Australian musicians Jimmy Barnes and Diesel. It was released as the third and final single from Barnes' seventh studio album, Flesh and Wood (1993). Barnes and Diesel performed the song on live TV, and a black and white music video was released to promote the song.

== Track listings ==
White disc

1. "Still Got a Long Way to Go" (Diesel)
2. "You Can't Make Love Without a Soul" (live) (by Jimmy Barnes) (Barnes, Wilson)
3. "Flame Trees" (live) (by Jimmy Barnes) (Steve Prestwich, Don Walker)
4. "(Sittin' On) The Dock of the Bay" (live) (by Jimmy Barnes) (Steve Cropper, Otis Redding)
- All live tracks were recorded at Triple M Sydney on 23 February 1994.

Black disc

1. "Still Got a Long Way to Go" (with Diesel)
2. "I Saw Her Standing There" (live) (John Lennon, Paul McCartney) (by Jimmy Barnes)
3. "I'd Rather Be Blind" (live) (Barnes) (by Jimmy Barnes)
4. "Catch Your Shadow" (live) (Barnes, Neill, Wilson Wilson) (by Jimmy Barnes)
5. "Still Got a Long Way to Go" (live)
- Tracks two to four were recorded in Hamburg, Germany, on 28 January 1994. Track five was recorded in Channel 7 Studios, Sydney, on 11 December 1993

== Credits ==
- Acoustic Guitar – Diesel
- Arranged By [Strings] – John Philip Shenale
- Backing Vocals – Jessica Williams, Portia Griffin, Wendy Frasier)
- Bass – Matt Branton
- Cello – Nancy Stein-Ross
- Drums – Roy Martin
- Vibraphone [Vibes] – Guy Davis
- Viola – James Ross
- Violin – Ezra Kilger, Nancy Rothin

== Charts ==
Chart (1994)	Peak position
Australia (ARIA)	57
