= Last Frontier =

- Australian cover

Single by Jimmy Barnes

from the album Barnstorming
- Released: January 1989
- Recorded: December 1987 – February 1988
- Label: Mushroom
- Songwriter(s): Jimmy Barnes; Jonathan Cain
- Producer(s): Mike Stone; Jonathan Cain

Jimmy Barnes singles chronology
| "When a Man Loves a Woman (live)" (1988) | "Last Frontier" (1989) | "Lay Down Your Guns" (1990) |

"Last Frontier" is a song by Australian rock singer, Jimmy Barnes, from his third studio album, Freight Train Heart.

A live version was released in January 1989 as the second and final single from Barnes' first live album, Barnstorming. The song peaked at number 31 in Australia.

== Track listing ==
Australian 7" single (Mushroom K784)/ 12" (Mushroom X13360)

- Side A "Last Frontier"
- Side B "Many Rivers to Cross" (with Crowded House)

== Music video ==
A music video was produced to promote the single.

== Charts ==
| Chart (1989) | Peak position |
|---|---|
| Australia (ARIA) | 31 |
