= Dallas Crane =

Australian rock band

- Origin: Melbourne, Victoria, Australia
- Genre: Alternative rock
- Years active: 1996–present
- Labels: Alberts/Festival Mushroom; Alberts/Sony/BMG; Nylon Sounds
- Members: Chris Brodie; Dave Larkin; Pete Satchell; Steve Pinkerton
- Past members: Shan Vanderwert; Pat Bourke
- Website: dallascrane.com.au

Dallas Crane are a triple ARIA Award–nominated Australian alternative rock band from Melbourne. Their self-titled third album was released on 10 July 2004, and it peaked in the ARIA Albums Chart top 50. Its lead single, "Dirty Hearts" (June 2004), debuted in the related ARIA Singles Chart top 50.

Dallas Crane's fourth album, Factory Girls, peaked in the top 30. Their highest charting single, "Sit on My Knee" – a duet with Jimmy Barnes – reached No. 14 in July 2005. In 2009 they featured as a support act for The Who on a national stadium tour. After re-grouping following a short hiatus in 2012, Dallas Crane began work on their 5th studio album "Scoundrels" featuring Chris Brodie on bass guitar, Dave Larkin on vocals and guitar, Steve Pinkerton on drums and Pete Satchell on guitar and vocals.

== History ==
=== 1996–1999: Formation and debut album ===
Dallas Crane formed in 1996 in Melbourne by Chris Brodie on bass guitar, Dave Larkin on lead vocals and guitar, Pete Satchell on guitar and vocals and Shan Vanderwert on drums. Satchell and Larkin were former school mates and Brodie and Vanderwert joined soon after. They rehearsed material for their debut album, Lent (1998), in a Port Melbourne oil shed on the property of Dallas Crane Transport. The local trucking company was owned by friends: their rehearsals were paid for in beer, and the group were renamed, Dallas Crane.

After working the Melbourne pub circuit they befriended local sound engineer, Robbie Rowlands, (The Fauves, Morning After Girls), who produced their debut self-funded album, Lent, which was released locally on their own label, Slant 6. Larkin later recalled "We were pretty young and that was the swag of songs we had at the time. It's a fairly incongruous record when you look at it, but we probably rate it as our favorite for that reason. And because it was our first and the whole recording experience was new to us."

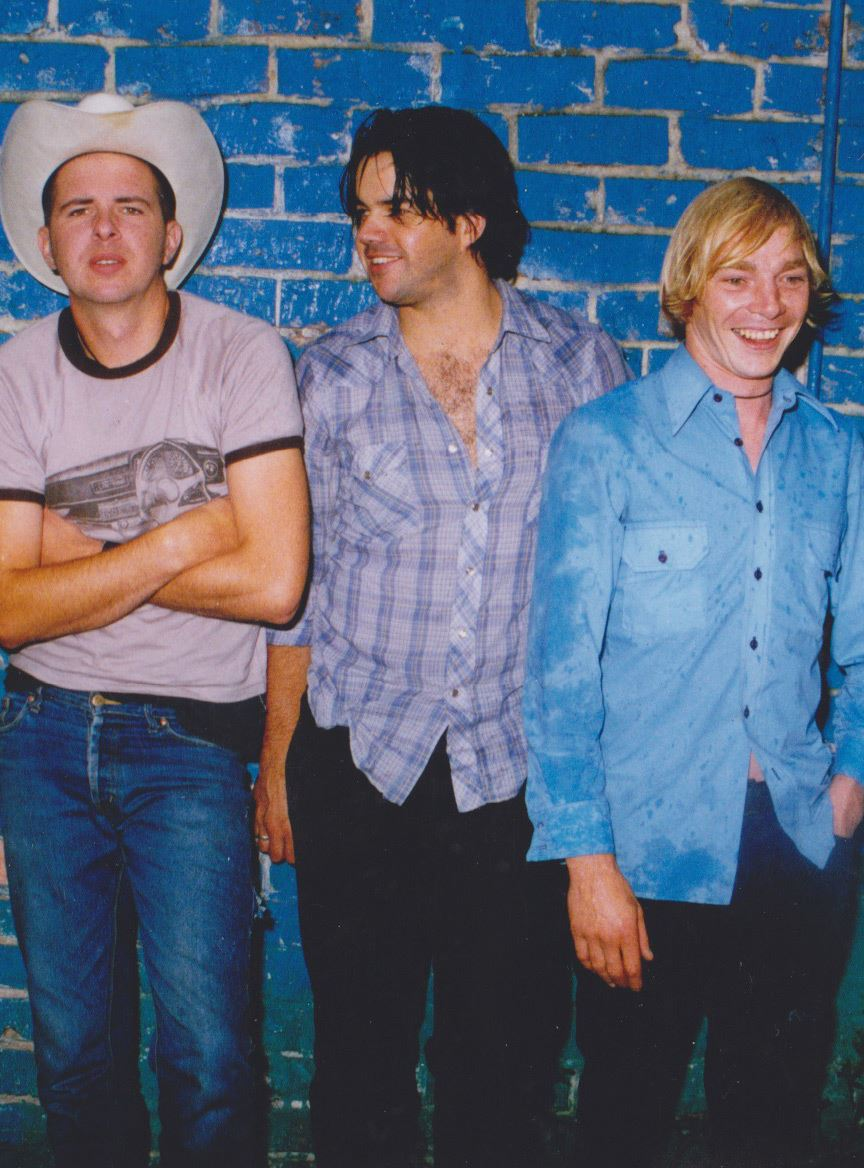
Dallas Crane, 2001

One of their fans was Richard Kingsmill of national radio station, Triple J, who invited them to record a track, "Nylon Don't Breathe", live in the ABC studios, during his Australian Music Show. The track was co-written by Larkin and Satchell: it appeared on the Five Alive: Live at the Wireless (1999) live 2× CD compilation. They were the only unsigned act of 35 artists to appear on the album. This endorsement led to wider interest in the band interstate as they began touring nationally.

=== 2000–2001: Twenty Four Seven to Dirty Deeds Soundtrack ===
Dallas Crane toured Australia in support of You Am I and then Regurgitator. Larkin later reflected that You Am I "were instrumental for us in many ways ... When we started out, they were the band that everyone wanted to be. If you could go really well in Australia, you would be going as well as You Am I. In terms of cred and how good you were as a live band, they were it." Dallas Crane became the head-liners at St. Kilda's Esplanade Hotel. Their live repertoire featured tracks that were recorded for a second studio album, Twenty Four Seven, which was released on 17 October 2000. They had recorded and mixed the album in a week at Melbourne's Hothouse Recording Studios with Craig Harnath producing. Shortly after its release Brodie left due to commitments with his brother Dan Brodie and their band, the Broken Arrows, which had signed to a record label, EMI. Chris Brodie was replaced in Dallas Crane by Pat Bourke on bass guitar in early 2001.

Twenty Four Seven received widely positive responses from Australian rock music critics with local rock street press, Beat Magazine and In-Press, hailing it as "Album of the Week" and "Rock Record of the Summer", respectively. The lead track, "Sit on My Knee", which was written by Larkin, was released as a single. It was placed on high rotation by Triple J. The group followed with "Sold Me" and "Already Gone".

Dallas Crane won Best Live Band at the Australian Live Music Awards, leading to them representing their country at the International Live Music Awards in London in 2002, featuring their debut performance at Shepherd's Bush Empire alongside Russell Crowe's "Thirty Odd Foot of Grunt"

They continued to win support slots to a number of artists including Ryan Adams, The Black Keys, You Am I and Rocket Science. During their shows with You Am I, lead singer Tim Rogers touted, "Dallas Crane is the best band in the country" and made reference to them in the You Am I single, "Who Put the Devil in You" (September 2002). Rogers curated the soundtrack for a feature film, Dirty Deeds (2002), and asked Dallas Crane to supply a cover version of "Wild About You", originally performed by Australian 1960's band, the Missing Links.

=== 2002–2003: No Through Road to Ladybird EPs ===
Midway through 2002 Dallas Crane signed a management deal with talent managers, Majorbox Music, in Melbourne. The band's follow up release was a five-track extended play, No Through Road. It was also released as a 7" vinyl single, with the title track and a raucous B-side, "Wannabe". It was recorded at Sing Sing Studios with Rowlands as producer. The song was well received critically and earned high-rotation on Triple J, consolidating them as a prospering force in the local music scene.

Dallas Crane continued to tour Australia, joining the Whitlams, and Rocket Science on national runs consecutively. They played at Homebake in Sydney in 2003, joining fellow Australian groups the Church and Nick Cave & The Bad Seeds for the festival's line-up. Then they teamed up with music mates Dan Brodie and the Broken Arrows and Dan Kelly and the Alpha Males for a national tour, Dan Does Dallas.

Dallas Crane started their own headline tour promoting No Through Road and finished the year at Melbourne's Big Day Out festival. Shortly after that performance, they gathered backstage to sign with Albert Productions, joining label mates AC/DC on a roster that had included the Easybeats and Rose Tattoo. "Ladybird" was released in November 2003 as the first official Alberts' release leading to more high-rotation on Triple J.

=== 2004–2005: Self-titled album ===
Dallas Crane recorded its self-titled third album with Australian producer Wayne Connolly, (You Am I, Underground Lovers). Bourke described how "Wayne saw us play once and loved the show. He seemed to know what to do with us." Its lead single, "Dirty Hearts", was issued ahead of the album in June, which debuted in the ARIA Singles Charts Top 50.

The album reached the top 50 on the related ARIA Albums Chart in July 2004. It was acclaimed as their best effort, Graeme Hammond of Sunday Herald Sun praised it as "an Australian classic." The group received three nominations at the ARIA Music Awards of 2004, Best Breakthrough Artist – Album and Best Rock Album for Dallas Crane and Best Breakthrough Artist – Single for "Dirty Hearts". In July they toured the Australian east coast under the pseudonym, Beige Visitors, alongside You Am I, which used the moniker, the Question Fruit.

The singles "Dirty Hearts" and "Numb All Over" went on to achieve high-rotation on Triple J, setting up a string of sellout tours to follow. Both songs featured on the Triple J's Hottest 100 album for 2005. Also in that year they re-recorded "Sit on My Knee" as a duet with Jimmy Barnes for his album, Double Happiness (July 2005), which was issued as a single. It peaked at No. 14 on the ARIA Singles Chart. According to Michael Tran of Oz Music Project, "It's always debateable [sic] whether the world needs more well-written, competently played, blues rock... [this] is [Dallas Crane's] song, after all. Always one of the strongest in their catalogue, this recording offers simply a spit-and-buff job to the original. The production is cleaner and brighter than the more lo-fi original; radio will love the sound. And really, there's nothing at all wrong with it."

In August 2005 the group provided a cover version of "Dig It Up" for the Hoodoo Gurus tribute album, Stoneage Cameos, by various Australian artists. Bourke was also a member of a short-term super-group, The Wrights, which provided their rendition of "(Let's All) Turn On".

=== 2006: Factory Girls ===
In early 2006 Dallas Crane released a single, "Lovers and Sinners", making it freely available via their website. The band's fourth album, Factory Girls, recorded with producers, Connolly and Jonathan Burnside, was released on 16 September 2006. It reached No. 30 in October – their highest charting album. It first single, "Curiosity", was released physically on 26 August 2006, following a pre-release on the Australian iTunes Music Store. Rolling Stone Australia magazine rated it as four out of five. Craig Mathieson of The Age felt that "by dint of songwriting strength, ease of expression and a touch of studio sweat – Melbourne four-piece Dallas Crane stay on the right side of the great divide... between being timeless and out of time."

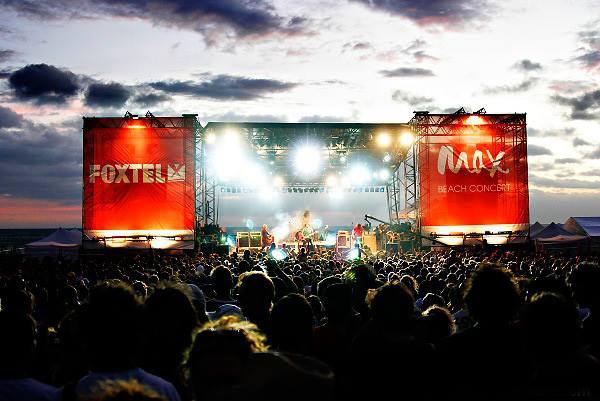
Dallas Crane, headlining St. Kilda Festival 2007

In August 2006 the band commenced an east coast tour of Australia to promote their new material. A performance at Brisbane's The Zoo received positive reviews in local independent media and reaffirmed the band's popularity as a rock act. They undertook a more extensive tour during September, and then travelled overseas for their second United Kingdom visit, following with an appearance at the SXSW Festival in Austin, Texas. They performed in Japan on the way home from the tour which saw them garner interest from offshore recording labels.

With close to 1500 acts from around the world performing gigs, Dallas Crane joined a local contingent of Australasian artists at SXSW 2007, alongside Beasts of Bourbon, You Am I, Hoodoo Gurus, Expatriate, Youth Group and Airbourne. Their United States visit saw them also perform at the Los Angeles venue The Troubadour, New York's Bowery Ballroom, and Boston's Middle East Club. On returning to Australia, in early 2007, they headlined a national tour with support from burgeoining rock act Airbourne, their last for what was to become a brief hiatus away from the touring circuit.

=== 2007–2011: Taking a break ===
After performing for almost eleven years Dallas Crane finished their tour with a headline spot at Melbourne's St.Kilda Festival in February 2007. In 2009 they reunited briefly after being asked to join UK rock act, the Who, on six arena dates of their national tour, which included a spot at Melbourne's Grand Prix.

During the hiatus Dave Larkin released two albums with his three-piece act, Gun Street Girls. Pete Satchell had his own solo moniker, Pete Sounds. Dallas Crane reunited again in early 2010 to play a farewell gig for the family of the band's namesake, Dallas Crane (of the trucking company), who had died of cancer.

=== 2012–present:Scoundrels ===
Dallas Crane resumed in 2012 with Larkin and Satchell writing new material. The line-up had changed, bassist Pat Bourke and drummer Shan Vanderwert were replaced by Chris Brodie and Steve Pinkerton, respectively. The renewed group's first single, "I'm Sorry Darling", was released, digitally and on 7", in October 2013, with the official music video issued in January 2014.

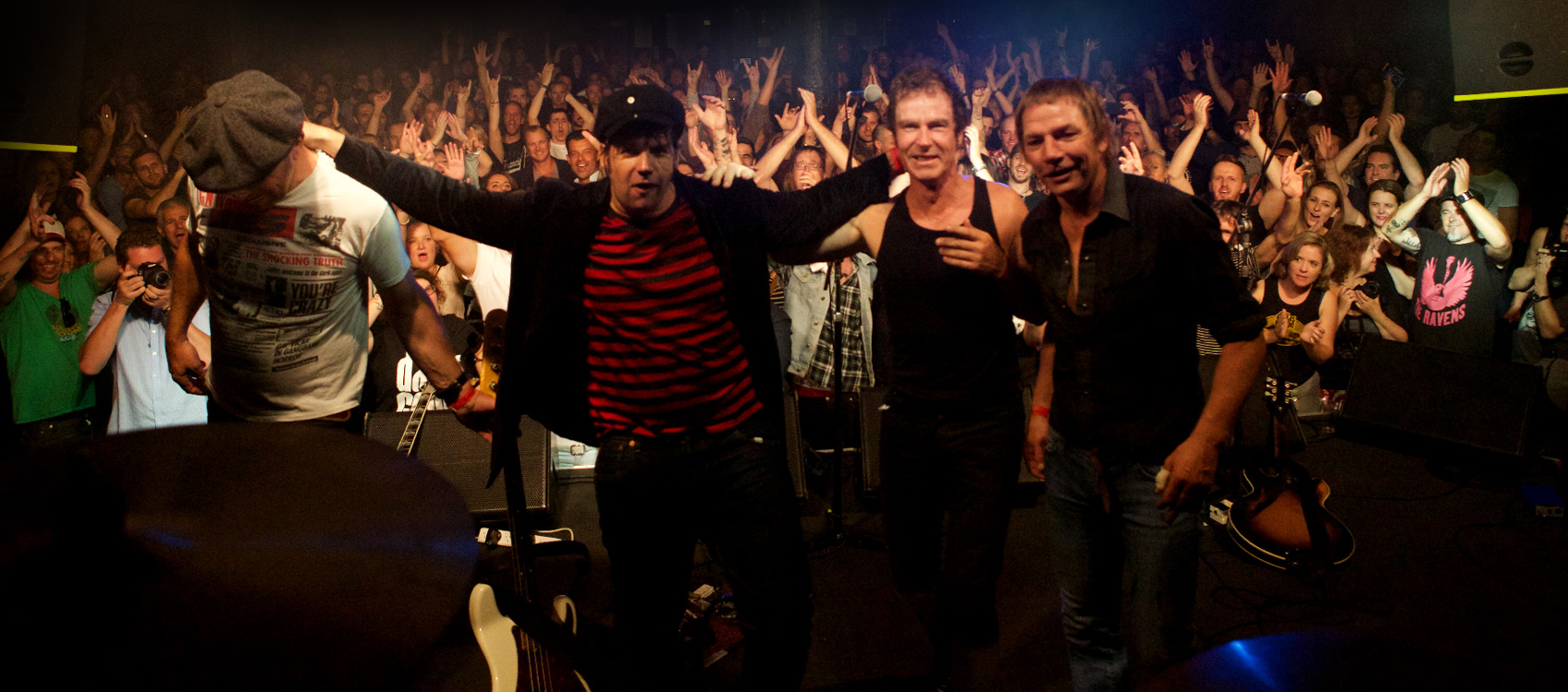
Dallas Crane salute a full house at Melbourne's Corner Hotel, February 2016

In November 2015 they provided their fifth studio album, Scoundrels, which was produced by Harnath. Andrew McMillen of The Australian rated it 4.5 stars claiming, "It's a towering achievement that sees Dallas Crane exhibiting that key-in-lock feel sought by every rock band. These four players are masters of their craft. The band's time off has been well-spent, as every idea here hits the mark. If anything, it's an embarrassment of riches." Rolling Stone's Jaymz Clements rated it as four out of five, and felt that "Dallas Crane have grown into a smarter, better band is no surprise. That they've given themselves a masterful Don Walker-ish overhaul certainly is. Scoundrels is intelligent, bluesy, mature and unpredictable..."

From late December 2015 and into April 2016 the group undertook a national headline tour promoting the album.

In October 2016, the band released the single "Cheyenne" (digital only) also recorded by Jez Giddings and Craig Harnath at Melbourne's Hothouse Audio.

In August 2022, Dallas Crane opened for Kiss at Melbourne's Rod Laver Arena.

== Discography ==
=== Studio albums ===
Title	Details	Peak chart positions
Title	Details	AUS
Lent	Released: 1998; Label: Dallas Crane; Format: CD	—
Twenty Four Seven	Released: October 2000; Label: Slant6 (DC-170689 2); Format: CD	—
Dallas Crane	Released: July 2004; Label: Albert Music Productions / Sony BMG (33810-2); Format: CD	49
Factory Girls	Released: September 2006; Label: Albert Music Productions / Sony BMG (8869-701041-2); Format: CD, LP, Digital	30
Scoundrels	Released: November 2015; Label: Nylon Sounds (NYLDCSC001); Format: CD, LP, Digital	—

=== Extended plays ===
Title	Details	Peak chart positions
Title	Details	AUS
No Through Road	Released: 2003; Label: Shock Records (BK001/ BK002); Format: CD, LP	—

=== Singles ===
Year	Title	Peak chart positions	Album
Year	Title	AUS	Album
2003	"Ladybird"	70	Dallas Crane
2004	"Dirty Hearts"	43	Dallas Crane
2004	"Numb All Over"	—	Dallas Crane
2005	"Sit on My Knee" (with Jimmy Barnes)	14	Double Happiness
2006	"Lovers and Sinners"	—	Factory Girls
2006	"Curiosity"	—	Factory Girls
2007	"Tonight! (There's A Party Going Down)"	—	Factory Girls
2007	"God Damn Pride"	—	Factory Girls
2013	"I'm Sorry Darlin'"	—	Scoundrels
2014	"Get Off the Dope"	—	Scoundrels
2016	"Cheyenne"	—	

== Awards and nominations ==
=== ARIA Music Awards ===
The ARIA Music Awards is an annual awards ceremony that recognises excellence, innovation, and achievement across all genres of Australian music. They commenced in 1987.

Year	Nominee / work	Award	Result	Ref.
2004	"Dirty Hearts"	Breakthrough Artist – Single	Nominated	
2004	Dallas Crane	Breakthrough Artist – Album	Nominated	
2004	Dallas Crane	Best Rock Album	Nominated	
