= Double Happiness (album) =

Studio album by Jimmy Barnes
- Released: 18 July 2005
- Recorded: 2004–05
- Genre: Rock
- Length: 52:24
- Label: Liberation Records
- Producer: Warren Costello

Jimmy Barnes chronology
Soul Deeper... Songs from the Deep South (2000)	Double Happiness (2005)	Out in the Blue (2007)

Singles from Double Happiness
- 1. "Higher" Released: 2002; 2. "Sit on My Knee" Released: 22 June 2005; 3. "Gonna Take Some Time" Released: October 2005; 4. "Bird on the Wire" Released: January 2006; 5. "Out of Time" Released: 15 May 2006

Double Happiness is the eleventh studio album by Australian singer Jimmy Barnes. It was released on 18 July 2005 on CD and vinyl. The album contains duets Barnes performed with various solo artists and bands.

== Track listing ==
1. "Sit on My Knee" (with Dallas Crane) (Dallas Crane)
2. "Gonna Take Some Time" (with Mahalia Barnes) (Jade MacRae, Mahalia Barnes)
3. "Attention" (with Roachford) (Andrew Roachford, Jimmy Barnes, Mark Lizotte)
4. "Run" (with Mica Paris) (Gerry DeVeaux, Mark Lizotte)
5. "What Will They Say" (with John Swan) (Darren Dowlut, Dennis Dowlut)
6. "Out of Time" (Rolling Stones cover; with Tim Rogers) (Mick Jagger, Keith Richards)
7. "Got You as a Friend" (with Diesel) (Dave Derby, Mark Lizotte)
8. "Resurrection Shuffle" (with The Living End) (Tony Ashton)
9. "Piece of My Heart" (with Tina Harrod) (Bert Berns, Jerry Ragovoy)
10. "Wichita Lineman" (Glen Campbell cover; with David Campbell) (Jimmy Webb)
11. "Same Woman" (with Jackie Barnes) (G. Cunningham, Jimmy Barnes)
12. "Say It Ain't So" (with Rahsaan Patterson) (J. Rogers, Jimmy Barnes, R. Patterson)
13. "I'll Be There" (Jackson 5 cover; with Elly-May Barnes) (Berry Gordy Jr., Bob West, Hal Davis, Willie M Hutchinson)
14. "Higher" (with Gary Pinto) (Gary Pinto, Mark Lizotte)
15. "Settle For Me" (with EJ Barnes) (EJ Barnes)
16. "Bird on the Wire" (Leonard Cohen cover; with Troy Cassar-Daley and Bella)
17. "Shout" (Isley Brothers cover; with Billy Thorpe)

== Chart positions ==
=== Weekly charts ===
Chart (2005/06)	Peak position
Australian Albums (ARIA)	1
New Zealand Albums (RMNZ)	29

=== Year-end charts ===
Chart (2005)	Position
ARIA Albums Chart	41
Australian Artist Albums Chart	14

== Certifications ==
Region	Certification	Certified units/sales
Australia (ARIA)	Platinum	70,000^{^}
^{^} Shipments figures based on certification alone.

== Personnel ==
- Kenny Aronoff – drums
- Kristian Attard – bass guitar
- Andrew Bain – French horn
- Jackie Barnes – percussion, congas
- Andrew Bickers – saxophone
- Dario Bortolin – bass guitar, acoustic guitar
- Mark Browne – bass guitar
- Harry Brus – bass guitar
- Clayton Doley – organ, piano
- Lachlan Doley – keyboards
- Clare Brassil – cello
- Mitch Farmer – drums
- Ben Gurton – trombone
- Todd Hardy – trumpet
- Michael Hegerty – bass guitar
- Marcus Holden – violin
- Adrian Keating – violin
- Andrea Keeble – violin
- Mark Kennedy – drums
- Stewart Kirwan – trumpet
- Angela Lindsay – viola
- Margaret Lindsay – cello
- Mark Lizotte – guitar, bass guitar, drums, Hammond organ, clavinet, xylophone
- Shelley Jamison – viola
- Lee Maloney – drums
- Lawrie Minson – pedal steel guitar, mandolin
- Ian Moss – guitar
- Roachford – organ, piano
- Stephanie Sarka – violin
- Philip Sayce – guitar
- Yak Sherrit – drums
- Danny Spencer – guitar
- Paul Thorne – trumpet, flugelhorn
- Matthew Tomkins – violin
- Warren Trout – drums
- Richie Vez – bass guitar, percussion

== See also ==
- List of number-one albums of 2005 (Australia)
