= Sit on My Knee =

"Sit On My Knee"

Single by Jimmy Barnes and Dallas Crane

from the album Double Happiness
- Released: 22 June 2005
- Recorded: 2005
- Genre: Rock
- Length: 2:44
- Label: Liberation Records
- Songwriter(s): Dave Larkin
- Producer(s): Warren Costello

Jimmy Barnes singles chronology
"Higher" (2002)	"Sit On My Knee" (2005)	"Gonna Take Some Time" (2005)

"Sit on My Knee" is a song written by Dave Larkin, the lead singer of Dallas Crane. Dallas Crane recorded a version for their second album, Twenty Four Seven. (2000)

In 2005, Jimmy Barnes released a version with Dallas Crane as the second single from his eleventh studio album, Double Happiness. The song peaked at No. 14 on the ARIA Singles Chart.

== Music video ==
The music video for "Sit on My Knee" contains Jimmy Barnes and Dallas Crane showing up at a Chinese pub and singing the song.

== Track listing ==
CD single

1. "Sit On My Knee" – 2:55
2. "Edgewood" (Jimmy Barnes) – 2:58
3. "Iodine" (Dallas Crane) – 2:45

== Charts ==
Chart (2005)	Peak position
Australia (ARIA)	14
