= Let's Make It Last All Night =

1990 single by Jimmy Barnes

Single by Jimmy Barnes

from the album Two Fires
- B-side: "Bad News"
- Released: 1 October 1990
- Length: 4:07
- Label: Mushroom
- Songwriter(s): Jimmy Barnes, Desmond Child, Diane Warren
- Producer(s): Don Gehman

Jimmy Barnes singles chronology
"Lay Down Your Guns" (1990)	"Let's Make It Last All Night" (1990)	"Little Darling" (1990)

"Let's Make It Last All Night" is a song by Australian rock musician Jimmy Barnes, released as the second single from his fourth studio album, Two Fires, on 1 October 1990. It reached number 12 on the Australian Singles Chart. The song was later included on his 1996 Barnes Hits Anthology album and his 2014 two-disc set 30:30 Hindsight.

== Track listing ==
7-inch and cassette single

1. "Let's Make It Last All Night" (written by Jimmy Barnes, Desmond Child, Diane Warren)
2. "Bad News" (written by Jay Williams, Jimmy Barnes, Tony Brock)

== Charts ==
"Let's Make It Last All Night" debuted at number 51 and peaked at number 12 on the Australian Singles Chart.

=== Weekly charts ===
Chart (1990)	Peak position
Australia (ARIA)	12

=== Year-end charts ===
Chart (1990)	Position
Australia (ARIA)	78
