= Sweat It Out (Jimmy Barnes song) =

1993 single by Jimmy Barnes

Single by Jimmy Barnes

from the album Heat
- B-side: "Tell Me the Truth", "Sitting in a Bar"
- Released: 11 January 1993
- Length: 3:59
- Label: Mushroom
- Songwriter(s): Jimmy Barnes
- Producer(s): Don Gehman

Jimmy Barnes singles chronology
"Simply the Best" (1992)	"Sweat It Out" (1993)	"Stand Up" (1993)

"Sweat It Out" is a song written and recorded by Australian rock musician Jimmy Barnes. Released in January 1993 as the lead single from his sixth studio album, Heat, the song peaked at number 11 on the Australian Singles Chart.

== Track listing ==
CD single

1. "Sweat It Out" – 3:59
2. "Tell Me the Truth" – 3:48
3. "Sitting in a Bar" – 3:59

== Charts ==
Chart (1993)	Peak position
Australia (ARIA)	11
New Zealand (Recorded Music NZ)	30
