= I'm Still on Your Side =

- Australian 12" cover

Single by Jimmy Barnes

from the album Freight Train Heart
- Released: March 1988
- Recorded: 1987
- Label: Mushroom/Geffen
- Songwriters: Jimmy Barnes; Jonathan Cain; Jim Vallance
- Producers: Jonathan Cain, Mike Stone

Jimmy Barnes singles chronology
"Driving Wheels" (1988)	"I'm Still on Your Side" (1988)	"Waitin' for the Heartache" (1988)

"I'm Still on Your Side" is a song by Australian rock singer, Jimmy Barnes. It was released in March 1988 as the third single from Barnes' third studio album, Freight Train Heart. The song peaked at number 29 in Australia and number 50 in New Zealand.

== Track listing ==
Australian 12" single (Mushroom X 13313)

- Side A "I'm on Your Side"
- Side B "Going to Mexico"

US 7" single (Geffen Records 7-27727)

- Side A "I'm on Your Side" - 3:54
- Side B "Lessons in Love" - 3:42

US CD single (Geffen Records PRO-CD-3244)

- track 1 "I'm on Your Side" - 3:54
- track 2 "Too Much Ain't Enough Love" (live) - 5:29
- track 3 "Working Class Man" (live) - 4:14

== Music video ==
A music video was produced to promote the single.

It was shot in and around the Hawkesbury River, Hawkesbury River Railway Bridge, and Hawkesbury River railway station in Brooklyn, New South Wales, Australia in 1987.

== Charts ==
Chart (1988)	Peak position
Australia (Kent Music Report)	29
New Zealand (Recorded Music NZ)	50
