= When Your Love Is Gone =

1991 single by Jimmy Barnes

Single by Jimmy Barnes

from the album Two Fires
- Released: 11 March 1991
- Length: 5:12
- Label: Mushroom
- Songwriters: Jimmy Barnes, Tony Brock, Kevin Savigar
- Producer: Don Gehman

Jimmy Barnes singles chronology
"Little Darling" (1990)	"When Your Love Is Gone" (1991)	"Love Is Enough" (1991)

"When Your Love Is Gone" is a song by Australian rock musician Jimmy Barnes. Released on 11 March 1991, the song peaked at number seven on the Australian ARIA Singles Chart and number 17 on New Zealand's RIANZ Singles Chart.

== Background ==
The music video consists of a live concert performance of the song by Barnes, accompanied by adult and children backup singers (including his own children, who had formed their own group called The Tin Lids).

== Release and reception ==
"When Your Love Is Gone" was released in March 1991 as the fourth single from his fourth studio album, Two Fires. It peaked at number seven on the Australian ARIA Singles Chart.

== Track listing ==
1. "When Your Love Is Gone" – 5:12
2. "I'm Still On Your Side" (live) – 4:40
3. "One of a Kind" (live) – 4:43

== Charts ==
Chart (1991)	Peak position
Australia (ARIA)	7
New Zealand (Recorded Music NZ)	17

== Certifications ==
Region	Certification	Certified units/sales
Australia (ARIA)	Gold	35,000^{^}
^{^} Shipments figures based on certification alone.
