= Two Fires =

Studio album by Jimmy Barnes
- Released: 7 September 1990
- Studios: Rhinoceros (Sydney, Australia); Chapel (Encino, California)
- Genre: Rock
- Length: 46:15
- Label: Mushroom
- Producer: Don Gehman

Jimmy Barnes chronology
Barnestorming (1988)	Two Fires (1990)	Soul Deep (1991)

Singles from Two Fires
- 1. "Lay Down Your Guns" Released: 16 July 1990; 2. "Let's Make It Last All Night" Released: 1 October 1990; 3. "Little Darling" Released: 26 November 1990; 4. "When Your Love Is Gone" Released: 11 March 1991; 5. "Love Is Enough" Released: 15 July 1991

Two Fires is the fourth studio album by the Australian rock singer Jimmy Barnes, and his first United States release for Atlantic Records. It was released in Australia by Mushroom Records and was his fifth consecutive No. 1 album, debuting in September 1990 and remaining at the position for four weeks. On 16 June 1991, Two Fires again reached No. 1, making it the only Barnes album to achieve such a feat. The title track, "Between Two Fires", was co-written with the hit songwriter, Holly Knight. It notably added "Stick to Your Guns".

== Track listing ==
1. "Lay Down Your Guns" (Jimmy Barnes, Rick Nowels)
2. "Let's Make It Last All Night" (Barnes, Diane Warren, Desmond Child)
3. "Little Darling" (Barnes)
4. "Love Is Enough" (Barnes, Marvin Etzioni, Sandford, Thomas, Froggatt)
5. "Hardline" (Barnes, Tony Brock, Jay Williams, Savigar)
6. "One of a Kind" (Barnes, Brock, Williams, Savigar)
7. "Sister Mercy" (Barnes, Ross Wilson, Neill)
8. "When Your Love is Gone" (Barnes, Brock, Savigar)
9. "Between Two Fires" (Barnes, Holly Knight)
10. "Fade to Black" (Barnes, Bailey)
11. "Hold On" (Barnes, Brock, Williams)
12. "Stick to Your Guns" (Brock)

== Singles ==
3 certain tracks from the Two Fires sessions did not make it to the final album, but they appeared as B-sides of the album's singles. These include:

1. "Broken Hearts" (B-side of "Lay Down Your Guns")
2. "Bad News" (B-side of "Let's Make It Last All Night")
3. "No Frills" (B-side of "Little Darling")

== Personnel ==
- Jimmy Barnes – vocals
- Jeff Neill, Mark Lizotte, Brian Setzer, Todd Sharp, Wally Stocker – guitar
- Jimmy Haslip – bass
- Tony Brock – drums
- Kevin Savigar – keyboards
- Eliza-Jane 'E.J.' Barnes, Jackie Barnes, Jane Barnes, Jimmy Barnes, Mahalia Barnes, Spencer Brock, Taylor Brock, Tony Brock, Leanne D'Hudson, Wendy Fraser, Grace Gehman, Portia Griffin, Marcy Levy, Jeff Neill, Brian Setzer, Todd Sharp, Jade Thacker, Nicholas Thacker, Sue Thacker, Tyler Thacker, Debbie Harwood – backing vocals

Technical

- Rick O'Neil – mastering engineer

== Charts ==
=== Weekly charts ===
Weekly chart performance for Two Fires
Chart (1990/91)	Peak position
Australian Albums (ARIA)	1
New Zealand Albums (RMNZ)	1

=== Year-end charts ===
Year-end chart performance for Two Fires
Chart (1990)	Position
Australian Albums (ARIA)	4
Chart (1991)	Position
Australian Albums (ARIA)	5
New Zealand Albums (RIANZ)	3

== Sales and certifications ==
Certifications and sales Two Fires
Region	Certification	Certified units/sales
Australia (ARIA)	6× Platinum	420,000^{^}
New Zealand (RMNZ)	Platinum	15,000^{^}
^{^} Shipments figures based on certification alone.

== See also ==
- List of number-one albums in Australia during the 1990s
