= Right by Your Side (Jimmy Barnes song) =

1993 single by Jimmy Barnes

Single by Jimmy Barnes

from the album Heat
- B-side: "Lovething"; "Love Will Find a Way"
- Released: 2 August 1993
- Label: Mushroom
- Songwriter(s): Jimmy Barnes; Jane Barnes
- Producer(s): Don Gehman

Jimmy Barnes singles chronology
"Stone Cold" (1993)	"Right by Your Side" (1993)	"The Weight" (1993)

"Right by Your Side" is a song written and performed by Australian rock musician Jimmy Barnes. Released in August 1993 as the fourth and final single from his sixth studio album, Heat, the song peaked at number 43 on the Australian ARIA Singles Chart.

== Track listing ==
CD single

1. "Right by Your Side"
2. "Lovething"
3. "Love Will Find a Way" (Rough mix)

== Charts ==
Chart (1993)	Peak position
Australia (ARIA)	43
