= Change of Heart (Jimmy Barnes song) =

1995 single by Jimmy Barnes

Single by Jimmy Barnes

from the album Psyclone
- B-side: "Edgewood"; "The Other Side"
- Released: 1 May 1995
- Length: 4:01
- Label: Mushroom
- Songwriters: Jimmy Barnes; Jeff Neill; Michael Hegarty; Guy Davies
- Producers: Joe Hardy; Jimmy Barnes

Jimmy Barnes singles chronology
"It Will Be Alright" (1994)	"Change of Heart" (1995)	"Come Undone" (1995)

"Change of Heart" is a song by Australian rock musician Jimmy Barnes. Released in May 1995 as the lead single from his eighth studio album, Psyclone (1995), the song peaked at number 17 on the Australian ARIA Singles Chart.

== Track listings ==
CD Single

1. "Change of Heart" – 4:01
2. "Edgewood" – 2:57
3. "The Other Side" – 4:16

CD Maxi

1. "Change of Heart"
2. "Come Undone" (live acoustic version)
3. "You Can't Always Get What You Want" (live acoustic version)
4. "Many Rivers to Cross" (live acoustic version)

== Charts ==
Chart (1995)	Peak position
Australia (ARIA)	17
New Zealand (Recorded Music NZ)	31
