= Heat (Jimmy Barnes album) =

Jimmy Barnes album

Studio album by Jimmy Barnes
- Released: 28 March 1993
- Studio: Festival (Sydney, Australia)
- Genre: Rock
- Length: 67:13
- Label: Mushroom
- Producer: Don Gehman

Jimmy Barnes chronology
| Soul Deep (1991) | Heat (1993) | Flesh and Wood (1993) |

Singles from Heat
- 1. "Sweat It Out" Released: 11 January 1993; 2. "Stand Up" Released: 28 February 1993; 3. "Stone Cold" Released: May 1993; 4. "Right by Your Side" Released: 2 August 1993

Heat is the sixth studio album by Australian rock singer Jimmy Barnes. It reached number 2 on the ARIA album charts in 1993, and features the singles "Sweat It Out", "Stand Up", "Right By Your Side", and "Stone Cold", the first song written by Cold Chisel keyboardist Don Walker for Barnes since the band's demise in 1983.

== Track listing ==
1. "Sweat It Out" (Jimmy Barnes)
2. "Wheels In Motion" (Jimmy Barnes, Jeff Neill, Ross Wilson)
3. "Stand Up" (Jimmy Barnes, Jeff Neill, Kenny Miller)
4. "Burn Baby Burn" (Jimmy Barnes, Jeff Neill, Tony Brock)
5. "Something's Got a Hold" (Jimmy Barnes, Chris Bailey, Jeff Neill)
6. "Love Thing" (Jimmy Barnes, Jeff Neill, Tony Brock)
7. "Talking to You" (Jimmy Barnes, Jeff Neill, Tony Brock)
8. "Stone Cold" (Don Walker)
9. "Wait for Me" (Jimmy Barnes, Jeff Neill, Tony Brock)
10. "Tears We Cry" (Jimmy Barnes)
11. "Right by Your Side" (Jimmy Barnes, Jane Barnes)
12. "A Little Bit of Love" (Jimmy Barnes, Tony Brock, Jerry Lynn Williams)
13. "I'd Rather Be Blind" (Jimmy Barnes)
14. "Not the Loving Kind" (Jimmy Barnes, Jerry Lynn Williams)
15. "Knock Me Down" (Jimmy Barnes, Jeff Neill, Tony Brock)
16. "Catch Your Shadow" (Jimmy Barnes, Jeff Neill, Ross Wilson, Pat Wilson)

== 2010 expanded edition ==
In 2010, Heat was re-released with an additional four tracks originally left off the album, becoming a double album. It was resequenced by Jimmy Barnes, and featured another Don Walker composition, "Sitting in A Bar", which Walker recorded with his own band, Tex, Don and Charlie. The cover was modified, removing Barnes' name and changing the colour tone to an earthy red.

== 2010 version track listing ==
Disc 1

1. Sweat it Out
2. Sitting In A Bar*
3. Wheels in Motion
4. Stand Up
5. Tell Me The Truth*
6. Burn Baby Burn
7. Something's Got a Hold
8. Rather Be With You*
9. Love Thing
10. Stone Cold

Disc 2

1. I'd Rather be Blind
2. Wait for Me
3. Tears We Cry
4. Talking to You
5. Right by Your Side
6. A Little Bit of Love
7. Not the Loving Kind
8. Love Will Find A Way*
9. Knock Me Down
10. Catch Your Shadow

== Personnel ==
- Jimmy Barnes – vocals and guitar
- Tony Brock – drums, percussion
- Jeff Neill – guitar, vocals
- Michael Hegerty – bass
- Phil Shenale – keyboards

== Chart positions ==
=== Weekly charts ===
| Chart (1993) | Peak position |
|---|---|
| Australian Albums (ARIA) | 2 |
| New Zealand Albums (RMNZ) | 3 |
| Swedish Albums (Sverigetopplistan) | 50 |

=== Year-end charts ===
| Chart (1993) | Position |
|---|---|
| ARIA Albums Chart | 15 |
| Australian Artist Albums Chart | 2 |
| New Zealand Albums (RMNZ) | 43 |

== Sales and certifications ==
| Region | Certification | Certified units/sales |
|---|---|---|
| Australia (ARIA) | Platinum | 70,000^{^} |
| New Zealand (RMNZ) | Gold | 7,500^{^} |
^{^} Shipments figures based on certification alone.
