= Waitin' for the Heartache =

- Australian 7" cover

Single by Jimmy Barnes

from the album Freight Train Heart
- Released: 4 July 1988
- Recorded: 1987
- Label: Mushroom
- Songwriter(s): Jimmy Barnes; Desmond Child
- Producer(s): Desmond Child

Jimmy Barnes singles chronology
"I'm Still on Your Side" (1988)	"Waitin' for the Heartache" (1988)	"When a Man Loves a Woman (live)" (1988)

"Waitin' for the Heartache" is a song by Australian rock singer, Jimmy Barnes. It was released in July 1988 as the fourth and final single from Barnes' third studio album, Freight Train Heart. The song peaked at number 33 in Australia.

The song was released in different versions: On the Freight Train Heart album version released on the Geffen label (GED 24146) and in the music video starting from 3'50'' background singing was added, and lead singing has been varied compared to the Mushroom label album version (CD 53238).

A cover version of the song was recorded by the American singer Jennifer Rush in 1992 on her self-titled album "Jennifer Rush".

== Track listing ==
Australian 7" single (Mushroom K532)

- Side A "Waitin' for the Heartache"
- Side B "Seven Days" (American Mix)

Australian 12" single (Mushroom X-14600)

- Side A "Waitin' for the Heartache"
- Side B "Seven Days" (American Mix)
- Side B "Seven Days" (12" Mix)

== Music video ==
A music video was produced to promote the single.

== Charts ==
Chart (1988)	Peak position
Australia (ARIA)	33
