= Lay Down Your Guns =

1990 single by Jimmy Barnes

Single by Jimmy Barnes

from the album Two Fires
- B-side: "Broken Hearts"
- Released: 16 July 1990
- Length: 4:00
- Label: Mushroom
- Songwriters: Jimmy Barnes, Rick Nowels
- Producer: Don Gehman

Jimmy Barnes singles chronology
"Last Frontier" (live) (1989)	"Lay Down Your Guns" (1990)	"Let's Make It Last All Night" (1990)

"Lay Down Your Guns" is a song by Australian rock musician Jimmy Barnes. It was released on 16 July 1990 as the lead single from his fourth studio album, Two Fires. The song reached number four in Australia and number 12 in New Zealand.

== Charts ==
=== Weekly charts ===
Chart (1990)	Peak position
Australia (ARIA)	4
New Zealand (Recorded Music NZ)	12

=== Year-end charts ===
Chart (1990)	Position
Australia (ARIA)	23
New Zealand (RIANZ)	44

== Certifications ==
Region	Certification	Certified units/sales
Australia (ARIA)	Platinum	70,000^{^}
^{^} Shipments figures based on certification alone.
