= Little Darling =

1990 single by Jimmy Barnes

Single by Jimmy Barnes

from the album Two Fires
- B-side: "No Frills"
- Released: 26 November 1990
- Length: 4:35
- Label: Mushroom
- Songwriter(s): Jimmy Barnes
- Producer(s): Don Gehman

Jimmy Barnes singles chronology
"Let's Make It Last All Night" (1990)	"Little Darling" (1990)	"When Your Love Is Gone" (1991)

"Little Darling" is a single by Australian rock musician Jimmy Barnes. It was released on 26 November 1990 as the third single from his fourth studio album, Two Fires. The song peaked at number 39 on the Australian Singles Chart.

== Track listing ==
7-inch single

- Side A "Little Darling"
- Side B "No Frills"

== Charts ==
Chart (1991)	Peak position
Australia (ARIA)	39
