= Stone Cold (Jimmy Barnes song) =

Single by Jimmy Barnes

from the album Heat
- B-side: "Stone Cold" (live)
- Released: May 1993
- Genre: Pop, rock
- Length: 3:46
- Label: Mushroom Records
- Songwriter: Don Walker
- Producer: Don Gehman

Jimmy Barnes singles chronology
"Stand Up" (1993)	"Stone Cold" (1993)	"Right by Your Side" (1993)

"Stone Cold" is a song recorded by Australian rock musician, Jimmy Barnes. It was released in May 1993 as the third single from Barnes' sixth studio album, Heat.

== Details ==
The song, written by Cold Chisel songwriter and keyboardist Don Walker, was the first time that Barnes had collaborated with former members of Cold Chisel since the band's demise.

Barnes said, "When Ian Moss played guitar on it in the studio, it was all so Chisel-esque that it made the hairs stand up on the back of our necks when we played it back. You tend to forget how great a songwriter Don Walker is until you sing his songs."

Don Walker had been the main songwriter in Cold Chisel, and Barnes had requested his contribution. Barnes said, "Now, let me clarify that it wasn't exactly the first time. I had asked Don for help in the past but he hadn't responded."

=== 30:30 Hindsight version ===
Barnes re-recorded the song in a harder, blues rock style with American guitarist Joe Bonamassa for Barnes' 2014 album 30:30 Hindsight.

== Track listing ==
CD Single

1. Stone Cold 3:46
2. Stone Cold (Live) 4:18
3. Wheels in Motion 3:20

CD/ Cassette Maxi

1. Stone Cold
2. Stand Up (Live)
3. Stone Cold (Live)
4. Catch Your Shadow (Acoustic)
5. Stone Cold (Acoustic)
6. Working Class Man (Acoustic)

== Charts ==
=== Weekly charts ===
Chart (1993)	Peak position
Australia (ARIA)	4
New Zealand (Recorded Music NZ)	14

=== Year-end charts ===
Chart (1993)	Position
ARIA Singles Chart	22
Australian Artist Singles Chart	2

=== Sales and certifications ===
Region	Certification	Certified units/sales
Australia (ARIA)	Platinum	70,000^{^}
^{^} Shipments figures based on certification alone.
