= Driving Wheels =

Single by Jimmy Barnes

from the album Freight Train Heart
- Released: January 1988
- Recorded: 1987
- Label: Mushroom
- Songwriters: Jimmy Barnes; Jonathan Cain; David Roberts
- Producers: Jonathan Cain, Mike Stone, Lobby Loyde

Jimmy Barnes singles chronology
"Too Much Ain't Enough Love" (1987)	"Driving Wheels" (1988)	"I'm Still on Your Side" (1988)

"Driving Wheels" is a song by Australian rock singer, Jimmy Barnes. It was released in January 1988 as the second single from Barnes' third studio album, Freight Train Heart. The song peaked at number 12 in Australia while reaching No. 19 on the New Zealand Singles Chart.

== Track listing ==
7" single (K 488) /12" single (X 13308)'

- Side A "Driving Wheels" - 5:19
- Side B "Different Lives" - 3:36

== Music video ==
A music video was produced to promote the single.

== Charts ==
Chart (1988)	Peak position
Australia (Kent Music Report)	12
New Zealand (Recorded Music NZ)	19

== Certifications ==
Certifications for "Driving Wheels"
Region	Certification	Certified units/sales
New Zealand (RMNZ)	Platinum	30,000^{‡}
^{‡} Sales+streaming figures based on certification alone.
