= Freight Train Heart =

Studio album by Jimmy Barnes
- Released: 13 November 1987
- Studios: Power Station (New York City); Rhinoceros (Sydney, Australia)
- Genre: Hard rock
- Length: 43:02
- Label: Mushroom
- Producers: Jonathan Cain; Mike Stone; Desmond Child

Jimmy Barnes chronology
For the Working Class Man (1985)	Freight Train Heart (1987)	Barnestorming (1988)

Singles from Freight Train Heart
- 1. "Too Much Ain't Enough Love" Released: October 1987; 2. "Driving Wheels" Released: January 1988; 3. "I'm Still on Your Side" Released: March 1988; 4. "Waitin' for the Heartache" Released: July 1988

Professional ratings
Review scores
Source	Rating
AllMusic	4.5/5 stars
Kerrang!	5/5 stars

Freight Train Heart is the third studio album by Australian rock singer, Jimmy Barnes, released in November 1987 in Australia by Mushroom Records and in early 1988 in the United States by Geffen. It spent 5 weeks at the top of the Australian Album charts in December 1987 and January 1988.

== Details ==
Most of the tracks were written by Barnes and one of the producers, Jonathan Cain, however "Waitin' for the Heartache" was co-written by Barnes and Desmond Child and "Walk On" was co-written by Child and ex-Rainbow vocalist Joe Lynn Turner; (Turner would later record his own version with his band Sunstorm). Two songs were also written with Jim Vallance. According to Vallance, Cain also contributed "later", most likely during the recording process.

"Seven Days" was a Ronnie Wood track originally written for him by Bob Dylan. This was the last song recorded for the album, and features INXS drummer Jon Farriss, bassist Chris Bailey and Rick Brewster from The Angels, although, at the time, Bailey was not an active member of The Angels. Brewster, Johnny Diesel, Peter Kekell and The Angels' Jim Hilbun were all hired after Barnes returned with the uncompleted master tapes from the initial recording sessions at the Power Station in New York City, where he had fought for creative control with both Cain and Geffen Records. The album was completed at Rhinoceros Studios in Sydney with Mike Stone producing. However the liner notes of the 1987 Mushroom album release compared to the Geffen album version release in 1988 reveal that a part of the album's songs had been additionally modified between the two releases at Right Track Studios, Hit Factory & A&R Studios. As an example the song Waitin' for the Heartache is slightly different on both album versions. Other guests to contribute include Huey Lewis, who provides backing vocals and harmonica on "I Wanna Get Started With You", Wendy Matthews and David Glen Eisley of the melodic hard rock band Giuffria.

Ian Moss was booked to play on the album, but pulled out. Barnes said, "He was supposed to but he chickened out. He is so worried about living up to this legendary status of Cold Chisel. He thought people might compare it and he might come out looking worse."

== Track listing ==
1. "Driving Wheels" (Jimmy Barnes, Jonathan Cain, David Roberts) - 5:16
2. "Seven Days" (Bob Dylan) - 3:23
3. "Too Much Ain't Enough Love" (Barnes, Cain, Neal Schon, Randy Jackson, Tony Brock) - 4:44
4. "Do or Die" (Barnes, Cain) - 3:51
5. "Waitin' for the Heartache" (Barnes, Desmond Child) - 4:34
6. "Last Frontier" (Barnes, Cain) - 5:29
7. "I Wanna Get Started with You" (Barnes, Cain, Schon) - 3:46
8. "I'm Still on Your Side" (Barnes, Jim Vallance, Cain) - 4:00
9. "Lessons in Love" (Barnes, Vallance, Jeff Neill, Cain) - 3:45
10. "Walk On" (Child, Joe Lynn Turner) - 4:14

== Personnel ==
- Jimmy Barnes - vocals
- Neal Schon, Johnny Diesel, Rick Brewster, John McCurry - guitar
- Randy Jackson, Chris Bailey, Jim Hilbun, Seth Glassman - bass
- Tony Brock, Jon Farriss, Jerry Marotta - drums
- Jonathan Cain, Peter Kekell, Gregg Mangiafico - keyboards, piano
- Chuck Kentis - synthesizer
- Ian Moss - zither
- Huey Lewis - harmonica
- David Lindley - steel guitar
- Jimmy Barnes, Huey Lewis, Wendy Matthews, David Glen Eisley, Johnny Diesel, Dave Amato, Lynette Stephens, Jim Hilbun, Walter Hawkins, Shaun Murphy, Venetta Fields, Joe Lynn Turner - backing vocals

Technical

- Mastering Engineer - Rick O’Neil Festival Records Australia

== Chart positions ==
Weekly chart performance for Freight Train Heart
Chart (1987/88)	Peak position
Australian (Kent Music Report)	1
Canadian Albums Chart	86
New Zealand Albums Chart	5
Swedish Albums Chart	24
US Billboard 200	104

=== Year-end charts ===
Year-end chart performance for Freight Train Heart
Chart (1988)	Position
Australian Albums (ARIA)	3
New Zealand Albums (RIANZ)	19

== Certifications ==
Region	Certification	Certified units/sales
Australia (ARIA)	5× Platinum	350,000^{^}
New Zealand (RMNZ)	Platinum	15,000^{^}
^{^} Shipments figures based on certification alone.

== See also ==
- List of number-one albums in Australia during the 1980s
