= Too Much Ain't Enough Love =

Single by Jimmy Barnes

from the album Freight Train Heart
- Released: October 1987
- Recorded: 1987
- Genre: Rock
- Label: Mushroom/Geffen
- Songwriter(s): Jimmy Barnes; Jonathan Cain; Neal Schon; Randy Jackson; Tony Brock
- Producer(s): Jonathan Cain

Jimmy Barnes singles chronology
| "Good Times" (1986) | "Too Much Ain't Enough Love" (1987) | "Driving Wheels" (1988) |

"Too Much Ain't Enough Love" is a song by Australian rock singer, Jimmy Barnes. It was released in October 1987 as the first single from Barnes' 1987 album, Freight Train Heart. It was his first Australian No. 1 hit single and reached No. 4 on the New Zealand Singles Chart. In the United States it was issued in the following year, which peaked at No. 91 on the Billboard Hot 100 in July 1988. It featured back-up vocals by Venetta Fields (who often performed back-up for both Barnes and John Farnham), as well as Wendy Matthews, who later found acclaim as a solo singer.

== Reception ==
In a Cash Box magazine review, they said "He's been called the Australian Bruce Springsteen, and this great cut proves it. He's got a phenomenal rock voice. Great song".

== Track listing ==
7" single (K-424)

- Side A "Too Much Ain't Enough Love" - 3:35
- Side B "Do or Die" - 3:47

12" single (X 14519)

- Side A "Too Much Ain't Enough Love" - 4:35
- Side B1 "Lessons In Love" - 3:43
- Side B2 "Working Class Man" (live) - 4:11

== Music video ==
A music video was filmed in Hong Kong with local actors.

== Charts ==
=== Weekly charts ===
| Chart (1987) | Peak position |
|---|---|
| Australia (Australian Music Report) | 1 |
| New Zealand (Recorded Music NZ) | 4 |

=== Year-end charts ===
| Chart (1987) | Position |
|---|---|
| Australia (Australian Music Report) | 44 |

== Cover versions ==
In 2012 a cover version of the song was released by Joe Bonamassa on his album Driving Towards the Daylight, with Jimmy Barnes again singing the lead vocals
