= The Most (The Cruel Sea album) =

Greatest hits album by The Cruel Sea
- Released: November 1999
- Length: 78:24
- Label: Polydor /Universal Music Australia

The Cruel Sea chronology
Over Easy (1998)	The Most (1999)	Where There's Smoke (2001)

The Most subtitled (The Best of The Cruel Sea) is the first greatest hits by Australian indie rock band The Cruel Sea. The album was released in November 1999 and peaked at number 43 the ARIA Charts. The album was certified gold in 2001.

== Track listing ==
No.	Title	Writer(s)	Length
1.	"It Won't Last"	Tex Perkins; Dan Rumour	3:22
2.	"Hard Times"	Jim Elliot; Perkins; Rumour	3:43
3.	"13th Floor"	The Cruel Sea	2:40
4.	"Takin' All Day"	Elliot; Ken Gormley; Perkins; Rumour	3:31
5.	"Better Get a Lawyer"	James Cruickshank; Gormly; Perkins; The Rumour	3:01
6.	"Too Fast for Me"	The Cruel Sea	2:55
7.	"Three Legged Dog"	Cruickshank; Gormly; Perkins; The Rumour	2:55
8.	"Anybody But You"	Perkins	3:59
9.	"Orleans Stomp"	Rumor	2:46
10.	"The Honeymoon Is Over"	Cruickshank; Perkins; Rumour	3:08
11.	"Black Stick"	Perkins; Rumour	5:00
12.	"Naked Flame"	Cruickshank; Perkins; Rumour	4:13
13.	"Delivery Man"	Cruickshank; Perkins; Rumour	5:09
14.	"Let's Lay Down Here and Make Love"	Perkins; Rumour	3:43
15.	"It's Alright (Cause She Loves Me)"	Perkins; Rumour	4:22
16.	"Don't Sell It"	Perkins; Rumour	4:58
17.	"This Is Not the Way Home"	Perkins; Rumour	4:08
18.	"4"	Rumour	3:14
19.	"I Feel"	Perkins; Rumour	3:21
20.	"Down Below"	Elliot; Perkins; Rumour	3:15
21.	"Deadwood"	Perkins; Rumour	3:18
22.	"Navigate"	Elliot; Rumour	1:46

== Charts ==
Chart (2001)	Peak position
Australian Albums (ARIA)	43

== Certification ==
Region	Certification	Certified units/sales
Australia (ARIA)	Gold	35,000^{^}
^{^} Shipments figures based on certification alone.

== Release history ==
Country	Date	Format	Label	Catalogue
Australia	November 1999	CD	Polydor Records / Universal Music Australia	5476572
