= List of Bohemian Rhapsody cover versions =

The song "Bohemian Rhapsody", written by Freddie Mercury and originally recorded by rock band Queen for their album A Night at the Opera, has been covered by many different artists.

== List ==
Year	Artist	Notes
1987	Fuzzbox	On their 1987 single "What's The Point"
1987	Bad News	This spoof rock band (created for the UK Channel 4 TV series The Comic Strip Presents...) also released "Bohemian Rhapsody" as a single. It reached number 44 in the UK Singles Chart. It featured on the album Bad News. The cover version was produced by Brian May. A 12-inch version was released as well ending completely different, when during the last guitar break a false chord is played and the song stops while someone shouts "fuck bastards, I played the wrong chord". The 12-inch version then continues with some studio chatter and a "bad news version" of "Pretty Woman".
1988	Elaine Paige	The Queen album
1990	Cud	On the anti-poll tax compilation album Alvin Lives (In Leeds).
1992	Queen + Elton John and Axl Rose	Elton John and Axl Rose performed "Bohemian Rhapsody" in The Freddie Mercury Tribute Concert. This version showed John playing the first verse of the ballad section in keyboards, and later singing in the front stage accompanied by Brian May, John Deacon and Roger Taylor (Spike Edney plays the rest of the vamp until the operatic section). After the taped Opera section, Axl Rose appeared using a microphone similar that Mercury used in his live concerts; the Outro section was played in duet showing Rose's appreciation to John.
1993	"Weird Al" Yankovic	A polka cover named "Bohemian Polka" on his album, Alapalooza.
1993	Comic Relief	A parody of the original video by celebrities from major UK TV networks on the BBC telethon
1995	The Cruel Sea	From the album Rock'n Roll Duds.
1995	Dream Theater	The album A Change of Seasons features the live track "The Big Medley", a cover song medley that includes a segment of "Bohemian Rhapsody."
1996	Rolf Harris	This version reached the British charts for one week at #50
1996	The Braids	High School High soundtrack album. See section
1996	Magic Affair	Released as a single and as part of the Queen Dance Traxx I compilation.
1997	Montserrat Caballé with Bruce Dickinson	On album Friends For Life
1998	Molotov	As "Rap, Soda y Bohemia", on the album Molomix
1998	Faye Wong	Performed the song on her concert - Faye Wong Scenic Tour 1998–99.
2001	Ours	Released as a limited edition CD single
2001	Paul de Leeuw	Dutch singer and TV personality, performed the song during his live shows in Ahoy Stadium in Rotterdam in 2000, released on single and album (Zingen terwijl u wacht). The performance however was rather poor and falsely sung.
2004	Carolina Crown	Drum & Bugle Corps performed as the closer for their "Bohemia!" show.
2004	Valensia	Released his Queen Tribute album with "Bohemian Rhapsody" on it.
2005	Side A	Live album Side A Gig (All Hits Live).
2005	Grey DeLisle	Album Iron Flowers. A shortened rendition, covering only the ballad portion of the song to a much slower melody.
2005	The Flaming Lips	Album Killer Queen. The cover was also performed live.
2005	Constantine Maroulis	Album Killer Queen. With the cast of We Will Rock You.
2005	Edgar Cruz	DVD Arranging for Solo Guitar / The Queen Titles.
2005	G4	First performed on first series of The X-Factor, released as a single which became #9 in the UK charts. It was included on their self-titled album
2005	Suzie McNeil	On the CBS reality show Rock Star: INXS
2005	Children in Need	A selection of BBC News presenters perform the song on the BBC telethon
2007	CollegeHumor	A parody entitled, "Brohemian Rhapsody", set in a fraternity house
2007	Moymoy Palaboy	A lip-syncing rendition of the song.
2007	Newton Faulkner	An acoustic cover of the song. YouTube.
2008	Emilie Autumn	Recorded on the Girls Just Wanna Have Fun & Bohemian Rhapsody Double Feature EP and frequently performed live in concert.
2008	Rajaton	Recorded on the Rajaton sings Queen with Lahti Symphony Orchestra and on several occasions performed live in concert.
2009	The Muppets	see section
2009	Pink	Funhouse Tour, and subsequent DVD release
2010	Prince Poppycock	On America's Got Talent
2010	Jonathan Groff in Glee	Featured on the TV show in the episode "Journey", and released on the EP Glee: The Music, Journey to Regionals
2010	Never Shout Never	From the album Punk Goes Classic Rock
2010	Hayseed Dixie	From the album Killer Grass
2010	Jake Shimabukuro	A ukulele instrumental version from the album Peace Love Ukulele
2011	William Shatner	From the album Seeking Major Tom
2011	Pato Fu	From the album Música de Brinquedo Ao Vivo
2011	Carolina Crown	Drum & Bugle Corps reprised their 2004 performance for their "Rach Star" show.
2012	Jessica Sanchez	On the American Idol season 11 Top 6 performance show
2012	Dalagita	X Factor Indonesia audition
2012	The Protomen	From the album Present: A Night of Queen
2012	Between The Buried And Me	As part of an encore of their 2012 European tour with Periphery and The Safety Fire; the band played after the tapped operatic section to the end before playing "Mordecai"
2013	Puscifer	From the EP Donkey Punch the Night
2013	Florent Mothe	From the album Rock in Chair
2014	The Forest Rangers feat. The White Buffalo, Billy Valentine & Franky Perez	A cover for the premiere episode of Season 7 of Sons of Anarchy, plays when the protagonist, Jax Teller tortures and kills an innocent man whom he believes is the murderer of his wife.
2014	Shun Ng	On solo acoustic guitar in a fingerstyle arrangement released on YouTube that was tweeted out by Brian May.
2015	Kanye West	Performed the song at the Glastonbury Festival.
2015	Lake Street Dive	Performed the song for their annual Halloween video. They said "Happy HallowQueen!!!! Here's our version of BOOhemian Rhapsody!".
2015-16	Between the Buried and Me	Performed the song as an encore at many shows on The Coma Ecliptic Tour and recorded the song for a 7-inch vinyl release which included Queen-inspired artwork on the sleeve.
2016	Billy Watman	Sky Arts TV channel released a trailer for the 2nd series of Guitar Star of 14-year-old Billy Watman playing "Bohemian Rhapsody" on classical guitar - the video was an internet sensation with over 9 million views.
2016	Saara Aalto & Adam Lambert	Performed as Aalto's celebrity duet choice during the first night of the two-part season finale of The X Factor UK.
2016	Panic! at the Disco	see section
2017	Pentatonix	Performed a capella for their extended play PTX, Vol. IV - Classics
Date Unknown	Mnozil Brass	Performed live a mix of playing instruments and a cappella
2017	Eretz Nehederet	As summarizing the Hebron shooting incident by the soldier El'or Azaria, the Israeli satire show made a parody cover on "Bohemian Rhapsody" starting with "mamma, I killed a man" in Hebrew. "Politicians" (actors) sing their opinions, as Binyamin Netanyahu, Zehava Gal'on, etc.
2018	Connie Talbot	An acoustic cover of the song, also piano accompaniment by the singer. YouTube.
2018	Marc Martel	From the Queen covers album, Thunderbolt & Lightning. Martel also uploaded a live one-take piano performance to YouTube. Martel regularly covered "Bohemian Rhapsody" as the lead singer of the Queen Extravaganza from 2012 to 2016, and with The Ultimate Queen Celebration from 2016 to present. Martel's vocals can be heard during the composition of "Bohemian Rhapsody" during the 2018 biographical film Bohemian Rhapsody.
2019	Toshi	On his cover album, Im a Singer Vol. 2. Titled "ボヘミアン・ラプソディ".
2019	Forestella (포레스텔라)	A cover of this song was released on their 2019 album, Mystique
2019	Adam Lambert & Dimitrius Graham	On the American Idol season 17 finale performance.
2020	Angelina Jordan	In her first appearance in the second season of America's Got Talent: The Champions, she was singing an original arrangement of the song. Besides stunning the judges, the performance also garnered praise from Queen's official Twitter account, after being aired in early January 2020. Jordan released two weeks later a studio version of the same arrangement under her own copyright.
2020	The Petersens	Bluegrass cover
2022	The Wiggles	From the album, ReWiggled
2024	Marco Misciagna	Single: "Bohemian Rhapsody", Arranged for Viola Solo by Marco Misciagna (Live) - MM04, 2024
2025	Sam Ryder	Recorded for BBC Radio 2's Piano Room on 30 October 2025 for the original song's 50th anniversary

== The Braids version ==
"Bohemian Rhapsody"

Single by the Braids

from the album High School High: The Soundtrack
- Released: 1 October 1996
- Genre: R&B; jeep-funk
- Length: 4:00
- Label: Big Beat; Atlantic; TriStar Music
- Songwriter: Freddie Mercury
- Producers: Stephan Jenkins; Eric Valentine

The Braids singles chronology
"Bohemian Rhapsody" (1996)	"Young Americans" (1998)

San Francisco Bay Area duo the Braids recorded an R&B version of "Bohemian Rhapsody" for the soundtrack to the Jon Lovitz movie High School High. It was released as their debut single in October 1996 and became a hit in Europe and New Zealand. The accompanying music video was directed by Marcus Nispel.

=== Release ===
The song was produced by Third Eye Blind's lead singer Stephan Jenkins with Eric Valentine and was released as a single in October 1996. It peaked at number 21 in United Kingdom and number 42 on the US Billboard Hot 100, staying on the latter chart for 17 weeks. In New Zealand, the song reached number two for four nonconsecutive weeks and achieved platinum status for sales of over 10,000. In Europe, the song was a top-20 hit in several regions, including Scandinavia, Italy and the Netherlands.

=== Critical reception ===
Larry Flick from Billboard magazine described The Braids' version as a "surprisingly potent jeep-funk rendition of the Queen classic", and stated further that "if you let go of everything connected to the original recording and give yourself to this interpretation, you will discover an often poignant street commentary as told from the viewpoint of a young woman." He also added that "the problem is that many may have a difficult time digesting the new concepts tied to this well-worn rocker." Jeremy Helligar from Entertainment Weekly wrote that "stripping 'Bohemian Rhapsody' down to an insistent shuffle beat, assorted piano fills, and soulful vocals, they create a sound so moving that you might want to reach out and hug the speakers." Alan Jones from Music Week named it "the most obvious contender" from the High School High soundtrack. He noted that "attacking it from a wholly different angle to Rolf Harris, they give it the kind of makeover that wouldn't disgrace Fugees. Likely to attract a lot of attention." Bönz Malone for Vibe called it a "soaring" remake.

=== Music video ===
The music video for "Bohemian Rhapsody" was directed by German director Marcus Nispel.

=== Track listing ===
CD single, UK and Europe (1996)
No.	Title	Length
1.	"Bohemian Rhapsody" (Radio Mix)	4:00
2.	"Bohemian Rhapsody" (Stripped-Down Mix)	3:57
3.	"Bohemian Rhapsody" (Instrumental)	4:01
4.	"Bohemian Rhapsody" (A Cappella)	3:51

CD single, Japan (1996)
No.	Title	Length
1.	"Bohemian Rhapsody" (Original Version)	3:55
2.	"Bohemian Rhapsody" (Remix Version)	3:26
3.	"Bohemian Rhapsody" (Acoustic Version)	3:12
4.	"Bohemian Rhapsody" (Stripped-Down Mix)	3:57
5.	"Bohemian Rhapsody" (Instrumental)	4:01
6.	"Bohemian Rhapsody" (A Cappella)	3:47

=== Charts ===
==== Weekly charts ====
Weekly chart performance for the Braids cover
Chart (1996–1997)	Peak position
Australia (ARIA)	62
Belgium (Ultratop 50 Flanders)	28
Belgium (Ultratop 50 Wallonia)	7
Canada (Nielsen SoundScan)	12
Canada Dance/Urban (RPM)	10
Europe (Eurochart Hot 100)	18
France (SNEP)	13
Germany (GfK)	72
Iceland (Íslenski Listinn Topp 40)	9
Italy (Musica e dischi)	3
Italy (TV Sorrisi e Canzoni)	3
Italy Airplay (Music & Media)	3
Netherlands (Dutch Top 40)	18
Netherlands (Single Top 100)	15
New Zealand (Recorded Music NZ)	2
Norway (VG-lista)	7
Scottish Singles Sales (Official Charts)	53
Sweden (Sverigetopplistan)	5
Switzerland (Schweizer Hitparade)	34
UK Singles (Official Charts)	21
UK Dance (Official Charts)	9
UK Hip Hop/R&B (Official Charts)	1
UK Pop Tip Club Chart (Music Week)	39
US Billboard Hot 100	42
US Hot R&B Singles (Billboard)	45
US Maxi-Singles Sales (Billboard)	20
US Top 40/Rhythm-Crossover (Billboard)	14
US Cash Box Top 100	47

==== Year-end charts ====
1996 year-end chart performance for the Braids cover
Chart (1996)	Position
Iceland (Íslenski Listinn Topp 40)	10
Italy (Musica e dischi)	86
New Zealand (RIANZ)	50
Sweden (Topplistan)	61
US Top 40/Rhythm-Crossover (Billboard)	71

1997 year-end chart performance for the Braids cover
Chart (1997)	Position
Belgium (Ultratop 50 Wallonia)	53
Europe (Eurochart Hot 100)	71
France (SNEP)	65
Italy (Musica e dischi)	37
Sweden (Topplistan)	78

=== Certifications ===
Region	Certification	Certified units/sales
France (SNEP)	Gold	250,000^{*}
New Zealand (RMNZ)	Platinum	10,000^{*}
Norway (IFPI Norway)	Gold	
^{*} Sales figures based on certification alone.

=== Release history ===
Region	Date	Format(s)	Label(s)	Ref(s).
United States	17 September 1996	Rhythmic contemporary; contemporary hit radio	Big Beat; Atlantic; TriStar Music	
United States	1 October 1996	12-inch vinyl; CD; cassette	Big Beat; Atlantic; TriStar Music	
United Kingdom	14 October 1996	12-inch vinyl; CD; cassette	Big Beat; Atlantic; TriStar Music	
Japan	21 December 1996	CD	Big Beat; Atlantic; EastWest Japan	

== The Muppets version ==
"Bohemian Rhapsody (Muppets Version)"

Single by Queen and the Muppets
- Released: 23 November 2009
- Recorded: 2009
- Genre: Rock, comedy rock
- Length: 4:46
- Label: Walt Disney
- Songwriter: Freddie Mercury
- Producers: Roy Thomas Baker, Queen

Queen singles chronology
"Another One Bites the Dust (The Miami Project Remixes)" (2006)	"Bohemian Rhapsody (Muppets Version)" (2009)	"Keep Yourself Alive (Long-Lost Retake)" (2011)

Music video
- "Bohemian Rhapsody - Muppet Music Video" on YouTube

The song was covered by the Muppets characters in 2009. A music video was posted on YouTube on 23 November 2009, before the release of the track, and features Muppets characters singing partially modified lyrics of the original song. It garnered over seven million hits within its first week of release. Unlike other cover versions, the Muppets' single features the final master of Queen's original 1975 recording. It was later followed with a commentary video, featuring Kermit the Frog and Gonzo, posted on 27 April 2010.

The video and song is an official production of The Muppets Studio. After the viral success of the video, Walt Disney Records released the cover as a single on 13 December 2009, where it peaked at #32 on the UK Singles Chart.

=== Video ===
The Muppets' version of "Bohemian Rhapsody" was directed by Kirk Thatcher, who has been involved with several other Muppets videos. According to studio manager Lylle Breier, the idea of the Muppets singing "Bohemian Rhapsody" had long been an idea that they wanted to do, but only was able to bring the project together within a short time before the video's release. Thatcher noted they had a long list of possible songs they wanted to do with a large group of Muppets, including Don McLean's "American Pie", but "Bohemian Rhapsody" was their ultimate selection. Filming was completed within a day by 20 staffers; Thatcher considered the task to be "epic in scale" considering they normally only use half a dozen Muppets for a single scene. Breier stated that this and other videos that Disney released to YouTube are part of a promotional push for the Muppets; Breier likened outlets on the Internet like YouTube to the variety shows of the 1970s, and felt that the Muppets easily fit into that culture.

The video is a montage by about 70 different Muppets characters singing their part of the lyrics against a black screen, in the same style used by Queen for portions of their promotion video of the song as well as mimicking the four-person layout used for the cover of Queen's second album. After completing the song, which ends up with mosaic of all the characters singing, it is revealed that this was one side of a computer video conference with Kermit the Frog, who laments his decision for that type of meeting to Scooter.

The video presents an abridged version of Queen's song with some lyric alterations to retain the appropriateness of the characters for a family audience. For example, within the first stanza of the ballad portion of the song, the lyrics where the singer laments to his mother that he "just killed a man" are replaced by Animal calling out repeatedly for "mama". Other aspects of the lyrics are changed for humorous purposes surrounding the Muppets characters. Pepe the King Prawn starts the opera portion of the song stating that he sees "a little silhouetto of a clam". The back-and-forth lyrics, "Bismillah! No! We will not let you go...let him go!", are replaced with Fozzie Bear begging "Let me joke" to Statler and Waldorf, who state "[We] do not like your jokes". The line "Beelzebub has a devil put aside for me" is replaced with the remaining Muppets who have not been in the video singing "Does anyone know if there is a part for me?" The first two lines of the hard rock section, here performed by Dr. Teeth and the Electric Mayhem, have been replaced with "So they tell us this video's going to fly, all I know is we're not getting paid tonight!" The song ends with Miss Piggy, lounging on Rowlf the Dog's piano, singing "Nothing really matters but moi!"

The video premiered on YouTube on 23 November 2009. Within a week, the video had accrued over 7 million views, and has nearly 15 million views within the following five months. The video was nominated and won the "Viral Video" category in the 14th Annual Webby Awards. For New Year's Eve at Disneyland, the video was projected onto the Fantasmic! mist screens in-between performances, and in place of an extra midnight performance. The performance also utilized the show's various laser effects and lighting towers working in tandem with the video.

The song would later be performed as the act two opener for the Muppets' 2017 & 2018 live shows "The Muppets take the Bowl" and "The Muppets take the O2" featuring an additional choir and guest star Bobby Moynihan.

=== Queen personnel ===
- Freddie Mercury — piano, occasional backing vocals
- Brian May — electric guitar
- Roger Taylor — drums, percussion
- John Deacon — bass guitar

=== Muppet performers ===
- Steve Whitmire — Kermit the Frog, Rizzo the Rat, Beaker, Statler, The Newsman, Chicken, Bunny, Penguin, Snowth, Turkey, Flowers, Cactus, Monkey
- Dave Goelz — The Great Gonzo, Dr. Bunsen Honeydew, Waldorf, Zoot, Beauregard, Frackle, Penguins, Rat, Cactus, Monkey
- Eric Jacobson — Miss Piggy, Fozzie Bear, Animal, Sam the Eagle, Snowth, Chicken, Frackle, Penguin, Prairie Dog
- Bill Barretta — Pepé the King Prawn, Rowlf the Dog, Dr. Teeth, Swedish Chef, Old Tom, Bobo the Bear, Johnny Fiama, Mahna Mahna, Big Mean Carl, Rat, Flowers, Cactus, Monkey, Prairie Dog
- David Rudman — Scooter, Janice, Yolanda the Rat, Rat, Penguins, Monkey, Prairie Dog
- Matt Vogel — Camilla the Chicken, Floyd Pepper, Angel Marie, Crazy Harry, Sal Minella, Dr. Julius Strangepork, Lew Zealand, Rat, Flowers, Cactus, Monkey, Prairie Dog

== Panic! at the Disco version ==
"Bohemian Rhapsody"

Song by Panic! at the Disco

from the album Suicide Squad: The Album
- Released: 4 August 2016
- Studio: Abbey Road Studios
- Length: 6:01
- Label: Atlantic; Warner Bros.
- Songwriter: Freddie Mercury
- Producer: Butch Walker

Music video
- "Bohemian Rhapsody" (live from the Death of a Bachelor Tour) on YouTube

American pop rock band Panic! at the Disco covered the song as part of their set list for several concert tours, including The Gospel Tour, Summer Tour 2016, the Death of a Bachelor Tour, and the Pray for the Wicked Tour. The song was officially recorded for Suicide Squad: The Album (2016), the soundtrack album for the 2016 film, and premiered on 4 August 2016 on the Beats 1 radio station. In addition, a recording of the song performed on tour was included on the track listing of the live album All My Friends We're Glorious (2017). The band performed "Bohemian Rhapsody" at the Qudos Bank Arena in Sydney, Australia, during the American Music Awards of 2018 in promotion of the 2018 biopic.

Although the song was not released as a single, it made six charts after it came out. The song hit number 64 on the US Billboard Hot 100 and the Australian Singles Chart. It also hit number 159 on the SNEP charts in France, number 80 on the UK singles chart, number 47 on the Hot Canadian Digital Songs, and the US Hot Rock & Alternative Songs. On the year-end charts, the song fell down to number 45 on the Hot Rock & Alternative Songs chart. The cover was certified gold by the Recording Industry Association of America (RIAA) on 12 June 2018.

== "Weird Al" Yankovic version ==
In 1993, comedy musician "Weird Al" Yankovic released a cover of "Bohemian Rhapsody" titled "Bohemian Polka" on his album Alapalooza. Unlike traditional covers that attempt to recreate the song's rock opera style, Yankovic reinterpreted the entire piece as an upbeat, accordion-driven polka.

The song preserves Freddie Mercury's original lyrics and structure, but it is arranged with typical polka instrumentation, including accordion, tuba, and clarinet, driven by a fast oompah beat. This transforms the serious and dramatic tone of the original into a lighthearted, comedic performance, in keeping with Yankovic's style.

"Bohemian Polka" stands out in Yankovic's catalog because it is a full-length cover of a single song, whereas most of his polka tracks are medleys of various pop hits. Though it was not released as a single, the song became a fan favorite and is frequently cited in discussions of unconventional or humorous interpretations of classic rock songs.

The track showcases Yankovic's ability to reimagine complex compositions within a contrasting genre, highlighting both his musicianship and comedic approach.

=== Weekly charts ===
Chart (2016–17)	Peak position
Australian Singles Chart (ARIA)	64
Canada (Hot Canadian Digital Songs)	47
France (SNEP)	159
UK Singles (Official Charts)	80
US Billboard Hot 100	64
US Hot Rock & Alternative Songs (Billboard)	7

=== Year-end charts ===
Chart (2016)	Position
US Hot Rock Songs (Billboard)	45

=== Certifications ===
Region	Certification	Certified units/sales
United States (RIAA)	Gold	500,000^{‡}
^{‡} Sales+streaming figures based on certification alone.
