= Honeymoon Is Over =

Honeymoon Is Over may refer to:

- The Honeymoon Is Over, an album by The Cruel Sea, 1993
  - "The Honeymoon Is Over" (song), a song from the album
- Honeymoon Is Over, an album by Lodger (Finnish band), 2008
- "Honeymoon Is Over", an alternative title for the song "Backdrifts" by Radiohead from Hail to the Thief, 2003

== See also ==
- The Honeymoon's Over (disambiguation)
