= Just a Man =

Just a Man may refer to:

- "Just a Man (The Cruel Sea song)", 1995
- "Just a Man", 2002 song by Mark Morrison from Innocent Man (Mark Morrison album)
- "Just a Man", 1995 song by Faith No More from King for a Day... Fool for a Lifetime
- "Just a Man", the second song in Epic: The Musical by Jorge-Rivera Herrans
- "Just a Man" (Flashpoint episode), a season 2 episode
- Just a Man: The Real Michael Hutchence, 2000 biography by Tina Hutchence and Patricia Glassop

== See also ==
- "Am I Just a Man", 2010 song by Steve Mason
- I'm Just a Man, 1997 song by INXS from Elegantly Wasted
- Just Like a Man, 1992 song recorded by Lill Lindfors
- One Just Man (disambiguation)
