= The Honeymoon Is Over =

Studio album by the Cruel Sea
- Released: 31 May 1993
- Recorded: September 1992 – February 1993
- Studios: Planet Studios, Perth, Australia
- Genre: Indie rock
- Length: 46:55
- Labels: Red Eye; Polydor
- Producers: The Cruel Sea; Tony Cohen; Mick Harvey

The Cruel Sea chronology
This Is Not the Way Home (1991)	The Honeymoon Is Over (1993)	Three Legged Dog (1995)

Singles from The Honeymoon Is Over
- 1. "Black Stick" Released: March 1993; 2. "The Honeymoon Is Over" Released: July 1993; 3. "Woman with Soul" Released: October 1993; 4. "Seems Twice" Released: February 1994

The Honeymoon Is Over is the third studio album by Australian indie rock band The Cruel Sea, which was released in May 1993. The album was produced by the band, Tony Cohen and Mick Harvey for Red Eye Records. It peaked at No. 4 on the ARIA Albums Chart and has sold over 140,000 copies. Its lead single, "Black Stick" was released ahead of the album in March 1993 and peaked at No. 25 on the related Singles Chart. The title song, "The Honeymoon Is Over", was released in July 1993 as a single and reached the Top 50. It was followed by a cover of Tony Joe White's 1969 song, "Woman with Soul", in October which peaked at No. 64. The final single from the album, "Seems Twice", was issued in February 1994 and peaked at No. 90.

In 1994, the band won five ARIA Awards: 'Single of the Year' and 'Song of the Year' for "The Honeymoon Is Over"; 'Album of the Year', 'Best Group' and 'Producer of the Year' for The Honeymoon Is Over. The album’s liner notes details “For Lulamay”, Gormly’s daughter.

== Background ==
The Cruel Sea was formed in late 1987 in Sydney by Jim Elliot on drums and Dan Rumour (aka Daniel Atkins) on guitar. By late 1988, Ken Gormly had joined on bass guitar and James Cruickshank on keyboards and guitars. In 1989, the band invited vocalist Tex Perkins, also a member of Beasts of Bourbon, to join them on-stage. The group signed with Red Eye Records and released their debut album, Down Below, in December. Their second album, This Is Not the Way Home was issued in December 1991.

The Honeymoon Is Over was produced by the band, Tony Cohen (The Birthday Party, Beasts of Bourbon) and Mick Harvey (Robert Forster, Anita Lane) of Nick Cave and the Bad Seeds. Released in May 1993, it peaked at No. 4 on the ARIA Albums Chart, and sold over 140,000 copies.

Late in 1994, the group toured Europe, again supporting Nick Cave and the Bad Seeds. They followed with a headlining tour across Europe and to Canada. On the Triple J Hottest 100, 1993, three tracks from The Honeymoon Is Over appeared, "The Honeymoon Is Over" at No. 9, "Black Stick" (No. 21) and "Delivery Man" (No. 95).

== Recording ==
Initial recordings were done with just Rumour and Cruickshank. Cohen said, "Danny had a vision for the album. The Cruel Sea sounded like a cross between Beasts of Bourbon and a slick pop group. That was difficult because Tex wanted it tough and Danny wanted sweet guitar sounds."

Perkins said, "We put the album down over three, one-week sessions, which is the longest we've ever taken to do it. If I spend too much time in the studio I get bored — desensitised. It's like I have nothing more to offer. But the actual recording was very easy — it's when you're mixing that it becomes microscopic — studying each sound. That doesn't flow so easily." Cohen agreed, "Tex was never interested in the technical stuff and didn't want it explained. One night he'd had enough and threw a control room chair at me."

== Reception ==
Professional ratings
Review scores
Source	Rating
AllMusic	4/5 stars

AllMusic's Tom Demalon said the album "blends organic, rootsy instrumentation with clever, well-written lyrics to produce an album that is a joy from start to finish". Randy Krbechek of Metronews was impressed, "[It] is a treat. From the instrumental tracks (such as the North African-influenced "Orleans Stomp" and the pop-rock, "Seems Twice") to rock cuts like "Better Than Love" and "Black Stick", The Cruel Sea delivers the goods".

Reviewed in Rolling Stone Australia at the time of the release, it was said that the album differed from the band's previous releases because of the Cajun feel that permeated the album. Tony Cohen's production was particularly praised. The music was described as, "part Elvis Sun Sessions guitar twang, part Booker T-inspired instrumental groove, part Tom Waits percussive and lyrical growl, and a lot of Southern American country influence à la Tony Joe White's "Polk Salad Annie".

== Accolades ==
At the ARIA Music Awards of 1994, The Cruel Sea won 'Single of the Year' and 'Song of the Year' for "The Honeymoon Is Over", 'Album of the Year', 'Best Group' and 'Producer of the Year' (Tony Cohen) for The Honeymoon Is Over and received five further nominations including 'Best Cover Art' by Kristyna Higgins and Jay Manby. At an after-party, a drunken guest attacked Higgins, a professional photographer, and a fracas ensued with Perkins defending his partner. Also that night, two of their ARIA trophies were stolen.

In October 2010, The Honeymoon Is Over was listed in the book, 100 Best Australian Albums.

== Track listing ==
The Honeymoon Is Over track listing
No.	Title	Writer(s)	Length
1.	"Orleans Stomp"	Dan Rumour	2:47
2.	"The Honeymoon Is Over"	Tex Perkins; Rumour; James Watson	3:06
3.	"Delivery Man"	Perkins; Rumour; Watson	5:08
4.	"The Right Time"	Rumour	2:43
5.	"Black Stick"	Perkins; Rumour	4:58
6.	"Sly Din"	Rumour	3:07
7.	"Naked Flame"	Perkins; Rumour; Watson	4:11
8.	"Woman with Soul"	Tony Joe White	3:51
9.	"Seems Twice"	Rumour	2:49
10.	"Better than Love"	Perkins; Rumour	4:24
11.	"X-N-Pop"	Perkins; Rumour; Watson	3:36
12.	"Let's Lay Down Here & Make Love"	Perkins; Rumour; Watson	3:36
13.	"Blame It on the Moon"	Gene Thomas	3:38
Total length:			46:55

== Personnel ==
The Cruel Sea members

- Jim Elliott – drums, percussion
- Dan Rumour – guitars, percussion
- James Cruickshank – keyboards, guitar, backing vocals, percussion
- Ken Gormly – bass guitar, percussion
- Tex Perkins – vocals, harmonica, guitar

Additional musicians

- Geoff Hales – percussion
- Ross Hannaford – guitar
- Mick Harvey – tambourine, xylophone

Production details

- Producer – The Cruel Sea, Tony Cohen, Mick Harvey
- Mastering – Don Bartley
- Engineer – Tony Cohen
- Editing, sequencing – David Macquarie
- Studio – Metropolis and Atlantis (Melbourne)
  - Planet (Perth) – "Black Stick"

Art work

- Cover art – Kristyna Higgins, Jan Manby
  - Cover photo – Kristyna Higgins
  - Concept – Tex Perkins
  - Photography – Tex Perkins, Kristyna Higgins

== Charts ==
=== Weekly charts ===
Weekly chart performance for The Honeymoon Is Over
Chart (1993–1994)	Peak position
Australian Albums (ARIA)	4
New Zealand Albums (RMNZ)	33

=== Year-end charts ===
Year-end chart performance for The Honeymoon Is Over
Chart (1993)	Position
Australian Albums (ARIA)	40
Chart (1994)	Position
Australian Albums (ARIA)	39

== Certification ==
Certifications for The Honeymoon Is Over
Region	Certification	Certified units/sales
Australia (ARIA)	3× Platinum	210,000^{^}
^{^} Shipments figures based on certification alone.
