= 1994 ARIA Music Awards =

Annual Australian music awards

- Date: 30 March 1994
- Venue: State Theatre, Sydney, New South Wales

Highlights
- Most wins: The Cruel Sea (5)
- Most nominations: The Cruel Sea (10)
- Website: ariaawards.com.au

Television/radio coverage
- Network: Network Ten

The Eighth Australian Recording Industry Association Music Awards (generally known as the ARIA Music Awards or simply the ARIAs) was held on 30 March 1994 at the State Theatre in Sydney. Radio and TV personality Richard Stubbs hosted the ceremony and was assisted by presenters to distribute 26 awards.

In addition to previous categories, new categories for Best Alternative Release and Best Pop/Dance Release were presented for the first time. A Special Achievement Award was presented to former Go-Set music journalist and pioneer radio DJ, Stan Rofe. The ARIA Hall of Fame inducted Men at Work.

== Ceremony details ==
The Cruel Sea won five categories for their album The Honeymoon Is Over (1993) and its title track. According to Australian music journalist, Anthony O'Grady, they displayed "a churning rumble of swamp boogie, surf instrumentals and punk iconoclasm, not immediately radio's hottest wish list." Speculation that they would not turn up proved unfounded. The group's guitarist Dan Rumour finished an acceptance speech with, "The press said we'd clean up at tonight's awards, so you can help us by stacking the chairs and emptying the ashtrays as you leave." Newspapers reported the following day that, at an after-party, the band's lead singer Tex Perkins had been injured during a scuffle with a drunken guest and that, separately, two of the group's trophies had been stolen.

=== Presenters and performers ===
The ARIA Awards ceremony was hosted by TV personality Richard Stubbs. Presenters and performers were:

Presenter(s)	Performer(s)	Ref.
Agro	Peter Andre	
Magda Szubanski	Peter Andre	
Kate Ceberano	Peter Blakeley	
John Clarke, Bryan Dawe	Peter Blakeley	
Diesel, Deni Hines	d.i.g., Grace Knight	
Alex Dimitriades, Toni Pearen	d.i.g., Grace Knight	
Mick Doohan, Elle McFeast	Slim Dusty, Anne Kirkpatrick, Willie Nelson	
Peter Gabriel	Slim Dusty, Anne Kirkpatrick, Willie Nelson	
Gina Jeffreys, Willie Nelson	Tommy Emmanuel	
Jimeoin	Tommy Emmanuel	
k.d. lang	John Farnham, Richard Marx	
Wendy Matthews	John Farnham, Richard Marx	
Molly Meldrum	Hoodoo Gurus	
Don McLean	Hoodoo Gurus	
Urban Cookie Collective	Things of Stone and Wood	
Anthony Warlow	You Am I	

== Awards ==
Nominees for most awards are shown, in plain, with winners in bold.

=== ARIA Awards ===
- Album of the Year
  - **The Cruel Sea – The Honeymoon Is Over**
    - The Badloves – Get On Board
    - Crowded House – Together Alone
    - Diesel – The Lobbyist
    - John Farnham – Then Again...
- Single of the Year
  - **The Cruel Sea – "The Honeymoon Is Over"**
    - The Badloves – "Lost"
    - Jimmy Barnes – "Stone Cold"
    - Crowded House – "Distant Sun"
    - Diesel – "Never Miss Your Water"
- Highest Selling Album
  - **John Farnham – Then Again...**
    - Jimmy Barnes – Flesh and Wood
    - The Black Sorrows – The Chosen Ones
    - Wendy Matthews – Lily
    - The Seekers – The Silver Jubilee Album
- Highest Selling Single
  - **Peter Andre – "Gimme a Little Sign"**
    - Chocolate Starfish – "You're So Vain"
    - INXS – "The Gift"
    - Screaming Jets – "Shivers"
    - Things of Stone and Wood – "Happy Birthday Helen"
- Best Group
  - **The Cruel Sea – The Honeymoon Is Over**
    - Baby Animals – Shaved and Dangerous
    - Crowded House – Together Alone
    - INXS – Full Moon, Dirty Hearts
    - Midnight Oil – Earth and Sun and Moon
- Best Female Artist
  - **Wendy Matthews – "Friday's Child"**
    - Kate Ceberano – "You've Got a Friend"
    - Deborah Conway – Bitch Epic
    - Anne Kirkpatrick – "Game of Love"
    - Margaret Urlich – "Burnt Sienna"
- Best Male Artist
  - **Diesel – The Lobbyist**
    - Jimmy Barnes – Flesh and Wood
    - John Farnham – Then Again...
    - Tim Finn – Before & After
    - Tex Perkins – Sad But True
- Best New Talent
  - **The Badloves – Get On Board**
    - Robertson Brothers – I Know Why
    - Margot Smith – "Sleeping with the Lion"
    - Vincent Stone – Sunshine
    - Swoop – Thriller
- Breakthrough Artist – Album
  - **The Badloves – Get On Board**
    - Peter Andre – Peter Andre
    - Things of Stone and Wood – The Yearning
    - Tiddas – Sing About Life
    - The Sharp – This Is the Sharp
- Breakthrough Artist – Single
  - **The Badloves – "Lost"**
    - Chocolate Starfish – "You're So Vain"
    - Christine Anu – "Last Train"
    - D.I.G. – "Re-invent Yourself"
    - Vincent Stone – "Sunshine"
- Best Pop Release
  - **Peter Andre – Peter Andre**
    - Bellydance – One Blood
    - Girlfriend – It's Up to You
    - Toni Pearen – "I Want You"
    - Sound Unlimited – "One More from the City"
- Best Country Album
  - **Lee Kernaghan – Three Chain Road**
    - Graeme Connors – The Return
    - Slim Dusty – Ringer from the Top End
    - Anne Kirkpatrick – Game of Love
    - John Williamson – Love is a Good Woman
- Best Independent Release
  - **Ed Kuepper – Serene Machine**
    - The Jackson Code – Dragging the River
    - Juice – Movin' On
    - Dave Steel – Cross My Palm
    - Brenda Webb – Little Black Girl
- Best Alternative Release
  - **You Am I – "Sound As Ever"**
    - Clouds – Thunderhead
    - Crow – My Kind of Pain
    - The Cruel Sea – The Honeymoon Is Over
    - Dave Graney & the Coral Snakes – Night of the Wolverine
- Best Indigenous Release
  - **Tiddas – Sing About Life**
    - Kev Carmody – Bloodlines
    - Not Drowning, Waving – Circus
    - Archie Roach – Jamu Dreaming
    - Yothu Yindi – Freedom
- Best Adult Contemporary Album
  - **Tommy Emmanuel – The Journey**
    - James Blundell – Touch of Water
    - Grace Knight – Gracious
    - Rick Price & Margaret Urlich – "Where Is the Love?"
    - The Seekers – 25 Year Reunion Celebration
- Best Comedy Release
  - **Steady Eddy – Ready Steady Go**
    - Double Take – Hercules Returns
    - Rolf Harris – Rolf Rules OK
    - Jimeoin – Goin' Off
    - Doug Mulray – Nice Legs Shame About the Fez

=== Fine Arts Awards ===
- Best Jazz Album
  - **Mike Bukovsky – Wanderlust**
    - AtmaSphere – Flying
    - Judy Bailey – Sundial
    - The Catholics – The Catholics
    - Mike Nock – Touch
- Best Classical Album
  - **Dene Olding, Sydney Symphony Orchestra, Challender, Porcelijn – Ross Edwards Orchestral Works**
    - Australian Chamber Orchestra & Richard Tognetti – Mendelssohn: Octet in E Flat for Strings Op. 20 Sinfonia No. 9 in C. Swiss
    - Australian Chamber Orchestra & Richard Tognetti – Symphony Serenades and Suites
    - Nigel Butterley – John Cage
    - Dene Olding, Melbourne Symphony Orchestra, Iwaki – Violin Concertos
- Best Children's Album
  - **Mic Conway – Whoopee!**
    - Bananas in Pyjamas – Bananas in Pyjamas
    - Colin Buchanan – I Want My Mummy
    - Franciscus Henri – My Favourite Nursery Rhymes
    - Monica Trapaga – Monica's Tea Party
- Best Original Soundtrack / Cast / Show Recording
  - **Original Cast Recording – Hot Shoe Shuffle**
    - The Australian Opera, Giacomo Puccini – La Boheme
    - M. Easton, M. Atkins – Snowy Original Soundtrack
    - Carl Vine – Bedevil
    - John Waters, Lennon & McCartney – Looking Through a Glass Onion

=== Artisan Awards ===
- Song of the Year
  - **James Cruickshank, Tex Perkins, Dan Rumour – "The Honeymoon Is Over" (The Cruel Sea)**
    - James Cruickshank, Tex Perkins, Dan Rumour – "Black Stick" (The Cruel Sea)
    - Diesel – "Never Miss Your Water" (Diesel)
    - Neil Finn – "Distant Sun" (Crowded House)
    - Tim Finn – "Persuasion" (Tim Finn)
- Best Cover Art
  - **Pierre Baroni, Mushroom Art – Deborah Conway – Bitch Epic**
    - Kristyna Higgins, Jan Manby – The Cruel Sea – The Honeymoon Is Over
    - Marcelle Lunam – Things of Stone and Wood – The Yearning
    - Nick Seymour – Crowded House – Together Alone
    - Kevin Wilkins, Midnight Oil – Midnight Oil – Earth and Sun and Moon
- Best Video
  - **Richard Lowenstein – INXS – "The Gift"**
    - Andrew Dominik – The Cruel Sea – "The Honeymoon Is Over"
    - Paul Elliott – Midnight Oil – "Outbreak of Love"
    - Paul Elliott, Sally Bongers – Christine Anu & Paul Kelly – "Last Train"
    - Craig Griffin – John Farnham – "Seemed Like a Good Idea (At the Time)"
- Engineer of the Year
  - **Simon Hussey – Daryl Braithwaite – "Barren Ground", "The World as It Is"; – Company of Strangers – "Baby, You're a Rich Man", "Daddy's Gonna Make You a Star"**
    - Mark Forrester – Peter Andre – "Funky Junky", "Let's Get it On"; – Grant McLennan – "Lighting Fires", "Surround Me"
    - Nick Mainsbridge, Kalju Tonuma - The Sharp - "Scratch My Back", "Yeah I Want You", "Train of Thought"
    - Michael Letho – Daryl Braithwaite – "Barren Ground", "The World As it Is", "Breaking the Rules", "Look What Your Love Has Done"
    - Tony Cohen – The Cruel Sea – "The Honeymoon is Over"; – Tiddas – "Waiting"; – Dave Graney & the Coral Snakes – "You're Just Too Hip Baby"
- Producer of the Year
  - **Tony Cohen – The Cruel Sea – The Honeymoon Is Over**
    - Angelique Cooper – Christine Anu with Paul Kelly – "Last Train"; Neil Murray – "Holy Road" (Remix); Yothu Yindi – "World Turning" (Remix)
    - James Black – Things of Stone and Wood – "Rock This Boat", "Single Perfect Raindrop", "Heidelberg", "Barkley Street"
    - Joe Camilleri – The Black Sorrows – "Stir It Up", "Come on, Come On"
    - Johnny Diesel – Diesel – "I've Been Loving You Too Long", "Never Miss Your Water", "Masterplan"
    - Simon Hussey – Company of Strangers – "Baby, You're a Rich Man", "Daddy's Gonna Make You a Star";

== Special Achievement Award ==
- Stan Rofe

== ARIA Hall of Fame inductee ==
The Hall of Fame inductee was:

- Men at Work
