= LHK =

LHK may refer to:

- Larvik HK, Norwegian handball club
- The Lighthouse Keepers, Australian band
- Henk Krol List (Lijst Henk Krol), a Dutch political party
