= Bughouse (band) =

Australian musical group

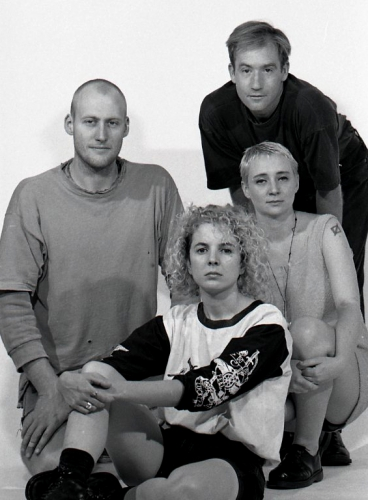
- Bughouse 1990. Left to right Steve Campbell, Genevieve Maynard, Peter Brookes, Lea Cameron.

Background information
- Origin: Sydney, Australia
- Genres: Indie rock
- Years active: 1989–1994
- Labels: Ursula, Mushroom
- Past members: Peter Brookes; Steve Campbell; Lea Cameron; Genevieve Maynard; Nick Fisher

Bughouse were an independent band from Sydney, who toured the East Coast of Australia from 1989 to 1994.

== History ==
=== 1989–1991: Formation and early period ===
Formed by drummer Peter Brookes in 1989 as a recording project, the original line-up was completed by Lea Cameron (vocals), Steve Campbell (guitar) and Genevieve Maynard (bass). Their first show was on Saturday 27 May 1989 at the Hopetoun Hotel, Surry Hills. In their first six months Bughouse played around Sydney, predominantly at the Hopetoun, Annandale, Lansdowne and Sandringham hotels, and at various university campuses.

Their debut single "V for Vendetta"/"Burn it Back" was produced by Damien Lovelock, lead singer of The Celibate Rifles and featured Louis Tillett of the Wet Taxis on piano. "V for Vendetta" was released on the band's own Ursula label, receiving high rotation on radio station Triple J and reaching number six on the Australian Independent Charts. ABC TV made a video of the song for an "undiscovered" section on weekly music show Rage. The band recorded their first Live at the Wireless for Triple J at ABC Studio 1 in Darlinghurst.

Bughouse returned to the studio some months later to record the Bughouse EP with engineer John Hresc at Powerhouse Studios. The EP included four tracks – "Tax Stamp", "Bruce's Song", "Salad Days" and "One More Thing". The EP reached number four on the Australian Independent Charts These two first records showcased the band's assured and eclectic sound.

After this early success, the band were courted by several major labels eventually signing a record deal with Mushroom Records' White Label.

The band's debut album, Every Fool in Town was recorded over ten days again with Lovelock producing and Tony Espie engineering. It included guest performances by Amanda Brown of the Go-Betweens and James Cruickshank of the Cruel Sea. The album received positive reviews, and reached number 1 on the Australian Independent Charts. A video was made for the single "Hell for Leather".

=== 1992–1994 Bardo and Fink Tank ===
For the rest of their career, Bughouse toured extensively around Australia, playing shows with many notable local and international bands, including Crowded House, the Hoodoo Gurus, Hunters & Collectors, Yothu Yindi, Concrete Blonde and Bob Dylan.

During the period between Every Fool in Town and Bardo, Peter Brookes left the band and was replaced by Nick Fisher (Wet Taxis, New Christs).

Bughouse recorded the EP Bardo in 1992. The name of the EP came from the Tibetan Book of the Dead, and referred to the limbo the band had been in as a result of record company indecision in moving their recording schedule ahead. The EP contained five tracks, and a video was made for the song "Brightest Firework".

After parting ways with Mushroom Records, a final album Fink Tank was released through Mushroom Distribution Services in 1994 to strong reviews, including by Rolling Stone magazine who described it as a "screaming surprise packet". The album was recorded by Tim Powles, and mixed by Paul McKercher. The band released a video for the album's second track "Fathom" and also appeared on ABC TV's Live & Sweaty.

Their final performance was on 4 October 1994 at the Annandale Hotel, Sydney.

== Discography ==
=== Albums and EPs ===
Release	Year	Label	type
Bughouse	1989	Ursula	EP
Every Fool in Town	1990	Ursula/Mushroom	Album
Bardo	1992	Ursula/MDS	EP
Fink Tank	1994	Ursula	Album

=== Singles ===
Release	Label	type	Year
"V for Vendetta"	Ursula Records	Single	1989
"V for Vendetta"	Ursula/Waterfront	Re-released / single	1989
"Somebody To Love"	Ursula/Mushroom	12" single	1990
