= This Is Not the Way Home (album) =

Studio album by the Cruel Sea
- Released: 28 October 1991
- Studio: Megaphon Studios
- Genre: Indie rock
- Length: 49:13
- Label: Red Eye, Polydor
- Producer: The Cruel Sea, Tony Cohen

The Cruel Sea chronology
Down Below (1989)	This Is Not the Way Home (1991)	The Honeymoon Is Over (1993)

Singles from This is Not the Way Home
- 1. "I Feel" Released: September 1991; 2. "4" Released: April 1992; 3. "This is Not the Way Home" Released: August 1992

This is Not the Way Home is the second studio album by Australian indie rock band the Cruel Sea. The album was released in October 1991 and peaked at number 62 on the Australian albums chart. With the release of This is Not the Way Home, the Cruel Sea embarked on a European tour supporting Nick Cave and the Bad Seeds.

At the ARIA Music Awards of 1993, the album earned the band a nomination for Best Group. Tony Cohen was nominated for Producer of the Year.

== Recording ==
The album was recorded at Megaphon Studios, near Sydney Airport. Producer Tony Cohen said, "The plan was for it to be a natural recording, with nothing too fancy. The studio had empty factory space, so I decided to use it as reverb chambers. Reverb on drums, vocals, backing vocals. Most times I managed to get my experiments right."

== Reception ==
This is Not the Way Home garnered critical acclaim. The music ranged from funky Louisiana swamp blues to sweet soul, with Perkins' laconic vocals recalling the spirit of Captain Beefheart, Tony Joe White and John Lee Hooker in the process.

The Canberra Times said the album was, "like a road movie soundtrack. It has the timelessness of David Lynch's Wild At Heart. It could be the '50s or the '90s. To the shimmering guitar melodies of "This is Not the Way Home", Perkins adds a visceral element - lines about shedding blood and skin, throwing up, and grunting, groaning, his guts as well as his emotions laid bare."

== Track listing ==
No.	Title	Writer(s)	Length
1.	"It's Alright ('Cause She Loves Me)"	Tex Perkins; Dan Rumour	4:21
2.	"Baby"	Perkins; Rumour	5:10
3.	"4"	Rumour	3:09
4.	"Sure 'Nuff"	Don Van Vliet; Herb Bermann	4:00
5.	"Don't Sell It"	Perkins; Rumour	5:20
6.	"Cry for Me"	James Cruickshank; Perkins; Rumour	5:23
7.	"Fangin' Hoons"	Rumour	2:17
8.	"This Is Not the Way Home"	Perkins; Rumour	3:58
9.	"Shadder"	Rumour	3:27
10.	"I Feel"	Perkins; Rumour	3:19
11.	"You Are Gone"	Perkins; Rumour	4:54
12.	"High Plains Drifter"	Rumour	3:45

== Charts ==
Chart (1992)	Peak position
Australian Albums (ARIA)	62

== Certification ==
Region	Certification	Certified units/sales
Australia (ARIA)	Platinum	70,000^{^}
^{^} Shipments figures based on certification alone.

== Release history ==
Country	Date	Format	Label	Catalogue
Australia	28 October 1991	CD, Cassette, LP	Red Eye Records	511161-2, REDCD 25
