= Looking Through a Glass Onion =

Australian stage show (1992)

Looking Through a Glass Onion is an Australian stage show starring John Waters as John Lennon. It was written by Waters, with musical director Stewart D'Arrietta and features songs written by Lennon. The show features Waters performing Lennon's songs, accompanied at early shows by D'Arrietta and later by a full band led by D'Arrietta, linked by a series of monologues spoken as Lennon.

Looking Through a Glass Onion opened at the Tilbury Hotel in Sydney on 18 March 1992 and has since toured nationally and internationally over many years, including in Australia again in 2011.

The soundtrack album was nominated for the ARIA Music Award for Best Original Soundtrack, Cast or Show Album in 1994.
