= The Honeymoon's Over =

The Honeymoon's Over may refer to:

- The Honeymoon's Over (film), a 1939 American comedy film
- "The Honeymoon's Over" (Charmed), an episode of the TV series Charmed
- "The Honeymoon's Over" (Will & Grace), an episode of the TV series Will & Grace

== See also ==
- Honeymoon Is Over (disambiguation)
