= Widdershins (band) =

1980s Australian indie band

Widdershins were an Australian indie pop band, active from 1987 to 1989. After The Lighthouse Keepers disbanded in early 1986, Greg Appel and Juliet Ward went on to form the Rainlovers which became Widdershins in 1987 with the addition of James Cruickshank, Peter Timmerman and Barry Turnbull (ex-John Kennedy's Love Gone Wrong).

Three years of sporadic playing around Australia to a small devoted following and four releases on vinyl earned them the respect of critics throughout the country.

Widdershins called it a day after a final performance on 30 March 1990 at Sydney University. James Cruickshank joined The Cruel Sea, while Greg Appel and his brother Steve gigged occasionally with Ward, Timmerman and others in a loose-knit outfit called Hammerhead, before forming the semi-regular group One Head Jet ca. 1992, playing in Sydney, Canberra, Melbourne and other towns until about 1997. The fluid lineup included Timmerman, Greg's youngest brother David (vocals, trumpet, percussion) and on occasion, in the latter stages of the band, guitarist Brendan Gallagher of Karma County. After the demise of One Head Jet, Steve Appel formed King Curly.

== Personnel ==
- Juliet Ward - vocals
- Greg Appel - guitar and vocals
- James Cruickshank - guitar and keyboards
- Barry Turnbull - bass
- Peter Timmerman - drums

== Discography ==
- Now You Know / Dishwashing Liquid single (Waterfront Records 1987)
- Bottleman's Wife EP (Waterfront Records 1988)
- Ascension LP (Waterfront Records 1989)
- Return of the King / Bugle Call single (Waterfront Records 1989)
- Good Songs retrospective CD (Egg Records 2006)
- Now You Know / Changeling / A Place in Time download single (Egg Records 2006)
