= Three Legged Dog =

Studio album by The Cruel Sea
- Released: April 1995
- Studio: Megaphon Studios, Rockinghorse Studios
- Genre: Indie rock
- Length: 48:10
- Label: Red Eye, Polydor
- Producer: The Cruel Sea, Tony Cohen, Paul McKercher

The Cruel Sea chronology
| The Honeymoon Is Over (1993) | Three Legged Dog (1995) | Rock'n Roll Duds - Best of the B-Sides (1995) |

Singles from Three Legged Dog
- 1. "Better Get a Lawyer" Released: November 1994; 2. "Just a Man" Released: March 1995; 3. "Anybody But You" Released: June 1995; 4. "Too Fast for Me" Released: September 1995

Three Legged Dog is the fourth studio album by Australian indie rock band The Cruel Sea. The album was released in April 1995 and peaked at number 1 on the ARIA Charts. The liner notes of the album lists “For Pandora”, Gormly's daughter, pictured in the liner notes.

At the ARIA Music Awards of 1995, the album was nominated for four awards; winning Best Group, Engineer of the Year for Tony Cohen and Paul McKercher's work, and Producer of the Year for Cohen's work.

Professional ratings
Review scores
| Source | Rating |
|---|---|
| Allmusic | 2/5 stars |

== Composition ==
Three Legged Dog was the first Cruel Sea album with writing contributions from all members of the band. Previously, most songs has originated from home demos recorded by Danny Rumour. Perkins said, "We have been playing together for so many years getting to know each other that creating music as a unit was a natural progression. It was a fresh way of doing things and made the creative process exciting again."

== Cover ==
The cover photo was taken by Kristyna Higgins, Perkins' partner. The dog, Molly, was owned by a friend of the band. Cruickshank said, "The most beautiful creature you've ever seen. She's a very proud creature, and looks the wiser for not having her other leg.

== Reception ==
The Sydney Morning Herald said, "The album marks a significant departure from the pop-inspired hooks and punchlines of The Honeymoon is Over, getting back to the harder-edged groove and rock sensibilities found on their earlier albums.

== Track listing ==
| No. | Title | Writer(s) | Length |
|---|---|---|---|
| 1. | "This Is What It Is" | James Cruickshank; Jim Elliott; Ken Gormly; Dan Rumour | 2:47 |
| 2. | "Just a Man" | Ken Gormley; Stephen Perkins | 4:02 |
| 3. | "Anybody But You" | Perkins | 3:57 |
| 4. | "Too Fast for Me" | The Cruel Sea | 2:54 |
| 5. | "Teach Me" | Cruickshank; Gormly; Perkins | 3:35 |
| 6. | "Hard Candy" | Rumour | 2:46 |
| 7. | "Too Late to Turn Back" | Perkins; Rumour | 3:10 |
| 8. | "Baby Meet" | Cruickshank; Elliott; Gormly; Perkins | 2:50 |
| 9. | "Save Me" | Cruickshank; Perkins | 3:49 |
| 10. | "Gimme Back My Thing" | Perkins; Rumour | 1:45 |
| 11. | "Better Get a Lawyer" | Cruickshank; Elliott; Gormly; Perkins; Rumour | 3:00 |
| 12. | "Brain Wash" | Cruickshank; Elliott; Gormly; Perkins | 2:58 |
| 13. | "Three Legged Dog" | Cruickshank; Elliott; Gormly; Rumour | 2:53 |
| 14. | "The Lot" | Gormly; Perkins; Rumour | 3:55 |
| 15. | "Strange Thing" | Rumour | 3:56 |

== Charts ==
=== Weekly charts ===
| Chart (1995) | Peak position |
|---|---|
| Australian Albums (ARIA) | 1 |
| New Zealand Albums (RMNZ) | 20 |

=== Year-end charts ===
| Chart (1995) | Position |
|---|---|
| Australian Albums (ARIA) | 40 |
| Australian Artist Albums (ARIA) | 3 |

== Release history ==
| Country | Date | Format | Label | Catalogue |
|---|---|---|---|---|
| Australia | April 1995 | CD, Cassette, LP | Red Eye Records | 527537-2, REDCD 50 |

== See also ==
- List of number-one albums in Australia during the 1990s
