= Triple J's Hottest 100 of 1993 =

Australian song chart in 1993

1993 Triple J Hottest 100
- Album artwork for the CD compilation

Countdown details
- Date of countdown: January 1994

Countdown highlights
- Winning song: Denis Leary "Asshole"
- Most entries: The Cruel Sea; Michael Stipe (3 tracks each)

Chronology
← Previous; 1991 (All Time)	Next → 1994

The 1993 Triple J Hottest 100, counted down in January 1994, was the inaugural countdown of the most popular songs of the year, according to listeners of the Australian radio station Triple J (as opposed to previous incarnations of the poll, where listeners could vote on any recorded song from any time in history); the change to make the countdown an annual poll was made after organisers realised that the poll's results were unlikely to significantly change from year to year. About 50,000 votes were counted for this countdown.

A double CD featuring 32 of the songs was released. This compilation was, and many of the ones to follow in future years were, some of the highest-selling CDs in Australia.

== Full list ==
Note: Australian artists

#	Song	Artist	Country of origin
1	Asshole	Denis Leary	United States
2	Creep	Radiohead	United Kingdom
3	Linger	The Cranberries	Ireland
4	No Rain	Blind Melon	United States
5	Cannonball	The Breeders	United States
6	Killing in the Name	Rage Against the Machine	United States
7	Lemon	U2	Ireland
8	Go	Pearl Jam	United States
9	The Honeymoon Is Over	The Cruel Sea	Australia
10	Stone Me into the Groove	Atomic Swing	Sweden
11	Everybody Hurts	R.E.M.	United States
12	Plush	Stone Temple Pilots	United States
13	Soul to Squeeze	Red Hot Chili Peppers	United States
14	I Held Her in My Arms	Violent Femmes	United States
15	Wild America	Iggy Pop	United States
16	Sister Havana	Urge Overkill	United States
17	Hits from the Bong	Cypress Hill	United States
18	Go West	Pet Shop Boys	United Kingdom
19	Trout	Neneh Cherry featuring Michael Stipe	Sweden/United States
20	Heart-Shaped Box	Nirvana	United States
21	Black Stick	The Cruel Sea	Australia
22	The Ship Song (Live)	Nick Cave & the Bad Seeds	Australia
23	Human Behaviour	Björk	Iceland
24	What's Up?	4 Non Blondes	United States
25	Feed the Tree	Belly	United States
26	Somewhere	Efua	Ghana/United Kingdom
27	Sober	Tool	United States
28	Are You Gonna Go My Way	Lenny Kravitz	United States
29	All That She Wants	Ace of Base	Sweden
30	Constant Craving	k.d. lang	Canada
31	Numb	U2	Ireland
32	Jessie	Paw	United States
33	Pets	Porno for Pyros	United States
34	Cantaloop (Flip Fantasia)	Us3	United Kingdom
35	Shoop	Salt-N-Pepa	United States
36	The Right Time	Hoodoo Gurus	Australia
37	My Sister	The Juliana Hatfield Three	United States
38	Get Me	Dinosaur Jr.	United States
39	Friday I'm in Love	The Cure	United Kingdom
40	Push th' Little Daisies	Ween	United States
41	World Turning	Yothu Yindi	Australia
42	Dreams	Gabrielle	United Kingdom
43	Cherub Rock	The Smashing Pumpkins	United States
44	Juice	Headless Chickens	New Zealand
45	Start Choppin	Dinosaur Jr.	United States
46	Detachable Penis	King Missile	United States
47	Tease Me	Chaka Demus & Pliers	Jamaica
48	Night of the Wolverine	Dave Graney 'n' the Coral Snakes	Australia
49	Bi	Living Colour	United States
50	Adam's Ribs	You Am I	Australia
51	Would?	Alice in Chains	United States
52	Runaway Train	Soul Asylum	United States
53	Taillights Fade	Buffalo Tom	United States
54	Holy Grail	Hunters & Collectors	Australia
55	Alive and Brilliant	Deborah Conway	Australia
56	Can You Forgive Her?	Pet Shop Boys	United Kingdom
57	Choppers	Headless Chickens	New Zealand
58	Jesus Was Way Cool	King Missile	United States
59	You're Just Too Hip, Baby	Dave Graney 'n' the Coral Snakes	Australia
60	Distant Sun	Crowded House	Australia
61	Last Train	Christine Anu and Paul Kelly	Australia
62	Easy	Faith No More	United States
63	Scratch My Back	The Sharp	Australia
64	Nearly Lost You	Screaming Trees	United States
65	Regret	New Order	United Kingdom
66	Something Good	Utah Saints	United Kingdom
67	Boom Shack-A-Lak	Apache Indian	United Kingdom
68	Mr. Vain	Culture Beat	Germany
69	Animal Nitrate	Suede	United Kingdom
70	Sleepy Head (Serene Machine)	Ed Kuepper	Australia
71	Nothingness	Living Colour	United States
72	Baby (You Got in the Way)	Barefoot	Australia
73	Mr. Wendal	Arrested Development	United States
74	Ain't No Love (Ain't No Use)	Sub Sub featuring Melanie Williams	United Kingdom
75	The Drowners	Suede	United Kingdom
76	Before	Caligula	Australia
77	Lost	The Badloves	Australia
78	Deep	East 17	United Kingdom
79	Mrs. Robinson	The Lemonheads	United States
80	Rooster	Alice in Chains	United States
81	Insane in the Brain	Cypress Hill	United States
82	Green Limousine	The Badloves	Australia
83	Your Eyes	Underground Lovers	Australia
84	Bullet in the Head	Rage Against the Machine	United States
85	Three Little Pigs	Green Jellÿ	United States
86	World (The Price of Love)	New Order	United Kingdom
87	Do It	Swoop	Australia
88	Dixie Drug Store	Grant Lee Buffalo	United States
89	Aboriginal Woman	Mixed Relations	Australia
90	For Tomorrow	Blur	United Kingdom
91	Happy Birthday Helen	Things of Stone and Wood	Australia
92	I Feel You	Depeche Mode	United Kingdom
93	Man on the Moon	R.E.M.	United States
94	Sweat (A La La La La Long)	Inner Circle	Jamaica
95	Delivery Man	The Cruel Sea	Australia
96	Candy Everybody Wants	10,000 Maniacs	United States
97	Rubberband Girl	Kate Bush	United Kingdom
98	Freedom	Kev Carmody	Australia
99	Ebeneezer Goode	The Shamen	United Kingdom
100	Gloria	Van Morrison and John Lee Hooker	Ireland/United States

== Statistics ==
=== Artists with multiple entries ===
#	Artist	Tracks
3	The Cruel Sea	9, 21, 95
3	Michael Stipe (Note: Twice with R.E.M. (11, 93), Once with Neneh Cherry (19))	11, 19, 93
2	Rage Against the Machine	6, 84
2	U2	7, 31
2	R.E.M.	11, 93
2	Cypress Hill	17, 81
2	Pet Shop Boys	18, 56
2	Dinosaur Jr.	38, 45
2	Headless Chickens	44, 57
2	King Missile	46, 58
2	Dave Graney 'n' the Coral Snakes	48, 59
2	Living Colour	49, 71
2	Alice in Chains	51, 80
2	New Order	65, 86
2	Suede	69, 75
2	The Badloves	77, 82

=== Countries represented ===
Nation	Total
United States	46
Australia	24
United Kingdom	19
Ireland	4
Sweden	3
Jamaica	2
New Zealand	2
Canada	1
Germany	1
Ghana	1
Iceland	1

=== Records ===
- "The Ship Song" by Nick Cave and the Bad Seeds charted in the Hottest 100 for the second time after a live version of the track featured at No. 22, the studio version charted at No. 14 in the 1991 countdown.
- As of the 2024 Hottest 100, John Lee Hooker at 76, is the oldest person to appear in the countdown.

== CD release ==
Triple J Hottest 100: The Hottest of the Hottest

Compilation album by Various artists
- Released: 6 October 1994; 31 May 2004 (Reissue)
- Genre: Alternative
- Labels: Triple J, ABC Music, EMI; Universal (Reissue)

=== Disc one ===
No.	Title	Artists	Length
1.	"Asshole" (1)	Denis Leary	4:28
2.	"Creep" (2)	Radiohead	3:56
3.	"Linger" (3)	The Cranberries	4:34
4.	"Cannonball" (5)	The Breeders	3:35
5.	"Stone Me Into the Groove" (10)	Atomic Swing	4:04
6.	"Plush" (12)	Stone Temple Pilots	4:21
7.	"I Held Her In My Arms" (14)	Violent Femmes	3:01
8.	"Wild America" (15)	Iggy Pop	5:45
9.	"Sister Havana" (16)	Urge Overkill	3:50
10.	"Black Stick" (21)	The Cruel Sea	5:00
11.	"The Ship Song (Live)" (22)	Nick Cave and the Bad Seeds	4:22
12.	"Human Behaviour" (23)	Björk	4:12
13.	"Feed the Tree" (25)	Belly	3:27
14.	"Sober" (27)	Tool	5:06
15.	"All That She Wants" (29)	Ace of Base	3:33
16.	"Numb" (31)	U2	4:20
Total length:			1:07:34

=== Disc two ===
No.	Title	Artists	Length
1.	"Jessie" (32)	Paw	3:16
2.	"Pets" (33)	Porno for Pyros	3:27
3.	"Cantaloop (Flip Fantasia)" (34)	Us3	3:42
4.	"The Right Time" (36)	Hoodoo Gurus	3:52
5.	"My Sister" (37)	Juliana Hatfield	3:24
6.	"Get Me" (38)	Dinosaur Jr.	5:50
7.	"Push th' Little Daisies" (40)	Ween	2:52
8.	"World Turning" (41)	Yothu Yindi	3:51
9.	"Dreams" (42)	Gabrielle	3:40
10.	"Cherub Rock" (43)	The Smashing Pumpkins	4:58
11.	"Juice" (44)	Headless Chickens	4:00
12.	"Detachable Penis" (46)	King Missile	3:22
13.	"Night of the Wolverine" (48)	Dave Graney 'n' the Coral Snakes	4:45
14.	"Adam's Ribs" (50)	You Am I	3:56
15.	"Taillights Fade" (53)	Buffalo Tom	3:46
16.	"Alive and Brilliant" (55)	Deborah Conway	4:02
Total length:			1:02:43

Replacements

In 2004, the album was reissued by Universal Music Australia. The reissue removed "Asshole" and replaced 5 of the songs from the original release with different songs. They are:

- "Linger" is replaced with "Trout" by Neneh Cherry and Michael Stipe
- "Sober" is replaced with "Friday I'm in Love" by The Cure
- "All That She Wants" is replaced with "Animal Nitrate" by Suede
- "My Sister" is replaced with "I Feel You" by Depeche Mode
- "Push th' Little Daisies" is replaced with "World (The Price of Love)" by New Order

== See also ==
- 1993 in music
