= Where There's Smoke (The Cruel Sea album) =

Studio album by The Cruel Sea
- Released: September 2001
- Length: 50:46
- Label: Polydor /Universal Music Australia
- Producer: Magoo, The Cruel Sea

The Cruel Sea chronology
The Most (1999)	Where There's Smoke (2001)	We Don't Work, We Play Music (2002)

Singles from Where There's Smoke
- 1. "A Simple Goodbye" Released: 2001; 2. "No Choice" Released: 2001

Where There's Smoke is the sixth studio album by Australian indie rock band The Cruel Sea. The album was released in September 2001 and peaked at number 25 the ARIA Charts. It would be their final album until 2025's Straight Into the Sun.

== Reception ==
Nell Schofield from ABC said "The Cruel Sea began its life as an experimental instrumental surf band but when Tex Perkins joined in 1989, he brought a whole new image to the group, and a grungy, swamp country sound. The bands' new album Where There's Smoke demonstrates a more laid back sound, written, as it was, on the front porch of Perkins' rural retreat near Mullumbimby." Mark Fraser from Red Back Rock called the album "as laid back as it gets." Fraser said "The fact that there was no pressure involved in the making of this album is evident from go to woe, as each lazy journey just peels off ever so effortlessly."

== Track listing ==
No.	Title	Writer(s)	Length
1.	"The Man With the Horn"	The Cruel Sea	3:45
2.	"No Choice"	Tex Perkins, Charlie Owen, Joel Silbersher	4:00
3.	"Daylight"	The Cruel Sea	3:45
4.	"I Don't Worry Anymore"	Perkins, Ken Gormly, Jim Elliott, James Cruickshank	3:55
5.	"There's a Chicken in the House"	The Cruel Sea	3:09
6.	"A Simple Goodbye"	Perkins, Gormly	3:36
7.	"She Got Soul"	Perkins, Dan Rumour	4:37
8.	"Like I Like It"	The Cruel Sea	2:54
9.	"Cocaine"	Dillinger	3:49
10.	"Slo Down"	Perkins, Rumour	4:06
11.	"It Won't Last"	The Cruel Sea	3:17
12.	"Million $ Ho"	Perkins, Cruickshank	3:36
13.	"Coming for You"	Perkins, Rumour, Carmen	4:54
14.	"The Floater"	Rumour	1:39

== Charts ==
Chart (2001)	Peak position
Australian Albums (ARIA)	25

== Release history ==
Country	Date	Format	Label	Catalogue
Australia	September 2001	CD	Polydor Records / Universal Music Australia	0147962
