= Over Easy =

Studio album by The Cruel Sea
- Released: July 1998
- Studio: Q Studios, Sydney; Paradise Studios, Woolloomooloo, Sydney; Rockinghorse Studios, Byron Bay
- Length: 49:47
- Label: Polydor
- Producer: Daniel Denholm, Phillip McKellar, The Cruel Sea

The Cruel Sea chronology
Rock'n Roll Duds - Best of the B-Sides (1995)	Over Easy (1998)	The Most (1999)

Singles from Over Easy
- 1. "Hard Times" Released: February 1998; 2. "Takin' All Day" Released: June 1998; 3. "You'll Do" Released: 1998

Over Easy is the fifth studio album by Australian indie rock band The Cruel Sea. The album was released in July 1998 and peaked at number 13 the ARIA Charts. The album was supported with a "Takin' All Day" national tour.

== Reception ==
Professional ratings
Review scores
Source	Rating
Allmusic	3/5 stars

Stewart Mason from AllMusic said "The Cruel Sea have adopted a songwriting style based on slowly evolving layers of loops and samples, with an increased interest in reggae and other world music styles to boot. The Thin Lizzy-like folk-metal of "Hard Times" and the Beck-inspired wonky groove of "13th Floor" in particular reveal appealing new sides to the band. The lazy, summery vibe of the single "Taking All Day" is more traditional Cruel Sea fare, with singer Tex Perkins more to the forefront than he is on the rest of the album. Dismissed by some longtime fans as a misguided experiment, Over Easy is actually a most intriguing album that shows off the group's strengths in new and interesting ways."

== Track listing ==
No.	Title	Writer(s)	Length
1.	"The Charmer"	Perkins, Gormly, Elliott
2.	"Runnin'"	Perkins, Gormly, Elliott
3.	"Hard Times"	Perkins, Cruikshank, Rumour, Elliott
4.	"13th Floor"	The Cruel Sea
5.	"Takin' All Day"	Perkins, Rumour, Gormly, Elliott
6.	"You'll Do"	Perkins, Rumour, Gormly, Elliott
7.	"Welcome"	Rumour, Perkins
8.	"Only Falling Water"	Cruikshank, Gormly, Rumour, Perkins
9.	"Unending Thing"	Perkins, Gormly, Elliott
10.	"Down On Me"	Perkins, Elliott
11.	"Daytona"	Perkins, Gormly, Elliott
12.	"Seaman's Lament"	Perkins, Gormly, Elliott
13.	"This Time of Year"	Perkins, Cruikshank, Denholme

=== Personnel ===
The Cruel Sea

- Tex Perkins — lead and backing vocals; melodica (tracks 1, 12), bass (tracks 3, 10), Hammond organ (track 5), lead guitar (tracks 11, 13)
- Dan Rumour — guitars
- James Cruikshank — keyboards, backing vocals, guitars; lead vocals (track 6), bass (track 13)
- Ken Gormly — bass (tracks 1, 2, 4-9, 11, 12), guitar (track 2)
- Jim Elliott — drums, percussion

Additional Personnel

- Daniel Denholm — backing vocals (track 6)
- Justine Clarke — backing vocals (track 6)
- Loene Carmen — backing vocals (track 6)
- Monica McMahon — backing vocals (track 6)
- Glad Reed — trombone (track 7)
- Diane Spence — saxophone (track 9)
- Jeff Crawley — trumpet (track 9)
- Amanda Brown — strings (track 13), string arrangement (track 13)
- Laura McCrow — strings (track 13), string arrangement (track 13)
- M Lindsay — strings (track 13), string arrangement (track 13)
- Michelle Kelly — strings (track 13), string arrangement (track 13)

== Charts ==
Chart (1998)	Peak position
Australian Albums (ARIA)	13

== Release history ==
Country	Date	Format	Label	Catalogue
Australia	July 1998	CD	Polydor Records	557174-2
