= Vincent Stone =

Australian singer

- Also known as: Vincent Stone McManus; Mark McManus
- Born: Australia
- Occupation: Singer
- Instrument: Vocals

Vincent Stone is an Australian singer. He was signed after impressing Sony Music while playing showcase gigs at Les Girls. His single "Sunshine" saw him nominated at the 1994 ARIA Music Awards for Best New Talent and Breakthrough Artist – Single. The single peaked at number 109 on the ARIA chart.

Stone moved into acting and had roles in Superman Returns and Love My Way before playing a lead role in the Australian thriller The Backpacker.

Stone is also known for being the model for the character of Strelok (Marked One) in the videogame S.T.A.L.K.E.R.: Shadow of Chernobyl.

== Discography ==
=== Studio albums ===
List of studio albums with selected details and chart positions
Title	Details	Peak chart positions
Title	Details	AUS
Vincent Stone	Released: April 1994; Label: Columbia (474291 2); Format: CD	65

=== Singles ===
List of singles
Title	Year	Album
"Sunshine"	1992	Vincent Stone
"Best of My Love"	1993	Vincent Stone
"Girls"	1994	Vincent Stone

== Awards and nominations ==
=== ARIA Music Awards ===
The ARIA Music Awards is an annual awards ceremony that recognises excellence, innovation, and achievement across all genres of Australian music. They commenced in 1987.

Year	Nominee / work	Award	Result	Ref.
1994	"Sunshine"	Best New Talent	Nominated	
1994	"Sunshine"	Breakthrough Artist - Single	Nominated	

== Filmography ==
Year	Title	Role	Notes
2004	The Crop	Dago	
2006	Superman Returns	Grant	
2011	The Backpacker	Vincent Malek	
