= Black Stick =

1993 single by the Cruel Sea

Single by the Cruel Sea

from the album The Honeymoon Is Over
- B-side: "High Sheriff of Calhoun Parish"; "Momma Killed a Chicken"; "Crab Stick"
- Released: 14 March 1993
- Studio: Planet (Perth, Australia)
- Length: 4:58
- Label: Red Eye
- Songwriters: Tex Perkins; Dan Rumour
- Producers: Tony Cohen; Mick Harvey; The Cruel Sea

The Cruel Sea singles chronology
"This Is Not the Way Home" (1992)	"Black Stick" (1993)	"The Honeymoon Is Over" (1993)

"Black Stick" is a song by Australian rock band the Cruel Sea. It was released in March 1993 as the lead single from the band's third studio album, The Honeymoon Is Over, and peaked at number 25 on the Australian Singles Chart. At the ARIA Music Awards of 1994, the song was nominated for Best Song, losing to band's following single, "The Honeymoon Is Over". "Black Stick" was ranked at number 21 on the Triple J Hottest 100 of 1993, the second-highest placing by an Australian act for that year, after "The Honeymoon Is Over".

== Background ==
Producer Tony Cohen said, "I was mixing the same song for three days, perfecting it, and it worked. It was a hit. They [later] said, 'Sorry, now we understand what you were trying to do.' I was just trying to make it so radio friendly, they had to play it, and it worked. The apologies were gracefully accepted."

== Reception ==
Reviewed in Australian rock magazine Juke at the time of release, it was claimed that, "Adding a syncopated rhythm groove to their already stunning, subtle, string-driven post-spaghetti-western soundscape, this unique musical entity continue their evolution into excellence." The Age called it, "a rap-surf gem." Woroni said the song "swaps Tex's usually aggressive sexual persona for an ambiguous, possibly auto-erotic tour over his body (legs like towers, heart as a muscle etc). Meanwhile, the band's usual lean guitar lines are fleshed out with a semi-Latin twist and a swinging rhythm which makes them sound like the house band at the Copacabana. This, by the way, is a compliment."

== B-sides ==
One song on the B-side, "Crab Stick", is an instrumental version of the A-side. "High Sheriff of Calhoun Parish" is a cover of a Tony Joe White song that spent 18 weeks in the Australian charts in 1970. "Momma Killed a Chicken" is John Lee Hooker's arrangement of a traditional blues song most commonly known by the title "Bottle Up and Go". Both covers were produced by The Cruel Sea and Brett Stanton, who was the assistant engineer on the main song.

== Track listing ==
1. "Black Stick"
2. "High Sheriff of Calhoun Parish"
3. "Momma Killed a Chicken"
4. "Crab Stick"

== Charts ==
Chart (1993)	Peak position
Australia (ARIA)	25
