= Rock'n Roll Duds =

Compilation album by The Cruel Sea
- Released: November 1995
- Genre: Indie rock
- Length: 56:23
- Label: Red Eye, Polydor

The Cruel Sea chronology
| Three Legged Dog (1995) | Rock'n Roll Duds (1995) | Over Easy (1998) |

Rock'n Roll Duds (subtitled The Best of the B Sides) is the first compilation album by Australian indie rock band The Cruel Sea. The album was released in November 1995 and peaked at number 40 on the ARIA Charts.

== Reception ==
The Canberra Times said, "If there was ever any doubt that The Cruel Sea is not just very cool, but also very "musically sound", then this collection of B-sides will erase it. The album is loosely-formatted, and a bit tongue-in-cheek. What it lacks by way of polished production it makes up for with bump and-grind blues and camp fire music."

== Track listing ==
| No. | Title | Writer(s) | Length |
|---|---|---|---|
| 1. | "Cool It Down" | Lou Reed | 3:47 |
| 2. | "Down the Stairs Backwards" | The Cruel Sea | 2:47 |
| 3. | "Delivery Man" (demo) | Perkins, Rumour, Cruickshank | 5:23 |
| 4. | "Blue Dog" | Cruickshank | 4:08 |
| 5. | "Moby Dick" | John Bonham, Jimmy Page, John Paul Jones | 4:10 |
| 6. | "High Sheriff of Calhoun Parish" | Tony Joe White | 4:39 |
| 7. | "Victoria's Lament" | Elliott, Gormly, Cruickshank, Rumour | 1:13 |
| 8. | "Bohemian Rhapsody" | Freddie Mercury | 3:07 |
| 9. | "Everybody's Talkin'" | Fred Neil | 3:38 |
| 10. | "Cabbage Tree Creek" | Perkins, Rumour, Gormly, Elliott | 1:57 |
| 11. | "Momma Killed the Chicken" | John Lee Hooker | 2:31 |
| 12. | "Looks Like It's Gonna Rain" | The Cruel Sea | 2:07 |
| 13. | "Manic Depression" | Jimi Hendrix | 2:42 |
| 14. | "Copper's Waltz" | Elliott, Gormly, Cruickshank, Rumour | 2:08 |
| 15. | "See Ya Later" | Perkins, Rumour | 3:47 |
| 16. | "Delilah" | Lyrics: Traditional, Music: Perkins | 8:23 |

== Charts ==
| Chart (1995) | Peak position |
|---|---|
| Australian Albums (ARIA) | 40 |

== Release history ==
| Country | Date | Format | Label | Catalogue |
|---|---|---|---|---|
| Australia | November 1995 | CD | Red Eye Records, Polydor Records | REDCD 54, 5295002 |
