= Present: A Night of Queen =

Live album by The Protomen
- Released: June 1, 2012
- Recorded: December 10, 2010 at Exit/In in Nashville, Tennessee
- Genres: Indie rock; Rock opera; Hard rock
- Length: 1:08:24
- Label: Sound Machine

The Protomen chronology
Act II: The Father of Death (2009)	Present: A Night of Queen (2012)	Terminator the Second (2013)

The Protomen Present: A Night of Queen is a 2012 live tribute album by rock band the Protomen. On December 10, 2010, the band, along with Evil Bebos and Devin Lamp, performed a tribute show at Exit/In in Nashville, Tennessee, in honor of Black Sabbath and Queen. The cover art is based on the album cover of Queen II. Though it was slated for a June 1, 2012 release, the album shipped early to those who pre-ordered it.

In addition to Queen covers, a live rendition of the song Due Vendetta from the Protomen's eponymous album is performed. An introduction and outro track featuring band member Kingsley ‘K.I.L.R.O.Y.’ Youngblood bookends the album in which the audience is addressed, a brief history of Queen and the performance itself is discussed, and the lyrics of the final song are completed.

== Background ==
On December 10, 2010, the band, along with Evil Bebos and Devin Lamp, performed a tribute show at Exit/In in Nashville, Tennessee, in honor of Black Sabbath and Queen. The Protomen reported working on an album of Queen covers in April 2012. Though it was slated for a June 1 release, the album shipped early to those who pre-ordered it.

== Release ==
A new Protomen logo and an interior illustration for the album packaging was created by M. L. Hope of Poor Man's Bread Studios. The cover image is a parody of a shot from the "Bohemian Rhapsody" video. The album was released as a CD and later in three different vinyl versions. The CD release was celebrated with a live performance of the album at Exit/In in Nashville, Tennessee on June 22, 2012, which featured a guest performance by Tenacious D on "Bohemian Rhapsody", that was reported on by websites like TMZ, Perez Hilton, Nashville Scene, and Ultimate Classic Rock. The digital album was released to iTunes and Amazon June 6, 2012, and Bandcamp May 21, 2018.

== Reception ==
Due to their previous coverage of Queen songs, the album was highly anticipated by Wired. PC Gamer described the album as, "a killer live album of Queen covers," and MetalSucks recommended the album, praising the authenticity of the Protomen's Queen tribute. No Country for New Nashville described the album as an "incredible tribute to Queen".

A subsequent live performance of the album featuring Jack Black was praised by Nashville Scene who note the Protomen are 'light-years Queenier than whatever is trying to pass itself off as Queen these days' and noted that the performance was a 'monumental moment' for the band.

The vinyl edition release was a finalist for the Making Vinyl Conference's Alex Steinweiss Award in the best photo LP cover category.

== Track listing ==
No.	Title	Writer(s)	Length
1.	"Intro" (accompaniment "Recitativo Accompagnato Buffa Primo")	Accompaniment by Sir Robert Bakker	1:08
2.	"Flash" (Brian May)		3:53
3.	"Battle Theme" (May)		2:35
4.	"Don't Stop Me Now" (Freddie Mercury)		3:41
5.	"Killer Queen" (Mercury)		3:26
6.	"Hammer to Fall" (May)		4:20
7.	"One Vision" (Mercury/May/Roger Taylor/John Deacon)		4:09
8.	"Somebody to Love" (Mercury)		5:18
9.	"Princes of the Universe" (Mercury)		3:29
10.	"Death on Two Legs" (Mercury)		4:32
11.	"I Want to Break Free" (Deacon)		4:16
12.	"Scandal" (May/Mercury/Taylor/Deacon)		5:01
13.	"I Want It All" (May)		5:00
14.	"The Show Must Go On" (Mercury/May/Taylor/Deacon)		6:11
15.	"Under Pressure" (feat. Devin Lamp as "Devin Bowie", Mercury/May/Taylor/Deacon/David Bowie)		4:34
16.	"Bohemian Rhapsody" (Mercury)		6:28
17.	"Due Vendetta" (The Protomen)		4:51
18.	"Outro" (accompaniment "Recitativo Accompagnato Buffa Secundo")	Accompaniment by Sir Robert Bakker	0:28
Total length:			1:08:24

== Personnel ==
=== CD album ===
Credits from the CD album liner. Mixed at Some Studio and Welcome to 1979. Performed at Exit/In Nashville, Tennessee, on December 10, 2010.

Production

- Alan Shacklock – mixing
- The Protomen – mixing
- Bert Stone – mixing
- Shaun Washburn – recording engineer
- Shelley Anderson (Georgetown Masters) – mastering
- Version Industries – art direction and design
- Matt Sundun – photography
- M. L. Hope – logo and crest design
- Devin Lamp (Meltface Records)

The Protomen

- Commander B. Hawkins
- Murphy Weller
- Raul Panther
- Sir Robert Bakker
- Kilroy (Note: Stylized as K.I.L.R.O.Y.)
- Reanimator Lovejoy
- Gambler Kirkdouglas
- Nightwalker T. Ranger
- Turbo Lover
- Ringo Segundo

=== Vinyl ===
All credits from the vinyl release are the same except the following.

- John Baldwin – mastering
