= Just a Man (The Cruel Sea song) =

1995 single by the Cruel Sea

Single by the Cruel Sea

from the album Three Legged Dog
- B-side: "Down the Stairs Backwards"; "See Ya Later"; "Moby Dick"
- Released: 13 March 1995
- Label: Red Eye
- Songwriters: Ken Gormley; Stephen Perkins
- Producers: Tony Cohen; Paul McKercher

The Cruel Sea singles chronology
"Better Get a Lawyer" (1994)	"Just a Man" (1995)	"Anybody But You" (1995)

"Just a Man" is a song by Australian indie rock band the Cruel Sea. The song was released in March 1995 as the second single from the band's fourth studio album, Three Legged Dog. The song peaked at number 39 on the Australian Singles Chart.

== Track listing ==
1. "Just a Man"
2. "Down the Stairs Backwards"
3. "See Ya Later"
4. "Moby Dick"

== Charts ==
Chart (1995)	Peak position
Australia (ARIA)	39
