= Down Below (The Cruel Sea album) =

Studio album by The Cruel Sea
- Released: December 1989
- Genre: Indie rock
- Label: Red Eye, Polydor
- Producer: Phil Punch, The Cruel Sea

The Cruel Sea chronology
| Down Below (1989) | This Is Not the Way Home (1991) |

Down Below is the debut studio album by Australian indie rock band The Cruel Sea. Originally released as a 12" EP in September 1989, it was re-released in December 1989 as the band's debut studio album.

The album includes the track "Reckless Eyeballin'" – an instrumental track that later became the theme song of Australian TV police drama, Blue Heelers (1994–2006).

== Background and release ==
The Cruel Sea formed late 1987 by Jim Elliot on drums and Dan Rumour on guitar, and as a purely instrumental outfit. In late 1988, keyboardist James Cruickshank and Ken Gormley on bass were added and in early 1989 singer Tex Perkins joined the band on a part-time basis and added lyrics to the band's melodies. The band signed to Red Eye Records in mid-1989 and released Down Below as a 9-track 12" EP in September 1989. It was re-released in December 1989 with two additional tracks as the band's debut studio album.

== Reception ==
The Canberra Times said, "The band has roped in Tex Perkins (from the Beasts of Bourbon) as singer, and his deep, mournful voice gives the vocal tracks a wonderfully evocative atmosphere. Strong acoustic or semi-acoustic guitar dominates most tracks, with a largely inconspicuous rhythm line and keyboards."

== Track listings ==
12" EP Side A
| No. | Title | Writer(s) | Length |
|---|---|---|---|
| 1. | "Down Below" | Jim Elliott; Tex Perkins; Dan Rumour | 3:15 |
| 2. | "The Gap" | Elliott; Rumour | 2:33 |
| 3. | "Deadwood" | Perkins; Rumour | 3:20 |
| 4. | "Navigate" | Elliott; Rumour | 1:49 |

12" EP Side B
| No. | Title | Writer(s) | Length |
|---|---|---|---|
| 1. | "The Drift" | Rumour | 2:14 |
| 2. | "Margarita" | Elliott; Perkins; Rumour | 2:44 |
| 3. | "Reckless Eyeballin'" | Rumour | 1:39 |
| 4. | "How Low" | Elliott; Perkins; Rumour | 4:35 |
| 5. | "I Don't Know Why" | Elliott; Perkins; Rumour | 1:35 |

Studio album
| No. | Title | Writer(s) | Length |
|---|---|---|---|
| 1. | "Down Below" | Jim Elliott; Tex Perkins; Dan Rumour | 3:15 |
| 2. | "The Gap" | Elliott; Rumour | 2:33 |
| 3. | "Deadwood" | Perkins; Rumour | 3:20 |
| 4. | "Navigate" | Elliott; Rumour | 1:49 |
| 5. | "I'll Take Care Of You" | Bobby Bland | 3:15 |
| 6. | "Zip It Up" | Elliott; Perkins; Rumour | 4:34 |
| 7. | "The Drift" | Rumour | 2:14 |
| 8. | "Margarita" | Elliott; Perkins; Rumour | 2:44 |
| 9. | "Reckless Eyeballin'" | Rumour | 1:39 |
| 10. | "How Low" | Elliott; Perkins; Rumour | 4:35 |
| 11. | "I Don't Know Why" | Elliott; Perkins; Rumour | 1:35 |

== Charts ==
| Chart (1989) | Peak position |
|---|---|
| Australian Albums (ARIA) | 133 |

== Release history ==
| Country | Date | Format | Label | Catalogue |
|---|---|---|---|---|
| Australia | September 1989 | 12" Extended Play | Red Eye Records | REDEP 7 |
| Australia | 2 December 1990 | CD, Cassette, LP | Red Eye Records, Polydor Records | 843665-1, REDLP 19 |
