= Lighthouse Keepers (band) =

Australian band

The Lighthouse Keepers
- Origin: Canberra, Australian Capital Territory, Australia
- Genres: Country music, indie pop
- Years active: 1981–2012
- Labels: Guthugga Pipeline, Hot, Waterfront, Phantom, Feel Presents
- Members: Greg Appel; Stephen O'Neil; Juliet Ward; Michael Dalton; Steven Williams

The Lighthouse Keepers, initially the Light-Housekeepers, were an Australian country and indie pop band formed in 1981 in Canberra. In November 1984 the group issued their debut studio album, Tales of the Unexpected, and a single, "Ocean Liner". In 1985 the band toured the United Kingdom supporting Hot label mates, The Triffids. The Lighthouse Keepers combined a "loosely rehearsed, casual ethos" with humour, punk attitudes and pure pop song craft. The ensemble disbanded in 1986, releasing a compilation album, Imploding, in November that year. According to rock music historian, Ian McFarlane, their "tasteful, jangly brand of country-tinged folk rock was at odds with prevailing trends on Sydney's early 1980s, Detroit-besotted independent scene. The band nevertheless issued a number of albums and singles, and always lived up to audience expectations".

== Formation ==
The Lighthouse Keepers founders' Greg Appel on acoustic guitar, bass, keyboards and vocals, and Stephen O'Neil on drums, bass, guitar and saxophone were members of Canberra-based groups The Grant Brothers and Guthugga Pipeline. The pair were joined by Juliet Ward on vocals, bass guitar and keyboards as Tex Truck and the Semis, for a University of Technology, Sydney (UTS) student talent quest. In 1981 augmented by Michael "Blue" Dalton on slide guitar, dobro, bass guitar and harmonica they formed The Lighthouse Keepers. Dalton was a vintage music enthusiast who contributed a country blues style to arrangements as a foil to multi-instrumentalist O'Neil's nifty and melodic bass, drums, guitar and C melody sax playing, further complementing the rich timbre and interpretive abilities of vocalist Ward, with Appel's understated but skilfully rendered jangling Morris brand 12-string guitar. All members rotated to bass playing duties both on stage and also in the studio to facilitate various song arrangements.

== Musical influences ==
The Lighthouse Keepers' repertoire was initially steeped in country, blues, folk, pop and jazz which later infused Appel's melodic and lyrically engaging songs melded with emotionally charged vocals by Ward. Along with subtle somewhat larrikin humour, stories dealing with suburban teenage angst and interpersonal relationships, were bitter sweet love songs, a couple of instrumental contributions from O'Neil and Appel, plus a sprinkling of cover versions highlighting their musical influences, for example, 'St. James Infirmary Blues' and 'Big Noise from Winnetka'. Other diverse influences included Australian country musician, Chad Morgan, American C&W songs such as 'A Dear John Letter' and Sun Records era rockabilly artists including early Narvel Felts, as well as the newly emerging and more contemporary British American and Australian independent bands of the time.

== Early recordings ==
The Lighthouse Keepers' early cassette recordings include a live performance (replete with Ward's dog "Chaos" contributing back up vocals) of a Tim Spencer composition "Cigareetes and Whusky", originally recorded by The Sons of the Pioneers, the Willie Dixon Big Three Trio and Red Ingle. A demo version of the country standard "I Fall to Pieces" (popularised by Patsy Cline), was recorded in late 1982 on a Sony 4-track and mixed to cassette, with vocals by Ward accompanied by Appel on acoustic guitar who later overdubbed bass and slide guitars.

== "Gargoyle" ==
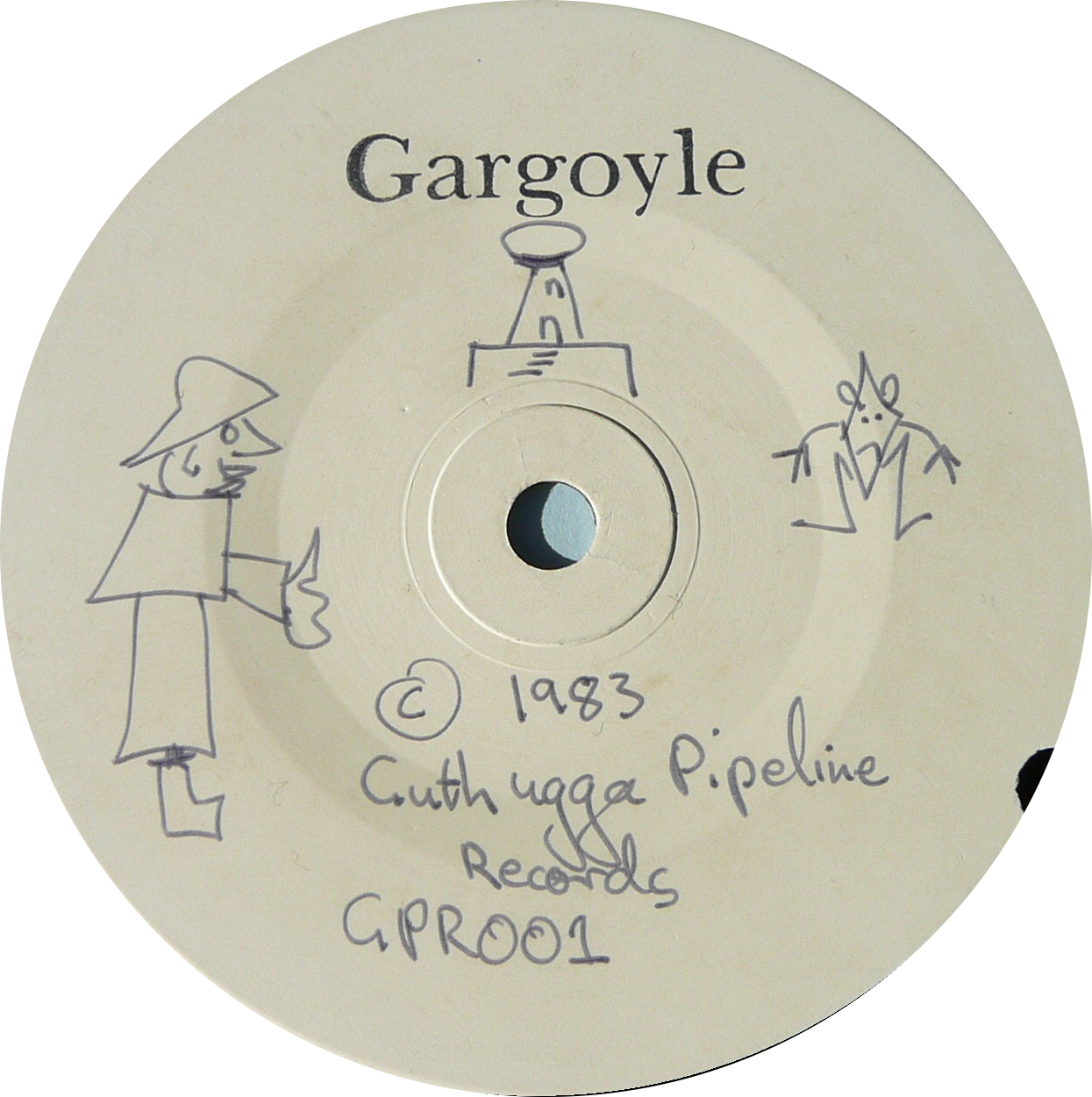
Example of hand drawn disc label for initial release of Gargoyle on Guthugga Pipeline Records.(GPR 001) A-side

In 1983 The Lighthouse Keepers issued their first single, "Gargoyle", as a three-track 7-inch vinyl 45 rpm on their own independent label, Guthugga Pipeline Records. Production costs were financed independently by the band and early pressings sported individually hand drawn disc labels and cover art by band members.

The A-side, "Gargoyle", featured vocals by Ward, and the two B-side tracks: "Demolition Team", and "Quick Sticks", were both sung by Appel. All three original compositions were written by Appel who played 12-string acoustic guitar utilising a stomp box effects unit compressor. O'Neil played percussion on a borrowed drum kit. Initial overdubs, including bass guitar played by Appel and blues-style harmonica and dobro style slide guitar by Dalton, were later finished by doubletracking of Ward's vocals.

Recordings were completed at Dream Studios Mk3 on a Teac 8-track 1/2-inch analog reel-to-reel tape recorder running at 7 1/2 ips and later mixed to a Technics 15 ips 1/4-inch 2-track referenced with Auratone 5c sound cubes.

In keeping with the prevailing autodidactic 'zeitgeist', the audio engineers encouraged the band to purchase their own blank tapes and follow the production processes from mastering by Don Bartley at EMI's Sydney Studios to "test pressing" at EMI's Homebush record plant where vinyl discs were manufactured through EMI's custom pressing service. "Strike a Lighthouse!" is etched near the matrix numbers of the run-out grooves.

== The Exploding Lighthouse Keepers (1983) ==
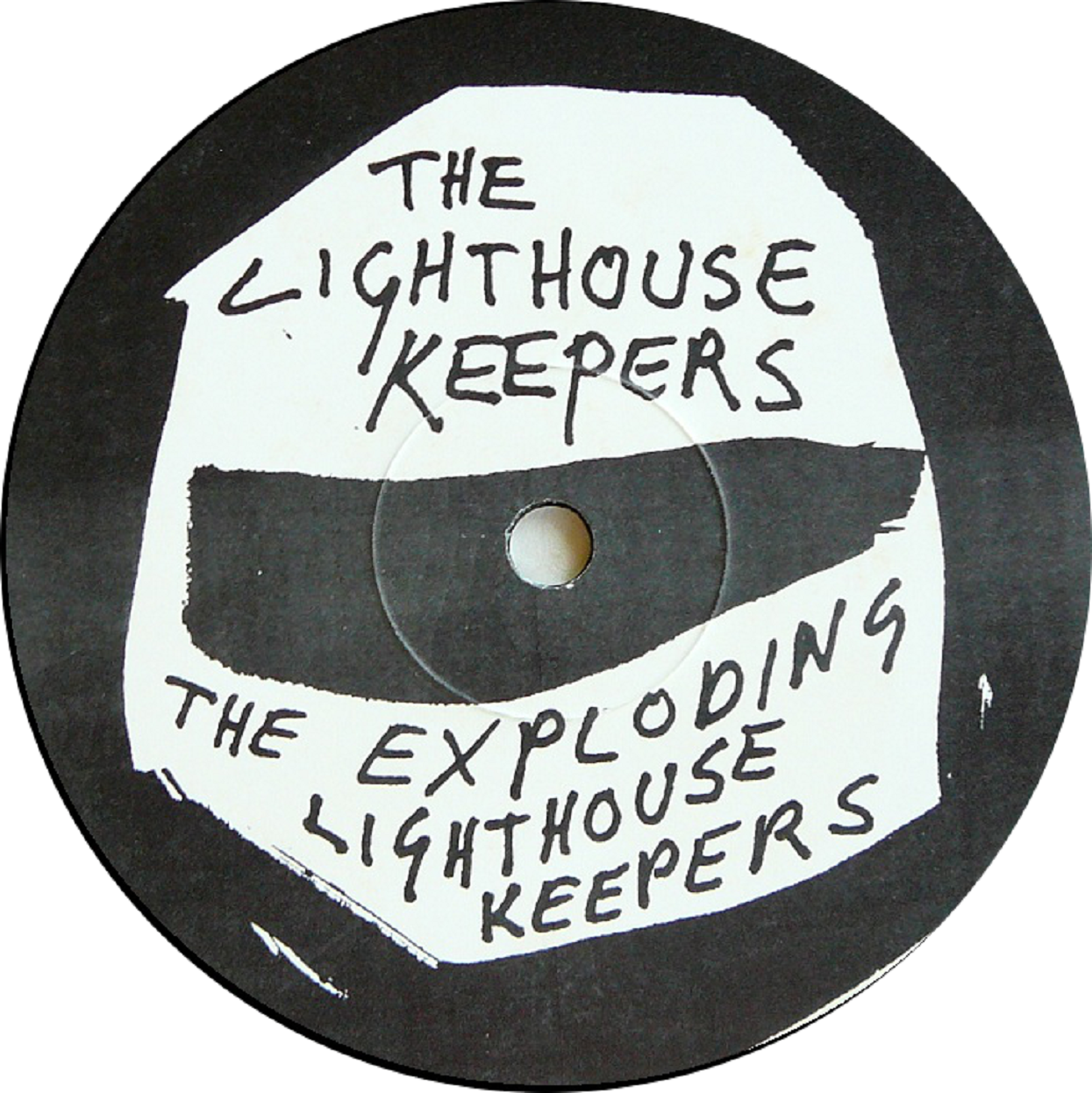
The Exploding Lighthouse Keepers (GPR 004) A-side

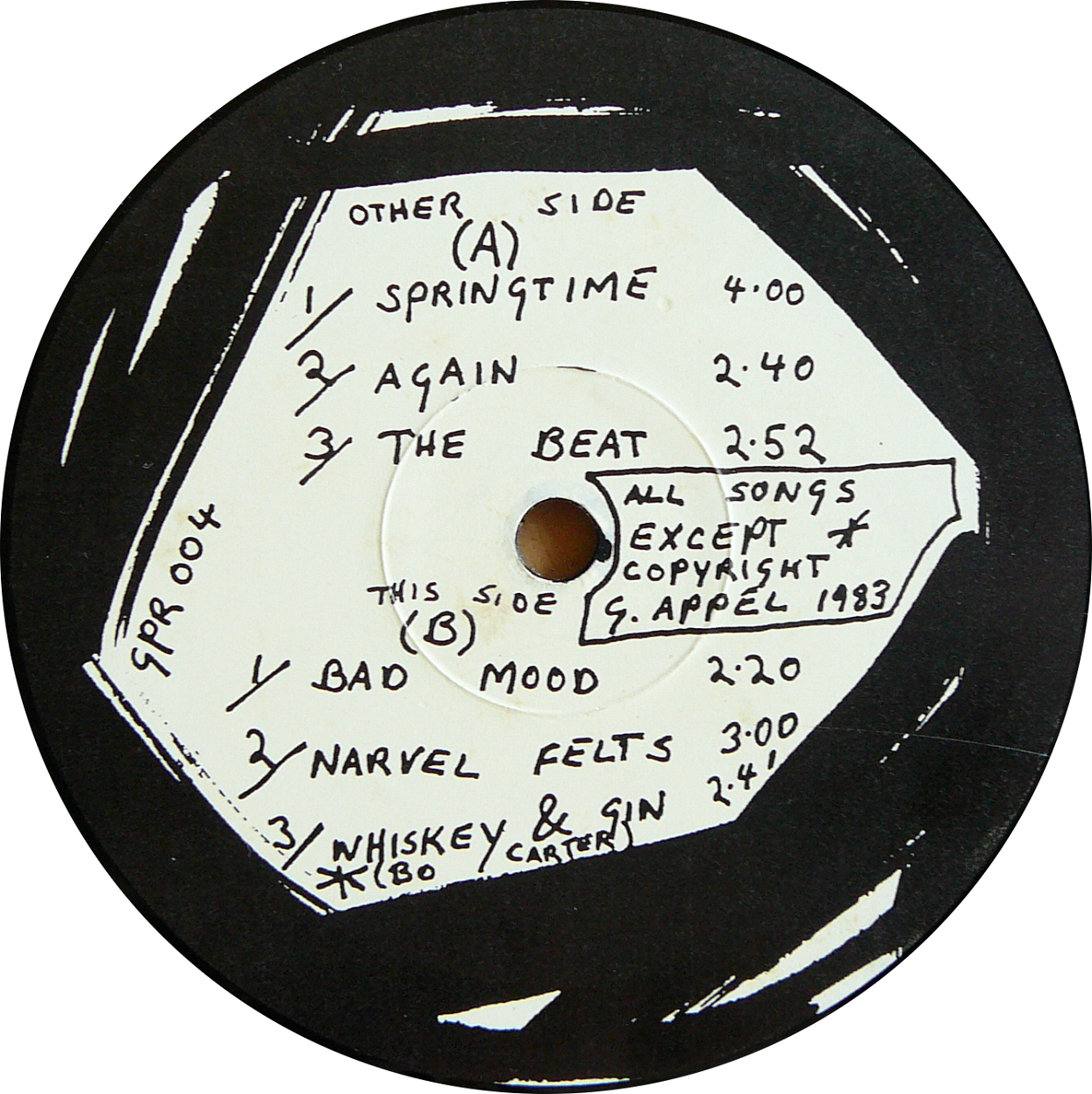
The Exploding Lighthouse Keepers (GPR 004) B-side

In mid-1983, the Lighthouse Keepers added Steven Williams on drums and as their manager – Williams was also a member of post punk band The Particles with O'Neil. In November The Lighthouse Keepers released a second recording on their own Guthugga Pipeline label. The self-produced and -distributed 12-inch 45 rpm six-track "Lo-fi" extended play was titled The Exploding Lighthouse Keepers. The EP showcased another five of Appel's songs and musical arrangements plus a cover version of the Bo Carter country blues song "Whisky and Gin".

Opening with "Springtime", the EP highlighted the country blues style harmonica of Dalton, which was in part characteristic of the Lighthouse Keepers' sound. The disc heralded the introduction of brass instruments into the group's instrumental range which continued in subsequent recordings. Trumpet player Alex Hamilton, who also played the solo on The Particles track "I Luv Trumpet", contributed overdubbed brass lines on "Bad Mood" and the duet intro for country ballad "Again". Musical arrangements were embellished with keyboard and tambourine played by Ward with additional percussion by O'Neil. The integration of the driving pop sensibility of drummer Williams, allowed O'Neil to add second guitar parts to "The Beat" and "Narvel Felts". Album cover artwork was by Appel with the record sleeve insert artwork attributed to Fabian.

With the exception of "Whiskey and Gin" (which was recorded direct to a Technics 15 ips 1/4-inch 2-track in the bathroom of a Redfern terrace), all other tracks were recorded as live instrumental backing tracks (guide vocals retained and later doubled to form a composite vocal track) with drums sub mixed to stereo allowing space for overdubs. Recording was again done at Peter Hornak's, Dream Studio Mk3, located in an old warehouse in the historic Haymarket area of Sydney.

== Tales of the Unexpected (1984) ==
The Lighthouse Keepers signed to Hot Records where their diverse label mates included Wet Taxis, The Triffids and Laughing Clowns. In August 1984 the label re-issued "Gargoyle" and followed in November with the band's first studio album, "Tales of the Unexpected" which resulted in their most successful single "Ocean Liner". The album was recorded during August at Paradise Studios in Woolloomooloo, Sydney by David Price, assisted by Tom Colley, the house engineers . The recording facility featured Westlake Audio monitors (cross referenced by Yamaha NS-10 near field monitors), twin MCI 24-track tape recorders, Harrison automated mixing console and 'state of the art' acoustic design and microphones. The album was recorded and mixed at 30ips during ten "discount rate" consecutive midnight to dawn sessions. It was produced by The Lighthouse Keepers and John Basett and mixed by Price, LHK and Basett. Additional musicians provided mandolin, banjo, baritone sax, trombone and trumpet. The band rose to the challenges of working at a professional level, taking the opportunity to develop their own distinctive sound and musical direction. Mastering, test pressing and record production from stampers was completed at the CBS studios (see also Columbia records). The album cover painting artwork was by O'Neil.

== Career highlights ==
The Lighthouse Keepers are described in various rock music publications, including Encyclopedia of Australian Rock and Pop(1999) The Who's Who of Australian Rock (2002), Inner City Sound (2005), and Blunt: A Biased History of Australian Rock (2001). They were also favourably reviewed by Stuart Coupe in the Sun Herald. as well as sections of the local rock press who were generally supportive of indie bands, including On the Street, RAM, Juke and other publications. The Lighthouse Keepers received airplay through the alternative radio stations 2SER, 2JJJ and similar community radio networks interstate. They garnered glowing reviews in the British music journals, NME and Sounds. They supported international artists touring Australia such as Jonathan Richman and John Cooper Clarke (1983) and The Violent Femmes, as well as the Brisbane band The Go-Betweens (1984). They built up a loyal following whilst performing regularly along the Australian east coast with occasional treks westwards across the Nullarbor Plain to Perth. The Lighthouse Keepers undertook a low key tour of Europe in 1985, which included an outdoor festival in Rotterdam headlined by The Triffids and The Woodentops, as well as gigs in Germany, Switzerland, Italy and Austria, returning to England to support The Triffids at Leeds University, the Clarendon Hammersmith and other shows in and around London.

== Imploding (1986) ==
Early in 1986 The Lighthouse Keepers returned to Australia and disbanded after a career including over 350 performances. On 28 March they held a farewell show at the Graphics Arts Club, Chippendale. In November, Waterfront Records released their compilation album, 'Imploding'. The runout groove on side-B read "Would the last person to leave please turn-out the lighthouse".

== Reunions ==
Since disbanding, The Lighthouse Keepers have reunited sporadically to play private parties, launch their own 2× CD compilation, "Lipsnipegroin", at the Annandale Hotel in Sydney (1992) and help launch the 2× CD various artists compilation, 'Tales from the Australian Underground' at the Metro in Sydney (2003). They have also played tribute shows, benefits, (2009) and opened both nights of the final leg of a Laughing Clowns reformation tour at the Basement in Sydney (2009).

In August 2011, a further compilation of The Lighthouse Keepers' material "ode to nothing" was issued as a 15-track remastered "best of" CD. They were joined by Perth-based drummer Hugh Veldon for a well attended and reviewed live show at the Sandringham Hotel Sydney September (2011) followed by a string of suburban gigs during January and February 2012 in Melbourne, Canberra with the final performance in Sydney at Marrickville. Some of these shows featured ex- Widdershins left handed drummer Peter Timmerman as well as original drummer Steven Williams returning to reprise his role on some songs with extra excitement generated when he and Timmerman played drums simultaneously. The shows were unique in featuring a "guest speaker" each night.

Adapting to the new media LHK, old fans, and an emerging modern audience interacted via social network services which saw releases of additional self-produced DIY video clips from the band, and had the unexpected reciprocal benefit of generating a number of videos, captured by audience members of live performances from the reunion tour, using a variety of devices ranging from hand held mobile phones and cameras to digital video recorders and then uploaded to YouTube.

== Postscript ==
Stephen O'Neil became a librarian and maintained an international recording and touring career with indie pop group, The Cannanes.

Appel and Ward formed the short-lived Rainlovers, which in 1987 evolved into Widdershins before disbanding in 1989. Appel and younger brother Steve also played live and recorded together in various loose-knit bands sometimes with their youngest brother David (vocals, trumpet, percussion). A fourth Appel brother, Rob, founded the Internet music retail website Chaos.com.

Ward is a scientific researcher who has studied the Dingo and still performs live casually. She participated in a 2007 podcast, and does occasional interviews. As "Jet" Ward she recorded a cover version of the song "Rachael Cooper" by Baterz ( a member of the cult band The Bedridden) on the 3× CD album, "Great Big Sqiddy Fun- A Baterz Tribute".

Appel has his own Spontaneous Films production company and has also worked for the Australian Broadcasting Corporation (ABC) producing and/or directing radio and TV projects, including work with producer Paul Clarke on the ABC six-part music documentary series, 'Long Way To The Top' (August–September 2001).

Amongst other post The Lighthouse Keepers projects is Van Park – The Musical written by Appel and featuring music by Steve's King Curly and a cast including John Paul Young and Steve Kilbey, which premiered at the Seymour Centre during the 2010 Sydney Fringe Festival; and in March 2013 was revived for the Oakleigh 'Carnival of Suburbia' in Melbourne.

== Members ==
- Greg Appel – acoustic 12-string guitar, bass, keyboards, vocals (1981–2012)
- Stephen O'Neil – drums, bass, guitar, saxophone (1981–2012)
- Juliet "Jet" Ward – vocals, bass, keyboards (1981–2012)
- Michael "Blue" Dalton – slide guitar, dobro, bass, harmonica (1981–2012)
- Steven Williams – drums (1983–2012)
- Hugh Veldon – drums (2011)
- Peter Timmerman – drums (2012)

== Discography ==
=== Albums ===
- Tales of the Unexpected (1984, Hot Records 1011)
- Imploding (compilation album 1986, vinyl LP album, Waterfront Records DAMP33)
- Lipsnipegroin (compilation album, 1999, 2× CD, Phantom Records PHDCD-19)
- Ode to Nothing – The Best of The Lighthouse Keepers (15-track remastered retrospective, 2011, CD, FEEL 009)

=== Extended plays ===
- The Exploding Lighthouse Keepers (Mini Album, 1983)

=== Singles ===
- "Gargoyle"/"Demolition Team", "Quick Sticks" (Maxi-single, 1983, Guthugga Pipeline Records GPR 001)
  - "Gargoyle"/"Demolition Team", "Quick Sticks" (1984, Hot Records reissue)
- "Ocean Liner"/"A Sad Tale" (1984, Hot Records 720)
- "Ode to Nothing"/"Seven Years", (1985, Hot Records 724)

=== Other appearances ===
- "Various" – Inner City Sound compilation :Laughing Outlaw Records Catalog#:LORICS-001.
