= Better Get a Lawyer =

1994 single by the Cruel Sea

Single by the Cruel Sea

from the album Three Legged Dog
- B-side: "Looks Like It's Gonna Rain"; "Manic Depression"; "5,000 Dead Lawyers"
- Released: 28 November 1994
- Genre: Rock
- Length: 3:02
- Label: Red Eye
- Songwriters: Jon Wayne; Jim Elliott; Tex Perkins; Dan Rumour; James Cruickshank
- Producers: Tony Cohen; Paul McKercher; the Cruel Sea

The Cruel Sea singles chronology
"Seems Twice" (1994)	"Better Get a Lawyer" (1994)	"Just a Man" (1995)

"Better Get a Lawyer" is a song by Australian indie rock band the Cruel Sea. The song was released in November 1994 as the lead single from the band's fourth studio album, Three Legged Dog. The song peaked at number 29 on the Australian Singles Chart. The track borrows lyrics heavily from Jon Wayne's "Texas Jailcell", giving Wayne a songwriter credit. "Better Get a Lawyer" was ranked at number 14 on the Triple J Hottest 100, 1994. The CD single contains an unlisted song after the final track that contains a spoken-word piece containing lyrics concerning the 1970s TV programme Charlie's Angels.

== Music video ==
The black and white music video depicts Perkins being arrested and the band being placed in a cell. Part of the intended video was censored. Bass player Ken Gormly explained: "What they didn't like was the expression on Tex's face when he was put in a headlock, so we had to put that blurred effect on his face. The thing is, you've got to do what they say because you've spent $20,000 on a film clip, which will just be a big egg if it isn't played."

== Track listing ==
1. "Better Get a Lawyer" – 3:02
2. "Looks Like It's Gonna Rain" – 2:07
3. "Manic Depression" – 2:44
4. "5,000 Dead Lawyers" – 5:53

== Charts ==
Chart (1995)	Peak position
Australia (ARIA)	29
