= One Just Man =

One Just Man may refer to:

- "One Just Man" (The Vise), 1954 The Vise television episode
- One Just Man, 1975 film a.k.a. Syndicate Sadists
- The putative only just man in the city of Sodom, namely Lot (Sodom)
- One Just Man, the 1974 novel by James Mills.
