= The Honeymoon Is Over (song) =

1993 single by the Cruel Sea

Single by the Cruel Sea

from the album The Honeymoon Is Over
- Released: 12 July 1993
- Studio: Planet (Perth, Australia)
- Genre: Rock
- Length: 3:06
- Label: Polydor; Red Eye
- Songwriter(s): Tex Perkins; Daniel Rumour; James Watson
- Producer(s): Tony Cohen; Mick Harvey; The Cruel Sea

The Cruel Sea singles chronology
"Black Stick" (1993)	"The Honeymoon Is Over" (1993)	"Woman with Soul" (1993)

"The Honeymoon Is Over" is a song by Australian indie rock band the Cruel Sea. The song was released in July 1993 as the second single from the band's third studio album, The Honeymoon Is Over. The song peaked at number 41 on the Australian ARIA Singles Chart.

== Inspiration ==
Perkins later said, "The song is all based around the lines: 'Gonna send you back to wherever the hell it was you came. Then I'm gonna get this tattoo changed to another girl's name'. Before we went into the studio to record, I had met a bloke that had gone through this very dilemma. What to do with the old girlfriend's name written on you after she's not your girlfriend anymore and you now have a new girlfriend who wants HER name there instead?"

== Reception ==
Junkee described the song as a "rich, laquered oak table of a rock belter that features everything from a scat chorus to a sea of tendrils for a guitar part. It's pub rock laced with LSD; a panic attack in a dive-bar bathroom. There's nothing like it."

At the ARIA Music Awards of 1994, the song won the ARIA Award for Best Song and Best Single. It was also ranked number nine in the Triple J Hottest 100, 1993; the highest placing by an Australian artist. Double J ranked it within the top fifty Australian songs of the 1990s, saying, "There's so much to love about this song. From the blown gasket sound at the start, to the spine-tingling surf-crashing guitar licks, it takes you from the desert to the sea via a raging bust up." In January 2018, as part of Triple M's "Ozzest 100", the 'most Australian' songs of all time, "The Honeymoon Is Over" was ranked number 96.

== Track listing ==
1. "The Honeymoon Is Over"
2. "Delivery Man"
3. "Blue Dog"
4. "She Still Comes Around"

== Charts ==
Chart (1993)	Peak position
Australia (ARIA)	41

== Release history ==
Region	Date	Format(s)	Label(s)	Ref.
Australia	12 July 1993	CD; cassette	Polydor; Red Eye	
United States	18 January 1994	Album rock; album alternative radio	A&M; Red Eye	
United States	1 February 1994	Modern rock radio	A&M; Red Eye	
