= The Cruel Sea (band) =

Australian indie rock band

- Origin: Sydney, New South Wales, Australia
- Genres: Indie rock; surf rock; blues; funk
- Years active: 1987–2003, 2008, 2010, 2023–present
- Labels: Red Eye; Polydor; A&M
- Members: Jim Elliott; Dan Rumour; Ken Gormly; Tex Perkins; Matt Walker
- Past members: Gerard Corben; Dee Corben; James Cruickshank; Barry Turnbull

The Cruel Sea are an Australian indie rock band from Sydney, New South Wales, formed in late 1987. Originally an instrumental band, they became more popular when fronted by vocalist Tex Perkins (also Beasts of Bourbon). For the majority of the band's tenure, the band has featured Jim Elliott on drums, Ken Gormly on bass guitar, Dan Rumour on guitar and James Cruickshank on guitar and keyboards. Between 1990 and 2001, the band released six studio albums – three of which (1991's This Is Not the Way Home, 1993's The Honeymoon Is Over and 1995's Three Legged Dog) were certified platinum by ARIA. The band are also known for their music having featured on television, such as "Better Get a Lawyer" soundtracking an RTA ad targeting drink driving, and "Reckless Eyeballin'" – an instrumental track from their debut album Down Below – becoming the theme of Australian TV police drama Blue Heelers. The band has won eight ARIA Music Awards, including five in 1994 for work associated with The Honeymoon Is Over.

== History ==
=== Formation and early years ===
Danny Rumour (aka Daniel John Atkins) was a member of punk rock bands Blackrunner, Urban Guerrillas, Friction, Ugly Mirrors and Bedhogs in Sydney from the mid-1970s to 1980. In 1980 he formed Sekret Sekret which played a "sprightly brand of punky power pop with psychedelic overtones". Sekret Sekret would often play at Sydney pub, The Grand Hotel, with Rumour assembling an ad hoc line-up of musicians using instruments housed at the venue. With lead vocalist David Virgin (ex-Ugly Mirrors), Des Devlin (ex-Ugly Mirrors) and Peter Mullany (ex-Johnny Dole & The Scabs) they released four independent singles by 1984. When they broke up in 1984, the line-up was Rumour (guitar), Virgin (vocals), Devlin (guitar), James Elliot (drums) and Ken Gormly (bass guitar).

After Sekret Sekret disbanded, The Cruel Sea was formed in late 1987 by Elliot on drums and Rumour on guitar. They enlisted Dee Corben on bass guitar and his brother, Gerard "Ged" Corben (also in Lime Spiders), on guitar. The name was from a 1964 surf instrumental, "Cruel Sea", by United States group The Ventures (a cover of The Dakotas' 1963 single, which was in turn inspired by the novel and film of the same name). Early gigs in 1988 were played at the Harold Park Hotel, behind a pool table where space was so tight that the guitarists had to move out of the way when pool players took a shot. The original line-up played about 20 shows and parties, then Dee Corben left, he was replaced by former Sekret Sekret bandmate, Gormly. Barry Turnbull (ex-John Kennedy's Love Gone Wrong, The Widdershins) briefly substituted for Gormly on bass guitar. James Cruickshank (The Widdershins) joined on keyboards and guitars.

=== Early albums: Down Below and This Is Not the Way Home ===
In 1989, The Cruel Sea invited vocalist Tex Perkins, their lighting technician and member of Beasts of Bourbon, to join them on-stage. Perkins had written lyrics for some of their instrumentals. The band was signed by Red Eye Records and released a 12" extended play (EP), Down Below, in September. It contained nine tracks and was produced by Phil Punch (The Mexican Spitfires) and The Cruel Sea. It was followed by an eleven-track album of the same name, Down Below in December 1990; both releases featured Perkins on vocals. "Reckless Eyeballin'" – an instrumental track on the album – later became the theme song of Australian TV police drama, Blue Heelers (1994–2006). Although Perkins was also performing with Beasts of Bourbon, The Cruel Sea built a following on the inner-city pub rock circuit with "atmospheric music [that] evoked the feel of wide open spaces". During 1990, Ged Corben left to focus on his work with Lime Spiders.

A single, "I Feel" was released in September 1991 ahead of their second album, This Is Not the Way Home issued in October. It was produced by Tony Cohen (The Birthday Party, Beasts of Bourbon) and The Cruel Sea. The album provided a range of music "from funky Louisiana swamp blues to sweet soul". Vocals by Perkins were compared with Captain Beefheart, John Lee Hooker and Tony Joe White. "4" followed in March 1992 with "This Is Not the Way Home" released as a single in August. After the album's release, the band toured Europe in support of Nick Cave and the Bad Seeds. In March 1993 they released, "Black Stick" as a single, which peaked at No. 25 on the Australian Recording Industry Association (ARIA) Singles Chart. This Is Not the Way Home received a nomination for 'Best Group' at the ARIA Music Awards of 1993.

=== Mainstream success: The Honeymoon Is Over and Three Legged Dog ===
In early 1993, The Cruel Sea had Perkins on-board full-time with his commitment to Beasts of Bourbon on hold. The Cruel Sea's third album, The Honeymoon Is Over was produced by the band, Cohen and Mick Harvey (Robert Forster, Anita Lane) of Nick Cave and the Bad Seeds. Released in May, it peaked at No. 4 on the ARIA Albums Chart, and sold over 140,000 copies. The title song, "The Honeymoon Is Over" reached the Top 50 in August. It was followed by a cover of White's 1969 song, "Woman with Soul", which peaked at No. 64. Perkins also performed as a member in the country-blues trio, Tex, Don and Charlie and released Sad But True (1993).

At the ARIA Music Awards of 1994, The Cruel Sea won 'Single of the Year' and 'Song of the Year' for "The Honeymoon is Over", 'Album of the Year' and 'Best Group' for The Honeymoon is Over and received three further nominations including 'Best Cover Art' by Kristyna Higgins and Jay Manby. At an after-party, a drunken guest attacked Higgins, a professional photographer, and a fracas ensued with Perkins defending his partner. Also that night, two of their ARIA trophies were stolen. Late in 1994, the group toured Europe, again supporting Nick Cave and the Bad Seeds. They followed with a headlining tour across Europe and to Canada.

The next album, Three Legged Dog, was produced by Cohen, the group and Paul McKercher (Clouds). It was released in April 1995 and peaked at No. 1. The Cruel Sea toured Canada, United States and Europe, followed by a support slot for The Rolling Stones on the Australian leg of their Voodoo Lounge Tour. Top 50 singles from Three Legged Dog were "Better Get a Lawyer" (November 1994), "Just a Man" (March 1995) and "Anybody But You" (July). The album won an ARIA in 1995 for 'Best Group' and two nominations, 'Album of the Year', and 'Best Cover Art' for Higgins and Jim Paton.

=== Later years ===
The Cruel Sea's next album, Rock'n Roll Duds, was a compilation of b-sides and studio outtakes, released in November 1995. The group had a two-year hiatus in releases, Perkins issued his first solo album, Far Be it from Me (1996) and contributed to Beasts of Bourbon's Gone (1997). The Cruel Sea returned to their instrumental roots and embarked on a series of gigs without Perkins, including the Big Day Out tour.

In February 1998, with Perkins returned, the group released a single, "Hard Times" ahead of its album Over Easy in August. The album was produced by Daniel Denholm (Frente!, Boom Crash Opera), Phil McKellar (Grinspoon, Frenzal Rhomb), the band and McKercher. It peaked at No. 13 and was followed by their Takin All Day national tour through most of 1998. The band's first greatest hits album, The Most appeared in November 1999 and reached the Top 50. Perkins then released his second solo album Dark Horses in 2000.

In August 2001, ABC TV broadcast the series, Long Way to the Top. Perkins featured on "Episode 6: Gathering of the Tribes 1984–2000" where he discussed his non-mainstream work with both Beasts of Bourbon and The Cruel Sea, which were "providing the poor forgotten 5% with something – who like the really fucked up weird shit". In September their next album, Where There's Smoke, produced by Magoo (Regurgitator, Midnight Oil) and the band, appeared and reached the Top 30. It was followed by another compilation, We Don't Work, We Play Music in October 2002 with "Groovy Situation" issued as a single.

Individual members then concentrated on side or solo projects. In early 2005, Perkins returned to Tex, Don and Charlie and released All is Forgiven in March. Guitarist and main composer, Rumour began touring and recording with his own roots-style instrumental band, the Dan Rumour Band, and Elliot joined on drums by mid-2006. In August, Perkins declared on ABC2's Dig radio program that The Cruel Sea were no more. The Dan Rumour Band appeared on the Australian surf music project Delightful Rain, released that October, as well as in a documentary film of the same name on Australian television in December. Rumour's first solo album was released in October 2007, as Dan Rumour and The Drift.

In spite of his earlier statement, The Cruel Sea toured Melbourne and Sydney in 2008 before their Blues & Roots Festival performances. They also toured Australia in 2010. The full band joined Bernard Fanning as support for his Day On The Green tour of Australia in October to November 2013.

Guitarist and keyboardist James Cruickshank died on 8 October 2015 after a long battle with bowel cancer.

In 2023, the band reconvened to celebrate the 30th anniversary of The Honeymoon Is Over, with the addition of longtime collaborator Matt Walker on guitar to play Cruickshank's parts. This ultimately led to recording sessions for a new album, Straight Into the Sun, which came out in 2025.

In 2026 the band joined Paul Kelly, Missy Higgins, The Cat Empire, Kasey Chambers and Jess Hitchcock on the Red Hot Summer Tour which toured primarily regional centres in Australia.

== Members ==
Current members

- Jim Elliott – drums (1987–2003, 2008, 2010, 2023–present)
- Dan Rumour – guitar, clavinet (1987–2003, 2008, 2010, 2023–present)
- Ken Gormly – bass guitar (1988–1990, 1990–2003, 2008, 2010, 2023–present)
- Tex Perkins – lead vocals, harmonica, occasional guitar (1989–2003, 2008, 2010, 2023–present)
- Matt Walker – guitar, keyboards, backing vocals (2023–present)

Former members

- Dee Corben – bass guitar (1987–1988)
- Gerard Corben – guitar (1987–1990)
- Barry Turnbull – bass guitar (1990)
- James Cruickshank – keyboards, guitar, backing vocals (1988–2003, 2008, 2010; died 2015)

== Discography ==
=== Studio albums ===
| Title | Album details | Peak chart positions | | Certifications |
| Title | Album details | AUS | NZ | Certifications |
|---|---|---|---|---|
| Down Below | Released: 3 December 1990; Formats: CD, LP; Label: Red Eye | 133 | — | |
| This Is Not the Way Home | Released: 28 October 1991; Formats: CD, LP; Label: Red Eye | 62 | — | ARIA: Platinum |
| The Honeymoon Is Over | Released: 31 May 1993; Formats: CD, LP, cassette; Label: Red Eye | 4 | 33 | ARIA: 3× Platinum |
| Three Legged Dog | Released: April 1995; Formats: CD, LP, cassette; Label: Red Eye | 1 | 20 | ARIA: Platinum |
| Over Easy | Released: July 1998; Formats: CD; Label: Polydor | 13 | — | |
| Where There's Smoke | Released: September 2001; Formats: CD; Label: Polydor | 25 | — | |
| Straight Into the Sun | Released: 7 March 2025; Formats: CD, LP, digital download; Label: Universal | 18 | — | |

=== Compilation albums ===
| Title | Album details | Peak chart positions | Certifications |
| Title | Album details | AUS | Certifications |
|---|---|---|---|
| Rock'n Roll Duds - Best of the B-Sides | Released: November 1995; Formats: CD, LP; Label: Red Eye | 40 | |
| The Most (The Best of The Cruel Sea) | Released: November 1999; Formats: CD; Label: Grudge, Red Eye | 43 | ARIA: Gold |
| We Don't Work, We Play Music | Released: October 2002; Formats: CD; Label: Universal Music Australia | 155 | |

=== Extended plays ===
| Title | EP details |
|---|---|
| Down Below | Released: September 1989; Formats: LP; Label: Red Eye |

=== Singles ===
| Title | Year | Peak chart positions | Album |
| Title | Year | AUS | Album |
|---|---|---|---|
| "I Feel" | 1991 | 175 | This Is Not the Way Home |
| "4" (titled 4x4) | 1992 | 83 | This Is Not the Way Home |
| "This Is Not the Way Home" | 1992 | 130 | This Is Not the Way Home |
| "Black Stick" | 1993 | 25 | The Honeymoon Is Over |
| "The Honeymoon Is Over" | 1993 | 41 | The Honeymoon Is Over |
| "Woman with Soul" | 1993 | 64 | The Honeymoon Is Over |
| "Seems Twice" | 1994 | 90 | The Honeymoon Is Over |
| "Better Get a Lawyer" | 1994 | 29 | Three Legged Dog |
| "Just a Man" | 1995 | 39 | Three Legged Dog |
| "Anybody But You" | 1995 | 49 | Three Legged Dog |
| "Too Fast for Me" | 1995 | 107 | Three Legged Dog |
| "Hard Times" | 1998 | 115 | Over Easy |
| "Takin' All Day" | 1998 | 132 | Over Easy |
| "You'll Do" | 1998 | — | Over Easy |
| "A Simple Goodbye" | 2001 | — (Note: "A Simple Goodbye" was released as a promotional radio single, which made it ineligible to chart in Australia.) | Where There's Smoke |
| "No Choice" | 2001 | — | Where There's Smoke |
| "Groovy Situation" | 2002 | — (Note: "Groovy Situation" was released as a promotional radio single, which made it ineligible to chart in Australia.) | We Don't Work, We Play Music |
| "Straight Into the Sun" | 2024 | — | Straight Into the Sun |

== Awards and nominations ==
=== APRA Music Awards ===
The APRA Music Awards were established by Australasian Performing Right Association (APRA) in 1982 to honour the achievements of songwriters and music composers, and to recognise their song writing skills, sales and airplay performance, by its members annually.

| Year | Nominee / work | Award | Result | Ref. |
|---|---|---|---|---|
| 2026 | "Straight Into the Sun" by The Cruel Sea (Tex Perkins / Daniel Atkins / Kristyna Higgins) | Most Performed Blues & Roots Work | Nominated | |

=== ARIA Awards ===
The ARIA Music Awards are presented annually from 1987 by the Australian Recording Industry Association (ARIA). The Cruel Sea has won eight awards from twenty nominations.

| Year | Nominee / work | Award | Result |
|---|---|---|---|
| 1993 | This Is Not the Way Home | Best Group | Nominated |
| 1994 | "The Honeymoon Is Over" | Song of the Year | Won |
| 1994 | "The Honeymoon Is Over" | Single of the Year | Won |
| 1994 | "The Honeymoon Is Over" (Andrew Dominik) | Best Video | Nominated |
| 1994 | "Black Stick" | Song the Year | Nominated |
| 1994 | The Honeymoon Is Over | Album of the Year | Won |
| 1994 | The Honeymoon Is Over | Best Group | Won |
| 1994 | The Honeymoon Is Over | Best Alternative Release | Nominated |
| 1994 | The Honeymoon Is Over | Best Cover Art | Nominated |
| 1994 | The Honeymoon Is Over | Producer of the Year | Won |
| 1995 | Three Legged Dog | Best Group | Won |
| 1995 | Three Legged Dog | Album of the Year | Nominated |
| 1995 | Three Legged Dog | Highest Selling Album | Nominated |
| 1995 | The Cruel Sea, Kristyna Higgins, Jim Paton – Three Legged Dog | Best Cover Art | Nominated |
| 1995 | Tony Cohen, Paul McKercher – Three Legged Dog | Engineer of the Year | Won |
| 1995 | Tony Cohen – Three Legged Dog | Producer of the Year | Won |
| 1996 | "Too Fast for Me" (Robbie Douglas-Turner) | Best Video | Nominated |
| 1998 | "Takin' All Day" (Mark Hartley) | Best Video | Nominated |
| 1998 | "Hard Times" – Daniel Denholm, Phil McKellar | Producer of the Year | Nominated |
| 1999 | "You'll Do" (Andrew Dominik) | Best Video | Nominated |

=== Mo Awards ===
The Australian Entertainment Mo Awards (commonly known informally as the Mo Awards), were annual Australian entertainment industry awards. They recognise achievements in live entertainment in Australia from 1975 to 2016. The Cruel Sea won one award in that time.

| Year | Nominee / work | Award | Result (wins only) |
|---|---|---|---|
| 1994 | The Cruel Sea | Rock Performer of the Year | Won |
