= James Cruickshank =

Australian musician

- Born: James George Watson; 1962; Melbourne, Victoria, Australia
- Origin: Sydney, New South Wales, Australia
- Died: 8 October 2015 (aged 53) Bangalow, New South Wales, Australia
- Genres: Indie rock
- Occupation: Musician
- Instruments: Guitar; keyboards; vocals
- Years active: 1985–2015
- Label: Vitamin

James George Watson, who performed as James Cruickshank (1962 – 8 October 2015), was an Australian musician. He was the long-term guitarist and keyboardist for indie rock group, the Cruel Sea. As a solo artist he released three albums, Hymn for Her (2003), Hello Human (2007) and Note to Self (2011). In 2014 he was diagnosed with bowel cancer and died in the following year, aged 53.

== Biography ==
James George Watson was born in 1962 in Melbourne and grew up with two siblings. His mother, Margaret Cruickshank, was a television actress – he used her last name as his performance name. He received music lessons and performed classical music while at primary school. After secondary education he worked as a labourer. At 23 he relocated to Sydney where he completed a degree course in Communications and started in a band, Gargoyles.

In 1987 Cruickshank, on guitar, keyboards and vocals, was a founding member of Sydney-based indie rock band, Widdershins, along with Greg Appel on vocals and guitar, Peter Timmerman on drums, Barry Turnbull on bass guitar and Juliet Ward on vocals. They released a full-length album, Ascension, in May 1989 before breaking up later that year. Cruickshank and Ward then formed Juliet Hammerhead and Friends. He played with Neil Murray and the Rainmakers during 1989, and was a member of the Blackeyed Susans in 1991, appearing on their extended play, Anchor Me. He also guested on several releases by Bughouse.

Cruickshank, on keyboards, guitar and backing vocals, joined another Sydney-based indie rock band, the Cruel Sea, in 1989. Whille attending the group's gigs at the Landsdowne Hotel, he had "started getting up with the band, only to lend the occasional hand on keyboards" before he formally joined. The line-up included Jim Eliott on drums, Ken Gormly on bass guitar, Tex Perkins on lead vocals, harmonica and guitar and Dan Rumour on guitar.

He remained with the Cruel Sea until they broke up in 2003, and reunited with them to tour in 2008 and again in 2010. He also played with Cruel Sea bandmate, Perkins, as a member of the Cruel Three (1992), then Tex Perkins and His Ladyboyz (2008) and appeared on Tex Perkins and the Dark Horses's self-titled album.

Cruickshank released three solo albums through Vitamin Records, Hymn for Her (2003), Hello Human (2007) and Note to Self (2011), and toured nationally to support them. James Cruickshank died on 8 October 2015, a year after being diagnosed with bowel cancer.

== Discography ==
- Hymn for Her (2003) - Vitamin
- Hello Human (2007) - Vitamin
- Note to Self (2011) - Vitamin

Tex Perkins and His Ladyboyz

- No. 1's & No. 2's (2008) - Universal

The Cruel Sea

- See The Cruel Sea Discography

The Blackeyed Susans

- Anchor Me EP (1991) - Waterfront Records

Widdershins

- Ascension (1989) - Waterfront Records
- Good Songs 1987-1989 (2005) - Egg Records
- "Now You Know / Dishwashing Liquid" (1987) - Waterfront Records
- Bottle Man's Wife EP (1988) - Waterfront Records
- "Return of the King" / "Bugle Call" (1989) - Waterfront Records
- "Now You Know" (2006) - Egg Records
