= Harry was a Bad Bugger =

Song by Tex, Don and Charlie
- Released: September 2005
- Studio: Electric Avenue Studios
- Label: Universal Music Australia
- Songwriter: Walker

"Harry was a Bad Bugger" is a 2005 song from Australian band Tex, Don and Charlie. It was written by band member Don Walker.

== Background ==
Tex, Don and Charlie are an Australian band. Initially formed for an acoustic performance on alternative radio station JJJ, they were all well known in the Australian music industry. Walker had been in Cold Chisel, Perkins was in the Cruel Sea and Beasts of Bourbon, and Owen was a sought-after guitarist who had been in the New Christs. They released their first album, Sad but True in 1993, and a follow-up All Is Forgiven in 2005.

Walker later said of the song "Harry was a Bad Bugger", "The subject matter is a combination of three blokes that I knew when I was young in Grafton. These were older guys who were part of the bodgie generation who had washed up in regional Australia. Guys who were five or ten years older than me and are cunning as all fuck, never short of money but never have any visible means of support, utterly ruthless with anybody around them, and devastatingly attractive because of that." He said it was written "quite quickly, over a few afternoons, and very enjoyable to write."

== Reception ==
Chris Johnston in The Age said, "I'd possibly go so far as to cite Don Walker's "Harry Was a Bad Bugger" - a Slim Dusty meets Wolf Creek kind of tune - as the Australian song of the year: '...he was dumped out off Coffs Harbour/shackled to a fridge ...'" Mess & Noise called it, "one of the finest Australian compositions of the last 20 years", and The West Australian said it was "a lyrical masterpiece which clings to Paul Kelly's credo of letting the part tell the whole.".

Author Angela Savage listed it as one of her favourite crime stories in a song, saying, "Don Walker: Harry was 'a bad bugger all the way' but the aggrieved small town local who narrates this song eventually gets his revenge."

The Guardian noted Walker's singing: "Actually it's more like a narration – to do full justice to eponymous rogue in "Harry Was A Bad Bugger". It's a wonderful tale" BMA Magazine said, "the mysterious spoken-word song was magnificent. With Don Walker's twang echoing through the theatre, it was almost like watching a Tarantino film come to life." Trouble described it as, "One of the stronger examples of his story-strong work. He has an effective talent for creating a serious mood and thus a dark subtext emerges in his pieces."

== Jeff Lang ==
Lang released a version on his album Carried in Mind. He said, "I rang Don up and said 'Mind if I sing that?' It was a little bit intimidating after Tex, Don and Charlie had done it.
