= The Best of Tex Perkins =

The Best of Tex Perkins: Songs From My Black Cattle Dog

Greatest hits album by Tex Perkins
- Released: August 2009
- Length: 80:06
- Label: Universal Music Australia

Tex Perkins chronology
| Beautiful Kate (2009) | The Best of Tex Perkins: Songs From My Black Cattle Dog (2009) | Tex Perkins & The Dark Horses (2011) |

The Best of Tex Perkins: Songs from My Black Cattle Dog is a greatest hits album by Australian singer-songwriter Tex Perkins. The album includes solo tracks as well as The Cruel Sea and Tex, Don and Charlie tracks and was released in August 2009. The album was supported by a national tour.

The title Songs from My Black Cattle Dog is a creative blunder when someone misheard Tex saying songs from "my back catalogue".

== Critical reception ==
Lyn Harder from The Dwarf said "Have you been thinking of getting a Tex Perkins record but not sure which one to get? Well, this album is for you." adding "This is Tex revealing certain aspects of his life as well as certain philosophical grabs of his life. Tex did choose the songs for this best of compilation and he says they are self analytical and rather honest in lyric content."

Iain Shedden from The Australian said "The best-of collection ... focuses largely on his balladeering solo output. It represents a large and impressive body of work that has earned plenty of plaudits, albeit without troubling the charts."

== Track listing ==
| No. | Title | Writer(s) | Album | Length |
|---|---|---|---|---|
| 1. | "What I Done to Her" (Tex, Don and Charlie) | Tex Perkins; Charlie Owen | Sad But True | 4:22 |
| 2. | "I Know You Know I Know" | Perkins | Dark Horses | 4:31 |
| 3. | "Whenever It Snows" (Tex, Don & Charlie) | Murray Paterson; Perkins | All Is Forgiven | 4:41 |
| 4. | "She Speaks a Different Language" | Perkins | Dark Horses | 4:45 |
| 5. | "Half of Nothing" (with Tim Rogers [as TnT]) | | My Better Half | 4:46 |
| 6. | "Changelings" (with Dark Horses) | Perkins; Patterson; Owen | Sweet Nothing | 4:30 |
| 7. | "Ice in the Sun" | Perkins; Paterson | Dark Horses | 5:55 |
| 8. | "Lucid" (with Dark Horses) | Perkins; Patterson | Sweet Nothing | 4:24 |
| 9. | "I Don't Worry Anymore" (The Cruel Sea) | | Where There's Smoke | 3:52 |
| 10. | "A Place to Hide" (Tex, Don & Charlie) | Perkins | All Is Forgiven | 3:12 |
| 11. | "It Won't Last" (The Cruel Sea) | Perkins; Dan Rumour | The Most | 3:15 |
| 12. | "Anybody But You" (The Cruel Sea) | Perkins | Three Legged Dog | 3:56 |
| 13. | "Please Break Me Gently" | Perkins | Dark Horses | 2:51 |
| 14. | "Paycheques" (Tex, Don & Charlie) | Owen; Don Walker; Paterson; Perkins | All Is Forgiven | 4:30 |
| 15. | "Fake That Emotion" (Tex, Don & Charlie) | Perkins; Glenn Dormand | Sad But True | 5:49 |
| 16. | "Real Love" | Perkins | Far Be It From Me | 3:44 |
| 17. | "Still the Same" (Tex, Don & Charlie) | Perkins | Sad But True | 3:17 |
| 18. | "The Singer of the Song" (Tex, Don & Charlie) | Paterson; Perkins | All Is Forgiven | 4:49 |

== Charts ==
Chart performance for The Best of Tex Perkins
| Chart (2009) | Peak position |
|---|---|
| Australian Albums (ARIA) | 95 |

== Release history ==
| Region | Date | Format | Edition(s) | Label | Catalogue |
|---|---|---|---|---|---|
| Australia | August 2009 | CD | Standard | Universal Music Australia | 2715178 |
