= Sweet Nothing (album) =

Studio album by Tex Perkins' Dark Horses
- Released: July 2003
- Length: 46:50
- Label: Universal Music Australia
- Producer: Dark Horses

Tex Perkins chronology
Dark Horses (2000)	Sweet Nothing (2003)	My Better Half (2006)

Sweet Nothing is the third studio album by Australian singer-songwriter Tex Perkins, and first credited to Tex Perkins' Dark Horses. The album was released in July 2003 and peaked at number 34 on the ARIA Charts.

== Critical reception ==
Professional ratings
Review scores
Source	Rating
The Age	4/5 stars
The Sydney Morning Herald	4/5 stars

The Sydney Morning Herald said "Perkins has swapped the rock'n'roll swagger of his earlier days for evocative poetry, such as that found on the chorus of track two 'Tonight we swim in midnight sunshine'. What's surprising is that his rough rumble of a voice is so suited to restraint."

The Age said "Perkins' smoky, cracked voice is at its best out in front... but generally it serves as an accompaniment to the lush instrumentation, particularly Charlie Owen's dobro, lap steel and shimmering keyboards, and is complemented by Silbersher's falsetto backing vocals. Owen and Silbersher are the masters of understatement; they know as much as anyone that what you don't do is as important as what you do. The songs, recorded on Perkins' mobile recording system at his rural property, retain their intimacy, so much so that you can hear breathing and, almost, thoughts." calling the album "A sublime winter album to get lost in."

== Track listing ==
No.	Title	Writer(s)	Length
1.	"A Hair of the God"	Dark Horses	3:03
2.	"Midnight Sunshine"	Murray Paterson; Tex Perkins	3:17
3.	"Lucid"	Paterson; Perkins	4:36
4.	"Cold Feet"	Charlie Owen; Perkins; Joel Silbersher	3:48
5.	"Great Apes"	Dark Horses	4:48
6.	"Changelings"	Owen; Paterson; Perkins	4:30
7.	"Days Like These"	Paterson; Perkins	4:14
8.	"Hang on to My Love"	Dark Horses	4:30
9.	"This Wind"	Paterson; Perkins	4:03
10.	"A Name on Every One"	Owen; Paterson; Perkins	6:50
11.	"Everything or Nothing"	Perkins	4:39
Total length:			46:50

== Personnel ==
- Tex Perkins – vocals, acoustic guitar
- Charlie Owen – dobro, lap steel, electric, keyboards
- Murray Paterson – acoustic guitar
- Joel Silbersher – bass
- Richard Needham – backing vocals, drums

== Charts ==
Chart (2003)	Peak position
Australian Albums (ARIA)	34

== Release history ==
Release history and formats for Sweet Nothing
Region	Date	Format	Label	Catalogue
Australia	July 2003	CD; LP	Universal Music Australia	0384962
