= Dark Horses (Tex Perkins album) =

Studio album by Tex Perkins
- Released: July 2000
- Studio: Fortissimo Studios
- Label: Slick, Grudge Records Australia
- Producer: Charlie Owen

Tex Perkins chronology
| Far Be It from Me (1996) | Dark Horses (2000) | Sweet Nothing (2003) |

Dark Horses is the second solo studio album by Australian singer-songwriter Tex Perkins. The album was released in July 2000 and peaked at number 24 on the ARIA Charts.

The album was re-released in 2001 with a bonus 6-track live disc recorded Live at the Wireless and Live at the Laundry in September 2000.

== Track listing ==
| No. | Title | Writer(s) | Length |
|---|---|---|---|
| 1. | "To Us" | James Cruickshank; Charlie Owen; Tex Perkins | 4:17 |
| 2. | "I Know Y'know I Know" | Perkins | 4:30 |
| 3. | "Please Break Me Gently" | Perkins | 2:51 |
| 4. | "She Speaks a Different Language" | Perkins | 4:45 |
| 5. | "Fine Mess" | Murray Paterson; Perkins | 4:31 |
| 6. | "All You Need Is Sleep" | Perkins; Joel Silbersher | 4:06 |
| 7. | "Blissfully Blind" | Rowland S. Howard; Perkins | 4:14 |
| 8. | "Will It Away" | Perkins; Silbersher | 3:42 |
| 9. | "Ice in the Sun" | Paterson; Perkins | 5:56 |
| 10. | "All Over The World Tonight" | Perkins | 3:55 |
| 11. | "Another Rain Song..." | Perkins | 2:41 |

2001 Bonus Disc Long Night of the Dark Horses
| No. | Title | Writer(s) | Length |
|---|---|---|---|
| 1. | "Can't Say No" | Spencer Jones; Tex Perkins | 4:56 |
| 2. | "This Is Forever" | Kristyna Higgins; Perkins | 4:21 |
| 3. | "Her Own Life" | Perkins | 3:16 |
| 4. | "What I Done To Her" | Owens; Perkins | 4:31 |
| 5. | "Still The Same" | Perkins | 4:21 |
| 6. | "Splendid Lie" | Perkins | 4:07 |

== Charts ==
| Chart (2000) | Peak position |
|---|---|
| Australian Albums (ARIA) | 24 |

== Release history ==
| Region | Date | Format | Edition(s) | Label | Catalogue |
|---|---|---|---|---|---|
| Australia | July 2000 | CD | Standard | Slick, Grudge Records Australia | 1592612 |
| Australia | 2001 | 2x CD | Bonus Disc Edition | Slick, Grudge | 0135942 |
