= Broken Head =

Australian musical group

- Origin: Brisbane, Queensland, Australia
- Genres: Dub
- Years active: 1996–present
- Label: Valve/East West
- Members: Ben Ely; Skritch; Guy Webster

Broken Head (also styled as Brokenhead) is a dub band from Brisbane, Queensland, which was formed after a six-hour jam session in 1996 by Regurgitator's Ben Ely on bass guitar, Skritch from Gota Cola on drums and Guy Webster on guitar.

The group issued their debut album, Locarno, on 1 September 2000 via Valve Records/East West as a single CD and also as an extended edition including a bonus disc, Remember to Breathe, of live material. It was co-produced by Ely, Skritch and Webster with Magoo (Regurgitator).

Soon after the group was put "on ice for most of the last few years while the individual members pursued other projects" until November 2006. Webster explained, "It was something we always understood with this band, that there will be times when it will have to be more infrequent. We always agreed, this is a band that we're going to be playing in for the rest of our lives, so we’ll always be around."

== Members ==
- Ben Ely (Regurgitator, Pangaea, The Stalkers, Jump 2 Light Speed)
- Skritch (The Long Johns, Tex Perkins' Dark Horses, Gota Cola, Mary Trembles)
- Guy Webster (The Fabulous Nobodies)

== Discography ==
- Locarno (2000) - Valve/East West
