= Little Animals =

Studio album by Beasts of Bourbon
- Released: 2007
- Studio: Newmarket Studios, North Melbourne
- Genre: Rock
- Language: English
- Producer: Skritch, Beasts of Bourbon

Beasts of Bourbon chronology
Low Life (2005)	Little Animals (2007)

Little Animals is the sixth studio album by the Australian rock band Beasts of Bourbon, released in 2007. A video was released for "I Don't Care About Nothing Anymore". The album was dedicated to Ian Rilen.

== Track listing ==
1. "I Don't Care About Nothing Anymore" (Brian Hooper, Charlie Owen, Tex Perkins)
2. "I Am Gone" (Owen, Spencer P. Jones, Perkins, Tony Pola)
3. "I Told You So" (Hooper, Owen, Jones)
4. "Master and Slave" (Perkins)
5. "Little Animals" (Jones, Perkins)
6. "The Beast I Came to Be" (Jones)
7. "Sleepwalker" (Jones, Perkins, Pola)
8. "Too Much Too Late" (Hooper, Owen, Perkins)
9. "New Day of the Dead" (Jones)
10. "Thanks" (Jones)

== Personnel ==
The Beasts of Bourbon

- Tex Perkins - vocals
- Charlie Owen - guitar
- Spencer P. Jones - guitar
- Brian Hooper - bass
- Tony Pola - drums
