= You Don't Know Lonely =

Studio album by Tex, Don and Charlie
- Released: 30 June 2017
- Genres: folk blues, country
- Label: Universal
- Producers: Tex, Don and Charlie

Tex, Don and Charlie chronology
All Is Forgiven (2005)	You Don't Know Lonely (2017)

You Don't Know Lonely is the third studio album by Australian rock band Tex, Don and Charlie. It was released in June 2017 and debuted at number 14 on the Australian charts.

== Details ==
You Don't Know Lonely was released 12 years after Tex, Don & Charlie's last album, which was released 12 years after their debut. The album was delayed by the death of Shane Walsh from a heroin overdose in 2011. Owen said, "It honestly wasn't supposed to take another 12 years. We lost our good friend Shane Walsh – a brilliant double-bass player and one of the great Melbourne personalities. He was integral to Tex, Don and Charlie – and when he passed away, we were already sharing songs around. That all came to a halt – it was really hard to start again in the wake of his passing." Walker added, "It was quite painful for us, particularly Charlie, to think about doing something without Shane for a while."

In Walsh's absence, Steve Hadley, who had previously been with Paul Kelly and The Black Sorrows, played bass. Original drummer Jim White was also unable to join due to, "getting more and more busy with an international career." Charley Drayton, who had replaced Steve Prestwich in Walker's Cold Chisel, joined the band on drums. Walker said, "“When you change a drummer, that fundamentally changes everything in a group, in ways that are not easy to describe in English – but they are enormously evident sitting on stage or in a studio." Garret Costigan, a regular in Walker's bands, returned on pedal steel. Demos were recorded in Goonengerry before studio recording in Sydney.

As with the previous two albums, Walker wrote just over half the songs, and Perkins just under. Walker said, "I throw a lot of songs into the hat. We go through them. The definition of a TDC song of mine is one that Tex and Charlie like. They are very discerning." Perkins added, "Don usually has a stockpile of songs, one of these songs is about eight years old, and I also have a song in this album that is about eight years old. Don normally presents us with songs he thinks Charlie and I are going to like. Sometimes he is wrong."

In the song "A Man In Conflict With Nature", the narrator spends his dog-racing winnings on "three hookers and some sushi". Author Perkins admitted, "I was trying to out-Don Don in that song. My ambition with that song was to please Don and, I have to say, he was very pleased. I got open laughter from him, not just a smirk and a snigger. He didn’t bring so much sleaze this time, so it was up to me."

Walker had been working on the song "Plan B" for about 12 years. Having written "pages and pages", and unable to finish it, he took the song to Terry Radigan, who came up with the opening lines, "Bass drum, empty stage/women of a certain age". Walker said, "For some reason it was that little click where everything falls into place."

== Reception ==
Rolling Stone Australia said the album was, "a damn near cinematic listening experience. It’s filled with characters living on the margins, stumbling from one self-created mess to the next."

The Sydney Morning Herald noted, "given their earlier work, this was always going to be a sombre set, regardless: it's based on their usual stories of characters existing on the fringes, living with regrets and coping with loss, and it mostly delivers. You Don't Know Lonely rewards in time."

The Guardian said the album, "challenges us to consider what we know about diving into the depths of the human soul. It can be a bit uncomfortable at times." Musically, it said, "You could call it blues – and it certainly has more than a hint of country with that pedal steel and occasional dobro – but let’s just call it a magnificent slab of Australiana."

== Track listing ==
No.	Title	Writer(s)	Length
1.	"What I Am"	Walker
2.	"A Man In Conflict With Nature"	Perkins/Murray Paterson
3.	"Here's As Good As Anywhere"	Walker
4.	"Summer"	Walker/Philipp Kelber
5.	"Just Your Luck"	Walker
6.	"I Couldn't Lie"	Perkins/Murray Paterson
7.	"Plan B"	Walker/Terry Radigan
8.	"One Step Ahead Of The Blues"	Perkins/Owen
9.	"The Hitcher"	Walker
10.	"I Used To Be"	Perkins
11.	"One More For The Song"	Perkins/Jane Barnes
12.	"How Good Is Life"	Walker

== Charts ==
Chart (2017)	Peak position
Australian Albums (ARIA)	14

== Release history ==
Region	Date	Format	Label	Catalogue
Australia	20 June 2017	CD, streaming	EMI Music Australia	5768319
Australia	20 June 2017	Vinyl	EMI Music Australia	5768318

== Personnel ==
- Tex Perkins – vocals, guitar
- Don Walker – vocals, keyboards
- Charlie Owen – guitar, dobro, lap steel
- Steve Hadley – bass
- Charley Drayton – drums
- Garrett Costigan – pedal steel guitar
