= Mary Trembles =

Australian rock band

- Origin: Brisbane, Queensland, Australia
- Genres: Rock
- Years active: 2005–present
- Members: Skritch
- Past members: Damon Cox; Duey Coert; Matt Tanner

Mary Trembles is an Australian rock band from Brisbane, Queensland formed by Damon Cox and Skritch in Los Angeles in 2005. Returning to Brisbane they recruited Duey Coert to complete the line-up. The first track, "Scene From Below", from their 2006 mini album ps...situation was on high rotation on Triple J and the band was a Triple J Next Crop artist in November 2006. Matt Tanner replaced Coert and the band followed the ep up with a full-length album Borrowed Ears, Borrowed Eyes, recorded by Jeff Lovejoy and mixed by Mike Major (At the Drive In, Sparta).

== Members ==
- Skritch (Tex Perkins' Dark Horses, Gota Cola, Broken Head)
- Damon Cox (Intercooler, An Horse)
- Duey Coert (Raised By Wolves)
- Matt Tanner (Giants of Science)

== Discography ==
- ps...situation ep (2006) - Plus One Records
- Borrowed Ears, Borrowed Eyes (2008) - Plus One Records
