= Beautiful Kate =

2009 Australian film by Rachel Ward

- Theatrical release poster
- Directed by: Rachel Ward
- Screenplay by: Rachel Ward
- Based on: Beautiful Kate by Newton Thornburg
- Produced by: Bryan Brown; Leah Churchill-Brown
- Starring: Ben Mendelsohn; Bryan Brown; Maeve Dermody; Sophie Lowe; Rachel Griffiths
- Cinematography: Andrew Commis
- Edited by: Veronika Jenet
- Music by: Tex Perkins; Murray Paterson
- Distributed by: Roadshow Entertainment
- Release date: 6 August 2009
- Running time: 101 minutes
- Country: Australia
- Language: English
- Box office: $1 million

Beautiful Kate is a 2009 Australian drama film directed by Rachel Ward and starring Ben Mendelsohn, Rachel Griffiths, Bryan Brown, Maeve Dermody and Sophie Lowe.

The film premiered in June 2009 at the Sydney Film Festival and was released in limited release across Australia on 6 August 2009.

== Plot ==
Writer Ned Kendall is returning to the remote and isolated family home inhabited by his sister Sally, to say goodbye to his father, Bruce, who is dying. Ned also brings his fiancée, Toni, who has trouble getting used to the isolation and harshness of rural Australia.

Ned starts reliving memories of his childhood, many involving his beautiful twin sister Kate, and his older brother Cliff. These memories awaken long-buried secrets from the family's past. He begins writing, and his fiancée reads that he had an awkward sexual encounter with Kate, and leaves him without giving him a chance to explain.

Kate continues to entice Ned despite his obvious revulsion, and after a drunken night out with friends, Ned goes for a swim in the family dam. He is joined by Kate, who seduces and subsequently has sex with him on the banks of the dam. Ned shows immediate remorse while Kate remains unperturbed.

After Ned's refusal to have further sexual relations with Kate, Kate instigates a fight between the brothers by suggesting that Ned made unwanted advances towards her. As punishment, Bruce makes Ned accompany Kate to the Christmas dance. During the dance, Ned leaves Kate, and she is left to go home with Cliff. Ned leaves separately and on his way home he finds his sister's dead body in Cliff's crashed car, and then finds that Cliff has hanged himself.

Fearing that Ned will tell Bruce the truth about Kate, Sally reveals that she knew of Ned and Kate's secret. She also reveals that the car's clock stopped on impact of the crash and no one could figure out what took Kate and Cliff so long to get home from the dance. Sally speculates that Kate also had sexual relations with Cliff, who then crashed the car in which Kate died. She tells Ned she believes that Cliff's guilt from his part in Kate's death was multiplied knowing he had committed incest. But Bruce still believes that Kate was an innocent victim, the best of his children, and she doesn't want him shattered with the truth.

Ned then makes amends with Bruce and says that he is sorry for blaming him over Cliff's suicide. He doesn't tell Bruce the truth about Kate and lets him die still believing that Kate was everything he thought she was. Before he leaves, he tells Sally that Bruce died never knowing that she was his greatest achievement.

== Cast ==
- Ben Mendelsohn as Ned Kendall
- Rachel Griffiths as Sally Kendall
- Bryan Brown as Bruce Kendall
- Sophie Lowe as Kate Kendall
- Maeve Dermody as Toni
- Josh McFarlane as Cliff Kendall
- Scott O'Donnell as Young Ned
- Heloise Baker as Young Sally

== Production ==
Writer and director Rachel Ward adapted the script from a 1982 novel of the same name by Newton Thornburg; this was the first novel by Thornburg used for a movie since Cutter's Way (1981).

The film was shot on location in the Flinders Ranges.

== Release ==
Beautiful Kate premiered in June 2009 at the Sydney Film Festival, screened at the Antipodean Film Festival in Saint Tropez, France, in October 2010, and was released in 29 cinemas in Australia on 6 August 2009.

== Reception ==
=== Box office ===
Beautiful Kate was and grossed $1,065,656 at the box office. Until the debut of the Paul Hogan-starring Charlie & Boots in early September, Beautiful Kate held the title of the largest opening weekend for an Australian film for 2009.

=== Critical response ===
On Rotten Tomatoes the film holds an 87% approval rating based on reviews from 30 critics, with an average rating of 6.8 out of 10.

Beautiful Kate received four and a half stars from both Margaret Pomeranz and David Stratton on At The Movies. Sandra Hall of The Sydney Morning Herald rated it four and a half stars out of five and wrote, "At times the action slows to the point where escape seems the most enticing option. Don't take it, for Ward's tough-minded and uniquely Australian version of Southern Gothic does reward your perseverance by at last making you care." Richard Kuipers of Variety called it "a visually beautiful and emotionally rewarding study of a dying patriarch and his estranged son". Megan Lehmann of The Hollywood Reporter described it as "a provocative slice of Southern Gothic refried Aussie-style". Frank Hatherley of Screen Daily wrote that it is a "handsome and intense love story" that is "awash with Ward's own spiky, brittle dialogue, delivered with relish by her cast". Philip French of The Guardian wrote, "The film is well acted but both blunt and awkward." Also writing in The Guardian, Steve Rose rated it two out of four stars and said that it "doesn't do a great deal wrong, but despite broaching taboo subjects, feels too arthouse-by-numbers".

=== Awards ===
| Award | Category | Subject | Result |
|---|---|---|---|
| AACTA Awards (2009 AFI Awards) | Best Film | Bryan Brown | Nominated |
| AACTA Awards (2009 AFI Awards) | Best Film | Leah Churchill-Brown | Nominated |
| AACTA Awards (2009 AFI Awards) | Best Direction | Rachel Ward | Nominated |
| AACTA Awards (2009 AFI Awards) | Best Adapted Screenplay | Rachel Ward | Nominated |
| AACTA Awards (2009 AFI Awards) | Best Actor | Ben Mendelsohn | Nominated |
| AACTA Awards (2009 AFI Awards) | Best Actress | Sophie Lowe | Nominated |
| AACTA Awards (2009 AFI Awards) | Best Supporting Actor | Bryan Brown | Nominated |
| AACTA Awards (2009 AFI Awards) | Best Supporting Actress | Maeve Dermody | Nominated |
| AACTA Awards (2009 AFI Awards) | Best Supporting Actress | Rachel Griffiths | Won |
| AACTA Awards (2009 AFI Awards) | Best Cinematography | Andrew Commis | Nominated |
| Australian Cinematographers Society | Cinematographer of the Year | Andrew Commis | Won |
| Australian Cinematographers Society | Golden Tripod | Andrew Commis | Won |
| ADG Award | Best Direction in a Feature Film | Rachel Ward | Nominated |
| Antipodean Film Festival Awards | Jury Grand Prix, Best Feature film | Film | Won |
| ASE Award | Best Editing on a Feature Film | Veronika Jenet | Nominated |
| FCCA Awards | Best Film | Bryan Brown | Nominated |
| FCCA Awards | Best Film | Leah Churchill-Brown | Nominated |
| FCCA Awards | Best Director | Rachel Ward | Nominated |
| FCCA Awards | Best Actor – Male | Ben Mendelsohn | Nominated |
| FCCA Awards | Best Supporting Actor – Male | Bryan Brown | Won |
| FCCA Awards | Best Supporting Actor – Female | Maeve Dermody | Nominated |
| FCCA Awards | Best Supporting Actor – Female | Rachel Griffiths | Won |
| FCCA Awards | Best Supporting Actor – Female | Sophie Lowe | Nominated |
| FCCA Awards | Best Cinematography | Andrew Commis | Nominated |
| FCCA Awards | Best Music Score | Tex Perkins | Nominated |
| Inside Film Awards | Best Direction | Rachel Ward | Nominated |
| Inside Film Awards | Best Cinematography | Andrew Commis | Won |
| Inside Film Awards | Best Editing | Veronika Jenet | Nominated |
| Palm Springs International Film Festival | New Voices/New Visions Grand Jury Prize | Rachel Ward | Nominated |
| Sydney Film Festival | Best Film | Rachel Ward | Nominated |

== Soundtrack ==
Beautiful Kate

Soundtrack album by Tex Perkins and Murray Paterson
- Released: 14 August 2009
- Recorded: Nashua Road
- Label: Level Two Music

Tex Perkins chronology
| No. 1's & No. 2's (2008) | Beautiful Kate (2009) | The Best of Tex Perkins: Songs from My Black Cattle Dog (2009) |

=== Track listing ===
1. "Beautiful Kate (Main Theme)" - 3:20
2. "Wilpena Pound" - 1:45
3. "The Shed" - 0:33
4. "Weeping Windmill" - 2:32
5. "The Old School Room" - 1:10
6. "The Memory" - 1:18
7. "Room Service" - 1:33
8. "Beautiful Kate (Kiss and Make Up)" - 0:59
9. "The Chase" - 2:23
10. "Ned Walks Back" - 1:28
11. "Always On My Mind"/"Finding Kate" (with Blind Dog Taylor and One More Mile) - 3:01
12. "Beautiful Kate (The Dam)" - 1:04
13. "You're Not Gonna Tell Him Are You?" - 1:16
14. "Forgiveness" - 0:57
15. "Washing Bruce" - 1:46
16. "Beautiful Kate (Goodbye)" - 1:17
17. "This Little Bird" - 1:58
18. "Closing Titles (Remembering Russell Dunlop)" - 5:34
- All tracks written and performed by Tex Perkins and Murray Paterson, except track 11 which was written by Johnny Christopher, Mark James, Wayne Carson Thompson, Perkins and Paterson and track 17 which was written by John D. Loudermilk.

== See also ==
- Cinema of Australia
