= Intercooler (band) =

Australian musical group

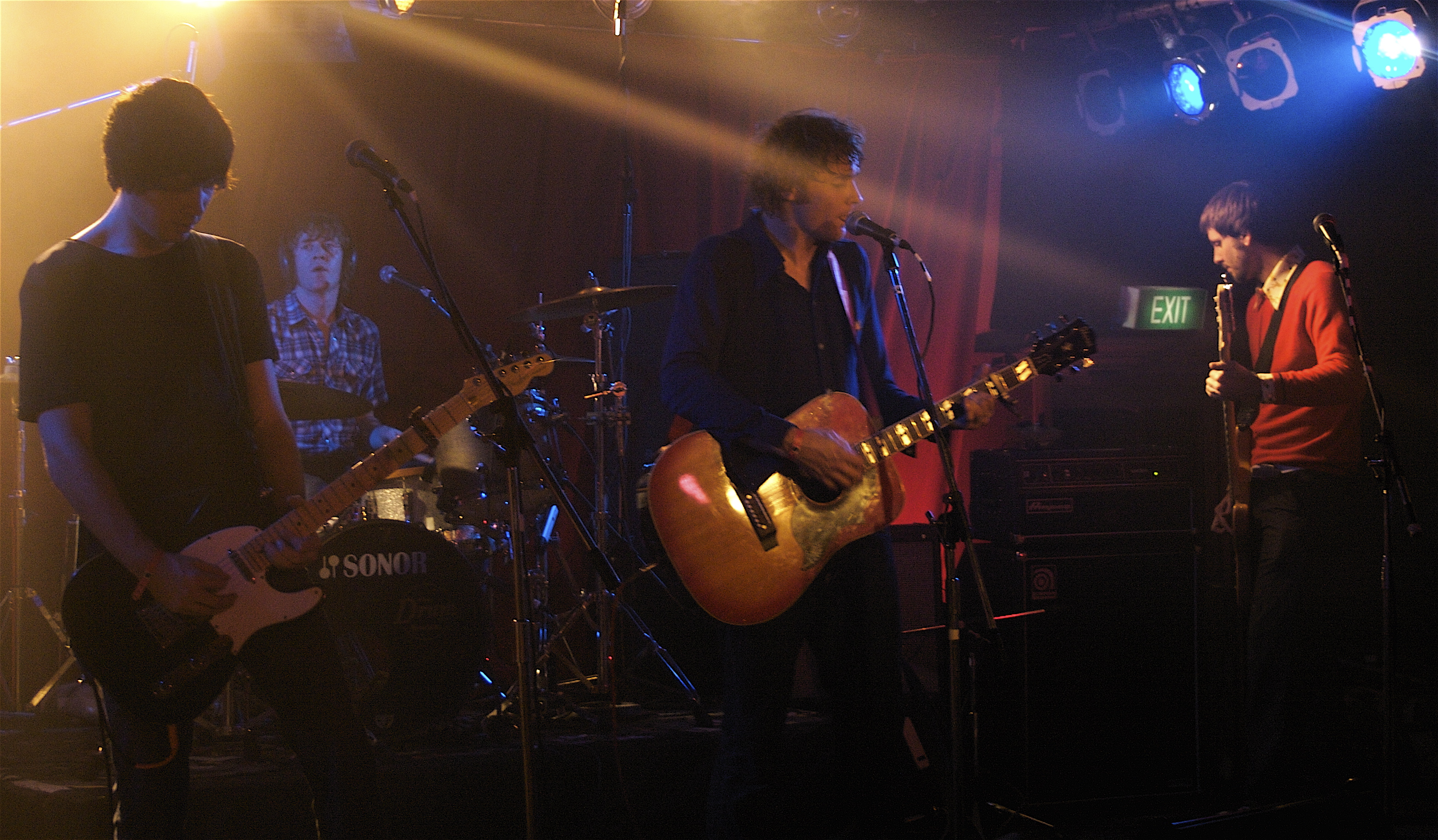
- 2007 performance at the Annandale hotel

Background information
- Origin: Brisbane, Queensland, Australia
- Genre: Rock
- Years active: 2001–present
- Labels: Rhythm Ace/MGM Distribution; Plus One/Shock Records; Silent Echo
- Members: Joel Potter; Phil Ballantyne; Damon Cox; Michael Caso; Darek Mudge

Intercooler is a rock band from Brisbane, Australia.

== Biography ==
Intercooler was formed by members of a Sunshine Coast band named Uncle Extacy, originally beginning in 1992. They have released four full-length albums – Old School Is The New School (released 2002, and re-issued, with a different track listing, in 2006), Forever Or Whatever (released in 2007), and Time To Let Go (released September 2011) and Read the Room (released 2021). Intercooler have also released two EPs – Goodness of the Girl, and Dance of a Thousand Promises (2004).

Intercooler’s history in the 90s went through a few incarnations. In 2001, the long standing lineup formed that went on to record 4 albums and tour for better part of a decade. Joel and Phil returned from a travel stint & spent most of year 2000 living in London. On return to Australia, Damon Cox paired up with already established butat the time dormant songwriting trio Phil Ballantyne, Joel Potter and Michael Caso (later replaced by Darek Mudge of Screamfeeder).

After completing their first album, Intercooler toured up and down the east coast of their home country of Australia, playing shows with the likes of The Casanovas, Dallas Crane, Peabody, Grinspoon, The Living End and claiming prime international support slots with Teenage Fanclub, Buzzcocks, J Mascis, Gomez, Maxïmo Park, Preston School of Industry and The Delgados.

Four songs from Intercooler's album Old School Is The New School were added to high rotation on national radio network Triple J, including live favourites "Goodness of the Girl" and "Leaflet". Videos were shot for two of the tracks and both enjoyed airplay on ABC's Fly TV, rage and also Channel [V]. Intercooler was responsible for knocking Jennifer Lopez off the pole position on Fly TV's buzz clip of the week, as voted by viewers.

Intercooler continued on to play the Queensland leg of the Big Day Out and Livid music festivals in 2003. Their first U.S. tour commenced in September of the same year. They supported Red Hot Chili Peppers and Queens of the Stone Age at their Washington, D.C. show plus appeared at Wisconsin's renowned Summerjam festival. The tour also included their own club shows in New York City, Chicago, Philadelphia, Atlanta and more.

2004 saw the release of the EP Dance of a Thousand Promises which spent 41 weeks in the top 20 of the Australian Independent Charts and had two songs added to high rotation nationally. Videos for "Cream Puff" and "If I Try" both enjoyed airplay on rage, MTV Australia and Channel [V].

The video for "Carving Others", from their Forever Or Whatever album, was released in February 2007.

Their music video for "You're Not Gonna Hurt Us Again" was a Finalist for 'Best Music Video' at the Australian Effects & Animation Awards. Directed by Michael Ebner the video stars pro skateboarding star, Corbin Harris and screened at Dendy Cinemas, Rage and other music channels.

Between 2010 and 2020,most of the band relocated to Melbourne. Damon began living in New York off the back of several tours with his band, An Horse.

The albums ‘Time to Let Go’ and ‘Read the Room’ were both long running recording projects due to the distance the band would only work at opportunities where they found themselves in the same city. Consequently the sessions for each album have arrangements stretching over several years of the projects.

== Side projects ==
- Darek Mudge played lead guitar for Screamfeeder, one of Brisbane's longest serving bands, from 2000 – 2003 and intermittently thereafter.
- In 2005 Damon Cox co-founded Mary Trembles with Skritch (guitars and vocals) and Duey Coert (bass).
- Beginning 2007 Damon Cox also comprises An Horse along with Kate Cooper of Iron On.

== Discography ==
=== Albums ===
- Old School Is the New School – Rhythm Ace Records / MGM Distribution (2002, re-issued in 2006 with different track listing and bonus tracks)
- Forever or Whatever – Plus One / Shock Records (24 February 2007)
- Time To Let Go – Plus One / Shock Records (20 September 2011)

=== EPs ===
- Dance of a Thousand Promises – Plus One / Shock Records (October 2004).

=== Singles ===
- "Goodness of the Girl" – Rhythm Ace Records / MGM Distribution (September 2002)
- Surfin' – (15 May 2020)
