= Tunnel at the End of the Light =

Studio album by Tex Perkins
- Released: 17 July 2015
- Studio: Tender Trap Studios
- Length: 43:20
- Label: Tex Perkins and the Dark Horses, Inertia

Tex Perkins chronology
Everyone's Alone (2012)	Tunnel at the End of the Light (2015)

Tunnel at the End of the Light is a studio album by Australian singer-songwriter Tex Perkins and the Dark Horses. The album was released in July 2015 and peaked at number 52 on the ARIA Charts.

The Dark Horses are made up of Charlie Owen, Joel Silbersher, Murray Patterson, Stephen Hadley and Gus Agars.

== Critical reception ==
Professional ratings
Review scores
Source	Rating
Sydney Morning Herald	3.5/5 stars
The Guardian	3/5 stars
The Bragg	3/5 stars

Jane Rocca from Sydney Morning Herald said "Tex Perkins trades his signature growl for existential lusting" adding "[it] is dressed in a glorious 1970s reverb and packed with slowed-down riffs. It's held together by a blues enthusiasm and follows 2012's Everyone's Alone."

Everett True from The Guardian said "The album is fine, faultless in a way – languid, regretful and steeped in the lore of the open land, the sound of closing prison gates welcoming in the melancholy title track."

Spencer Scott from The Bragg said "Tunnel at the End of the Light opens with the sounds of an uneasy night in the outback, as a lonesome whistle takes centre stage, rolling through the hills. It instantly takes you back to an old Western, one in which Tex Perkins is more than happy to play the cowboy." adding "Perkins and co. have rustled up another bunch of well-crafted songs."

Leading Edge music described the album as "gently bubbling sonics gurgling underneath spacious rhythms, sweetly simple repetitive guitars, lush backing harmonies and brooding bass lines."

== Track listing ==
No.	Title	Writer(s)	Length
1.	"Oh Lucky Me"	Murray Paterson; Tex Perkins	5:19
2.	"All Is Quiet"	Paterson; Perkins	2:58
3.	"Tunnel at the End of the Light"	Perkins	3:45
4.	"Right Here in Front of You"	Perkins	5:08
5.	"They Shoot Horses, Don't They?"	Gareth Mortimer	4:50
6.	"Slide on By"	Perkins; Joel Silbersher	8:12
7.	"The View South"	Paterson	3:22
8.	"Un Sound"	Perkins	4:35
9.	"Last Words"	Perkins	5:11

== Charts ==
Chart (2015)	Position
Australian Albums (ARIA)	52

== Release history ==
Region	Date	Format	Edition(s)	Label	Catalogue
Australia	July 2015	CD; Digital download	Standard	Tex Perkins and the Dark Horses, Inertia	DHR003
