= Iron On (band) =

Australian indie rock band

- Origin: Brisbane, Queensland, Australia
- Genres: Indie rock, pop rock
- Years active: 2002–2009
- Members: Kate Cooper; Ross Hope; Ian Rogers; Marieca Page
- Website: myspace.com/ironon

Iron On was an Australian indie rock band from Brisbane, Queensland.

== History ==
The band formed in 2002 after members Kate Cooper and Ross Hope met at university. Not long after, Ian Rogers joined, and Iron on was forged – named after a Superchunk song. After three years original drummer Nicola Phoenix was replaced by Marieca Page.

Iron on releases to date consist of debut EP "The Understudy" (2003), EP "Everybody Calm Down" (2004), debut album "Oh The Romance" (2005) and EP "The Verse" (2007). They were nominated for "favourite new international artist/group" in 2006 by Canadian Music Week.

According to the band's Myspace profile, Iron on has disbanded. Kate Cooper now plays in the band An Horse along with Damon Cox, drummer for bands Intercooler and Mary Trembles. Ian Rogers plays bass guitar in duo No Anchor. Ross Hope has started a new pop/rock band called Disco Nap.

=== Recording ===
==== Oh The Romance ====
Iron on recorded their debut album in a renovated Church turned Studio out in Applewood, Ipswich with ARIA award-winning producer Magoo (Regurgitator, Midnight Oil, Jebediah, Kate Miller-Heidke).

The band members remarked on the setting of the recording studio as being 'alarmingly similar to the Great Northern Hotel in Twin Peaks'

== Success ==
Since forming in July 2002, Iron on have also toured around Australia and played as far afield as Canada, alongside such illustrious artists as Sleater Kinney (US), Ben Kweller (US), Kaki King (US), Magic Dirt (AUS), Screamfeeder (AUS), The Superjesus (AUS), The Gossip (US), Tegan and Sara (CAN), Shout Out Louds (SWE) and The Shins (US).

In 2003 Iron on played the Brisbane leg of the Livid Festival and in January 2005 played the Big Day Out. November 2005 they were selected by Triple J for the Next Crop promotion in celebration of Oz Music Month.

In December 2005 Rave Magazine named them "Rave Critics Choice 2005" for debut album Oh the Romance. In February 2006 the band hit the road with Canadian songwriting wonder-twins Tegan and Sara. Shortly after, the band showcased at Canadian Music Week (CMW) in Toronto, where they were shortlisted for the "2006 Indies" in the "Favourite New Artist/International Group" category. and managed to create a stir with Canadian fans and critics alike.

Their release of "Oh The Romance" was met with acclaim across Brisbane and Australia, with a number of local street press and local community radio stations making it their album of the week.

== Discography ==
=== EPs ===
The Understudy (2003)

1. Ruddy
2. Best Or Less
3. Old Cat
4. Everything Takes Too Long
5. Sleep In

Everybody Calm Down (2004)

1. Fifty-Four Equals Two Hundred
2. Watch Me Stumble
3. Butter on the Brakes
4. Repetition, Repetition
5. Arrange Me
6. I Had To Read It More Than Once

The Verse (2007)

1. One Man Band
2. Showing Signs
3. Snow (Applewood Session)
4. Can't Concentrate (Applewood Session)
5. Terrible Year

=== Albums ===
Oh The Romance (2005)

1. Learn Today Earn Tomorrow
2. Reckless Pronto
3. Playing Hard To Want
4. Sidewalk
5. Hearts
6. There's A Shirt of Yours at My House
7. The Safety
8. High Miami High
9. Keeping Up Appearances
10. More Than Tape
