= Far Be It from Me =

Studio album by Tex Perkins
- Released: August 1996
- Recorded: February–May 1996
- Studio: Megaphon Studios, Sydney and Seed Studios, Melbourne

Tex Perkins chronology
Far Be It from Me (1996)	Dark Horses (2000)

Far Be It from Me is the debut solo studio album by Australian singer-songwriter Tex Perkins. The album was released in August 1996 and peaked at number 42 on the ARIA Charts.

== Track listing ==
No.	Title	Writer(s)	Length
1.	"She's a Friend of Mine"	Charlie Owen; Tex Perkins	4:39
2.	"Splendid Lie"	Perkins	3:47
3.	"This Is Forever"	Kristyna Higgins; Perkins	4:41
4.	"Her Own Life"	Perkins	3:21
5.	"I Can't Sing"	Perkins	4:12
6.	"That Was Now This Is Then"	Perkins	2:28
7.	"Two Wrongs"	Nick Cave; Perkins	6:33
8.	"Real Love"	Perkins	3:45
9.	"You're Too Beautiful"	Perkins	4:45
10.	"Somewhere in the World"	Dave Graney	4:28
11.	"It Will Come"	Perkins	6:28
12.	"Whatever and Ever"	Warren Ellis; Higgins; Owen; Perkins; Jim White	1:57

== Charts ==
Chart (1996)	Peak position
Australian Albums (ARIA)	43

== Release history ==
Region	Date	Format	Edition(s)	Label	Catalogue
Australia	August 1996	CD	Standard	Slick, Polydor Records	533062-2
