= Guy Webster =

Guy Webster may refer to

- Guy Webster (photographer)
- Guy Webster (musician)
