= Death's Dateless Night =

Studio album by Paul Kelly and Charlie Owen
- Released: 7 October 2016
- Recorded: 2016
- Studio: Scion, Arthurs Seat, Victoria; Jackson Street, St. Kilda
- Genre: Pop rock
- Length: 40:28
- Label: Gawd Aggie; Universal
- Producer: J. Walker; Paul Kelly; Charlie Owen

Paul Kelly albums chronology
Seven Sonnets and a Song (2016)	Death's Dateless Night (2016)	Life Is Fine (2017)

Death's Dateless Night is the 22nd studio album by Paul Kelly and is a collaboration with fellow Australian musician, Charlie Owen, which was issued via Gawd Aggie/Universal Music Australia on 7 October 2016. It was co-produced by Kelly, Owen and J. Walker, which peaked at No. 16 on the ARIA Albums Chart. It was nominated for Best Blues and Roots Album at the ARIA Music Awards of 2017.

== Background ==
Australian musicians Paul Kelly and Charlie Owen released Death's Dateless Night as a collaborative concept album, with "songs that they have performed at funerals." In 2015 Kelly and Owen were driving to the funeral of a friend when they discussed tracks they had used on such occasions and decided to record an album of such songs. The title is a phrase from Shakespeare's Sonnet 30.

Most of the tracks on Death's Dateless Night are cover versions, some are traditional songs and a few are originals previously recorded by Kelly. Kelly provided lead vocals and guitars (acoustic, electric), while Owen was on dobro, guitars (acoustic, nylon string, lap steel), piano (standard, electric) and vocal harmonies. Kelly's relatives Maddy and Memphis (his daughters) and Mary Jo (his sister), as well as fellow record producer, Machine Translations (a.k.a. J. Walker or Greg Walker), performed vocal harmonies on the record. Walker also mixed and engineered the album. At the ARIA Music Awards of 2017 it was nominated for Best Blues and Roots Album.

== Reception ==
Professional ratings
Review scores
Source	Rating
Cashbox Magazine	4/5 stars
The Guardian	mixed
No Depression	positive
PopMatters	7/10 stars
Record Collector	4/5 stars

Cashbox Magazine's David Bowling rated the album at four-out-of-five stars and explained, "The music is basic and for the most part acoustic... The song-selection is more philosophical than depressing... [they] have managed to make the concept of death both interesting and listenable." Jasper Bruce of PopMatters rated it at seven-out-of-ten and opined, "The wandering style and stripped-back texture are vintage Kelly, and the slide guitar classic Owen. The record is a strong continuation of the musical explorations of these great Australian artists who, while they can always keep us guessing, are forever able to validate why they are held in such high esteem."

The Guardian' Andrew Stafford appreciated two tracks, "One is 'Good Things', by the late Maurice Frawley, who played in Kelly's band the Dots. Owen's moaning steel guitar perfectly complements Kelly's plaintive, haunted vocal and two-chord acoustic shuffle. Singing one of the finest songs of his lost friend, here Kelly is hanging on for dear life. The other triumph is 'Pretty Bird Tree', by the Indigenous singer/songwriter LJ (Lawrence) Hill. It's as powerful as anything by Archie Roach or Kev Carmody and... Kelly's voice is at its most yearning as he retells Hill's heart-stopping narrative." Although Stafford observed, "perhaps the other songs simply suffer for their overfamiliarity. Either way, it’s hard not to wish for more from someone who, at his best, has written so fearlessly about life, death and everything in between."

== Track listing ==
All tracks are written by Paul Kelly, unless otherwise shown

No.	Title	Writer(s)	Length
1.	"Hard Times"	Stephen Foster	4:02
2.	"To Live Is to Fly"	Townes Van Zandt	3:50
3.	"Pretty Bird Tree"	Lawrence John Hill	3:37
4.	"Pallet on Your Floor"	Traditional, arranged by Kelly	4:04
5.	"Nukkunya"		3:30
6.	"Parting Glass"	Traditional, arranged by Kelly and Owen	2:24
7.	"Meet Me in the Middle of the Air"		2:58
8.	"Don't Fence Me In"	Cole Porter	3:05
9.	"Bird on a Wire"	Leonard Cohen	3:15
10.	"Good Things"	Maurice Frawley	3:30
11.	"Let It Be"	Lennon–McCartney	2:39
12.	"Angel of Death"	Hank Williams	3:34

== Personnel ==
Musicians

- Maddy Kelly – vocal harmony
- Mary Jo Kelly – vocal harmony
- Paul Kelly – guitars (acoustic, electric), lead vocals
- Memphis Kelly – vocal harmony
- Charlie Owen – dobro, guitars (acoustic, nylon string, lap steel), piano, piano (electric), synthesiser, vocal harmony
- Greg Walker (a.k.a. Machine Translations) – vocal harmony

Recording details

- Adam Dempsey – mastering
- Paul Kelly – producer
- Charlie Owen – producer
- Jay Walker (a.k.a. Machine Translations) – engineer, mixing, producer

Art works

- Siân Darling – photography
- Andrew Doherty – photography
- Kylie Greer – photography
- Steve Young – back cover photo, cover photo

Credits:

== Charts ==
Chart (2015)	Peak position
Australian Albums (ARIA)	16
