= Old School Is the New School =

Studio album by Intercooler
- Released: 2 September 2002
- Recorded: 2002
- Studios: Rockinghorse; Arctic; Red Zeds; Black Box
- Genre: Rock
- Label: Rhythm Ace/MGM
- Producer: Jeff Lovejoy

Intercooler chronology
Old School Is the New School (2002)	Forever or Whatever (2007)

Old School Is the New School is the first album by Australian rock band, Intercooler. It was originally released in September 2002 via Rhythm Ace Records and distributed by MGM. The line-up of Phil Ballantyne on lead vocals and guitar, Michael Caso on guitar, Damon Cox on drums and vocals, and Joel Potter on bass guitar and vocals, had formed in the previous year. The album was recorded and mixed by Jeff Lovejoy at Rockinghorse, Arctic, Red Zeds and Black Box studios and mastered at Studios 301 by Steve Smart.

Old School Is the New School was re-released with three new tracks, "Tea Ball", "Country" and "It's Like a Girl", on 5 June 2006 by Silent Echo/MGM with the track, "Lovejoy" removed. The extra tracks also appear on Goodness of the Girl, a five-track extended play (September 2002).

== Reception ==
According to Oz Music Project's correspondent, Old School Is the New School's tracks, "received Triple J airplay and the band found themselves playing venues on the East Coast regularly. During this time the band gathered support slots for bands such as Teenage Fanclub, The Buzzcocks and J.Mascis." A reviewer from Drum Media opined, "[its title is] a good commentary on current trends in the music industry and the style of Intercooler's music... [which is] fresh and devoid of rock cliches. This is an album which gives the listener the impression that Intercooler are having fun doing their thing and recording their music. This feeling easily transfers itself to the listener and makes [it] rewarding and enjoyable..."

== Track listing ==
Original release

All tracks are written by Joel Potter, Michael Caso, Damon Cox, Phil Ballantyne; unless otherwise indicated

Original release (MGM RA108)
No.	Title	Length
1.	"Goodness of the Girl"	3:44
2.	"For Said"	5:05
3.	"Emo"	3:52
4.	"Good Friend"	3:13
5.	"Lovejoy" (Potter, M Caso, I Caso, Ballantyne)	5:08
6.	"Crimson Cracker" (Potter, M Caso, I Caso, Ballantyne)	2:08
7.	"Leaflet"	3:02
8.	"Delicious" (Potter, M Caso, I Caso, Ballantyne)	3:50
9.	"Timothy Tucker Part II" (Potter, M Caso, I Caso, Ballantyne)	4:02
10.	"Daniel and the Machine"	3:45
11.	"If You'd Seen"	4:43

All tracks are written by Joel Potter, Michael Caso, Damon Cox, Phil Ballantyne; unless otherwise indicated

2006 Re-release (MGM SE30303)
No.	Title	Length
1.	"Goodness of the Girl"	3:44
2.	"Tea Ball"	2:52
3.	"Emo"	3:52
4.	"For Said"	5:05
5.	"Good Friend"	3:13
6.	"It's Like a Girl"	2:43
7.	"Crimson Cracker" (Potter, M Caso, I Caso, Ballantyne)	2:08
8.	"Country"	2:55
9.	"Leaflet"	3:02
10.	"Delicious" (Potter, M Caso, I Caso, Ballantyne)	3:50
11.	"Timothy Tucker Part II" (Potter, M Caso, I Caso, Ballantyne)	4:02
12.	"Daniel and the Machine"	3:45
13.	"If You'd Seen"	4:43

== Personnel ==
Intercooler members

- Phil Ballantyne – lead vocals, guitar
- Michael Caso – guitar
- Damon Cox – drums, vocals
- Joel Potter – bass guitar, vocals

Recording details

- Producer – Jeff Lovejoy at Rockinghorse, Arctic, Red Zeds and Black Box studios
- Mastering – Steve Smart at Studios 301
