= Forever or Whatever =

Studio album by Intercooler
- Released: 24 February 2007
- Genre: Rock
- Label: Plus One Records/Shock Records
- Producer: Magoo/Intercooler

Intercooler chronology
Old School Is the New School (2002)	Forever or Whatever (2007)	Time To Let Go (2011)

Forever or Whatever is the second album by Intercooler. It was released on 24 February 2007. The album was produced by Magoo and Intercooler, recorded and mixed at Black Box Recording, and mastered by William Bowden at King Willy Sound.

== Track listing ==
1. "Sail This into Me"
2. "Destiny"
3. "Carving Others"
4. "All Coming Back to Me"
5. "Wasted My Day"
6. "Situations"
7. "Futures Created"
8. "Come Back Down"
9. "Navigate This"
10. "Move from My Way"
11. "Pop Clothes"
12. "Hold Me Again"
13. "My Problem"
14. "Ok Girl"
