= Cutter and Bone =

1976 novel by Newton Thornburg

- First edition
- Author: Newton Thornburg
- Language: English
- Genre: Mystery; Thriller; Suspense; Crime Fiction
- Set in: United States
- Published: 1976
- Publisher: Little, Brown
- Publication place: United States
- Media type: Print (hard cover)
- Pages: 346; 412 (paperback)

Cutter and Bone is a 1976 thriller novel by Newton Thornburg.

Set in Los Angeles and Santa Barbara, California, a crippled Vietnam veteran, Alexander Cutter, tries to convince his beach bum friend, Richard Bone, who has abandoned his wife and kids in Chicago and lives with Cutter and his girlfriend Mo, that Bone witnessed a murder of a local high school cheerleader. With the help of the cheerleader's sister, together they plan to blackmail a wealthy and successful businessman who Bone believes, but is not certain, is the murderer.

The book was adapted to film by director Ivan Passer as Cutter's Way in 1981. It stars John Heard as Cutter, Jeff Bridges as Bone and Lisa Eichhorn as Mo (Maureen).

== Release details ==
- Thornburg, Newton. Cutter and Bone. Serpent's Tail (reprint), 2001. ISBN 1-85242-676-4
