= Tylea =

Australian singer and songwriter

Tylea Goold
- Also known as: Tylea
- Born: Tylea Croucher; Bundaberg, Queensland, Australia
- Instruments: Vocals, guitar, piano

Tylea is an Australian singer and songwriter. She started out as a solo performer, releasing the EPs Bellowing Flower (1994) and Tylea with a T in 1997, and went on to become the singer and guitarist for Gota Cola. After Gota Cola took a break, she released a self-titled EP in 2003 with Tylea and the Imaginary Music Score, a band featuring Magoo and Marcel Lip. Her 2005 debut solo album Colour Your Insecurities was a double album with two CDs of Light and Dark songs.

Tylea has a daughter, Chorus, with husband Lachlan "Magoo" Goold.

== Discography ==
- Bellowing Flower EP (1994)
- Tylea with a T EP (1997)
- Tylea and the Imaginary Music Score EP (2003)
- Colour Your Insecurities (2005)
