= Jolyon Hoff =

Australian documentary filmmaker

Jolyon Hoff is an Australian documentary filmmaker, known for his films focusing on refugees and Australian surfing history. He is known for the 2023 surfing documentary You Should Have Been Here Yesterday, and the 2022 documentary about Afghan Australians, Watandar, My Countryman, which he made with Hazara photographer Muzafar Ali. He again collaborated with Ali on his most recent film is We Are Not Powerless (2025). He is founder-director of the production company Light Sound Art Film, based in Adelaide, South Australia.

== Early life and education ==
Jolyon Hoff was raised by a single mother, and he would spend his holidays with his grandparents, who lived first in Sydney and then to a place near Byron Bay when Hoff was around four. Hoff's uncle was a surfer who lived in Lennox Head in the 1970s, who taught Hoff to surf.

He graduated from the Australian Film, Television and Radio School (AFTRS) with a Master of Arts degree in Film, Television and Digital Media, Documentary, in 2007. He was taught there by Robert Connolly, among others.

== Career ==
From around 2005 to 2020 Hoff years lived and worked in Nigeria, Indonesia, Nepal, and Washington, D.C., United States.

His 2005 feature-length documentary Morrowind Babies is about the computer game publisher Bethesda Softworks in the United States. Also in the US, he made music videos for Thievery Corporation and Chuck Brown, as well as TV commercials for PBS.

Hoff established and managed a media production studio in the Niger Delta region of Nigeria, where he mentored and trained young Nigerian filmmakers. He also created the web series Nigeria Stories and filmed several development films.

He made the 2009 documentary, Searching For Michael Peterson, when still a student. The film is about elusive Australian surfer Michael Peterson.

His documentary Aceh – Ten Years After the Tsunami, about the aftermath of the 2004 Boxing Day tsunami that killed 160,000 people in Aceh province in Indonesia, is on permanent display at the Aceh Tsunami Museum.

His 2017 film, which he directed and produced, The Staging Post is about refugees in Indonesia. It was screened at the Screenwave International Film Festival (SWIFF) in the Coffs Harbour region of northern New South Wales, a festival curated by Dave Horsley and Kate Howat.

During the COVID-19 pandemic (2020–2021), Hoff set to work creating The Surf Film Archive, a catalogue of lost footage and deteriorating celluloid film from around Australia and elsewhere. He converted film by filmmakers such as Paul Witzig, Dick Hoole, Bob Evans to digital form. Hoff's 70-minute film That Was Then, This Is Now, comprising a selection of clips from the Surf Film Archive, had its world premiere at the 2022 SWIFF in April 2022. The footage had been sourced from private collections as well as the National Film and Sound Archive, and includes footage from surf filmmaker Paul Witzig. Elements Post Production at Byron Bay did the post-production on the film. The debut screening was accompanied by a live performance by the group Headland, led by Murray Paterson, who are known for their musical scores for surf films.

Hoff directed, co-wrote, and co-produced the feature documentary Watandar, My Countryman along with Hazara photographer Muzafar Ali, who arrived in Australia as a refugee in 2015. The film, which explores the concept of identity, arose after Ali started investigating the long history of Afghan people in Australia. The film features Nici Cumpston, artistic director of Tarnanthi, and curator of Aboriginal and Torres Strait Islander art at the Art Gallery of South Australia. It premiered at the Adelaide Film Festival in October 2022, and was also screened at the 2023 SWIFF, where Ali and Hoff attended for post-screening Q&As.

At the Noosa Festival of Surfing in February 2023, a two-hour compilation film from the Surf Film Archive was accompanied by the live band Headland. His 2023 documentary You Should Have Been Here Yesterday is a tribute to early Australian surf culture, featuring filmmaker Albe Falzon, surfboard designers Wayne Lynch, Bob McTavish, and Maurice Cole, (Note: Wayne Lynch (born 1951) and Maurice Cole were surfers and surfboard designers.) and champion surfer Pauline Menczer. Hoff cut down around 150 hours of footage to 80 minutes of film, and produced the film. The film screened at every major film festival in Australia, including in competition at the 71st Sydney Film Festival. It screened at the Sydney Opera House, and at over 50 cinemas to packed audiences and good reviews. It was released in Australian cinemas on 21 November 2024.

We Are Not Powerless, which Hoff co-wrote and co-directed with Muzafar Ali, has its world premiere at the 2025 Adelaide Film Festival on 22 October 2025. The film was produced by Hoff, Ali, and Hamish Gibbs Ludbrook through Light Sound Art Film, with cinematography by Bonnie Elliott, Maxx Corkindale, Khadim Dai, and Andrew Commis. The film is about the school for refugees in Indonesia founded by Ali and his wife Nagina, which started with a $200 donation and now educates around 1300 students.

== Light Sound Art Film ==
Hoff is founder-director of the production company Light Sound Art Film Pty Ltd (LSAF), based at The Mill in Angas Street, Adelaide.

== Other activities ==
Hoff established the Australia Nepali Film Exchange in Nepal. He has been a jury member and presenter at the Kathmandu International Mountain Film Festival.

On 25 May 2024 he was part of a panel presentation at UNSW Art & Design lecture theatre called "Sounds of the Desert: Stories of the Cameleers", along with curator Nici Cumpston, artists Elyas Alavi and Raymond Zada, and others.

== Recognition and awards ==
- 2017: Highly Commended, for Best Stand-Alone Documentary by the Australian Directors Guild for The Staging Post
- 2022: Nominated Screen Producers Australia Awards, for Watandar, My Countryman

== Selected films ==
- Morrowind Babies (2005)
- Searching For Michael Peterson (2009)
- Aceh – Ten Years After the Tsunami (2014)
- The Staging Post (2017)
- Watandar, My Countryman (2022)
- You Should've Been Here Yesterday (2023)
- We Are Not Powerless (2025)
