= Newton Thornburg =

American writer

- Born: May 13, 1929; Harvey, Illinois
- Died: May 9, 2011 (aged 81); Bothell, Washington
- Occupation: Author
- Years active: 1968-1998
- Notable work: Cutter and Bone

Newton Kendall Thornburg Jr. (13 May 1929 – 9 May 2011) was an American novelist. He is most known for his 1976 novel Cutter and Bone, which was adapted into the 1981 film Cutter's Way.

== Early life ==
Thornburg was born in Harvey, Illinois to Newton Kendall Thornburg and Rhea Martha Mattox Thornburg. He was one of four children; he had an older brother, Robert, and two younger sisters, Margaret and Mary. His family was devoutly religious, but Thornburg soon became disenchanted with religion.

Thornburg enrolled at Illinois Wesleyan College in Bloomington, Illinois, where he had a five-page short story published in the Methodist Student Movement's magazine. Thornburg was more interested in painting and transferred to the University of Iowa to study art. Thornburg graduated from the University of Iowa with a Fine Arts degree. Thornburg briefly enrolled in the Iowa Graduate Writers Workshop before dropping out. He worked in a variety of jobs before devoting himself to writing full-time (or at least in tandem with his cattle farm in the Ozarks) in 1973.

== Career ==
Thornburg published his first novel Gentleman Born in 1967. Due to poor sales, Thornburg wrote his subsequent novel Knockover with the intent of writing a more traditional crime novel. A studio brought the rights to the book for a small fee, but no film was made of it.

Thornburg's first big success was To Die in California. It was his first hardcover novel, and rights to the film were sold to film producer Hal Wallis for $100,000. Thornburg worked with Wallis on the screenplay, but a feature film was not made. The sale did, however, allow Thornburg to buy his own ranch near Jane, Missouri and work on writing full-time.

His 1976 novel Cutter and Bone received rave reviews, with The New York Times calling it "the best novel of its kind for ten years." It was filmed in 1981 as Cutter's Way, directed by Ivan Passer. Thornburg landed a four-book contract with Little, Brown and published Black Angus, Valhalla, and Dreamland. Another novel of Thornburg's, Beautiful Kate, was filmed in Australia in 2009 and starred Bryan Brown and Ben Mendelsohn, and directed by Brown's wife Rachel Ward.

== Personal life ==
Thornburg married Karin Larson in 1952. They had three children; Kristen "Kris" (b. 1957), Mark (1959–2000), and Doug (b. 1961). Karin died unexpectedly in 1986. Thornburg married Janet Adams in 1992 but the two divorced three years later. Thornburg died on May 9, 2011, a few days shy of his 82nd birthday.

== Bibliography ==
- Gentleman Born, Fawcett, 1967
- Knockover, 1968
- To Die in California, 1973; Consortium Book Sales & Dist, 2002, ISBN 9781852428068
- Cutter and Bone: a novel, Popular Library, 1976, ISBN 9780445040298; Serpent's Tail, 2001, ISBN 9781852426767
- Black Angus 1979; Fawcett Popular Library, 1980, ISBN 9780445045248
- Valhalla, Little, Brown, 1980, ISBN 9780316843935
- Dreamland, Arbor House, 1983, ISBN 9780877954446; Consortium Book Sales & Dist, 2004, ISBN 9781852428334
- Beautiful Kate, Berkley Publishing Group, 1984, ISBN 9780425064191
- The Lion at the Door, 1990; Piatkus Books, 1992, ISBN 9780749901004
- A Man's Game Forge/Tor, 1996, ISBN 9780312859237
- Eve's Men, 1998; Tor Books (Mm), 1999, ISBN 9780812584196
