= Monday Morning Coming Down... =

Live album by Tex, Don and Charlie
- Released: February 1995
- Venue: The Gershwin Room, Esplanade Hotel, St. Kilda, Melbourne, Australia
- Length: 71:50
- Label: Red Eye Records, Polydor
- Producer: Tex, Don and Charlie

Tex, Don and Charlie chronology
Sad But True (1993)	Monday Morning Coming Down... (1995)	All Is Forgiven (2005)

Monday Morning Coming Down... is the first and only live album by Australian rock band Tex, Don and Charlie. It was released in February 1995 on the last day of their tour and peaked at number 96 on the Australian charts.

In Tex Perkins' 2017 autobiography Tex he says "Originally recorded live as a bonus disc for a second run of promotion for Sad But True, we realised that would mean a whole lot of people who bought Sad But True when it first came out would have to buy the album again to get Monday Morning Coming Down... so we insisted it be released as an album unto itself. So basically it's a collision of record company logic and artist morality. It probably shouldn't exist at all, being comprised of most of the previous album and a few wobbly covers."

Owen said, "It was a really special tour and the live album showed that to us. Every song of the gig was fantastic and we put every song on the album."

== Track listing ==
No.	Title	Writer(s)	Length
1.	"Fateful Day"	Walker
2.	"The Girl with the Bluebird"	Walker
3.	"Postcard From Elvis"	Michael Dan Ehmig, Michael Smotherman
4.	"Fake That Emotion"	Glenn Dormand, Perkins
5.	"Redheads, Gold Cards & Long Black Limousines"	Walker, Smotherman
6.	"Louise"	Walker
7.	"I Won't Do To You What I Done to Her"	Owen, Perkins
8.	"Dead Dog Boogie"	Owen
9.	"Sitting in a Bar"	Walker
10.	"Danielle"	Walker
11.	"Play with Fire"	Nanker Phelge
12.	"Still the Same"	Perkins
13.	"I Must Be Getting Soft"	Perkins
14.	"Bird on a Wire"	Leonard Cohen
15.	"Sing Me Back Home"	Merle Haggard
16.	"Sunday Morning Coming Down"	Kris Kristofferson

== Personnel ==
- Tex Perkins – vocals, guitar
- Don Walker – vocals, piano, keyboards
- Charlie Owen – guitar, dobro
- Shane Walsh – double bass
- Jim White – drums
- Kim Salmon – jew's harp
- Garrett Costigan – pedal steel guitar

== Charts ==
Chart performance for Monday Morning Coming Down...
Chart (1995)	Peak position
Australian Albums (ARIA)	96

== Release history ==
Release history and formats for Monday Morning Coming Down...
Region	Date	Format	Label	Catalogue
Australia	February 1995	2×CD	Red Eye Records, Polydor	REDCD43, 527089-2
