= Dance of a Thousand Promises =

Dance Of A Thousand Promises

EP by Intercooler
- Released: October 2004
- Genre: Rock
- Label: Plus One/Shock
- Producer: Magoo/Intercooler/Paul Annison

Dance Of A Thousand Promises is an EP by Australian band Intercooler. It was originally released in October 2004.

== Track listing ==
1. "Lovin' And Leavin'"
2. "If I Try"
3. "Cream Puff"
4. "Sugarplum"
5. "You're Not Gonna Hurt Us Again"

== Notes ==
- All songs written by Phil Ballantyne and Intercooler.
- Tracks 1, 3, 4, and 5 produced by Magoo and Intercooler.
- Track 2 produced by Paul "Woody" Annison.
