= Trouble (magazine) =

Australian magazine

- Cover of the first issue of Trouble, April 2004
- Editor: Steve Proposch
- Categories: arts and culture
- Frequency: monthly
- Circulation: 20,000+
- Publisher: Trouble Magazine
- Founder: Steve and Melissa Proposch
- Founded: 2004
- First issue: 1 April 2004
- Company: Trouble Magazine
- Country: Australia
- Based in: Melbourne
- Language: English
- Website: troublemag.com
- ISSN: 1449-3926

Trouble is a free independent monthly magazine for the promotion of visual and performing arts and culture. Trouble Magazine, a company that is co-directed by artists Steve and Melissa Proposch, publishes and distributes the title in the AppStore and online at troublemag.com.

== History and profile ==
Trouble was started in Newstead, Australia, in 2004. The first issue featured a cover image of The Young Family (2002-3) by Patricia Piccinini, which had been recently acquired by the Bendigo Art Gallery. The first magazine consisted of 16 black and white pages, and the 1,000 copies that were printed soon disappeared from around 50 chosen outlets around Bendigo and Castlemaine in central Victoria. In 2011 a CAB audit of the magazine's circulation confirmed a figure of 20,000 free copies of Trouble being distributed nationally in Australia each month. Trouble magazine is edited and designed by Steve Proposch, and continues to publish contemporary material of particular interest to artists, performers and arts consumers.

In August 2013 Trouble developed an IOS app.
