= Guy Webster (musician) =

- Member of: Broken Head

Guy Webster is a Brisbane singer/songwriter. He is a member of Broken Head, The Informants and Guy Webster and Friends and released his solo self-titled debut EP in 2002. To promote the EP he went on a national tour with George. In 2003, Webster worked with poet Doug Thomson to release an EP, Seahorse.

== Discography ==
- Guy Webster (2002)
