= All Is Forgiven (album) =

Studio album by Tex, Don and Charlie
- Released: 26 September 2005
- Studio: Electric Avenue Studios
- Length: 54:21
- Label: Universal Music Australia
- Producers: Tex, Don and Charlie

Tex, Don and Charlie chronology
Monday Morning Coming Down... (1995)	All Is Forgiven (2005)	You Don't Know Lonely (2017)

All Is Forgiven is the second studio album by Australian rock band Tex, Don and Charlie. It was released in September 2005 and peaked at number 58 on the Australian albums chart.

In 2005, The album was shortlisted for the Australian Music Prize.

== Details ==
The song "You're 39, You're Beautiful & You're Mine" was written by Paul Kelly. Perkins said, "I was on a mission to get good songs, no matter where they came from. I basically just spoke to every great songwriter I came across and got down on my knees and said, 'Pleeeeease! I've got nothing! I've got nothing!' So he threw me a bone."

Walker later said of his song "Harry was a Bad Bugger", "The subject matter is a combination of three blokes that I knew when I was young in Grafton. These were older guys who were part of the bodgie generation who had washed up in regional Australia. Guys who were five or ten years older than me and are cunning as all fuck, never short of money but never have any visible means of support, utterly ruthless with anybody around them, and devastatingly attractive because of that."

== Promotional video ==
The album was promoted with a short film, written and directed by Karen Borger, which included a special edit to be used as the music video for the group's single, Whenever it Snows. Band member Owen said "The record company came up with the idea, instead of making just a video, they thought we could make this so they can show it in other places rather than the rock video format." The short film won Best Film, Wollombi Film Festival (NSW Australia), screened at St Kilda Film Festival (Victoria, Australia) and was selected for 'Best of the Fest' traveling film festival (across Australia). It screened at Woodford Folk Festival, Queensland on New Year's Eve and at the Australian Film Weekend in Toronto, Ontario Canada w. feature film 'The Proposition'. The film has been screened repeatedly on RAGE - ABC TV, Australia.

== Reception ==
Radio National's Daily Planet said, "The songs on Tex, Don and Charlie's new CD, All is Forgiven have been neglected for years, but that makes them all the more memorable. When Tex Perkins, Don Walker and Charlie Owen first recorded together in 1993, they had hardly played together. The obstacles that got in the way of making this new CD have benefited it - with extra time, the songs became finely honed and alive with unique characters."

"Harry was a Bad Bugger" was described by Chris Johnston as, " a Slim Dusty meets Wolf Creek kind of tune - the Australian song of the year", by Mess & Noise as, "one of the finest Australian compositions of the last 20 years", and The West Australian as a "lyrical masterpiece".

Craig Mathieson in The Sun-Herald called it, "a second dose of ruminative country blues, spinning idiosyncratic Australian tales of drifters and the unhinged. "All Is Forgiven" is assured but never takes the truth for granted." The Daily Telegraph agreed it was, "a stunning collection of tunes about down and out characters set to minimalist piano and guitar with brushstrokes of violin, pedal steel and drums."

== Track listing ==
No.	Title	Writer(s)	Length
1.	"Paycheques"	Charlie Owen, Don Walker, Murray Paterson, Tex Perkins
2.	"A Place to Hide"	Perkins
3.	"Whenever It Snows"	Paterson, Perkins
4.	"Jails"	Walker
5.	"You're 39, You're Beautiful & You're Mine"	Paul Kelly
6.	"Words Fail Me"	Perkins, Walker
7.	"Another Night In"	Walker
8.	"Lost in Space"	Perkins
9.	"The Singer of the Song"	Walker, Perkins
10.	"Harry Was a Bad Bugger"	Walker
11.	"The Price You Had to Pay"	Walker
12.	"The Healing Power of Helpless Laughter"	Walker, Jim Moginie
13.	"Someday I'll Forget"	Paterson, Perkins

== Personnel ==
- Tex Perkins – vocals, guitar
- Don Walker – vocals, piano, keyboards
- Charlie Owen – guitar, dobro
- Shane Walsh – double bass
- Jim White – drums
- Garrett Costigan – pedal steel guitar

== Charts ==
Chart performance for All Is Forgiven
Chart (2005)	Peak position
Australian Albums (ARIA)	58

== Release history ==
Release history and formats for All Is Forgiven
Region	Date	Format	Label	Catalogue
Australia	26 September 2005	2×CD	Universal Music Australia	9873330
Australia	2 March 2018	Vinyl (reissue)	Universal Music Australia	6733579
