= Skritch =

Australian musician

- Birth name: Richard Needham

Skritch is an Australian musician. He sings, plays drums, guitar, bass and keyboards and has been a member of The Long Johns, Gota Cola, Broken Head, Mary Trembles, Tex Perkins' Dark Horses, SKAM Artist and Ranger.
