= Cutter's Way =

1981 film by Ivan Passer

- Theatrical poster
- Directed by: Ivan Passer
- Screenplay by: Jeffrey Alan Fiskin
- Based on: Cutter and Bone (1976 novel) by Newton Thornburg
- Produced by: Paul R. Gurian
- Starring: Jeff Bridges; John Heard; Lisa Eichhorn
- Cinematography: Jordan Cronenweth
- Edited by: Caroline Biggerstaff
- Music by: Jack Nitzsche
- Production company: Gurian Entertainment
- Distributed by: United Artists
- Release date: March 20, 1981
- Running time: 109 minutes
- Country: United States
- Language: English
- Budget: $3 million or $5 million
- Box office: $1,729,274

Cutter's Way (originally titled Cutter and Bone) is a 1981 American neo-noir thriller film directed by Ivan Passer, and starring Jeff Bridges, John Heard, and Lisa Eichhorn. It is adapted by Jeffrey Alan Fiskin from the 1976 novel Cutter and Bone by Newton Thornburg. The musical score was written by Jack Nitzsche. In the film, Vietnam veteran Alex Cutter and his friend Richard Bone are embroiled in a murder investigation, after Cutter suspects that Bone was a witness.

The film was released by United Artists on March 20, 1981. Despite widespread positive reviews, the film was a commercial failure, with Passer blaming the studio for failing to adequately promote it. In the years since, Cutter's Way has developed a cult following.

== Plot ==
One rainy night in Santa Barbara, California, after leaving the El Encanto Hotel, Richard Bone's car breaks down on a side road during a rainstorm. He sees a large car draw up a little way behind him. A man throws something into a garbage can. At first, Bone thinks nothing of it and proceeds to meet his best friend, disabled Vietnam veteran Alex Cutter, at a bar. The following day, a young woman is found murdered in a garbage can, and Bone becomes a suspect.

At Santa Barbara's “Old Spanish Days” parade, Bone sees local tycoon J.J. Cord, whom he recognizes as the man he saw at the garbage can. Cutter begins to take an interest in the case. His interest soon becomes a conspiracy theory that develops into an investigation with a skeptical Bone and Valerie, the dead girl's sister, along for the ride. The three of them recklessly share their conversation at a restaurant where Mrs. Cord overhears them accusing her husband of murder.

Bone romances Mo, Cutter's wife, who is suffering with alcoholism and depression. After Cutter attempts to blackmail Cord as a way of making Cord incriminate himself, Cutter's house mysteriously burns down with Mo inside.

After the fire destroys Cutter's house, he becomes convinced that Cord had been trying to kill Bone, but Bone worries that Mo killed herself. There are also shots throughout the film of a gas heater that might have been the cause of an accidental fire.

George, who considers Cord a friend and mentor, warns Bone that Cutter is putting himself in danger and should leave Cord alone. Now homeless, Cutter stays in George's guesthouse, where he researches Cord. He concludes that Cord was responsible for the death of George's father years earlier in order to gain control of the marina, and that Cord later paid for George's education and helped establish his business to maintain influence over him. He thinks that Cord has also murdered Vickie Duran and Mo.

Cutter takes an invitation George received to a party at Cord's house and gets Bone to drive him there. When Cutter tells Bone that he plans to kill Cord, Bone follows him. After being spotted by Mrs. Cord and apprehended by security guards, Bone winds up in Cord's office. Cord, a war veteran himself, sympathizes and offers to talk with Cutter personally. After stealing one of Cord's horses, Cutter charges through the festivities and suddenly crashes through the window. As Cutter lies dying from his injuries, Bone accuses Cord of killing the girl, and Cord responds ambiguously. Bone steadies Cutter's gun in Cutter's hand and fires as the film cuts to black.

== Cast ==
Credits from the AFI Catalog of Feature Films.

- Jeff Bridges as Richard Bone
- John Heard as Alex Cutter
- Lisa Eichhorn as Maureen "Mo" Cutter
- Stephen Elliott as J.J. Cord
- Arthur Rosenberg as George Swanson
- Nina van Pallandt as Woman In The Hotel
- Ann Dusenberry as Valerie Duran
- Francis X. McCarthy as Paul Savage
- Patricia Donahue as Mrs. Cord
- Geraldine Baron as Susie Swanson
- George Dickerson as Mortician
- Jack Murdock as Concession Owner
- Billy Drago as Garbageman
- Chris Noth as Guard (uncredited)

== Production ==
A friend of Jeffrey Alan Fiskin had Fiskin send a screenplay to Paul Gurian, a would-be film producer. Gurian eventually informed Fiskin that he had bought the rights to the novel Cutter and Bone, and wanted to meet with Fiskin in Los Angeles. Fiskin, who had little money, stole a copy of the book to read. In a 1981 interview, he said of the novel "The set-up's great, the characters are fine. But the last half of the book is an instant replay of Easy Rider. You cannot make a film out of this." Gurian agreed and hired Fiskin to write the screenplay. Gurian arranged for the studio EMI to back the film financially, with Robert Mulligan to direct and Dustin Hoffman to play Alex Cutter. A scheduling conflict forced Hoffman to leave the project, that prompted Mulligan to leave as well and EMI to pull its money.

Gurian took the film to United Artists, where the studio's vice president, David Field, became interested in backing it. Gurian gave Fiskin a list of directors; Ivan Passer's name was the only one the screenwriter did not recognize. Fiskin and United Artists executives screened Passer's Intimate Lighting and agreed he was the man to direct Cutter and Bone. Passer was involved with another film, but after reading Fiskin's script, chose to do Cutter and Bone instead .

The initial budget was $3.3 million, but Field learned that United Artists would produce the movie only if the budget was $3 million and a star joined the cast. The studio liked Jeff Bridges' work in the dailies for Michael Cimino's Heaven's Gate and insisted on him for Cutter and Bone. Passer cast John Heard after seeing him in a Joseph Papp Shakespeare in the Park production of Othello. The studio wanted a star, but the director insisted on Heard. Lisa Eichhorn was cast as Mo after she auditioned with Bridges. Filming took place in Santa Barbara, California.

== Release ==
United Artists did not like the ambiguity in what was then titled Cutter and Bone. When UA executives David Field and Claire Townsend, the film's biggest supporters, left for 20th Century Fox, the studio felt that they would get no credit if the film succeeded and no responsibility if it failed and so there was no interest in it. Cutter and Bone became a victim of internal politics. UA senior domestic sales and marketing vice president Jerry Esbin saw the film and decided that it did not have any commercial possibilities. Passer did not see his film with a paying audience until the Houston International Film Festival many weeks later. He said in an interview, "They didn't do any research. I was supposed to have two previews with a paying audience. It was in my contract."

== Reception ==
=== Critical response ===
==== Initial negative response ====
United Artists spent a meager $63,000 on promotion for the film's release in New York City in late March 1981. The three daily papers and the three major network critics gave Cutter and Bone negative reviews. Vincent Canby in The New York Times wrote "[I]t's the sort of picture that never wants to concede what it's about. It is, however, enchanted by the sound of its own dialogue, which is vivid without being informative or even amusing on any level." The studio was so shocked by the negative reviews that it planned to pull the film after only a week.

==== Later positive response ====
Unbeknownst to them, the next week Richard Schickel in Time, David Ansen in Newsweek, and New York City's weekly newspapers would write glowing reviews. Ansen wrote, "Under Passer's sensitive direction, Heard gives his best film performance: he's funny and abrasive and mad, but you see the self-awareness eating him up inside." Journalists at The Village Voice were also early champions of the film, with two critics offering positive reviews of the movie. After its re-release, the paper continued its efforts, posting a glowing profile on Passer.

The positive reviews prompted United Artists to give Cutter and Bone to its United Artists Classics division, which changed the film's title to Cutter's Way (thinking that the original title would be mistaken by audiences for a comedy about surgeons) and entered it in film festivals. At Houston, Texas's, Third International Film Festival, it won Best Picture, Best Director, Best Screenplay, and Best Actor (John Heard). A week later, it received the closing-feature slot at the Seattle International Film Festival. With a new ad campaign, Cutter's Way reopened in the summer of 1981 in Seattle, Los Angeles, Boston, and New York City. Passer was bitter about the experience, commenting in an interview, "You can assassinate movies as you can assassinate people. I think UA murdered the film. Or at least they tried to murder it."

==== Retrospective reviews ====
Jonathan Rosenbaum of The Chicago Reader later wrote that it was "probably Ivan Passer's best American feature...with a wonderful performance by Lisa Eichhorn and shimmering, hallucinatory cinematography by Jordan Cronenweth." John Patterson of The Guardian called it "note-perfect" and a "masterpiece," praising all three of the lead performances while acknowledging the film required multiple viewings to perceive its strengths.

Cutter's Way holds a rating of 92% on Rotten Tomatoes, based on 24 reviews. The site's consensus reads, "A suitably cynical neo-noir that echoes the disillusionment of its era, Cutter's Way relies on character-driven drama further elevated by the work of an outstanding cast".

=== Awards and nominations ===
Institution	Year	Category	Nominee	Result
Belgian Film Critics Association	1983	Grand Prix	Cutter's Way	Won
Edgar Awards	1982	Best Motion Picture Screenplay	Jeffrey Alan Fiskin	Won
National Society of Film Critics	1982	Best Supporting Actress	Lisa Eichhorn	Nominated
Writers Guild of America	1982	Best Adapted Screenplay	Jeffrey Alan Fiskin	Nominated

== Themes and interpretation ==
In an interview with the Washington Post following the release of Cutter’s Way, Passer explained his motivations for directing a film that contained more honest representations of life for soldiers after war:

“Cutter” was not your average commercial sure thing. One reason I wanted to do this story was that I was getting sick to my stomach of what I called the cripple mania. Jon Voight in Coming Home, and various TV shows, the good guys got wounded and they were even better after that. I felt there was an absolute distortion of what actually goes on when somebody gets maimed internally or physically. It doesn’t usually make them better people. Most of the time, from what I have seen, it makes them dangerous.

With this darker and more realistic portrayal of veterans, Passer was informing audiences of an aspect of the American experience which studios were not eager to reveal. In other interviews, Passer even went so far as to heavily insinuate that his depiction of Cutter as a disabled and disillusioned veteran was a key reason the UA tanked the budget of the film. Even after the release of popular neo-noir movies featuring troubled Vietnam veterans—see Taxi Driver (1976) and Rolling Thunder (1977)—there was still significant resistance to showing soldiers returning home as anything other than empowered heroes. Despite this, Passer did not refrain from having Cutter voice strong anti-war views. In addition to his general state of bitter indignation throughout the movie, Cutter also explicitly criticizes the United States. In one scene where Cutter and Bone are arguing over blackmailing Cord, Cutter goes on a tirade about the morality of life, explaining:

I watched the war on TV like everybody else. Thought the same damn things. You know what you thought when you saw a picture of a young woman with a baby lying face down in a ditch, two gooks. You had three reactions, Rich, same as everybody else. The first one was real easy: “I hate the United States of America.” Yeah. You see the same damn thing the next day and you move up a notch. “There is no God.” But you know what you finally say, what everybody finally says, no matter what? “I’m hungry.”

In many ways, Cutter’s brutal evaluation of violence and humanity reflects a larger attitude of the film that is very clearly anti-war. Though Cutter denies that trauma is what drives him to drink—at one point he even claims “Tragedy, I take straight”—Passer shows the ghastly effects of service in Vietnam. Not only does Cutter mentally suffer from post-traumatic Stress Disorder (PTSD), but he is also physically missing an arm, a leg, and an eye.

=== Noir influences ===
Because of its themes of revenge and alienation, Cutter’s Way has often been placed in the neo-noir movie genre by film critics. In one of the positive reviews posted in The Village Voice, Jim Hoberman deemed the movie to be a neo-noir. He explained that Passer had created “a thriller but also a critique, underscoring its surgical title by performing a deft and mordant postmortem on the remains of the 1960s counterculture.” Similarly, in his review of the movie, Jonathan Rosenbaum—the same critic who called it Passer's best American feature—also noted that the movie was making a "major statement about post-60s disillusionment." Throughout the movie, Passer provides critiques of American culture, but he does not give any political solutions. When he was asked about this somewhat ambiguous message of the movie, Passer stated that "this film is about pulling a trigger — what it takes." This introspective approach, along with both the violent ending and the complex and winding plot, in Cutter's Way are typical neo-noir staples.

In addition to the similar themes and motifs Cutter's Way shares with older noir films, the movie also was shot with clear noir influences. For Passer, it was important that viewers understood the gloomy nature of the movie, and with the help of his cinematographer Jordan Cronenweth, he attempted to remove the color blue from the film. According to Brendan Boyle in his review of the movie in The Ringer, Cronenweth “de-emphasized blues in favor of a muted, earthy scheme that Passer acknowledged as an homage to black-and-white cinematography—a noir in color, but barely.”

== See also ==
- The Big Lebowski
- List of cult films
