= Sad but True (Tex, Don and Charlie album) =

Studio album by Tex, Don and Charlie
- Released: November 1993
- Recorded: November 1992
- Studio: Metropolis Studios, Melbourne
- Genre: Country blues, folk blues, country
- Label: Red Eye
- Producer: Tony Cohen

Tex, Don and Charlie chronology
Sad but True (1993)	Monday Morning Coming Down... (1995)

Sad but True is the debut studio album by Australian rock band Tex, Don and Charlie. It was released in November 1993. It spent 6 weeks in the Australian charts, peaking at number 40. In 2010, it was listed in the book, 100 Best Australian Albums.

== Content ==
In early 1992, Don Walker, Charlie Owen, James Cruickshank and Tex Perkins played an acoustic live performance for alternative radio station JJJ. All were already well known within the Australian music industry. Walker had been in Cold Chisel, Perkins was in The Cruel Sea and Beasts of Bourbon, Cruickshank in The Cruel Sea, and Owen was a noted session guitarist. Their cover of Bob Dylan's "Blind Willie McTell" from this session appeared on the album JJJ album Totally Wireless.

Perkins, who had originally seen Owen playing with New Christs, later said, "I saw Charlie and thought 'Jesus Christ'. He was easily the best rock guitar player I had seen. He was really dexterous, but gutsy. Not flashy. I think it had a lot of jazz in him as well. I made a mental note that I'd like to work with Charlie and about one year later I heard he was playing with Don Walker in Catfish. Then somebody suggested I do something with Don Walker and I said 'Sure, as long as Charlie Owen is there'. Walker said, "The first time I clapped eyes on Tex was when he came in my front door, and the next thing I noticed was that he opened his mouth & sung a song or two, and he had this extraordinary voice."

Six months later, Perkins proposed a recording with Walker. After comparing songs, they felt they had enough material for an album and Owen was again approached. Walker claimed, "I had the most fun I've had recording an album for maybe 12 or 13 years. It wasn't an album approached with any kind of seriousness. It was always going to be a couple of afternoons in a studio and a jam. It wasn't until after we had it all done that we started to realise that we might have something special."

Owen contributed the raucous instrumental "Dead Dog Boogie" that appears at the mid-point of the album. "It was the very last song we did," Perkins explained. "All the rest of the songs, there’s so much restraint, and this is like the huge vomit everyone wanted to have!" Walker wrote or co-wrote just over half the songs with Perkins contributing 4. Perkins provided lead vocals to most of the songs, with some recorded as duets. Perkins later said, "More than once people have compared the dynamic to Kris Kristofferson and Willie Nelson singing together."

The recording was done mostly live. Walker said, "Until this project, I was relying heavily on vocal drop-ins and was meticulous in getting everything perfect and all that. On this project, I didn't have the opportunity. I was playing piano and singing at the same time so what I was singing was also going into the piano mike, so that was it."

The support players included noted musicians such as Kim Salmon, Warren Ellis and Jim White. Owen later recounted that Garrett Costigan attended the night before his recording "I said, 'You don’t have to be here,' and he said, 'Oh, I'd just like to see what you're doing.' When he came in to do his thing the next day, he sat there for half the song, and then - he just came in. It was like a bird in song…" Walker said, ""I originally wanted to get Garrett in on pedal steel for a couple of songs but Tex and Charlie said 'why?' because Charlie was already playing lap steel. But the two instruments are as different as chalk and cheese and once Tex and Charlie heard Garrett, they understood how he would fit into what Tex, Don & Charlie were doing."

Many of the songs recorded had been rejects from the authors' other bands. "Sitting in a Bar" had been recorded as a b-side by Jimmy Barnes. "Barlow and Chambers", a song about the execution of two drug traffickers in Malaysia, had been demoed and rejected before. "People said, 'Well, what would you want to write that for?" claimed Walker.

== Reception ==
"To these weather-crushed ears, Don's voice on Sad but True is a dead-ringer for Dylan's on Nashville Skyline."

−Tim Rogers

Although it was released in November 1993, the album didn't reach the charts until the end of January 1994. Perkins was nominated for Best Male Artist at the 1994 Aria Awards for his contributions to the album.

Reviewed at the time of release, Chris Whiting said it, "has a place & feel which reminds you of the Paris Texas album. It's relaxed but not sloppy, sparse but precise, the piano tinkling along with an acoustic guitar. Then the vocals wash in, with the steel guitar creeping in to swell out the mood. It captures the mood of wearied men sitting around in bars ruminating through cigarette coughs on lost lives & lost loves." The Sydney Morning Herald agreed, "The songs bring to life a low-life world of late-night bars, transvestites, girls with tattoos and lives gone wrong."

The Age described it as, "inhabiting a murky bayou somewhere between country, boogie and roots." The Canberra Times said, "this CD just oozes bitterness. The Walker-penned songs are not so depressing, but they are incisive and Owen's instrumental, "Dead Dog Boogie", is a perfect foil to all the deep and meaningfuls. Let's hope these three get together again." The Sydney Morning Herald called it, "a genuine beauty, a late-night collection of downbeat and often wittily mordant country ballads. The songs plaintively bring to life a low-life world of late-night bars, transvestites, girls with tattoos and lives gone wrong."

The book 100 Best Australian Albums said, "The genre, nominally, was country blues, with stories plucked from the night or passed along on the back verandah, as arid percussion, sighing pedal steel guitar and lyrical piano parts wended their way through the narratives. Aside from the rambunctious, psychedelic, country fair instrumental "Dead Dog Boogie", the tunes were long exhalations.

== Track listing ==
No.	Title	Writer(s)	Length
1.	"Redheads, Gold Cards And Long Black Limousines"	Walker, Michael Smotherman	3:38
2.	"Postcard from Elvis"	Dan Ehmig, Smotherman	3:56
3.	"Fake That Emotion"	Glenn Dormand, Perkins	5:49
4.	"The Girl with the Bluebird"	Walker	3:10
5.	"I Won't Do to You What I Done to Her"	Owen, Perkins	4:22
6.	"Sitting in a Bar"	Walker	4:16
7.	"Dead Dog Boogie"	Owen	3:41
8.	"Louise"	Walker	4:48
9.	"Fateful Day"	Walker	4:48
10.	"Danielle"	Walker	3:18
11.	"Still the Same"	Perkins	3:17
12.	"Barlow and Chambers"	Walker	3:37
13.	"I Must Be Getting Soft"	Perkins	3:56

== Personnel ==
- Tex Perkins – vocals, guitar
- Don Walker – vocals, keyboards
- Charlie Owen – guitar, dobro
- Shane Walsh – bass
- Jim White – drums
- Kim Salmon – jew's harp
- Garrett Costigan – pedal steel guitar
- Warren Ellis – violin

== Charts ==
Chart performance for Sad but True
Chart (1994)	Peak position
Australian Albums (ARIA)	40

== Release history ==
Release history and formats for Sad but True
Region	Date	Format	Label	Catalogue
Australia	November 1993	CD, Cassette	Red Eye Records, Polydor	REDCD37, 521183
Australia	2 March 2018	2×LP (reissue)	Red Eye Records, Polydor	5768318
