= Tex Perkins =

Australian musician (born 1964)

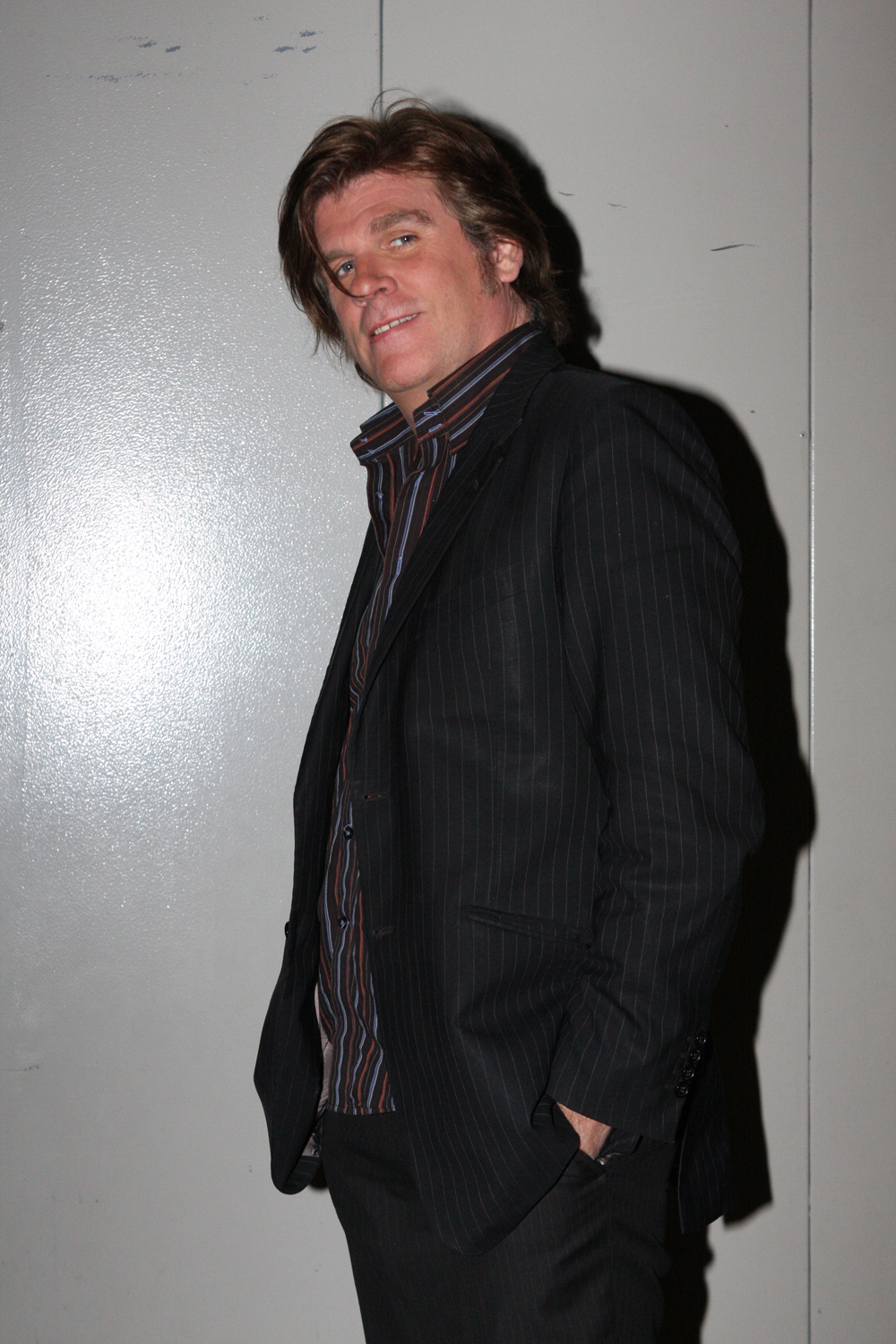
- Perkins in 2012

Background information
- Born: Gregory Stephen Perkins; 28 December 1964 (age 61); Darwin, Northern Territory, Australia
- Genres: Rock, folk blues, country
- Occupation: Musician
- Instruments: Vocals, guitar, harmonica
- Years active: 1982–present
- Member of: The Cruel Sea; Tex Perkins and the Fat Rubber Band; The Beasts
- Formerly of: Beasts of Bourbon; Tex, Don and Charlie; Tex Deadly and the Dum-Dums; Salamander Jim; Thug; TnT; Tex Perkins & His Ladyboyz; The Ape; The Band of Gold
- Website: texperkins.com.au

Gregory Stephen Perkins (born 28 December 1964), better known by his stage name Tex Perkins, is an Australian singer-songwriter who fronted the Australian rock band The Cruel Sea, but has also performed with the Beasts of Bourbon, Thug, James Baker Experience, The Butcher Shop, Salamander Jim, and Tex, Don and Charlie. He has also released many solo records. In 1997, a portrait of Tex Perkins by artist Bill Leak won the Packing Room award at the Archibald Prize.

== Career ==
=== 1980s: early groups ===
Perkins started his musical career in Brisbane cowpunk outfit Tex Deadly and the Dum-Dums, before moving to Sydney in 1982, garnering considerable attention in the Sydney independent music scene and also touring Melbourne, before the departure of guitarist Mark Halstead ended the band.

He later formed Salamander Jim with Kim Salmon from The Scientists and Richard Ploog from The Church. Due to touring commitments for Ploog & Salmon, Perkins formed a different line up with Stu Spasm, Lachlan McLeod and Martin Bland. In 1985 this line-up recorded and released their only record, an EP titled Lorne Greene Shares His Precious Fluids on Red Eye Records.

Perkins and Peter Read formed Thug in Sydney in 1987 when Read's flatmate had a fascination for collecting and amassing electronic equipment. After using some of the gear on initial recordings in Read's home studio, Perkins was eager to take it to the stage. Thug's live sets would last twenty to twenty-five minutes, featuring dancers and theatrics. Thug released two studio albums Mechanical Ape / Proud Idiots Parade in 1987 and Electric Woolly Mammoth in 1988.

=== 1983–present: Beasts of Bourbon ===
Beasts of Bourbon formed in Sydney in 1983. The original lineup comprised Perkins, Spencer P. Jones, James Baker, Kim Salmon and Boris Sudjovic. The band's first album, The Axeman's Jazz, was an underground success, but the group continued to be just a side project until 1988 when it reformed to record Sour Mash, followed by 1990's Black Milk and 1991's The Low Road. In 1993, the group toured extensively to support the double album From the Belly of the Beasts, then disbanded temporarily. It reformed to record Gone in 1997, which received lukewarm reviews, but produced a somewhat successful single, "Saturated".

In 2003, the group reformed again to record a live album, Low Life, released on Spooky Records. In December 2006 it was announced that Albert Productions had signed an exclusive worldwide recording deal with the band and on 23 April 2007, released a new album Little Animals. In August 2013 the band celebrated its 30th anniversary.

=== 1987–2003: The Cruel Sea ===
After toying with different band members, The Cruel Sea came into fruition in 1987 as Ken Gormley on bass, Jim Elliot on drums, Danny Rumour on guitars and James Cruikshank on keyboards and guitars. They took their name from a recording by the 1960s surf instrumental group, The Ventures. In 1989 Perkins (their then-lighting technician) started joining them onstage. This sparked an interest from Red Eye Records, and the band was signed and released a 1989 album Down Below. It received an ARIA Award nomination in 1993 following the release of a second album, This Is Not the Way Home in 1991.

The group's third album, The Honeymoon Is Over, released in 1993, and its title song, won five ARIA Music Awards of 1994. The Cruel Sea followed with a high-profile world tour. 1995 saw the release of the hugely successful Three Legged Dog album, which won the group another ARIA award. In 1998, The Cruel Sea released Over Easy in 1997 and Where There's Smoke in 2001.

=== 1992–2017: Tex, Don and Charlie ===
Tex, Don and Charlie is an Australian supergroup formed by Tex Perkins, Don Walker from Cold Chisel and guitarist Charlie Owen. Their first album Sad But True was released in 1993. They released a live album in 1995, Monday Morning Coming Down.... In March 2005, Tex, Don and Charlie released their second studio album All is Forgiven and a third, You Don't Know Lonely in 2017.

=== 2000–2015: Dark Horses ===
The Dark Horses band arose from the writing, recording and touring for the Dark Horses album (Slick/Grudge, 1592612). Members were initially Charlie Owen, Joel Silbersher, Murray Paterson and Jim Elliott. Later members include Richard Needham, Gus Agars, James Cruikshank and Steve Hadley.

Sweet Nothing (Slick/Grudge, 0384961) credited to Tex Perkins' Dark Horses, was released in 2003 followed by Tex Perkins & The Dark Horses (Dark Horse Records/Inertia DHR001) in 2011. Everyone's Alone (Dark Horse Records/Inertia DHR002) was released in 2012 and Tunnel at the End of the Light (Dark Horse Records/Inertia DHR003) in 2015.

On 10 June 2011, Tex Perkins & The Dark Horses released a new, self-titled album which peaked at number 73. Everyone's Alone was released in 2012 followed by Tunnel at the End of the Light in July 2015 and peaked at number 52.

=== 2021–present: Tex Perkins and the Fat Rubber Band ===
On 5 November 2021, Tex Perkins and his new band released the album Tex Perkins and the Fat Rubber Band. A track from this album, "Out There", was used in Warwick Thornton's 2021/2 vampire TV series, Firebite.

The band comprises:

- Tex Perkins – Vocals / Guitars / Keyboard / Bouzouki
- Matt Walker – Guitars / Vocals / Piano / Harmonica
- Stephen Hadley – Bass / Vocals
- Roger Bergodaz – Drums / Vocals
- Evan Richards – Percussion / Vocals

In March 2023, Tex Perkins and the Fat Rubber Band followed up with a second album, Other World.

=== Solo career and collaborations ===
In 1996, Perkins released his first solo studio album, Far Be It from Me, which peaked at number 43 on the ARIA Charts. In 2000, Perkins released his second solo studio album, Dark Horses which peaked at number 24 on the ARIA Charts. In 2003, Sweet Nothing was released which was credited to Tex Perkins' Dark Horses and peaked at number 34 on the ARIA Charts.

In 2006, Perkins worked with Tim Rogers and released the album My Better Half and credited it TnT. The album peaked at number 31 on the ARIA Charts.

In 2008, Perkins released the album No. 1's & No. 2's, credited to Tex Perkins And His Ladyboyz. In 2009, with Murray Paterson, he wrote the soundtrack to the Australian drama film Beautiful Kate. The album received an ARIA nomination for Best Original Soundtrack/Cast/Show Album for the soundtrack at the ARIA Music Awards of 2009.

In 2010 and 2011, Tex Perkins and The Tennessee Four (Shannon Bourne, guitar; Shane Reilly, guitar; Steve Hadley, bass; Dave Folley, drums) performed a series of shows in Australia and New Zealand, titled The Man in Black – The Johnny Cash Story, the show featured two hours of Johnny Cash's music interwoven with the story of his rise to stardom, his fight for survival and his eventual redemption. Tex Perkins (a baritone, as was Cash) and Rachael Tidd (as Cash's wife June Carter Cash), performed faithful renditions of Cash's songs while telling Cash's story in the third person between songs. During the show, Tex humorously emphasises the name of Cash's guitarist Luther Perkins. Tex Perkins and The Tennessee Four performed a further series of shows in 2013 and 2014.

In 2012, Perkins wrote and performed "Jesaulenko You Beauty" exclusively for The Marngrook Footy Show.

In 2015, Perkins collaboration with The Steel Springs on "One Minute's Silence", released on Anzac Day, to commemorate the centenary of the landing at Anzac Cove. The track, written by author Matthew Hardy, features The Welsh Choir and a spoken word performance by Australian rules football legend Ron Barassi.

== Film and TV appearances ==
Perkins has a cameo role in the 1998 Australian film, Praise. He appeared on Battle of the Choirs on the Seven Network in Australia in 2008. He has hosted RocKwiz numerous times. He voiced a cartoon shark in the 2011 Movie Extra animated series Shaaark.

== Personal life ==
Perkins is a supporter of the St Kilda Football Club in the Australian Football League and the Parramatta Eels in the National Rugby League.

He invented the sport of zoneball, a cross between Australian rules football and tennis. According to AFL player Bob Murphy, "Tex is to zoneball what Tom Wills is to footy ... The creator, the maestro, the master of ceremonies."

== Discography ==
=== Studio albums ===
List of studio albums, with selected chart positions
Title	Album details	Peak chart positions
Title	Album details	AUS
Far Be It from Me	Released: July 1996; Label: Polydor, Slick (533062-2); Format: CD	43
Dark Horses	Released: July 2000; Label: Slick, Grudge (1592612); Format: CD	24
Sweet Nothing (with Dark Horses)	Released: July 2003; Label: Slick, Grudge (0384961); Format: CD, LP	34
My Better Half (with Tim Rogers) (AKA TnT)	Released: August 2006; Label: Liberation Music (1707225); Format: CD	31
No. 1's & No. 2's (with & His Ladyboyz)	Released: October 2008; Label: Universal Music (1785241); Format: CD	61
Tex Perkins & The Dark Horses (with Dark Horses)	Released: June 2011; Label: Dark Horse Records, Inertia (DHR001); Format: CD, Music download	73
Tex Perkins & The Band of Gold (with The Band of Gold)	Released: August 2011; Label: Tex Perkins & The Band of Gold, Self Released; Format: CD, Music download	112
Everyone's Alone (with Dark Horses)	Released: November 2012; Label: Dark Horse Records, Inertia (DHR002); Format: CD, Music download	–
Tunnel at the End of the Light (with Dark Horses)	Released: July 2015; Label: Dark Horse Records, Inertia (DHR003); Format: CD, Music download	52
Tex Perkins and the Fat Rubber Band (as Tex Perkins and the Fat Rubber Band)	Released: 5 November 2021; Label: Source Music; Format: CD, Music download	146
Other World (as Tex Perkins and the Fat Rubber Band)	Released: 10 February 2023; Label: Source Music; Format: CD, Music download	–
Before the Show (with Matt Walker)	Released: 28 August 2026; Label: CHEER/XEL; Format: CD, Music download	116

=== Live album ===
List of live albums
Title	Album details
Live At Northcote Social Club (with Charlie Owen)	Released: 2007; Label: New Found Frequency; Format: CD, download

=== Soundtrack album ===
List of Soundtracks
Title	Album details
Beautiful Kate (with Murray Paterson)	Released: August 2009; Label: Level Two Music (L2012); Format: CD, download

=== Compilation albums ===
List of compilations, with selected chart positions
Title	Album details	Peak chart positions
Title	Album details	AUS
The Best of Tex Perkins	Released: August 2009; Label: Universal Music Australia (2715178); Format: CD, download	95

=== Video albums ===
List of video albums, with certifications
Title	Details	Certification
The Man In Black: The Johnny Cash Story	Released: 2010; Label: Majorbox Music	ARIA: Gold

=== Charted singles ===
List of charted singles in the top 200
Title	Year	Peak chart positions	Album
Title	Year	AUS	Album
"You're Too Beautiful"	1996	115	Far Be It from Me
"Splendid Life"	1996	145	Far Be It from Me
"I Know Y'Know I Know"	2000	136	Dark Horses
"Lucid" (with Dark Horses)	2003	145	Sweet Nothing

== Awards and nominations ==
=== AIR Awards ===
The Australian Independent Record Awards (commonly known informally as AIR Awards) is an annual awards night to recognise, promote and celebrate the success of Australia's Independent Music sector.

Year	Nominee / work	Award	Result	Ref.
2022	Tex Perkins & The Fat Rubber Band	Best Independent Country Album or EP	Nominated	

=== APRA Awards ===
The APRA Awards are held in Australia and New Zealand by the Australasian Performing Right Association to recognise songwriting skills, sales and airplay performance by its members annually.

Year	Nominee / work	Award	Result	Ref.
2024	"This Monin'" (Tex Perkins & The Fat Rubber Band)	Song of the Year	Shortlisted	
2024	"Brand New Man" by Tex Perkins and the Fat Rubber Band	Most Performed Blues & Roots Work	Nominated	
2026	"Straight Into the Sun" by The Cruel Sea (Tex Perkins / Daniel Atkins / Kristyna Higgins)	Most Performed Blues & Roots Work	Nominated	

=== ARIA Music Awards ===
The ARIA Music Awards are annual awards, which recognises excellence, innovation, and achievement across all genres of Australian music. They commenced in 1987.

Year	Nominee / work	Award	Result
1994	Sad But True	Best Male Artist	Nominated
1994	"The Honeymoon Is Over" (written by James Cruickshank, Tex Perkins, Dan Rumour)	Song of the Year	Won
1994	"Black Stick" (written by James Cruickshank, Tex Perkins, Dan Rumour)	Song of the Year	Nominated
1996	"You're Too Beautiful"	Best Male Artist	Nominated
1997	Far Be It from Me	Best Male Artist	Nominated
2001	Dark Horses	Best Male Artist	Nominated
2003	Sweet Nothing	Best Male Artist	Nominated
2009	Beautiful Kate (with Murray Paterson)	Best Original Soundtrack, Cast or Show Album	Nominated
2011	The Man in Black	Best Music DVD	Nominated
2011	Tex Perkins & the Dark Horses	Best Independent Release	Nominated

=== EG Awards / Music Victoria Awards ===
The EG Awards (known as Music Victoria Awards since 2013) are an annual awards night celebrating Victorian music. They commenced in 2006.

Year	Nominee / work	Award	Result
2009	Tex Perkins	Best Male	Unknown
