= Tex, Don and Charlie =

Australian folk blues supergroup

- Origin: Sydney, New South Wales Australia
- Genres: Folk blues, country
- Years active: 1992–1994, 2004-2006, 2017-present
- Members: Tex Perkins; Don Walker; Charlie Owen

Tex, Don and Charlie are an Australian supergroup formed by Tex Perkins, Don Walker and Charlie Owen. Their first studio album Sad but True was released in 1993, two others were released in 2005 and 2017.

== Career ==
Tex and Charlie at the Port Fairy Folk Festival

The band was founded in 1992 as Tex Perkins recalls "I saw Charlie and thought 'Jesus Christ'. He was easily the best rock guitar player I had seen. He was really dexterous, but gutsy. Not flashy. I think it had a lot of jazz in him as well. I made a mental note that I'd like to work with Charlie and about one year later I heard he was playing with Don Walker in Catfish. Then somebody suggested I do something with Don Walker and I said 'Sure, as long as Charlie Owen is there'."

In early 1992, the as yet unnamed band performed an acoustic live performance for alternative radio station Triple J with James Cruickshank also contributing guitar.

Six months later, Perkins proposed to Walker that they record an album together. Walker described the recording as a number of informal afternoons spent jamming in the studio. "It wasn't an album approached with any sort of seriousness. It wasn't until we had it all done that we started to realise we might have something special." The trio released Sad but True in November 1993 and album peaked at number 40. A live album was released in February 1995 titled Monday Morning Coming Down....

Over the next 10 years they all went their separate ways, but remained in contact.

In March 2005, Tex, Don and Charlie re-united and recorded All is Forgiven which was released in September 2005 and was supported by a tour. The song "Harry was a Bad Bugger", was described by Chris Johnston as, "the Australian song of the year", and by Mess & Noise as, "one of the finest Australian compositions of the last 20 years." The album was shortlisted for the inaugural Australian Music Prize.

In October 2010, Sad But True was listed in the book, 100 Best Australian Albums.

In May 2017, Perkins announced via his Facebook page that new music from Tex, Don and Charlie would be coming in 2017. The following week, a national tour was announced alongside the news of a new album from the trio, You Don't Know Lonely. A new single, "A Man in Conflict with Nature," was released on the same day. The album, released in June, peaked at number 14 in the national charts.

== Discography ==
=== Studio albums ===
List of studio albums, with selected chart positions
Title	Album details	Peak chart positions
Title	Album details	AUS
Sad but True	Released: November 1993; Label: Red Eye/Polydor (RED CD37); Format: CD	40
All is Forgiven	Released: September 2005; Label: Universal Music Group (9873229); Format: CD	58
You Don't Know Lonely	Released: June 2017; Label: EMI Music (5768318); Format: CD, DD, streaming	14

=== Live albums ===
List of live albums, with selected chart positions
Title	Album details	Peak chart positions
Title	Album details	AUS
Monday Morning Coming Down...	Released: February 1995; Label: Red Eye/Polydor (RED CD43); Format: CD	96

== Awards and nominations ==
=== Australian Music Prize ===
The Australian Music Prize (the AMP) is an annual award of $30,000 given to an Australian band or solo artist in recognition of the merit of an album released during the year of award. The commenced in 2005.

Year	Nominee / work	Award	Result
2005	All Is Forgiven	Australian Music Prize	Nominated
