= Murray Paterson =

Australian musician

Murray Paterson is an Australian songwriter and musician. He is most notable for his collaborations with Tex Perkins and his own recording project, Headland.

== Collaboration with Tex Perkins ==
The main vehicle for Paterson's collaborations with Tex Perkins was the band Dark Horses, but he also contributed to albums by Tex, Don and Charlie.

Paterson and Perkins co-scored the soundtrack for the film Beautiful Kate, the directorial feature debut from Rachel Ward. With Perkins he received an ARIA nomination in 2009 for Best Original Soundtrack/Cast/Show Album for the soundtrack.

== Headland ==
Headland is an Australian musical collective focussing on sound-scaping for film, often centred on surf culture and regional coastal landscapes. It is directed by Murray Paterson. It began as a film retrieval project in which 8mm film shot by amateur moviemakers involved with the Northern NSW surf culture in the 1970s was collected and archived. The resulting score LP, sound/track (HL01), was released in Australia in 2013 followed by a 2014 release in the UK and Europe. Subsequent Headland releases are the LPs True Flowers from This Painted World (HL03, 2017) and What Rough Beast (AGIT54, 2019) which was released in the UK through Agitated Records. A vinyl EP, Cosy (HL02), was released in 2014.

Since 2018 Headland has worked closely with filmmaker Ishka Folkwell producing bespoke soundtracks for a range of short and feature-length films. The films are primarily poetic travel-pieces featuring surfer Torren Martyn. Releases include: A Sense of Space (HL04, 2018) Nordurland (HL05, 2019) On Top of the World (HL06, 2020) Lost Track New Zealand (HL07, 2021) Bonney Upwelling (HL08, 2021) Lost Track Atlantic: Episode 1 (HL09, 2021) Lost Track Atlantic Episodes 2, 3 & 4 (HL011, 2021) Distant Shore (HL12, 2022) Slow Lane (HL13, 2023) Calypte (HL16, 2023) Reflection (HL17, 2024).

In 2021 Headland collaborated with Maanyung, a proud Aboriginal man with strong connections to Gumbaynggir and Yaegl nations.

The group has strong working relationship with The Surf Film Archive and has performed live scores to several presentations byJolyon Hoff of restored archival surf film. In 2022 and 2023 Headland produced full-length feature-film soundtracks for LightSoundArtFilm: Watandar tells the story of Afghan refugee and photographer Muzafar Ali; You Should Have Been Here Yesterday is an homage to Australia’s early surf-culture using a collage of lovingly restored footage from The Surf Film Archive.

=== Members ===
The collective of musicians is directed by multi-instrumentalist Paterson.

Members include Gus Agars, (Marlon Williams Band), Sam Anning, Pat Bourke (Dallas Crane), Amanda Brown (The Go-Betweens), Brock Fitzgerald (Wolf & Cub), Ken Gormly (The Cruel Sea), Dan Luscombe (The Drones), Skritch (Gota Cola), Joel Silbersher (GOD, Hoss, Tendrils), and Scott Tinkler (Australian Art Orchestra).

== Accolades ==
- MOJO Magazine gave True Flowers from This Painted World 4 Stars.
- The Sydney Morning Herald made sound/track album of the week and awarded it 4 Stars.
- MOJO Magazine gave What Rough Beast 4 Stars.
- Surfing the Headland reached the top ten in various shops in England in 2014, including Manchester.

=== Awards and nominations ===
The ARIA Music Awards is an annual awards ceremony held by the Australian Recording Industry Association. They commenced in 1987.

Year	Nominee / work	Award	Result	Ref.
2009	Beautiful Kate (with Tex Perkins)	Best Original Soundtrack, Cast or Show Album	Nominated	

== Other activities ==
Paterson lectured in contemporary art theory at Southern Cross University, Lismore, New South Wales between 1999 and 2013.

He received his Doctorate of Philosophy for the ficto-critical work Wonderstruck in 2002.

== Discography ==
=== Albums ===
==== With Headland ====
LPs with details
Title	Details
sound/track	Release: 2013; Format: Vinyl, CD, Digital; Headland Records (HL01)
True Flowers from this Painted World	Release: 2017; Format: Vinyl, CD, Digital; Headland Records (HL03)
A Sense of Space	Release: 2018; Format: Digital; Headland Records (HL04)
Nordurland	Release: 2019; Format: Digital; Headland Records (HL05)
What Rough Beast	Release: 2019; Format: Vinyl, CD, Digital; Agitated (AGIT054)
Lost Track: New Zealand	Release: 2020; Format: Digital; Headland Records
Lost Track Atlantic Episode 1	Release: 2021; Format: Digital; Headland Records (HL09)
Lost Track Atlantic Episodes 2, 3 & 4	Release: 2021; Format: Digital; Headland Records (HL11)
Distant Shore	Release: 2022; Format: Digital; Headland Records (HL12)
Slow Lane	Release: 2023; Format: Digital; Headland Records (HL13)
Watandar	Release: 2023; Format: Digital; Headland Records (HL14)
Something to do with love, but I don’t know what	Release: 2024; Format: Digital; Headland Records (HL16)

=== Extended plays ===
[edit]

EPs with details
Title	Details
Cosy EP	Released: 2015; Format: Vinyl; Label: Headland Records (HL02)
On Top of the World	Released: 2020; Format: Digital; Label: Headland Records (HL06)
Bonney Upwelling	Released: 202; Format: Digital; Label: Headland Records (HL08)
Bullfinch	Released: 2022; Format: Digital; Label: whitelabrecs (eR003)
Calypte	Released: 2023; Format: Digital; Label: Headland Records (HL16)
Reflection	Released: 2024; Format: Digital; Label: Headland Records (HL17)

==== With Tex Perkins ====
List of albums, with selected details
Title	Details
Beautiful Kate (Original Score) (with Tex Perkins)	Released: August 2009; Format: CD; Label: Level Two Music (L2012)
