= Gota Cola =

Australian musical group

- Origin: Brisbane, Queensland, Australia
- Genres: Alternative rock
- Label: Valve
- Members: Tylea Croucher; Lexie Gillespie; Skritch
- Past members: Brett Collery

Gota Cola is a three piece band from Brisbane, Queensland made up of Tylea, Lexie and Skritch. In 1998 Gota Cola released a self-titled EP through Valve. Their debut album, Guaranteed Rustless, was produced by Magoo and was released in 2001.

== Members ==
- Tylea Croucher
- Skritch
- Lexie Gillespie

== Discography ==
- Gota Cola EP (1998) - Valve
- Guaranteed Rustless (2001) - Valve
