= Charlie Owen (musician) =

Australian multi-instrumentalist and producer

- Born: Charles Lothian Lloyd Owen
- Occupations: Musician, producer
- Instruments: Guitar, banjo, mandolin, drums, organ, percussion, piano, harmonica, Jew's harp
- Years active: 1982–present
- Labels: Red Eye/Polydor, Normal/Return to Sender, Divine Rites, Dog Meat, Half A Cow

Charles Lothian Lloyd "Charlie" Owen is an Australian multi-instrumentalist and producer. He has been a member of The New Christs (1987–1990), Louis Tillett and His Cast of Aspersions (1990), Tex, Don and Charlie (1993–1995, 2005–2006), Tendrils (1994–1999) and Beasts of Bourbon (1996–1997, 2003). His solo album, Vertigo and Other Phobias, was released in 1994 on Red Eye/Polydor.

Owen has produced albums by The Plunderers, Louis Tillett (both solo and in a duo with Owen), Tex Perkins, and Penny Ikinger. As a session player, he has appeared on albums by Tony Buck, Kim Salmon and the Surrealists, Robert Forster, Spencer P. Jones, The Cruel Sea, Steve Prestwich, Conway Savage, Don Walker and Pendulum.

In May 2012 Australian Guitar magazine listed Owen in the Top 40 of Australia's best guitarists.

== Biography ==
=== Early years ===
Charles Lothian Lloyd Owen was raised with two older sisters, both became visual artists. Owen's father was a captain in the navy, he gave Owen preliminary piano and guitar lessons. His mother was a visual artist who tried to teach him to paint "Jesus how embarrassing, when all my friends were off trying to find cigarette butts to smoke and that... painting bloody pictures, but that was just what we did".

At about eight or nine-years-old he formed a duo, Hot Dogs, with a neighbour to play for their parents, they only knew part of "Walk, Don't Run", a surf-jazz instrumental from 1954 by The Ventures. While he was still at primary school the family relocated to Canberra and, at age 12 or 13, with an older friend he played at a youth club, Griffin Centre. His biggest influences were Django Reinhardt's "irreverence" and John Coltrane's "reverence".

Owen and his family moved to Brisbane, where he was "a bit lonely" and "just sat around in my room playing guitar". He formed a group with a saxophone player from music class at secondary school. Another group was OME (aka Original Music Ensemble), which was an improvisation group – most of his early playing was in musical theatre and jazz. He was also in Fabulous Dingo Family, co-founded by jazz composer David Pyle, and named after Azaria Chamberlain.

=== 1982–1986: Ninja Skill & Tango Bravo ===
In 1982 Owen was in a rock band called Ninja Skill, alongside Charlie Aber, John Caskey, Rick Caskey, Stephen Marskett and Larry Ponting. Owen left in 1984 and relocated to Sydney.

In 1985 Owen played with Tango Bravo. He described the group as a "commercial pop thing" and initially he had no particular concerns about the group's direction, however "we'd gotten some deal to make a single and I just went, 'No, this shit's too much'". Owen left the band shortly after.

=== 1987–1991: The New Christs and other session work ===
Owen's earliest recorded work was for Meera Atkinson, a performance poet, on her album, This Is the Planet, which was released in 1987. This album was produced by Rob Younger. Younger invited Owen to join a reformed version of The New Christs in 1987. With Younger on lead vocals, the line-up also had Jim Dickson (ex-Railroad Gin, Survivors, Passengers, Barracudas) on bass guitar and Louis Burdett (ex-Powerhouse, Ed Kuepper Band) on drums. As a member of The New Christs, Owen supplied guitar, piano and organ, as well as co-writing, for their debut album, Distemper (August 1989). Australian musicologist, Ian McFarlane, described the album as "the definitive statement on the band's sound and style. It contained a wealth of powerful tracks". However, later that year the group disbanded.

During 1987 Owen provided guitar for Louis Tillett's debut solo album, Ego Tripping at the Gates of Hell. Stuart Coupe from The Canberra Times described the album as "a wonderful mixture of jazz, blues and rock'n'roll. Above all it's a spirited, passionate and diverse performance from a little known figure on the fringes of the rock'n'roll scene".

Owen also worked with Tillett in the group, Paris Green, which "covered material ranging from Mose Allison to John Coltrane, Ray Charles to Nina Simone, and on any given night there was as many as nine or ten musicians on stage". In June 1988 Owen was the record producer for The Plunderers five-track extended play, Trust Us.

Owen completed session work on Penguins on Safari's Normal Soon and Tony Buck's The Shape of Things to Come (both 1989). Also that year Owen joined ex-Cold Chisel pianist and keyboardist, Don Walker, in a blues rock band, Catfish; which toured Australia. In 1990 Owen teamed with Tillet again, in Louis Tillett and His Cast of Aspersions, both produced the group's album, A Cast of Aspersions (April). McFarlane noted that it was "eclectic set of material driven by Tillett's booming baritone voice and smouldering organ, Owen's jagged guitar lines and the swinging brass arrangements".

Owen resumed work with Catfish, he appeared on their second album, Ruby (October 1991), and toured in support of its release. Also in 1991 Owen joined Divinyls on tour promoting their self-titled album issued January, Owen played rhythm guitar on Divinyls Live (recorded in 1991 and released in 1994) alongside founding mainstays, Chrissy Amphlett on lead vocals and Mark McEntee on lead guitar, together with Lee Borkman on keyboards, Jerome Smith on bass guitar, and Charley Drayton on drums.

=== 1992–present: Tex, Don and Charlie ===
Late in 1992, Tex Perkins contacted Owen and Walker to work together on four live-to-air tracks for a broadcast by national radio station, JJJ. It was recorded as JJJ Live at the Wireless. The trio made a "vague promise to do something more" in the future. The formed Tex, Don and Charlie and recorded their debut album, Sad But True which was released in November 1993. For the album Owen supplied guitar, dobro and lapsteel. It reached the top 40 on the ARIA Albums Chart.

The trio released a live album in 1995 titled, Monday Morning Coming Down.... In March 2005, Tex, Don and Charlie released their second studio album All is Forgiven and a third, You Don't Know Lonely in 2017. All four albums have charted in the ARIA top 100.

=== 1993–2000: Maurice Frawley and Working Class Ringos ===
In 1993 Owen, on dobro, lapsteel, banjo and organ, joined Maurice Frawley and Working Class Ringos, a rootsy country-blues band. Owen called them "the bad boys of folk" who played "the most passionate, beautiful, rollicking, cheeky, heartfelt music you could ever hear". Working Class Ringos released an extended play, Whoop Whoop in 1994 and followed with their debut album Livin' Lazy in May 1995.

=== 1994–1999: Tendrils ===
In 1994 Owen performed with Joel Silbersher and formed Tendrils (band)}. The duo issued a self-titled album in the 1995. and another album, Soaking Red, in 1998. The label promoted the album as "organic, darkly beautiful, sparse & intense". NME's reviewer found "tales of lives gone violently awry, set to elusive, near-impressionistic folkadelic orchestration. Organs proffer a narcotic balm, while guitars are picked with pointed economy, like the jibes of an estranged friend". At the ARIA Music Awards of 1999, Soaking Red was nominated for ARIA Award for Best Adult Alternative Album.

=== 1993–2008: Session work and Vertigo and Other Phobias ===
In June 1993 Owen, Chris Wilson, and three former members of The Triffids: David McComb, Robert McComb and Graham Lee guested on Acuff's Rose's debut studio album, Never Comin' Down. In December that year Owen rejoined Divinyls for another tour of Australia.

In 1994, Owen released his debut solo album, Vertigo and Other Phobias.

Owen was a session musician on albums: Robert Forster's I Had a New York Girlfriend, Spencer P. Jones' Rumour of Death (both 1994); The Cruel Sea's Three Legged Dog (April 1995); and Perkins' solo album, Far Be it from Me (1996).

Owen joined Perkins in a reformed line-up of Beasts of Bourbon in September 1996 alongside Brian Henry Hooper on bass guitar, Jones on guitar and Tony Pola on drums. This line-up recorded the group's fifth studio album, Gone, released in January 1997, which reached the Top 50 on the ARIA Albums Chart. The group disbanded again by the end of that year.

In 2000 Owen appeared on Steve Prestwich's Since You've Been Gone and Conway Savage's Nothing Broken. Also that year he produced and provided guitar for Perkins' second solo album, Dark Horses and joined Tex Perkins and the Dark Horses to promote its release. Also in the line-up were Silbersher, Murray Paterson, and Scritch.

In 2007, Owen released a live recording with Perkins, as Live at Northcote Social Club.

=== 2009–present: Death's Dateless Night ===
In May 2009 bandmate, Maurice Frawley, died of liver cancer. Owen worked with another of Frawley's bandmates, Paul Kelly, to organise a tribute album, Long Gone Whistle – The Songs of Maurice Frawley (August 2010). Also appearing on the 3× CD release were Amphlett, Perkins, Walker, The Drones, The Kill Devil Hills, Megan Washington and Dan Sultan. A follow-up concert in late August launched the album and raised money for one of Frawley's causes, Rochester Secondary College's music program.

In 2016, Owen collaborated with Paul Kelly on the album, Death's Dateless Night. The album peaked at number 16 on the ARIA charts and at the ARIA Music Awards of 2017 it was nominated for Best Blues and Roots Album.

=== 2025–present: Pendulum ===
In August 2025, Owen co-produced Inertia alongside Rob Swire for the Australian/UK legends Pendulum. This marks the group's first studio album in 15 years and is part of the reason his assistance was valuable in reproducing their signature sound, while striking a balance of more modern character for reaching a new generation's audience.

== Personal life ==
Charlie Owen is married to Kylie Greer, in 2002 the couple ran a suburban disco in Melbourne. By December 2012 the couple were running an art gallery, they reside in Arthurs Seat with their three children.

Fellow musician Paul Kelly wrote and performed "Charlie Owen's Slide Guitar", which was released on Kelly's 1998 album, Words and Music. Kelly recalled seeing a Tendrils' gig when "Charlie played a strange, harsh run of notes that seemed wrong to me at first. But when I heard them a second time, a verse or two later, they lifted my head clean off my shoulders". Kelly played the track for Owen backstage in Bendigo after a gig where Owen and Maurice Frawley had performed as a duo and they had been followed on stage by Kelly and Spencer P. Jones, also as a duo. While Kelly played the newly written song, Owen mistakenly believed they were "just sitting around making up lyrics and stuff ... they're taking the piss out of me, the pricks". Days later Owen had the situation clarified and later acknowledged that he was "flattered and touched" by Kelly's tribute.

In December 2005 Owen's Fender Telecaster Deluxe electric guitar and his 1930s Dobro Kluson slide guitar – referred to in Kelly's song – were stolen. Owen told The Age's Selma Milovanovic that "My sound on those instruments is what I'm known for. Those sort of guitars are very, very rare, they are unique. It's like having your heart ripped out. It's horrible". Some days later, the thief was caught but had on-sold the goods, Owen then paid a third-party $200 to buy back his guitars.

== Discography ==
=== Albums ===
List of albums, with selected chart positions
Title	Album details	Peak chart positions
Title	Album details	AUS
Vertigo and Other Phobias	Released: 1994; Format: CD; Label: Red Eye/Polydor (RED CD46)	—
The Ugly Truth (with Louis Tillett)	Released: 1994; Format: CD; Label: Return to Sender (RTS 05)	—
Midnight Rain (with Louis Tillett)	Released: 1995; Format: CD; Label: Return to Sender (RTS 18)	—
Live at Northcote Social Club (with Tex Perkins)	Released: 2007; Format: CD; Label: New Found Frequency; Note: Live album	—
Death's Dateless Night (with Paul Kelly)	Released: 7 October 2016; Format: CD, digital, LP; Label: Gawd Aggie (GAWD025)	16

=== See also ===
- Tex, Don and Charlie
- Tendrils

== Awards and nominations ==
=== ARIA Music Awards ===
The ARIA Music Awards is an annual awards ceremony that recognises excellence, innovation, and achievement across all genres of Australian music.

Year	Nominee / work	Award	Result	Ref.
1999	Soaking Red (as Tendrils)	Best Adult Alternative Album	Nominated	
2017	When We Fall	Best Blues and Roots Album	Nominated	
