= Ian Moss discography =

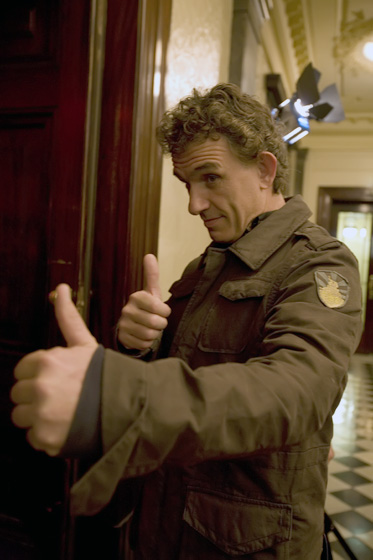
- Ian Moss in 2008
- Studio albums: 8
- Live albums: 2

This is a discography of the Australian rock singer-songwriter and guitarist Ian Moss.

== Albums ==
=== Studio albums ===
List of albums, with selected chart positions.
Title	Album details	Peak chart positions		Certifications
Title	Album details	AUS	NZ	Certifications
Matchbook	Released: August 1989; Label: Mushroom (TVD 93307); Formats: LP, MC, CD	1	19	ARIA: 2× Platinum
Worlds Away	Released: October 1991; Label: Mushroom (TVD 93350); Formats: CD	42	50	
Petrolhead	Released: August 1996; Label: TWA (TWAD107); Formats: CD	101	—	
Six Strings	Released: May 2005; Label: Liberation Blue (BLUE 84.2); Formats: CD	132	—	ARIA: Gold
Let's All Get Together	Released: July 2007; Label: Liberation Blue (BLUE 148.2); Formats: CD, digital	49	—	
Soul on West 53rd	Released: 16 October 2009; Label: Liberation Blue (LMCD0052); Formats: CD, digital	40	—	
Ian Moss	Released: 2 March 2018; Label: Liberation (BLOOD10); Formats: CD, LP, digital	11	—	
Rivers Run Dry	Released: 21 July 2023; Label: Mosstrooper (MOSSY001 & MOSSY002); Formats: CD, LP, digital	18	—	
"—" denotes a recording that did not chart or was not released in that territory.

=== Live albums ===
List of albums, with selected chart positions.
Title	Album details	Peak chart positions
Title	Album details	AUS
Ian Moss Live	Released: April 1997; Label: TWA (TWAD404); Format: CD; Recorded in Australia between 1996 and 1997	—
Live	Released: 24 July 2020; Label: Mosstopper (MOSSY1); Formats: 2×CD, digital, 2×LP (April 2024); Recorded in July 2018	123
Live at the Enmore	Released: 3 May 2024; Label: Mosstopper (MOSSY05); Formats: Digital, 2×LP; Recorded in February 2024	—
Live at Anitas	Released: 2 May 2025; Label: Mosstopper (MOSSY07); Formats: Digital, CD, 2×LP; Recorded during the Rivers Run Dry Solo Acoustic Tour in 2024	— (Note: Live at Anitas did not enter the ARIA top 100, but peaked at number 6 on the Australian Artist Albums chart.)
Together Alone: Live at the Ulumbarra Theatre (with Troy Cassar-Daley)	Released: 2 October 2026; Label: Mosstopper / Tarampa (TA002); Formats: Digital, CD, 2×LP; Recorded during the Together Alone Tour in 2022	49

== Extended plays ==
Title	Details
Together Alone Tour (with Troy Cassar-Daley)	Released: 25 February 2022; Label: Ian Moss & Troy Cassar-Daley; Formats: CD, Digital; Recorded live at Freight Train Studios

== Singles ==
List of singles, with selected chart positions, showing year released and album name
Title	Year	Peak chart positions		Certifications	Album
Title	Year	AUS	NZ	Certifications	Album
"Tucker's Daughter"	1988	2	6	ARIA: Platinum	Matchbook
"Telephone Booth"	1989	7	29		Matchbook
"Out of the Fire"	1989	29	—		Matchbook
"Mr. Rain"	1989	78	—		Matchbook
"Slip Away"	1991	56	—		Worlds Away
"She's a Star"	1991	74	—		Worlds Away
"Never Give Up"	1992	128	—		Worlds Away
"Poor Boy"	1996	180	—		Petrolhead
"Petrol Head"	1996	promo	—		Petrolhead
"All Alone on a Rock"	1997	156	—		Petrolhead
"Message from Baghdad"	2005	promo	—		Six Strings
"Love Will Carry Us Along"	2005	promo	—		Six Strings
"Let's All Get Together"	2007	promo	—		Let's All Get Together
"Happy Days""	2007	promo	—		Let's All Get Together
"Shake/Let's Stay Together"	2009	—	—		Soul on West 53rd
"Broadway"	2017	—	—		Ian Moss
"If Another Day (Love Rewards Its Own)"	2018	—	—		Ian Moss
"Hold On (To What We Got)"	2018	—	—		Ian Moss
"South" (Troy Cassar-Daley featuring Ian Moss)	2021	—	—		The World Today
"Rivers Run Dry"	2023	—	—		Rivers Run Dry
"Nullarbor Plain"	2023	—	—		Rivers Run Dry
"Open Your Eyes"	2024	—	—		Rivers Run Dry
"Style"	2024	—	—		Non-album single
"While My Guitar Gently Weeps" (with Hindley Street Country Club)	2024	—	—		Non-album single
"Lately" (with Swanee)	2026	—	—		Believe (Deluxe)
"The Dark End of the Street" (with Troy Cassar-Daley)	2026	—	—		Together Alone: Live At The Ulumbarra Theatre
"—" denotes a recording that did not chart or was not released in that territory.

== Videos ==
List of videos, with certification
Title	Details	Certifications
Live At the Hordern	Released: 1990; Label: Virgin (VIR 350); Formats: VHS	AUS: Platinum

== Other appearances ==
List of other non-single song appearances
Title	Year	Album
"We're All Gunna Die" (Don Walker featuring Ian Moss)	1995	We're All Gunna Die
"Sunshine" (live)	1998	Good Vibrations - A Concert for Marc Hunter - The Live Event
"April Sun in Cuba" (live) (with Peter Garrett and Ross Wilson)	1998	Good Vibrations - A Concert for Marc Hunter - The Live Event
"Cry Me a River" (live)	1998	Good Vibrations - A Concert for Marc Hunter - The Live Event
"Tucker's Daughter" (live)	1998	Mushroom 25 Live
"Sunshine" (Marcia Hines featuring Ian Moss)	2004	Hinesight (Songs from the Journey)
"Georgia"	2008	A Tribute To Lobby Loyde, Billy Thorpe And Peter Wells
"Working Class Man" (Jimmy Barnes featuring Ian Moss and Jonathan Cain)	2014	30:30 Hindsight
"When the War Is Over" (live) (Jimmy Barnes featuring Ian Moss)	2020	Music from the Home Front
"Reflections" (Jimmy Barnes featuring Ian Moss)	2022	Soul Deep 30
"Wildfires" (Brad Cox featuring Ian Moss)	2023	Acres
"Straight from My Heart" (Kevin Borich featuring Ian Moss)	2023	Duets
"Lately" (with Swanee)	2025	Believe

== See also ==
- Cold Chisel discography
