= Love Songs (Don Walker album) =

Studio album by Don Walker
- Released: 7 August 2026
- Length: 46:28
- Label: Salt

Don Walker chronology
Lightning in a Clear Blue Sky (2023)	Love Songs (2026)

Love Songs is the fifth album by Australian musician Don Walker, released on 7 August 2026. It debuted a 41 on the Australian charts, the highest of Walker's solo albums.

== Background ==
Don Walker had been the keyboardist and main songwriter with successful Australian rock band Cold Chisel. After their split in 1983, Walker had intended to retire from the music industry. In 1988, he released the first of two albums under the name Catfish. In 1995, he released the first album under his own name. As well as his occasional solo records, he recorded with a reformed Cold Chisel and as a member of Tex, Don and Charlie. Love Songs is his fifth solo album.

== Recording and composition ==
Walker said that all of the songs are love songs "in a way. If you allow that some of the love songs are not first person." He added, "At some stage early on, the title and that thread appeared. I don’t quite know where from, but it meant me looking back through the vaults to see what songs I had there that might fit with the already existing catalogue songs."

Most of the songs were recorded in 2024. "Luck" and "Fly Away" were earlier recorded with Roy Payne and not selected for Lightning in a Clear Blue Sky. "Could You Still Be Here" was recorded straight to DAT tape "around the turn of the century". Walker said, "In the 90s, I was living in a big house in Elizabeth Bay with a beautiful basement with a wide area of parquetry and that's where my piano was. Largely because of the room, the sound is beautiful."

"Darwin", written when Walker was living in Singapore, had been demoed with Glen Hannah on guitar and previously released on Walker's Live at the Camelot Lounge, where the 14-minute song had a 7-minute introduction. The song views Darwin as a "place of last resort" where people operate under a fictitious name and life story. Walker describes it as a love song to "a plastic chair and a beer under the stars."

Don Walker with the Harmonettes

The song "Luck" was co-written with Thomas Busby and originally released on Busby Marou's album Farewell Fitzroy in 2013. Busby had brought the music to a writing session with Walker. It was nominated for Blues and Roots Work of the Year at the 2014 APRA Awards. Jason Isbell was given a writing credit due to the melodic similarities to his song, "Alabama Pines".

"Let's All Get Together" had been recorded by Kate Ceberano in 2003, James Blundell in 2006, and by Ian Moss on the album of the same name in 2007. Walker had demoed the song as a salsa "as best I understand that" with Mark Punch. Walker said, "I was always in love with this demo. It's an attempt to get the impact of watching my first salsa band in Sydney, which was wonderful."

"The Girl I Used to Know" had been written in the 90s and rejected by Cold Chisel. Walker said, "And so I rewrote it. I thought 'There's some sort of structural problem.' So I cut it up and rewrote it and made it a really simple generic song. I pitched that: No bites. My fucking Cold Chisel bandmates are deaf. Always have been. These guys need their ears syringed."

== Reception ==
Beat said, "Although listeners feel in safe hands, meticulously placed melodic detours make Love Songs an enthralling listen. Yet another masterpiece for the Walker discography. Australian Musician said, "Walker moves effortlessly between sparse, piano-led storytelling and beautifully layered arrangements of guitars, steel, horns and harmonies. The result is a record that feels both timeless and immediate." Rhythms said it "may well prove to be his masterpiece."

Australian Arts Review said, "Of the five solo albums Walker has produced, Love Songs stands head and shoulders above what he has produced in the past, as he delivers a work that is superbly realised and timeless in its execution."

== Track listing ==
All songs written and composed by Don Walker, except "Luck" by Walker/Busby/Isbell

No.	Title	Length
1.	"Let's All Get Together"	4:28
2.	"Breakfast in Paris"	3:19
3.	"Deeper Light"	3:55
4.	"Luck"	4:49
5.	"Fly Away"	3:33
6.	"Could You Still Be Here"	3:09
7.	"The Girl I Used to Know"	4:28
8.	"It Will Always Be You"	4:30
9.	"Darwin"	14:16

== Personnel ==
=== The Suave Fucks ===
- Don Walker – lead vocals, keyboards
- Roy Payne – guitar on "Luck" and "Fly Away"
- Shannon Bourne – guitar except "Luck" and "Fly Away", backing vocals
- Garrett Costigan – pedal steel, backing vocals
- Hamish Stuart – drums, backing vocals
- Michael Vidale – bass, backing vocals

=== The Harmonettes ===
- Amanda Roff – backing vocals
- Erica Dunn – backing vocals
- Brigitte Hart – backing vocals
- Felicity Cripps – backing vocals
- Alexandra Scott-Douglas – backing vocals

=== Additional ===
- Mark Punch – additional guitar and backing vocals on "Let's All Get Together"
- Sam Lemann – additional guitar and mandolin on "Darwin"
- Charlie Owen – lap steel on "Deeper Light"
- Juanita Tippens – backing vocals on "Luck"
- Michael Fraser – trumpet
- Gianni Maranucci – trumpet
- David Palmer – trombone
- Paul Williamson – tenor/baritone saxophone

== Charts ==
Chart performance for Love Songs
Chart (2026)	Peak position
Australian Albums (ARIA)	41
