= Unlimited Address =

Studio album by Catfish
- Released: 17 October 1988
- Recorded: 1988
- Genres: Rock, jazz, funk
- Length: 33:40
- Labels: WEA Records (LP); Salt Records (CD reissue)
- Producers: Peter Walker; Don Walker

Catfish chronology
| Unlimited Address (1988) | Ruby (1991) |

re-release cover

Singles from Unlimited Address
- 1. "When You Dance" Released: 18 April 1988; 2. "Early Hours" Released: 19 September 1988; 3. "Hiwire Girl" Released: 13 March 1989

Unlimited Address was the debut album by Australian band Catfish. Released in 1988, it spent one week in the Australian charts, peaking at number 50. Singles from the album, "In the Early Hours" and "Hi-Wire Girl", charted in Australia at number 72 and 146 respectively.

== Background ==
Don Walker had been the main songwriter and piano player with Australian rock band Cold Chisel. He was the author of many of their hit songs, but rarely sang with them. When the band split in 1983, other members launched solo careers, but Walker travelled extensively through the Soviet Union, Asia and Europe. He intended to retire from the music industry. He said, "I found myself in the rare position of having a reasonable amount of money, unlimited time and no ties, so I just took off. I mapped out a vague course that would take me a couple of years to cover most continents, and with the understanding that if I ever found myself in a place that took my fancy, I could get a job in a piano bar."

== Album details ==
In 1988, Walker signed a contract with WEA with the aim of recording under the name Catfish. Although using a band name, Walker was the sole ongoing member, public face and vocalist. He initially recorded bass and basic keyboard parts using a Fairlight CMI series 2, but the bass parts were later re-recorded by Ian Belton. Walker later said, "I’d worked it down to every note that I wanted played so I was sort of a control freak at that stage. I remember Ricky Fataar begging me 'For God's sake can you turn this Fairlight off that I’m playing along with, can you just get a bass player.' The Fairlight had every bass note where I wanted it and I’d spent years writing it."

David Blight featured heavily on harmonica, and Ian Moss provided some guitar breaks. Walker chose not to have the contributing musicians listed in the liner notes, claiming it would be "too long and boring."

The album showed a different side to Walker's songwriting, reflecting his travels during the previous years. Walker said that many of the songs were initially written for his own amusement before Catfish was conceived. One review described it as, "a weird amalgam of torch songs, Eastern European cabaret and funk." Walker said, "Catfish was designed with a specific sound in mind and I didn't want session musicians. All of the people playing on this album have a strong personality which has affected the overall sound." Elsewhere, he noted, "To me it sounds eastern European. I wanted to make something that was vaguely a European disco album."

The press release for the album said, "twenty-five thousand miles of road and rail have carved through the last five years of your life, and there's a pile of songs lying there like shavings on a workbench. If you had friends like harmonica player David Blight and guitarist Peter Walker, you could set these songs in a sound dredged up from the bottom of a mangrove swamp."

Walker also noted the album was "pushing the boundaries of musical structure", saying "there are some songs that, structurally, are nothing like nothing else. With songs like "Subway" I was trying to write songs like John Barth writes novels; instead of being linear they follow spirals, although I'm talking about things I really don't know a lot about there."

The song "Unlimited Address" was a reworking of an early unreleased Cold Chisel song, "Five-Thirty ETA". In its original form, it was described by Walker as, "a truck-driving story song with too many lyrics."

"In The Early Hours" was written and recorded after the rest of the songs on the album. It featured Tony Cook and Ronald Laster who were touring Australia in James Brown's band at the time. Walker said, "I immediately felt it was a single, a hit. I was really ambitious at that stage, fool that I was, and I was really concerned that because a record company had signed me to make solo records, that I should be providing radio singles."

Walker later noted the album was, "produced by Peter Walker and even though I was feeling my way as a singer, he managed to get good performances. And it also took me those two Catfish albums to try and figure out what I should be doing, as far as what kind of songs suit the tales that I have to tell."

In 2010, the album was re-released with new cover artwork. The album was remastered by Don Bartley, and the songs "One Night in Soviet Russia" and "Subway" were remixed by Phil Punch. The previous record label had lost the masters, but Walker had the original tapes in storage, allowing him to recreate the album. He said, "I redid some things and had some fun with it."

== Critical reception ==
Reviewed at the time of release, Juke said, "The songwriting on Unlimited Address isn't just good, it's engaging. The lyrics are full of clever twists and interesting wordplay, while the melodies are finely tuned and skilfully created. Take your time with this album and its enigmas." The Canberra Times noted that the album may appeal to Cold Chisel fans, but the music was markedly different from his old band. "Brassy blues is the order, though a pop-rock flavour shines through some of the tracks. Walker is not about to limit himself to just one style. He moves subtly, almost quietly, from one mood to another." Rolling Stone Australia noted Walker, "toured through Australia, Asia and Eastern Europe. These songs are linked by the narratives, the stories of cafes and bars in Europe and caravan parks in the Territory. There is the sense of detachment, a touch of voyeurism and an attempt to get some external reality into an emotional search."

Shawn Sequeira later said of the album, "This might very well be regarded as one of our greatest pieces of contemporary music that slipped under the commercial radar. And no one knows why." Upon release, the album received minimal radio play. Walker later said, "It was the 80s and it was the real butt-end of disco and music was incredibly bad in every direction. This is a world where "Footloose" was the pinnacle and I was writing 13 minute songs about the slums of Manila – nobody wanted to do that kind of thing in that environment so I had to do it myself."

Despite having written many of Cold Chisel's songs, Walker suffered from being less well known than former band-mates Jimmy Barnes and Ian Moss, who both released hit albums (the very successful Ian Moss album Matchbook was largely written by Walker). Tracee Hutchison said, "Despite Walker's brilliant feel for this genre, the relative lack of impact of Catfish is an interesting indictment on the nature and machinations of band chemistry. Without Barnes, Don Walker lost the outlet for his craft."

Reviewing the re-release, Inpress said, "Although steeped in the decade in which it was made, the album sounds timeless. It's dark, suave, and brilliantly worded, spanning smouldering confessionals and deconstructed funk and Motown."

== Track listing ==
All songs written and composed by Don Walker

| No. | Title | Length |
|---|---|---|
| 1. | "When You Dance" | 3:11 |
| 2. | "Hiwire Girl" | 2:52 |
| 3. | "In the Early Hours" | 5:07 |
| 4. | "Subway" | 3:28 |
| 5. | "One Night in Soviet Russia" | 3:55 |
| 6. | "My Backyard (The Moon Over Manila)" | 5:59 |
| 7. | "Pre-War Blues" | 3:48 |
| 8. | "Station" | 2:40 |
| 9. | "Unlimited Address" | 4:40 |

== Charts ==
| Chart (1988) | Peak position |
|---|---|
| Australian Albums (ARIA) | 50 |

== Personnel ==
- Don Walker – Lead vocals, Keyboards
- Ian Moss – Guitar
- Peter Walker – Guitar
- David Blight – Harmonica
- Ian Belton – Double bass
- Ricky Fataar – Drums

Production

- Don Walker – Record producer
- Peter Walker – Record producer
- Chris Lord-Alge – Executive producer

Engineering

- Don Walker – Mixing
- Chris Lord-Alge – Mixing (tracks: 1,3)
- Don Bartley – Mastering
- Peter Walker – Engineering, Mixing

Album artwork

- Tim Bauer – Photography, Album cover design
