= Six Strings =

Studio album by Ian Moss
- Released: May 2005
- Studio: The Clarendon Hotel, Katoomba; The Sandringham Hotel, Newton
- Genre: Pop rock
- Length: 65:30
- Label: Liberation Music

Ian Moss chronology
Ian Moss Live (1998)	Six Strings (2005)	Let's all Get Together (2007)

Singles from Six Strings
- 1. "Message from Baghdad" Released: 2005; 2. "Love Will Carry Us Along" Released: 2005

Six Strings is the fourth studio album by Australian musician Ian Moss, released in May 2005. It is the first acoustic album recorded by Moss and includes re-recorded tracks from his solo career, Cold Chisel songs and covers.

Moss said “It took a bit of nerve for me to unplug and play acoustic, but it injected this freshness into my playing. It was a significant new path for me.”

In 2015, Moss announced a national acoustic theatre tour in celebration of the 10th anniversary of Six Strings with Moss saying "I'm amazed at how much colour and variation and emotion I've been able to get with just voice, guitar and a foot tapping on the floor. Less is more.". The album was re-released with five extra tracks and a couple of alternate versions and was certified gold in Australia in 2015.

== Track listing ==
BLUE084.2
No.	Title	Writer(s)	Length
1.	"Telephone Booth"	Don Walker	3:13
2.	"Saturday Night"	Walker	3:54
3.	"Tucker's Daughter"	Walker, Ian Moss	4:40
4.	"Love Will Carry Us Along"	Phil Small	4:24
5.	"Never Before"	Moss	6:03
6.	"Green River"	John Fogerty	5:02
7.	"Two Seconds Too Long"	Ian Rilen	2:48
8.	"Angel Eyes"	Matt Dennis, Earl Brent	3:50
9.	"The Party's Over"	Walker	4:53
10.	"All Alone on a Rock"	Walker	3:18
11.	"Bow River"	Moss	7:14
12.	"Catfish Blues"	Robert Petway	4:36
13.	"My Baby"	Phil Small	3:53
14.	"Purple Haze"	Jimi Hendrix	3:29
15.	"Message from Baghdad"	Ian Moss, Peter Moss	3:20
16.	"Songs for Julian"	Moss	0:53

=== 2015 re-release ===
CD 1

1. "Telephone Booth"
2. "Saturday Night"
3. "Tucker's Daughter"
4. "Love Will Carry Us Along"
5. "Jealous Guy"
6. "Never Before"
7. "Shape I'm In"
8. "Green River"
9. "Two Seconds Too Long"
10. "Piccolo Bar"
11. "Angel Eyes"

CD 2

1. "Tempted"
2. "The Party's Over"
3. "All Alone on a Rock"
4. "Bow River"
5. "Catfish Blues"
6. "My Baby"
7. "Such a Beautiful Thing"
8. "Purple Haze"
9. "Message from Baghdad"
10. "Song for Julian"

== Charts ==
Chart performance for Six Strings
Chart (2005–2006)	Peak position
Australian Albums (ARIA)	132

== Certifications ==
Region	Certification	Certified units/sales
Australia (ARIA)	Gold	35,000^{^}
^{^} Shipments figures based on certification alone.

== Personnel ==
- Ian Moss - Vocals, Guitar
