= Phone Booth (disambiguation) =

A phone booth or telephone booth is a small structure furnished with a payphone and designed for a telephone user's convenience.

Phone Booth may also refer to:

- Phone Booth (film), a 2002 American psychological thriller
- "Phone Booth", a song by Teairra Marí from the 2005 album Roc-A-Fella Records Presents Teairra Marí

== See also ==
- Phone Bhoot, a 2022 Indian horror comedy film
- "Telephone Booth" (song), by Ian Moss, 1989
