= Ruby (Catfish album) =

Studio album by Catfish
- Released: 1991
- Recorded: 1990–91
- Studio: Trafalgar Studios
- Genre: Rock
- Labels: WEA Records; Salt Records (reissue)
- Producers: Peter Walker, Don Walker

re-release cover

Ruby was the second album by Australian band Catfish. Released in 1991, it spent one week in the Australian charts, peaking at number 98. The first single from the album, "Johnny's Gone", peaked at number 129 and stayed in the Australian top 150 for 8 weeks.

== Background ==
Don Walker had been the main songwriter and piano player with Australian rock band Cold Chisel. He was the author of many of their hit songs, but had a lower profile than some other members of the band. When they split in 1983, Walker travelled extensively through the Soviet Union, Asia and Europe. He intended to retire from the music industry. In 1988 he released his first solo album under the name Catfish. It received some critical acclaim but only reached number 50 on the Australian charts.

== Recording ==
Walker later said, "The two Catfish albums were produced by Peter Walker and even though I was feeling my way as a singer, he managed to get good performances onto those albums. And it also took me those two Catfish albums to try and figure out what I should be doing, as far as what kind of songs suit the tales that I have to tell." Elsewhere, he said, "In the Catfish albums there are things that make me cringe and there are things that I think are really good. I think the song writing is very good. I think my skills were developed. The limitations on those album have to do with me trying to expand my competency."

== Songs ==
After the subject matter of Unlimited Address reflected Walker's overseas travels, Ruby was a return to an Australian setting. Walker said, "I tried to make it a little more light-hearted and less personal. For instance, there's one song which is about a transvestite who picks up a US sailor and cuts him up with a straight razor and there's another which is about three young blokes from a country town who go to a Bachelors and Spinsters Ball, pick up a girl and murder her.

"The Year That He Was Cool" was inspired by a man Walker knew in Grafton. When he was younger, he had been a very popular surfer. "Back then I wasn't so much uncool as invisible," Walker recalled. Meeting later in life, the man reminded Walker of how unpopular he had been. Walker said, "He was right, but he said it nasty, to remind that back in the day I couldn't catch a ball, couldn't catch a wave, couldn't catch anything." The song ends with the character drunkenly vomiting outside the local bowling club. No one recalls or wants to know about the year that he was cool.

"Charleville" was written after a night as the only resident at School of Art Hotel in town. It was covered by Slim Dusty on his album Ringer from the Top End and soon after recorded again as a duet with Walker. It later appeared on The Very Best of Slim Dusty, which stayed in the Australian country charts for over 15 years.

== Reception ==
The Canberra Times said, "With Ruby, Walker has been able to continue his impressions of contemporary Australia, without losing the blues-based rock n roll energy, perhaps a little like Chisel would have been if they'd survived into the '90s." The Sydney Morning Herald called it, "a more flowing, rootsy and colourfully textured record, with a vocal strength not evident on the debut album".The Age said, "Conjuring up a bleak Australia populated by winos, prostitutes and others, and informed by a sense of violence and alienation, Ruby is a strong album, surely among the most impressive released locally this year. ".

Clinton Walker said, "Catfish boasts a rumbustiously appealing, rootsy sound, it allows Walker to explore possibilities denied in rock, like extended narratives, as he does in songs on Ruby like the title-track. Then there's cuts on the album like "El Alamein Blues" (based around the fountain in Kings Cross), the laugh-in-your-beer country lament "Charleville" and "Johnny's Gone", which may be nothing more than an excuse for a rockabilly rave-up."

Reviewing the re-release, Inpress said, "there's more country, blues, and rockabilly. The romping opener "Johnny's Gone" would be at home on an episode of True Blood. While it doesn't have the absolute command of its predecessor, it's a worthy entry in the cannon."

== Re-release ==
In 2010, the album was re-released with new cover artwork from the original. The album was remastered by Don Bartley, and the songs "Johnny's Gone" and "See You Again" were remixed by Phil Punch. "Crooked Smile", a song about domestic violence, was partially re-recorded to be noticeably less poppy. Walker said his previous record label had lost the masters for the album but, "fortunately I have the raw material in the form of original tapes - I have them very, very well stored and looked after - so I could go back to the first principles and put them together. Once I knew I had to do that I enjoyed it a lot. I redid some thing and had some fun with it."

== Track listing ==
All songs written and composed by Don Walker

| No. | Title | Length |
|---|---|---|
| 1. | "Johnny's Gone" | 2:48 |
| 2. | "Ruby" | 3:29 |
| 3. | "Jericho Road" | 4:35 |
| 4. | "Too Long" | 4:47 |
| 5. | "Crooked Smile" | 4:28 |
| 6. | "Charleville" | 3:17 |
| 7. | "El Alamein Blues" | 4:24 |
| 8. | "The Year That He Was Cool" | 5:48 |
| 9. | "See You Again" | 4:25 |

== Personnel ==
- Don Walker – lead vocals, keyboards, bass (7)
- Ian Moss – lead guitar (3), rhythm guitar (4), guitar (8), backing vocals (2–3, 6)
- Charlie Owen – lead guitar (1–2, 6)
- Tony Cook – drums (1–4, 6–9)
- Ronald Laster – rhythm guitar (1–4, 6–9)
- David Blight – harmonica
- Paul Robert Burton – bass (1–6, 8–9)
- Peter Walker – guitar (5, 7–8), lead guitar (1, 3–4)
- Sunil De Silva – percussion (2, 4–8)
- Graham Bidstrup – drums (5)
