= Ian Moss (album) =

Studio album by Ian Moss
- Released: 2 March 2018
- Recorded: 2017
- Genre: Rock
- Label: Bloodlines Records
- Producer: Peter Walker

Ian Moss chronology
Soul on West 53rd (2009)	Ian Moss (2018)	Rivers Run Dry (2023)

Singles from Ian Moss
- 1. "Broadway" Released: 2017; 2. "If Another Day (Love Rewards Its Own)" Released: 9 February 2018; 3. "Hold On (To What We Got)" Released: October 2018

Ian Moss is the seventh studio album by Australian musician Ian Moss. The album was announced in November 2017 alongside a national tour commencing in June 2018. and is Moss's first solo album in nine years and his first of all original material in 22 years. The album was produced by Peter Walker, who also produced Cold Chisel's self-titled debut in 1978.

The album was released in March 2018 and peaked at number 11 on the ARIA Charts, becoming Moss's second highest charting solo album in his career.

== Recording ==
Moss said, "I started doing some recording in Nashville, but discovered that you could have your great, raw material songs, but then after that, the arrangement can really make or break things. And that's where I thought Peter Walker really came into his own. Peter produced the first Cold Chisel album all those years ago. He has got a fantastic ear for arrangement.

== Reception ==
Stack Magazine said "This is his finest solo album" singling out "Broadway" as an instant classic and other highlights "Down Along the Track" and "If Another Day". Simon Collins from The West Australian said ".. his soulful voice and supple fret-work across 11 classic rock songs imbued with snatches of soul, blues and country." calling the album "Top shelf".

== Track listing ==
CD/ DD version
No.	Title	Writer(s)	Length
1.	"If Another Day (Love Rewards Its Own)"	I. Moss, K. Jacobson, J. Farrell, P. Walker	3:38
2.	"A Girl Like You"	I. Moss, S. Hawksley, S. Wariner	3:24
3.	"Broadway"	I. Moss, A. Bonagura, S. Hawksley	5:08
4.	"Fist Full Of Money"	I. Moss, S. Hawksley, T. Meadows	4:43
5.	"Baby You’re Just Too Much"	I. Moss, S. Hawksley, P. Walker	4:14
6.	"Cold In The Night"	I. Moss, S. Hawksley, K. Bergsnes	4:22
7.	"Down Along The Track"	I. Moss, K. Bennett, P. Walker	4:28
8.	"I'm Not Your Only Man"	I. Moss, S. Hawksley	4:16
9.	"Pictures In The Sand"	I. Moss, S. Hawksley, K. Richey	4:02
10.	"Hold On (To What We Got)"	G. Nicholson, I. Moss, S. Hawksley	4:54
11.	"My Suffering"	S. Prestwich	3:37
12.	"I Don’t Know"	I. Moss, A. Roy-Scott, J. Zion	4:05
13.	"It’s Not Over"	I. Moss, P. Walker	3:47
14.	"If Another Day (Love Rewards Its Own) [Extended Version]"	I. Moss, K. Jacobson, J. Farrell, P. Walker	5:07

== Charts ==
Chart (2018)	Peak position
Australian Albums (ARIA)	11

== Release history ==
Region	Date	Format	Edition(s)	Label	Catalogue
Australia	2 March 2018	digital download; streaming	Standard	BloodLine	
Australia	9 March 2018	CD	Standard	BloodLine	BLOOD10
Australia	9 March 2018	Vinyl record	Limited Edition Green Vinyl	BloodLine	BLOODLP10
