= Worlds Away (Ian Moss album) =

Studio album by Ian Moss
- Released: 27 October 1991
- Recorded: 1991
- Genre: Rock, pop rock, blues rock
- Label: Mushroom
- Producer: Peter Walker; Ian Moss

Ian Moss chronology
Matchbook (1989)	Worlds Away (1991)	Petrolhead (1996)

Singles from Worlds Away
- 1. "Slip Away" Released: July 1991; 2. "She's a Star" Released: September 1991; 3. "Never Give Up" Released: January 1992

Worlds Away is the second studio album by Australian singer Ian Moss, a former member of Cold Chisel. Like its predecessor, the album featured several songs written for him by Don Walker, also from Cold Chisel. The album was released in October 1991 and peaked in the top 50 in Australia and New Zealand.

== Track listing ==
TVD93350
No.	Title	Writer(s)	Length
1.	"She's a Star"	Don Walker	4:09
2.	"Healing Hands"	Walker, Ian Moss	4:19
3.	"Money"	Walker, Moss	4:25
4.	"Only Love"	Steve Prestwich	5:50
5.	"Never Give Up"	Walker, Moss	4:08
6.	"Cards Will Fall"	Moss, Huey Benjamin	4:17
7.	"Slip Away"	Walker, Moss	4:04
8.	"No Amount Of Crying"	Moss, Sally Tiven, Jon Tiven	3:59
9.	"Worlds Away"	Moss, Eris O'Brien	5:50
10.	"Bow River"	Moss	5:33
11.	"You Know Who You Are Tonight"	Moss	5:12

== Charts ==
Chart (1991)	Peak position
Australian Albums (ARIA)	42
New Zealand Albums (RMNZ)	50
