= Lightning in a Clear Blue Sky =

Studio album by Don Walker
- Released: 5 May 2023
- Recorded: 2022
- Label: Salt Records

Don Walker chronology
Songs: Live at Camelot Lounge 2018 (2018)	Lightning in a Clear Blue Sky (2023)	Love Songs (2026)

Lightning in a Clear Blue Sky is the fourth album by Australian musician Don Walker, released in 2023. It debuted at number 2 on the Australian Independent charts.

== Background ==
Don Walker had been the main songwriter and keyboardist with successful Australian rock band Cold Chisel. When they split in 1983, Walker had intended to retire from the music industry. In 1988, he released his first of two albums under the name Catfish. In 1995, he released the first album under his own name. As well as his occasional solo records, he recorded with a reformed Cold Chisel and as a member of Tex, Don and Charlie.

== Recording ==
Guitarist Glen Hannah, a member of Walker's backing band, the Suave Fucks, died in 2019. Other guitarist, Roy Payne, took on a larger role. Walker said, "We pretty much rebuilt our little band around Roy. So the album was all based around the way that Roy plays guitar."

Recording was mostly done over two sessions in early 2022. Walker said, "It was just me and the band in a little room somewhere, just glad to be out of Covid and getting to see each other. Hamish and Michael have been on board for about 15 years; Gareth Costigan, I have been working with for around 30 years or more; and Roy Payne for about 20 years."

Amanda Roff, Erica Dunn and Brigitte Hart from the band Harmony performed as backing singers. Walker said, "I had been a fan of the Melbourne band, Tom Lyngcoln's Harmony, and their setup is a three piece punk band with three angelic singers – The Harmonettes – so I contacted them about working on the title song and then I thought to use them on shorter and easier songs." Walker described them as unlike traditional soul backing singers, being more "European" and "cold".

The eleven-minute title track was recorded in one take except for the trumpet section. Walker said months later he had a "typical middle-of-the-night idea: Wouldn't it be good to have mariachi trumpets on it? We tracked down Edgar Sanchez in Mexico City. He's not a jazz trumpeter moonlighting."

Payne died in July 2022, after the recording of the album. Walker said, "He had an innocent cut in one leg, then he felt sick, went to hospital and he was gone in two days." Shannon Bourne filled Payne's role on the following tour. Walker said of Payne, "Clearly he was a very close friend, not only of the existing band, but he was a good friend of Shannon Bourne. He was an amazing man, one of the most remarkable people I ever spent time with"

== Songs ==
Don Walker with brother Richard and the Harmonettes, after the album release.

Although many of the songs written in the three years before the album's release, at least two were "decades" old. "Damaged People" had been released by Jeff Lang in 2005. Walker's version was recorded as a demo, solo on piano, straight to DAT.

In "Tommy Hanlon's Motorhome", Hanlon is described as being "mythical character, maybe even immortal". Walker explained, "Tommy was American from a vaudeville family, so he was much sleeker and better looking than the Aussie TV stars of the time. Then at the height of it all he threw it in and bought a circus. Now that was intriguing. I'm sure there's some descendants of Tommy's out there who, if they hear this song, are gunna think it doesn't sound a lot like grandpa."

"Jungle Pam" was a rare co-write with the rest of the band. Walker said he was inspired by the story of "Jungle" Pamela Hardy, a sidekick to drag racer Jim Liberman in the 70s. Again, the lyrics diverged from the real character. He said, "Suddenly, from a standing start, Roy Payne chopped out this monstrous rhythm guitar figure, and Hamish Stuart and Michael Vidale fell on it. I thought, 'I've got the lyrics for that' and started singing. Garrett Costigan was sitting outside having a cigarette at the time, but he brought good things to it later."

On "When I Win the Lottery", Walker explained, "Most of the song is about taking your winnings and running amok, basically coursing across the landscape with your hair on fire, fighting off supermodels. That's not what I would do, because for a long time now I could probably do that anyway – the supermodels excepted."

"You've Got to Move" was recorded by Cold Chisel and released a year later as the sole single from their 50 Years – The Best Of compilation. Walker later said, "I was trying to write something like "Love Shack". In Cold Chisel now, we have Charley Drayton, who was the drummer on "Love Shack". It's just an impossible-to-resist groove. I said to Charley, 'I just wanna do "Love Shack".' Charley said, 'Oh. That's my favourite thing to do.'"

== Reception ==
Rhythms Magazine wrote, "A solo effort as deep as the ocean and as dark as the night, with big bright flashes of musical lightning. It's wondrous and tragic. It's melancholic. It's reflective. It's dirty and bluesy and blue. Honest as a bee sting." Trent Dalton said, "Here is the sound of a songwriter's soul. An old-ish one. A used and worn and raggedy one. But a beautiful one. Here is the sound of running and landing and crashing and dying of thirst and being born again through love and lightning."

The Australian said, "Walker's new-found vocal swagger permeates the record, whether in customary storytelling mode or stretching out across the 11-minute, nine-verse title track, a wide-screen, largely spoken-word epic tale of retribution with distant mariachi horns. Jeff Jenkins said, "These are dance songs for the damaged and the damned. This is Walker's solo masterpiece, work of dark beauty where in the end, 'You think you've got a future, you think you've got a soul/ You're just a piece of meat, tryin' to dig a hole'."

== Track listing ==
All songs written and composed by Don Walker, except "Jungle Pam" by Walker/Payne/Stuart/Vidale/Costigan

No.	Title	Length
1.	"Empty Dance-Hall"	3:02
2.	"Jungle Pam"	4:30
3.	"When I Win the Lottery"	4:01
4.	"My Maleva"	3:34
5.	"Tommy Hanlon's Motor Home"	3:54
6.	"Lightning in a Clear Blue Sky"	11:32
7.	"You've Got to Move"	4:06
8.	"Damaged People"	3:23

== Personnel ==
- Don Walker – lead vocals, keyboards
- Roydon Payne - guitar
- Garrett Costigan – pedal steel
- Hamish Stuart - drums
- Michael Vidale - bass
- Amanda Roff - backing vocals
- Erica Dunn - backing vocals
- Brigitte Hart - backing vocals
- Mark Punch - extra guitar on "You've Got to Move"
- Edgar Sanchez - trumpet on "Lightning in a Clear Blue Sky"
