= Out of the Fire (song) =

1989 song by Ian Moss

Single by Ian Moss

from the album Matchbook
- B-side: "Angel Eyes"
- Released: September 1989
- Studio: Rhinoceros Studios, Sydney
- Genre: Rock, pop rock
- Length: 4:27
- Label: Mushroom
- Songwriter(s): Ian Moss; Don Walker
- Producer(s): Chris Lord-Alge; Ian Moss

Ian Moss singles chronology
| "Telephone Booth" (1989) | "Out of the Fire" (1989) | "Mr Rain" (1989) |

"Out of the Fire" is a song written by Australians Don Walker and Ian Moss and recorded by Moss, released in September 1989 as the third single from his debut studio album, Matchbook (1989).

Moss said of the writing process, "I'd been working on it all night, and I knew I needed to stop after I saw the sun coming up. When Don came in he was able to give it a really strong twist - especially in the lyrics and the middle eight. He came to the rescue! That's the way we've always worked - if you have something that inspires you, a thread to pull upon, Don will be the one to really get the best out of it."

== Track listing ==
7" Single (K937)

- Side A "Out of the Fire" - 4:27
- Side B "Angel Eyes" - 5:13

== Charts ==
| Chart (1989) | Peak position |
|---|---|
| Australia (ARIA) | 29 |
