= Let's All Get Together =

Studio album by Ian Moss
- Released: July 2007
- Genre: Pop rock
- Length: 68:55
- Label: Liberation Music

Ian Moss chronology
Six Strings (2005)	Let's All Get Together (2007)	Soul on West 53rd (2009)

Singles from Let's All Get Together
- 1. "Let's All Get Together" Released: 2007; 2. "Happy Days" Released: 2007

Let's All Get Together is the fifth studio album by Australian musician Ian Moss. The album was released in July 2007 and is Moss' second acoustic album following Six Strings in 2005.

== Reception ==
Brett Winterford from The Sydney Morning Herald wrote that "the album finds Moss in fine voice - better than in his Cold Chisel days", adding "but the album does lack some of the magic he is nostalgic for -something that only sparked when Cold Chisel's five sometimes-volatile characters were in the same room."

JB Hi-Fi said "Never has there been a more intriguing and satisfying fusion of rock, soul, jazz and blues and it's all delivered in Mossy’s trademark laid-back style."

== Track listing ==
Let's All Get Together track listing (BLUE148.2)
No.	Title	Writer(s)	Length
1.	"Let's All Get Together" (featuring Margaret Urlich)	Don Walker	5:38
2.	"Choir Girl"	Walker	3:57
3.	"Happy Day" (featuring Margaret Urlich)	Walker, Nathan Cavaleri	4:44
4.	"Such a Beautiful Thing"	Walker	3:59
5.	"The Girl I Once Knew"	Small	4:20
6.	"Red Sand"	Ian Moss, P. Moss, C. Curtis	4:18
7.	"Blame It on the Sun"	Stevie Wonder, Syreeta Wright	3:14
8.	"Flame Trees"	Steve Prestwich, Walker	6:59
9.	"Janelle" (with James Morrison)	Walker	3:20
10.	"That's The Way It Is"	Walker, T. Salter	3:23
11.	"Out of the Fire"	I. Moss, Walker	5:18
12.	"Mr. Rain"	I. Moss, Sally Tiven, Jon Tiven	5:17
13.	"When the War Is Over"	Prestwich	5:41
14.	"Thunderball"	J. Barry, D. Black	3:22
15.	"Georgia on My Mind"	Hoagy Carmichael, Stuart Gorrell	5:38

== Personnel ==
- Ian Moss – vocals, guitar

== Charts ==
Chart performance for Let's All Get Together
Chart (2007)	Peak position
Australian Albums (ARIA)	49
