= Robb College =

Robb College within the University of New England
- University of New England
- Location: Armidale, New South Wales, Australia
- Coordinates: 30.4867°S 151.6430°E
- Motto: Fellowship in Learning
- Established: 1960
- Head: Archie Cudmore
- Residents: 206
- Website: robbcollege.com

Robb College is a residential college located within the University of New England in Armidale, NSW Australia. It provides alternative living arrangements to over 200 male and female students that come from different areas all over Australia. Students residing at Robb college, are colloqusalised as 'Robbers'. Apart from accommodation, residents eat meals with each other and there is a high level of social, academic and sporting culture that exists within the college which differentiates it from conventional living arrangements. Residents of the college study a diverse range of disciplines, particularly agricultures, law, business, education and nursing.

== History ==
Robb College, University of New England was founded in 1960, named after the first Registrar of the University of New England, William Menzies Robb. The college was originally established as a men's college, then in 1977 female students were accepted. The college is non-denominational. The architecture of the college is modernist, following the design of a traditionalist Oxford College quadrangle model. At the time of its founding, it was designed to house 206 male students and seven fellows.

=== Aims of the College ===
Robb College plays a significant role in the development of young adults throughout their college experience by offering both pastoral care and independence associated with adulthood. The college fosters the intellectual, social and personal growth of its residents, to encourage community spirit and scholarship through active participation, the expression of ideas, and the upholding of traditions that represent the history and enhance the integrity of Robb College

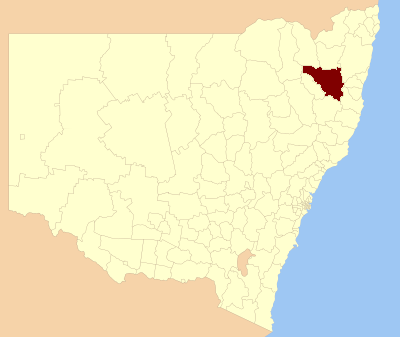
Robb College Location

== Culture ==
=== Academics ===
The college fosters the academic growth and development of its students by placing strong emphasis on academic excellence to new coming 'fresher' students as well as returning men and women of the college. The 'Epigram-Whalley Academic Shield' is a competitive shield, that is award to the colleges annual academic dinner to the student who achieved the best academic results in the previous year. This competition is carried out with not only residents of Robb College but residents of St Albert's College, which is another residential college within the University of New England.

=== Sport ===
The college is renowned for its commitment in a variety of sports. The college plays in weekly sporting competitions with both other residential colleges within the University of New England and broader rugby clubs in the area. Some sports that the college offers are; rugby, netball, hockey, women's touch 7s, basketball, soccer, mixed netball, and water polo. The colleges first year students, known as 'Fresher's' compete in competitive matches through the year with St Albert's College Fresher's. The Mary Bagnall Trophy (Women's competition), and the President's Trophy (Male Competition) are weekly, inter-collegiate competitions held throughout the year between various colleges within the University of New England. Points are accumulated for the winners of each game and at the end of the year, the college with the most points win the respective competition.

=== Charity ===
Each year Robb College chooses a charity for which the college supports throughout the duration of the academic year. Charities are usually ones that have affected students, meaning that there is usually much support for the chosen charity. In 2017, the college raised $50,000 in support of the Burrumbuttock Hay Runners, to help farmers struggling in the hardships of drought.

== Robb Foundation ==
The Robb Foundation was founded in 1987 and exists to support students wanting to complete their degrees and attend Robb College at the University of New England. The do this by raising funds for scholarships for prospective students, boost career opportunities through linkages with Robb College alumni, and coordinate leadership coaching and management skills for college scholars and students.

== Leadership ==
The college is run by a team of professional and student leadership team. The Head of college is Greg Mills. Leadership is made out of both the Senior and Junior Common Room. The Senior Common Room are older members of the college often encompassing a more pastoral care role, as well as academic tutorial role. The Junior Common Room is made up of undergraduate students in their first, second and third years and has a team of older undergraduate student leaders that govern the student life of the college.

== Architecture controversy ==
Since 2014, controversy has arisen regarding the demolition of sectors of building in Robb College for the reconstruction of a more contemporary college that has been said to better suit the needs of residential students in the 21st century. One of the building's has been empty since 2014, when students were relocated to other university colleges. The University of New England held plans to refurbish the college while the Heritage Council of New South Wales decided or not to declare the building as part of the heritage list. In December 2017, the decision was made that it would not be declared on the heritage listing as part of reasons made by the university that the building had failed across a variety of repair, safety and hazardous issues.

Such plans to redevelop have been met with criticism, especially those who are interested in the architectural heritage of the college. The value of Robb College's architectural heritage stems from a number of buildings that include the dining hall, residential courtyards, basalt stones that were used in the construction of the original buildings and much more. Yet, the university claims that the cheap building materials that were originally used in the construction of the college during the 1960s have been subject to decades of decay and expanding accommodation requirements of new prospective students have left the university and the college itself no choice but to proceed with plans to renew and develop the college. Robb College has spent decades reviewing and assessing the colleges future, establishing a balance between the future economics of the college whilst simultaneously trying to hold onto its past heritage. Petitions have been established to try and protect the college from the developments, stating that the buildings should be protected under the NSW Heritage Council.
