= Petrolhead =

Studio album by Ian Moss
- Released: August 1996
- Recorded: 1995–1996
- Studio: Festival Studios, Megaphon Studios
- Genre: Hard rock, blues
- Length: 46:35
- Label: TWA Records
- Producer: Don Walker

Ian Moss chronology
Worlds Away (1991)	Petrolhead (1996)	Ian Moss Live (1997)

Singles from Petrolhead
- 1. "Poor Boy" Released: October 1996; 2. "All Alone On a Rock" Released: February 1997

Petrolhead is the third studio album by Australian musician Ian Moss. The album was a departure from Ian's previous albums with Moss saying “it was a conscious decision to get back to something I was always happy doing. The result is tough, ballsy blues meets rock...plenty of heart, alive and kicking.”

== Reception ==
Australian musicologist Ian McFarlane declared it was "his best-ever album ... [by] a down'n'dirty blues-rock outfit ... with gritty, hard-edged tracks ... [and] finely honed guitar work".

The Sydney Morning Herald said, "The irony of Petrolhead is while many of the songs seem forgettable on first listen, they are annoyingly difficult to forget. Just about everything is unoriginal, but is also done with enthusiasm and guitars turned up to 11."

== Track listing ==
TWAD107
No.	Title	Writer(s)	Length
1.	"Petrolhead"	Don Walker	5:33
2.	"Two Seconds Too Long"	Walker, Ian Rilen	2:24
3.	"The Whole Way Down"	Spencer Jones	4:35
4.	"It Ain't Easy"	Rilen	3:54
5.	"Poor Boy"	Walker, Andy Heggen	3:47
6.	"Heaven"	Walker	5:50
7.	"Made Her Mine"	Walker	4:02
8.	"Albino Faye"	Jones	3:58
9.	"Mother Mercy"	Heggen	4:13
10.	"80 MPH Blues"	Rilen	4:06
11.	"All Alone On a Rock"	Walker	3:48

== Personnel ==
- Ian Moss - Vocals, Guitar
- Ian Rilen - Bass
- Paul DeMarco - Drums
- Don Walker - Keyboards, Producer
- Trent Williamson - Harmonica
- Shauna Jensen - Backing Vocals
- Maggie McKinney - Backing Vocals
- Jerome Smith - Backing Vocals

== Charts ==
Chart performance for Petrolhead
Chart (1996)	Peak position
Australian Albums (ARIA)	101
