= Rivers Run Dry =

Studio album by Ian Moss
- Released: 21 July 2023
- Studio: Rancom Street Studios, Sydney
- Label: Mosstrooper, UMA
- Producer: Ian Moss, Brent Clark

Ian Moss chronology
Live (2020)	Rivers Run Dry (2023)

Singles from Rivers Run Dry
- 1. "Rivers Run Dry" Released: 28 April 2023; 2. "Nullarbor Plain" Released: 26 May 2023; 3. "Open Your Eyes" Released: 16 February 2024

Rivers Run Dry is the eighth studio album by Australian musician Ian Moss. The album was announced in April 2023 alongside the title track and lead single.

Upon announcement, Moss said "The song selection for Rivers Run Dry was focused on simply finding good songs, regardless of the style or genre they may have initially presented, and the result is an album that covers straight-ahead rock, latin, funk, country, blues & unapologetic pop and yet we still ended up with an album that sounds very cohesive."

The album was released on 21 July 2023 and peaked at number 18 on the ARIA Charts.

The album was supported by the Rivers Run Dry Australian tour commencing in August 2023.

A deluxe edition is scheduled for release in January 2024, with 6 live tracks, recording during the Rivers Run Dry Australian tour.

== Recording ==
The album was recorded over ten days at Rancom Street studios in Sydney, with additional recording at Oceanic Studios & Point Blank Studios. Moss said some of the songs on the album are old, commencing work on "The Last Time" and "Don't Know" as early as 1992.

== Reception ==
Australian Arts Review said "the album once more displays Mossy's well-documented guitar-playing genius and a voice that floats like a butterfly and yet can pack the punch of a Mallee bull."

== Track listing ==
Rivers Run Dry (MOSSY001) (MOSSY002)
No.	Title	Writer(s)	Length
1.	"Rivers Run Dry"	Ian Moss; Lucy DeSoto; Josh Paul; Margeaux Rolleston	4:49
2.	"Nullarbor Plain"	Moss; Troy Cassar-Daley	3:30
3.	"State of My Emotion"	Moss; DeSoto; Kerry Jacobson	3:47
4.	"Bury Me"	Moss; Jay O'Shea; Mark O'Shea	4:14
5.	"Open Your Eyes"	Moss; Lily Lizotte	3:43
6.	"I Miss You in the Night"	Don Walker	3:50
7.	"Hold On (The Sun Will Rise Again)"	Moss; Sam Hawksley	6:22
8.	"The Wish"	Jacobson	3:46
9.	"What Can I Do"	Moss; Walker	5:18
10.	"The Last Time"	Moss; Alan Roy Scott	4:07
11.	"I’m Going Back"	Moss; Cassar-Daley	5:30
12.	"Blame It On the Sun"	Stevie Wonder; Syreeta Wright	3:22

Rivers Run Dry Bonus Disc
No.	Title	Length
1.	"Rivers Run Dry" (live)
2.	"I Miss You in the Night" (live)
3.	"Open Your Eyes" (live)
4.	"The Wish" (live)
5.	"Nullarbor Plain" (live)
6.	"Georgia On My Mind" (live)

== Charts ==
Chart performance for Rivers Run Dry
Chart (2023)	Peak position
Australian Albums (ARIA)	18
