= Soul on West 53rd =

Studio album by Ian Moss
- Released: 16 October 2009
- Studio: Avatar Studios, Megaphon Studios, Royaltone Studios
- Genre: funk, soul
- Label: Liberation Music
- Producer: Danny Kortchmar; George Gorga; Ian Moss

Ian Moss chronology
Let's all Get Together (2007)	Soul on West 53rd (2009)	Ian Moss (2018)

Singles from Soul on West 53rd
- 1. "Shake/Let's Stay Together" Released: August 2009

Soul on West 53rd is the sixth studio album by Australian singer Ian Moss. The album was released in October 2009 and peaked at number 40 on the ARIA Charts, becoming Moss's second top 40 album.

== Reception ==
Amazon said "Respected as one of Australia's iconic musicians, Ian Moss delivers an unforgettable sound - not only as a telling soloist on guitar but especially with his silken voice, ringing with clarity and resonating with pure soul. 'Mossy' is now allowing his guitar work to take a back seat while he concentrates on singing - which is the focus of his album that features fresh takes on classic soul songs from the likes of Sam Cooke, Al Green, Otis Redding and Levi Stubbs. When audiences hear the power and excitement on Soul on West 53rd, it will reinforce what Ian Moss has to offer as a vocalist of repute".

== Track listing ==
LMCD0052
No.	Title	Writer(s)	Length
1.	"Shake"	Sam Cooke	3:43
2.	"Work to Do"	O'Kelly Isley, Jr., Ronald Isley, Ernie Isley	3:43
3.	"(I've Got to Use My) Imagination"	Gerry Goffin, Barry Goldberg	5:09
4.	"Any Day Now"	Burt Bacharach, Bob Hilliard	4:08
5.	"(Ain't That) Good News"	Cooke	3:43
6.	"Stop On By"	Bobby Womack, T Thomas	3:47
7.	"Good Times"	Cooke	3:35
8.	"Hummingbird"	Leon Russell	5:06
9.	"Standing in the Shadows of Love"	Holland–Dozier–Holland	3:23
10.	"Use Me"	Bill Withers	4:42
11.	"I Wrote a Simple Song"	Billy Preston, Joe Greene	4:38
12.	"Let's Stay Together"	Al Green; Willie Mitchell; Al Jackson, Jr.	4:29
13.	"What Becomes of the Brokenhearted" (featuring Jimmy Barnes and Joan Osborne)	William Weatherspoon, Paul Riser, James Dean	3:25

== Charts ==
Chart (2009)	Peak position
Australian Albums (ARIA)	40

== Release history ==
Region	Date	Format	Edition(s)	Label	Catalogue
Australia	16 October 2009	CD; digital download	Standard	Liberation Music	LMCD0052
