= Matchbook (Ian Moss album) =

Studio album by Ian Moss
- Released: 1 August 1989
- Recorded: September 1988 – January 1989
- Studios: Rhinoceros Studios, Sydney and Oceanways Studios, Los Angeles
- Genres: Rock, pop rock, blues rock
- Length: 44:53
- Label: Mushroom
- Producers: Chris Lord-Alge, Ian Moss

Ian Moss chronology
Matchbook (1989)	Worlds Away (1991)

Singles from Matchbook
- 1. "Tucker's Daughter" Released: 7 November 1988; 2. "Telephone Booth" Released: 19 June 1989; 3. "Out of the Fire" Released: September 1989; 4. "Mr. Rain" Released: December 1989

Matchbook is the debut solo studio album by Australian singer-guitarist, Ian Moss, a member of pub rockers, Cold Chisel. Six of its ten tracks were written by fellow Cold Chisel bandmate, Don Walker, and three were co-written by Moss and Walker. The album was released in August 1989 and peaked at number 1 on the ARIA Albums Chart; it remained in the Top 10 for 14 weeks and shipped more than 200,000 copies. It also reached the Top 20 on the Official New Zealand Music Chart.

Moss described the album's sound to Beryl Cook of The Canberra Times, "it's definitely fairly R&B with a white soul edge to it, with a hint of rock and roll and plenty of big guitar over the top."

Matchbook provided four singles, "Tucker's Daughter" (November 1988, which reached No. 2 on the ARIA Singles Chart), "Telephone Booth" (June 1989, No. 7), "Out of the Fire" (September, No. 29) and "Mr. Rain" (December). "Tucker's Daughter" also peaked at No. 6 in New Zealand, where "Telephone Booth" got to No. 29.

At the ARIA Music Awards of 1990 the album was nominated for and won three categories: Album of the Year, Best Male Artist and Breakthrough Artist – Album for Moss. At the same ceremony, for "Tucker's Daughter", Moss won Breakthrough Artist – Single and Song of the Year (shared with Walker), as well as nominated for Single of the Year.

A limited edition white vinyl version of Matchbook was released on 1 June 2018.

A 30th Anniversary edition was released in August 2019.

== Reception ==
Australian musicologist, Ian McFarlane, found the album displayed Moss' "exemplary, controlled guitar technique, but also highlighted his soulful voice ... [he] handled all lead vocals with considerable style and authority". The Canberra Times' Penelope Layland opined, "It is faultless at what it does... The music on the album is mainly blues-influenced rock, although some tracks, such as the funky 'Mr Rain', break away from the mould."

== Track listing ==
D53307
No.	Title	Writer(s)	Length
1.	"Tucker's Daughter"	Don Walker, Ian Moss	4:35
2.	"Telephone Booth"	Walker	3:04
3.	"Out of the Fire"	Walker, Moss	4:58
4.	"Mr. Rain"	Moss, Sally Tiven, Jon Tiven	4:20
5.	"Matchbook"	Walker	4:33
6.	"Such a Beautiful Thing"	Walker	3:59
7.	"I've Got You"	Walker, Moss, Steve Prestwich	5:15
8.	"Pretty Face"	Walker	5:25
9.	"Tangletown"	Walker	4:17
10.	"I'll Remember You"	Walker	4:27

== Charts ==
=== Weekly charts ===
Chart (1989/90)	Peak position
Australian Albums (ARIA)	1
New Zealand Albums (RMNZ)	19

=== Year-end charts ===
Chart (1989)	Position
Australian Albums (ARIA)	22
Australian Artist Albums (ARIA)	6

== Certifications ==
Region	Certification	Certified units/sales
Australia (ARIA)	2× Platinum	140,000^{^}
^{^} Shipments figures based on certification alone.

== See also ==
- Number-one albums of 1989 (Australia)
