= Tucker's Daughter =

1988 single by Ian Moss

Single by Ian Moss

from the album Matchbook
- B-side: "Islands"
- Released: 7 November 1988
- Recorded: 1988
- Studio: Ocean Way Recording (Los Angeles)
- Genre: Rock
- Length: 4:36
- Label: Mushroom
- Songwriters: Ian Moss; Don Walker
- Producers: Chris Lord-Alge; Ian Moss

Ian Moss singles chronology
"Tucker's Daughter" (1988)	"Telephone Booth" (1989)

"Tucker's Daughter" is a song by Australian rock singer and guitarist Ian Moss. It was released as his debut solo single in November 1988, almost five years after his group, Cold Chisel, had disbanded for the first time. It was co-written by Moss and Don Walker (also from Cold Chisel). The song was the lead single from Moss' debut studio album, Matchbook (1989).

== Background and lyrics ==
The lyrics of "Tucker's Daughter" tell the story of a farm labourer who finds himself the attention of his employer's daughter, but he does not return her affections. Moss had initially written the music to the song less than a fortnight before recording on his debut album was about to commence. He said, "I was pretty confident I had a good hit here. I was literally running around the house going 'yahoo!', jumping up and clicking my heels."

Walker described in 2005 how Moss had sent him pieces of music including certain phrases that he wanted included in places within the song, "Ian sent "Tucker's Daughter" on a cassette [by] express airmail from Los Angeles where he was, and he had the melody but the only lyric he had was, 'Hey there, motherfucker.' Right through the rest of the song. I couldn't use that, but I recognized that it had a certain percussive force".

In September 2007, Moss told a reporter at The Herald Sun newspaper that he was dissatisfied with his entry at Wikipedia: "About 95 per cent of the stories I read say Don Walker wrote it, but I wrote it too. I wrote the music and the punch line. 'Build me up, tear me down'. I'm not sure how to edit Wikipedia, but I will get on to that and change it."

== Reception ==
At the ARIA Music Awards of 1990, "Tucker's Daughter" was nominated for three awards and won two: Breakthrough Artist – Single and Song of the Year. The song was also nominated for Single of the Year. In January 2018, as part of Triple M's "Ozzest 100", the 'most Australian' songs of all time, "Tucker's Daughter" was ranked number 99.

== Music video ==
The start of the video depicts Tucker's daughter, a young woman, played by actress Tasma Walton walking through a field. Several scenes feature Ian Moss singing and playing his guitar inside a barn. Although Moss does not react to the woman's affection in the lyrics; three black and white scenes during the video depict the two having a romantic encounter.

== Charts ==
=== Weekly charts ===
Chart (1989)	Peak position
Australia (ARIA)	2
New Zealand (Recorded Music NZ)	6

=== Year-end charts ===
Chart (1989)	Position
Australia (ARIA)	15

== Certifications ==
Region	Certification	Certified units/sales
Australia (ARIA)	Platinum	70,000^{^}
^{^} Shipments figures based on certification alone.
