= Telephone Booth (song) =

Single by Ian Moss

from the album Matchbook
- B-side: "Answermachine Blues"
- Released: 19 June 1989
- Studio: Rhinoceros Studios, Sydney
- Genre: Rock; Pop-rock
- Length: 3:04
- Label: Mushroom
- Songwriter(s): Don Walker
- Producer(s): Chris Lord-Alge; Ian Moss

Ian Moss singles chronology
"Tucker's Daughter" (1988)	"Telephone Booth" (1989)	"Out of the Fire" (1989)

"Telephone Booth" is a song written by Don Walker and recorded by Australian singer Ian Moss, released in June 1989 as the second single from his debut studio album, Matchbook (1989). It peaked at No. 7 on the ARIA Singles Chart.

== Background ==
Ian Moss was the founding mainstay guitarist, and some time singer, for Australian rock group, Cold Chisel, which he formed with Don Walker on keyboards in 1973. After Cold Chisel disbanded in 1984, Moss took a break from his music career, which he resumed in 1986. During 1988 Moss worked in Los Angeles for nine months preparing material for his debut album, Matchbook. In November 1988 he released his debut single, "Tucker's Daughter", which peaked at number two on the ARIA Singles Chart and number six on the New Zealand Singles Chart.

Moss' second single, "Telephone Booth", was issued in June 1989, which reached number seven on the ARIA Singles Chart, and top 30 in New Zealand. It was written by former bandmate, Walker. Kathryn Whitfield of The Canberra Times observed, "'Tucker's Daughter' was good, but this is great. Cool rock and roll which makes for good radio and great dancing. Loved it first time around. Has instant appeal and a catchy beat."

== Track listing ==
7" Single (K881)

- Side A "Telephone Booth" - 3:04
- Side B "Answermachine Blues" - 3:44

== Charts ==
=== Weekly charts ===
Chart (1989)	Peak position
Australia (ARIA)	7
New Zealand (Recorded Music NZ)	29

=== Year-end charts ===
Chart (1989)	Position
Australia (ARIA)	62
