= Ian Moss =

Australian blues rock musician (born 1955)

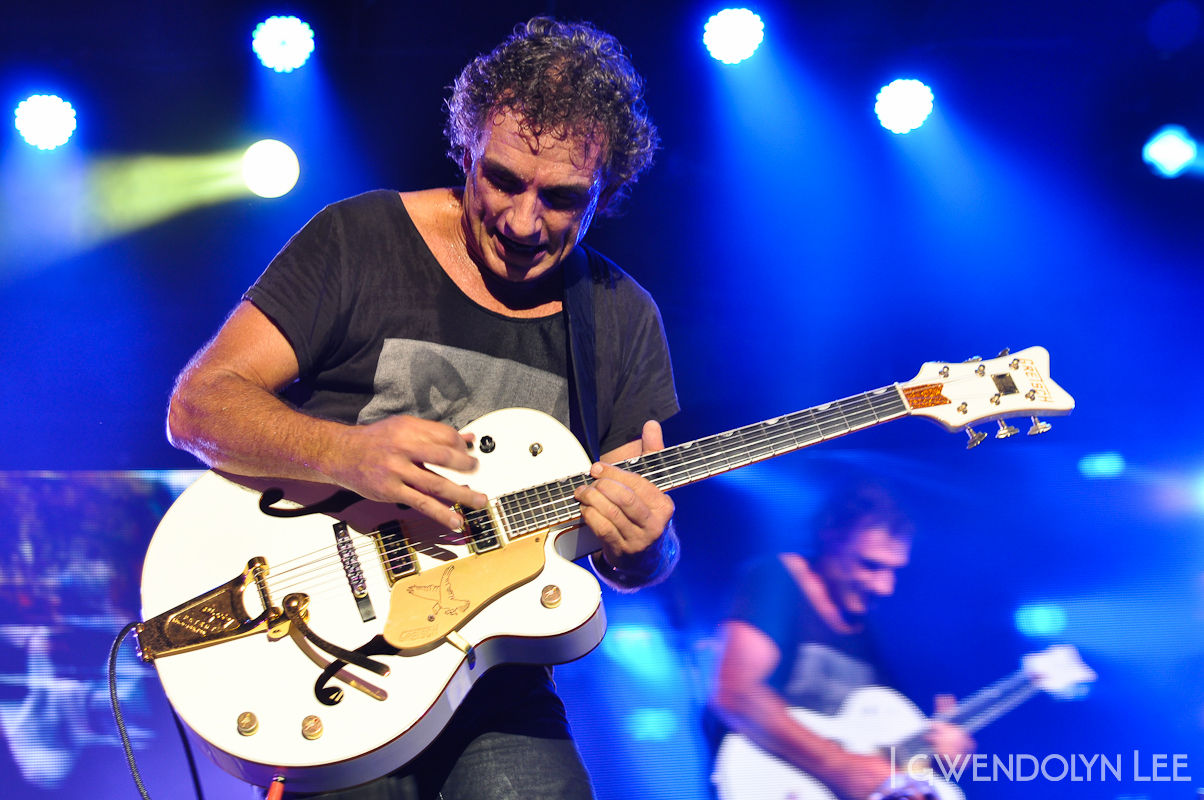
- Moss performing with Cold Chisel in 2012

Background information
- Born: Ian Richard Moss; 20 March 1955 (age 71); Alice Springs, Northern Territory, Australia
- Genres: Rock; blues
- Occupations: Musician; singer; songwriter; guitarist
- Instruments: Guitar; vocals
- Years active: 1969–present
- Labels: Liberation, Mushroom
- Member of: Cold Chisel
- Website: www.ianmoss.com.au

Ian Richard Moss (born 20 March 1955) is an Australian rock musician from Alice Springs. He is the founding mainstay guitarist and occasional singer of Cold Chisel. In that group's initial eleven year phase from 1973 to 1984, Moss was recorded on all five studio albums, three of which reached number one on the national Kent Music Report Albums Chart. In August 1989 he released his debut solo album, Matchbook, which peaked at number one on the ARIA Albums Chart. It was preceded by his debut single, "Tucker's Daughter", which reached number two on the related ARIA Singles Chart in March. The track was co-written by Moss with Don Walker, also from Cold Chisel. Moss had another top ten hit with "Telephone Booth" in June 1989.

At the ARIA Music Awards of 1990 Moss won five categories: Album of the Year, Best Male Artist, Breakthrough Artist – Album, Single of the Year and Breakthrough Artist – Single. Since then his solo music career has been more low-key, his other top 50 albums are Worlds Away (November 1991), Let's All Get Together (July 2007) and Soul on West 53rd (November 2009). In 1993 Cold Chisel, with Moss as a member, were inducted into the ARIA Hall of Fame. Moss has participated with periodic Cold Chisel reunion tours or new studio albums in 1998, 2003 and from 2009 to 2012 (as from August 2013).

== Early life ==
Ian Richard Moss was born on 20 March 1955 in Alice Springs, Northern Territory, to Geoffery Moss (18 April 1911 – 1989) and Lorna (née Robinson) (born ca. 1922). During World War II Geoffery survived the 1942 bombing of Darwin, he enlisted in the army and later worked for the Allied Works Council in Alice Springs. Lorna was a fellow employee at Allied Works Council when they married in September 1945.

Moss has an older brother, Peter Geoffrey Moss (born 8 October 1948), an older sister, Penny (born 30 July 1951), and a younger brother, Andrew (born July 13 1961). When Moss was four years old he performed for his family and friends and at nine, sang "The Battle of New Orleans" at a school concert. He later recalled "I was always keen on music and singing. I used to do little vocal concerts for my parents". Moss initially took piano lessons but switched to guitar at age 11: "My older sister was learning classical piano and my older brother was a good rhythm strummer and right into Bob Dylan. I started off with classical piano aged about 7 or 8, but unfortunately wasn't into it enough".

In 1969 he joined a local band, Seen, which included drummer Rod Martin and two brothers, Robert and John Fortunaso. Moss played rhythm guitar by plugging an acoustic guitar into the bass player's amplifier. Seen played at local centres and organised their own dances. Moss sang a couple of songs with the group and a year later, he bought an electric guitar to replace his acoustic. Moss recalled, "I was with them for about a year and by that time I was starting to get my own band happening".

The following year he formed Hot Ice with Roger Harris – guitar, David Michel – drums, Wayne Sanderson – Bass and Paul Wiles – keyboards. The group debuted in front of the whole school at the Alice Springs High School regular Friday assembly which took place in the Alice Springs Youth Centre with cover versions of Creedence Clearwater Revival's "Proud Mary" and "Who'll Stop the Rain". Thereafter they regularly played at the Youth Centre Saturday night dances. In 1972, Moss relocated to Adelaide – where his older siblings had already moved. Moss had failed a year of high school and decided to repeat at Marion High School. In 1973 he started an Electronics course at Kilkenny Technical College but "lasted one term there ... totally daydreaming the whole time", he left and worked in various factory jobs.

== Career ==
=== 1973–1984: Cold Chisel ===
In September 1973, Moss, on guitar and lead vocals, formed a rock group, Orange, in Adelaide with Don Walker, a songwriter and organist, and Leszek Kaczmarek on bass guitar. Within months the line-up included Steve Prestwich on drums and Jimmy Barnes on lead vocals, and they were renamed, Cold Chisel. The group's early line-up was volatile with Barnes, Prestwich and Walker all leaving and returning at various times. In 1975 Kaczmarek was replaced on bass guitar by Phil Small.

Moss's main role was as lead guitarist, although he would frequently take over lead vocals when Barnes was out of the band. After periods spent in Adelaide, Armidale and Melbourne, Cold Chisel eventually settled in Sydney in mid-1977 and signed a recording contract with WEA late that year. Early the following year they recorded their self-titled debut album, which appeared in April. Moss supplied lead vocals for two tracks, "One Long Day" and "Rosaline".

Moss on the Cold Chisel Last Stand Tour, 1983

Moss's vocals feature on some of the band's best known songs, including the singles "My Baby" (August 1980), "When the War Is Over" (1982), and "Saturday Night" (March 1984) and on Circus Animals (March 1982) album track, "Bow River". Moss wrote "Bow River" about a cattle station in the Kimberley region of Western Australia where his brother, Peter, had once worked; it has since become Moss's signature tune. It was also the B-side of "Forever Now", which was released in the same month as the album.

Moss sang lead on the group's version of "Georgia On My Mind" which became a staple of their live shows, appearing on the 1984 live album, Barking Spiders Live: 1983. Their fifth studio album, Twentieth Century, was issued in April 1984 with two tracks, "Saturday Night" and "Janelle", featuring Moss on lead vocals. However the group had disbanded as Barnes was keen to begin his solo career.

During Cold Chisel's first phase, Moss gained status as a songwriter, contributing "Never Before" for East (June 1980), the track was the first one aired by national radio station Triple J when it switched from AM to FM in 1980. Another Moss-written track is "No Good for You" on Circus Animals. He also worked as a session musician for other artists, including playing a guitar solo on the track "Skin" from the album Icehouse (October 1980) by Sydney rock band Flowers and an appearance on Richard Clapton's The Great Escape (March 1982), which also featured Barnes.

=== 1985–1997: Solo career success ===
After Cold Chisel disbanded, Ian Moss took a break from the music industry before launching his solo career in October 1986. His first backing band consisted of Andy Cowan on keyboards (ex-Madder Lake, Ayers Rock, Kevin Borich Express), Joe Imbroll on bass guitar (ex-Goanna) and John Watson on drums (ex-Kevin Borich Express, Australian Crawl). By April the following year the line-up was Watson, Joe Creighton on bass guitar (ex-Melissa, Billy T) and Peter Walker on guitar and synthesiser (ex-Bakery) – Walker had also produced Cold Chisel's debut album in 1978.

During 1988 Moss worked in Los Angeles for nine months preparing material for his debut album, Matchbook. In November 1988, Moss released his debut single, "Tucker's Daughter" which peaked at number two on the ARIA Singles Chart and number six on the New Zealand Singles Chart.

Moss's second single, "Telephone Booth", was issued in June-1989 and reached number seven on the ARIA Singles Chart, and top 30 in New Zealand. Matchbook, followed in August, which reached number one on the ARIA Albums Chart, it remained at the peak spot for three weeks and sold more than 200,000 copies. In New Zealand it reached the top 20 on the albums chart. Matchbook was produced by Moss and Lord-Alge; it was dedicated "in loving memory of Geoff Moss 1911–1989". Australian musicologist, Ian McFarlane, found the album displayed Moss's "exemplary, controlled guitar technique, but also highlighted his soulful voice ... [he] handled all lead vocals with considerable style and authority".

Two further singles, "Out of the Fire" and "Mr. Rain" were released from the album and both charted on the Australian top 100. At the ARIA Music Awards of 1990 Moss won five categories Album of the Year, Best Male Artist and Breakthrough Artist – Album for Matchbook; and Single of the Year and Breakthrough Artist – Single for "Tucker's Daughter". His touring band in support of Matchbook consisted of Ian Belton on bass guitar (ex-QED), Guy Le Claire on rhythm guitar(Mar-Sept 1989)(ex-Eurogliders), Randy Bulpin on rhythm guitar (ex-Mondo Rock), Danny D'Costa on keyboards, Steve Fearnley on drums and Mark Williams and Mary Azzopardi on backing vocals.

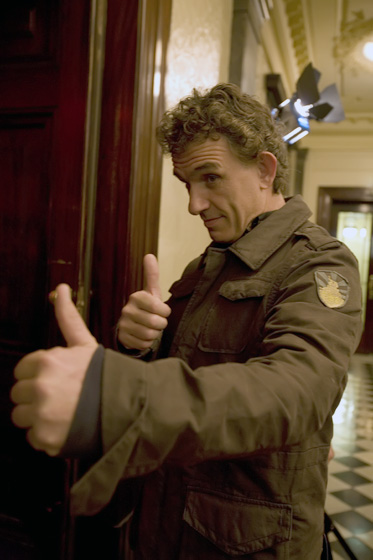
Moss at the ARIA Hall of Fame in Melbourne in July 2008. At the ARIA Music Awards of 1990 Moss won five categories Album of the Year, Best Male Artist and Breakthrough Artist – Album for Matchbook; and Single of the Year and Breakthrough Artist – Single for "Tucker's Daughter". In 1993 Cold Chisel, with Moss as a member, were inducted into the Hall of Fame.

In October 1991 Moss released his second album, Worlds Away, which featured "songs largely co-written with Don Walker in the soul/R&B vein". It reached the top 50 on both the ARIA and New Zealand charts. The album provided three singles, "Slip Away" (May), "She's a Star" (September) and "Never Give Up" (November); both "Slip Away" and "She's a Star" reached the ARIA Top 100.

Also that year Moss played in Don Walker's band Catfish, contributing guitar to their album, Ruby. Subsequently, he made guest appearances on albums by The Black Sorrows' Better Times (1992) on a track called "Ain't Love the Strangest Thing", Richard Clapton's Distant Thunder (1993), on Barnes' solo album, Heat (1993), the first time he had worked with Barnes in ten years. In June 1994 he provided lead guitar on the title track of Don Walker's solo album, We're All Gunna Die (1995). In 1993 Cold Chisel, with Moss as a member, were inducted into the ARIA Hall of Fame.

Moss's third solo album, Petrolhead, was released in August 1996, which was produced by Don Walker for TWA Records. For this album Moss used Walker on keyboards with Paul DeMarco on drums (ex-Rose Tattoo), the late Ian Rilen on bass guitar (from Rose Tattoo & X), and Trent Williamson on harmonica. McFarlane declared it was "his best-ever album ... [by] a down'n'dirty blues-rock outfit ... with gritty, hard-edged tracks ... [and] finely honed guitar work". Two singles were issued, "All Alone on a Rock" and "Poor Boy", but neither charted. It was re-released the following year as Ian Moss Box Set with an additional live CD, Ian Moss Live, the live disc was issued separately in 1998. Those live tracks had been recorded during 1996 to 1997 on his national tour supporting Petrolhead, with Rilen replaced by Paul Wheeler on bass guitar mid-tour.

=== 1997–2004: Cold Chisel reunion ===
From October 1997 to June 1998 Cold Chisel reunited to record a new studio album, The Last Wave of Summer (October 1998), and subsequently toured. In May 2003, another Cold Chisel tour, Ringside, resulted in a 2× CD live album of the same name in November.

=== 2005–present: Solo career continued ===
In 2005 Moss released his fourth studio album, Six Strings on Liberation Music. it was an acoustic album and included material from his time with Cold Chisel, his solo releases and cover versions of Jimi Hendrix and Creedence Clearwater Revival tracks. To support the release Moss undertook an extensive joint tour of Australia co-headlining with Jon Stevens (ex-Noiseworks, INXS).

Moss's next album, Let's All Get Together, was released in July 2007 on his own label, Mosstrooper (distributed by Liberation). It contained acoustic cover versions of Cold Chisel tracks and material written by Moss and/or his former band mates Walker, Prestwich and Small. The album reached the top 50 on the ARIA Albums Chart in October. From February to April 2008 Moss appeared on the third series of Australian TV celebrity singing contest, It Takes Two, where he was partnered by actress, Virginia Gay – they finished in the top three.

Moss travelled to New York in August 2008 to record his next album, Soul on West 53rd, which is a collection of mainly soul songs from the 1960s and 1970s. It was produced by Danny Korthmar, and featured Steve Jordan, Neil Jason, Leon Pendarvis and Hugh McCracken. It was released in October 2009 and peaked in the top 40 in Australia. Amazon.com editorial reviewer declared that Moss provides an "unforgettable sound – not only as a telling soloist on guitar but especially with his silken voice, ringing with clarity and resonating with pure soul". Antonios Sarhanis at Anagrammatically Correct felt it was a "good collection of covers, but why bother when the better originals are so freely available?".

In December 2009 Cold Chisel reconvened for a gig at Stadium Australia. In October 2010 Cold Chisel appeared at the Deni Ute Muster. Alongside their old work they premiered new material and announced they were working on another studio album. Recording of Cold Chisel's album, No Plans, was disrupted when Steven Prestwich was diagnosed with a brain tumour and died on 16 January 2011, aged 56. In October the group replaced Prestwich with former Divinyls drummer, Charley Drayton, and the album was issued in April 2012. Aside from lead guitar and backing vocals, Moss provided lead vocals on two tracks, "Too Late" and "Summer Moon". Cold Chisel supported the release with a national tour and then, in June, with performances in London.

In 2012 he made a guest appearance on the TV soap opera, Neighbours, playing a gig at Charlie's Bar. The episode was broadcast in the United Kingdom in October. In May that year Australian Guitar magazine listed Moss at number-three on their Definitive Top Ten Australian Guitarists of All Time. In January 2013 Moss, as a solo artist, joined the Red Hot Summer Tour, headlining that tour was Barnes. During June Cold Chisel announced they were in a recording studio. Moss followed with his own Australian tour starting in July.

Moss at a Don Walker concert in 2026

In March 2018, Moss released Ian Moss, his first solo album of all original material in 22 years. The album peaked at number 11 on the ARIA Charts.

He performed at the 2021 NRL Grand Final, singing "Flame Trees" alongside Kate Miller-Heidke, before performing his solo hit "Tucker's Daughter".

In July 2023, Moss released his eighth studio album Rivers Run Dry. The album was supported by a national tour commencing in August 2023.

== Personal life ==
Ian Moss was in a de facto relationship with Australian actress Megan Williams for eleven years until they split up in the 1990s. Williams supplied backing vocals on Cold Chisel's "Flame Trees" (August 1984). She died on 17 April 2000 of breast cancer, aged 43.

Moss and his partner, Margeaux Rolleston, have a son, Julian Moss – Six Strings has an instrumental track, "Song for Julian".

== Discography ==
=== Albums ===
- Matchbook (1989)
- Worlds Away (1991)
- Petrolhead (1996)
- Six Strings (2005)
- Let's All Get Together (2007)
- Soul on West 53rd (2009)
- Ian Moss (2018)
- Rivers Run Dry (2023)

=== See also ===
- Cold Chisel discography

== Awards and nominations ==
=== APRA Awards ===
The APRA Awards are held in Australia and New Zealand by the Australasian Performing Right Association to recognise songwriting skills, sales, and airplay performance by its members annually.

Year	Nominee / work	Award	Result	Ref.
2024	"Nullarbor Plain" (Moss and Troy Cassar-Daley)	Most Performed Rock Work	Nominated	

=== ARIA Music Awards ===
The ARIA Music Awards is an annual awards ceremony that recognises excellence, innovation, and achievement across all genres of Australian music. They commenced in 1987. Ian Moss has won five awards.

Year	Nominee / work	Award	Result	Ref.
1990	Matchbook	Album of the Year	Won	
1990	Matchbook	Best Male Artist	Won	
1990	Matchbook	Breakthrough Artist - Album	Won	
1990	"Tucker's Daughter"	Breakthrough Artist - Single	Won	
1990	"Tucker's Daughter"	Single of the Year	Nominated	
1990	"Tucker's Daughter"	Song of the Year	Won	
1993	himself (as part of Cold Chisel)	ARIA Hall of Fame	inducted	

=== CMA Awards ===
The Country Music Awards of Australia is an annual awards night held in January during the Tamworth Country Music Festival, celebrating recording excellence in the Australian country music industry.

Year	Nominee / work	Award	Result (wins only)
2022	"South" (with Troy Cassar-Daley)	Vocal Collaboration of the Year.	Won

== Notes ==
1. - For full name see Australasian Performing Right Association source for songwriter of "Answer Machine Blues".
  - For date and place of birth see Kevin Schluter in Bulletin with Newsweek.
  - For parents' names see The Advertiser Family Notices at National Library of Australia.
  - Additional detail from Ian Moss Biography supplied by his management, and Cold Chisel's Official Website.
  - Geoff's lifespan according to Matchbook's album notes dedication, and Government of Northern Territory's Place Names Register for Geoff Moss Bridge.
  - For mother's approximate year of birth see Angela Catterns interview on Conversation Hour where Moss says "she was 21 ... in about 1943".
