= Don Walker (musician) =

Australian musician and songwriter (born 1951)

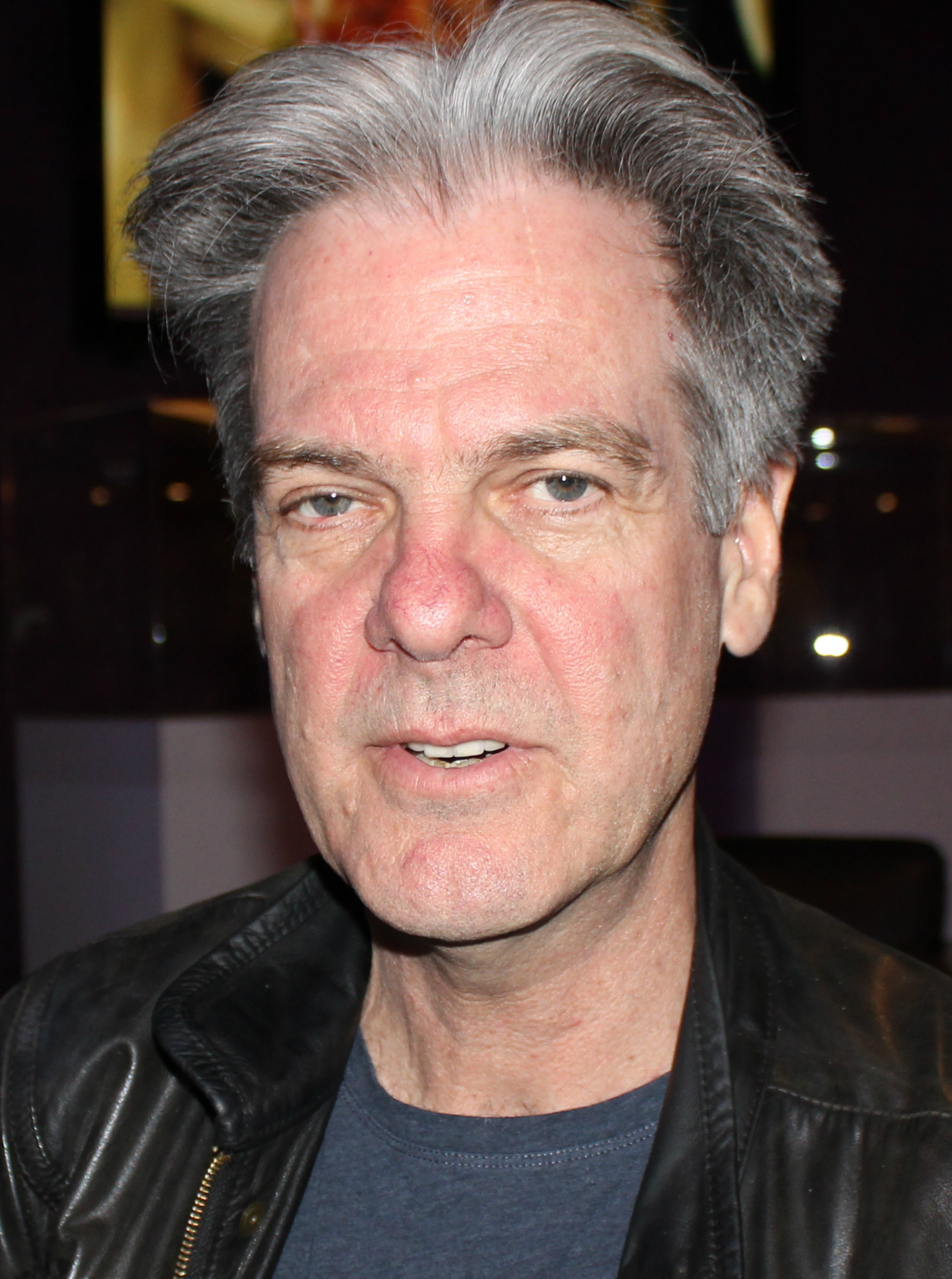
- Walker in 2015

Background information
- Born: Donald Hugh Walker; 29 November 1951 (age 74); Ayr, Queensland, Australia
- Genres: Rock; hard rock; pub rock; blues; alternative country
- Occupations: Musician; songwriter; author
- Instruments: Keyboards; piano; vocals
- Years active: 1973–present
- Labels: Mushroom; Universal Music Group
- Member of: Cold Chisel; Tex, Don and Charlie
- Website: donwalker.com.au

Donald Hugh Walker (born 29 November 1951) is an Australian musician and songwriter who wrote many of the hits for Australian pub rock band Cold Chisel. Walker is considered to be one of Australia's best songwriters. In 2012 he was inducted into the Australian Songwriters Hall of Fame.

He played piano and keyboard with Cold Chisel from 1973 to 1983, when they disbanded. He has since continued to record and tour, both solo, initially under the name Catfish and as Tex, Don and Charlie, and worked as a songwriter for others. In 2009, he released his first book.

Richard Clapton describes Walker as, "the most Australian writer there has ever been. Don just digs being a sort of Beat poet, who goes around observing, especially around the streets of Kings Cross. He soaks it up like a sponge and articulates it so well. Quite frankly, I think he's better than the rest of us."

== Biography ==
=== 1951–1972: Early life and family ===
Walker was born in Ayr, Queensland, to a farmer father and schoolteacher mother. His grandfather had served at Gallipoli in World War I, and then at the Battle of Pozières, where he was shot in the face. Returning to Australia, he married the sister of his best friend, who had died in the same battle.

Walker's father was a harmonica player and fan of Larry Adler. Walker said, "He was always very keen on gospel and blues music, and 30s swing. I was familiar with that before I could talk." He said his father was in, "the AIF in Palestine and Syria in WW2 and in what was then Ceylon and three tours of New Guinea." He owned a cane farm on Rita Island on the Burdekin River, where Walker lived until the age of 4. His family later moved to Carrs Creek, near Grafton, in 1956. In 1963, they moved into Grafton, where a local piano teacher, Dot Morris, taught him, "a little bit of Chopin.....a lot of Fats Waller repertoire, and also Winifred Atwell." Later, he, "got into organ and the main influences were Stevie Winwood's 60s stuff and Ray Manzarek."

Having completed a degree in physics in the 1970s at the University of New England residing at Robb College. Walker was working for the Weapons Research Establishment, modelling airflow around bomb-release pods on fighter jets, when he helped form Cold Chisel in 1973.

=== 1973–1983: Cold Chisel ===
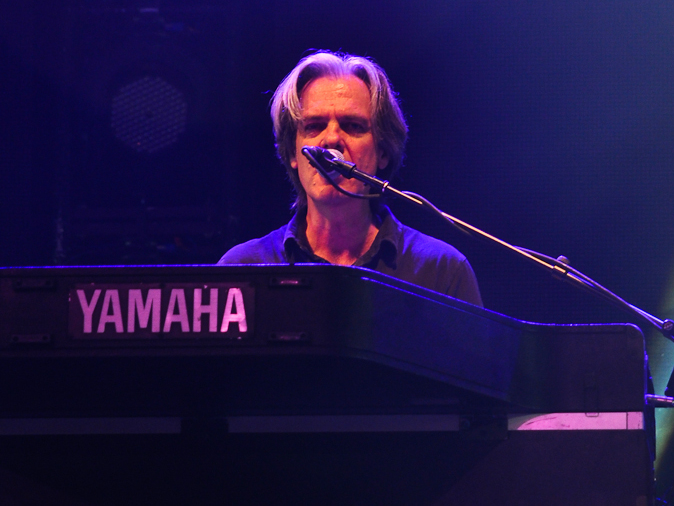
Walker performing with Cold Chisel in 2012.

Cold Chisel are an Australian pub rock band, formed in 1973. From the earliest days, Walker was a creative songwriting force for the band. He became known for his passionate and raw lyrical observations on the Australian society and culture of the time. His songwriting credits include the hit singles "Flame Trees," "Saturday Night," "Choirgirl,""Goodbye (Astrid Goodbye)", "Cheap Wine," and the Australian Vietnam war song "Khe Sanh" (voted the 8th greatest Australian song of all time by the Australasian Performing Right Association in 2001).

During his time with Cold Chisel, Walker produced his first work outside the band, the soundtrack of the Australian movie Freedom, directed by Scott Hicks. The soundtrack was released as an album and featured members of Cold Chisel and Michael Hutchence. The Age described it as, "the best rock music written for an Australian movie."

=== 1983–1991: hiatus & Catfish ===
After Cold Chisel disbanded in 1983, Walker had a five-year hiatus before resuming recording and performing. Initially, he had considered hiring an actor to mime the songs before deciding to front Catfish himself Ostensibly a band, Catfish was in effect a solo project, featuring Walker on vocals, keyboards and penning all the songs. Catfish featured various backing musicians, such as Charlie Owen, Ian Moss, Ricky Fataar and harmonica player David Blight.

The first album, Unlimited Address, released in 1989, showed a jazzier, Eastern European side to Walker's songwriting, reflecting his travels during the previous years. Despite being critically lauded, sales were moderate, the album reaching number 49 in the national charts. The second album, Ruby was a return to Australia in sound and lyrical subject matter. Again, it was well received by critics but sold relatively poorly. The track "Charleville" was later to receive country music awards when covered by Slim Dusty.

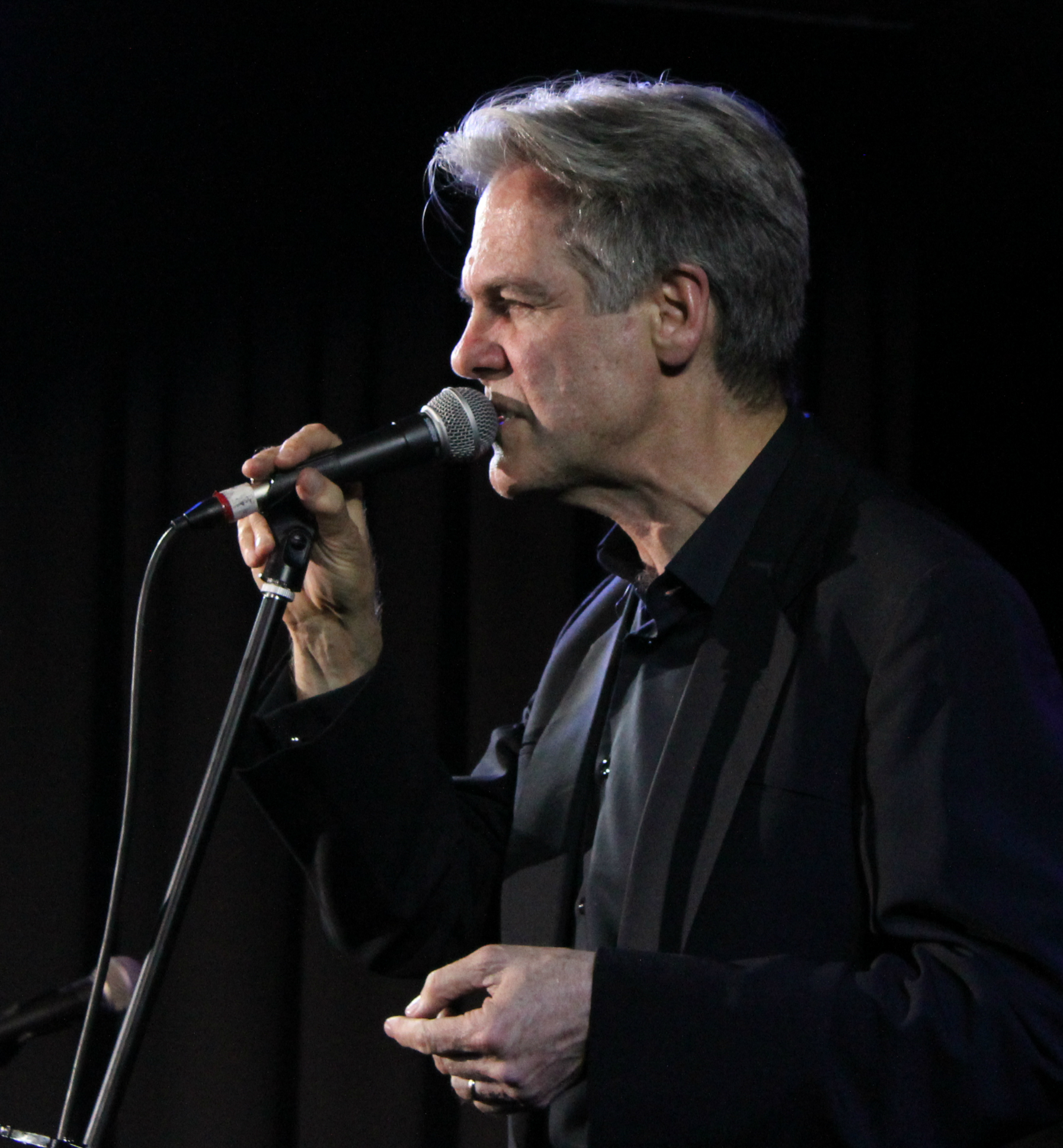
Walker performs live in Mullumbimby in 2015

=== 1992–present: Tex, Don and Charlie ===
In early 1992, Walker featured in an acoustic live performance for alternative radio station JJJ with Charlie Owen, James Cruickshank and Tex Perkins. Six months later, Perkins proposed to Walker that they record an album together. Walker described the recording as a number of informal afternoons spent jamming in the studio. "It wasn't an album approached with any sort of seriousness. It wasn't until we had it all done that we started to realise we might have something special."

In 1993 Tex, Don and Charlie released their first album, Sad but True on Red Eye Records. The record, an acoustic country-tinged affair, returned Walker to some level of popular awareness and received rave reviews in magazines like Australian Rolling Stone. About half the songs were written by Walker, including "Sitting in a Bar". The band toured strongly on the back of the album, later releasing a live album Monday Morning Coming Down..., featuring tracks from Sad But True.

2005 saw the release of a third Tex, Don and Charlie album, All is Forgiven, similar in style to the first. Again, Walker wrote about half the songs, including "Harry was a Bad Bugger", described by Chris Johnston as, "the Australian song of the year", and by Mess & Noise as, "one of the finest Australian compositions of the last 20 years." The album was shortlisted for the inaugural Australian Music Prize.

Walker in Marrickville, 2026

The trio continue to release music, including their 2017 album, You Don't Know Lonely, which peaked at number 14 on the ARIA Charts.

=== 1995–present: Solo career ===
In 1995, Walker's released his debut studio album under his own name, We're All Gunna Die. He stated that it was the first album to carry his name as, "it was the first record that finished up how I wanted it." Rehearsal sessions were held over four afternoons in Walker's lounge room, and all songs were recorded in 3 takes or less. The band featured David Blight, Garrett Costigan on pedal-steel guitar and Red Rivers on guitar. The music was a ragged mix of country, Chicago blues and balladry, and featured the song "Eternity".

Commencing in 2005, Walker toured Australia occasionally with his backing band, The Suave Fucks (named after a line from Blue Velvet). They featured Roy Payne on baritone guitar, Michael Vidale on bass, Hamish Stuart on drums, Garrett Costigan, and Glen Hannah on guitar until his death in 2019.

In 2009, Walker published his first book, Shots. It was an autobiographical collection of smaller pieces, rarely more than a few pages in length. The subject matter was mostly recollections of rural Australia or life with Cold Chisel before they became famous. A separate piece by Walker had previously been included in The Best Australian Essays collection for 2007. Shots received a number of positive reviews: The Age described the memoir as "a whip crack across a landscape of rural Australia, lonely highways and endless gigs;" in the Australian Book Review it was called "a quite wonderful book [that] blasts away every last vestige of the crude, boozy, foot-stomping, flag-waving Australiana that has until now enveloped the Cold Chisel story like a filthy smog, leaving behind only the simmering highways, the trashy motels, the dank pubs and the monotonous suburbs of a nation slouching apathetically through the remnants of the 20th century." Readings from Shots, as performed by Walker, were aired on Radio National throughout late 2009.

In 2011, Walker released his first live album, Live in Queenscliff. The album features a performance with The Suave Fucks at the 2006 Queenscliff Music Festival.

In August 2013, Walker released Hully Gully, which was recorded with the Suave Fucks over a decade. Joe Henry was asked to mix the album because Walker was impressed by his work on the Allen Toussaint album The Bright Mississippi, saying, "it sounded like Duke Ellington produced by Jimmy Page. I just fell in love with the record." Named after a simple 60s dance, it was thought by some to be his best album to date, but failed to chart.

In March 2018, Walker released a six-album vinyl box set of his solo back catalogue. Five of the albums had never been on vinyl before, with Walker saying "It's a way of reviewing the whole catalogue, without doing a best-of."

In 2019 Walker released the book Songs; a publication of Walker solo work and collaborations over 40 years from Cold Chisel to Tex, Don & Charlie and his solo albums.

In April 2022, Walker was presented the Doctor of Letters honoris causa degree from his alma mater, the University of New England, for contributions to Australian music. Graduation was delayed due to Covid-19.

Walker with the Harmonettes

Walker released Lightning in a Clear Blue Sky in 2023, followed by two East Coast Australian tours. It reached number 2 on the Australian Independent charts. With the death of guitarists Glen Hannah and Roy Payne, Shannon Bourne was introduced as the new guitarist in the live band and future albums. The album also saw the debut of the Harmonettes, a 3-piece of backing singers including Erica Dunn.

Walker's fifth album, Love Songs, was released in August 2026 and a national tour followed.. Reaching 41 on the ARIA charts, it was the highest-peaking album of his solo career. On this tour his live band had swollen to 13, with the Suave Fucks, a four piece horn section, his brother Richard on additional piano, and the Harmonettes.

== Collaborations ==
Walker has worked with many other artists, most notably with song writing credits on Ian Moss' hit album, Matchbook and Jimmy Barnes' top ten single "Stone Cold". He has written with or had songs recorded by TOFOG, Jimmy Little, Kate Ceberano, Wendy Matthews, Wes Carr, Troy Cassar-Daley, Graeme Connors, Anne Kirkpatrick, Mick Harvey, Missy Higgins, Busby Marou, Melinda Schneider, Sarah Blasko, Katie Noonan, Jeff Lang, Normie Rowe and Adam Brand. Two Walker-penned songs appeared on The Very Best of Slim Dusty, which stayed in the Australian country charts for over 15 years. He also produced Moss' album Petrolhead.

== Personal life ==
He is the brother of the Australian novelist, Brenda Walker and son of Australian novelist Shirley Walker. He is a Brisbane Broncos supporter.

== Discography ==
=== Studio albums ===
List of albums, with selected chart positions
Title	Album details	Peak chart positions
Title	Album details	AUS
Freedom: Original Soundtrack Music	Released: 1981; Format: LP; Label: WEA	—
Unlimited Address (as Catfish)	Released: 17 October 1988; Formats: LP, CD, cassette; Label: WEA	50
Ruby (as Catfish)	Released: September 1991; Formats: CD; Label: EastWest	98
We're All Gonna Die	Released: 1995; Formats: LP, CD; Label: Salt	—
Cutting Back	Released: July 2006; Formats: CD, digital download; Label: Warner Music Australia	—
Hully Gully	Released: 16 August 2013; Formats: CD, DD, LP; Label: Salt	—
Lightning in a Clear Blue Sky	Released: 5 May 2023; Formats: CD, DD, LP; Label: Salt	—
Love Songs	Released: 7 August 2026; Formats: CD, DD, LP; Label: Salt	41

=== Live albums ===
List of albums, with selected details
Title	Details
Live in Queenscliff (with the Big Friendly Sound of the Suave Fucks)	Released: 14 February 2011; Formats: CD, DD; Label: Salt (SALT004)
Live at the Caravan (with the Warm Neighbourly Sound of the Suave Fucks)	Released: 2013; Formats: CD, DD, LP; Label: Salt (SALT006)
Songs: Live at Camelot Lounge 2018	Released: 2018; Formats: DD; Label: Don Walker; Note: Recorded at Camelot Lounge, Marrickville, 19 April 2018

=== Box set ===
List of box sets, with selected details
Title	Details
Blacktop	Released: 23 March 2018; Formats: 6×LP; Label: Salt; Note: features Unlimited Address, Ruby, We're All Gunna Die, Cutting Back, Hully Gully, Live at the Caravan

=== Singles ===
List of singles, with selected details
Year	Title	Album
1988	"When You Dance"	Unlimited Address
1988	"Early Hours"	Unlimited Address
1989	"Hiwire Girl"	Unlimited Address
1991	"Johnny's Gone"	Ruby
1991	"Crooked Smile"	Ruby
2013	"Young Girls"	Hully Gully
2023	"Lightning in a Clear Blue Sky"	Lightning in a Clear Blue Sky
2023	"When I Win the Lottery"	Lightning in a Clear Blue Sky
2023	"Jungle Pam"	Lightning in a Clear Blue Sky
2026	"Let's All Get Together"	Love Songs
2026	"Breakfast in Paris"	Love Songs
2026	"Luck"	Love Songs

=== See also ===
- Tex, Don and Charlie

== Awards and nominations ==
=== APRA Awards ===
The APRA Awards are held in Australia and New Zealand by the Australasian Performing Right Association to recognise songwriting skills, sales and airplay performance by its members annually. Walker has won one award from five nominations.

Year	Nominee / work	Award	Result
2001	"Good Friends" by Adam Brand (written by Don Walker & Myles Walker)	Most Performed Country Work of the Year	Nominated
2001	"Looking Forward Looking Back" by Slim Dusty (written by Don Walker)	Most Performed Country Work of the Year	Nominated
2001	"Looking Forward Looking Back" by Slim Dusty (written by Don Walker)	Song of the Year	Nominated
2008	"Everything's Going to Be Alright" by Adam Brand (written by Adam Brand, Sam Hawksley & Don Walker)	Country Work of the Year	Won
2009	"Coming From / Khe Sanh" by Troy Cassar-Daley (written by Troy Cassar-Daley & Don Walker)	Country Work of the Year	Nominated
2012	"All for You" by Cold Chisel (Don Walker)	Song of the Year	Shortlisted
2014	"Luck" by Busby Marou (written by Thomas Busby and Don Walker)	Blues and Roots Work of the Year	Nominated
2016	Cold Chisel (Jimmy Barnes, Ian Moss, Don Walker, Phil Small and Steve Prestwich)	Ted Albert Award for Outstanding Services to Australian Music	recipient
2016	"Lost" (Don Walker, Wes Carr)	Song of the Year	Shortlisted
2021	"Getting the Band Back Together" (Don Walker)	Most Performed Rock Work	Won
2021	"Getting the Band Back Together" (Don Walker)	Song of the Year	Shortlisted

=== ARIA Music Awards ===
The ARIA Music Awards is an annual awards ceremony that recognises excellence, innovation, and achievement across all genres of Australian music. They commenced in 1987.

Year	Nominee / work	Award	Result	Ref.
1989	Unlimited Address	Breakthrough Artist – Album	Nominated	
1989	"When You Dance"	Breakthrough Artist – Single	Nominated	
1990	"Tucker's Daughter" (written by Ian Moss and Don Walker)	Song of the Year	Won	

=== Australian Songwriters Hall of Fame ===
The Australian Songwriters Hall of Fame was established in 2004 to honour the lifetime achievements of some of Australia's greatest songwriters.

Year	Nominee / work	Award	Result
2012	himself	Australian Songwriters Hall of Fame	inducted

=== TV Week / Countdown Awards ===
Countdown was an Australian pop music TV series on national broadcaster ABC-TV from 1974–1987, it presented music awards from 1979–1987, initially in conjunction with magazine TV Week. The TV Week / Countdown Awards were a combination of popular-voted and peer-voted awards.

Year	Nominee / work	Award	Result
1979	Don Walker - "Choirgirl" by Cold Chisel	Best Recorded Songwriter	Nominated
1980	Don Walker (Cold Chisel)	Best Recorded Songwriter	Won
1984	Don Walker (Cold Chisel)	Best Songwriter	Nominated
