= Diesel discography =

- Studio albums: 16
- EPs: 6
- Live albums: 2
- Compilation albums: 4
- Singles: 40
- Video albums: 6

The discography of Mark Denis Lizotte (also known as Diesel and Johnny Diesel), an American-born Australian singer-songwriter. He has released sixteen studio albums, as well as two live album and four compilation albums.

He has won five ARIA Music Awards, including three for Best Male Artist in 1993, 1994 and 1995.

== Albums ==
=== Studio albums ===
Title	Details	Peak chart positions		Certifications (sales thresholds)
Title	Details	AUS	NZ	Certifications (sales thresholds)
Johnny Diesel and The Injectors (as Johnny Diesel and the Injectors)	Released: March 1989; Label: Chrysalis/Festival	2	25	ARIA: 2× Platinum
Hepfidelity	Released: March 1992; Label: Chrysalis/EMI	1	1	ARIA: 3× Platinum
The Lobbyist	Released: 9 August 1993; Label: EMI	1	27	ARIA: Gold
Solid State Rhyme	Released: November 1994; Label: EMI	10	—	ARIA: Gold
Short Cool Ones (with Chris Wilson)	Released: March 1996; Label: EMI	18	—	
Soul Lost Companion (as Mark Lizotte)	Released: September 1999; Label: Festival, Warner	18	—	
Hear	Released: October 2002; Label: Hepfidelity, MGM	151	—	
Coathanger Antennae	Released: June 2006; Label: Liberation	23	—	
Days Like These	Released: August 2008; Label: Liberation	17	—	
Project Blues: Saturday Suffering Fools	Released: 20 July 2009; Label: Liberation	50	—	
Under the Influence	Released: 4 July 2011; Label: Liberation	57	—	
Let It Fly	Released: 9 August 2013; Label: Liberation	31	—	
Americana	Released: 1 July 2016; Label: Liberation	15	—	
Sunset Suburbia	Released: 28 August 2020; Label: Bloodlines (BLOOD72)	10	—	
Alone with Blues	Released: 16 July 2021; Label: Bloodlines (BLOOD89)	20	—	
Bootleg Melancholy	Released: 13 October 2023; Label: Bloodlines (BLOOD110)	43	—	
"—" denotes releases that did not chart or were not released in that country.

=== Live albums ===
Title	Details	Peak chart positions
Title	Details	AUS
Singled Out	Released: 2004; Live Acoustic album (and 4 studio tracks); Label: Liberation Blue	78
Greatest Hits Live	Released: 3 June 2011; Label: Liberation	—

=== Compilation albums ===
Title	Details	Peak chart positions	Certifications
Title	Details	AUS	Certifications
Rewind – The Best Of	Released: October 1996; Label: EMI	—	ARIA: Gold
The Essential Diesel	Released: February 2009; Label: EMI	—	
You Get There from Here	Released: 8 June 2012; Label: Liberation	199	
30: The Greatest Hits	Released: 3 August 2018; Label: Bloodlines / Universal Music Australia	16	

== EPs ==
Title	Details	Peak chart positions
Title	Details	AUS
Live in London	Released: 10 July 1989; Label: Chrysalis Records/ EMI	27
iTunes Live From Sydney: Aussie Legends	Released: 20 October 2009; Label: Liberation	—
7 Axes	Released: 4 February 2011; Label: Liberation	71
Last Shower (with Tim Chaisson)	Released: 11 October 2013; Label: Liberation	—
Sunset Suburbia Vol 1	Released: 2 August 2019; Label: Bloodlines	—
Sunset Suburbia Vol 2	Released: 8 November 2019; Label: Bloodlines	—
Skin and Bone (The Flesh and Blood Demos) (Jimmy Barnes featuring Diesel)	Released: 15 October 2021; Label: Bloodlines	—

== Singles ==
List of singles as lead artist, with selected chart positions and certifications
Title	Year	Peak chart positions			Album
Title	Year	AUS	NZ	UK	Album
Credited as Johnny Diesel & The Injectors
"Don't Need Love"	1988	10	7	83	Johnny Diesel and the Injectors
"Soul Revival"	1989	9	—	—	Johnny Diesel and the Injectors
"Cry In Shame"	1989	10	—	—	Johnny Diesel and the Injectors
"Lookin' for Love"	1989	28	—	—	Johnny Diesel and the Injectors
"Since I Fell for You"	1989	79	—	—	Johnny Diesel and the Injectors
"Please Send Me Someone to Love"	1990	11	—	—	The Delinquents
Credited as Johnny Diesel
"Love Junk"	1991	19	—	—	Hepfidelity
Credited as Diesel
"Come to Me"	1991	8	3	93	Hepfidelity
"Tip of My Tongue"	1992	4	3	78	Hepfidelity
"Man Alive"	1992	20	25	—	Hepfidelity
"One More Time"	1992	59	39	—	Hepfidelity
"Never Miss Your Water"	1993	12	17	—	The Lobbyist
"Masterplan"	1993	42	—	—	The Lobbyist
"I've Been Loving You Too Long"	1993	41	—	—	The Lobbyist
"Still Got a Long Way to Go" (with Jimmy Barnes)	1994	57	—	—	Flesh and Wood (Jimmy Barnes album)
"All Come Together"	1994	17	—	—	Solid State Rhyme.
"15 Feet of Snow"	1995	29	—	—	Solid State Rhyme.
"Get It On"	1995	75	—	—	Solid State Rhyme.
"I Can't Stand the Rain" (with Chris Wilson)	1996	66	—	—	Short Cool Ones
"Strange Love" (with Chris Wilson)	1996	—	—	—	Short Cool Ones
Credited as Mark Lizotte
"Dig"	1999	18	—	—	Soul Lost Companion
"Satellite"	1999	130	—	—	Soul Lost Companion
Credited as Diesel
"Getta Kick"	2002	115	—	—	Hear
"Battleworn"	2002	—	—	—	Hear
"Angel Face"	2003	—	—	—	Hear
"Faith & Gasoline"	2003	—	—	—	Hear
"Postcards from the Moon"	2005	—	—	—	non-album single
"Crazytown"	2006	39	—	—	Coathanger Antennae
"Saviour"	2006	102	—	—	Coathanger Antennae
"Steal My Sunshine"	2007	—	—	—	Coathanger Antennae
"Days Like This"	2008	—	—	—	Days Like These
"Have Love, Will Travel"	2011	—	—	—	7 Axes
"Highway Mind"	2012	—	—	—	Bikie Wars: Brothers in Arms (soundtrack)
"Angel from Montgomery"	2016	—	—	—	Americana
"Queen Jane Approximately"	2016	—	—	—	Americana
"Ring of Fire"	2016	—	—	—	Americana
"Give Me Saturday Night"	2018	—	—	—	30: The Greatest Hits
"By the Scars"	2019	—	—	—	Sunset Suburbia Vol. 1
"In Reverse"	2019	—	—	—	Sunset Suburbia Vol. 2
"On the Inside"	2020	—	—	—	Sunset Suburbia
"Six Steel Strings"	2021	—	—	—	Alone with Blues
"Lost and Lookin'"	2021	—	—	—	Alone with Blues
"Forever"	2023	—	—	—	Bootleg Melancholy
"Pasadena"	2023	—	—	—	Bootleg Melancholy
"Remember My Love"	2024	—	—	—	Bootleg Melancholy
"Tender"	2026	—	—	—	Tender

== Videos / DVDs ==
- Johnny Diesel and the Injectors (1989)
- Hepfidelity and More (1993)
- The First Fifteen '89–'04 Live (2004)
- Diesel + Strings: Live at the Vanguard (2006)
- Song Companion (2007)
- The 4 Corners Live (2009)
