= 30: The Greatest Hits =

Greatest hits album by Diesel
- Released: 3 August 2018
- Recorded: 1988–2018
- Label: Bloodlines, Universal Music Australia

Diesel chronology
Americana (2016)	30: The Greatest Hits (2018)	Sunset Suburbia (2020)

Singles from Americana
- 1. "Give Me Saturday Night" Released: 26 May 2018

30: The Greatest Hits (also known as Diesel 30) is a greatest hits album by Australian rock musician, Diesel (a.k.a. Johnny Diesel, Mark Lizotte) who previously fronted Johnny Diesel & the Injectors.

The album was released on 3 August 2018 via Bloodlines, Universal Music Australia and features 14 Top 40 hits.

The album was supported by a "Give Me Saturday Night" tour with Diesel saying "I can't wait to light up Saturday nights right across Australia on this very special 30th Anniversary Tour".

== Reception ==
Jeff Jenkins from Stack Magazine said "The album tells the tale of an artist who rose above the marketing and the hype to create a compelling catalogue."

== Track listing ==
CD1
No.	Title	Writer(s)	Album	Length
1.	"Give Me Saturday Night"		new recording	3:40
2.	"Don't Need Love" (credited to Johnny Diesel & The Injectors)	Diesel	Johnny Diesel and the Injectors	4:12
3.	"Soul Revival (radio mix) " (credited to Johnny Diesel & The Injectors)	Diesel	Johnny Diesel and the Injectors	4:03
4.	"Lookin' for Love" (credited to Johnny Diesel & The Injectors)	Diesel	Johnny Diesel and the Injectors	3:31
5.	"Cry in Shame" (credited to Johnny Diesel & The Injectors)	Diesel	Johnny Diesel and the Injectors	4:44
6.	"Since I Fell for You" (credited to Johnny Diesel & The Injectors)	Buddy Johnson	Johnny Diesel and the Injectors	5:37
7.	"Love Junk"	Diesel	Hepfidelity	3:46
8.	"Tip of My Tongue"	Diesel; John Daniel Tate	Hepfidelity	4:12
9.	"Come to Me"	Diesel	Hepfidelity	4:22
10.	"Man Alive"	Diesel; Tom DeLuca	Hepfidelity	4:48
11.	"One More Time"	Diesel; Jerry Lynn Williams	Hepfidelity	4:03
12.	"Never Miss Your Water"	Diesel; Tate	The Lobbyist	3:57
13.	"Masterplan"	Diesel	The Lobbyist	5:25
14.	"I've Been Loving You Too Long"	Jerry Butler; Otis Redding	The Lobbyist	3:54
15.	"All Come Together"	Diesel; Guy Davies	Solid State Rhyme	4:48

CD2
No.	Title	Writer(s)	Album	Length
1.	"15 Feet of Snow"	Diesel	Solid State Rhyme	5:16
2.	"I Can't Stand the Rain" (with Chris Wilson)	Ann Peebles; Don Bryant; Bernard Miller	Short Cool Ones	3:46
3.	"Dig"	Diesel; Davies	Soul Lost Companion	4:53
4.	"Satellite"	Diesel; Dave Derby	Soul Lost Companion	3:47
5.	"Angel Face"	Diesel	Hear	3:07
6.	"Getta Kick"	Diesel; Davies	Hear	3:56
7.	"Battleworm"	Diesel	Hear	4:17
8.	"Saviour"		Coathanger Antennae	4:30
9.	"Crazytown"	Diesel	Coathanger Antennae	3:31
10.	"Steal My Sunshine"		Coathanger Antennae	3:55
11.	"Days Like These"	Diesel	Days Like These	3:24
12.	"Walkin' the Blues"	Diesel	Project Blues: Saturday Suffering Fools	3:35
13.	"Let It Fly"	Diesel	Let It Fly	4:31
14.	"Queen Jane Approximately"	Bob Dylan	Americana	4:13
15.	"Rave On"	Sonny West; Bill Tilghman; Norman Petty	Americana	2:31

== Give Me Saturday Night Tour ==
Date	Location	Venue
14 September 2018	Rozelle, NSW	The Bridge Hotel
15 September 2018	Rozelle, NSW	The Bridge Hotel
21 September 2018	Miranda, NSW	Miranda Hotel
22 September 2018	Pittwater, NSW	Pittwater RSL
5 October 2018	Hillarys, WA	Northshore Tavern
6 October 2018	Perth, WA	Charles Hotel
7 October 2018	Ravenswood, WA	Ravenswood Hotel
12 October 2018	Brisbane, QLD	The Triffid
13 October 2018	Maroochydore, QLD	Sol Bar
25 October 2018	Melbourne, Vic	Corner Hotel
26 October 2018	Chelsea, Vic	Chelsea Heights Hotel
27 October 2018	Nunawading, Vic	Burvale Hotel
2 November 2018	Adelaide, SA	The Governor Hindmarsh Hotel
3 November 2018	Wallaroo, SA	Coopers Alehouse
16 November 2018	Kingsford, NSW	The Juniors
17 November 2018	Wentworthville, NSW	Wenty Leagues

== Charts ==
Chart (2018)	Peak position
Australian Albums (ARIA)	16

== Release history ==
Region	Date	Format(s)	Label	Catalogue
Australia	3 August 2018	CD, digital download, streaming	Bloodlines, Universal Music Australia	6773827
Australia	31 August 2018	2×vinyl	Bloodlines, Universal Music Australia	BLOODLP32
