= The 4 Corners Live =

Live album by Diesel

Video by Diesel
- Released: 6 July 2009
- Recorded: 24–25 October 2008
- Venue: The Palms at Crown, Melbourne
- Genre: Rock
- Label: Liberation
- Producer: Richard Bailey, Diesel

Diesel chronology
Song Companion (2007)	The 4 Corners Live (2009)

The 4 Corners Live is a live DVD by Australian-American rock musician, Diesel. It was released on 6 July 2009.

The DVD was recorded on 24 and 25 October 2008, at The Palms at Crown, Melbourne. The content spanned Diesel's entire career up to and including tracks from his 2008 album, Days Like These.

An audio recording from the concerts was released as a live album on CD on 1 March 2010 as The 4 Corners Live. It was re-released on 3 June 2011 as Greatest Hits Live.

== Track listing ==
DVD

1. "Ain't Giving Up"
2. "Walk On By"
3. "Don't Need Love"
4. "Prisoner"
5. "Please Send Me Someone to Love"
6. "Sun Is Shining"
7. "Walkin' The Blues"
8. "Master Plan"
9. "15 Feet of Snow"
10. "To Sir With Love"
11. "Crimson Man"
12. "Need Your Fire"
13. "Days Like These"
14. "Take My Heart"
15. "Never Miss Your Water"
16. "Lay Down Here"
17. "Love Junk"
18. "Tip of My Tongue"
19. "Come To Me"
20. "Cry In Shame"
21. "I Can't Stand the Rain"
22. "Steal My Sunshine"
23. "Man Alive"

== Greatest Hits Live ==
Greatest Hits Live

Live album by Diesel
- Released: 3 June 2011
- Recorded: 24 – 25 October 2008; The Palms at Crown, Melbourne
- Genre: Soft rock, blues, pop rock
- Length: 79:49
- Label: Liberation
- Producer: Richard Bailey, Diesel

Diesel chronology
7 Axes (2011)	Greatest Hits Live (2011)	Under the Influence (2011)

Greatest Hits Live or The 4 Corners Live is a live album by rock musician, Diesel. It was recorded on 24 and 25 October 2008 at The Palms at Crown in Melbourne and released in June 2011 via Liberation to celebrate his 25 years in the industry.

The concert was released on DVD in July 2009 under the title The 4 Corners Live. A CD version under that title had been issued on 1 March 2010 via Universal Music Australia.

=== Reception ===
According to Amazon.com editor Greatest Hits Live, "brilliantly captures one of the greatest singers, songwriters and guitar players in the country. Including songs from his Injector days like 'Don't Need Love' through to tracks from his ARIA award winning album of the year like 'Tip of My Tongue', this is one smokin' album."

=== Track listing ===
1. "Don't Need Love" - 3:46
2. "Masterplan" - 5:07
3. "15 Feet of Snow" - 5:29
4. "Days Like These" - 3:29
5. "Crimison Man" - 3:01
6. "Need Your Fire" - 3:24
7. "Never Miss Your Water" - 4:03
8. "Lay Down Here" - 3:36
9. "Love Junk" - 4:47
10. "Tip of My Tongue" - 7:10
11. "Come to Me" - 16:14
12. "Cry In Shame" - 3:40
13. "I Can't Stand the Rain" - 5:02
14. "Steal My Sunshine" - 4:47
15. "Man Alive" - 6:14

=== Release history ===
Region	Date	Format(s)	Label	Catalogue
Australia	3 June 2011	Digital download / Compact Disc	Liberation Records	LMCD0138
United States of America	14 June 2011	Digital download	Liberation Records	
