= The First Fifteen '89–'04 Live =

Video by Diesel
- Released: November 2004
- Recorded: March 2003 (Live at The Metro Theatre, Sydney, NSW)
- Genre: Rock music, Soft rock, Soul music
- Label: EMI Music
- Producer: Mark Jago

Diesel chronology
'Hepfidelity and More' (1993)	The First Fifteen '89–'04 Live (2004)	Diesel + Strings: Live at the Vanguard (2006)

"The First Fifteen '89–'04 Live" is a live DVD by Australian musician Diesel. It was recorded in March 2003, at The Metro Theatre, Sydney, Australia. The DVD was certified gold in Australia in 2006.

== Track listing ==
1. "Intro"
2. "One More Time" (diesel / Jerry Williams)
3. "15 Feet of Snow" (diesel)
4. "All Come Together" (diesel / Guy Davies)
5. "I've Been Loving You Too Long" (Jerry Butler / Otis Redding)
6. "Getta Kick" (diesel / Guy Davies)
7. "Faith & Gasoline" (diesel)
8. "Come to Me" (diesel)
9. "Everybody’s Talkin’" (Fred Neil)
10. "Never Miss Your Water" (diesel / Danny Tate)
11. "Angel Face" (diesel)
12. "Lookin’ For Love" (diesel)
13. "Tip of My Tongue" (diesel / Danny Tate)
14. "Love Junk" (diesel)
15. "Dig" (diesel / Guy Davies)
16. "Cry In Shame" (diesel)
17. "Darling Of The Universe" (diesel)
18. " Masterplan" (diesel)
19. "Soul Revival" (diesel)
20. "Sun Is Shining" (Bob Marley)
21. "I Can't Stand the Rain" (Ann Peebles / Donald Bryant / Bernard Miller)
22. "Man Alive" (diesel / Thomas De Luca)

== Charts ==
Chart (2004)	Peak position
Australian DVD (ARIA Charts)	40

== Certification ==
Region	Certification	Certified units/sales
Australia (ARIA)	Gold	7,500^{^}
^{^} Shipments figures based on certification alone.
