= Live at the Vanguard =

Video by Diesel
- Released: 4 November 2006
- Recorded: December 2005, The Vanguard, NSW, Australia
- Genre: Rock music, Soft rock, Soul music
- Label: Liberation Music
- Producer: Tim Spicer

Diesel chronology
The First Fifteen '89–'04 Live (2004)	Live at the Vanguard (2006)	Song Companion (2007)

"Live at The Vanguard" is a video credited to Australian musician Diesel and Strings. It was recorded in December 2005, The Vanguard, NSW, Australia and released in November 2006. It came with a bonus CD of all of the songs, except "Dig".

== Track listing ==
DVD

1. "Crazytown" (diesel)
2. "Tip Of My Tongue" (diesel / Danny Tate)
3. "Don’t Send Another" (diesel / G. Wattenberg)
4. "Saviour" (diesel)
5. "15 Feet of Snow" (diesel)
6. "Don't Need Love" (diesel)
7. "I Do" (diesel)
8. "Meaning Of Life" (Peter Wells / Lucy De Soto)
9. "Beautiful Life" (diesel)
10. "Dig" (diesel / Guy Davies)
11. "Come to Me" (diesel)
12. "Darling Of The Universe" (diesel)
13. "Positive" (diesel)
14. "Faith & Gasoline" (diesel)
15. "Cry In Shame" (diesel)

CD

1. "Crazytown"
2. "Tip Of My Tongue"
3. "Don’t Send Another"
4. "Saviour"
5. "15 Feet of Snow"
6. "Don’t Need Love"
7. "I Do"
8. "Meaning Of Life"
9. "Beautiful Life"
10. "Come To Me"
11. "Darling Of The Universe"
12. "Positive"
13. "Faith & Gasoline"
14. "Cryin’ Shame"
