= You Get There from Here =

Compilation album by Diesel
- Released: 8 June 2012
- Genre: Soft rock, blues, pop rock
- Label: Liberation Records

Diesel chronology
Under the Influence (2011)	You Get There from Here (2012)	Let It Fly (2013)

You Get There from Here is a compilation album by Australian rock musician Diesel. The album was released on 8 June 2012. The album contains 14 tracks "hand-picked" by Diesel himself.

== Track listing ==
1. "15 Feet of Snow" – 5:!5
2. "All Come Together" – 4:45
3. "Never Miss Your Water" – 3:55
4. "I've Been Loving You Too Long" (Acoustic) – 3:52
5. "Masterplan" – 5:19
6. "Days Like These" – 3:24
7. "Ain't Giving Up" – 4:28
8. "Saviour" – 4:28
9. "Steal My Sunshine" – 3:53
10. "Man Alive" (Live) – 6:14
11. "Faith and Gasoline" – 3:40
12. "Tip of My Tongue" (Live) – 7:08
13. "Cry in Shame" (Live) – 3:41
14. "Come to Me" (Acoustic) – 4:28

== Charts ==
Chart performance for You Get There from Here
Chart (2012)	Peak position
Australian Albums (ARIA)	199

== Release history ==
Region	Date	Format(s)	Label	Catalogue
Australia	8 June 2012	Digital download / Compact Disc	Liberation	LMCD0166
