= Crazy Town (disambiguation) =

Crazy Town is an American rap rock band.

Crazy Town or Crazytown may refer to:

- "Crazy Town", a song by Velocity Girl from their album Copacetic
- "Crazy Town" (song), a 2010 song by Jason Aldean
- "Crazytown", a song by Aimee Mann from their album Charmer
- Crazy Town (film), a 1932 short animated film
- Crazy Town: The Rob Ford Story, a 2014 book by Robyn Doolittle
- Crazytown, a 1954 Noveltoons cartoon
- "Crazytown" (Diesel song), 2006
- Crazy Town, podcast from Post Carbon Institute
