= Song Companion =

Video by Diesel
- Released: 2007
- Label: EMI Music, Hal Leonard Australia

Diesel chronology
Live at the Vanguard (2006)	Song Companion (2007)	The 4 Corners Live (2009)

"Song Companion" is a 2007 DVD and music book by Australian musician Diesel. The DVD includes biographical information about Diesel, and background information about the songs; Lyrics, melody line, chord symbols, guitar chord diagrams (with notated rhythm), and some guitar tablature for breaks and fills.

== Track listing ==
DVD

1. "One More Time"
2. "Saviour"
3. "Tip Of My Tongue"
4. "15 Feet of Snow"
5. "Darling Of The Universe"
6. "Cry In Shame"
