= Get It On (Diesel song) =

1995 single by Diesel

Single by Diesel

from the album Solid State Rhyme
- B-side: "Mercurial Girl"; "Wrapping Paper"
- Released: 5 June 1995
- Studio: Freight Train, Studios 301 (Sydney, Australia)
- Length: 3:02
- Label: EMI
- Songwriter: Diesel
- Producers: Diesel, Craig Porteils

Diesel singles chronology
"15 Feet of Snow" (1995)	"Get It On" (1995)	"I Can't Stand the Rain" (1996)

"Get It On" is a song by Australian rock musician Diesel. It was released in June 1995 as the third and final single from his third studio album, Solid State Rhyme (1994). It peaked at number 75 in Australia in June 1995.

== Track listing ==
CD single

1. "Get It On" – 3:02
2. "Mercurial Girl" – 3:21
3. "Wrapping Paper" – 4:07

== Charts ==
Weekly chart performance for "Get It On"
Chart (1995)	Peak position
Australia (ARIA)	75
