= Singled Out (Diesel album) =

Live album by Diesel
- Released: August 2004
- Recorded: Dim Sams (tracks 1–4); April/May 2004 (Cornish Arms Hotel, Peninsula Arms Hotel and The Brass Monkey) (tracks 5–14)
- Genre: Acoustic, Blues music
- Length: 63:57
- Label: Liberation Blue
- Producer: Diesel

Diesel chronology
Hear (2002)	Singled Out (2004)	Coathanger Antennae (2006)

Singled Out is a live album by Diesel released in 2004. It captures a collection of material performed solo/acoustic by Diesel. The album was nominated for Best Adult Contemporary album at the ARIA Music Awards of 2004, but lost to Ways & Means by Paul Kelly.

Tracks 1–4 are "studio" tracks, recorded and mixed at Dim Sams. Tracks 5–14 are "live" tracks recorded in April and May 2004 at Cornish Arms Hotel, Peninsula Arms Hotel and The Brass Monkey.

== Track listing ==
1. "Don't Need Love" – 3:39
2. "She Won't Need Words" – 3:33
3. "Everybody's Talkin'" (Fred Neil) – 2:41
4. "Would I Want You" (Diesel/Krista Polvere) – 2:56
5. "Tip Of My Tongue" (Diesel/Danny Tate) – 5:54
6. "One More Time" (Diesel/Jerry Williams) – 4:37
7. "Soul Revival" – 4:42
8. "15 Feet of Snow" – 5:25
9. "Come Around" – 3:15
10. "All Come Together" (Diesel/Guy Davies) – 4:57
11. "Darling of the Universe" – 3:51
12. "Come To Me" – 7:14
13. "Faith & Gasoline" – 3:56
14. "Cry in Shame" – 6:57

All tracks written by Diesel except where noted.

All instruments by Diesel except drums in "Everybody's Talkin'" (Lee Moloney)

== Weekly charts ==
Chart (2004)	Peak position
Australia (ARIA)	78
