= Harem Scarem (Australian band) =

Australian blues rock band

- Origin: Melbourne, Victoria, Australia
- Genre: Blues rock
- Years active: 1982–1989
- Labels: Au Go Go, Citadel
- Past members: Charles Marshall; Christopher Marshall; Philip Wales; Clifford Booth; Glen Sheldon; Kurt Linotner; David Moll; Peter Jones; Barry Palmer; Chris Wilson; Peter Hall; Jex Saarelaht

Harem Scarem were an Australian blues rock group which formed in 1982. They issued two studio albums, Pilgrim's Progress on Au Go Go Records (1986) and Lo & Behold on Citadel Records (1988) before disbanding in 1989. The early line-up was fronted by Christopher Marshall on lead vocals and included his brother, Charlie Marshall first on bass guitar, then rhythm guitar and, when fronting the group from 1987, was also on lead vocals. By September 1985 they had been joined by Peter Jones on drums and percussion; Barry Palmer on lead guitar; Glen Sheldon first on rhythm guitar and then on bass guitar; and Chris Wilson on harmonica and saxophone. Australian musicologist, Ian McFarlane, felt that "Few alternative bands of the day could ever hope to match that line-up for muscular bravado and sheer instrumental firepower". On 18 May 2012 Peter Jones died of brain cancer, aged 45.

== History ==
Harem Scarem were formed in Melbourne in 1982 as a blues rock group by Christopher Roy Marshall on lead vocals, his brother Charlie Marshall on bass guitar, and Philip Wales on guitar. Early in the following year Clifford Booth joined on drums and Glen Robert Sheldon was on rhythm guitar. Christopher Marshall, Sheldon and Wales were former school friends. Harem Scarem's first gig was in February. They signed with local label, Au Go Go Records, which issued their track, "Love Attraction", on a various artists' compilation, Asleep at the Wheel (1983). Soon after the line-up was expanded by Kurt Hans Linotner on harmonica and David John Moll replaced Wales on lead guitar.

Late in 1984 Harem Scarem released their debut 12" vinyl five-track extended play, Dogman, on Au Go Go, which featured "Fever Rock". It was recorded at John Cook's Studio, Melbourne in October with engineer-producer, John Archer (bass guitarist of Hunters & Collectors). Australian musicologist, Ian McFarlane, described "Fever Rock" as "epic" and one of "the band's stage favourites", which was issued as a gig give-away 7" single.

In February 1985 Peter Jones (ex-Vince Jones Band, no relation) replaced Booth on drums. In September that year the group were reorganised with Moll replaced by Barry Palmer on lead guitar; Linotner replaced by Chris Wilson on harmonica and saxophone (both ex-Sole Twisters); and Sheldon and Charlie Marshall swapped their instruments. McFarlane described the new ensemble: "Few alternative bands of the day could ever hope to match that line-up for muscular bravado and sheer instrumental firepower".

Harem Scarem's debut studio album, Pilgrim's Progress, appeared on Au Go Go in December 1986. It was recorded with Archer as engineer-producer again, but at Herzog Studios in Elwood and The Esplanade Hotel in St Kilda. McFarlane noted that it was a "classic" which had received "great critical acclaim". Trevor Block of Mess+Noise described the re-issue version from 2008 as a "steaming chunk of urban blues from the Yarra delta". Jarrod Watt of ABC Ballarat opined that the remastering had "taken a dusty, much-loved relic and polished the sound to 21st century standards of fidelity and clarity".

Pilgrim's Progress provided two singles, "Hard Rain" (September 1986) and "Miracle Mile" (June 1987), while their cover version of Iggy Pop and The Stooges' "Open Up and Bleed" also appeared on Au Go Go's tribute album to that group, Hard to Beat (1988). In May 1987 Wilson left to start his solo career and, in December, Christopher Marshall left to attend an Art History course at a university. His brother, Charlie took over lead vocals and fronted the group. By 1988 their sound was "tough, lean rock'n'roll" and in May Peter Hall (ex-Head Undone) replaced Sheldon on bass guitar. By that time Palmer had been recruited to join Hunters & Collectors on guitar – alongside Archer – while still a member of Harem Scarem.

The group signed with Sydney-based label, Citadel Records, to issue their second studio album, Lo & Behold, in December 1988. It was engineered-produced by Chris Thompson (the Wreckery). By the time the album had appeared Jex Saarelaht had joined on piano (ex-Kate Ceberano and Her Septet alongside Peter Jones). Jeannie Zakharov of The Canberra Times previewed their February 1989 gig where the band "will get a little help from its friends in the form of the horn section from Hunters and Collectors". She gave a brief history: "[they] started out playing Velvet Underground songs, went through a blues period then moved toward rock and roll with its various line-up changes, has got good reviews for its new album, Lo and Behold, and single 'Long Time Between Drinks'".

The group disbanded late in 1989 with McFarlane noting they "became a veritable institution on the Melbourne inner-city scene. In the early days, [they] played raucous, swampy blues rock fleshed out by wild Stooges guitar riffs. Frontman Christopher Marshall was capable of taking his dynamic voice from a guttural roar to a breathy whisper, and back to an anguished howl in the space of one phrase. Later on, the band tempered the manic riffs somewhat to arrive at an innovative brand of rock".

=== Afterwards ===
After leaving Harem Scarem, Christopher Marshall eventually formed the Christopher Marshall Band in 1997 with Palmer on lead guitar; Stephen Cummings on rhythm guitar and vocals (ex-The Sports, solo); Mark Ferrie on bass guitar (ex-Models); and John Watson on drums (ex-Australian Crawl). In September they issued an EP, Kiss Me Ether. Marshall toured with his group renamed Christopher Marshall and His Wildest Dreams and, in May 1998, released his debut solo album, Strange Waters, Small Mercies. His backing band were Cummings, Ferrie, Palmer and Watson with Dan Knight on keyboards. For the album Charlie supplied backing vocals. A second album, Story of Us, appeared in 2002.

In the early 1990s Charlie Marshall and the Body Electric were formed with Charlie on lead vocals and rhythm guitar; Terry Bartholomew on drums; Lindsay Brunsdon on lead guitar (ex-Ku Klux Frankenstein, Fire), Matt Heydon on keyboards; and Stuart Speed on bass guitar. In November 1994 Charlie used the line-up of Brian Hooper on bass guitar (from Kim Salmon and the Surrealists and Beasts of Bourbon); Warren Ellis on violin; and Jim White on drums; (both from Dirty Three) to record his debut EP, Charlie Marshall and the Body Electric. They also issued a studio album, I Don't Want It in 1995. With a new line-up which included Cam Butler on guitar; and Chris Chapple on bass guitar; Charlie Marshall and the Body Electric issued another EP in July 1999, Making My Way to You.

Peter Jones worked in various groups including Crown of Thorns (1988–89, 1991) alongside Chris Wilson and Palmer. Jones' other groups include Crowded House (1994–96); and then he founded deadstar (1995–2001) with Palmer. Palmer had continued with Hunters & Collectors until 1998 and in deadstar until 2001. Since 1996 Palmer has also worked as a record producer. Aside from his solo career, Wilson was a session musician for various acts including: Paul Kelly & the Coloured Girls, Hunters & Collectors, and Crowded House. With Palmer he was a founding member of the short-lived group, Pub Dogs (1991–92), which issued an EP, Scatter's Liver.

From 1999 Jones was a school teacher, he was diagnosed with brain cancer in 2011 and on 18 May 2012 he died of the disease, aged 45.

IN January 2019, Wilson died of pancreatic cancer.

== Members ==
- Charlie Marshall – bass guitar, rhythm guitar, lead vocals (1982–89)
- Christopher Marshall – lead vocals (1982–87)
- Philip Wales – lead guitar (1982–83)
- Clifford Booth – drums (1983–85)
- Glen Sheldon – rhythm guitar, bass guitar (1983–88)
- Kurt Linotner – harmonica (1983–85)
- David Moll – lead guitar (1983–85)
- Peter Jones – drums (1985–89)
- Barry Palmer – lead guitar (1985–89)
- Chris Wilson – harmonica, saxophone (1985–87)
- Peter Hall – bass guitar (1988–89)
- Jex Saarelaht – piano (1988–89)

== Discography ==
=== Albums ===
- Pilgrim's Progress (December 1986) Au Go Go Records (ANDA 55)
- Lo & Behold (December 1988) Citadel Records (CITLP522)

=== Extended plays ===
- Dogman (1984) Au Go Go Records
- Harem Scarem (1987) Au Go Go Records

=== Singles ===
- "Fever Rock" (1985)
- "Figure Head" (1985)
- "Hard Rain" (1986)
- "Miracle Mile" (1987)
- "Long Time Between Drinks" (1988)
- "Rub Me" (1989)
