= Under the Influence (Diesel album) =

Studio album by Diesel
- Released: 4 July 2011
- Recorded: June 2010 @ Blackfoot Sound
- Genre: Blues music
- Label: Liberation Records
- Producer: Diesel, David Nicholas

Diesel chronology
Greatest Hits Live (2011)	Under the Influence (2011)	You Get There From Here (2012)

"Under the Influence" is the eleventh studio album by Australian musician, Diesel. The release came about following a string of live dates, in which Diesel performed tracks that had influenced his own material. The album follows the extended play.7 Axes which was released in February 2011 and peaked at number 71. Both EP and album were recorded in ten days in June 2010.

== Reviews ==
Pete Rivas from The Music gave the album 8 out of 10 saying "With this album, Diesel celebrates 25 years on the scene and he honors some of the key influences in his music, hence the title. Featuring 15 tracks in total, the album includes mostly covers, although these are well fused with 3 fantastic original Diesel instrumentals (Thang 4, Thang 5, Thang 6). Stand out cover tracks include The Sonics' “Have Love, Will Travel” which includes a cameo from Jimmy Barnes and my personal favorite, Neil Young's “Cinnamon Girl”. Other pleasers are “Caladonia” and “Reconsider Baby”. "

== Track listing ==
1. "Spanish Castle Magic" (Jimi Hendrix) - 3:08
2. "Cross Cut Saw" (R.G. Ford) - 3:10
3. "I'm a Ram" (Big Sugar) - 3:43
4. "Have Love, Will Travel" (feat. Jimmy Barnes) (Richard Berry) - 2:35
5. "Thang 5" (instrumental) - 2:54
6. "Can't Get Next To You" (Norman Whitfield, Barrett Strong) - 4:04
7. "Cinnamon Girl" (Neil Young) - 3:13
8. "Thang 4" (instrumental) - 3:05
9. "Wind Cries Mary" (Jimi Hendrix) - 3:58
10. "Going Down" (Don Nix) - 3:34
11. "Reconsider Baby" (Lowell Fulson) - 3:18
12. "It's All in the Game" (Carl Sigman, Charles Dawes) - 4:02
13. "Caladonia" (Fleecy Moore) - 3:38
14. "Rumble" (Fred Wray / Milton Grant) - 2:23
15. "Thang 6" (instrumental) - 2:59

=== Weekly charts ===
Chart (2011)	Peak position
Australia (ARIA)	57
Australian Artist (ARIA)	9

== Release history ==
Region	Date	Format(s)	Label	Catalogue
Australia	4 July 2011	Digital download / Compact Disc	Liberation Records	LMCD0130

== Credits ==
- Bass – Richie Vez
- Drums – Lee Moloney
- Guitar/Vocals – Mark Lizotte
