= Soul Lost Companion =

Studio album by Mark Lizotte
- Released: September 1999
- Recorded: 1999
- Studios: Record Plant (Sausalito); Sorcerer Sound (New York); Looking Glass (New York); Roundhead (Auckland, New Zealand)
- Genre: Rock
- Length: 47:53
- Labels: Mammoth; Festival Mushroom
- Producers: Jerry Harrison; Gavin MacKillop

Mark Lizotte chronology
Rewind – The Best Of (1996)	Soul Lost Companion (1999)	Hear (2002)

Singles from Soul Lost Companion
- 1. "Dig" Released: August 1999; 2. "Satellite" Released: November 1999

Soul Lost Companion is the sixth studio album by Australian rock singer-songwriter, Mark Lizotte, and issued under his birth name. Otherwise he generally uses his stage names, Diesel, Johnny Diesel or Johnny Diesel and the Injectors. It appeared in September 1999, which peaked at No. 18 on the ARIA Albums Chart. It provided two singles, "Dig" (August 1999) and "Satellite" (November). Lizotte toured Australia from August to December promoting the album, sharing stages with Taxiride.

== Background and release ==
In 1996, after helping produce and write some tracks on Vika and Linda Bull's album Princess Tabu, and the release of his albums, Short Cool Ones and Rewind – The Best Of, Diesel relocated with his family to New York City at the end of that year. In 1998 signed a new deal with Mammoth Records and decided to re-emerge under his birth name, Mark Lizotte. In November 1998 Lizotte was back in Australia and appeared at the Concert of the Century for Mushroom Record's 25th anniversary where he joined Chris Wilson and Jimmy Barnes on stage.

Lizotte worked with Talking Heads' Jerry Harrison and with Gavin MacKillop to produce most of his new material. Soul Lost Companion appeared in September 1999, which peaked at No. 18 on the ARIA Albums Chart. It provided two singles, "Dig" (August 1999) and "Satellite" (November). Lizotte toured Australia from August to December promoting the album and singles, sharing stages with Taxiride.

== Review ==
Russell Baillie from the NZ Herald gave the album 3 out of 5 saying; "The Aussie soul-rocker formerly known as Diesel has dropped the moniker for the first album of the Stateside part of his career, and come over a bit singer-songwriterly and serious. This makes for a solid album which runs a line between the guitar and voice anthemics of Radiohead and U2, a delve towards Crowded House with occasional reversion to his soul-rock stylings. It suffers from being over-produced but shows much proof of Lizotte's jack-of-all-trades talent and old fans should adjust easily."

== Track listing ==
All tracks written by Mark Lizotte, except as shown.

1. "Soul Lost Companion" (Lizotte, Marc Swersky) – 5:28
2. "Satellite" (Lizotte, Dave Derby) – 3:46
3. "Dig" (Lizotte, Guy Davies) – 4:52
4. "Beautiful Machine" – 4:52
5. "Don't Look Twice" – 3:45
6. "Come Down" (Lizotte, Marc Swersky) – 3:01
7. "Burning Water" (Lizotte, Neil Finn) – 4:53
8. "Lotion" – 5:14
9. "When It Rains" – 3:52
10. "Monochrome" – 4:25
11. "Darling of the Universe" – 4:17

== Personnel ==
Musicians

- Mark Lizotte – lead vocals, backing vocals, guitars, bass guitar
- Guy Davies – keyboards, programming, guitar (track 3)
- Prairie Prince – drums

Additional musicians

- Eliza-Jane Barnes – backing vocals (track 2)
- Mahalia Barnes – backing vocals (track 2)
- Danielle Degruttola – cello (track 4)
- Neil Finn – organ and backing vocals (track 7)
- Jerry Harrison – piano (track 1), synthesiser (track 7)
- Lisa Hunt – backing vocals (track 6)
- Rachel Ioshak – backing vocals (track 2)
- Kevin March – drums (tracks 2, 5)
- Michael P. Mossman – trumpet and flugelhorn (track 10)
- Tracy Scott Silverman – violin and viola (track4)
- Mary Wooten – cello (track 2)
- Bernie Worrell – synthesiser (track 4)
- Garo Yellin – cello (tracks 9, 10)

Recording details

- Producer – Jerry Harrison (tracks 1,3,4,7,8,11), Gavin MacKillop (tracks 2,5,6,7,9,10). Venues: Plant Studios, Sausalito, CA; Sorcerer Sound, NYC, NY; Looking Glass, NYC, NY; Roundhead Studios, Auckland, NZ
  - Additional production – Mark Lizotte, Doug McKean (track 2)
  - Additional production – Neil Finn, Sam Gibson (track 7)
- Mixer – Tom Lord-Alge (all tracks except following), Jack Joseph Puig (track 6), Terry Manning (track 8), Doug McKean (track 2). Venues: South Beach Studios, Miami, FL; Ocean Way Recording, Hollywood, CA; Compass Point Studios, Bahamas; Sear Sound, NYC, NY; RPM Sound Studio, NYC, NY
- Mastering – Ted Jensen at Sterling Sound, NYC, NY
