= Cactus Child =

Australian folk pop group

- Origin: Sydney, New South Wales, Australia
- Genres: Folk; pop
- Years active: 1993–1998
- Labels: Republic; Focus/Shock; Grudge/Universal/BMG
- Past members: Gemma Deacon; Angus Diggs; Chris Miller; Ian Housten-Shadwell; Joe Guiseppe-Accaria; Jan Sebastian; Carolyn Shine

Cactus Child were an Australian folk, pop group formed in 1993 by mainstays, Gemma Deacon on lead vocals and Ian Housten-Shadwell on guitar. They issued two studio albums, Diaphones (February 1996) and Earthgirl (July 1998), before disbanding in November 1998.

== History ==
Cactus Child were formed in 1993 in Sydney as a folk, pop band by Gemma Deacon on lead vocals, Angus Diggs on drums, Chris Miller on bass guitar and Ian Housten-Shadwell on guitar. In January 1994 Deacon and Housten-Shadwell were joined by Joe Giuseppe-Accaria on drums, percussion and marimba; and Jan Sebastian on percussion. This line-up recorded a six-track extended play, On, for Regular Records, which was issued in September of that year.

During 1996 Cactus Child were the support act for Lisa Loeb, Ronnie Jordan, Jeff Buckley and Luka Bloom. In February 1996 they released their debut album, Diaphones, on Focus Records/Shock Records with Craig Porteils as producer. By October of that year the line-up of Deacon, Housten-Shadwell, Miller, Accaria and Sebastian were periodically supplemented by Maria Pavela on backing vocals and Natasha Ramirez on violin.

The group were signed to Grudge/Universal/BMG, to reissue Diaphones in 1997. Nathan of Channel [V] described the title track, "a slow finger-picking ballad with no drums at all – instead a cello and piano providing ample backing to a beautiful song." A track, "Fall", was re-recorded as "Fall '97", which was released as the album's lead single in March. Nathan observed, "you can tell that they've put a bit of thought into production and added bits here and there to make it more accessible for radio; and in doing so I'd tip this one to be the next song for them to push. A beautiful ballad complete with strings, percussion and of course Gemma Deacon's remarkable voice." By that time Carolyn Shine had joined on keyboards and vocals.

In June 1998 the group issued another single, "On the Money", ahead of their second album, Earthgirl (July 1998). Australian musicologist, Ian McFarlane, felt "[it] featured pristine folksy pop, with lush arrangements, strings, piano, harmonies and acoustic guitar." Christie Eliezer of Australian Musician observed, "[it] has some interesting guitar work, not just in its use of open tunings but the acoustic sounds in general. For example Ian spent hours on layering 'Juliette' which uses multi-tracks for an exciting effect." They followed with another single, "Long Way" (September), but broke up in November 1998.

Shadwell published a novel, Slush Pile, in June 2014. In the following August, Australian Broadcasting Corporation's Radio National aired, Ian Shadwell's Slush Pile: a satirical novel of literature, fame and trivia nights. The work was described by the program's Kate Evans and Michael Cathcart as, "he's taken that experience [with Cactus Child] of fame and its discontents to write a very funny story of a fictional Australian writer who won the Booker Prize and then had 14 years of writers' block." Angela Meyer of The Australian observed, "[it's] a rollicking black comedy with an entertainingly unlikable main character. As this selfish, pleasure-seeking, pompous and arrogant man digs a hole for himself, due to the conviction that he is entitled to everything he imagines he could have, the reader both cringes and eggs him on, to see just how far he will go."

== Members ==
- Gemma Deacon – lead vocals
- Angus Diggs – drums
- Chris Miller – electric and double bass guitar, string arrangements
- Ian Housten-Shadwell – guitar
- Joe Giuseppe-Accaria – drums, percussion, marimba
- Jan Sebastian – percussion
- Maria Pavela – backing vocals
- Natasha Ramirez – violin
- Carolyn Shine – keyboards, backing vocals

== Discography ==
=== Albums ===
List of albums, with selected chart positions
Title	Album details	Peak chart positions
Title	Album details	AUS
Diaphones	Released: February 1996; Label: Shock (AJCDAUST007); Format: CD, CD	129
Earthgirl	Released: July 1988; Label: Grudge (UMD73099); Format: CD, CD	166

=== Extended plays ===
List of EPs, with selected details
Title	Details
On	Released: September 1994; Label: Republic Records

=== Singles ===
List of singles, with selected chart positions
Title	Year	Chart positions
Title	Year	AUS
"Fall"	1997	195
"On the Money"	1998	—
"Long Way"	1998	—
