= 7 Axes =

EP by Diesel
- Released: 4 February 2011
- Recorded: June 2010, Blackfoot Sound
- Genres: Rock music; Pop music; Blues music
- Length: 19:32
- Label: Liberation Records

Diesel chronology
iTunes Live From Sydney: Aussie Legends EP (2009)	7 Axes (2011)	Greatest Hits Live (2011)

Singles from 7 Axes
- 1. "Have Love, Will Travel" Released: January 2011

7 Axes is an extended play (EP) (or Mini-LP) by Australian singer songwriter Diesel. It was released in February 2011 and sees Diesel paying homage to the artists and musicians that have inspired him. The EP follows a national tour which Diesel completed in November 2010. Diesel toured this EP in March and April 2011.

"Have Love, Will Travel" was released as the first and only single from the album on 4 January 2011.

== Background and recording ==
"It all stemmed from my live shows" Diesel said. He was doing shows in Sydney and Melbourne and performing covers; "Liberation Records heard about it and said, 'you've got to make a record like that'. So we have!" Diesel and his band recorded 18 songs live in the studio in 8 days. 6 of these appear on the 7 Axes EP.

== Reviews ==
Rod Whitfield from Beat Magazine said the EP was "standard" saying "[Diesel] does [the covers] well, with both his voice and guitar playing predictably shining through. Does he make them his own? No. That's the problem."

== Track listing ==
- Digital download/ Compact Disc
1. "Cinnamon Girl" (Neil Young) - 3:12
2. "Cross Cut Saw" (R.G. Ford) - 3:10
3. "Have Love, Will Travel" (Richard Berry) - 2:36
4. "Stone Free" (Jimi Hendrix) - 3:47
5. "Satisfaction" (Keith Richards, Mick Jagger) - 2:34
6. "Come On (Let The Good Times Roll)" (Earl King) - 4:13

== Weekly charts ==
Chart (2011)	Peak position
Australia (ARIA)	71
Australian Artist (ARIA)	18

== Release history ==
Region	Date	Format(s)	Label	Catalogue
Australia	4 February 2011	Digital download / Compact Disc	Liberation Records	LMCD0129
