= Ford v Ferrari (soundtrack) =

2019 soundtrack album

Ford v Ferrari (titled Le Mans '66 in some European countries) is a 2019 sports action drama film directed by James Mangold and distributed by 20th Century Fox. Two soundtrack albums for the film were released by Hollywood Records on November 15, 2019.

== Ford v Ferrari: Original Motion Picture Soundtrack ==
Ford v Ferrari: Original Motion Picture Soundtrack

Soundtrack album by Various artists
- Released: November 15, 2019
- Genre: Film score; rock and roll; rhythm and blues
- Length: 39:44
- Label: Hollywood

Ford v Ferrari: Original Motion Picture Soundtrack is the official soundtrack of Ford v Ferrari, released on November 15, 2019. The album consists of classic 1950s and 1960s music along with three score tracks by Marco Beltrami and Buck Sanders.

=== Track listing ===
No.	Title	Writer(s)	Artist(s)	Length
1.	"Polk Salad Annie"	Tony Joe White	James Burton	3:26
2.	"Money (That's What I Want)"	Janie Bradford; Berry Gordy	The Kingsmen	2:19
3.	"Have Love, Will Travel"	Richard Berry	The Sonics	2:38
4.	"I Put a Spell on You"	Jay Hawkins; Herb Slotkin	Nina Simone	2:36
5.	"Pour Une Fille Comme Toi"	Jerry Lordan; Raymond Mamoudy	Lucky Blondo	2:34
6.	"Love's Gonna Live Here"	Buck Owens	Buck Owens	2:00
7.	"Stranger in a Strange Land"	David Crosby	The Byrds	3:05
8.	"Le Mans 66"	Marco Beltrami; Buck Sanders	Marco Beltrami and Buck Sanders	5:41
9.	"Team Player"	Beltrami; Sanders	Marco Beltrami and Buck Sanders	3:17
10.	"Crescent Wrench"	Beltrami; Sanders	Marco Beltrami and Buck Sanders	1:35
11.	"Ace of Spades"	Francis Lincon Wray Jr.; Milton Grant	Link Wray	2:18
12.	"Dark Side"	James Alan Sohns; Warren Rodgers	The Shadows of Knight	2:02
13.	"Hipsville 29 B.C. (I Need Help)"	Don Turnbow	The Sparkles	2:12
14.	"Flying Saucers Rock N Roll"	Ray Scott	Billy Riley and His Little Green Men	2:04
15.	"Shooting Star"	Les Baxter	Les Baxter	1:57
Total length:				39:44

== Ford v Ferrari: Original Score ==
Ford v Ferrari: Original Score

Soundtrack album by Marco Beltrami and Buck Sanders
- Released: November 15, 2019
- Recorded: 2019
- Genre: Film score
- Length: 39:28
- Label: Hollywood
- Producer: Marco Beltrami; Buck Sanders

Ford v Ferrari: Original Score is the soundtrack score to the film composed by Marco Beltrami and Buck Sanders, released on November 15, 2019, exclusively on Amazon Music and music streaming services.

=== Track listing ===
No.	Title	Length
1.	"Le Mans 66"	5:42
2.	"Wide View"	1:35
3.	"Driving in the Rain"	1:52
4.	"Henry Ford the Second"	0:44
5.	"Ferrari Factory"	1:35
6.	"Iacocca's Idea"	0:59
7.	"Photos to Fiat"	1:10
8.	"7000 RPM"	1:28
9.	"Willow Sprints"	1:19
10.	"Henry Ford's Revenge"	1:00
11.	"Thirty Minutes"	0:51
12.	"Miles Is Not a Ford Man"	1:08
13.	"Walk the Track"	1:57
14.	"Chasing Bandini"	3:14
15.	"Night Driving"	2:57
16.	"Miles Did It"	1:11
17.	"The Request / The Car Is Yours / Perfect Lap"	4:36
18.	"Team Player"	3:20
19.	"Crescent Wrench – Edit"	1:47
20.	"Le Mans 59"	1:33
Total length:		39:28
