= Live at the Continental =

- 1994 release

Live album by Chris Wilson
- Released: September 1994
- Recorded: 20 May 1994
- Venue: Continental Cafe, Prahran, Victoria
- Label: Aurora, Mushroom

Chris Wilson chronology
Landlocked (1992)	Live at the Continental (1994)	Short Cool Ones (1996)

Live at the Continental is a 1995 live album by Australian musician Chris Wilson. The album was released in September 1994. At the ARIA Music Awards of 1995, the album was nominated for Best Male Artist.

The album was re-released in January 2021 and on vinyl for the first time, where it peaked at number 19 on the ARIA charts.

== Track listings ==
Original release
No.	Title	Writer(s)	Length
1.	"You Will Surely Love Again"	Chris Wilson	4:50
2.	"Wolves"	Wilson	6:00
3.	"Face in the Mirror"	Wilson, Barbara Waters, Barry Palmer, Chris Rogers, Peter Jones	6:04
4.	"The Changeling"	Wilson, Palmer, Rogers, Jones	4:47
5.	"Rose Tattoo"	Wilson	5:56
6.	"It Takes a Lot to Laugh, It Takes a Train to Cry"	Bob Dylan	6:13
7.	"The Sky Is Crying"	Elmore James	6:53
8.	"Landlocked"	Wilson	4:39
9.	"Hymn"	Wilson, Walters, Palmer, Rogers, Jones	13:25

2007 bonus disc
No.	Title	Writer(s)	Length
1.	"Alimony Blues"	Chris Wilson	3:28
2.	"Building Fires"	Dan Penn, Jim Dickson, Johnny Christopher	4:56
3.	"A Mess of Blues"	Doc Pomus, Mort Shuman	3:39
4.	"Tits and Feathers"	Wilson	4:16
5.	"Turpentine"	Wilson	2:49
6.	"Wreckage"	Wilson	4:47

=== 2021 release ===
2021 release (CD1/LP1)
No.	Title	Writer(s)	Length
1.	"You Will Surely Love Again"	Wilson	4:50
2.	"Wolves"	Wilson	6:00
3.	"Face in the Mirror"	Wilson, Waters, Palmer, Rogers, Jones	6:04
4.	"The Changeling"	Wilson, Palmer, Rogers, Jones	4:47
5.	"Rose Tattoo"	Wilson	5:56
6.	"It Takes a Lot to Laugh, It Takes a Train to Cry"	Bob Dylan	6:13
7.	"The Sky Is Crying"	Elmore James	6:53
8.	"Landlocked"	Wilson	4:39

2021 release (CD2/LP2)
No.	Title	Writer(s)	Length
1.	"Alimony Blues"	Chris Wilson	3:28
2.	"Building Fires"	Penn, Dickson, Christopher	4:56
3.	"A Mess of Blues"	Doc Pomus, Mort Shuman	3:39
4.	"Tits and Feathers"	Wilson	4:16
5.	"Turpentine"	Wilson	2:49
6.	"Wreckage"	Wilson	4:47
7.	"Mystery Train"	Junior Parker, Sam Phillips	3:20
8.	"Mystery Train Part II"	Parker, Phillips	3:39
9.	"Hymn"	Wilson, Walters, Palmer, Rogers, Jones	13:24

== Charts ==
=== Weekly charts ===
Chart (2021)	Peak position
Australian Albums (ARIA)	19

=== Year-end charts ===
Chart (2021)	Position
Australian Jazz and Blues Albums (ARIA)	20

== Release history ==
Region	Date	Format	Label	Catalogue
Australia	October 1994	CD, Cassette	Aurora, Mushroom	D19852
Australia	June 2007	2xCD	Forge Records	No. 002 / 003
Australia	22 January 2021	2xCD, 2xLP	Cheersquad Records & Tapes	CRT034
