= The Essential Diesel =

The Essential

Greatest hits album by Diesel
- Released: February 2009
- Recorded: 1988–1992
- Genre: Soft rock, blues, pop rock
- Label: EMI

Diesel chronology
Days Like These (2008)	The Essential (2009)	Project Blues: Saturday Suffering Fools (2009)

"The Essential" is a budget greatest hits album by Australian rock musician Diesel. The album was released in February 2009. It includes tracks from Diesel's first two albums; Johnny Diesel and The Injectors (1989) and Hepfidelity (1992).

== Track listing ==
CD/DD (2430722)

1. "Cry in Shame" – 4:46
2. "Parisienne Hotel" – 4:04
3. "Come to Me" (UK Remix) – 4:23
4. "Tip of My Tongue" – 4:12
5. "Don't Need Love" – 4:13
6. "Man Alive" – 4:51
7. "Since I Fell for You" – 5:38
8. "One More Time" – 4:03
9. "Please Send Me Someone to Love" – 4:23
10. "Lookin' for Love" – 3:30
11. "Love Junk" – 3:46
12. "Soul Revival" – 4:05
