= Last Shower =

EP by Tim Chaisson and Diesel
- Released: 11 October 2013
- Studio: Studios 301 (Sydney)
- Genre: Indie pop; Indie rock; Country music
- Label: Bumstead Productions/ ABC Music / Universal Music Australia

Tim Chaisson chronology
The Other Side (2012)	Last Shower (2013)	Lost in Light (2015)

Johnny Diesel chronology
Let it Fly (2013)	Last Shower (2013)	Americana (2016)

Last Shower is a collaborative extended play (EP) by Canadian singer songwriter Tim Chaisson and Australian singer songwriter Diesel. A music video for the track "Last Shower" was released on 10 October 2013. Chaisson and Diesel toured the EP throughout Australia in October and November 2013.

== Reviews ==
Josh Dixon of Renowned for Sound gave the EP 4 stars out of 5 saying "The first thing you’ll notice with "Last Shower"... is that it combines the best elements of Chaisson’s voice and Diesel’s musicality to make for a unique collaboration. The song has a western tinge to it, but is firmly rooted in acoustic rock stylings. It’s easy to listen to, and catchy enough that you’ll want to listen to it again." adding "It’s true that the music here could be deemed as generic, but the individual talents of the two singers are on display and make up for any shortcomings. Chaisson and Diesel both have impressive voices, and the harmonies on Last Shower make this perfectly known."

== Track listing ==
- Digital download/ Compact Disc
1. "Last Shower" (3:38)
2. "Tip of My Tongue" (4:28)
3. "Speak Easier" (3:28)
4. "Wildflowers" (3:05)

== Release history ==
Region	Date	Format(s)	Label
Australia	11 October 2013	Digital download	Bumstead Productions/ ABC Music
Australia	18 October 2013	Compact Disc	Universal Music Australia
