= Alone with Blues =

Studio album by Diesel
- Released: 16 July 2021
- Recorded: 2020–2021
- Label: Bloodlines; UMA
- Producer: Mark Lizotte

Diesel chronology
| Sunset Suburbia (2020) | Alone with Blues (2021) | Bootleg Melancholy (2023) |

Singles from Alone with Blues
- 1. "Six Steel Strings" Released: 19 May 2021; 2. "Lost and Lookin'" Released: 18 June 2021

Alone with Blues is the fifteenth studio album by Australian rock musician, Diesel. The album was announced in May 2021, alongside the release of the single "Six Steel Strings", and was released on 16 July 2021. the album was supported with the Greatest Hits & Alone With Blues Tour. The album was recorded during the 2020 COVID-19 lockdown in Australia and Diesel played every instrument on the album.

== Singles ==
- "Six Steel Strings" was released on 19 May 2021 as the album's lead single. The song was written 30 years ago by Diesel and Ross Wilson. Diesel said "It was 1991, I think Ross saw me as a young bluesman in a long tradition. He asked about my background and put details into the lyrics, a tongue-in-cheek take on my life story in demo form that we knocked up together in an hour. It was only rediscovered when he moved house last year, and the timing couldn't have been better because it's such a perfect fit."
- "Lost and Lookin'" was released on 18 June 2021 as the second single. A song originally performed and made famous by Sam Cooke. Diesel said he heard the song "a couple of years ago" and was "mesmerised" by it.

== Reception ==
Mark Diggins from The Rock Pit said "This is a wonderfully clean Blues album, precise and purposeful and it sets the standards in wonderful stead, it's eschewed the gritty feel of the originals and instead taken a look under the hood, seen what makes the tick, polished them up and delivered them with fresh eyes and ears… And it works beautifully."

Jeff Jenkins from Stack Mazaine said "Here [Diesel] celebrates some of his heroes... What could have been an unnecessary indulgence is instead fun and inclusive, with Diesel delivering short, sharp takes on his favourite blues songs."

== Track listing ==
1. "I'm Satisfied" (Mississippi John Hurt) – 2:34
2. "Shame, Shame, Shame" (Jimmy Reed) – 2:58
3. "Lost and Lookin'" (James Woodie Alexander II, Lowell Jordan) – 2:06
4. "Hoochie Coochie Man" (Willie Dixon) – 3:15
5. "I Can't Quit You Baby" (Dixon) – 4:02
6. "Boogie Chillen'" (John Lee Hooker, Bernard Bessmen) – 2:26
7. "Six Steel Strings" (Lizotte, Ross Wilson) – 3:26
8. "All Your Love (Otis Rush)" – 2:56
9. "Work Song" (Nat Adderley) – 2:25
10. "Mirror Blues" (Lizotte, Marc Swersky) – 3:39
11. "Where Did You Sleep Last Night?" (trad. arranged by Lizotte) – 2:23

== Charts ==
Chart performance for Alone with Blues
| Chart (2021) | Peak position |
|---|---|
| Australian Albums (ARIA) | 20 |
| Australian Blues & Roots Airplay Chart | 1 |

== Release history ==
| Region | Date | Format(s) | Label | Catalogue |
|---|---|---|---|---|
| Australia | 16 July 2021 | CD, digital download, streaming, limited-edition LP | Bloodlines / UMA | BLOOD89 |
