= Solid State Rhyme =

Studio album by Diesel
- Released: November 28, 1994
- Recorded: May−August 1994
- Studio: Studios 301 (Sydney)
- Genre: Pop rock, blues rock
- Length: 47:53
- Label: EMI
- Producer: Diesel and Craig Porteils

Diesel chronology
The Lobbyist (1992)	Solid State Rhyme (1994)	Short Cool Ones (1996)

Singles from Solid State Rhyme
- 1. "All Come Together" Released: October 1994; 2. "15 Feet of Snow" Released: February 1995; 3. "Get it On" Released: June 1995

Solid State Rhyme is the fourth studio album by Australian singer-songwriter Diesel, released in November 1994. It peaked at number 10 on the ARIA Charts. The album was certified gold in Australia.

"All Come Together", "15 Feet of Snow" and "Get it On" were released as singles.

== Track listing ==
1. Chill Pill - 2:14
2. Get it On - 3:03
3. Love Again - 3:13
4. All Come Together (Diesel/Davies) - 4:48
5. You - 3:00
6. Sacred Cow - 4:10
7. Make It Right - 4:43
8. Still Thinking About Your Love - 3:08
9. 15 Feet of Snow - 5:17
10. Come If You Dare - 3:40
11. Bad Seed - 4:35
12. Blur - 4:31
13. Time - 4:54
- All tracks written by Diesel except where stated.

== Charts ==
=== Weekly charts ===
Chart (1994–95)	Peak position
Australian Albums (ARIA)	10

=== Year-end charts ===
Chart (1994)	Position
Australian Albums (ARIA)	69

=== Certifications ===
Region	Certification	Certified units/sales
Australia (ARIA)	Gold	35,000^{^}
^{^} Shipments figures based on certification alone.
