= Have Love, Will Travel =

Single by Richard Berry
- B-side: "No Room"
- Released: January 1960
- Genre: Rhythm and blues
- Length: 2:35
- Label: Flip 349
- Songwriter: Richard Berry

Richard Berry singles chronology
| "Besame Mucho" (1958) | "Have Love, Will Travel" (1960) | "I’ll Never, Ever Love Again" (1960) |

"Have Love, Will Travel" is a 1959 song written and recorded by Richard Berry. While the song may have been recorded before the end of 1959, the correct release date appears to be January, 1960. The title is based on a popular television/radio western serial Have Gun, Will Travel.

== The Sonics version ==
In its best known incarnation, garage rock/proto-punk band The Sonics included a "typically intense" version of the song on their 1965 album, Here Are The Sonics. Driven by a riff doubled on guitar, sax and bass, a big driving drum sound, screaming vocals and a saxophone break, it epitomized their sound. The Sonics changed the key from G to C, modified the riff (performing it instrumentally, rather than vocally), and (while they used the original chord progression, a basic 1-4-5-4 progression, G-C-D-C in G, or C-F-G-F in C), the modified riff emphasizes cross-relations of minor/major intervals against the keyboard. The guitar in the Sonics version does not use fuzz-tone, although it seems that some have mistaken the sax for a fuzz-tone guitar. This is the version that virtually all other performers copied after the '60s.

== Other versions ==
- The song was released by Paul Revere & the Raiders as a 1964 B-side.
- Other contemporary 1960s versions include Woody Carr (1964), the Gallahads (1964), the Hollywood Hurricanes (UK, 1964), the Imperialites (1964), Lee Maye (1964), the Off-Beats (1964), and Sano and the Saints Five (1966).
- Stiv Bators as a 1986 B-side.
- Crazyhead on a 1989 EP.
- Mojo Nixon and Skid Roper on the 1989 album Here Ain't The Sonics.
- Thee Headcoatees on their 1992 album Have Love Will Travel.
- Blood Sausage on their 1993 release Happy Little Bullshit Boy.
- The Brandos on their 1998 release Nowhere Zone (although it was originally recorded for their ill-fated Trial By Fire album in 1989).
- Blues rockers The Black Keys on their 2003 album Thickfreakness, their 7" vinyl single, and their 2004 EP The Moan.
- Jim Belushi and the Sacred Hearts in 2005 (who named a tour with Dan Aykroyd "The Have Love Will Travel Revue").
- Danish retro rock band The Blue Van on their 2005 album The Art of Rolling.
- Australian pop rock band The Basics covered the song on their 2007 album Stand Out/Fit In.
- In 2011, Diesel released a version as the lead single from his EP 7 Axes.
- Dutch funk band Lefties Soul Connection on their 2011 album One Punch Pete, featuring Flo Mega.
- A version by Sky Saxon, lead singer of The Seeds, was released in 2011.
- Bruce Springsteen and the E Street Band performed it at times on their 1988 Tunnel of Love Express tour; the song appears on a 2015 release from the tour, LA Sports Arena, California 1988.
- Australian hip hop group Hilltop Hoods sampled the song in their 2018 track "Leave Me Lonely".
- The Jaded Hearts Club covered the song on their debut album "You've Always Been Here".
- A version by the indie rock band The Wallies was released in 2015 with a music video.

A different song by the same title, written by Lee Hazlewood, was released by The Sharps in 1958.

== Television and movies ==
- The Sonics version appears in the movies RocknRolla (2008), How To Be (2008), Tournée (2010), Man Up (2015), and Ford v Ferrari (2019), in the trailer for John Wick (2014), and in the television series Misfits (2011) and Gloría (2021).
- The Sonics' version was featured in the launch advert for the then-new Land Rover Discovery in the UK from Autumn-Winter 2004
- Since 2007, a cover by Stefan Ashton Frank has been used by LV=, the UK financial services group in its television advertising for car insurance.
- The Basics from Melbourne, Australia covered the song on their 2007 album Stand Out/Fit In and their 2010 live album, and this version was used in an episode of the David Duchovny series Californication.
- The song was used in the BBC series Three Men in More Than One Boat.
- The Sonics' version was featured in September 2014 in a promo for season four of the CNN series Anthony Bourdain: Parts Unknown, and also in October 2014 by ESPN for their tennis broadcast ads. In 2022 it was used in a Bulleit Bourbon television ad.
