= Hear (Diesel album) =

Studio album by Diesel
- Released: 7 October 2002
- Recorded: February–March 2002
- Studio: Eargasm (Sydney); Studios 301 (Sydney)
- Genre: Hard rock
- Length: 45:23
- Label: Hepfidelity
- Producer: Craig Porteils; Diesel; Guy Davies

Diesel chronology
Soul Lost Companion (1999)	Hear (2002)	Singled Out (2004)

Singles from Hear
- 1. "Getta Kick" Released: September 2002; 2. "Battleworn" Released: November 2002; 3. "Angel Face" Released: January 2003; 4. "Faith and Gasoline" Released: April 2003

Hear is the seventh studio album released by American-born, Australian-based hard rocker, Diesel. It was nominated for Best Independent Release at the ARIA Music Awards of 2003, but lost to Up All Night by the Waifs.

== Track listing ==
All tracks written by Diesel (a.k.a. Mark Lizotte) except where noted.

1. "Angel Face" – 3:09
2. "Faith and Gasoline" – 3:40
3. "Getta Kick" (Diesel, Guy Davies) – 3:55
4. "She's High" – 3:27
5. "Brighter than the Sun" (Diesel, Davies) – 4:18
6. "Battleworn" – 4:15
7. "Don't Send Another" (Diesel, G. Wattenberg) – 2:26
8. "I'm Here" (Diesel, Lee Moloney, Richie Vez, Rob Woolf) – 4:45
9. "On Your Sand" (Diesel, Moloney, Vez, Woolf) – 3:50
10. "Lotion" (Diesel, Davies) – 4:17
11. "The Embers" – 3:27
12. "I Wanna Fly" – 3:54

== Personnel ==
- Diesel – vocals, guitar, cello and bass (tracks 3, 5, 12)
- Lee Moloney – drums, percussion
- Richie Vez – bass guitar
- Rob Woolf – keyboards, backing vocals (track 8)

Additional musicians

- Guy Davies – keyboards and programming (tracks 3, 5), backing vocals (track 3)
- Gary Pinto – backing vocals (track 2)

Graphics

- Design, layout – artofthestate.com.au
- Photography – Tracy Stevenson

Recording details

- Producer – Diesel and Craig Porteils (except track 3), Diesel, Porteils and Guy Davies (track 3); at Eargasm and Studios 301, Sydney
- Mixer – Craig Porteils at Studios 301
- Mastering – Leon Zervos at Masterdisk, NYC
- Assistant engineer – Nick Cervanaro

== Charts ==
Chart performance for Here
Chart (2002)	Peak position
Australian Albums (ARIA)	151
