= Cam Butler =

Australian composer, guitarist

- Origin: Melbourne, Australia
- Genres: Rock, Post-rock, Neo Classic
- Occupations: Composer, guitarist, producer
- Instruments: Electric guitar, Acoustic guitar
- Years active: 2001 – present
- Labels: Pharmacy Records, Kasumuen Records
- Website: cambutler.com

Cam Butler is an Australian composer, guitarist, and producer. He is known for his genre-blending compositional approach which involves electric guitar and string instruments.

Butler co-founded the bands Silver Ray, Cam Butler & The Shadows Of Love, and The Coralinas. From 2010, Cam worked as a guitarist, co-songwriter and producer with Australian musical legend, ex Died Pretty singer, the late Ron S. Peno, forming the band, Ron S. Peno and The Superstitions. The band was much loved by fans and released four albums, two of which being long-listed for the Australian Music Prize. Ron S. Peno and The Superstitions played extensively in Melbourne, Sydney and Brisbane as well as touring France, Italy and Spain.

In 2026, Butler released his twelfth solo album, World Forever. The album features a 28-piece string orchestra and the Melbourne Town Hall Grand Organ.

== Discography ==
=== Solo and Cam Butler & The Shadows Of Love ===
- Go Slow (2004)
- Crazy Dreams (2005)
- See (Symphony No.1) (2006)
- Healing Feelings (2007)
- Dark Times (Symphony No 2) (2008)
- Save My Soul (2012)
- Self Portrait (2014)
- Find Your Love (2017)
- Solar (2022)
- Strings Music (2023)
- Spirits Flying Home (2025)
- World Forever (2026)

=== with The Coralinas ===
- Free Energy (2010)

=== with Silver Ray ===
- This Is Silver Ray (2001)
- New Love (2002)
- Humans (2004)
- Homes For Everyone (2007)

=== with Ron S Peno and the Superstitions ===
- Future Universe (2011)
- Anywhere And Everything Is Bright (2013)
- Guiding Light (2017)
- Do The Understanding (2021)
