= Americana (Diesel album) =

Studio album by Diesel
- Released: 1 July 2016
- Genre: Rock
- Length: 46:00
- Label: Liberation
- Producer: Diesel

Diesel chronology
Last Shower (2013)	Americana (2016)	30: The Greatest Hits (2018)

Singles from Americana
- 1. "Angel from Montgomery" Released: 20 June 2016; 2. "Queen Jane Approximately" Released: 4 August 2016; 3. "Ring of Fire" Released: 11 October 2016

Americana is the thirteenth studio album by ARIA Award-winning Australian musician, Diesel. The album was released on 1 July 2016. Upon announcement of the album, Liberation Records said the album is a contemporary piece that "incorporates elements of American roots music styles".

On July 1, Diesel announced the 10-date Americana tour to commence in September 2016.

== Background and release ==
In September 2015, Diesel announced his Pieces of Americana tour. Diesel was born in America and raised in Australia and wanted to pay tribute to the artists who influenced his own musical journey by covering classic songs. "It's such a broad term, 'Americana' – it means different things to different people," he said. The tour commenced in February 2016 and went until March 2016. Additional dates were subsequently added and it continued until June 2016.

On 17 December 2015, he announced "Americana recording sessions have now commenced" and on 26 April 2016, the album Americana was announced along with two promotional songs available for download, "Here Comes My Girl" and "Queen Jane Approximately".

== Reviews ==
Professional ratings
Review scores
Source	Rating
Renowned for Sound	4.5/5 stars
The Music	2.5/5 stars
Rolling Stone Australia	3.5/4 stars

Daniel Patrin from Renowned for Sound said; "Diesel lets the recordings on Americana speak for themselves, offering a nostalgia-laced and respectable record filled with his own panache and aural integrity. It’s by utilising his musical career experience how Diesel can prove with little persuasion, his success in delivering a brilliant tribute record – climactically fusing his Australian musical spirit with his shining American pride."

Mark Bereford from The Music said "Given the musical style of Diesel and the universal adoration for many of the original songs filling Americana, it's a surprise to see it fall.". He did complement the track "Rag Mama Rag".

Michael Dywer of Rolling Stone Australia saw how the concept of "Americana" must mean something else to an American born, Australian raised musician and praised the recasting principle of song genres.

== Track listing ==
1. "Intro...Hank's Dream" [instrumental] (Diesel) – 1:37
2. "Ring of Fire" (June Carter Cash, Merle Kilgore) – 3:11
3. "Rave On" (Sonny West, Bill Tilghman, Norman Petty)– 2:30
4. "Circle Game" (Joni Mitchell) – 4:01
5. "Rag Mama Rag" (Robbie Robertson) – 2:48
6. "Queen Jane Approximately" (Bob Dylan) – 4:11
7. "Fire and Rain" (James Taylor) – 4:18
8. "Born to Run" (Bruce Springsteen) – 4:31
9. "Here Comes My Girl" (Tom Petty, Mike Campbell) – 4:14
10. "Angel from Montgomery" (John Prine) – 4:00
11. "Don't Let It Bring You Down" (Neil Young) – 3:12
12. "Scarlet Ribbons" (Evelyn Danzig, Jack Segal) – 2:49
13. "Born on the Bayou" (John Fogerty) – 4:02

== Charts ==
Chart (2016)	Peak position
Australian Albums (ARIA)	15

== Release history ==
Region	Date	Format(s)	Label	Catalogue
Australia	1 July 2016	CD, digital download	Liberation Records	LMCD0298
