= Project Blues: Saturday Suffering Fools =

Studio album by Diesel
- Released: 20 July 2009
- Recorded: 19 – 27 February 2009, Blackfoot Sound
- Genre: Blues music
- Length: 37:19
- Label: Liberation Records
- Producer: Diesel

Diesel chronology
The Essential Diesel (2009)	Project Blues: Saturday Suffering Fools (2009)	iTunes Live from Sydney: Aussie Legends (2009)

Project Blues: Saturday Suffering Fools is the tenth studio album by Diesel released on 20 July 2009. The album reached a peak of #50 on the ARIA Charts in August 2009. Diesel toured the album nationally throughout October and November 2009 with the "Hits and Blues Tour".

Diesel said, "The album is like an encyclopaedia of what blues is to me. Having done the harmonica and guitar thing, I thought about the whole thing with horns." Diesel worked with Bernie Bremond, his father Hank and brothers Mike & Brian Lizotte on horns, and with drummer Lee Moloney and bassist Richie Vez. The album contains five original tracks.

== Track listing ==
1. "First Time I Met The Blues" (Little Brother Montgomery)
2. "Walkin' The Blues" (Diesel)
3. "My Baby Likes To Boogaloo" (Don Gardner)
4. "Don't Throw Your Love On Me So Strong" (Albert King)
5. "Stoopid Fool" (Diesel)
6. "I Wish You Would" (W. Arnold)
7. "Whiskey And Weed" (Diesel)
8. "Tear Out The Man" (Diesel)
9. "It Hurts Me Too" (Elmore James)
10. "Them Changes" (Buddy Miles)
11. "Sweet Emotion" (Steve Tyler, Tom Hamilton)
12. "Blues For Paddy" (Diesel)

== Weekly charts ==
Chart (2009)	Peak position
Australian Albums (ARIA)	50
