= Let It Fly (Diesel album) =

Studio album by Diesel
- Released: 9 August 2013
- Recorded: Blackfoot Sound, Ocean Sound Sydney & Best Western, Bundaberg.
- Genre: Blues music
- Label: Liberation Records
- Producer: Diesel

Diesel chronology
You Get There From Here (2012)	Let It Fly (2013)	Last Shower (2013)

Let It Fly is the twelfth studio album by Australian musician, Diesel and his first studio set of originals since 2008 and features his 18-year-old daughter Lila Gold on "If You Let Me Give". On the album, Diesel said "It's all of my life's work so far brought to fruition, in many ways. It's pretty encompassing. There's a lot of stuff I've never tried before either – like, there are folk elements that are quite different for me ... I guess when you start using mandolin and fiddle, it's gonna happen!"

Diesel promoted the album in July/August 2013 with a series of 'Fans First' shows, where he showcased the new material followed by a Q&A session. He then toured the album nationally from October 2013 and concluded in May 2014 in Geelong.

== Reviews ==
Arne Sjostedt from Sydney Morning Herald gave the album 4 out of 5 saying "Rolling rock tracks scattered with blues, country, roots and soul. This has become Diesel's territory... his assets are that unique vocal, guitar sensibility and capacity to create tension and release. Showing a deft, dynamic, delicate lyrical touch all over the album - sounding a little Keith Urban every so often, Diesel enjoys playing around in the folk/country/roots space. This suits him. Also inhabiting the formula and sound that made him a household name, it feels as if there isn't much this man can't do. You will play this again."

Sebastian Skeet of The Music gave the album a positive review saying; "Let It Fly sees Diesel tentatively reach out to the country music scene, although parts of the album keep him in rock mode. As usual, it's all about the guitar and the hooks, using his honeycombed voice to caress the melodies out of these mostly interesting songs." Skeet praised songs "Be Your Throne" and "Last Shower" but didn't like "Let it Fly", "Sound Of Guitar" or "Moneymaker" concluding with "If only the weak songs had been edited out this would be one top shelf album."

== Track listing ==
1. "Moneymaker" (2:58)
2. "By Your Throne" (3:15)
3. "One Phone Call" (3:45)
4. "Cupid's Embrace" (2:58)
5. "Last Shower" (featuring Tim Chaisson) (3:39)
6. "Let It Fly" (4:30)
7. "Sound of Guitar" (featuring Blokonut Choir Of Men) (4:23)
8. "If You Let Me Give" (featuring Lila Gold) (3:03)
9. "No Time Tonight" (3:19)
10. "Navigate" (4:05)
11. "Can Feel You" (3:04)
12. "The Miles" (4:13)

=== Weekly charts ===
Chart (2013)	Peak position
Australia (ARIA)	31
Australian Artist (ARIA)	11

== Release history ==
Region	Date	Format(s)	Label	Catalogue
Australia	9 August 2013	Digital download / Compact Disc / Vinyl	Liberation Records	LMLP0227
