= Tim Chaisson =

Canadian singer-songwriter (born 1986)

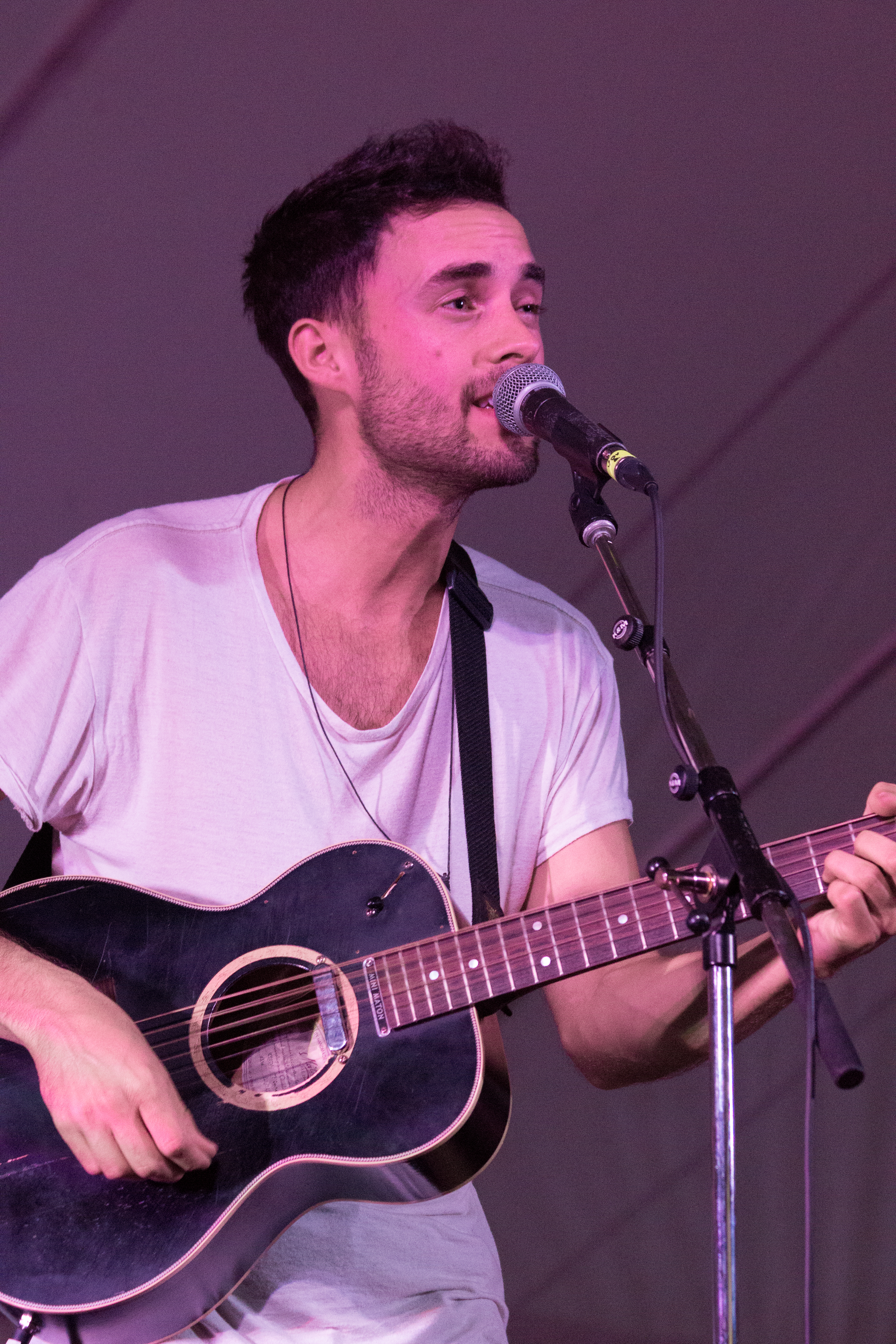
- Performing at the 2015 Hillside Festival

Background information
- Born: Timothy Chaisson; September 6, 1986 (age 39); Bear River, Prince Edward Island, Canada
- Genres: Folk, pop, alternative country
- Occupations: Singer, Songwriter
- Instruments: Vocals, Guitar, Fiddle,
- Years active: 2002–present
- Labels: MDM Recordings; ABC Music
- Website: www.timchaisson.com

Timothy Chaisson (born September 6, 1986) is a Canadian singer/songwriter from Souris, Prince Edward Island. He is a member of Juno Award winning group, The East Pointers.

== Early years ==
Tim Chaisson is a member of the extended Chaisson family, who are prominent in the music scene of Prince Edward Island. Though he had been playing many instruments since he was a child, Chaisson began his professional career at the age of 14 when he was asked to be the bassist in Celtic/contemporary band Kindle which included his two brothers and three cousins. He was the youngest member of the group, touring from 2000 to 2005.

== Tim Chaisson & Morning Fold and Broken Hearted Beat ==
In 2008, Chaisson was joined by Morning Fold, which consisted of Chaisson, guitarist Tian Wigmore, bassist Brien McCarthy, and drummer Nathaniel Lamoureux. In September 2009, Tim Chaisson & Morning Fold released their album, Broken Hearted Beat which was recorded in Dartmouth, Nova Scotia at Joel Plaskett's New Scotland Yard Studio and in Austin, Texas at Willie Nelson's Pedernales Studio. The album was co-written by Chaisson, Plaskett, and Gordie Johnson. Johnson also produced the album. In March 2010, the band filmed their first music video for "Broken Hearted Beat" in Toronto with Canadian director John "JP" Poliquin. The video was released in May 2010 on CMT and also made it to the #1 spot on Much More Music's Top 10. Immediately following the video's release, its single was released and made it to #1 on the East Coast Countdown. The music video for "Slippin' Away", also directed by Poliquin, was released in October 2010. It reached #8 on the Much More Music Top 20 Countdown.

== Touring and collaborations ==
Since the record's release Tim Chaisson & Morning Fold have toured and played shows across Canada and Australia with such acts as The Trews, Joel Plaskett, The Tragically Hip, Big Sugar, Finger 11, Lady Antebellum, Shannon Noll, Lennie Gallant, Matt Andersen, and Ashley MacIsaac. Chaisson performed at the 2010 Winter Olympics in British Columbia, NXNE, CMW, Indie Music Week, Burlington's Sound of Music Festival, Sydney Blues & Roots Festival, Woodford Folk Festival, and Pop Montreal to name a few. Chaisson has also been featured on The Trews song, "Highway of Heroes" playing fiddle and singing back up vocals. He also recorded fiddle and vocals on its new version for the hit TV show, Combat Hospital. He has also been featured on other recordings with acts such as Big Sugar, The SIDH, Grady, Colette Cheverie, and Chrissy Crowley. Chaisson's song "Broken Hearted Beat" was also featured on an episode of CBC's Heartland.

== Nominations and awards ==
Juno Awards

2018 - Traditional Roots Album of the Year - Nominee The East Pointers

Juno Awards

2017 - Traditional Roots Album of the Year - Winner The East Pointers

Canadian Country Music Awards (CCMA)

2015 - Roots Artist Of The Year - Nominee

East Coast Music Awards (ECMA)

2014 - Songwriter Of The Year - Nominated

2014 - Song Of The Year ("The Healing") - Nominated

2014 - Fan's Choice Entertainer Of The Year - Nominated

2013 - Fan's Choice Entertainer Of The Year - Nominated

2013 - Song Of The Year ("Beat This Heart) - Nominated

2013 - Roots / Traditional Solo Recording Of The Year ("The Other Side") - Won

2013 - Fan's Choice Video Of The Year ("Beat This Heart") - Nominated

2012 - Fan's Choice Entertainer Of The Year - Nominated

2012 - Fan's Choice Video Of The Year ("Slippin' Away") - Nominated

2011 – Fan's Choice Video Of The Year ("Broken Hearted Beat") – Nominated

2011 – Group Recording Of The Year (Broken Hearted Beat) – Nominated

2010 – Pop Recording Of The Year (Broken Hearted Beat) - Nominated

2008 – Pop Recording Of The Year (Even) – Nominated

Music Prince Edward Island (MPEI)

2014 - Touring Artist Of The Year - Won

2013 - Album Of The Year ("The Other Side") - Nominated

2013 - Entertainer Of The Year - Nominated

2013 - Male Solo Recording Of The Year ("The Other Side") - Won

2013 - Roots Contemporary Recording Of The Year ("The Other Side") - Nominated

2013 - SOCAN Songwriter Of The Year ("Beat This Heart") - Nominated

2013 - SpinCount Touring Artist Of The Year - Nominated

2013 - Video Of The Year ("Beat This Heart") - Nominated

2012 - Entertainer Of The Year - Nominated

2012 - SpinCount Touring Artist Of The Year - Won

2012 - Video Of The Year ("Slippin' Away") - Nominated

2011 - Video Of The Year ("Broken Hearted Beat") - Nominated

2010 – Group Of The Year – Won

2010 – Pop Album Of The Year (Broken Hearted Beat) – Won

2010 – Entertainer Of The Year – Nominated

2010 – Album Of The Year (Broken Hearted Beat) – Nominated

2010 – Songwriter Of The Year - Nominated

2009 – Entertainer Of The Year – Nominated

2009 – Weekend Warrior Of The Year – Nominated

2007 – Entertainer Of The Year – Won

2007 – Songwriter Of The Year ("Wasn't For You") – Won

2007 – Male Vocalist Of The Year – Won

2007 – Pop Album Of The Year (Even) – Won

2006 – Male Vocalist Of The Year – Nominated

2004 – Album Of The Year (Something Acoustic) – Nominated

2004 – Pop Album Of The Year (Something Acoustic) – Won

2002 – Song Of The Year ("The Source") – Won

"'Canadian Organization of Campus Activities (COCA)'"

2013 - Entertainer Of The Year - Main Stage - Won

2012 - Emerging Artist Of The Year - Won

== Discography ==
=== Studio albums ===
- Broken Hearted Beat (2009)
- The Other Side (2013)
- Last Shower (EP) with Diesel (2013)
- Lost in Light (2015)

=== With The East Pointers ===
==== Studio albums ====
- Secret Victory (2015)
- What We Leave Behind (2017)
- Yours to Break (2019)
- House of Dreams (EP) (2022)
- Safe In Sound (2023)

==== Singles ====
- 82 Fires/Tanglewood (2017)
- Wintergreen (2019)
- Halfway Tree (2019)
- Elmira - Remix with Lonely Kid (2020)
- Stronger Than You Know (2022)
- I Saw Your Ghost (2022)
- Save Your Lonely (2022)
- When I Had You (Chilled) (2023)
- Stronger Than You Know (Chilled) (2023)
- Goolaholla (2023)
- Best Surprise (2023)
- We Will Meet Again (2023)
- Feeling of Home (2023)
- It's the Most Wonderful Time of the Year (2023)
- I Want You (2023)
- Anniversary (2025
- Maritime Moonshine (2025)
- Misty Morning (2025)
- Undercover (2025)
- Rafters (2025)
