= Bootleg Melancholy =

Studio album by Diesel
- Released: 13 October 2023
- Length: 47:02
- Labels: Bloodlines; UMA
- Producer: Mark Lizotte

Diesel chronology
Alone with Blues (2021)	Bootleg Melancholy (2023)

Singles from Bootleg Melancholy
- 1. "Forever" Released: 23 August 2023; 2. "Pasadena" Released: 22 September 2023; 3. "Remember My Love" Released: 5 July 2024

Bootleg Melancholy is the sixteenth studio album by Australian rock musician, Diesel, released on 13 October 2023 through Bloodlines. The album was announced in August 2023, alongside the release of lead single "Forever".

In an interview with Triple M, Diesel said it was recorded in his home studio.

The album was supported with an Australian tour between January and April 2024. Further dates were added in July 2024, taking place between August and December 2024. Additional dates were added in January 2025 taking the tour across Australia between March and May 2025.

== Reception ==
Joseph Earp from Music Feeds said "Bootleg Melancholy has been described as an 'unabashedly exuberant' work, notable for its diverse style and the cohesive story it aims to tell across its 14 tracks... That said, those who expect rousing pop choruses from Diesel need not fear – the album contains plenty of big hooks. Oh, and gearheads rejoice: the album features a great deal of vintage tech, with songs written and performed on classic guitars."

Bryget Chrisfield from Beat Magazine called it "A bluesy, multifaceted masterpiece that's worth every listen"

Greg Phillips from Australian Musician said "Loaded with hooks, these songs greet with the warmth and familiarity of a good friend, songs about family, mortality, childhood, and dreams. Travelling across time, place, and memory, this is rousing yet reflective pop music that celebrates the joys of everyday life while braving the difficult stuff – the challenges we all eventually face – with insights and tenderness."

== Track listing ==
1. "Forever" – 3:25
2. "Backpedal" – 3:22
3. "Circle Navigator" – 4:02
4. "Lights Go Down" – 3:39
5. "Like a Dove" – 3:22
6. "Bootleg Melancholy" – 2:36
7. "Vital Signs" – 3:25
8. "Never Giving Up" – 3:03
9. "Corduroy and Crumbs" – 3:41
10. "Pasadena" – 3:52
11. "Starts with One" – 2:51
12. "Tambourine Girl" – 3:09
13. "Babies" – 2:51
14. "Remember My Love" – 3:44

== Charts ==
Chart performance for Bootleg Melancholy
Chart (2023)	Peak position
Australian Albums (ARIA)	43
