= Sunset Suburbia =

Studio album by Diesel
- Released: 28 August 2020
- Recorded: 2019–2020
- Length: 36:18
- Label: Bloodlines; UMA

Diesel chronology
| 30: The Greatest Hits (2018) | Sunset Suburbia (2020) | Alone with Blues (2021) |

Singles from Sunset Suburbia
- 1. "On the Inside" Released: 4 May 2020

Sunset Suburbia is the fourteenth studio album by Australian rock musician, Diesel. The album was announced on 4 May 2020, alongside the release of the single "On the Inside", and was released on 28 August 2020. The album was preceded by two extended plays released in 2019.

Following the release of Sunset Suburbia, Diesel will support the album with a tour.

== Background and release ==
On 11 June 2019, Diesel released the song "By the Scars", the first track taken from the Sunset Suburbia project: a trilogy of EPs leading into an album in 2020.

On 2 August, the first EP titled Sunset Suburbia Vol. 1 was released with Diesel saying "For me, records have always been a little overwhelming. When I think back I've had panic attacks. When you are taking on something so big and then get through it, ironically when I get through it, I feel bummed when it comes to an end. Like, can't we just make it go a bit longer? The EP thing elongates the process and suits my lifestyle a bit more. It suits me creatively a lot more too". Diesel confirmed that EP one and two is complete adding "Every EP is like a mini album with a relativity between the songs. I do like to mix it up a bit with different styles. The next one is a lot different, it's not as Americana as the first one, it has an English feel".

On 8 November 2019, the second EP Sunset Suburbia Vol. 2 and single "In Reverse" were released and confirm that volume 3 was "under construction".

In May 2020, the single "On the Inside" was released and the album release date of August 2020 was confirmed, abandoning the third EP.

About the title, Diesel said "Suburbia has always held a strange fascination for me. I remember designer cul-de-sacs strewn with shotgun shells in Chandler, Arizona; little vignettes of skateboarding around closed service stations on weekends in Perth, Australia; some guy in the hot tub in his backyard where I'm riding my bike over the rail overpass in Sydney. I love going into where people live — the sights, the smells, the little repetitive things that make their world. It's kind of a bittersweet thing but it's the stuff of life and it has a way of making songs."

The album includes the tracks "By the Scars" and "Wake Up with an Angel" from Sunset Suburbia Vol. 1 and "In Reverse" and "Quietly Drift" from Sunset Suburbia Vol. 2.

== Track listing ==
1. "On the Inside" – 3:55
2. "In Reverse" – 3:31
3. "Come Back" – 3:23
4. "NYC" – 3:41
5. "I Found a Love" – 3:27
6. "By the Scars" – 3:41
7. "Quietly Drift" – 3:31
8. "I'm Sold" – 3:27
9. "Wake Up with an Angel" – 3:48
10. "Sunset Suburbia" – 3:54

== Charts ==
Chart performance of Sunset Suburbia
| Chart (2020) | Peak position |
|---|---|
| Australian Albums (ARIA) | 10 |

== Release history ==
| Region | Date | Format(s) | Label | Catalogue |
|---|---|---|---|---|
| Australia | 28 August 2020 | CD, digital download, streaming, limited-edition LP | Bloodlines / UMA | Blood72 |
