= Dig (Mark Lizotte song) =

Single by Mark Lizotte

from the album Soul Lost Companion
- B-side: "Dr Jesus/ Sleep While Walking"
- Released: August 1999
- Genre: Rock, Funk music, Soul music, Pop music
- Length: 4:52
- Label: Mammoth Records
- Songwriters: Mark Lizotte, Guy Davies
- Producer: Jerry Harrison

Mark Lizotte singles chronology
"Strange Love" (1996)	"Dig" (1999)	"Satellite" (1999)

“Dig” is a song by Australian rock musician, Mark Lizotte. It is his first release under his birth name. The song was co-written by Guy Davies and released in August 1999 and peaked at 18 in Australia. It was included on his debut solo album Soul Lost Companion in October 1999. "Dig" was the 42nd most played track on Australian Radio in 1999.

== Background and Release ==
In 1996, after helping produce and write some tracks on Vika and Linda Bull's album Princess Tabu, and the release of Short Cool Ones and Rewind – The Best Of, Diesel relocated with his family to New York City. In 1998 signed a new deal with Mammoth Records and decided to re-emerge under his own name, Mark Lizotte. In November 1998, Lizotte was back in Australia and appeared at the Telstra Concert of the Century/Mushroom 25th anniversary where he joined Chris Wilson and Jimmy Barnes on stage. Lizotte worked with Talking Heads' Jerry Harrison and Gavin McKillop on the new material.

== Track listing ==
1. "Dig" (Radio Edit)
2. "Dr. Jesus"
3. "Sleep While Walking"
4. "Dig" (Album Version)

== Charts ==
“Dig" debuted and peaked at number 18 in Australia.

=== Weekly charts ===
Chart (1999)	Peak position
Australia (ARIA)	18
