= Coathanger Antennae =

Studio album by Diesel
- Released: 17 June 2006
- Recorded: Freight Train Studios & Morleigh Glen '05
- Genres: Alternative rock, Blues music
- Length: 48:50
- Label: Liberation Records

Diesel chronology
Singled Out (2004)	Coathanger Antennae (2006)	Days Like These (2008)

Singles from Coathanger Antennae
- 1. "Saviour" Released: February 2006; 2. "Crazytown" Released: May 2006; 3. "Steal My Sunshine" Released: 2007

Coathanger Antennae is the eighth studio album by Diesel released in June 2006. The album reached a peak of #23 on the ARIA Charts in July 2006.

Coathanger Antennae is an album Diesel recorded himself, playing virtually live to tape - a method Diesel swears "worked well for the Beatles". "There's an old joke about a band in a recording studio, and after they've done a take the sound engineer says into their headphones: 'Yeah, it sounds like shit, come on in!' That's the way making records is these days - everything can be fixed later, and it's easy to get sucked into that method of recording, brick by brick, layer upon layer."

Coathanger Antennae was recorded in two months with Diesel backed by bassist Richie Vez and drummer Lee Moloney. In 2018, Diesel said; “I want to make records where I can play with other people and just have fun. I want to make records where I can play with other people and just have fun.”

== Track listing ==
1. Sea by Stars
2. Saviour
3. Beautiful Life
4. Up in My Room
5. Moon Morning
6. Let You In
7. Positive+
8. Crazytown
9. No Sign for Like
10. Is It Ok Love
11. I Do
12. Wait For Me
13. Steal My Sunshine

== Weekly charts ==
Chart (2006)	Peak position
Australian Albums (ARIA)	23
