= The Lobbyist =

Studio album by Diesel
- Released: 9 August 1993
- Recorded: October 1992; February 1993; February 1993
- Studio: AIR Studios, London; Metropolis Studios, Melbourne; The Metro, Melbourne (live); The Old Lion, Adelaide (live)
- Genre: Hard rock, acoustic
- Length: 47:53
- Label: EMI
- Producer: Diesel, Don Gehman

Diesel chronology
Hepfidelity (1992)	The Lobbyist (1993)	Solid State Rhyme (1994)

Singles from The Lobbyist
- 1. "Never Miss Your Water" Released: July 1993; 2. "Masterplan" Released: October 1993; 3. "I've Been Loving You Too Long" Released: January 1994

The Lobbyist is the third studio album by American-Australian hard rocker Diesel. It features twelve tracks: four live, five acoustic, and three studio recordings. The album was released on 9 August 1993 via EMI Records and was co-produced by Diesel with Don Gehman. It peaked at No. one on the ARIA Albums Chart and followed directly after his previous number-one album, Hepfidelity (1992). In New Zealand it reached No. 27. The album's title is in "reference to the amount of time he spends in hotels."

Three singles were released from the album: "Never Miss Your Water" (July 1993), "Masterplan" (October) and "I've Been Loving You Too Long" (January 1994). The album was certified gold in Australia. At the ARIA Music Awards of 1994 Diesel won Best Male Artist for the second of three times in a row. He was also nominated for Album of the Year for The Lobbyist and Single of the Year, Song of the Year, Producer of the Year for "Never Miss Your Water" – the latter nomination also covered his work on "Masterplan" and "I've Been Loving You Too Long".

The three studio tracks on The Lobbyist were added to the 1993 European release of Hepfidelity.

== Reception ==
In September 1993 Nicole Leedham of The Canberra Times rated the album at seven-and-a-half out of ten and explained, "[it]s not Diesel's best work so far but it is more proof that the man is one of the greatest guitarist-singer-songwriters in this country." She described the album as "not really 'new' in that there are only three new studio songs appearing, with most of the material coming from acoustic and live sessions. It is, however, destined to be well regarded by fans and critics alike."

== Track listing ==
All tracks are written by Mark Denis Lizotte (aka Diesel), except where noted

No.	Title	Session	Length
1.	"Brand New Song"	studio	4:20
2.	"Never Miss Your Water" (Lizotte, John Daniel Tate)	studio	3:56
3.	"Masterplan"	studio	5:21
4.	"I've Been Loving You Too Long" (Otis Redding, Jerry Butler)	acoustic	3:53
5.	"One More Time" (Lizotte, Jerry Lynn Williams)	acoustic	3:59
6.	"Come to Me"	acoustic	4:28
7.	"Harder They Come" (Jimmy Cliff)	acoustic	3:28
8.	"Tip of My Tongue" (Lizotte, Tate)	acoustic	3:57
9.	"Rhythm of Your Soul" (Lizotte, James Hilbun)	live	3:43
10.	"Get Lucky" (Lizotte, Don Walker)	live	5:42
11.	"One More Time" (Lizotte, Williams)	live	4:33
12.	"The Righteous One"	live	3:51

== Chart positions ==
Year	Chart	Position
1993	ARIA Albums Chart	1
1993	New Zealand Albums Chart	27

=== Certifications ===
Region	Certification	Certified units/sales
Australia (ARIA)	Gold	35,000^{^}
^{^} Shipments figures based on certification alone.

== See also ==
List of number-one albums in Australia during the 1990s
