= Days Like These (album) =

Studio album by Diesel
- Released: 23 August 2008
- Recorded: July 2008 @ Ocean St. Sound, Blackfoot Hollow & Freight Train Studios
- Genre: Alternative rock, Blues music
- Length: 36:30
- Label: Liberation Records
- Producer: Diesel, Richie Vez, Lee Moloney

Diesel chronology
Coathanger Antennae (2006)	Days Like These (2008)	The Essential Diesel (2009)

Singles from Coathanger Antennae
- 1. "Days Like These" Released: June 2008

Days Like These is the ninth studio album by Diesel released in August 2008. The album reached a peak of #17 on the ARIA Charts in September 2008.

The album was recorded in 12 days, whereby Diesel recorded 17 tracks. "There were some overdubs done later but basically the tracks were done really quickly. It was probably the fastest writing process for me ever." Diesel toured the album around Australia from October to December 2008.“It was just the three of us,” says Diesel. “Myself, Richie Vez on bass and Lee Moloney on drums. It`s a new spin on old ground.”

During 2022 he presented a 12-part TV documentary series Days Like These with Diesel, with each episode describing a pivotal concert by Australian artists: Jet, Baby Animals, Hunters & Collectors, the Angels, Diesel, Rose Tattoo, Jimmy Barnes, Eurogliders, Archie Roach, Icehouse, Troy Cassar-Daley and Cold Chisel.

== Reviews ==
Phil Bennett of Nova Magazine said the album is "wonderful". saying "With minimal assistance - a drummer, a bassist and himself - Diesel has come up with another underrated, understated winner."

== Track listing ==
1. "Days Like These"
2. "Souldier"
3. "Crimson Man"
4. "Lay Down Here"
5. "Something Good"
6. "Prisoner"
7. "Need Your Fire"
8. "Ain't Giving Up"
9. "That Strong"
10. "Take My Heart"

== Weekly charts ==
Chart (2006)	Peak position
Australian Albums (ARIA)	17
