= Craig Porteils =

- Born: Australia
- Origin: Sydney, Australia
- Genres: Pop, rock, hard rock, heavy metal, dance, R&B, soul, country
- Years active: 1980s–2022

Craig Porteils was an Australian music producer, mixer, audio engineer, composer, songwriter, and guitarist based in Sydney.

== Biography ==
=== Career ===
Porteils began his career in the decade of the 1980s, as the guitarist of his own band. However, Porteils excelled in behind-the-scenes production and started producing music in continuation. From 1989 to 1996, Porteils was based out of Los Angeles where he experienced great success writing for huge artists such as Cher, having helped produce her 3× platinum album Heart of Stone which peaked at number 10 on the US Billboard 200, by contributing to the song "If I Could Turn Back Time", which went to number 1 on the Billboard Hot 100. He also has produced Billy Idol's top 10 hit "Cradle of Love" from the album Charmed Life, Tevin Campbell's top 10 hit Back to the World, Guns N' Roses' number 1 hit "Knockin' on Heaven's Door", Terence Trent D'arby's Symphony or Damn, Rod Stewart's "Rhythm of My Heart", Ozzy Osbourne's No More Tears, and Richie Sambora's "One Light Burning".

Porteils has been the production manager and composer of many American film scores and soundtracks, such as Parenthood, directed by Ron Howard and starring Steve Martin, Frankie and Johnny, starring Al Pacino, Three of Hearts, Johnny Handsome, starring Mickey Rourke, and Cry-Baby, starring Johnny Depp.,

In 1996, Porteils returned to Australia to work in the music industry of his native country. He has participated in the production of the popular show Australian Idol and produced albums for Shannon Noll and Guy Sebastian. He has produced for many winners of the show in studio. Some of his Australian collaborations include Diesel, Cactus Child, Wendy Matthews, Shortstack, David Campbell, Deni Hines, Ultimo, Damien Lieth, Young Divas, Joel Turner, Michala Banas, The Noll Brothers, The Jefferson and Human Nature.

=== Eurovision Song Contest 2009 ===
On 10 February 2009, it was revealed by the Greek networks Ellinikí Radiofonía Tileórasi (ERT) and MAD TV (Greece) that Porteilis along with Greek-Australian songwriter and record executive Cameron Giles-Webb had written the lyrics to two songs called "Right on Time" and "This is Our Night" for Greek superstar Sakis Rouvas as two of three potential candidates that competed in the Greek National Final where both the public and a professional jury voted on 18 February to select Rouvas' entry to represent Greece in the Eurovision Song Contest 2009 in Moscow.

Porteils and Giles-Webb were competing against an up-and-coming Greek lyricist Alexandra Zakka, whose first works as a songwriter was her collaboration for the Eurovision. All three songs had been produced by Dimitris Kontopoulos, as had been previously confirmed by ERT, while the names of the lyricists and the song titles as well as vague descriptions of the genres of the songs were revealed on 10 February. Originally, the songs were to be presented at a press conference on ERT at the Hilton Hotel on 11 February, however, small pieces of information were given out the day before, while the official press conference where the songs will be presented for the first time will take place on 12 February. On 18 February 2009, Rouvas will perform all three songs in the National Final, with full choreography by Fokas Evangelinos. The selected entry will represent Greece in the Eurovision.

The song "Right on Time" was described as a dynamic, mid-tempo song, while "This Is Our Night" was characterized as an imposing dance song.

Portiels died on the 30th of April, 2022 from cancer.
