= Crazytown (Diesel song) =

Single by Diesel

from the album Coathanger Antennae
- B-side: "Blown to Bits"
- Released: 20 May 2006
- Recorded: Freight Train Studios & Morleigh Glen, 2005
- Genre: Rock, Pop music
- Length: 3:33
- Label: Liberation Records
- Songwriter(s): Diesel

Diesel singles chronology
"Postcards from the Moon" (2005)	"Crazytown" (2006)	"Saviour" (2006)

“Crazytown” is a song by Australian rock musician, Diesel. It is the first single from his album Coathanger Antennae. The song was released in May 2006 and peaked at number 39 in Australia. A live music video was released to promote the single.

== Track listing ==
1. "Crazytown" - 3:33
2. "Blown To Bits" - 3:56

== Charts ==
“Crazytown" peaked at number 39 in June 2006 in Australia.

=== Weekly charts ===
Chart (2006)	Peak position
Australia (ARIA)	39
