= Short Cool Ones =

Studio album by Wilson Diesel
- Released: 22 April 1996
- Recorded: 1995–1996
- Genre: Blues
- Length: 57:50
- Label: Aurora, EMI
- Producer: Doug Roberts, Chris Wilson, Johnny Diesel

Chris Wilson chronology
Live at the Continental (1995)	Short Cool Ones (1996)	The Long Weekend (1998)

Johnny Diesel chronology
Solid State Rhyme (1994)	Short Cool Ones (1996)	Rewind – The Best Of (1996)

Singles from Short Cool Ones
- 1. "I Can't Stand the Rain" Released: March 1996; 2. "Strange Love" Released: May 1996

Short Cool Ones is a 1996 collaborative album by Wilson Diesel, (Chris Wilson and Johnny Diesel). The album consists mainly of blues covers, with one original track, "Other Man". It was co-produced by Doug Roberts, Wilson, and Diesel. They released two singles, "I Can't Stand the Rain" (March) and "Strange Love" (May).

== Background ==
In April 1996 Wilson Diesel issued a collaborative album, Short Cool Ones on Aurora Records label for Mushroom Records, with Chris Wilson on lead vocals and harmonica, and Johnny Diesel on lead vocals and lead guitar. Australian musicologist, Ian McFarlane, described it as including "15 soul and R&B standards ... and a sole original, 'Other Man'". "Other Man" was written by Diesel (aka Mark Lizotte). Other performers were Dean Addison on bass guitar, Angus Diggs on drums, and Rob Woolf on keyboards and backing vocals.

It was recorded from late 1995 to early 1996 at Clam Shoals and Sing Sing Studios with Doug Roberts co-producing with Wilson and Diesel. Wilson Diesel recorded a separate track, "Trim the Tree", for The Spirit of Christmas 1996 (November) – a charity Christmas-based album with proceeds for Starlight Foundation's Australian branch. By that time Diesel had left Australia to work in the United States and Wilson had returned to his solo career. In November 1998, Wilson Diesel briefly reformed for the Mushroom 25 Concert – celebrating Mushroom Records' anniversary. On 26 October 2013 Wilson Diesel reunited to perform the entire album at the Sydney Blues & Roots Festival.

== Track listing ==
Short Cool Ones track listing
No.	Title	Writer(s)	Length
1.	"I Can't Stand the Rain"	Ann Peebles, Don Bryant, Bernard Miller	3:45
2.	"Other Man"	Mark Lizotte	3:52
3.	"Spoonful"	Willie Dixon	4:06
4.	"Strange Love"	Jerry West	2:12
5.	"Evil (Is Going On)"	Dixon	2:48
6.	"Tee Ni Nee Ni Nu"	James Moore	2:10
7.	"Little Red Rooster"	Dixon	4:40
8.	"Running Shoes"	Weldon Bonner	4:02
9.	"Too Wet to Plough"	John Ned Shines	5:14
10.	"My Babe"	Dixon	2:44
11.	"Somebody Loan Me a Dime"	Milton Middlebrook, Fenton Robinson, Jesse Anderson	3:48
12.	"Sun Is Shining"	Elmore James	4:45
13.	"Sugar Babe"	Waymon Glasco	3:01
14.	"Cherokee Dance"	Robert Landers	2:55
15.	"Don't Start Me Talkin'"	Sonny Boy Williamson	2:42
16.	"Who Will Your Next Fool Be"	Charlie Rich	5:01

== Personnel ==
- Chris Wilson – lead vocals (on tracks 1, 5, 6, 7, 9, 13, 14, 15, 16), harmonica
- Johnny Diesel – lead vocals (on tracks 1, 2, 3, 4, 7, 8, 10, 11, 12, 13, 15), lead guitar

Additional musicians

- Dean Addison – bass guitar (except track 13)
- Angus Diggs – drums (except track 13)
- Wayne Duncan – bass guitar (track 13)
- Rob Woolf – keyboards, backing vocals
- Gary Young – drums (track 13)

Design

- Art direction, photography, design – Pierre Baroni

Production work

- Engineer – Adam Rhodes, Spiro Fousketakis
- Mastering – Don Bartley
- Mixer – Doug Roberts
- Producer – Doug Roberts, Chris Wilson, Johnny Diesel
- Studios – Clam Shoals (recording), Sing Sing Studios (recording, mixing), EMI Studios 301 (mastering)

== Charts ==
Weekly chart performance for Short Cool Ones
Chart (1996)	Peak position
Australian Albums (ARIA)	18
