= Chris Wilson (Australian musician) =

Australian musician (1956–2019)

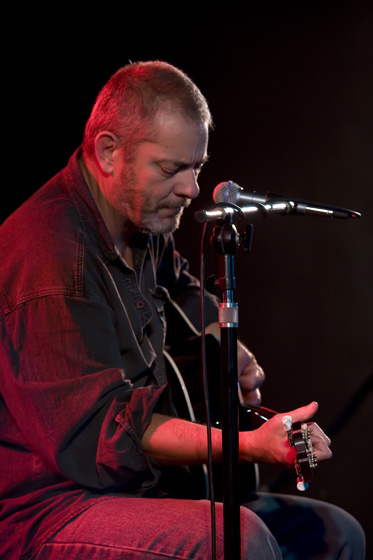
- Wilson performing at the East Brunswick Social Club, Melbourne, April 2008

Background information
- Born: Christopher John Wilson; 2 December 1956; Alphington, Victoria, Australia
- Died: 16 January 2019 (aged 62) Melbourne, Victoria, Australia
- Genres: Blues-rock, rock, country, folk
- Occupations: Musician, songwriter, teacher
- Instruments: Guitar, vocals, harmonica, saxophone
- Years active: 1984–2018
- Labels: Crawdaddy, Aurora/Mushroom, Black Market, Forge
- Website: chriswilson.com.au

Christopher John Wilson (2 December 1956 – 16 January 2019) was an Australian blues musician who sang and played harmonica, saxophone and guitar. He performed as part of the Sole Twisters, Harem Scarem and Paul Kelly and the Coloured Girls, and fronted his band Crown of Thorns. Wilson's solo albums are Landlocked (June 1992), The Long Weekend (March 1998), Spiderman (2000), King for a Day (July 2002), Flying Fish (2012) and the self titled Chris Wilson (2018).

In March 1996, Wilson collaborated with Johnny Diesel in a blues project, Wilson Diesel, which issued an album, Short Cool Ones, composed mostly of "soul and R&B standards". It peaked at No. 18 on the ARIA Albums Chart. Outside of his music career Wilson taught English at various secondary schools in Melbourne for about 20 years.

On 24 July 2018, Wilson's management announced that he had been diagnosed with pancreatic cancer and was unlikely to perform again. A fundraising concert at the Corner Hotel was announced and quickly sold out. Fellow musician and friend Suzannah Espie set up a GoFundMe page which raised over AU$100,000 in just a few days before ceasing to accept further donations.

In 2020, Wilson was inducted into the Music Victoria Hall of Fame.

== Life and career ==
=== 1956–1987: Early years and collaborations ===
Christopher John Wilson was born in 1956. He grew up in Alphington, an inner-Melbourne suburb. He completed his tertiary studies, and worked as an English teacher at various Melbourne secondary schools for "some 20 years".

In 1984, Wilson joined Sole Twisters; the R&B band included Brian Horne, Barry Palmer, his brother Craig Palmer, Jeff Pickard, and Nigel Sweeting. His early influences were Australian blues groups, Chain and Carson.

In September 1985, Wilson, on harmonica and saxophone, and Barry Palmer on lead guitar, joined a neo-Blues group, Harem Scarem, alongside Peter Jones on drums, Charles Marshall on guitar, Christopher Marshall on lead vocals and Glen Sheldon on bass guitar. This line-up recorded their debut studio album, Pilgrim's Progress for Au Go Go Records, which was released in December 1986.

While a member of Harem Scarem, Wilson provided harmonica on Paul Kelly and the Coloured Girls' debut album, Gossip (September 1986). By May 1987 Wilson had left Harem Scarem, he joined Kelly's 45-date tour of North America promoting Gossip. Wilson acknowledged Kelly for extending his repertoire beyond harmonica, "I was asked on as a sax player too and I didn't play all that much sax when [Kelly] asked. But he had that faith in me that I'd get my act together." During that year Wilson also guested on the Hunters & Collectors' album What's a Few Men? (November 1987), on Paul Kelly and the Coloured Girls' next album, Under the Sun (December), and played with hard rockers X.

=== 1987–1991: Crown of Thorns and The Pub Dogs ===
In 1987, Wilson formed his own band, Crown of Thorns, with Barry Palmer and Chris Rodgers on double bass, bass guitar and fiddle Stuart Coupe of The Canberra Times described the group's sound as "a diverse amalgam, recalling everything from Tim Buckley to Captain Beefheart and American blues". While Wilson felt his group was not only a blues band as "there's elements of country and straight rock 'n' roll". Their debut release was a six-track extended play, Gnawing on the Bones of Elvis(Crawdaddy Records), which was produced by the band and appeared in April 1988. Australian musicologist, Ian McFarlane, noted it was "sparsely recorded ... [which] mixed one side of electric blues including Willie Dixon's 'Bring It on Home', and one side of acoustic folk tunes".

Crown of Thorns released a studio album, Carnival (February 1989. Crawdaddy Records), using a line up of Wilson, Palmer and Rodgers, joined by Justin Brady on violin, Barbara Waters on guitar, vocals and mandolin (ex-Hollowmen) and former bandmate Jones on drums. The album was produced by Wilson and Waters with Chris Thompson. McFarlane described it as a "more fully realised work than the debut. [It] mixed blues, country and folk with a great deal of verve and authority". It contained Wilson's composition "The Ballad of Slim Boy Fat", which was a "highlight" of the album with its "spectacular blues/gospel" style. In 1990 the group released another studio album, Babylon (Crawdaddy Records) with Wilson, Rodgers and Waters joined by Ashley Davies on drums (ex-White Cross).

Late in 1990 he formed a briefly existing group, The Pub Dogs, with Wilson on harmonica and lead vocals, Barry Palmer on electric and acoustic guitars, Graham Lee on pedal steel guitar and backing vocals (ex-The Triffids); and Marko Halstead on acoustic guitar, mandolin and backing vocals (of The Blackeyed Susans). They issued a live EP, Scatter's Liver: Pub Dogs Live on the Wireless in the next year on Crawdaddy Records thru Shock Records, which had been recorded at radio station Triple J's studios in Melbourne on 22 October 1990.

In August 1991 Wilson provided lead vocals for the debut solo album by Robin Casinader (ex-the Wreckery), All This Will Be Yours.

He also played harmonica on three songs on the album Woodface (1991) by Crowded House ("Chocolate Cake", "Tall Trees", and "There Goes God").

=== 1992–1995: Chris Wilson Band and solo releases ===
During 1992 Wilson formed the Chris Wilson Band and released an EP, The Big One, in May and a studio album, Landlocked, in June. The line-up were Wilson and Rodgers with Jen Anderson on violin (The Black Sorrows), Rebecca Barnard on backing vocals (ex-Stephen Cummings Band), Peter Luscombe on drums (The Black Sorrows), and Shane O'Mara on guitars (Stephen Cummings Band). Los Angeles Times' reviewer, Mike Boehm, felt that on the album "he sometimes becomes bogged down with self-conscious attempts at poetic imagery, and that high-voltage vocal style can seem strident".

In June 1992, Wilson and Crown of Thorns performed a combined tour promoting recent material. Laurie White caught their gig at Tilley's which "a privileged few will remember for an age (if only I'd taken a Walkman like one lucky bootlegger)" with Wilson described as "a huge writhing gospel cyber punk, [who] sings and plays harp with such venom and power it's impossible to ignore him against melancholy songs (reminiscent of Archie Roach at his most tearful). The change in gear is exhilarating if not frightening". Wilson followed with another EP, Alimony Blues, in October; it had a cover version of Booker T. Jones' "Born Under a Bad Sign", which McFarlane declared had Wilson's vocals "backed by [O'Mara's] blistering guitar work, [and] was one of the finest renditions ever committed to record".

In March 1993, Wilson and fellow Australian singer-songwriters Barnard, Kelly, Archie Roach, Deborah Conway and David Bridie each performed a set at a Hollywood concert, The Melbourne Shuffle. Boehm described Wilson as "a big, denim-clad slab of a man with a shaven head and the look of a street tough or a stevedore. In contrast to such reserved performers as Kelly ... he had a taste for the monumental. His big, rangy, high-impact voice supported his flair for the dramatic flourish and the grand gesture". As a performer Wilson showed "a dry, laconic wit between songs, [he] was a fervent, let-it-all-out wailer when he began to sing".

At the ARIA Music Awards of 1993, Wilson was nominated for ARIA Award for Best Male Artist and Breakthrough Artist – Album for Landlocked. In June 1993 Wilson, Charlie Owen, and three former members of The Triffids: David McComb, Robert McComb and Graham Lee guested on Acuff's Rose's debut studio album, Never Comin' Down.

On 20 May 1994 Wilson's performance at the Continental Hotel in Prahran was recorded for Live at the Continental, which was released in October. The album provided Wilson with another nomination for Best Male Artist at the ARIA Music Awards of 1995. Wilson toured extensively and played at many festivals, both in Australia and overseas, and shared stages with Bob Dylan, and with Johnny Diesel. He provided backing vocals on the Merril Bainbridge song "Under the Water" for her album The Garden (1995).

=== 1996–2012: Continued success ===
In March 1996, Wilson Diesel released a collaborative album, Short Cool Ones, on Mushroom Records, with Wilson on lead vocals and harmonica, and Diesel on lead vocals and lead guitar. Short Cool Ones peaked at No. 18 on the ARIA Albums Chart. McFarlane described it as including "15 soul and R&B standards ... and a sole original, 'Other Man'". "Other Man" was written by Diesel (aka Mark Lizotte). Other performers were Dean Addison on bass guitar, Angus Diggs on drums, and Rob Woolf on keyboards and backing vocals. Paul Petran of Radio National's Live on Stage felt Short Cool Ones was "one of the most successful blues albums in Australian history".

Wilson's next solo album, The Long Weekend, was released in March 1998 as a two CD set. McFarlane noted the album had "22 excellent tracks, [it] drew on blues, gospel and country elements". In May Wilson supported Kelly at the Metro in Melbourne where Wilson was "crashing through a slightly hollow mix with a bunch of the good stuff, picking the eyes out of his recent Long Weekend thing, and throwing in some older selections – the 'best done by Elvis' Mystery Train being a big blow, as is the pump action 'Shoot Out at Seven Eleven', while the big ballady 'Too Many Hearts' again is a glory and must be a single, surely".

At the ARIA Music Awards of 1998 Wilson received another nomination as Best Male Artist, for The Long Weekend. In November he appeared at the Mushroom 25 Concert both as a solo artist and in Wilson Diesel. In January 1999 Wilson was a support act for Elvis Costello on an Australian tour.

By 2000, Wilson had formed Chris Wilson and the Spidermen with Rodgers, Shannon Bourne on guitar, and Dave Folley on drums. Wilson issued a solo album, Spiderman, which was recorded at Studio 335, Southbank with Wilson, O'Mara and Thompson co-producing; O'Mara also guested on two tracks. Rhythms Magazine's readers' poll rated Spiderman as the Best Australian Blues Album of 2000. Melbourne Blues Rock website's Tim Slingsby reviewed the album in September 2011 and noted it was "a mix of covers and originals. ... [The covers] are given a real personal touch one could easily think Wilson and gang had crafted the songs themselves". Slingsby felt the "production allows both the guitar and harmonica to stand out on tracks, trade off licks, and then fall back to accompany the other instruments. Overall the album has a strong dynamic range with slower, sultry songs inserted amongst the more lively tracks without dropping off in feel".

During May 2002 Wilson recorded his next album at two studios in Melbourne with Kerryn Tolhurst producing. King for a Day, which was released in July 2002. Along with Bourne, Folley and Rodgers, the album featured Tolhurst (guest guitars, piano, mandolin and tipple), Cyndi Boste (guest lead vocals), Sarah Carroll (guest lead vocals) and Skip Sail (guest banjo).

In March 2003 Richard Sharman of I-94 Bar website reviewed Chris Wilson and The Spidermen's gig at the Bridge Hotel in Sydney, and found that Wilson's "voice was magnificent ranging from soft tenderness to a bellowing roar that raised shivers at the back of my neck. His voice sounded better than ever and his harp playing was superb – this boy can play!"

=== 2013–present: Later years and death ===
On 26 October 2013, Wilson Diesel reunited to perform the entire Short Cool Ones album at the Sydney Blues & Roots Festival.

On 30 October 2019, Chris Wilson was inducted into the Blues Music Victoria Inc Hall of Fame as the 2019 Peoples Choice, Victorian Blues Legend.

In 2020, Wilson was inducted into the Music Victoria Awards' Hall of Fame.

== Personal life and death ==
Wilson married fellow musician Sarah Carroll and had two sons with her, who are also musicians. He died 16 January 2019, having been diagnosed with pancreatic cancer in 2018.

== Discography ==
=== Studio albums ===
List of albums, with Australian chart positions
| Title | Album details | Peak chart positions |
| Title | Album details | AUS |
|---|---|---|
| Landlocked | Released: June 1992; Format: CD, cassette; Label: Aurora (D30763) | 86 |
| Short Cool Ones (as Wilson Diesel) | Released: April 1996; Format: CD, LP; Label: Aurora, Mushroom (TVD93459) | 18 |
| The Long Weekend | Released: March 1998; Format: 2×CD; Label: Aurora, Mushroom (MUSH33094.2) | 75 |
| Spiderman | Released: 2000; Format: CD; Label: Chris Wilson (CW1500) | — |
| King for a Day | Released: July 2002; Format: CD; Label: Chris Wilson (Forge 001) | — |
| Flying Fish | Released: 2012; Format: CD, digital download; Label: Chris Wilson (Forge 004) | — |
| Chris Wilson | Released: 2018; Format: CD, digital download; Label: Chris Wilson (Forge 006) | — |

=== Live albums ===
List of live albums, with selected details and chart positions
| Title | Album details | Peak chart positions |
| Title | Album details | AUS |
|---|---|---|
| Live at the Continental | Released: September 1994; Format: CD, cassette; Label: Aurora (D19852) | 19 |
| Box of Blues (with Geoff Achison) | Released: 2012; Format: CD, Download; Label: Jupiter II (GRACD16) | — |
| Blow These Tracks: Live on The Blues Train (Mr Black & Blues featuring Chris Wilson) | Released: Late 2012; Format: CD, digital download; Label: Breakneck (MJP1202) | — |
| Chris Wilson Live at Cherry | Released: 2013; Format: CD, digital download; Label: Forge (FORGE 005) | — |

=== Singles ===
List of singles, with selected chart positions
| Title | Year | Peak chart positions | Album |
| Title | Year | AUS | Album |
|---|---|---|---|
| "The Big One" | 1992 | 143 | Landlocked |
| "Alimony Blues" | 1992 | — | Landlocked |
| "I Can't Stand the Rain" (as Wilson Diesel) | 1996 | 66 | Short Cool Ones |
| "Strange Love" (as Wilson Diesel) | 1996 | — | Short Cool Ones |
| "Shoot Out. Hand Becomes Fist" | 1998 | — | The Long Weekend |

== Awards and nominations ==
=== ARIA Music Awards ===
The ARIA Music Awards is an annual awards ceremony that recognises excellence, innovation, and achievement across all genres of Australian music.

| Year | Nominee / work | Award | Result |
|---|---|---|---|
| 1993 | Landlocked | Best Male Artist | Nominated |
| 1993 | Landlocked | Breakthrough Artist – Album | Nominated |
| 1995 | Live at the Continental | Best Male Artist | Nominated |
| 1998 | The Long Weekend | Best Male Artist | Nominated |

=== Blues Music Victoria Inc ===
On 30 October 2019, Wilson was inducted into the Blues Music Victoria Inc Hall of Fame as the 2019 Peoples Choice, Victorian Blues Legend

| Year | Nominee / work | Award | Result |
|---|---|---|---|
| 2020 | himself | Hall of Fame inductee (Peoples Choice, Victorian Blues Legend) | inductee |

=== Music Victoria Awards ===
The Music Victoria Awards is an annual awards ceremony celebrating Victorian music. In 2020, Wilson was inducted into its Hall of Fame.

| Year | Nominee / work | Award | Result |
|---|---|---|---|
| 2013 | Box of Blues (with Geoff Achison) | Best Blues Albums | Nominated |
| 2020 | himself | Hall of Fame inductee | inductee |
