= Never Miss Your Water =

1993 single by Diesel

Single by Diesel

from the album The Lobbyist
- B-side: "Picture of You"
- Released: 28 June 1993
- Recorded: Air (UK)
- Length: 3:54
- Label: EMI
- Songwriters: Diesel, John Daniel Tate
- Producer: Diesel

Diesel singles chronology
"One More Time" (1992)	"Never Miss Your Water" (1993)	"Masterplan" (1993)

"Never Miss Your Water" is a song by Australian rock musician Diesel. It was released as the first single from his second studio album, The Lobbyist (1993), in June 1993. The song charted at number 12 in Australia and number 17 in New Zealand. At the ARIA Music Awards of 1994, the song was nominated for three awards: Single of the Year, Song of the Year, and Producer of the Year, losing in all cases to "The Honeymoon Is Over" by the Cruel Sea. At the APRA Awards of 1994, the song won the APRA Award for Most Performed Australian Work.

== Track listing ==
- CD single
1. "Never Miss Your Water" – 3:54
2. "Picture of You" – 4:36

== Charts ==
=== Weekly charts ===
Chart (1993)	Peak position
Australia (ARIA)	12
New Zealand (Recorded Music NZ)	17

=== Year-end charts ===
Chart (1993)	Position
Australia (ARIA)	77
