= Masterplan (song) =

1993 single by Diesel

Single by Johnny Diesel

from the album The Lobbyist
- B-side: "Too Much of a Good Thing"
- Released: 30 August 1993
- Length: 5:19
- Label: EMI
- Songwriter(s): Diesel
- Producer(s): Diesel, Don Gehman

Johnny Diesel singles chronology
"Never Miss Your Water" (1993)	"Masterplan" (1993)	"I've Been Loving You Too Long" (1993)

"Masterplan" is a song by Australian rock musician, Diesel. It was released as the second single from his second studio album, The Lobbyist (1993), and peaked at number 42 in Australia in November 1993.

== Track listing ==
Australian CD single

1. "Masterplan" – 5:19
2. "Too Much of a Good Thing" – 4:19

== Weekly charts ==
Chart (1993)	Peak position
Australia (ARIA)	42
