= All Come Together =

1994 single by Diesel

Single by Diesel

from the album Solid State Rhyme
- B-side: "P&H Children"
- Released: 17 October 1994
- Recorded: Freight Train, Bowral, Festival, Studios 301 (Sydney, Australia)
- Length: 4:09
- Label: EMI
- Songwriters: Diesel, Guy Davies
- Producers: Diesel, Craig Porteils

Diesel singles chronology
"Still Got a Long Way to Go" (1994)	"All Come Together" (1994)	"15 Feet of Snow" (1995)

“All Come Together” is a song by Australian rock musician Diesel. The song was released as the first single from his third studio album, Solid State Rhyme. The song peaked at number 17 in Australia and number 33 in Iceland. A percentage of the sales of the single was donated to World Vision.

== Track listing ==
CD single

1. "All Come Together" (4:09)
2. "P&H Children" (3:45)

CD Maxi

1. "All Come Together" (4:09)
2. "P&H Children" (3:45)
3. "Get Lucky" (live version)
4. "One More Time" (acoustic)

== Personnel ==
- Backing Vocals – Venetta Fields
- Congas [Congos] – Rick Kugler
- Drums, Percussion – Kane Baker
- Piano, Organ [Hammond B3] – Rob Woolf

== Chart performance ==
"All Come Together" debuted at number 24 in Australia before peaking at number 17 in November 1994.

=== Weekly charts ===
Chart (1994–1995)	Peak position
Australia (ARIA)	17
Iceland (Íslenski Listinn Topp 40)	33
