= 15 Feet of Snow =

1995 single by Diesel

Single by Diesel

from the album Solid State Rhyme
- B-side: "Can We Get Closer"; "A.N.O.M.L."
- Released: 6 February 1995
- Recorded: Freight Train, Studios 301 (Sydney, Australia)
- Length: 4:35
- Label: EMI
- Songwriter: Diesel
- Producers: Diesel, Craig Porteils

Diesel singles chronology
"All Come Together" (1994)	"15 Feet of Snow" (1995)	"Get It On" (1995)

"15 Feet of Snow" is a song by Australian rock musician Diesel. It was released in February 1995 as the second single from his third studio album, Solid State Rhyme (1994). It peaked at number 29 in Australia in April 1995.

== Track listing ==
CD single

1. "15 Feet of Snow" – 4:35
2. "Can We Get Closer" – 5:17
3. "A.N.O.M.L." – 3:59

== Charts ==
Chart (1995)	Peak position
Australia (ARIA)	29
