= Diesel (musician) =

Australian singer and guitarist (born 1966)

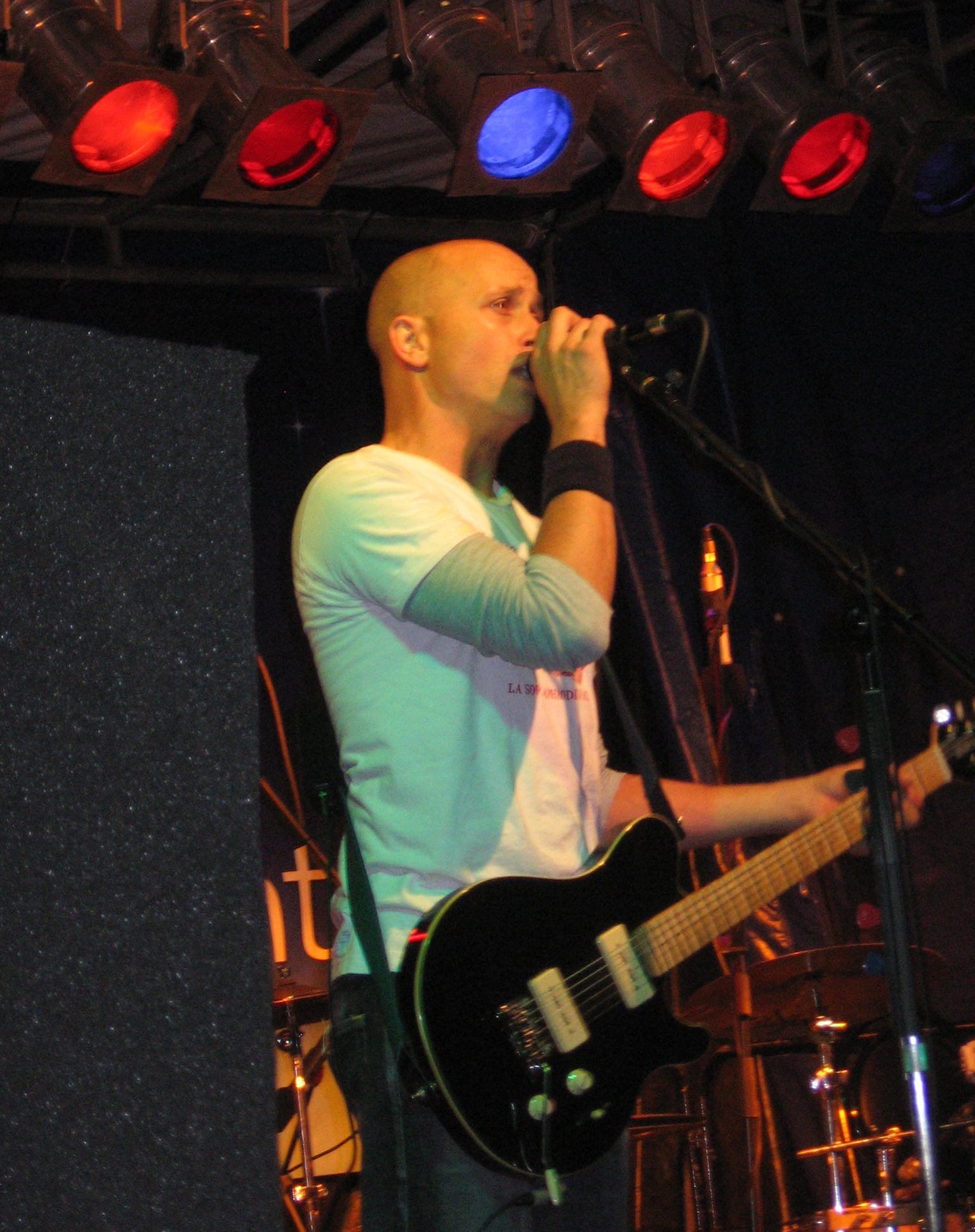
- Diesel performing in 2006 at The Rocks Night Market

Background information
- Also known as: Diesel; Johnny Diesel; Mark Lizotte
- Born: Mark Denis Lizotte; 31 May 1966 (age 60); Fall River, Massachusetts, U.S.
- Origin: Perth, Western Australia, Australia
- Genres: Rock; blues
- Occupations: Singer-songwriter; musician
- Instruments: Vocals; guitar
- Years active: 1982–present
- Labels: Chrysalis; EMI; Mammoth; Liberation Music
- Formerly of: Innocent Bystanders; Johnny Diesel & the Injectors
- Website: dieselmusic.com.au

Mark Denis Lizotte (born 31 May 1966) is an American-born Australian singer-songwriter and musician, who has released material under the name Diesel, Johnny Diesel, as leader of band Johnny Diesel & the Injectors, and as a solo performer, as well as under his birth name. Two of his albums reached No. 1 on the Australian Recording Industry Association (ARIA) Albums Charts, Hepfidelity in 1992 and The Lobbyist in 1993.

Since 1987, he has played on albums by his brother-in-law, Australian rock singer, Jimmy Barnes. Although better known as a singer-songwriter and guitarist, Lizotte is also competent on guitar; and has also produced an album by Richard Clapton and one by Vika and Linda Bull. He has won six ARIA Music Awards with three for 'Best Male Artist' in 1993, 1994 and 1995.

== Career ==
=== 1966–1986: Early years and Innocent Bystanders ===
Diesel was born on 31 May 1966 in Fall River, Massachusetts, United States, and emigrated to Australia with his family, in November 1971. His father, Henry Bertram Lizotte (born 19 June 1929), and his mother, Theresa Rita (née Morin, born 18 January 1930) were parents of Jeannine, Bruce, Michael, Laura, Donna, Brian and Mark. After they arrived in Sydney, his father purchased a station wagon and the family drove down the Hume Highway and settled in Albury, New South Wales. Later moving to Perth, Western Australia, where he later had a job pouring petrol—an experience that provided inspiration for his music. Henry Lizotte was a professional saxophonist performing in the US and Australia, Diesel and his siblings were surrounded by music from an early age. While his siblings became teachers, Diesel eventually settled on electric guitar as his main instrument. He later recalled a time in Year 8 (c. 1979) at Scarborough Senior High School when he decided on a musical career: "I was trying to get my head around algebra [...] and suddenly I thought: 'Hang on, I don't have to do this. I can play music as a job!'".

During his school days at Scarborough, he joined a newly formed band by Duncan Andrews named "Dark Spot". The band was Diesel's first. Andrews was on bass, with Bill Advic on electric rhythm guitar and Diesel on lead guitar. While the band was without a vocalist for some time, each tried out for the vocalist spot but it was thought that no one could sing well enough. In 1981, Dark Spot entered the battle of the band competition in Fremantle with an original song penned by Andrews with Andrews on vocals and bass. The band took home first place, largely due to the combination of Andrews' vocals and Diesel's guitar work.

In his mid-teens, Diesel (as Mark Lizotte) performed with The Kind and Close Action. The Kind had Diesel with Denise DeMarchi, Suze DeMarchi, Dean Denton, Gary Dunn, John 'Yak' Sherrit and Boyd Wilson. Close Action included Diesel on guitar, Bernie Bremond on saxophone, John Heussenstamm on guitar and Sherrit on drums. In 1983, he joined Innocent Bystanders, a Perth pub rock band, and they released a single, "Lebanon", in 1984, with the line-up of Diesel, John "Tatt" Dalzell on bass guitar, Brett Keyser on vocals, Cliff Kinneen on keyboards and Sherrit on drums. Innocent Bystanders travelled to Sydney to record their second single, "Dangerous", released in July 1986. They had attracted the attention of hard rockers, The Angels, and went on to record another single and an album, Don't Go Looking Back, which was released later in 1986, however, Diesel had already left the band.

=== 1986–1991: Band: Johnny Diesel & the Injectors ===
By June 1986, Diesel was back in Perth and had split from Innocent Bystanders leaving fellow member Ross Watson but taking Bremond, Dalzell and Sherritt, and they formed Johnny Diesel & the Injectors with George Dalstrom as a second guitarist. The band played a mixture of R&B, blues and Southern rock; they developed a local following in Perth but decided to relocate to Sydney in September 1987. Dalstrom left by the end of 1986.

According to music journalist, Ed Nimmervoll, the name Johnny Diesel was either from Lizotte's days as a petrol dispenser or from a corruption of John Dalzell's name being misapplied to him as the lead singer. As explained by Lizotte, the real story is that the band's name was never meant to be permanent; it came about as the result of a casual joke concerning the band's bass player, John Dalzell. "John had one kid and another on the way," Mark explains. "A friend of ours used to refer to them as 'Johnny Diesel and his little injectors'; I thought it was funny. Then I got a call from the woman from the [Perth] venue where we were playing one night a week... 'You're starting to draw a few people,' she said. 'I'm going to put an ad in the paper, does this nameless band have a name?' I told her we were 'Johnny Diesel and the Injectors'. It was just a joke. I wanted it to appear in the newspaper to amuse John Dalzell but the name stuck. When we got to Sydney, our Management said, 'Everyone will think you're Johnny Diesel. Are you going to go along with it?' I wasn't going to be stuck-in-the-mud, so I said, yeah. Whatever... fine".

Johnny Diesel & the Injectors moved to Sydney in September after taking up management by Brent Eccles, drummer for The Angels. The group began playing support shows for The Choirboys and The Radiators. They came to the attention of Jane Barnes, wife of hard rocker, Jimmy Barnes (ex-Cold Chisel), and through her recommendation, Diesel was hired to work on Barnes' third solo album, Freight Train Heart. When Barnes took to the road to tour the album in November, Diesel was retained as lead guitarist, while Johnny Diesel & the Injectors were the opening act. It was the beginning of a long and ongoing relationship between Diesel and Barnes. The relationship would later become personal as well as professional, with Diesel and Barnes becoming brothers-in-law after Diesel married Jep (Jane Barnes' sister) in 1989.

Diesel's band signed with Chrysalis Records and their eponymous debut album, Johnny Diesel & the Injectors, was recorded in Memphis, Tennessee with producer Terry Manning from August 1988 and released in March 1989. The album reached No. 2 on the Australian Recording Industry Association (ARIA) Albums Charts. The first single "Don't Need Love" was issued ahead of the album in October 1988 and peaked at No. 10 on the ARIA Singles Charts. The second single, "Soul Revival", appeared in February 1989 and reached No. 9, while the third single, "Cry In Shame" also peaked at No. 10 in May. In all, five singles were released from Johnny Diesel & the Injectors, while "Looking for Love" was also a Top 40 hit, the final single "Since I Fell for You" was a chart failure as it peaked only at No. 83.

While touring United Kingdom in mid-1989, they broadcast a live performance on 14 May by BBC Radio 1 for the Tommy Vance Sessions, produced by Tony Wilson. The recording was released as a four-track EP, Live in London, in August and appeared in the ARIA top 30.

At the ARIA Music Awards early in 1990, Johnny Diesel & the Injectors won the award for 'Highest Selling Album' (with more than 280,000 copies sold). Diesel appeared on Barnes' live album, Barnestorming in 1989 and worked with Barnes on his studio album, Two Fires, during 1990. In the meantime, the only recording from Johnny Diesel & the Injectors for the year was a cover of Percy Mayfield's "Please Send Me Someone to Love" for the soundtrack to the Kylie Minogue film The Delinquents. The single reached No. 11 on the ARIA singles chart Diesel decided to go solo and disbanded the group in early 1991.

=== 1991–1997: Commercial success ===
In August 1991, as Johnny Diesel, his solo career was launched with the single "Love Junk", which peaked in the top 20. Diesel toured Australia with Barnes during the second half of the year. He had signed with EMI Music Australia and his second single, "Come to Me", was released in November under the epithet Diesel—subsequent releases saw him billed as Diesel until 1998—which reached No. 8 on the singles charts. November also saw the release of Barnes' next album, Soul Deep, with Diesel on guitar and also duetting on the Sam Cooke cover "Bring It On Home to Me". Diesel left his management team of Eccles and John Woodruff. He undertook his solo Rock 'n' Soul Tour, early in 1992, with Yak Sherrit on drums, Leslie Barlow on backing vocals, Matthew Branton on bass guitar, Jim Hilbun on rhythm guitar (ex-The Angels) and Roger Mason on keyboards (Models).

His next release, "Tip of My Tongue", appeared in February 1992, reaching No. 4 and becoming his highest-charting single. It was followed a month later by his debut solo album, Hepfidelity, produced by Don Gehman and Manning, recorded in Los Angeles and Memphis. The album peaked at No. 1 on the ARIA charts and went on to sell more than 200,000 copies. A further two singles were issued, " Man Alive", in May, which reached the top 20, and "One More Time" in August, which did not enter the top 50. Diesel won ARIA awards for 'Best Album' and 'Best Male Artist' in 1993 from four nominations.

The Lobbyist was a mix of new songs, re-workings of some Hepfidelity tracks and a couple of covers. Released in August 1993, it also hit No. 1 on the Australian charts, and Diesel won an ARIA award for 'Best Male Artist' again, in 1994. The album spawned three singles: "Never Miss Your Water" in July peaked at #12, "Masterplan" in October and "I've Been Loving You Too Long" in January 1994.

In May 1994, the Still Got a Long Way to Go four-song EP was released credited to Jimmy Barnes with Diesel, the title track being lifted from Barnes' 1993 album Flesh and Wood. This made No. 57 on the Australian charts, just outside the Top 50. Diesel's next album, Solid State Rhyme, appeared in November and featured the singles "All Come Together" (top 20), "Fifteen Feet of Snow" (top 30) and "Get it On". Solid State Rhyme was co-produced by Diesel and Craig Porteils—it was another commercial success, peaking at No. 10. He won the ARIA award for 'Best Male Artist' in 1995—for the third consecutive time.

Early in 1996, Diesel recorded the album Short Cool Ones with Melbourne blues musician Chris Wilson as Wilson Diesel, released in February. The project also featured drummer Angus Diggs, bass player Dean Addison and Bob Woolf on keyboards. Diesel supplied guitar, backing vocals and production skills on Richard Clapton's Angeltown, released in May. Following record production, guitar, backing vocals and songwriting work on Vika and Linda's Princess Tabu album, released in October, Diesel went on hiatus. A greatest hits compilation Rewind – The Best Of also appeared in October. By year's end, he had moved to New York City, with his young family.

To this point in his career, Diesel has sold over 800,000 records in Australia and won nine awards.

=== 1998–2010: Mark Lizotte and continued success ===
In June 1998, Diesel signed with Mammoth Records under his birth name, Mark Lizotte. He returned briefly to Australia in November to perform at the Mushroom 25 Live concert alongside Wilson, Barnes and Vika and Linda. He made a comeback to the Australian charts with his October 1999 album, Soul Lost Companion, which reached the top 20 and spawned the singles, "Dig" (top 20) and "Satellite". He returned to live in Australia in 2002, and released his next album Hear, under the Diesel moniker, in October.

In March 2004 Diesel filmed his performance at Sydney's Metro Theatre and released his first DVD titled The First Fifteen '89–'04 Live. It went on to reach gold status.

On 10 October 2004, Andrew Denton interviewed Barnes on the ABC TV program Enough Rope, Diesel then performed with Barnes and his children, Eliza Jane, Jackie and Elly-May. Around the same time, Diesel released Singled Out. An entirely acoustic overview of his career, it earned an ARIA nomination. Over the same period, he also worked with Barnes on his Double Happiness album, including a duet on the track "Got You as a Friend" and providing musical backing including guitar, drums, bass guitar, percussion and keyboards on various tracks.

In 2006, Diesel released Coathanger Antennae, an album recorded in two months. Of it, he said "We approached it like the Stones or The Beatles used to do where we'd just put down a few takes live and then picked the ones that we all felt good about", emphasising the focus on live recording rather than studio polishing.

Diesel made guest appearances on the Australian leg of Dweezil Zappa's 2009 Zappa Plays Zappa Tour, playing guitar and vocals after Ray White's departure from Zappa's group.

The year 2008 saw the release of the studio album "Days Like These". The album peaked at number 17 in Australia.

3 July 2009 saw the release of Project Blues: Saturday Suffering Fools, a blues album featuring a horn section made up of ex-Injector Bernie Bremond and family members Hank (Father) and brothers Michael and Brian Lizotte. Brian owned a theatre bar (under the name "Lizotte's") in the Newcastle suburb of Lambton, at which Diesel has played. Brian sold the theatre in 2023.

=== 2011–2020: 30 years and Sunset Suburbia ===
4 July 2011 saw the release of "Under the Influence" – a collection of Diesel's favourite and influential guitar music featuring tracks by Jimi Hendrix, Link Wray, Albert King, Neil Young and The Sonics. "I was doing these shows called 'Under the Influence' just for fun" says Diesel. "One night it would be Jimi Hendrix or Al Green and then another night I'd do the three Kings (Albert, Freddie and B.B)" he adds. "I thought it would be good to make a record like that."

A "hand-picked" retrospective album spanning 20 years of recordings titled You Get There from Here was released on 1 June 2012.

Diesel made his scoring debut in 2012 with six-part series Bikies Wars: Brothers in Arms, contributing the theme track "Highway Mind" and over 140 original score pieces. The first episode aired on Tuesday 15 May 2012. Diesel's real name Mark Lizotte is listed in the credits.

Diesel's eleventh album Let It Fly was released on 9 August 2013. "It's all of my life's work so far brought to fruition, in many ways. It's pretty encompassing," he said. "There's a lot of stuff I've never tried before either – like, there are folk elements that are quite different for me ... I guess when you start using mandolin and fiddle, it's gonna happen!"

In 2016, Diesel commenced the "Pieces of Americana" tour and released Americana on 1 July, which debuted at number 15 on the ARIA chart.

In 2018, Diesel celebrated 30 years in the industry with the release of a 30-track compilation album, 30: The Greatest Hits as well as national tour titled Give Me Saturday Night.

In mid-2019 Diesel announced the release of a Sunset Suburbia trilogy. It consisted of two EPs, leading to a studio album in 2020. Two singles lifted from the two EPs were released in 2019, and the album was released in August 2020.

=== 2021–present: Alone with Blues ===
In May 2021, Diesel released "Six Steel Strings", the lead single from his album, Alone with Blues, released on 16 July 2021. The album peaked at number 20 on the ARIA chart. During 2022 he presented a 12-part TV documentary series Days Like These with Diesel, with each episode describing a pivotal concert by Australian artists: Jet, Baby Animals, Hunters & Collectors, the Angels, Diesel, Rose Tattoo, Jimmy Barnes, Eurogliders, Archie Roach, Icehouse, Troy Cassar-Daley and Cold Chisel.

== Discography ==
- Johnny Diesel and The Injectors (1989)
- Hepfidelity (1992)
- The Lobbyist (1993)
- Solid State Rhyme (1994)
- Short Cool Ones (1996) (by Wilson Diesel)
- Soul Lost Companion (1999)
- Hear (2002)
- Coathanger Antennae (2006)
- Days Like These (2008)
- Project Blues: Saturday Suffering Fools (2009)
- Under the Influence (2011)
- Let It Fly (2013)
- Americana (2016)
- Sunset Suburbia (2020)
- Alone with Blues (2021)
- Bootleg Melancholy (2023)

== Awards and nominations ==
=== ARIA Music Awards ===
The ARIA Music Awards is an annual awards ceremony that recognises excellence, innovation, and achievement across all genres of Australian music, which began in 1987.

Year	Category	Nominated work	Result	Ref.
1989	Breakthrough Artist – Single	"Don't Need Love"	Nominated	
1989	Best New Talent	"Don't Need Love"	Won	
1990	Breakthrough Artist – Album	Johnny Diesel and the Injectors	Nominated	
1990	Highest Selling Album	Johnny Diesel and the Injectors	Won	
1990	Best Group	Johnny Diesel and the Injectors	Nominated	
1993	Album of the Year	Hepfidelity	Won	
1993	Best Cover Art	Hepfidelity	Nominated	
1993	Best Male Artist	Hepfidelity	Won	
1993	Highest Selling Album	Hepfidelity	Nominated	
1993	Single of the Year	"Tip of my Tongue"	Nominated	
1993	Song of the Year	"Tip of my Tongue"	Nominated	
1994	Best Male Artist	The Lobbyist	Won	
1994	Album of the Year	The Lobbyist	Nominated	
1994	Single of the Year	"Never Miss Your Water"	Nominated	
1994	Song of the Year	"Never Miss Your Water"	Nominated	
1994	Producer of the Year	"Never Miss Your Water"	Nominated	
1995	Best Male Artist	Solid State Rhyme	Won	
1996	Best Male Artist	Short Cool Ones	Nominated	
2003	Best Independent Release	Hear	Nominated	
2004	Best Adult Contemporary Album	Singled Out	Nominated	

=== APRA Awards ===
The APRA Awards are held in Australia and New Zealand by the Australasian Performing Right Association to recognise songwriting skills, sales and airplay performance by its members annually.

Year	Nominee / work	Award	Result	Ref.
1994	"Never Miss Your Water"	Most Performed Australian Work	Won	
2020	"By the Scars"	Song of the Year	Shortlisted	
2023	"Around in Circles" (Jimmy Barnes, Jane Barnes & Mark Lizotte)	Most Performed Rock Work	Nominated	
