= Rewind – The Best Of =

Rewind – The Best of Diesel

Greatest hits album by Diesel
- Released: 21 October 1996
- Recorded: 1988–1994
- Genre: Soft rock, blues, pop rock
- Length: 47:53
- Label: Chrysalis, EMI
- Producer: Diesel, Craig Porteils, Don Gehman, Terry Manning

Diesel chronology
| Short Cool Ones (1996) | Rewind – The Best of Diesel (1996) | Soul Lost Companion (1999) |

Rewind – The Best of Diesel (styled as bniwer the best of diesel with "rewind" in mirror writing) is a greatest hits album by Australian rock musician, Diesel (a.k.a. Johnny Diesel, Mark Lizotte) who previously fronted Johnny Diesel & the Injectors. The album was released in October 1996 via EMI.

It includes tracks from four albums: Johnny Diesel and The Injectors (1989), Hepfidelity (1992), The Lobbyist (1993) and Solid State Rhyme (1994). It was issued in the United States on 25 May 2003.

== Track listing ==
| No. | Title | Writer(s) | Album | Length |
|---|---|---|---|---|
| 1. | "Never Miss Your Water" | Diesel; John Daniel Tate | The Lobbyist | 3:54 |
| 2. | "Tip Of My Tongue" | Diesel; Tate | Hepfidelity | 4:12 |
| 3. | "All Come Together" | Diesel; Guy Davies | Solid State Rhyme | 4:36 |
| 4. | "15 Feet of Snow" | Diesel | Solid State Rhyme | 5:16 |
| 5. | "Love Junk" | Diesel | Hepfidelity | 3:46 |
| 6. | "Masterplan" | Diesel | The Lobbyist | 5:17 |
| 7. | "I've Been Loving You Too Long" | Jerry Butler; Otis Redding | The Lobbyist | 3:51 |
| 8. | "Get It On" | Diesel | Solid State Rhyme | 3:01 |
| 9. | "Come to Me" (UK remix) | Diesel | Hepfidelity | 4:25 |
| 10. | "Man Alive" | Diesel; Tom DeLuca | Hepfidelity | 4:48 |
| 11. | "One More Time" | Diesel; Jerry Lynn Williams | Hepfidelity | 4:03 |
| 12. | "Please Send Me Someone to Love" | Percy Mayfield | The Delinquents | 4:16 |
| 13. | "Don't Need Love" | Diesel | Johnny Diesel and the Injectors | 4:08 |
| 14. | "Soul Revival" | Diesel | Johnny Diesel and the Injectors | 4:02 |
| 15. | "Lookin' for Love" | Diesel | Johnny Diesel and the Injectors | 3:26 |
| 16. | "Cry in Shame" | Diesel | Johnny Diesel and the Injectors | 4:38 |

Note: Tracks 13 to 16 were originally by Johnny Diesel & The Injectors, but are not credited as such on this release.

== Certifications ==
| Region | Certification | Certified units/sales |
|---|---|---|
| Australia (ARIA) | Gold | 35,000^{^} |
^{^} Shipments figures based on certification alone.
