= Why Does Love Do This to Me: The Exponents Greatest Hits =

Why Does Love Do This To Me: The Exponents Greatest Hits

Greatest hits album by The Exponents
- Released: November 2011
- Recorded: 1982–2011
- Genre: Rock
- Length: 80:15
- Label: Universal Music New Zealand

The Exponents chronology
Sex and Agriculture: The Very Best of The Exponents (2005)	Why Does Love Do This To Me: The Exponents Greatest Hits (2011)	Eight Days at Roundhead (2013)

Alternative cover
- The 2013 re-release of the group's Greatest Hits album was bundled with a copy of their 2013 album Eight Days at Roundhead and came in an O Card with a new cover.

Singles from Why Does Love Do This To Me
- 1. "It's Rugby" Released: 2011

Why Does Love Do This To Me: The Exponents Greatest Hits is a greatest hits collection by the New Zealand band The Exponents, released in November 2011 to mark the group's 30th anniversary. It includes the track "It's Rugby", which was recorded specifically for the album. The album reached number 31 on the New Zealand music charts. In May 2013, Universal Music released a deluxe edition of the album with a new cover and bundled with The Exponents' Eight Days at Roundhead album on both digital and CD formats.

== Track listing ==
All tracks are written by Jordan Luck except where noted.

CD / digital release
No.	Title	Writer(s)	Original release	Length
1.	"Do You Feel In Love"		Non-album single (1996)	2:44
2.	"Why Does Love Do This To Me"		Something Beginning with C (1992)	3:25
3.	"Christchurch (In Cashel St. I Wait)"	Luck; Brian Jones; David Gent	Expectations (1985)	4:16
4.	"Know Your Own Heart"		Prayers Be Answered (1983)	3:29
5.	"One in a Lifetime"	Luck; Dave Barraclough	Better Never Than Late (1997)	3:38
6.	"Whatever Happened to Tracey"	Luck; Chris Sheehan	Something Beginning with C (1992)	2:49
7.	"All I Can Do"		Prayers Be Answered (1983)	2:41
8.	"It's Rugby"	Luck; Bryan Bell	Previously unreleased	2:41
9.	"Caroline Skies"		Amplifier (1986)	3:19
10.	"Sink Like a Stone"		Something Beginning with C (1992)	2:21
11.	"Sex & Agriculture"	Luck; Jones	Original single (1984)	3:41
12.	"Your Best Friend Loves Me Too"		Prayers Be Answered (1983)	2:39
13.	"Like She Said"		Grassy Knoll (1994)	3:09
14.	"Only I Could Die (and Love You Still)"	Luck; Sheehan	Amplifier (1986)	4:30
15.	"Victoria" (single version)		Original single (1982)	3:26
16.	"Greater Hopes, Greater Expectations"		Expectations (1985)	4:03
17.	"Erotic" (7″ edit)		Something Beginning with C (1992)	3:54
18.	"Change Your Mind"		Better Never Than Late (1997)	3:31
19.	"Who Loves Who the Most"		Something Beginning with C (1992)	4:14
20.	"La La Lulu"	Barraclough	Once Bitten, Twice Bitten (1995)	3:00
21.	"Close" (radio edit)		Better Never Than Late (1997)	3:46
22.	"Airway Spies"		Non-album single (1982)	2:48
23.	"Summer You Never Meant"	Luck; Barraclough	Once Bitten, Twice Bitten (1995)	3:21
24.	"I'll Say Goodbye (Even Though I'm Blue)"		Prayers Be Answered (1983)	2:50
Total length:				80:15

== Charts ==
Chart (2011–12)	Peak position
New Zealand Albums (RMNZ)	26
