= Sex and Agriculture: The Very Best of The Exponents =

Sex & Agriculture: The Very Best Of The Exponents

Greatest hits album by The Exponents
- Released: November 2005
- Recorded: 1982–2005
- Genre: Rock
- Length: 120:40
- Label: Universal Music New Zealand
- Producer: Various

The Exponents chronology
Hello, Love You, Goodbye (1999)	Sex & Agriculture: The Very Best Of The Exponents (2005)	Why Does Love Do This to Me: The Exponents Greatest Hits (2011)

Sex & Agriculture: The Very Best of The Exponents is a greatest hits collection by the New Zealand band The Exponents, released in November 2005. This two CD set has their hit singles on the first disc and a collection of B-sides and rarities on the second disc. The album reached #7 and spent 15 weeks on the New Zealand Album chart. It included two new recordings, "Geraldine" and "Or A Girl I Knew", which were produced by Neil Finn at Roundhead Studios in Auckland.

== Track listing ==
All tracks are written by Jordan Luck except where noted.

=== Sex (The Hits) ===
Disc one
No.	Title	Writer(s)	Original release	Length
1.	"Victoria"		Original single (1982)	3:26
2.	"Airway Spies"		Original single (1982)	2:48
3.	"All I Can Do"		Prayers Be Answered (1983)	2:41
4.	"Know Your Own Heart"		Prayers Be Answered	3:29
5.	"Your Best Friend Loves Me Too"		Prayers Be Answered	2:39
6.	"I'll Say Goodbye (Even Though I'm Blue)"		Prayers Be Answered	2:39
7.	"Sex & Agriculture"		Original single (1984)	3:41
8.	"Christchurch (In Cashel St. I Wait)"	Luck; Brian Jones; David Gent	Expectations (1985)	4:16
9.	"My Love for You"	Luck; Jones	Expectations	3:23
10.	"Only I Could Die (and Love You Still)"	Luck; Chris Sheehan	Amplifier (1986)	4:30
11.	"Caroline Skies"		Amplifier	3:19
12.	"Why Does Love Do This to Me?"		Something Beginning with C (1992)	3:25
13.	"Who Loves Who the Most"		Something Beginning with C	4:14
14.	"Whatever Happened to Tracey"	Luck; Sheehan	Something Beginning with C	2:49
15.	"Sink Like a Stone"		Something Beginning with C	2:21
16.	"Like She Said"		Grassy Knoll (1994)	3:09
17.	"La La Lulu"	Dave Barraclough	Once Bitten, Twice Bitten (1995)	3:00
18.	"Geraldine"	Luck; Jones	Previously unreleased	3:28
19.	"Or a Girl I Knew"		Previously unreleased	2:43
Total length:				62:00

=== Agriculture (Hidden Gems) ===
Disc two
No.	Title	Writer(s)	Length
1.	"It Means I Mean You"	Luck; Jones	3:53
2.	"Fuck"	Luck; Sheehan	2:31
3.	"Interesting Thing"		2:34
4.	"What's Left of Love"		2:55
5.	"Are You Sure?"		3:23
6.	"Close"		2:52
7.	"Hey Girl Groove!"		4:13
8.	"Only Virtually Mine"		2:43
9.	"So This Is Love"	Phil Judd	3:47
10.	"Sadness"		2:36
11.	"One Sad River"		3:47
12.	"Do You Feel In Love"		2:44
13.	"Helen"		4:33
14.	"Galaxy"	Luck; Barraclough	2:33
15.	"Blue River Rising"		3:17
16.	"Poland" (original version)		2:29
17.	"My Date with You Was a Date with No One" (live)		3:44
18.	"Perfect Romance" (live)		2:46
19.	"It Didn't and It Does"		3:53
Total length:			58:40

== Charts ==
Chart (2005–06)	Peak position
New Zealand Albums (RMNZ)	7
