= List of number-one albums from the 1990s (New Zealand) =

The following lists the number one albums on the New Zealand Albums Chart during the 1990s. The source for this decade is the Recording Industry Association of New Zealand.

== 1990 ==
Key
‡ – Album of New Zealand origin

Week	Title	Artist
7 January 1990	Summer break – no chart	Summer break – no chart
14 January 1990	All or Nothing – The US Remix Album	Milli Vanilli
21 January 1990	...But Seriously	Phil Collins
28 January 1990	...But Seriously	Phil Collins
4 February 1990	...But Seriously	Phil Collins
11 February 1990	...But Seriously	Phil Collins
18 February 1990	...But Seriously	Phil Collins
25 February 1990	Cosmic Thing	The B-52's
4 March 1990	All or Nothing – The US Remix Album	Milli Vanilli
11 March 1990	Sleeping with the Past	Elton John
18 March 1990	Sleeping with the Past	Elton John
25 March 1990	Blue Sky Mining	Midnight Oil
1 April 1990	Blue Sky Mining	Midnight Oil
8 April 1990	Labour of Love II	UB40
15 April 1990	Labour of Love II	UB40
22 April 1990	Easter holiday – no chart	Easter holiday – no chart
29 April 1990	I Do Not Want What I Haven't Got	Sinéad O'Connor
6 May 1990	I Do Not Want What I Haven't Got	Sinéad O'Connor
13 May 1990	I Do Not Want What I Haven't Got	Sinéad O'Connor
20 May 1990	I Do Not Want What I Haven't Got	Sinéad O'Connor
27 May 1990	Skid Row	Skid Row
3 June 1990	Skid Row	Skid Row
10 June 1990	Skid Row	Skid Row
17 June 1990	Skid Row	Skid Row
24 June 1990	Submarine Bells^{‡}	The Chills
1 July 1990	Submarine Bells^{‡}	The Chills
8 July 1990	Step by Step	New Kids on the Block
15 July 1990	Their Greatest Hits	The Carpenters
22 July 1990	Their Greatest Hits	The Carpenters
29 July 1990	Their Greatest Hits	The Carpenters
5 August 1990	Their Greatest Hits	The Carpenters
12 August 1990	Their Greatest Hits	The Carpenters
19 August 1990	Their Greatest Hits	The Carpenters
26 August 1990	Their Greatest Hits	The Carpenters
2 September 1990	Together Again^{‡}	Gray Bartlett, Jodi Vaughan, Brendan Dugan
9 September 1990	Cuts Both Ways	Gloria Estefan
16 September 1990	Cuts Both Ways	Gloria Estefan
23 September 1990	Cuts Both Ways	Gloria Estefan
30 September 1990	Moonlight Sax^{‡}	Brian Smith
7 October 1990	Moonlight Sax^{‡}	Brian Smith
14 October 1990	Moonlight Sax^{‡}	Brian Smith
21 October 1990	The Very Best of Cat Stevens	Cat Stevens
28 October 1990	The Very Best of Cat Stevens	Cat Stevens
4 November 1990	Carreras Domingo Pavarotti in Concert	José Carreras, Plácido Domingo and Luciano Pavarotti with Zubin Mehta
11 November 1990	Carreras Domingo Pavarotti in Concert	José Carreras, Plácido Domingo and Luciano Pavarotti with Zubin Mehta
18 November 1990	Carreras Domingo Pavarotti in Concert	José Carreras, Plácido Domingo and Luciano Pavarotti with Zubin Mehta
25 November 1990	Carreras Domingo Pavarotti in Concert	José Carreras, Plácido Domingo and Luciano Pavarotti with Zubin Mehta
2 December 1990	Carreras Domingo Pavarotti in Concert	José Carreras, Plácido Domingo and Luciano Pavarotti with Zubin Mehta
9 December 1990	The Very Best of Elton John	Elton John
16 December 1990	The Very Best of Elton John	Elton John
23 December 1990	The Very Best of Elton John	Elton John
30 December 1990	Summer break – no chart	Summer break – no chart

== 1991 ==
Key
‡ – Album of New Zealand origin

Week	Title	Artist
6 January 1991	Summer break – no chart	Summer break – no chart
13 January 1991	Summer break – no chart	Summer break – no chart
20 January 1991	The Very Best of Elton John	Elton John
27 January 1991	The Very Best of Elton John	Elton John
3 February 1991	The Very Best of Elton John	Elton John
10 February 1991	The Very Best of Elton John	Elton John
17 February 1991	The Very Best of Elton John	Elton John
24 February 1991	The Very Best of Elton John	Elton John
3 March 1991	The Very Best of the Righteous Brothers: Unchained Melody	The Righteous Brothers
10 March 1991	The Very Best of the Righteous Brothers: Unchained Melody	The Righteous Brothers
17 March 1991	The Very Best of the Righteous Brothers: Unchained Melody	The Righteous Brothers
24 March 1991	The Very Best of the Righteous Brothers: Unchained Melody	The Righteous Brothers
31 March 1991	The Very Best of the Righteous Brothers: Unchained Melody	The Righteous Brothers
7 April 1991	Easter holiday – no chart	Easter holiday – no chart
14 April 1991	The Best of Eagles	Eagles
21 April 1991	Greatest Hits	Eurythmics
28 April 1991	Greatest Hits	Eurythmics
5 May 1991	Greatest Hits	Eurythmics
12 May 1991	Greatest Hits	Eurythmics
19 May 1991	Greatest Hits	Eurythmics
26 May 1991	Greatest Hits	Eurythmics
2 June 1991	Greatest Hits	Eurythmics
9 June 1991	Greatest Hits	Eurythmics
16 June 1991	The Complete Picture: The Very Best of Deborah Harry and Blondie	Deborah Harry and Blondie
23 June 1991	The Complete Picture: The Very Best of Deborah Harry and Blondie	Deborah Harry and Blondie
30 June 1991	20 Greatest Hits	Simon & Garfunkel
7 July 1991	20 Greatest Hits	Simon & Garfunkel
14 July 1991	20 Greatest Hits	Simon & Garfunkel
21 July 1991	20 Greatest Hits	Simon & Garfunkel
28 July 1991	20 Greatest Hits	Simon & Garfunkel
4 August 1991	Warm Your Heart	Aaron Neville
11 August 1991	Warm Your Heart	Aaron Neville
18 August 1991	Warm Your Heart	Aaron Neville
25 August 1991	Metallica	Metallica
1 September 1991	Unforgettable... with Love	Natalie Cole
8 September 1991	Unforgettable... with Love	Natalie Cole
15 September 1991	Unforgettable... with Love	Natalie Cole
22 September 1991	On Every Street	Dire Straits
29 September 1991	Use Your Illusion II	Guns N' Roses
6 October 1991	Use Your Illusion II	Guns N' Roses
13 October 1991	Use Your Illusion II	Guns N' Roses
20 October 1991	Timespace: The Best of Stevie Nicks	Stevie Nicks
27 October 1991	Timespace: The Best of Stevie Nicks	Stevie Nicks
3 November 1991	Timespace: The Best of Stevie Nicks	Stevie Nicks
10 November 1991	Timespace: The Best of Stevie Nicks	Stevie Nicks
17 November 1991	Simply the Best	Tina Turner
24 November 1991	Simply the Best	Tina Turner
1 December 1991	Achtung Baby	U2
8 December 1991	Greatest Hits II	Queen
15 December 1991	Greatest Hits II	Queen
22 December 1991	Greatest Hits II	Queen
29 December 1991	Summer break – no chart	Summer break – no chart

== 1992 ==
Key
‡ – Album of New Zealand origin

Week	Title	Artist
5 January 1992	Summer break – no chart	Summer break – no chart
12 January 1992	Summer break – no chart	Summer break – no chart
19 January 1992	Greatest Hits II	Queen
26 January 1992	The Commitments	Soundtrack
2 February 1992	The Commitments	Soundtrack
9 February 1992	The Commitments	Soundtrack
16 February 1992	The Commitments	Soundtrack
23 February 1992	The Commitments	Soundtrack
1 March 1992	The Commitments	Soundtrack
8 March 1992	The Commitments	Soundtrack
15 March 1992	The Commitments	Soundtrack
22 March 1992	Something Beginning with C^{‡}	The Exponents
29 March 1992	Something Beginning with C^{‡}	The Exponents
5 April 1992	The Commitments	Soundtrack
12 April 1992	The Commitments	Soundtrack
19 April 1992	Adrenalize	Def Leppard
26 April 1992	Woodface^{‡}	Crowded House
3 May 1992	Woodface^{‡}	Crowded House
10 May 1992	Woodface^{‡}	Crowded House
17 May 1992	Woodface^{‡}	Crowded House
24 May 1992	Blood Sugar Sex Magik	Red Hot Chili Peppers
31 May 1992	Hepfidelity	Diesel
7 June 1992	Back to Front	Lionel Richie
14 June 1992	Back to Front	Lionel Richie
21 June 1992	Back to Front	Lionel Richie
28 June 1992	Back to Front	Lionel Richie
5 July 1992	Hepfidelity	Diesel
12 July 1992	Hepfidelity	Diesel
19 July 1992	Completely Hooked – The Best of Dr. Hook	Dr. Hook
26 July 1992	Completely Hooked – The Best of Dr. Hook	Dr. Hook
2 August 1992	Completely Hooked – The Best of Dr. Hook	Dr. Hook
9 August 1992	The Best of Ruby Turner	Ruby Turner
16 August 1992	MTV Unplugged EP	Mariah Carey
23 August 1992	MTV Unplugged EP	Mariah Carey
30 August 1992	MTV Unplugged EP	Mariah Carey
6 September 1992	Unplugged	Eric Clapton
13 September 1992	Unplugged	Eric Clapton
20 September 1992	Unplugged	Eric Clapton
27 September 1992	Unplugged	Eric Clapton
4 October 1992	The Very Best of Supertramp	Supertramp
11 October 1992	Unplugged	Eric Clapton
18 October 1992	Unplugged	Eric Clapton
25 October 1992	Unplugged	Eric Clapton
1 November 1992	Automatic for the People	R.E.M.
8 November 1992	Glittering Prize 81/92	Simple Minds
15 November 1992	Unplugged	Eric Clapton
22 November 1992	Glittering Prize 81/92	Simple Minds
29 November 1992	Glittering Prize 81/92	Simple Minds
6 December 1992	Glittering Prize 81/92	Simple Minds
13 December 1992	Unplugged	Eric Clapton
20 December 1992	Unplugged	Eric Clapton
27 December 1992	Summer break – no chart	Summer break – no chart

== 1993 ==
Key
‡ – Album of New Zealand origin

Week	Title	Artist
3 January 1993	Summer break – no chart	Summer break – no chart
10 January 1993	Summer break – no chart	Summer break – no chart
17 January 1993	Unplugged	Eric Clapton
24 January 1993	The Bodyguard: Original Soundtrack Album	Whitney Houston
31 January 1993	The Bodyguard: Original Soundtrack Album	Whitney Houston
7 February 1993	The Bodyguard: Original Soundtrack Album	Whitney Houston
14 February 1993	The Bodyguard: Original Soundtrack Album	Whitney Houston
21 February 1993	The Bodyguard: Original Soundtrack Album	Whitney Houston
28 February 1993	The Bodyguard: Original Soundtrack Album	Whitney Houston
7 March 1993	The Bodyguard: Original Soundtrack Album	Whitney Houston
14 March 1993	Unplugged	Eric Clapton
21 March 1993	The Bodyguard: Original Soundtrack Album	Whitney Houston
28 March 1993	Unplugged	Eric Clapton
4 April 1993	Unplugged	Eric Clapton
11 April 1993	Unplugged	Eric Clapton
18 April 1993	The Dark Side of the Moon	Pink Floyd
25 April 1993	Pure Cult: for Rockers, Ravers, Lovers, and Sinners	The Cult
2 May 1993	Pure Cult: for Rockers, Ravers, Lovers, and Sinners	The Cult
9 May 1993	Pure Cult: for Rockers, Ravers, Lovers, and Sinners	The Cult
16 May 1993	Breathless	Kenny G
23 May 1993	Breathless	Kenny G
30 May 1993	Dangerous	Michael Jackson
6 June 1993	Dangerous	Michael Jackson
13 June 1993	Breathless	Kenny G
20 June 1993	Pocket Full of Kryptonite	Spin Doctors
27 June 1993	Pocket Full of Kryptonite	Spin Doctors
4 July 1993	janet.	Janet Jackson
11 July 1993	The Ultimate Experience	Jimi Hendrix
18 July 1993	Zooropa	U2
25 July 1993	Promises and Lies	UB40
1 August 1993	Promises and Lies	UB40
8 August 1993	Promises and Lies	UB40
15 August 1993	Promises and Lies	UB40
22 August 1993	Promises and Lies	UB40
29 August 1993	Promises and Lies	UB40
5 September 1993	Promises and Lies	UB40
12 September 1993	The Classic Collection	Little River Band
19 September 1993	The Classic Collection	Little River Band
26 September 1993	River of Dreams	Billy Joel
3 October 1993	Bat Out of Hell II: Back into Hell	Meat Loaf
10 October 1993	Bat Out of Hell II: Back into Hell	Meat Loaf
17 October 1993	Bat Out of Hell II: Back into Hell	Meat Loaf
24 October 1993	Bat Out of Hell II: Back into Hell	Meat Loaf
7 November 1993	Vs.	Pearl Jam
14 November 1993	Vs.	Pearl Jam
21 November 1993	Together Alone^{‡}	Crowded House
28 November 1993	So Far So Good	Bryan Adams
5 December 1993	So Far So Good	Bryan Adams
12 December 1993	So Far So Good	Bryan Adams
19 December 1993	Danny Boy	John McDermott
26 December 1993	So Far So Good	Bryan Adams

== 1994 ==
Key
‡ – Album of New Zealand origin

Week	Title	Artist
2 January 1994	Summer break – no chart	Summer break – no chart
9 January 1994	Summer break – no chart	Summer break – no chart
16 January 1994	So Far So Good	Bryan Adams
23 January 1994	So Far So Good	Bryan Adams
30 January 1994	So Far So Good	Bryan Adams
6 February 1994	So Far So Good	Bryan Adams
13 February 1994	So Far So Good	Bryan Adams
20 February 1994	So Far So Good	Bryan Adams
27 February 1994	So Far So Good	Bryan Adams
6 March 1994	Greatest Hits	The Police
13 March 1994	Jar of Flies	Alice in Chains
20 March 1994	Superunknown	Soundgarden
27 March 1994	Ingénue	k.d. lang
3 April 1994	Elegant Slumming	M People
10 April 1994	The Cross of Changes	Enigma
17 April 1994	The Cross of Changes	Enigma
24 April 1994	The Division Bell	Pink Floyd
1 May 1994	The Division Bell	Pink Floyd
8 May 1994	The Division Bell	Pink Floyd
15 May 1994	Happy Nation	Ace of Base
22 May 1994	Happy Nation	Ace of Base
29 May 1994	Happy Nation	Ace of Base
5 June 1994	Happy Nation	Ace of Base
12 June 1994	Happy Nation	Ace of Base
19 June 1994	God Shuffled His Feet	Crash Test Dummies
26 June 1994	God Shuffled His Feet	Crash Test Dummies
3 July 1994	God Shuffled His Feet	Crash Test Dummies
10 July 1994	God Shuffled His Feet	Crash Test Dummies
17 July 1994	Traction^{‡}	Supergroove
24 July 1994	Traction^{‡}	Supergroove
31 July 1994	Traction^{‡}	Supergroove
7 August 1994	Traction^{‡}	Supergroove
14 August 1994	Voodoo Lounge	The Rolling Stones
21 August 1994	End of Part One: Their Greatest Hits	Wet Wet Wet
28 August 1994	End of Part One: Their Greatest Hits	Wet Wet Wet
4 September 1994	The Lion King	Soundtrack
11 September 1994	The 3 Tenors in Concert 1994	José Carreras, Plácido Domingo and Luciano Pavarotti with Zubin Mehta
18 September 1994	The Lion King	Soundtrack
25 September 1994	The Lion King	Soundtrack
2 October 1994	The Lion King	Soundtrack
9 October 1994	The Lion King	Soundtrack
16 October 1994	II	Boyz II Men
23 October 1994	Monster	R.E.M.
30 October 1994	Monster	R.E.M.
6 November 1994	Monster	R.E.M.
13 November 1994	Cross Road	Bon Jovi
20 November 1994	MTV Unplugged in New York	Nirvana
27 November 1994	Forrest Gump	Soundtrack
4 December 1994	Forrest Gump	Soundtrack
11 December 1994	Forrest Gump	Soundtrack
18 December 1994	Vitalogy	Pearl Jam
25 December 1994	Forrest Gump	Soundtrack

== 1995 ==
Key
‡ – Album of New Zealand origin

Week	Title	Artist
1 January 1995	Summer break – no chart	Summer break – no chart
8 January 1995	Summer break – no chart	Summer break – no chart
15 January 1995	Forrest Gump	Soundtrack
22 January 1995	Forrest Gump	Soundtrack
29 January 1995	Forrest Gump	Soundtrack
5 February 1995	Forrest Gump	Soundtrack
12 February 1995	The Adventures of Priscilla, Queen of the Desert	Soundtrack
19 February 1995	The Adventures of Priscilla, Queen of the Desert	Soundtrack
26 February 1995	The Adventures of Priscilla, Queen of the Desert	Soundtrack
5 March 1995	The Adventures of Priscilla, Queen of the Desert	Soundtrack
12 March 1995	The Adventures of Priscilla, Queen of the Desert	Soundtrack
19 March 1995	No Need to Argue	The Cranberries
26 March 1995	Greatest Hits	Bruce Springsteen
2 April 1995	Greatest Hits	Bruce Springsteen
9 April 1995	Greatest Hits	Bruce Springsteen
16 April 1995	Greatest Hits	Bruce Springsteen
23 April 1995	Dookie	Green Day
30 April 1995	Dookie	Green Day
7 May 1995	Dookie	Green Day
14 May 1995	Dookie	Green Day
21 May 1995	Painted Desert Serenade	Joshua Kadison
28 May 1995	No Need to Argue	The Cranberries
4 June 1995	No Need to Argue	The Cranberries
11 June 1995	No Need to Argue	The Cranberries
18 June 1995	Boheme	Deep Forest
25 June 1995	Pulse	Pink Floyd
2 July 1995	HIStory: Past, Present and Future, Book I	Michael Jackson
9 July 1995	HIStory: Past, Present and Future, Book I	Michael Jackson
16 July 1995	HIStory: Past, Present and Future, Book I	Michael Jackson
23 July 1995	HIStory: Past, Present and Future, Book I	Michael Jackson
30 July 1995	HIStory: Past, Present and Future, Book I	Michael Jackson
6 August 1995	Throwing Copper	Live
13 August 1995	Throwing Copper	Live
20 August 1995	Another Night	Real McCoy
27 August 1995	Throwing Copper	Live
3 September 1995	CrazySexyCool	TLC
10 September 1995	CrazySexyCool	TLC
17 September 1995	Cracked Rear View	Hootie & the Blowfish
24 September 1995	One Hot Minute	Red Hot Chili Peppers
1 October 1995	Cracked Rear View	Hootie & the Blowfish
8 October 1995	Cracked Rear View	Hootie & the Blowfish
15 October 1995	Cracked Rear View	Hootie & the Blowfish
22 October 1995	Daydream	Mariah Carey
29 October 1995	Design of a Decade: 1986–1996	Janet Jackson
5 November 1995	Mellon Collie and the Infinite Sadness	The Smashing Pumpkins
12 November 1995	Design of a Decade: 1986–1996	Janet Jackson
19 November 1995	Made in Heaven	Queen
26 November 1995	Made in Heaven	Queen
3 December 1995	All You Can Eat	k.d. lang
10 December 1995	Anthology 1	The Beatles
17 December 1995	Made in Heaven	Queen
24 December 1995	Love Songs	Elton John
31 December 1995	Summer break – no chart	Summer break – no chart

== 1996 ==
Key
‡ – Album of New Zealand origin

Week	Title	Artist
7 January 1996	Summer break – no chart	Summer break – no chart
14 January 1996	Once Bitten, Twice Bitten: The Singles 1981–1995^{‡}	The Exponents
21 January 1996	(What's the Story) Morning Glory?	Oasis
28 January 1996	(What's the Story) Morning Glory?	Oasis
4 February 1996	(What's the Story) Morning Glory?	Oasis
11 February 1996	(What's the Story) Morning Glory?	Oasis
18 February 1996	(What's the Story) Morning Glory?	Oasis
25 February 1996	(What's the Story) Morning Glory?	Oasis
3 March 1996	(What's the Story) Morning Glory?	Oasis
10 March 1996	(What's the Story) Morning Glory?	Oasis
17 March 1996	Jagged Little Pill	Alanis Morissette
24 March 1996	Jagged Little Pill	Alanis Morissette
31 March 1996	Jagged Little Pill	Alanis Morissette
7 April 1996	Jagged Little Pill	Alanis Morissette
14 April 1996	Jagged Little Pill	Alanis Morissette
21 April 1996	Jagged Little Pill	Alanis Morissette
28 April 1996	Jagged Little Pill	Alanis Morissette
5 May 1996	Jagged Little Pill	Alanis Morissette
12 May 1996	To the Faithful Departed	The Cranberries
19 May 1996	Jagged Little Pill	Alanis Morissette
26 May 1996	Older	George Michael
2 June 1996	Down on the Upside	Soundgarden
9 June 1996	Jagged Little Pill	Alanis Morissette
16 June 1996	Load	Metallica
23 June 1996	Load	Metallica
30 June 1996	Collective Soul	Collective Soul
7 July 1996	Jagged Little Pill	Alanis Morissette
14 July 1996	Recurring Dream: The Very Best of Crowded House^{‡}	Crowded House
21 July 1996	Recurring Dream: The Very Best of Crowded House^{‡}	Crowded House
28 July 1996	Recurring Dream: The Very Best of Crowded House^{‡}	Crowded House
4 August 1996	Recurring Dream: The Very Best of Crowded House^{‡}	Crowded House
11 August 1996	Recurring Dream: The Very Best of Crowded House^{‡}	Crowded House
18 August 1996	Recurring Dream: The Very Best of Crowded House^{‡}	Crowded House
25 August 1996	Recurring Dream: The Very Best of Crowded House^{‡}	Crowded House
1 September 1996	Recurring Dream: The Very Best of Crowded House^{‡}	Crowded House
8 September 1996	No Code	Pearl Jam
15 September 1996	No Code	Pearl Jam
22 September 1996	New Adventures in Hi-Fi	R.E.M.
29 September 1996	New Adventures in Hi-Fi	R.E.M.
6 October 1996	New Adventures in Hi-Fi	R.E.M.
13 October 1996	New Adventures in Hi-Fi	R.E.M.
20 October 1996	Garbage	Garbage
27 October 1996	Ænima	Tool
3 November 1996	Greatest Hits	Simply Red
10 November 1996	Greatest Hits	Simply Red
17 November 1996	Life Is Peachy	Korn
24 November 1996	HIStory: Past, Present and Future, Book I	Michael Jackson
1 December 1996	HIStory: Past, Present and Future, Book I	Michael Jackson
8 December 1996	Falling into You	Celine Dion
15 December 1996	Falling into You	Celine Dion
22 December 1996	Falling into You	Celine Dion
29 December 1996	Summer break – no chart	Summer break – no chart

== 1997 ==
Key
‡ – Album of New Zealand origin

Week	Title	Artist
4 January 1997	Summer break – no chart	Summer break – no chart
12 January 1997	Summer break – no chart	Summer break – no chart
19 January 1997	Spice	Spice Girls
26 January 1997	Tragic Kingdom	No Doubt
2 February 1997	Tragic Kingdom	No Doubt
9 February 1997	Tragic Kingdom	No Doubt
16 February 1997	Forgiven, Not Forgotten – Australian Tour 1997	The Corrs
23 February 1997	Romeo + Juliet	Soundtrack
2 March 1997	Romeo + Juliet	Soundtrack
9 March 1997	Romeo + Juliet	Soundtrack
16 March 1997	Pop	U2
23 March 1997	Romeo + Juliet	Soundtrack
30 March 1997	Romeo + Juliet	Soundtrack
6 April 1997	Romeo + Juliet	Soundtrack
13 April 1997	Romeo + Juliet	Soundtrack
20 April 1997	Wildest Dreams – Special Tour Edition	Tina Turner
27 April 1997	Wildest Dreams – Special Tour Edition	Tina Turner
4 May 1997	Romeo + Juliet	Soundtrack
11 May 1997	Secret Samadhi	Live
18 May 1997	Romeo + Juliet	Soundtrack
25 May 1997	Bringing Down the Horse	The Wallflowers
1 June 1997	Blood on the Dance Floor: HIStory in the Mix	Michael Jackson
8 June 1997	The Will to Live	Ben Harper
15 June 1997	Wu-Tang Forever	Wu-Tang Clan
22 June 1997	Wu-Tang Forever	Wu-Tang Clan
29 June 1997	OK Computer	Radiohead
6 July 1997	Album of the Year	Faith No More
13 July 1997	The Fat of the Land	The Prodigy
20 July 1997	The Fat of the Land	The Prodigy
27 July 1997	The Fat of the Land	The Prodigy
3 August 1997	Still Waters	Bee Gees
10 August 1997	Drive^{‡}	Bic Runga
17 August 1997	Drive^{‡}	Bic Runga
24 August 1997	Drive^{‡}	Bic Runga
31 August 1997	Pieces of You	Jewel
7 September 1997	Be Here Now	Oasis
14 September 1997	Be Here Now	Oasis
21 September 1997	Spawn	Soundtrack
28 September 1997	Spawn	Soundtrack
5 October 1997	Aquarium	Aqua
12 October 1997	Urban Hymns	The Verve
19 October 1997	Portishead	Portishead
26 October 1997	Portishead	Portishead
2 November 1997	Portishead	Portishead
9 November 1997	Savage Garden	Savage Garden
16 November 1997	Savage Garden	Savage Garden
23 November 1997	Spiceworld	Spice Girls
30 November 1997	Reload	Metallica
7 December 1997	Let's Talk About Love	Celine Dion
14 December 1997	Let's Talk About Love	Celine Dion
21 December 1997	Let's Talk About Love	Celine Dion
28 December 1997	Summer break – no chart	Summer break – no chart

== 1998 ==
Key
‡ – Album of New Zealand origin

Week	Title	Artist
4 January	Summer break – no chart	Summer break – no chart
11 January	Summer break – no chart	Summer break – no chart
18 January 1998	Let's Talk About Love	Celine Dion
25 January 1998	Let's Talk About Love	Celine Dion
1 February 1998	Let's Talk About Love	Celine Dion
8 February 1998	Titanic: Music from the Motion Picture	Soundtrack / James Horner
15 February 1998	Yield	Pearl Jam
22 February 1998	Yield	Pearl Jam
1 March 1998	Titanic: Music from the Motion Picture	Soundtrack / James Horner
8 March 1998	Titanic: Music from the Motion Picture	Soundtrack / James Horner
15 March 1998	Ray of Light	Madonna
22 March 1998	Titanic: Music from the Motion Picture	Soundtrack / James Horner
29 March 1998	Aquarium	Aqua
4 April 1998	Aquarium	Aqua
12 April 1998	Titanic: Music from the Motion Picture	Soundtrack / James Horner
19 April 1998	Titanic: Music from the Motion Picture	Soundtrack / James Horner
26 April 1998	Days of the New	Days of the New
3 May 1998	Let's Talk About Love	Celine Dion
10 May 1998	Mezzanine	Massive Attack
17 May 1998	Let's Talk About Love	Celine Dion
24 May 1998	Version 2.0	Garbage
31 May 1998	Version 2.0	Garbage
7 June 1998	Version 2.0	Garbage
14 June 1998	Adore	The Smashing Pumpkins
21 June 1998	Adore	The Smashing Pumpkins
28 June 1998	Try Whistling This^{‡}	Neil Finn
5 July 1998	Try Whistling This^{‡}	Neil Finn
12 July 1998	Try Whistling This^{‡}	Neil Finn
19 July 1998	Hello Nasty	Beastie Boys
26 July 1998	Hello Nasty	Beastie Boys
2 August 1998	Hello Nasty	Beastie Boys
9 August 1998	City of Angels	Soundtrack
16 August 1998	City of Angels	Soundtrack
23 August 1998	The Islander^{‡}	Dave Dobbyn
30 August 1998	Follow the Leader	Korn
6 September 1998	Supersystem^{‡}	The Feelers
13 September 1998	Espresso Guitar^{‡}	Martin Winch
20 September 1998	Espresso Guitar^{‡}	Martin Winch
27 September 1998	Espresso Guitar^{‡}	Martin Winch
4 October 1998	Songs from Ally McBeal	Vonda Shepard
11 October 1998	Songs from Ally McBeal	Vonda Shepard
18 October 1998	5ive	Five
25 October 1998	Where We Belong	Boyzone
1 November 1998	B*Witched	B*Witched
8 November 1998	One Night Only	Bee Gees
15 November 1998	The Best of 1980–1990	U2
22 November 1998	Supposed Former Infatuation Junkie	Alanis Morissette
29 November 1998	The Best of 1980–1990	U2
6 December 1998	One Night Only	Bee Gees
13 November 1998	One Night Only	Bee Gees
20 December 1998	One Night Only	Bee Gees
27 December 1998	The Very Best of Dean Martin: The Capitol & Reprise Years	Dean Martin

== 1999 ==
Key
‡ – Album of New Zealand origin

Week	Title	Artist
3 January 1999	Summer break – no chart	Summer break – no chart
10 January 1999	One Night Only	Bee Gees
17 January 1999	One Night Only	Bee Gees
24 January 1999	Believe	Cher
31 January 1999	Believe	Cher
7 February 1999	Believe	Cher
14 February 1999	Believe	Cher
21 February 1999	My Own Prison	Creed
28 February 1999	My Own Prison	Creed
7 March 1999	My Own Prison	Creed
14 March 1999	Americana	The Offspring
21 March 1999	One Night Only	Bee Gees
28 March 1999	One Night Only	Bee Gees
4 April 1999	One Night Only	Bee Gees
11 April 1999	One Night Only	Bee Gees
18 April 1999	You've Come a Long Way, Baby	Fatboy Slim
25 April 1999	One Night Only	Bee Gees
2 May 1999	Come On Over	Shania Twain
9 May 1999	Come On Over	Shania Twain
16 May 1999	Come On Over	Shania Twain
23 May 1999	Come On Over	Shania Twain
30 May 1999	Come On Over	Shania Twain
6 June 1999	Talk on Corners	The Corrs
13 June 1999	Millennium	Backstreet Boys
20 June 1999	Ricky Martin	Ricky Martin
27 June 1999	Dream^{‡}	TrueBliss
4 July 1999	By Request	Boyzone
11 July 1999	By Request	Boyzone
18 July 1999	By Request	Boyzone
25 July 1999	The Ego Has Landed	Robbie Williams
1 August 1999	Come On Over	Shania Twain
8 August 1999	Come On Over	Shania Twain
15 August 1999	Come On Over	Shania Twain
22 August 1999	Come On Over	Shania Twain
29 August 1999	Come On Over	Shania Twain
5 September 1999	Come On Over	Shania Twain
12 September 1999	Come On Over	Shania Twain
19 September 1999	Ricky Martin	Ricky Martin
26 September 1999	Mix^{‡}	Stellar
3 October 1999	Come On Over	Shania Twain
10 October 1999	The General Electric^{‡}	Shihad
17 October 1999	Come On Over	Shania Twain
24 October 1999	Come On Over	Shania Twain
31 October 1999	Come On Over	Shania Twain
7 November 1999	Come On Over	Shania Twain
14 November 1999	The Battle of Los Angeles	Rage Against the Machine
21 November 1999	Come On Over	Shania Twain
28 November 1999	Come On Over	Shania Twain
5 December 1999	Come On Over	Shania Twain
12 December 1999	Come On Over	Shania Twain
19 December 1999	Come On Over	Shania Twain
26 December 1999	Come On Over	Shania Twain

== Notes ==
^‡ This album is of New Zealand origin
