= Why Does Love Do This to Me =

1991 single by the Exponents

Single by the Exponents

from the album Something Beginning with C
- B-side: "Sadness"
- Released: April 1991
- Recorded: Christmas 1990
- Studio: Airforce (Auckland, New Zealand)
- Length: 3:25
- Label: PolyGram New Zealand, Mercury
- Songwriter: Jordan Luck
- Producer: The Exponents with Paul Streekstra

The Exponents singles chronology
"Brand New Doll" (1987)	"Why Does Love Do This to Me" (1991)	"Who Loves Who the Most" (1991)

"Why Does Love Do This to Me" (alternatively spelt "Why Does Love (Do This to Me)") is a song by New Zealand pop band the Exponents. It was released in 1991 and is the Exponents' highest-charting single on the New Zealand Singles Chart (along with "Who Loves Who the Most"), reaching number three.

== History ==
Having moved to London in 1987, the single was the band's first release upon returning to New Zealand and changing their name from the Dance Exponents to the Exponents. The song was written by Jordan Luck in London in 1989, with the group returning to New Zealand in November 1990 and signing to PolyGram Records New Zealand.

The song proved popular, peaking at number three on the New Zealand Singles Chart, charting for 29 weeks. Its singalong chorus made the single a hit and helped make the Exponents a popular live band in the 1990s. The single was also released in Australia in 1993 but did not chart.

The song's music video was directed by Kerry Brown. It features the band playing the song in several iconic New Zealand landscapes, including a steamy thermal area, a bush road and by a cliffside.

In 2001, the song was ranked at number 47 on the APRA Top 100 New Zealand Songs of All Time list, as voted by APRA's members. The song was included on Nature's Best 2, a compilation album of songs number 31 to number 65 from the list. At the 1992 New Zealand Music Awards, the track was awarded Single of the Year.

"Why Does Love Do This to Me" is also known as a singalong anthem played during rugby games in New Zealand. Popularised during the 2005 British & Irish Lions tour to New Zealand, the song has become a stadium staple at New Zealand rugby events.

The track is on the Exponents' 1992 studio album Something Beginning with C and also gives its name to the band's 2011 greatest hits album Why Does Love Do This to Me: The Exponents Greatest Hits. The 2013 deluxe edition of Something Beginning with C includes the original UK demo version of the song.

== Track listings ==
New Zealand 7-inch and cassette single

1. "Why Does Love Do This to Me" (3:25)
2. "Sadness"

Australian CD single

1. "Why Does Love Do This to Me" (Craig Parteils remix)
2. "Nameless Girl"
3. "Sometimes"
4. "Why Does Love Do This to Me" (video mix)

== Personnel ==
- Jordan Luck – vocals
- Brian Jones – guitar
- David Gent – bass
- Michael "Harry" Harallambi – drums

== Charts ==
=== Weekly charts ===
Chart (1991)	Peak position
New Zealand (Recorded Music NZ)	3

=== Year-end charts ===
Chart (1991)	Position
New Zealand (RIANZ)	6

== Certifications ==
Region	Certification	Certified units/sales
New Zealand (RMNZ)	5× Platinum	150,000^{‡}
^{‡} Sales+streaming figures based on certification alone.
