= Hepfidelity and More =

Video by Diesel
- Released: 1993
- Genre: Rock music, Soft rock, Soul music
- Length: 76mins
- Label: EMI Music

Diesel chronology
Johnny Diesel and the Injectors (1989)	Hepfidelity and More (1993)	The First Fifteen '89–'04 Live (2004)

"Hepfidelity and More" is a video by Australian musician Diesel. It was released in 1993

It includes video clips and live tracks from Diesel's triple platinum album Hepfidelity and The Lobbyist.

== Track listing ==
1. "Love Junk - 0:08
2. "Come to Me" - 0:10
3. "Love Junk" - 3:46
4. "Come to Me" (UK Version) - 1:03
5. "Come To Me" - 1:42
6. "Too Much of a Good Thing" (Live) - 4:44
7. "Man Alive" - 4:01
8. "One More Time" - 3:59
9. "Come to Me" (Live) - 4:45
10. "Tip of My Tongue" - 3:56
11. "Get Lucky" - 5:05
12. "Never Miss Your Water" - 4:02
13. "Masterplan" - 5:17
14. "I've Been Loving You Too Long" - 3:54
- Also features exclusive interview footage
