= Once Bitten, Twice Bitten =

Once Bitten, Twice Bitten: The Singles 1981–1995

Greatest hits album by The Exponents
- Released: December 1995
- Recorded: 1981–1995
- Genre: Rock
- Length: 68:39
- Label: Warner Music New Zealand

The Exponents chronology
Grassy Knoll (1994)	Once Bitten, Twice Bitten: The Singles 1981–1995 (1995)	Better Never Than Late (1997)

Singles from Once Bitten, Twice Bitten: The Singles 1981–1995
- 1. "La La Lulu" / "The Summer You Never Meant" Released: October 1995

Once Bitten, Twice Bitten: The Singles 1981–1995 is a greatest hits collection by the New Zealand band The Exponents, released in December 1995. The album reached number one and spent 18 weeks on the New Zealand Album Charts, eventually going five times platinum. The album included two new recordings, "La La Lulu" and "Summer You Never Meant."

== Track listing ==
All tracks are written by Jordan Luck, except where noted.

No.	Title	Writer(s)	Original release	Length
1.	"Victoria"		Original single (1982)	3:26
2.	"Airway Spies"		Non-album single (1982)	2:48
3.	"Your Best Friend Loves Me Too"		Prayers Be Answered (1983)	2:40
4.	"All I Can Do"		Prayers Be Answered	2:40
5.	"Know Your Own Heart"		Prayers Be Answered	3:27
6.	"I'll Say Goodbye (Even Though I'm Blue)"		Prayers Be Answered	2:52
7.	"Sex and Agriculture"	Luck; Brian Jones	Original single (1984)	3:42
8.	"Christchurch (In Cashel St. I Wait)"	Luck; B. Jones; David Gent	Expectations (1985)	4:15
9.	"Greater Hopes Greater Expectations"		Expectations	4:04
10.	"Caroline Skies"		Amplifier (1986)	3:16
11.	"Only I Could Die (and Love You Still)"	Luck; Chris Sheehan	Amplifier	4:34
12.	"Brand New Doll"	Luck; Melvin Jones	Non-album single (1987)	3:36
13.	"Why Does Love Do This To Me"		Something Beginning with C (1992)	3:26
14.	"Who Loves Who The Most"		Something Beginning with C	4:13
15.	"Whatever Happened To Tracey"	Luck; Sheehan	Something Beginning with C	2:49
16.	"Sink Like A Stone"		Something Beginning with C	2:20
17.	"Erotic"		Something Beginning with C	4:56
18.	"Like She Said"		Grassy Knoll (1994)	3:08
19.	"La La Lulu"	Dave Barraclough	Previously unreleased	3:04
20.	"The Summer You Never Meant"	Luck; Barraclough	Previously unreleased	3:23
Total length:				68:39

== Charts ==
=== Weekly charts ===
Chart (1995–1996)	Peak position
New Zealand Albums (RMNZ)	1

=== Year-end charts ===
Chart (1996)	Position
New Zealand Albums (RMNZ)	37
