= Eight Days at Roundhead =

Studio album by The Exponents
- Released: 10 May 2013
- Recorded: 2005–2012
- Studio: Roundhead Studios (Auckland)
- Genre: Rock
- Length: 34:15
- Label: Universal Music New Zealand
- Producers: The Exponents; Neil Finn; Neil Baldock

The Exponents chronology
Why Does Love Do This to Me: The Exponents Greatest Hits (2011)	Eight Days at Roundhead (2013)

Eight Days at Roundhead is an album by the New Zealand band The Exponents, released in 2013. Recorded at Roundhead Studios during the making of a documentary about the group, the album was produced by Neil Baldock and The Exponents in 2012 except "Geraldine" and "Or A Girl I Knew" which were produced by Neil Finn at Roundhead in Auckland in 2005. Eight Days At Roundhead was released in May 2013 as either a stand-alone digital album or as a bonus album packaged with Why Does Love Do This to Me: The Exponents Greatest Hits.

== Track listing ==
All tracks are written by Jordan Luck except where noted.

No.	Title	Writer(s)	Length
1.	"Social Life"		2:28
2.	"Rural Town"		2:31
3.	"It's an Early Winter"		3:06
4.	"Walk Around the Roses"		4:29
5.	"You Got Ten Minutes Now"	Luck; Neil Baldock	3:21
6.	"Within Fields About Me"		4:07
7.	"I Can't Give You More"		3:27
8.	"Caroline Skies"		4:35
9.	"Geraldine"	Luck; Brian Jones	3:28
10.	"Or a Girl I Knew"		2:43
Total length:			34:15
