= Hello, Love You, Goodbye =

Studio album by The Exponents
- Released: December 1999
- Recorded: 1999
- Genre: Rock
- Length: 64:48
- Label: Sony
- Producer: Malcolm Welsford

The Exponents chronology
| Better Never Than Late (1997) | Hello, Love You, Goodbye (1999) | Sex and Agriculture: The Very Best of The Exponents (2005) |

Hello, Love You, Goodbye is the seventh studio album by the New Zealand band The Exponents, released in December 1999. The first half comprises six new studio recordings, while the second half comprises eight live recordings, recorded at the Pounamu Hotel in Takapuna, Auckland. The album was made available digitally in May 2013.

== Track listing ==
All tracks are written by Jordan Luck except where noted.

| No. | Title | Writer(s) | Length |
|---|---|---|---|
| 1. | "Cathode Ray" | Dave Barraclough | 5:03 |
| 2. | "Loneliness... Is What It Is" | Barraclough | 3:03 |
| 3. | "Red, White and Crimson" | | 4:59 |
| 4. | "Haunting" | Luck; Barraclough | 3:36 |
| 5. | "Big World Out Your Window" | Barraclough | 3:56 |
| 6. | "Hello, Love You, Goodbye" | Luck; Barraclough | 5:37 |
| 7. | "Erotic" (live) | | 5:42 |
| 8. | "Sink Like a Stone" (live) | | 3:04 |
| 9. | "Whatever Happened to Tracey" (live) | Luck; Chris Sheehan | 3:59 |
| 10. | "La La Lulu" (live) | Barraclough | 3:37 |
| 11. | "Victoria" (live) | | 4:18 |
| 12. | "Who Loves Who the Most" (live) | | 6:47 |
| 13. | "Why Does Love Do This to Me" (live) | | 4:44 |
| 14. | "I'll Say Goodbye (Even Though I'm Blue)" (live) | | 6:23 |
| Total length: | | | 64:48 |

== Charts ==
| Chart (2000) | Peak position |
|---|---|
| New Zealand Albums (RMNZ) | 48 |
