= Piece of You =

Piece of You may refer to:

- "Piece of You", a song by Diesel from the 1992 album Hepfidelity
- "Piece of You", a song by Shawn Mendes from the 2020 album Wonder
- "Piece of You", a song by Joji and Giveon from the 2026 album Piss in the Wind
