= Live at Mainstreet =

Live album by The Dance Exponents and The Legionnaires
- Released: June 1983
- Recorded: 13 May 1983
- Venue: Mainstreet Cabaret (Auckland)
- Genre: Pop rock
- Length: 37:27
- Label: Mushroom

The Dance Exponents and The Legionnaires chronology
Live at Mainstreet (1983)	Prayers Be Answered (1983)

Live At Mainstreet is a 1983 live album and the first release by New Zealand band The Dance Exponents. The band was recorded alongside another band called the Legionnaires at a May performance at the Mainstreet Cabaret for the Radio with Pictures TV show. The album charted at #3 and spent nine weeks on the New Zealand Album Chart. In May 2013, Universal Music re-released the Dance Exponents tracks and the Legionnaires' tracks as separate EP releases.

== Track listing ==
All tracks on side one are written by Graham Brazier, except for "I'm a Texan" by Brazier and Dave McArtney.

All tracks on side two are written by Jordan Luck.

Side one (The Legionnaires)
No.	Title	Length
1.	"I'm a Texan"	3:52
2.	"No Mystery"	4:38
3.	"Billy Bold"	3:36
4.	"Blue Lady"	6:45
Total length:		18:51

Side two (The Dance Exponents)
No.	Title	Length
5.	"Airway Spies"	2:58
6.	"Perfect Romance"	2:47
7.	"My Date with You Was a Date with No One"	3:44
8.	"All I Can Do"	2:56
9.	"Gone Forever in Another Car"	3:05
10.	"Poland"	3:06
Total length:		18:36 37:27

== Personnel ==
Personnel as listed in the album's liner notes are:

=== The Legionnaires ===
- Graham Brazier – vocals, harp
- Harry Lyon – vocals, guitar
- Dave McArtney – vocals, guitar
- Paul Woolright – bass guitar
- Stuart Pearce – keyboards
- Lyn Buchanan – drums

=== The Dance Exponents ===
- Jordan Luck – vocals
- Brian Jones – guitar
- David Gent – bass guitar
- Michael "Harry" Harallambi – drums

=== Production ===
- Doug Rogers – engineering, mixing (tracks 1-4)
- Reid Snell – mixing (tracks 1-4)
- Ben Free, Steve Kennedy – mixing (tracks 5-10)
- Paul Streekstra – engineering
- Brent Scott – photography
- Wayne Robinson – cover artwork

== Charts ==
=== Weekly charts ===
Chart (1983)	Peak position
New Zealand Albums (RMNZ)	3

=== Year-end charts ===
Chart (1983)	Position
New Zealand Albums (RMNZ)	49
