= Live in London (Johnny Diesel and the Injectors EP) =

Live album by Johnny Diesel and the Injectors
- Released: 10 July 1989
- Recorded: 14 May 1989
- Venue: BBC Radio 1
- Genre: Hard rock
- Length: 47:53
- Label: Chrysalis; EMI
- Producer: Tony Wilson

Johnny Diesel and the Injectors chronology
Johnny Diesel and the Injectors (1989)	Live in London (1989)	Hepfidelity (1992)

Live in London is the first extended play by Australian hard rockers, Johnny Diesel and the Injectors. The four tracks were recorded live in May 1989 and released in July of that year via Chrysalis Records and EMI Music. The group were touring the United Kingdom in mid-1989 and broadcast a live performance, via BBC Radio 1, for the Tommy Vance Sessions, which was produced by Tony Wilson. The EP reached No. 27 on the ARIA Albums Chart. Three of the tracks appear on their previous studio album, Johnny Diesel and the Injectors, (March 1989). While "Rat Pack" was a new track.

== Track listing ==
CD and vinyl Chrysalis Records/EMI Music (CDCHM 321728)

- All tracks written by Mark Denis Lizotte p.k.a. Johnny Diesel or Diesel.
1. "Burn"
2. "Rat Pack"
3. "Parisienne Hotel"
4. "Lookin' for Love"

=== Weekly Performance ===
Chart (1989)	Peak position
Australian Albums Chart	27

== Personnel ==
Johnny Diesel and the Injectors

- Johnny Diesel: – vocals, guitar
- Bernie Bremond: – saxophones, backing vocals
- Johnny "Tatt" Dalzell: – bass guitar
- Yak Sherrit: – drums

Recording details

- Producer: – Tony Wilson at BBC Radio 1 for Tommy Vance Sessions hosted by Tommy Vance
- Audio engineer: – Mike Walter

Art works

- Cover photo: – Chrystene Carrol (for Available Light), Matthew Deller
- Cover art: – ADM Production
