= Love Junk (song) =

1991 single by Johnny Diesel

Single by Johnny Diesel

from the album Hepfidelity
- B-side: "Love Junk Violent"
- Released: 2 June 1991
- Studio: Studio Six (Memphis, Tennessee)
- Length: 3:44
- Label: Chrysalis
- Songwriter(s): Diesel
- Producer(s): Terry Manning

Johnny Diesel singles chronology
"Please Send Me Someone to Love" (1990)	"Love Junk" (1991)	"Come to Me" (1991)

"Love Junk" is a song by Australian rock musician Johnny Diesel. It is his first solo release since leaving Johnny Diesel and the Injectors in early 1991 and is the only song in his career to be credited to Johnny Diesel, as subsequent releases were either as Diesel or Mark Lizotte. The song was released on 2 June 1991 and peaked at 19 in Australia. It is included on his debut solo album, Hepfidelity (1992).

== Track listing ==
Australian CD single

1. "Love Junk" – 3:44
2. "Love Junk" (violent) – 4:00

== Chart performance ==
"Love Junk" debuted at No. 41 on the Australian Singles Chart in June 1991 before peaking at No. 19 in July.

=== Weekly charts ===
Chart (1991)	Peak position
Australia (ARIA)	19
