= Please Send Me Someone to Love =

1950 single by Percy Mayfield

Single by Percy Mayfield

from the album The Best of Percy Mayfield
- B-side: "Strange Things Happening"
- Released: Sept. 1950
- Recorded: August 16, 1950; Universal, Hollywood, California
- Genre: R&B, blues ballad
- Length: 2:53
- Label: Specialty Records
- Songwriter: Percy Mayfield
- Producer: Art Rupe

Percy Mayfield singles chronology
"Please Send Me Someone to Love" (1950)	"Lost Love (Baby, Please Come Back to Me)" (1951)

"Please Send Me Someone to Love" is a blues ballad, written and recorded by American blues and soul singer Percy Mayfield in 1950, for Art Rupe's Specialty Records. It was on the Billboard's R&B chart for 27 weeks and reached the number-one position for two weeks; it was Mayfield's most successful song.

== Song background ==
It has been called a "multilayered universal lament". Mayfield sang it in a soft ballad style. Its appeal lay in the sensitivity of its lyrics in juxtaposing an awareness of a world in conflict with a personal expression of the need for love. Sung in Mayfield's gentle, suave vocal style, the lyrics were a combination of a romantic love ballad and a social message against discrimination.

== Track listing ==
US 7"Vinyl

1. "Please Send Me Someone to Love" (2:50)
2. "Strange Things Happening" (2:49)

== Charts ==
Chart (1950)	Peak position
US Billboard Hot 100	26
US Hot R&B Sides (Billboard)	1

== Johnny Diesel and the Injectors version ==
"Please Send Me Someone to Love"

Single by Johnny Diesel and the Injectors

from the album The Delinquents (soundtrack)
- B-side: "Who's for Better" (Live)
- Released: January 1990
- Length: 4:17
- Label: Chrysalis
- Songwriter: Percy Mayfield
- Producer: Terry Manning

Johnny Diesel and the Injectors singles chronology
"Since I Fell for You" (1989)	"Please Send Me Someone to Love" (1990)	"Love Junk" (1991)

In 1989, the Australian ARIA award-winning rock band Johnny Diesel and the Injectors recorded the song for the soundtrack of the film The Delinquents. It was released as a single and peaked at number 11 on the Australian ARIA chart and was the 87th biggest-selling single in 1990.

=== Track listing ===
1. "Please Send Me Someone to Love" (4:17)
2. "Who's for Better" (3:40)
3. "Thang 1" (3:15)
- Tracks 2 and 3 recorded live at the Hordern Pavilion, Sydney, Australia, August 16, 1989

== Other versions ==
- Dinah Washington released a cover of the song in 1951.
- The Moonglows had a hit with their cover version in 1957.
- In 1967, Fred Neil covered the song for his album Sessions.
- In 1968, Toni Williams covered the song. It was the B-side of his single "Sad, Lonely and Blue", released by Zodiac Records.
- In 1969, Ruth Brown covered the song for her album Black Is Brown and Brown Is Beautiful.
- Freddie King recorded his version during his years with Shelter Records.
- In 1973, Mickey Newbury covered the song on his album Live at Montezuma Hall.
- Paul Butterfield's Better Days covered the song on their 1973 album Paul Butterfield's Better Days
- In 1977, The Animals covered the song on their reunion album, Before We Were So Rudely Interrupted.
- James Booker covered the song on his album King Of New Orleans Keyboard.
- In 2003, Leigh Harris and Larry Sieberth covered it on the album Patchwork: A Tribute to James Booker.
- In 1997, B.B. King and Mick Hucknall covered the song on the album Deuces Wild.
- In 1993, Sade released a cover of the song for the soundtrack of the movie Philadelphia.
- In 1994, Grover Washington Jr. recorded the song for his album All My Tomorrows.
- In 1998, Fiona Apple released a cover of the song for the soundtrack of the movie Pleasantville.
- In 2011, John Oates released a cover of the song for his solo album Mississippi Mile.
