= Better Never Than Late =

Studio album by The Exponents
- Released: May 1997
- Recorded: 1996-97
- Genre: Rock
- Length: 48:41
- Label: Sony
- Producers: Eddie Rayner; The Exponents

The Exponents chronology
Once Bitten, Twice Bitten: The Singles 1981-1995 (1995)	Better Never Than Late (1997)	Hello, Love You, Goodbye (1999)

Singles from Better Never Than Late
- 1. "One in a Lifetime" Released: April 1997; 2. "Close" Released: 1997; 3. "Change Your Mind" Released: 1997

Better Never Than Late is the sixth studio album by the New Zealand band The Exponents, released in May 1997. The album reached #3 on the New Zealand music charts and initial copies were released with a bonus live CD. The album was made available digitally in May 2013.

== Track listing ==
All tracks are written by Jordan Luck except where noted.

No.	Title	Writer(s)	Length
1.	"One in a Lifetime"	Luck; Dave Barraclough	3:39
2.	"Change Your Mind"		3:31
3.	"Shouldn't Be Allowed"	Barraclough	4:36
4.	"Close"		4:50
5.	"Come and Go"		2:49
6.	"Only You Are"		5:03
7.	"You Started Me Thinking"		4:47
8.	"Happy Today"	Luck; Barraclough	3:32
9.	"Help Me"	Luck; Matteo Rawlinson	4:06
10.	"Smith's Getting Through"		2:54
11.	"Infinity"	Luck; Barraclough	5:14
12.	"Everything at All"		3:40
Total length:			48:41

Bonus live CD
No.	Title	Writer(s)	Length
1.	"Erotic"		6:15
2.	"Do You Feel In Love"		2:48
3.	"Nameless Girl"		4:23
4.	"Sink Like a Stone"		3:05
5.	"Rocks"	Andrew Innes; Bobby Gillespie; Robert Young	4:29
6.	"You Started Me Thinking"		4:56
7.	"Sometimes"		7:13
8.	"Victoria"		5:00
Total length:			38:09

== Personnel ==
Personnel as listed in the album's liner notes are:

=== The Exponents ===
- Jordan Luck — vocals
- Dave Barraclough — guitar
- David Gent — bass guitar
- Michael "Harry" Harallambi — drums

=== Production ===
- Eddie Rayner — production
- Simon Sheridan, Matt Tait, Stuart Wordsworth, Chris Bolster — engineering
- Kieran Scott — cover photography

== Charts ==
Chart (1997)	Peak position
New Zealand Albums (RMNZ)	3
