= Don't Need Love (Johnny Diesel and the Injectors song) =

Single by Johnny Diesel and the Injectors

from the album Johnny Diesel and the Injectors
- B-side: "Never Last"
- Released: 23 October 1988
- Recorded: August 1988 – September 1988
- Studio: Ardent Studio and Alpha Sound (Memphis, Tennessee)
- Genre: Pop; rock
- Length: 4:15
- Label: Chrysalis
- Songwriter: Diesel
- Producer: Terry Manning

Johnny Diesel and the Injectors singles chronology
"Don't Need Love" (1988)	"Soul Revival" (1989)

Alternative cover
- Limited edition

"Don't Need Love" is the debut single by Australian rock group Johnny Diesel and the Injectors. The song was released in October 1988 and peaked at 10 in Australia and 7 in New Zealand.

The song was nominated for two awards at the ARIA Music Awards of 1989, winning Best New Talent but losing Breakthrough Artist – Single to "That's When I Think of You" by 1927.

== Track listing ==
7" single

1. "Don't Need Love" – 4:15
2. "Never Last" – 3:33

12" vinyl

1. "Don't Need Love" – 4:15
2. "Never Last" – 3:33
3. "Parisienne Hotel"

== Personnel ==
- Terry Manning – producer, engineer, mixing
- Johnny "Tatt" Dalzell – bass guitar
- Yak Sherrit – drums
- Johnny Diesel – guitar, vocals
- Bernie Bremond – saxophone, backing vocals

== Charts ==
"Don't Need Love" debuted at number 36 in Australia in November 1988, before peaking at #10 in December.

=== Weekly charts ===
Chart (1988–1989)	Peak position
Australia (ARIA)	10
New Zealand (Recorded Music NZ)	7
UK Singles (OCC)	83

=== Year-end charts ===
Chart (1989)	Position
Australia (ARIA)	54
