= Soul Revival =

Single by Johnny Diesel and the Injectors

from the album Johnny Diesel and the Injectors
- B-side: "Who's For Better"
- Released: 6 February 1989
- Recorded: August 1988 – September 1988
- Studio: Ardent Studio and Alpha Sound, Memphis, Tennessee
- Genre: Rock; garage rock
- Length: 4:05
- Label: Chrysalis Records
- Songwriter(s): Diesel
- Producer(s): Terry Manning

Johnny Diesel and the Injectors singles chronology
"Don't Need Love" (1988)	"Soul Revival" (1989)	"Cry In Shame" (1989)

"Soul Revival" is a song by Australian rock group, Johnny Diesel and the Injectors. The song was released as the band's second single from their debut album Johnny Diesel and the Injectors in February 1989 and peaked at 9 in Australia. A limited edition picture disc was released in May.

== Track listing ==
7" Single

1. "Soul Revival" - 4:05
2. "Who's For Better" - 3:32

12" / Vinyl

1. "Soul Revival" - 4:05
2. "Who's For Better" - 3:32
3. "Thang 1" - 6:11

12" (picture disc)

1. "Soul Revival"
2. "Burn" (Live)
3. "Rat Pack" (Live)
4. "Parisienne Hotel" (Live)
- Live tracks recorded for the Radio 1 Friday Rock Show on 14 April 1989.

== Charts ==
"Soul Revival" debuted at #19 in Australia in February 1989, before peaking at #9 in March.

=== Weekly charts ===
Chart (1989)	Peak position
Australia (ARIA)	9

=== Year-end charts ===
Chart (1989)	Peak position
Australia (ARIA)	51

== Credits ==
- Producer, Engineer, Mixed By – Terry Manning
- Bass – Johnny "Tatt" Dalzell
- Drums, Guitar – Yak Sherrit
- Guitar, Vocals – Johnny Diesel
- Saxophone, Backing Vocals – Bernie Bremond
