= Cry in Shame =

Single by Johnny Diesel and the Injectors

from the album Johnny Diesel and the Injectors
- B-side: "Dry Tears"
- Released: 17 April 1989
- Recorded: August 1988 – September 1988
- Studio: Ardent Studio and Alpha Sound, Memphis, Tennessee
- Genre: Hard rock, blues rock, soft rock
- Length: 4:43
- Label: Chrysalis Records
- Songwriter: Diesel
- Producer: Terry Manning

Johnny Diesel and the Injectors singles chronology
"Soul Revival" (1988)	"Cry in Shame" (1989)	"Lookin' for Love" (1989)

Alternative cover
- international version

"Cry in Shame" is a song by Australian rock group, Johnny Diesel and the Injectors. The song was released as the band's third single from their debut album Johnny Diesel and the Injectors in April 1989 and peaked at 10 in Australia, becoming the band's third top 10 single.

== Track listing ==
7" single

1. "Cry in Shame" (Edited Version)
2. "Dry Tears"

12" vinyl

1. "Cry in Shame" (Edited Version)
2. "Dry Tears"
3. "Comin' Home" (Live)
4. "Leave My Girl Alone" (Live)

== Charts ==
"Cry in Shame" debuted at number 39 in Australia in April 1989, before peaking at number 10 in May.

=== Weekly charts ===
Chart (1989)	Peak position
Australia (ARIA)	10

=== Year-end charts ===
Chart (1989)	Peak position
Australia (ARIA)	72

== Credits ==
- Producer, engineer, mixing – Terry Manning
- Bass – Johnny "Tatt" Dalzell
- Drums – Yak Sherrit
- Guitar, vocals – Johnny Diesel
- Saxophone, backing vocals – Bernie Bremond
