= Victoria (Dance Exponents song) =

Single by The Dance Exponents

from the album Prayers Be Answered
- Released: June 1982
- Genre: Rock
- Length: 3:26 (single version); 3:47 (Prayers Be Answered); 4:57 (Amplifier CD)
- Songwriter: Jordan Luck

The Dance Exponents singles chronology
| "Victoria" (1982) | "Airway Spies" (1982) |

"Victoria" is a song by the New Zealand rock band The Exponents from the band's 1983 album Prayers Be Answered. Released in June 1982 as the band's first single, it reached Number 6 on the New Zealand singles chart. The song was selected by a panel of New Zealand songwriters to have been the #8 top 100 New Zealand songs of all time.

== Background ==
"Victoria" was inspired by Jordan Luck's landlady in Christchurch, with the name Victoria used as a pseudonym (her real name was Vicky). She successfully ran an escort agency but lived with an abusive man: Luck questioned her relationship with the line "What do you see in him?".

"Victoria was 23 and earned [sic] the whole apartment block. She was a hard worker. And yes, she read Alvin Toffler. But we'd wake up in the morning and she'd be bruised because her boyfriend was beating her up."

— Jordan Luck, New Zealand Herald

The band moved to Auckland before the release of the song. After the single became a success, Luck visited "Victoria" in Christchurch and was happy to find that she not only loved the song but had also split up with her abusive boyfriend.

== Music video ==
A video was funded by the New Zealand Broadcasting Association but, unusually for the time, included a story rather than just a studio performance. Shot in the band's hometown of Christchurch, it shows Luck as "Victoria"'s taxi driver and Al Park, a singer-songwriter sometimes credited as the father figure for the "Lyttelton Sound" and the first person to bring punk music to Christchurch. In 2019, Luck covered Park's "I Walked Away" for the covers collection Better Already - The Songs Of Al Park.

== Alternative versions ==
The recording of "Victoria" on the Prayers Be Answered album differs from the original single. Another version was also included on the 1992 CD release of the 1986 Amplifier album.

== Charts ==
| Chart (1982) | Peak position |
|---|---|
| New Zealand (Recorded Music NZ) | 6 |

== Certifications ==
| Region | Certification | Certified units/sales |
|---|---|---|
| New Zealand (RMNZ) | 2× Platinum | 60,000^{‡} |
^{‡} Sales+streaming figures based on certification alone.
