= Lookin' for Love (Diesel song) =

Single by Johnny Diesel and the Injectors

from the album Johnny Diesel and the Injectors
- B-side: "Cut Back"
- Released: June 1989
- Recorded: Ardent Studio and Alpha Sound, Memphis, Tennessee; August 1988 - September 1988
- Genre: Rock, Garage rock
- Length: 3:29
- Label: Chrysalis Records
- Songwriter(s): Diesel
- Producer(s): Terry Manning

Johnny Diesel and the Injectors singles chronology
"Cry In Shame" (1988)	"Lookin' for Love" (1989)	"Since I Fell for You" (1989)

"Lookin' for Love" is a song by Australian rock group, Johnny Diesel and the Injectors. The song was released as the band's fourth single from their debut album Johnny Diesel and the Injectors in June 1989 and peaked at 28 in Australia. The single was released to coincide with the band's first ever national headline tour throughout August 1989.

== Track listing ==
7" Single

1. "Lookin' For Love" (3:29)
2. "Cut Back" (3:05)

12" / Vinyl

1. "Lookin' For Love" (3:29)
2. "Cut Back" (3:05)
3. "You Don't Know"
- "Cut Back" was a bonus track on the British version of the album.
- "You Don't Know" was recorded in 1987 at Rhinoceros Recordings, Sydney NSW.

== Charts ==
“Lookin' for Love” debuted at #32 in Australia in July 1989, before peaking at #28 the following month.

=== Weekly charts ===
Chart (1989)	Peak position
Australia (ARIA)	28

== Credits ==
- Producer, Engineer, Mixed By – Terry Manning
- Bass – Johnny "Tatt" Dalzell
- Drums – Yak Sherrit
- Guitar, Vocals – Johnny Diesel
- Saxophone, Backing Vocals – Bernie Bremond
