= Grassy Knoll (album) =

Studio album by The Exponents
- Released: September 1994
- Recorded: 1994
- Studio: Megaphon Studios (Sydney)
- Genre: Rock
- Length: 49:27
- Label: Phonogram
- Producer: David Hemming

The Exponents chronology
Something Beginning with C (1992)	Grassy Knoll (1994)	Once Bitten, Twice Bitten: The Singles 1981-1995 (1995)

Singles from Grassy Knoll
- 1. "House of Love" Released: January 1994; 2. "Like She Said" Released: August 1994; 3. "Don't Say Goodbye" Released: November 1994

Grassy Knoll is the fifth studio album by the New Zealand band The Exponents, released in September 1994. The album reached number 9 in the New Zealand Album charts and went gold. In May 2013, Universal Music re-released the album digitally in New Zealand in remastered standard and deluxe editions. The deluxe edition has six additional tracks of a single B-side and live recordings.

== Track listing ==
All tracks are written by Jordan Luck except where noted.

No.	Title	Writer(s)	Length
1.	"Happy Loving People"		3:56
2.	"Like She Said"		3:08
3.	"Fate"		4:44
4.	"Losing You"		4:55
5.	"Don't Say Goodbye"		5:03
6.	"House of Love"		4:01
7.	"Day By Day"	Luck; David Gent	5:03
8.	"Couple of Things"		5:01
9.	"Helen"		4:32
10.	"It Didn't and It Does"		3:53
11.	"Baby I'll See You Later" (hidden track)		5:11
Total length:			49:27

Bonus tracks on digital deluxe release
No.	Title	Writer(s)	Length
12.	"So This Is Love"	Phil Judd	3:44
13.	"I'll Say Goodbye (Even Though I'm Blue)" (live)		4:35
14.	"Whatever Happened to Tracey" (live)	Luck; Chris Sheehan	3:14
15.	"Sometimes" (live)		4:30
16.	"Erotic" (live)		5:42
17.	"Why Does Love Do This to Me" (live)		4:20

== Personnel ==
Personnel as listed in the album's liner notes are:

=== The Exponents ===
- Jordan Luck — vocals
- David Gent — bass guitar
- Michael "Harry" Harallambi — drums

=== Additional musicians ===
- Dave Dobbyn — guitar, backing vocals
- Brent Williams — guitar (1–5, 7–11)
- Trish Young — duet vocals (5)
- Ken Stewart — backing vocals (5)
- Paul Skates — guitar, backing vocals (6)

=== Production ===
- David Hemming — engineering, production
- Jason Blackwell — engineering
- Spiro Fousketakis — mixing
- Don Bartley — mastering
- Dan Sheehan — cover artwork

== Charts ==
Chart (1994)	Peak position
New Zealand Albums (RMNZ)	9
