= The Exponents =

New Zealand rock group, formerly known as The Dance Exponents

- Also known as: The Dance Exponents (1981-1987)
- Origin: Washdyke, Timaru, New Zealand
- Years active: 1981–2000; 2005-06; 2010–13; 2023
- Members: Jordan Luck; David Gent; Brian Jones; Michael "Harry" Harallambi
- Past members: Steve Cowan; Martin Morris; Chris Sheehan; Steve Birss; Eddie Olson; David Barraclough; Steve Simpson

The Exponents, formerly The Dance Exponents, is a New Zealand rock group led by vocalist and songwriter Jordan Luck.

Their major hits are "Victoria", "Why Does Love Do This To Me", "Who Loves Who The Most" and, "I'll Say Goodbye (Even Though I'm Blue)".

== History ==
=== 1980s: The Dance Exponents ===
The group formed in 1981 after vocalist Jordan Luck and guitarist Brian Jones disbanded their first group, Basement, and relocated from the South Canterbury town of Timaru to Christchurch with their ex-Splash Alley friend, Steve "Fingers" Cowan. Searching for a drummer in Christchurch, the trio met David Gent (bass) and Michael "Harry" Harallambi (drums) from punk band Channel 4. Cowan moved from guitar to keyboards and the five piece became the Dance Exponents. Their first gig was at the Hillsborough Tavern on Luck's 20th birthday and Cowan's 22nd – 15 October 1981. A residency at Christchurch's Aranui Tavern quickly earned them a strong live reputation, and on the recommendation of Jim Wilson they were signed by Mushroom Records by Mike Chunn in 1982.

The band's debut single "Victoria", released in mid-1982 was a top ten hit and was the start of a run of successful songs by Luck. Steve Cowan left the group after the release of "Victoria" and was replaced by Martin Morris who only spent six months with the band and left before they began recording their debut album. Cowan died in 1986.

With their popularity growing nationally from extensive touring, TVNZ recorded them live at Mainstreet cabaret in Auckland. The show was simulcast on television and FM radio and the companion album released in June 1983 called Live at Mainstreet saw six songs from the Dance Exponents on one side of the album with four songs from the Legionnaires on the other side.

In December 1983 the group's debut album Prayers Be Answered was released. The album featured re-recordings of "Victoria", "Your Best Friend Loves Me Too", "Poland" and "All I Can Do" and two further singles, "Know Your Own Heart", and "I'll Say Goodbye (Even Though I'm Blue)". The album stayed in the NZ Album chart for nearly a year, selling double platinum in the process.

Chris Sheehan joined the band on guitar in late 1983 and brought a new edge to the group, best heard on his first recording with them; the Julian Mendlesohn produced single "Sex & Agriculture". In late 1984 Harry left the group and moved to Auckland where he drummed for Grey Parade. He was replaced for a short while by Christchurch drummer Steve Birss, who played only a handful of shows.

As Birss had not had time to settle with the band before they recorded their second album, Vince Ely from the Psychedelic Furs was hired by producer Ian (Fab) Taylor to drum on the album. The album was called Expectations and featured the singles "My Love For You", "Christchurch (In Cashel St. I Wait)" and the Australian only single "Greater Hopes. Greater Expectations" . It was released in New Zealand in May 1985, and shortly before that Eddie Olson joined the band on drums for the nationwide "Expectations" tour.

The band's third album Amplifier was co produced by John Jansen and Doug Rogers and released on Roger's Zulu label in 1986. Amplifier featured the single "Caroline Skies" and re-recordings of "Sex and Agriculture" and "Only I Could Die (And Love You Still)". After only a moderate response to the album, Eddie Olson left the group and the band moved to Britain in 1987 and attracted A&R interest, but did not gain a record contract. During their four-year hiatus in the UK, Luck continued to write and accumulated a number of strong songs which were demoed by the band.

=== 1990s: The Exponents ===
Interest in the UK demos from PolyGram Records NZ brought the band back to New Zealand in 1990, although Sheehan remained in the UK and went on to form the Starlings. In New Zealand, Harry rejoined the group and to mark the new start of the four original members, they dropped the "Dance" from their name to become The Exponents. Their subsequent 1992 album for PolyGram Something Beginning with C, yielded the group's biggest hits of their career in "Why Does Love Do This to Me" and "Who Loves Who the Most" and the album became the band's first number 1 record in New Zealand. It is included in Nick Bollinger's book "100 Essential New Zealand Albums".

In 1992, the Exponents relocated to Sydney to record their fifth album Grassy Knoll. The album delivered the singles "Like She Said", "Don't Say Goodbye" and "House of Love". With limited promotion in New Zealand, Grassy Knoll was certified gold but failed to match the success of Something Beginning With C.

Following the release of Grassy Knoll, the band met Rockingham-raised Dave "Duck" Barraclough in Sydney in 1994 and he joined them as guitarist and songwriting partner to Luck. His first contribution to the group was his song "La La Lulu", which was backed by a song co-written with Luck called "Summer You Never Meant". "La La Lulu" returned the band to the singles charts and the two songs featured on the group's first hits compilation entitled Once Bitten, Twice Bitten – The Singles 1981–1995 which was released in 1995. The album peaked at Number 1 on the New Zealand album charts and selling 5×Platinum. In 1996, the group recorded a final, one-off single for Warner Music entitled "Do You Feel in Love".

In 1997, the Exponents signed to Sony Music and released their sixth studio album Better Never Than Late, which featured the singles "One in a Lifetime", "Close" and "Change Your Mind". Produced by Eddie Rayner and the Exponents, it reached number 3 on the album chart.

In 1999, Dave Gent took a break from the group and Steve Simpson was drafted in on bass. Shortly after, the Exponents decided to call it quits and went out on a final New Zealand tour in support of their final album Hello, Love You, Goodbye. The record featured Simpson on bass with six new tracks and 8 live tracks recorded at the Poenamo Hotel in Takapuna in 1999. Following the tour, Barraclough returned to Australia and joined Mental As Anything.

=== 2000s: Reformation ===
Luck formed his own band, Luck, playing Exponents songs and new compositions with songwriting partner Bryan Bell and he continues to play in the Jordan Luck Band today.

Brian Jones returned to New Zealand in the early 2000s and began working with former Bird Nest Roys singer Little Ross Hollands in their new group the Diamond Rings which also included a rhythm section of fellow Exponents David Gent and Harry. The Diamond Rings released their debut album The Rasper in June 2009.

In 2005 the four original Exponents – Luck, Gent, Jones and Harry got together to record "Geraldine" and "Or a Girl I Knew" with producer Neil Finn for inclusion in a new Exponents hits compilation called Sex and Agriculture: The Very Best of The Exponents. The album featured one disc of the hits and a second of b-sides and rarities. They played a few shows in support of the album which went platinum and reached number 7 on the charts.

The four reunited again in 2010 to play at the "Band Together" benefit concert for the 2010 Canterbury earthquake. Their 1985 hit "Christchurch (In Cashel Street I Wait)" became the theme song for the concert and the band closed the show with a mass chorus of the song featuring all the artists who performed at the concert.

October 2011 marked the 30th anniversary of the group and on 14 November of that year, almost 30 years after the Dance Exponents first ever show in Christchurch, Jordan, Brian, Dave and Harry got together to play a one-off show at the Ferrymead Speights Alehouse, a venue very close to the Hillsborough Tavern where the band made their debut three decades earlier. To mark the occasion, Universal Music released a new best of album called Why Does Love Do This to Me: The Exponents Greatest Hits.

The group's anniversary sparked interest in the band's story from Notable Pictures, who secured funding and support from Prime Television and NZ On Air to produce a feature television documentary about the band. Production commenced in August 2012 and in addition to telling the group's story it documented their return to Neil Finn's Roundhead Studios in Auckland to record some of their earliest songs, most of which had never been recorded or released. Simply entitled The Exponents, the documentary first screened on New Zealand television on Prime on 22 May 2013.

The result of their documentary sessions at the studio was a new album Eight Days at Roundhead that featured seven new recordings, an acoustic version of Caroline Skies and two tracks the band recorded with Neil Finn in 2005. Eight Days at Roundhead was released on 10 May 2013 as a stand-alone digital album and as bonus album packaged with the Exponents Greatest Hits album.

In December 2014 the Exponents heard the news that Chris Sheehan, who had done so much to shape the group's sound in the eighties, had died in Spain after a long battle with cancer.

On 13 October 2015, Recorded Music NZ and The New Zealand Herald announced that the 2015 New Zealand Herald Legacy Award recipients would be The Exponents. The New Zealand Herald Legacy Award pays tribute to notable and celebrated Kiwi artists who have helped shape the NZ music industry. In addition to being presented with the Legacy Award at the Vodafone New Zealand Music Awards on 19 November 2015, The Exponents were inducted into the NZ Music Hall of Fame, joining Jordan Luck who was already there in recognition of his outstanding contribution to New Zealand songwriting. Along with Luck, Jones, Gent and Harry, Recorded Music New Zealand included Steve Cowan, Chris Sheehan and Dave Barraclough into the Hall of Fame induction to recognise their extensive contributions to the group.

In April 2018, Dave Barraclough died from pancreatic cancer. "There will be no funeral," Luck said. "David has just gone out to buy some strings."

In April 2023, The Exponents reunited for a 10-date sold-out tour of New Zealand.

== Members ==
=== Line-up ===
- Jordan Luck – lead vocals (1981–1987, 1991-1999, 2005, 2010, 2011, 2012-2013, 2023)
- Brian Jones – guitar and backing vocals (1981-1987, 1991-1994, 2005, 2010, 2011, 2012-2013, 2023)
- David Gent – bass guitar (1981-1987, 1991-1999, 2005, 2010, 2011, 2012-2013, 2023)
- Michael "Harry" Harallambi – drums (1981-1984, 1991-1999, 2005, 2010, 2011, 2012-2013, 2023)

=== Past members ===
- Steve Cowan – keyboards (1981-1982)
- Martin Morris – keyboards (1982-1983)
- Chris Sheehan – guitar (1984-1987)
- Vince Ely — drums (1984-1985)
- Steve Birss – drums (1984-1985)
- Eddie Olson – drums and occasional vocals (1985-1987)
- Dave Barraclough – guitar (1994-1999)
- Steve Simpson – bass guitar (1999)

== Discography ==
=== Albums ===
Title	Details	Peak chart position	Certifications
Title	Details	NZ	Certifications
as the Dance Exponents
Prayers Be Answered	Released: December 1983; Label: Mushroom (L 38077); Format: LP, cassette	4	NZ: Platinum
Expectations	Released: May 1985; Label: Mushroom (RML 53163); Format: LP, cassette	7	NZ: Gold
Amplifier	Released: November 1986; Label: Zulu (ZLP001); Format: LP, cassette	18	
as the Exponents
Something Beginning With C	Released: March 1992; Label: Mercury (512 210-2); Format: CD, cassette	1	NZ: 3× Platinum
Grassy Knoll	Released: September 1994; Label: Phonogram (522 913-2); Format: CD, Cassette	9	NZ: Gold
Better Never Than Late	Released: May 1997; Label: Sony Music NZ (487708-9); Format: CD	3	
Hello, Love You, Goodbye	Released: December 1999; Label: Sony Music NZ (496324-2); Format: CD	48	
Eight Days at Roundhead	Released: 10 May 2013; Label: Universal Music NZ (1442643600); Format: CD, digital download	–	
"—" denotes releases that did not chart or were not released.

=== Live albums ===
Title	Details	Peak chart position	Certifications
Title	Details	NZ	Certifications
as the Dance Exponents
Live at Mainstreet (with the Legionnaires)	Released: June 1983; Label: Mushroom (L 38017); Format: LP, cassette; Recorded at the Mainstreet Cabaret in Auckland on 13 May 1983	3	

=== Compilation albums ===
List of compilation albums, with New Zealand chart positions
Title	Details	Peak chart position	Certifications
Title	Details	NZ	Certifications
Once Bitten, Twice Bitten: The Singles 1981-1995	Released: December 1995; Label: Warner Music NZ (063012558-2); Format: CD	1	NZ: 5× Platinum
Sex and Agriculture: The Very Best of The Exponents	Released: November 2005; Label: Universal Music NZ (9875421); Format: CD	7	NZ: Platinum
Why Does Love Do This to Me: The Exponents Greatest Hits	Released: November 2011; Label: Universal Music NZ (2786842); Format: CD	26	

=== Singles ===
List of singles, with New Zealand chart positions
Title	Year	Peak chart positions	Certifications	Album
Title	Year	NZ	Certifications	Album
as the Dance Exponents
"Victoria"	1982	6	RMNZ: Platinum x2	Prayers Be Answered
"Airway Spies"	1982	11		Non-album single
"All I Can Do"	1983	23		Prayers Be Answered
"Know Your Own Heart"	1983	19		Prayers Be Answered
"Your Best Friend Loves Me Too"	1983	—		Prayers Be Answered
"I'll Say Goodbye (Even Though I'm Blue)"	1984	18	RMNZ: Platinum	Prayers Be Answered
"Sex and Agriculture"	1984	11		Non-album single
"My Love for You"	1985	14		Expectations
"Christchurch (In Cashel St I Wait)"	1985	—		Expectations
"Greater Hopes, Greater Expectations"	1985	—		Expectations
"Caroline Skies"	1986	24		Amplifier
"Only I Could Die (and Love You Still)"	1986	35		Amplifier
"Brand New Doll"	1987	—		Non-album single
as the Exponents
"Why Does Love Do This To Me"	1991	3	RMNZ: Platinum x4	Something Beginning With C
"Who Loves Who the Most"	1991	3	RMNZ: Platinum	Something Beginning With C
"Whatever Happened to Tracey"	1992	6		Something Beginning With C
"Sink Like a Stone"	1992	28		Something Beginning With C
"Erotic"	1992	27		Something Beginning With C
"House of Love"	1994	25		Grassy Knoll
"Like She Said"	1994	25		Grassy Knoll
"Don't Say Goodbye"	1994	—		Grassy Knoll
"La La Lulu / Summer You Never Meant"	1995	13		Once Bitten, Twice Bitten
"Do You Feel in Love"	1996	23		Non-album single
"One in a Lifetime"	1997	24		Better Never Than Late
"Close"	1997	—		Better Never Than Late
"Change Your Mind"	1997	—		Better Never Than Late
"It's Rugby"	2011	—		Why Does Love Do This To Me: The Exponents Greatest Hits

=== Videos ===
Year	Video	Director
1982	Victoria	Simon Morris
1982	Airway Spies	–
1982	All I Can Do	–
1983	Know Your Own Heart	–
1983	I'll Say Goodbye (Even Though I'm Blue)	–
1984	Sex & Agriculture	–
1985	My Love For You	Salik Silverstein
1985	Greater Hopes Greater Expectations	Salik Silverstein
1986	Only I Could Die (And Love You Still)	Salik Silverstein
1991	Why Does Love Do This To Me	Kerry Brown
1991	Who Loves Who The Most	Kerry Brown
1992	Whatever Happened To Tracy	Kerry Brown
1992	Sink Like A Stone	Kerry Brown
1993	Erotic	–
1994	House Of Love	–
1994	Like She Said	–
1995	La La Lulu	–
1996	Summer You Never Meant	–
1996	Do You Feel in Love	–
1997	One in a Lifetime	Andrew Moore
1997	Close	–
1997	Change Your Mind	–
1999	Big World Out Your Window	–
2011	It's Rugby	Andrew Moore

== Awards and nominations ==
=== Aotearoa Music Awards ===
The Aotearoa Music Awards (previously known as New Zealand Music Awards (NZMA)) are an annual awards night celebrating excellence in New Zealand music and have been presented annually since 1965.

Year	Nominee / work	Award	Result	Ref.
1982	The Dance Exponents	Most Promising Group	Won	
1983	Live At Mainstreet	Album of the Year	Nominated	
1984	Prayers Be Answered	Album of the Year	Won	
1984	"I'll Say Goodbye (Even Though I'm Blue)"	Single of the Year	Nominated	
1984	Tom Parkinson for "I'll Say Goodbye (Even Though I'm Blue)"	Music Video of the Year	Nominated	
1984	The Dance Exponents	Group of the Year	Won	
1984	Jordan Luck (Dance Exponents)	Male of the Year	Won	
1986	"Caroline Skies"	Best Song of the Year	Nominated	
1992	The Exponents	Group of the Year	Nominated	
1992	"Why Does Love Do This to Me"	Single of the Year	Won	
1992	Jordan Luck (Dance Exponents)	Male of the Year	Won	
1992	The Exponents	Most Promising Group	Won	
1993	The Exponents	Group of the Year	Nominated	
1996	The Exponents	Group of the Year	Nominated	
1996	"La La Lulu"	Single of the Year	Nominated	
1996	Malcolm Welsford for "La La Lulu" by The Exponents	Producer of the Year	Nominated	
1996	Malcolm Welsford for "La La Lulu" by The Exponents	Engineer of the Year	Nominated	
2000	Hello Love You Goodbye	Film Soundtrack / Cast Recording / Compilation	Nominated	
2015	The Exponents	New Zealand Music Hall of Fame	inductee	

=== APRA Awards ===
In 2001, to celebrate 75 years of its existence, APRA invited its members and an academy to vote on what they believe are to be New Zealand's top songs of all time. The Exponents had several songs appearing in the top 100:

- #8 – "Victoria"
- #47 – "Why Does Love Do This To Me"
- #89 – "I'll Say Goodbye"
