= Amplifier (Dance Exponents album) =

Studio album by Dance Exponents
- Released: November 1986
- Recorded: 1986
- Genre: Pop rock
- Length: 35:34 (LP release); 43:38 (CD release); 47:31 (digital release)
- Label: Zulu
- Producers: John Jansen; Doug Rogers

Dance Exponents chronology
Expectations (1985)	Amplifier (1986)	Something Beginning with C (1992)

Alternative cover
- The 1992 CD release used a different cover with the cover photos taken from the inside gatefold of the LP. The original cover was restored for the 2013 digital release.

Singles from Amplifier
- 1. "Caroline Skies" Released: August 1986; 2. "Only I Could Die (and Love You Still)" Released: November 1986

Amplifier is the third studio album by the New Zealand band Dance Exponents (later known as The Exponents), released in November 1986. The album peaked at #18 and spent four weeks on the New Zealand Album Chart. The CD version was released in 1992 with an alternative cover and two additional tracks. In May 2013, Universal Music re-released the album digitally for the first time in New Zealand in a remastered extended edition. The extended edition has the original LP cover and running order and adds three additional tracks, two from the CD release and one additional B-side. It also restores "Worldwide Wireless" to its full length after it was edited for the CD release.

== Track listing ==
=== LP release ===
Side one
No.	Title	Writer(s)	Length
1.	"Time X Space"	Chris Sheehan; Dance Exponents	4:33
2.	"Only I Could Die (and Love You Still)"	Sheehan; Jordan Luck	4:24
3.	"Sex & Agriculture"	Luck; Brian Jones	4:02
4.	"Halcyon Rain"	Luck; Steve Cowan	2:42
Total length:			15:41

Side two
No.	Title	Writer(s)	Length
5.	"Brodelia the Cat"	Luck	3:17
6.	"Birth of the Reds"	Sheehan; Luck	4:02
7.	"As I Love You"	Sheehan; Luck; B. Jones	4:11
8.	"Worldwide Wireless"	Sheehan; Luck; B. Jones; David Gent; Brendan Fitzgerald	3:58
9.	"Caroline Skies"	Luck	4:25
Total length:			19:53 35:34

=== CD release ===
No.	Title	Writer(s)	Length
1.	"Time X Space"	Sheehan; Dance Exponents	4:10
2.	"Only I Could Die (and Love You Still)"	Sheehan; Luck	4:35
3.	"Sex & Agriculture"	Luck; B. Jones	4:01
4.	"Halcyon Rain"	Luck; Cowan	3:42
5.	"Victoria"	Luck	4:58
6.	"Brodelia the Cat"	Luck	3:17
7.	"Birth of the Reds"	Sheehan; Luck	4:03
8.	"Brand New Doll"	Luck; Melvin Jones	3:39
9.	"As I Love You"	Sheehan; Luck; B. Jones	4:11
10.	"Worldwide Wireless"	Sheehan; Luck; B. Jones; Gent; Fitzgerald	3:42
11.	"Caroline Skies"	Luck	3:20
Total length:			43:38

=== Digital release ===
No.	Title	Writer(s)	Length
1.	"Time X Space"	Sheehan; Dance Exponents	4:06
2.	"Only I Could Die (and Love You Still)"	Sheehan; Luck	4:35
3.	"Sex & Agriculture"	Luck; B. Jones	4:01
4.	"Halcyon Rain"	Luck; Cowan	3:41
5.	"Brodelia the Cat"	Luck	3:14
6.	"Birth of the Reds"	Sheehan; Luck	4:02
7.	"As I Love You"	Sheehan; Luck; B. Jones	4:13
8.	"Worldwide Wireless"	Sheehan; Luck; B. Jones; Gent; Fitzgerald	3:56
9.	"Caroline Skies"	Luck	3:22
10.	"Victoria"	Luck	4:57
11.	"Brand New Doll"	Luck; M. Jones	3:37
12.	"One Sad River"	Luck	3:47
Total length:			47:31

== Personnel ==
Personnel as listed in the album's liner notes are:

=== The Dance Exponents ===
- Jordan Luck — vocals
- Brian Jones — guitar, vocals
- David Gent — bass guitar
- Chris Sheehan — guitars
- Eddie Olson — drums, vocals

=== Production ===
- John Jansen — producer, engineer
- Doug Rogers — producer, engineer
- Rhys Moody — engineer
- Nelson Ayres — assistant engineer

== Charts ==
Chart (1986)	Peak position
New Zealand Albums (RMNZ)	18
