= Man Alive (song) =

1992 single by Diesel

Single by Diesel

from the album Hepfidelity
- B-side: "Tell the Truth"
- Released: 11 May 1992
- Studio: Hot Tin Roof (Los Angeles, California)
- Length: 4:10
- Label: Chrysalis; EMI
- Songwriter(s): Diesel; Tom Deluca
- Producer(s): Don Gehman

Diesel singles chronology
| "Tip of My Tongue" (1992) | "Man Alive" (1992) | "One More Time" (1992) |

"Man Alive" is a song by Australian rock musician Diesel. It was included on his debut album, Hepfidelity (1992). The song peaked at number 20 in Australia and 25 in New Zealand. In October 1993, it was released in the United Kingdom through Parlophone.

== Track listings ==
Australian CD single

1. "Man Alive" – 4:10
2. "Tell The Truth" – 4:09

European CD single

1. "Man Alive" (Remix – single version) – 4:10
2. "Tip of My Tongue" (album version) – 4:12

UK CD single

1. "Man Alive"
2. "Get Lucky" (live)
3. "Rhythm Of Your Soul" (live)
4. "One More Time" (acoustic)

== Charts ==
| Chart (1992) | Peak position |
|---|---|
| Australia (ARIA) | 20 |
| New Zealand (Recorded Music NZ) | 25 |

== Release history ==
| Region | Date | Format(s) | Label(s) | Ref. |
|---|---|---|---|---|
| Australia | 11 May 1992 | CD; cassette | Chrysalis; EMI | |
| United Kingdom | 4 October 1993 | 7-inch vinyl; CD; cassette | Parlophone | |
| United Kingdom | 11 October 1993 | 12-inch vinyl | Parlophone | |
