= Come to Me (Diesel song) =

1991 single by Diesel

Single by Diesel

from the album Hepfidelity
- B-side: "Rear View Mirror"
- Released: 4 November 1991
- Studio: Studio 6 (Memphis, Tennessee)
- Length: 3:45
- Label: Chrysalis; EMI
- Songwriter: Diesel
- Producer: Terry Manning

Diesel singles chronology
"Love Junk" (1991)	"Come to Me" (1991)	"Tip of My Tongue" (1992)

Alternative cover
- International version

"Come to Me" is a song by Australian rock musician Diesel; it was his first release credited to "Diesel" instead of "Johnny Diesel". The song was included on his 1992 debut album, Hepfidelity, and when released in November 1991, it peaked at number eight in Australia and number three in New Zealand. It is certified gold in the latter country for selling over 5,000 copies.

== Track listings ==
Australian CD single

1. "Come to Me" – 4:24
2. "Something to You" – 4:46

Australian 7-inch single

A. "Come to Me" – 4:22
B. "Rear View Mirror" – 5:11

UK and European maxi-single

1. "Come to Me"
2. "Rear View Mirror"
3. "Come to Me" (dub mix)

== Charts ==
=== Weekly charts ===
Chart (1991–1992)	Peak position
Australia (ARIA)	8
New Zealand (Recorded Music NZ)	3

=== Year-end charts ===
Chart (1991)	Position
Australia (ARIA)	87

Chart (1992)	Position
New Zealand (RIANZ)	14

== Certifications ==
Region	Certification	Certified units/sales
New Zealand (RMNZ)	Gold	5,000^{*}
^{*} Sales figures based on certification alone.
