= Something Beginning with C =

Studio album by the Exponents
- Released: March 1992
- Recorded: 1990–1991
- Studio: Airforce Studios (Auckland)
- Genre: Rock
- Length: 50:05
- Label: Mercury
- Producers: Duffy; Paul Streekstra; The Exponents

The Exponents chronology
Amplifier (1986)	Something Beginning with C (1992)	Grassy Knoll (1994)

Singles from Something Beginning with C
- 1. "Why Does Love Do This To Me" Released: April 1991; 2. "Who Loves Who the Most" Released: August 1991; 3. "Whatever Happened to Tracey" Released: February 1992; 4. "Sink Like a Stone" Released: June 1992; 5. "Erotic" Released: November 1992

Something Beginning with C is the fourth studio album by New Zealand rock band the Exponents. It is the first release following the band's name change from "The Dance Exponents". Released in 1992, it reached number one and spent 19 weeks on the New Zealand Albums Chart and went three times platinum.

In May 2013, Universal Music re-released the album digitally in New Zealand in remastered standard and deluxe editions. The deluxe edition has thirteen additional tracks of B-sides and the original UK demo of "Why Does Love Do This To Me". The album title was a play on the original plan of the band's to have the initials of their albums spell 'peace'. Something Beginning with C followed the albums Prayers Be Answered, Expectations and Amplifier.

== Track listing ==
All tracks are written by Jordan Luck except where noted.

No.	Title	Writer(s)	Length
1.	"Come On In"		0:46
2.	"Please Please and Thank Yourself"		3:21
3.	"Why Does Love Do This To Me"		3:25
4.	"Sink Like a Stone"		2:21
5.	"Sometimes"		4:07
6.	"Whatever Happened to Tracey"	Luck; Chris Sheehan	2:50
7.	"I Loved You"		2:18
8.	"Erotic"		4:59
9.	"Who Loves Who the Most"		4:15
10.	"When She Was in Love"	David Gent; Michael Harallambi	5:13
11.	"Now Like Then"		3:03
12.	"Hold On"		3:12
13.	"Nameless Girl"		3:50
14.	"The Ghost I Knew"		3:25
15.	"There's Only One Love for This Love"		3:00
Total length:			50:05

Bonus tracks on digital deluxe release
No.	Title	Writer(s)	Length
16.	"It Means I Mean You"		3:52
17.	"Fuck"	Luck; Sheehan	2:31
18.	"Interesting Thing"		2:34
19.	"What's Left of Love"		2:55
20.	"Are You Sure"	Luck; Gent	3:23
21.	"Close"		2:52
22.	"Hey Girl Groove!"		4:13
23.	"Only Virtually Mine"		2:43
24.	"Sadness"		2:34
25.	"Talking About That Girl"		4:21
26.	"Why Does Love Do This To Me" (original demo)		3:52
27.	"Harry's End Piece"	Luck; Gent; Brian Jones; Harallambi	1:28
28.	"Cake Mix"	Gent; Jones; Harallambi	4:44

== Personnel ==
Personnel as listed in the album's liner notes are:

=== The Exponents ===
- Jordan Luck — vocals
- Brian Jones — guitar, vocals
- David Gent — bass guitar
- Michael "Harry" Harallambi — drums

=== Production ===
- Mike Duffy — mixing engineer and producer (1-2, 4-15)
- Karen Opie — assistant engineer (1-2, 4-15)
- Nigel Foster — engineer (1-2, 4-15)
- Paul Streekstra — engineer, producer (3)
- Chad Taylor — cover design
- Darryl Ward — photography

== Charts ==
=== Weekly charts ===
Chart (1992)	Peak position
New Zealand Albums (RMNZ)	1

=== Year-end charts ===
Chart (1992)	Position
New Zealand Albums (RMNZ)	26
