= Tip of My Tongue (Diesel song) =

1992 single by Diesel

Single by Diesel

from the album Hepfidelity
- B-side: "Rear View Mirror"
- Released: 27 January 1992
- Studio: Hot Tin Roof (Los Angeles)
- Length: 4:12
- Label: Chrysalis, EMI
- Songwriters: Diesel, John Daniel Tate
- Producer: Don Gehman

Diesel singles chronology
"Come to Me" (1991)	"Tip of My Tongue" (1992)	"Man Alive" (1992)

"Tip of My Tongue" is a song by Australian rock musician Diesel. It was included on his debut album, Hepfidelity (1992). Released in January 1992, the song peaked at number four in Australia and number three in New Zealand. At the ARIA Music Awards of 1993, the song was nominated for Single of the Year, losing to "The Day You Went Away" by Wendy Matthews.

The song was used by the Seven Network in Australia during score updates in its AFL coverage during the 1990s.

== Track listings ==
Australian CD single

1. "Tip of My Tongue" – 4:12
2. "Rear View Mirror" – 5:12

European maxi-CD single

1. "Tip of My Tongue" – 4:12
2. "Come to Me" – 4:22
3. "One Thing After Another" – 5:03

Vinyl

1. "Tip of My Tongue" – 4:12
2. "Tell the Truth"

== Charts ==
=== Weekly charts ===
Chart (1992)	Peak position
Australia (ARIA)	4
Germany (GfK)	77
New Zealand (Recorded Music NZ)	3

=== Year-end charts ===
Chart (1992)	Position
Australia (ARIA)	65
New Zealand (RIANZ)	45

== Certifications ==
Region	Certification	Certified units/sales
New Zealand (RMNZ)	Platinum	30,000^{‡}
^{‡} Sales+streaming figures based on certification alone.
