= One More Time (Diesel song) =

1992 single by Diesel

Single by Diesel

from the album Hepfidelity
- B-side: "One More Time" (acoustic)
- Released: 10 August 1992
- Studio: Hot Tin Roof (Los Angeles)
- Length: 4:10
- Label: Chrysalis
- Songwriters: Diesel, J. L. Williams
- Producer: Don Gehman

Diesel singles chronology
"Man Alive" (1992)	"One More Time" (1992)	"Never Miss Your Water" (1993)

"One More Time" is a song by Australian rock musician Diesel. It was released as the fifth and final single from his debut album, Hepfidelity (1992), in August 1992. It peaked at number 59 in Australia and 39 in New Zealand.

== Track listing ==
CD single

1. "One More Time" – 4:07
2. "One More Time" (acoustic) – 3:40

== Charts ==
Chart (1992)	Peak position
Australia (ARIA)	59
New Zealand (Recorded Music NZ)	39
