= Prayers Be Answered =

Studio album by The Dance Exponents
- Released: December 1983
- Recorded: 1983
- Studio: Mandrill Studios
- Genre: Pop rock
- Length: 38:28
- Label: Mushroom
- Producer: Dave Marett

The Dance Exponents chronology
Live at Mainstreet (1983)	Prayers Be Answered (1983)	Expectations (1985)

Singles from Prayers Be Answered
- 1. "Victoria" Released: June 1982; 2. "All I Can Do" Released: May 1983; 3. "Know Your Own Heart" Released: October 1983; 4. "Your Best Friend Loves Me Too" Released: December 1983; 5. "I'll Say Goodbye (Even Though I'm Blue)" Released: April 1984

Prayers Be Answered is the debut studio album by New Zealand band the Dance Exponents, released in December 1983. The album peaked at #4 and spent 45 weeks on the New Zealand Album charts.

The album won the Best Album award at the 1984 New Zealand Music Awards.

In May 2013, Universal Music re-released the album digitally in New Zealand in remastered standard and deluxe editions. The deluxe edition has twelve additional tracks of singles, B-sides, rarities and demos.

== Track listing ==
All tracks are written by Jordan Luck except where noted.

Side one
No.	Title	Length
1.	"All I Can Do"	2:40
2.	"Know Your Own Heart"	3:30
3.	"Shattered Ornaments"	3:30
4.	"Victoria"	3:47
5.	"Your Best Friend Loves Me Too"	2:41
6.	"I'll Say Goodbye (Even Though I'm Blue)"	2:51
Total length:		18:59

Side two
No.	Title	Writer(s)	Length
7.	"Checking to See That Your Kiss Is the Same"	Luck; Brian Jones	2:42
8.	"Just Me and You"		3:42
9.	"Envy the Grave"	Luck; Jones; David Gent	4:05
10.	"Swimming to the Table of an Unknown Girl"		3:38
11.	"Gone Forever in Another Car"		3:02
12.	"Poland"		2:20
Total length:			19:29 38:28

Bonus tracks on digital deluxe release
No.	Title	Length
13.	"Airway Spies"	2:49
14.	"Victoria" (original single version)	3:26
15.	"All I Can Do" (original single version)	2:40
16.	"Your Best Friend Loves Me Too" (original version)	2:39
17.	"Poland" (original version)	2:22
18.	"Can't Kiss the Lips of a Memory"	2:30
19.	"I'm Not the One"	3:08
20.	"Social Life"	2:10
21.	"Perfect Romance" (demo)	2:53
22.	"My Date with You Was a Date with No One" (demo)	3:53
23.	"Walk Around the Roses" (demo)	3:46
24.	"The Empty Bunk in the Bunkhouse"	3:06

== Personnel ==
Personnel as listed in the album's liner notes are:

=== The Dance Exponents ===
- Jordan Luck — vocals
- Brian Jones — guitar
- David Gent — bass guitar
- Michael "Harry" Harallambi — drums

=== Additional musicians ===
- Peter Van Der Fluit, Andrew McLennan, Stuart Pearce — keyboards
- Andrew Clouston — saxophone

=== Production ===
- Dave Marett — producer, engineer
- Graeme Myhre — engineer
- Tim Kramer — mixing engineer (tracks 1, 2, 5)
- Alan Scholz — cover artwork and design

== Charts ==
=== Weekly charts ===
Chart (1983–84)	Peak position
New Zealand Albums (RMNZ)	4

=== Year-end charts ===
Chart (1984)	Position
New Zealand Albums (RMNZ)	14
