= Hepfidelity =

Studio album by Diesel
- Released: 2 March 1992
- Length: 47:53
- Label: Chrysalis; EMI
- Producer: Don Gehman; Terry Manning

Diesel chronology
Live in London (1989)	Hepfidelity (1992)	The Lobbyist (1993)

Singles from Hepfidelity
- 1. "Love Junk" Released: June 1991; 2. "Come to Me" Released: October 1991; 3. "Tip of My Tongue" Released: January 1992; 4. "Man Alive" Released: May 1992; 5. "One More Time" Released: October 1992

Hepfidelity is the second studio album by Australian singer-songwriter Diesel. The album was released in March 1992 through Chrysalis Records and EMI Records, and held the number-one spot on the Australian ARIA Albums Chart for four weeks, and it also topped New Zealand's RIANZ Albums Chart. The album includes the singles "Love Junk", "Come to Me", "Tip of My Tongue", "Man Alive" and "One More Time".

The album was certified 3× platinum in Australia.

Hepfidelity was rereleased in Europe in 1993 with 3 bonus studio tracks. These tracks were also released on the 1993 album The Lobbyist.

The album was remastered in 2022 for its 30th anniversary as Hepfidelity 30 with a second disc of previously unreleased tracks.

== Track listing ==
No.	Title	Writer(s)	Length
1.	"Man Alive"	Diesel, Tom DeLuca	4:48
2.	"Tip of My Tongue"	Diesel, John Daniel Tate	4:12
3.	"Too Much of a Good Thing"	Diesel, J. L. Williams	4:18
4.	"One More Time"	Diesel, J. L. Williams	4:03
5.	"Get Lucky"	Diesel, D. Walker	4:33
6.	"There's a Love"	A. Gorrie, M. Lunn	4:27
7.	"Love Junk"	Diesel	3:46
8.	"Come to Me"	Diesel	5:43
9.	"Save a Little Lovin'"	Diesel, J. L. Williams	5:17
10.	"Picture of You"	Diesel, T. Brock, J. L. Williams	5:10
11.	"One Thing After Another"	Diesel, A. Gorrie, M. Lunn	5:03

Hepfidelity 30 Disc 2
No.	Title	Length
1.	"Ride"
2.	"By the Gun"
3.	"Change"
4.	"Mercurial Girl"
5.	"Turned It All Around"
6.	"Can We Get Closer"
7.	"Heart of Stone"
8.	"Whats She Got"
9.	"Power"
10.	"Piece of You"

== Personnel ==
- Engineered by Rick Will and Mark Desisto
- Assisted by Stoli Jaeger
- Produced by Terry Manning,
- Mixed by Paul Lani and Rick Will
- String arrangements written and conducted by Carl Marsh
- Recorded at Hot Tin Roof Studios, Los Angeles and Studio Six, Memphis (TN)

== Charts ==
=== Weekly charts ===
Chart (1992)	Peak position
Australian Albums (ARIA)	1
New Zealand Albums (RMNZ)	1

=== Year-end charts ===
Chart (1992)	Position
Australian Albums (ARIA)	4
New Zealand Albums (RMNZ)	4

== Certifications ==
Region	Certification	Certified units/sales
Australia (ARIA)	3× Platinum	210,000^{^}
New Zealand (RMNZ)	Platinum	15,000^{^}
^{^} Shipments figures based on certification alone.

== See also ==
- List of number-one albums in Australia during the 1990s
- Hepfidelity and More
