= Expectations (Dance Exponents album) =

Studio album by The Dance Exponents
- Released: May 1985
- Recorded: 1984/85
- Genre: Pop rock
- Length: 43:24
- Label: Mushroom
- Producer: Ian Taylor

The Dance Exponents chronology
Prayers Be Answered (1983)	Expectations (1985)	Amplifier (1986)

Singles from Expectations
- 1. "My Love for You" Released: April 1985; 2. "Christchurch (In Cashel St I Wait)" Released: 1985; 3. "Greater Hopes, Greater Expectations" Released: 1985

Expectations is the second studio album by the New Zealand band the Dance Exponents, released in 1985. The album peaked at #7 and spent eight weeks on the New Zealand Album chart. The album was released on CD in 1999 with three extra tracks. In May 2013, Universal Music re-released the album digitally in New Zealand in remastered standard and deluxe editions. The deluxe edition has six additional tracks of singles, B-sides, rarities and demos.

== Track listing ==
All tracks are written by Jordan Luck except where noted.

Side one
No.	Title	Writer(s)	Length
1.	"These Oceans Wave & Tide Us In"	Luck; Brian Jones	3:49
2.	"Christchurch (In Cashel St. I Wait)"	Luck; Jones; David Gent	4:15
3.	"Raining, Running Through the Rainforest"		3:01
4.	"Prayers Be Answered"		4:15
5.	"Ashened Ashened Autumn Leaves"	Luck; Chris Sheehan	5:18
Total length:			20:38

Side two
No.	Title	Writer(s)	Length
6.	"Only I Could Die (and Love You Still)"	Luck; Sheehan	4:16
7.	"Weeping Soul"		2:56
8.	"Losing the Sun, the Moon and You"		3:34
9.	"My Love for You"	Luck; Jones	3:22
10.	"Skies of Sunset"		4:34
11.	"Greater Hopes, Greater Expectations"		4:04
Total length:			22:46 43:24

Bonus tracks on 1999 CD release
No.	Title	Writer(s)	Length
12.	"All I Can Do"		2:41
13.	"The Empty Bunk in the Bunkhouse"		3:08
14.	"Sex & Agriculture"	Luck; Jones	3:40

Bonus tracks on 2013 digital deluxe release
No.	Title	Writer(s)	Length
12.	"Sex & Agriculture"	Luck; Jones	3:40
13.	"Christchurch (In Cashel St. I Wait)" (extended 12″ mix)	Luck; Jones; Gent	6:01
14.	"Sex & Agriculture" (extended 12″ mix)	Luck; Jones	5:57
15.	"There's Only One Love for This Love" (demo)		3:07
16.	"My Love for You" (1984 demo)	Luck; Jones	3:23
17.	"Sex & Agriculture" (instrumental)	Luck; Jones	3:53

== Personnel ==
Personnel as listed in the album's liner notes are:

=== The Dance Exponents ===
- David Gent — bass guitar
- Brian Jones — guitars, backing vocals
- Jordan Luck — vocals
- Chris Sheehan — guitars, piano, bass guitar
- Vince Ely — drums, percussion, wind chimes

=== Production ===
- Ian Taylor — producer, engineer
- Tim Field, Guy Gray — engineers
- Nikko Chunn — cover painting
- Philip Peacock - photography

== Charts ==
Chart (1985)	Peak position
New Zealand Albums (RMNZ)	7
