= Johnny Diesel and the Injectors =

Album by Johnny Diesel

Johnny Diesel & the Injectors

Studio album by Johnny Diesel & the Injectors
- Released: 6 March 1989
- Recorded: August–September 1988
- Studio: Ardent Studio and Alpha Sound, Memphis, Tennessee
- Genre: Rock; blues; Hard rock
- Length: 52:27
- Label: Chrysalis
- Producer: Terry Manning

Johnny Diesel & the Injectors chronology
Johnny Diesel & the Injectors (1989)	Live in London (1989)

Singles from Johnny Diesel & the Injectors
- 1. "Don't Need Love" Released: October 1988; 2. "Soul Revival" Released: February 1989; 3. "Cry in Shame" Released: April 1989; 4. "Lookin' for Love" Released: June 1989; 5. "Since I Fell for You" Released: 1989

Johnny Diesel & the Injectors is the debut album by Australian rock band Johnny Diesel & the Injectors, which was released in 1989. The album peaked at number 2 on the ARIA singles chart and won two ARIA Music Awards.

== Background ==
Johnny Diesel & the Injectors were formed in Perth in 1986 by Mark Lizotte p.k.a. Johnny Diesel on lead guitar and lead vocals, Bernie Bremond on saxophone and vocals, John "Tatt" Dalzell on bass guitar, George Dalstrom on guitar and John "Yak" Sherritt on drums. Without Dalstrom the group relocated to Sydney in September 1987. They supported Jimmy Barnes on his Freight Train Heart Tour during November. By mid-1988 they were signed to Chrysalis Records. The four-piece group recorded their debut album, Johnny Diesel & the Injectors, from August to September in Memphis, Tennessee with Terry Manning producing.

== Track listing ==
all tracks written by Mark Lizotte except where noted.

No.	Title	Length
1.	"Lookin' for Love"	3:32
2.	"Parisienne Hotel"	4:03
3.	"Cry In Shame"	4:45
4.	"Comin' Home"	4:37
5.	"Since I Fell for You" (Buddy Johnson)	5:38
6.	"Don't Need Love"	4:16
7.	"Burn"	5:43
8.	"Soul Revival"	4:32
9.	"Fire Without a Flame"	4:20
10.	"Get Ya Love"	3:29
11.	"Never Last"	3:33
12.	"Thang II"	6:14

== Chart performance ==
=== Weekly charts ===
Chart (1989)	Peak position
Australian Albums Chart	2
New Zealand Album Chart	25
Canadian Album Chart	75

=== Year-end charts ===
Chart (1989)	Position
ARIA Albums Chart	7

== Certifications ==
Region	Certification	Certified units/sales
Australia (ARIA)	2× Platinum	140,000^{^}
^{^} Shipments figures based on certification alone.

== Awards ==
Year	Category	Nominated work	Result
ARIA Music Awards of 1989	Breakthrough Single	"Don't Need Love"	Nominated
ARIA Music Awards of 1989	Best New Talent	Johnny Diesel & the Injectors	Won
ARIA Music Awards of 1990	Breakthrough album	Johnny Diesel & the Injectors	Nominated
ARIA Music Awards of 1990	Highest Selling Album	Johnny Diesel & the Injectors	Won
ARIA Music Awards of 1990	Best Group	Johnny Diesel & the Injectors	Nominated

== Singles ==
- "Don't Need Love" (1988) (AUS: No. 10)
- "Soul Revival" (1989) (AUS: No. 9)
- "Cry in Shame" (1989) (AUS: No. 10)
- "Lookin' for Love" (1989) (AUS: No. 28)
- "Since I Fell for You" (1989) (AUS: No. 79)

== Personnel ==
- Produced, recorded, engineered and mixed by Terry Manning
- Mastered by: Bob Ludwig at Masterdisk.
- Tracks arranged by: Terry Manning, Brent Eccles and JD & Injectors.
- Photography: Brian Hagiwara, David Heffernan.
- Art Direction: Peter Corriston.
- Thanks: Among others thanks to Chris Collie, Jamie Manifis, George Dahlstrom, Jim & Jane Barnes, Brian Lizotte.
- Musicians: Johnny Diesel (vocals, guitar); Bernie Bremond (saxes, backing vocals); Yak Sherrit (drums); Johnny 'Tatt' Dalzell (bass) and the 'F A Horns' (Johnny Diesel, Bernie Bremond & Terry Manning)

== VHS ==
Johnny Diesel & the Injectors

Video by Johnny Diesel & the Injectors
- Released: 1989
- Genre: Rock music
- Label: Chrysalis Records, Festival Video
- Producer: Paul Elliott, Kimble Rendall

Johnny Diesel & the Injectors chronology
Johnny Diesel & the Injectors (1989)	Hepfidelity and More (1993)

"Johnny Diesel & the Injectors" is a VHS released by Chrysalis Records, Festival Video in 1989, featuring 4 video clips from Johnny Diesel and the Injectors.

== Track listing ==
1. Lookin' for Love
2. Soul Revival
3. Cry in Shame
4. Don't Need Love
5. Thang I
