= Jordan Luck =

Jordan Luck MNZM
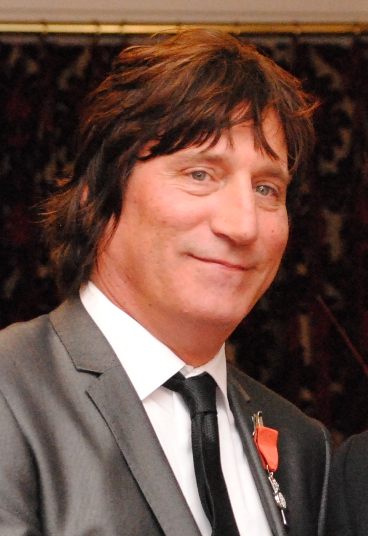
- Luck in 2012

Background information
- Birth name: Jordan Luck
- Born: 15 October 1961 (age 63); Vanderhoof, British Columbia, Canada
- Origin: Geraldine, Canterbury, New Zealand
- Genres: Rock
- Instrument(s): Vocals, guitar
- Labels: Mushroom Records
- Website: www.jordanluckband.com www.jordanluck.co.nz

Jordan William Hunter Luck MNZM (born 15 October 1961) is the former lead singer and songwriter of the New Zealand rock band the Exponents. He was born in Vanderhoof in the province of British Columbia, Canada. His family moved to Tokarahi (near Oamaru) and later moved to Geraldine where he grew up. He attended University of Canterbury and College House. He is now in a band called The Jordan Luck Band.

At the 2007 APRA Silver Scroll Awards on 18 September, Luck was named as the first inductee to the New Zealand Music Hall of Fame. He was appointed a Member of the New Zealand Order of Merit for services to music in the 2012 Queen's Birthday and Diamond Jubilee Honours.

In 2019, Luck would cover Al Park's "I Walked Away" for the covers collection Better Already - The Songs Of Al Park. Park, a singer-songwriter sometimes credited as the father figure for the 'Lyttelton Sound' and the first guy to bring punk music to Otautahi, had featured in the video for "Victoria", a top ten hit in 1982 for Luck and his band The Dance Exponents.

Also in 2019, Luck would tour New Zealand with The Jordan Luck Band, starting off at Peach & Porker in Te Awamutu on 23 February 2019 and ending the tour in Christchurch on 22 June 2019.

== Discography ==
=== Singles ===
Year	Single	Peak chart positions	Album
Year	Single	NZ	Album
2004	"Here They Come, There They Go"	—	Non-album singles
2009	"How Is the Air Up There"	—	Non-album singles
2010	"Johnnie's Coin"	—	Non-album singles
"—" denotes releases that did not chart or were not released in that country.

== See also ==
- The Exponents

== Awards ==
=== Aotearoa Music Awards ===
The Aotearoa Music Awards (previously known as New Zealand Music Awards (NZMA)) are an annual awards night celebrating excellence in New Zealand music and have been presented annually since 1965.

Year	Nominee / work	Award	Result	Ref.
2007	Jordan Luck	New Zealand Music Hall of Fame	inductee	
2015	Jordan Luck (as part of The Exponents)	New Zealand Music Hall of Fame	inductee	
