= List of Australian Idol finalists =

Australian Idol is an Australian talent reality television series that first aired in 2003. As of December 2008, there have been six seasons. During every season, the final round of competition features twelve singers, except for season three when it had thirteen finalists. A total of 73 contestants have reached the finals of their season. The show's age requirements only allow people to enter if they are between 16 and 29 years of age. Out of the 73 contestants listed, 19 of them were under the age of 20, including two winners and two runners-up. Season one winner Guy Sebastian currently holds the record for the highest-selling Australian Idol album, with more than four hundred thousand copies sold in Australia.

== Contestants ==
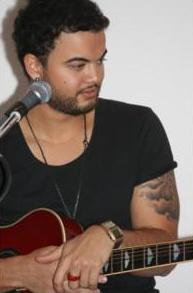
Guy Sebastian, season one winner

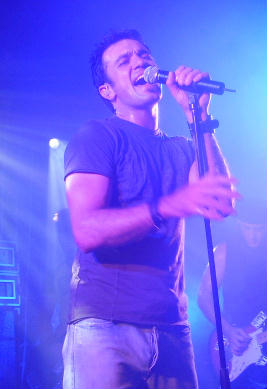
Shannon Noll, season one runner-up

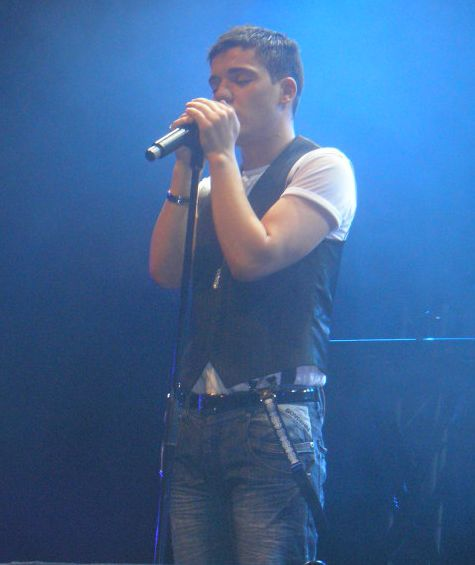
Anthony Callea, season two runner-up

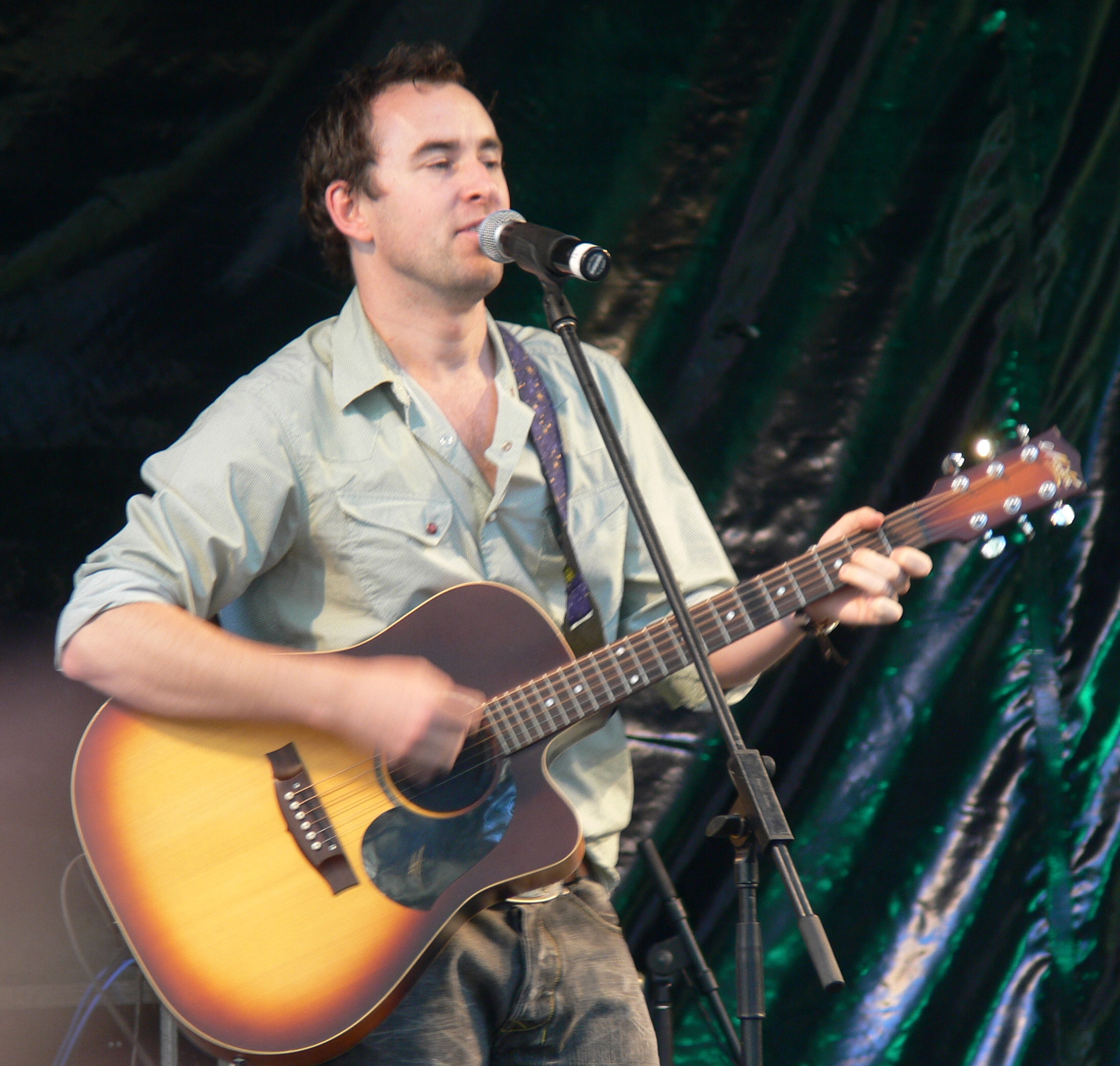
Damien Leith, season four winner

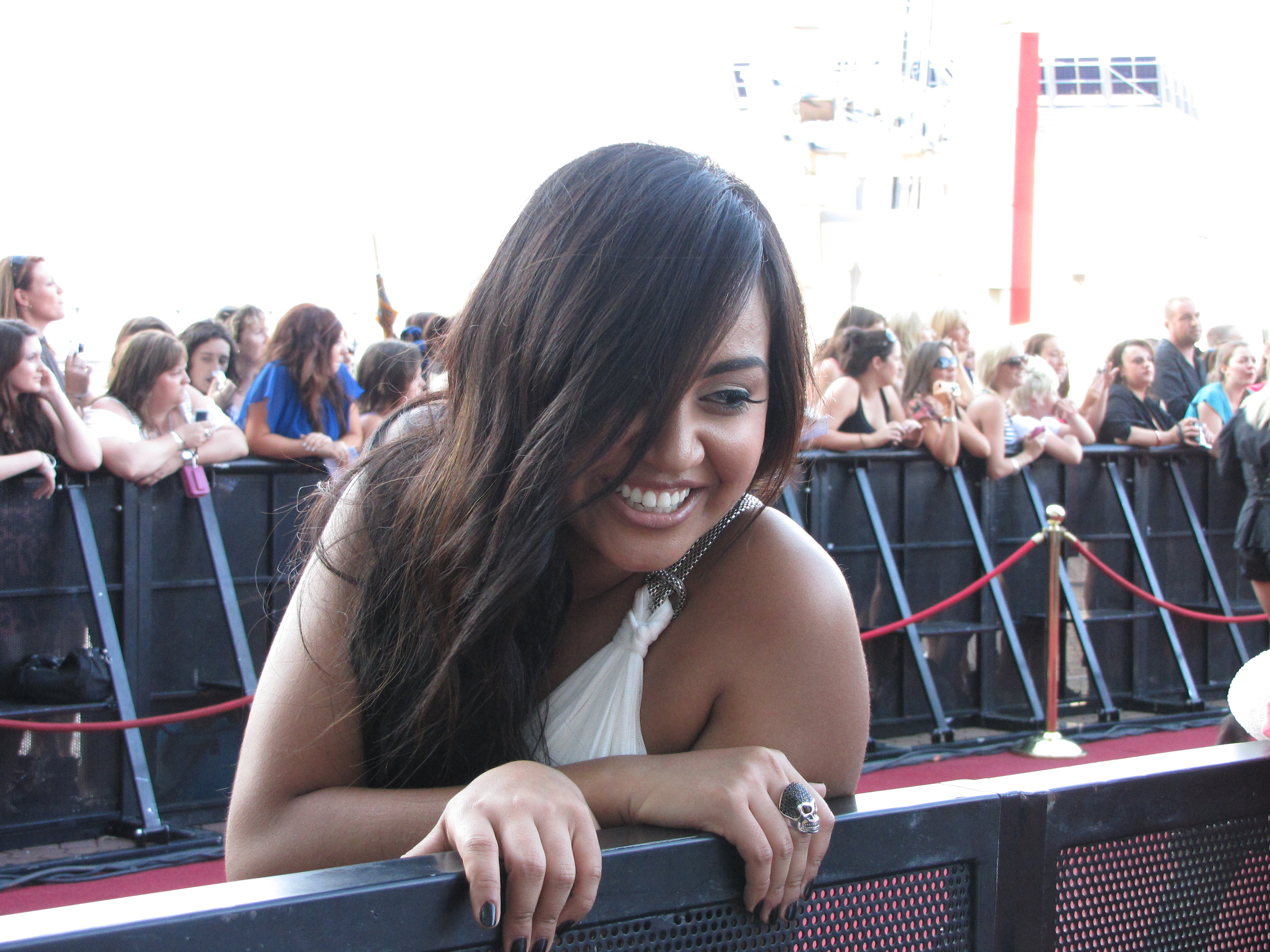
Jessica Mauboy, season four runner-up

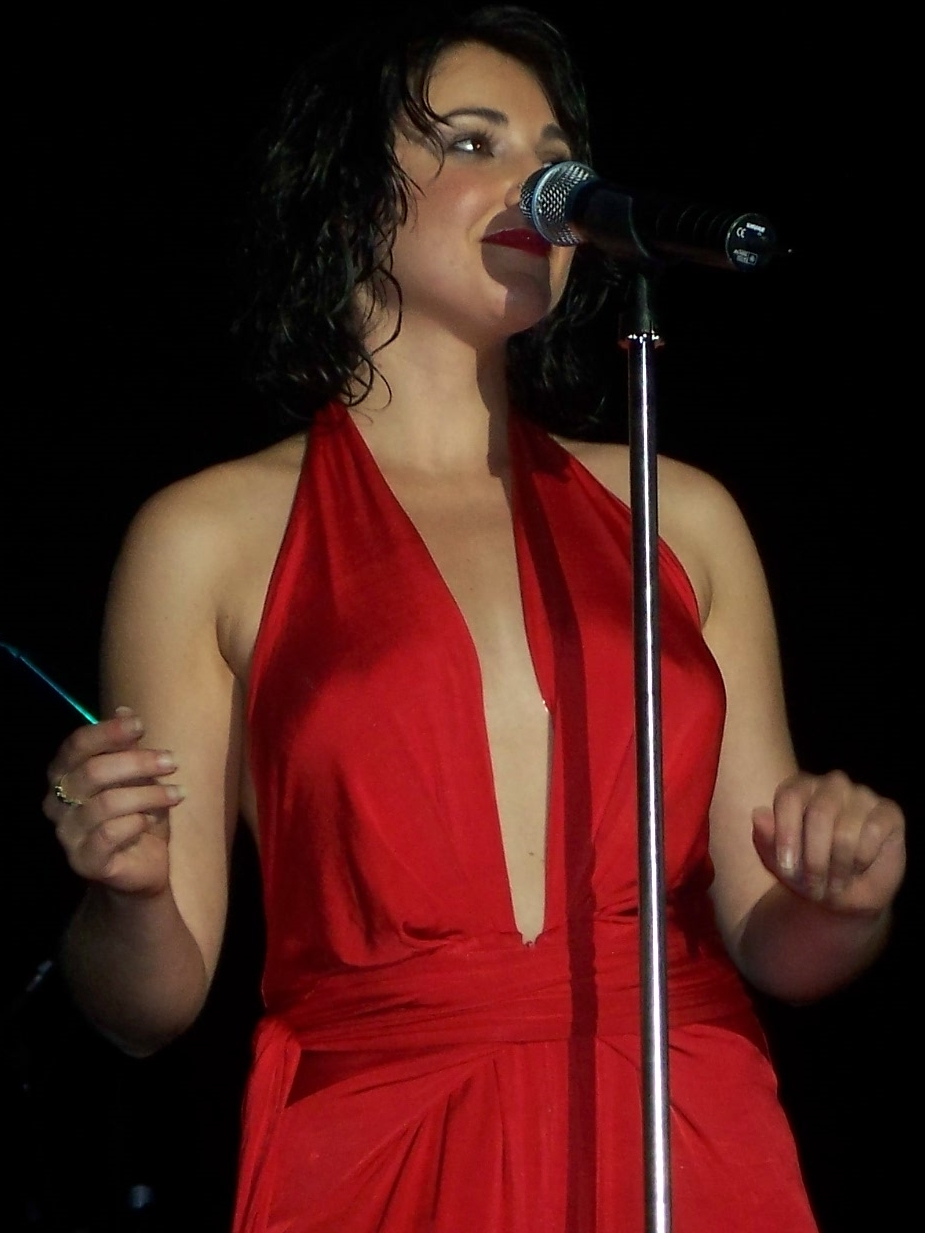
Natalie Gauci, season five winner

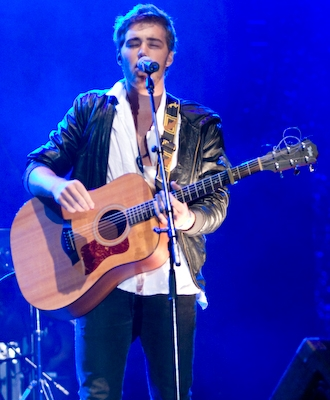
Matt Corby, season five runner-up

Name	Age	Hometown	Season	Finished
Mathew Chadwick	20	Gold Coast, Queensland	1	12th
Peter Ryan	27	Tabulam, New South Wales	1	11th
Cle Wootton	22	Perth, Western Australia	1	10th
Lauren Buckley	17	East Gosford, New South Wales	1	9th
Kelly Cavuoto	22	Adelaide, South Australia	1	8th
Rebekah LaVauney	25	Liverpool, New South Wales	1	7th
Levi Kereama	19	Brisbane, Queensland	1	6th
Rob Mills	21	Melbourne, Victoria	1	6th
Paulini Curuenavuli	20	Wiley Park, New South Wales	1	4th
Cosima De Vito	26	Perth, Western Australia	1	3rd
Shannon Noll	27	Condobolin, New South Wales	1	Runner-up
Guy Sebastian	21	Paradise, South Australia	1	Winner
Angie Narayan	26	Brisbane, Queensland	2	12th
Dan O'Connor	25	Mount Annan, New South Wales	2	11th
Amali Ward	16	New Town, Tasmania	2	10th
Emelia Rusciano	25	Adelaide, South Australia	2	9th
Daniel Belle	21	Sydney, New South Wales	2	8th
Ricki-Lee Coulter	18	Gold Coast, Queensland	2	7th
Marty Worrall	26	Kerang, Victoria	2	6th
Chanel Cole	26	Bega, New South Wales	2	5th
Hayley Jensen	21	Canberra, Australian Capital Territory	2	4th
Courtney Murphy	24	Perth, Western Australia	2	3rd
Anthony Callea	21	Point Cook, Victoria	2	Runner-up
Casey Donovan	16	Bankstown, New South Wales	2	Winner
Tarni Stephens	27	Brisbane, Queensland	3	13th
Chris Luder	26	Brisbane, Queensland	3	12th
Natalie Zahra	17	Innisfail, Queensland	3	11th
Laura Gissara	21	Melbourne, Victoria	3	10th
Roxane LeBrasse	22	Sydney, New South Wales	3	9th
Milly Edwards	17	Mount Eliza, Victoria	3	8th
James Kannis	19	Sydney, New South Wales	3	7th
Anne Robertson	22	Sydney, New South Wales	3	6th
Daniel Spillane	25	Brisbane, Queensland	3	5th
Dan England	21	Queensland	3	4th
Lee Harding	22	Frankston North, Victoria	3	3rd
Emily Williams	20	Inala, Queensland	3	Runner-up
Kate DeAraugo	19	Bendigo, Victoria	3	Winner
Joseph Gatehau	18	Ashcroft, New South Wales	4	12th
Reigan Derry	17	Maida Vale, Western Australia	4	11th
Klancie Keough	24	Richmond, Queensland	4	10th
Guy Mutton	29	Gold Coast, Queensland	4	9th
Lavina Williams	27	New South Wales	4	8th
Bobby Flynn	25	Byron Bay, New South Wales	4	7th
Lisa Mitchell	16	Albury, New South Wales	4	6th
Ricky Muscat	22	Werribee, Victoria	4	5th
Chris Murphy	30	Perth, Western Australia	4	4th
Dean Geyer	20	Melbourne, Victoria	4	3rd
Jessica Mauboy	17	Darwin, Northern Territory	4	Runner-up
Damien Leith	30	County Kildare, Ireland	4	Winner
Holly Weinert	20	Mildura, Victoria	5	12th
Brianna Carpenter	21	Brisbane, Queensland	5	11th
Lana Krost	17	Perth, Western Australia	5	10th
Mark Da Costa	28	Petersham, New South Wales	5	9th
Jacob Butler	25	Mount Gambier, South Australia	5	8th
Ben McKenzie	16	Gosford, New South Wales	5	7th
Daniel Mifsud	23	Mortdale, New South Wales	5	6th
Tarisai Vushe	20	Sydney, New South Wales	5	5th
Marty Simpson	20	Forresters Beach, New South Wales	5	4th
Carl Riseley	24	Sydney, New South Wales	5	3rd
Matt Corby	16	Cronulla, New South Wales	5	Runner-up
Natalie Gauci	25	Melbourne, Victoria	5	Winner
Jonny Taylor	22	Perth, Western Australia	6	12th
Brooke Addamo	17	Werribee, Victoria	6	11th
Tom Williams	16	Adelaide, South Australia	6	10th
Madam Parker	23	Beverly Hills, New South Wales	6	9th
Thanh Bui	25	Abbotsford, Victoria	6	8th
Sophie Paterson	23	London, England	6	7th
Roshani Priddis	21	Ashfield, New South Wales	6	6th
Chrislyn Hamilton	17	Scarborough, Queensland	6	6th
Teale Jakubenko	22	Yatala, Queensland	6	4th
Mark Spano	26	Brighton, Victoria	6	3rd
Luke Dickens	25	Young, New South Wales	6	Runner-up
Wes Carr	26	Bondi, New South Wales	6	Winner
Ashleigh Toole	18	Central Coast, New South Wales	7	12th
Casey Barnes	30	Tasmania	7	11th
Sabrina Batshon	24	Rhodes, Sydney	7	10th
Tim Johnston	28	Newcastle, New South Wales	7	9th
Scott Newnham	20	Melbourne, Victoria	7	8th
Kim Cooper	21	Melbourne, Victoria	7	7th
Kate Cook	26	Lowood, Queensland	7	6th
Toby Moulton	30	Melrose, South Australia	7	5th
Nathan Brake	17	Guildford, Sydney	7	4th
James Johnston	19	Wingham, Sydney	7	3rd
Hayley Warner	18	Sydney, New South Wales	7	Runner-Up
Stan Walker	19	Melbourne, Victoria	7	Winner

== Notes ==
- Contestant's age at the time the season's final round began.
