= Australian Idol 3: The Final 13 – Australian Made: The Hits =

Australian Made: The Hits

Compilation album by Australian Idol 3: The Final 13
- Released: 1 October 2005 (Australia)
- Recorded: September 2005
- Genre: Pop
- Length: 48:44
- Label: Sony BMG Australia
- Producer: John Foreman

Australian Made: The Hits is the compilation cast album of cover songs released by the finalists of Australian Idol 2005. The songs were chosen based on the first Australian Idol 3 liveshow theme on 11 September 2005, which was Australian Hits, there was also a corresponding DVD featuring the performances from this particular show.

== Track listing ==
1. "Ready" by the Australian Idol 3 Top 13
2. "Cry in Shame" by Dan England
3. "I Don't Want To Be With Nobody But You" by Anne Robertson
4. "The Day You Went Away" by James Kannis
5. "Absolutely Everybody" by Natalie Zahra
6. "Throw Your Arms Around Me" by Chris Luder
7. "Please Don't Ask Me" by Kate DeAraugo
8. "Holy Grail" by Lee Harding
9. "Playing To Win" by Milly Edwards
10. "Buses & Trains" by Emily Williams
11. "Forever Now" by Roxane LeBrasse
12. "Tucker's Daughter" by Daniel Spillane
13. "You're My World" by Laura Gissara
14. "(Baby I've Got You) On My Mind" by Tarni Stephens
