= Tom Jay Williams =

Australian Entertainer

- Born: Thomas James Williams; May 14, 1992 (age 34)
- Origin: Adelaide, South Australia
- Genre: Pop
- Occupations: Singer; songwriter; model
- Instruments: Vocals, Guitar, Piano, Drums
- Years active: 2008-present
- Formerly of: At Sunset, Darling Brando

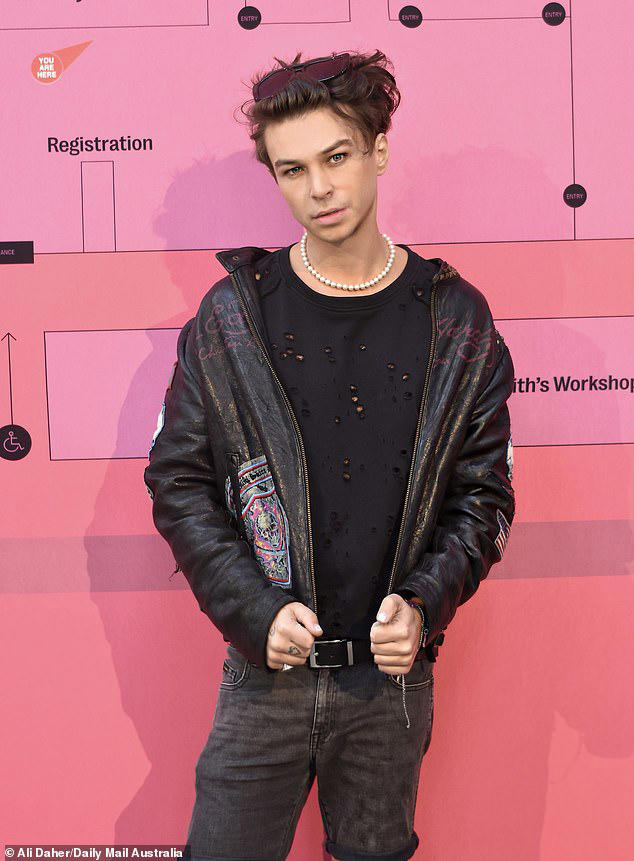
Williams at Australian Fashion Week in 2023

Tom Jay Williams (born 14 May 1992) is an Australian pop singer and songwriter who was the youngest finalist on the Australian Idol series placing 10th on Season 6 in 2008 at 16 years old. He subsequently signed to Sony Music Australia and released his debut single LOL in March 2010. His 2017 single 'Closure' led to a partnership with YouTube and reached number 2 on Japanese music charts.

== 2014–2016: At Sunset ==
In March 2014, Williams joined the band At Sunset who were signed to Warner Music Australia the following year. At Sunset were best known as the winners of the Nova FM Fresh Discovery and MTV (Australia and New Zealand) Brand New competitions, catching the attention of Zendaya and singer/songwriter Ed Sheeran who personally mentored the band in 2015. During his time with At Sunset, Williams co-wrote the bands successful 2015 single 'Every Little Thing' with Nash Overstreet from American pop rock band Hot Chelle Rae, the band were also interviewed by Ryan Seacrest and were selected by KIIS Sydney to support Miley Cyrus on the iHeart Music festival prior to its cancellation.

Williams and At Sunset also toured with Nickelodeon Slimefest alongside Boyce Avenue and The Veronicas in September 2015, were the support act for American artists R5 and Jack & Jack in January 2016, supported UK band The Vamps on the Wake Up World Tour at Allphones Arena in Sydney in January 2016 and were invited by Boyce Avenue to support them again at their arena show at the Smart Araneta Coliseum in The Philippines in February 2016.

Williams and At Sunset were ambassadors for the Australian Football League team Port Adelaide Football Club

== 2016–2018: "Closure" & "Figure It Out" ==
On 30 June 2016, At Sunset announced on their social media accounts that they were disbanding and Williams pursued a successful solo career with the release of his debut single 'Closure' in March 2017. Written by Fredrik Häggstam, who co-wrote the song 'Paris' by American electronic music duo The Chainsmokers and Gavin Jones who wrote for Little Mix on their 'DNA' album. 'Closure' reached number 1 on the New Zealand and number 2 on the Japan streaming charts and was playlisted on the BBC. Williams released his second single 'Figure It Out' in November 2017. He debuted the single live at the Music Matters Festival in Singapore in 2017 and was invited by YouTube's Global Head of Music, Lyor Cohen to join him onstage in a live mentoring session where a world first partnership between YouTube and Williams was announced. Williams also performed with William Singe and Wesley Stromberg on the 'Cool For Summer' Festival in April 2017 with Pnau drummer Commandeur and was selected as a brand ambassador alongside Kelly Rowland for the launch of Coca-Cola Zero Sugar in Australia in June 2017.

== 2018–2021: Darling Brando ==
Williams is a founding member of Australian boyband Darling Brando, formed in 2018. Darling Brando made their worldwide debut at the Music Matters Festival in Singapore in 2018 and signed to Sony Music Australia in August 2019. They released their debut single 'Beat Up Guitar' in March 2019, co-written by Swedish songwriter and producer Johan Gustafsson (The Pussycat Dolls, Icona Pop) alongside Joleen Belle (Kelly Clarkson, Selena Gomez) and Sebastian Lundberg (Lupe Fiasco, Dami Im, Samantha Jade). 'Beat Up Guitar' debuted at number 2 on the Shazam discovery charts and peaked at number 36 on the Spotify Australia Viral 50 chart. Darling Brando were attempting a new world record of performing 100 shows in 30 days in early 2020 which earned them the title of 'Australia's Hardest Working Boy Band', however had to cancel their attempt after only 80 shows left as Australia was locked down during the COVID-19 Pandemic. Darling Brando released their second single 'Nightlights' in August 2020, co-written by Jimmy Robbins (Day + Shay, Florida Georgia Line, Keith Urban) as well as Nash Overstreet and Ryan Follese from American pop-rock band Hot Chelle Rae whom Williams has collaborated with throughout his music career. Darling Brando released their third single 'Wild Eyes' in October 2020 which was co-written by Norwegian singer Ruben and Swedish songwriter David Björk (Armin van Buuren, HRVY). Williams departed Darling Brando in February 2021.

== Concert tours ==
=== Headlining ===
- At Sunset 'Kiss Me' Tour Australia (2016)
- At Sunset 'Kiss Me' Tour Philippines (2016)

=== Supporting (With At Sunset) ===
- Jack & Jack and R5 (band) co-headlining Australia Tour (2016)
- The Vamps (British band) 'Wake Up' Tour (2016)
- Boyce Avenue 'Be Somebody' Tour (2016)

=== Supporting (solo career) ===
- 5 Seconds of Summer Twenty Twelve Tour (2012)

=== Joining ===
- Nickelodeon 'SlimeFest' (2015)
- Amplify Live Australian Tour (2017)

== Awards and nominations ==
Year	Award	Category	Nominee	Result
2015	Nova FM Fresh Discovery	Fresh Discovery	At Sunset	Won
2015	MTV Australia & New Zealand Brand New	Brand New	At Sunset	Won
2016	Nickelodeon Kids' Choice Awards	Favourite Pop Sensation AU/NZ	At Sunset	Nominated
