= Jay Dee Springbett =

British Australian record executive

- Born: 27 June 1975; Britain
- Died: 30 June 2011; Woolloomooloo, New South Wales, Australia
- Occupations: Record executive, television personality
- Known for: Judge on Australian Idol (2009 Executive Sony Music Entertainment

Jay Dee Springbett (1975 – 30 June 2011), was a British Australian record executive who appeared as a judge on the singing competition Australian Idol during the show's seventh season in 2009. Springbett was one of three judges, along with Ian Dickson and Marcia Hines.

== Career ==
Springbett, an executive with Sony Music Entertainment in Britain, moved from his native United Kingdom to Australia in 2004. He worked in the artists and repertoire department at Sony Music Australia. He helped launch or manage the careers of well-known Sony artists and pop singers, including Jessica Mauboy and Human Nature.

== Personal life ==
In January 2010, Springbett split from his fiancée with whom he had two daughters.

On 30 June 2011, Springbett was found dead at his apartment in Woolloomooloo in non-suspicious circumstances.
