= Australian Idol season 6 =

Australian Idol
- Season 6
- Hosted by: Andrew G James Mathison; Ricki-Lee Coulter
- Judges: Ian Dickson; Marcia Hines; Kyle Sandilands
- Winner: Wes Carr
- Runner-up: Luke Dickens
- Finals venue: Fox Studios, Sydney; Sydney Opera House (Grand Final)

Release
- Original network: Network Ten
- Original release: 24 August – 23 November 2008

Season chronology
- ← Previous; Season 5 Next → Season 7

Finalists (in alphabetical order and elimination date)
Wes Carr	Winner
Luke Dickens	23 November
Mark Spano	17 November
Teale Jakubenko	10 November
Chrislyn Hamilton	3 November
Roshani Priddis	27 October
Sophie Paterson	20 October
Thanh Bui	13 October
Madam Parker	6 October
Tom Williams	29 September
Brooke Addamo	22 September
Jonny Taylor	15 September

The sixth season of Australian Idol premiered on Sunday, 24 August 2008, on Network Ten. The season finale aired live on Sunday, 23 November 2008. The winner was Wes Carr with Luke Dickens as runner-up.

== Changes to Format ==
Kyle Sandilands, Ian Dickson, and Marcia Hines returned as judges, however long term judge Mark Holden left to pursue other interests. Andrew G was temporarily absent while he prepared for his wedding and Ricki-Lee Coulter is acting as a new back-stage host. The London auditions featured guest judges Tina Arena and Darren Hayes.

Also for the second time on an Idol contest, the format for eliminations in the Top 12 round will be different. In the new result nights, the bottom 3 of the week will be announced first and the voting line will be opened again for viewers to vote for their favourite in the bottom 3. Music Idol, the Bulgarian version of Idol, were the first to use this new format in their second season. New Zealand Idol season 3 used a similar format for the second week of the finals, but dropped it afterwards.

== Process ==
=== Auditions ===
==== Locations ====
Auditions were held in the following cities:

Town/City	State	Arena/Area	Date
Newcastle	New South Wales	Broadmeadow Racecourse	6 April
Darwin	Northern Territory	Crowne Plaza	13 April
Cairns	Queensland	Shangri-La Hotel	15 April
London, England		The Cumberland Hotel	19 April
Albury	New South Wales	Albury Convention Centre	20 April
Hobart	Tasmania	Hobart Function & Conference Centre	23 April
Brisbane	Queensland	South Bank Piazza	24 & 25 April
Albany	Western Australia	Albany Town Hall	1 May
Perth	Western Australia	Ascot Racecourse	4 May
Melbourne	Victoria	Melbourne Park Function Centre	10 & 11 May
Adelaide	South Australia	Adelaide Entertainment Centre (first tier); Barossa Valley (second tier)	18 May
Sydney	New South Wales	Australian Technology Park Performance Centre	1 & 2 June

Registrations were also conducted online, although not mandatory, allowed users to enter a draw of $2,000.

=== Semi-finals ===
From 1 to 4 September the Semi-final rounds aired on television, allowing viewers to vote. The Wildcard Performance Show was held on Sunday, 7 September, with results on 8 September.

List of the semi-finalists below.

Females	Males
Brooke Addamo	Thanh Bui
Nicole Banks	Wes Carr
Natalie Colavito	Luke Dickens
Amanda Grafanakis*	Teale Jakubenko
Chrislyn Hamilton	Matthew Parsons
Madam Parker	Irae Schwenke
Sophie Paterson	Mark Spano
Roshani Priddis	James Spargo
Brooke Schubert	Mitchell Steele
Kayla Vanzetta	Jonny Taylor
Brooke Wilkie	Tom Williams

* Grafanakis later auditioned for the second series of The X Factor (Australia), where she finished in 9th place.

== Weekly Song Themes ==
Week	Theme	Mentor/guest judge
Top 12	Idols' Idols	None
Top 11	'80s Music	Cyndi Lauper
Top 10	Aussie Hits	Darren Hayes
Top 9	ABBA	None
Top 8	Rock	Tim Farriss and Kirk Pengilly
Top 7	Motown	Guy Sebastian
Top 6	Rolling Stones	None
Top 5	Michael Jackson	Jermaine Jackson
Top 4	American Hits	Chris Isaak
Top 3	Idols' Choice	Tina Arena

== Top 12 Finalists ==
=== Wesley Carr ===
Wes Carr is a 26-year-old from Bondi, New South Wales. Born in Adelaide, South Australia, Wes Carr moved to Bondi as a 15-year-old. Before he auditioned for Australian Idol, Wes Carr performed and had regular resident gigs around Sydney. On 23 November 2008, Wes Carr was announced the winner of Australian Idol 2008.

1. "Times Like These" by Foo Fighters – (Top 24)
2. "Beautiful Day" by U2 – (Top 12)
3. "Dancing in the Dark" by Bruce Springsteen – (Top 11)
4. "Friday on My Mind" by The Easybeats – (Top 10)
5. "Fernando" by ABBA – (Top 9)
6. "Desire" by U2 – (Top 8)
7. "If I Were A Carpenter" by The Four Tops – (Top 7)
8. "Jumpin' Jack Flash" by The Rolling Stones – (Top 6)
9. "Black or White" by Michael Jackson TOUCHDOWN! (from Marcia Hines and Jermaine Jackson) – (Top 5)
10. "When You Were Young" by The Killers – (Top 4)
11. "What a Wonderful World" by Louis Armstrong – (Top 4) Bottom 2
12. "Easy" by Faith No More – (Top 3)
13. "Get Back" by The Beatles TOUCHDOWN! (from Dicko) and TV Throw (from Kyle Sandilands) – (Top 3)
14. "White Noise" by The Living End – (Top 2)
15. "You" by Wes Carr – (Top 2)

Preceded by Natalie Gauci	Australian Idol winner 2008	Succeeded by Stan Walker

=== Luke Dickens ===
Luke Dickens (born 7 June 1982) is from Young, New South Wales. Before he auditioned, Luke Dickens was a sheep shearer and had taught himself how to play the guitar. He was announced runner-up to Wes Carr on 23 November 2008. Luke has gone on to release 3 albums (Underdog (2010), Devil in the Wind (2011) & After The Rain (2019)). After The Rain topped the ARIA Australian Country Artist Album Chart and also hit No. 5 on the ARIA Country Album Chart and Top 50 all genres.

1. "Mustang Sally" by Mack Rice – (Top 24)
2. "Angels" by Robbie Williams – (Wildcard)
3. "Feelin' Alright" by Joe Cocker – (Top 12)
4. "Jack and Diane" by John Mellencamp – (Top 11)
5. "Flame Trees" by Cold Chisel – (Top 10)
6. "Knowing Me, Knowing You" by ABBA – (Top 9)
7. "Are You Gonna Go My Way" by Lenny Kravitz – (Top 8)
8. "My Girl" by Temptations – (Top 7)
9. "Honky Tonk Woman" by The Rolling Stones – (Top 6) Bottom 2
10. "The Way You Make Me Feel" by Michael Jackson – (Top 5)
11. "With Arms Wide Open" by Creed – (Top 4)
12. "One of These Nights" by The Eagles – (Top 4)
13. "Stuck in the Middle" by Stealers Wheel – (Top 3)
14. "I Guess That's Why They Call It the Blues" by Elton John – (Top 3)
15. "Turn the Page" by Bob Seger – (Top 2)
16. "When We Hear Hallelujah" – by Luke Dickens – (Top 2)

=== Mark Spano ===
Mark Spano is a 26-year-old from Brighton, Victoria. He is of Italian Heritage. Mark Spano fronted band The Need for seven years, but had to stop after losing his voice due to polyp in his vocal cords. During his 2-year recovery, Mark Spano worked as a labourer until he auditioned for Australian Idol. Spano was eliminated during the Top 3 results night.

1. "Come Said The Boy" by Mondo Rock – (Top 24)
2. "Never Tear Us Apart" by INXS – (Top 12)
3. "I Want to Know What Love Is" by Foreigner – (Top 11)
4. "Age of Reason" by John Farnham – (Top 10)
5. "Waterloo" by ABBA – (Top 9)
6. "Sex on Fire" by The Kings of Leon – (Top 8)
7. "You Keep Me Hangin' On" by The Supremes – (Top 7) Bottom 2
8. "Angie" by The Rolling Stones – (Top 6) TOUCHDOWN! (from Dicko)
9. "Bad" by Michael Jackson – (Top 5) Bottom 2
10. "Baby Did a Bad, Bad Thing" by Chris Isaak – (Top 4)
11. "Everybody Hurts" by R.E.M. – (Top 4)
12. "Bad Day" by Fuel – (Top 3)
13. "Smooth" by Carlos Santana & Rob Thomas – (Top 3) Eliminated 17 November 2008

=== Teale Jakubenko ===
Teale Jakubenko is a 22-year-old from Yatala, Queensland. Born in Gold Coast, Queensland, Teale Jakubenko recently toured with renowned Australian singer Wendy Matthews. Jakubenko was eliminated during the Top 4 results night. Teale was placed in the Bottom 3 six times including elimination and therefore has been placed there the most times out of any contestant in the history of Australian Idol. And has a son and a daughter. His son is so crackable

1. "Running" by Evermore – (Top 24)
2. "Walk Away Renée" by Rick Price – (Top 12) Bottom 2
3. "I Still Haven't Found What I'm Looking For" by U2 – (Top 11)
4. "Black Fingernails, Red Wine" by Eskimo Joe – (Top 10) Bottom 2
5. "Thank You for the Music" by ABBA – (Top 9)
6. "Slide" by Goo Goo Dolls – (Top 8) Bottom 3
7. "Ain't No Mountain High Enough" by Marvin Gaye & Tammi Terrell – (Top 7) Bottom 3
8. "You Can't Always Get What You Want" by The Rolling Stones – (Top 6) Bottom 3
9. "Billie Jean" by Michael Jackson – (Top 5)
10. "No Such Thing" by John Mayer – (Top 4)
11. "What Goes Around.../...Comes Around" by Justin Timberlake – (Top 4) Eliminated 10 November 2008

=== Chrislyn Hamilton ===
Chrislyn Hamilton is a 17-year-old from Scarborough, Queensland. Before her audition, Chrislyn Hamilton was in high school and was the lead singer in her school band, picked up a leading role in her school musical and performed in a gospel rock choir group every week. Hamilton was eliminated during the Top 5 results night, and for the first time, the contest was left with four male finalists.

1. "Proud Mary" by Tina Turner – (Top 24)
2. "Think" by Aretha Franklin – (Top 12) TOUCHDOWN! (from Kyle Sandilands)
3. "True Colours" by Cyndi Lauper – (Top 11)
4. "Chains" by Tina Arena – (Top 10)
5. "Mamma Mia" by ABBA – (Top 9) Bottom 3
6. "Don't Speak" by No Doubt – (Top 8)
7. "Get Ready" by Temptations – (Top 7) TOUCHDOWN! (from Guy Sebastian)
8. "Get off of My Cloud" by The Rolling Stones – (Top 6)
9. "Thriller" by Michael Jackson – (Top 5) Eliminated 3 November 2008

=== Roshani Priddis ===
Roshani Priddis (born August 1987) is a 21-year-old from Ashfield, New South Wales, although she grew up in Tamworth, New South Wales. Born in Sri Lanka, Priddis moved to Australia as a 6-week-old when she was adopted by an Australian family. Priddis was eliminated during the Top 6 results night.

1. "Knock on Wood" by Eddie Floyd – (Top 24)
2. "If I Ain't Got You" by Alicia Keys – (Wildcard)
3. "Tell Me 'bout It" by Joss Stone – (Top 12)
4. "What's Love Got To Do With It" by Tina Turner – (Top 11)
5. "Heading in the Right Direction" by Renée Geyer – (Top 10)
6. "Money, Money, Money" by ABBA – (Top 9) Bottom 2
7. "The Pretender" by Foo Fighters – (Top 8)
8. "Reflections" by Diana Ross & The Supremes – (Top 7)
9. "Wild Horses" by The Rolling Stones – (Top 6) Eliminated 27 October 2008

=== Sophie Paterson ===
Sophie Paterson is a 23-year-old from London, United Kingdom. Originally from Maryknoll, Victoria, Paterson moved to England to pursue a music career. Before she auditioned, Sophie Paterson worked as a bar manager and performed regularly. She was eliminated during the Top 7 results night.

1. "(I Can't Get No) Satisfaction" by The Rolling Stones – (Top 24)
2. "I'm Yours" by Jason Mraz – (Wildcard)
3. "Mr. Jones" by Counting Crows – (Top 12) Bottom 3
4. "Sweet Dreams (Are Made of This)" by Eurythmics – (Top 11) Bottom 2
5. "Don't Hold Back" by The Potbelleez – (Top 10)
6. "Gimme! Gimme! Gimme!" by ABBA – (Top 9)
7. "Ana's Song (Open Fire)" by Silverchair – (Top 8) Bottom 2
8. "Papa Was A Rolling Stone" by Temptations – (Top 7) Eliminated 20 October 2008

=== Thanh Bùi ===
Thanh Bùi is a 25-year-old from Abbotsford, Victoria. Born in Adelaide, South Australia, to Vietnamese parents, he moved to Melbourne as a 7-year-old. He was educated at Melbourne High School, graduating in 2000. Thanh Bui was part of the boy-band North who toured around Malaysia and split up in 2006. Aside of Australian Idol he is the director and vocal coach at International Artist Academy. Bui was eliminated during the Top 8 Results Night.

1. "One" by U2 – (Top 24)
2. "This Love" by Maroon 5 – (Top 12)
3. "Every Breath You Take" by The Police – (Top 11) Bottom 3
4. "You're the Voice" by John Farnham – (Top 10)
5. "The Winner Takes It All" by ABBA – (Top 9) TOUCHDOWN! (from Marcia Hines)
6. "Shadow of the Day" by Linkin Park – (Top 8) – Eliminated 13 October 2008

=== Madam Parker ===
Madam Parker is a 23-year-old who lives with her family in Beverly Hills, New South Wales. Originally from New Zealand, Parker moved to Australia in order to make a better future for her son and pursue her musical dreams. Parker is of Māori and West African descent. Parker was eliminated during the Top 9 Results Night. In April 2010, it was announced that Madam will be a new member of the Young Divas group, replacing former member, Emily Williams.

1. "No One" by Alicia Keys – (Top 24)
2. "Closer" by Ne-Yo – (Top 12)
3. "Upside Down" by Diana Ross – (Top 11)
4. "Hook Me Up" by The Veronicas – (Top 10) Bottom 3
5. "Dancing Queen" by ABBA – (Top 9) – Eliminated 6 October 2008

=== Tom Williams ===
Thomas Jay Williams (born 14 May 1992) is a 25-year-old from Melbourne, Victoria. At 15-months-old, Williams had a heart condition. Before the auditions, he attended high school. Williams was eliminated during the top 10 results night. He joined a band from Melbourne named At Sunset (later Lynk) in March 2014, but he left to focus on solo music in June 2016.

1. "You Raise Me Up" by Josh Groban – (Top 24)
2. "I Don't Want to Miss a Thing" by Aerosmith – (Top 12)
3. "Uptown Girl" by Billy Joel – (Top 11)
4. "Light Surrounding You" by Evermore – (Top 10) – Eliminated 29 September 2008

=== Brooke Addamo ===
Brooke Addamo is a 25-year-old from Werribee, Victoria. Addamo takes professional vocal coaching and won Teen Idol in 2007. She was eliminated during the Top 11 Results Night. She has now released an E.P. with Wunderkind (Warner Music) under her moniker, Owl Eyes, which is in stores now.

1. "Foolish Games" by Jewel – (Top 24)
2. "These Words" by Natasha Bedingfield – (Top 12)
3. "Bette Davis Eyes" by Kim Carnes – (Top 11) – Eliminated 22 September 2008

=== Jonny Taylor ===
Jonny Taylor is a 22-year-old from Perth, Western Australia. Since 2006, Taylor has been determined to make his life count after a serious motorcycle accident almost took his life. He was eliminated during the Top 12 Results Night.

1. "Hound Dog" by Elvis Presley – (Top 24)
2. "Let Her Cry" by Hootie & the Blowfish – (Wildcard)
3. "Better Man" by Pearl Jam – (Top 12) – Eliminated 15 September 2008

== Elimination chart ==
Elimination chart key
Females	Males	Top 24	Top 12	Wild Card	Winner

Elimination chart
Did Not Perform	Safe	Safe First	Safe Last	Eliminated

Stage:		Semi-finals				Wild Card	Finals										
Week:		1/9	2/9	3/9	4/9	7/9	14/9	21/9	28/9	5/10	12/10	19/10	26/10	2/11	9/11	16/11	23/11
Place	Contestant	Result															
1	Wes Carr	Top 12													Bottom 2		Winner
2	Luke Dickens		Wild Card			Top 12							Bottom 2				Runner-up
3	Mark Spano			Top 12								Bottom 2		Bottom 2		Elim	
4	Teale Jakubenko			Top 12			Bottom 2		Bottom 2		Bottom 2	Bottom 3	Bottom 3		Elim		
5	Chrislyn Hamilton	Top 12								Bottom 3				Elim			
6	Roshani Priddis			Wild Card		Top 12				Bottom 3			Elim				
7	Sophie Paterson			Wild Card		Top 12	Bottom 3	Bottom 2			Bottom 3	Elim					
8	Thanh Bui		Top 12					Bottom 3			Elim						
9	Madam Parker				Top 12				Bottom 3	Elim							
10	Tom Williams		Top 12						Elim								
11	Brooke Addamo				Top 12			Elim									
12	Jonny Taylor				Wild Card	Top 12	Elim										
Wild Card	Amanda Grafanakis		Wild Card			Elim											
Wild Card	Savannah Rakz	Wild Card				Elim											
Wild Card	James Spargo			Wild Card		Elim											
Wild Card	Charley Yates				Wild Card	Elim											
Semi-final 4	Irae Schwenke				Elim												
Semi-final 4	Cat Badasio				Elim												
Semi-final 3	Andy Davis			Elim													
Semi-final 2	Madison Peter		Elim														
Semi-final 2	Brooke Kcleve		Elim														
Semi-final 1	Jaden Dowd	Elim															
Semi-final 1	Andy Davis	Elim															
Semi-final 1	Olly Corpe	Elim															

== Result Night Performances ==
=== Guest Performances ===
Week	Performer(s)	Title
Top 24	Axle Whitehead	"I Don't Do Surprises"
Top 12	Jordin Sparks	"No Air"
Top 11	Cyndi Lauper	"Time After Time"
Top 10	Vanessa Amorosi	"The Simple Things (Something Emotional)"
Top 9	Metro Station	"Shake It"
Top 8	Jessica Mauboy	"Running Back"
Top 7	Gabriella Cilmi	"Save the Lies"
Top 6	Chris Brown	"Forever"
Top 5	Pink	"Sober"
Top 4	Chris Isaak	"Wicked Game"

== Grand Finale ==
The Grand Finale occurred on 23 November at the Sydney Opera House. The 2008 finale unlike previous finales was held outside the Sydney Opera House rather than inside the building.

=== Grand Finale performances ===
#	Singer/Group	Song
Top 12		"Can You Feel It", originally by The Jacksons
1	Wes Carr and Luke Dickens	"Times Like These", originally by Foo Fighters
2	Mark Spano	"Sex on Fire", originally by Kings of Leon
Special Performance		"Burn" by Jessica Mauboy
3	Top 12 Male Finalists	"Higher Ground", originally by Stevie Wonder
4	Top 12 Female Finalists	"I'm Every Woman", originally by Chaka Khan
Special Performance		"Rattlin' Bones" by Kasey Chambers and Shane Nicholson
Top 12		"Viva la Vida", originally by Coldplay
5	Wes Carr	"Black or White", originally by Michael Jackson
6	Luke Dickens	"Feelin' Alright", originally by Traffic
7	Wes Carr	"You"

== Ratings ==
Episode		Airdate	Viewers (in millions)	Nightly Rank	Weekly Rank
1	"Auditions"	24 August 2008	1.400	#4	#15
2	"Auditions"	25 August 2008	1.257	#8	#26
3	"Auditions"	26 August 2008	1.098	No. 13	No. 37
4	"Auditions"	27 August 2008	1.240	No. 10	No. 28
5	"Auditions"	28 August 2008	1.148	No. 8	No. 34
6	"Auditions"	29 August 2008	1.033	No. 7	No. 45
7	"Top 100"	31 August 2008	1.310	No. 7	No. 22
8	"Semi-finals"	1 September 2008	1.204	No. 9	No. 32
9	"Semi-finals"	2 September 2008	1.257	No. 9	No. 28
10	"Semi-finals"	3 September 2008	1.231	No. 10	No. 29
11	"Semi-finals"	4 September 2008	1.150	No. 7	No. 36
12	"Wildcard Performances"	7 September 2008	1.193	No. 8	No. 28
13	"Wildcard Results"	8 September 2008	1.100	No. 13	No. 41
14	"Top 12 Performances"	14 September 2008	1.224	No. 7	No. 24
15	"Top 12 Results"	15 September 2008	1.027	No. 12	No. 47
16	"Top 11 Performances"	21 September 2008	1.342	No. 2	No. 18
17	"Top 11 Results"	22 September 2008	1.140	No. 10	No. 38
18	"Top 10 Performances"	28 September 2008	1.202	No. 5	No. 22
19	"Top 10 Results"	29 September 2008	0.897	No. 15	No. 58
20	"Top 9 Performances"	5 October 2008	1.215	No. 7	No. 25
21	"Top 9 Results"	6 October 2008	0.971	No. 13	No. 41
22	"Top 8 Performances"	12 October 2008	1.194	No. 8	No. 28
23	"Top 8 Results"	13 October 2008	0.789	No. 22	No. 80
24	"Top 7 Performances"	19 October 2008	1.138	No. 6	No. 29
25	"Top 7 Results"	20 October 2008	0.909	No. 16	No. 57
26	"Top 6 Performances"	26 October 2008	1.168	No. 6	No. 24
27	"Top 6 Results"	27 October 2008	0.903	No. 17	No. 52
28	"Top 5 Performances"	2 November 2008	1.230	No. 3	No. 18
29	"Top 5 Results"	3 November 2008	0.982	No. 12	No. 42
30	"Top 4 Performances"	9 November 2008	1.127	No. 6	No. 26
31	"Top 4 Results"	10 November 2008	0.882	No. 16	No. 59
32	"Top 3 Performances"	16 November 2008	1.270	No. 4	No. 15
33	"Top 3 Results"	17 November 2008	1.079	No. 12	No. 33
34	"Grand Finale"	23 November 2008	1.600	No. 1	No. 2
