= Australian Idol =

Australian singing competition TV series

- Created by: Simon Fuller
- Presented by: Osher Günsberg (formerly Andrew Günsberg); James Mathison; Ricki-Lee Coulter; Scott Tweedie
- Judges: Ian Dickson; Marcia Hines; Mark Holden; Kyle Sandilands; Jay Dee Springbett; Meghan Trainor; Amy Shark; Harry Connick Jr.; Morgan Evans
- Country of origin: Australia
- Original language: English
- No. of seasons: 10
- No. of episodes: 309

Production
- Running time: 1–2 hours (includes commercials)
- Production companies: FremantleMedia Australia (seasons 1–7); 19 Entertainment (seasons 1–7); Eureka Productions (season 8–)

Original release
- Network: Network 10
- Release: 27 July 2003 – 22 November 2009
- Network: Seven Network
- Release: 30 January 2023 – present

Australian Idol is an Australian singing competition, which began its first season in July 2003 and ended its initial run in November 2009. As part of the Idol franchise, Australian Idol originated from the reality program Pop Idol, which was created by British entertainment executive Simon Fuller. Australian Idol was televised on Network Ten for its first seven series and was broadcast on the Southern Cross Austereo Radio Network between 2005 and 2007. The series was revived on the Seven Network in 2023.

== Finalists ==
The following table lists the finalists by finishing position for each season. Contestants eliminated in the same round share a position.

Australian Idol finalists by season
Position	2003	2004	2005	2006	2007	2008	2009	2023	2024	2025	2026
Winner	Guy Sebastian	Casey Donovan	Kate DeAraugo	Damien Leith	Natalie Gauci	Wes Carr	Stan Walker	Royston Sagigi-Baira	Dylan Wright	Marshall Hamburger	Kesha Oayda
Runner-up	Shannon Noll	Anthony Callea	Emily Williams	Jessica Mauboy	Matt Corby	Luke Dickens	Hayley Warner	Phoebe Stewart	Amy Reeves	Iilysh Retallick	Harlan Goode
3rd	Cosima De Vito	Courtney Murphy	Lee Harding	Dean Geyer	Carl Riseley	Mark Spano	James Johnston	Josh Hannan	Denvah Baker-Moller	Gisella Colletti	Kalani Artis
4th	Paulini Curuenavuli	Hayley Jensen	Dan England	Chris Murphy	Marty Simpson	Teale Jakubenko	Nathan Brake	Amali Dimond; Ben Sheehy; Anya Hynninen	Trent Richardson; Issac McCallum; Ivana Ilic	William Le Brun; Jaymon Bob; Jake Whittaker	Tre Samuels; Jacinta Guirguis; John Standley
5th	Rob Mills	Chanel Cole	Daniel Spillane	Ricky Muscat	Tarisai Vushe	Chrislyn Hamilton	Toby Moulton	—	—	—	—
6th	Levi Kereama^{†}	Marty Worrall	Anne Robertson	Lisa Mitchell	Daniel Mifsud	Roshani Priddis	Kate Cook	—	—	—	—
7th	Rebekah LaVauney; Kelly Cavuoto	Ricki-Lee Coulter	James Kannis	Bobby Flynn	Ben McKenzie	Sophie Paterson	Kim Cooper	Angelina Curtis; Noora H	Drea Onamade; Kiani Smith	Emma Jones; John Van Beek	Charlie Moon; Simela Petridis
8th	—	Daniel Belle	Milly Edwards	Lavina Williams	Jacob Butler	Thanh Bui	Scott Newnham	—	—	—	—
9th	Lauren Buckley; Cle Wootton	Emelia Rusciano	Roxane LeBrasse	Guy "Mutto" Mutton	Mark Da Costa	Madam Parker	Jared Gundy	Sash Seabourne; Harry Hayden	Tyler Hammill; TJ Zimba	Bony Onynango; Hannah Waddell	Wanwue Tarpeh; Harry Lamb
10th	—	Amali Ward	Laura Gissara	Klancie Keough	Lana Krost	Tom Williams	Sabrina Batshon	—	—	—	—
11th	Peter Ryan; Mathew Chadwick	Dan O'Connor	Natalie Zahra	Reigan Derry	Brianna Carpenter	Brooke Addamo	Casey Barnes	Maya Weiss; Jasey Fox	Ripley Alexander; Imogen Spendlove	Aaliyah Duchesne; Mzuki	Sophie Poidevin; Lily-Grace Grant
12th	—	Angeline Narayan	Chris Luder; Tarni Stephens	Joseph Gatehau	Holly Weinert	Jonny Taylor	Ashleigh Toole	—	—	—	—
13th	—	—	—	—	—	—	—	—	—	—	—

== Series overview ==
Season	Episodes	Originally Aired		Result		Judges	Hosts	Network
Season	Episodes	Premiere	Finale	Winner	Runner-up	Judges	Hosts	Network
One	44	27 July 2003	19 November 2003	Guy Sebastian	Shannon Noll	Mark Holden; Marcia Hines; Ian Dickson	Andrew G; James Mathison	Ten
Two	37	13 July 2004	21 November 2004	Casey Donovan	Anthony Callea	Mark Holden; Marcia Hines; Ian Dickson	Andrew G; James Mathison	Ten
Three	53	26 July 2005	21 November 2005	Kate DeAraugo	Emily Williams	Mark Holden; Marcia Hines; Kyle Sandilands	Andrew G; James Mathison	Ten
Four	36	6 August 2006	26 November 2006	Damien Leith	Jessica Mauboy	Mark Holden; Marcia Hines; Kyle Sandilands	Andrew G; James Mathison	Ten
Five	37	5 August 2007	25 November 2007	Natalie Gauci	Matt Corby	Mark Holden; Marcia Hines; Ian Dickson; Kyle Sandilands	Andrew G; James Mathison	Ten
Six	35	24 August 2008	23 November 2008	Wes Carr	Luke Dickens	Marcia Hines; Ian Dickson; Kyle Sandilands	Andrew G; James Mathison; Ricki-Lee Coulter	Ten
Seven	20	9 August 2009	22 November 2009	Stan Walker	Hayley Warner	Kyle Sandilands; Jay Dee Springbett; Marcia Hines; Ian Dickson	Andrew G; Ricki-Lee Coulter	Ten
Eight	21	30 January 2023	26 March 2023	Royston Sagigi-Baira	Phoebe Stewart	Harry Connick Jr.; Meghan Trainor; Amy Shark; Kyle Sandilands	Ricki-Lee Coulter; Scott Tweedie	Seven
Nine	26	29 January 2024	25 March 2024	Dylan Wright	Amy Reeves	Kyle Sandilands; Marcia Hines; Amy Shark	Ricki-Lee Coulter; Scott Tweedie	Seven
Ten	26	2 February 2025	7 April 2025	Marshall Hamburger	Iilysh Retallick	Kyle Sandilands; Marcia Hines; Amy Shark	Ricki-Lee Coulter; Scott Tweedie	Seven
Eleven	27	2 February 2026	14 April 2026	Kesha Oayda	Harlan Goode	Kyle Sandilands; Marcia Hines; Amy Shark	Ricki-Lee Coulter; Scott Tweedie	Seven
Twelve	TBD	2027	2027	TBD	TBD	Marcia Hines; Amy Shark; Morgan Evans	Ricki-Lee Coulter; Scott Tweedie	Seven

== Judges and hosts ==
The following tables distinguish the programme's current and former presenters and judges. Morgan Evans has been announced as a judge for the upcoming 2027 season.

=== Current judges ===
Judge	Seasons
Marcia Hines	1–7, 9–present
Amy Shark	8–present

=== Incoming judges ===
Judge	First scheduled season
Morgan Evans	12 (2027)

=== Former judges ===
Judge	Seasons
Mark Holden	1–5
Ian Dickson	1–2, 5–7
Kyle Sandilands	3–6, 7 (auditions), 8–11
Jay Dee Springbett	7 (live shows)
Meghan Trainor	8
Harry Connick Jr.	8

=== Current hosts ===
Host	Seasons	Notes
Ricki-Lee Coulter	7–present	Backstage presenter in season 6; contestant in season 2
Scott Tweedie	8–present	Co-host of the revived series

=== Former hosts ===
Host	Seasons
Andrew G (Osher Günsberg)	1–7
James Mathison	1–6

=== Judges and hosts by season ===
Cast member	Season											
Cast member	1 (2003)	2 (2004)	3 (2005)	4 (2006)	5 (2007)	6 (2008)	7 (2009)	8 (2023)	9 (2024)	10 (2025)	11 (2026)	12 (2027)
Judge
Marcia Hines	Main							Guest	Main			
Mark Holden	Main											
Ian Dickson	Main				Main							
Kyle Sandilands			Main				Auditions	Main				
Jay Dee Springbett							Live shows					
Amy Shark								Main				
Meghan Trainor								Main				
Harry Connick Jr								Main				
Morgan Evans												Main
Host
Andrew G	Main											
James Mathison	Main											
Ricki-Lee Coulter		Contestant				Backstage	Main					
Scott Tweedie								Main				

== History ==
Australian Idol sought to discover the most commercial young singer in Australia through a series of nationwide auditions. The outcomes of the later stages of this competition were determined by public voting. It was the first show to use this system of voting in Australia. The original judging panel featured Mark Holden, Marcia Hines and Ian 'Dicko' Dickson. In 2005, this was changed as Dickson was replaced by Kyle Sandilands.

In 2007, Dickson again returned to the program, when Holden left at the end of the season. In 2009, Sandilands was replaced by Jay Dee Springbett.

=== Cancellation ===
Network Ten made the decision to "rest" the program for 2010 after poor ratings in 2009. No further comment was formally made regarding the future of Australian Idol on Network Ten until early 2013, following the network's acquisition of rights to the American series, when program chief Beverley McGarvey hinted it may return. However, later that same year, a Ten spokesperson confirmed that it would not be returning.

=== Revival ===
On 21 October 2020, Seven Network announced at their annual upfronts that they would be reviving the series, originally slated for 2022.

On 28 September 2022, Seven announced that Ricki-Lee Coulter and Scott Tweedie would be the new hosts, with the judging panel consisting of former American Idol judge Harry Connick Jr., former Australian Idol judge Kyle Sandilands, Amy Shark and Meghan Trainor. Original judge Marcia Hines appeared as a guest judge. The revival premiered on 30 January 2023.

In July 2023, it was officially revealed that the show had been renewed by Seven Network for a ninth season, set to premiere in 2024. It was later revealed that Coulter and Tweedie would return as hosts, and that Sandilands and Shark will be returning to their judging positions. However, Connick Jr. and Trainor will not be returning, with Trainor leaving due to family reasons. Original judge Marcia Hines will return as a main judge. Seven officially confirmed the 2024 judges at their upfronts in October 2023. In November 2024, the series was renewed for a tenth season by Seven with Sandilands, Hines and Shark returning as judges with Coulter & Tweedie returning as hosts. On March 29, 2025, it was confirmed during a live show of the 2025 season, that the show would be renewed for an eleventh season in 2026. Sandilands, Hines and Shark returned as judges with Coulter & Tweedie returning as hosts. At the end of July 2026, Sandilands announced he would not be returning as judge in 2027. In August 2026, Morgan Evans was announced as his replacement. Hines and Shark will return as judges with Coulter & Tweedie returning as hosts.

== Format ==
=== Auditions ===
Auditions were held in major cities around Australia to find each season's contestants. Any contestant who got a "yes" from a majority of judges was put through to the top 100 in Sydney. The TV episodes showed the most interesting auditions, which generally meant the worst and the best.

- In Seasons 1, 3, 4, 6 and 7, auditions were held in Sydney, Melbourne, Perth, Brisbane and Adelaide.
- In Season 5 auditions were also held in Darwin.
- In Season 2 in addition to the above cities, auditions were also held in Tamworth, Canberra and Hobart.

=== Top 100 ===
Singers who progress from the auditions go to Sydney, in a stage which was sometimes called the Top 100 or Top 50 (season 8). Over a few days, these contestants are narrowed down to the semi-finalists.

=== Semi-finals ===
Over different seasons, the number of semi-finalists varied between 24 and 40, with between 8 and 10 contestants. For the first seven seasons, each semi-final was spread over two nights. On the first night, each semi-finalist sang a song, and was critiqued by each judge. Then over the next day, the public voted (by phone or SMS). The second night was results night, and the top 2 or 3 went through to the top 12. There was also included a "wild card" semi-final, to give some contestants a second chance to make the top 12.

For seasons 1 to 3, each semi-final took a week, with performances on Sunday night and results on Monday night. For seasons 4 onwards, the semi-finals were all in a single week, because there was greater viewer interest in the finals than the semi-finals.

The formats for the different seasons were:

Season 1 had 5 semi-finals of 8 contestants each. The top 2 in each semi-final made the top 12. A wild card round decided 2 more finalists (it turned out to be 3 after one contestant withdrew) - one judges' choice, two by public vote.

Seasons 2 and 3 had 3 semi-finals of 10 contestants each, with the top 3 in each semi-final making the top 12. Then a further 3 were progressed from the wild card round (2 by judges' choice, 1 by public vote). (The wild card episode in the 3rd season had a little twist, when the judges announced a third person, namely, Roxanne Lebrasse, who also had the 2nd highest number of votes, would be included in the finals, making it a Top 13.)

Seasons 4-7 had 4 semi-finals of 6 contestants each, with the top 2 in each semi-final making the top 12. Then a further 4 made the Top 12 from the wild card round. Seasons 4 and 5 had same gender semi-finals, while Season 6 had 3 males and 3 females in each semi-final. For the wild card show, Seasons 4 and 6 selected 3 by judges' choice and 1 by public vote; Season 5 selected 2 by judges' choice and 2 by public vote;.

Season 8 had 3 semi-finals of 8 contestants each, with the judges putting 4 from each through to the top 12, on the same night. There was no public voting and no wild card round.

Seasons 9-11 had 3 semi-finals of 8 contestants each, with the judges putting 4 from each through to the top 12, on the same night. There was no public voting and no wild card round.

For the first five seasons, contestants who made the semi-finals in previous seasons were not eligible to audition. From the 2008 season onwards, only Top 12 contestants from previous seasons were ineligible.

=== Finals (Top 12) ===
In the Season 1 to 7 finals, one contestant was eliminated per week. (With the exception of Season 1, which eliminated 2 in the first 3 weeks of the finals, and Season 3, which eliminated 2 in the first week of finals due to having a final 13).

For Season 8 onwards, two contestants were eliminated in the first three weeks (Final 12, Final 10 and Final 8), and three were eliminated in Final 6 week, leaving three to go to the Grand Finale.

Each week, contestants chose a song to a weekly theme on the Sunday night. (As the number of contestants got smaller, they sang two or three songs each). As in the semi-finals, each performance was critiqued by the judges, and then there was (approximately) 24 hours of voting by phone or SMS, before the results were announced on the Monday night. The eliminated competitor(s) then presented a final song – usually the number they sang the previous night. In Season 8, each of the bottom 4 performed on elimination night, after voting had closed but before the results were announced.

==== Grand Finale ====
The final results night, the Grand Finale, was held at the Sydney Opera House during seasons 1 to 7. It usually featured fireworks and an outdoor concert with many past Idol stars and other Australian musicians. It had been the highest rating episode of each season. The top 12 were celebrated and at the end of the night the winner was announced. Seasons 1–5 were held inside Sydney Opera House on the concert hall stage. For seasons 6 and 7, the finale was held on a stage erected on the Opera House forecourt. The Opera House has not been used in the reboot seasons (8 onwards).

After the first two seasons, the top 12 and top 10 went on a national tour. There were no tours for later seasons. However, there was a "Winner's Journey Tour" involving the winner with some guest performances from the Top 12 for seasons 4 and 5.

=== Touchdowns ===
A "touchdown" was awarded by judge Mark Holden when, in his own opinion, a contestant's performance was particularly good. Holden awarded his first ever "touchdown" to Cosima De Vito for her rendition of Cold Chisel's "When the War Is Over" in the Top 8 on Australian Made night in Season 1. De Vito also received a touchdown for her rendition of Respect, a classic hit by Aretha Franklin. Season 4 winner, Damien Leith and Season 2 winner, Casey Donovan have the record for the highest number of touchdowns at four apiece. Leith is the only contestant to receive two touchdowns in the same night. Emily Williams, and Matt Corby, runners-up of seasons 3 and 5 respectively both hold the record of receiving the most touchdowns without winning, at three apiece. In 2004, Top 8 contestants choice night, he awarded his only ever 'Grand Royal' Touchdown when Anthony Callea sang his stunning rendition of "The Prayer" which is still regarded as one of the most memorable performances of all seven series. Another two of Holden's most memorable "touchdowns" were awarded to Guy Sebastian for his rendition of "Climb Every Mountain" on the Top 3 show in Season 1 and to Jessica Mauboy for her rendition of Christina Aguilera's "Beautiful" on the Top 10 Number 1 Hits show in Season 4. Holden's final touchdown went to 2007 winner Natalie Gauci in the Top 4 on Big Band night during Season 5.

During Season 6, due to Holden's departure from the judging panel, the other judges awarded "touchdowns" themselves. The first "touchdown" was delivered by Kyle Sandilands to Chrislyn Hamilton on top 12 night. She later received another on Motown night by guest judge and first series winner, Guy Sebastian. Thanh Bui received one from Marcia Hines during ABBA night and Mark Spano was also delivered one by Ian "Dicko" Dickson during Top 6 Rolling Stones night. Eventual winner, Wes Carr was awarded two; one by Hines and guest judge Jermaine Jackson on Michael Jackson night and another on Top 3 night by Dickson.

An alternate version of a "touchdown" was done by Dickson if he believes the performance was extraordinary saying "big ticko from Dicko". This was used in one of Natalie Gauci's performances and a few other performances when Holden was around.

In the first seven seasons, a "touchdown" did not carry any official status. However, in Season 8, during the Top 24 performances, each judge was allowed one "touchdown", which put a singer immediately through to the Top 12.

== Season synopsis ==
=== Season 1 ===
When Network Ten paid $15 million for the first season of Australian Idol they anticipated it to be a critical and financial success like it had been in other countries such as the UK and the USA. When the show aired for the first time in August 2003 it was a ratings bonanza attracting diverse ranges of viewers, from people wanting the crazy auditions to people who wanted to hear great voices. The audition process went through several major cities in Australia including Sydney, Melbourne, Perth, Adelaide and Darwin. Australian Idol became the most popular TV show in the country with more ratings than major events such as the AFL Grand Final. The Grand Final at the Sydney Opera House attracted more than 3 million viewers. It was listed as the ninth highest rating TV show in Australia in the past century in 2007. The eventual winner of the competition was Guy Sebastian with Shannon Noll finishing in 2nd place.

Guy Sebastian has released ten top 10 albums, with eight reaching the top 5, including three No. 1's. His debut album Just As I Am was certified 6× platinum and sold in excess of 480,000 units. Beautiful Life, Closer to the Sun and Like It Like That were all platinum sellers, with The Memphis Album, Twenty Ten reaching 2× platinum. Armageddon has been certified 3× platinum. Madness has been certified gold. His most recent album, T.R.U.T.H. became his third number one album and has been certified platinum. He has also released 23 top 20 singles, with 14 reaching the top ten, including six No. 1's. Sebastian is the only Australian male artist in Australian music history to achieve six No. 1 singles, and is third overall for all Australian acts. His debut single Angels Brought Me Here was the highest selling single in Australia in 2003, reaching 5× platinum certification. It won the 2004 ARIA for Highest Selling Single, and in 2010 ARIA announced it was the highest selling song of the previous decade. "Like It Like That" the title track from his fifth album reached 5× platinum and was the highest selling Australian artist single of 2009. "Who's That Girl", Twenty Ten's only single, reached 6× platinum certification and won the 2011 ARIA Award for Highest Selling Single. "Don't Worry Be Happy, the lead single of Sebastian's seventh album Armageddon reached 5× platinum. The third single "Battle Scars" featuring Lupe Fiasco debuted at No. 1, becoming his sixth No. 1 single in Australia, and achieved 14× platinum certification in 2023. Sebastian has been awarded 82 platinum and seven gold certifications for albums and singles in Australia, the highest for any Australian Idol contestant.

"Angels Brought Me Here" reached No. 1 in Malaysia, Singapore, The Philippines, Indonesia and New Zealand. Sebastian achieved a second No. 1 on the New Zealand Charts with "Who's That Girl", and reached the Top 10 with his debut album and five other singles, and has ten platinum and five gold certifications there. Sebastian is currently the Australian Idol contestant to chart in the US. "Battle Scars" reached No. 71 on the Billboard Hot 100, No. 23 on the Billboard Digital Songs Chart and No. 1 on the Billboard R&B/Hip-hop Digital Song Chart. It spent 20 weeks in the Hot 100 and has been certified triple platinum in the US for sales of three million. "Battle Scars" also reached No. 2 in Norway. In 2015 Sebastian was selected to represent Australia in the Eurovision Song Contest. He finished 5th, and his song "Tonight Again" charted in the top 50 in a number of European countries, including No.6 in Iceland and 16 in Austria. During his career Sebastian has received 32 ARIA Award nominations, winning six of them, including Best Pop Release and Best Live Act.

Shannon Noll has released five top 10 albums. His debut album That's What I'm Talking About gained 5× platinum certification and his second album Lift reached 3× platinum, both debuting at No. 1 on the ARIA charts. His third album, Turn It Up, peaked at No. 3 and achieved platinum certification, His fourth album No Turning Back: The Story So Far reached No. 7, with his fifth album A Million Suns peaking at #8. Neither of these albums have gained certification. Between 2004 and 2007 Noll released ten top 10 singles including three #1's, and he is the only Australian male artist to have achieved 10 consecutive top 10 singles. Since then he has released seven more singles, with two reaching the top 50, the highest one peaking at #26. "What About Me" was the highest selling single in Australia in 2004 and he received ARIA nominations for highest seller for it and his debut album at the 2004 Aria Awards. He also received nominations for best pop release for his second album Lift and a highest selling single nomination for its lead single "Shine" in 2006. "Don't Give Up" a duet with Natalie Bassingthwaighte was nominated for highest selling single at the 2007 ARIA Awards. He has a total of 17 platinum and three gold certifications for albums and singles in Australia. Noll's first single "What About Me" also reached No. 2 in Ireland and No. 10 in New Zealand, with his debut album peaking at No. 31 in NZ.

Paulini who came fourth has released two albums as a solo artist, One Determined Heart which reached No. 1 and gained platinum certification, and Superwoman which peaked at #77. She has also released four top 50 singles including the No. 1 "Angel Eyes", a platinum seller which was nominated for highest selling single at the 2004 ARIA Awards. In 2007, Paulini was nominated for "Urban Music Awards" for "Best R&B Album" & "Best Female Artist" for Superwoman. Paulini was also a member of The Young Divas, who released two Top 10 albums and four Top 50 singles.

The other top 5 contestants in season one were Cosima De Vito who came 3rd, & Rob Mills who finished in 5th place. After Idol it was these five, the Final 5, who were the most successful out of the Top 12. Other Idol contestants from Season 1 to release music were Levi Kereama, Rebekah LaVauney, Peter Ryan and Courtney Act. All of these independent acts achieved limited success.

Date	Bottom Three		
22 September	Mathew Chadwick	Peter Ryan	Kelly Cavuoto
29 September	Cle Wootton	Lauren Buckley	Kelly Cavuoto
6 October	Kelly Cavuoto	Rebekah LaVauney	Levi Kereama
13 October	Levi Kereama	Paulini Curuenavuli	Shannon Noll
	Bottom Two		
20 October	Rob Mills	Cosima De Vito	
27 October	Paulini Curuenavuli	Guy Sebastian	
3 November	Cosima De Vito		
19 November	Shannon Noll	Guy Sebastian	

=== Season 2 ===
As well as the five larger cities, the judges also visited Canberra, Hobart, Darwin and Tamworth this year. Of the twelve finalists, three were from Sydney, two were from Melbourne, and one each from Brisbane, the Gold Coast, Hobart, Perth, Canberra, Adelaide and Bega.

The winner was Casey Donovan. The runners up (in descending order) were Anthony Callea, Courtney Murphy, Hayley Jensen & Chanel Cole. The final two, as well as Ricki-Lee Coulter (7th), were the only contestants from the Top 12 to be signed to a record company. Callea was the highest seller of the three, with his first release "The Prayer" spending five consecutive weeks at No 1, and becoming the second highest selling song in Australia last decade overall and for an Australian artist. Chanel Cole and Daniel Belle teamed up under the name Spook to release an album in October 2005; a bootleg album for Chanel was also released in November 2005. Top 30 contestants Ngaiire Joseph and Marty Worrall each released a single in late 2005, and Hayley Jensen an album in September 2007. Daniel O'Connor, another of the Top 12, gained a role on Neighbours.

The Grand finale of this series remains the highest rated show out of all broadcast over the five seasons.

On a darker note, Telstra, a major sponsor of the series, made an embarrassing error when they issued a series of half-page advertisements in major newspapers congratulating Donovan on her victory, with a reference to her website. However, the address was incorrect, leading to a website about gay porn star Casey Donovan, rather than the singer's. The company issued a prompt apology upon realising their mistake.

After this season, judge Ian Dickson left the series, later to appear in the Seven Network reality TV shows My Restaurant Rules, Dancing with the Stars and most recently, Australian Celebrity Survivor. The 2004 season was also notable for an Asian contestant named "Flynn", who sang the Freestylers song "Push Up" after being found from a terrible audition, in the same vein as William Hung.

Date	Theme	Bottom Three		
6 September	Australian Made	Angeline Narayan	Emelia Rusciano	Amali Ward
13 September	Pop	Dan O'Connor	Hayley Jensen	Marty Worrall
20 September	1960s	Amali Ward (2)	Hayley Jensen (2)	Marty Worrall (2)
27 September	Disco	Emelia Rusciano (2)	Marty Worrall (3)	Casey Donovan
4 October	Contestant's Choice	Daniel Belle	Chanel Cole	Hayley Jensen (3)
11 October	The Beatles	Ricki-Lee Coulter	Chanel Cole (2)	Marty Worrall (4)
18 October	1980s	Marty Worrall (5)	Casey Donovan (2)	Hayley Jensen (4)
25 October	R&B	Chanel Cole (3)	Courtney Murphy	
1 November	Big Band	Hayley Jensen (5)	Casey Donovan (3)	
8 November	1970s	Courtney Murphy (2)		
21 November	Finale	Anthony Callea	Casey Donovan (3)	

=== Season 3 ===
For the first time in 'Australian Idol' history there were 13 finalists. This came about during the Wildcard Verdict show on 5 September 2005. The judges initially chose James Kannis and Emily Williams to go through to the final. This left one spot which was chosen by the Australian public. Out of the remaining contestants the two that received the highest votes were Daniel Spillane and Roxane Lebrasse. With only 1% between them, Dan was announced as the final member of the Top 12. This meant Roxane had missed out yet again. The judges decided however that Roxane was too good to be left out of the Top 12 so they made it a Top 13. The catch was that two contestants were eliminated in the first round of the finals.

On 21 November 2005, the winner was announced and it was Kate DeAraugo. Kate was an outside chance to win throughout the whole season and after the show had ended Kate released a No. 1 single, a platinum selling album and a further Top 10 hit single through Sony BMG. Kate is currently working with all-girl group Young Divas, which is made up of past Idol contestants which include Paulini Curuenavuli, Jessica Mauboy and Emily Williams. Runner up Emily Williams lost by 1% in the closest percentage ever in an Idol finale. She was originally signed to Sony BMG as a solo artist, but the agreement fell through. She is also a member of Young Divas and has had much success with them.

Lee Harding finished in third position and was signed to Sony BMG and released a # 1 single and a platinum selling album. His second single from his debut album proved to be less successful and in mid-2006 Harding was released from his contract with the label. He is currently touring and performing with Bedrock.

Dan England came 4th and didn't score a recording contract with a major label but recorded several independent releases and has toured with Season 2 winner Casey Donovan and Season 1 runner-up Shannon Noll.

Anne Robertson who finished in sixth position was negotiating a deal with Sony BMG, but it was rumoured that Sony BMG was reluctant in signing her as they believed she was too similar to Season 1 contestant Paulini Curuenavuli who had been signed to the label for several years. Other Idol contestants from Season 3 have released numerous independent material and have toured and performed with several bands and music groups.

Although averaging around the 1.5 million viewer mark, ratings were down by up to 40% on average during the third season compared to the first two seasons, which regularly drew more than 2.5 million viewers during the latter half of the competition. This created a serious situation for Ten, which was airing three Australian Idol shows every week at the time, and forced them to give away free commercial airtime to program sponsors expecting higher ratings. Commentators have theorised over the reasons why this has occurred, ranging from the viewing public being tired of the format due to Sandilands replacing the popular Dickson. This caused a major Idol revamp for Season 4 which meant Season 4 being one of the highest rating seasons yet.

Date	Theme	Bottom Three		
12 September	Australian Artists	Tarni Stephens	Chris Luder	Milly Edwards
19 September	1960s	Natalie Zahra	Laura Gissara	James Kannis
26 September	Rock Supergroups	Laura Gissara (2)	James Kannis (2)	Daniel Spillane
3 October	Contestant's Choice	Roxane LeBrasse	Milly Edwards (2)	Daniel Spillane (2)
10 October	Big Band	Milly Edwards (3)	Dan England	James Kannis (3)
17 October	1980's	James Kannis (4)	Emily Williams	Daniel Spillane (3)
24 October	Motown	Anne Robertson	Daniel Spillane (4)	Dan England (2)
31 October	1970's	Daniel Spillane (5)	Lee Harding	
7 November	Elvis Presley	Dan England (3)	Lee Harding (2)	
14 November	Number Ones	Lee Harding (3)		
21 November	Finale	Emily Williams (1)	Kate DeAraugo	

=== Season 4 ===
Changes for the fourth season of Australian Idol included the cancellation of "Inside Idol"; a "streamlined" semi-finals (replaced with a variant of the 12 females, 12 males format popularised by American Idol); and the contestants will be able to bring instruments with them on stage for at least one of the final shows. Also, the fourth season's television promos promised a change in the viewer's role in the show, revealed to be an SMS service called 199-JUDGE which allows viewers to SMS their opinions on the judges' reactions.

Damien Leith was named the winner of Australian Idol 2006 on 26 November, beating Jessica Mauboy for the title. Leith is the fifth most successful Australian Idol contestant behind Guy Sebastian, Shannon Noll, Mauboy and Anthony Callea. He has been awarded 7 platinum and one gold certification and achieved sales of 525,000+. He has the third highest album sales for a contestant. He achieved two No. 1 albums, The Winner's Journey which sold 4× platinum and Where We Land which gained platinum certification. His first single, Night of My Life stayed at No. 1 for four consecutive weeks and was certified platinum after one week of sales. It was the fastest selling debut single for 2006. Leith won 4 ARIA No. 1 Chart Awards, and the 2007 ARIA Award for Highest Selling Album for The Winner's Journey. His third studio album Catch the Wind: Songs of a Generation peaked at No. 2, reaching gold status. His fourth album Remember June released in 2009 peaked at No. 25. In 2010 Leith released a covers album of Roy Orbison songs titled Roy which reached No. 2 and platinum certification. His sixth album Now and Then released in 2012 peaked at #12. He has also released two novels and hosted Network Ten's television series "Saving Kids".

Jessica Mauboy went on to join ex-Idol girl group Young Divas, after member from season 2, Ricki-Lee Coulter, left the group. Mauboy has since gained much success as a solo artist. Her first studio album Been Waiting peaked at No. 11, spent 59 weeks on the charts and achieved 2× platinum status. Mauboy has also enjoyed success with her singles "Running Back" which was certified 2× platinum and second single "Burn" which reached No. 1 and achieved platinum status. Her third single "Been Waiting" peaked at No. 12, fourth single "Because" peaked at No. 9 and her 5th single "Up/Down" peaked at #11. These three singles all reached gold certification. Her second studio album Get 'Em Girls peaked at No. 6 and achieved gold certification. Five top 20 singles were released from the album, including 2 which achieved platinum and 2 double platinum certification. Mauboy has achieved 11 platinum and 5 gold certifications and received 12 ARIA Award nominations, including one win during her career as a recording artist. Third place getter Dean Geyer later released his debut album Rush and top ten single "If You Don't Mean It" and starred on the Australian long-time running soap Neighbours from 2008 to 2009.

Date	Theme	Bottom Three		
11 September	Contestant's Choice	Joseph Gatehau	Lavina Williams	Reigan Derry
18 September	Rock	Reigan Derry (2)	Ricky Muscat	Guy Mutton
25 September	Number Ones	Klancie Keough	Dean Geyer	Lavina Williams (2)
2 October	Birth Year	Guy Mutton (2)	Lisa Mitchell	Jessica Mauboy
9 October	Disco	Lavina Williams (3)	Chris Murphy	Ricky Muscat (2)
16 October	Acoustic	Bobby Flynn	Lisa Mitchell (2)	Ricky Muscat (3)
23 October	Rock Swings	Lisa Mitchell (3)	Dean Geyer (2)	Ricky Muscat (4)
30 October	ARIA Hall of Fame	Ricky Muscat (5)	Dean Geyer (3)	Damien Leith
6 November	Audience Choice	Chris Murphy (2)	Dean Geyer (4)	
13 November	Judge's Choice	Dean Geyer (5)		
26 November	Finale*	Jessica Mauboy	Damien Leith	

=== Season 5 ===
Ian "Dicko" Dickson rejoined the show as one of the judges, along with Mark Holden, Marcia Hines and Kyle Sandilands from 2006. The series was again hosted by Andrew G and James Mathison. The show continued with the format from Season 4 where contestants could use instruments throughout the show and for their audition they could perform original material rather than covering other artist's work.

Natalie Gauci went on to win the series, beating Matt Corby for the title. Natalie released her debut platinum selling album "The Winner's Journey". After the winner's single "Here I Am" debuted at No. 2 on the ARIA Charts, and the album debuted at No. 11. Natalie released her second album in 2012.

Carl Riseley, who finished third in the contest went on to release a swing-style album titled "The Rise", debuting at No. 5 on the ARIA Charts. Carl Riseley's 2nd cd "the stillest hour" was released 24 April 2009 and peaked at NO#1 on the ARIA jazz chart.

Date	Theme	Bottom Three		
9 September	Contestant's Choice	Holly Weinert	Lana Krost	Brianna Carpenter
16 September	Rock	Brianna Carpenter (2)	Marty Simpson	Jacob Butler
23 September	Disco	Lana Krost (2)	Tarisai Vushe	Daniel Mifsud
30 September	Acoustic	Mark Da Costa	Jacob Butler (2)	Daniel Mifsud (2)
7 October	Brit Pop	Jacob Butler (3)	Carl Riseley	Daniel Mifsud (3)
14 October	Birth Year	Ben McKenzie	Matt Corby	Marty Simpson (2)
21 October	Judge's Choice/Contestant's Choice	Daniel Mifsud (4)	Tarisai Vushe (2)	Marty Simpson (3)
28 October	Australian Made	Tarisai Vushe (3)	Natalie Gauci	
4 November	Big Band	Marty Simpson (4)	Carl Riseley (2)	
11 November	Audience Choice/Contestant's Choice	Carl Riseley (3)		
25 November	Finale	Matt Corby (1)	Natalie Gauci (1)	

=== Season 6 ===
Changes to the Australian Idol format for season 6 include judge Mark Holden leaving the show and temporary absence of host Andrew Günsberg, and auditions held for the first time in the United Kingdom. This was also the first season where the Top 4 contestants were all male, and the second time with two male grand finalists, after Season 1 Finale with Guy Sebastian and Shannon Noll. On 23 November, Wes Carr was announced as Australian Idol for 2008, beating Luke Dickens.

Date	Theme	Bottom Three		
14 September	Idols' Idols	Jonny Taylor	Teale Jakubenko	Sophie Paterson
21 September	'80s Music	Brooke Addamo	Sophie Paterson (2)	Thanh Bui
28 September	Aussie Hits	Tom Williams	Teale Jakubenko (2)	Madam Parker
5 October	ABBA	Madam Parker (2)	Chrislyn Hamilton	Roshani Priddis
12 October	Rock	Thanh Bui (2)	Teale Jakubenko (3)	Sophie Paterson (3)
19 October	Motown	Sophie Paterson (4)	Mark Spano	Teale Jakubenko (4)
26 October	The Rolling Stones	Roshani Priddis (2)	Luke Dickens	Teale Jakubenko (5)
2 November	Michael Jackson	Chrislyn Hamilton (2)	Mark Spano (2)	
9 November	American Hits	Teale Jakubenko (6)	Wes Carr	
16 November	Contestants Choice	Mark Spano (3)		
23 November	Finale	Luke Dickens (1)	Wes Carr (1)	

=== Season 7 ===
On 10 November 2008, it was announced that a seventh season of Australian Idol would be produced and aired in late 2009.

James Mathison announced on 31 March 2009 that he was leaving the show after six seasons. Andrew G continued hosting along with Ricki-Lee Coulter who was once again co-host.

On 1 June 2009, musical director John Foreman announced that he was also leaving the show after six seasons. Foreman's right-hand man, David Pritchard-Blunt, was announced as his replacement.

On 3 August, Kyle Sandilands was let go as a judge on Australian Idol, after an on-air radio stunt went wrong. "Australian Idol is very much a family program and its appeal is very much right across the board, and we'd like to think that all families can enjoy the program in front of the TV," Idol Executive David Mott stated on the daily news.

It was announced on 3 August 2009, via a press statement from Network Ten, that Sandilands had been sacked from Australian Idol due to this incident. He was replaced by Jay Dee Springbett, a Sony music executive.

A Network Ten spokesman said of Sandilands' firing:

"Idol has remained a family-focused show, even more so this year with the 6.30 pm Sunday timeslot. His radio persona has taken on a more controversial position ... which is not in the interest of the show."

Of being fired from Australia Idol, Sandilands said in a statement that "I'm disappointed at Channel Ten's decision to remove me from Australian Idol. I have truly loved being a part of the show." Network Ten had held crisis talks with advertisers in the days prior to his firing amid concerns Sandilands would damage their brands. Idol creator Simon Fuller reportedly gave Ten his blessing to fire Sandilands. It was believed Sandilands earned $1 million of his estimated annual $2.8 million income from Idol.

The promotional commercial for the season featured various "Legends". It featured impersonations of Elvis, Madonna, Michael Jackson, the Supremes, Christina Aguilera, and Mariah Carey among others. The Australian Idol hopefuls were featured covering Mariah Carey's "Emotions" as the soundtrack to this commercial.

The 7th season began on 9 August at 6.30 pm. This was the first year that previously rejected contestants could return to audition again. The only ineligible contestants were those who previously made the Top 12/13. Semi-finalists (Top 24/30) had the opportunity to re-audition for the show.

Season 7 was also broadcast in New Zealand, five days after the initial airing in Australia. This marked the return of the show to New Zealand screens after a 4-year absence.

Date	Theme	Bottom Three		
6 September	Contestant's Choice	Ashleigh Toole	Casey Barnes	Tim Johnston
13 September	Rock	Casey Barnes (2)	Sabrina Batshon	Kim Cooper
20 September	Top 10 Hits	Sabrina Batshon (2)	Kim Cooper (2)	Nathan Brake
27 September	'80s	Tim Johnston (2)	Scott Newnham	
4 October	Pink	Scott Newnham (2)	Nathan Brake (2)	
11 October	Big Band	Kim Cooper (3)	Hayley Warner	Kate Cook
18 October	Movie/Theatre	Kate Cook (2)	Stan Walker	
25 October	Contestant's Choice	Toby Moulton^{*}	Nathan Brake (3)	
1 November	Noughties Week	Nathan Brake (4)	Hayley Warner (2)	
8 November	Power Anthems	James Johnston		
15 November	Contestant's Choice & Winner's Single			
22 November	Finale	Hayley Warner (3)	Stan Walker (1)	

^{*} Toby Moulton withdrew hence keeping original eliminee in the competition.

=== Season 8 ===
In November 2020, the Seven Network announced that the show would be revived in early 2022, 13 years since it last aired. However, the revival was delayed to 2023.

On 28 September 2022, Ricki-Lee Coulter and Scott Tweedie were announced as the new hosts. Harry Connick Jr. alongside Amy Shark, Meghan Trainor and Kyle Sandilands were announced as the judging panel for the revived series. On 24 October 2022, Marcia Hines was announced as a guest judge for the season.

Filming for the auditions took place in October 2022 in Sydney, Melbourne, Adelaide, Perth, and the Gold Coast. Filming for the top 50 took place at the Sydney Coliseum Theatre.

Date	Theme	Bottom Four					
27 February	Global Number One Hits	Jasey Fox	Maya Weiss	Ben Sheehy	Noora H		
5 March	Judges' Song Contest	Sash Seabourne	Harry Hayden	Ben Sheehy (2)	Anya Hynninen		
12 March	Heroes & Tributes	Noora H (2)	Angelina Curtis	Amali Dimond	Phoebe Stewart		
19 March*	Viewers' Choice	Anya Hynninen	Ben Sheehy (3)	Amali Dimond	Royston Sagigi-Baira	Phoebe Stewart	Josh Hannan
26 March	Grand Finale	Phoebe Stewart	Royston Sagigi-Baira				

- 19 March – all singers were up for elimination that week.

=== Season 9 ===
In June 2023, Seven confirmed Australian Idol would return for a ninth season in 2024.

Ricki-Lee Coulter and Scott Tweedie were announced as the returning hosts. Harry Connick Jr. and Meghan Trainor will not return as judges. Amy Shark and Kyle Sandilands were confirmed as returning judges from the previous season. It was also confirmed that Marcia Hines will return as a main judge for the series, after being a member of the original seven seasons of the show. On March 24, Guy Sebastian temporarily filled in for Hines, who was sent to hospital after collapsing, but returned for results night.

Filming for the auditions took place in October 2023.

Date	Theme	Bottom Four					
27 February	Party Anthems	Imogen Spendlove	Ripley Alexander	TJ Zimba	Ivana Illic		
5 March	Judges’ Choice	TJ Zimba (2)	Tyler Hammill	Kiani Smith	Ivana Illic (2)		
11 March	Public’s Choice	Drea Onamade	Kiani Smith (2)	Dylan Wright	Denvah Baker-Moller		
18 March*	Viewers' Choice	Ivana Illic (3)	Issac McCallum	Trent Richardson	Dylan Wright (2)	Amy Reeves	Denvah Baker-Moller (2)
25 March	Grand Finale: Aussie Classics	Denvah Baker-Moller (3)	Amy Reeves (2)	Dylan Wright (3)			

- 18 March – all singers were up for elimination that week.

=== Season 10 ===
In November 2024, Seven confirmed Australian Idol would return for a tenth season in 2025.

Ricki-Lee Coulter and Scott Tweedie were announced as the returning hosts with Amy Shark, Kyle Sandilands and Marcia Hines returning as series judges. The season began airing on 2 February 2025.

Date	Theme	Bottom Four			
11 March	Movies	Mzuki	Aaliyah Duchesne	Bony Onynango	Hannah Waddell
18 March	Superstar	Hannah Waddell (2)	Bony Onynango (2)	Jake Whittaker	John Van Beek
24 March	Public's choice	John Van Beek (2)	Emma Jones	Jake Whittaker (2)	Jaymon Bob
31 March	Heroes & Tributes	Jake Whittaker (3)	Jaymon Bob (2)	William Le Brun	-
7 April	Grand Finale: Solos and Celebrity Duets	Gisella Colletti	Iilysh Retallick	Marshall Hamburger	

== Controversies ==
=== Weight comments ===
After a performance, judge Ian "Dicko" Dickson told Paulini Curuenavuli that to wear the dress she had chosen she would need to "shed some pounds". This caused outrage and heated debate. The TV show 20 to 1 named the controversy in an episode of its show titled "Aussie Scandals". Kyle Sandilands claimed that 2005 winner, Kate DeAraugo, had "tuck-shop arms".

=== Hillsong voting claims ===
In October 2007, it was alleged in the media that four of the eight remaining contestants were members of Hillsong Church, raising concerns of vote-stacking by the church congregation. The dispute was mainly put to rest when two of the four, Daniel and Ben, said they did not have any affiliations with the Assemblies of God.

=== Revenue generation ===
In October 2017, reporter Neil Wooldridge stated that although the producers are coy about how much was being made from SMS promotions that "some commentators estimate Telstra and Network Ten, partners in the 'Australian Idol' program, made up to $900,000 profit each episode."

In 2003, it was estimated that viewers cast 20 million votes. At 55 cents for each telephone call or text message, that equated to $11 million. Network Ten paid around $13 million for each season.

== See also ==
- List of Australian music television shows
- Idol (franchise)
- List of Australian television series
- Australian Idol discography
- List of Australian Idol semi finalists
- Music of Australia
- Pop Idol
