= Roxane LeBrasse =

Australian singer (born 1983)

Roxane "Roxy" LeBrasse (born 26 August 1983 in Mauritius) is an Australian singer who was placed ninth place on the third season of Australian Idol. In 2009, Lebrasse (as Roxane) reached number 91 on the ARIA Singles Chart with "Sexy".

== Australian Idol ==
LeBrasse placed ninth on the third season of Australian Idol. She was voted out from the show by the viewers on 3 October 2005. She is the centre of a small amount of controversy for being the 13th member of what has previously been the top twelve contestants on the series.

While she was well liked by both the judges and the voting audience, she never managed to get into the top twelve, first losing out to fellow contestant Laura Gissara, and then losing out to Dan Spillane on the Wildcards show. It was after this that the judges on the show decided to increase the number of contestants in the finals to thirteen, enabling her to compete in the finals.

=== Australian Idol Performances ===
Idol performances
- Sydney Auditions: I Want You Back by The Jackson Five & Saving All My Love For You by Whitney Houston
- Theatre Round Day Two: Pleasure & Pain by Divinyls
- Top 30 (Group 2): Natural Woman by Aretha Franklin
- Wildcards: All By Myself by Celine Dion
- Top 13 (Australian Hits): Forever Now by Cold Chisel
- Top 11 (60's Hits): You Can't Hurry Love by Diana Ross
- Top 10 (Supergroups): We Are The Champions by Queen
- Top 9 (Contestant's Choice): The Voice Within by Christina Aguilera – Eliminated

== Post-Idol career ==
After Australian Idol, LeBrasse continued to work within Australia's recording industry with Jimmy Barnes, Guy Sebastian, Roachford and Jade MacRae, as well as releasing original material with The Rockmelons, Ultraphonic, and Jose Che.

On 18 August 2007, Lebrasse released her debut single "Sexy" under Universal Music Australia, which reached number 91 on the ARIA Singles Chart. However, no more releases were seen from her again, bringing the assumption she had been dropped by the label. In early 2010, LeBrasse began and fronted girl group The Starlettes.

== Discography ==
=== Albums ===
Title	Details
1809	Released: 28 November 2018; Label: The Alternative Entertainment; Formats: Digital download

=== Singles ===
Year	Title	Peak chart positions	Album
Year	Title	AUS	Album
"I Ain't Playin'" (Rockmelons featuring Roxane)	2002	79	Rockies 3
"Sexy"	2007	91	Non-album single
