= Australian Idol season 3 =

Australian Idol
- Season 3
- Hosted by: Andrew G; James Mathison
- Judges: Kyle Sandilands; Marcia Hines; Mark Holden
- Winner: Kate DeAraugo
- Runner-up: Emily Williams
- Finals venue: Sydney Opera House

Release
- Original network: Network Ten
- Original release: 26 July – 21 November 2005

Season chronology
- ← Previous; Season 2 Next → Season 4

Australian Idol season 3 contestants (with dates of elimination)
Contestant	Elimination
Kate DeAraugo	Winner
Emily Williams	Runner-Up
Lee Harding	14 November
Dan England	7 November
Daniel Spillane	31 October
Anne Robertson	24 October
James Kannis	17 October
Milly Edwards	10 October
Roxane LeBrasse	3 October
Laura Gissara	26 September
Natalie Zahra	19 September
Chris Luder	12 September
Tarni Stephens	12 September

The third season of Australian Idol debuted on 26 July 2005. The first of three semi-finals was held on 16 August 2005 with three of the Top 12 contenders announced the following night on 17 August 2005. 2Day FM radio host Kyle Sandilands replaced former judge Ian Dickson.

== Overview ==
For the first time in Australian Idol history, thirteen contestants instead of twelve, made it to the weekly finals rounds. As in past years, the Wildcard show would give a further three contestants a spot in the Top Twelve – two chosen by the judges and one by the Australian public. Following the "second-chance" wildcard performance show the previous night, on 5 September 2005, the judges choices were James Kannis and Emily Williams. The public choice was then revealed to be Daniel Spillane. However, it was also revealed a very marginal difference of less than 1% between the next highest voted contestant, Roxane LeBrasse, and the judges deciding that Roxane was too good to be left out of the Top 12, made it a Top 13. Unfortunately this would mean, the elimination of two people with the lowest votes, the following week.

The Grand Finale was held on 21 November 2005, with the winner being revealed as Kate DeAraugo. Kate had been outside chance to win through the duration of the season, but after the show ended, released a No. 1 single, "Maybe Tonight", a platinum selling album and a further Top 10 hit single through Sony BMG.

Runner up Emily Williams lost by 1% in the closest percentage ever in an Idol finale. She was originally signed to Sony BMG as a solo artist, but the agreement fell through and she ended up joining the girl band the Young Divas.

Lee Harding finished in third position and was signed to Sony BMG and released a # 1 single and a platinum selling album. His second single from his debut album proved to be less successful and in mid-2006 Harding was released from his contract with the label. He is currently touring and performing with his band Bedrock.

Dan England came 4th and didn't score a recording contract with a major label but recorded several independent releases and has toured with Season 2 winner Casey Donovan and Season 1 Runner-up Shannon Noll.

Anne Robertson who finished in sixth position was negotiating a deal with Sony BMG, but it was rumoured that Sony BMG was reluctant in signing her as they believed she was too similar to Season 1 contestant Paulini Curuenavuli who had been signed to the label for several years.

Other contestants from Season 3 have released numerous independent material and have toured and performed with several bands and music groups.

Winner Kate and runner-up Emily, later formed the all-girl group, Young Divas, with past Idol contestants Paulini Curuenavuli and Jessica Mauboy and previously, Ricki-Lee Coulter.

=== Ratings ===
Although averaging around the 1.5 million viewer mark, ratings were down by up to 40% on average during the third season compared to the first two seasons, which regularly drew more than 2.5 million viewers during the latter half of the competition. This created a serious situation for Ten, which was airing three Australian Idol shows every week at the time, and forced them to give away free commercial airtime to program sponsors expecting higher ratings. Commentators has theorised over the reasons why this has occurred, ranging from the viewing public being tired of the format due to Sandilands replacing the popular Dickson. This would later bring about a major Idol revamp for Season 4 which led Season 4 being one of the highest rating seasons yet.

== Semi-finals ==
=== Group 1 ===
- Daniel Spillane – "I Don't Want to Be" (Gavin DeGraw)
- Jade-Lori Crompton – "1 Thing" (Amerie)
- Lindsay West – "Time After Time" (Cyndi Lauper)
- Chloe Zuel – "Because of You" (Kelly Clarkson)
- Seth Haapu – "Signed, Sealed, Delivered" (Stevie Wonder)
- Anne Robertson – "Home" (Stephanie Mills)
- Josh Williams – "All My Life" (K-Ci & JoJo)
- Irene Bosmans – "Turn the Beat Around" (Vicki Sue Robinson / Gloria Estefan)
- Chris Luder – "Beautiful Soul" (Jesse McCartney)
- Tarni Stephens – "Sweet Child o' Mine" (Guns N' Roses)

Advancing to the Top 12: Anne Robertson, Chris Luder and Tarni Stephens
Wild Card Contenders: Daniel Spillane, Lindsay West, Chloe Zuel, Josh Williams, Irene Bosmans

=== Group 2 ===
- Milly Edwards – "I Just Want to Make Love to You" (Etta James)
- Ben Worthington – "Tell Her About It" (Billy Joel)
- Laura Gissara – "Don't Let Go (Love)" (En Vogue)
- Victoria McGee – "My Immortal" (Evanescence)
- David Mardini – "A Song for Mama" (Boyz II Men)
- Roxane LeBrasse – "A Natural Woman" (Aretha Franklin)
- Kate DeAraugo – "For Once in My Life" (Stevie Wonder)
- Michael Williamson – "I'll Be There" (The Jackson 5)
- Catherine Vasilakis – "Feeling Alright" (Joe Cocker)
- Rocky Loprevite – "Incomplete" (Backstreet Boys)

Advancing to the Top 12: Kate DeAraugo, Milly Edwards and Laura Gissara
Wild Card Contenders: Roxane LeBrasse and Michael Williamson

=== Group 3 ===
- Nat Matiuk – "Light My Fire" (The Doors)
- Jeremy Bourke – "If You Could Only See" (Tonic)
- Lauren Street – "Simply the Best" (Tina Turner)
- Leah Rushforth – "Low" (Kelly Clarkson)
- Joe Sait – "Always" (Bon Jovi)
- Natalie Zahra – "When You Believe" (Mariah Carey & Whitney Houston)
- Lee Harding – "The Anthem" (Good Charlotte)
- Dan England – "Try a Little Tenderness" (Otis Redding)
- Emily Williams – "Make It Happen" (Mariah Carey)
- James Kannis – "Change the World" (Eric Clapton)

Advancing to the Top 12: Dan England, Lee Harding and Natalie Zahra
Wild Card Contenders: Lauren Street, Emily Williams and James Kannis

=== Wildcards ===
- Chloe Zuel – "Come on Over" (Christina Aguilera)
- Lindsay West – "Bed of Roses" (Bon Jovi)
- Roxane LeBrasse – "All by Myself" (Eric Carmen)
- Michael Williamson – "Ready for Love" (India.Arie)
- Lauren Street – "The Lady Is a Tramp" (Frank Sinatra)
- Josh Williams – "Lonely No More" (Rob Thomas)
- Irene Bosmans – "Greatest Love of All" (Whitney Houston)
- James Kannis – "Drift Away" (Dobie Gray)
- Emily Williams – "To Zion" (Lauryn Hill)
- Daniel Spillane – "Gimme Some Lovin'" (Spencer Davis Group)

Advancing to the Top 13: James Kannis, Emily Williams, Daniel Spillane and Roxane LeBrasse

== Weekly Song Themes ==
Date	Week	Theme
11 September	Top 13	Australian Made
18 September	Top 11	The '60s
25 September	Top 10	Rock
2 October	Top 9	Contestant's Choice
9 October	Top 8	Big Band
16 October	Top 7	The '80s
23 October	Top 6	Motown
30 October	Top 5	The '70s
6 October	Top 4	Elvis Presley
13 November	Top 3	Number Ones

=== Top 13 – Australian Made ===
Order	Contestant	Song	Result
1	Kate DeAraugo	"Please Don't Ask Me" by John Farnham	Safe
2	Dan England	"Cryin' Shame" by Johnny Diesel	Safe
3	Lee Harding	"Holy Grail" by Hunters & Collectors	Safe
4	Roxane LeBrasse	"Forever Now" by Cold Chisel	Safe
5	Anne Robertson	"I Don't Want To Be With Nobody But You" by Absent Friends	Safe
6	Tarni Stephens	"(Baby I've Got You) On My Mind" by Powderfinger	Eliminated
7	Natalie Zahra	"Absolutely Everybody" by Vanessa Amorosi	Safe
8	Emily Williams	"Buses and Trains" by Bachelor Girl	Safe
9	Daniel Spillane	"Tucker's Daughter" by Ian Moss	Safe
10	Chris Luder	"Throw Your Arms Around Me" by Hunters & Collectors	Eliminated
11	James Kannis	"The Day You Went Away" by Wendy Matthews	Safe
12	Laura Gissara	"You're My World" by Cilla Black / Daryl Braithwaite	Safe
13	Milly Edwards	"Playing to Win" by John Farnham	Bottom 3

== The Top 13 Contestants ==
=== Kate DeAraugo ===
Anna Katherine "Kate" Jenna DeAraugo (born 5 November 1985), is an Australian singer, and was the winner of the third season of Australian Idol in 2005. Kate never scored a touchdown from judge Mark Holden, but was the only contestant from this series who was never actually in the bottom three or two. Kate released a platinum selling album and a number one single. She is also a member of the multi platinum selling group, Young Divas with Emily Williams, Paulini and Jessica Mauboy.

Audition: "Young Hearts Run Free" by Kym Mazelle
Theatre Week (Round 1):
Theatre Week (Round 3): "Finally" by CeCe Peniston
Top 30: "For Once in My Life" by Stevie Wonder
Top 13: "Please Don't Ask Me" by John Farnham
Top 11: "Rescue Me" by Fontella Bass
Top 10: "I Want It All" by Queen
Top 9: "Not That Kind" by Anastacia
Top 8: "Cry Me a River" by Patti Austin
Top 7: "Ain't Nobody" by Chaka Khan
Up Close & Personal: "Ironic" by Alanis Morissette
Top 6: "I Wish" by Stevie Wonder
Top 5: "Lady Marmalade" by Patti LaBelle
Top 4: "The Impossible Dream" and "Burning Love" by Elvis Presley
Top 3: "Heaven" by Bryan Adams and "Like a Prayer" by Madonna
Top 2: "Shackles (Praise You)" by Mary Mary, "How Could an Angel Break My Heart" by Toni Braxton, "Maybe Tonight" (winner's Single)

=== Emily Williams ===
Emily Williams (born 8 October 1984 in New Zealand), a former factory worker, was the runner-up and is a member of the band Young Divas. Emily was in the bottom three only once (the Top 7) and scored three touchdowns over the course of the season, from judge, Mark Holden.

Audition: "Rock with You" by Michael Jackson
Theatre Week (Round 1): "Can't Help Falling in Love" by Elvis Presley
Theatre Week (Round 3): "Fallin'" by Alicia Keys
Top 30: "Make It Happen" by Mariah Carey
Wildcards: "To Zion" by Lauryn Hill
Top 13: "Buses and Trains" by Bachelor Girl
Top 11: "RESPECT" by Aretha Franklin
Top 10: "Bohemian Rhapsody" by Queen
Top 9: "Hero" by Mariah Carey
Top 8: "All The Way" by Frank Sinatra ~ TOUCHDOWN!
Top 7: "I Wanna Dance With Somebody" by Whitney Houston Bottom 2
Up Close & Personal: "How Come You Don't Call Me?" by Prince (Alicia Keys version)
Top 6: "River Deep, Mountain High" by Ike & Tina Turner ~ TOUCHDOWN!
Top 5: "I'm Every Woman" by Chaka Khan ~ TOUCHDOWN!
Top 4: "Can't Help Falling in Love" and "Blue Suede Shoes" by Elvis Presley
Top 3: "...Baby One More Time" by Britney Spears and "I Will Always Love You" by Dolly Parton
Top 2: "Since U Been Gone" by Kelly Clarkson, "Emotion" by Destiny's Child / The Bee Gees, "Maybe Tonight" (winner's single)

Williams now lives in Melbourne with her partner and daughter. She released her debut solo single Spellbound independently on 1 November 2010.

=== Lee Harding ===
Lee Harding (born 8 June 1983), was placed third in the competition. From Frankston, Victoria, prior to Idol, he worked at the local AMC cinema multiplex.

Audition: "Better" by The Screaming Jets, "Let Me Entertain You" by Robbie Williams, "(Sittin' On) The Dock of the Bay" by Otis Redding & "Run to Paradise" by The Choirboys
Theatre Week (Round 1): "Hard to Handle" by The Black Crowes
Theatre Week (Round 3): "Footloose" by Kenny Loggins
Top 30: "The Anthem" by Good Charlotte
Top 13: "Holy Grail" by Hunters & Collectors
Top 11: "I'm a Believer" by The Monkees
Top 10: "Roxanne" by The Police
Top 9: "Holiday" by Green Day
Top 8: "Straighten Up and Fly Right" by Robbie Williams
Top 7: "Eye of the Tiger" by Survivor
Up Close & Personal: "Plush" by Stone Temple Pilots
Top 6: "Ben" by Michael Jackson
Top 5: "My Sharona" by The Knack Bottom 2
Top 4: "Teddy Bear" and "Jailhouse Rock" by Elvis Presley
Top 3: "Faith" by George Michael (Limp Bizkit version), "Tainted Love" by Soft Cell (The Living End version) Eliminated

Harding is the lead singer of his band, Bedrock.

=== Dan England ===
Dan England (born 22 August 1983), is a former service station employee from Brisbane, noted for his dreadlock hairstyle. Before Idol, Dan was singer for the Brisbane covers band 'Bejesus' and in earlier years, attended St. Joseph's Nudgee College in Brisbane. Captivating the hearts of the Australian public with his soulful and angelic voice, dreadlock hairstyle and warm charisma, he was voted off on 7 November 2005, with a difference of 27 votes separating him from Lee Harding. It was suggested his elimination was attributed in part to the fact that his home state, Queensland, did not participate in daylight saving, and that Queensland voters therefore had one hour less to make their votes. This viewpoint was expounded further in the national parliament by the State Premier, Peter Beattie.

Audition: "Long Train Runnin'" by The Doobie Brothers
Theatre Week (Round 1): "Father and Son" by Cat Stevens
Theatre Week (Round 3):
Top 30: "Try a Little Tenderness" by Otis Redding
Top 13: "Cryin' Shame" by Diesel
Top 11: "Unchained Melody" by The Righteous Brothers
Top 10: "We Will Rock You" by Queen
Top 9: "To Be with You" by Mr. Big
Top 8: "(I Could Only) Whisper Your Name" by Harry Connick, Jr. Bottom 2
Top 7: "Broken Wings" by Mr. Mister
Up Close & Personal: "Rooster" by Alice in Chains
Top 6: "Reach Out I'll Be There" by Four Tops Bottom 3
Top 5: "Desperado" by Eagles ~ TOUCHDOWN!
Top 4: "Hound Dog" and "Heartbreak Hotel" by Elvis PresleyEliminated

After his highly successful run on Idol, Dan has continued his dream of doing what he loves best, by honing his songs and playing to tens of thousands of people in towns and cities across Australia. In 2006 he toured as a support act to Shannon Noll. Early 2007 saw him tour with Chris Murphy (fourth place getter in season 4) locally in SE Queensland. Later that year, 2008 and through to February 2009, Dan's national tour "A year on the Road tour," saw him play a record number of live shows, ironically lasting 15 months because of its success.

Dan released a self-titled, independent debut single, which was used as a part of the 2007 RAAF promotions campaign. Hitting number five on the iTunes charts, the self-titled mini-album was in stores in the third quarter of 2006. Its first single released to radio was "Reason to Fly".

=== Daniel Spillane ===
Daniel Spillane (born 29 February 1980) was eliminated on 31 October 2005, placed fifth. After previously auditioning unsuccessfully in earlier seasons, he heeded the advice of judge Mark Holden and dedicated the next year to honing his skills as a performer. He left his employment with his family's real estate business to move to Brisbane to find inspiration. Noted for his rendition of "Gimme Some Lovin'" by the Spencer Davis Group impressed the judges and he was unanimously invited to the next round.

Audition: "Gimme Some Lovin'" by Spencer Davis Group
Theatre Week (Round 1): "New York State of Mind" by Tony Bennett
Theatre Week (Round 3):
Top 30: "I Don't Want to Be" by Gavin DeGraw
Wildcards: "Gimme Some Lovin'" by Spencer Davis Group
Top 13: "Tucker's Daughter" by Ian Moss
Top 11: "I Got You (I Feel Good)" by James Brown
Top 10: "TNT" by AC/DC Bottom 3
Top 9: "If I Could" by 1927 Bottom 3
Top 8: "Feeling Good" by Michael Bublé
Top 7: "If You Don't Know Me by Now" by Simply Red Bottom 3
Up Close & Personal: "A Song for You" by Leon Russell
Top 6: "Shakey Ground" by The Temptations Bottom 2
Top 5: "Cold as Ice" by Foreigner Eliminated

=== Anne Robertson ===
Anne Robertson
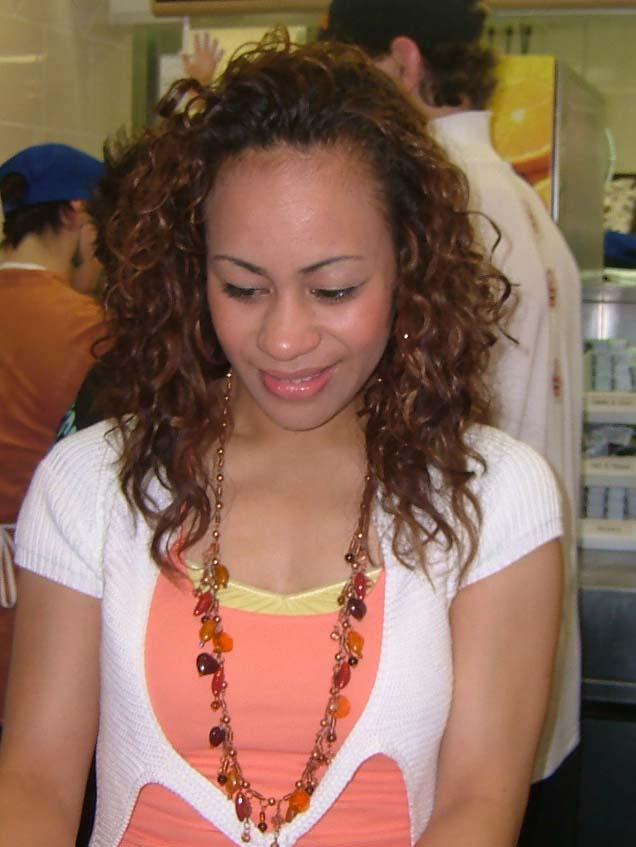

Background information
- Born: Anne Robertson; 7 March 1983 (age 42)
- Origin: Sydney
- Genres: Pop, R&B, Soul
- Occupation: Singer
- Instrument: Vocals
- Years active: 2005–present

Anne Robertson, (born 7 March 1983), is of Samoan descent, but has grown up largely in Sydney's South-West. She is mostly known as a contestant on the 2005 season of Australian Idol. She had never been into the bottom 2 or 3 until her elimination, in which she made it to the final 6.

=== Australian Idol ===
Audition: "Where Do We Go from Here" by Deborah Cox
Theatre Week (Round 1):
Theatre Week (Round 3):
Top 30: "Home" by Stephanie Mills
Top 13: "I Don't Want To Be With Nobody But You" by Absent Friends
Top 11: "When Something Is Wrong with My Baby" by Sam & Dave
Top 10: "Where the Streets Have No Name" by U2
Top 9: "Independent Women" by Destiny's Child
Top 8: "Minnie the Moocher" by Cab Calloway
Top 7: "Open Arms" by Journey
Up Close & Personal: "Dangerously in Love" by Beyoncé Knowles
Top 6: "If I Were Your Woman" by Gladys Knight Eliminated

==== After Idol ====
Anne has performed all over Australia, New Zealand, Samoa and Singapore. She has written and recorded with some of Australia's finest songwriters/producers and occasionally performs and hits the live music circuit in Sydney and around Australia. In 2008 Anne was a member of Australia's girl group, Sultry Sally. The girls' first single is a cover of the 2001 Crystal Waters floor filler, "Gypsy Woman"

In 2010, Anne released a version of Jerome Grey famous track "We are Samoa" available for purchase on iTunes, Rhapsody, Amazon, Emusic and Napster with all online proceeds going towards a charity supporting the 2009 tsunami. The most recognizable song in Samoan History and known to be the Samoa's second National Anthem. A song which was even performed by the original composer Jerome before President Carter and the United States Congress in 1980.

=== James Kannis ===
James Jay Kannis (born 5 November 1985) was eliminated on 17 October 2005, placed seventh.

Audition: "A Dollar Away" (own composition)
Theatre Week (Round 1): "Don't Let Go (Love)" by En Vogue
Theatre Week (Round 3): "Walking in Memphis" by Marc Cohn
Top 30: "Change the World" by Babyface & Eric Clapton
Wildcards: "Drift Away" by Dobie Gray
Top 13: "The Day You Went Away" by Wendy Matthews
Top 11: "Hold On, I'm Coming!" by Sam & Dave Bottom 3
Top 10: "Layla" by Eric Clapton Bottom 2
Top 9: "Love the One You're With" by Luther Vandross
Top 8: "Sway" by Michael Bublé Bottom 3
Top 7: "Truly" by Lionel Richie Eliminated

=== Milly Edwards ===
Amelia "Milly" Edwards (born 29 February 1988) was eliminated on 10 October 2005. Though she auditioned in Tasmania, she is a resident of Victoria.

Audition: "Something's Got a Hold on Me" by Etta James
Theatre Week (Round 1):
Theatre Week (Round 3):
Top 30: "I Just Wanna Make Love to You" by Etta James
Top 13: "Playing to Win" by John Farnham Bottom 3
Top 11: "Do You Love Me (Now That I Can Dance)" by The Contours
Top 10: "Somebody To Love" by Queen
Top 9: "Sunday Morning" by No Doubt Bottom 2
Top 8: "Get Happy" by Judy Garland Eliminated

=== Roxane LeBrasse ===
Roxane LeBrasse (born 26 August 1983 in Mauritius) was placed ninth in the competition, after being voted off on 3 October 2005. Initially missing out on a place in the final twelve, she became a part of the season's final thirteen. Following the announcement of the third choice, Daniel Spillane in the Wildcard show, it was revealed there was less than 1% difference in the votes separating Roxane and Daniel, therefore the judges felt Roxane was too good to not be included in the final rounds. This would mean however, the elimination of two contestants in the following week.

Roxane is one of three contestants from series 3, apart from the two who were eliminated in the first week of the finals, who was eliminated on her first time in the bottom 3. The others were Natalie Zarah (11th) and Anne Robertson (6th).

Before auditioning, LeBrasse was a back-up singer to Australian singer Jade MacRae. She appeared on a single with the popular 1990s Australian band The Rockmelons, titled "I Ain't Playin", released in mid-2002 and peaked at No. 79 in the ARIA Charts. She was also featured singing "I Got News for You", "Game Tight" and "Three's a Crowd" on their Rockies 3 album.

Audition: "I Want You Back" by The Jackson 5 & "Saving All My Love for You" by Whitney Houston
Theatre Week (Round 1):
Theatre Week (Round 3):
Top 30: "A Natural Woman" by Aretha Franklin
Wildcards: "All by Myself" by Eric Carmen
Top 13: "Forever Now" by Cold Chisel
Top 11: "You Can't Hurry Love" by The Supremes
Top 10: "We Are the Champions" by Queen
Top 9: "The Voice Within" by Christina Aguilera Eliminated

Now signed to Universal Music, her first single is called "Sexy". Produced and remixed by Sydney DJ Tony 'Super T' Vass and mixed by Sam Lamore (Tonight Only), it was released in 2007.

=== Laura Gissara ===
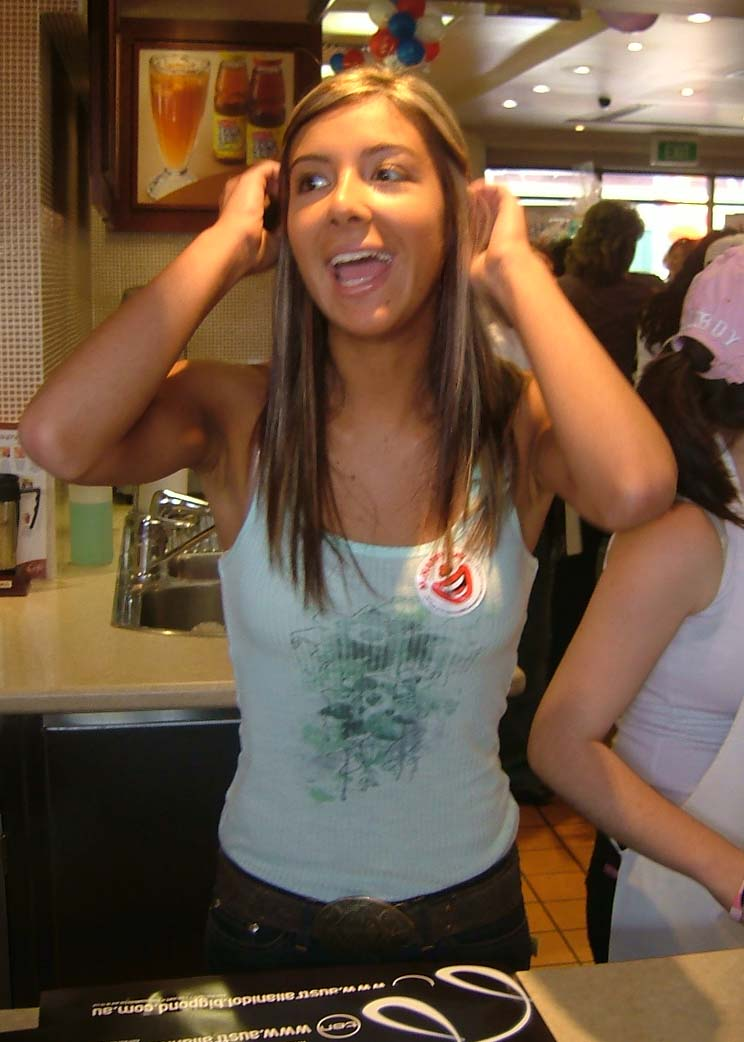
Laura Gissara

Laura Gissara (born 14 March 1984), was eliminated from the show on 26 September 2005, placed tenth.

Audition:
Theatre Week (Round 1): "All the Man That I Need" by Whitney Houston
Theatre Week (Round 3): "Don't Play That Song" by Aretha Franklin
Top 30: "Don't Let Go (Love)" by En Vogue
Top 13: "You're My World" by Cilla Black / Daryl Braithwaite
Top 11: "Don't Play That Song" by Aretha Franklin Bottom 2
Top 10: "The Greatest View" by Silverchair Eliminated

Since Idol, she has been signed by Shock Records and released a single named "Ti Amo" on 31 July 2006.

=== Natalie Zahra ===
Natalie Zahra (born 24 April 1988), was placed eleventh in the competition, being eliminated on 19 September 2005. A country girl from Innisfail, Northern Queensland, prior to Idol, she was a singing teacher and taught students of all ages.

Audition: "Somewhere Over The Rainbow" by Judy Garland
Theatre Week (Round 1):
Theatre Week (Round 3):
Top 30: "When You Believe" by Mariah Carey & Whitney Houston
Top 13: "Absolutely Everybody" by Vanessa Amorosi
Top 11: "Dancing in the Street" by Martha and the Vandellas Eliminated

=== Chris Luder ===
Chris Luder (born 18 May) was eliminated on 12 September 2005, placed twelfth in the competition. Chris made it into the Top 13, along with good friend (prior to Idol), Roxane LeBrasse, but was voted off in the first live eviction show, along with Tarni Stephens.

Audition: 'Tip of My Tongue' by Diesel
Theatre Week (Round 1): 'More than Anyone' by Gavin DeGraw
Theatre Week (Round 3): 'Sign your name' by Terence Trent D'arby
Top 30: "Beautiful Soul" by Jesse McCartney
Top 13: "Throw Your Arms Around Me" by Hunters & Collectors Eliminated

=== Tarni Stephens ===
Tarni Stephens (born 3 April 1978) was the first of the top thirteen to be eliminated, on 12 September 2005, along with fellow contestant Chris Luder. Auditioning in Brisbane, she was the lead singer in her band Tarni and became known to the Australian public for her rock style of music.

Audition: "Trouble" by Pink
Theatre Week (Round 1): "Rush You" by Baby Animals
Theatre Week (Round 3): "La La" by Ashlee Simpson
Top 30: "Sweet Child o' Mine" by Guns N' Roses
Top 13: "(Baby I've Got You) On My Mind" by Powderfinger Eliminated

== Elimination chart ==
Females	Males	Top 30	Top 13	Wild Card	Winner

Did Not Perform	Safe	Safe First	Safe Last	Eliminated

Stage:		Semi-finals			Wild Card	Finals										
Week:		17/8	22/8	29/8	5/9	12/9	19/9	26/9	3/10	10/10	17/10	24/10	31/10	7/11	14/11	21/11
Place	Contestant	Result														
1	Kate DeAraugo	Top 13														Winner
2	Emily Williams			Wild Card	Top 13						Bottom 2					Runner-up
3	Lee Harding			Top 13									Bottom 2		Elim	
4	Dan England			Top 13						Bottom 2		Bottom 3		Elim		
5	Daniel Spillane	Wild Card			Top 13			Bottom 3	Bottom 3		Bottom 3	Bottom 2	Elim			
6	Anne Robertson	Top 13										Elim				
7	James Kannis			Wild Card	Top 13		Bottom 3	Bottom 2		Bottom 3	Elim					
8	Milly Edwards		Top 13			Bottom 3			Bottom 2	Elim						
9	Roxane LeBrasse		Wild Card		Top 13				Elim							
10	Laura Gissara		Top 13				Bottom 2	Elim								
11	Natalie Zahra			Top 13			Elim									
12	Chris Luder	Top 13				Elim										
13	Tarni Stephens	Top 13				Elim										
Wild Card	Irene Bosmans	Wild Card			Elim											
Wild Card	Lauren Street			Wild Card	Elim											
Wild Card	Lindsay West	Wild Card			Elim											
Wild Card	Josh Williams	Wild Card			Elim											
Wild Card	Michael Williamson		Wild Card		Elim											
Wild Card	Chloe Zuel	Wild Card			Elim											
Semi-final 3	Jeremy Bourke			Elim												
Semi-final 3	Nat Matiuk			Elim												
Semi-final 3	Leah Rushforth			Elim												
Semi-final 3	Joe Sait			Elim												
Semi-final 2	Rocky Loprevite		Elim													
Semi-final 2	David Mardini		Elim													
Semi-final 2	Victoria McGee		Elim													
Semi-final 2	Catherine Vasilakis		Elim													
Semi-final 2	Ben Worthington		Elim													
Semi-final 1	Jade-Lori Crompton	Elim														
Semi-final 1	Seth Harper	Elim														

Preceded by Season 2 (2004)	Australian Idol; Season 3 (2005)	Succeeded by Season 4 (2006)
