= Laura Gissara =

Australian pop singer-songwriter (born 1984)

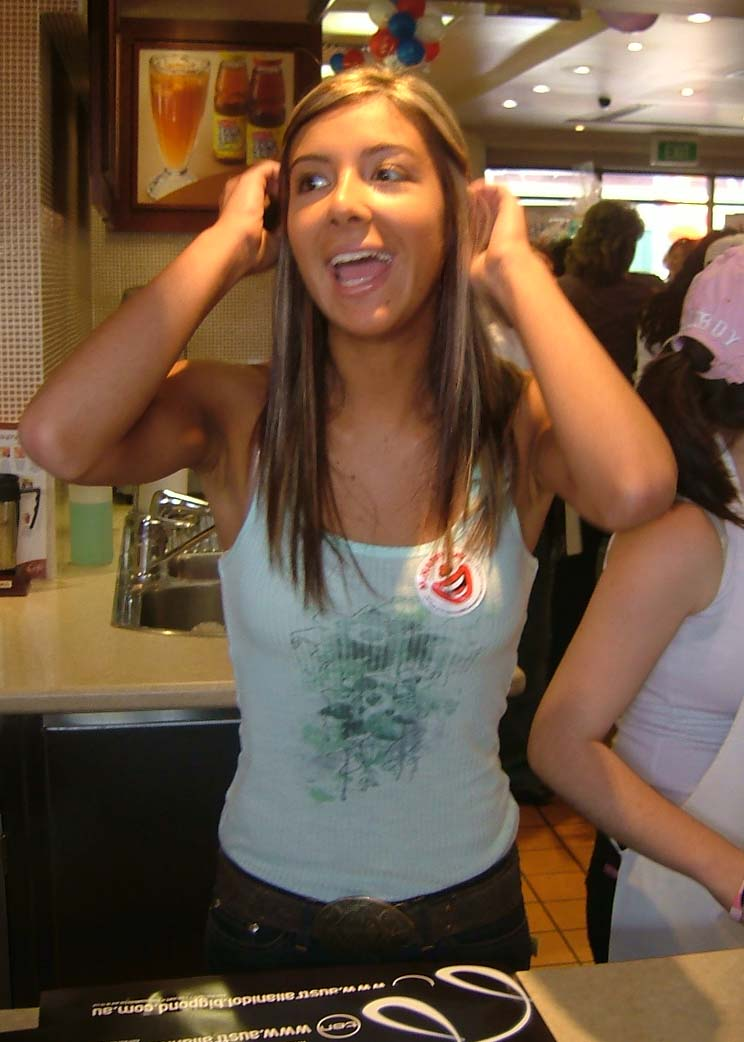
- Laura Gissara, January 2003

Background information
- Born: Laura Simone Gissara; 14 March 1984 (age 42)
- Origin: Melbourne, Australia
- Genre: Pop
- Occupation: Singer-songwriter
- Instruments: Singing, piano
- Years active: 2005–present
- Labels: In, Shock
- Website: laurasimone.com.au

Laura Simone Gissara (born 14 March 1984) is an Australian pop singer-songwriter. She was a final 10 contestant on the 2005 season of TV talent show Australian Idol and was eliminated on 26 September. In June 2006 she issued her debut single, "Ti amo", which peaked in the top 50 on the ARIA Singles Chart. It is a cover version of Laura Branigan's 1984 rendition of the Umberto Tozzi 1977 original.

== Biography ==
Laura Simone Gissara was born in 1984 to Joe Gissara, a Telstra Corporation team leader, and Ivana, a Centrelink employee. Gissara grew up in Melbourne in an Italian speaking household. From the age of sixteen she wrote songs with piano music. She admires Celine Dion and "a lot of the Boy bands who were doin amazing things with harmonies".

=== Australian Idol ===
In 2005 Laura Gissara was 21 years old when she auditioned for TV talent show, Australian Idol, in its third season. In July, after her successful audition her first performance was "All the Man That I Need" (originally by Whitney Houston) as a line of ten for the top 100. For the semi-final she sang "Don't Let Go" by En Vogue. The judges were disappointed, saying that her vocal was pitchy. However, despite the poorly judged performance, Gissara made the finals on the public's votes alongside Kate DeAraugo and Milly Edwards.

On the Australian Made theme night, Top 13, Gissara had to prove that the voting public made the correct decision in voting her through. She sang Cilla Black's "You're My World" as covered by local artist, Daryl Braithwaite. All three judges said it was the best they had ever heard her sing. On the Live Verdict the next day she was told she was safe for another week. A week later, on '60s night, Gissara sang "Don't Play That Song" by Aretha Franklin. The judges said it was pretty good but she did not put enough feeling into the song. The next night she was told she was part of the bottom three along with James Kannis and Natalie Zahra; Zahra was eliminated and Gissara was safe for another week.

On the Supergroups theme, a week later, Gissara performed "The Greatest View" by Silverchair. All judges were disappointed with her performance, she was part of the bottom three along with Kannis and Daniel Spillane. Gissara was told she had the fewest votes and was eliminated. She then sang "The Greatest View" again. During her time in the Top 13, allegations were made that her father, a Telstra employee, had tampered with the telephone voting results. An investigation ensued which discounted the claims.

==== Australian Idol performances ====
- Audition
- Theatre Week (Round 1), Top 100, Line of 10: "All the Man That I Need" by Whitney Houston
- Top 75, Group of 3: "Finally"
- Theatre Week (Round 3), Top 50, solo: "Don't Play That Song" by Aretha Franklin
- Top 30: "Don't Let Go (Love)" by En Vogue
- Top 13, Australian Made: "You're My World" by Cilla Black, Daryl Braithwaite
- Top 11, '60s: "Don't Play That Song" by Aretha Franklin – Bottom 2
- Top 10, Supergroups: "The Greatest View" by Silverchair – Eliminated

=== Later career ===
In April 2006 Laura Gissara announced on her official website that she had signed with In Records/Shock Records. Her debut single, "Ti amo" was released on 31 July, while its video had premiered on rage on 1 July. "Ti amo" is a cover version of Laura Branigan's 1984 rendition of the Umberto Tozzi 1977 original. It peaked at No. 49 on the ARIA Singles Chart. It also reached No. 14 on the Australasian Artists Singles Chart, and No. 3 on the Independent AIR Chart. "Shake It Down" was issued as a single in 2008, which was co-written by Gissara with Katie Michaelson and Stephen Lovchyld. Gissara later released material under her first two names, Laura Simone, including an extended play, This Is Me, in 2010. The release includes "Frozen" which was co-written by Gissara and Michaelson.

== Discography ==
=== Extended plays ===
List of EPs, with selected details
Title	Details
This Is Me (as Laura Simone)	Released: 2010; Format: Digital

=== Singles ===
List of singles, with selected chart positions
Title	Year	Peak chart positions
Title	Year	AUS
"Ti Amo"	2006	49
"Shake It Down"	2008	—
