= Emily Williams =

Singer-songwriter (born 1984)

- Born: 8 October 1984 (age 42); South Auckland, New Zealand
- Occupations: Singer; songwriter
- Years active: 2005–present
- Children: 1
- Relatives: J.Williams (brother)
- Musical career
- Genres: R&B; pop
- Instrument: Vocals
- Label: Sony BMG
- Formerly of: Young Divas
- Website: www.emilywilliams.com.au

Emily Williams (born 8 October 1984) is a New Zealand-born Australian singer-songwriter. She rose to fame in 2005 on the third season of Australian Idol and became the runner-up of the competition. After Idol, Williams signed with Sony BMG Australia and enjoyed commercial success as a member of the Australian girl group Young Divas. The group released two top-ten albums, Young Divas (2006) and New Attitude (2007), and achieved three top-fifteen singles, including the hugely successful "This Time I Know It's for Real". After the Young Divas disbanded in 2008 and Williams' contract with Sony BMG ended, she began releasing her solo music independently. Williams' debut solo single "Spellbound" was released in 2010, followed by the release of her debut solo album Uncovered in 2012.

== Early life ==
Emily Williams was born on 8 October 1984 in South Auckland, New Zealand, to a Fiji–Samoan family.

Williams' has an older sister – Lavina Williams, who was a contestant on Australian Idol in 2006 and also a younger brother – J.Williams, a singer/dancer in New Zealand. During Willams' early years, her father was very strict when it came to devoting yourself to religion and music. Before appearing on Idol, she worked as a forklift operator from Inala, Queensland.

== Career ==
=== 2005: Australian Idol ===
Williams auditioned for the third season of Australian Idol in 2005. During the season, she scored three touchdowns from judge Mark Holden. On 15 November 2005, betting agency Centrebet announced their final-week prediction that Williams would win the competition, with her odds at $1.36 and Kate DeAraugo at $3.00. However, on 21 November 2005, it was announced that the winner was DeAraugo.

Round	Song choice	Original artist	Result
Audition	"Rock with You"	Michael Jackson	Advanced
Theatre Week (Round 1)	"Can't Help Falling in Love"	Elvis Presley	Advanced
Theatre Week (Round 2)	"Finally"	CeCe Peniston	Advanced
Theatre Week (Round 3)	"Fallin'"	Alicia Keys	Advanced
Top 30	"Make It Happen"	Mariah Carey	Wild Card
Wildcard	"To Zion"	Lauryn Hill	Advanced
Top 13	"Buses and Trains"	Bachelor Girl	Safe
Top 11	"Respect"	Aretha Franklin	Safe
Top 10	"Bohemian Rhapsody"	Queen	Safe
Top 9	"Hero"	Mariah Carey	Safe
Top 8	"All the Way"	Frank Sinatra	Safe
Top 7	"I Wanna Dance With Somebody"	Whitney Houston	Bottom 2
Up Close & Personal	"How Come U Don't Call Me Anymore?"	Prince	Safe
Top 6	"River Deep – Mountain High"	Ike Turner & Tina Turner	Safe
Top 5	"I'm Every Woman"	Chaka Khan	Safe
Top 4	"Can't Help Falling in Love"	Elvis Presley	Safe
Top 4	"Blue Suede Shoes"	Elvis Presley	Safe
Top 3	"...Baby One More Time"	Britney Spears	Safe
Top 3	"I Will Always Love You"	Whitney Houston	Safe
Top 2	"Since U Been Gone"	Kelly Clarkson	Runner-up
Top 2	"Emotion"	Samantha Sang	Runner-up
Top 2	"Maybe Tonight" (winners single)	Kate DeAraugo	Runner-up

=== 2006–08: Young Divas ===
In January 2006, Sony BMG Australia announced that William's had signed a recording contract with their label, and that she would release her debut album later that year. She re-located to Melbourne to begin writing and co-writing tracks with both local and international songwriters. However, Williams' album was never released.

In early 2006, Williams was asked by her record label to be part of a girl group concept, with previous Australian Idol contestants Paulini, Ricki-Lee Coulter and Kate DeAraugo, for a 17-date national tour to promote all four singers as solo artists. Alongside the national tour, they released a cover of the Donna Summer classic "This Time I Know It's For Real" in May 2006, under the name Young Divas. The song peaked at number two on the ARIA Singles Chart and was certified platinum by the Australian Recording Industry Association (ARIA) for shipments of 70,000 units. A second single followed in November 2006—a cover of Lonnie Gordon's disco classic "Happenin' All Over Again". It peaked at number nine and was certified gold for shipments of 35,000 units. Following on from the success of their singles and tour, the Young Divas released their self-titled debut album, featuring remakes of disco classics, on 14 November 2006. The album debuted at number four on the ARIA Albums Chart and was certified double platinum for shipments of 140,000 units. A cover of Hazell Dean's 1983 hit "Searchin'" was released as the group's third single in March 2007, and reached number 40.

In May 2007, Williams became a contestant on the New Zealand reality television show Pop's Ultimate Star, and placed fourth in the competition. In September 2007, it was revealed that Australian Idol season four runner-up Jessica Mauboy was the new member of the Young Divas replacing Coulter, who left the group to resume her solo career. They then went on to release their second studio album New Attitude on 26 November 2007. The album debuted at number 10 and was certified gold, while its lead single "Turn Me Loose" peaked at number 15. In August 2008, it was announced that both Paulini and Mauboy had quit the Young Divas in order to resume their solo careers, leaving DeAraugo and Williams as the only remaining members. However, both DeAraugo and Williams also resumed their solo careers, and the Young Divas officially disbanded. Following the group's disbandment, Williams' contract with Sony BMG ended.

=== 2009–present: Solo career ===
In 2010, Williams became a reading ambassador for The Pyjama Foundation, which raises awareness and support to help children improve their literacy skills. On 21 October 2010, she made a television appearance on Ready Steady Cook with fellow Australian Idol contestant Cosima De Vito. On 1 November 2010, she released her debut solo single "Spellbound", independently. The single was promoted by Williams through a live televised performance on The Morning Show. She also performed the song at clubs in Brisbane and Sydney, and also toured shopping malls in Melbourne and Gold Coast. The music video premiered on YouTube on 4 November 2010. In December 2010, Williams received a nomination for "Australian Female Artist of the Year" at the PopRepublic.tv IT List Awards. Williams' second single "You're Mine" was made available for download on 14 February 2011, to coincide with Valentine's Day. She performed the song on The Morning Show. On 1 March 2011, she released a ballad titled "Never Alone", to raise support for the February 2011 Christchurch earthquake. All proceeds from the single went to the New Zealand Red Cross.

Williams' debut solo album Uncovered was released independently on 10 February 2012. In June 2012, she was featured on dance music producer The Popstar's single "Spotlight", which also appeared on her album Uncovered. In April 2013, Williams released her fourth lead single "Get It". In 2013, Williams was featured on British rapper and The Valleys star Leeroy Reed's single "Can't Get Enough" and scored her second nomination at the PopRepublic.tv Awards for "Favourite Australian Female Artist". In January 2014, she was featured on Geordie Shore star Gaz Beadle debut single "Party Like a Rockstar (Up Your Game)" with UK group The Risk. In July 2015, Williams released her fifth lead single "The Way It Is", which debuted at number seven on the AIR 100% Independent Singles Chart. This was followed up by the release of her sixth lead single "Get Your Life" in October 2016, earning her another nomination at the PopRepublic.tv Awards for "Favourite Australian Female Artist".

In 2017, Williams made her musical theatre debut in the Australian production of The Bodyguard, as the alternate lead for Paulini, playing the lead role of Rachel Marron at certain performances. Williams also made a cameo appearance in the 2017 Australian horror film Boaras a passenger.

In 2021, during the lockdown, Williams collaborated with international DJs Ricci-G and Josh Goodwill to release "Ride with Me." Later, there was another collaboration for the track "All I Need" with Kisch, which was signed to Love and Other Records UK.

In 2022, Williams headlined a tour in Australia named Synthony 2022/23. Subsequently, Williams began her own solo tour in Australian venues called Woman of Colour. During the tour, she performed a range of songs from various artists.

In 2023, producers Michael Harrison and David Ian revealed that Emily Williams would play Rachel Marron in the UK tour of 'The Bodyguard' Musical. She is the first woman of Polynesian descent to score a leading role in a UK musical.

In September 2023, Emily was recognized as the Global Ambassador for Women of Colour Australia.

In October 2023, Williams released "What Am I Gonna Do" with DJ John Course, which reached #8 on the ARIA Club Charts.

== Personal life ==
Williams has a daughter with Richie Lio. She separated from Lio in 2007.

== Discography ==
=== Studio albums ===
List of studio albums, with selected details
Title	Album details
Uncovered	Released: 10 February 2012; Format: Digital download
Thirty Something	Released: 22 October 2021; Format: Digital download, streaming

=== Singles ===
==== As lead artist ====
List of lead singles, with selected chart positions
Title	Year	Peak chart positions	Albums
Title	Year	AUS Indie	Albums
"Spellbound"	2010	—	Uncovered
"You're Mine"	2011	—	Uncovered
"Never Alone"	2011	—	—N/a
"Get It"	2013	—	Uncovered
"The Way It Is"	2015	7	—N/a
"Get Your Life"	2016	—	—N/a
"—" denotes a single that did not chart.

==== As featured artist ====
List of featured singles
Title	Year	Album
"Spotlight" (The Popstar featuring Emily Williams)	2012	Uncovered
"Can't Get Enough" (Leeroy featuring Emily Williams)	2013	—N/a
"Party Like a Rockstar (Up Your Game)" (Gaz & Olabean featuring The Risk and Emily Williams)	2014	—N/a

=== Album appearances ===
Title	Year	Album
"Buses and Trains"	2005	Australian Idol 3: The Final 13
"Ready"	2005	Australian Idol 3: The Final 13
"I Will Always Love You"	2006	Young Divas

=== Music videos ===
List of music videos
Title	Year	Director(s)
"Spellbound"	2010	
"Get It"	2013	

== Awards and nominations ==
Year	Type	Recipient	Award	Result
2006	Nickelodeon Australian Kids' Choice Awards	Young Divas	Fave Group	Nominated
2006	Nickelodeon Australian Kids' Choice Awards	"This Time I Know It's for Real" with Young Divas	Fave Song	Won
2010	PopRepublic.tv Awards	Emily Williams	Favourite Australian Female Artist	Nominated
2013	PopRepublic.tv Awards	Emily Williams	Favourite Australian Female Artist	Nominated
2016	PopRepublic.tv Awards	Emily Williams	Favourite Australian Female Artist	Nominated
