= James Kannis =

Greek-Australian singer (born 1985)

- Born: James Jay Kannis; 5 November 1985 (age 40)
- Genres: Hip hop, R&B, pop
- Occupations: Singer, songwriter
- Instrument: Vocals
- Years active: 2005–2007
- Label: Shock
- Website: jameskannis.com.au

James John Kannis (born 5 November 1985) is a Greek-Australian singer who participated in the reality television talent show, Australian Idol. Kannis was placed in seventh position.

== Career ==
Kannis auditioned for the third series of Australian Idol, perming the self-written song, "A Dollar Away". Kannis made it through the live shows, placing 7th.

Australian Idol performances and results (2005)
Episode	Song	Result
Audition	"A Dollar Away"	Through to the Theatre Rounds
Theatre Rounds	"Don't Let Go (Love)", "Stayin' Alive", "Walking in Memphis"	Through to top 30
Top 30	"Change the World"	Through to wildcard round
Wildcard round	"Drift Away"	Through to live shows
Live show 1: Australian Made (Top 13)	"The Day You Went Away"	Saved by Public
Live show 2: 60s Hits (Top 11)	"Hold On, I'm Coming!"	Saved by Public
Live show 3: Supergroups (Top 10)	"Layla"	Saved by Public
Live show 4: Idols' Choice (Top 9)	"Love the One You're With"	Saved by Public
Live show 5: Big Band (Top 8)	"Sway"	Saved by Public
Live show 6: 80s Hits (Top 7)	"Truly"	Eliminated by Public

Following his Australian Idol Run, Kannis signed with Zeus Records/Shock. His debut single, "Love 2 Love", which was released on 11 November 2006 peaked at No. 35 on the ARIA Singles Chart,

== Discography ==
=== Singles ===
List of singles, with Australian chart positions
Title	Year	Peak chart positions
Title	Year	AUS
"Love 2 Love"	2006	35

== See also ==
- Australian Idol 2005
