= Chris Murphy (Australian singer) =

Australian male singer-songwriter

Chris Scooby Murphy
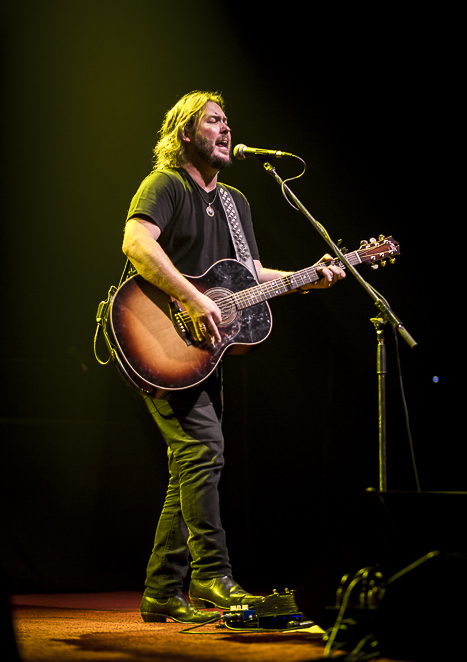
- Murphy in 2014

Background information
- Born: Christopher Bryce Scooby Murphy; 25 March 1976 (age 50); Australia
- Origin: Perth, Western Australia
- Genres: Rock
- Years active: 2004–present

Christopher Bryce Scooby Murphy (born 25 March 1976, Perth) is an Australian male singer-songwriter who placed fourth in Australian Idol 2006.

Starting piano lessons at age 11, he added guitar to his list of skills and began playing in his band, 'Murphy's Lore' at the age of 16. A member of the Western Australian band Murphy's Lore, he has led the group since its formation in 1993. During that period the band released three independent albums: People in Grass Houses (1995), Best Laid Plans (1999), and The Universe Conspires (2002). Murphy re-joined the band in 2014 where he is currently a full-time member.

Murphy's Lore has played most venues in Perth and have toured extensively north and south of the State as well as performing many high-profile gigs around the country. They have done tours to Singapore, and supported Australian acts such as Jimmy Barnes and Daryl Braithwaite. Regular performances led to Murphy's inclusion on the Kevin Bloody Wilson live in the UK & Ireland 2004 tour.

In Australian Idol, Murphy is perhaps best known for his performance of Evie (part 1). Marcia Hines said it was "One of the most exciting performances we've ever seen on that stage" and Mark Holden awarded it a "Touchdown".

In 2008, Murphy was invited to do the West Australian leg of an Adam Brand/James Blundell tour as the opening act. During the latter half of 2010, Murphy and his backing band were selected for the nationwide tour support for Creedence Clearwater Revisited. Murphy opened the show around the country to thousands of fans at venues such as the Sydney Entertainment Centre, Challenge Stadium (Perth), Rod Laver Stadium (Melbourne), and the Newcastle Entertainment Centre.

2014 saw Murphy support the Perth leg of the American kids show Yo Gabba Gabba!'s national tour as well playing bass in “The Angels 100%” Perth concert date. Murphy has four solo albums released: Elbow Room (2005), Chris Murphy (2007), Look At This/Remember That – Tour Edition (2010), and Ghost Town (2016).

The Murphy Brothers also features with his brothers Kieran and 2004 Australian Idol Top 3 finalist Courtney. They have released the album “Thick As Thieves in 2013. In June 2016, Murphy opened the Perth dates of the Richard Marx tour. After the iTunes Country Chart toppers "The One", "Kid From The Country", and "Working For A Living", Murphy released the 4th single from the Zero Hour Records album Ghost Town, entitled "Not Like It Was Before", co-written by album Producer Michael Carpenter.

== Australian Idol Performances ==
- Perth Auditions: "World and Universe" by Chris Murphy
- Theatre Round – Day Two Group Performance: "Beautiful Day" by U2
- Theatre Round – Day Three Solo Performance: "Cry in Shame" by Johnny Diesel
- Top 24: "Crazy Little Thing Called Love" by Queen
- Wildcard: "Holy Grail" by Hunters & Collectors
- Top 12 – Contestant's Choice: "Wish You Well" by Bernard Fanning
- Top 11 – Rock – "Is It Just Me?" by The Darkness
- Top 10 – No. 1 Hits: "Against All Odds (Take a Look at Me Now)" by Phil Collins
- Top 9 – Contestant's year of birth: "Life in the Fast Lane" by Eagles
- Top 8 – Disco: "Play That Funky Music" by Wild Cherry
- Top 7 – Acoustic: "No More Lonely Nights" by Paul McCartney
- Top 7 – Up Close & Personal Special – "Diamond Days" by Chris Murphy
- Top 6 – Rock Swing: "You Shook Me All Night Long" by AC/DC
- Top 5 – Australian Music: "Evie Part One" by Stevie Wright TOUCHDOWN !
- Top 4 – Viewer's Choice: "Something Beautiful" by Robbie Williams
- Top 4 – Viewer's Choice: "Mean to Me" by Crowded House

== Discography ==
- 1995: People in Grass Houses w/Murphy's Lore
- 1999: Best Laid Plans w/Murphy's Lore
- 2002: The Universe Conspires w/Murphy's Lore
- 2005: Elbow Room
- 2007: Chris Murphy
- 2010: Look at This/Remember That
- 2013: Thick As Thieves w/The Murphy Brothers
- 2014: Happy Boy (EP)
- 2016: Ghost Town
- 2021: Fall on Me w/The Murphy Brothers
