= The Masked Singer (Australian TV series) season 3 =

The Masked Singer
- Season 3
- Presented by: Osher Günsberg
- Judges: Jackie O; Dave Hughes; Dannii Minogue; Urzila Carlson
- No. of contestants: 12
- Winner: Anastacia as "Vampire"
- Runner-up: Em Rusciano as "Dolly"
- No. of episodes: 11

Release
- Original network: Network 10
- Original release: 13 September – 5 October 2021

Season chronology
- ← Previous; Season 2 Next → Season 4

The third season of The Masked Singer Australia was renewed in October 2020 and premiered on Monday, 13 September 2021. Osher Günsberg returned as the show's host. In the Grand Finale on 5 October 2021, Anastacia (as “Vampire”) was revealed as the winner, Em Rusciano (as “Dolly”) was the runner-up, and Axle Whitehead (as “Mullet”), was third.

== Production ==
The costumes were designed and created by Australian Academy Award and BAFTA Award-Winning costume designer Tim Chappel, who is best known for his work on The Adventures of Priscilla, Queen of the Desert with Lizzy Gardiner.

The third series was filmed with a virtual audience between 3 and 24 July 2021 and premiered on 13 September 2021.

=== Impact of the COVID-19 pandemic ===
As a result of the COVID-19 pandemic and lockdown restrictions in Greater Sydney, the in-studio audience again consisted of socially-distanced production staff wearing costumes, like the previous season. Additionally, 100 Australian viewers were selected as a virtual audience. They streamed the live performances and voted for their favourite character's performance. The performer with the fewest votes was unmasked in each episode. For confidentiality, the virtual audience did not witness the elimination's result or the unmasking of the performers.

== Panellists and host ==
Radio personality Jackie O, singer-songwriter Dannii Minogue and comedians Dave Hughes and Urzila Carlson returned to the judging panel from the previous season. Osher Günsberg returned as host.

Season 3 panellists and host

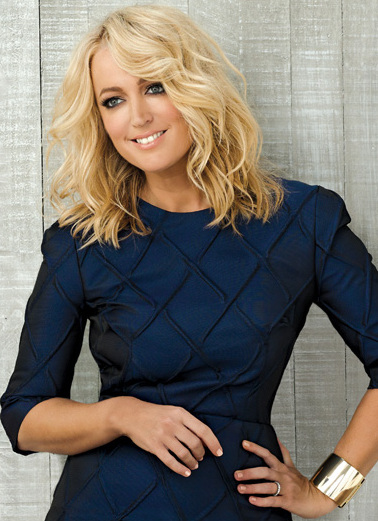
Jackie O

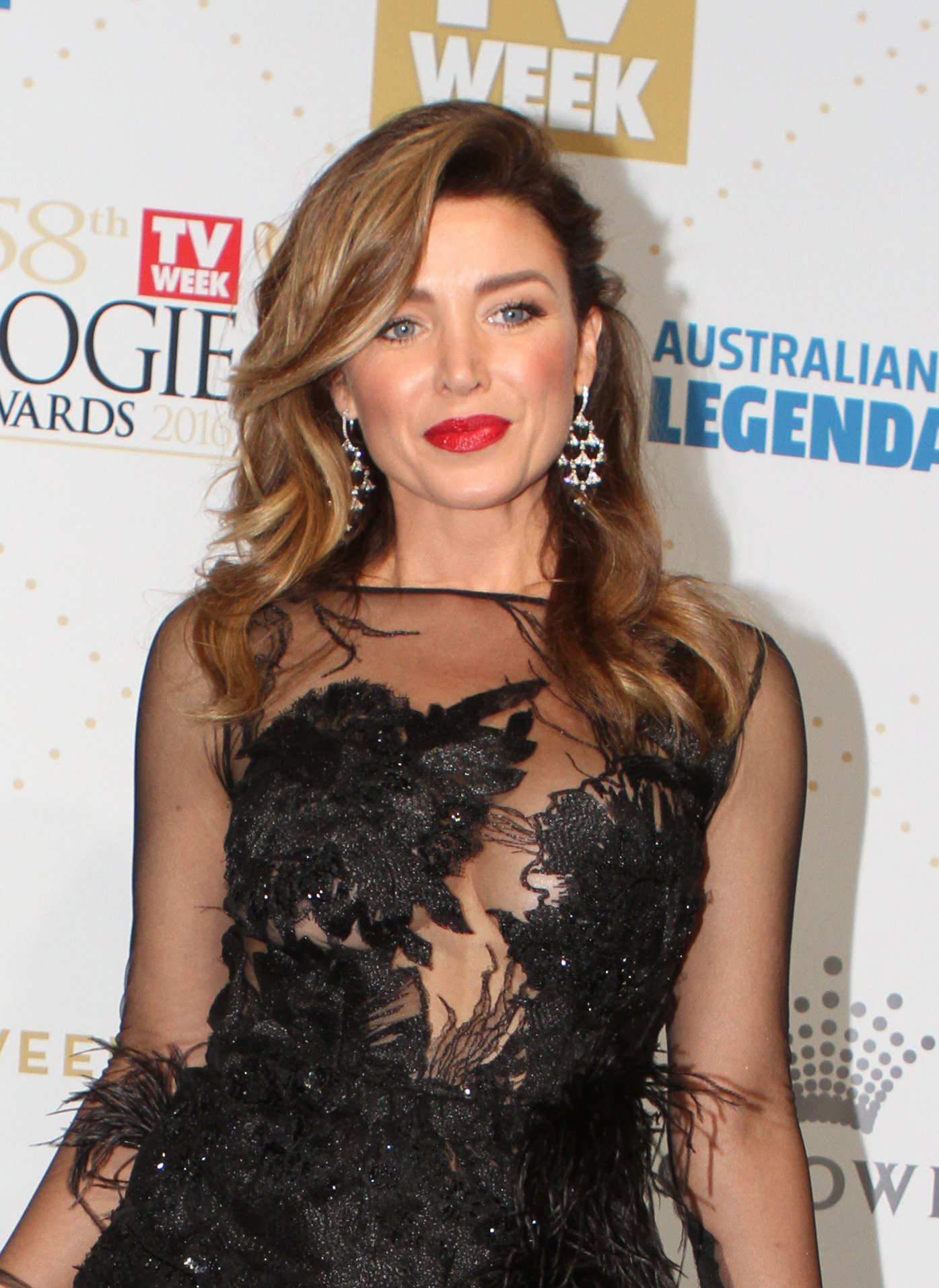
Dannii Minogue

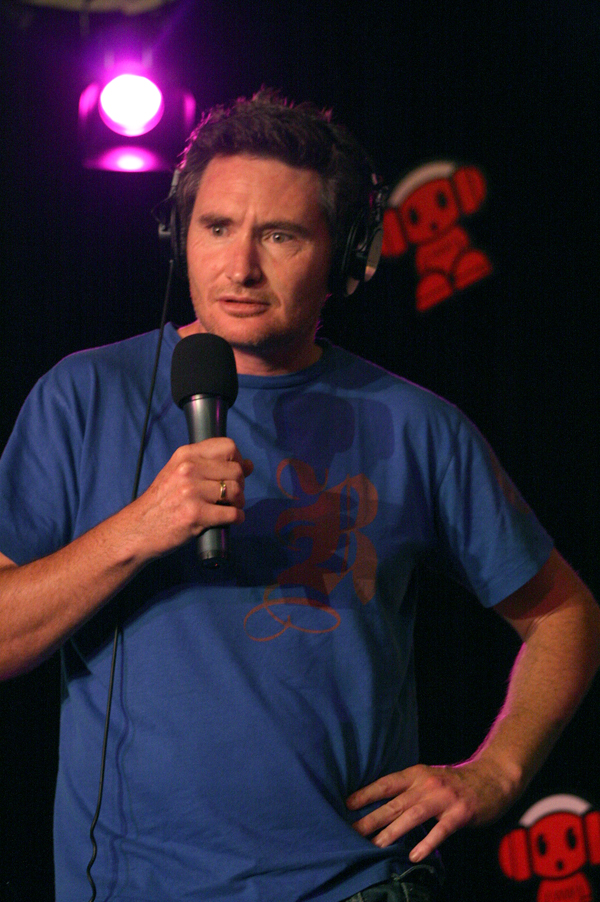
Dave Hughes

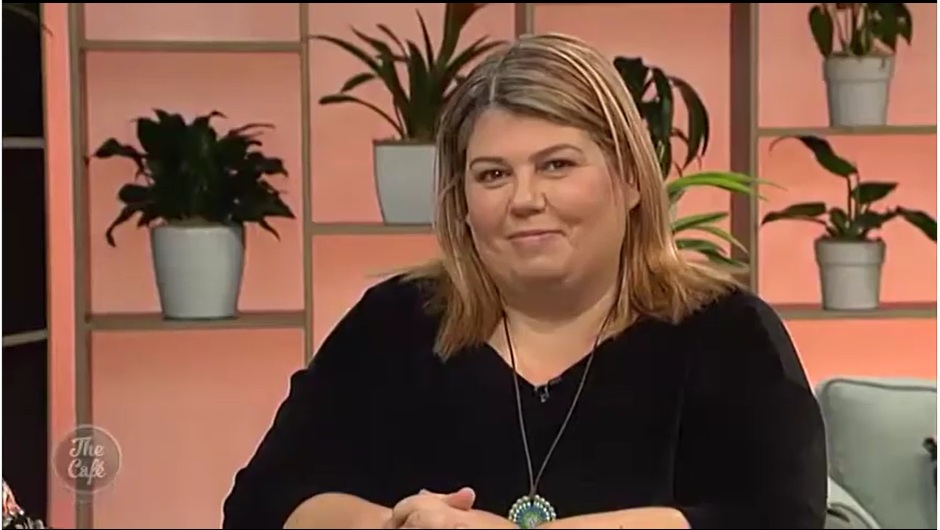
Urzila Carlson

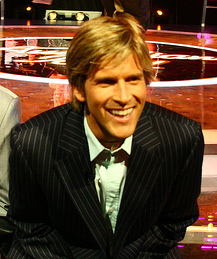
Osher Günsberg

== Contestants ==
In the third season, there were twelve regular contestants who competed in the competition. Before the season began, Network Ten revealed that the cast included Hollywood A-listers, Logie Award winners, a Brit Award winner, humanitarian, chart-toppers, Grammy Award winner and award-winning superstars. On 17 June 2021, Network Ten announced the stage identities of the first six masks. The Mullet and Piñata were announced on 10 August 2021 in the first trailer. On 24 August 2021, the final four masks were announced in the second trailer.

For the first time on the Australian version of the series, a special guest mask performed as Rubble from Paw Patrol in a once-off appearance on Episode 6 which was revealed to be Kyle Sandilands.

| Stage name | Celebrity | Occupation | Episodes | | | | | | | | | |
| Stage name | Celebrity | Occupation | 1 | 2 | 3 | 4 | 5 | 6 | 7 | 8 | 10 | 11 |
|---|---|---|---|---|---|---|---|---|---|---|---|---|
| Vampire | Anastacia | Singer | WIN | | SAFE | | SAFE | | SAFE | SAFE | SAFE | WINNER |
| Dolly | Em Rusciano | Comedian | WIN | | SAFE | | SAFE | | SAFE | SAFE | SAFE | RUNNER-UP |
| Mullet | Axle Whitehead | Actor | RISK | | SAFE | | SAFE | | SAFE | SAFE | SAFE | THIRD |
| Kebab | Jack Vidgen | Singer | | WIN | | SAFE | | SAFE | SAFE | SAFE | OUT | |
| Baby | Ella Hooper | Singer | | WIN | | SAFE | | SAFE | SAFE | OUT | | |
| Lightning | Alli Simpson | Singer/actress | | RISK | | SAFE | | SAFE | OUT | | | |
| Atlantis | Macy Gray | Singer | | RISK | | SAFE | | OUT | | | | |
| Pavlova | Mahalia Barnes | Singer | WIN | | SAFE | | OUT | | | | | |
| Piñata | Lote Tuqiri | Rugby player | | WIN | | OUT | | | | | | |
| Professor | Ben Lee | Singer | RISK | | OUT | | | | | | | |
| Duster | George Calombaris | Chef/TV personality | | OUT | | | | | | | | |
| Volcano | Vinnie Jones | Actor/former footballer | OUT | | | | | | | | | |

The masked singer won their face-off and remained in the competition.
The masked singer lost their face-off, but was not eliminated.
The masked singer was safe from elimination.
The masked singer was eliminated from the competition and unmasked upon their elimination.
The masked singer did not perform.
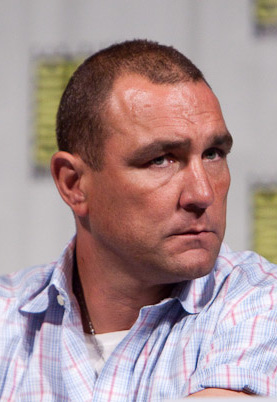
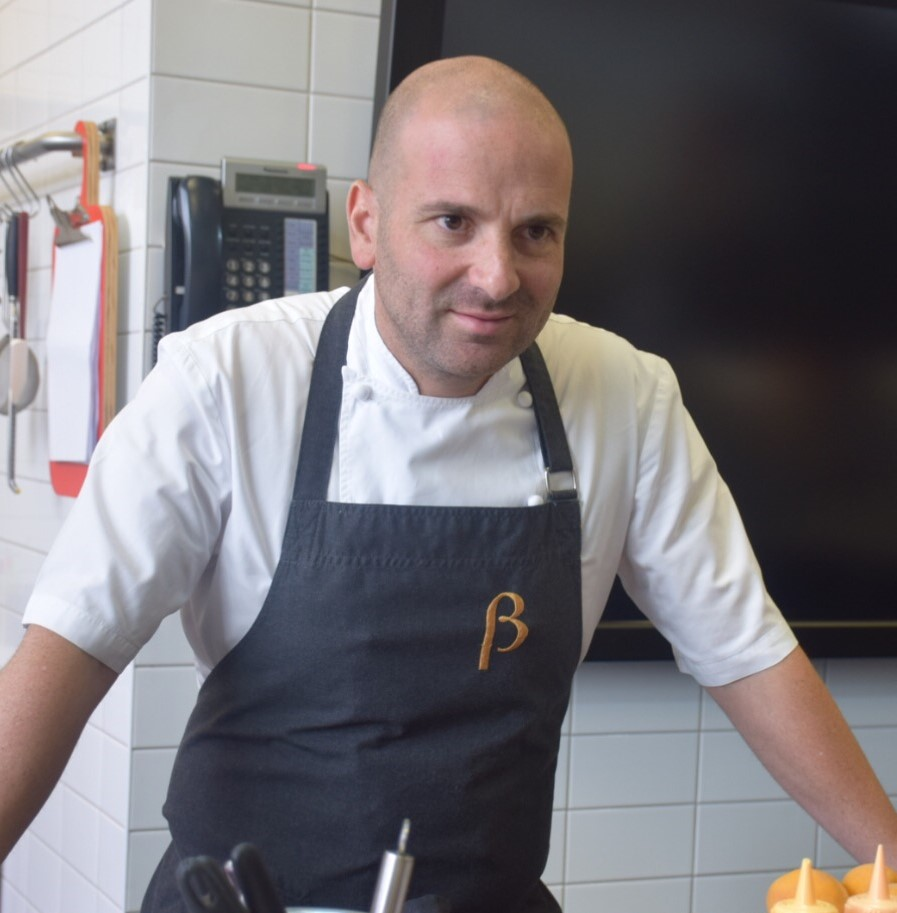
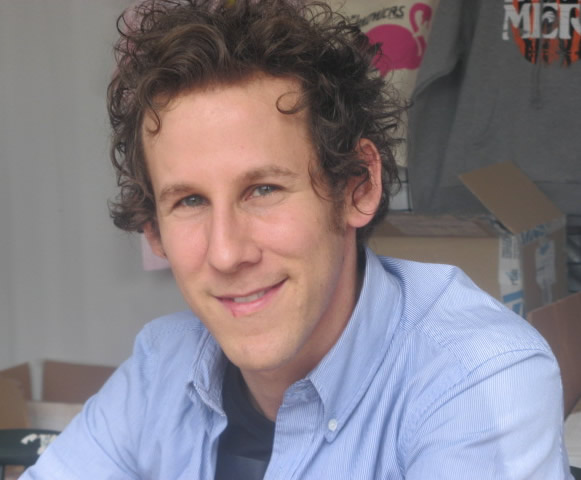
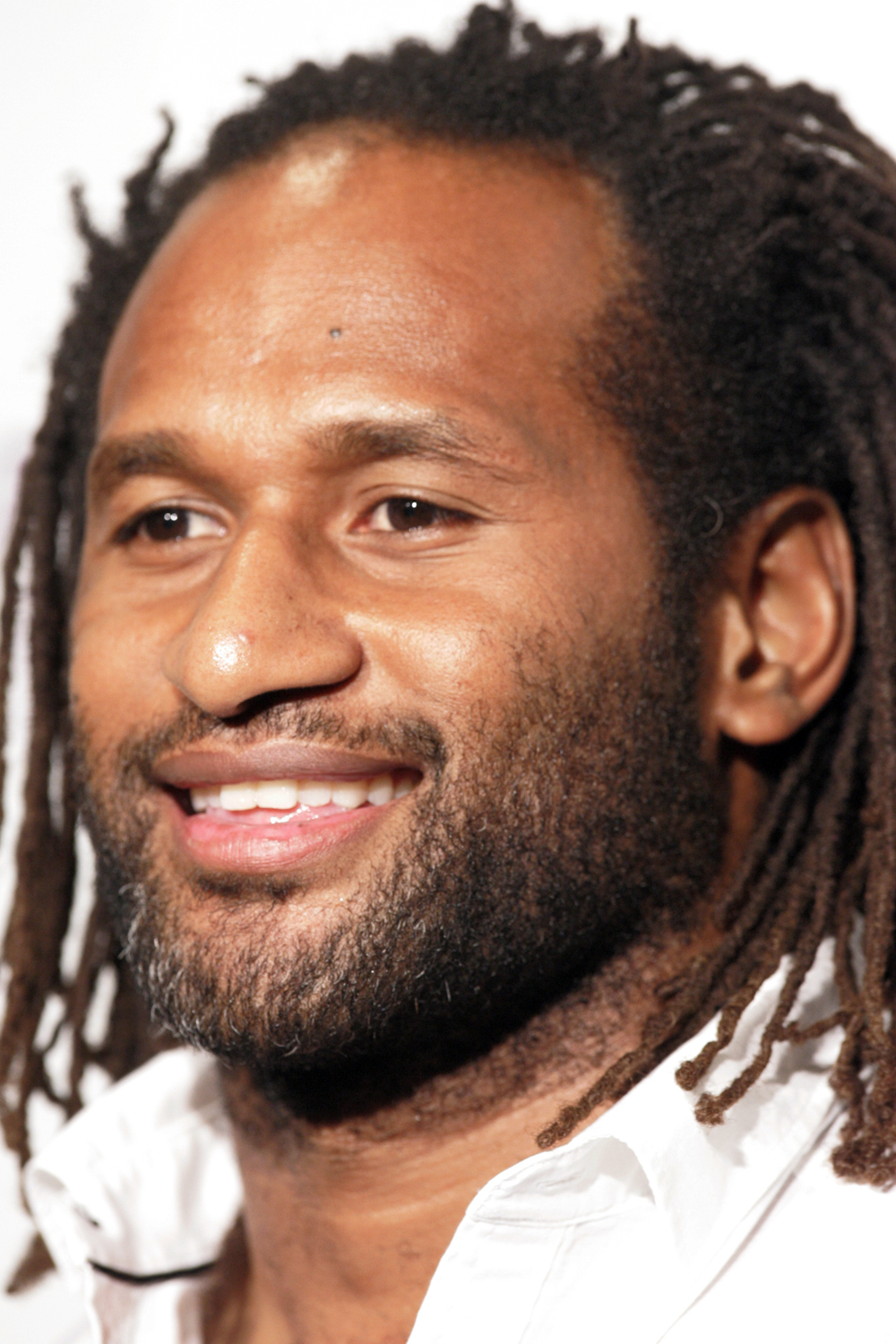
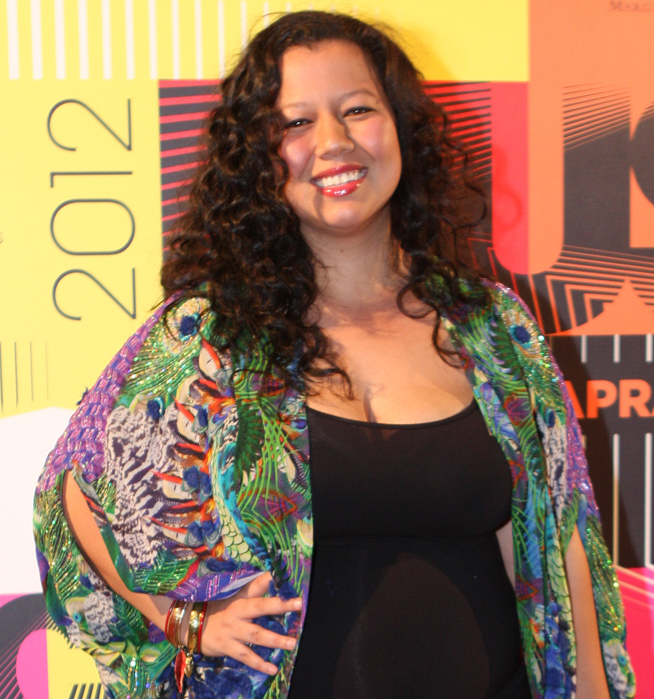
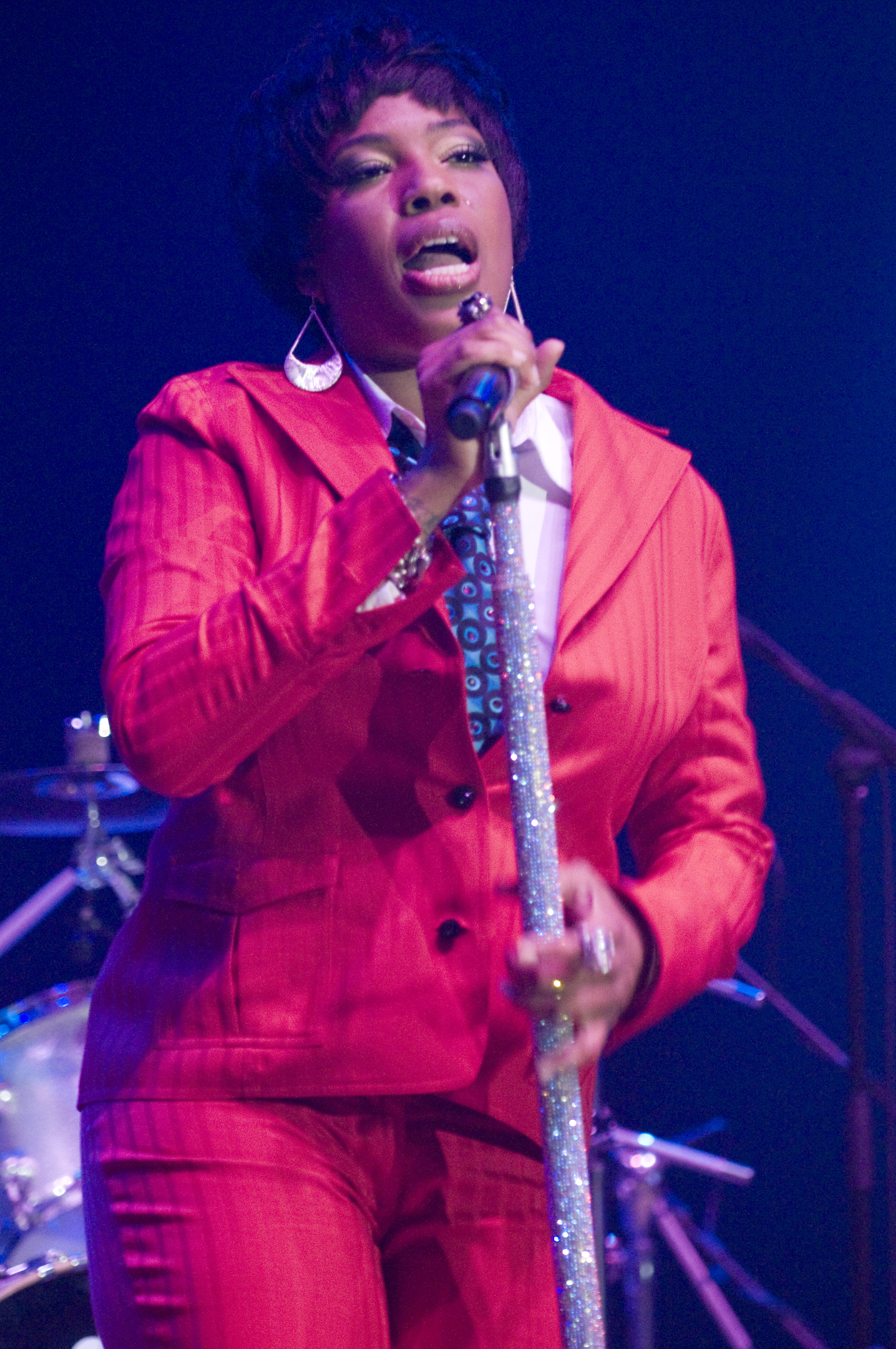
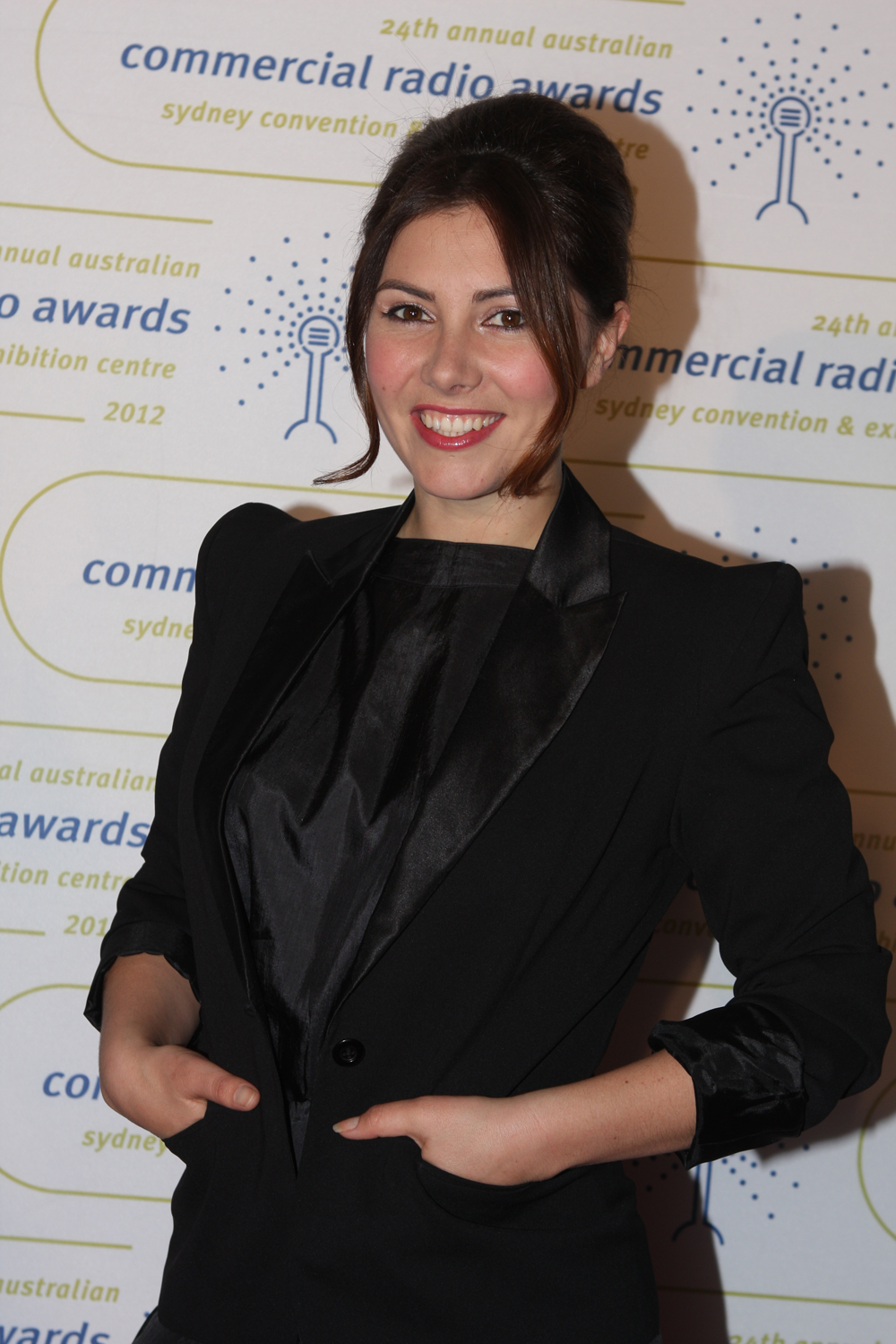
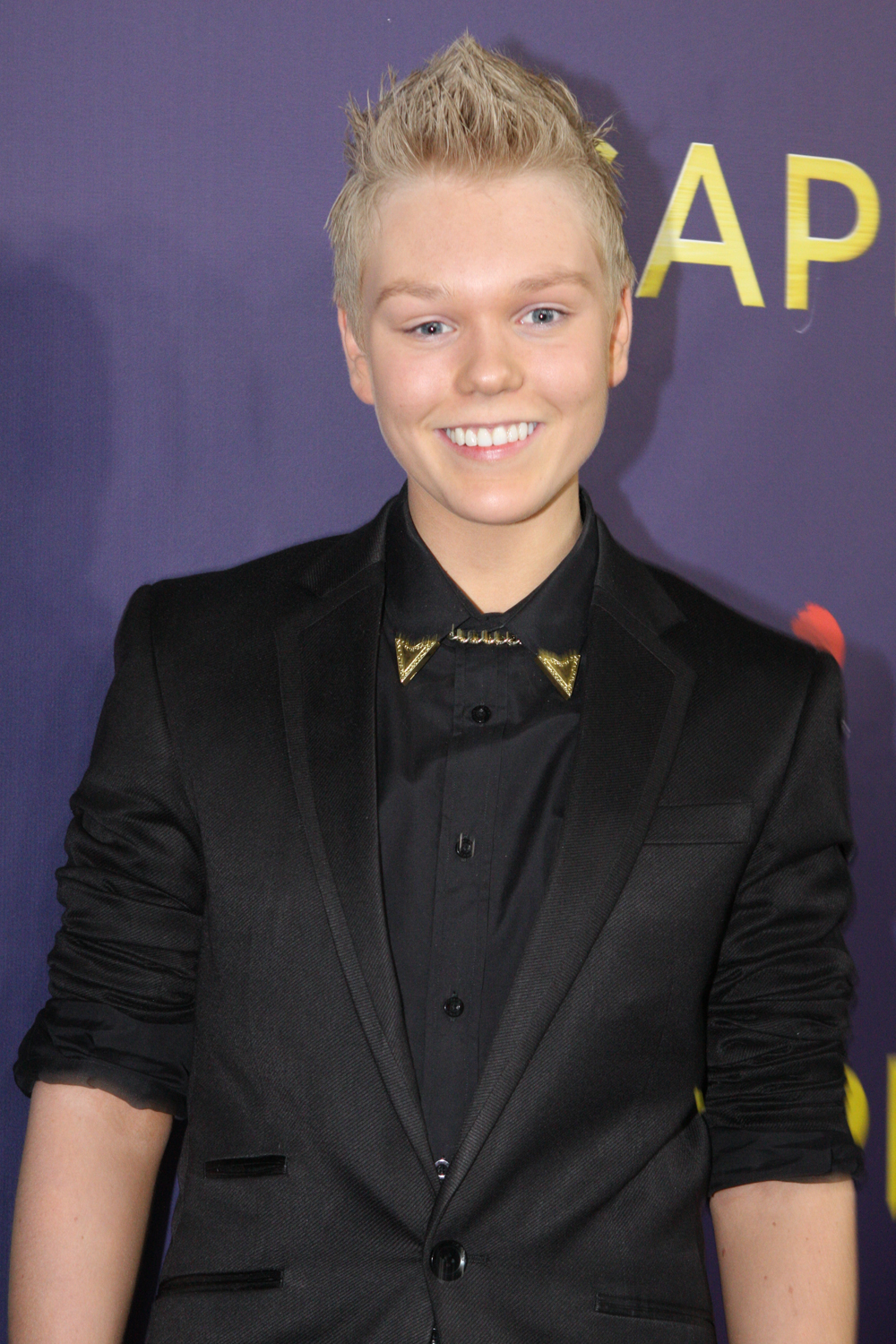
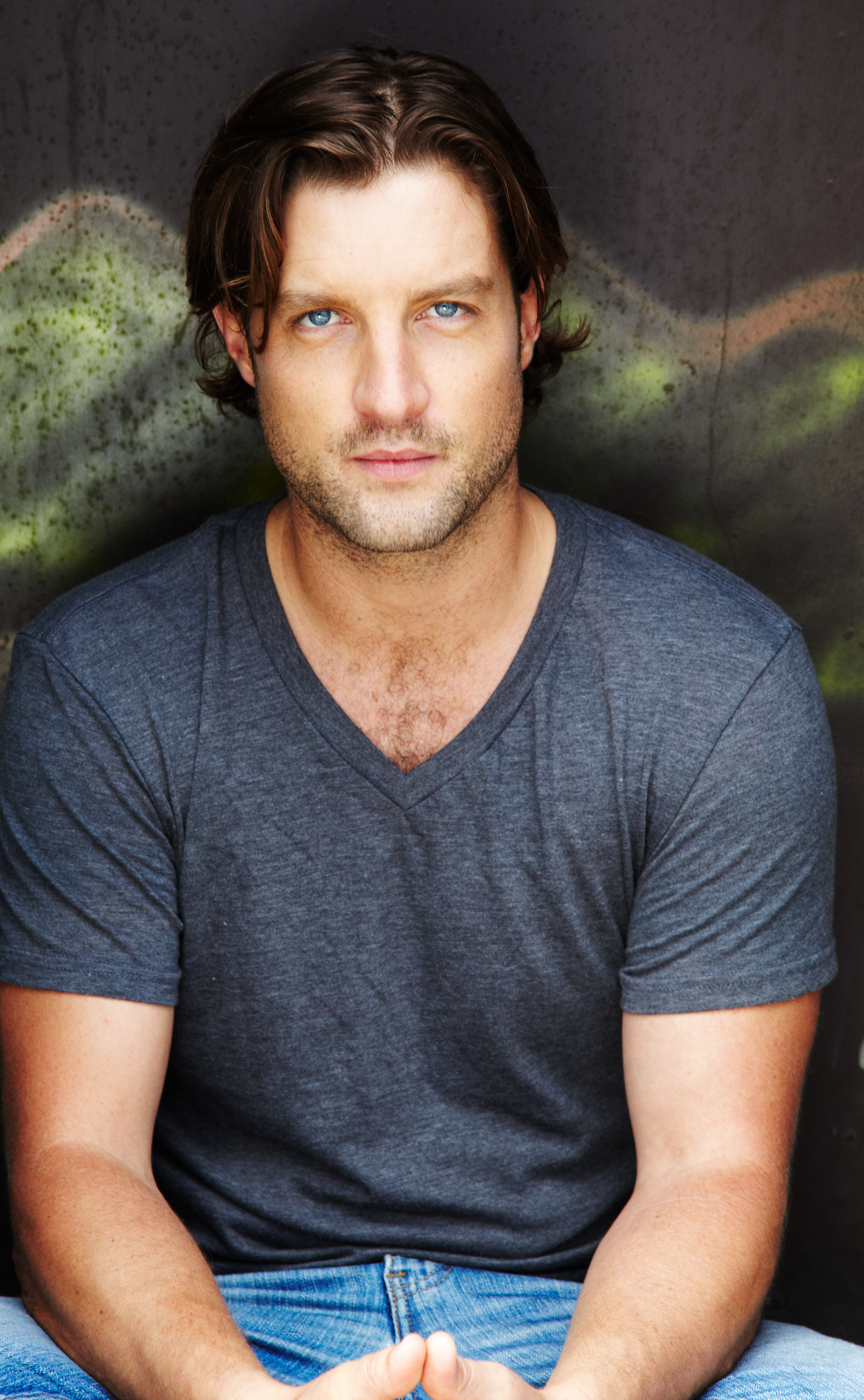
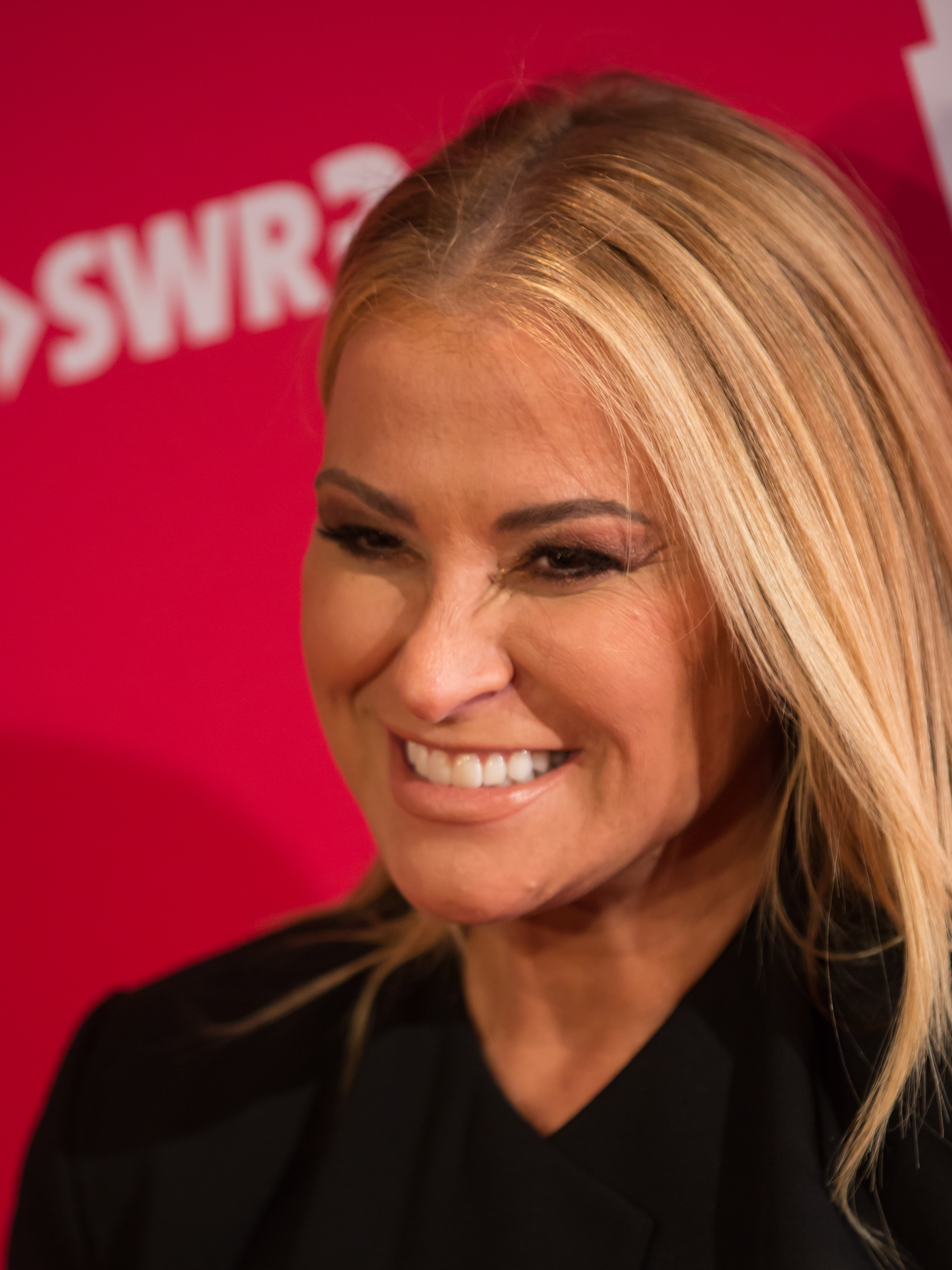
The celebrities who competed in the third series of The Masked Singer, pictured in order of elimination (l-r):

Vinnie Jones ("Volcano"), George Calombaris ("Duster"), Ben Lee ("Professor"), Lote Tuqiri ("Piñata"), Mahalia Barnes ("Pavlova"), Macy Gray ("Atlantis"), Ella Hooper ("Baby"), Jack Vidgen ("Kebab"), Axle Whitehead ("Mullet") and Anastacia ("Vampire")

Not pictured: Alli Simpson ("Lightning") and Em Rusciano ("Dolly")

== Episodes ==
=== Episode 1 (13 September) ===
Performances on the first episode
| # | Stage name | Song | Identity | Result |
|---|---|---|---|---|
| 1 | Mullet | "Macho Man" by Village People | undislosed | RISK |
| 2 | Pavlova | "Watermelon Sugar" by Harry Styles | undisclosed | WIN |
| 3 | Dolly | "Fly Away" by Tones and I | undisclosed | WIN |
| 4 | Professor | "Dumb Things" by Paul Kelly | undisclosed | RISK |
| 5 | Vampire | "Gangsta's Paradise" by Coolio feat. L.V. | undisclosed | WIN |
| 6 | Volcano | "I'm Gonna Be (500 Miles)" by The Proclaimers | Vinnie Jones | OUT |

=== Episode 2 (14 September) ===
Performances on the second episode
| # | Stage name | Song | Identity | Result |
|---|---|---|---|---|
| 1 | Kebab | "Hot Stuff" by Donna Summer | undisclosed | WIN |
| 2 | Lightning | "Brave" by Sara Bareilles | undisclosed | RISK |
| 3 | Baby | "Bad to the Bone" by George Thorogood and the Destroyers | undisclosed | WIN |
| 4 | Duster | "Shake a Tail Feather" by Ray Charles | George Calombaris | OUT |
| 5 | Atlantis | "Pleasure and Pain" by The Divinyls | undisclosed | RISK |
| 6 | Piñata | "She Bangs" by Ricky Martin | undisclosed | WIN |

=== Episode 3 (19 September) ===
Performances on the third episode
| # | Stage name | Song | Identity | Result |
|---|---|---|---|---|
| 1 | Dolly | "No Scrubs" by TLC | undisclosed | SAFE |
| 2 | Vampire | "Sucker" by The Jonas Brothers | undisclosed | SAFE |
| 3 | Professor | "Kiss from a Rose" by Seal | Ben Lee | OUT |
| 4 | Pavlova | "Cover Me in Sunshine" by Pink and Willow Sage Hart | undisclosed | SAFE |
| 5 | Mullet | "SexyBack" by Justin Timberlake | undisclosed | SAFE |

=== Episode 4 (20 September) ===
Performances on the fourth episode
| # | Stage name | Song | Identity | Result |
|---|---|---|---|---|
| 1 | Piñata | "Party Rock Anthem" by LMFAO | Lote Tuqiri | OUT |
| 2 | Baby | "Me Too" by Meghan Trainor | undisclosed | SAFE |
| 3 | Atlantis | "Only Love Can Hurt Like This" by Paloma Faith | undisclosed | SAFE |
| 4 | Lightning | "Diamonds" by Rihanna | undisclosed | SAFE |
| 5 | Kebab | "The Middle" by Zedd, Maren Morris and Grey | undisclosed | SAFE |

=== Episode 5 (21 September) ===
- Group number: "Dynamite" by BTS

Performances on the fifth episode
| # | Stage name | Song | Identity | Result |
|---|---|---|---|---|
| 1 | Mullet | "(I Can't Get No) Satisfaction" by The Rolling Stones | undisclosed | SAFE |
| 2 | Dolly | "Make You Feel My Love" by Adele | undisclosed | SAFE |
| 3 | Pavlova | "Rise Up" by Andra Day | Mahalia Barnes | OUT |
| 4 | Vampire | "Holding Out for a Hero" by Bonnie Tyler | undisclosed | SAFE |

=== Episode 6 (26 September) ===
- Group number: "Head & Heart" by Joel Corry & MNEK
- Special guest mask performance: "Drops of Jupiter (Tell Me)" by Train performed by Kyle Sandilands as Rubble

Performances on the sixth episode
| # | Stage name | Song | Identity | Result |
|---|---|---|---|---|
| 1 | Lightning | "Boom Clap" by Charli XCX | undisclosed | SAFE |
| 2 | Kebab | "Stay with Me" by Sam Smith | undisclosed | SAFE |
| 3 | Atlantis | "Ex's & Oh's" by Elle King | Macy Gray | OUT |
| 4 | Baby | "My Favorite Things" by Julie Andrews | undisclosed | SAFE |

=== Episode 7 (27 September) ===
Performances on the seventh episode
| # | Stage name | Song | Identity | Result |
|---|---|---|---|---|
| 1 | Dolly | "It's Raining Men" by The Weather Girls | undisclosed | SAFE |
| 2 | Vampire | "Can't Help Falling in Love" by Elvis Presley | undisclosed | SAFE |
| 3 | Baby | "Baby Love" by The Supremes | undisclosed | SAFE |
| 4 | Kebab | "Try a Little Tenderness" by Otis Redding | undisclosed | SAFE |
| 5 | Lightning | "Fight Song" by Rachel Platten | Alli Simpson | OUT |
| 6 | Mullet | "Cake by the Ocean" by DNCE | undisclosed | SAFE |

=== Episode 8 (28 September) ===
Performances on the eighth episode
| # | Stage name | Song | Identity | Result |
|---|---|---|---|---|
| 1 | Kebab | "Believe" by Cher | undisclosed | SAFE |
| 2 | Baby | "As Long As You Love Me" by Backstreet Boys | Ella Hooper | OUT |
| 3 | Vampire | "Cheap Thrills" by Sia | undisclosed | SAFE |
| 4 | Dolly | "Supalonely" by Benee feat. Gus Dapperton | undisclosed | SAFE |
| 5 | Mullet | "Baby, I Love Your Way" by Peter Frampton | undisclosed | SAFE |

=== Episode 10 (4 October) ===
- Group number: "Only Human" by The Jonas Brothers

Performances on the tenth episode
| # | Stage name | Song | Identity | Result |
|---|---|---|---|---|
| 1 | Mullet | "Blame It on Me" by George Ezra | undisclosed | SAFE |
| 2 | Vampire | "Fancy" by Iggy Azalea feat. Charli XCX | undisclosed | SAFE |
| 3 | Dolly | "I Can't Make You Love Me" by Bonnie Raitt | undisclosed | SAFE |
| 4 | Kebab | "Juice" by Lizzo | Jack Vidgen | OUT |

=== Episode 11 (5 October) ===
- Group number: "On a Night Like This" by Kylie Minogue

Performances on the eleventh episode
| # | Stage name | Song | Identity | Result |
|---|---|---|---|---|
| 1 | Mullet | "Born to Be Wild" by Steppenwolf | Axle Whitehead | THIRD |
| 2 | Dolly | "You've Got the Love" by Florence + The Machine | Em Rusciano | RUNNER-UP |
| 3 | Vampire | "Live and Let Die" by Wings | Anastacia | WINNER |

== Reception ==
=== Ratings ===
| No. | Title | Air date | Timeslot | Overnight ratings | | Consolidated ratings | | Total viewers | Ref(s) |
| No. | Title | Air date | Timeslot | Viewers | Rank | Viewers | Rank | Total viewers | Ref(s) |
|---|---|---|---|---|---|---|---|---|---|
| 1 | Episode 1 Mask Reveal | 13 September 2021 | Monday 7:30 pm | 642,000 760,000 | 11 8 | 67,000 N/A | 4 N/A | 709,000 N/A | |
| 2 | Episode 2 Mask Reveal | 14 September 2021 | Tuesday 7:30 pm | 592,000 676,000 | 11 8 | 54,000 40,000 | 4 5 | 646,000 716,000 | |
| 3 | Episode 3 Mask Reveal | 19 September 2021 | Sunday 7:30 pm | 494,000 584,000 | 8 7 | 41,000 43,000 | 6 4 | 535,000 627,000 | |
| 4 | Episode 4 Mask Reveal | 20 September 2021 | Monday 7:30 pm | 567,000 703,000 | 14 9 | 49,000 64,000 | 8 5 | 616,000 767,000 | |
| 5 | Episode 5 Mask Reveal | 21 September 2021 | Tuesday 7:30 pm | 573,000 654,000 | 12 8 | 65,000 77,000 | 3 2 | 638,000 731,000 | |
| 6 | Episode 6 Mask Reveal | 26 September 2021 | Sunday 7:30 pm | 581,000 762,000 | 8 4 | 50,000 60,000 | 8 4 | 631,000 822,000 | |
| 7 | Episode 7 Mask Reveal | 27 September 2021 | Monday 7:30 pm | 597,000 719,000 | 15 8 | 31,000 58,000 | 9 4 | 628,000 777,000 | |
| 8 | Episode 8 Mask Reveal | 28 September 2021 | Tuesday 7:30 pm | 545,000 653,000 | 11 8 | 72,000 89,000 | 3 2 | 617,000 742,000 | |
| 9 | The Masked Singer: Exposed! "Road to Grand Finale" | 3 October 2021 | Sunday 7:30 pm | 380,000 | 12 | 19,000 | 8 | 399,000 | |
| 10 | Episode 10 Mask Reveal | 4 October 2021 | Monday 7:30 pm | 575,000 700,000 | 14 8 | 32,000 46,000 | 17 11 | 607,000 746,000 | |
| 11 | Grand Finale The Final Reveal | 5 October 2021 | Tuesday 7:30 pm | 648,000 771,000 | 9 7 | 66,000 64,000 | 11 6 | 714,000 835,000 | |

== See also ==
- List of Australian television series
- The Masked Singer Franchise
- It Takes Two
- Australian Idol
- Australia's Got Talent
