= The Masked Singer (Australian TV series) season 2 =

The Masked Singer
- Season 2
- Presented by: Osher Günsberg
- Judges: Jackie O; Dave Hughes; Dannii Minogue; Urzila Carlson
- No. of contestants: 12
- Winner: Bonnie Anderson as "Bushranger"
- Runner-up: Kate Miller-Heidke as "Queen"
- No. of episodes: 11

Release
- Original network: Network 10
- Original release: 10 August – 14 September 2020

Season chronology
- ← Previous; Season 1 Next → Season 3

The second season of The Masked Singer Australia was renewed in October 2019 and premiered on Monday, 10 August 2020. Osher Günsberg returned as the show's host. In the Grand Finale on 14 September 2020, Bonnie Anderson (as “Bushranger”) was crowned as the winner, Kate Miller-Heidke (as “Queen”) was the runner-up, and Eddie Perfect (as “Frillneck”) placed third.

== Production ==
The costumes were designed and created by Australian Academy Award and BAFTA Award-Winning costume designer Tim Chappel, who is best known for his work on The Adventures of Priscilla, Queen of the Desert with Lizzy Gardiner.

=== Impact of the COVID-19 pandemic ===
As a result of the COVID-19 pandemic, the in studio audience consisted of socially-distanced production staff wearing costumes. Additionally, a small number of Australian viewers that were selected to act as a virtual audience. The virtual audience streamed the live performances online while the show was produced and voted for their favourite character's performances. The performer with the fewest votes by the virtual audience was unmasked in each episode. For confidentiality, the virtual audience did not witness the elimination's result or the unmasking of the performers.

Production of The Masked Singer was suspended on 22 August 2020 after a crew member tested positive to COVID-19, with 16 confirmed cases connected to the show. All production staff, judges and singers were placed in self-isolation. All episodes of the show except for the grand finale had been filmed prior to the production's suspension, with the finale having been scheduled to film within hours of the shut down.

== Panellists and host ==
Season 2 panellists and host

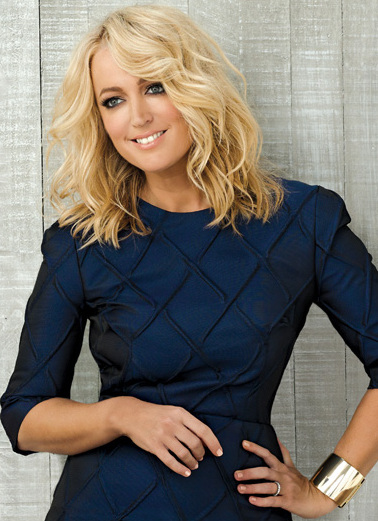
Jackie O

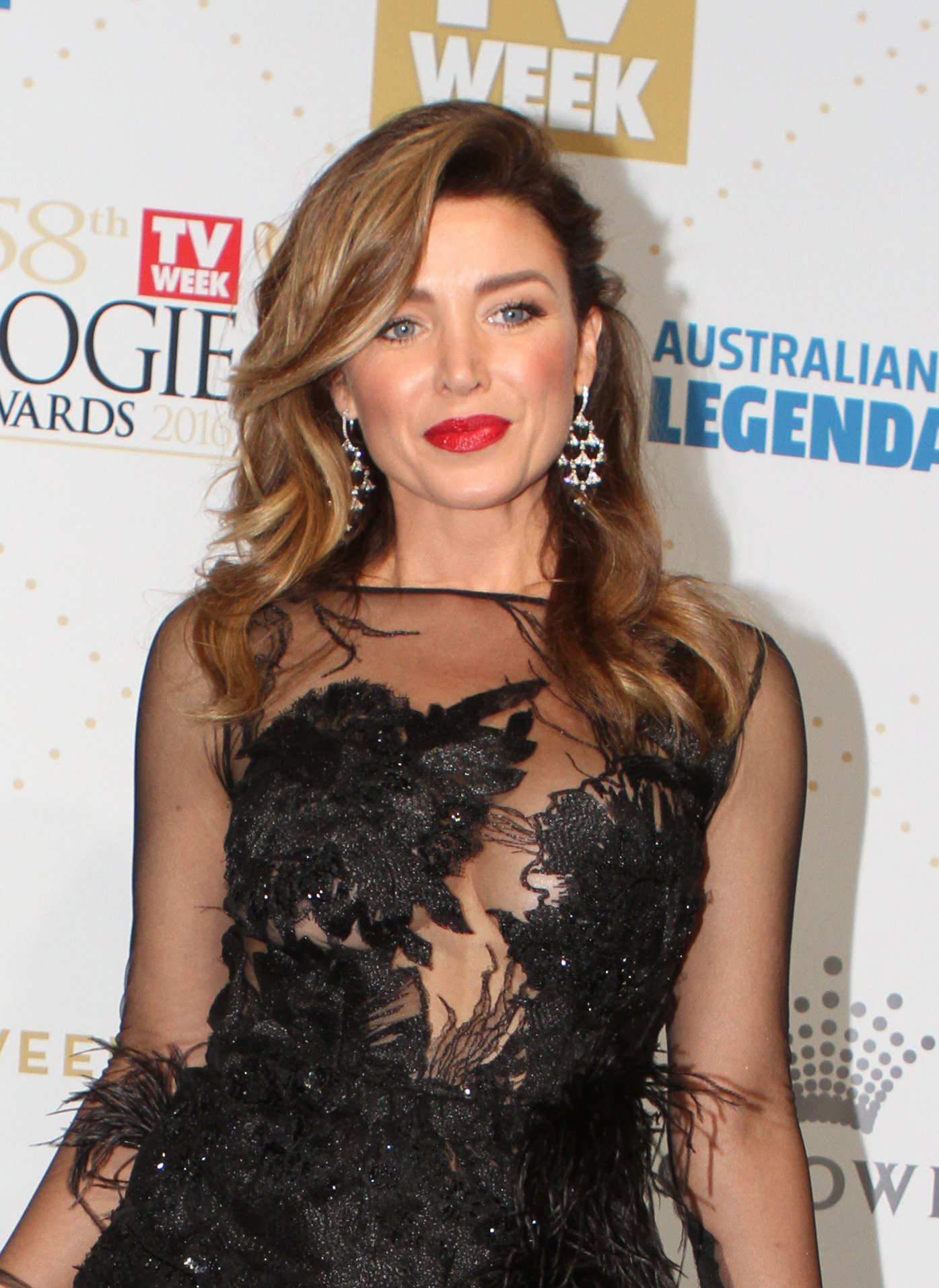
Dannii Minogue

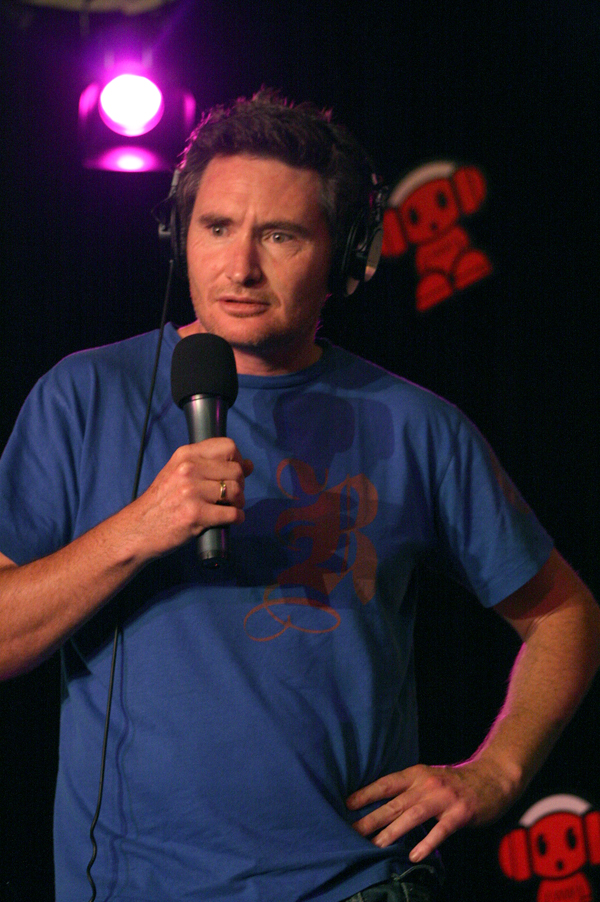
Dave Hughes

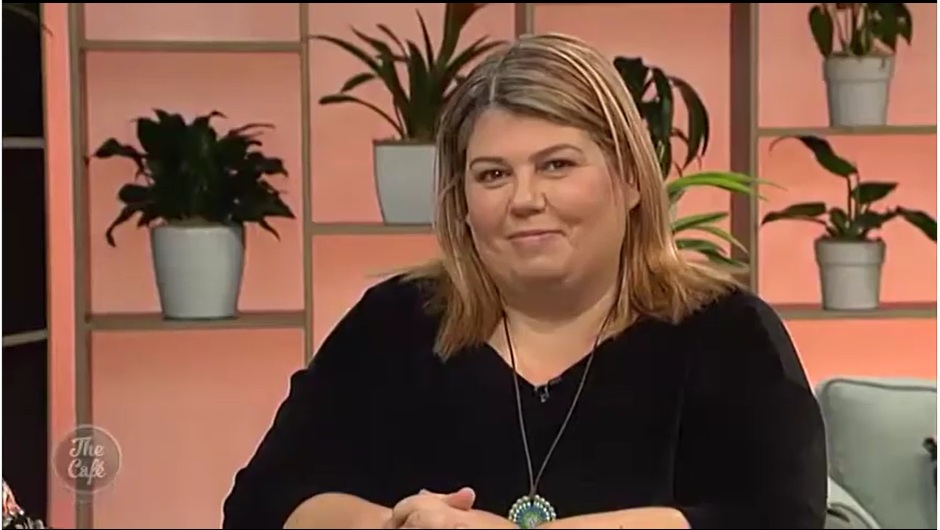
Urzila Carlson

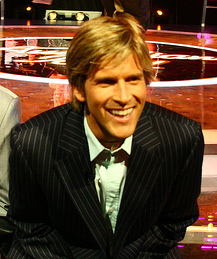
Osher Günsberg

Lindsay Lohan did not return to the judging panel due to the COVID-19 pandemic and Australia's travel restrictions. She was replaced by a new panellist, comedian Urzila Carlson.

The returning judging panel consisted of radio personality Jackie O, singer-songwriter Dannii Minogue and comedian Dave Hughes. Osher Günsberg returned to host the show.

== Contestants ==
In the second season, there were 12 contestants who competed in the competition. Before the season began, Network Ten revealed that the cast included Hollywood actors, a "big name" from an Emmy Award winning television series, Logie Award winners, chart-toppers and a triple Olympian who is a top 10 world-ranked athlete. They further revealed the cast amassing a combined 22 platinum records, 11 gold records, 13 ARIA Awards and two World Cups.

Stage name	Celebrity	Occupation	Episodes									
Stage name	Celebrity	Occupation	1	2	3	4	5	6	7	8	9	11
Bushranger	Bonnie Anderson	Singer		WIN		SAFE		SAFE	SAFE	SAFE	SAFE	WINNER
Queen	Kate Miller-Heidke	Singer	WIN		SAFE		SAFE		SAFE	SAFE	SAFE	RUNNER-UP
Frillneck	Eddie Perfect	Singer/comedian	WIN		SAFE		SAFE		SAFE	SAFE	SAFE	THIRD
Puppet	Simon Pryce	Children's Entertainer/Singer	WIN		SAFE		SAFE		SAFE	SAFE	OUT	
Kitten	Julia Morris	Comedian/TV Personality		WIN		SAFE		SAFE	SAFE	OUT		
Cactus	Lucy Durack	Actress		RISK		SAFE		SAFE	OUT			
Wizard	Isaiah Firebrace	Singer		RISK		SAFE		OUT				
Dragonfly	Sophie Monk	Singer/TV Personality	RISK		SAFE		OUT					
Sloth	Katie Noonan	Singer/Composer		WIN		OUT						
Goldfish	Christine Anu	Singer	RISK		OUT							
Hammerhead	Michael Bevan	Cricketer		OUT								
Echidna	Mark Philippoussis	Former Tennis Player	OUT									

The masked singer won their face-off and remained in the competition.
The masked singer lost their face-off, but was not eliminated.
The masked singer was safe from elimination.
The masked singer was eliminated from the competition and unmasked upon their elimination.
The masked singer did not perform.
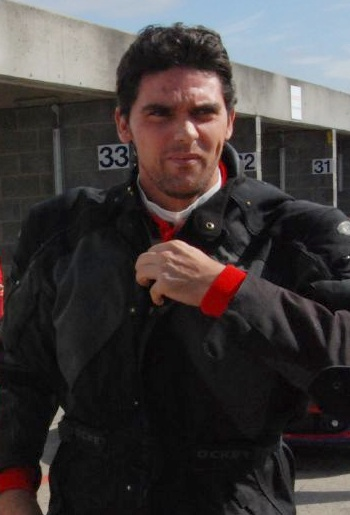
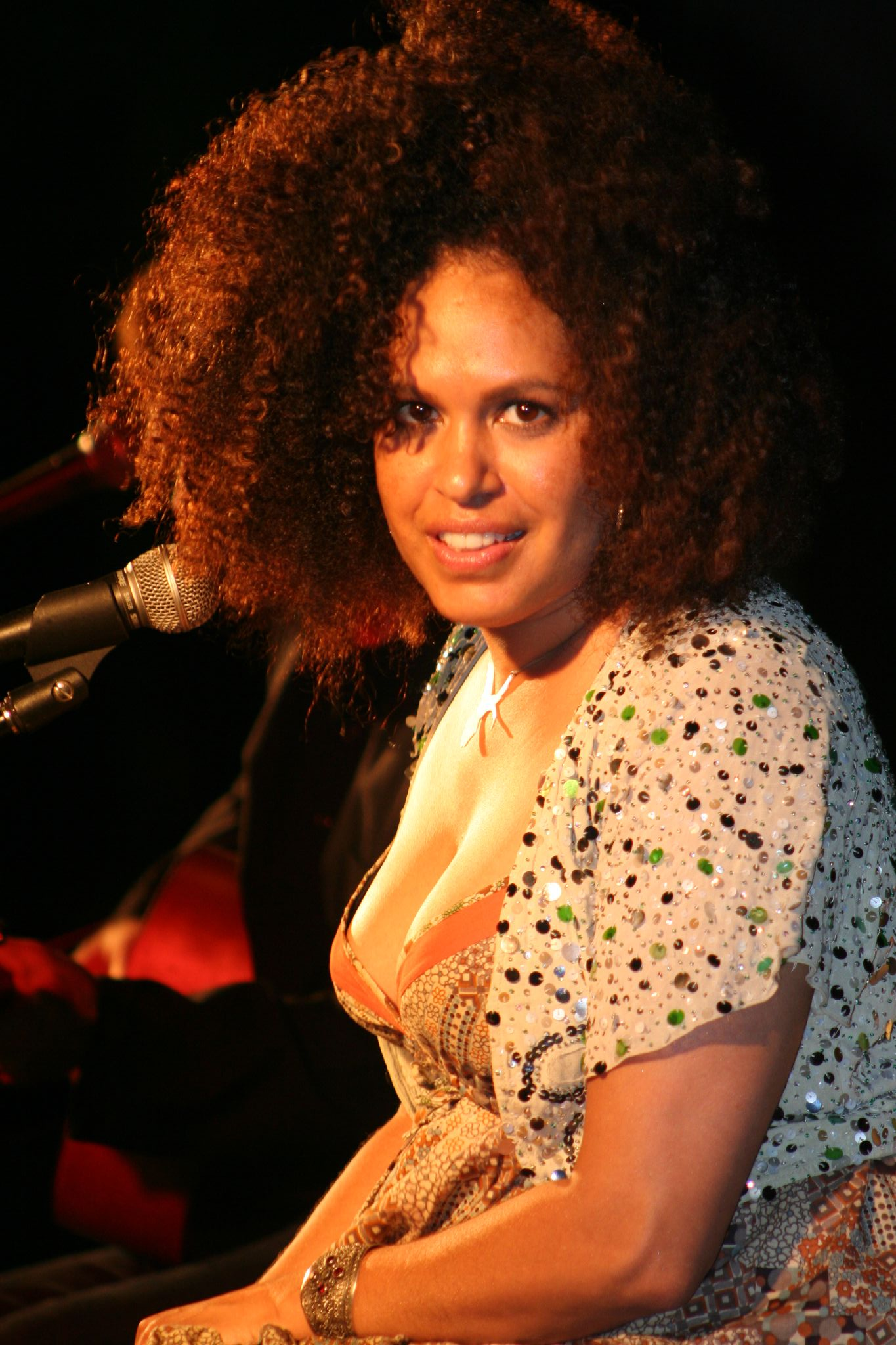
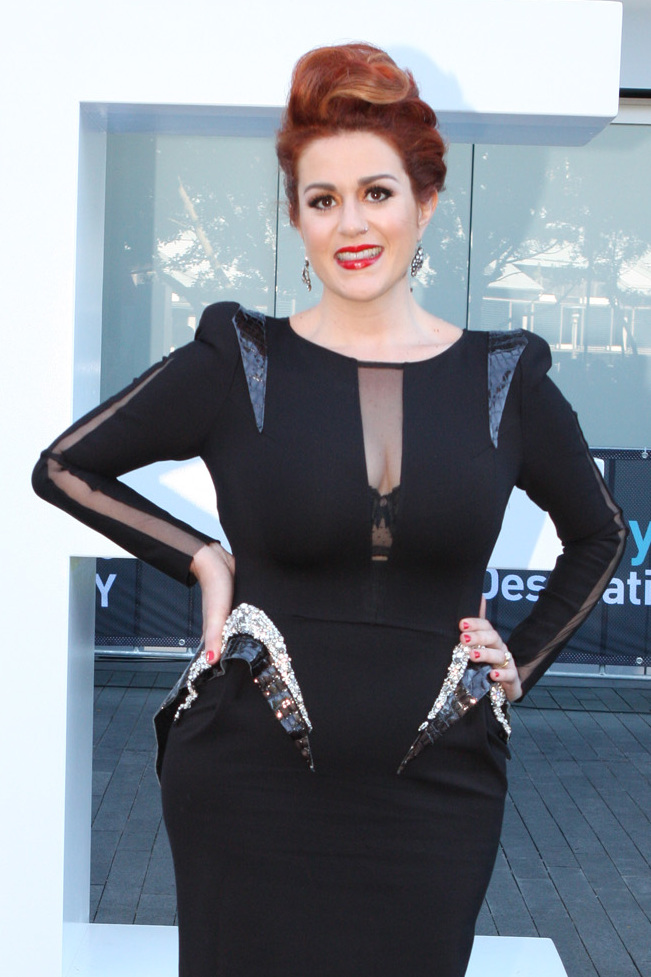
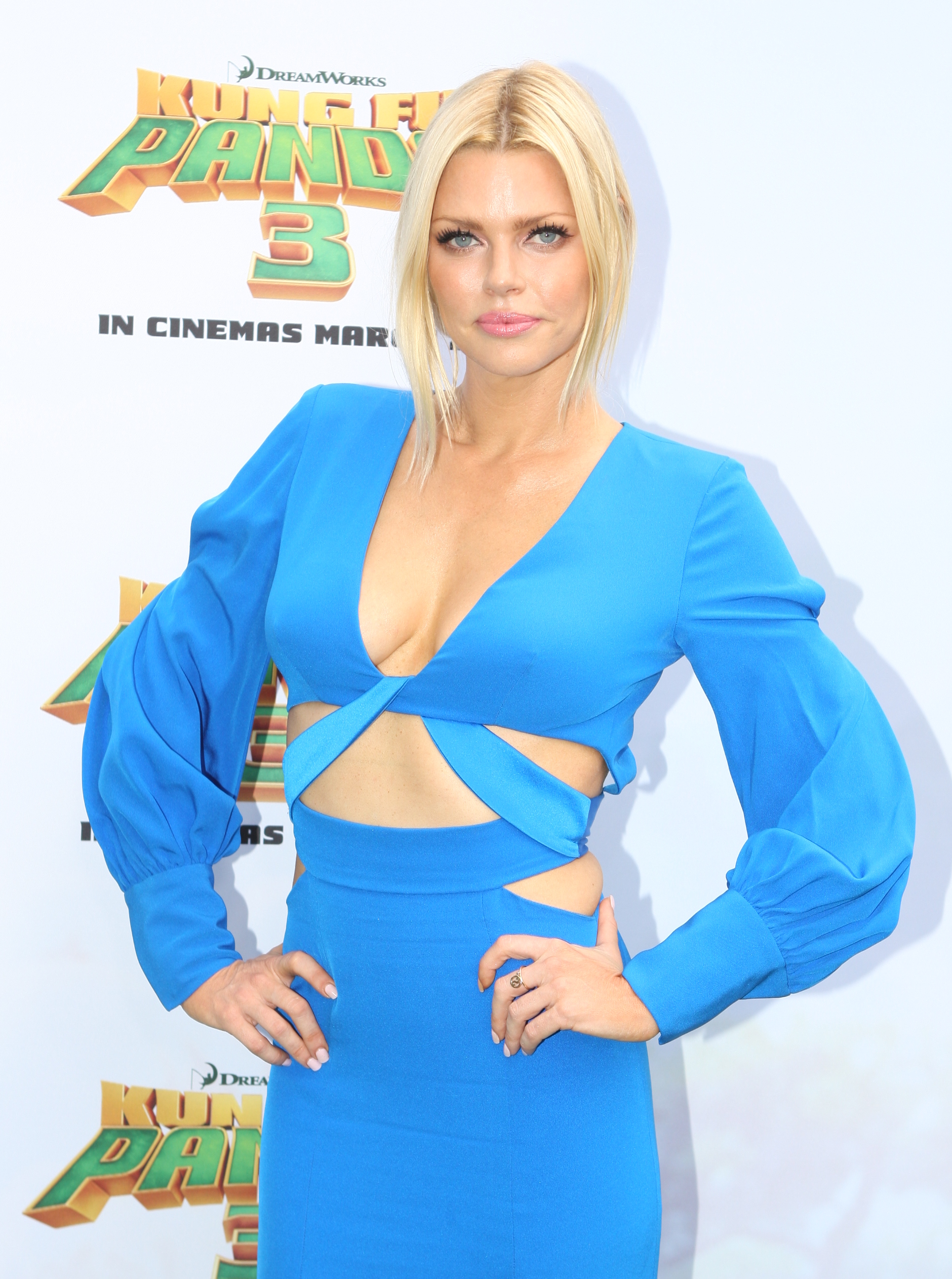
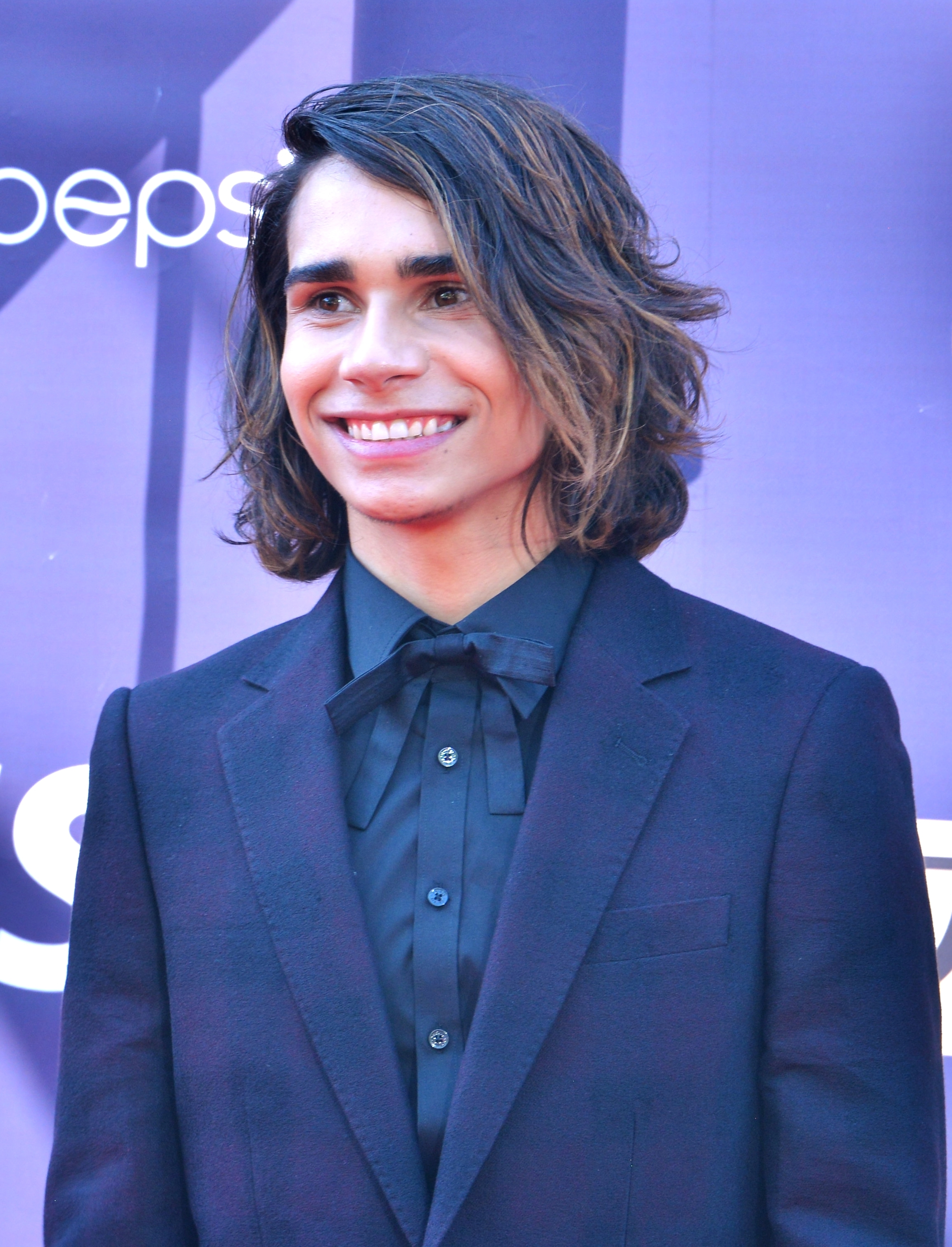
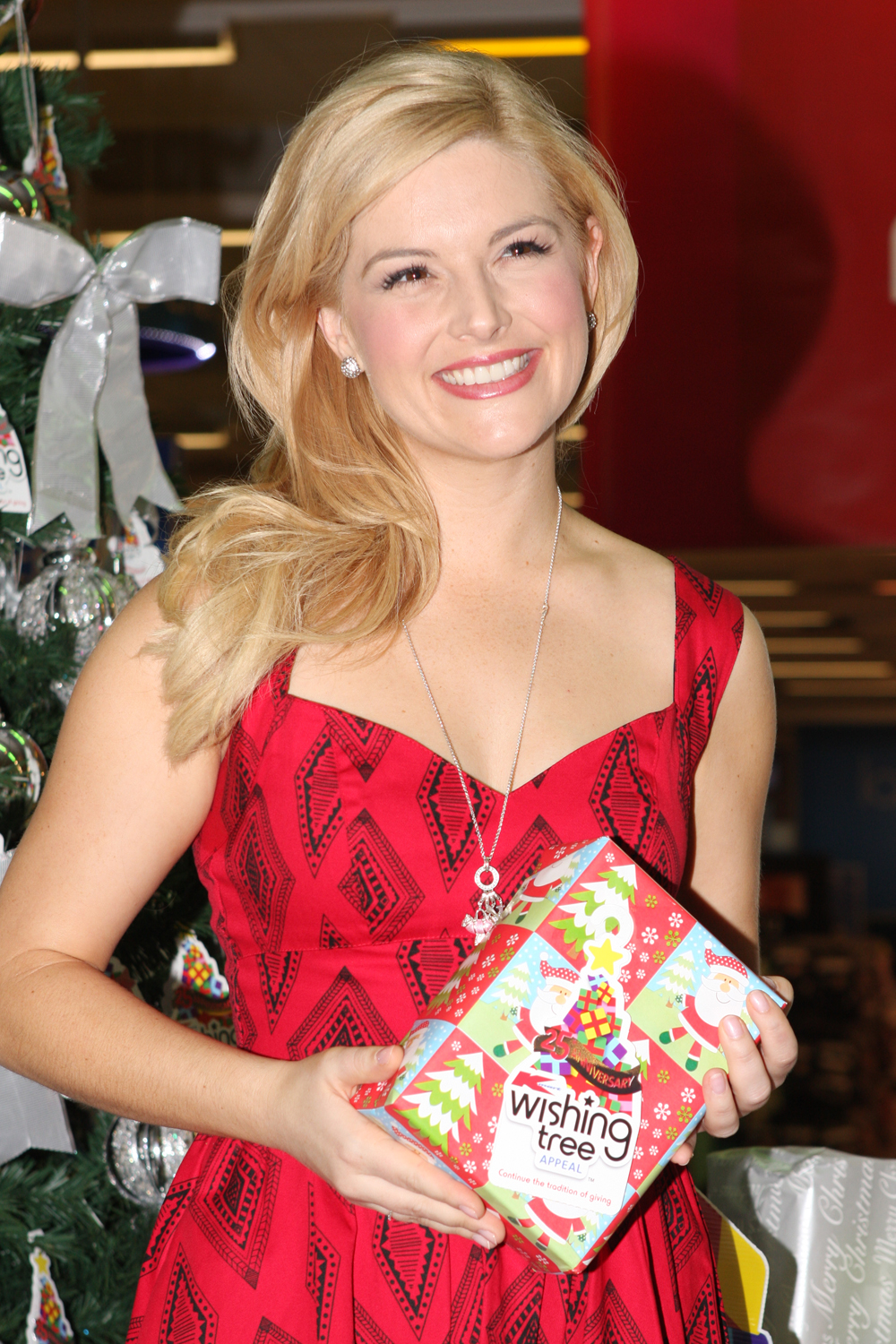
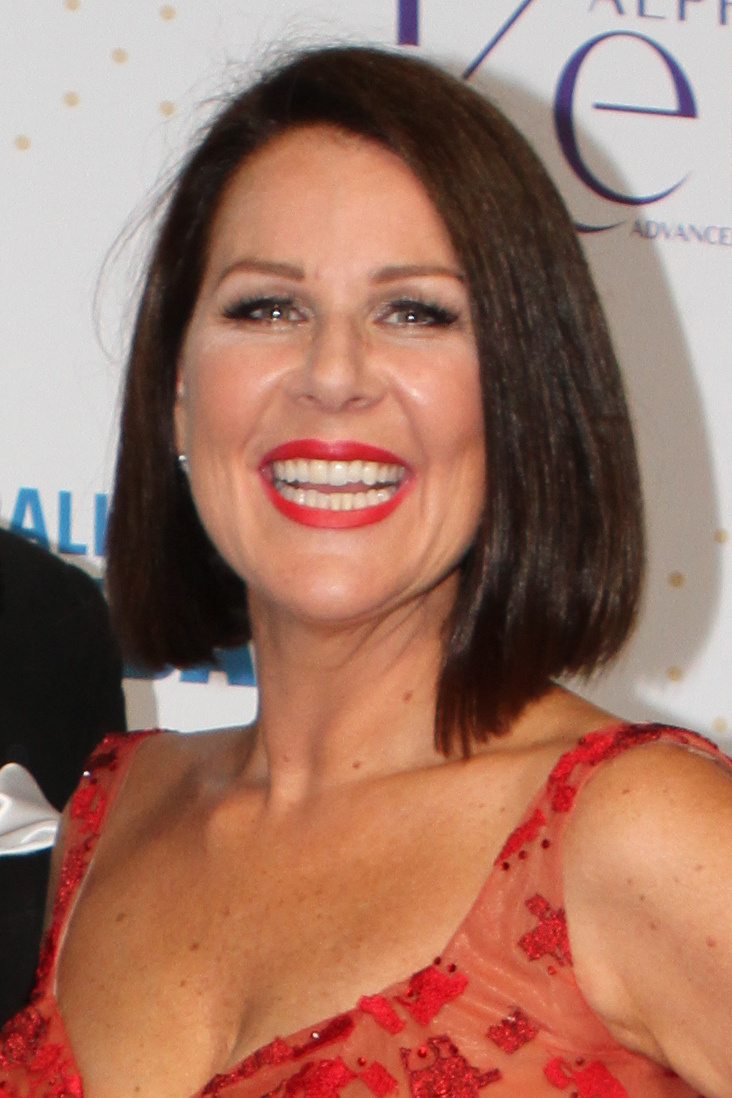
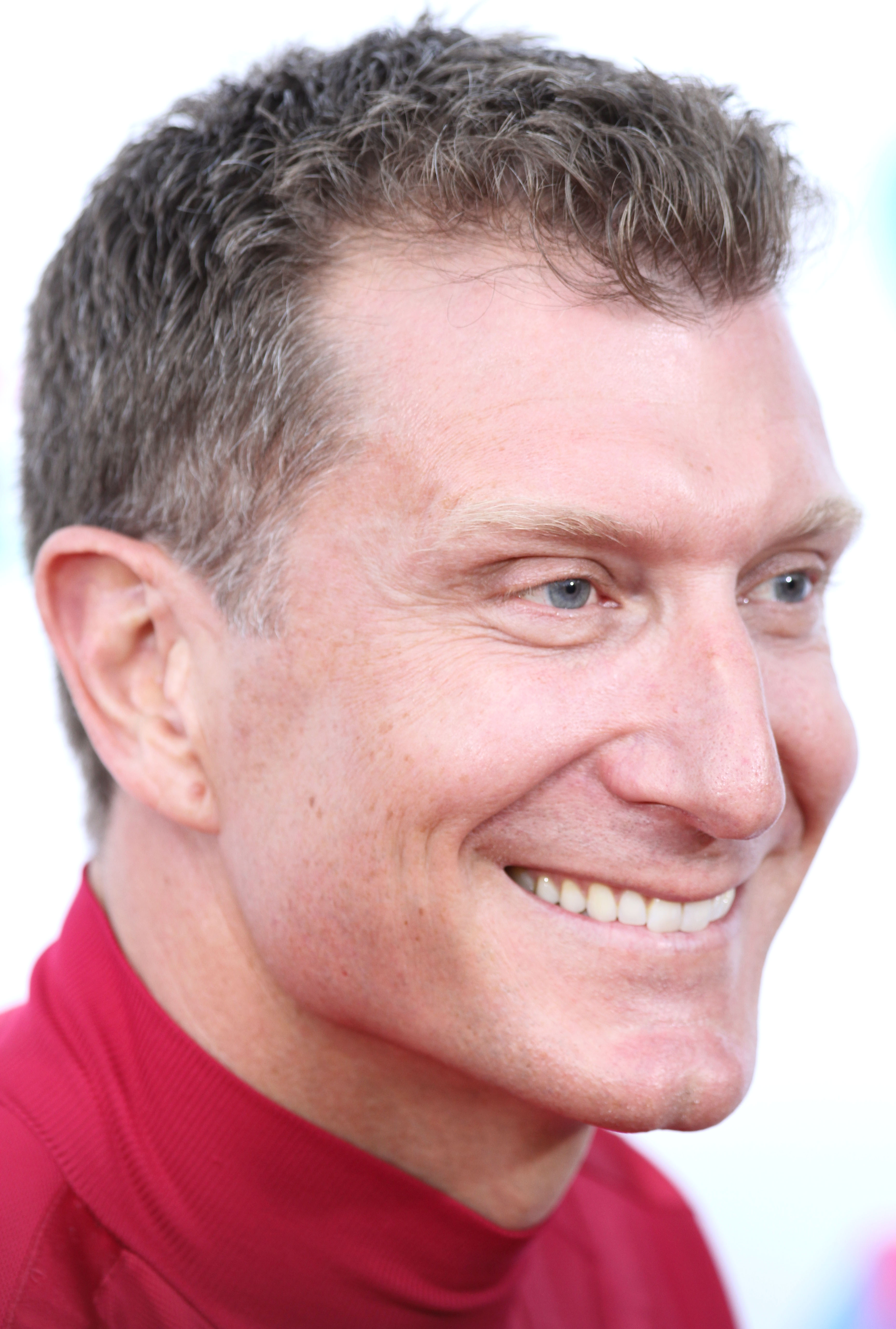
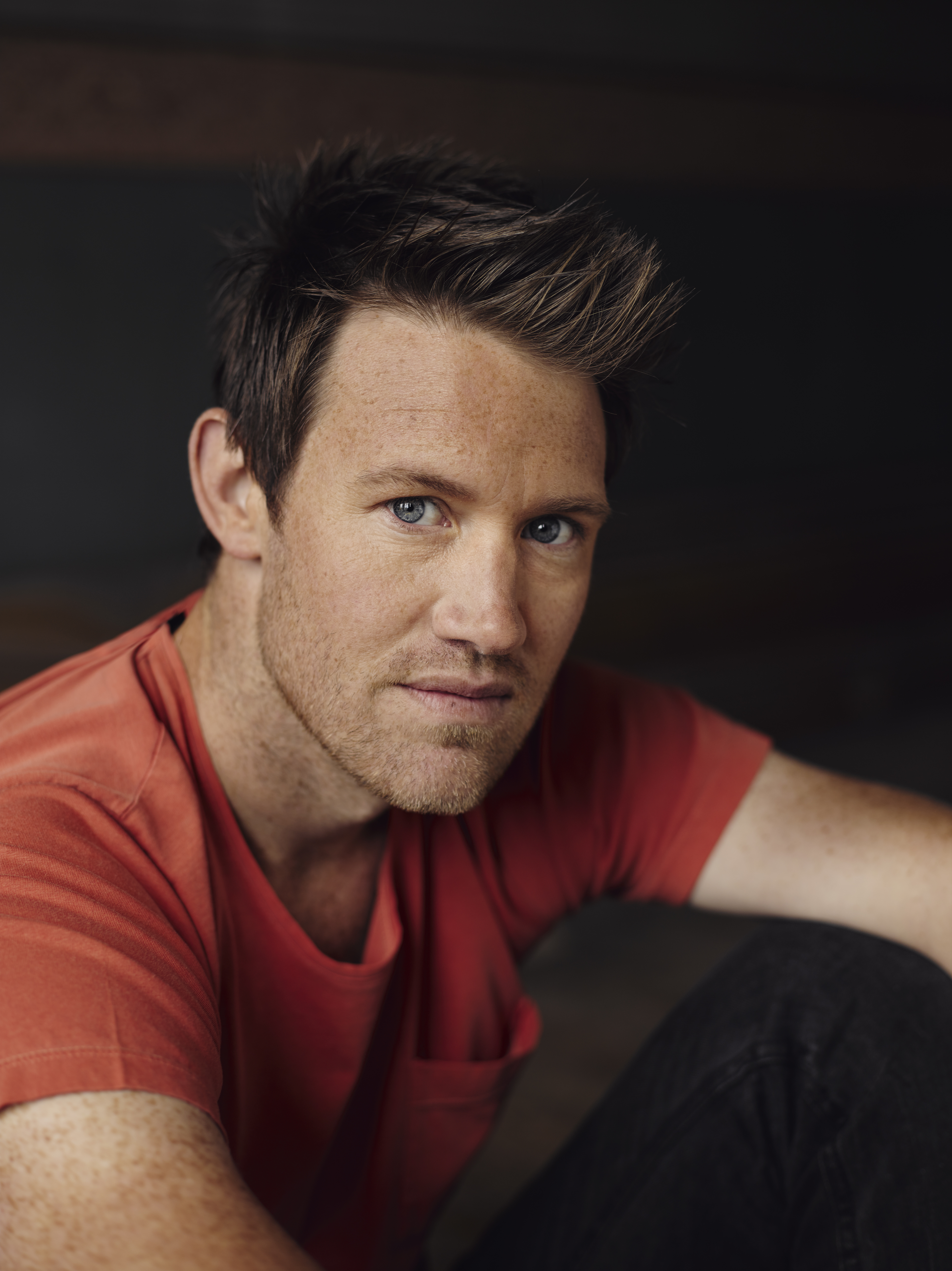
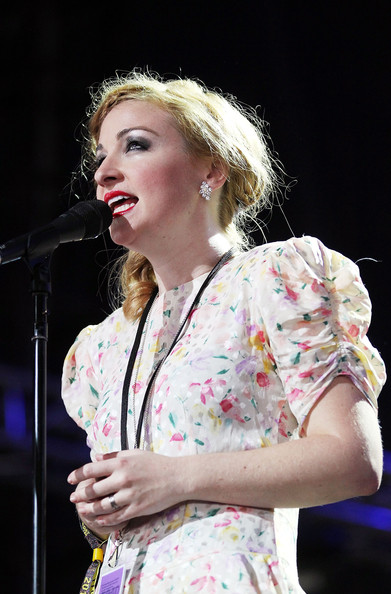
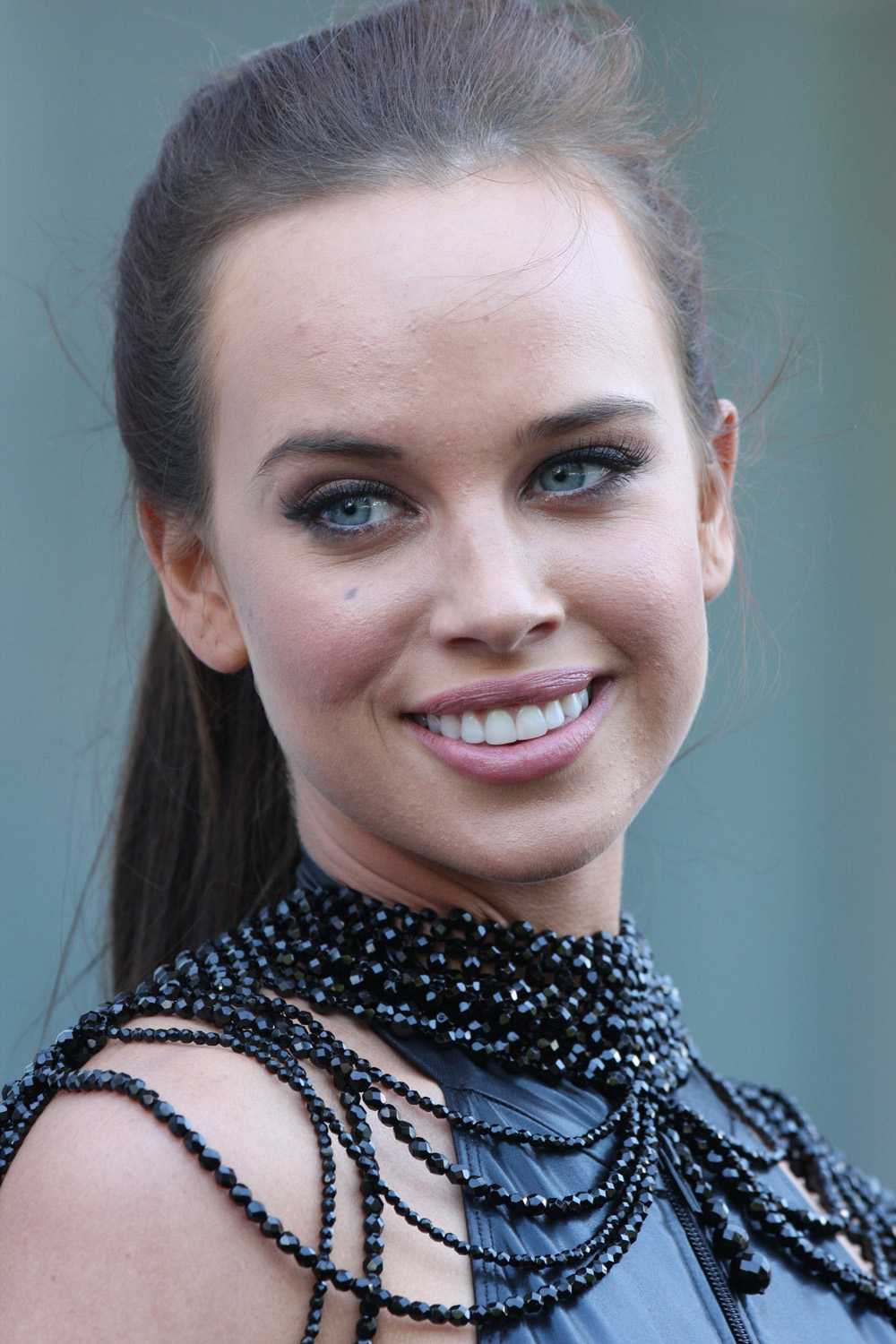
The celebrities who competed in the second season of The Masked Singer Australia, pictured in order of elimination (l-r):

Mark Philippoussis ("Echnida"), Christine Anu ("Goldfish"), Katie Noonan ("Sloth"), Sophie Monk ("Dragonfly"), Isaiah Firebrace ("Wizard"), Lucy Durack ("Cactus"), Julia Morris ("Kitten"), Simon Pryce ("Puppet"), Eddie Perfect ("Frillneck"), Kate Miller-Heidke ("Queen") and Bonnie Anderson ("Bushranger")

Not pictured: Michael Bevan ("Hammerhead")

== Episodes ==
=== Episode 1 (10 August) ===
Performances on the first episode
#	Stage name	Song	Identity	Result
1	Goldfish	"Post Malone" by Sam Feldt	undisclosed	RISK
2	Puppet	"Burning Love" by Elvis Presley	undisclosed	WIN
3	Queen	"Blinding Lights" by The Weeknd	undisclosed	WIN
4	Echidna	"Faith" by George Michael	Mark Philippoussis	OUT
5	Dragonfly	"True Colours" by Cyndi Lauper	undisclosed	RISK
6	Frillneck	"Bang Bang" by Jessie J, Ariana Grande & Nicki Minaj	undisclosed	WIN

=== Episode 2 (11 August) ===
Performances on the second episode
#	Stage name	Song	Identity	Result
1	Sloth	"Good as Hell" by Lizzo	undisclosed	WIN
2	Wizard	"Firework" by Katy Perry	undisclosed	RISK
3	Kitten	"Don't Start Now" by Dua Lipa	undisclosed	WIN
4	Hammerhead	"Working Class Man" by Jimmy Barnes	Michael Bevan	OUT
5	Cactus	"Just A Girl" by No Doubt	undisclosed	RISK
6	Bushranger	"Bills" by LunchMoney Lewis	undisclosed	WIN

=== Episode 3 (17 August) ===
Performances on the third episode
#	Stage name	Song	Identity	Result
1	Dragonfly	"Dance Monkey" by Tones and I	undisclosed	SAFE
2	Frillneck	"Breaking Me" by Topic & A7S	undisclosed	SAFE
3	Queen	"Paint It Black" by The Rolling Stones	undisclosed	SAFE
4	Goldfish	"It's My Life" by Bon Jovi	Christine Anu	OUT
5	Puppet	"Somebody to Love" by Queen	undisclosed	SAFE

=== Episode 4 (18 August) ===
Performances on the fourth episode
#	Stage name	Song	Identity	Result
1	Bushranger	"Poker Face" by Lady Gaga	undisclosed	SAFE
2	Wizard	"Somebody That I Used To Know" by Gotye feat. Kimbra	undisclosed	SAFE
3	Sloth	"Higher Love" by Kygo feat. Whitney Houston	Katie Noonan	OUT
4	Kitten	"The Day You Went Away" by Wendy Matthews	undisclosed	SAFE
5	Cactus	"I Love It" by Iconia Pop feat. Charli XCX	undisclosed	SAFE

=== Episode 5 (24 August) ===
- Group number: "Can't Stop the Feeling!" by Justin Timberlake

Performances on the fifth episode
#	Stage name	Song	Identity	Result
1	Dragonfly	"Tik Tok" by Kesha	Sophie Monk	OUT
2	Queen	"Diamonds Are a Girl's Best Friend" by Marilyn Monroe	undisclosed	SAFE
3	Frillneck	"Mad World" by Michael Andrews feat. Gary Jules	undisclosed	SAFE
4	Puppet	"Despacito" by Luis Fonsi & Daddy Yankee	undisclosed	SAFE

=== Episode 6 (25 August) ===
- Group number: "Came Here for Love" by Sigala & Ella Eyre

Performances on the sixth episode
#	Stage name	Song	Identity	Result
1	Wizard	"Raise Your Glass" by Pink	Isaiah Firebrace	OUT
2	Bushranger	"Be Alright" by Dean Lewis	undisclosed	SAFE
3	Cactus	"I Touch Myself" by Divinyls	undisclosed	SAFE
4	Kitten	"One Way Or Another" by Blondie	undisclosed	SAFE

=== Episode 7 (31 August) ===
Performances on the seventh episode
#	Stage name	Song	Identity	Result
1	Frillneck	"Land of 1000 Dances" by Wilson Pickett	undisclosed	SAFE
2	Bushranger	"Motivation" by Normani	undisclosed	SAFE
3	Cactus	"Total Eclipse of the Heart" by Bonnie Tyler	Lucy Durack	OUT
4	Queen	"Shake It Off" by Taylor Swift	undisclosed	SAFE
5	Puppet	"Thinking Out Loud" by Ed Sheeran	undisclosed	SAFE
6	Kitten	"All The Small Things" by Blink-182	undisclosed	SAFE

=== Episode 8 (1 September) ===
Performances on the eighth episode
#	Stage name	Song	Identity	Result
1	Puppet	"Take On Me" by A-ha	undisclosed	SAFE
2	Queen	"Lose You to Love Me" by Selena Gomez	undisclosed	SAFE
3	Kitten	"You Don't Own Me" by Lesley Gore	Julia Morris	OUT
4	Bushranger	"Need You Now" by Lady A	undisclosed	SAFE
5	Frillneck	"Can't Hold Us" by Macklemore & Ryan Lewis	undisclosed	SAFE

=== Episode 9 (7 September) ===
- Group number: "This City" by Sam Fischer

Performances on the ninth episode
#	Stage name	Song	Identity	Result
1	Puppet	"Livin' la Vida Loca" by Ricky Martin	Simon Pryce	OUT
2	Frillneck	"Don't Dream It's Over" by Crowded House	undisclosed	SAFE
3	Bushranger	"One Last Time" by Ariana Grande	undisclosed	SAFE
4	Queen	"Dancing on My Own" by Robyn	undisclosed	SAFE

=== Episode 11 (14 September) — Finale ===
- Because of COVID-19 shutdown, the judges had to be in different states, with Dannii and Dave in-studio in Melbourne, Jackie in Sydney alongside Osher and Urzila in New Zealand.
- Group number: "Together" by Sia

Performances on the eleventh episode
#	Stage name	Song	Identity	Result
1	Frillneck	"Devil Inside" by INXS	Eddie Perfect	THIRD
2	Queen	"I Will Survive" by Gloria Gaynor	Kate Miller-Heidke	RUNNER UP
3	Bushranger	"When Love Takes Over" by David Guetta & Kelly Rowland	Bonnie Anderson	WINNER

== Reception ==
=== Ratings ===
No.	Title	Air date	Timeslot	Overnight ratings		Consolidated ratings		Total viewers	Ref(s)
No.	Title	Air date	Timeslot	Viewers	Rank	Viewers	Rank	Total viewers	Ref(s)
1	Episode 1 Mask Reveal	10 August 2020	Monday 7:30 pm	733,000 823,000	10 7	75,000 77,000	9 7	808,000 900,000	
2	Episode 2 Mask Reveal	11 August 2020	Tuesday 7:30 pm	818,000 942,000	6 5	132,000 117,000	6 2	950,000 1,059,000	
3	Episode 3 Mask Reveal	17 August 2020	Monday 7:30 pm	767,000 929,000	8 5	85,000 79,000	6 4	852,000 1,008,000	
4	Episode 4 Mask Reveal	18 August 2020	Tuesday 7:30 pm	806,000 916,000	6 5	87,000 91,000	6 5	893,000 1,007,000	
5	Episode 5 Mask Reveal	24 August 2020	Monday 7:30 pm	692,000 786,000	11 7	61,000 106,000	10 6	753,000 892,000	
6	Episode 6 Mask Reveal	25 August 2020	Tuesday 7:30 pm	717,000 810,000	9 6	86,000 86,000	8 5	803,000 896,000	
7	Episode 7 Mask Reveal	31 August 2020	Monday 7:30 pm	729,000 938,000	10 5	66,000 73,000	8 5	795,000 1,011,000	
8	Episode 8 Mask Reveal	1 September 2020	Tuesday 7:30 pm	681,000 797,000	10 5	106,000 131,000	7 5	787,000 928,000	
9	Episode 9 Mask Reveal	7 September 2020	Monday 7:30 pm	775,000 918,000	7 5	46,000 51,000	8 5	821,000 963,000	
10	The Masked Singer: Unmasked "Road to Grand Finale"	8 September 2020	Tuesday 7:30 pm	592,000	9	25,000	11	618,000	
11	Grand Finale The Final Reveal	14 September 2020	Monday 7:30 pm	1,000,000 1,191,000	6 1	47,000 46,000	3 1	1,047,000 1,237,000	

== See also ==
- List of Australian television series
- The Masked Singer Franchise
- It Takes Two
- Australian Idol
- Australia's Got Talent
