= The Masked Singer (Australian TV series) =

Australian reality television show

- Also known as: The Masked Singer Australia
- Genre: Reality television; Game show
- Based on: King of Mask Singer by Munhwa Broadcasting Corporation
- Written by: Rowan McGillicuddy; Michael Chamberlin; Ben Jenkins
- Directed by: Peter Ots
- Creative directors: David Kurt; Chris Edmunds; Antony Ginandjar; Ashley Evans
- Presented by: Osher Günsberg
- Starring: Jackie O; Dave Hughes; Dannii Minogue; Lindsay Lohan; Urzila Carlson; Mel B; Abbie Chatfield; Chrissie Swan
- Opening theme: "Who Are You" by The Who
- Composer: Dorian West
- Country of origin: Australia
- Original language: English
- No. of seasons: 5
- No. of episodes: 55

Production
- Executive producers: Sean Kneale; Karen Greene; Janine Cooper; Cathie Scott; Stephen Tate; Shaun Murphy; Tamara Simoneau
- Producers: Dan Sheldon; Rowan McGillicuddy; Ben Jenkins; Gavin Jarrett; Daniel Colless
- Camera setup: Multi-camera
- Running time: 45–50 minutes
- Production company: Warner Bros. International Television

Original release
- Network: Network 10
- Release: 23 September 2019 – 7 November 2023

The Masked Singer Australia is an Australian reality television singing competition show which was hosted by Osher Günsberg, that premiered on Network 10 on 23 September 2019. It is based on the international music game show franchise format Masked Singer which originated from the South Korean television program King of Mask Singer. The show was recorded at Disney Studios Australia, formerly called Fox Studios Australia.

Although the series was renewed for a sixth season in October 2023, which was set to air in 2024, the series was later cancelled by Ten in May 2024.

== Production ==
In March 2019, TV Blackbox shared leaked news that Network 10 would be producing a local series of the franchise. The news was officially announced in May 2019 at the network's upfronts. In June 2019, it was revealed that Osher Gunsberg would be the host of the series. On 15 July 2019, it was revealed that American actress Lindsay Lohan would join the show as a panellist. Australian singer Dannii Minogue, comedian Dave Hughes and radio presenter Jackie O were also announced alongside Lohan.

At the network's upfronts in October 2019, it was announced that the series had been renewed for a second season. In April 2020, it was reported that the COVID-19 pandemic would force pre-production of the second season to be delayed so filming was postponed from late July to early August 2020. Lindsay Lohan was also unable to fly to Melbourne to take part in the program and was replaced by new panellist, comedian Urzila Carlson.

In October 2020, it was announced that the series had been renewed for a third season, which premiered on 13 September 2021.

On 20 October 2021, it was announced that the series would return with a new season that aired in 2022, with Jackie O, Minogue, and Carlson all not returning. Mel B, Abbie Chatfield, and Chrissie Swan joined the panel as their replacements.

In February 2023, Swan announced that the show would be returning for a fifth season, which aired in late 2023.

=== Security ===
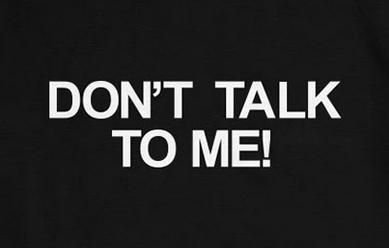
The front of the oversized sweatshirts celebrities wear on set while offstage to prevent their voices from being heard.

The show has an 'extreme security protocol' in effect both during and after filming to protect the celebrity's identities from leaking, with host Günsberg stating that the show "was beyond any kind of security I've been exposed to." Everyone involved in the show signed a non-disclosure agreement which prevented anyone from revealing any information about the shooting dates, costumes or identities of the masks episode until its broadcast. The celebrities who appear on the show are only allowed to inform their spouse about their participation, who must also sign one.

In order to keep the identities of the masks secret, audience members and the majority of the production staff were not allowed to watch the unmasking and were removed from the studio moments before the celebrities are revealed, with Günsberg revealing that there were "only 8 people in the room when it [the unmasking] happened."

Audience members had to place their phones in a special magnetic locked pouch when they were on set and were frequently swept throughout filming by security, which included former ASIO officials, for any devices and hidden cameras to ensure the masks' identities were kept secret.

=== Design ===
==== Costumes ====
The costumes are designed and created by Australian Academy Award and BAFTA Award-Winning costume designer Tim Chappel, best known for his work on The Adventures of Priscilla, Queen of the Desert with Lizzy Gardiner.

== Cast ==
=== Panellists and host ===
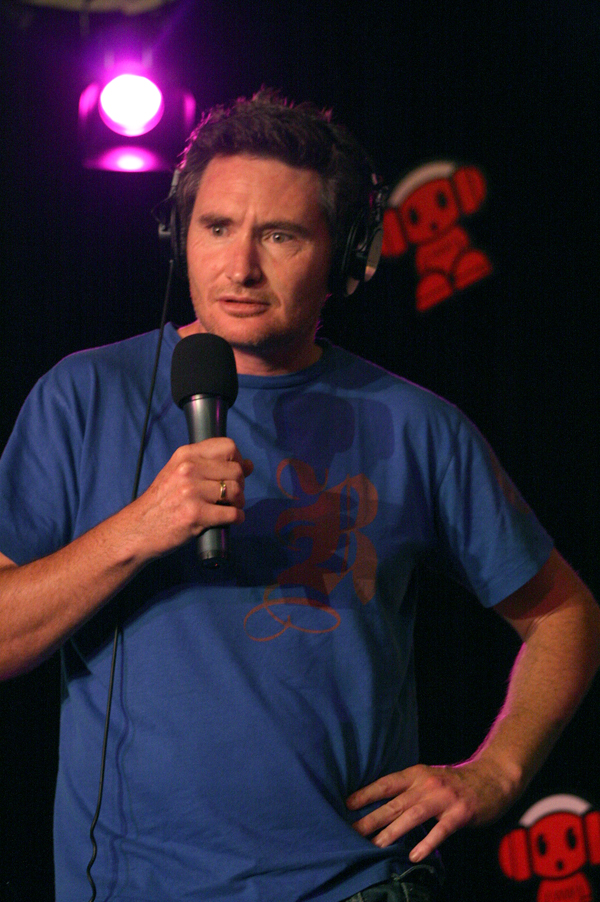
Dave Hughes

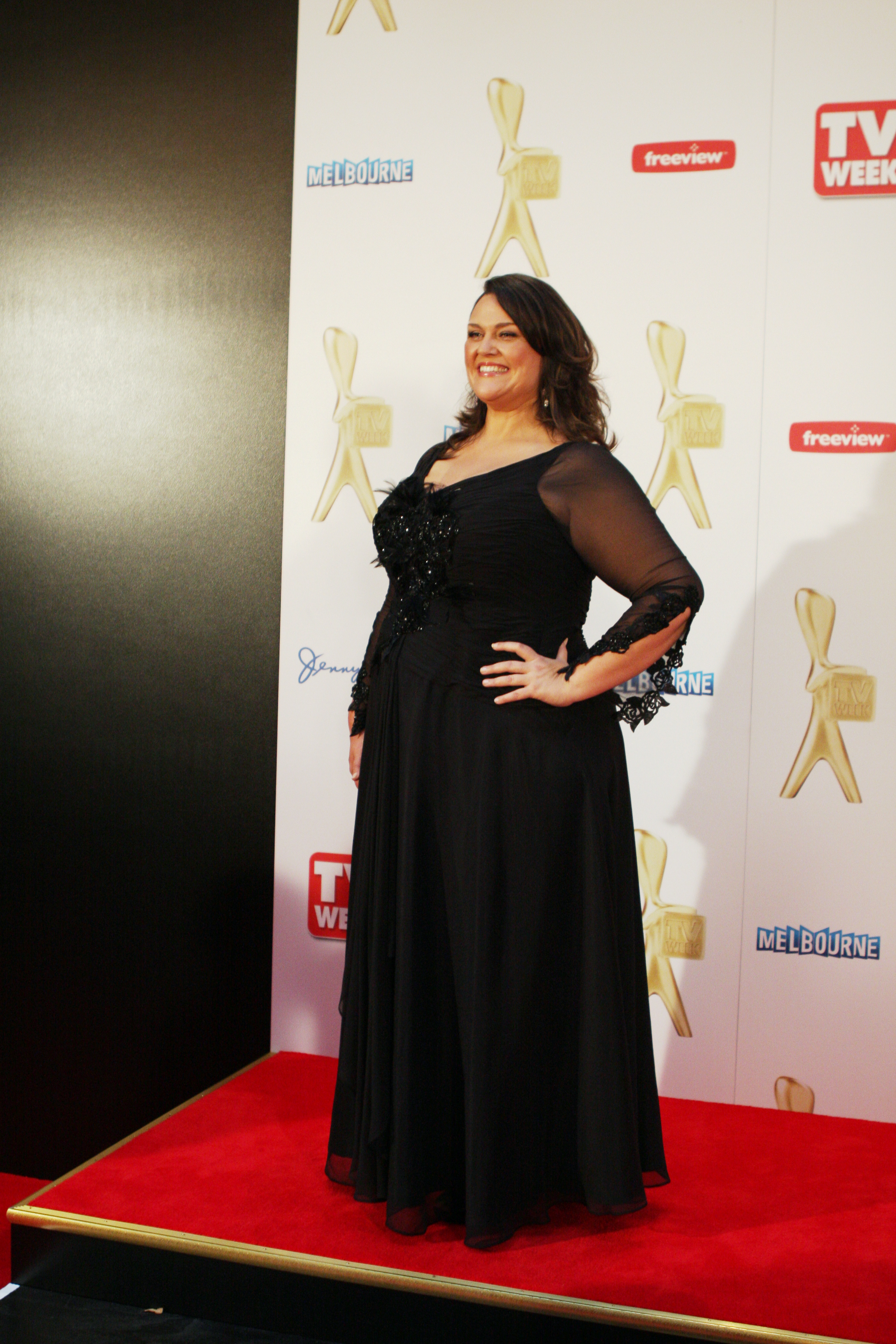
Chrissie Swan

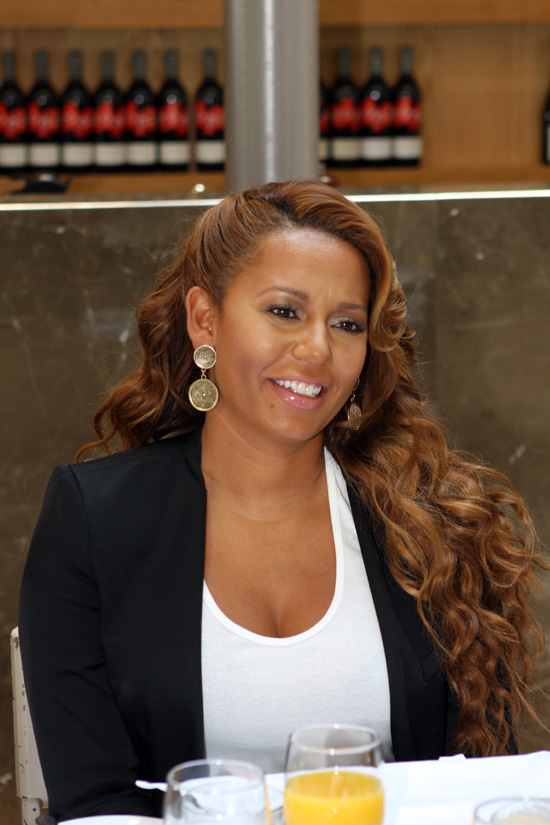
Mel B

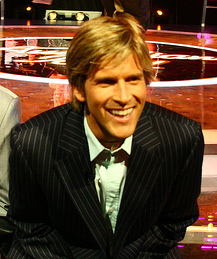
Osher Gunsberg

Following the announcement of the series, it was confirmed by Network 10 that the judging panel would consist of international actress and singer Lindsay Lohan, radio personality Jackie O, singer-songwriter Dannii Minogue and comedian Dave Hughes. It was also confirmed that Osher Günsberg would host the show.

On 7 July 2020, it was revealed that Lohan would be unable to return to the judging panel in the second season, as she could not travel from Dubai to Melbourne because of the COVID-19 pandemic and the implementation of travel restrictions. She was replaced for season two by new panellist, comedian Urzila Carlson (due to her travelling back to USA).

On 4 May 2022, it was announced on The Kyle and Jackie O Show that Carlson would be leaving the show to focus on her comedy tour, with the possibility of Lohan returning after a two-season absence. On 21 May, Minogue announced her departure from the show after three seasons, due to clashing commitments filming a new gay-dating show in the UK, I Kissed a Boy. On 4 June, Jackie O announced she would also depart from the show. On 9 June, Channel 10 announced that the three new panellists joining Dave Hughes for the fourth season would be television and radio presenter Chrissie Swan, television personality and radio host Abbie Chatfield and international singer Mel B.

Cast timeline
Cast Member	Seasons				
Cast Member	1 (2019)	2 (2020)	3 (2021)	4 (2022)	5 (2023)
Panel
Dannii Minogue	Main	Main	Main		
Jackie O	Main	Main	Main		
Dave Hughes	Main	Main	Main	Main	Main
Lindsay Lohan	Main				
Nazeem Hussain	Guest				
Luke McGregor	Guest				
Urzila Carlson		Main	Main		
Chrissie Swan				Main	Main
Abbie Chatfield				Main	Main
Mel B				Main	Main
Host
Osher Günsberg	Main	Main	Main	Main	Main

== Season overview ==
Series overview
Series	Contestants	Episodes	Originally released		Winner	Runner-up	Third place
Series	Contestants	Episodes	First released	Last released	Winner	Runner-up	Third place
1	12	10	23 September 2019	21 October 2019	Cody Simpson as "Robot"	Rob Mills as "Wolf"	Gorgi Coghlan as "Monster"
2	12	11	10 August 2020	14 September 2020	Bonnie Anderson as "Bushranger"	Kate Miller-Heidke as "Queen"	Eddie Perfect as "Frillneck"
3	12	11	13 September 2021	5 October 2021	Anastacia as "Vampire"	Em Rusciano as "Dolly"	Axle Whitehead as "Mullet"
4	12	11	7 August 2022	28 August 2022	Melody Thornton as "Mirrorball"	Sheldon Riley as "Snapdragon"	Hugh Sheridan as "Rooster"
5	13	12	11 September 2023	7 November 2023	Dami Im as "Snow Fox"	Darren Hayes as "Grim Reaper"	Conrad Sewell as "Bouncer"

== Awards and nominations ==
Year	Award	Category	Nominee(s)	Result	Ref.
2019	9th AACTA Awards	Best Entertainment Program	The Masked Singer	Nominated	
2019	9th AACTA Awards	Best Costume Design in Television	Tim Chappel	Nominated	
2020	10th AACTA Awards	Best Costume Design in Television	Tim Chappel	Nominated	
2021	11th AACTA Awards	Best Entertainment Program	The Masked Singer	Nominated	
2022	62nd Logie Awards	Most Popular Entertainment Program	The Masked Singer	Nominated	
2022	62nd Logie Awards	Most Outstanding Entertainment or Comedy Program	The Masked Singer	Nominated	
2023	63rd Logie Awards	Gold Logie for Most Popular Television Personality	Osher Günsberg	Nominated	
2023	63rd Logie Awards	Most Outstanding Entertainment Program	The Masked Singer	Nominated	

== Controversy ==
In October 2019, American band Halocene claimed that the program had stolen "note for note, beat for beat" their arrangement of "Bad Guy" by Billie Eilish, which the Lion (Kate Ceberano) sang during the third episode. The rock trio had released the cover on their YouTube channel, which also included original melodies from an unreleased original song. The band threatened legal action and set up a GoFundMe page, receiving support from their fans.

== See also ==
- Australian Idol
- Australia's Got Talent
- It Takes Two
- List of Australian television series
- The Masked Singer
