= Abbie Chatfield =

Australian media personality (born 1994/1995)

- Born: 1994 or 1995 (age 31–32); Gold Coast, Queensland, Australia
- Education: Queensland University of Technology
- Occupations: Media personality, presenter, podcaster
- Years active: 2019–present
- Employer(s): Network 10; LISTNR
- Notable work: Owner of Verbose the Label
- Television: The Bachelor Australia; I'm a Celebrity...Get Me Out of Here!; Bachelor in Paradise Australia; The Masked Singer Australia; FBoy Island Australia
- Partner: Adam Hyde (2024–present)

Abbie Chatfield (born 1994 or 1995) is an Australian media personality, presenter and podcaster. She is best known for her appearances on reality television as both a contestant and host, including serving as a panellist on The Masked Singer Australia from 2022 until 2023, when it was axed. She is also well known for her political activism in progressive politics, which she speaks about on her podcast, It's A Lot with Abbie Chatfield.

She rose to fame as the runner-up on the seventh season of The Bachelor Australia. She later appeared as a contestant on the third season of Bachelor in Paradise Australia. Chatfield went on to win the seventh season of Network 10's I'm A Celebrity...Get Me Out Of Here! Australia in early 2021, and later that year, appeared as the host of 9 Network's Love Island Afterparty Australia. In 2022, Chatfield landed her own mini TV series as a part of Network 10's pilot showcase called Abbie Chats. In 2023, she began hosting a new reality series, FBoy Island Australia, on Binge. She previously hosted her own national radio show Hot Nights with Abbie Chatfield on the Hit Network.

== Early life and education ==
Chatfield was born on the Gold Coast. She grew up in the southern Gold Coast suburb of Elanora and attended primary school at Aspley State Primary School while regularly competing in local dance competitions throughout her childhood. After spending the majority of her upbringing living on the northside of Brisbane, Chatfield moved to Brisbane to finish her secondary schooling at St Rita's College and later attended Queensland University of Technology, graduating in 2018 with a bachelor's degree in property economics. In a 2024 interview she stated "the Gold Coast is more my home to me than Brisbane" and said she hopes to move back to her home city to raise a family in the future.

== Career ==
Chatfield first gained media attention in 2019 when she was the runner-up on season seven of Network 10's The Bachelor Australia. Also in 2019, she launched her podcast It's a Lot, on LISTNR which often appeared on top of the Australian iTunes Charts.

In 2020, Chatfield appeared on the third season of Network 10's Bachelor in Paradise Australia, where she was eliminated in episode 2.

In 2021, Chatfield won the seventh season of Network 10's I'm a Celebrity...Get Me Out of Here! for her charity Dementia Australia.

Also in 2021, Chatfield hosted Love Island Afterparty Australia, where she spoke about all the latest drama on Love Island Australia. It was rumoured that she could replace Sophie Monk as the host of Love Island Australia for the fourth season.

In January 2022, Chatfield made a viral vaccination rant which was morphed into a song called "Ketamine", which became a Hottest 100 contender.

Also in 2022, Chatfield started hosting her own radio show Hot Nights with Abbie Chatfield, which was to air nationally on the Hit Network. She joined the panel on The Masked Singer Australia for the fourth season to replace Urzila Carlson alongside Mel B, Chrissie Swan and original panelist Dave Hughes.

In May 2022, Chatfield launched her own clothing line, Verbose the Label. The brand promoted inclusive sizing and diverse representation. It was shut down only a year after its launch. "I am so beyond lucky to do what I do for work. I f***ing love it. But I'm breaking," she wrote in Instagram post shortly before the brand shutting down. She added "I'm on the verge of tears at all times. If one thing goes wrong, the floodgates open. I have so much pressure on me all the time to be fun or entertaining or at the very least have something of value to say. It's draining. Physically and mentally."

In June 2022, Chatfield revealed that she had landed her own TV show as a part of the pilot showcase with Network 10 called Abbie Chats. The show premiered in July 2022. That November, she launched her own beer line, Spill Easy Going Lager. In December 2022, Chatfield was announced as the host of a new reality show on Binge called FBoy Island Australia. The show officially aired on 30 May 2023.

On 17 August 2023, Chatfield announced that she was stepping back from her national radio show, after hosting the show for a year and a half. She said in a video uploaded to her Instagram that the choice to leave was entirely up to her, saying she purely didn't want to do it anymore, and her busy schedule made it hard to commit to daily radio.

== Filmography ==
Year	Title	Role	Notes
2019	The Bachelor Australia	Contestant	Runner-up
2020	Bachelor In Paradise Australia	Contestant	
2020	Reputation Rehab	Various	Episode: "Reality TV Villains"
2021	I'm A Celebrity...Get Me Out Of Here!	Contestant	Queen of the Jungle
2021	Love Island Afterparty Australia	Host	
2022–2023	The Masked Singer Australia	Judge	
2022	Abbie Chats	Host	Pilot
2023-present	FBoy Island Australia	Host	
2025	Spicks and Specks	Guest	

== Personal life ==
Chatfield was in a brief relationship with former Channel [V] presenter Danny Clayton in 2020. In the following year, she began an open relationship with a fellow reality television contestant, the late Konrad Bien-Stephen, after he appeared on The Bachelorette. However, in September 2022, she confirmed that she and Konrad had separated. In June 2024, Chatfield confirmed her relationship with Adam Hyde, a member of Australian music duo Peking Duk who also performs under the name Keli Holiday.

Chatfield grew up in both the Gold Coast and Brisbane. She currently lives in Bondi, where she purchased an apartment in 2022. She also invested in a house in the Byron Bay hinterland where she resides part-time when she has a break from work commitments in Sydney.

Chatfield has spoken publicly about having an ADHD diagnosis.

In October 2025, Chatfield was ordered to pay about $109,000 in combined damages and legal fees to a former friend over an uncontested defamation lawsuit. The case arose from Chatfield angrily posting about Greens leader Adam Bandt's loss in the May federal election, and her former friend writing back that the loss was a positive event for Melbourne's Jewish community (in regard to the politician's stances). Chatfield posted in her stories that he was a genocide supporter, a cheerleader for murdering children and a "right-wing troll", and accused him of extortion in a later filing that was introduced into her ultimately-losing defence.
