= Hot Nights With Abbie Chatfield =

Australian radio show

- Running time: 2 hours (7:00 pm – 9:00 pm)
- Country of origin: Australia
- Language: English
- Home station: 2Day FM Sydney
- Syndicates: Hit Network
- Hosted by: Abbie Chatfield
- Original release: 17 January 2022 – 17 August 2023

Hot Nights With Abbie Chatfield was an Australian night time radio show on the Hit Network, and was hosted by Abbie Chatfield.

== History ==
In early 2022, it was revealed that television personality and podcaster Abbie Chatfield had landed her very own national radio show across the Hit Network called Hot Nights With Abbie Chatfield. The show was set to broadcast in over 50 radio stations across Australia on 17 January 2022. It was also revealed that Abbie would be joined by anchor Rohan Edwards on the show, and the executive producer would be Max Corstorphan.

The show airs at 7pm every weekinight after Hughesy, Ed & Erin, which goes from 6pm until 7pm weeknights. the show finishes at 9pm and is followed by Jimmy & Nath.

In April 2023, it was announced that the show's executive producer, Max Corstorphan would be leaving the show immediately. Just weeks after Corstorphan's departure, Abbie's radio anchor and co-host Rohan Edwards abruptly resigned from the show. Just days later, Chatfield's second radio co-host Nic Kelly suddenly left his position at the show after less than a week.

In August 2023, Chatfield resigned from the Hit Network. Jimmy & Nath replaced Hot Nights With Abbie Chatfield.
