= Eddie Perfect =

Australian actor and comedian

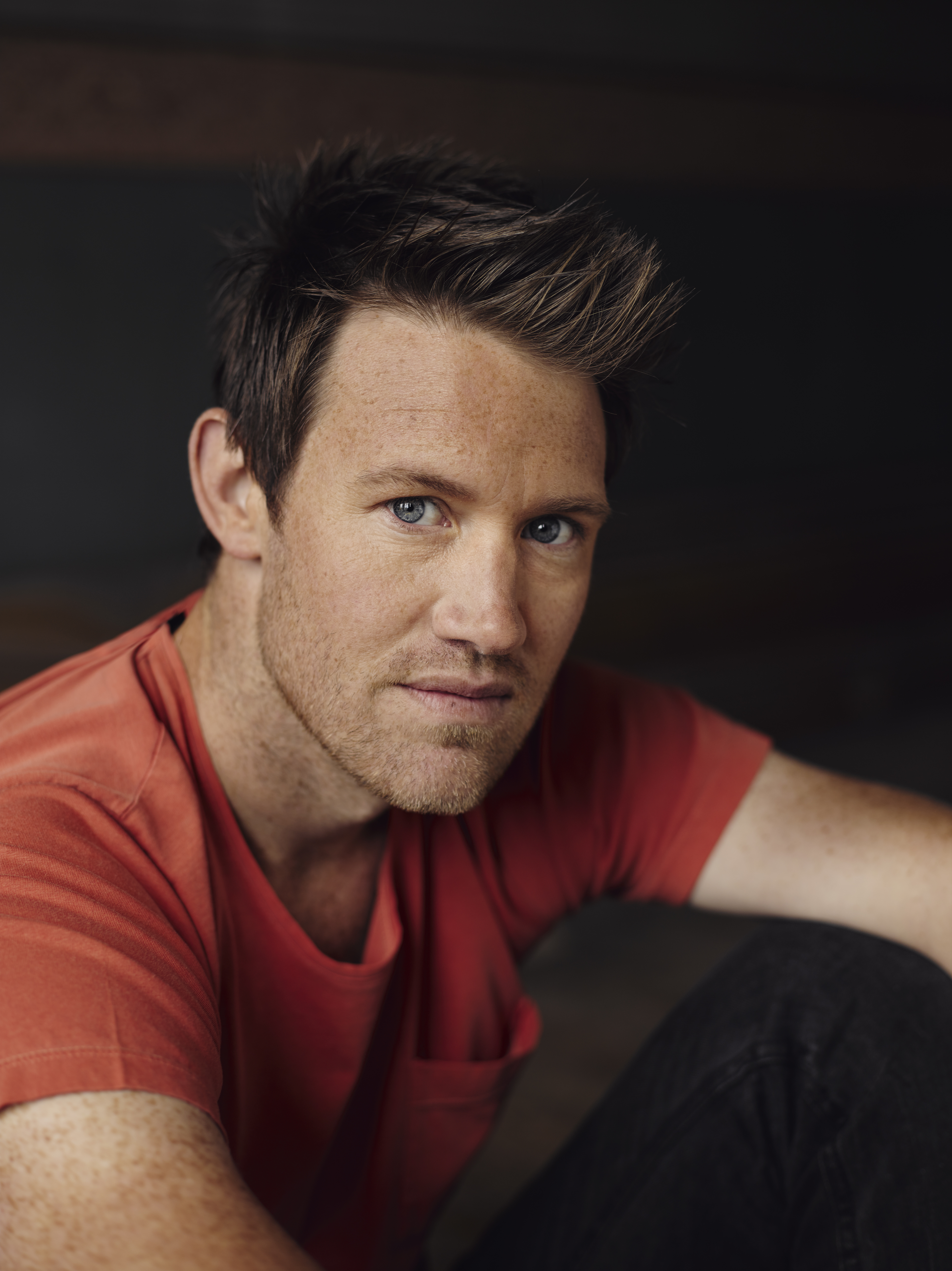
- Perfect in 2013
- Born: Edmund Perfect; Melbourne, Victoria, Australia
- Occupations: Singer-songwriter; musician; comedian; writer; actor
- Spouse: Lucy Cochran (m. 2009)
- Children: 2

Edmund Perfect (born 17 December 1977) is an Australian musician, comedian, writer and actor.

Widely known for his role as Mick Holland in Channel Ten's TV series Offspring in which he performs his own music, he has recorded solo albums and written and performed numerous cabaret shows, including Songs from the Middle with the Brodsky Quartet. His biographical musical comedy Shane Warne: The Musical won the 2009 Helpmann Award for Best New Australian Work, a Victorian Premier's Literary Award and a Green Room Award. Following his songwriting career on Broadway, where he composed Beetlejuice and King Kong, Perfect returned to Australia where he was to star as Franklin Hart Jr. in Dolly Parton's musical 9 to 5 in late 2020, although it was subsequently indefinitely postponed due to the COVID-19 pandemic in Australia.

== Early life and education ==
Edmund Perfect was born on 17 December 1977, in Melbourne to teachers Judy and Tom Perfect. He has two sisters. His father Tom was an Englishman who settled in Australia. Perfect was educated at St Bede's College, in Mentone, Victoria where he was the dux of the school in 1995. He undertook a Bachelor of Arts at the Western Australian Academy of Performing Arts, graduating in 2001.

== Career ==
=== Overview ===
Known for his political comedy, Perfect has appeared on Australian TV shows including Kath & Kim, Spicks and Specks, Good News Week, Stingers, Blue Heelers, MDA, The Melbourne Comedy Festival Gala and The Sideshow. Perfect released the solo albums Welcome to the Inside of Ed's Head and Angry Eddie, which was released after his appearance on the anti-Howard government compilation Rock Against Howard. He was awarded the best entertainer in The Bulletin's Brightest 100 Australians.

=== Early stage work ===
Perfect has appeared in live stage shows including The Big Con with veteran Australian actor and impersonator Max Gillies in 2005, and his solo show Drink Pepsi, Bitch!, which satirised Australian politics and society and consumer culture. Drink Pepsi, Bitch! toured the Edinburgh Fringe, London's Menier Chocolate Factory, the Auckland Festival, the Christchurch Festival, Melbourne's Malthouse Theatre, the Adelaide Fringe Festival, and The Sydney Comedy Festival, although he was obliged to censor the show's title (which was amended to Drink Eddie™ Bitch!) for his season at the Sydney Opera House due to the beverage company named in the title being a principal sponsor of the venue.

In 2007, Perfect appeared in Keating! the Musical playing several characters, including a parody of former Australian Minister for Foreign Affairs Alexander Downer.

In 2008, Perfect wrote Shane Warne: The Musical, a satire based on the life and exploits of Australian test cricketer Shane Warne. The musical had a workshop showing at the Adelaide Cabaret Festival on 17 July 2007 and the piece underwent further workshopping in early 2008 culminating in five work-in-progress showings at The Hi-Fi Bar and Ballroom as part of the Melbourne International Comedy Festival. Shane Warne The Musical premiered at the Melbourne Athenaeum Theatre on 10 December 2008 before embarking on a national tour. In 2009 the musical received the Helpmann Award for Best New Australian Work, the Green Room Award and a Victorian Premier's Literary Award. Updated to reflect new developments in Warne's life, the show enjoyed a revival at Hamer Hall in Melbourne in June 2013, directed by Simon Phillips, with Perfect in the title role and co-starring Lisa McCune, Shane Jacobson and Christie Whelan-Browne as Liz Hurley. A cast recording was released in 2014.

In 2010, he performed Songs from the Middle, a song cycle inspired by Perfect's childhood in Mentone, Victoria. Eamonn Kelley in The Australian described the work as "a poignant narrative of adult reconciliation with a place and a past from which he fled at the first opportunity, restless and with no sense of belonging". He played the lead role of Mack the Knife in The Threepenny Opera at the Malthouse Theatre, Melbourne. In 2011 he played the same role in the Sydney Theatre Company's remount of this production. He hosted FOX8's Ultimate School Musical, which he also directed. Later in the year he played the role of Mick Holland in Channel Ten's Offspring comedy-drama series. He also presented an award at the 2010 ARIA Music Awards.

His solo show Misanthropology premiered at the Spiegeltent, in January 2011, as part of the Sydney Festival. Mingling satire and homage, with Perfect's arrangements for a three-piece band, Perfect wanted to provide "a kind of social autopsy [of our] cultural rituals." In targeting eco-tourists, self-righteous cyclists, and others including Barrie Kosky, Perfect tried to examine "the qualities that have driven our evolution, such as the urge to conquer and compete, and the urge to procreate, trip us up and reveal us as the animals we really are." Perfect said of the show: "Tonight I invite you to laugh and think and question humanity in all of its wondrous idiocy. Remember, healthy, cynical self-reflection is what separates us from Kyle Sandilands."

=== Broadway ===
In 2015, Perfect moved to New York to pursue a career on Broadway, where he met with John Buzzetti, the American agent for fellow Australian songwriter and comedian Tim Minchin, a close friend of Perfect. Since moving to New York, Perfect has written songs for two Broadway musicals during the 2018–19 season; King Kong (which opened at the Broadway Theatre in October 2018, and closed in August 2019) and Beetlejuice (which opened at the Winter Garden Theatre in April 2019, following a pre-Broadway tryout at the National Theatre in Washington D.C. in October 2018).

=== Return to the stage ===
Following Perfect's success in New York, he planned to return to the stage to star in the Australian premiere of Dolly Parton's musical, 9 to 5 in the leading role of Franklin Hart Jr. The show was due to begin previews at Sydney's Lyric Theatre on 19 April 2020, before touring to Melbourne's Her Majesty's Theatre from 25 July. However, due to the global coronavirus pandemic, the production was delayed until finally opening in Sydney's Capitol Theatre on 16 February 2022. The show also played in Brisbane in May of 2022 and Melbourne in July of 2022.

In May 2025, he played the title role in the Australia premiere of Beetlejuice the Musical.

=== New works ===
After a three year development at the Western Australian Academy of Performing Arts, in collaboration with director Dean Bryant (him and Perfect being WAAPA alumni), Perfect brought the original musical Tivoli Lovely to the State Theatre Centre of Western Australia, in which he wrote the book, music, lyrics and original idea. This production ran from the 7th to the 14th of November 2025, performed by the WAAPA third year graduating class of 2025 musical theatre students.

== Other activities ==
In November 2011, he hosted the Inside Film Awards at Sydney's Luna Park.

On 28 October 2015, it was confirmed that Perfect would be a new judge on Australia's Got Talent for its eighth season to replace Timomatic.

In December 2019, Perfect wrote a song for Tourism Australia's new advertising campaign targeting British audiences. It debuted prior to the Queen's annual Christmas message.

In 2020, Perfect participated in The Masked Singer Australia as the "Frillneck" and placed third on the second season of the show.

== Personal life ==
As of 2010, Perfect is married to Lucy Cochran (sister of composer and pianist Julian Cochran), and they have two daughters.

== Filmography ==
| Year | Title | Role | Notes |
|---|---|---|---|
| 2002 | Stingers | Stumpy | Episode: "Big Fish" |
| 2002 | Blue Heelers | Mark Lalor | Episode: "Broken Dreams" |
| 2002 | MDA | Nigel Newland | Episode: "Flight or Fight" |
| 2002 | Bootleg | TV studio floor manager | 3 episodes |
| 2004 | Kath & Kim | Brett's Co-Worker | 2 episodes |
| 2010–14; 2016 | Offspring | Mick Holland | 60 episodes |
| 2014 | It's a Date | Jeremy | Episode: "Should You Date on Impulse?" |
| 2014 | Comedy Showroom | Eddie | Episode: "The Future is Expensive" |
| 2020 | Love in Lockdown | Ned | 6 episodes |
| 2025 | Claire Hooper's House of Games | Self | 5 episodes |

== Discography ==
=== Albums ===
List of albums, with selected chart positions
| Title | Album details | Peak chart positions |
| Title | Album details | AUS |
|---|---|---|
| Welcome to the Inside of Ed's Head | Released: 2003; Label: Middle Eight Music | — |
| Angry Eddie | Released: 2005; Label: Madman Entertainment; Note: CD+DVD | — |
| Drink Pepsi, Bitch | Released: 2006; Label: Eddie Perfect; Recorded live at Sydney Opera House in October 2005 | — |
| Misanthropology | Released: 2011; Label: Eddie Perfect; Recorded live at The Famous Spiegeltent, 2011. | — |
| Seasons of Love (with Graeme Lyall, Gian Slater and Tony Gould) | Released: 2013; Label: Move | — |
| Australian Songs (As Perfect Tripod) | Released: 2013; Label: Liberation Music | — |
| Beetlejuice: The Demos the Demos the Demos | Released: 2020; Label: Ghostlight | — |
| Beetlejuice the Musical (Live at the Regent Theatre Melbourne) | Released: October 2026; Label: Excited Animal | 5 |

=== Other appearances ===
List of other non-single song appearances
| Title | Year | Album |
|---|---|---|
| "John Howard's Bitches" | 2004 | Rock Against Howard – Musicians Against the Liberal Government |
| various (with Martin Martini and the Bone Palace Orchestra) | 2005 | Live at the Famous Rainbow Hotel |
| "Burn Out" (with Mammal) | 2006 | Vol.2: Systematic / Automatic |
| "Downtown" (with The Renovators) | 2009 | The Colors Tribute Album Vol. 1 |
| "That's the Way They Get Ya" (with The Renovators) | 2009 | The Colors Tribute Album Vol. 1 |
| "Break Your Fall" | 2010 | Music from the Original Series OffSpring |
| "You Make Me Happy" (with Clare Bowditch) | 2012 | The Winter I Chose Happiness |

== Awards and nominations ==
=== APRA Awards ===
The APRA Awards are presented annually from 1982 by the Australasian Performing Right Association (APRA), "honouring composers and songwriters". They commenced in 1982.

| Year | Nominee / work | Award | Result | Ref. |
|---|---|---|---|---|
| 2013 | "You Make Me Happy" (Clare Bowditch and Eddie Perfect) | Song of the Year | Shortlisted | |

=== Helpmann Awards ===
The Helpmann Awards is for live performance in Australia and are awarded annually by Live Performance Australia.

| Year | Award | Work | Result |
|---|---|---|---|
| 2009 | Best Male Actor in a Musical | Shane Warne: The Musical | Nominated |
| 2009 | Best New Australian Work | Shane Warne: The Musical | Won |
| 2011 | Best Cabaret Performer | Misanthropology | Won |
| 2016 | Best Original Score | Songs from the Middle | Nominated |

=== Tony Awards ===
The Tony Award is for live performance on Broadway and are awarded annually by American Theatre Wing and The Broadway League.

| Year | Award | Work | Result |
|---|---|---|---|
| 2019 | Best Original Score | Beetlejuice | Nominated |
