= American Express Gold Card dress =

1995 Academy Awards dress

- Designer: Lizzy Gardiner
- Year: 1995
- Material: American Express Gold cards

Australian costume designer Lizzy Gardiner wore a dress made of 254 American Express Gold cards to the 67th Academy Awards on 27 March 1995, where she won the Best Costume Design award for her work on the 1994 film The Adventures of Priscilla, Queen of the Desert. All of the cards were authentic, but had expired.

== Background and history ==
The gown had originally been conceived for the film The Adventures of Priscilla, Queen of the Desert along with many other outlandish costumes such as one made solely out of pink flip flops, but American Express had forbidden it. Gardiner said, "I'm broke, and I didn't have anything to wear. So I went through my list of past good ideas." The dress was auctioned off for charity in March 1999 for $12,650, with the proceeds going to AmfAR, The Foundation for AIDS Research. It, along with other costumes for Priscilla, was inspired by Sydney's drag queen culture of the 1990s.

== Design ==
The outfit was made of 254 expired American Express gold cards, and was split to the waist. The under garment was made entirely of the cards, except for the slim gold straps at the top, although the gold shawl which went over the under garment only had cards lining the edges. Gardiner completed the outfit with gold platform shoes.

== Reception ==
Cosmopolitan magazine cited the dress as one of the worst Oscar dresses of all time, saying, "It's a dress made of American Express Gold cards. We're not sure what else to say about this one, except that the obvious lesson is this: For the love of God, do not design your own dress for the red carpet." Time magazine also voted the dress as amongst the worst Oscar dresses of all time saying, "Our problem with the outfit Gardiner wore to accept her award isn't that her dress was made out of a bizarre, nontraditional material. Our problem is that the material of choice was the American Express gold card. It's tacky. And how did she sit down in that thing?" In contrast, Variety magazine's Complete Book of Oscar Fashion referred to Gardiner's dress as "clever".

Seeing the promotional potential of the dress, American Express were reported to have wanted to showcase the dress in its travel offices throughout the US. The dress is now held by the National Gallery of Victoria. Other designers have produced dresses based on credit cards since Gardiner's creation. In 2015, designer Alexander Wang dressed model Anna Ewers for the Council of Fashion Designers of America (CFDA) Awards in a dress made of 500 American Express cards, cut into sequins. The Vaquera collective designed a dress in 2017 constructed primarily of credit cards that had the name "Vaquera" rendered in the style of the Hollywood Sign.

== See also ==
- List of individual dresses
