= Welcome to the Inside of Ed's Head =

Studio album by Eddie Perfect
- Released: 2003
- Genre: Satirical
- Label: Middle Eight Music

Welcome to the Inside of Ed's Head is an Australian album by Eddie Perfect.

== Track listing ==
1. "Welcome to the Inside of Ed's Head"
2. "The Blondeness of You"
3. "The Boat Song"
4. "A Word from Bruce"
5. "Live to Regret Loving You"
6. "Choosing a Hat"
7. "The Lord Hath Prepared a House"
8. "Don't Wanna Be Down"
9. "What If?"
10. "The Beehive Song"
11. "Someone Like That (a tribute to Nick Enright)"
12. "Another Word from Bruce"
13. "Why Not Leave?"
14. "Looking Up"
15. "Dwayne's Song introduction"
16. "Dwayne's Song (Some of My Best Friends Are Aboriginal)"
