= Em Rusciano =

Australian entertainer

- Born: Emelia Rachael Rusciano; 1979 (age 46–47); Greensborough, Victoria, Australia
- Occupations: Comedian; podcaster; television presenter; radio presenter; singer-songwriter; author; entertainer
- Years active: 2003–present
- Known for: Rage and Rainbows stand-up special, 2021 The Masked Singer Runner Up, Presenting at the National Press Club, Emsolation podcast with Michael Lucas 2020-present
- Spouse: Scott Barrow
- Children: 3
- Website: emrusciano.com

Emelia Rachael Rusciano (born 1979) is an Australian comedian, singer-songwriter, television and radio presenter, podcaster, author and entertainer.

== Early life ==
Rusciano was born and raised in Greensborough, Victoria, and grew up in Diamond Creek and Warrandyte. She attended Eltham College and Forest Hill College.

== Career ==
Rusciano has appeared on All Star Family Feud, The Circle, The Project, Studio 10 and Hughesy, We Have a Problem.

Rusciano competed on the second season of Australian Idol, where she finished in ninth place.

In 2009, Rusciano left the 92.9 breakfast show in Perth after four years and returned to Melbourne. From August 2012 to May 2013, she co-hosted the radio show Mamamia Today with Dave Thornton on the Today Network.

In January 2016, Rusciano toured Australia with her stand-up comedy show, Em Rusciano Is Not a Diva.

In June 2016, Rusciano joined the Hit Network to host The Em Rusciano Show on Sunday nights.

Rusciano published her memoir Try Hard: Tales from the Life of a Needy Overachiever on 26 October 2016.

In January 2017, Rusciano was announced as one of two hosts for 2Day FM's new breakfast show. She left the show in September 2018, due to her pregnancy. Rusciano admitted her time at 2Day FM was a "mixed bag".

In 2021, Rusciano appeared on season three of The Masked Singer Australia and finished runner-up as “Dolly”.

Rusciano was nominated for the 2024 AACTA Audience Choice Award for Favourite Media Personality (and was noted as "Best on Ground" by Fashion Critical at the red carpet event).

== Personal life ==
Rusciano married Scott Barrow on 2 September 2007. Em and Scott separated in 2024. They have two daughters and one son. She was diagnosed with ADHD at age 42 and autism in November 2022.
