= Tim Chappel =

Australian costume designer (b. 1966 or 1967)

- Born: 1966 or 1967 (age 57–58); Australia
- Occupation: Costume designer
- Website: www.timchappel.com

Tim Chappel (born 1966 or 1967) is an Australian costume designer. He won an Academy Award for Best Costume Design, with Lizzy Gardiner, for the film The Adventures of Priscilla, Queen of the Desert.

His costumes have also been featured in the Australian and American versions of The Masked Singer.

== Selected filmography ==
- The Adventures of Priscilla, Queen of the Desert (1994)
