= Lizzy Gardiner =

Australian costume designer (born 1966)

- Born: Dubbo, Orana, New South Wales, Australia
- Education: Accademia Italiana
- Occupation: Costume designer
- Children: 1

Lizzy Gardiner is an Australian costume designer, who has been working in Hollywood since the early 1990s. Noted for her originality, she is best known for her American Express gold card dress which she wore to collect her Academy Award for Best Costume Designer at the 67th Academy Awards in 1995 for her work on The Adventures of Priscilla, Queen of the Desert. Her highest profile film was Mission: Impossible 2 in 2000 for which she designed the costumes.

== Early life ==
Gardiner was born in the rural city of Dubbo, in western New South Wales, and lived there until she was sent to boarding school for six years. She left Australia after finishing high school and moved to Italy, where she studied fashion and costume design for three years at the Accademia di Italiana in Florence.

== Career ==
After graduating she returned to Australia and began working in the Australian film and TV industry, working on the soap opera E Street. While working on E Street in 1993, she began working with Tim Chappel. Together, they designed outlandish costumes for Stephan Elliott's Australian LGBT comedy film The Adventures of Priscilla, Queen of the Desert. Amongst the bizarre costumes they designed for the film was a dress consisting of many pairs of pink flip flops. She studied Australian drag queens and their clothes and commented, "I love the fact that you can do things without much budget."

Subsequent films which Gardiner worked on include Bound (1996), Welcome to Woop Woop (1997), Gone Fishin' (1997), Woundings (1998), Theory of the Trojans (1999), Eye of the Beholder (1999), Mission: Impossible 2 (2000), Effie: Just Quietly TV series (2001), Stealth (2005), The Great Raid (2005), Ghost Rider (2007), and The Ruins (2008).

More recent costume design work includes: Burning Man (2011), A Few Best Men (2011), The Railway Man (2013), Some Kind of Beautiful (2014), Hacksaw Ridge (2016), 2:22 (2017), Peter Rabbit (2018), Swinging Safari (2018), Danger Close (2019), Peter Rabbit 2: The Runaway (2020), and The King's Daughter (2022).

Gardiner has a biographical entry in the book 1001 Australians You Should Know. She was also very selected as one of the entrants to the Who's Who in Australia 2012 edition.

== Awards ==
Gardiner and Chappel's costumes won the Academy Award for Best Costume Design at the 67th Academy Awards, Best Costume at the British Academy of Film and Television Arts (BAFTA), and Best Costume Design at the Australian Film Institute Awards. The Motion Picture Guide 1995 Annual, covering the films of 1994, said, "The Oscar-winning costumes by Lizzy Gardiner and Tim Chappel are wildly inspired and range from the bizarre to the simply indescribable."

She gained worldwide attention when she picked up her award wearing an unusual dress she designed, consisting of 254 expired American Express gold cards. The dress had originally been made for the film The Adventures of Priscilla, Queen of the Desert but was forbidden by American Express. However, after the dress was worn by Gardiner herself, the company saw its marketing potential and was keen to showcase it throughout its travel offices in the United States. The dress was auctioned off for charity in March 1999 for $12,650, with the proceeds going to the American Foundation for AIDS research. It has been cited as amongst the worst Oscar gowns of all time.

== Personal life ==
As of mid-2017, Gardiner was living in Australia with her only child, a daughter.

In answer to queries about her working on the gay film and a lesbian thriller, Gardiner who identifies as straight, said, "It just never occurred to me that sexuality is an issue. Australia has grown up dramatically in the past five years."
