= Paulini discography =

- Paulini singing in 2018
- Studio albums: 4
- Extended plays: 1
- Singles: 19
- Music videos: 12
- Other appearances: 4

Fijian-born Australian singer and songwriter Paulini has released four studio albums, one extended play, nineteen singles (including two as a featured artist), and twelve music videos. Paulini placed fourth on the first season of Australian Idol in 2003, and subsequently signed a recording contract with Sony BMG Australia. Her debut studio album, One Determined Heart (2004), debuted at number one on the ARIA Albums Chart, where it remained for two consecutive weeks, and was certified platinum by the Australian Recording Industry Association (ARIA) for shipments of 70,000 copies. Its lead single "Angel Eyes" remained at number one on the ARIA Singles Chart for three consecutive weeks and was also certified platinum, while the second single "We Can Try" peaked at number 30. Paulini followed with the release of her debut EP, Amazing Grace: Songs for Christmas (2004), which peaked at number 70.

Paulini's second studio album Superwoman (2006) failed to match the commercial success of her debut album, and only managed to reach number 72. Despite the underperformance of Superwoman, the album produced the singles "Rough Day", "So Over You" and "I Believe". During this time, Paulini enjoyed commercial success again as a member of the Australian girl group Young Divas. The group released two top-ten albums, Young Divas (2006) and New Attitude (2007), and achieved three top-fifteen singles, including the hugely successful "This Time I Know It's for Real". After Paulini parted ways with the Young Divas and ended her contract with Sony BMG in 2008, she focused more on songwriting. Through a publishing deal with independent label Albert Music, Paulini was able to travel and write songs in Europe, New York and Los Angeles. She wrote songs for several recording artists in Europe, including Monrose, Edurne and Yoann Fréget.

Aside from her songwriting work, Paulini continued to release singles independently between 2009 and 2013. She was also featured on the 2010 single "Believe Again" by Irish recording artist Ronan Keating. Paulini signed a joint record deal with Ambition Records and Decca Records Australia in 2014, and released her long-awaited third studio album Come Alive the following year. A moderate success, the album debuted at number 25 on the ARIA Albums Chart and included the singles "Air It All Out" and "By My Side". This was followed by the release of Paulini's fourth studio album Merry Christmas (2015), which featured cover versions of popular Christmas tunes and failed to impact the charts.

== Albums ==
List of studio albums, with selected chart positions and certifications
Title	Album details	Peak chart positions	Certifications
Title	Album details	AUS	Certifications
One Determined Heart	Released: 23 July 2004; Formats: CD, digital download; Label: Sony BMG	1	ARIA: Platinum
Superwoman	Released: 5 August 2006; Formats: CD, digital download; Label: Sony BMG	72	
Come Alive	Released: 29 May 2015; Formats: CD, digital download; Labels: Fortitude, Decca, Ambition	25	
Merry Christmas	Released: 6 November 2015; Formats: CD, digital download; Label: Ambition	—	

== Extended plays ==
List of extended plays, with selected chart positions
Title	EP details	Peak chart positions
Title	EP details	AUS
Amazing Grace: Songs for Christmas	Released: 26 November 2004; Formats: CD, digital download; Label: Sony BMG	70

== Singles ==
=== As a lead artist ===
List of singles as a lead artist, with selected chart positions and certifications, showing year released and album name
Title	Year	Peak chart positions		Certifications	Albums
Title	Year	AUS	NZ	Certifications	Albums
"Angel Eyes"	2004	1	34	ARIA: Platinum	One Determined Heart
"We Can Try"	2004	30	—		One Determined Heart
"Rough Day"	2006	26	—		Superwoman
"So Over You"	2006	49	—		Superwoman
"I Believe"	2006	—	—		Superwoman
"Receive the Power" (with Guy Sebastian)	2007	—	—		Non-album singles
"Scarless"	2009	—	—		Non-album singles
"Show Me Your Colors (The Ping Pong Mix)"	2011	—	—		Non-album singles
"Fireman"	2012	179	—		Non-album singles
"Ping Pong With My Heart"	2012	—	—		Non-album singles
"Heartbreak Is Over"	2013	—	—		Non-album singles
"Air It All Out"	2014	—	—		Come Alive
"By My Side"	2015	—	—		Come Alive
"Twenty Twenty"	2020	—	—		Non-album singles
"We Are One"	2022	—	—		Non-album singles
"Someone Like You" (with Bradley McCaw)	2022	—	—		Non-album singles
"I Know Him So Well" (with Mirusia)	2022	—	—		Non-album singles
"—" denotes a single that did not chart or was not released in that territory.

=== As a featured artist ===
List of singles as a featured artist, with selected chart positions and certifications, showing year released and album name
Title	Year	Peak chart positions	Certifications	Albums
Title	Year	AUS	Certifications	Albums
"Rise Up" (with Australian Idol Top 12)	2003	1	ARIA: Gold	Australian Idol: The Final 12
"Believe Again" (Ronan Keating featuring Paulini)	2010	66		Duet

== Other appearances ==
List of non-single guest appearances, with or without other performing artists, showing year released and album name
Title	Year	Other artist(s)	Album
"When You Believe"	2001	—N/a	StarStruck
"Many Rhythms, One Love"	2003	—N/a	The Pacific at Its Best
"One Thing Leads to Another"	2003	—N/a	Australian Idol: The Final 12
"Do the Pretzel"	2017	The Wiggles	Duets

== Music videos ==
List of music videos, showing year released and director
Title	Year	Director(s)
"Angel Eyes"	2004	
"We Can Try"	2004	
"Rough Day"	2006	Jonathan and Josh Baker
"So Over You"	2006	Jonathan and Josh Baker
"I Believe"	2006	Selina Stang
"Receive the Power" (with Guy Sebastian)	2007	
"Scarless"	2009	Ross Wood
"Fireman"	2012	Peter Brew-Bevan
"Ping Pong With My Heart"	2012	Peter Brew-Bevan
"Air It All Out"	2014	Andrew Shaw
"By My Side"	2015	Josef J. Weber
"Do the Pretzel" (with The Wiggles)	2017	

== Songwriting credits ==
List of songs written or co-written for other artists, showing year released and album name
Title	Year	Artist	Album
"I'm Only Human"	2009	Cherine Nouri	So Alive
"Definition of a Woman"	2009	Sasha-Lee Davids	Sasha-Lee
"Culpable"	2010	Edurne	Nueva Piel
"Definition of a Woman"	2010	Monrose	Ladylike
"Touching a Stranger"	2011	Wildboyz	—N/a
"Welcome In My House" ("Bienvenue dans ma maison")	2014	Yoann Fréget	Quelques heures avec moi
"Just Like You"	2014	Jessica Reynoso	—N/a

== See also ==
- Young Divas discography
