= Paulini =

Fijian-Australian singer and songwriter (born 1982)

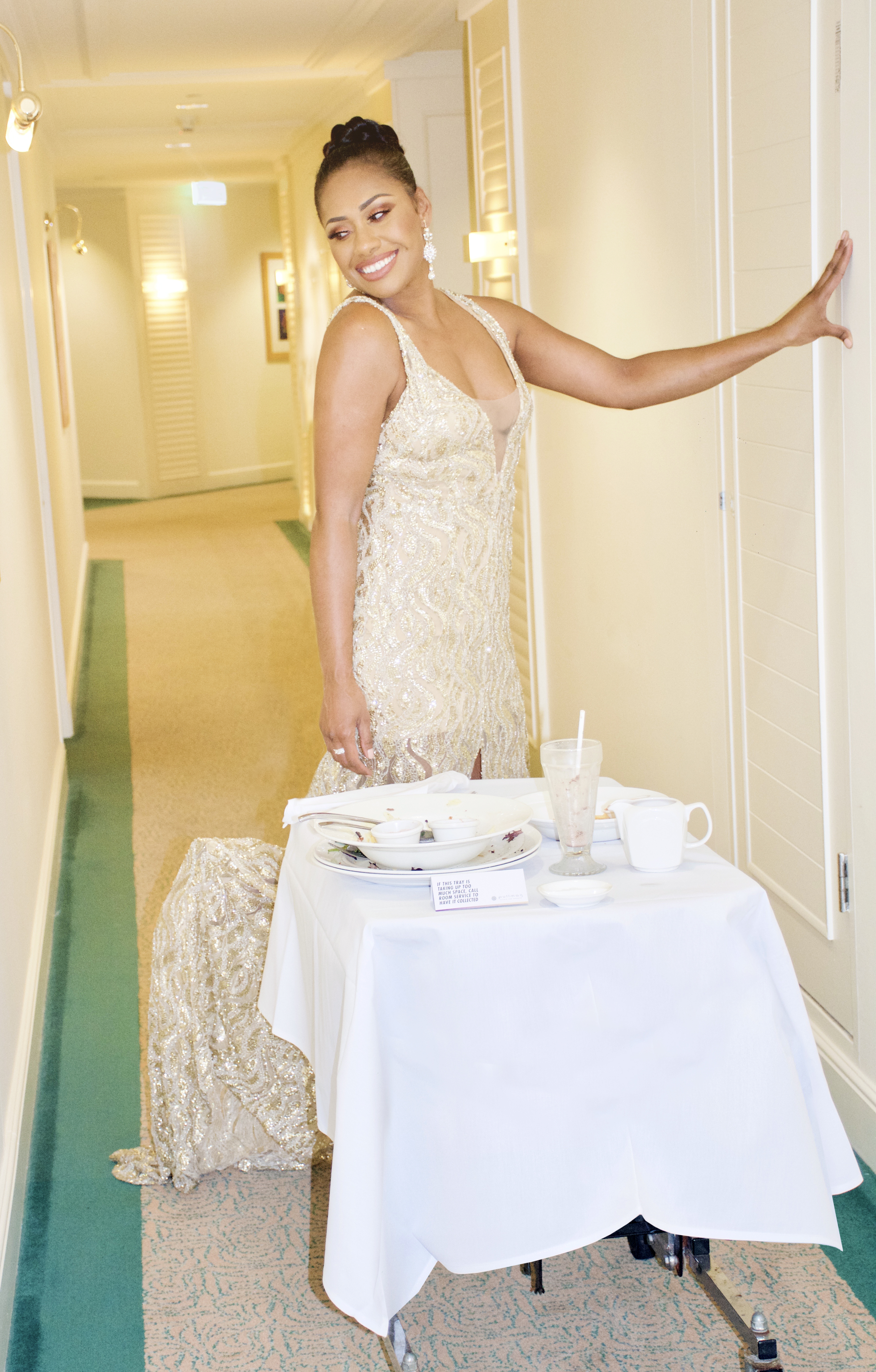
- Paulini in 2018
- Born: Pauline Curuenavuli; 15 October 1982 (age 44); Suva, Fiji
- Occupations: Singer; songwriter; actress
- Years active: 2000–present
- Works: Solo discography; filmography; theatre
- Television: Australian Idol (season 1)
- Musical career
- Genres: R&B; adult contemporary; pop
- Instruments: Vocals; piano
- Labels: Sony BMG; Ambition; Decca
- Formerly of: Young Divas
- Website: https://www.paulini.com.au

Pauline Curuenavuli (born 15 October 1982), known professionally as Paulini, is a Fijian-Australian singer, songwriter and musical theatre actress. Born in Suva, Paulini moved to Sydney with her family at the age of four. She rose to fame in 2003 as a contestant on the first season of Australian Idol and placed fourth in the competition. After Idol, Paulini signed a recording contract with Sony BMG Australia and released her debut studio album One Determined Heart (2004), which debuted at number one on the ARIA Albums Chart and was certified platinum. The album included the platinum single "Angel Eyes", which spent three consecutive weeks at number one on the ARIA Singles Chart. Paulini received two ARIA No. 1 Chart Awards for both the album and single.

In 2006, Paulini released her second studio album Superwoman, which failed to match the commercial success of her debut album. Despite this, the album included the top-thirty single "Rough Day" and earned Paulini two nominations at the Australia/New Zealand Urban Music Awards. That same year, Paulini achieved commercial success again as a member of the Australian girl group Young Divas. The group released two top-ten albums, Young Divas (2006) and New Attitude (2007), and achieved three top-fifteen singles, including the hugely successful "This Time I Know It's for Real". After Paulini parted ways with the Young Divas and ended her contract with Sony BMG in 2008, she focused more on songwriting. Through a publishing deal with independent label Albert Music, Paulini was able to travel and write songs in Europe, New York and Los Angeles. She wrote songs for several recording artists in Europe, South Africa and the Philippines.

Aside from her songwriting work, Paulini continued to release singles independently between 2009 and 2013. She was also featured on the 2010 single "Believe Again" by Irish recording artist Ronan Keating. Paulini released her third and fourth studio albums, Come Alive and Merry Christmas, both in 2015 through a joint record deal with Ambition and Decca Records Australia. Come Alive was a moderate success, debuting at number 25 on the ARIA Albums Chart. In 2017, Paulini made her musical theatre debut in the Australian production of The Bodyguard, playing the lead role of Rachel Marron—originally portrayed by Whitney Houston in the 1992 film of the same name.

== Early life ==
Paulini Curuenavuli was born in Suva, Fiji on 15 October 1982 to parents Isireli, a former choir conductor, and Miliana, a nurse. Her mother Miliana lived and worked alone in Sydney, Australia for two years. Paulini, her five siblings and their father Isireli moved from Fiji to Sydney in 1986, when she was four years old, to join Miliana. Their first home in Australia was a two-bedroom apartment in Randwick, New South Wales, where Paulini attended Coogee Public School. The family later moved to a south-western Sydney suburb, close to the Fijian church they regularly attended. Paulini is the youngest of six siblings; she has three brothers and two sisters. Paulini's eldest brother was shot and killed during a robbery incident in 1990. She recorded a cover of Luba's "Every Time I See Your Picture I Cry", in her brother's memory, for her third album Come Alive (2015). Paulini and her family began singing and playing instruments from a young age, despite not being classically trained in music. Their father taught Paulini and her siblings how to harmonise. At the age of 10, Paulini's father encouraged her to showcase her singing abilities at a church talent quest. It was during this moment Paulini realised that singing is "what I wanted to do with my life." Aside from singing, Paulini also had a passion for playing netball.

As a teenager, Paulini attended Bankstown Girls High School, where she was selected to perform at the Bankstown Millennium Buzz spectacular, held in 2000 to celebrate the Sydney Olympics. As a result of her performance, she was chosen to be a member of the first Bankstown Talent Advance Program (TAP), which enables students to gain confidence and learn important skills in the performing arts from an expert team. Being part of the program helped Paulini to build up her confidence because she was a shy teenager, and it eventually led to her winning the TV talent show StarStruck in 2001. Following her win, Paulini recorded a cover version of the Whitney Houston and Mariah Carey duet "When You Believe" for the show's soundtrack album. With the involvement of her high school music department, Paulini was also a participant in Sydney's annual Schools Spectacular variety show. After leaving high school, Paulini worked in a retail clothing store and became a full-time musician. In February 2003, Paulini became a member of the Fijian band Mixx. She was one of the vocalists for the band alongside her sisters Litia and Sereima, as well as other vocalists Mansus Knight, Aporosa Vakanawa and Biannca Kotobalavu. Other members of Mixx included Ben Kotobalavu on drums, his brother Rowland on bass, Jona Uluinaceva and Henry Foon on keyboards, Apakuki Nayacakalou as the guitarist, and Rupeni Davui on percussion. The band played gigs around Sydney and were even invited to perform at the opening of the 2003 South Pacific Games in Fiji. Paulini recorded the anthem "Many Rhythms, One Love" for the South Pacific Games' official album, The Pacific at Its Best. She eventually left Mixx later that year to audition for the first season of Australian Idol.

== Music career ==
=== 2003: Australian Idol and gold dress controversy ===
In 2003, Paulini successfully auditioned for the first season of Australian Idol, and progressed through to the theatre rounds. Following the theatre round process, Paulini had advanced through to the semi-finals and eventually made it into the top twelve. Throughout the season, Paulini continued to impress the judges and viewers with her performances of songs by Aretha Franklin, Barbra Streisand, Thelma Houston, Toni Braxton and Etta James. In the final five-week, following her rendition of Destiny's Child's "Survivor", male judges Mark Holden and Ian Dickson were not impressed with the tight-fitted gold dress Paulini wore for the performance. Dicko commented on the dress, saying "You should choose more appropriate clothes or shed some pounds", which resulted in a great deal of debate and controversy in the media relating to self-esteem and body image of teenage girls. After hearing Dicko's comments, Paulini went backstage and cried. In an interview with Woman's Day magazine, 11 years after the comment was made, Paulini stated "It affected me a lot and it really hurt my confidence." In the final four-week, Paulini was eliminated from the competition. According to a poll taken on Australian Idol, Paulini's elimination was the second most surprising elimination in the show's history.

Nick Bond of News.com.au described Dicko's criticism of Paulini's gold dress as "one of the most controversial moments in Australian Idol history," while Andrew Bucklow from the same publication labelled it one of the show's "most infamous moments" ever. During Dicko's appearance on The Celebrity Apprentice Australia in 2012, he revealed that "people were virtually spitting on me" after that Australian Idol episode had aired, calling it a defining moment for him because he "became a national pariah" overnight. In an episode of The Celebrity Apprentice and in reference to the gold dress controversy, Dicko made a statue of someone wearing a gold dress with the word "sorry" printed on it. Paulini appeared in the episode to see what Dicko had made and she accepted his apology. In 2014, Dicko told Woman's Day that he does not regret what he said to Paulini, saying "It's part of who I am and who Paulini is and it binds us together." In July 2017, Dicko apologised again in a pre-recorded message he left for Paulini during her radio interview on Hot 91.1 FM's breakfast show, Dave, Sam & Ash. In the message, Dicko said "I was trying to be nice at the time, can you believe, but I'm glad that you've gone on to do such great things." After joking that his "cruel little words" turned them "into Australian reality TV's power couple", he ended his message by telling Paulini, "what I want to say is, I'm so proud of you girl, you go get'em."

=== 2004–05: One Determined Heart and EP release ===
Following her departure on Australian Idol, Paulini signed a recording contract with Sony Music Australia, which later merged with the show's sponsor BMG Records. Her debut studio album One Determined Heart was released on 23 July 2004; it debuted at number one on the ARIA Albums Chart, where it remained for two consecutive weeks, and was certified platinum by the Australian Recording Industry Association (ARIA) for shipments of 70,000 units. The album was produced by Audius Mtawarira, and was mainly a collection of covers, featuring only two original tracks. A cover of The Jeff Healey Band's 1989 hit "Angel Eyes" was released as the first single from One Determined Heart. It peaked at number one on the ARIA Singles Chart, where it remained for three consecutive weeks, and was certified platinum. "Angel Eyes" remained in the top ten for two months, and became the fourth-highest-selling Australian single of 2004. Paulini won two ARIA No. 1 Chart Awards for both the album and single. "Angel Eyes" was also nominated for Highest Selling Single at the 2004 ARIA Music Awards. Original track "We Can Try" was released as the album's second single, and peaked at number 30. The song had better success on the ARIA Urban Singles Chart, where it reached number nine.

In July and August 2004, Paulini was the supporting act for Human Nature's seven-date tour on the East Coast. Paulini's first extended play, Amazing Grace: Songs for Christmas, was released on 26 November 2004, featuring covers of popular Christmas tunes. The EP peaked at number 70 on the ARIA Albums Chart and number seven on the ARIA Urban Albums Chart. That same month, Paulini served as a supporting act for Tina Arena's Greatest Hits Tour. She was also the supporting act for Guy Sebastian's Beautiful Life Tour from March to June 2005.

=== 2006–08: Superwoman and Young Divas ===
Sony BMG announced in April 2005 that Paulini had finished recording her then-upcoming second studio album. However, Sony BMG decided to wait nearly 18 months before releasing the album, which sparked rumours that Paulini was being dropped from the label. After several false release dates and pushbacks, Superwoman was released on 5 August 2006. Featuring mostly original material, the album was recorded in Sydney, Los Angeles, London and Barcelona. Upon its release, Superwoman debuted at number 72 and failed to match the commercial success of Paulini's first album. The album's lead single "Rough Day" was a moderate success, peaking at number 26, while the second single "So Over You" peaked at number 49. The third and final single "I Believe" had a limited radio release. Despite the underperformance of Superwoman, the album earned Paulini two nominations at the Australia/New Zealand Urban Music Awards for Best Female Artist and Best R&B Album.

Throughout most of 2006, Paulini was part of the all-girl singing project Young Divas with former Australian Idol contestants Ricki-Lee Coulter, Emily Williams and Kate DeAraugo. The project was initially formed to promote a joint 17-date national tour, where all singers would perform their solo material and several songs as a group. Young Divas released a cover version of Donna Summer's 1989 single "This Time I Know It's for Real", through Sony BMG, to promote tickets for the tour. A music video was also shot to accompany the song's release. In an interview with The Sydney Morning Herald, Coulter stated "We really want to get across that we're not a group. It's four big personalities and big voices getting on stage and showing what they can do. That was the idea behind the single—kind of showing off all of our vocals, together." Young Divas' version of "This Time I Know It's for Real" peaked at number two, remained in the top-ten for 14 consecutive weeks, and was certified platinum. Five months after the single's release, Young Divas released a second single in November 2006, a cover of Lonnie Gordon's 1990 single "Happenin' All Over Again". The song peaked at number nine and was certified gold for shipments of 35,000 units. Young Divas' commercial success prompted the release of a self-titled debut album of classic disco and pop covers, on 27 November 2006, establishing themselves as an official group. The album debuted at number four and was certified double platinum for shipments of 140,000 units. A cover of Hazell Dean's 1983 hit "Searchin'" was released as the group's third single, and reached number 40.

Coulter left the Young Divas in June 2007 to resume her solo career, and was replaced by Australian Idol season four runner-up Jessica Mauboy. Their second studio album New Attitude was released on 24 November 2007, debuted at number 10 and was certified gold. The album was preceded by a cover of Loverboy's 1980 single "Turn Me Loose", which featured New Zealand rapper Savage and peaked at number 15. In December 2007, Paulini was one of the lead vocalists in the Adelaide Symphony Orchestra's gospel-style production of Handel's oratorio Messiah, alongside Trace Canini and Doug Parkinson, at the Adelaide Festival Theatre. In July 2008, Paulini collaborated with Guy Sebastian on the single "Receive the Power", which was chosen as the official anthem for the Roman Catholic Church's 2008 World Youth Day held in Sydney. "Receive the Power" was released in English and also an international version with verses in Italian, Spanish and French. Paulini and Sebastian performed both versions at the final Mass attended by 400,000 people, and also at the Pope's Farewell. In August 2008, it was announced that Paulini had decided to quit the Young Divas in order to resume her solo career. Paulini's manager at the time stated that her decision to leave the group "is totally amicable with the other girls. She just wants to continue on with her solo career. There is no animosity, there is nothing negative." Mauboy had also decided to depart, leaving DeAraugo and Williams as the only remaining members. However, both DeAraugo and Williams resumed their solo careers, and the Young Divas officially disbanded. Following Paulini's departure from the Young Divas, she ended her contract with Sony BMG.

=== 2009–2013: Songwriting and independent music releases ===
After signing a publishing deal with independent label Albert Music in 2009, Paulini began to focus more on songwriting. She attended songwriting camps in Europe, New York City and Los Angeles, and collaborated with many songwriters such as Allan Eshuijs. Paulini co-wrote songs for South African recording artist Sasha-Lee Davids, German girl group Monrose, Spanish recording artist Edurne, and The Voice France winner Yoann Fréget, among others. During February–March 2009 and again in October, Paulini alongside Christine Anu, Grace Knight and Monica Trapaga embarked on the Ladies of Jazz Tour in New South Wales, where they performed jazz classics from the '30s and '40s, as well as modern jazz hits. In November 2009, Paulini released the single "Scarless" to help raise awareness and support for White Ribbon Day, an international day to prevent violence against women. The song is based on an abusive relationship Paulini was in and was written to help other victims of domestic violence. "Scarless" marked the first time Paulini released music independently. On being an independent artist, Paulini told Auspop: "For the first time I feel like I'm in control of my music...with the independent thing, you know exactly what you're paying to who and you're in control from your music to what is written, to what you release out there—you're across it all, which is a great thing." Upon its release, "Scarless" debuted at number 18 on the AIR Independent Radio Chart. Paulini was featured on Irish recording artist Ronan Keating's 2010 single "Believe Again", which peaked at number 73 on the ARIA Singles Chart and was included on Keating's album Duet (2010).

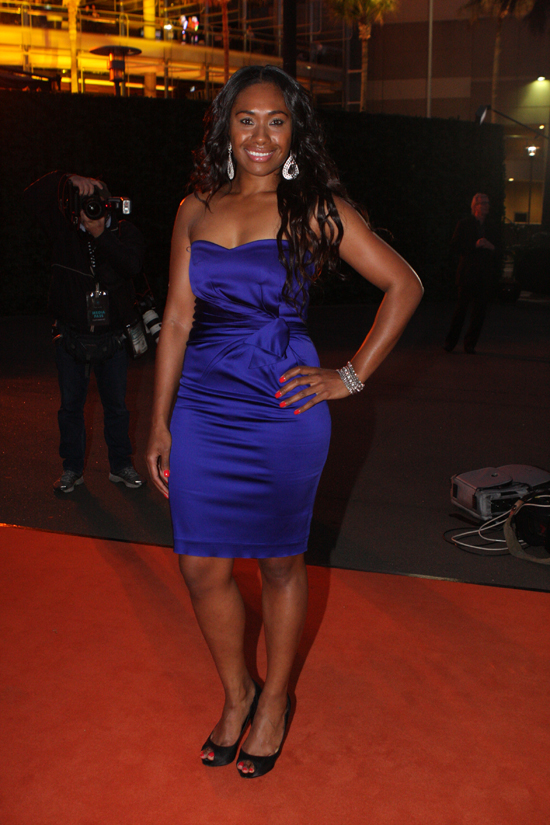
Paulini in 2011

Paulini's second independent single "Show Me Your Colors (The Ping Pong Mix)" was released as a digital download on 15 May 2011 to coincide with her performances at the 2011 Volkswagen Table Tennis Cup in China. In October 2011, Paulini reunited with Anu and Knight for more shows of their Ladies of Jazz Tour. Paulini's third independent single "Fireman" was released digitally on 10 February 2012. The song was inspired by Paulini's trip to New York, where she noticed a group of women "screaming with excitement" as a truck full of firemen drove past them. She wanted to write "a cheeky song" that celebrates the work firemen do. A music video, featuring shirtless real-life firefighters, was also shot to accompany the song's release. Paulini embarked on a club tour in Sydney, Melbourne and Brisbane throughout February and March 2012 to promote "Fireman". She also performed "Fireman" in New York at the 2012 Gay Pride event, Shark. Paulini's fourth independent single "Ping Pong with My Heart" was released only in international markets on 20 March 2012 as the official anthem for the International Table Tennis Federation. An accompanying music video for the single was also released and features scenes of Paulini playing table tennis with a love interest. She was invited to perform "Ping Pong with My Heart" at actress Susan Sarandon's New York table tennis club SPiN in June 2012. Paulini's fifth independent single "Heartbreak Is Over" was released digitally on 18 January 2013.

=== 2014–2017: Come Alive, Merry Christmas and The Bodyguard musical ===
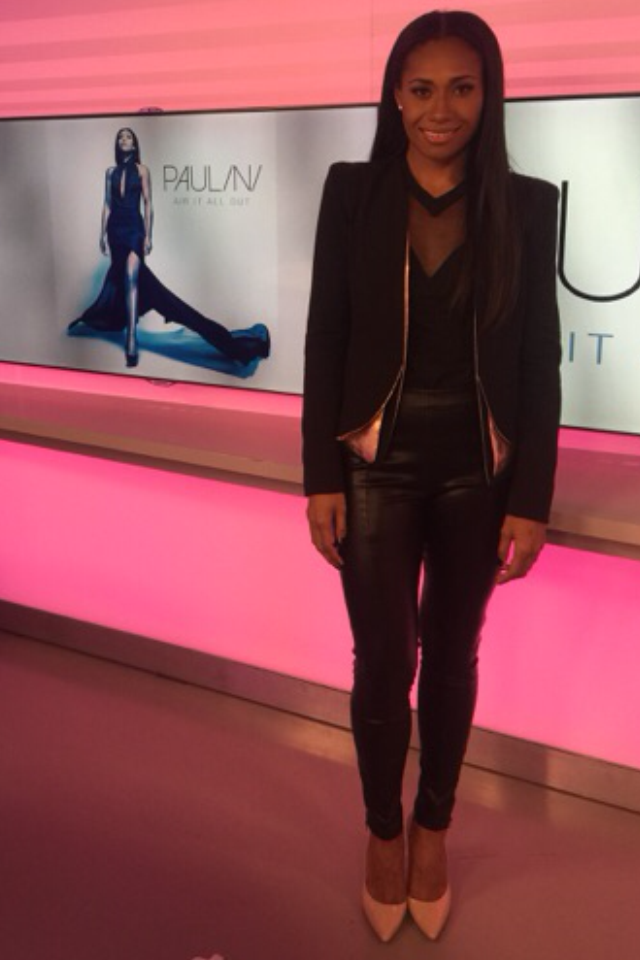
Paulini promoting her single "Air It All Out" in 2014

In 2014, Paulini signed a joint record deal with Ambition Records and Decca Records Australia. She became the first artist signed to the reactivated Decca Records label in Australia. Paulini released "Air It All Out" as the lead single from her third studio album Come Alive on 17 October 2014. Co-written by Paulini in New York, she explained that "the song is about letting go of negativity, doubt and fear—breathing in and exhaling positivity and purpose." "By My Side" was released as the second and final single from Come Alive on 15 May 2015. Co-written in Sydney by Paulini and producer Adam Reily, "By My Side" was dedicated to Paulini's older sister Litia who battled and overcame breast cancer. Paulini stated that the song is lyrically "about my journey over the past few years and coming into my skin after a struggle to find my voice, my artistry and above all, loving myself with the help of loved ones by my side." Both "Air It All Out" and "By My Side" failed to make any significant impact on the ARIA charts.

Paulini's third album Come Alive was released on 29 May 2015, almost nine years after the release of her second album Superwoman (2006). Come Alive marked a departure from Paulini's previous R&B releases, with a more commercial adult contemporary pop sound. She worked on the album for five years in Berlin, London, Los Angeles, New York City and Paris with several writers and producers, including Chris Rosa, Erik "Blue2th" Griggs and Philippe-Marc Anquetil. Paulini stated that she wanted to take her time with the album to concentrate on improving her songwriting, having co-written all but two tracks on Come Alive. Come Alive debuted at number 25 on the ARIA Albums Chart and surpassed Superwoman's peak position of number 72.

Paulini's fourth studio album Merry Christmas was released on 6 November 2015. It was Paulini's first Christmas album and second overall Christmas release, following her 2004 EP, Amazing Grace: Songs for Christmas. Paulini stated that the release was her "way of saying 'thank you'" to the fans for allowing her to perform and share the spirit of Christmas at "communities all around Australia" every year. Featuring cover versions of popular Christmas tunes, Merry Christmas failed to impact the ARIA charts. Paulini promoted the album with an eight-date tour at various Christmas carols events on the East Coast. Paulini was eventually dropped from Decca Records because both Come Alive and Merry Christmas were not commercially successful, revealing she had lost her life savings on the failed album deals.

Paulini collaborated with the Wiggles on the song "Do the Pretzel" for their 2017 album Duets, and appeared in the music video included on the DVD of the same name. In April 2017, she made her musical theatre debut in the Australian production of The Bodyguard, which is based on Whitney Houston's 1992 film of the same name. Paulini played the lead role of Rachel Marron—originally portrayed by Houston in the film—a fictional pop superstar who is stalked by a fan and falls in love with her bodyguard. Paulini took acting lessons and increased her fitness to prepare for the role, which included singing and running on the treadmill at the same time. The Bodyguard musical played shows in Sydney, Brisbane and Melbourne from April until October 2017. Paulini's performance in the musical was well received by critics and audiences.

=== 2018–present: Single releases and more musicals ===
Paulini had lost work throughout 2018 after news broke of her fake driver's licence scandal from the previous year, stating that all of her gigs after her stint in The Bodyguard musical were cancelled. She returned to the spotlight in 2019 when she was cast as one of the four star vocalists for the Australian production of the Saturday Night Fever musical, based on the 1977 film of the same name. She performed songs by the Bee Gees from the film's soundtrack for the musical at Sydney's Lyric Theatre from March to June 2019. That same year, Paulini was also cast in the Australian production of the 1960s rock musical Hair, playing the role of Dionne. The musical played shows in Perth, Geelong, Wyong, Wollongong, Sydney and the Gold Coast from August until October 2019. Paulini's singing in Hair received praise from critics. Paulini's first single in five years, "Twenty Twenty", was released to music streaming services on 11 December 2020 through Ambition Records. The song was written by Paulini and produced by Andro Martinez, whom she previously worked with at age 16. It is lyrically about the difficult year of 2020, particularly relating to the lockdowns of the COVID-19 pandemic. Paulini described "Twenty Twenty" as a "farewell 2020 anthem" with a "fun 90s vibe". OutInPerth called it "a breakup anthem for 2020...about how it’s time to cut ties with the year of lockdowns, lost work and so much antibacterial gel."

In 2021, Paulini starred in the Australian production of the Chess musical, playing the role of Russian character Svetlana Sergievskaya. For the role, she worked with an accent coach to perfect her enunciation of performing songs in a Russian accent. The musical toured Melbourne, Adelaide, Perth and Brisbane from April to June 2021. Shaad D'Souza of The Guardian felt that Paulini was "underused" in her role, but praised her singing and brief moments in the musical, writing "She brings depth and intrigue to the decidedly underwritten Svetlana, and is a much-needed anchor in the show’s second half." Paulini released the single "We Are One" on 3 February 2022 as her entry for the Eurovision – Australia Decides competition, where a combination of public and jury voting decide who would represent Australia in the 2022 Eurovision Song Contest. The disco-inspired dance track was written by Rick Price and John Capek, and lyrically speaks about acceptance and unity. When Paulini was sent "We Are One" for the competition, she tweaked some of the lyrics and reworked the track to make it sound "as current, as pop, as Eurovision and as camp as it could be". She ended up finishing in sixth place out of the eleven entries with 52 votes, and Sheldon Riley was voted to represent Australia at Eurovision.

Paulini collaborated with Australian singer-songwriter Bradley McCaw on the country-rock duet "Someone Like You", released as a single on 18 March 2022. She also recorded a cover version of the duet "I Know Him So Well" from the Chess musical with Australian soprano singer Mirusia Louwerse for Louwerse's album Songbird (2022). Their version was released as a single on 8 July 2022. That same month, Paulini was cast as one of the Divas in the Gold Coast production of the Priscilla, Queen of the Desert musical, which played shows at The Star from 16 July until 7 August 2022. Paulini later starred in the Australian production of Joseph and the Amazing Technicolor Dreamcoat as the Narrator, whose role is to narrate the musical's entire story through song. She also had additional side roles as Joseph's father Jacob, Potiphar's wife, and a Jailer. The musical played shows at Melbourne's Regent Theatre from November 2022 to January 2023, and at Sydney's Capitol Theatre from February to April 2023. Paulini's stage presence, acting and vocal performance in the musical received critical acclaim.

== Artistry ==
=== Musical style and influences ===
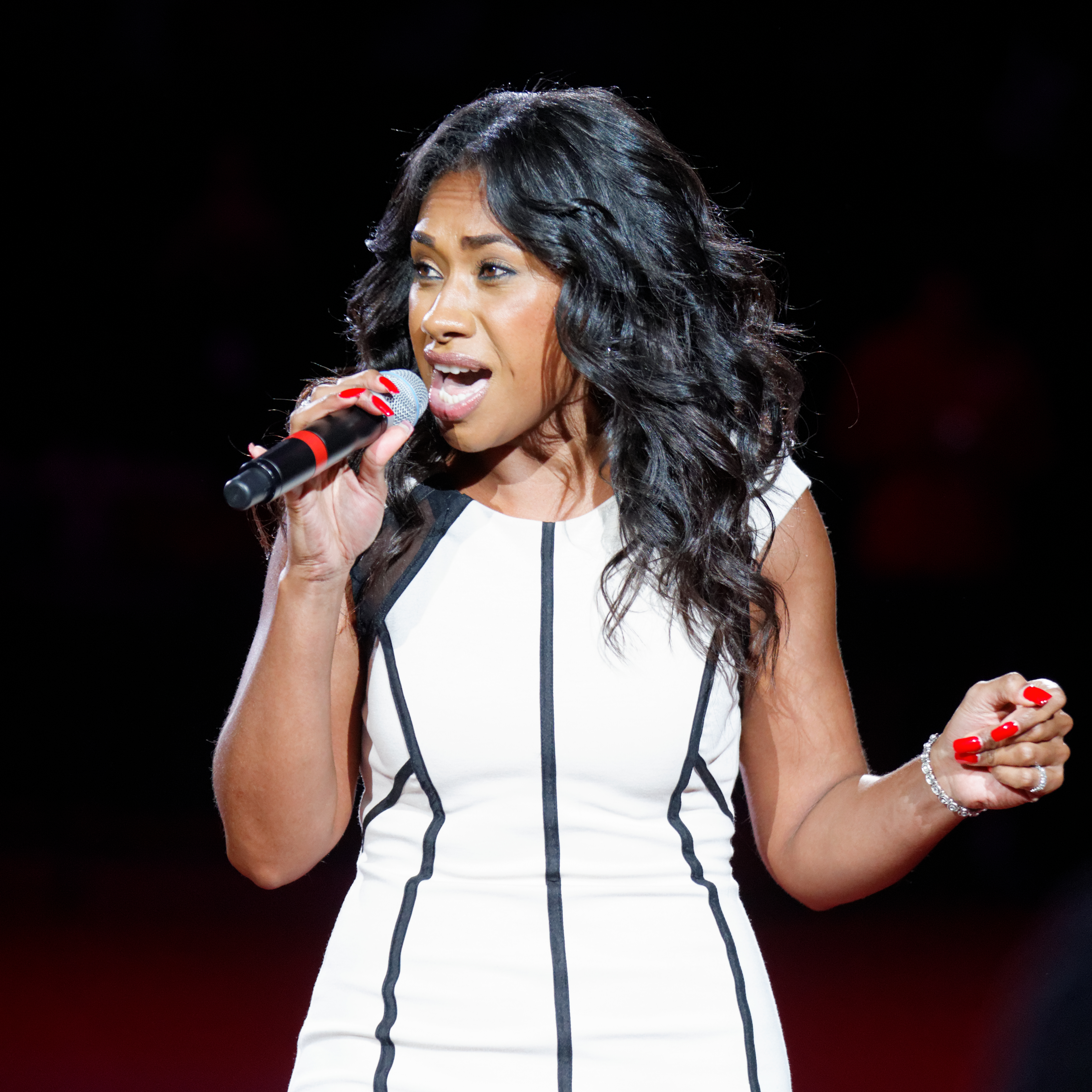
Paulini performing in 2013

Paulini possesses a five-octave vocal range. Her music has ranged from R&B, pop-soul, dance and adult contemporary pop. Paulini's debut album One Determined Heart (2004) is rooted in R&B, but also incorporates influences of soul and funk. The album was mainly a collection of cover songs, and featured only two original tracks. Paulini's second effort Superwoman (2006) is an R&B and pop-soul album with disco influences. Superwoman was her first album to be made up of entirely original material, and lyrically explored "relationships and everyday life experiences from the female perspective." Paulini experimented with dance music on her singles "Fireman" (2012), "Heartbreak Is Over" (2013) and "We Are One" (2022). Paulini stated that the dance releases was her trying to discover her sound and she was inspired to pursue the genre during a trip to Germany, where dance music is popular. Paulini explored adult contemporary pop on her third album Come Alive (2015) and shifted away from the R&B sounds of her previous albums. She described Come Alive as her most personal album, as its lyrical content are based on the personal life experiences of her and her friends. Paulini named Whitney Houston and Mariah Carey as her biggest musical influences growing up, stating that "they demanded attention when they would get up on stage and that is what I have always wanted when I get up and perform." She also cited Beyoncé as an inspiration for performing, and Oprah Winfrey for "her courage, talent and life lessons." Paulini listed Beyoncé and Aretha Franklin as vocal inspirations for her album Superwoman (2006).

=== Songwriting ===
Paulini uses life experiences her and her friends and family have gone through as inspiration for writing songs, and tries to keep the lyrics as honest as possible. She began writing songs before entering Australian Idol, but stated that she had "stopped and just did the projects I was told to do," referring to her first two albums released through Sony BMG. Paulini had no songwriting credits on her debut album One Determined Heart (2004), and co-wrote only two tracks on her second album Superwoman (2006). In an interview with The Sydney Morning Herald, Paulini revealed that she felt manufactured with her first two albums, saying: "You kind of actually feel trapped because when they would ask you to make an album, they'd have a list of songs ready for you to choose from. It was like a massive list of just songs that other people have written that you can just kind of go, 'Oh yeah. I like that one. I like the sound of this.' It just didn't seem real. I mean, it wasn't real for me. They were all great songs and written by awesome writers. But, they weren't my words and my experiences; I didn't feel like it belonged to me." Paulini was heavily involved with the songwriting on her third album Come Alive (2015), having co-written all but two tracks on the album. She referred to Come Alive as her first real album as she took her time working on it, explaining that with "this one, this is me. Every experience in there is me, it's what I've gone through, or what I've interpreted from my point of view with other situations with my friends and family."

After signing a publishing deal with independent label Albert Music in 2009, Paulini began writing songs for other recording artists. She co-wrote "I'm Only Human" for German recording artist Cherine Nouri's album So Alive (2009), the 2011 single "Touching a Stranger" for Allan Eshuijs' project Wildboyz, and the 2014 single "Just Like You" for The Voice Philippines finalist Jessica Reynoso. She also co-wrote "Definition of a Woman" for both South African recording artist Sasha-Lee Davids and German girl group Monrose. "Scarless" was translated into Spanish ("Culpable") for Spanish recording artist Edurne's album Nueva Piel (2010). Another song Paulini wrote, "Good Morning, Good People", was translated into French ("Bienvenue dans ma maison") for The Voice France winner Yoann Fréget's debut album, Quelques heures avec moi (2014).

== Other ventures ==
=== Television appearances ===
On 26 November 2004, Paulini made a guest appearance in the Australian soap opera Home and Away as herself. In the episode, Paulini performs her single "We Can Try" at the opening of Summer Bay's new bar Noah's, and later performs "Silent Night" at the christening for Sally Fletcher's (Kate Ritchie) baby. Paulini appeared as a contestant in the first season of the Australian lifestyle reality series Celebrity Overhaul in February 2005, alongside six other celebrities. On the show, celebrities went through a six-week course of fitness and lifestyle retraining. In May 2006, Paulini joined the first season of the celebrity singing show It Takes Two, where 10 non-singing celebrities are paired up with 10 professional singers to compete in a duet-singing showdown in order to impress a panel of judges and the viewing public to survive potential elimination. Paulini was paired up with television presenter Simon Reeve, and they placed sixth in the competition. For the second season of It Takes Two in May 2007, she was paired up with television presenter Lochie Daddo and they were the first couple to be eliminated from the competition. Paulini made her acting debut in the television film Sisters of War, which premiered on ABC1 on 14 November 2010. The film is based on the true story of a group of Australian nuns and nurses held by the Japanese as prisoners of war at the Catholic mission station Vunapope, on the Papua New Guinea island of New Britain in 1942. Paulini played the supporting role of islander nun Sister Marie, who she described as caring and strong. In preparing for the role, Paulini spoke with nuns who had been through World War II experiences and read books on one of the film's other characters, Sister Berenice Twohill. During one scene in the film, Paulini's character sings a Latin requiem in Papua New Guinean dialect while standing beside a huge cross, after death has come to the mission during an aircraft attack.

In 2019, Paulini appeared as the Spider contestant on the first season of The Masked Singer Australia, being eliminated in finals week. In 2021, Paulini appeared as a contestant on the seventh series of I’m A Celebrity…Get Me Out Of Here! Australia, and was the fifth contestant to be eliminated. In 2023, Paulini was announced as one of the celebrity contestants set to compete in the twentieth series of Dancing with the Stars Australia.

=== Philanthropy ===
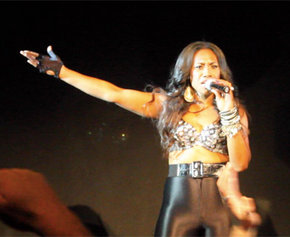
Paulini performing at a Sydney nightclub in October 2011

Throughout her career, Paulini has supported various charities in Australia. She has also performed at many fundraising events over the years, including the annual Channel Seven Perth Telethon, as well as annual Christmas carols events such as Carols in the Domain, Carols by Candlelight and Carols in the City. Paulini performed at the Olivia Newton-John and Friends Charity Gala Concert, held in September 2008 at Sydney's State Theatre to raise funds for Newton-John's Cancer and Wellness Centre.

In 2010, she became an ambassador for The Global Good Foundation, a charity organisation campaigning against domestic violence. That same year, she was part of the Dueting It for the Kids Concert at the State Theatre, where she performed a duet with Leo Sayer. All proceeds from the concert went to The Australian Children's Music Foundation, which "provides inspiration and hope to Australia's indigenous and disadvantaged children." Paulini performed at the launch of the 2012 Australian Firefighters Calendar and was the ambassador for the 2012 World Firefighters Games held in Sydney; money raised from both events went to the burns unit at Westmead Children's Hospital. On 30 November 2014, Paulini headlined an annual charity event for World AIDS Day at the Brisbane gay nightclub Fluffy; all door profits from the event went to a local charity supporting local people with aids. In 2015, Paulini became an ambassador for Running Heroes, an online community for runners to help them achieve their goals. She performed at the first Barnardos Beach Bolt held at Coogee Beach on 14 June 2015, and all proceeds from the racing event went to Barnardos Australia, a child protection charity helping to stop child abuse. Paulini was a 2016 ambassador for Wellness Walk, a yearly walking event at the Sydney Harbour Bridge that "raises awareness for mental illness and encourages walking as a way to improve mental wellness."

Paulini's charity of choice for her time on I'm a Celebrity...Get Me Out of Here! was the Prostete Cancer Foundation of Australia.

== Personal life ==
Paulini was raised in a devout Christian family.

She officially became an Australian citizen on 21 March 2013 at a special ceremony in Canberra that coincided with Harmony Day.

Following years of struggling with her weight, Paulini showcased a new slimmer physique in 2014 after going from a size 16 to a size 10. She credits the weight loss to eating healthy, running, going to the gym, "sleeping early and not staying up till late hours at night."

Paulini is based in Sydney. She had been living with her sister Litia in a shared apartment in Matraville, New South Wales in 2014.

Paulini's father Isireli died on 17 September 2020 after losing his battle with prostate cancer.

Paulini is a supporter of the LGBTI community and has a gay following in Australia. Over the years, she has performed at many gay nightclubs and LGBTI-related events, including New York City Pride and the Sydney Gay and Lesbian Mardi Gras. She told the Star Observer: "the community has always been so good to me. They're the loudest and the ones right behind me."

=== Bribery charges ===
In June 2017, Paulini was charged with "corruptly giving a benefit to an agent", after she paid AU$850 to a Roads & Maritime Services (RMS) employee for a fake, NSW open driver licence, despite not being qualified to drive. Her learner licence was suspended in March 2016 after she was caught driving unaccompanied and without L-plates displayed. She then spoke with an employee at a Mount Druitt RMS office in July 2016, who added an American driver licence number to Paulini's records and issued an open NSW licence for her. The employee had already been under investigation by police for distributing fake driver licences. She pleaded guilty to the offence on 4 September 2017. She already had 11 driving offences, despite having only held a learner licence since 2002. On 15 December 2017, Paulini avoided jail time and was instead given a six-month suspended sentence. She was placed on a good behaviour bond until 14 June 2018.

=== Relationships ===
Paulini began dating Fijian-Australian professional rugby league player Wes Naiqama in 2006. Their relationship made news headlines beginning in July 2006 when she was spotted with bruises, which prompted her parents to lodge a formal complaint to Naiqama's St George Illawarra Dragons club about the couple's personal issues. That same month, police were called after Naiqama verbally abused Paulini outside a nightclub in Darlinghurst. They were involved in another argument at a Double Bay restaurant in September 2006, where Naiqama was seen punching a wall. In May 2007, Paulini's manager at the time confirmed that the couple had split. Paulini told The Daily Telegraph that despite their split, they managed to maintain a friendship, and that she vowed to keep her personal relationships in the future "very, very low key" out of the spotlight.

Her 2009 single "Scarless" was written about her abusive relationship with Naiqama to help other victims who have been through domestic violence.

Between 2016 and 2017, Paulini was in a relationship with a man named Brock Hunter, whom she met at a health and fitness boot camp in Thailand. Hunter had lived on the Gold Coast, and Paulini would visit him on her days off from work. She told the Gold Coast Bulletin that Hunter was not in the sports or entertainment industry.

== Discography ==
- One Determined Heart (2004)
- Superwoman (2006)
- Come Alive (2015)
- Merry Christmas (2015)

== Tours ==
Headlining

- Club Tour (2012)
- East Coast Christmas Tour (2015)
- The Bodyguard Musical Tour (2017)

Co-headlining

- Young Divas Tour with Ricki-Lee Coulter, Emily Williams and Kate DeAraugo (2006)
- Ladies of Jazz Tour with Christine Anu, Grace Knight and Monica Trapaga (2009, 2011)

Supporting act

- Human Nature's East Coast Tour (2004)
- Tina Arena's Greatest Hits Tour (2004)
- Guy Sebastian's Beautiful Life Tour (2005)

== Filmography ==
Year	Title	Role	Notes
2001	StarStruck	Herself	Winner
2003	Australian Idol	Herself	Fourth place contestant (season 1)
2004	Home and Away	Herself	Guest appearance (1 episode)
2005	Celebrity Overhaul	Herself	Celebrity contestant (season 1)
2006–07	It Takes Two	Herself	Mentor (seasons 1–2)
2010	Sisters of War	Sister Marie	Television film; supporting role
2019	The Masked Singer Australia	Herself	Fifth place contestant (season 1)
2021	I'm a Celebrity...Get Me Out of Here! Australia	Herself	Tenth place contestant (season 7)
2023	Dancing with the Stars Australia	Herself	Contestant (season 20)

== Theatre ==
Year	Title	Role(s)	Notes
2017	The Bodyguard	Rachel Marron	Australian production
2019	Saturday Night Fever	Star vocalist	Australian production
2019	Hair	Dionne	Australian production
2021	Chess	Svetlana Sergievskaya	Australian production
2022	Priscilla, Queen of the Desert	Diva	Gold Coast production
2022–23	Joseph and the Amazing Technicolor Dreamcoat	Narrator / Jacob / Potiphar's wife / Jailer	Australian production

== Awards and nominations ==
Year	Type	Recipient	Award	Result
2004	ARIA No. 1 Chart Awards	"Angel Eyes"	ARIA No. 1 Single	Won
2004	ARIA No. 1 Chart Awards	One Determined Heart	ARIA No. 1 Album	Won
2004	ARIA Music Awards	"Angel Eyes"	Highest Selling Single	Nominated
2006	Australia/New Zealand Urban Music Awards	Paulini	Best Female Artist	Nominated
2006	Nickelodeon Australian Kids' Choice Awards	Young Divas	Fave Group	Nominated
2006	Nickelodeon Australian Kids' Choice Awards	"This Time I Know It's for Real" with Young Divas	Fave Song	Won
2007	Australia/New Zealand Urban Music Awards	Superwoman	Best R&B Album	Nominated
2007	Australia/New Zealand Urban Music Awards	Paulini	Best Female Artist	Nominated
2012	Poprepublic.tv Awards	"Fireman"	Favourite Single of 2012	Nominated
2012	Poprepublic.tv Awards	Paulini	Favourite Australian Female Artist	Nominated
2015	Poprepublic.tv Awards	Come Alive	Favourite Album of 2015	Nominated
2015	Poprepublic.tv Awards	Paulini	Favourite Australian Female Artist	Nominated
2016	Poprepublic.tv Awards	Paulini	Favourite Australian Female Artist	Nominated
