= Rough Day =

Single by Paulini

from the album Superwoman
- Released: 22 January 2006
- Recorded: 2005; Los Angeles, California
- Genre: Pop, R&B
- Length: 3:28
- Label: Sony BMG
- Songwriter(s): Bridget Benenate, Matthew Gerrard, Franne Golde
- Producer(s): Audius Mtawarira

Paulini singles chronology
"We Can Try" (2004)	"Rough Day" (2006)	"So Over You" (2006)

"Rough Day" is a song by Australian recording artist Paulini, taken from her second studio album, Superwoman (2006). It was written by Bridget Benenate, Matthew Gerrard and Franne Golde, while the production was handled by Audius Mtawarira. "Rough Day" was released physically on 22 January 2006, as the lead single from the album. The song peaked at number 26 on the ARIA Singles Chart and number three on the ARIA Dance Chart. The retro style-themed music video was directed by Jonathan and Josh Baker.

== Background and reception ==
"Rough Day" was written by Bridget Benenate, Matthew Gerrard and Franne Golde, while the production was handled by Audius Mtawarira. The song was recorded in Los Angeles, California. It was sent to Australian radio stations on 5 December 2005, and released as a CD single on 22 January 2006. A writer for Destra Media described "Rough Day" as "a carefree and contagious party starter" that showcases "the sheer class of Paulini's vocal performance". The song debuted and peaked on the ARIA Singles Chart at number 26 on 23 January 2006. "Rough Day" had a better impact on the ARIA Dance Chart, where it peaked at number three.

== Music video ==
The accompanying music video for "Rough Day" was directed by twin brothers Jonathan and Josh Baker. The video features Paulini in the kitchen as she gets ready for work, in a hairdressing salon with her friends, at a bus stop and then on the dancefloor wearing a leopard print dress. A writer for Destra Media described the video as "an absolutely stellar and very groovy retro styled".

== Track listing ==
- CD single
1. "Rough Day" – 3:29
2. "Rough Day (Disco D Remix)" – 3:56
3. "Rough Day" (Blue Planet Reality club Mix) – 6:27
4. "Last Love" – 3:04

== Charts ==
Chart (2006)	Peak position
ARIA Singles Chart	26
ARIA Dance Chart	3
