= We Can Try =

2004 single by Paulini

Single by Paulini

from the album One Determined Heart
- Released: 4 October 2004
- Length: 3:59
- Label: Columbia
- Songwriters: Jeneya Carr; Audius Mtawarira
- Producer: Audius Mtawarira

Paulini singles chronology
"Angel Eyes" (2004)	"We Can Try" (2004)	"Rough Day" (2006)

"We Can Try" is a song by Australian recording artist Paulini, taken from her debut studio album, One Determined Heart (2004). It was written by Jeneya Carr and Audius Mtawarira, who also produced the song. "We Can Try" was released physically on 4 October 2004, as the second single from the album. The song peaked at number 30 on the ARIA Singles Chart. The music video was shot in a sepia tone.

== Track listing ==
Australian CD single

1. "We Can Try" – 3:42
2. "We Can Try" (Four 2 the Floor mix) – 3:43
3. "Angel Eyes" (Silvertongue mix) – 4:00
4. "The Live 'Idol' Medley" – 5:03

== Charts ==
Chart (2004)	Peak position
Australia (ARIA)	30
