= The Masked Singer (Australian TV series) season 1 =

The Masked Singer
- Season 1
- Presented by: Osher Günsberg
- Judges: Jackie O; Lindsay Lohan; Dave Hughes; Dannii Minogue
- No. of contestants: 12
- Winner: Cody Simpson as "Robot"
- Runner-up: Rob Mills as "Wolf"
- No. of episodes: 10

Release
- Original network: Network 10
- Original release: 23 September – 21 October 2019

Season chronology
- Next → Season 2

The first season of The Masked Singer Australia premiered on Monday 23 September 2019 on Network 10 and is hosted by Osher Günsberg. In the Grand Finale on 21 October 2019, it was announced that the winner was Cody Simpson (who competed as “Robot”), the runner-up Rob Mills (who competed as “Wolf), and the third place finisher was Gorgi Coghlan (who competed as “Monster”).

The show involved 10 episodes and was filmed at Fox Studios Australia.

== Production ==
The costumes were designed and created by Australian Academy Award and BAFTA Award-Winning costume designer Tim Chappel, who is best known for his work on The Adventures of Priscilla, Queen of the Desert with Lizzy Gardiner.

The winner, Cody Simpson, received the highest combined audience and panellist votes thereby winning the show.

== Panellists and host ==
Season 1 panellists and host

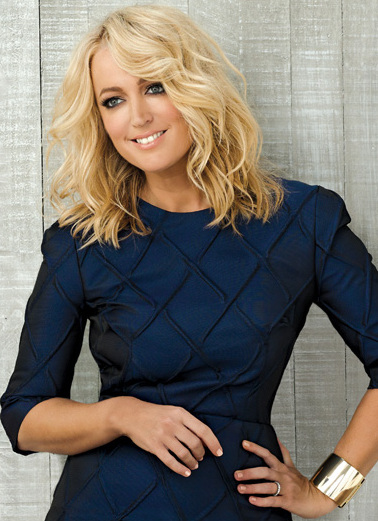
Jackie O

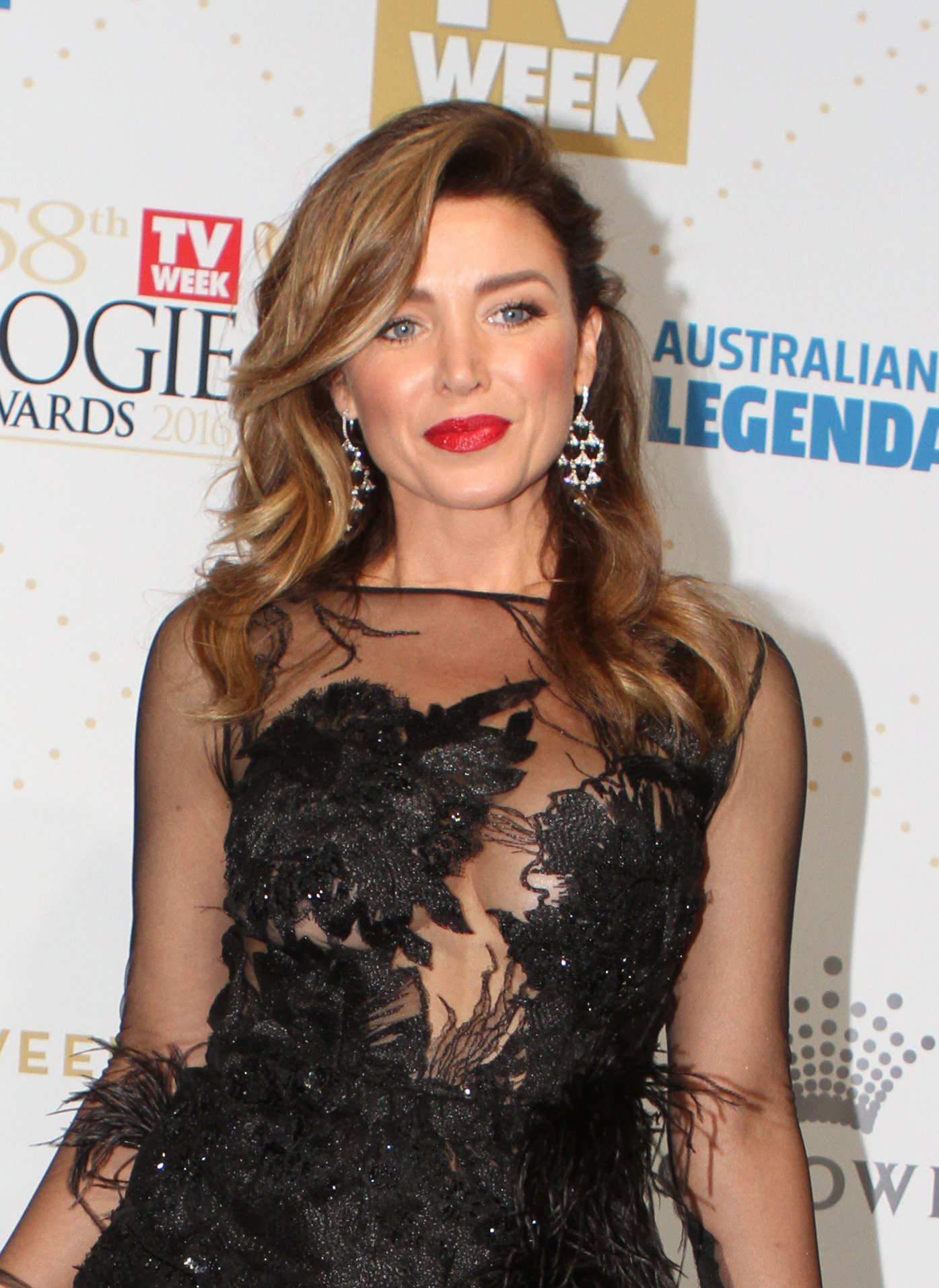
Dannii Minogue

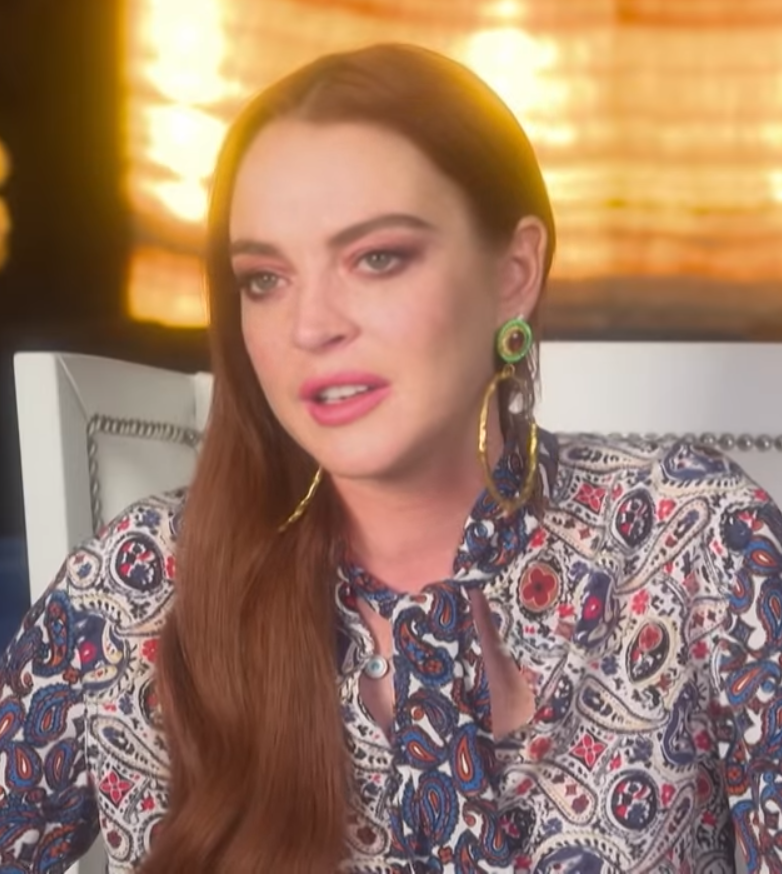
Lindsay Lohan

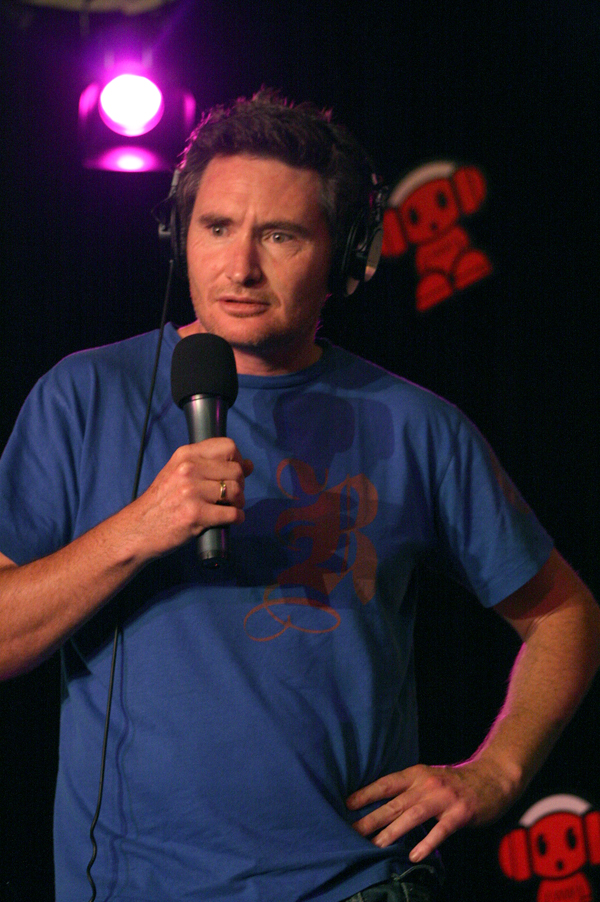
Dave Hughes

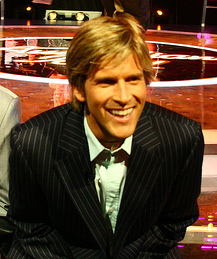
Osher Günsberg

Following the announcement of the series, it was confirmed by Network 10 that the judging panel would consist of radio personality Jackie O, singer-songwriter Dannii Minogue, international actress and singer-songwriter Lindsay Lohan and comedian Dave Hughes. It was also confirmed that Osher Günsberg would host the show.

Throughout the season, guest panellists appeared as a fifth judge on the judging panel. The guest panellists in the first season were comedians Nazeem Hussain (episode 4) and Luke McGregor (episode 5).

== Contestants ==
In the first season, there were 12 competitors in the competition. Before the season began, ten released clues that it included ARIA Music Awards winners, an MTV Award winner, Logie Awards winner, 'Hall of Famers', an Order of Australia recipient and a World Cup winner.

Stage name	Celebrity	Occupation	Episodes								
Stage name	Celebrity	Occupation	1	2	3	4	5	6	7	8	10
Robot	Cody Simpson	Singer	WIN		SAFE		SAFE		SAFE	SAFE	WINNER
Wolf	Rob Mills	Actor	RISK		SAFE		SAFE		SAFE	SAFE	RUNNER-UP
Monster	Gorgi Coghlan	TV Presenter		WIN		SAFE		SAFE	SAFE	SAFE	THIRD
Unicorn	Deni Hines	Singer	WIN			SAFE		SAFE	SAFE	OUT	
Spider	Paulini	Singer		WIN		SAFE		SAFE	SAFE	OUT	
Lion	Kate Ceberano	Singer		WIN	SAFE		SAFE		OUT		
Dragon	Adam Brand	Singer		RISK		SAFE		OUT			
Prawn	Darren McMullen	TV Presenter	WIN		SAFE		OUT				
Rhino	Wendell Sailor	Rugby Player		RISK		OUT					
Alien	Nikki Webster	Singer	RISK		OUT						
Parrot	Brett Lee	Cricketer		OUT							
Octopus	Gretel Killeen	Comedian	OUT								

The masked singer won their face-off and remained in the competition.
The masked singer lost their face-off, but was saved by the judges and, therefore, not eliminated.
The masked singer was safe from elimination.
The masked singer was eliminated from the competition and unmasked upon their elimination.
The masked singer did not perform.

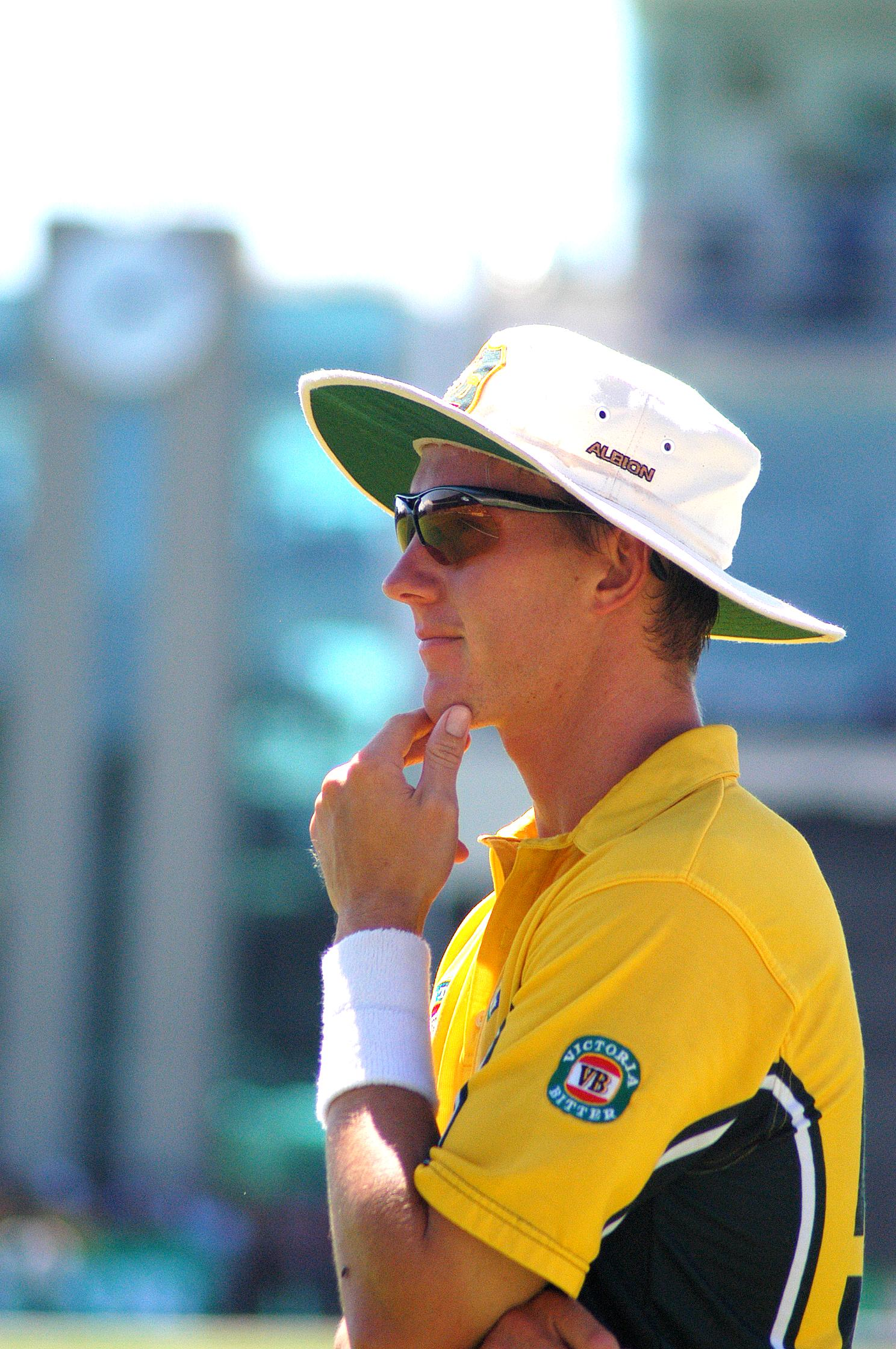
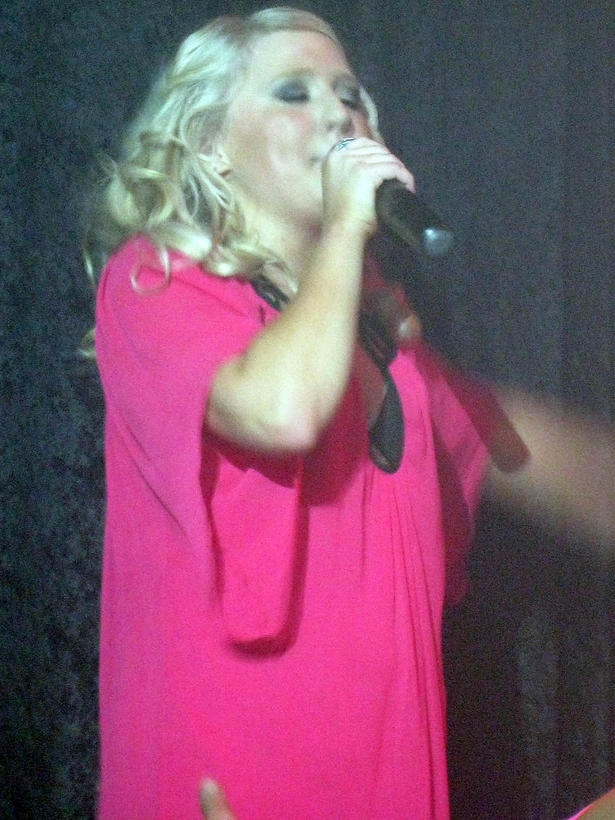
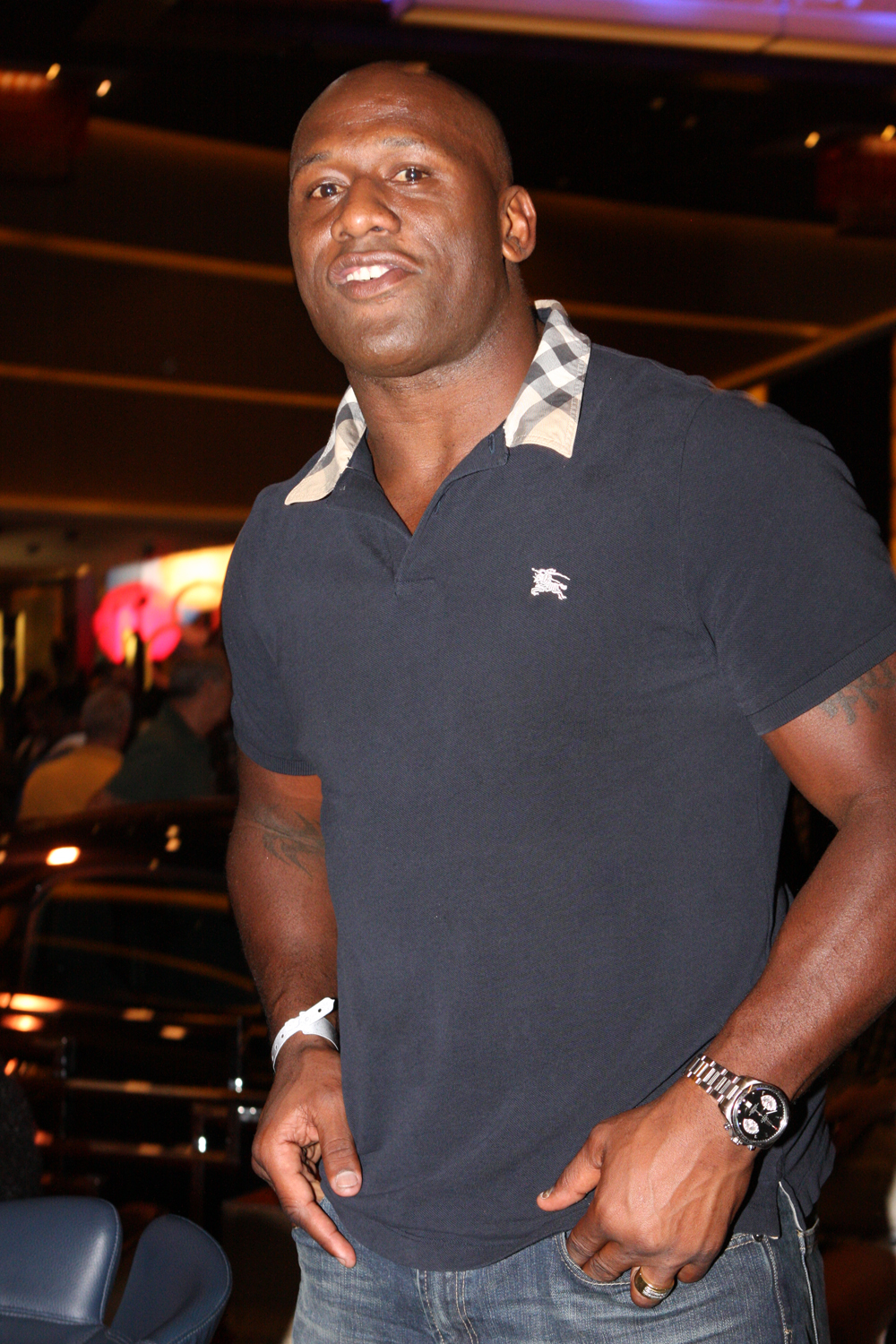
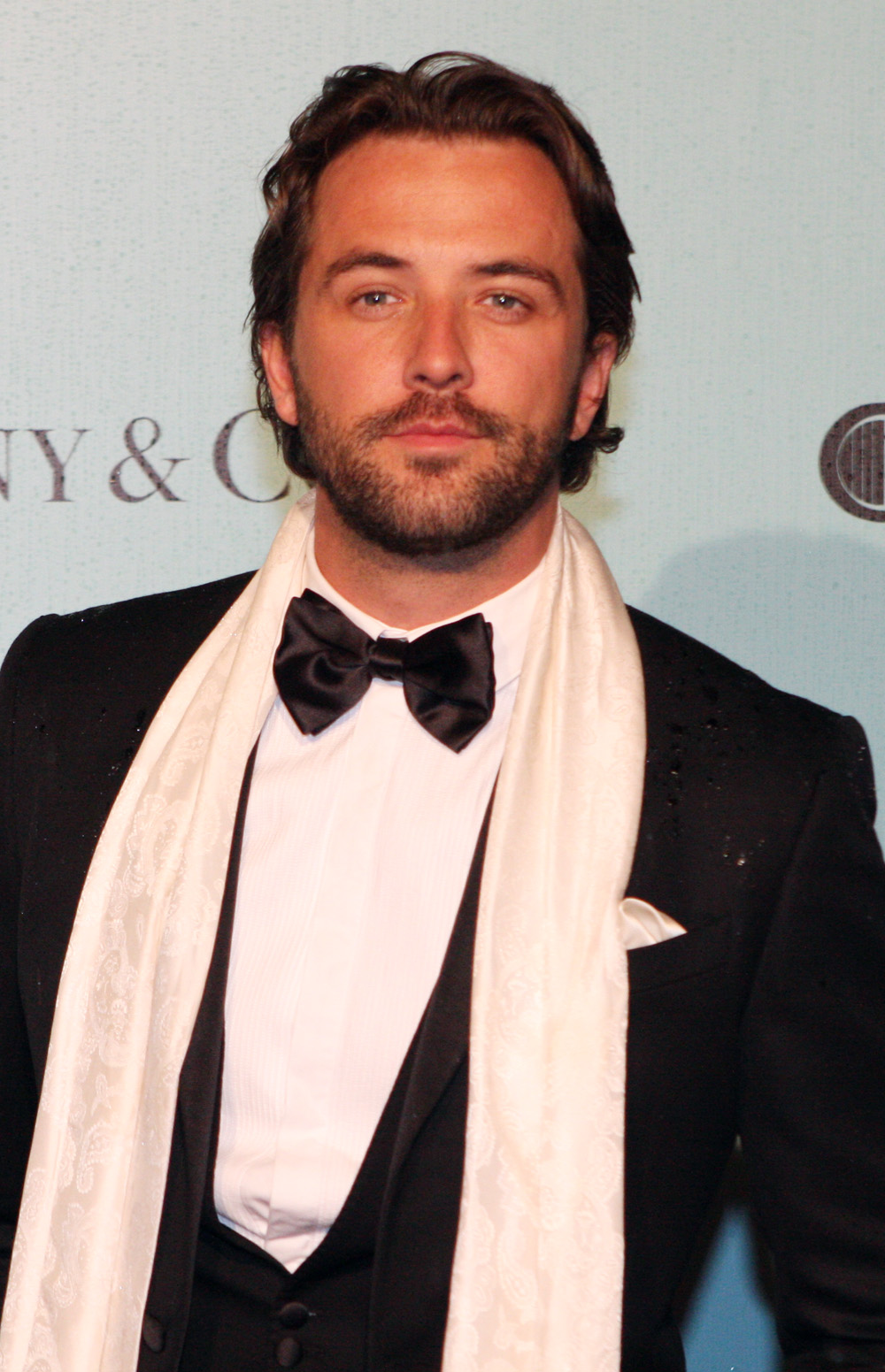
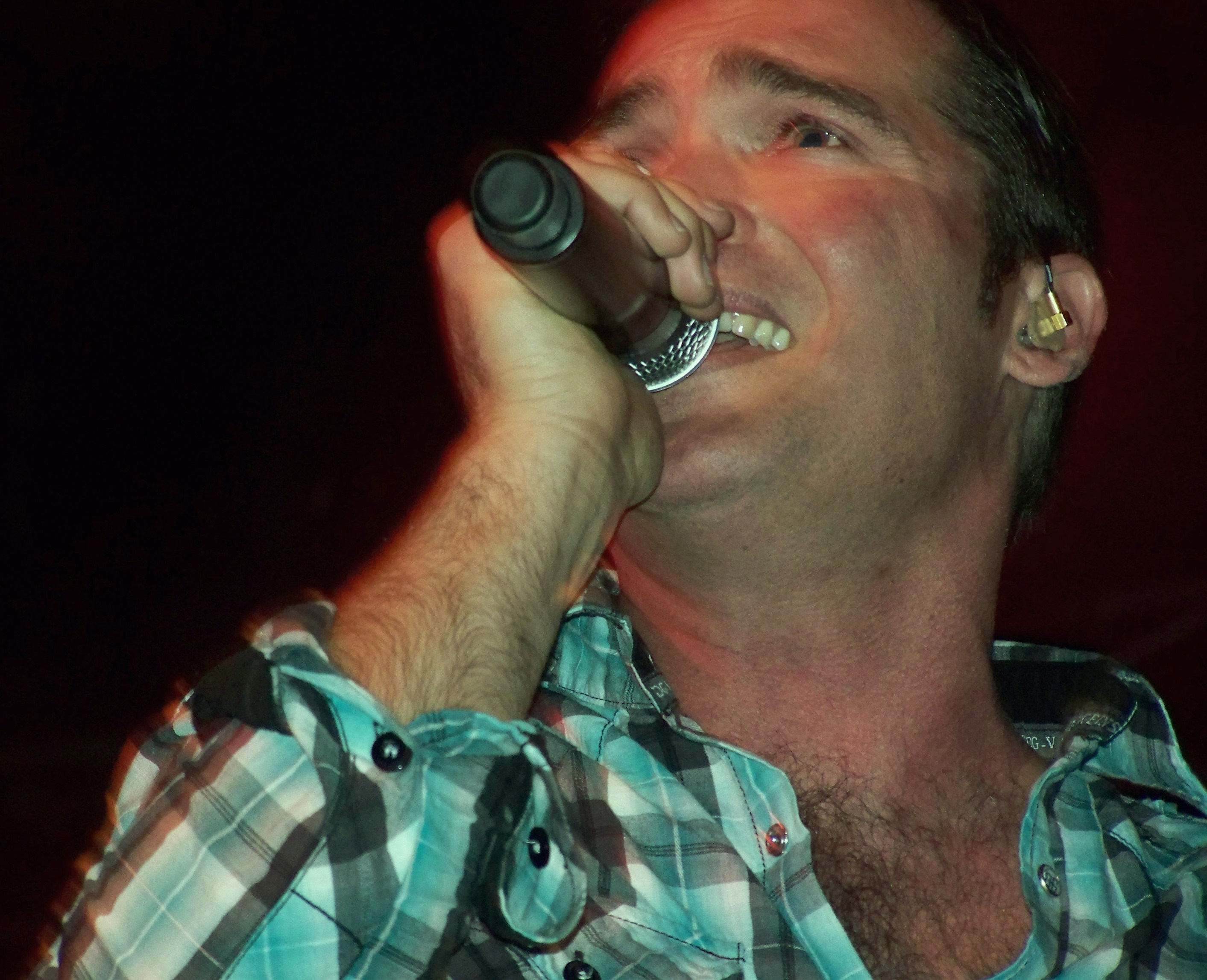
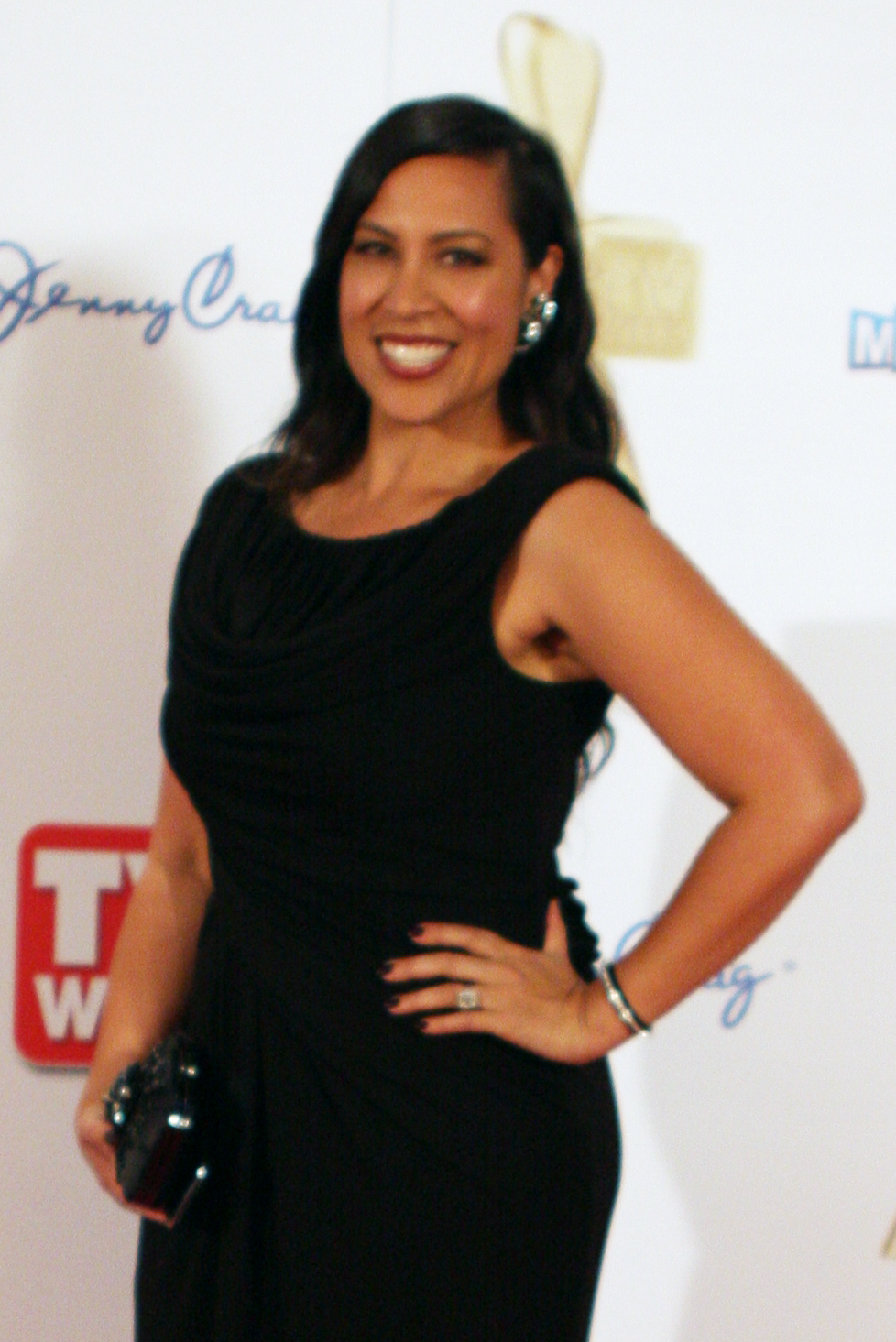
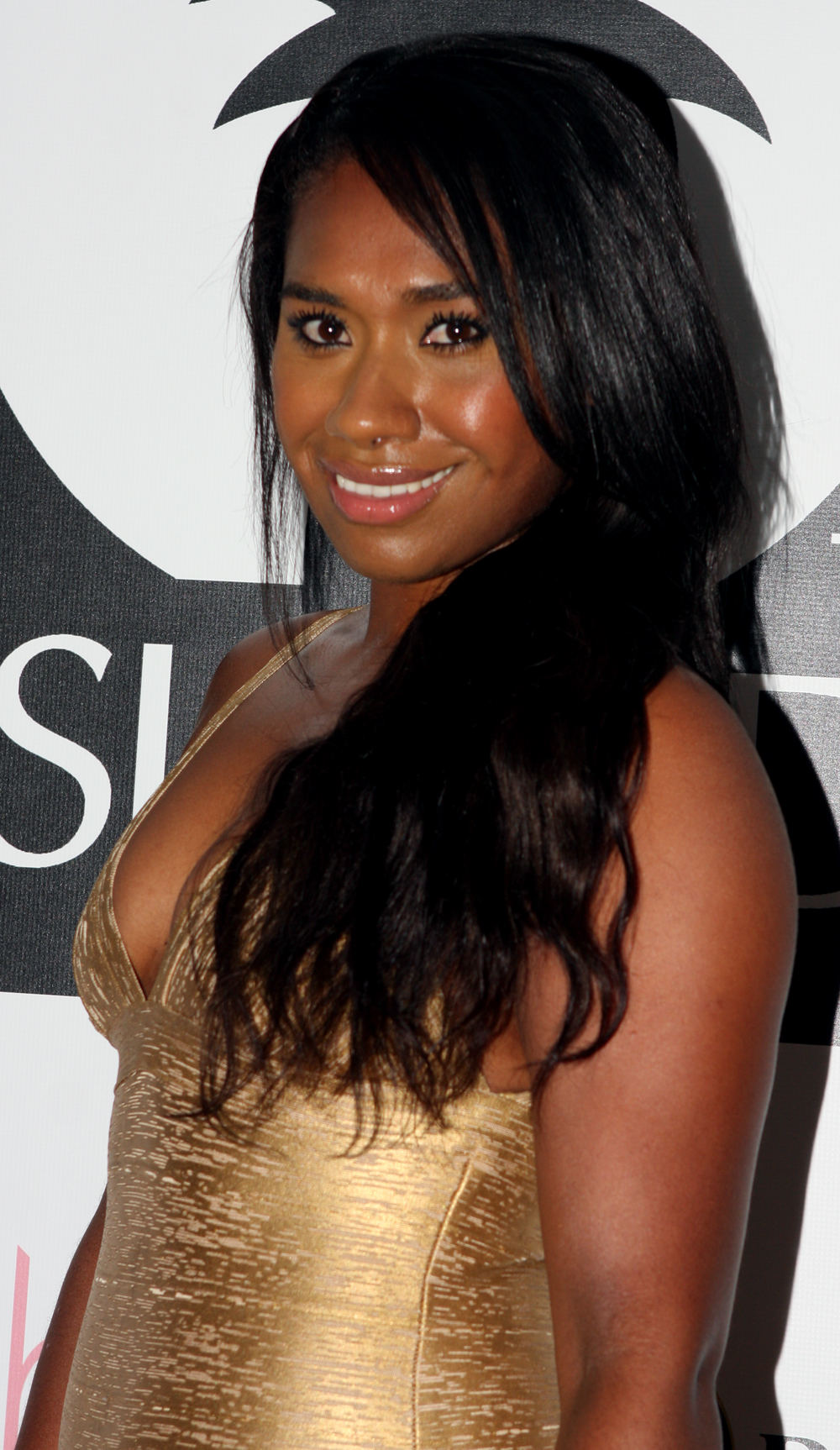
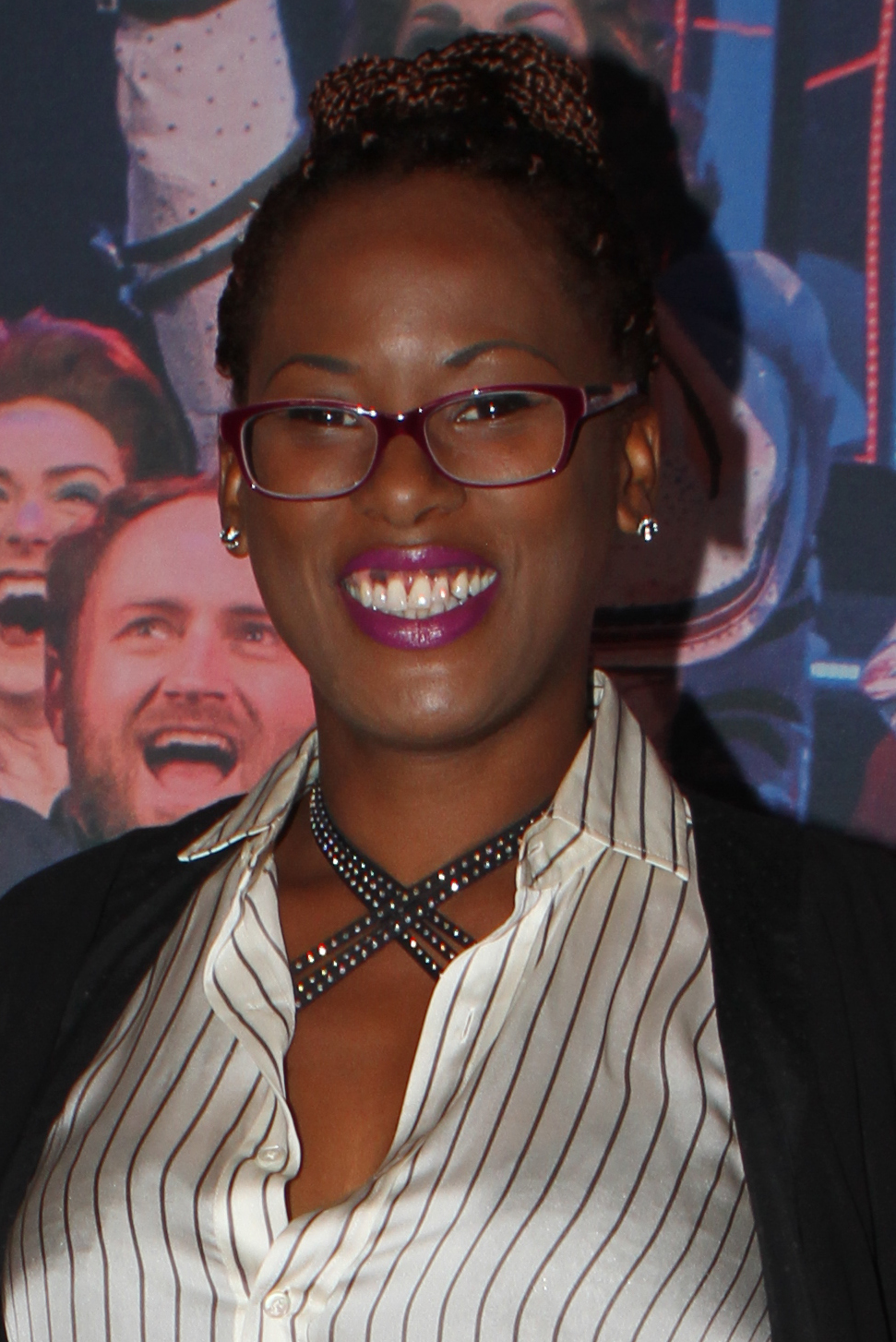
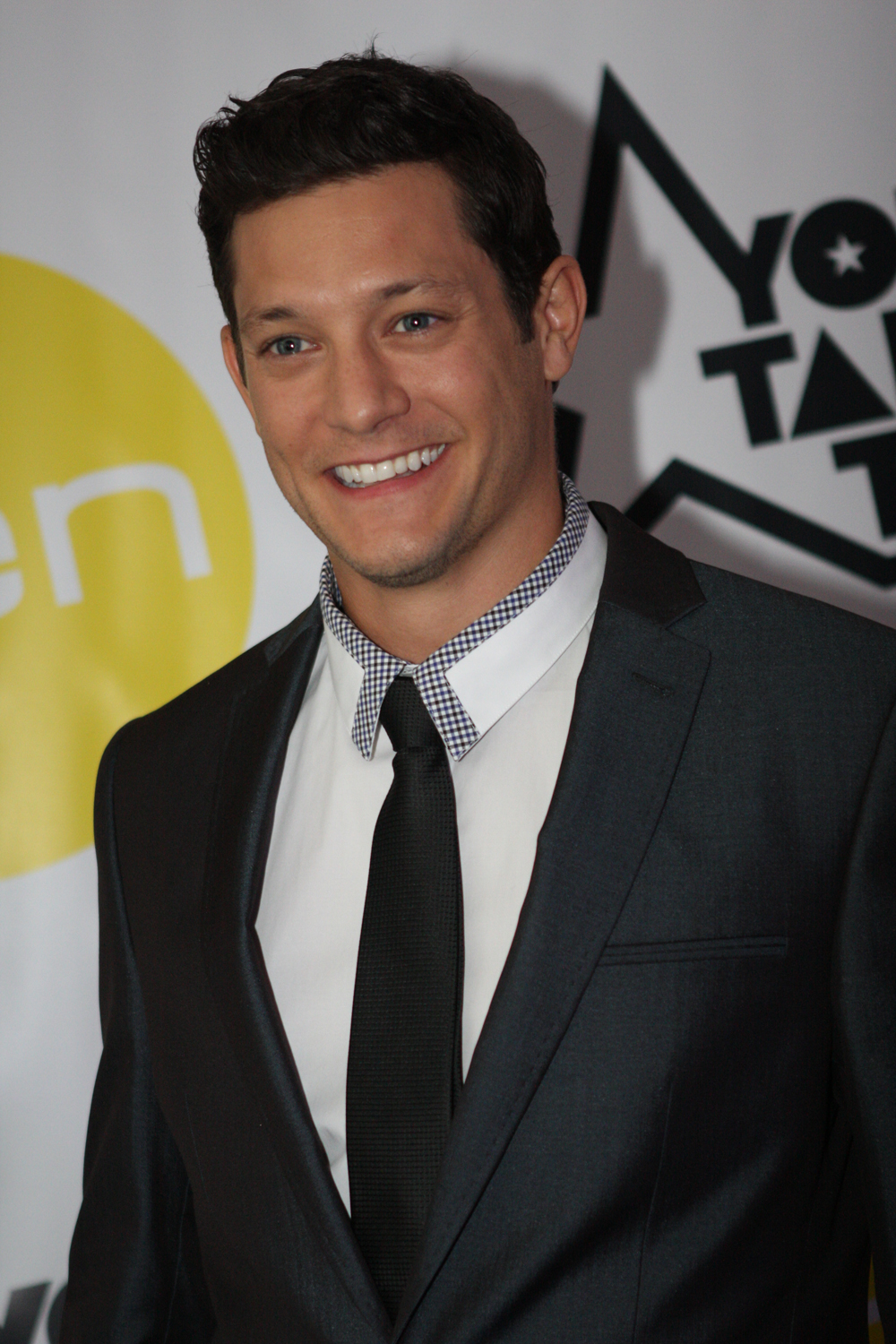
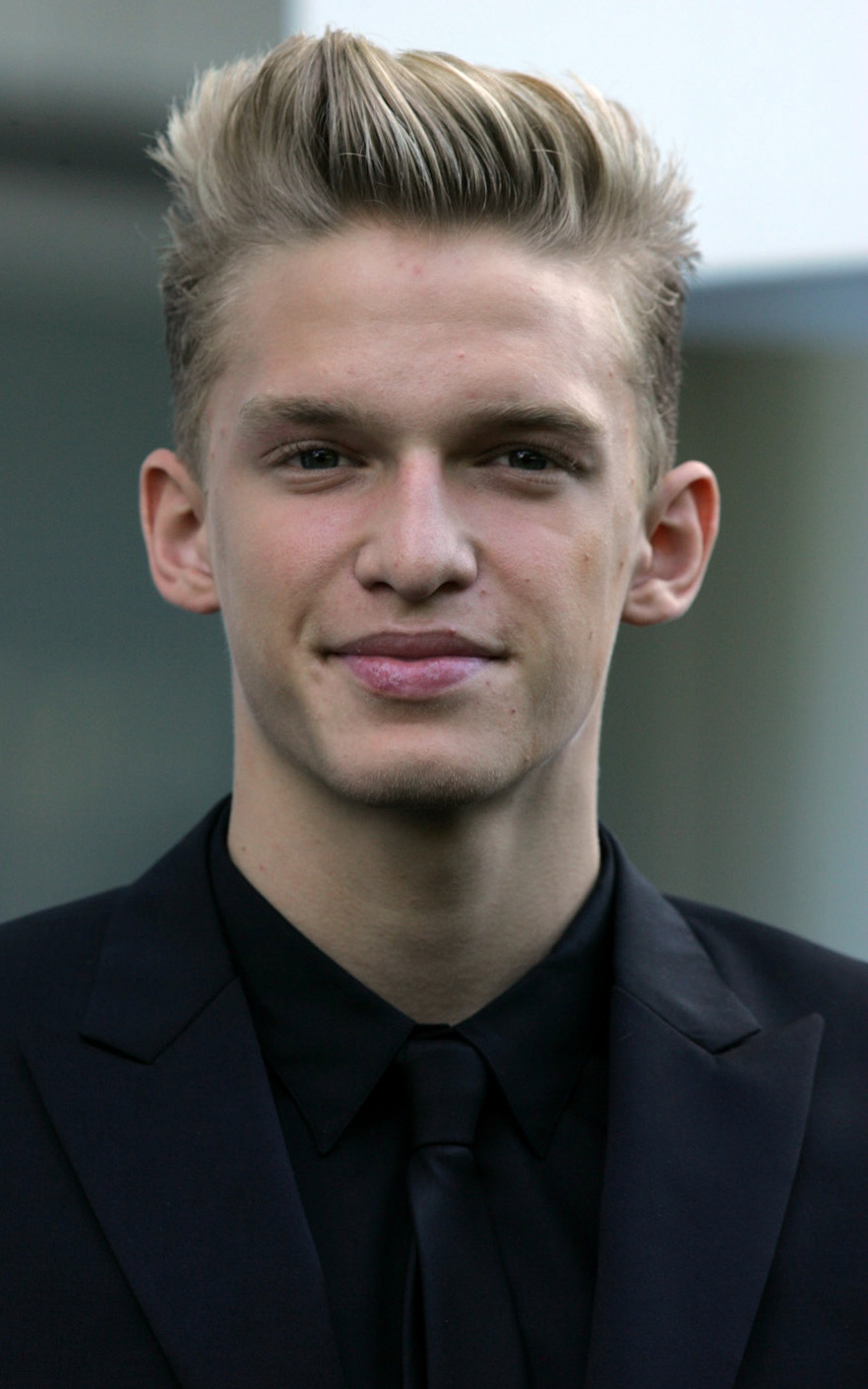
The celebrities who competed in the first season of The Masked Singer Australia, pictured in order of elimination (l-r):

Brett Lee ("Parrot"), Nikki Webster ("Alien"), Wendell Sailor ("Rhino"), Darren McMullen ("Prawn"), Adam Brand ("Dragon"), Kate Ceberano ("Lion"), Paulini ("Spider"), Deni Hines ("Unicorn"), Rob Mills ("Wolf") and Cody Simpson ("Robot")

Not pictured: Gretel Killeen ("Octopus") and Gorgi Coghlan ("Monster")

== Episodes ==
=== Episode 1 (23 September) ===
Performances on the first episode
#	Stage name	Song	Identity	Result
1	Prawn	"Suspicious Minds" by Elvis Presley	undisclosed	WIN
2	Alien	"Born this Way" by Lady Gaga	undisclosed	RISK
3	Octopus	"Fame" by Irene Cara	Gretel Killeen	OUT
4	Robot	"Hold Back the River" by James Bay	undisclosed	WIN
5	Unicorn	"Perfect" by Ed Sheeran	undisclosed	WIN
6	Wolf	"Man! I Feel Like a Woman!" by Shania Twain	undisclosed	RISK

=== Episode 2 (24 September) ===
Performances on the second episode
#	Stage name	Song	Identity	Result
1	Dragon	"Geronimo" by Sheppard	undisclosed	RISK
2	Monster	"Think" by Aretha Franklin	undisclosed	WIN
3	Parrot	"What's My Scene?" by Hoodoo Gurus	Brett Lee	OUT
4	Spider	"Toxic" by Britney Spears and 2WEI	undisclosed	WIN
5	Rhino	"Shotgun" by George Ezra	undisclosed	RISK
6	Lion	"High Hopes" by Panic! at the Disco	undisclosed	WIN

=== Episode 3 (30 September) ===
Performances on the third episode
#	Stage name	Song	Identity	Result
1	Wolf	"There's Nothing Holdin' Me Back" by Shawn Mendes	undisclosed	SAFE
2	Lion	"Bad Guy" by Billie Eilish	undisclosed	SAFE
3	Alien	"Youngblood" by 5 Seconds of Summer	Nikki Webster	OUT
4	Prawn	"I Want to Break Free" by Queen	undisclosed	SAFE
5	Robot	"The Horses" by Daryl Braithwaite	undisclosed	SAFE

=== Episode 4 (1 October) ===
Performances on the fourth episode
#	Stage name	Song	Identity	Result
1	Spider	"It's a Long Way to the Top (If You Wanna Rock 'n' Roll)" by AC/DC	undisclosed	SAFE
2	Monster	"I Want to Know What Love Is" by Foreigner	undisclosed	SAFE
3	Rhino	"Low" by Flo Rida	Wendell Sailor	OUT
4	Unicorn	"Proud Mary" by Tina Turner	undisclosed	SAFE
5	Dragon	"Roar" by Katy Perry	undisclosed	SAFE

=== Episode 5 (7 October) ===
- Group number: "Me!" by Taylor Swift

Performances on the fifth episode
#	Stage name	Song	Identity	Result
1	Prawn	"Let Me Entertain You" by Robbie Williams	Darren McMullen	OUT
2	Robot	"I Don't Care" by Ed Sheeran & Justin Bieber	undisclosed	SAFE
3	Lion	"Heroes" by David Bowie	undisclosed	SAFE
4	Wolf	"Disco Inferno" by The Trammps	undisclosed	SAFE

=== Episode 6 (8 October) ===
- Group number: "So Am I" by Ava Max

Performances on the sixth episode
#	Stage name	Song	Identity	Result
1	Spider	"Zombie" by The Cranberries	undisclosed	SAFE
2	Dragon	"Shut Up and Dance" by Walk the Moon	Adam Brand	OUT
3	Monster	"Beautiful" by Christina Aguilera	undisclosed	SAFE
4	Unicorn	"Crazy in Love" by Beyoncé feat. Jay-Z	undisclosed	SAFE

=== Episode 7 (14 October) ===
Performances on the seventh episode
#	Stage name	Song	Identity	Result
1	Lion	"Moves like Jagger" by Maroon 5 & Christina Aguilera	Kate Ceberano	OUT
2	Monster	"All by Myself" by Celine Dion	undisclosed	SAFE
3	Spider	"Titanium" by David Guetta & Sia	undisclosed	SAFE
4	Wolf	"Shallow" by Lady Gaga & Bradley Cooper	undisclosed	SAFE
5	Robot	"Can't Get You Out of My Head" by Kylie Minogue	undisclosed	SAFE
6	Unicorn	"Forget You" by CeeLo Green	undisclosed	SAFE

=== Episode 8 (15 October) ===
Performances on the eighth episode
#	Stage name	Song	Identity	Result
1	Unicorn	"Locked Out of Heaven" by Bruno Mars	Deni Hines	OUT
2	Spider	"Someone You Loved" by Lewis Capaldi	Paulini	OUT
3	Robot	"Jolene" by Dolly Parton / "Nothing Breaks Like A Heart" by Mark Ronson & Miley Cyrus	undisclosed	SAFE
4	Monster	"Listen to Your Heart" by Roxette	undisclosed	SAFE
5	Wolf	"Everybody (Backstreet's Back)" by Backstreet Boys	undisclosed	SAFE

=== Episode 10 (21 October) — Finale ===
- Group number: "This is Me" by Keala Settle, Benj Pasek & Justin Paul

Performances on the tenth episode
#	Stage name	Song	Identity	Result
1	Wolf	"Come Together" by The Beatles	Rob Mills	RUNNER-UP
2	Monster	"What About Us" by Pink	Gorgi Coghlan	THIRD
3	Robot	"The Edge of Glory" by Lady Gaga	Cody Simpson	WINNER

== Controversy ==
Independent music group Halocene purported that the Lion's (Kate Ceberano) rendition of "Bad Guy" in episode 3 was "virtually identical" to their own original cover and arrangement of the song. Ceberano received backlash on social media, after which it was clarified that she did not choose the arrangement, only the song.

== Reception ==
=== Ratings ===
No.	Title	Air date	Timeslot	Overnight ratings		Consolidated ratings		Total viewers	Ref(s)
No.	Title	Air date	Timeslot	Viewers	Rank	Viewers	Rank	Total viewers	Ref(s)
1	Episode 1	23 September 2019	Monday 7:30 pm	1,162,000	1	95,000	1	1,257,000	
2	Episode 2	24 September 2019	Tuesday 7:30 pm	1,054,000	1	95,000	1	1,149,000	
3	Episode 3 Mask Reveal	30 September 2019	Monday 7:30 pm Monday 8:30 pm	835,000 1,063,000	6 1	75,000 74,000	4 1	910,000 1,144,000	
4	Episode 4 Mask Reveal	1 October 2019	Tuesday 7:30 pm	848,000 1,004,000	5 1	125,000 104,000	2 1	977,000 1,127,000	
5	Episode 5 Mask Reveal	7 October 2019	Monday 7:30 pm	700,000 880,000	9 5	72,000 66,000	8 2	781,000 995,000	
6	Episode 6 Mask Reveal	8 October 2019	Tuesday 7:30 pm	713,000 877,000	7 4	78,000 79,000	6 3	791,000 956,000	
7	Episode 7 Mask Reveal	14 October 2019	Monday 7:30 pm	905,000 1,155,000	6 1	43,000 49,000	6 1	948,000 1,204,000	
8	Semi Finals: Double Unmasking Mask Reveals	15 October 2019	Tuesday 7:30 pm	839,000 1,007,000	5 1	72,00 87,000	3 1	911,000 1,094,000	
9	The Masked Singer: Unmasked "Road to Grand Finale"	15 October 2019	Tuesday 8:40 pm	617,000	9	64,000	9	683,000	
10	Grand Finale The Final Reveal	21 October 2019	Monday 7:30 pm	1,050,000 1,372,000	2 1	45,000 52,000	2 1	1,095,000 1,425,000	

== See also ==
- List of Australian television series
- The Masked Singer franchise
- It Takes Two
