= Receive the Power =

Single by Guy Sebastian and Paulini
- Released: 1 July 2007
- Recorded: 2007
- Genre: Christian, gospel
- Length: 5:10
- Label: Sony BMG
- Songwriters: Guy Sebastian, Gary Pinto

Guy Sebastian singles chronology
"Cover on My Heart" (2007)	"Receive the Power" (2007)	"Like It Like That" (2009)

Paulini singles chronology
"I Believe" (2006)	"Receive the Power" (2007)	"Scarless" (2009)

"Receive the Power" is a gospel song written by Guy Sebastian and Gary Pinto, and performed by Sebastian and Paulini. It was chosen in May 2007 as the official anthem for the Roman Catholic Church's XXIII World Youth Day (WYD08) held in Sydney in 2008.

"Receive the Power" was used extensively throughout the six days of World Youth Day in July 2008, and also in the television coverage which went around the world. Sebastian performed at the concert after the Opening Mass which officially welcomed the Pope to Australia. The Mass and concert at Barangaroo, Sydney, had an estimated crowd of 150,000. Sebastian and Paulini also performed both the English and International versions at the Final Mass at Randwick Racecourse on 20 July. An estimated 400,000 people attended the Mass. Sebastian and Paulini were invited to perform "Receive the Power" at the Pope's Farewell and thank the volunteers on 21 July.

== Versions ==
The song has been released in two versions, one in English and an international version with the chorus in English and verses in Italian, Spanish and French.

The English version was interpreted by its composer, Guy Sebastian, and also features the vocals of Paulini.

The international version, with the chorus in English, also includes performances by Robert Galea (Maltese), German Silva (Spanish) and Amelia Farrugia (French).

== About the lyrics ==
The lyrics are based on the theme of the WYD08, extracted from the book of the Acts of the Apostles, 1:8: "You will receive power when the Holy Spirit has come upon you; and you will be my witnesses".

== Track listing ==
Digital download
No.	Title	Length
1.	"Receive the Power"	5:10
2.	"Receive the Power" (international version)	5:10
