= Bankstown Girls High School =

Location
- Mona Street; Bankstown, New South Wales, 2200; Australia; 33°55′15″S 151°1′55″E

Information
- Type: Government-funded single-sex comprehensive secondary day school
- Motto: Latin: Semper Optime (Always the best)
- Established: 1959; 67 years ago
- School district: Bankstown
- Educational authority: New South Wales Education Standards Authority
- Oversight: New South Wales Department of Education
- Principal: Suada Bilali
- Staff: 44 (2023)
- Years: 7–12
- Gender: Girls
- Enrolment: 503 (2023)
- Campus type: Suburban
- Colours: Navy blue and white
- Website: bankstowng-h.schools.nsw.gov.au

Bankstown Girls High School is a government-funded single-sex comprehensive secondary day school for girls, located in Bankstown, a south-western suburb of Sydney, New South Wales, Australia.

Established in 1959, the school enrolled approximately 503 students in 2023 from Year 7 to Year 12, of whom less than one percent identified as Indigenous Australians and 98 percent were from a language background other than English.

== Notable alumnae ==
- Paulini Curuenavuli – R&B singer and former Australian Idol contestant and Young Divas member
- Mary Fowler – Australian soccer player

== See also ==
- List of government schools in New South Wales
- Education in Australia
