= Amazing Grace: Songs for Christmas =

EP by Paulini
- Released: 26 November 2004
- Recorded: 2004
- Genres: Pop, R&B, soul
- Length: 29:16
- Label: Sony BMG Australia
- Producer: Audius Mtawarira

Paulini chronology
One Determined Heart (2004)	Amazing Grace: Songs for Christmas (2004)	Superwoman (2006)

Amazing Grace: Songs for Christmas is the first extended play (EP) by Australian recording artist Paulini, released on 26 November 2004 by Sony BMG Australia. The EP was produced by Audius Mtawarira and features cover versions of popular Christmas songs, as well as guest vocal appearances by Darlene Zschech and Human Nature. Amazing Grace: Songs for Christmas peaked at number 70 on the ARIA Albums Chart, and at number seven on the ARIA Urban Albums Chart.

== Track listing ==
No.	Title	Writer(s)	Length
1.	"Amazing Grace" (featuring Darlene Zschech)	John Newton	3:27
2.	"Have Yourself a Merry Little Christmas"	Hugh Martin, Ralph Blane	4:14
3.	"Grown-Up Christmas List"	David Foster, Linda Thompson-Jenner	4:08
4.	"When a Child Is Born"	Zacar, Fred Jay	3:28
5.	"O Come, All Ye Faithful"	John Francis Wade, Frederick Oakeley	3:17
6.	"Silent Night"	Franz Xaver Gruber, Joseph Mohr	3:28
7.	"Never Too Much"	Luther Vandross	4:02
8.	"People Get Ready" (featuring Human Nature)	Curtis Mayfield	3:08

== Charts ==
On 6 December 2004, the EP debuted at number 82 on the ARIA Albums Chart, and at number eight on the ARIA Urban Albums Chart. The following week, Amazing Grace: Songs for Christmas peaked at number 70 on the ARIA Albums Chart, and at number seven on the ARIA Urban Albums Chart.

Chart (2004)	Peak position
ARIA Albums Chart	70
ARIA Urban Albums Chart	7

== Release history ==
Country	Date	Format	Label
Australia	26 November 2004	CD, digital download	Sony BMG Australia
