= Scarless =

Single by Paulini
- Released: 13 November 2009
- Genre: Pop
- Length: 4:05
- Songwriters: Paulini Curuenavuli, Thanh Bui, Alfred Tuohey

Paulini singles chronology
| "Receive the Power" (2007) | "Scarless" (2009) | "Believe Again" (2010) |

Music video
- Paulini – Scarless on YouTube

"Scarless" is a song by Australian recording artist Paulini. It was written by Paulini, Thanh Bui and Alfred Tuohey. The song marked the first time Paulini released music independently. Lyrically, "Scarless" is about a long-term abusive relationship Paulini had in 2006 with Australian rugby league footballer Wes Naiqama. The song was released digitally on 13 November 2009, to help raise awareness and support for White Ribbon Day, an international day to prevent violence against women. Upon its release, "Scarless" debuted at number 18 on the AIR Independent Radio Chart. An accompanying music video was directed by Ross Wood.

== Background and release ==
"Scarless" was written by Paulini, Thanh Bui and Alfred Tuohey. Lyrically, the song is about a long-term abusive relationship Paulini had in 2006 with Australian rugby league footballer Wes Naiqama. She wrote "Scarless" to help other victims of domestic violence. In an interview with The Daily Telegraph, Paulini said "I've never spoken about it because really, when it first happened, I've got to say I just wanted to go into a hotel room and hide away. It was difficult for me to talk about because not only was I going through it, my family and friends were, too. I wasn't strong enough then like I am now. If you read the lyrics, you will know exactly what the song is about and how hard it was for me."

"Scarless" was released digitally on 13 November 2009 to help raise awareness and support for White Ribbon Day, an international day to prevent violence against women. "Scarless" marked the first time Paulini released music independently. On being an independent artist, Paulini told Auspop: "For the first time I feel like I'm in control of my music...with the independent thing, you know exactly what you're paying to who and you're in control from your music to what is written, to what you release out there – you're across it all, which is a great thing."

== Music video ==
The accompanying music video for "Scarless" was directed by Ross Wood. The video displays scenes of Paulini reminiscing about the time her boyfriend trashed her hotel room.

== Track listing ==
- Digital download
1. "Scarless" – 4:05

== Charts ==
| Chart (2009) | Peak position |
|---|---|
| AIR Independent Radio Chart | 18 |

== Release history ==
| Country | Date | Format |
|---|---|---|
| Australia | 13 November 2009 | Digital download |
