= So Over You =

Single by Paulini

from the album Superwoman
- Released: 13 May 2006
- Recorded: Mothership Studios (London)
- Genre: Pop, R&B
- Length: 2:53 (Single version); 3:13 (Album version)
- Label: Sony BMG
- Songwriter(s): Nigel Butler, Paulini Curuenavuli, Ray Hedges, Andy Love, Jarrad Rogers
- Producer(s): Ray Hedges

Paulini singles chronology
"Rough Day" (2006)	"So Over You" (2006)	"I Believe" (2006)

"So Over You" is a song by Australian recording artist Paulini, taken from her second studio album, Superwoman (2006). It was written by Nigel Butler, Paulini, Ray Hedges, Andy Love and Jarrad Rogers, while the production was handled by Hedges. "So Over You" was released as a CD single and Digital EP on 13 May 2006, as the second single from the album. The song peaked at number 49 on the ARIA Singles Chart. The accompanying music video was directed by Jonathan and Josh Baker, and features scenes of Paulini at an outdoor basketball court.

== Track listing ==
- CD single / Digital EP
1. "So Over You" (Cutfather & Joe Remix Edit) – 2:53
2. "So Over You" (Breathe Remix) – 2:49
3. "So Over You" (Mrtimothy's Radio Remix) – 3:08
4. "Shake It Up" featuring Nate Wadé – 3:17

== Charts ==
"So Over You" debuted on the ARIA Singles Chart at number 50 on 22 May 2006. The following week, the song peaked at number 49.

Chart (2006)	Peak position
ARIA Singles Chart	49
