= Angel Eyes (The Jeff Healey Band song) =

1989 single by the Jeff Healey Band

Single by the Jeff Healey Band

from the album See the Light
- B-side: "Don't Let Your Chance Go By"
- Released: April 17, 1989
- Length: 5:19 (LP version); 4:40 (single version)
- Label: Arista
- Songwriters: John Hiatt; Fred Koller
- Producer: Greg Ladanyi

The Jeff Healey Band singles chronology
| "Confidence Man" (1989) | "Angel Eyes" (1989) | "See the Light" (1989) |

"Angel Eyes" is a song written by John Hiatt and Fred Koller and produced by Greg Ladanyi for the Jeff Healey Band's first album, See the Light (1988). It was first released in the United Kingdom as the album's second single in April 1989 and was issued in the United States several weeks later. The song peaked at No. 5 on the US Billboard Hot 100 and No. 24 on Billboard's Album Rock Tracks chart. In 2004, "Angel Eyes" was covered by Australian Idol series one contestant Paulini and became her first No. 1 single in Australia.

== Chart performance ==
"Angel Eyes" debuted on the US Billboard Hot 100 on June 17, 1989, at No. 85, eventually peaking at No. 5 and spending 22 weeks on the chart. In Canada, the stayed on the RPM 100 Singles chart for 28 weeks, peaking at No. 16. It was the 70th-highest-selling single in the United States for 1989. Hiatt's own version of the song finally appeared on his 1994 live album Hiatt Comes Alive at Budokan?. A studio version of the song was included on the 1998 album The Best of John Hiatt.

== Critical reception ==
Upon its release, "Angel Eyes" received a highly negative review from the British music magazine Melody Maker. The publication strongly criticized the song and the band's musical approach, dismissing the general consensus that viewed frontman Jeff Healey as an "inspired genius" based merely on his "absolute mastery of an instrument."

The reviewer attacked the track's traditionalist roots, arguing that the heavy influence of "blues and country folklore" reduced pop music to a predictable, conservative "utopia of rightful succession." The magazine further condemned the song's adherence to rigid technical standards, claiming that it completely obliterated artistic elements like "beauty, madness, surprise and sickness" because they were treated as "illogical" qualities. Concluding the review, Melody Maker unfavorably aligned Healey with established blues-rock guitarists Eric Clapton and Robert Cray, aggressively labeling Healey as a "criminal" against musical innovation and declaring that in his musical world, contemporary alternative acts like Bros, The Darling Buds, and The Young Gods were unjustly treated as "equally contemptible." In a scathing review for New Musical Express, the track was heavily criticized for its lack of energy. The reviewer described the melody as "leaden" and humorously claimed it was dull enough to put even the most hyperactive listener to sleep, concluding that it prompted the magazine's entire staff to immediately doze off.

== Track listing ==
Vinyl single

1. "Angel Eyes" — 4:32
2. "Don't Let Your Chance Go By" — 3:20

== Charts ==
=== Weekly charts ===
| Chart (1989) | Peak position |
|---|---|
| Australia (ARIA) | 115 |
| Canada Top Singles (RPM) | 16 |
| UK Singles (Official Charts) | 86 |
| US Billboard Hot 100 | 5 |
| US Adult Contemporary (Billboard) | 7 |
| US Album Rock Tracks (Billboard) | 24 |
| US Cash Box Top 100 | 6 |

=== Year-end charts ===
| Chart (1989) | Rank |
|---|---|
| Canada Top Singles (RPM) | 72 |
| US Billboard Hot 100 | 70 |

== Paulini version ==
"Angel Eyes"

Single by Paulini

from the album One Determined Heart
- Released: July 5, 2004
- Length: 4:01
- Label: Sony BMG
- Songwriters: John Hiatt; Fred Koller
- Producer: Audius Mtawarira

Paulini singles chronology
| "Angel Eyes" (2004) | "We Can Try" (2004) |

"Angel Eyes" was covered by Australian recording artist Paulini for her debut studio album, One Determined Heart (2004). It was produced by Audius Mtawarira and released physically on July 5, 2004, as the lead single from the album. In a statement posted to her official website, Paulini said "'Angel Eyes' is an amazing song. Audius came up with some great ideas and we did it and it worked. All the instruments are live. It's turned out to be one of the best song[s]." "Angel Eyes" peaked at No. 1 on the ARIA Singles Chart for three consecutive weeks and was certified platinum by the Australian Recording Industry Association (ARIA), for shipments of 70,000 copies. The song earned Paulini an ARIA No. 1 Chart Award and a nomination for "Highest Selling Single" at the 2004 ARIA Music Awards.

=== Chart performance ===
"Angel Eyes" debuted at No. 2 on the ARIA Singles Chart on July 12, 2004. The following week, the song rose to No. 1, where it remained for three consecutive weeks. "Angel Eyes" was certified platinum by the ARIA, for shipments of 70,000 copies. On the New Zealand Singles Chart, the song debuted and peaked at No. 34 on October 11, 2004.

=== Music video ===
The accompanying music video for "Angel Eyes" was filmed on June 15, 2004, in Sydney. On June 1, 2004, Sony BMG announced that they were looking for fans to appear in the video. The video begins with Paulini walking down a footpath and then onto a stage. It shows Paulini walking around behind the stage before proceeding out and singing to an audience of clapping fans.

=== Track listing ===
- CD single
1. "Angel Eyes" – 4:01
2. "Angel Eyes" (Buchman Bounce) – 4:02
3. "Angel Eyes" (Rick Will album mix) – 4:48

=== Charts ===
==== Weekly charts ====
| Chart (2004) | Peak position |
|---|---|
| Australia (ARIA) | 1 |
| New Zealand (Recorded Music NZ) | 34 |

==== Year-end charts ====
| Chart (2004) | Rank |
|---|---|
| Australia (ARIA) | 17 |
| Australian Artists (ARIA) | 4 |

=== Certification ===
| Region | Certification | Certified units/sales |
|---|---|---|
| Australia (ARIA) | Platinum | 70,000^{^} |
^{^} Shipments figures based on certification alone.

== New Grass Revival version ==
The progressive bluegrass band New Grass Revival recorded a cover which can be found on their last album release, Friday Night in America from 1989. It's been featured as well on the bands compilation albums, 1990's New Grass Anthology, 1994's The Best of New Grass Revival, and 2005's Grass Roots: The Best of New Grass Revival.

== See also ==
- List of one-hit wonders in the United States
