= Superwoman (Paulini album) =

Studio album by Paulini
- Released: 5 August 2006
- Recorded: 2005; Sydney, Australia; Los Angeles, California; Barcelona, Spain; London, United Kingdom
- Genre: Pop, R&B, soul
- Length: 46:13
- Label: Sony BMG

Paulini chronology
Amazing Grace: Songs for Christmas (2004)	Superwoman (2006)	Come Alive (2015)

Singles from Superwoman
- 1. "Rough Day" Released: 22 January 2006; 2. "So Over You" Released: 13 May 2006; 3. "I Believe" Released: August 2006 (radio)

Superwoman is the second studio album by Australian recording artist Paulini, released through Sony BMG Australia on 5 August 2006. It is the follow-up to her 2004 debut album, One Determined Heart. Paulini recorded Superwoman in Sydney, London, Los Angeles and Barcelona, and worked with several songwriters and producers, including Matthew Gerrard, Fingaz, Ray Hedges, Colin Emmanuel, Steve Kipner and Jarrad Rogers, among others. The album failed to achieve the commercial success of its predecessor, debuting at number 72 on the ARIA Albums Chart. Its first two singles, "Rough Day" and "So Over You" both performed moderately on the ARIA Singles Chart.

== Background and development ==
Superwoman was recorded in Sydney, London, Los Angeles and Barcelona. On 28 April 2005, Sony BMG Australia announced via their official website that Paulini had finished recording her second studio album and that it would include original material, unlike her debut album One Determined Heart (2004), which was predominantly covers of classic pop songs. On 3 June 2005, Sony BMG announced that Paulini was in the process of finalising the album's track listing and that its lead single would be released to radio stations in August 2005. Paulini posted a preview of three of the album's songs, "Rough Day", "So Over You" and "I Believe", via her official website on 10 August 2005. It was later confirmed that "Rough Day" would be released as the lead single in October 2005, followed by the album's release in February 2006. However, in November 2005, Sony BMG announced that the single was pushed back for a January 2006 release.

On 12 January 2006, Sony BMG announced that Superwoman received another pushback to 12 March 2006. During this time, rumours began to circulate that Paulini was being dropped from the label. However, the album was finally released on 5 August 2006. In a statement posted to her official website, Paulini said:

I absolutely treasure this album. I've had more control, some of my own songs are on it, and I've sung it exactly the way I wanted to sing it. I hope that people will be happy with it. I've tried my best. But for me, the most important thing is that people know that I can sing and I'm not faking everything. It's real and it's genuine.

== Singles ==
"Rough Day" was sent to Australian radio stations on 5 December 2005, and released as a CD single on 22 January 2006. The song debuted and peaked on the ARIA Singles Chart at number 26. "Rough Day" had a better impact on the ARIA Dance Chart, where it peaked at number three. "So Over You" was released physically and digitally on 13 May 2006, as the second single from the album. The song peaked at number 49 on the ARIA Singles Chart. The third single "I Believe" had a limited radio release in August 2006. An accompanying music video for the song was still released.

== Reception ==
Superwoman earned Paulini two nominations at the 2007 Australia and New Zealand Urban Music Awards for Best Female Artist and Best R&B Album. The album debuted on the ARIA Albums Chart at number 72 on 14 August 2006. Superwoman performed better on the ARIA Urban Albums Chart, where it debuted at number nine.

== Track listing ==
No.	Title	Writer(s)	Length
1.	"Call Me"	Colin Emmanuel, Celetia Martin, Alan Simpson	3:02
2.	"So Over You"	Nigel Butler, Paulini, Ray Hedges, Andy Love, Jarrad Rogers	3:13
3.	"Rough Day"	Bridget Benenate, Matthew Gerrard, Franne Golde	3:28
4.	"Married Man"	Benenate, Gerard	3:31
5.	"I Believe"	Kerima Holm, Vinny Vero, Peter Ledin, Peter Modén, Carl Sahlin	3:14
6.	"The Poet"	David Frank, Steve Kipner, Pamela Sheyne	3:28
7.	"Shake It Up" (featuring Nate Wadé)	Tim Baxter, Paulini, Klaus Derendorf, Tom Nichols	3:18
8.	"Last Love"	Paulini, Love, Rogers	3:05
9.	"Superwoman" (Karyn White cover)	Kenneth "Babyface" Edmonds, Antonio LA Reid, Daryl Simmons	5:18
10.	"Cravin'"	Butler, Hedges, Dion Howell, Michael Mugisha, Cherise Roberts, Nadia Shepherd	3:13
11.	"Who Will I Run To?"	Mishke Butler, Harvey Mason, Jr., Damon Thomas	4:18
12.	"I Choose You"	Steve Duberry, Rod Gammons	4:02
13.	"Superwoman" (12" Club Mix)	Edmonds, Reid, Simmons	6:01

== Charts ==
Chart (2006)	Peak position
ARIA Albums Chart	72
ARIA Urban Albums Chart	9

== Release history ==
Country	Date	Format	Label
Australia	5 August 2006	CD, digital download	Sony BMG Australia
