= One Determined Heart =

Studio album by Paulini
- Released: 23 July 2004
- Recorded: 2004
- Genre: Pop, R&B, soul
- Length: 51:04
- Label: Sony BMG
- Producer: Audius Mtawarira

Paulini chronology
One Determined Heart (2004)	Amazing Grace: Songs for Christmas (2004)

Singles from One Determined Heart
- 1. "Angel Eyes" Released: 5 July 2004; 2. "We Can Try" Released: 4 October 2004

One Determined Heart is the debut studio album by Australian recording artist Paulini, released through Sony BMG Australia on 23 July 2004. The album produced by Audius Mtawarira and recorded by Louise Wheatley, mostly features cover songs by Jeff Healey, The Tymes, TLC, Brownstone, Four Tops, Barbra Streisand, Jeff Buckley, Bonnie Raitt, Phil Collins and Whitney Houston. One Determined Heart debuted at number one on the ARIA Albums Chart and was certified platinum by the Australian Recording Industry Association (ARIA), for shipments of 70,000 copies. The album was preceded by the lead single "Angel Eyes", which peaked at number one on the ARIA Singles Chart and was also certified platinum. Paulini earned ARIA No. 1 Chart Awards for both "Angel Eyes" and One Determined Heart. The second single "We Can Try" was released in October 2004 and peaked at number 30 on the ARIA Singles Chart.

== Singles ==
A cover of Jeff Healey's "Angel Eyes" was released physically on 5 July 2004, as the lead single from One Determined Heart. The song peaked at number one on the ARIA Singles Chart for three consecutive weeks and was certified platinum by the Australian Recording Industry Association (ARIA), for shipments of 70,000 copies. It earned Paulini an ARIA No. 1 Chart Award and a nomination for "Highest Selling Single" at the 2004 ARIA Music Awards.

One of the album's original songs, "We Can Try", was released physically on 4 October 2004, as the second single from the album. The song peaked at number 30 on the ARIA Singles Chart.

== Chart performance ==
One Determined Heart debuted on the ARIA Albums Chart at number one on 2 August 2004, where it remained for two consecutive weeks. The album was certified platinum by the ARIA.

== Track listing ==
No.	Title	Writer(s)	Length
1.	"Angel Eyes" (Jeff Healey cover)	John Hiatt, Fred Koller	4:01
2.	"If You Love Me" (Brownstone cover)	Gordon Chambers, Nichole Gilbert, Dave Hall	3:54
3.	"You Little Trustmaker" (The Tymes cover)	Christopher Mark Johnson	3:25
4.	"Baby I Need Your Lovin'" (Four Tops cover)	Lamont Dozier, Brian Holland, Eddie Holland	4:28
5.	"No More Tears (Enough Is Enough)" (Barbra Streisand and Donna Summer cover)	Paul Jabara, Bruce Roberts	5:31
6.	"Everybody Here Wants You" (Jeff Buckley cover)	Jeff Buckley	4:30
7.	"We Can Try"	Audius Mtawarira, Jeneya Carr	3:59
8.	"I Can't Make You Love Me" (Bonnie Raitt cover)	Mike Reid, James Shamblin	4:25
9.	"One More Night" (Phil Collins cover)	Phil Collins	3:36
10.	"Where You Are" (Whitney Houston cover)	LeMel Humes, James Calabrese, Dyan Humes	4:28
11.	"Waterfalls" (TLC cover)	Marqueze Etheridge, Lisa "Left Eye" Lopes, Organized Noize	4:56
12.	"One Determined Heart"	Leslie Mills, Chris Pelcer	3:39

== Charts and certifications ==
=== Weekly charts ===
Chart (2004)	Peak position
ARIA Albums Chart	1

=== Year-end charts ===
Chart (2004)	Rank
ARIA Albums Chart	86
ARIA Urban Albums Chart	11

=== Certifications ===
Country	Certification
Australia (ARIA)	Platinum

== Release history ==
Country	Date	Format	Label
Australia	23 July 2004	CD, digital download	Sony BMG Australia
