= Audius Mtawarira =

- Birth name: Audius Tonderai Mtawarira
- Also known as: Audius
- Born: 1977 (age 47–48); Chimbumu, Guruve, Zimbabwe
- Origin: Perth, Western Australia
- Genres: Urban Grooves
- Occupation(s): Singer-songwriter, record producer
- Instrument: Vocals
- Website: www.audiusonline.com

Audius Tonderai Mtawarira (born 1977 in Chimbumu, Guruve, Zimbabwe) is a Zimbabwean singer-songwriter and record producer, who often works mononymously as Audius. From 1996 to 2012, he lived in Australia. At the APRA Music Awards of 2009, he was co-winner of Urban Work of the Year for writing "Running Back" with its singer, Jessica Mauboy, and with American rapper, Sean Ray Mullins (a.k.a. Snob Scrilla).

== Early life ==
Audius Tonderai Mtawarira was born in 1977 in Chimbumu, Guruve District, Zimbabwe, His father, Augustine Mtawarira, who died in 2012, was a farmer and property manager.

Mtawarira attended Ruzawi School, a private Anglican boarding primary school in Marondera, where he was amongst the first Native African students to be enrolled. Audius then attended Peterhouse Boys' School, Marondera, a private boarding secondary school where he sang in the School Choir, played piano and drums. He participated in Cricket, Rugby, and Athletics, representing his school and district in each sport. He completed his secondary education at Gateway High School in Harare, where he performed in the school choir and participated in the music programs. He also represented his school as captain in Rugby, Cricket and Athletics. In 1996, Audius left Zimbabwe to further his studies in Perth, Western Australia at Edith Cowan University. He later moved to Curtin University to complete his Bachelor of Arts Degree in Graphic Design.

== Career ==
Audius turned his attention to writing and producing music. He started producing in 2002, producing the majority of Selwyn's album, Meant to Be which peaked at number nine on the ARIA Album charts and was certified Gold. In 2003 he collaborated with Delta Goodrem on Innocent Eyes co-writing and producing the number one single "Born to Try". The song debuted at number three before reaching number one on the Australian Singles chart, becoming Goodrem's first number one single. It spent three months in the top five and went on to sell over 210,000 copies, making it the third highest selling single of 2002. In the UK, it debuted and peaked the charts at number three, spending eleven weeks in the top forty and reached number one on the New Zealand singles charts. "Born to Try" won 'Single of the Year' at the ARIA Music Awards of 2003.

In 2004, Audius produced Australian Idol contestant Paulini's debut album One Determined Heart which produced number a # 1 hit "Angel Eyes" and went certified Platinum. In 2005, he co-wrote fellow-Idol Contestant Ricki-Lee Coulter's "Hell No!", which reached number five on the ARIA singles charts, and produced majority of her album.

In 2008, Audius produced Jessica Mauboy's new album, Been Waiting, co-writing her single, "Running Back", which peaked at number three on the Australian singles charts. 2008 also saw Audius launch his own fashion label, Shona Clothing, which is heavily influenced by his Zimbabwean heritage. "Running Back" won 'Highest Selling Single' at the ARIA Music Awards of 2009.

== Discography ==
=== Solo artist ===
- Audius (2002)
- Ever After (2003)
- Music and Me (2005)
- Day Like This - Blindfaith/Inertia (2008)
- House of Stones - Blindfaith (2014)
- PREDESTINATION - Blindfaith (2016)
- 2020 - Blindfaith (2020)

=== Production discography ===
- Meant to Be (Selwyn)
- Destiny (Levi)
- One Determined Heart (Paulini)
- Rikki-Lee (Ricki-Lee Coulter)
- Are You Ready (Shakaya)
- Wines and Spirits (Rahsaan Patterson)
- From the Mind of a Dreamer (Sarah Reeves)
- Through My Eyes (Erica Baxter)
- Close to You (Vincy)
- Grace Bawden (Grace Bawden)
- Been Waiting (Jessica Mauboy)
- The Day Before (Snob Scrilla)
- Bebaskan (Shila)
- "Inside Out" (Stan Walker)
- "With Me" (Stan Walker)
- "Chandelier" (Stan Walker)
- "Stand Up" (Stan Walker)
- "Kissing You" (Stan Walker)
- "Like This" featuring Iyaz (Jessica Mauboy)
- "Goddess" (Movie Musical)
- "Catch Me" (Sha-Sha)
- "Naked" (Aaron Beri)
- "To Myself" (Alfie Arcuri)
- "Messin' (With My Head)" (Charlotte Jade) (2024)
- "BACK TO YOU" (Charlotte Jade)(2025)
- "FIX ME" (Charlotte Jade) (2025)
- "MINE" (Charlotte Jade) (2025)

=== Songwriting discography ===
- "Buggin' Me", "Way Loves Supposed To Be" & "Like This, Like That" (Selwyn)
- "Born to Try" (Delta Goodrem) (2002)
- "Til I Found You" (Casey Donovan)
- "Goodbye" (Levi)
- "We Can Try" (Paulini)
- "Hell No!", "Something About You Babe", "Stay With Me"& "Done With It" (Ricki-Lee Coulter) (2005) Of Ricki-Lee (album)
- "War" (Laurent Wolf)
- "Too Late" & "Tyna Find the One" (Shakaya)
- "Take Me to a Place" (Ricki Lee Coulter) of
- "Stop Breaking My Heart" (Rahsaan Patterson)
- "Little Girl" & "Here We Go Again" (Sarah Reeves)
- "Hey", "Just Another Day", "Ever Be The Same", "Frustrated" & "Country Girl" (Erica Baxter)
- "I Believe" (Vincy)
- "Go Crazy" (Liena)
- "Should Have Loved You More" (Jade McCrae)
- "Running Back", "Magical", "To The Floor" (Jessica Mauboy) (2008) of Been Waiting
- "There You Go Again", "Mr Officer", "Chasing Ghosts", "D.I.S." & "Mr Whatever" (Snob Scrilla)
- "Hell No" & "Lets Pretend" (Shila)
- "I'm Not A Puppet" (Debra)
- "Inside Out (Stan Walker)
- "With Me" (Stan Walker)
- "Like This" (Jessica Mauboy) (2010) of Get Em Girls
- "Catch Me" (Sha-Sha)
- "The Other Side" (Anise K)
- "Naked' (Aaron Beri) 2019
- "To Myself" (Alfie Arcuri) 2020
- "Play" (Delta Goodrem) 2021 of Bridge Over Troubled Dreams
- "Pray" (Dami Im) 2021 of My Reality
- "Tell Em" (Jessica Mauboy) of Yours Forever (Jessica Mauboy album) (2024)
- "Messin' (With My Head)" (Charlotte Jade) (2024)
- "FIX ME" (Charlotte Jade) (2025)
- "MINE" (Charlotte Jade) (2025)
