= Greatest Hits (Sybil album) =

Compilation album by Sybil
- Released: 1997
- Genre: Dance-pop; Eurodance; pop; R&B
- Label: Next Plateau Entertainment

Sybil chronology
Good 'N' Ready (1993)	Greatest Hits (1997)	Still a Thrill (1997)

Professional ratings
Review scores
Source	Rating
AllMusic	4/5 stars
Music Week	4/5 stars

Greatest Hits is the first compilation album by American R&B and pop singer-songwriter Sybil, released in 1997.

== Critical reception ==
British magazine Music Week rated the compilation four out of five, writing, "The New Jersey soul singer's superb voice – and ability to tackle a variety of material – is showcased on this fine 19-track collection, which includes her 12 hits from the past decade."

== Track listing ==
=== Greatest Hits (US edition) ===
1. "Don't Make Me Over" (Tony King Remix) – 3:54
2. "Walk On By" (Tony King Remix) – 4:04
3. "Love's Calling" – 3:40
4. "You're the Love of My Life" (Desmond 'Divine' Houston Remix) – 4:50
5. "Falling in Love" – 5:00
6. "Let Yourself Go" – 5:29
7. "My Love Is Guaranteed" (Prophets Of Rage Remix) – 3:53
8. "Oh, How I Love You" (Victor Simonelli Remix) – 3:53
9. "The Love I Lost" (AKA Remix) – 3:24
10. "When I'm Good and Ready" (Stratoradio Remix) – 3:50
11. "Open Up the Door" (Eddie O'Loughlin Remix) – 5:04
12. "Crazy for You" (featuring Salt-N-Pepa) – 4:27
13. "Let It Rain" (D'Anthony's Moody Vibe Remix) – 5:57

=== Greatest Hits (Europe edition) ===
1. "When I'm Good and Ready" (Original) – 3:34
2. "The Love I Lost" – 3:25
3. "Don't Make Me Over" – 4:03
4. "Walk On By" – 4:08
5. "Make It Easy on Me" – 4:03
6. "Beyond Your Wildest Dreams" (Johnny's Jumpin' Vibe Remix) – 3:11
7. "Falling in Love" – 4:23
8. "Let Yourself Go" – 5:43
9. "My Love Is Guaranteed" (Remix) – 3:58
10. "Oh, How I Love You" (Remix) – 3:55
11. "You're the Love of My Life" (Remix) – 4:53
12. "Love's Calling" – 3:45
13. "Open Up the Door" – 5:09
14. "Crazy for You" (featuring Salt-N-Pepa) – 4:29
15. "Let It Rain" (D'Anthony's Moody Vibe Remix) – 6:00
16. "Guarantee of Love" – 4:02
17. "Stronger Together" – 3:30
18. "Didn't See the Signs" – 3:07
19. "When I'm Good and Ready" (Stratoradio Remix) – 3:50

== Sources ==
- Discogs
