= Young Divas discography =

- Studio albums: 2
- Compilation albums: 1
- Singles: 4
- Music videos: 4
- Album appearances: 2

The discography of Young Divas, an Australian pop girl group, consists of two studio albums, one compilation album, four singles, two album appearances and four music videos. The group was formed in 2006 by Sony BMG Australia which included previous Australian Idol contestants Ricki-Lee Coulter, Paulini, Kate DeAraugo and Emily Williams. Young Divas released their self-titled debut album in November 2006, which debuted at number four on the ARIA Albums Chart and was certified double platinum by the Australian Recording Industry Association (ARIA), for shipments of 140,000 copies. A cover of Donna Summer's "This Time I Know It's for Real" was released as the album's lead single and peaked at number two on the ARIA Singles Chart. The song was certified platinum by the ARIA, for shipments of 70,000 copies. The second single was a cover of Lonnie Gordon's "Happenin' All Over Again", which peaked at number nine and was certified gold for shipments of 35,000 copies. A cover of Hazell Dean's "Searchin'" was released as the third and final single from the album, and peaked at number 40.

In June 2007, Coulter left the group to resume her solo music career and was replaced by Jessica Mauboy. Young Divas released their second studio album New Attitude in November 2007, which debuted at number 10 on the ARIA Albums Chart and was certified gold. A cover of Loverboy's "Turn Me Loose" was released as the lead single and featured New Zealand rapper Savage. The song peaked at number 15 on the ARIA Singles Chart. In 2008, the group officially disbanded with all members resuming their solo music careers.

== Albums ==
=== Studio albums ===
List of studio albums, with selected chart positions and certifications
Title	Album details	Peak chart positions	Certifications
Title	Album details	AUS	Certifications
Young Divas	Released: 14 November 2006; Label: Sony BMG Australia; Format: CD, digital download	4	ARIA: 2× Platinum
New Attitude	Released: 24 November 2007; Label: Sony BMG Australia; Format: CD, digital download	10	ARIA: Gold

=== Compilation albums ===
List of compilation albums, with selected details
Title	Album details
New Attitude / Young Divas	Released: 24 April 2009; Label: Sony Music Australia; Format: CD

== Singles ==
List of singles, with selected chart positions
Title	Year	Peak chart positions	Certifications	Album
Title	Year	AUS	Certifications	Album
"This Time I Know It's for Real"	2006	2	ARIA: Platinum	Young Divas
"Happenin' All Over Again"	2006	9	ARIA: Gold	Young Divas
"Searchin'"	2007	40		Young Divas
"Turn Me Loose" (featuring Savage)	2007	15		New Attitude

== Album appearances ==
List of album appearances by Young Divas
Title	Year	Album
"2000 Miles"	2006	Home: Songs of Hope & Journey
"Amazing Grace"	2006	The Spirit of Christmas 2006

== Music videos ==
List of music videos by Young Divas
Title	Year	Director
"This Time I Know It's for Real"	2006	Selina Stang
"Happenin' All Over Again"	2006	Peter Brew-Bevan
"Searchin'"	2007	N/A (Note: The director's name for these music videos have not been found in reliable sources.)
"Turn Me Loose"	2007	N/A
