= No Regret (album) =

Compilation album by Lonnie Gordon

Compilation album by Lonnie Gordon
- Released: October 10, 2000
- Genre: House
- Label: Centaur Entertainment, Inc.

Lonnie Gordon chronology
Bad Mood (1993)	No Regret (2000)

No Regret is a compilation album by singer-songwriter Lonnie Gordon, released on October 10, 2000, through Centaur Entertainment, Inc., with a further release in Japan on June 25, 2003 by label VIVID SOUND. The compilation features the three singles from her debut album If I Have to Stand Alone, the singles and album highlights from her second album Bad Mood, and other tracks Gordon released as singles in the late 1990s which hadn't been included on an album up to that point.

It also includes two new tracks, a cover of Stevie Nicks' single Edge of Seventeen, and a cover of He Lives in You, which was released as a single to promote the album.

== Track listing ==
- 1. "Happenin' All Over Again"
- 2. "Gonna Catch You"
- 3. "No Regrets"
- 4. "If I Have to Stand Alone"
- 5. "Don't Turn Around"
- 6. "Beyond Your Wildest Dreams"
- 7. "Do You Want It?"
- 8. "Bad Mood"
- 9. "Missing You"
- 10. "Dirty Love"
- 11. "If You Really Love Me"
- 12. "A God That Can Dance"
- 13. "Edge of 17"
- 14. "He Lives in You"
