= Bad Mood =

Bad mood may refer to:

- Bad mood

== Music ==
=== Albums ===
- Bad Mood (album), a 1993 album by Lonnie Gordon

=== Songs ===
- "Bad Mood" a song by Lonnie Gordon
- "Bad Mood", a song on Helmet's 1990 album Strap It On
- "Bad Mood", a 2017 song by Miley Cyrus from Younger Now
- "Bad Mood" (The Vaccines song), a 2013 song by The Vaccines
- "Bad Mood", a song by What's Eating Gilbert from That New Sound You're Looking For
