= Right Before My Eyes =

1988 song by Patti Day

Single by Patti Day
- Genre: House
- Label: Starway Records
- Songwriters: Michael Zager; Alexandra Forbes
- Producers: Michael Zager; Bruce Forest; Frank Heller

"Right Before My Eyes" is a 1988 song by Patti Day. It was remixed in New York by Bruce Forest and became a major club hit in the US and UK.

== Track listing ==
- UK/US vinyl (Bruce Forest mixes)

A1. "Right Before My Eyes" (House Vocal) - 4:57
B1. "Right Before My Eyes" (Extended Club Mix) - 6:11
B2. "Right Before My Eyes" (House Groove) - 5:28

== Charts ==
Chart (1989–1990)	Peak position
UK Indie	19
Chart (1991)	Peak position
UK Dance (Music Week)	57

== N'n'G version ==
"Right Before My Eyes"

Single by N'n'G featuring Kallaghan & MC Neat
- Released: 1998/2000
- Recorded: 1998
- Genre: UK garage
- Label: Heat Recordings; Urban Heat
- Songwriters: Michael Zager; Alexandra Forbes
- Producers: Grant Nelson; Norris Windross

In 1998, UK garage duo N'n'G (Grant Nelson and Norris Windross) released a garage cover of "Right Before My Eyes" featuring singer Kallaghan on vocals. This version peaked at No. 80 on the UK Singles Chart and No. 3 on the UK Dance Singles Chart. A remix of the song was released in 2000 and featured MC Neat, one half of the duo DJ Luck & MC Neat. This version was a hit, peaking at No. 12 on the UK Singles Chart and No. 1 on the UK Dance Singles Chart.

=== Track listing ===
- UK CD single (N'n'G feat. Kallaghan, 1998)
1. "Right Before My Eyes" (Radio Edit) - 3:53
2. "Right Before My Eyes" (Grant Nelson's Buckin' Fumpin' Vocal) - 5:54
3. "Right Before My Eyes" (Club Mix) - 5:46
- UK CD maxi-single (N'n'G feat. Kallaghan & MC Neat, 2000)
1. "Right Before My Eyes" ('The Remix' Edit) - 3:07
2. "Right Before My Eyes" (Club Mix Edit) - 3:38
3. "Right Before My Eyes" (Grant's Buckin' Fumpin' Remix) - 5:53
4. "Right Before My Eyes" ('The Remix') - 6:13

=== Charts ===
Chart (1998)	Peak position
UK Singles (OCC)	80
UK Dance (OCC)	3

== Other versions ==
In 1990, American singer Lonnie Gordon released her version as the B-side to "Happenin' All Over Again". It was later added as a bonus track on the 1991 CD release If I Have to Stand Alone. It was produced by the remixer of the Patti Day version, Bruce Forest.

In 2014, another version was released by UK singer Little Nikki.
