= If I Have to Stand Alone (song) =

Single by Lonnie Gordon

from the album If I Have to Stand Alone
- Released: 5 November 1990
- Genre: Dance-pop; disco
- Length: 3:25
- Label: Supreme Records
- Songwriters: Matt Aitken; Mike Stock; Pete Waterman
- Producer: Stock Aitken Waterman

Lonnie Gordon singles chronology
"Beyond Your Wildest Dreams" (1990)	"If I Have to Stand Alone" (1990)	"Gonna Catch You" (1991)

Music video
- "If I Have to Stand Alone" on YouTube

"If I Have to Stand Alone" is a song by American Hi-NRG and house singer Lonnie Gordon, released in November 1990 Supreme Records as the fourth and last single from her debut album by the same name (1990). Like the other tracks, it was written and produced by English songwriting and record producing trio Stock Aitken & Waterman, and a black-and-white music video was produced to promote the single. In spite of good critical reception, "If I Have to Stand Alone" did not manage to become a hit, remaining at the bottom of the charts in the countries where it was released.

== Critical reception ==
A reviewer from Music & Media commented, "Clearly inspired by 70s disco and bearing the trademark SAW production imprint. A nice little tune with loads of violins and a stampeding drum computer." Nick Robinson from Music Week wrote, "Written, arranged and produced by SAW, this sticks to a winning formula. The Supremes-meets-Gloria Gaynor vocals are coaxed along by that familiar chugging rhythm and vibrant backing". In 2017, Christian Guiltenane of British magazine Attitude praised the song as being a "fantastically noisy pop juggernaut" and an "anthem" he considered in some ways "better" than "Happenin' All Over Again", "sounding like the musical equivalent of a runaway train, and deserved huge success". A review published in 2021 on the Pop Rescue site said that "If I Have to Stand Alone" "bursts this 11 track album right open with some wonderful bleeping synths, before instantly screaming Stock/Aitken/Waterman's late 80's synth-pop style", and expressed sadeness about the single failure on the UK single chart.

== Chart performance ==
"If I Have to Stand Alone" debuted at a peak of number 68 on the UK Singles Chart on the chart edition of 17 November 1990, then dropped to number 85 and fell off the chart the next week. On the UK indie chart, it started at number 12 and stayed on the chart for three weeks. In February 1991, it also reached number 147 on the Australian Singles chart where it charted for four weeks.

== Track listing ==
- 7" single, UK
1. "If I Have to Stand Alone"
2. "If I Have to Stand Alone (Senza Voce)"
- 12" single, UK
1. "If I Have to Stand Alone" (Club Mix)
2. "If I Have to Stand Alone" (Dub Mix)
- CD maxi, UK
1. "If I Have to Stand Alone" (12" Version) – 6:12
2. "If I Have to Stand Alone" (12" Dub Version) – 4:20
3. "If I Have to Stand Alone" (7" Version) – 3:25
4. "If I Have to Stand Alone (Senza Voce)" – 3:16

== Charts ==
1990–1991 weekly chart performance for "If I Have to Stand Alone"
Chart (1990–1991)	Peak position
Australia (ARIA)	147
UK Singles (OCC)	68
UK Airplay (Music Week)	53
UK Indie (Music Week)	12
