= Sybilization =

Studio album by Sybil
- Released: October 19, 1990
- Genre: R&B
- Length: 47:36
- Label: Next Plateau; PWL
- Producer: Various

Sybil chronology
Sybil (1989)	Sybilization (1990)	Doin' It Now! (1993)

Singles from Sybilization
- 1. "Make It Easy on Me" Released: 1990; 2. "Open Up The Door" Released: 1991; 3. "Go On" Released: 1991; 4. "Let It Rain" Released: 1991; 5. "Lovely Day" Released: 1991

Professional ratings
Review scores
Source	Rating
AllMusic	3/5 stars

Sybilization is the third album by American singer Sybil, released in 1990.

== Background ==
Sybil worked with a myriad of producers for this album, including James Bratton, Eddie O'Loughlin, Stacey Harcum, Stock Aitken Waterman and others. It was released in quick succession to her previous album, which had been released a year before and Sybil had had her biggest hit up to that point in the UK with a cover of "Walk On By" in early 1990. The album and its singles, however, were ignored by both radio and record buyers and did not chart.

Cassandra Lucas and Charisse Rose, who went on to form the successful R&B group Changing Faces in the mid-1990s, sang backing vocals on three tracks on the album, including the single "Let It Rain". They also appear on the videoclip to that song.

The album includes a cover of Bill Withers' hit "Lovely Day", and also features a song from Sybil's first album, "Falling In Love", which was given a new remix. The last three songs on the album are released as a continuous medley titled "The Let It Rain All Night Suite".

The album spawned six singles. The lead single, "Make It Easy on Me", penned and produced by Stock Aitken Waterman was released in October 1990, but failed to gain much attention despite receiving good reviews for having a different sound to the trio of producers' usual Europop sound. Sybil would continue to work with Mike Stock and Pete Waterman for her next album Good 'N' Ready. The rest of the singles, released during 1991, failed to chart. These include "Open Up the Door", "Go On", "Let It Rain", and "Lovely Day". "Falling In Love" was released as a single exclusively in France, as a double a-side single with Sybil's 1988 single "Can't Wait (On Tomorrow)", featuring updated versions of both songs.

"Make It Easy on Me" and "Open Up the Door" were later included in new updated versions on Sybil's album Good 'N' Ready, and an updated "Let It Rain" was included on Sybil's album Doin' It Now!, both released in 1993.

== Track listing ==
No.	Title	Length
1.	"Make It Easy on Me"	4:15
2.	"Open Up the Door"	5:10
3.	"Love's Got a Hold on Me"	4:36
4.	"First Lessons In Love"	4:31
5.	"Go On"	5:21
6.	"Falling In Love"	5:00
7.	"Lovely Day"	4:41
8.	"The Let It Rain All Night Suite: (A) Let It Rain"	4:15
9.	"The Let It Rain All Night Suite: (B) I Wanna Know What It Means"	5:08
10.	"The Let It Rain All Night Suite: (C) Gentle Man"	4:45

French bonus track
No.	Title	Length
11.	"Can't Wait (On Tomorrow) (Straight Run Mix)"	5:13

German bonus track
No.	Title	Length
11.	"Lovely Day (UK Remix)"	3:59

== Charts ==
Chart	Peak position
US Top R&B Albums (Billboard)	70
