= Doin' It Now! =

Studio album by Sybil
- Released: March 9, 1993
- Genre: Pop; soul; R&B
- Length: 57:10
- Label: Next Plateau
- Producer: Various

Sybil chronology
Sybilization (1990)	Doin' It Now! (1993)	Good 'N' Ready (1993)

Singles from Doin' It Now!
- 1. "You're the Love of My Life" Released: 1993; 2. "The Love I Lost" Released: 1993

Professional ratings
Review scores
Source	Rating
AllMusic	3/5 stars

Doin' It Now! is the fourth studio album by American singer Sybil, released in 1993.

== Background ==
For this album, Sybil worked with different producers, including Mike Stock and Pete Waterman, Denise Rich, Prince Charles Alexander and others. The album was released in the US and Canada only. In Europe during the same year, Sybil released a different album titled Good 'N' Ready that shares four songs with Doin' It Now!: "You're the Love of My Life", "The Love I Lost", "Guarantee of Love" and "Now or Never", but otherwise both albums go in a different musical direction. Next Plateau, Sybil's label in the US, decided to showcase Sybil's R&B/soul sensibilities for the American market (which was popular at the time), whereas in Europe, PWL Records, Sybil's UK label, decided to release a more dance-orientated album with some Eurohouse sound as well as her soul music showcase.

The album includes two covers: the Harold Melvin & the Blue Notes song "The Love I Lost" and the standard "What a Diff'rence a Day Makes", first made famous by Dinah Washington in 1959. Two songs on Doin' It Now! had previously been released on other Sybil albums, although the versions included are different mixes: "Love's Calling" had previously been released on her 1989 album Sybil and "Let It Rain" had first been released on her 1990 album Sybilization, and released as a single in 1991.

== Singles ==
The first single from the album was a double A-side single of "You're the Love of My Life" (co-written by Sybil) and "The Love I Lost", which was released on its own in the UK and became Sybil's biggest hit there, peaking at #3. The single peaked at #90 on the US Billboard Hot 100, but both songs were bigger hits on other charts: "You're the Love of My Life" peaked at #37 on the R&B charts, while "The Love I Lost" peaked at #18 on the Dance chart. No further singles from the album were released in the US. However, "Beyond Your Wildest Dreams", a song included on the European Good 'N' Ready album, was released as a single in September 1993 in the US. The European version of the song was a ballad, whereas for the US market the song was given a hip-hop makeover and a male rapper was added to the song, making it a mid-tempo hip-hop/R&B song. It peaked at #90 in the R&B charts.

== Critical and commercial reception ==
Justin Kantor of AllMusic praised Sybil's voice but criticized the inconsistent material. The album failed to chart in the US.

== Track listing ==
1. "You're the Love of My Life" – 4:50
2. "We" – 4:30
3. "Oh, How I Love You" – 4:11
4. "Take Me Back" – 3:56
5. "Let It Rain" – 5:56
6. "Breathe a Prayer" – 4:39
7. "When It's Gone Away" – 4:20
8. "The Love I Lost" – 3:24
9. "Now or Never" – 4:00
10. "Guarantee of Love" – 4:01
11. "What a Diff'rence a Day Makes" – 5:56
12. "Love's Calling" – 3:40
13. "Back Together Again" – 3:38
