= Good 'N' Ready =

Studio album by Sybil
- Released: May 31st, 1993
- Genre: Pop; dance; R&B
- Label: Next Plateau; PWL

Sybil chronology
Doin' It Now! (1993)	Good 'N' Ready (1993)	Greatest Hits (1997)

Singles from Good 'N' Ready
- 1. "The Love I Lost" Released: 4 January 1993; 2. "When I'm Good and Ready" Released: 29 March 1993; 3. "Beyond Your Wildest Dreams" Released: June 1993; 4. "Stronger Together" Released: 31 August 1993

Professional ratings
Review scores
Source	Rating
Music Week	4/5 stars
NME	6/10
Smash Hits	3/5 stars

Good 'N' Ready is an album by American singer Sybil, released in 1993. It includes the singles "The Love I Lost" (UK No. 3), "When I'm Good and Ready" (UK No. 5), "Beyond Your Wildest Dreams" (UK No. 41) and "Stronger Together" (UK No. 41). The first six tracks on the album are produced by Mike Stock and Pete Waterman.

== Background ==
The album was only released in Europe. In the United States, Sybil released the album Doin' It Now! a few months earlier, sharing four songs with this album, but overall having a different sound: while Good 'N' Ready mixes her soul sound with the Stock/Waterman Euro-house, Doin' It Now!' is more straightforward American R&B/soul of that time. The song "You're the Love of My Life", included on both albums, was released as a US-only single.

The songs "Make It Easy on Me" and "Open Up the Door", included on this album, had been previously released on Sybil's 1990 album Sybilization, and released as singles in 1990 and 1991 respectively, although the versions included on Good 'N' Ready are new mixes.

The album was first released in the UK in June 1993, where it peaked at No. 13, Sybil's highest charting album in that country. When it was released in Europe, it had a different track listing, eliminating the remixes found at the end of the UK version in favour of some songs that had been included on the Doin' It Now! album.

== Critical reception ==
Johnny Dee from NME said that Good 'N' Ready "is a pop album in the great tradition of pop albums stretching back to the days of Ready Steady Go!" Tony Cross from Smash Hits felt the album "shows she hasn't lost a thing after a good few years in the music business." He added, "Sybil's album is a super soul-pop."

== Track listing ==
UK edition

1. "When I'm Good and Ready" – (3:31)
2. "The Love I Lost" – (4:10)
3. "Make It Easy on Me" – (3:55)
4. "Beyond Your Wildest Dreams" – (5:14)
5. "Stronger Together" – (3:24)
6. "Didn't See the Signs" – (3:04)
7. "Open Up the Door" – (5:04)
8. "Guarantee of Love" – (4:00)
9. "It's Now or Never" – (4:00)
10. "You're the Love of My Life" – (4:50)
11. "When I'm Good and Ready" (Jewels & Stone Mix) – (10:00)
12. "The Love I Lost" (Unrequited Mix) – (6:37)
13. "Beyond Your Wildest Dreams" (Dreamappella) – (3:28)

European edition

1. "When I'm Good and Ready"
2. "The Love I Lost"
3. "We"
4. "Beyond Your Wildest Dreams"
5. "Stronger Together"
6. "Didn't See the Signs"
7. "Guarantee of Love"
8. "Back Together Again"
9. "Now or Never"
10. "Take Me Back"
11. "You're the Love of My Life"
12. "Oh, How I Love You"
13. "When I'm Good and Ready" (Good 'N' Buzzin' Mix)

German edition

1. "When I'm Good and Ready"
2. "The Love I Lost"
3. "Make It Easy on Me"
4. "Beyond Your Wildest Dreams"
5. "Stronger Together"
6. "Didn't See the Signs"
7. "Open Up the Door"
8. "Guarantee of Love"
9. "We"
10. "Now or Never"
11. "Back Together Again"
12. "Oh, How I Love You"
13. "You're the Love of My Life"

== Charts ==
Chart (1993)	Peak position
UK Albums Chart	13
