= Make It Easy on Me =

Single by Sybil

from the album Sybilization
- Released: 1990
- Recorded: 1990
- Genre: Pop; R&B
- Length: 3:50
- Label: Next Plateau; PWL Records
- Songwriters: Mike Stock; Matt Aitken; Pete Waterman
- Producer: Stock Aitken & Waterman

Sybil singles chronology
"Walk On By" (1990)	"Make It Easy on Me" (1990)	"The Love I Lost" (1993)

"Make It Easy on Me" is a song by American R&B singer Sybil, written and produced by the British team Stock Aitken & Waterman. It was released in 1990 by Next Plateau and PWL Records as the lead single from her third album, Sybilization (1990). While Sybil had landed a deal in the UK with Pete Waterman's PWL Records for her previous album, Sybil, the song was her first direct involvement with the producers Stock Aitken & Waterman, although some of her previous singles had been remixed by the production team and their associates on PWL Records. Sybil later worked with Mike Stock and Pete Waterman on her 1993 album Good 'N' Ready, on which a remixed version of the song is included.

"Make It Easy on Me", a mid-tempo R&B jam, received good reviews (especially for signalling a different, more soulful and mature sound atypical of the producers' Europop fare), but failed to make an impact on the charts, barely making the UK top 100 peaking at #99, and peaking at #52 on the Billboard R&B charts.

== Critical reception ==
Larry Flick from Billboard magazine wrote, "Honey-voiced diva who scored big last year with back-to-back Dionne Warwick covers dives into her new Sybilization set and proves that she can tackle original material. Lithe and spirited midtempo charmer should work well at both radio and club levels."

== Cover versions ==
British pop group Steps covered the song on their 1999 album, Steptacular. It was sung as a solo by Lisa Scott-Lee.

== Charts ==
Chart (1990)	Peak position
Australia (ARIA)	160
Netherlands (Dutch Top 40 Tipparade)	14
Netherlands (Single Top 100)	76
UK Singles (OCC)	99
UK Airplay (Music Week)	57
US Hot Black Singles (Billboard)	52
