= Young Divas (album) =

Studio album by Young Divas
- Released: 14 November 2006
- Recorded: 2006
- Genre: Dance-pop, disco, house
- Length: 41:04
- Label: Sony BMG
- Producer: George Pappetros

Young Divas chronology
Young Divas (2006)	New Attitude (2007)

Singles from Young Divas
- 1. "This Time I Know It's for Real" Released: 6 May 2006; 2. "Happenin' All Over Again" Released: 11 November 2006; 3. "Searchin'" Released: 17 March 2007

Professional ratings
Review scores
Source	Rating
AllMusic	3/5 stars

Young Divas is the debut studio album by Australian girl group Young Divas, released on 14 November 2006 by Sony BMG. The group was initially formed for a one-off single and national tour to promote all members as solo artists. However, following the success of their debut single "This Time I Know It's for Real" and the tour, Sony BMG decided that the Young Divas would record a full-length album of classic disco and pop covers. The album debuted at number four on the ARIA Albums Chart and was certified double platinum by the Australian Recording Industry Association (ARIA), for shipments of 140,000 copies.

A cover of Donna Summer's "This Time I Know It's for Real" was released as the lead single from the album in May 2006. The song peaked at number two on the ARIA Singles Chart and was certified platinum. The second single, a cover of Lonnie Gordon's "Happenin' All Over Again", was released in November 2006. It peaked at number nine and was certified gold. A cover of Hazell Dean's "Searchin'" was released as the album's third and final single in March 2007, and peaked at number 40.

== Track listing ==
No.	Title	Writer(s)	Original artist	Length
1.	"What a Feeling"	Giorgio Moroder, Keith Forsey, Irene Cara	Irene Cara	3:43
2.	"This Time I Know It's for Real"	Donna Summer, Stock, Aitken & Waterman	Donna Summer	3:54
3.	"Right About Now"	Oliver Dommaschk, Stavros Ioannou, Errol Rennalls, Mousse T	Mousse T	3:47
4.	"Gloria"	Giancarlo Bigazzi, Umberto Tozzi, Trevor Veitch	Umberto Tozzi / covering the English version by Laura Branigan	3:47
5.	"Happenin' All Over Again"	Matt Aitken, Mike Stock, Pete Waterman	Lonnie Gordon	3:28
6.	"Searchin'"	Ian Anthony Stephens	Hazell Dean	3:33
7.	"Woman in Love"	Barry Gibb, Robin Gibb	Barbra Streisand	3:38
8.	"It's Raining Men"	Paul Jabara, Paul Shaffer	The Weather Girls	4:27
9.	"Let's Hear It for the Boy"	Tom Snow, Dean Pitchford	Deniece Williams	3:53
10.	"She Works Hard for the Money"	Donna Summer, Michael Omartian	Donna Summer	3:33
11.	"Say I'm Your No. 1"	Stock, Aitken, Waterman	Princess	3:38
12.	"You'll Never Stop Me Loving You"	Stock, Aitken, Waterman	Sonia	3:32

iTunes bonus track
No.	Title	Writer(s)	Original artist	Length
13.	"I Will Always Love You" (sung by Emily Williams)	Dolly Parton	Dolly Parton	4:32

== Charts and certifications ==
=== Weekly chart ===
Chart (2006)	Peak position
Australian Albums (ARIA)	4

=== Year-end charts ===
Chart (2006)	Rank
Australian Albums (ARIA)	38

=== Certification ===
Country	Certification
Australia (ARIA)	2× Platinum

== Release history ==
Country	Date	Format	Label
Australia	14 November 2006	Digital download	Sony BMG
Australia	9 December 2006	CD	Sony BMG
