= Sybil (album) =

Studio album by Sybil
- Released: September 20, 1989
- Genre: R&B; new jack swing
- Label: Next Plateau; PWL
- Producer: James Bratton; Delores Drewry; Eddie O'Loughlin; Gail "Sky" King; Howie Hersh; Kenni Hairston; Mac Quayle; Nephie Centeno; Trevor Gale; Ced-Gee; Soulshock & Cutfather

Sybil chronology
Let Yourself Go (1987)	Sybil (1989)	Sybilization (1990)

Singles from Sybilization
- 1. "Can't Wait (On Tomorrow)" Released: 1988; 2. "Don't Make Me Over" Released: 1989; 3. "Walk On By" Released: 1990; 4. "Crazy for You" Released: 1990; 5. "I Wanna Be Where You Are" Released: 1990

Professional ratings
Review scores
Source	Rating
AllMusic	4/5 stars
Spin	(favorable)

Sybil (titled Walk On By in the UK) is the second studio album by American singer Sybil, released in 1989. Five singles were released from the album; "Can't Wait (On Tomorrow)", which had been released as a standalone single in 1988, and two cover versions of the Burt Bacharach and Hal David-written Dionne Warwick songs "Don't Make Me Over" and "Walk On By", which were both released as singles in 1989 and 1990 respectively. These two singles became Sybil's first real big hits worldwide, and were followed by "Crazy for You" (featuring Salt-N-Pepa) and a cover of Michael Jackson's "I Wanna Be Where You Are".

The album itself became Sybil's biggest hit in North America, being her only album to enter the Billboard 200. It achieved its biggest sales in New Zealand, where "Don't Make Me Over" hit number one, and the album peaked at No. 3. "Don't Make Me Over" had been first released on Sybil's previous album Let Yourself Go, but had not been released as a single. The song "Love's Calling", which includes a sample of Grace Jones' "Don't Cry – It's Only the Rhythm" was later included, in a new remix, on Sybil's 1993 album Doin' It Now!.

== Track listing ==
No.	Title	Writer(s)	Producer(s)	Length
1.	"Don't Make Me Over"	Burt Bacharach; Hal David	James Bratton; Delores Drewry; Ron Wilmore (co.)	3:54
2.	"Love's Calling"	Soulshock; Cutfather; Keath Lowry; David Gaskins	Soulshock & Cutfather	3:45
3.	"I Wanna Be Where You Are"	Arthur Ross; Leon Ware	Howie Hersh; Nephie Centeno	3:52
4.	"Crazy for You" (featuring Salt-N-Pepa)	Trevor Gale; Kenni Hairston	Bratton; Hairston; Gale	4:27
5.	"Bad Beats Suite"	Ross; Ware	Bratton; Ced-Gee	3:12
6.	"Walk On By"	Bacharach; David	Bratton; Eddie O'Loughlin	3:53
7.	"Take Me Away"	Sybil Lynch; Gail "Sky" King; Mac Quayle	King; Quayle	4:08
8.	"Give It to Me"	Lynch; King; Quayle	King; Quayle	3:35
9.	"Living for the Moment"	Lynch; Hersh	Hersh	4:01
10.	"Can't Wait (On Tomorrow)"	Lynch; Bratton; Joe Maggio; Joel Washington		3:56
11.	"We're Gonna Make It Work This Time"	Drewry; Bratton; John T. Cherry		2:56
12.	"In My Dreams"	Bratton; Kelly Charles		3:45

== Charts ==
Chart	Peak position
Canadian Albums Chart	61
New Zealand Albums Chart	3
UK Albums Chart	21
US Billboard 200	75
US Top R&B Albums	12
