= Sybil (singer) =

American singer (born 1963)

- Born: Sybil Ilona Lynch; June 2, 1963 (age 63); Paterson, New Jersey, U.S.
- Genres: R&B; soul; pop; new jack swing; house
- Occupations: Singer, songwriter
- Instrument: Vocals
- Years active: 1986–present
- Labels: Next Plateau; Coalition

Sybil Ilona Lynch (born June 2, 1963), known mononymously as Sybil, is an American R&B and pop singer and songwriter. Sybil gained notable success in her career with songs during the mid-1980s into the mid-1990s. She is the cousin of En Vogue singer Maxine Jones.

== Career ==
Sybil signed to Next Plateau Records in the United States (with a licensing deal with Champion Records in the United Kingdom) and began recording in 1986 with the release of her first single "Falling in Love". The record reached the top 30 on the Dance charts and began a successful career for Sybil, releasing her debut album Let Yourself Go a year later. Let Yourself Go featured several minor R&B hits, including the title track, in addition to including her initial take on what would become her biggest hit, a cover version of the Dionne Warwick hit "Don't Make Me Over".

Two years later, Sybil released her self-titled second album, including a revamped version of "Don't Make Me Over", which achieved worldwide crossover success, along with another Warwick cover, "Walk On By", which were released in 1989 and 1990, respectively. The former became Sybil's biggest hit in the US, peaking at No. 20, and was a No. 1 hit in New Zealand. "Walk On By" is still, to date, the highest charting position for this Burt Bacharach/Hal David classic in the UK, peaking at No. 6, closely followed by Gabrielle (No. 7). The self-titled album became her biggest-selling album in the US. After being impressed by their remix work, Sybil signed with PWL Records for the UK market for this album, where it was titled Walk On By. Sybil would be signed to PWL Records until 1998.

Sybil's third album, Sybilization, was released in the fall of 1990, but went largely unnoticed. In January 1993, Sybil achieved her most successful hit in the UK charts, with a cover of "The Love I Lost" peaking at No. 3; its follow-up "When I'm Good and Ready" peaked at No. 5. That same year, Sybil released two different albums: Doin' It Now! in North America and Good 'N' Ready in Europe. While sharing four songs on their track listing, Doin' It Now! has a more R&B/soul sound, while Good N' Ready mixes her soul sound with Stock and Waterman-penned Europop. In the US, "The Love I Lost" was released as a double A-side with the Sybil co-penned original "You're the Love of My Life" as the first single of the album.

In 1997, Sybil terminated her contract with Next Plateau Records with a Greatest Hits album, and later that same year, she released her last album to date, Still a Thrill, which was released in Europe and Japan only. Afterward, Sybil kept a low profile, still touring and releasing new house/dance singles in the new millennium aimed at the club market. Sybil appeared on the UK version of the TV series Hit Me, Baby, One More Time in 2005 performing her hit "When I'm Good and Ready". Afterwards, she began working in education, formerly teaching lyric and songwriting composition and creative writing, and later becoming a program director and lead achievement coach at Guilford Technical Community College in Greensboro, North Carolina.

== Discography ==
=== Studio albums ===
Year	Album details	Peak chart positions					Certifications
Year	Album details	US	US R&B	CAN	NZ	UK	Certifications
1987	Let Yourself Go: Release date: 1987; Label: Next Plateau	—	—	—	—	92	
1989	Sybil ^{[A]}: Release date: September 20, 1989; Label: Next Plateau	75	12	61	3	21	RMNZ: Gold
1990	Sybilization: Release date: October 19, 1990; Label: Next Plateau	—	70	—	—	—	
1993	Doin' It Now!: Release date: March 3, 1993; Label: Next Plateau	—	—	—	—	—	
1993	Good 'N' Ready: Release date: May 14, 1993; Label: Next Plateau	—	—	—	—	13	
1997	Still a Thrill: Release date: December 8, 1997; Label: Coalition	—	—	—	—	—	
"—" denotes a recording that did not chart or was not released in that territory.

- ^{A} Album was released as Sybil in North America and Australasia and as Walk On By in the United Kingdom.

=== Compilation albums ===
- Greatest Hits (1997, Next Plateau)
- Sybil's Greatest Hits (2007)

=== Remix album ===
- Brighter Days: The Best Remix of Sybil (Japan only) (remix EP) (1998, eastwest)

=== Singles ===
Year	Single	Peak chart positions										Certifications	Album
Year	Single	US	US R&B	US Dan	AUS	CAN	GER	IRE	NLD	NZ	UK	Certifications	Album
1986	"Falling in Love"	—	—	29	—	—	—	—	—	—	68		Let Yourself Go
1987	"Let Yourself Go" (featuring Debbie Pender)	—	46	23	—	—	—	—	—	—	32		Let Yourself Go
1987	"My Love Is Guaranteed"	—	54	4	—	—	—	—	—	—	42		Let Yourself Go
1988	"Can't Wait (On Tomorrow)"	—	90	49	—	—	—	—	—	—	—		Sybil
1989	"Don't Make Me Over"	20	2	4	144	58	40	—	48	1	19	RIAA: Gold	Sybil
1989	"Walk On By"	74	3	7	—	—	—	21	15	2	6		Sybil
1989	"All Through the Night"	—	—	—	—	—	—	—	—	—	84		Let Yourself Go
1990	"Crazy 4 U" (featuring Salt-n-Pepa)	—	19	—	147	—	—	—	30	26	71		Sybil
1990	"I Wanna Be Where You Are"	—	86	—	—	—	—	—	—	—	—		Sybil
1990	"Make It Easy on Me"	—	52	—	160	—	—	—	76	—	99		Sybilization
1991	"Open Up the Door"	—	—	—	—	—	—	—	—	—	—		Sybilization
1991	"Go On"	—	78	—	—	—	—	—	—	—	—		Sybilization
1991	"Let It Rain"	—	—	—	—	—	—	—	—	—	—		Sybilization
1991	"Lovely Day"	—	—	—	—	—	—	—	—	—	—		Sybilization
1993	"You're the Love of My Life"	90	37	—	—	—	—	—	—	—	—		Doin' It Now!
1993	"The Love I Lost" (with West End)	90	—	18	145	—	68	9	—	—	3		Doin' It Now!
1993	"When I'm Good and Ready"	—	—	—	213	—	46	6	—	—	5		Good 'N' Ready
1993	"Beyond Your Wildest Dreams"	—	90	—	—	—	—	—	—	—	41		Good 'N' Ready
1993	"Stronger Together"	—	—	—	—	—	—	—	—	—	41		Good 'N' Ready
1993	"My Love Is Guaranteed" (Remix)	—	—	—	—	—	—	—	—	—	48		Non-album singles
1996	"So Tired of Being Alone"	—	—	—	—	—	—	—	—	—	53		Non-album singles
1997	"When I'm Good and Ready" (Remix)	—	—	—	—	—	—	—	—	—	66		Greatest Hits
1997	"Still a Thrill"	—	—	—	—	—	—	—	—	—	55		Still a Thrill
1997	"Why"	—	—	—	—	—	—	—	—	—	81		Still a Thrill
1998	"When I Fall in Love" (with The Klub Family)	—	—	—	—	—	—	—	—	—	—		Non-album singles
2002	"When I Fall in Love" (with Blaze)	—	—	—	—	—	—	—	—	—	91		Non-album singles
2002	"You Should've Told Me	—	—	—	—	—	—	—	—	—	—		Non-album singles
2006	"Don't Give Up"	—	—	—	—	—	—	—	—	—	—		Non-album singles
2006	"It's Too Late"	—	—	—	—	—	—	—	—	—	—		Non-album singles
2008	"Shining Star"	—	—	—	—	—	—	—	—	—	—		Non-album singles
2009	"Stronger (Can't Look Back)"	—	—	—	—	—	—	—	—	—	—		Non-album singles
2011	"Troubled Waters"	—	—	—	—	—	—	—	—	—	—		Non-album singles
2016	"Together You And I" (with The Four Kings)	—	—	—	—	—	—	—	—	—	—		Non-album singles
"—" denotes a recording that did not chart or was not released in that territory.

=== Featured singles ===
Year	Single	Artist	Peak	Album
Year	Single	Artist	US R&B	Album
1990	"Independent"	Salt-n-Pepa	85	Blacks' Magic

== Covers ==
Her song "Make It Easy On Me" was covered by Lisa Scott-Lee on the Steps album Steptacular. The hook of the song "Don't Make Me Over" is sampled on the Caron Wheeler track "I Adore You". "Let Yourself Go" was sampled by Shinji Hosoe on the track "Feeling Over" for Namco's 1994 racing game Ridge Racer.
