= Young Divas =

Australian pop girl group

- Genres: Dance; disco; pop
- Instrument: Vocals
- Years active: 2006–2008
- Label: Sony BMG
- Past members: Ricki-Lee Coulter (2006–2007); Paulini (2006–2008); Emily Williams (2006–2008); Kate DeAraugo (2006–2008); Jessica Mauboy (2007–2008)

Young Divas was an Australian pop girl group formed in 2006 by Sony BMG Australia, initially for a one-off single and national tour to promote all members as solo artists. The original line-up consisted of former Australian Idol contestants, including season one finalist Paulini, season two finalist Ricki-Lee Coulter, season three winner Kate DeAraugo and season three runner-up Emily Williams. Young Divas released a cover version of Donna Summer's "This Time I Know It's for Real" to attract attention for the tour. The song peaked at number two on the ARIA Singles Chart and was certified platinum by the Australian Recording Industry Association (ARIA).

Five months after the single's release, Young Divas released a second single in November 2006, a cover of Lonnie Gordon's "Happenin' All Over Again", which peaked at number nine and was certified gold. Their commercial success prompted the release of a self-titled debut album of classic disco and pop covers, establishing the Young Divas as an official group. The album debuted at number four on the ARIA Albums Chart and was certified double platinum for shipments of 140,000 units.

Coulter left the group in June 2007 to resume her solo career and was replaced by Idol season four runner-up Jessica Mauboy. The group's second and final album New Attitude (2007) debuted at number 10 and was certified gold. The album was preceded by a cover of Loverboy's "Turn Me Loose", which peaked at number 15 and was the group's final single. The Young Divas officially disbanded in 2008 with all members resuming their solo careers.

== History ==
=== 2006–07: Formation and Young Divas ===
Young Divas were formed in 2006 by Sony BMG Australia, initially for a 17-date national tour to promote all members as solo artists. The group released a cover version of Donna Summer's 1989 single "This Time I Know It's for Real" in May 2006, to attract attention for the tour, where all members would perform their solo material and songs as a group. A music video was also shot to accompany the single's release. In an interview with The Sydney Morning Herald, Coulter stated "We really want to get across that we're not a group. It's four big personalities and big voices getting on stage and showing what they can do. That was the idea behind the single – kind of showing off all of our vocals, together." Young Divas' version of "This Time I Know It's for Real" peaked at number two on the ARIA Singles Chart and remained in the top-ten for 14 consecutive weeks. It was certified platinum by the Australian Recording Industry Association (ARIA) for shipments of 70,000 units. Following its release, the group embarked on their Young Divas Live! Tour across Australia. Originally planned for a two-week period, the tour proved to be a success that extra dates were added and ran for three months, causing Coulter to postpone her wedding.

Five months after the single's release, Young Divas released a second single in November 2006, a cover of Lonnie Gordon's 1990 single "Happenin' All Over Again". The song peaked at number nine and was certified gold for shipments of 35,000 units. The group's commercial success prompted the release of a self-titled debut album of classic disco and pop covers, on 14 November 2006, establishing the Young Divas as an official group. The album debuted at number four on the ARIA Albums Chart and was certified double platinum for shipments of 140,000 units. A cover of Hazell Dean's 1983 single "Searchin'" was released as the group's third single in March 2007, and peaked at number 40.

=== 2007–09: Line-up change, New Attitude and disbandment ===
In February 2007, it was announced that the Young Divas had pulled out of their scheduled national tour supporting Irish boy band Westlife. The announcement of the cancellation came at a time when rumours began circulating that Coulter was set to leave the group, due to clashes with other members. During this time, Coulter headed overseas to work on her next solo album, and was temporarily replaced by Williams' older sister and former Australian Idol contestant Lavina Williams. The rumours were denied by the group's manager David Champion, who conceded that Coulter would return for the group's next national tour and for the recording of their second album. He also stated that her solo commitments was one of the reasons the Young Divas pulled out of the tour, but also claimed that their growing popularity meant they were too successful to be a supporting act. However, on 22 June 2007, it was announced that Coulter had left the group to resume her solo career and to marry her fiancé Jamie Babbington. She told Qconfidential, "I just couldn't do it all – I really had to get back to doing what I love doing, and that's my solo career. ... The girls have been great, they understand completely. They know where I'm coming from."

During this time, rumours began to circulate that Lavina Williams, Casey Donovan or Jessica Mauboy would be Coulter's replacement in the Young Divas. However, during an Australian Idol concert at Federation Square in Melbourne on 26 September 2007, it was revealed that Mauboy was chosen as the new member. Her management saw the Young Divas as a perfect learning curve about all that was positive and negative in the music industry. The group released their second studio album New Attitude on 26 November 2007, which debuted at number 10 and was certified gold. A cover of Loverboy's 1980 single "Turn Me Loose", featuring New Zealand rapper Savage, was released the album's first single, and peaked at number 15. On 28 March 2008, Sony BMG announced in The Daily Telegraph that due to the poor sales of "Turn Me Loose", a second single would not be released from New Attitude. They also stated that the Young Divas were not being dropped and would continue to record music.

During a visit to Indonesia in June 2008, Mauboy told The Jakarta Post that she had begun working on her debut solo album, and that its first single would be released in August of that year, with the album launch planned for September. Paulini's fan site also reported in July 2008 that Paulini was working on her next solo album with the production team at PLW Studios in Melbourne. On 24 August 2008, a press release from Sony BMG confirmed that both Mauboy and Paulini had left the group to resume their solo careers. Paulini's manager at the time stated that her decision to leave "is totally amicable with the other girls. She just wants to continue on with her solo career. There is no animosity, there is nothing negative." The group's manager stated "the spirit of the Young Divas will live on in a new incarnation with a third album once the new line-up is finalised. Think of the Young Divas not so much as an act but a finishing school for future superstars." However, a second line-up change never occurred, leaving Williams' and DeAraugo to resume their solo careers.

On 4 April 2009, Paulini, Williams and DeAraugo reunited to perform "This Time I Know It's for Real" at the Bendigo Says Thanks concert in Bendigo, Victoria. The concert was held to thank the workers and volunteers who helped those affected by the Black Saturday bushfires.

In 2021, DeAraugo and Williams recorded a cover of Kelly Clarkson's "Underneath the Tree". Their version was produced by Max Kourilov and Bish Malik and released digitally as A Young Divas Production on 17 December 2021.

== Discography ==
- Young Divas (2006)
- New Attitude (2007)

== Tours ==
- Young Divas Live! Tour (2006)

== Awards and nominations ==
Year	Type	Recipient	Award	Result
2006	Nickelodeon Australian Kids' Choice Awards	"This Time I Know It's for Real"	Fave Song	Won
2006	Nickelodeon Australian Kids' Choice Awards	Young Divas	Fave Australian Group	Nominated
