= Bad Mood (album) =

Studio album by Lonnie Gordon
- Released: 1993
- Genre: Pop
- Label: SBK/EMI Records

Lonnie Gordon chronology
If I Have to Stand Alone (1990)	Bad Mood (1993)	No Regret (2000)

Singles from Bad Mood
- 1. "Gonna Catch You" Released: 1991; 2. "Bad Mood" Released: 1993; 3. "Happenin' All Over Again '93" Released: 1993; 4. "Do You Want It?" Released: 1994

Professional ratings
Review scores
Source	Rating
AllMusic	2.5/5 stars
Music Week	3/5 stars

Bad Mood is the second album by American musician Lonnie Gordon. It was released in 1993 on SBK/EMI Records. The album is her most commercially successful to date. It was produced primarily by the group Black Box. The album includes the hit singles "Gonna Catch You" (originally released in 1991), "Happening All Over Again" (a 1993 remix of her 1990 hit), "Bad Mood" and "Do You Want It?". It includes covers of Gloria Gaynor's hit "I Will Survive" and Donny Hathaway's "Little Ghetto Boy".

Three of its singles, "Gonna Catch You", "Bad Mood" and "Happenin' All Over Again '93", all peaked at #1 on the U.S. Dance charts.

== Critical reception ==
AllMusic editor Michael Gallucci said, "Gordon's three big club hits -- 'Bad Mood', 'Gonna Catch You', 'Happening All Over Again'—are on her debut album, which is sort of a patchwork piece, gathering songs from a four-year period. You won't notice, though, since most of her dance jams stick to the same groove. Besides the aforementioned trio, this is pretty much standard fare." Larry Flick from Billboard complimented 'Do You Want It?', saying, "Gordon earns a couple more diva stripes on this delicious pop/house invitation to romance. Her fine, forceful vocal is perfectly matched by hearty grooves and infectious synth passages provided by the magical mixing hands of David Morales and New Jersey's Smack production clique."

Alan Jones from Music Week wrote, "Disco diva Lonnie Gordon uses her pipes to good effect, notably on the title track (one of several contributed by Black Box) and a remix of her finest PWL effort, 'Happening All Over Again'. But there's more to this album than sheer lung power; 'Stay Together' and 'Missing You' are classy ballads. A fine effort overall, the album's fate rather depends on singles success, something which the title track should deliver. The only problem could be if the import doublepack single that's been around for months has already satisfied demand."

== Track listing ==
1. "Love Can Turn Around"
2. "Bad Mood"
3. "Sing a Song"
4. "Little Ghetto Boy"
5. "Missing You"
6. "Gonna Catch You"
7. "Happening All Over Again (’93 remix)"
8. "Do You Want It?
9. "Stay Together"
10. "Your Touch"
11. "I Will Survive"
12. "Don't Stop Lovin' Me, Baby"
