= If I Have to Stand Alone =

Studio album by Lonnie Gordon
- Released: November 26, 1990 (Europe); February 25, 1991 (Japan); April 8, 1991 (Australia); April 13, 2009 (Special Edition)
- Recorded: 1989–1990
- Genre: Dance-pop; house
- Label: Supreme; Cherry Pop (2009 reissue)
- Producer: Stock Aitken Waterman; Phil Harding; Ian Curnow; Rodney Ascue; Paul Dakeyne; Yvonne Turner

Lonnie Gordon chronology
If I Have to Stand Alone (1990)	Bad Mood (1993)

Singles from If I Have to Stand Alone
- 1. "It’s Not Over" Released: 1989; 2. "Happenin' All Over Again" Released: January 1990; 3. "Beyond Your Wildest Dreams" Released: July 1990; 4. "If I Have to Stand Alone" Released: November 1990

If I Have to Stand Alone is the debut album by American Hi-NRG and house singer Lonnie Gordon, released in 1990 on Supreme Records. It includes Gordon's breakthrough hit "Happenin' All Over Again", which was a top 10 hit in the UK and Ireland. However, the two follow-up singles, "Beyond Your Wildest Dreams" and "If I Have to Stand Alone" did not fare as well. The album was released in parts of continental Europe in late 1990, and Japan and Australia in early 1991, albeit in limited quantity, and was not released in the UK until a Cherry Pop reissue in 2009 — although it was originally planned to be released on February 4, 1991. The album was also released in South Africa in 1990.

== Background and production ==
Most of the album was produced by British hitmaking team Stock Aitken Waterman or their associates Phil Harding and Ian Curnow. The album also includes Gordon's debut single for the label, "It's Not Over", which was released in September 1989. The album incorporates Stock Aitken Waterman's typical Europop sound, but also adding influences of the Italo house scene that was big in the UK charts in late 1989/1990.

Gordon recorded two more tracks which were not included on the album: "How Could He Do This to Me" (produced by Stock Aitken Waterman, and originally the planned follow-up to "Happenin' All Over Again"), and "Just a Matter of Time" (produced by Harding and Curnow). The former was later issued in the late 1990s on a dance compilation. Both were later released through iTunes in 2009.

== Critical reception ==
In July 2018, Mark Elliot of Classic Pop considered If I Have to Stand Alone as the 12th best album ever produced by Stock Aitken Waterman and lamented the poor chart performances of the last two singles. A review published in 2021 on the Pop Rescue site gave the album three stars out of five, adding that it is curious that "Happenin' All Over Again" was the only hit single from the album, since SAW and their team are highly recognisable in this work which uses "a few drums sequences, synths, samples, or vocal styles, that were incorporated into what became hits for Kylie, Sonia, and Big Fun throughout this album". The review also noted Gordon's powerful vocals which perfectly fit with dance songs, praised many tracks but considered "Best of Friends", "I Need You" and "Right Before My Eyes" as the weakest songs from the album.

== Track listing ==
All songs written by Mike Stock, Matt Aitken and Pete Waterman, except where noted.

=== Original version ===
No.	Title	Writer(s)	Length
1.	"If I Have to Stand Alone"		3:25
2.	"Happenin' All Over Again" (Hip House Radio Mix)		3:21
3.	"Better Off Without You"		3:41
4.	"Beyond Your Wildest Dreams"		6:48
5.	"I Need You"	Bill Clift; Phil Harding; Ian Curnow	4:07
6.	"That's No Reason"		3:27
7.	"Best of Friends"		4:00
8.	"It's Not Over"	Bruce Gray; Bruce Hawes	3:51
9.	"Watching You"	Lonnie Gordon	3:36
10.	"Helpless Hearts"	Clift	3:32

CD bonus track

No.	Title	Writer(s)	Length
11.	"Right Before My Eyes" (NY Mix)	Alexandra Forbes; Michael Zager	5:47

=== 2009 Special Edition ===
In April 2009, UK label Cherry Pop reissued the album, including several bonus tracks, marking the first time the album was available worldwide. The reissue includes "How Could He Do This to Me", a track Gordon recorded for the album but was not originally included, as well as several remixes, some of them previously unreleased.

No.	Title	Writer(s)	Length
1.	"If I Have to Stand Alone"		3:25
2.	"Happenin' All Over Again"		3:20
3.	"Better Off Without You"		3:45
4.	"Beyond Your Wildest Dreams"		3:14
5.	"I Need You"	Clift; Harding; Curnow	4:05
6.	"That's No Reason"		3:27
7.	"Best of Friends"		4:00
8.	"It's Not Over (Let No Man Put Asunder)"	Gray; Hawes	3:36
9.	"Watching You"	Gordon	3:37
10.	"Helpless Hearts"	Clift	3:32

Bonus tracks

No.	Title	Length
11.	"How Could He Do This to Me" (7" Mix)	3:11
12.	"Happenin' All Over Again" (Tony King 1990 Mix)	5:51
13.	"If I Have to Stand Alone" (Original 12" Mix)	6:15
14.	"Better Off Without You" (Extended Version)	7:36
15.	"Happenin' All Over Again" (Dave Ford 1990 Mix)	6:31
16.	"How Could He Do This to Me" (Extended Version)	5:55
17.	"Best of Friends" (Extended Version)	7:54

== Personnel ==
- Matt Aitken – guitar, keyboards
- Rodney Ascue – mixing, producer
- Patrick Boothe – background vocals
- Bill Clift – background vocals
- Ian Curnow – drums, engineer, keyboards, mixing, producer
- Paul Dakeyne – producer
- Peter Day – engineer
- Gordon Dennis – assistant engineer
- Richard Dowling – assistant engineer
- Dave Ford – mixing
- Alan Friedman – programming
- Dillon Gallagher – assistant engineer
- Julian Gingell – assistant engineer
- Lonnie Gordon – primary artist
- Peter Hammond – mixing
- Phil Harding – bass, engineer, mixing, producer
- Karen Hewitt – engineer
- Tony King – remixing
- A. Linn – drums
- Chris McDonnell – assistant engineer
- Mae McKenna – background vocals
- John Michael Palmer – design, remastering
- John Parthum – assistant engineer
- Les Sharma – assistant engineer
- Mike Stock – keyboards, background vocals
- Miriam Stockley – background vocals
- Barry Stone – assistant engineer
- Philip Todd – saxophone
- Yvonne Turner – mixing, producer, background vocals
- Paul Waterman – assistant engineer
- Russell Young – photography

== Charts ==
Chart (1991)	Peak position
Australian Albums (ARIA)	173
Swedish Albums (Sverigetopplistan)	42
