= This Time I Know It's for Real =

1989 single by Donna Summer

Single by Donna Summer

from the album Another Place and Time
- B-side: "If It Makes You Feel Good" (US); "Whatever Your Heart Desires" (Europe)
- Released: February 13, 1989
- Studio: PWL (London, England)
- Genre: Dance-pop; Eurodance; hi-NRG
- Length: 3:38
- Label: Warner Bros. (Europe); Atlantic (US)
- Songwriters: Donna Summer; Matt Aitken; Mike Stock; Pete Waterman
- Producer: Stock, Aitken & Waterman

Donna Summer singles chronology
"All Systems Go" (1988)	"This Time I Know It's for Real" (1989)	"I Don't Wanna Get Hurt" (1989)

Music video
- "This Time I Know It's for Real" on YouTube

"This Time I Know It's for Real" is a song by American singer-songwriter Donna Summer, released on February 13, 1989, as the first single from her 14th studio album, Another Place and Time (1989), by Atlantic Records and Warner Bros. Records. Like the rest of the album, the song was written and produced by the British Stock Aitken Waterman (SAW) team, though Summer also had a hand in writing this song.

The song became Summer's first top-10 hit in the United Kingdom since 1979, reaching number three and spending a total of 14 weeks in the UK Singles Chart top 75. It reached number seven in both the United States and Canada, becoming Summer's 14th and final top-10 hit on the US Billboard Hot 100 as well as the last top-40 hit of her career. The song was also successful on the Billboard Adult Contemporary chart, peaking at number two.

== Background ==
Summer became aware of SAW after her husband, Bruce Sudano, drew her attention to their work during a visit to Europe. She was further encouraged by Rick Astley's subsequent success, saying she "loved his production". Hitting it off with the producers immediately, Summer recalled that the song came together on their first day working together, a rare case of "hitting the nail on the head the first time". While she was enthusiastic, her then US label boss David Geffen wanted a rockier sound with more guitars from the SAW sessions, a diktat which was immediately refused by Pete Waterman.

With Geffen Records ending her US deal due to an impasse over the new material, this was Summer's first US single to be released on Atlantic Records. Since 1980 she had been signed to Geffen, but her work across Europe had always been distributed by Warner Bros.' main label. This would continue to be the case following her signing to Atlantic.

== Critical reception ==
=== Initial response ===
Alex Henderson from AllMusic described the song as a "exuberant, club-friendly Euro-dance/Hi-NRG" gem. Jim Arundel from Melody Maker declared it as "gloriously driven, simple, joyous and just a bit sad too." Pan-European magazine Music & Media commented, "Very much a SAW production with Summer's voice adding a touch of class. Her first chance of a major hit since 1983's 'She Works Hard for the Money'." Jerry Smith of Music Week described the song as an "irritatingly catchy, lightly soulful dance tune that is sure of a high chart placing".

=== Impact and legacy ===
In 2014, Matt Dunn of WhatCulture ranked the song at number 11 in his "15 unforgettable Stock Aitken Waterman singles" list, stating that he found the lyrics "simple enough" and the video "odd", as it shows "people jumping up and down, bootscooters, clapping hands, spinning train conductors, flamenco dancers, people swimming through lights and others dancing on top of trains and boats", but eventually considered that this SAW song contributed to "reviv[e] the career of a former disco diva". In its 2016 retrospective review, Pop Rescue also stated that the song "simply oozes S/A/W sound from the very first moment it bursts open with some very Rick Astley/Sonia-esque drums. This is textbook S/A/W and is absolutely flawless."

In 2021, British magazine Classic Pop ranked the song number nine in their list of "Top 40 Stock Aitken Waterman songs", underlining its success on the charts. In 2022, Rick Henry Christopher from Vocal Media ranked the song Summer's 26th greatest song (out of 30), deeming it as "the standard Eurodisco SAW". In 2023, Alexis Petridis of The Guardian listed the song at number eight in his "Stock Aitken Waterman's 20 greatest songs – ranked!", adding that it "is gleaming dance-pop with a nailed-on euphoric chorus". In 2024, Thomas Curtis-Horsfall of UK station radio Smooth Radio listed the song at number ten in his list of Summer's 10 greatest songs, calling the association with SAW an "inspired decision". In 2025, Thomas Edward of Smooth Radio also ranked the song 11th in his list of "Stock Aitken Waterman's 15 greatest songs, ranked".

== Chart performance ==
"This Time I Know It's for Real" reached the top-ten in the majority of the countries in which it was released. In the US, it charted for 17 weeks on the Billboard Hot 100 with a peak at number seven in its tenth week on the chart on June 24, 1989, thus becoming Summer's 14th and last top ten hit in the country, six years after the top three hit "She Works Hard for the Money". It also reached number two on the Billboard Adult Contemporary, number five on the Dance Club Songs, and number one on the Dance Singles Sales chart. In the UK, "This Time I Know It's for Real" charted for 14 weeks and hit number three in its fifth week, on March 19, 1989, thus marking Summer's return to the top ten after ten years of absence, her previous top ten hit being "No More Tears (Enough Is Enough)", released in 1979.

In Continental Europe, "This Time I Know It's for Real" achieved its highest position in the Flanders part of Belgium where it reached number two, being blocked from the number one slot by Madonna's "Like a Prayer" which topped the chart then, and featured on the chart for 12 weeks. In France, after a debut at number 43, it reached number six twice and remained in the top 50 for a total of 18 weeks, becoming Summer's highest peak position in the country. It was also a top-three hit in Finland and Norway, attained number four in Ireland, number five in the Netherlands, and number six in Canada. In addition, it peaked within the top-20 in Sweden, West Germany, Spain, and Italy, and barely made top-40 in Australia where it charted for ten weeks. On the Music & Media's European Hot 100 Singles chart, "This Time I Know It's for Real" spent 26 weeks with two weeks at a peak of number seven, and being much aired on radios, had a 17-week chart run on the European Airplay Top 50 where it reached number eight.

== Track listings ==
- 7-inch single
1. "This Time I Know It's for Real" – 3:36
2. "Whatever Your Heart Desires" (original mix) – 3:50
- 12-inch maxi
1. "This Time I Know It's for Real" (extended version) – 7:20
2. "Whatever Your Heart Desires" (original mix) – 3:50
3. "This Time I Know It's for Real" (instrumental) – 3:34

== Charts ==
=== Weekly charts ===
1989 weekly chart performance for "This Time I Know It's for Real"
Chart (1989)	Peak position
Australia (ARIA)	40
Belgium (Ultratop 50 Flanders)	2
Canada Top Singles (RPM)	6
Canada Adult Contemporary (RPM)	2
Canada Dance/Urban (RPM)	1
Europe (Eurochart Hot 100)	7
Europe (European Airplay Top 50)	8
Finland (Suomen virallinen lista)	3
France (SNEP)	6
Ireland (IRMA)	4
Italy (Musica e dischi)	20
Italy Airplay (Music & Media)	14
Luxembourg (Radio Luxembourg)	2
Netherlands (Dutch Top 40)	5
Netherlands (Single Top 100)	6
Norway (VG-lista)	3
Panama (UPI)	6
Quebec (ADISQ)	1
Spain (AFYVE)	19
Sweden (Sverigetopplistan)	12
UK Singles (Official Charts)	3
UK Dance (Music Week)	1
US Billboard Hot 100	7
US Adult Contemporary (Billboard)	2
US Dance Club Songs (Billboard)	5
US Dance Singles Sales (Billboard)	1
US Cash Box Top 100	6
US Dance Tracks (Dance Music Report)	1
West Germany (GfK)	15

=== Year-end charts ===
1989 year-end chart performance for "This Time I Know It's for Real"
Chart (1989)	Position
Belgium (Ultratop 50 Flanders)	29
Canada Top Singles (RPM)	75
Europe (Eurochart Hot 100)	34
Netherlands (Dutch Top 40)	44
Netherlands (Single Top 100)	60
UK Singles (OCC)	22
US Billboard Hot 100	92
US 12-inch Singles Sales (Billboard)	21
US Adult Contemporary (Billboard)	17
US Dance Club Play (Billboard)	46
West Germany (Media Control)	56

== Certifications ==
Certifications for "This Time I Know It's for Real"
Region	Certification	Certified units/sales
United Kingdom (BPI)	Silver	200,000^{^}
United States (RIAA)	Gold	500,000^{^}
^{^} Shipments figures based on certification alone.

== Young Divas version ==
"This Time I Know It's for Real"

Single by Young Divas

from the album Young Divas
- Released: May 6, 2006
- Recorded: 2006
- Label: Sony BMG
- Songwriters: Donna Summer; Matt Aitken; Mike Stock; Pete Waterman
- Producers: George Papapetros; Max Kourilov

Young Divas singles chronology
"This Time I Know It's for Real" (2006)	"Happenin' All Over Again" (2006)

Audio video
- "This Time I Know It's for Real" on YouTube

Australian girl group Young Divas covered "This Time I Know It's for Real" to coincide with nationwide tour dates from July to August 2006. The song was produced by George Papapetros and Max Kourilov and released as a CD single on May 6, 2006, to attract attention for the tour. "This Time I Know It's for Real" peaked at number two on the ARIA Singles Chart and spent 14 weeks in the top ten. It was certified platinum by the Australian Recording Industry Association (ARIA), for shipments of 70,000 copies. The song was later included on their self-titled debut album Young Divas. Due to an overwhelming response of the Young Divas' version of "This Time I Know It's for Real", a music video was filmed to accompany the song's release.

=== Track listing ===
- CD single
1. "This Time I Know It's for Real" (Radio Edit)
2. "This Time I Know It's for Real" (Extended Remix)

=== Personnel ===
- Vocals – Emily Williams, Kate DeAraugo, Paulini, Ricki-Lee Coulter
- Songwriting – Donna Summer, Matt Aitken, Mike Stock, Pete Waterman
- Production - George Papapetros, Max Kourilov
- Mixing – George Papapetros, Max Kourilov
- Arrangements – George Papapetros, Max Kourilov
- Mastering – Oscar Gaona, Tom Coyne

=== Weekly charts ===
Weekly chart performance for "This Time I Know It's for Real" by Young Divas
Chart (2006)	Peak position
Australia (ARIA)	2

=== Year-end charts ===
Year-end chart performance for "This Time I Know It's for Real" by Young Divas
Chart (2006)	Rank
Australia (ARIA)	6
Australian Artists (ARIA)	2

=== Certifications ===
Certifications for "This Time I Know It's for Real" by Young Divas
Region	Certification	Certified units/sales
Australia (ARIA)	Platinum	70,000^{^}
^{^} Shipments figures based on certification alone.

== Other cover versions ==
In 2004, British singer Kelly Llorenna reached number fourteen on the UK Singles Chart with her version of the song.
