= Beyond Your Wildest Dreams =

Song written by Stock Aitken & Waterman

Single by Lonnie Gordon

from the album If I Have to Stand Alone
- Released: 30 July 1990
- Genre: Soul-pop
- Length: 3:10 (7" mix): 6:48
- Label: Supreme UK
- Songwriters: Matt Aitken; Mike Stock; Pete Waterman
- Producer: Stock Aitken & Waterman

Lonnie Gordon singles chronology
"Happenin' All Over Again" (1990)	"Beyond Your Wildest Dreams" (1990)	"If I Have to Stand Alone" (1990)

Music video
- "Beyond Your Wildest Dreams" on YouTube

"Beyond Your Wildest Dreams"

Single by Sybil

from the album Good 'N' Ready
- Released: 14 June 1993
- Genre: Pop-dance
- Length: 3:18
- Label: PWL; Next Plateau
- Songwriters: Matt Aitken; Mike Stock; Pete Waterman
- Producers: Mike Stock; Pete Waterman

Sybil singles chronology
"When I'm Good and Ready" (1993)	"Beyond Your Wildest Dreams" (1993)	"Stronger Together" (1993)

"Beyond Your Wildest Dreams" is a ballad written by British hitmaking team Stock Aitken & Waterman, which was recorded by three of their artists, Lonnie Gordon, Sybil, and Nancy Davis. The songwriters have cited this song as one of the best they ever wrote, and were dissatisfied with its poor chart performance. Gordon and Sybil's versions were released as singles in 1990 and 1993.

== Background ==
"Beyond Your Wildest Dreams" was written for American singer-songwriter Lonnie Gordon, and was released as the follow-up to her breakthrough top 10 hit "Happenin' All Over Again". Initially the follow-up single was going to be another song, the uptempo "How Could He Do This To Me", however disagreements with the label led to a change of the single choice and "Beyond Your Wildest Dreams" was released instead. These disagreements created a delay on the release of the single and it was finally released in August 1990, seven months after "Happenin' All Over Again" had entered the UK charts. The song was later included on Gordon's 1991 debut album, If I Have to Stand Alone, in an extended version.

Later, in 1993, American artist Sybil worked with Mike Stock and Pete Waterman (by that time, Matt Aitken had left the trio), and had two top 10 hits with a cover of "The Love I Lost" and the Stock/Waterman original "When I'm Good and Ready". Her cover of "Beyond Your Wildest Dreams" was chosen as the third single off her fifth album, Good 'N' Ready (1993), and was released in June 1993. Later in 1993, Sybil released the album in the United States, retitled Doin' It Now! and featuring a different track listing from the Good 'N' Ready album, omitting some tracks and adding new ones. Although "Beyond Your Wildest Dreams" was not included on the Doin' It Now! album, it was released as the second single off it in September 1993. The US single version is a very different hip-hop styled remix with a male rapper. Sybil filmed video clips for both versions of the song.

== Critical reception ==
Both versions of "Beyond Your Wildest Dreams" were complimented by reviewers at the time of their respective release.

=== Lonnie Gordon version ===
Pan-European magazine Music & Media commented, "...this Philadelphia-born singer has now teamed-up with the SAW production team. The result is excellent. A smooth soul/pop record that gives Gordon's excellent voice every chance to shine. Reminiscent of SAW's Donna Summer collaboration." David Giles from Music Week wrote, "Follow-up to her top five hit 'Happenin' All Over Again', but a distinct shift in style for the SAW production team moving away from the Hi-NRG field towards a mellower, laid-back soulful feel." Gordon herself praised the quality of the record and credited producers Stock Aitken Waterman for making a credible R&B ballad in tune with the trends of the time.

=== Sybil version ===
Larry Flick from Billboard magazine wrote, "British pop hit has been added to Sybil's current Doin' It Now opus. Percolating pop/dance ditty glides along at a friendly pace, with a silky vocal, rousing hand-claps, and appropriate hip-hop beat flavors." Alan Jones from Music Week gave it a score of four out of five, adding, "After her two club hits, Sybil drops a few bpms to forge an attractive shuffle beat for this remake of the song first recorded by Lonnie Gordon. A majestic performance ensures that this will be yet another hit." James Hamilton from the Record Mirror Dance Update described it as "pleasant classy".

== Chart performance ==
Gordon's version of "Beyond Your Wildest Dreams" entered at a peak of number 48 on the UK Singles Chart, where it remained for two weeks. Gordon expressed her deep sadness over the failure of the single, and its role in derailing the commercial prospects of her album, arguing that an upbeat song in the vein of her prior hit should have been chosen instead.

Sybil's version of the song charted higher than the original version, but it only managed a number-41 peak on the UK Singles Chart, with two weeks of presence on the chart. It peaked at number 90 on the Hot R&B/Hip-Hop Songs chart, and also charted on the Bubbling Under R&B/Hip-Hop Singles chart.

== Track listings ==
- CD single (France)
1. "Beyond Your Wildest Dreams" 6:48
2. "Beyond Your Wildest Dreams" (senza voce) 3:48
3. "Beyond Your Wildest Dreams" 3:15

== Charts ==
Weekly chart performance for "Beyond Your Wildest Dreams" (by Gordon)
Chart (1990)	Peak position
Australia (ARIA)	104
UK Singles (OCC)	48
UK Dance (Music Week)	29

Weekly chart performance for "Beyond Your Wildest Dreams" (by Sybil)
Chart (1993)	Peak position
UK Singles (OCC)	41
UK Airplay (ERA)	58
UK Dance (Music Week)	13
UK Club Chart (Music Week)	6
US Hot R&B/Hip-Hop Songs (Billboard)	90
