= Don't Make Me Over (song) =

1962 single by Dionne Warwick

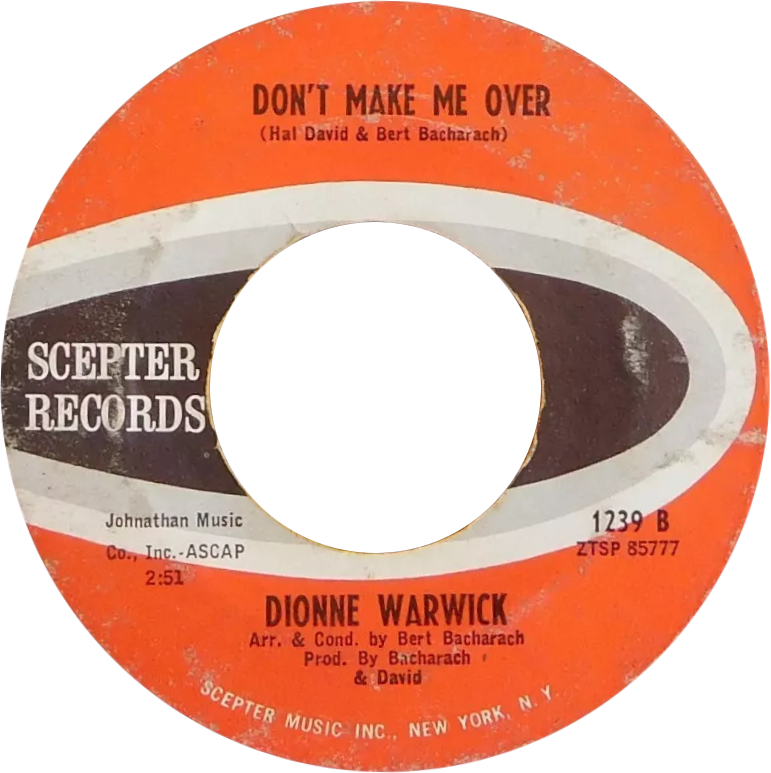
- One of the variants of the US single (side B label)

Single by Dionne Warwick

from the album Presenting Dionne Warwick
- B-side: "I Smiled Yesterday"
- Released: October 1962
- Recorded: August 1962
- Studio: Bell Sound (New York City)
- Length: 2:46
- Label: Scepter
- Songwriters: Burt Bacharach; Hal David
- Producers: Burt Bacharach; Hal David

Dionne Warwick singles chronology
"Don't Make Me Over" (1962)	"This Empty Place" (1963)

"Don't Make Me Over" is a song written by Burt Bacharach and Hal David, originally recorded by American singer Dionne Warwick in August 1962 and released as the B-side of "I Smiled Yesterday" in October 1962 as her lead solo single from her debut album, Presenting Dionne Warwick (1963), issued under Scepter Records. The song reached number 21 on the US Billboard Hot 100 and number five on the Billboard Hot R&B Singles chart.

== Dionne Warwick original ==
Warwick recorded "Don't Make Me Over" in August 1962, a song that was later chosen as the B-side of her lead single from her debut album Presenting Dionne Warwick. In October 1962, Scepter Records released the track as the B-side of her first solo single "I Smiled Yesterday". Initially, Warwick found out that "Make It Easy on Yourself"—the original demo of which she had recorded and had wanted to be her first single release—had been given to another artist, Jerry Butler.

From the contemporary phrase, "Don't make me over", Burt Bacharach and Hal David wrote and produced their first US top 40 pop hit (No. 21) and US R&B hit (No. 5). It was also a top-forty hit in Canada, at number 38. The background vocals in the song were from the Gospelaires, which featured sister Dee Dee, Sylvia Shemwell and aunt Cissy Houston.

In 2000, Dionne Warwick's 1962 version of "Don't Make Me Over" on Scepter Records was inducted into the Grammy Hall of Fame.

=== Track listing ===
- US, 7-inch vinyl single

A1: "Don't Make Me Over" – 2:51
B1: "I Smiled Yesterday" – 2:43

- UK, 7-inch vinyl single

A1: "Don't Make Me Over" – 2:46
A2: "Shall I Tell Her" – 2:33
B1: "Make The Music Play" – 2:25
B2: "Any Old Time Of Day" – 2:25

- France, 7-inch vinyl single

A1: "Don't Make Me Over" – 2:46
A2: "Shall I Tell Her" – 3:20
B1: "I Smiled Yesterday" – 2:44
B2: "Wishin' And Hopin'" – 2:25

=== Charts ===
Chart (1962–1963)	Peak position
Belgium (Ultratip Bubbling Under Wallonia)	–
Canada (CHUM)	38
France (IFOP)	69
US Billboard Hot 100	21
US Hot R&B/Hip-Hop Songs (Billboard)	5
US Cash Box Top 100	17

== Jennifer Warnes version ==
Chart (1979)	Peak position
US Billboard Hot 100	67
US Adult Contemporary (Billboard)	36
US Hot Country Songs (Billboard)	84

== Sybil version ==
"Don't Make Me Over"

Single by Sybil

from the album Let Yourself Go and Sybil
- B-side: "Here Comes My Love"
- Released: July 10, 1989
- Genre: Dance; soul
- Length: 3:54
- Label: Next Plateau Inc.
- Songwriters: Burt Bacharach; Hal David
- Producers: Dolores Drewry; James Bratton

Sybil singles chronology
"Can't Wait (On Tomorrow)" (1988)	"Don't Make Me Over" (1989)	"Walk On By" (1990)

Music video
- "Don't Make Me Over" on YouTube

In 1987, American singer Sybil included a dance cover of the song on her 1987 debut album, Let Yourself Go. At the time, the song was not released as a single in its own right from the album.

However, in July 1989, Next Plateau Records released a remixed version of the song as the second single from Sybil's second album, Sybil (1989). This version reached number 20 on the US Billboard Hot 100, becoming Sybil's highest-charting Hot 100 song in the US, and peaked at number two on the Billboard Hot Black Singles chart. The song received a gold certification from the Recording Industry Association of America (RIAA). This version also peaked at number one in New Zealand for four weeks and became a UK hit, reaching number 19 on the UK Singles Chart.

=== Critical reception ===
Bill Coleman from Billboard magazine described Sybil's cover as a "spirited Soul II Soul-ish rendition of the Dionne Warwick classic [that] has smash written all over it". In a retrospective review, Pop Rescue stated that it has a beat that musically reminds of "a hybrid" of Soul II Soul's "Keep On Movin'" and Take That's "Pray", calling it "mellow and soulful". Miranda Sawyer from Smash Hits noted "the swoony dance wisples" of the song. David Keeps from Spin felt Sybil "seems to be emerging as the Dionne Warwick of the Soul II Soul generation", remarking her "achingly sexy conga-strings-and-coos" version of "Don't Make Me Over".

=== Track listings ===
7-inch single, West Germany (1989)
No.	Title	Length
1.	"Don't Make Me Over" (radio version)	3:54
2.	"Here Comes My Love"	3:58

12-inch single, West Germany (1989)
No.	Title	Length
1.	"Don't Make Me Over" (The KING-dom Come mix)	7:20
2.	"Don't Make Me Over" (radio mix)	3:54
3.	"Here Comes My Love" (vocal)	3:58
4.	"Here Comes My Love" (instrumental)	3:58

CD maxi, West Germany (1989)
No.	Title	Length
1.	"Don't Make Me Over" (Nightime mix)	3:45
2.	"Don't Make Me Over" (Daytime mix)	3:27
3.	"My Love Is Guaranteed" (Red Ink mix part 1)	5:35

CD maxi, France (1989)
No.	Title	Length
1.	"Don't Make Me Over" (The King-Dom Come mix)	7:20
2.	"Don't Make Me Over" (radio mix)	3:54
3.	"Here Comes My Love" (vocal)	3:58
4.	"Don't Make Me Over" (instrumental version)	3:36

=== Charts ===
==== Weekly charts ====
Chart (1989–1990)	Peak position
Australia (ARIA)	144
Canada Top Singles (RPM)	58
Canada Dance/Urban (RPM)	2
Europe (Eurochart Hot 100)	70
Israel (Israeli Singles Chart)	6
Luxembourg (Radio Luxembourg)	19
Netherlands (Dutch Top 40 Tipparade)	11
Netherlands (Single Top 100)	48
New Zealand (Recorded Music NZ)	1
UK Singles (Official Charts)	19
US Billboard Hot 100	20
US 12-inch Singles Sales (Billboard)	2
US Dance Club Play (Billboard)	4
US Hot Black Singles (Billboard)	2
West Germany (GfK)	40

==== Year-end charts ====
Chart (1989)	Position
US 12-inch Singles Sales (Billboard)	10
US Dance Club Play (Billboard)	11
US Hot Black Singles (Billboard)	5

Chart (1990)	Position
New Zealand (RIANZ)	17

=== Certifications ===
Region	Certification	Certified units/sales
United States (RIAA)	Gold	500,000^{^}
^{^} Shipments figures based on certification alone.

=== Release history ===
Region	Date	Format(s)	Label(s)	Ref.
United Kingdom	July 10, 1989	7-inch vinyl; 12-inch vinyl	Champion	
United Kingdom	October 2, 1989	12-inch vinyl; CD (remix)	Champion	
Japan	January 1, 1990	CD	Next Plateau Inc.	
Australia	January 22, 1990	7-inch vinyl; 12-inch vinyl; cassette	Liberation	

== Other versions ==
Various other versions of the song have been recorded:

- In 1964 the English singer Louise Cordet recorded the song which was released on Decca F11875 coupled with "Two Lovers".
- In January 1966, Liverpudlian band the Swinging Blue Jeans released a version which peaked at No. 31 in the United Kingdom and No. 83 in Canada
- Brenda & the Tabulations hit number 15 on the US R&B chart with their version in 1970.
