= When I'm Good and Ready =

1993 single by Sybil

Single by Sybil

from the album Good 'N' Ready
- Released: March 8, 1993
- Genre: Dance-pop; Eurodance
- Length: 3:38
- Label: PWL International; FFRR; Control; Next Plateau Entertainment
- Songwriter: Stock/Waterman
- Producer: Stock/Waterman

Sybil singles chronology
"The Love I Lost" (1993)	"When I'm Good and Ready" (1993)	"Beyond Your Wildest Dreams" (1993)

Music video
- "When I'm Good and Ready" on YouTube

"When I'm Good and Ready" is a song by American R&B and pop singer-songwriter Sybil, released on March 8, 1993, by PWL International and FFRR Records as the first single from her fifth album, Good 'N' Ready (1993). Written and produced by Stock/Waterman, it also features backing vocals by Mae McKenna, Stock and Miriam Stockley. The song became a top-10 hit in the United Kingdom and Ireland, and it entered the top 20 in Austria. In 1997, "When I'm Good and Ready" was re-released in a new remix by UK remix, production and songwriting team Love to Infinity, which achieved a moderate success on the national chart.

== Critical reception ==
=== Initial response ===
In their review of the Good 'N' Ready album, Pan-European magazine Music & Media stated, "Her forte is dance with a poppy and exuberant feel to it". Alan Jones from Music Week described the song as a "typically bright and breezy Stock/Waterman production superbly sung by the American diva [that] has instant, if fairly lighweight [sic], appeal." He added, "This is what you're missing, Kylie." Johnny Dee from NME named Sybil "this year's Rozalla", writing that songs like "When I'm Good and Ready" "are about the same things Sandie and Dusty sang of in the '60s: female independence and chucking boys. This is the sound of River Island changing rooms on a Saturday afternoon". James Hamilton from the Record Mirror Dance Update complimented it as "superb". Another editor, Tim Jeffery, stated, "The test of a cover version artist is whether they can come through with an original follow-up. Sybil has done just that. Even though the production of this pop/garage tune is heading straight at the Top 40 market." Tony Cross from Smash Hits stated, "After "The Love I Lost", Sybil has another song with "hit" written all over it." He also opined that "her powerful vocals are underused in this repetitive soul-sisters dancerama."

On the release of the Love to Infinity remix in 1997, Music Week rated it four out of five, adding, "This was great as an anthemic pop dance number (a top five hit in 1993) and is even better now it's been toughened up with a raunchier, soulful feel."

=== Retrospective reviews ===
In 2017, Christian Guiltenane of British magazine Attitude praised the song as being a "sparkly pop sensation" and a "dancefloor filler", adding that "Sybil's impressive soul vocals give this a much needed boost of gravitas".

=== Impact and legacy ===
In 2023, Alexis Petridis of The Guardian listed the song at number 19 in his "Stock Aitken Waterman's 20 greatest songs – ranked!", adding: "Pop house meets bubblegum soul, the old SAW sound given a sleek upgrade for a new era: less obviously tinny, a little more luxurious".

== Chart performance ==
In UK, "When I'm Good and Ready" debuted at number 22 on the chart edition ending March 20, 1993, reached number five three weeks later, a position it held for three consecutive weeks, and fell off the chart after 13 weeks. On the UK year-end chart for 1993, it ranked at number 40, and was a top-ten hit in UK clubs. It was also a top-ten hit in Ireland, peaking at number six, with eight weeks of charting. In other European territories, the single was less successful, rising to number 17 in Austria, and barely made the top 50 in Germany where it culminated at number 46 and charted for ten weeks. On the Pan-European Hot 100 Singles chart compiled by Music & Media, it peaked at number 21 in its sixth week, in May 1993. Outside Europe, it became a top-30 hit in Israel, peaking at number 27, and stalled under the top 200 in Australia. In 1997, a remixed version charted in UK, reaching number 66.

== Track listings ==
- 7-inch single, UK (1993)

A. "When I'm Good and Ready" – 3:38
B. "When I'm Good and Ready" (Good N' Buzzin' edit) – 3:38

- 12-inch, UK (1993)

A. "When I'm Good and Ready" (Jewel & Stone mix) – 10:00
B1. "When I'm Good and Ready" (7-inch version) – 3:38
B2. "When I'm Good and Ready" (12-inch club mix) – 5:15

- CD single, UK (1993)
1. "When I'm Good and Ready" (7-inch version) – 3:38
2. "When I'm Good and Ready" (Jewels & Stone mix) – 10:00
3. "When I'm Good and Ready" (Classic Dub mix) – 5:38
4. "When I'm Good and Ready" (The Woman's Prerogative mix) – 7:00
5. "When I'm Good and Ready" (12-inch club mix) – 5:15
6. "When I'm Good and Ready" (Good N' Buzzin' mix) – 5:28

- CD mini single, Japan (1993)
1. "When I'm Good and Ready" (7-inch Edit) – 3:35
2. "When I'm Good and Ready" (Good 'N' Buzzin' edit) – 3:39
- Cassette single, UK (1993)
1. "When I'm Good and Ready" – 3:38
2. "When I'm Good and Ready" (Good N' Buzzin' Edit) – 3:38
- CD maxi, Europe (1997)
1. "When I'm Good and Ready" (Stratoradio mix) – 3:50
2. "When I'm Good and Ready" (Stratomaster mix) – 7:22
3. "When I'm Good and Ready" (Telescopic Jippy dub) – 7:21
4. "When I'm Good and Ready" (original version) – 3:33

== Charts ==
=== Weekly charts ===
1993 weekly chart performance for "When I'm Good and Ready"
Chart (1993)	Peak position
Australia (ARIA)	213
Austria (Ö3 Austria Top 40)	17
Europe (Eurochart Hot 100)	21
Europe (European Dance Radio)	7
Germany (GfK)	46
Ireland (IRMA)	6
Israel (Israeli Singles Chart)	27
UK Singles (Official Charts)	5
UK Airplay (Music Week)	1
UK Dance (Music Week)	8
UK Club Chart (Music Week)	2

1997 weekly chart performance for "When I'm Good and Ready"
Chart (1997)	Peak position
Scotland (OCC)	92
UK Singles (OCC)	66

=== Year-end charts ===
Year-end chart performance for "When I'm Good and Ready"
Chart (1993)	Position
UK Singles (OCC)	40
UK Airplay (Music Week)	27
UK Club Chart (Music Week)	12

== Release history ==
Release dates and formats for "When I'm Good and Ready"
Region	Date	Format(s)	Label(s)	Ref.
United Kingdom	March 8, 1993	7-inch vinyl; 12-inch vinyl; CD; cassette	PWL International; FFRR	
Australia	August 16, 1993	CD; cassette	FFRR; Polydor	
Japan	September 26, 1993	Mini-CD	London	
