= New Attitude (album) =

Studio album by Young Divas
- Released: 24 November 2007
- Recorded: 2007
- Genres: Dance, pop, R&B
- Length: 37:22
- Label: Sony BMG

Young Divas chronology
Young Divas (2006)	New Attitude (2007)

Singles from New Attitude
- 1. "Turn Me Loose" Released: 17 November 2007

New Attitude is the second and final studio album by Australian girl group Young Divas, released on 24 November 2007 by Sony BMG. It is the first album to feature vocals by Jessica Mauboy, who replaced Ricki-Lee Coulter after she left the group to resume her solo career. Much like their debut album, New Attitude features more covers. The album debuted at number 10 on the ARIA Albums Chart and was certified gold by the Australian Recording Industry Association (ARIA), for shipments of 35,000 copies.

A cover of Loverboy's "Turn Me Loose", which featured New Zealand rapper Savage, was released as the only single from the album, and peaked at number 15 on the ARIA Singles Chart.

== Track listing ==
No.	Title	Writer(s)	Original artist	Length
1.	"Got to Be Real"	David Foster, David Paich, Cheryl Lynn	Cheryl Lynn	3:48
2.	"If I Can't Have You"	Barry Gibb, Maurice Gibb, Robin Gibb	Bee Gees	3:27
3.	"Turn Me Loose" (featuring Savage)	Paul Dean, Mike Reno	Loverboy	3:48
4.	"New Attitude"	Jon Gilutin, Bunny Hull, Sharon Robinson	Patti LaBelle	3:42
5.	"Jump (For My Love)"	Stephen Mitchell, Marti Sharron, Gary Skardina	The Pointer Sisters	3:43
6.	"Love Will Lead You Back"	Diane Warren	Taylor Dayne	3:56
7.	"Chain Reaction"	B. Gibb, R. Gibb, M. Gibb	Diana Ross	3:30
8.	"I Can't Wait"	Stevie Nicks, Rick Nowels, Eric Pressly	Stevie Nicks	4:03
9.	"I'm So Excited"	Anita Pointer, June Pointer, Ruth Pointer, Trevor Lawrence	The Pointer Sisters	3:42
10.	"Tell It to My Heart"	Seth Swirsky, Ernie Gold	Taylor Dayne	3:49
11.	"Dear Santa (Bring Me a Man This Christmas)"	Paul Jabara, Eric Shaffer	The Weather Girls	3:41

iTunes bonus track
No.	Title	Writer(s)	Original artist	Length
12.	"I Wanna Dance with Somebody (Who Loves Me)"	George Merrill, Shannon Rubicam	Whitney Houston	3:55

== Charts and certifications ==
=== Weekly chart ===
Chart (2007)	Peak position
Australian Albums (ARIA)	10

=== Year-end charts ===
Chart (2007)	Rank
Australian Albums (ARIA)	93

=== Certification ===
Country	Certification
Australia (ARIA)	Gold

== Release history ==
Country	Date	Format	Label
Australia	24 November 2007	CD, digital download	Sony BMG
