= Happenin' All Over Again =

1990 single by Lonnie Gordon

Single by Lonnie Gordon

from the album If I Have to Stand Alone and Bad Mood
- Released: January 15, 1990
- Genre: Pop-disco; dance-pop
- Length: 3:21
- Label: Supreme (1990); SBK (1993)
- Songwriters: Matt Aitken; Mike Stock; Pete Waterman
- Producer: Stock Aitken Waterman

Lonnie Gordon singles chronology
"It's Not Over (Let No Man Put Asunder)" (1989)	"Happenin' All Over Again" (1990)	"Beyond Your Wildest Dreams" (1990)

Alternative cover
- 1993 remix single cover

Alternative cover
- 1998 single cover

Music video
- "Happenin' All Over Again" on YouTube

"Happenin' All Over Again" is a song written and produced by Stock Aitken & Waterman (SAW) for American singer Lonnie Gordon's first album, If I Have to Stand Alone (1990). The song mixed SAW's sound with the blooming Italo house music that was becoming big in the UK charts at the time. It was released as the album's second single on January 15, 1990, and reached number four on the UK Singles Chart. A different version of the song was included on Gordon's 1993 album Bad Mood, and this version was released as a North American single in 1993, peaking at number 98 on the Billboard Hot 100 and at number one on the Billboard Dance Club Play chart. In 1998, Gordon recorded the song for a second time and released it as a single.

== Background and writing ==
The background of the song — specifically, who it was originally written for — has long been a source of rumour and dispute. According to Gordon, it had been originally written for Donna Summer, but due to a falling-out with the producers, she never recorded it, and instead it was given to Gordon. Fellow SAW artist Hazell Dean has suggested she was once in the running to be assigned the track. The Donna Summer story has been denied by composer Mike Stock, and Supreme Records label chief, Nick East, who both insist it was an original composition written specifically for Gordon. The SAW version was mixed by Phil Harding, who emphasised the hip house and Italo house elements.

== Critical reception ==
=== Initial response ===
Larry Flick from Billboard complimented the song, noting that Gordon's "fierce, sweet'n'sour performance is diva-supreme." David Giles from Music Week called it an "outstanding pop/disco record", adding that "it betrays a healthy obsession with Seventies dance music right down to the very "showbizzy" chord changes." The magazine also said it's "one of the year's finest songs" and put it at number 6 in their Top 10 list, "Pick of the Year – Mainstream Singles". William Shaw from Smash Hits wrote that "it's one of those unstoppable thumping rhythms with a gloriously loud tune belted out over the top by the formidable Ms Gordon", adding that "this is the absolute stuff." Iestyn George of Record Mirror considered the song's title funny as it was a SAW production, but added that "this is an above average disco/pop romp reminiscent of Donna Summer's recent stuff", which refers to the album Another Place and Time.

=== Impact and legacy ===
In 2014, Matt Dunn of WhatCulture ranked the song at number 6 in his "15 unforgettable Stock Aitken Waterman singles" list, stating that "its sound was edgier and more contemporary than most PWL output of the era". In 2021, British magazine Classic Pop ranked it number 22 in their list of "Top 40 Stock Aitken Waterman songs". They wrote, "On a song originally intended for Donna Summer, phasing arpeggios were the order of the day in the PWL studio for "Happenin' All Over Again", soon to become the sophomore single from Lonnie Gordon's debut album If I Have to Stand Alone. Mixed by Phil Harding, those Italo house influences are evident amongst the Euro dance-pop aura, leading to a well-earned Top 5 UK hit. Later on, in 1998, Coronation Street's Tracy Shaw had a crack at it and clawed her way to No.46 (best forgotten)." In 2023, Alexis Petridis of The Guardian listed the song at number 14 in his "Stock Aitken Waterman's 20 greatest songs – ranked!", adding that it proves that "Waterman had cut his teeth as a DJ in the 70s when the sound of northern soul seeped into SAW's productions".

== Chart performance ==
Worldwide, "Happenin' All Over Again" became by far Gordon's most successful single. In the UK, the original version started at number 32 on January 27, 1990, then climbed to number nine, peaked at number four twice, and stayed on the chart for ten weeks; similarly, it made the top-three and charted for six weeks in Ireland, which was the song's highest placement for the 1990 version. It also peaked inside the top-ten in Finland and the top-20 in Sweden, reaching number eight and 14, respectively, was a top-25 hit in France and the Flanders part of Belgium, and a top-40 hit in the Netherlands where it stalled at number 34. In addition, it attained number 44 in Germany, spending four weeks in the top-50 out of a ten-week chart run. On the Pan-European Hot 100 Singles chart compiled by Music & Media, it entered at number 77 on February 3, 1990, reached a peak of number nine two weeks later, a position it held for consecutive two weeks, and appeared on the chart for a total of 12 weeks divided into two segments with a 14-week hiatus due to its release in June 1990 in France. It also charted for seven weeks on the European Airplay Top 50, with a peak at number eight in its penultimate week. Outside Europe, it stalled under the top 30 in Australia and New Zealand where it reached number 33 and 43, respectively.

Unlike the original version which was not released in North America, the remixed version included on Gordon's second album Bad Mood charted three years later in the US, peaking at number 98 for two weeks on the Billboard Hot 100 in November 1993. It was the singer's third and last single, after "Gonna Catch You" and "Bad Mood", to top the US Dance Club Play, a position it reached in its eighth week out of a 13-week chart run.

== Music video ==
A music video was produced to promote the single. It shows Gordon performing a choreographed dance and other shots display Gordon singing under an umbrella.

== Track listings ==
- CD single
1. "Happenin' All Over Again" (hip house mix)
2. "Happenin' All Over Again" (Italiano house mix)
3. "Happenin' All Over Again" (senza voce)
- CD single (Belgium)
1. "Happenin' All Over Again" (hip house radio mix) – 3:20
2. "Happenin' All Over Again" (hip house mix) – 5:36
3. "Happenin' All Over Again" (Italiano house mix) – 6:45
4. "Right Before My Eyes" (The blind house mix) – 6:12
- 12-inch single
1. "Happenin' All Over Again" (hip house mix)
2. "Happenin' All Over Again" (Italiano house mix)
3. "Right Before My Eyes" (The blind house mix)
- 7-inch single
1. "Happenin' All Over Again" (hip house radio mix) – 3:20
2. "Happenin' All Over Again" (senza voce) – 3:36
- CD single (1993 US remix)
1. "Happenin' All Over Again" (LP version) 3:30
2. "Happenin' All Over Again" (Tony king's hip hop mix) 5:30
3. "Happenin' All Over Again" (Jewels & stone club mix) 6:20
4. "Happenin' All Over Again" (Jumpin' johnny jay's r&b mix) 5:22
5. "Happenin' All Over Again" (Pwl's original mix – extended version) 5:55

== Charts ==
=== Original version ===
==== Weekly charts ====
1990 weekly chart performance for "Happenin' All Over Again"
Chart (1990)	Peak position
Australia (ARIA)	33
Belgium (Ultratop 50 Flanders)	25
Europe (Eurochart Hot 100)	9
Europe (European Airplay Top 50)	8
Finland (Suomen virallinen lista)	8
France (SNEP)	24
Ireland (IRMA)	3
Israel (Israeli Singles Chart)	2
Luxembourg (Radio Luxembourg)	2
Netherlands (Dutch Top 40)	34
Netherlands (Single Top 100)	35
New Zealand (Recorded Music NZ)	43
Sweden (Sverigetopplistan)	14
UK Singles (Official Charts)	4
UK Dance (Music Week)	5
West Germany (GfK)	44

==== Year-end charts ====
1990 year-end chart performance for "Happenin' All Over Again"
Chart (1990)	Position
Sweden (Topplistan)	74

=== 1993 remix ===
==== Weekly charts ====
1993–1994 weekly chart performance for "Happenin' All Over Again"
Chart (1993–1994)	Peak position
Canada Dance/Urban (RPM)	8
Quebec (ADISQ)	18
US Billboard Hot 100	98
US Dance Club Play (Billboard)	1
US Maxi-Singles Sales (Billboard)	31

==== Year-end charts ====
1993 year-end chart performance for "Happenin' All Over Again"
Chart (1993)	Position
US Dance Club Play (Billboard)	42

== Release history ==
Region	Date	Format(s)	Label(s)	Ref.
United Kingdom	January 15, 1990	7-inch vinyl; 12-inch vinyl	Supreme	
Australia	April 30, 1990	7-inch vinyl; 12-inch vinyl; cassette	Supreme; Liberation	
Japan	May 25, 1990	Mini-CD	Supreme; Alfa	

== Young Divas version ==
"Happenin' All Over Again"

Single by Young Divas

from the album Young Divas
- Released: November 11, 2006
- Length: 3:28
- Label: Sony BMG
- Songwriters: Matt Aitken, Mike Stock, Pete Waterman
- Producers: George Papapetros, Max Kourilov

Young Divas singles chronology
"This Time I Know It's for Real" (2006)	"Happenin' All Over Again" (2006)	"Searchin'" (2007)

Audio video
- "Happenin' All Over Again" on YouTube

Australian girl group Young Divas covered "Happenin' All Over Again" for their self-titled debut album Young Divas. It was produced by George Papapetros and Max Kourilov, and released as the second single from the album on November 11, 2006. The song peaked at number nine on the ARIA Singles Chart and was certified gold by the Australian Recording Industry Association (ARIA), for shipments of 35,000 copies. The music video for "Happenin' All Over Again" features the Young Divas singing and dancing in front of a white backdrop.

=== Track listing ===
CD single

1. "Happenin' All Over Again"
2. "Happenin' All Over Again" (Extended Remix)
3. "This Time I Know It's for Real" (Music Video)

=== Credits and personnel ===
- Songwriting – Matt Aitken, Mike Stock, Pete Waterman
- Production – George Papapetros, Max Kourilov
- Mixing – George Papapetros, Max Kourilov
- Mastering – Tom Coyne

=== Charts ===
==== Weekly chart ====
Chart (2006)	Peak position
Australia (ARIA)	9

==== Year-end charts ====
Chart (2006)	Rank
Australia (ARIA)	72
Australian Artists (ARIA)	21

=== Certifications ===
Region	Certification	Certified units/sales
Australia (ARIA)	Gold	35,000^{^}
^{^} Shipments figures based on certification alone.

== Other covers ==
In mid-1998, former Coronation Street star Tracy Shaw released a cover version of "Happenin' All Over Again" that reached number 46 on the UK Singles Chart. Her character Maxine Heavey also sang it in the Coronation Street special "Viva Las Vegas".
