= Walk On By =

1964 single by Dionne Warwick

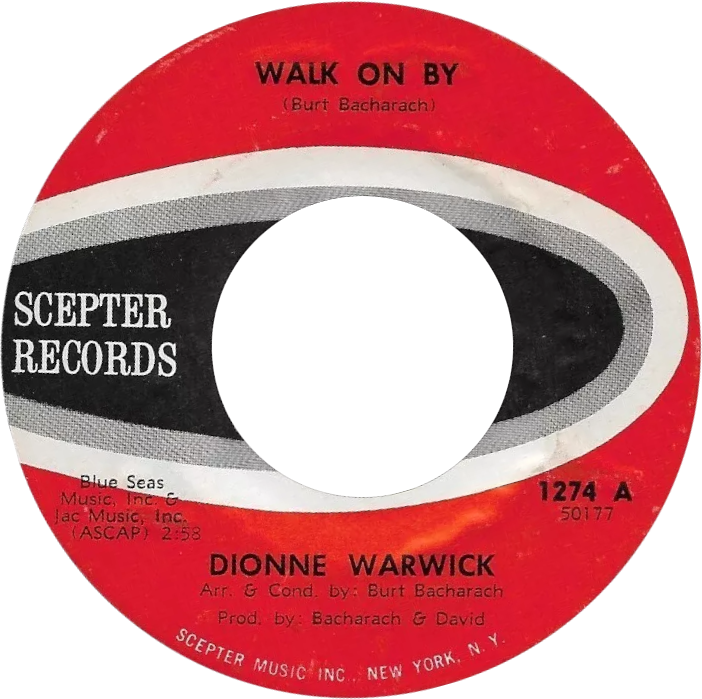
- One of side-A labels of the US single

Single by Dionne Warwick

from the album Make Way for Dionne Warwick
- B-side: "Any Old Time of Day"
- Released: April 26, 1964
- Recorded: November to December 1963
- Studio: Bell Sound, New York City
- Genre: Pop; R&B; soul; lounge; bossa nova
- Length: 2:55
- Label: Scepter
- Composer: Burt Bacharach
- Lyricist: Hal David
- Producers: Burt Bacharach; Hal David

Dionne Warwick singles chronology
"Anyone Who Had a Heart" (1963)	"Walk On By" (1964)	"You'll Never Get to Heaven (If You Break My Heart)" (1964)

Official audio
- "Walk On By" on YouTube

"Walk On By" is a song written by Burt Bacharach and Hal David for singer Dionne Warwick in 1963. Warwick's recording of the song peaked at number six on the US Billboard Hot 100 and number one on the Cash Box Rhythm and Blues Chart In June 1964 and was nominated for a 1965 Grammy Award for the Best Rhythm and Blues Recording.

Isaac Hayes recorded the song five years later, in 1969, and his version reached number 30 on the Hot 100 chart and number 13 in the R&B charts. "Walk On By" has since charted numerous times in various countries, with wildly different arrangements.

In 1998, the 1964 release by Dionne Warwick on Scepter Records was inducted into the Grammy Hall of Fame.

== Dionne Warwick original version (1964) ==
The original version of "Walk On By" by Dionne Warwick was recorded at Bell Sound Studios in New York City, the same late November/early December 1963 session that yielded her hit "Anyone Who Had a Heart". "Walk On By" was the follow-up to that single, released in April 1964 and reaching number 6 on the U.S. Billboard Hot 100 and number 1 on the Cashbox's R&B chart. (Billboard did not print rhythm and blues charts during 1964, the year of the song's peak performance.) The song also reached the top 10 in a run on Billboard's easy listening survey. The song was ranked number 51 on the Rolling Stone list of The 500 Greatest Songs of All Time. "Walk On By" became Warwick's second international million seller, following "Anyone Who Had A Heart" in January 1964. Warwick also recorded a German version of the song, titled "Geh vorbei".

Session drummer Gary Chester played on this recording as did session bassist Russ Savakus. Other musicians included Artie Butler on organ, Paul Griffin on piano, Irwin Markowitz and Ernie Royal on trumpet, Bill Suyker and Allen Hanlon on guitar, Max Pollikoff, Charles McCracken, Eugene Orloff, Julius Held, and George Ockner on violin, Harold Coletta on viola, Lucien Schmit on cello, Paul Winter on saxophone, and George Devens on percussion.

In 2023, Warwick's recording was sampled by Doja Cat for her single "Paint the Town Red". It reached number one on the Hot 100 on the issue dated September 16, 2023, marking the first time Warwick's voice appeared at number one since "That's What Friends Are For" in 1986.

=== Charts ===
==== Weekly charts ====
Chart (1964)	Peak position
Australia	28
Canada	14
New Zealand (Lever Hit Parade)	4
UK Singles (OCC)	9
US Billboard Hot 100	6
US Adult Contemporary (Billboard)	7
US Cash Box R&B	1

==== Year-end charts ====
Chart (1964)	Peak position
US Billboard Hot 100	37

=== Certifications ===
Region	Certification	Certified units/sales
United Kingdom (BPI) Sales since November 14, 2004	Silver	200,000^{‡}
^{‡} Sales+streaming figures based on certification alone.

== Bobby Kris and the Imperials version (1965) ==
The Toronto folk-rock group Bobby Kris and the Imperials released a fairly straight-ahead cover version in late 1965. The single became a major hit in Canada, reaching number 8 in early 1966, but "Walk On By" was the band's only hit.

=== Charts ===
Chart (1966)	Peak position
Canada Singles (RPM 100)	8

== Isaac Hayes version (1969) ==
"Walk On By"

Single by Isaac Hayes

from the album Hot Buttered Soul
- B-side: "By the Time I Get to Phoenix"
- Released: July 1969
- Recorded: 1969
- Genre: Progressive soul; deep funk; psychedelic soul
- Length: 12:00 (album version); 4:34 (single version)
- Label: Enterprise
- Songwriters: Burt Bacharach; Hal David
- Producers: Al Bell; Marvell Thomas; Allen Jones

Isaac Hayes singles chronology
"Precious, Precious" (1967)	"Walk On By" (1969)	"The Mistletoe and Me" (1969)

Official audio
- "Walk On By" on YouTube

Isaac Hayes released a cover version of "Walk On By" in 1969 on the album Hot Buttered Soul, transforming the song into a 12-minute funk vamp. A single edit reached number 30 on the U.S. Billboard Hot 100 chart. Hayes's version was ranked No. 312 in the 2021 edition of Rolling Stone's "Top 500 Songs of All Time".

=== Samples ===
Hayes's version was sampled in 1992 by Compton's Most Wanted in "Hood Took Me Under"; in 1994, by The Notorious B.I.G. in "Warning"; in 1995, by Faith Evans in "No Other Love", from the album Faith; 2Pac in "Me Against The World", in 1998 by McGruff in "Harlem Kidz Get Biz"; in 1999, by MF Doom in "Dead Bent"; in 2000, by Wu-Tang Clan in "I Can't Go to Sleep"; in 1996, by Hooverphonic in "2 Wicky"; in 2005, by Hip Hop Pantsula in "Let Me Be", from his album YBA 2 NW; and in 2016 in Beyoncé's "6 Inch".

== Gloria Gaynor version (1975) ==
"Walk On By"

Single by Gloria Gaynor

from the album Experience Gloria Gaynor
- B-side: "Real Good People"
- Released: 1975
- Recorded: 1975
- Length: 3:00
- Label: MGM
- Songwriters: Burt Bacharach; Hal David
- Producer: Meco Monardo

Gloria Gaynor singles chronology
"Reach Out, I'll Be There" (1975)	"Walk On By" (1975)	"All I Need Is Your Sweet Lovin'" (1975)

Official video
- "Walk On By" on YouTube

American singer Gloria Gaynor released her disco version on her 1975 album, Experience Gloria Gaynor. It became a hit in South Africa during the fall of the year, where it reached number 12, and number 17 in West Germany.

=== Charts ===
Chart (1975)	Peak position
Austria (Ö3 Austria Top 40)	12
Belgium (Ultratop Flanders)	14
Belgium (Ultratop Wallonia)	29
Canada	90
Netherlands (Dutch Top 40)	22
Netherlands (Single Top 100)	19
South Africa (Springbok)	12
US Billboard Hot 100	98
West Germany (Official German Charts)	17

== The Stranglers version (1978) ==
"Walk On By"

Single by the Stranglers
- B-side: "Old Codger", "Tank"
- Released: July 1978
- Genre: Post-punk; new wave; neo-psychedelia
- Length: 6:22
- Label: United Artists
- Songwriters: Burt Bacharach; Hal David
- Producer: Martin Rushent

The Stranglers singles chronology
"Nice 'n' Sleazy" (1978)	"Walk On By" (1978)	"Duchess" (1979)

Official audio
- "Walk On By" on YouTube

In 1978, the Stranglers recorded a version of "Walk on By" which reached No. 21 on the UK singles chart. This six-minute version of the song features extended Hammond organ and guitar solos which Gene Becker of AllMusic likened to the Doors' "Light My Fire". A music video was produced for the single, parodying Michelangelo Antonioni's 1966 film Blowup. As with key sequences of the film, the Stranglers video was filmed largely in London's Maryon Park. The single's chart performance may have been impaired by the fact that an EP featuring the song had been given away with the first 75,000 copies of the band's album Black and White.

=== Charts ===
Chart (1978)	Peak position
UK Singles (OCC)	21

== Average White Band version (1979) ==
The Average White Band cut a lightly disco-tinged version (featuring reggae and funk underpinnings) that charted in 1979.

=== Charts ===
Chart (1979)	Peak position
UK Singles (OCC)	46
US Billboard Hot 100	92

== D-Train version (1982) ==
In 1982, "Walk On By" was covered by the funk duo D Train who had a UK and US R&B/dance hit with the song in a boogie/funk version.

=== Charts ===
Chart (1982)	Peak position
UK Singles (OCC)	44
US Hot R&B Songs (Billboard)	42
US Hot Dance Club Play (Billboard)	45

== Jo Jo Zep version (1983) ==
In 1983, Australian group Jo Jo Zep covered "Walk On By" in a slow, moody version that featured electronics and synthesisers. The song was lifted from the band's seventh studio album, Cha. The track was a minor hit in Australia, peaking at number 55, but was a major hit in New Zealand, hitting number six.

=== Charts ===
Chart (1983)	Peak position
Australia	55
New Zealand	6

== Melissa Manchester version (1989) ==
In 1989, "Walk On By" was covered by singer Melissa Manchester. Her version of the song hit number six on the US Billboard Adult Contemporary chart.

=== Charts ===
Chart (1989)	Peak position
US Adult Contemporary (Billboard)	6

== Sybil version (1990) ==
"Walk On By"

Single by Sybil

from the album Sybil
- Released: 1990
- Genre: Dance-pop; R&B
- Length: 4:04
- Label: PWL Records
- Songwriters: Burt Bacharach; Hal David
- Producer: Eddie O'Loughlin

Sybil singles chronology
"Don't Make Me Over" (1989)	"Walk On By" (1990)	"Make It Easy on Me" (1990)

Music video
- "Walk On By" on YouTube

In 1990, American singer Sybil, who had scored her biggest hit a year prior with a cover of Warwick's "Don't Make Me Over", also scored a UK hit with "Walk On By". It was produced by Eddie O'Loughlin and released by PWL Records, as the third single from her second album, Sybil (1989).

=== Track listing ===
- US, 7" Vinyl single

A1: "Walk On By" (Club Mix) – 7:15
A2: "Walk On By" (Radio) – 4:04
B1: "Here Comes My Love" (Vocal Mix) – 3:48
B2: "Here Comes My Love" (Instrumental) – 3:58

- UK, CD Maxi single
1. "Walk On By" (Club Mix) – 7:15
2. "Bad Beats Suite" (Radio) – 3:12
3. "Walk On By" (Dub Version) – 3:21

=== Charts ===
==== Weekly charts ====
Chart (1990)	Peak position
Belgium (Ultratop Flanders)	35
Europe (Eurochart Hot 100)	18
Luxembourg (Radio Luxembourg)	4
Netherlands (Dutch Top 40)	14
Netherlands (Single Top 100)	15
New Zealand (RIANZ)	2
UK Singles (OCC)	6
US Billboard Hot 100	74
US Hot R&B Songs (Billboard)	3
US Hot Dance Club Play (Billboard)	3
US Cash Box Top 100	68

==== Year-end charts ====
Chart (1990)	Position
New Zealand (RIANZ)	48

== Gabrielle version (1997) ==
"Walk On By"

Single by Gabrielle

from the album Gabrielle
- B-side: "Something to Talk About"
- Released: January 20, 1997
- Length: 3:21
- Label: Go Beat; Universal
- Songwriters: Burt Bacharach; Hal David
- Producer: The Boilerhouse Boys

Gabrielle singles chronology
"If You Ever" (1996)	"Walk On By" (1997)	"Sunshine" (1999)

Official video
- "Walk On By" on YouTube

In 1997, UK singer Gabrielle released her version of "Walk On By" as the fifth and final single from her studio album, Gabrielle. It reached number seven on the UK singles chart.

A reviewer from Music Week rated the track five out of five, adding that the song "is given a fine treatment by Gabrielle, whose voice fits perfectly. A guaranteed radio biggie, too."

=== Track listings ===
UK CD (GODCD 159)
No.	Title	Length
1.	"Walk On By"	3:21
2.	"Walk On By" (45% Novocaine Remix)	3:41
3.	"Walk On By" (Live from TFI Friday)	3:32
4.	"Something To Talk About"	4:13

UK 12-inch vinyl (GODX 159)
No.	Title	Length
1.	"Walk On By"	3:21
2.	"Give Me A Little More Time" (Def Mix)	7:57
3.	"Walk On By" (45% Novocaine Remix)	3:41
4.	"Forget About The World" (Daft Punk 'Don't Forget The World' Mix)	5:44

UK cassette single (GODMC 159)
No.	Title	Length
1.	"Walk On By"	3:21
2.	"Something To Talk About"	4:13

=== Charts ===
Chart (1997)	Peak position
Europe (Eurochart Hot 100)	41
Iceland (Íslenski Listinn Topp 40)	19
Israel (Israeli Singles Chart)	22
Netherlands (Single Top 100)	96
Scotland (OCC)	12
UK Singles (OCC)	7
UK R&B (OCC)	2

== Cyndi Lauper version (2003) ==
"Walk On By" was the first single from Cyndi Lauper's 2003 covers album At Last. It was also included on Lauper's 2004 DVD Live at Last. It was released as a promo only. Remixes of the song reached number 10 on the U.S. dance chart.

=== Formats and track listings ===
US Promotional 12"

1. "Walk On By" (S.A.F.'s Walk to the Dance Floor Club Mix) – 8:12
2. "Walk On By" (S.A.F.'s Walk to the Dance Floor Dub Mix) – 8:12

US Promotional 12" (Remix)

1. "Walk On By" (Eddie X Club Mix) – 10:53
2. "Walk On By" (Eddie X Dub Mix) – 7:52

US Promotional CD

1. "Walk On By" (Live Version) – 3:26
2. "Walk On By" (Album Version) – 4:31
3. "Walk On By" (Tony Moran Mix) – 4:31

=== Charts ===
Chart (2004)	Peak position
US Hot Dance Club Play (Billboard)	10

== Seal version (2004) ==
Seal released a version of "Walk On By" as a single in 2004. Though the song did not chart in his native UK, it made the lower reaches of the charts in several European countries.

=== Charts ===
Chart performance for "Walk On By" by Seal
Chart (2004–2005)	Peak position
Australia (ARIA)	94
Australian Urban (ARIA)	22
Austria (Ö3 Austria Top 40)	57
Belgium (Ultratip Bubbling Under Flanders)	8
Belgium (Ultratip Bubbling Under Wallonia)	2
Germany (GfK)	49
Italy (FIMI)	27
Switzerland (Schweizer Hitparade)	46
