= Gonna Catch You =

Single by Lonnie Gordon

from the album Bad Mood and Cool as Ice soundtrack
- B-side: "Remix"
- Released: 1991
- Recorded: 1991
- Genre: Dance-pop; house
- Length: 3:45
- Label: Supreme Records; SBK Records
- Songwriters: Mirko Limoni; Daniele Davoli; Valerio Semplici
- Producer: Black Box

Lonnie Gordon singles chronology
"If I Have to Stand Alone" (1990)	"Gonna Catch You" (1991)	"Bad Mood" (1993)

Music video
- "Gonna Catch You" on YouTube

"Gonna Catch You" is a song by American Hi-NRG singer Lonnie Gordon, written and produced by Italian group Black Box. First released around Europe in April 1991, it became the singer's second top 40 hit in the UK. It would also be Gordon's last release with her UK label, Supreme Records, which folded soon after. Months later, the single was featured in the 1991 film Cool as Ice. SBK Records signed Gordon and released the single in the US, making it her debut solo single in her homeland. It became the first of three number one dance singles in a row for Gordon in the US. The single also made the Billboard Hot 100, peaking at #79, and was Gordon's only hit on the soul singles chart peaking at #30.

== Critical reception ==
Larry Flick from Billboard magazine wrote that "this pop/house slammer, which was written and produced by the Black Box posse, is a fine intro to radio programmers here. Gordon delivers a swaggering, finger-snappin' vocal that should easily broaden her growing legion of fans." Pan-European magazine Music & Media commented, "The chorus is so catchy, that the title must come true. The saxophones give the pop/dance song a very energetic feel. A feast for dance programmers." James Hamilton from Record Mirror described it as a "maddeningly catchy joyous romping beefy brassy bounder, naggingly driven by an I'm gonna catch yah, baby! Bay-be! Bay-be chorus". He concluded, "Huge!" Miranda Sawyer from Smash Hits compared the song to Jo Boxers, adding, "The record's all the better for the 'Boxer Beat' or whatever it is and, indeed, is a work of cheesy genius that has you bouncing gloriously for about one and a half minute till it severely starts getting on your wick."

== Track listings ==
- CD single, 7-inch single
1. "Gonna Catch You" (Radio Mix) — 3:40
2. "Gonna Catch You" (A cappella/Sax Mix) — 3:00
- 12-inch vinyl

A1. "Gonna Catch You" (Uno Mix)
AA1. "Gonna Catch You" (Acapella / Sax Mix)
AA2. "Gonna Catch You" (Senza Voce)

- CD single
1. "Gonna Catch You" (Radio Mix) — 3:44
2. "Gonna Catch You" (Uno Mix) — 5:44
3. "Gonna Catch You" (Acappella/Sax Mix) — 3:06
4. "Gonna Catch You" (Senza Voce) — 5:19
- Catch You Baby 2009 Remixes
1. "Catch You Baby" (Wideboys Radio Mix) — 3:03
2. "Catch You Baby" (Wideboys Club Mix) — 5:58
3. "Catch You Baby" (Wideboys Electro Remix) — 6:54
4. "Catch You Baby" (7th Heaven Radio Mix) — 3:23
5. "Catch You Baby" (7th Heaven Club Mix) — 6:57
6. "Catch You Baby" (Pete Hammond Remix) — 6:50
7. "Catch You Baby" (Steve Pitron & Max Sanna Radio Edit) — 3:01
8. "Catch You Baby" (Steve Pitron & Max Sanna Remix) — 6:48
9. "Catch You Baby" (Steve Pitron & Max Sanna Dub) — 6:48
10. "Catch You Baby" (R1 Remix) — 5:38

== Charts ==
Weekly chart performance for "Gonna Catch You"
Chart (1991)	Peak position
Australia (ARIA)	145
Europe (Eurochart Hot 100)	84
France (SNEP)	37
Italy (Musica e dischi)	6
Netherlands (Dutch Top 40)	29
Netherlands (Single Top 100)	27
Quebec (ADISQ)	34
UK Singles (OCC)	32
UK Airplay (Music Week)	21
UK Dance (Music Week)	10
UK Club Chart (Record Mirror)	12
US Billboard Hot 100	79
US Hot Black Singles (Billboard)	30
US Hot Dance Club Play (Billboard)	1
