= The Love I Lost =

1973 single by Harold Melvin & the Blue Notes

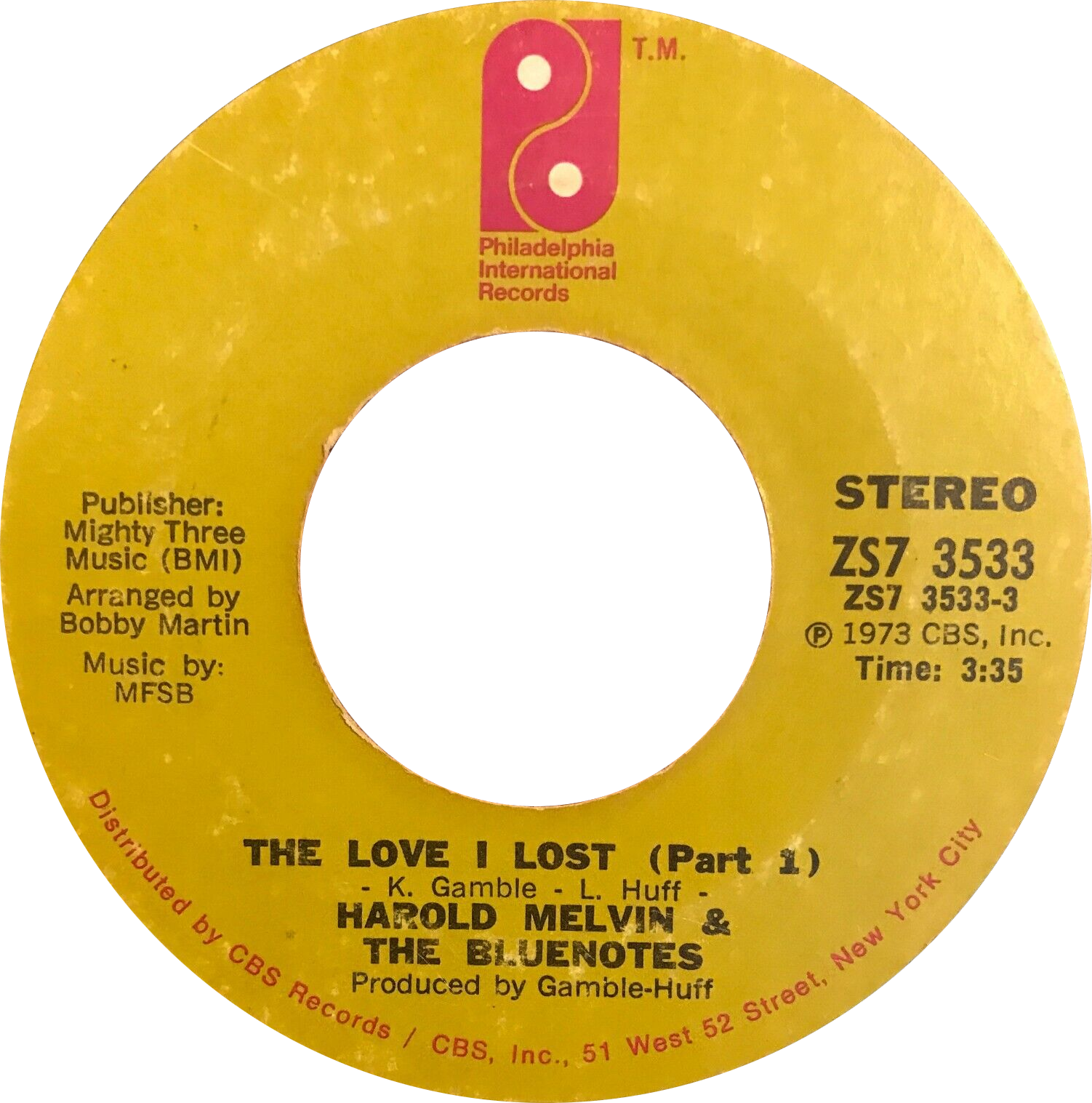
- A-side label of the US single

Single by Harold Melvin & the Blue Notes

from the album Black & Blue
- B-side: "The Love I Lost" (Part 2)
- Released: September 1973
- Studio: Sigma Sound, Philadelphia, Pennsylvania
- Genre: Philadelphia soul; proto-disco
- Length: 3:35 (single version); 6:24 (full-length version)
- Label: Philadelphia International
- Songwriter: Kenny Gamble & Leon Huff
- Producers: Kenny Gamble & Leon Huff

Harold Melvin & the Blue Notes singles chronology
"Yesterday I Had the Blues" (1973)	"The Love I Lost" (1973)	"Satisfaction Guaranteed (Or Take Your Love Back)" (1974)

Official audio
- "The Love I Lost" on YouTube

"The Love I Lost" is a song by American R&B group Harold Melvin & the Blue Notes. Group member Teddy Pendergrass sang lead vocals. Originally written as a ballad by Philly soul songwriters Kenny Gamble and Leon Huff, the song was transformed into a funk song and features drummer Earl Young. It was released from the Black & Blue album in late 1973 and sold more than a million copies. It peaked at number seven on the US Billboard Hot 100 and number one on the Billboard Hot R&B chart. In the 21st century, the track has been the subject of extended re-edits by notable remixers Tom Moulton, Theo Parrish, and Dimitri From Paris. In 2022, Rolling Stone magazine ranked "The Love I Lost" number 116 in their list of the "200 Greatest Dance Songs of All Time".

== Disco influence ==
"The Love I Lost" is considered an early example of disco. The track was one of the transitional songs marking the emergence of disco from traditional rhythm and blues as a distinctive style of music.

The 2024 PBS series Disco: Soundtrack of a Revolution explores the importance of "The Love I Lost" to the history of disco music.

== Charts ==
Chart (1973–1974)	Peak position
Belgium (Ultratop 50 Wallonia)	39
Canada Top Singles (RPM)	31
Canada Adult Contemporary (RPM)	97
UK Singles (Official Charts)	21
US Billboard Hot 100	7
US Adult Contemporary (Billboard)	48
US Hot R&B/Hip-Hop Songs (Billboard)	1

== Certifications ==
Region	Certification	Certified units/sales
United States (RIAA)	Gold	1,000,000^{^}
^{^} Shipments figures based on certification alone.

== West End featuring Sybil version ==
"The Love I Lost"

Single by West End featuring Sybil

from the album Doin' It Now! and Good 'N' Ready
- A-side: "You're the Love of My Life" (US)
- B-side: "Sybil-It"
- Released: January 4, 1993
- Genre: Disco; garage
- Length: 3:25
- Label: PWL International
- Songwriters: Gamble and Huff
- Producers: Mike Stock; Pete Waterman

Sybil singles chronology
"You're the Love of My Life" (1993)	"The Love I Lost" (1993)	"When I'm Good and Ready" (1993)

Music video
- "The Love I Lost" on YouTube

On January 4, 1993, American R&B and pop singer-songwriter Sybil released a cover of "The Love I Lost" with British DJ and producer West End (a.k.a. Eddie Gordon). In the United States, it was released as a double A-side with Sybil's previous single, "You're the Love of My Life". West End's version of "The Love I Lost" was produced by Mike Stock and Pete Waterman, released by PWL International, and received positive reviews from music critics. The song reached number 18 on the US Billboard Dance Club Play chart and number three in the United Kingdom. A music video was produced to promote the single.

=== Critical reception ===
AllMusic editor Justin Kantor described the song as a "vibrant, disco-styled cover", noting further that Sybil's "high-energy delivery is soulful, spirited, and commanding". Larry Flick from Billboard magazine wrote, "While urban-ites continue to chew on the sweet 'You're the Love of My Life', popsters are served a sparkling pop/NRG rendition of a Harold Melvin & the Blue Notes classic. This timeless tune gains its current top 40 muscle by Sybil's lively and soulful vocal, and the distinct hand of producers Stock & Waterman. A top-five U.K. smash that should have little trouble making the grade here." The Gavin Report complimented the singer's "sweet, strong vocals". In his weekly UK chart commentary, James Masterton said, "A fairly faithful cover [...], the classic song, coupled with the powerful voice of Sybil makes for one of those soul covers which if anything adds to the original. Notice as well the production credits on the back of such a trendy record - Mike Stock and Pete Waterman, showing that there is life after Kylie and Jason."

Alan Jones from Music Week felt that here, the 1974 hit "makes an easy transition from Philly soul to commercial garage", remarking that "its uplifting, hustling. instrumental track is strangely at odds with the downbeat lyrics, but it's tight, commercial, bright and breezy. A monster in the clubs, and likely to become an equally large pop hit." Another Music Week editor, Andy Beevers, declared it as a "very solid garage reworking". James Hamilton from the Record Mirror Dance Update complimented it as "superb". In 2014, Matt Dunn of WhatCulture ranked the song at number 12 in his "15 unforgettable Stock Aitken Waterman singles" list, commenting on the song's music video, "The music video was a veritable celebration of the early-90s: muted primary colours, silhouetted dancers in silly hats spinning and flailing their arms about, flares and big collars everywhere and lots of classic Sybil moves - sideways glances, eyes up to the sky, shrugging shoulders, hands and arms gesticulating wildly and topped with a clap, plus that funky neck thing she always did."

=== Chart performance ===
"The Love I Lost" became a top-10 hit in Ireland and the United Kingdom, as well as on the Eurochart Hot 100 and European Dance Radio Chart. In the UK, the single peaked at number three during its third week on the UK Singles Chart, on 24 January 1993, and stayed there for two weeks. On both the UK Dance Singles chart and the UK Club Chart, the song reached number one. Additionally, it was a top-20 hit in Finland and a top-70 hit in Germany. It debuted on the Eurochart Hot 100 at number 83 on 23 January 1993, after charting in the UK, and peaked at number nine three weeks later. It ranked in at numbers 84 and 30 on the Eurochart and UK year-end charts, respectively. In the US, "You're the Love of My Life" / "The Love I Lost" peaked at number 90 on the Billboard Hot 100 and at number 18 on the Billboard Maxi-Singles Sales chart, while "The Lost I Lost" by itself peaked at the same position on the Billboard Dance Club Play chart. In Australia, the song only reached number 145 on the ARIA singles chart.

=== Track listing ===
- CD single, UK (1993)
1. "The Love I Lost" (7-inch version) – 3:27
2. "The Love I Lost" (12-inch club mix) – 5:23
3. "The Love I Lost" (Unrequited Mix) – 6:37
4. "Sybil-It" – 3:42

=== Charts ===
==== Weekly charts ====
Chart (1993)	Peak position
Australia (ARIA)	145
Europe (Eurochart Hot 100)	9
Europe (European Dance Radio)	9
Europe (European Hit Radio)	14
Finland (Suomen virallinen lista)	14
Germany (GfK)	68
Ireland (IRMA)	9
Israel (Israeli Singles Chart)	25
Netherlands (Dutch Top 40 Tipparade)	5
Netherlands (Single Top 100 Tip)	11
UK Singles (Official Charts)	3
UK Airplay (Music Week)	2
UK Dance (Music Week)	1
UK Club Chart (Music Week)	1
US Billboard Hot 100 with "You're the Love of My Life"	90
US Dance Club Play (Billboard)	18
US Maxi-Singles Sales (Billboard) with "You're the Love of My Life"	18

==== Year-end charts ====
Chart (1993)	Position
Europe (Eurochart Hot 100)	84
UK Singles (OCC)	30
UK Airplay (Music Week)	23
UK Club Chart (Music Week)	2
