= Lonnie Gordon =

American songwriter (born 1965)

Lonnie Gordon (born November 8, 1965, Philadelphia) is an American female dance, pop and R&B singer and songwriter. She scored several chart hits during the 1990s, most notably for her 1990 UK top 10 single "Happenin' All Over Again".

== Early life and career ==
Born in Philadelphia, Pennsylvania, Gordon moved to the Bronx at an early age. In the early 1980s, she started performing around the Harlem area in clubs as the lead singer of a band called Nythjar. After meeting her husband, she relocated to England in the late 1980s, and retired from the music scene to take care of her daughter Rikki.

Gordon resumed her singing career in 1988 singing lead vocals for club-oriented acts such as Offshore, Deja Vu and most notably, House ensemble Quartzlock, releasing the singles "No Regrets", "Love Eviction" and "You Make Loving Fun". In 1989, she contributed lead vocals to Simon Harris' cover of the On the House song "(I've Got Your) Pleasure Control", which became her first charting single in the UK. The record brought her to the attention of Supreme Records, who offered her a deal in 1989.

The first single on the Supreme label, a cover of First Choice's "Let No Man Put Asunder" (re-titled "It's Not Over (Let No Man Put Asunder)"), was a club hit but did not translate into pop success. For her next single, "Happenin' All Over Again", Gordon collaborated with British hitmaking team Stock Aitken & Waterman (SAW). She had long admired their work with Dead Or Alive, and Supreme acts Mel & Kim and Princess, and was determined to work with them. It was one of the reasons she signed with the record label. The single was released in January 1990. It peaked at No. 4 on the UK Singles Chart, and became a huge hit around Europe.

The planned follow-up single, the uptempo "How Could He Do This to Me", was scrapped (and was never released until years later), and the ballad "Beyond Your Wildest Dreams" was released instead in August 1990. The single peaked at No. 48, with Gordon expressing her disappointment over its performance, and its impact on her forthcoming album campaign. She felt that an upbeat song in the vein of her prior hit should have been chosen instead. However she praised the quality of the record and credited producers SAW for making a credible R&B ballad in tune with the trends of the time.

In November 1990, Gordon released her debut album's title track "If I Have to Stand Alone", which had a similar sound to "Happenin' All Over Again". The single charted at No. 68 in the UK. Her debut album, If I Have to Stand Alone, only received a limited release in Europe, Australia (where it peaked at No. 173 on the ARIA Albums Chart) and Japan.

Gordon expressed her deep distress over the failure of the album to reach the potential of its first hit single, confessing it made her doubt herself for many years, but she now places the blame on political and artistic wrangling between her record company and SAW.

In 1991, Gordon flew to Italy and recorded the song "Gonna Catch You", written and produced by the Italo house group Black Box. During this time, Gordon sported a dramatic makeover: Gone were the long dark curly hair, and in was a blonde buzz cut, which became (and continues to be) a defining trademark for Gordon. It was released as a single in the UK where it became a top 40 hit, peaking at No. 32. Due to its inclusion in the Vanilla Ice film Cool As Ice, the song became her debut release in the U.S., where it peaked at No. 1 on the U.S. Dance charts and at No. 79 on the Billboard Hot 100. This was Gordon's last release with Supreme Records.

Signed to SBK Records, Gordon released her second album Bad Mood in 1993. The album included two further U.S. No. 1 Dance singles, "Bad Mood", and a remixed version of "Happenin' All Over Again", which also peaked at No. 98 in the Billboard Hot 100. A follow-up single, "Do You Want It", also did well on the dance charts in 1994.

Gordon hit the U.S. dance chart twice more in 1996, with the songs "Dirty Love" on Geffen Records, which peaked at No. 6, and "If You Really Love Me" released on Big Bang Records, which peaked at No. 42. In 2000, she released the compilation album No Regret, which included many of her singles and album highlights, as well as two new songs. A cover of "He Lives in You", was released as its lead single. Also, in 1997, Lonnie Gordon worked with European dance producers P.O.F., Roland Michael and Demetrius Ross and remixed the single, If You Really Love Me originally written and recorded by Stevie Wonder.

In 2002, Gordon starred as the lead vocalist and narrator for "Zumanity", another side of Cirque du Soleil, in Las Vegas. Working with Cirque du Soleil and moving to Las Vegas was a bold career move that provided an opportunity for Gordon to showcase her strong vocals and stage presence. After leaving Cirque du Soleil, Gordon made her way back to London, England and constantly toured, working with UK-based company Allaboutdivas.com.

In 2007, Gordon established her own label Gordon Records, from which she released four compilation albums including several new songs. She also exhibited her paintings around this time in Las Vegas.

A remastered special edition CD of her unreleased UK 1990 album, If I Have to Stand Alone, was released in April 2009 on the Cherry Pop record label, with additional unreleased mixes from PWL's vaults.

In 2009, "Catch You Baby", a re-recording of the 1991 hit, "Gonna Catch You", was released by Positiva/EMI as a digital-only download in early August 2009, with a host of mixes, including mixes by Pete Hammond and 7TH Heaven.

In 2010–2011, Gordon again toured the UK and Europe as well as performing at major HIV / AIDS benefits worldwide.

On April 24, 2026, Gordon released the single "Get the Funk" through Royale Box Records.

== Discography ==
=== Studio albums ===
List of studio albums, with selected chart positions
Title	Album details	Peak chart positions	
Title	Album details	AUS	SWE
If I Have to Stand Alone	Released: November 1990; Label: Supreme Records	173	42
Bad Mood	Released: 1993; Label: SBK/EMI Records	—	—

=== Compilation albums ===
List of compilation albums, with selected chart positions
Title	Album details
No Regret	Released: 2000; Label: Centaur Entertainment
Very Best of Lonnie Gordon	Released: 2002; Label: Night & Day Records
Anthems, Vol. I	Released: 2007; Label: Gordon Records
Anthology Vol. 1	Released: 2007; Label: Gordon Records
Anthology Vol. 2	Released: 2007; Label: Gordon Records

=== Singles ===
Year	Title	Chart positions											Album
Year	Title	UK	AUS	BEL (FLA)	FRA	GER	IRE	NED	NZ	SWE	US	US Dance	Album
1989	"It's Not Over (Let No Man Put Asunder)"	91	—	—	—	—	—	—	—	—	—	—	If I Have to Stand Alone
1990	"Happenin' All Over Again"	4	33	25	24	44	3	35	43	14	—	—	If I Have to Stand Alone
1990	"Beyond Your Wildest Dreams"	48	104	—	—	—	—	—	—	—	—	—	If I Have to Stand Alone
1990	"If I Have to Stand Alone"	68	147	—	—	—	—	—	—	—	—	—	If I Have to Stand Alone
1991	"Gonna Catch You"	32	145	—	37	—	—	27	—	—	79	1	Cool as Ice
1993	"Bad Mood"	—	—	—	—	—	—	—	—	—	—	1	Bad Mood
1993	"Happenin' All Over Again '93" (US only)	—	—	—	—	—	—	—	—	—	98	1	Bad Mood
1994	"Do You Want It"	—	—	—	—	—	—	—	—	—	—	5	Bad Mood
1996	"Dirty Love"	—	157	—	—	—	—	—	—	—	—	6	Non-album single
1996	"If You Really Love Me"	—	—	—	—	—	—	—	—	—	—	42	Non-album single
1998	"Beat the Street '98" (UK only)	—	—	—	—	—	—	—	—	—	—	—	Non-album single
1998	"Happenin' All Over Again '98" (US only)	—	—	—	—	—	—	—	—	—	—	—	Non-album single
1999	"Everybody's Talking" (AUS/NZ only)	—	—	—	—	—	—	—	—	—	—	—	Non-album single
2001	"He Lives in You"	—	—	—	—	—	—	—	—	—	—	—	No Regret
"—" denotes releases that did not chart or were not released.

=== As featured artist ===
Year	Title	Chart positions	
Year	Title	UK	US Dance
1987	"Cinco de Mayo" (by Tropical Beat)	—	—
1988	"All Work and No Play" (by Offshore)	—	—
1988	"No Regrets" (by Quartzlock)	—	—
1989	"(I've Got Your) Pleasure Control" (by Simon Harris)	60	23
1989	"Beat the Street" (by Love Inc.)	—	—
1990	"We Got the Love" (by Touch of Soul)	46	—
1995	"Love Eviction" (by Quartz Lock)	32	—
1996	"A God That Can Dance" (by Shield)	—	—
2001	"Falling in and Out of Love" (by Orienta-Rhythm)	—	—
"—" denotes releases that did not chart or were not released.

== See also ==
- List of number-one dance hits (United States)
- List of artists who reached number one on the US Dance chart
