= Altiyan Childs (album) =

Studio album by Altiyan Childs
- Released: 10 December 2010
- Recorded: 2010
- Genres: Pop, rock
- Label: Sony Music Australia

Altiyan Childs chronology
Altiyan Childs (2010)	Born Before the Sun (2015)

Singles from Altiyan Childs
- 1. "Somewhere in the World" Released: 22 November 2010

Altiyan Childs is the debut studio album by 2010 X Factor Australia winner Altiyan Childs. The album was released in Australia on 10 December 2010. It features selected songs that Childs performed as part of the top twelve on The X Factor, including the winner's single "Somewhere in the World".

The song was made available for download following his win on the X Factor on 22 November 2010. "Somewhere in the World" debuted on the ARIA Singles Chart at number eight and also made its debut in New Zealand at number five. The album debuted on the ARIA Albums Chart at number four and certified platinum by the Australian Recording Industry Association. In New Zealand, it reached number three and also certified platinum.

== Background ==
The album was recorded six days after becoming the winner of the second series of The X Factor. It features his highly praised performances of "Livin' on a Prayer", "Eye of the Tiger", "Beautiful Day", "Summer of '69" and the winner's single, "Somewhere in the World". The album does not include Childs' week two performance of Prince's song "Kiss". The single "Somewhere in the World" was written for the final four contestants on The X Factor by Andrew Dorff, Michael Busbee and Klaus Derendorf, who was the producer of the song.

== Singles ==
"Somewhere in the World" was made available as a download-only single following Childs' win on The X Factor on 22 November 2010. It made its first chart appearance in Australia at number eight on the ARIA Singles Chart. In New Zealand, "Somewhere in the World" debuted on the New Zealand Singles Chart at number five.

== Charts and certification ==
=== Charts ===
Chart (2010–11)	Peak position
Australian Albums Chart	3
New Zealand Albums Chart	3

=== Year-end charts ===
Chart (2010)	Rank
Australian Albums Chart	19
Australian Artists Albums Chart	2
New Zealand Albums Chart	22
Chart (2011)	Rank
Australian Albums Chart	87
Australian Artists Albums Chart	18

=== Certifications ===
Country	Certification
Australia	Platinum
New Zealand	Platinum

== Track listing ==
No.	Title	Writer(s)	Length
1.	"Somewhere in the World"	Andrew Dorff, Michael Busbee, Klaus Derendorf	3:59
2.	"Hey, Soul Sister"	Amund Bjørklund, Espen Lind, Patrick Monahan	2:42
3.	"Beautiful Day"	Bono	3:04
4.	"Sex on Fire"	Kings of Leon	2:58
5.	"Livin' on a Prayer"	Jon Bon Jovi, Richie Sambora, Desmond Child	3:17
6.	"Never Tear Us Apart"	Andrew Farriss, Michael Hutchence	2:54
7.	"Blaze of Glory"	Jon Bon Jovi	3:50
8.	"Eye of the Tiger"	Frankie Sullivan, Dominic Nicholls, Jim Peterik	3:07
9.	"Summer of '69"	Bryan Adams, Jim Vallance	2:57
10.	"The Living Years"	Mike Rutherford, B. A. Robertson	3:12
11.	"The Lady in Red"	Chris de Burgh	3:33

== Release history ==
Region	Date	Format	Label	Catalogue
Australia	10 December 2010	CD, digital download	Sony Music Australia	88697818642
New Zealand	10 December 2010	CD, digital download	Sony Music Australia	88697818642
