= Hazlett =

Hazlett is a surname. Notable people with the surname include:

- Allan Hazlett, American philosopher
- Bill Hazlett (1905–1978), New Zealand athlete in rugby
- Charles E. Hazlett (1838–1863), U.S. Army officer, Union artillery commander killed at the Battle of Gettysburg
- Courtney Hazlett (born 1976), US television personality, columnist and Celebrity Correspondent for The Today Show
- Edward Hazlett (1892–1958), childhood friend of U.S. President Dwight D. Eisenhower
- Fanny Hazlett (1837–1933), pioneer and writer
- George Hazlett (1923–2012), Scottish athlete in football
- Harry Hazlett (1884–1960), career officer in the U.S. Army
- Jack Hazlett (1938–2014), New Zealand athlete in rugby
- James Hazlett (disambiguation), any of several men with the name
- Jim Hazlett (1926–2010), U.S. athlete and coach in American football and baseball
- John Vincent Hazlett, birth name of John Massaro (guitarist), U.S. musician (fl. 1980s-present)
- Olive Hazlett (1890–1974), U.S. professor in mathematics at University of Illinois
- Steve Hazlett (born 1957), Canadian athlete in ice hockey
- Thomas Hazlett (born 1952), U.S. professor in economics at Clemson University

== See also ==
- Mount Hazlett, mountain in Antarctica
- Hazlett (musician), Australian singer-songwriter
- Hazlitt (name)
