= Somewhere in the World (song) =

Single by Altiyan Childs

from the album Altiyan Childs
- Released: 22 November 2010
- Recorded: 2010
- Genre: Pop rock
- Length: 3:59
- Label: Sony
- Songwriters: Andrew Dorff; Busbee; Klaus Derendorf
- Producer: Klaus Derendorf

Altiyan Childs singles chronology
"Somewhere in the World" (2010)	"Ordinary Man" (2011)

"Somewhere in the World" is the debut single by series two winner of The X Factor Australia, Altiyan Childs. Serving as the lead single from his self-titled debut album, "Somewhere in the World" was released for digital download following his win on The X Factor on 22 November 2010. The song debuted on the ARIA Singles Chart at number eight, with sales of 15,706 units in its first week of release. In New Zealand, "Somewhere in the World" reached number five on the singles chart.

== Background and release ==
"Somewhere in the World" was written by Andrew Dorff, Busbee and Klaus Derendorf, who also produced the track. The four finalists of the second series of The X Factor Australia, which included including Childs, Mahogany, Sally Chatfield and Andrew Lawson, recorded the song in preparation for a single release as soon as the winner was announced. After Childs was announced the winner of the series, "Somewhere in the World" was given to him as his debut single and released digitally on 22 November 2010. It impacted Australian mainstream radio stations the following day and became the third most added song to radio in its second week of release.

== Chart performance and promotion ==
"Somewhere in the World" debuted at number eight on the ARIA Singles Chart, with first-week sales of 15,706 units. In New Zealand, the song debuted at number five on the singles chart, before dropping four places down to number nine the following week. In 2014, "Somewhere in the World" was certified platinum by the Australian Recording Industry Association (ARIA), for sales exceeding 70,000 copies.

The music video was filmed in two days in King Street, Newtown in November 2010, and premiered online on 3 December 2010. Childs performed "Somewhere in the World" on Sunrise on 9 December 2010.

== Track listing ==
- Digital download
1. "Somewhere in the World" – 3:59

== Personnel ==
- Vocals – Altiyan Childs
- Songwriting – Andrew Dorff, Busbee, Klaus Derendorf
- Production – Klaus Derendorf
- Engineering – Braddon Williams
- Mastering – Tom Coyne

== Charts ==
=== Weekly charts ===
Chart (2010)	Peak position
Australia (ARIA)	8
New Zealand (Recorded Music NZ)	5

=== Year-end charts ===
Chart (2010)	Peak position
Australian Artists Singles Chart	19

== Certifications ==
Region	Certification	Certified units/sales
Australia (ARIA)	Platinum	70,000^{^}
^{^} Shipments figures based on certification alone.

== Release history ==
Region	Date	Format	Label
Australia	22 November 2010	Digital download	Sony Music Australia
New Zealand	22 November 2010	Digital download	Sony Music Australia

== See also ==
- List of top 10 singles in 2010 (Australia)
