= Haslet (disambiguation) =

Haslet is a herbed pork meatloaf.

Haslet may also refer to:

- Haslet, Texas, United States, a city
- John Haslet (1727–1777), American clergyman and soldier
- Joseph Haslet (1769–1823), American farmer and politician

== See also ==
- Haslett (surname)
- Haslett, Michigan, United States, a census-designated place
- Hazlet (disambiguation)
- Hazlitt (disambiguation)
