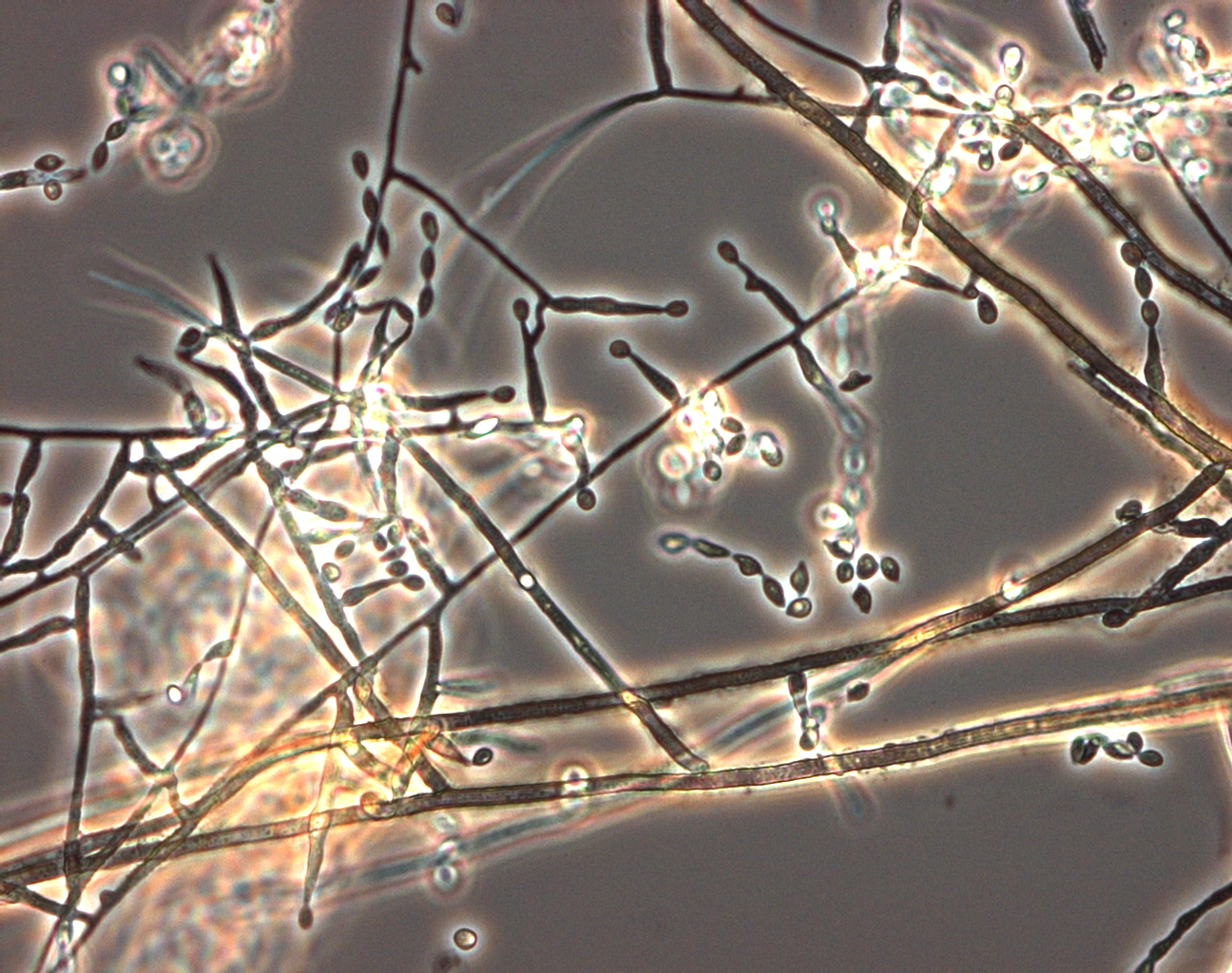

Scientific classification
- Domain: Eukaryota
- Kingdom: Fungi
- Division: Ascomycota
- Class: Sordariomycetes
- Order: Sordariales
- Family: Chaetomiaceae
- Genus: Acrophialophora
- Species: A. fusispora

Binomial name
- Acrophialophora fusispora (S.B.Saksena) Samson (1970)

Synonyms
- Paecilomyces fusisporus S.B.Saksena (1953); Masoniella indica M.A.Salam & P.Ramarao (1960); Ampullifera seudatica Subrahm. (1979); Acrophialophora seudatica (Subrahm.) Sand.-Den., Guarro, & Gené (2015)

= Acrophialophora fusispora =

Species of ascomycete fungus

Acrophialophora fusispora is a poorly studied ascomycete fungus found in soil, air and various plants. A. fusispora is morphologically similar to the genera Paecilomyces and Masonia, but differ in the presence of pigmented conidiophores, verticillate phialides, and frequent sympodial proliferation. Moreover, A. fusispora is distinguished by its pigmented spindle-shaped conidia, covered with spiral bands. The fungus is naturally found in soils of tropical to temperate regions. The fungus has been identified as a plant and animal pathogen, and has recently been recognized as an emerging opportunistic human pathogen. A. fusispora infection in human is rare and has few documented clinical cases, but due to the rarity of the fungus and potential misidentification, the infections may be underdiagnosed. Clinical cases of A. fusispora include cases of keratitis, pulmonary colonization and infection, and cerebral infections. The fungus also has two documented cases of infection in dogs.

== History ==
The genus Acrophialophora was created by Edward J. C. in the year 1959, with a single species, Acrophialophora nainiana. However, the genus was not accepted as a distinct genus until 1970 when Samson and Mahmood differentiated Acrophialophora from the morphologically similar genera Paecilomyces and Masonia, and described the species, Acrophialophora fusispora.

== Taxonomy ==
The genus Acrophialophora consist of three species: A. fusispora, A. levis, and A. seudatica, while A. fusispora, A. nainiana, and M. indica were found to be of the same species, now labeled with a single name, A. fusispora. The 3 species are differentiated by consistent morphological differences, such as conidial size, shape, or color. Through genetic analysis, A. fusispora was found to belong to the family Chaetomiaceae, which includes mostly cellulose decomposers found in the soil, and thermotolerant opportunistic pathogens.

== Growth and morphology ==
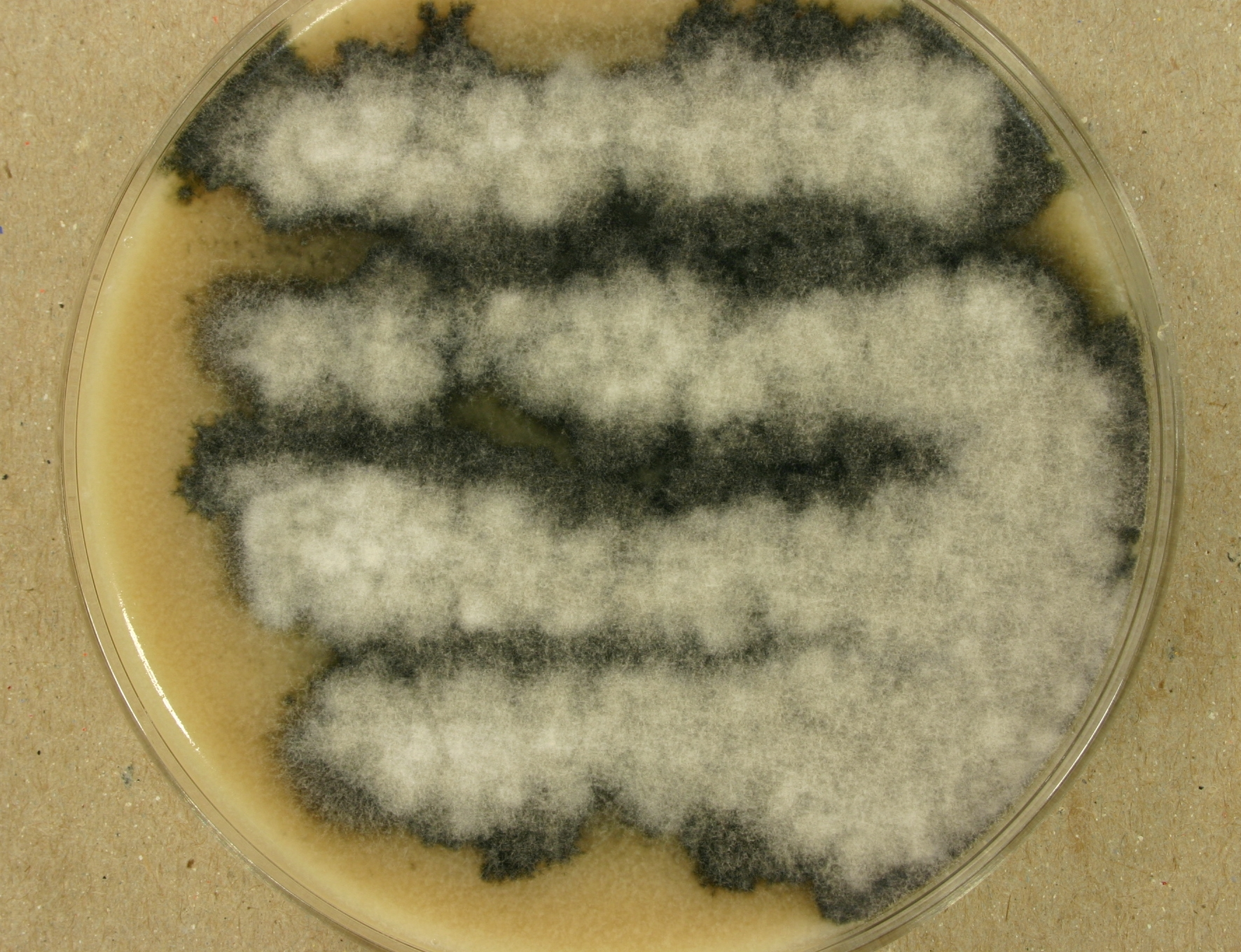
Acrophialophora fusispora (UAMH 11640) colony on CER incubated for 7 days at 30 C

Acrophialophora fusispora is similar to Paecilomyces, but differ in the presence of pigmented, warted conidiophores, verticillate phialides in limited numbers with narrowing tip, and frequent sympodial proliferation. A. fusispora is distinguished by its pigmented fusiform conidia, which are covered by spiral bands, measuring 5–12 x 3–6 μm. The conidia arises in long single-cell basipetal chains, ranging from colorless to pale-brown and broadly ellipsoidal to lemon-shaped. The conidiophores arise singly, terminally, and laterally from the hyphae, and are erect or ascending, straight or flexuous, smooth or rough, and septate. Moreover, the conidiophores are thick-walled with brown at the base and pale towards the apex. The conidiophores are up to 1.5 μm long and 2–5 μm wide, with whorls of phialides at the end. The phialides are flask-shaped and swollen near the base, with a long, narrow neck, and hyaline, smooth or spiny wall. The phialides are borne on conidiophores, or sometimes, on vegetative hyphae, with the broadest part measuring 9–15 μm x 3–4.5 μm.

Acrophialophora fusispora only reproduces asexually. The colonies of A. fusispora are dense, matted and felt-like at the base, with cottony aerial hyphae. The color of the colonies is initially dull white, but becoming grayish-brown, with black colony reverse. The colonies can reach 4–7 cm in diameter within 14 days at 25 °C on Malt Extract Agar. In vitro growth was found to be stimulated by exudates and extracts of Cassia tora. The fungus also grows well and sporulates freely on potato dextrose agar.

== Habitat and ecology ==
Acrophialophora fusispora has been isolated from soil, air, and various plants, such as Cajanus, Cicer, maize, and Tephrosia. The fungus found in the soil of tropical to temperate regions, and is known from uncultivated soils, field soils, under leguminous plants or grasses, forest soils, and salt-marshes. With exception of records from Czechoslovakia, Singapore, Tuamotu Archipelago, Egypt, and Pakistan, A. fusispora is almost exclusively reported from India. The fungus has been found commonly on root surfaces and rhizospheres of grasses, cotton, Euphorbia species and Carica papaya, and on rhizoids of Funaria species. Additionally, A. fusispora has also been isolated from earthworm casts and woods exposed to seawater. Moreover, in the rhizosphere of Trigonella foenum-graecum, foliar spray with the antibiotic subamycin increases the potential for A. fusispora isolation.

Acrophialophora fusispora exhibits a distinct preference for deeper (30–45 cm) soil horizon in India. The fungus is thermotolerant, with a minimum temperature of 14 °C (57 °F), optimum temperature at 40 °C (104 °F), and maximum temperature of 50 °C (122 °F).

== Pathogenicity ==
Acrophialophora fusispora has been recognized as an emerging opportunistic human pathogen, responsible for cases of keretitis, pulmonary colonization and infection in patients with cystic fibrosis, and cerebral infections. However, as the fungus is very rare with high possibility of misidentification, there has been concerns of underdiagnosed A. fusispora infections. There exists only 6 cases of well-documented A. fusispora infection in human, and within which, only 1 case was confirmed as A. fusispora by sequencing.

Antifungal susceptibility data for the fungus was limited and based on only a small number of clinical cases. An antifungal drug test demonstrated that voriconazole had the greatest in vitro activity, while other antifungal drugs, such as amphotericin B, itraconazole, posaconazole, terbinafine, anidulafungin, caspofungin, micafungin, showed little in vitro activity against the fungus. However, variable antifungal results were shown in different clinical cases.
