= Hazlitt =

Hazlitt may refer to:

- Hazlitt (name)
- Hazlitt Theatre, one of the main theatres in Maidstone, Kent
- Hazlitt's, a hotel in Soho, London
- Hazlitt (magazine), a Canadian online literary magazine

== See also ==
- Haslet (disambiguation)
- Haslett
- Hazlet (disambiguation)
