= List of top 10 singles for 2010 in Australia =

This is a list of singles that charted in the top ten of the ARIA Charts in 2010.

== Top-ten singles ==
Key

Symbol	Meaning
◁	Indicates single's top 10 entry was also its ARIA top 50 debut
(#)	2010 Year-end top 10 single position and rank

List of ARIA top ten singles that peaked in 2010
Top ten entry date	Single	Artist(s)	Peak	Peak date	Weeks in top ten	References
Singles from 2009
14 December	"Whatcha Say"	Jason Derulo	5	4 January	10	
21 December	"Fireflies" (#6)	Owl City	1	4 January	15	
Singles from 2010
4 January	"Replay"	Iyaz	1	8 February	13	
18 January	"Haven't Met You Yet"	Michael Bublé	9	18 January	3	
18 January	"Blah Blah Blah" ◁	Kesha featuring 3OH!3	3	15 February	10	
25 January	"Rock That Body"	The Black Eyed Peas	8	25 January	2	
1 February	"Little Lion Man"	Mumford & Sons	3	8 February	3	
8 February	"Do You Remember"	Jay Sean featuring Sean Paul and Lil Jon	7	15 February	4	
8 February	"Memories"	David Guetta featuring Kid Cudi	3	8 March	10	
15 February	"Today Was a Fairytale" ◁	Taylor Swift	3	22 February	5	
22 February	"3 Words"	Cheryl Cole featuring Will.i.am	5	22 March	6	
22 February	"Rude Boy"	Rihanna	1	8 March	8	
22 February	"Tik Tok (parody)"	The Midnight Beast	4	8 March	5	
22 February	"In My Head" ◁	Jason Derulo	1	22 February	11	
1 March	"Telephone"	Lady Gaga featuring Beyoncé	3	29 March	5	
8 March	"Hey, Soul Sister" (#4)	Train	1	22 March	13	
29 March	"If We Ever Meet Again"	Timbaland featuring Katy Perry	9	5 April	2	
29 March	"Imma Be"	The Black Eyed Peas	7	29 March	2	
5 April	"I Like That"	Richard Vission and Static Revenger featuring Luciana	3	12 April	6	
5 April	"I Made It (Cash Money Heroes)" ◁	Kevin Rudolf featuring Birdman, Jay Sean and Lil Wayne	4	5 April	4	
12 April	"You’ve Got the Love"	Florence and the Machine	9	12 April	1	
12 April	"Nothin' on You"	B.o.B featuring Bruno Mars	3	10 May	8	
12 April	"Baby"	Justin Bieber featuring Ludacris	3	3 May	5	
19 April	"OMG" (#2)	Usher featuring Will.i.am	1	10 May	14	
19 April	"Alejandro"	Lady Gaga	2	26 April	5	
19 April	"Whataya Want from Me"	Adam Lambert	4	26 April	5	
19 April	"Just Say So" ◁	Brian McFadden featuring Kevin Rudolf	1	19 April	7	
3 May	"Mr. Mysterious"	Vanessa Amorosi featuring Seany B	4	10 May	2	
10 May	"Ridin' Solo"	Jason Derulo	4	14 June	7	
17 May	"Airplanes"	B.o.B featuring Hayley Williams	2	24 May	12	
17 May	"Not Afraid"	Eminem	4	17 May	12	
17 May	"Break Your Heart"	Taio Cruz featuring Ludacris	2	17 May	7	
24 May	"Your Love Is My Drug"	Kesha	3	31 May	6	
24 May	"We No Speak Americano"	Yolanda Be Cool and DCUP	4	31 May	8	
24 May	"California Gurls" (#5) ◁	Katy Perry featuring Snoop Dogg	1	21 June	16	
7 June	"Opposite of Adults"	Chiddy Bang	10	7 June	1	
7 June	"Gettin' Over You"	David Guetta and Chris Willis featuring Fergie and LMFAO	5	21 June	7	
7 June	"Jessie's Girl"	Glee Cast	8	7 June	1	
14 June	"Lying"	Amy Meredith	10	14 June	1	
14 June	"Billionaire"	Travie McCoy featuring Bruno Mars	5	19 July	10	
28 June	"I Like It"	Enrique Iglesias featuring Pitbull	2	12 July	11	
5 July	"Love the Way You Lie" (#1)	Eminem featuring Rihanna	1	19 July	15	
5 July	"Smile"	Uncle Kracker	3	5 July	4	
19 July	"If I Had You"	Adam Lambert	4	26 July	9	
26 July	"DJ Got Us Fallin' in Love" (#10) ◁	Usher featuring Pitbull	3	2 August	13	
26 July	"I Hate Mondays" ◁	Newton Faulkner	8	26 July	2	
2 August	"Dynamite" (#3)	Taio Cruz	1	30 August	14	
2 August	"Club Can't Handle Me"	Flo Rida featuring David Guetta	3	16 August	9	
9 August	"Teenage Dream" (#9) ◁	Katy Perry	2	6 September	11	
16 August	"Mine" ◁	Taylor Swift	9	16 August	1	
30 August	"Take It Off"	Kesha	5	6 September	5	
6 September	"Just the Way You Are" (#8)	Bruno Mars	1	25 October	12	
13 September	"Forget You"	CeeLo Green	5	11 October	8	
13 September	"Like It's Her Birthday"	Good Charlotte	7	13 September	1	
20 September	"Cooler than Me"	Mike Posner	4	11 October	9	
20 September	"Just A Dream"	Nelly	3	25 October	10	
27 September	"Only Girl (In the World)" (#7) ◁	Rihanna	1	27 September	13	
4 October	"Magic"	B.o.B featuring Rivers Cuomo	5	4 October	4	
4 October	"Planets" ◁	Short Stack	4	4 October	1	
18 October	"Raise Your Glass" ◁	Pink	1	18 October	12	
25 October	"Hey Baby (Drop It to the Floor)"	Pitbull featuring T-Pain	10	25 October	1	
25 October	"Freefallin"	Zoë Badwi	9	25 October	2	
1 November	"Barbra Streisand"	Duck Sauce	9	1 November	2	
1 November	"Like a G6"	Far East Movement featuring The Cataracs and Dev	2	15 November	10	
8 November	"Heartbeat"	Enrique Iglesias featuring Nicole Scherzinger	5	15 November	4	
8 November	"Firework"	Katy Perry	3	29 November	11	
8 November	"We R Who We R" ◁	Kesha	1	8 November	10	
15 November	"The Time (Dirty Bit)" ◁	The Black Eyed Peas	1	22 November	10	
22 November	"Fuckin' Perfect" ◁	Pink	10	22 November	1	
29 November	"Somewhere in the World" ◁	Altiyan Childs	8	29 November	1	
29 November	"Yeah 3x" ◁	Chris Brown	4	27 December	13	
6 December	"Grenade"	Bruno Mars	1	13 December	10	
6 December	"Who's That Girl"	Guy Sebastian featuring Eve	1	27 December	10	
13 December	"Stay the Night"	James Blunt	10	13 December	1	
20 December	"Saturday Night"	Jessica Mauboy featuring Ludacris	7	27 December	4	

=== 2009 peaks ===
List of ARIA top ten singles in 2010 that peaked in 2009
Top ten entry date	Single	Artist(s)	Peak	Peak date	Weeks in top ten	References
15 June	"I Gotta Feeling" ◁	The Black Eyed Peas	1	29 June	21	
2 November	"Down" ◁	Jay Sean featuring Lil Wayne	2	23 November	12	
2 November	"Tik Tok"	Kesha	1	9 November	16	
9 November	"Starstrukk"	3OH!3 featuring Katy Perry	4	23 November	10	
9 November	"Bad Romance"	Lady Gaga	2	14 December	14	
30 November	"Empire State of Mind"	Jay Z featuring Alicia Keys	4	14 December	12	
30 November	"Black Box" ◁	Stan Walker	2	30 November	9	
7 December	"Art of Love"	Guy Sebastian featuring Jordin Sparks	8	14 December	5	

=== 2011 peaks ===
List of ARIA top ten singles in 2010 that peaked in 2011
Top ten entry date	Single	Artist(s)	Peak	Peak date	Weeks in top ten	References
27 December	"Who's That Chick?"	David Guetta featuring Rihanna	7	17 January	8	

== Entries by artist ==
The following table shows artists who achieved two or more top 10 entries in 2010, including songs that reached their peak in 2009 and 2011. The figures include both main artists and featured artists. The total number of weeks an artist spent in the top ten in 2010 is also shown.

Entries	Artist	Weeks	Songs
6	Will.i.am (includes songs as part of The Black Eyed Peas)	30	"3 Words", "I Gotta Feeling", "Imma Be", "OMG", "Rock That Body", "The Time (Dirty Bit)"
5	Fergie (includes songs as part of The Black Eyed Peas)	19	"Gettin' Over You", "I Gotta Feeling", "Imma Be", "Rock That Body", "The Time (Dirty Bit)"
5	Katy Perry	33	"California Gurls", "Firework", "If We Ever Meet Again", "Starstrukk", "Teenage Dream"
5	Kesha	31	"Blah Blah Blah", "Take It Off", "Tik Tok", "We R Who We R", "Your Love Is My Drug"
4	The Black Eyed Peas	12	"I Gotta Feeling", "Imma Be", "Rock That Body", "The Time (Dirty Bit)"
4	Bruno Mars	34	"Billionaire", "Grenade", "Just the Way You Are", "Nothin' On You"
4	David Guetta	27	"Club Can't Handle Me", "Gettin' Over You", "Memories", "Who's That Chick?"
4	Rihanna	34	"Love the Way You Lie", "Only Girl (In the World)", "Rude Boy", "Who's That Chick?"
3	B.o.B	21	"Airplanes", "Magic", "Nothin' On You"
3	Jason Derulo	25	"In My Head", "Ridin' Solo", "Whatcha Say"
3	Jay Sean	11	"Do You Remember", "Down", "I Made It (Cash Money Heroes)"
3	Lady Gaga	16	"Alejandro", "Bad Romance", "Telephone"
3	Ludacris	14	"Baby", "Break Your Heart", "Saturday Night"
3	Pitbull	18	"DJ Got Us Fallin' in Love", "Hey Baby (Drop It to the Floor)", "I Like It"
2	3OH!3	12	"Blah Blah Blah", "Starstrukk"
2	Adam Lambert	14	"If I Had You", "Whataya Want From Me"
2	Eminem	18	"Love the Way You Lie", "Not Afraid"
2	Enrique Iglesias	15	"Heartbeat", "I Like It"
2	Guy Sebastian	5	"Art of Love", "Who's That Girl"
2	Lil Wayne	7	"Down", "I Made It (Cash Money Heroes)"
2	Kevin Rudolf	9	"I Made It (Cash Money Heroes)", "Just Say So"
2	Pink	12	"Fuckin' Perfect", "Raise Your Glass"
2	Taio Cruz	21	"Break Your Heart", "Dynamite"
2	Taylor Swift	6	"Mine", "Today Was a Fairytale"
2	Usher	27	"DJ Got Us Fallin' in Love", "OMG"

== See also ==
- 2010 in music
- ARIA Charts
- List of number-one singles of 2010 (Australia)
- List of top 25 singles for 2010 in Australia
