= Hazlet =

Hazlet may refer to:

- Hazlet, New Jersey, United States
- Hazlet, Saskatchewan, Canada
- Hazlet (NJT station), one of 20 New Jersey Transit commuter rail stations on the North Jersey Coast Line

== See also ==
- Haslet (disambiguation)
- Haslett
- Hazlitt (disambiguation)
