= Sony Music Australia =

Australian record label; imprint of Sony Music Entertainment Australia Pty Limited

Sony Music Entertainment Australia Pty Ltd
- Parent company: Sony Music Entertainment
- Founded: 1938; 88 years ago (as Australian Record Company)
- Country of origin: Australia
- Location: Sydney, Melbourne
- Official website: www.sonymusic.com.au

Sony Music Entertainment Australia is the predominant record label operated by American parent company Sony Music Entertainment in Australia. Prior to 1995, SMEA published and distributed video games in Australia & New Zealand on behalf of Sony Imagesoft and Sony Electronic Publishing Europe, and briefly operated Sony's PlayStation business in Australia & New Zealand on behalf of Sony Computer Entertainment Europe.

Sony Music Entertainment Australia, as of July 2017, also runs British multimedia Ministry of Sound Recordings' Australian operations on behalf of Sony Music UK, taking over from recently renamed TMRW Music, formerly a wholly owned subsidiary of Ministry of Sound until 2004.

== Current artists ==
The following is a list of artists current signed to Sony Music Australia:

- AC/DC
- A.D.K.O.B
- Adam Harvey
- Amy Shark
- Becca Hatch
- The Belligerents
- Billy Davis
- Carmouflage Rose
- Clews
- Cosmo's Midnight
- Darling Brando
- Daryl Braithwaite (also contracted to Columbia Records)
- David Campbell
- DNA Songs
- Drapht
- Elk Road
- Emalia
- Finding Faith
- Gang of Youths
- Georgie Mae
- Graace
- Guy Sebastian (Australian Idol winner, 2003)
- Happiness Is Wealth
- Hollow Coves
- Holy Holy
- Hozier
- Human Nature
- Illy (since 2018)
- Isaiah Firebrace
- Jai Waetford (X Factor third place, 2013)
- Joe Moore
- John Farnham
- Josh Pyke
- Karnivool
- Kira Puru
- Kota Banks
- Lah-Lah
- Lil Tr33zy
- LDRU
- Maddy Jane
- Mark Vincent (Australia's Got Talent winner, 2009)
- May-a
- Midnight Oil
- Mike Waters
- Montaigne
- Natalie Bassingthwaighte
- Northeast Party House
- O'Shea
- The Paper Kites
- Peking Duk
- Pete Murray
- Peter Garrett
- Pinkish Blu
- Rival Fire
- Robinson
- Roland Tings
- Ruel
- RÜFÜS DU SOL
- Samantha Jade (X Factor winner, 2012)
- Tash Sultana
- Tayla Mae
- Tim Wheatley
- Tones and I
- Triple One
- The Vanns

== Former artists ==
- The 1975 (under licence from Dirty Hit)
- Akouo
- Alexander Biggs
- Altiyan Childs (X Factor winner, 2010)
- Amy Meredith
- Amy Pearson (Peppermint Blue/Columbia)
- Anise K
- Anthony Callea (Australian Idol runner-up, 2004)
- Ashley Burke (2013)
- Augie March
- Australia's Got Talent (2007–2013)
- Australian Idol (2003–2009)
- Axle Whitehead
- The X Factor Australia (2011–2017)
- Beau Ryan
- Bella Ferraro (X Factor fourth place, 2012)
- Bonnie Anderson (Australia's Got Talent winner, 2007)
- Brooke Fraser
- Brothers3 (X Factor third place, 2014)
- Carmada
- Casey Donovan (Australian Idol winner, 2004)
- Kate Ceberano
- Cassie Davis
- Chris Rose
- Channel Seven personalities and shows
- Cold Clinical Love
- Coldrain
- The Collective (X Factor third place, 2012)
- Conrad Sewell
- Cousin Tony's Brand New Firebird
- Cyrus Villanueva (X Factor winner, 2015)
- Dami Im (X Factor winner, 2013)
- Damien Leith (Australian Idol season 4 winner)
- Dean Ray (X Factor runner-up, 2014)
- Delta Goodrem
- Dewayne Everettsmith
- Didier Cohen
- Emily Williams (Australian Idol runner-up, 2005)
- Georgia Perry
- Geri Halliwell
- Glass Towers
- Helena
- Hi-5
- Halycon Drive
- Hazlett
- Hoodoo Gurus
- Jack Vidgen (Australia's Got Talent winner, 2011)
- Jackie Onassis
- Jackson McLaren
- The Janoskians
- Jason Owen (X Factor runner-up, 2012)
- Jess & Matt (X Factor third place, 2015)
- Jessica Mauboy (Australian Idol runner-up, 2006)
- Jezzabell Doran
- Johnny Ruffo (X Factor third place, 2011)
- Jordan Jansen
- JOY
- Justice Crew (Australia's Got Talent winners 2010)
- Kate DeAraugo (Australian Idol winner, 2005)
- Kate Miller-Heidke
- Katie Noonan
- Kaz James
- Kids of 88
- Krill
- Kyle Bielfield
- Leony
- Little Sea
- Lovers Electric
- The Lulu Raes
- M4sonic
- Marcus Santoro
- Marlisa Punzalan (X Factor winner, 2014)
- Matthew Hardy
- Max & Bianca
- Michael Paynter
- Miracle
- Missy Lancaster
- Mr. Little Jeans
- MuteMath
- Natalie Gauci (Australian Idol winner, 2007)
- Nathaniel Willemse (X Factor finalist, 2012)
- Neighbours (1989–2011)
- Network Ten (1989–2011)
- Old Man River
- Olivia Newton-John
- Paulini (Australian Idol fourth place, 2003)
- The Prodigy (1992-2004; licensed from XL Recordings)
- Tim Freedman
- Rachael Beck
- Reece Mastin (X Factor winner, 2011)
- Reigan Derry (X Factor fourth place, 2014)
- Rogue Traders
- Scarlett Belle
- Stan Walker (Australian Idol winner, 2009)
- Taylor Henderson (X Factor runner up, 2013)
- Shannon Noll (Australian Idol runner-up, 2003)
- Skybombers
- Small Mercies
- So Fresh compilation albums (previously joint with Universal Music Australia)
- Smoothfm compilation albums
- So You Think You Can Dance Australia (2008–2010)
- Straalen McCallum
- Syndicate
- The Ten Tenors
- Third Degree (X Factor fourth place, 2013)
- Tim Omaji (Australia's Got Talent third place, 2011)
- Tonight Alive
- The Vines
- Wes Carr (Australian Idol winner, 2008)
- The Wiggles
- Young Divas
- Young Men Society (X Factor finalist, 2011)
- The Veronicas
- Way of the Eagle
- Will Sparks

== Sony sub labels ==
=== Columbia Records/CBS Records ===
- Daryl Braithwaite
- Cherry
- Craig Maclachlan & Check 1/2
- Died Pretty
- Matt Finish
- Midnight Oil
- Moscos & Stone
- Nikka Costa
- The Atlantics
- The Fan Club
- Tina Arena
- Uncanny X-Men
- Wa Wa Nee

=== Epic Records ===
- CDB
- INXS
- Serious Young Insects
- The Poor

=== RCA Records ===
- ABBA
- Chicks Incorporated
- Divinyls
- Girl Overboard
- Girlfriend
- Natalie Imbruglia
- Max Merritt & The Meteors
- Oblivia
- Solid Citizens
- Southern Sons
- You Am I

=== Ariola Records ===
- Bodyjar
- Boom Crash Opera
- Divinyls
- GF4
- Jack Jones

=== Art Records (via BMG) ===
- Custard
- Melissa James
- Ratcat
- The Screaming Jets
- Wendy Matthews
- You Am I

=== Gotham Records, Transistor, JVC (via BMG) ===
- Bachelor Girl
- Trial Kennedy
- Merril Bainbridge
- Nikki Webster
- Katie Underwood
- Vanessa Amorosi
