= James Hazlett =

James Hazlett may refer to:

- James M. Hazlett (1864–1941), Republican member of the U.S. House of Representatives from Pennsylvania
- Jim Hazlett (1926–2010), college baseball and football head coach

== See also ==
- Jim Haslett (born 1955), NFL coach and former player
