= Klaus Derendorf =

American songwriter and record producer

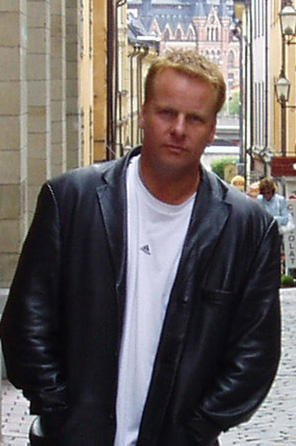

Background information
- Origin: Los Angeles, California, United States
- Genres: Pop, rock, R&B, Dance
- Occupations: Songwriter (track and melody), instrumentalist (guitar, bass, keyboards), music producer, music publisher
- Years active: 1990–present
- Labels: Various Major & Indie

Klaus Derendorf, also known as Klaus D, is a Los Angeles–based record producer and songwriter with millions of worldwide record sales to his credit including several Number 1 records on the Billboard charts and around the world.

== Early years ==
Klaus is of German descent but was raised in several different countries due to his family living and working abroad. Derendorf is fluent in English, Spanish and German, and credits his musical diversity to different influences from the US, Europe and Latin America. He picked up the guitar at age nine and began playing and writing songs in junior high school bands from age 13, eventually settling in Los Angeles.

== Career ==
After finishing high school, Derendorf started working with producer Rick Parashar in Seattle, Washington recording rock bands in the 1990s. He spent most of the 90s as a guitarist and songwriter in Los Angeles recording as well as touring with a variety of artists before focusing exclusively on producing and songwriting. Derendorf credits David Foster and A&R executive Jaymes Foster for giving him his first production jobs at the Warner Music Group.

Derendorf was elected to the board of governors of the L.A. Chapter of NARAS (National Academy of Recording Arts & Sciences), and is actively involved in all current industry issues as well as the election process of The Grammys.

== Work ==
He participated in the beginning of the TV-Idol era with the Pop Stars USA project, which launched the group Eden's Crush on Warner Music.

Derendorf went on to produce Carlos Santana's album Shaman which debuted at Number 1. Other notable producing and writing credits include Josh Groban's Closer, another Number 1 debut, Australia's Stephanie McIntosh's Tightrope, Eden's Crush's Popstars (feat. Nicole Scherzinger) and many others.

In 2008, Derendorf was reportedly working on tracks with such stars as Delta Goodrem, Beto Cuevas, British artists Tiffany Page, and Amy Pearson and Australian rockers Michael Paynter and The Androids.

Recently he has been writing and producing records with Oprah Winfrey and David Foster protégé Charice, The X Factor (UK) judge Cheryl Cole of UK act Girls Aloud, Latin stars Anahí and Christopher Uckermann, formerly of RBD, and several other artists. Beto Cuevas's debut album featuring two tracks co-written by Derendorf was nominated for a Latin Grammy in 2009. Cheryl Cole's track "Didn't I", produced by Derendorf, and co-written with Cole and Andrea Remanda was released as the B-Side to Cheryl's solo debut single "Fight for this Love" and debuted at Number 1 in the UK and Ireland in October 2009. Charice's debut album was released by Warner Music on May 11, 2010, and debuted in the Top 10 Billboard 200 album chart. The album also reached Number 1 on the Japanese charts in summer 2010.

In November 2010, Derendorf was asked by Sony Music and X Factor producers to write and produce the winner's single for the X Factor Australia finalists. On November 15, 2010, Australian TV network Channel 7 aired a segment with Derendorf and the four finalists. Derendorf produced and co-wrote the winners single "Somewhere in the world" for X Factor winner Altiyan Childs, which was released on SyCo / Sony Music on November 23, 2010, and debuted at Number 1 on iTunes.

In February 2011, Derendorf produced and co-wrote the debut single "Heal" by 15-year-old German teen sensation Andrea Renzullo, finalist on another SyCo Television show, Germany's Got Talent ("Das Supertalent"). According to media reports, Sony Music released the single in March 2011.

On October 1, 2011, Derendorf's record "One Thousand Voices", the new theme song of the hit TV show The Voice, debuted at Number 1 in The Netherlands.
