= Masonia =

Australian rock band

- Also known as: Blind Verdict
- Origin: Sydney, New South Wales, Australia
- Genres: Rock
- Years active: 2004–2008
- Labels: Silver Back/MGM
- Past members: Moe Bloomfield; Altiyan Childs; Daniel Rivers; Kris Petersen; Danul Stewart; Dane Charles; Nathan Merryment; Frank Colaiacolo; Hugh Cook

Masonia, were an Australian rock band, which formed in 2004 with the line-up of Moe Bloomfield on bass guitar and backing vocals, Altiyan Childs on lead vocals and guitar, Nathan Merryment on drums and Daniel Rivers on keyboards and backing vocals. Their debut single, "Simple" (2004), reached No. 41 on the ARIA singles chart. Masonia issued a sole studio album, World on Fire (November 2005) via Silver Back Records/MGM Distribution. The group disbanded in 2008. Childs auditioned for the second Australian season of The X Factor in 2010, which he won. Rivers began producing soul, R&B and hip-hop music as Dans Pies. Bloomfield was a member of the Deer Republic, which won the 2009 Tooheys Extra Dry UncharTED competition.

== Members ==
- Moe Bloomfield – bass guitar, backing vocals
- Altiyan Childs – lead vocals, guitar
- Daniel Rivers – keyboards, backing vocals
- Nathan Merryment drums
- Kris Petersen – guitar, backing vocals
- Danul Stewart – guitar, backing vocals
- Dane Charles – drums
- Frank Colaiacolo – drums
- Hugh Cook – drums

== Discography ==
=== Albums ===
- World on Fire (14 November 2005) Silver Back Records/MGM Distribution (MGM SBR9-A1)

=== Extended plays ===
- Anywhere with You (2006)

=== Singles ===
- "Simple" (2004) – AUS: No. 41
- "Anywhere with You" (2006)
- "Dream" (2007)
