= Beautiful Day =

2000 single by U2

Single by U2

from the album All That You Can't Leave Behind
- B-side: "Summer Rain"; "Always"
- Released: 9 October 2000
- Studio: HQ (Dublin, Ireland)
- Genre: Rock
- Length: 4:06
- Label: Island; Interscope
- Composer: U2
- Lyricist: Bono
- Producers: Daniel Lanois; Brian Eno; Steve Lillywhite

U2 singles chronology
"Sweetest Thing" (1998)	"Beautiful Day" (2000)	"Stuck in a Moment You Can't Get Out Of" (2001)

Music video
- "Beautiful Day" on YouTube

Audio sample
- file; help

"Beautiful Day" is a song by Irish rock band U2. It is the first track on their tenth studio album, All That You Can't Leave Behind (2000), and was released as the album's lead single on 9 October 2000. Like many tracks from All That You Can't Leave Behind, "Beautiful Day" harkens back to the group's past sound. The tone of the Edge's guitar was a subject of debate among the band members, as they disagreed on whether he should use a sound similar to that from their early career in the 1980s. The band's lead vocalist Bono explained that the upbeat track is about losing everything but still finding joy in what one has.

"Beautiful Day" received positive reviews from music critics, and it was a commercial success, helping launch the album to multi-platinum status. The song became the band's 14th number-one single on the Irish Singles Chart. Outside Ireland, "Beautiful Day" topped the charts in Australia, Canada, Finland, Italy, the Netherlands, Norway, Portugal, Spain and the United Kingdom, and peaked within the top ten of the charts in Austria, Belgium, Germany, New Zealand, Sweden and Switzerland. "Beautiful Day" also peaked at number 21 on the Billboard Hot 100 in the United States, the band's highest position since "Discothèque" in 1997.

In 2001, the song won three Grammy Awards for Song of the Year, Record of the Year, and Best Rock Performance by a Duo or Group with Vocal at the 43rd Annual Grammy Awards ceremony. The group has played "Beautiful Day" at every one of their concerts since the song's live debut on the Elevation Tour in 2001.

== Writing and recording ==
"Beautiful Day" originated from recording sessions held by U2 in a small room at Hanover Quay Studio in Dublin in the winter of 1999. In its earliest permutation, "Beautiful Day" was a different song called "Always", which was later released as a B-side. The song's genesis came from a chord sequence that lead vocalist Bono composed and that guitarist the Edge subsequently adapted. The group worked on the song for several days in the studio, but were unable to make much progress with it. The Edge said, "As a straight rock song, it was pretty ho-hum." Co-producer Daniel Lanois said: "the sound of it was a bit stuck in the barroom, and as usual our expectations were high. We wanted to feel the future and not just the past."

Co-producer Brian Eno was frustrated with the lack of progress on the song, and early one morning, he and Lanois arrived in the studio before U2 to prepare some musical ideas. Eno created a rhythm on a drum machine, over which he added a piano part and synthesised strings. Lanois played a guitar part on a Fender Telecaster that was a third above the root of the Edge's guitar sequence, providing what he described as a "choral quality, like harmony singing". The producers' ideas proved to be musically inspiring to the band when they arrived and resumed work on the song. Lanois described the Edge's resulting guitar playing as "sounding like shattered, splintered metal coming at you like a meteor storm". Near the end of a 20-minute jam of the song, Bono sang, "It's a beautiful day, don't let it get away". After taking a lunch break, the producers thought that Bono's impromptu vocal from the outro could be made into the song's chorus. They quickly edited the vocal part into earlier sections of the jam, turning it into what would be the chorus of "Beautiful Day".

Before leaving the studio one day, the Edge listened to the chorus vocals, and thinking they sounded bare, he picked up a microphone and improvised a backing vocal, singing a high fifth. At the same time, Lanois harmonised a lower doo-wop style vocal that he described as similar to those in "The Lion Sleeps Tonight". Their voices were then doubled and processed by Eno. The Edge called the backing vocals a "beautiful counterpoint" to Bono's singing and "the final key element that the song needed".

During the recording process for the All That You Can't Leave Behind album, the band decided to distance themselves from their 1990s experimentation with electronic dance music in favour of a "return to the traditional U2 sound". At the same time, the band was looking for a more forward looking sound. This led to debate amongst the band when the Edge was playing the song on his Gibson Explorer guitar with a tone used in much of their early material up to their 1983 album War. Bono was particularly resistant to the guitar tone the Edge was playing with, but the Edge ultimately won the disagreement. As he explained, "It was because we were coming up with some innovative music that I felt a license to use some signature guitar sounds."

The mixing process proved difficult, lasting two weeks. Long-time U2 producer Steve Lillywhite was hired to help complete the final mix. Several changes were made during this period; Bono added a guitar part that played the song's chord progression to double the bass, an addition that "solidified everything", according to the Edge. The Edge also changed the bass line in the chorus and converted a keyboard idea of Bono's into a guitar part that added a "sour quality" to balance the track's positivity. Lanois described the completed song as "one of those little gifts where you think, my god, we've got it!"

== Composition ==
"Beautiful Day" is played at a tempo of 136 beats per minute in a 4/4 time signature. The song opens with a reverberating electric piano playing over a string synthesiser, introducing the chord progression of A–Bm_{7}–D–G–D_{9}–A. This progression continues throughout the verses and chorus, the changes not always one to a bar. After the opening line, "The heart is a bloom", the rhythm enters, comprising repeated eighth notes on bass guitar and a drum machine. In the first verse, Bono's vocals are in the front of the mix and their production is dry. At 0:29, a guitar arpeggio pattern by the Edge first appears, echoing across channels. The verses are relatively quiet until the chorus, when the Edge begins playing the song's guitar riff and Larry Mullen's drums enter. During the chorus, Bono sings in a restrained manner, contrasting with the Edge's "loud, bellowing" background vocals, a sustained cry of "day".

After the second chorus, a bridge section begins at 1:55, playing the chord progression F♯m–G–D–A, heightening the track's emotion as Bono sings "Touch me / Take me to that other place". The bridge links to the middle eight with a section in which the Edge repeats a modulated two note phrase on guitar, beginning at 2:08. After seven seconds, the rhythm breaks and the middle eight begins. The chords in this section follow a progression of Em–D–Em–G–D–Em–G–D–A, implying a key of D major. The bass plays a G note beneath the Em chord, implying a chord change does not occur. The lyrics for this section are set in space above Earth and describe the sights that one witnesses, including China, the Grand Canyon, tuna fleets, and Bedouin fires. After the third chorus and a return of the bridge section, the song suddenly ends in a "low-key" fashion; most of the instrumentation stops and a regeneration of a guitar signal drifts back and forth between channels before fading out.

According to Bono, "Beautiful Day" is about "a man who has lost everything, but finds joy in what he still has." Blender interpreted the song and the line "it's a beautiful day" as "a vision of abandoning material things and finding grace in the world itself". In his 2001 book Inside Classic Rock Tracks, Rikki Rooksby described the lyrics as having a "fuzzy" quality and covering an "ambiguous subject area between religion and romance". He found "grace and salvation" in the verses' lyrics and believed that despite not explicitly explaining how to emotionally persevere, the song has "so many suggestive images that it's enough".

Simon Reynolds of Uncut characterises the song as "Boy's wide-eyed ardour filtered through Unforgettable Fire's tingly shimmerscape production", with Edge's echoing "Echoplex chimes", but that despite the deceptively simple composition, "the production teems with subtle flickers, dub-wise backwash whooshes, and vocal harmony embellishments. Tom Ewing of Freaky Trigger compares the ripple of keyboard in the middle-eight section to William Orbit.

In a 2005 episode of the Sundance Channel's Iconoclasts, R.E.M.'s lead singer Michael Stipe said, "I love that song. I wish I'd written it, and they know I wish I'd written it. It makes me dance; it makes me angry that I didn't write it."

In a 2000 interview with the Norwegian newspaper Dagbladet, following speculation in Q, the Edge stated that the song was in part unconsciously inspired by the 1985 a-ha song "The Sun Always Shines on T.V.". Morten Harket, lead singer of a-ha, said in an interview with NME that the similarity was "fine" and "natural".

== Release ==
"Beautiful Day" was the first single released from the album All That You Can't Leave Behind. It was serviced to US rock radio on 19 September 2000 and was issued in the UK on 9 October 2000 as a CD and cassette single. The following day, on 10 October, the single was issued in Canada. The song reached number one on the singles charts in Australia, Canada, on the United Kingdom Singles Chart and the Irish Singles Chart, and also boosted sales of All That You Can't Leave Behind. "Beautiful Day" is included on the compilations The Best of 1990–2000 (2002) and U218 Singles (2006) and was reworked and re-recorded for Songs of Surrender (2023). A version of the song known as the Quincy and Sonance Mix appears on U2's 2002 EP 7.

== Music video ==
The song's video was directed by Jonas Åkerlund and filmed in August 2000. It depicts the band walking around in Paris' Charles de Gaulle Airport (where the photographs for All That You Can't Leave Behind were taken), with scenes of the band playing in a hangar, at the terminal, and on a runway interspliced with large jets taking off and landing overhead.

An alternative video for the song, shot in Èze, France, was featured on U2 Exclusive CD!, the bonus DVD from The Best of 1990–2000, and the U218 Videos DVD. A month before the album release, a live version of the song was filmed in Dublin on the rooftop of The Clarence Hotel. It is featured on the extra features of the Elevation 2001: Live from Boston DVD (although it is marked on the DVD as "Toronto, Canada").

== Live performances ==
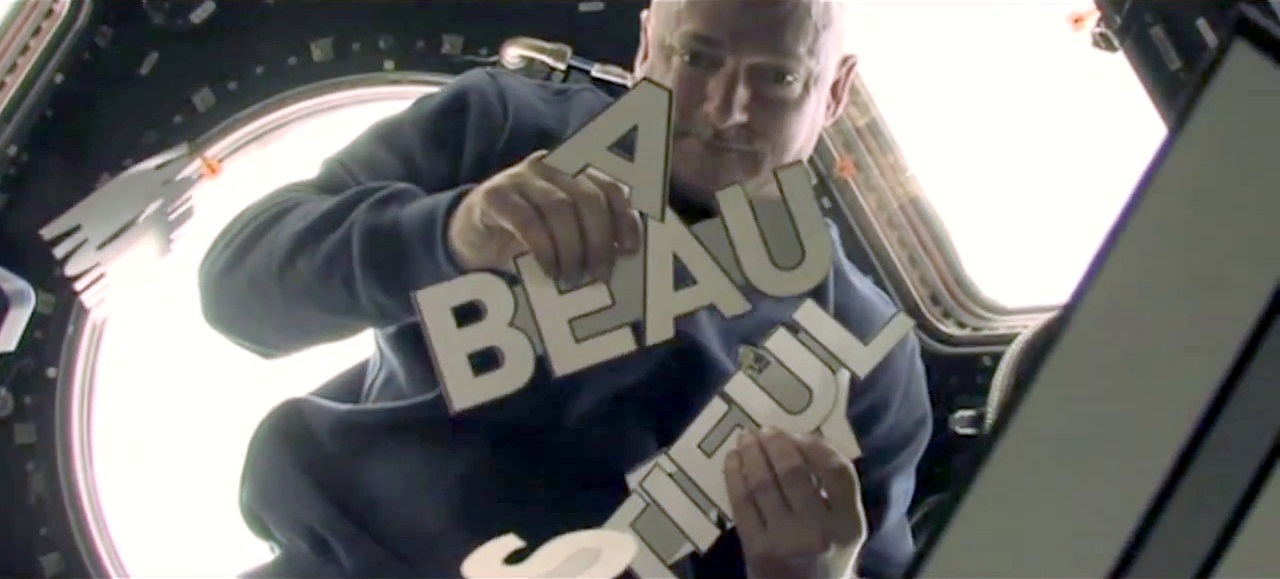
A video of astronaut Mark Kelly was featured prior to the song at concerts on the final leg of the U2 360° Tour.

Ever since its tour debut at the first date of the Elevation Tour on 24 March 2001 in Miami, "Beautiful Day" has been played at every single full tour concert as well as a number of promotional appearances and concerts not connected with a tour. On the Elevation Tour, "Beautiful Day" was normally the second song played, though it did open one show, and was played late in the set list at two concerts. During the 2005-2006 Vertigo Tour, it appeared in the first half of the main set.

On the 2009-2011 U2 360° Tour it typically appeared early in the main set, it also opened some concerts in the early 2011 shows. For the final leg of the tour it was moved back to the midpoint of the show and featured a pre-recorded video of astronaut Mark Kelly. Kelly had previously chosen the song for a wake up call on the 2011 Space Shuttle flight STS-134. On the 2015 Innocence + Experience Tour it either appeared late in the main set or during the encore.

During The Joshua Tree Tour 2017 "Beautiful Day" would often open the encore. Performances on this tour featured an extended introduction leading into the start of the song, and the bridge was extended with synth like voices in the background. Performances on the 2019 leg of the tour were similar. For the 2018 Experience + Innocence Tour, the song was moved towards the beginning of the show, initially the same extended introduction was used as on The Joshua Tree Tours 2017 and 2019, however this was dropped after a few shows.

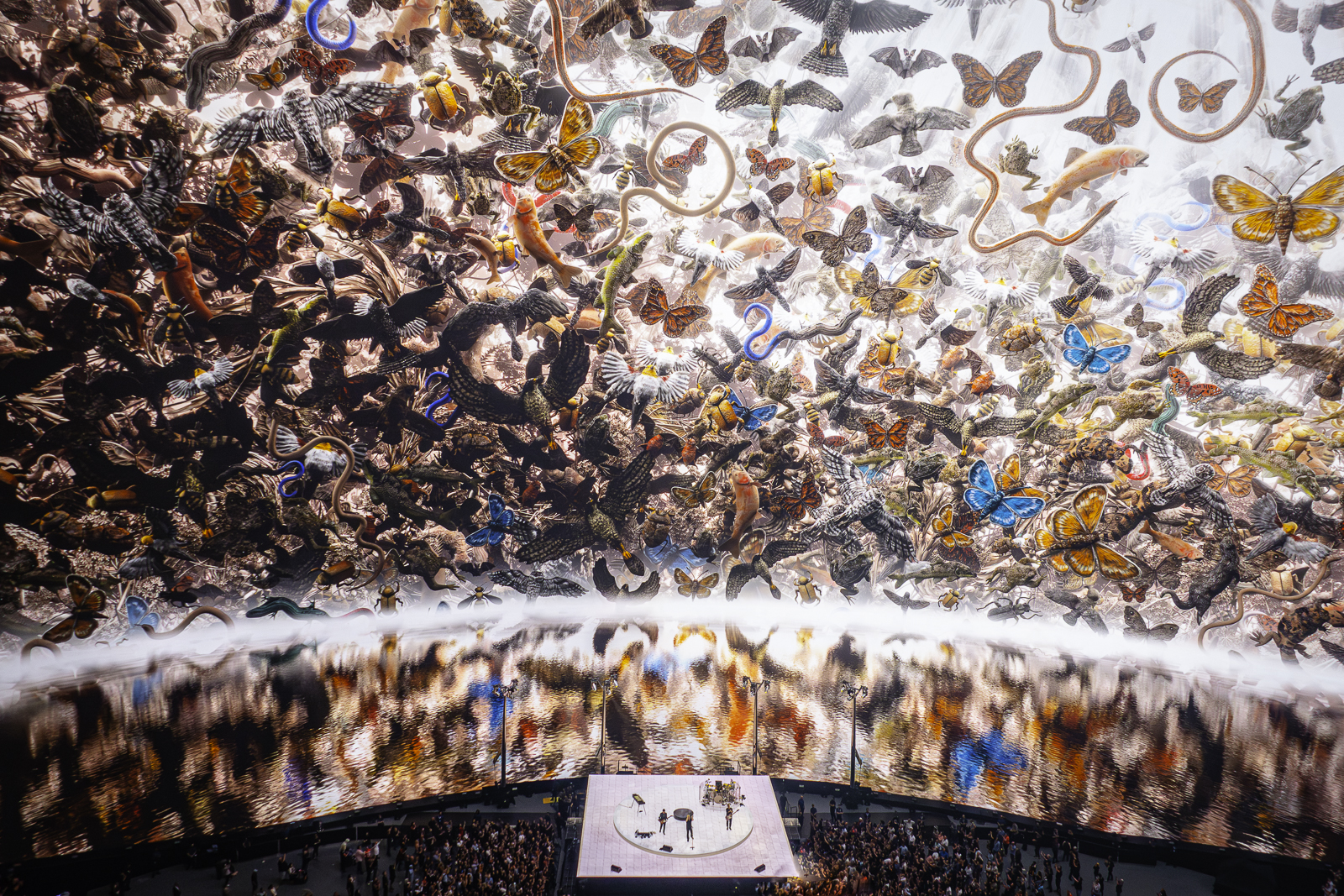
Performances of the song during U2's 2023–2024 concert residency at the Sphere featured artwork of the endangered species of Nevada.

U2 performed "Beautiful Day" as the closing song during their 2023–2024 concert residency, U2:UV Achtung Baby Live, at Sphere in the Las Vegas Valley. During performances, the venue's LED screen displayed video artwork by Es Devlin called "Nevada Ark". It is based on her 2022 art installation Come Home Again at Tate Modern, for which she drew 243 of London's endangered species. After seeing the piece, Bono contacted her and asked if she would adapt it for U2's residency in Nevada; the result was a sequence featuring 26 of the state's endangered species. The artwork first displayed on screen in sepia tones during the previous song "With or Without You", which Bob Gendron said in the Chicago Tribune was "reminiscent of a fresco ceiling in an old cathedral". During "Beautiful Day", the images of the animals progressively transitioned into full colour.

It is featured on the live films Elevation 2001: Live from Boston, U2 Go Home: Live from Slane Castle, Ireland (2003), and Vertigo 2005: Live from Chicago. The song was also performed on stage during U2's set at the 2005 Live 8 concert in Hyde Park in London, with slightly different lyrics in the bridge that mentioned the different cities where the Live 8 concerts took place.

It was performed live in New Orleans for Super Bowl XXXVI in 2002 and for the New Orleans Saints first game in New Orleans since Hurricane Katrina. During the band's five-night stand on the Late Show with David Letterman to promote their album No Line on the Horizon in March 2009, "Beautiful Day" was the only song not from that album that was played.

== Critical reception ==
"Beautiful Day" received mostly positive reviews from critics. Olaf Tyaransen of Hot Press called the song "surprisingly straightforward but still infectiously catchy", while the magazine's Peter Murphy said the track broke the band's trend of releasing lead singles that broke new sonic ground but were not the best songs from their respective albums. Murphy called the song a "patented U2 cavalry charge from U2 3 through The Joshua Tree to Jubilee 2000". The Guardian said the song "strikes an appropriate note of putting the past behind you and getting on with the rest of your life". The review praised the track for its "bustling beat", "contagious chorus and vintage guitar chimes from Edge". Robert Hilburn of the Los Angeles Times called the track proof that the band's music had once again been "graced by the glorious textures of Edge's guitar, and [that] Bono has dropped the masks". Rolling Stone called the song "poised, then pouncing" and said it was one of many from the album that has a "resonance that doesn't fade with repeated listening". The Philadelphia Inquirer was critical of the song, saying it was not "driven by the fire of true believers", but rather by the band's need for a hit, and that it was "a move to solidify a base that may already have slipped away".

David Browne of Entertainment Weekly was very receptive to "Beautiful Day", noting that the chorus "erupts into a euphoric bellow so uplifting" that it was played during a television broadcast of the 2000 Summer Olympics. Browne called the "classic U2 arrangement" of the song "corny", but said, "damn if it isn't effective". He said the song made him reminiscent of the band's glory days in the late 1980s when so much popular music sought to be "sonically and emotionally uplifting". Edna Gundersen of USA Today was enthusiastic about the song, calling it "euphoric" and suggesting it was "breathing fresh air into playlists choking on synthetic pop and seething rap-rock". The Detroit Free Press was critical of the album for being pedestrian but called "Beautiful Day" one of the album's "flashes of triumph", describing it as "a gloriously busy, layered song that recalls Bono's lyrically astute Achtung Baby days". NME published a negative review of the song after its single release that suggested John Lennon's assassin, Mark David Chapman, should be released from prison to shoot Bono, a statement that Hot Press called "poisonous" and "tasteless". The publication was more receptive to the song after the release of All That You Can't Leave Behind, saying the album "eas[es] in with the heat-hazy optimism" of the track.

=== Accolades and legacy ===
"Beautiful Day" finished in fourth place on the "Best Singles" list from The Village Voice's 2000 Pazz & Jop critics' poll. The song won three Grammy Awards at the 43rd Annual Grammy Awards in 2001—Record of the Year, Song of the Year, and Best Rock Performance by a Duo or Group with Vocal. In 2003, a special edition issue of Q, titled "1001 Best Songs Ever", placed "Beautiful Day" at number 747 on its list of the greatest songs. In 2005, Blender ranked the song at number 63 on its list of "The 500 Greatest Songs Since You Were Born". The Labour Party subsequently made extensive use of the song during its successful re-election campaign in 2005, though an unresolved dispute with and within the band prevented it being used in party political broadcasts. In 2009, in an end of decade rankings list, Rolling Stone listed "Beautiful Day" as the ninth-best song and readers ranked it as the third-best single for the decade of the 2000s. In 2010, Rolling Stone updated its list of "The 500 Greatest Songs of All Time" and placed "Beautiful Day" at number 345, making it one of eight U2 songs on the list. In 2011, VH1 listed "Beautiful Day" at number 15 on its list of The 100 Greatest Songs of '00s. Rolling Stone's 2018 list of the "100 Greatest Songs of the Century – So Far" ranked the song 40th.

A version of the song was used as the theme tune to the ITV football highlights television shows The Premiership broadcast from 2001 to 2004 and The Championship from 2004 to 2009. Kurt Nilsen, the Norwegian Idol winner sang it during the World Idol competition on 25 December 2003 and won the competition with the song. This was the only World Idol title and was not repeated in consequent years.

In 2004, Sanctus Real recorded a version on the album In the Name of Love: Artists United for Africa. In 2007, the German guitarist Axel Rudi Pell recorded his version on his album Diamonds Unlocked. In 2008, the song was chosen to play over the end titles of the children's film Nim's Island, starring Abigail Breslin, Jodie Foster and Gerard Butler. The song was also played after John Kerry gave his acceptance speech at the 2004 Democratic National Convention in July 2004.

The song was used by Barack Obama's 2008 and 2012 presidential campaigns, together with the band's song "City of Blinding Lights". In 2020, Obama listed "Beautiful Day" in a playlist of "memorable songs" from his presidency.

In 2010, a cover of "Beautiful Day" was released by Lee DeWyze as his first single following his victory in the ninth season of American Idol. DeWyze commented "I like that song a lot (...) Is it something that is necessarily in my genre? No. There were songs on the table, and I went with the one I thought would represent the moment the best." The cover reached number 24 on the US Billboard Hot 100 and number 13 on the Canadian Hot 100. "Beautiful Day" was also covered by 2010 X Factor Australia season 2 winner Altiyan Childs for his self-titled debut album. For the band's 2023 album Songs of Surrender, U2 re-recorded the song with alternate lyrics during the bridge.

== Formats and track listings ==
All music is composed by U2.

12-inch vinyl
No.	Title	Length
1.	"Beautiful Day"	4:06
2.	"Beautiful Day"	4:06
Total length:		8:12

UK cassette
No.	Title	Length
1.	"Beautiful Day"	4:06
2.	"Summer Rain"	4:06
Total length:		8:12

CD 1
No.	Title	Length
1.	"Beautiful Day"	4:06
2.	"Summer Rain"	4:06
3.	"Always"	3:46
Total length:		11:58

CD 2
No.	Title	Length
1.	"Beautiful Day"	4:06
2.	"Discothèque" (Live in Foro Sol, Mexico City, Mexico, 3 December 1997)	5:10
3.	"If You Wear That Velvet Dress" (Live in Foro Sol, Mexico City, Mexico, 3 December 1997)	2:43
Total length:		11:59

Australian CD 1
No.	Title	Length
1.	"Beautiful Day"	4:06
2.	"Summer Rain"	4:06
3.	"Always"	3:46
4.	"Last Night on Earth" (Live in Foro Sol, Mexico City, Mexico, 3 December 1997 – video version)	6:30
Total length:		18:28

Australian CD 2
No.	Title	Length
1.	"Beautiful Day"	4:06
2.	"Discothèque" (Live in Foro Sol, Mexico City, Mexico, 3 December 1997)	5:10
3.	"If You Wear That Velvet Dress" (Live in Foro Sol, Mexico City, Mexico, 3 December 1997)	2:43
4.	"Last Night on Earth" (Live in Foro Sol, Mexico City, Mexico, 3 December 1997)	6:30
Total length:		18:29

Japan CD
No.	Title	Length
1.	"Beautiful Day"	4:06
2.	"Summer Rain"	4:06
3.	"Always"	3:46
4.	"Discothèque" (Live in Foro Sol, Mexico City, Mexico, 3 December 1997)	5:10
5.	"If You Wear That Velvet Dress" (Live in Foro Sol, Mexico City, Mexico, 3 December 1997)	2:43
Total length:		19:53

2024 remastered single
No.	Title	Length
1.	"Beautiful Day"	4:07
2.	"Summer Rain"	4:08
3.	"Always"	3:47
4.	"Discothèque" (Live in Foro Sol, Mexico City, Mexico, 3 December 1997)	5:09
5.	"If You Wear That Velvet Dress" (Live in Foro Sol, Mexico City, Mexico, 3 December 1997)	2:44
6.	"Last Night on Earth" (Live in Foro Sol, Mexico City, Mexico, 3 December 1997)	6:32
7.	"Beautiful Day (Quincey & Sonace Mix)"	7:58
8.	"Beautiful Day (The Perfecto Mix)"	7:50
9.	"Beautiful Day (David Holmes remix)"	5:34
Total length:		47:49

== Personnel ==
U2

- Bono – lead vocals
- The Edge – guitar, backing vocals
- Adam Clayton – bass guitar
- Larry Mullen, Jr. – drums

Additional performers

- Brian Eno – synthesizers, programming
- Daniel Lanois – backing vocals

== Charts ==
=== Weekly charts ===
2000–2001 weekly chart performance for "Beautiful Day"
Chart (2000–2001)	Peak position
Australia (ARIA)	1
Austria (Ö3 Austria Top 40)	7
Belgium (Ultratop 50 Flanders)	8
Belgium (Ultratop 50 Wallonia)	6
Canada Top Singles (RPM)	15 (Note: "Beautiful Day" reached number 15 when RPM ceased publication in November 2000.)
Canada Adult Contemporary (RPM)	56 (Note: "Beautiful Day" reached number 56 when RPM ceased publication in November 2000.)
Canada Rock/Alternative (RPM)	1
Canada (Nielsen SoundScan)	1
Croatia (HRT)	2
Denmark (IFPI)	2
Europe (Eurochart Hot 100)	1
Finland (Suomen virallinen lista)	1
France (SNEP)	17
Germany (GfK)	7
Greece (IFPI)	3
Hungary (Mahasz)	2
Iceland (Íslenski Listinn Topp 40)	2
Ireland (IRMA)	1
Italy (FIMI)	1
Italy Airplay (Music & Media)	2
Netherlands (Dutch Top 40)	1
Netherlands (Single Top 100)	1
New Zealand (Recorded Music NZ)	7
Norway (VG-lista)	1
Portugal (AFP)	1
Scottish Singles Sales (Official Charts)	1
Spain (Promusicae)	1
Sweden (Sverigetopplistan)	7
Switzerland (Schweizer Hitparade)	6
UK Singles (Official Charts)	1
US Billboard Hot 100	21
US Adult Alternative Airplay (Billboard)	1
US Adult Pop Airplay (Billboard)	4
US Alternative Airplay (Billboard)	5
US Dance Club Songs (Billboard)	1
US Mainstream Rock (Billboard)	14
US Pop Airplay (Billboard)	19

2025 weekly chart performance for "Beautiful Day"
Chart (2025)	Peak position
Russia Streaming (TopHit)	100

=== Year-end charts ===
2000 year-end chart performance for "Beautiful Day"
Chart (2000)	Position
Australia (ARIA)	54
Brazil (Crowley)	83
Denmark (IFPI)	37
Europe (Eurochart Hot 100)	67
Iceland (Íslenski Listinn Topp 40)	48
Ireland (IRMA)	33
Netherlands (Dutch Top 40)	24
Netherlands (Single Top 100)	35
Spain (AFYVE)	2
Switzerland (Schweizer Hitparade)	85
UK Singles (OCC)	103
US Adult Top 40 (Billboard)	83
US Mainstream Rock Tracks (Billboard)	63
US Modern Rock Tracks (Billboard)	48
US Triple-A (Billboard)	21

2001 year-end chart performance for "Beautiful Day"
Chart (2001)	Position
Canada Radio (Nielsen BDS)	40
Canada (Nielsen SoundScan)	53
Canada (Nielsen SoundScan) Single 2	123
US Billboard Hot 100	75
US Adult Top 40 (Billboard)	14
US Dance Club Play (Billboard)	21
US Mainstream Top 40 (Billboard)	79
US Modern Rock Tracks (Billboard)	50
US Triple-A (Billboard)	9

== Certifications ==
Certifications for "Beautiful Day"
Region	Certification	Certified units/sales
Australia (ARIA)	Platinum	70,000^{^}
Brazil (Pro-Música Brasil) DMS	Platinum	60,000^{*}
Brazil (Pro-Música Brasil) Digital	Gold	30,000^{‡}
Denmark (IFPI Danmark)	Gold	45,000^{‡}
Germany (BVMI)	Gold	250,000^{‡}
Italy (FIMI)	Platinum	50,000^{‡}
New Zealand (RMNZ)	3× Platinum	90,000^{‡}
Spain (Promusicae)	Gold	25,000^{^}
Spain (Promusicae) Sales since 2015	Platinum	60,000^{‡}
United Kingdom (BPI)	2× Platinum	1,200,000^{‡}
United States (RIAA)	Gold	500,000^{*}
^{*} Sales figures based on certification alone.^{^} Shipments figures based on certification alone.^{‡} Sales+streaming figures based on certification alone.

== Release history ==
Release dates and formats for "Beautiful Day"
Region	Date	Format(s)	Label(s)	Ref(s).
United States	19 September 2000	Mainstream rock; active rock; alternative radio	Interscope	
Australia	9 October 2000	CD	Island	
Europe	9 October 2000	CD	Island	
United Kingdom	9 October 2000	CD; cassette	Island	
Canada	10 October 2000	CD	Island	
United States	16 October 2000	Hot adult contemporary radio	Interscope	
Japan	18 October 2000	CD	Island	
United States	24 October 2000	12-inch vinyl	Interscope	
United States	31 October 2000	Contemporary hit radio	Interscope	

== See also ==
- List of covers of U2 songs – Beautiful Day
- List of number-one singles in Australia in 2000
- List of RPM Rock/Alternative number-one singles (Canada)
- Dutch Top 40 number-one hits of 2000
- List of number-one singles of 2000 (Ireland)
- List of number-one hits of 2000 (Italy)
- List of number-one singles of 2000 (Spain)
- List of number-one singles from the 2000s (UK)
- List of number-one dance singles of 2001 (U.S.)
