= Haslett (surname) =

Haslett is a surname. Notable people with the surname include:

- Adam Haslett (born 1970), American fiction writer
- Alexander Haslett (1883–1951), Irish independent politician
- Caroline Haslett (1895–1957), British electrical engineer and electricity industry administrator
- Jim Haslett (born 1955), American football coach and former player
- John F. Haslett, 21st century American writer
