= Max & Bianca =

Australian pop duo

- Origin: Sydney, New South Wales, Australia
- Genres: Pop
- Years active: 2011–2015
- Label: Wonderlick/Sony
- Past members: Max Donovan; Bianca Oechsle

Max & Bianca were an Australian pop duo formed by Max Donovan and Bianca Oechsle in 2011. Their debut single, "Love Drunk" (December 2013), reached the ARIA Singles Chart top 100. They disbanded late in 2015.

== History ==
Max Donovan and Bianca Oechsle met at a Talent Development Project for students in Sydney. They formed a pop duo sharing lead vocals. The pair were signed to Wonderlick Recordings/Sony. In January 2014 their debut single, "Love Drunk" (December 2013), reached No. 92 on the ARIA singles chart. The song was co-written by Donovan and Oechsle with Anthony Egizii and David Musumeci (p.k.a. DNA Songs). The music video for "Love Drunk" was filmed at Larnach Castle in Dunedin and produced by Benn Jae.

Idolator's Mike Wass observed, "Brought together by mutual friends, the Sydney-based duo play their own instruments and aspire to make quality pop music with substance... the fizzy pop tune sounds like a more melodic Karmin — with sugary sweet vocals and a bold, sing-a-long chorus." Andrew Le of Renowned for Sound, rated it at three-and-a-half out-of five stars and explained, "production is nevertheless disposable and generic. The opening guitar strums are reminiscent of the intro to P!nk’s Raise Your Glass, and [their] voices are heavily processed and sanitized... [it] has an actual song structure, with verses, a pre-chorus that builds to the big chorus, hooks and a bridge... [they] sound great together, whether singing individually or together (with and without harmonising)." In October 2015 the duo performed a live version of "Love Drunk" in the studios of The Music Network.

Max & Bianca followed with a second single, "Young and Broken", in April 2015. It was co-written by the pair with Xavier Dunn. auspOp's Damian Ormerod observed, "[it's] a thumping, punch dance/pop number that ought to win them a slew of new fans across the country with its fab harmonies and stomping dance beats." They were featured singers on "Into the Light" by G-Wizard, which appeared in October of that year and reached No.26 on the ARIA Club Tracks Chart. In late 2015 the duo split, with Oechsle going on to form a new group, Kalide, with DJ Mike Smith.

== Members ==
- Max Donovan
- Bianca Oechsle

== Discography ==
- "Love Drunk" (13 December 2013) – Wonderlick Recordings/Sony Music Entertainment Australia AUS: No. 92
- "Young and Broken" (30 April 2015)
  - "Young and Broken" (G-Wizard Remix) (27 March 2015) – Sony Music Entertainment Australia
- "Into the Light" (by G-Wizard featuring Max & Bianca) (October 2015) AUS Club: No. 26
