= Moscos & Stone =

- Origin: Australia
- Genres: rock
- Years active: 1978–1981
- Label: Image

Moscos & Stone was a short-lived Australian band formed in 1978. The group released two albums, before splitting in 1981.

== Discography ==
=== Studio albums ===
List of albums, with selected details and chart positions
Title	Album details	Peak chart positions
Title	Album details	AUS
Moscos & Stone	Released: August 1979; Format: LP; Label: Image (ILP 809)	54
Memorial Drive – The Story of a Kid That Survived	Released: 1980; Format: LP, cassette; Label: CBS (SBP 237546)	—

=== Singles ===
List of singles, with selected chart positions
Year	Title	Peak chart positions	Album
Year	Title	AUS	Album
1978	"Captain Captain (Empty Horses)"	41	Moscos & Stone
1979	"Trouble in the City"	72	Moscos & Stone
1979	"Song for You"	58	Moscos & Stone
1980	"Over and Over"	—	Non-album single
1980	"Secrets"	—	Memorial Drive – The Story of a Kid That Survived
