= The X Factor (Australian TV series) season 2 =

The X Factor
- Season 2
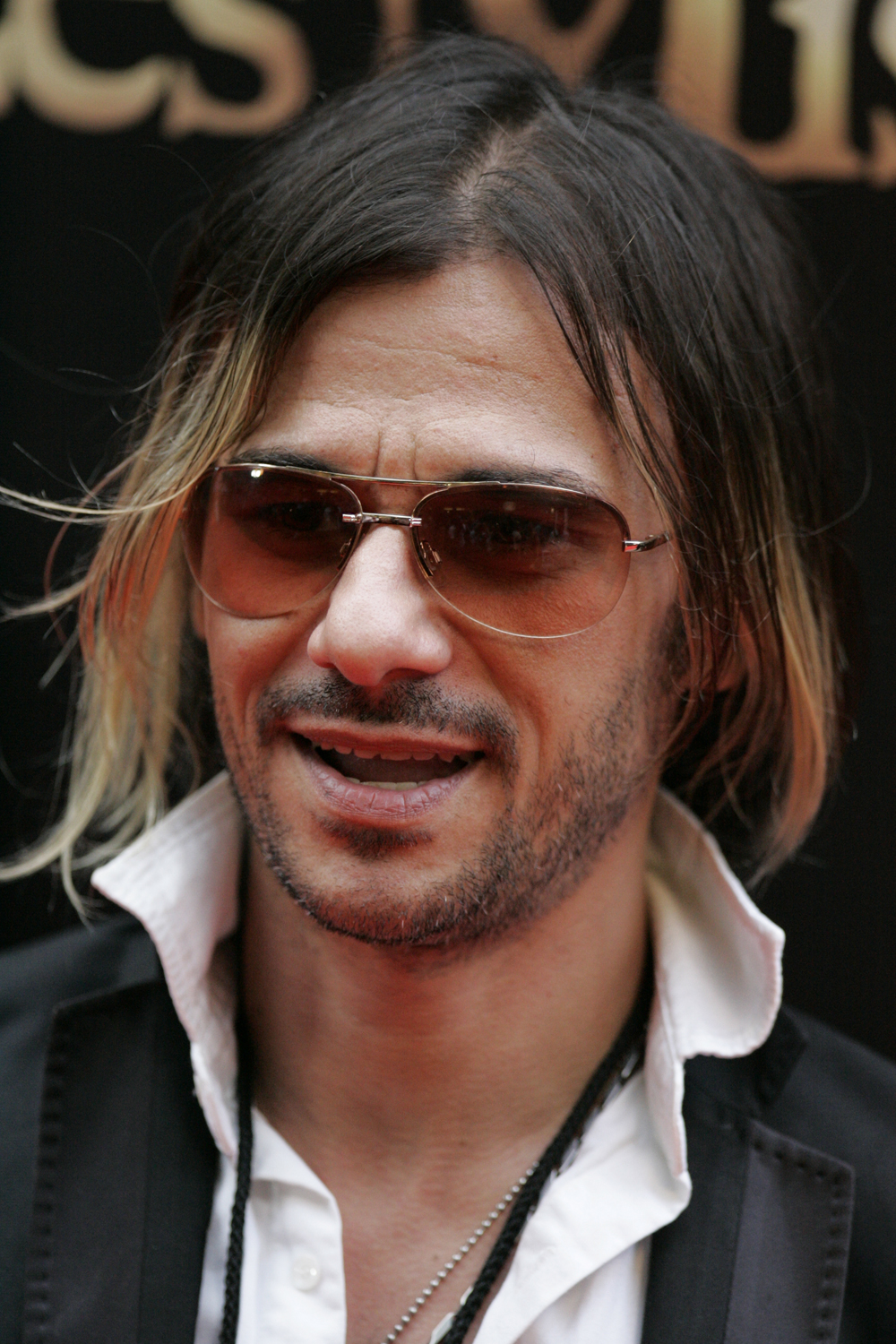
- Hosted by: Luke Jacobz; Natalie Garonzi
- Judges: Kyle Sandilands; Guy Sebastian; Natalie Imbruglia; Ronan Keating
- Winner: Altiyan Childs
- Winning mentor: Ronan Keating
- Runner-up: Sally Chatfield

Release
- Original network: Seven Network
- Original release: 30 August – 22 November 2010

Season chronology
- ← Previous; Season 1 Next → Season 3

The X Factor is an Australian television reality music competition, based on the original UK series, to find new singing talent; the winner of which received a recording contract with record label Sony Music Australia. The second season premiered on the Seven Network on 30 August 2010 and ended on 22 November 2010. The winner was Altiyan Childs and his debut single "Somewhere in the World" was released after the final. Childs was mentored throughout by Ronan Keating, who won as mentor for the first time. The season was presented by Luke Jacobz, while spin-off show The Xtra Factor was hosted by Natalie Garonzi on 7Two. The show was originally to be hosted by actor Matthew Newton, however, he was forced to withdraw as host during production after an altercation with his former girlfriend Rachael Taylor and re-admitting himself to rehab. Guy Sebastian, Natalie Imbruglia, Keating and Kyle Sandilands who is the additional fourth judge joined the judging panel as replacements for former judges, Mark Holden, Kate Ceberano and John Reid.

The competition was split into several stages: auditions, bootcamp, judges' houses and live shows. Auditions took place throughout May and June 2010. After the auditions was bootcamp, where successful acts were split into four categories: Boys, Girls, Over 25s and Groups. Each judge was given a category to mentor and had to decide on their twelve acts after day two, and their six acts after day two. Special guest judges, including Havana Brown, Rebecca Batties, Mark Plunkett and Rai Thistlethwayte were brought in to help the judges decide their acts. Following bootcamp, was the judges' houses stage, where each of the judges reduced their six acts to three, with help from more guest judges, including Kelly Rowland, Sir Richard Branson, Boyzone, Snoop Dogg and Usher. The live shows began on 19 September 2010.

The second season had sparked controversy, including Childs' disappearance from the show and claims of a clash between the Girls. The grand final decider was watched by 1.63 million people, making it the highest rated television episode of the series.

== Background and development ==
Season 2 judges

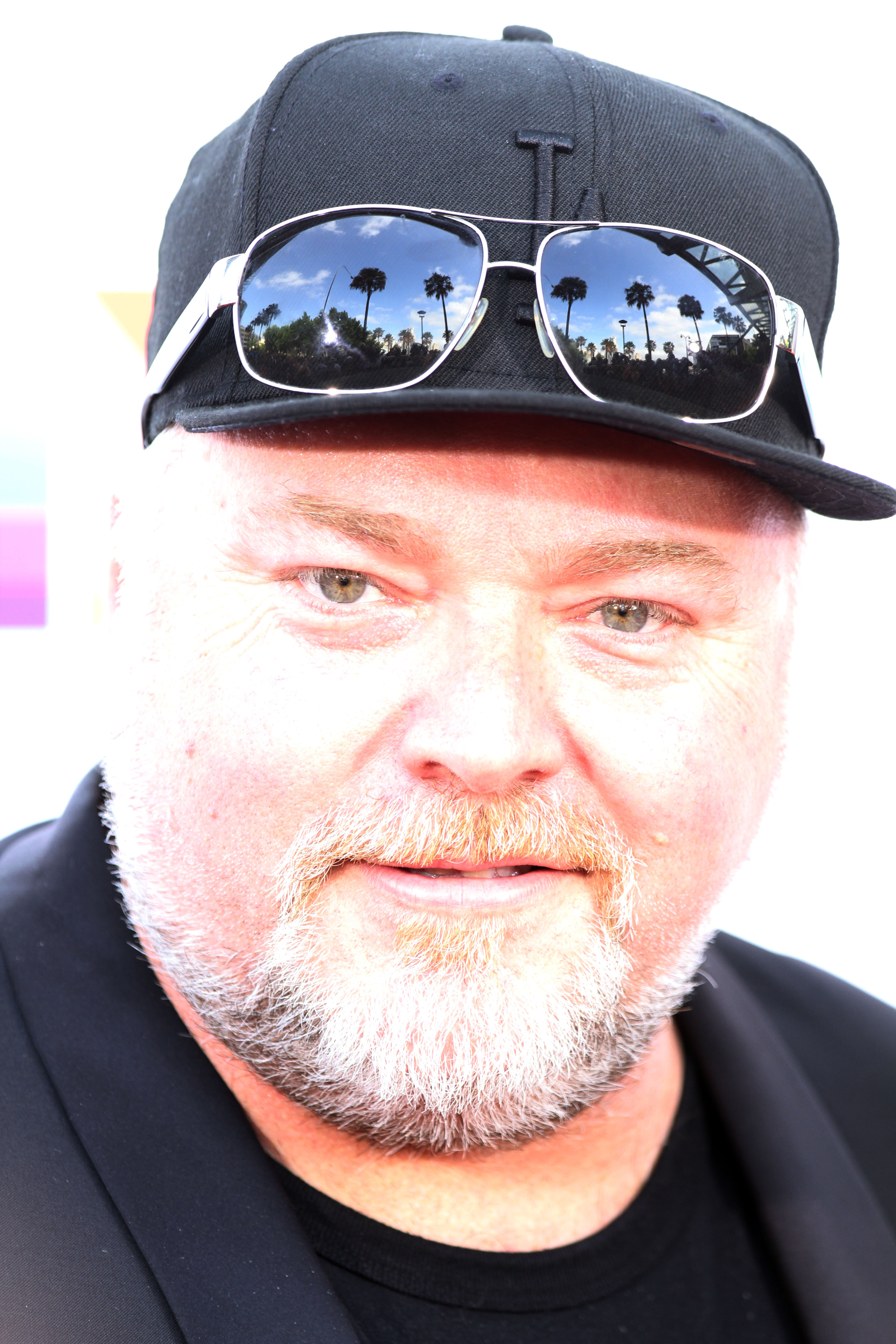
Kyle Sandilands

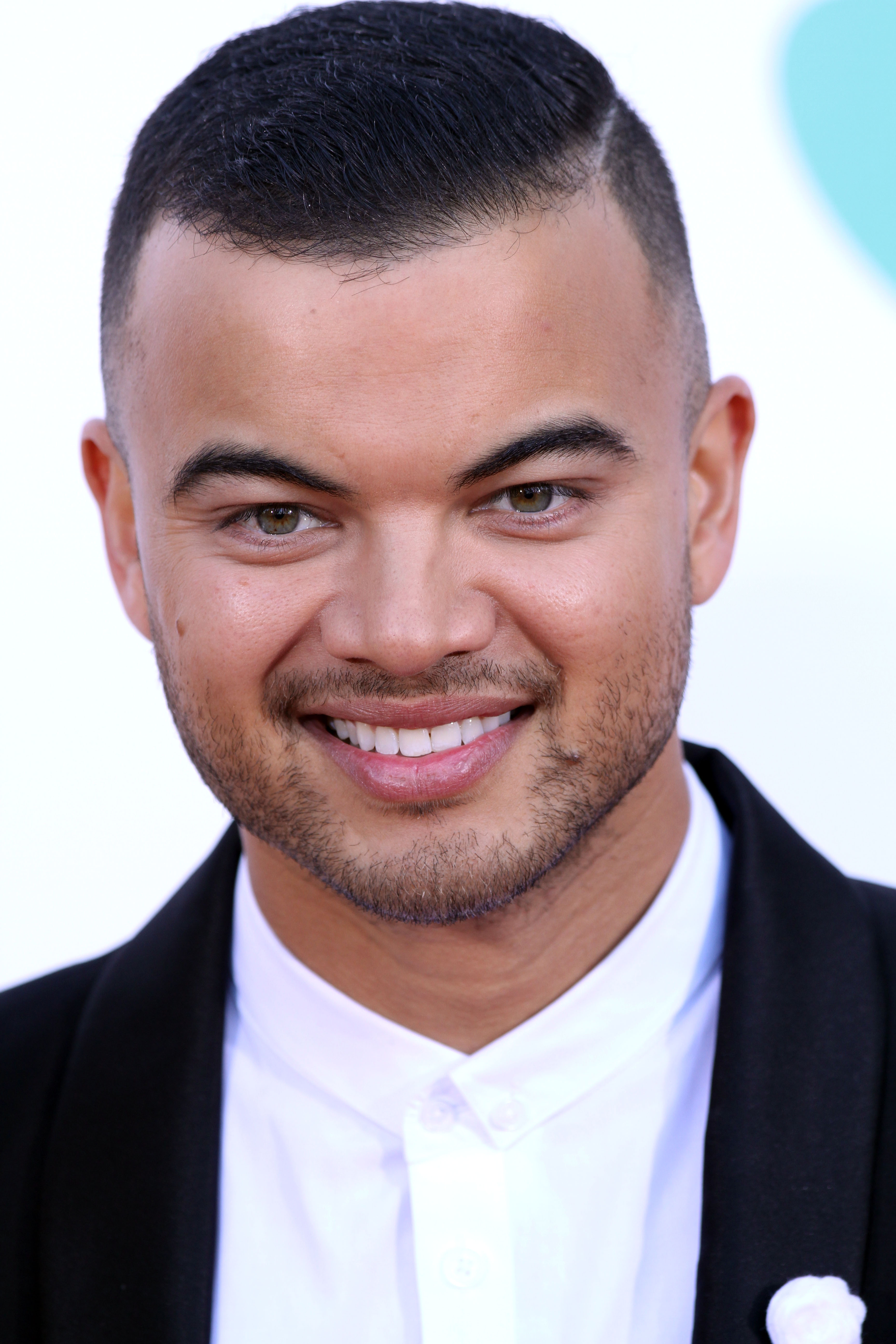
Guy Sebastian

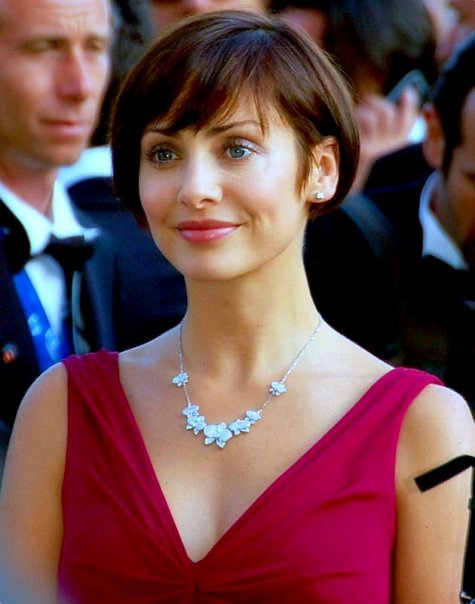
Natalie Imbruglia

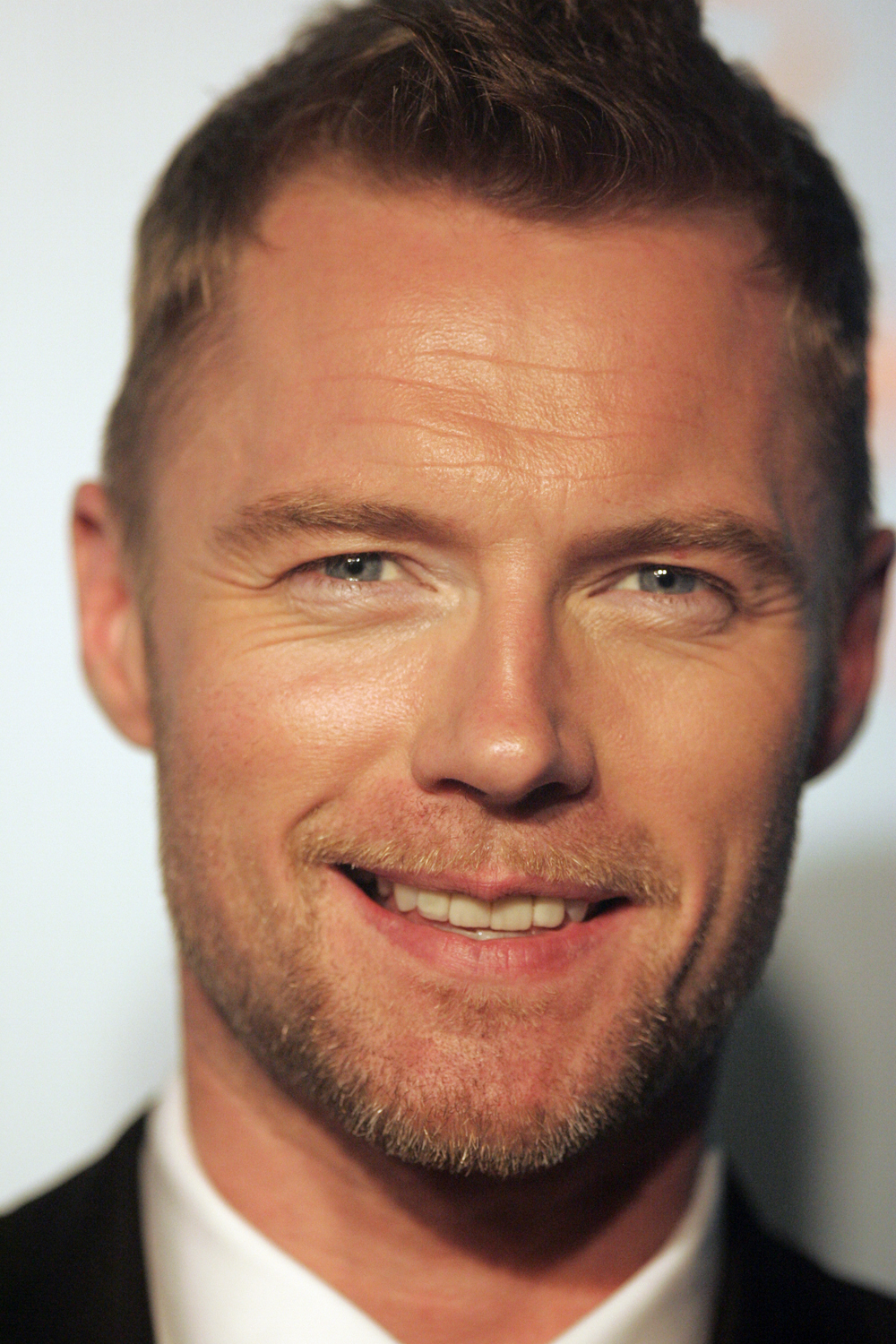
Ronan Keating

On 16 May 2010, it was announced that the Seven Network would relaunch The X Factor with Guy Sebastian, Natalie Imbruglia, Ronan Keating and Kyle Sandilands (who is the additional fourth judge) confirmed as the four judges. The X Factor first screened on Network Ten in 2005, but was canceled after the first season due to poor ratings. Seven Network's head of programming, Tim Worner, said the "time was right" to relaunch the show, given Network Ten's decision to cancel Australian Idol. He explained: "We felt that there's no big light event shows around and that this is the best of them ... We've seen what Australia's Got Talent has done in heavy traffic and feel it's the right opportunity for the show."

On 30 May 2010, it was confirmed that actor Matthew Newton would be the host. However, on 22 August, it was revealed that Newton had withdrawn as the host of the show after an altercation in Rome with his now ex-girlfriend Rachael Taylor. Newton flew from Rome to Dublin, where he was to film segments for The X Factor with Keating. However, he was escorted back to Australia by a producer of the show after they decided he was in no state to film. He was then checked into Wentworthville's Northside West Clinic. On 23 August, actor Luke Jacobz announced that he would take over as host and all original audition footage with Newton was removed with footage of Jacobz being shot instead. On 28 August 2010, it was announced that radio presenter Natalie Garonzi would host the spin-off show The Xtra Factor on 7Two.

== Selection process ==
=== Auditions ===
Audition city	Dates	Venue
Perth	30–31 May 2010	Perth Convention Exhibition Centre
Adelaide	2 June 2010	Adelaide Entertainment Centre
Melbourne	5–7 June 2010	Caulfield Racecourse
Sydney	12–14 June 2010	Australia Technology Park
Brisbane	19–20 June 2010	Suncorp Piazza

=== Bootcamp ===
The bootcamp stage of the competition began on 25 June 2010 in the Big Top at Luna Park, Sydney. This stage of the competition was first broadcast on 5 and 6 September 2010. In this stage, each judge was first given a category to mentor and had to decide on their top twelve acts after day one and their top six acts after day two. Sandilands was given the Boys, Imbruglia was given the Girls, Keating had the Over 25s and Sebastian was given the Groups category.

During bootcamp, the judges were assisted by musical artists who helped them choose their twelve acts. Havana Brown assisted with the Boys, MTV Australia CEO Rebecca Batties assisted with the Girls, Keating's manager Mark Plunkett with the Over 25s and Rai Thistlethwayte for the Groups category.

The 24 successful acts were:

- Boys: Thomas TJ Alcaniz, Darcy Callus, Chris Doe, Andrew Lawson, Mitchell Smith, George Walter
- Girls: Ashlee Bellchambers, Sally Chatfield, Samantha Clarke, India-Rose Madderom, Alice McDermott, Hayley Teal
- Over 25s: Altiyan Childs, Amanda Grafanakis, Max Jahufer, James McNally, Tony Munnings, Olivia Robins
- Groups: Jahmakn It Funky, Kharizma, Lazy J & Big Guy, Luke & Joel, Mahogany, The Real Sisters

=== Judges' Houses ===
The final round of the selection process, the judges' houses, saw the judges reduce their six acts to three. Each judge took their six acts to exclusive locations around the world to experience the life of a superstar, introduce them to international artists and set the stage to inspire them to give the performance of a lifetime. Sandilands' Boys travelled to New York City, where they were assisted by Kelly Rowland. Imbruglia's Girls travelled to Necker Island to meet Richard Branson, while Keating's Over 25s visited his home town of Dublin, where they met up with his Boyzone bandmates. Sebastian's Groups travelled to Los Angeles, where he was assisted by rapper Snoop Dogg. While there, Sebastian had chosen Mahogany as one of his three acts, but was still unsure on who the other two acts should be. Sebastian and the groups then travelled to New York, where he was assisted by Usher.

Summary of judges' houses
Judge	Category	Location	Assistant	Acts Eliminated
Sandilands	Boys	New York City	Kelly Rowland	Thomas TJ Alcaniz, Darcy Callus, George Walter
Imbruglia	Girls	Necker Island	Richard Branson	Ashlee Bellchambers, Samantha Clarke, Alice McDermott
Keating	Over 25s	Dublin	Boyzone	Max Jahufer, Tony Munnings, Olivia Robins
Sebastian	Groups	Los Angeles and New York City	Usher; Snoop Dogg	Jahmakn It Funky, Lazy J & Big Guy, The Real Sisters

== Acts ==
Key:

– Winner
– Runner-up

Act	Age(s)	Hometown	Category (mentor)	Result
Altiyan Childs	35	Mount Isa, Queensland	Over 25s (Keating)	Winner
Sally Chatfield	20	Lakes Entrance, Victoria	Girls (Imbruglia)	Runner-Up
Andrew Lawson	17	Northern Ireland/Noosa	Boys (Sandilands)	3rd Place
Mahogany	22–27	Sydney	Groups (Sebastian)	4th Place
Luke & Joel	21 & 23	Newcastle, New South Wales	Groups (Sebastian)	5th Place
Hayley Teal	19	Adelaide, South Australia	Girls (Imbruglia)	6th Place
India-Rose Madderom	20	Sydney, New South Wales	Girls (Imbruglia)	7th Place
Mitchell Smith	16	Byron Bay, New South Wales	Boys (Sandilands)	8th Place
Amanda Grafanakis	27	Hobart, Tasmania	Over 25s (Keating)	9th Place
Kharizma	18 & 24	Ipswich, Queensland	Groups (Sebastian)	10th Place
James McNally	31	Melbourne	Over 25s (Keating)	11th Place
Chris Doe	17	Mornington Peninsula	Boys (Sandilands)	12th Place

== Live shows ==
=== Results summary ===
Act in Boys

Act in Girls

Act in Over 25s

Act in Groups

– Act in the bottom two and had to perform again in the final showdown
– Act received the fewest public votes and was immediately eliminated (no final showdown)

Act	Week 1	Week 2	Week 3	Week 4	Week 5	Week 6	Week 7	Quarter-Final	Semi-Final	Final	
Act	Week 1	Week 2	Week 3	Week 4	Week 5	Week 6	Week 7	Quarter-Final	Semi-Final	Sunday Vote	Monday Vote
Altiyan Childs	Safe	Safe	Safe	Safe	Safe	Safe	Safe	Safe	Safe	Safe	Winner
Sally Chatfield	Safe	Safe	Safe	Safe	Safe	Safe	Safe	Safe	Safe	Safe	Runner-Up
Andrew Lawson	Safe	Safe	Safe	Safe	Safe	Safe	Safe	Safe	Safe	3rd	Eliminated (Final)
Mahogany	Safe	Safe	10th	Safe	Safe	7th	Safe	4th	4th	Eliminated (Semi-Final)	
Luke and Joel	11th	Safe	Safe	Safe	Safe	Safe	6th	5th	Eliminated (Quarter-Final)		
Hayley Teal	Safe	Safe	Safe	Safe	Safe	Safe	5th	Eliminated (Week 7)			
India-Rose Madderom	Safe	Safe	Safe	9th	7th	6th	Eliminated (Week 6)				
Mitchell Smith	Safe	Safe	Safe	Safe	8th	Eliminated (Week 5)					
Amanda Grafanakis	Safe	10th	Safe	8th	Eliminated (Week 4)						
Kharizma	Safe	Safe	9th	Eliminated (Week 3)							
James McNally	Safe	11th	Eliminated (Week 2)								
Chris Doe	12th	Eliminated (Week 1)									
Final Showdown	Luke and Joel, Doe	Grafanakis, McNally	Kharizma, Mahogany	Madderom, Grafanakis	Smith, Madderom	Madderom, Mahogany	Teal, Luke and Joel	Luke and Joel, Mahogany	No bottom two/judges' vote; public votes alone decide who is eliminated.		
Keating's vote to eliminate (Over 25s)	Doe	Grafanakis	Kharizma	Madderom	Smith	Madderom	Teal	Mahogany	No bottom two/judges' vote; public votes alone decide who is eliminated.		
Imbruglia's vote to eliminate (Girls)	Luke and Joel	McNally	Kharizma	Grafanakis	Smith	Mahogany	Luke and Joel	Luke and Joel	No bottom two/judges' vote; public votes alone decide who is eliminated.		
Sebastian's vote to eliminate (Groups)	Doe	McNally	—N/a^{1}	Grafanakis	Madderom	Madderom	Teal	Mahogany	No bottom two/judges' vote; public votes alone decide who is eliminated.		
Sandilands's vote to eliminate (Boys)	Luke and Joel	Grafanakis	Kharizma	Grafanakis	Madderom^{2}	Madderom	Teal	Luke and Joel	No bottom two/judges' vote; public votes alone decide who is eliminated.		
Eliminated	Chris Doe; 2 of 4 votes Deadlock	James McNally; 2 of 4 votes Deadlock	Kharizma; 3 of 3 votes Majority	Amanda Grafanakis; 3 of 4 votes Majority	Mitchell Smith; 2 of 4 votes Deadlock	India-Rose Madderom; 3 of 4 votes Majority	Hayley Teal; 3 of 4 votes Majority	Luke and Joel; 2 of 4 votes Deadlock	Mahogany; Public Vote To Save	Andrew Lawson; Public Vote To Save	Sally Chatfield; Public Vote To Win

Notes

- ^{1} Sebastian originally was asked to vote, but he deferred his vote to Keating as he "could not send his own act home".
- ^{2} Sandilands was not present for this results. As one of his acts (Mitchell Smith) was in the bottom two, a vote for India-Rose Madderom was cast on Sandilands's behalf on the assumption that he would save his own act.

=== Live show details ===
==== Week 1 (19/20 September) ====
- Theme: Judges' Choice
- Celebrity performers: Thirsty Merc ("All My Life") and The Potbelleez ("Hello")
- Group performance: "In My Head"

Acts' performances on the first live show
Act	Category (mentor)	Order	Song	Result
Luke & Joel	Groups (Sebastian)	1	"Lifestyles of the Rich and Famous"	Bottom Two
Hayley Teal	Girls (Imbruglia)	2	"Bust Your Windows"	Safe
Chris Doe	Boys (Sandilands)	3	"Already Gone"	Bottom Two
Amanda Grafanakis	Over 25s (Keating)	4	"Closer"	Safe
Kharizma	Groups (Sebastian)	5	"Empire State of Mind (Part II) Broken Down"	Safe
Mitchell Smith	Boys (Sandilands)	6	"Umbrella"	Safe
James McNally	Over 25s (Keating)	7	"With a Little Help from My Friends"	Safe
Sally Chatfield	Girls (Imbruglia)	8	"Red"	Safe
Mahogany	Groups (Sebastian)	9	"Whataya Want from Me"	Safe
Andrew Lawson	Boys (Sandilands)	10	"Don't Stop the Music"	Safe
India-Rose Madderom	Girls (Imbruglia)	11	"Battlefield"	Safe
Altiyan Childs	Over 25s (Keating)	12	"Hey, Soul Sister"	Safe
Final showdown details
Act	Category (mentor)	Order	Song	Result
Luke & Joel	Groups (Sebastian)	1	"Fix You"	Safe
Chris Doe	Boys (Sandilands)	2	"Stop and Stare"	Eliminated

Judges' votes to eliminate

- Imbruglia: Luke & Joel – felt that Doe had performed better.
- Keating: Chris Doe – felt that it was too much for Doe that week.
- Sebastian: Chris Doe – backed his own act, Luke & Joel.
- Sandilands: Luke & Joel – backed his own act, Chris Doe.

With the acts in the bottom two receiving two votes each, the result went to deadlock and reverted to the earlier public vote. Doe was eliminated as the act with the fewest public votes.

==== Week 2 (26/27 September) ====
- Theme: Musical Heroes
- Celebrity performers: Justice Crew ("And Then We Dance") and Scarlett Belle ("Freak Tonight")
- Group performance: "Dynamite"

Acts' performances on the second live show
Act	Category (mentor)	Order	Song	Musical Hero	Result
Sally Chatfield	Girls (Imbruglia)	1	"Bring Me to Life"	Evanescence	Safe
Altiyan Childs	Over 25s (Keating)	2	"Kiss"	Prince	Safe
Mitchell Smith	Boys (Sandilands)	3	"Baby"	Justin Bieber	Safe
Mahogany	Groups (Sebastian)	4	"Lady Marmalade"	Labelle	Safe
Hayley Teal	Girls (Imbruglia)	5	"Respect"	Aretha Franklin	Safe
Andrew Lawson	Boys (Sandilands)	6	"Wherever You Will Go"	The Calling	Safe
Amanda Grafanakis	Over 25s (Keating)	7	"The Voice Within"	Christina Aguilera	Bottom Two
Luke & Joel	Groups (Sebastian)	8	"Little Lion Man"	Mumford & Sons	Safe
India-Rose Madderom	Girls (Imbruglia)	9	"One"	U2	Safe
James McNally	Over 25s (Keating)	10	"Maggie May"	Rod Stewart	Bottom Two
Kharizma	Groups (Sebastian)	11	"Single Ladies (Put a Ring on It)"	Beyoncé	Safe
Final showdown details
Act	Category (mentor)	Order	Song		Result
Amanda Grafanakis	Over 25s (Keating)	1	"Wonderwall"		Safe
James McNally	Over 25s (Keating)	2	"Let's Stay Together"		Eliminated

Judges' votes to eliminate

- Imbruglia: James McNally – gave no reason, but commented that neither act should be in the bottom two.
- Sebastian: James McNally – based on the final showdown performance.
- Sandilands: Amanda Grafanakis – had earlier commented that Grafanakis should be in the bottom two.
- Keating: Amanda Grafanakis – could not send either of his own acts home and sent the result to deadlock.

With the acts in the bottom two receiving two votes each, the result went to deadlock and reverted to the earlier public vote. McNally was eliminated as the act with the fewest public votes.

==== Week 3 (3/4 October) ====
- Theme: Songs that defined a decade
- Celebrity performers: The Script ("For the First Time") and Amy Meredith ("Young at Heart")
- Group performance: "Bad Romance"

Acts' performances on the third live show
Act	Category (mentor)	Order	Song	Result
Hayley Teal	Girls (Imbruglia)	1	"River Deep – Mountain High"	Safe
Andrew Lawson	Boys (Sandilands)	2	"(I Could Only) Whisper Your Name"	Safe
Kharizma	Groups (Sebastian)	3	"I'll Stand by You"	Bottom Two
India-Rose Madderom	Girls (Imbruglia)	4	"Sweet Dreams (Are Made of This)"	Safe
Altiyan Childs	Over 25s (Keating)	5	"The Lady in Red"	Safe
Luke & Joel	Groups (Sebastian)	6	"Smooth Criminal"	Safe
Sally Chatfield	Girls (Imbruglia)	7	"You're the Voice"	Safe
Mitchell Smith	Boys (Sandilands)	8	"To Be with You"	Safe
Mahogany	Groups (Sebastian)	9	"Time After Time"	Bottom Two
Amanda Grafanakis	Over 25s (Keating)	10	"Vogue"	Safe
Final showdown details
Act	Category (mentor)	Order	Song	Result
Kharizma	Groups (Sebastian)	1	"The Climb"	Eliminated
Mahogany	Groups (Sebastian)	2	"Footprints in the Sand"	Safe

Judges' votes to eliminate

- Imbruglia: Kharizma – based on the final showdown performance, though commented that neither should be in the bottom two.
- Sandilands: Kharizma – felt Kharizma had stalled while Mahogany continued to grow.
- Sebastian abstained from voting as both acts were in his category.
- Keating: Kharizma – based on the final showdown performance and comments made at beginning of the show.

Notes

- Sebastian was absent from the live performance show but was present on the live results show through live telecast, thus eligible to vote if required.

==== Week 4 (10/11 October) ====
- Theme: Party Anthems
- Celebrity performers: Boyzone ("Life Is a Rollercoaster"/"Gave It All Away")
- Group performance: "Club Can't Handle Me"

Acts' performances on the fourth live show
Act	Category (mentor)	Order	Song	Result
India-Rose Madderom	Girls (Madderom)	1	"Jai Ho! (You Are My Destiny)"	Bottom Two
Andrew Lawson	Boys (Sandilands)	2	"Heartache Tonight"	Safe
Amanda Grafanakis	Over 25s (Keating)	3	"I Gotta Feeling"	Bottom Two
Luke & Joel	Groups (Sebastian)	4	"Hey Ya!"	Safe
Sally Chatfield	Girls (Imbruglia)	5	"Don't Stop Me Now"	Safe
Mitchell Smith	Boys (Sandilands)	6	"Forever"	Safe
Mahogany	Groups (Sebastian)	7	"...Baby One More Time"	Safe
Altiyan Childs	Over 25s (Keating)	8	"Livin' on a Prayer"	Safe
Hayley Teal	Girls (Imbruglia)	9	"When Love Takes Over"	Safe
Final showdown details
Act	Category (mentor)	Order	Song	Result
India-Rose Madderom	Girls (Imbruglia)	1	"Can't Take My Eyes off You"	Safe
Amanda Grafanakis	Over 25s (Keating)	2	"Wind Beneath My Wings"	Eliminated

Judges' votes to eliminate

- Imbruglia: Amanda Grafanakis – backed her own act, India-Rose Madderom.
- Sandilands: Amanda Grafanakis – said that he would more likely "invest money" with Madderom.
- Keating: India-Rose Madderom – backed his own act, Amanda Grafanakis.
- Sebastian: Amanda Grafanakis – felt that Madderom was more consistent in the competition as a whole.

==== Week 5 (17/18 October) ====
- Theme: Rock
- Celebrity performers: Adam Lambert ("If I Had You") and Short Stack ("Planets")
- Group performance: "Forget You"

Acts' performances on the fifth live show
Act	Category (mentor)	Order	Song	Rock artist	Result
Sally Chatfield	Girls (Imbruglia)	1	"Decode"	Paramore	Safe
Mitchell Smith	Boys (Sandilands)	2	"Jessie's Girl"	Rick Springfield	Bottom Two
Hayley Teal	Girls (Imbruglia)	3	"Whole Lotta Love"	Led Zeppelin	Safe
Luke & Joel	Groups (Sebastian)	4	"Best of You"	Foo Fighters	Safe
Andrew Lawson	Boys (Sandilands)	5	"Crocodile Rock"	Elton John	Safe
India-Rose Madderom	Girls (Imbruglia)	6	"Iris"	Goo Goo Dolls	Bottom Two
Mahogany	Groups (Sebastian)	7	"While My Guitar Gently Weeps"	The Beatles	Safe
Altiyan Childs	Over 25s (Keating)	8	"Beautiful Day"	U2	Safe
Final showdown details
Act	Category (mentor)	Order	Song		Result
Mitchell Smith	Boys (Sandilands)	1	"Teenage Dream"		Eliminated
India-Rose Madderom	Girls (Imbruglia)	2	"Bitter Sweet Symphony"		Safe

Judges' votes to eliminate

- Sandilands: India-Rose Madderom – despite his absence during the results show, an automatic vote was cast to save Mitchell Smith based on the usual assumption that he would have voted to save his own act.
- Sebastian: India-Rose Madderom – stated that Madderom, despite being the better singer, had not grown throughout the competition.
- Imbruglia: Mitchell Smith – backed her own act, India-Rose Madderom.
- Keating: Mitchell Smith – could not decide and sent the result to deadlock.

With the acts in the bottom two receiving two votes each, the result went to deadlock and reverted to the earlier public vote. Smith was eliminated as the act with the fewest public votes.

==== Week 6 (24/25 October) ====
- Theme: Blockbuster Hits
- Celebrity performers: Stan Walker ("Choose You") and Kasey Chambers ("Little Bird")
- Group performance: "DJ Got Us Fallin' in Love"

Acts' performances on the sixth live show
Act	Category (mentor)	Order	Song	Movie	Result
India-Rose Madderom	Girls (Imbruglia)	1	"Fame"	Fame	Bottom Two
Andrew Lawson	Boys (Sandilands)	2	"Love Is All Around"	Four Weddings and a Funeral	Safe
Sally Chatfield	Girls (Imbruglia)	3	"All by Myself"	Bridget Jones's Diary	Safe
Hayley Teal	Girls (Imbruglia)	4	"Queen of the Night"	The Bodyguard	Safe
Luke & Joel	Groups (Sebastian)	5	"I Don't Want to Miss a Thing"	Armageddon	Safe
Altiyan Childs	Over 25s (Keating)	6	"Eye of the Tiger"	Rocky III	Safe
Mahogany	Groups (Sebastian)	7	"I Say a Little Prayer"	My Best Friend's Wedding	Bottom Two
Final showdown details
Act	Category (mentor)	Order	Song		Result
India-Rose Madderom	Girls (Imbruglia)	1	"You Got the Love"		Eliminated
Mahogany	Groups (Sebastian)	2	"I Want You Back"		Safe

Judges' votes to eliminate

- Keating: India-Rose Madderom – stated that earlier in the show that he believed this would be her last week on the show.
- Imbruglia: Mahogany – backed her own act, India-Rose Madderom.
- Sebastian: India-Rose Madderom – backed his own act, Mahogany.
- Sandilands: India-Rose Madderom – been in the final showdown for the third time.

==== Week 7 (31 October/ 1 November) ====
- Theme: Summer songs
- Celebrity performers: Enrique Iglesias featuring Havana Brown ("Heartbeat") and Mike Posner ("Cooler Than Me")
- Group performance: "Evacuate the Dancefloor"

Acts' performances on the seventh live show
Act	Category (mentor)	Order	Song	Result
Altiyan Childs	Over 25s (Keating)	1	"Summer of '69"	Safe
Hayley Teal	Girls (Imbruglia)	2	"California Gurls"	Bottom Two
Andrew Lawson	Boys (Sandilands)	3	"Sunday Morning"	Safe
Mahogany	Groups (Sebastian)	4	"Survivor"	Safe
Luke & Joel	Groups (Sebastian)	5	"Wouldn't It Be Nice"	Bottom Two
Sally Chatfield	Girls (Imbruglia)	6	"Since U Been Gone"	Safe
Final showdown details
Act	Category (mentor)	Order	Song	Result
Hayley Teal	Girls (Imbruglia)	1	"Valerie"	Eliminated
Luke & Joel	Groups (Sebastian)	2	"Where the Streets Have No Name"	Safe

Judges' votes to eliminate

- Keating: Hayley Teal – said that Teal was lacking "energy and star quality" in this week's performances.
- Imbruglia: Luke & Joel – backed her own act, Hayley Teal.
- Sebastian: Hayley Teal – backed his own act, Luke & Joel.
- Sandilands: Hayley Teal – commented that it was about "who is going to be an icon of Australian music".

==== Week 8: Quarter-Final (7/8 November) ====
- Theme: Songs from Australian artists
- Celebrity mentor: Mel B
- Celebrity performers: Jason Derülo ("The Sky's the Limit") and Jessica Mauboy ("Saturday Night")
- Group performance: "Stop" with Mel B

Acts' performances in the quarter-final
Act	Category (mentor)	Order	Song	Result
Luke & Joel	Groups (Sebastian)	1	"White Noise"	Bottom Two
Sally Chatfield	Girls (Imbruglia)	2	"Everything I'm Not"	Safe
Andrew Lawson	Boys (Sandilands)	3	"Black and Gold"	Safe
Mahogany	Groups (Sebastian)	4	"The Horses"	Bottom Two
Altiyan Childs	Over 25s (Keating)	5	"Never Tear Us Apart"	Safe
Final showdown details
Act	Category (mentor)	Order	Song	Result
Luke & Joel	Groups (Sebastian)	1	"Human"	Eliminated
Mahogany	Groups (Sebastian)	2	"Stand Up for Love"	Safe

Judges' votes to eliminate

- Keating: Mahogany – commented that Luke & Joel have what it takes to sell records.
- Imbruglia: Luke & Joel – felt that Mahogany performed better that week.
- Sandilands: Luke & Joel – Mahogany can go more further.
- Sebastian: Mahogany – could not send either of his own acts home and sent the result to deadlock.

With the acts in the bottom two receiving two votes each, the result went to deadlock and reverted to the earlier public vote. Luke & Joel were eliminated as the act with the fewest public votes.

==== Week 9: Semi-Final (14/15 November) ====
- Theme: Number one singles
- Celebrity mentor: Robin Gibb
- Celebrity performers: Ronan Keating featuring Paulini ("Believe Again") and Kesha ("We R Who We R")
- Group performance: "The Final Countdown"

Acts' performances in the semi-final
Act	Category (mentor)	Order	First song	Order	Second song	Result
Andrew Lawson	Boys (Sandilands)	1	"Uptown Girl"	5	"Somethin' Stupid"	Safe
Mahogany	Groups (Sebastian)	2	"Heaven"	6	"The Way You Make Me Feel"	Eliminated
Sally Chatfield	Girls (Imbruglia)	3	"Just Like a Pill"	7	"Beautiful"	Safe
Altiyan Childs	Over 25s (Keating)	4	"The Living Years"	8	"Blaze of Glory"	Safe

Notes

- For the first time this season, each act performed two songs.
- Also for the first time, there was no final showdown and the act that received the fewest public votes was immediately eliminated.

==== Week 10: Final (21/22 November) ====
21 November

- Theme: No theme (songs from the auditions and live shows that the mentor believes will show their true talent); celebrity duets
- Celebrity duet performers:
  - Jamiroquai with Sally Chatfield
  - James Blunt with Andrew Lawson
  - INXS with Altiyan Childs
- Group performance: "Dynamite" and "With A Little Help From My Friends" – performed by all 12 finalists

Acts' performances on the Sunday Final
Act	Category (mentor)	Order	Audition song	Order	Celebrity duet	Order	Mentor's favourite	Order	Winner's single	Result
Andrew Lawson	Boys (Sandilands)	1	"Fly Me to the Moon"	4	"You're Beautiful"	7	"Heartache Tonight"	10	"Somewhere in the World"	Eliminated
Sally Chatfield	Girls (Imbruglia)	2	"Hurt"	5	"Canned Heat"	8	"Don't Stop Me Now"	11	"Somewhere in the World"	Safe
Altiyan Childs	Over 25s (Keating)	3	"Sex on Fire"	6	"Don't Change"	9	"Livin' on a Prayer"	12	"Somewhere in the World"	Safe

22 November

- Group performance: "Sweet Disposition" (performed by Sally Chatfield and Altiyan Childs)
- Celebrity performers: Jamiroquai ("White Knuckle Ride"), INXS ("New Sensation"), James Blunt ("Stay the Night") and Guy Sebastian featuring Eve ("Who's That Girl")

Acts' performances on the Monday Final
Act	Category (mentor)	Order	Song	Result
Sally Chatfield	Girls (Imbruglia)	1	"Decode"	Runner-Up
Altiyan Childs	Over 25s (Keating)	2	"Beautiful Day"	Winner

== Reception ==
=== Controversies ===
On 18 October 2010, following the live results show, contestant Altiyan Childs disappeared from The X Factor house for almost 24 hours, causing a serious concern for his mentor Keating, who took to Twitter to try to locate where Childs was. Childs later returned at 5 pm the next day. A program producer said that he had "taken some time out to be by himself and slept in a cave on Sydney's northern beaches overnight". On 21 October, Childs spoke with guest host Keating and Jackie O on radio station 2Day FM to set the record straight about his disappearance. He explained: "It kind of hit me randomly at about 2 am that I had to reconnect with part of my sadness, it’s my secret power it’s what drives me through the song and ignites that part of me, it’s got to do with sadness, I needed to go back to somewhere where I felt an intimate romantic thing with an ancient memory and it worked. Childs stayed in a cave on Sydney's Northern Beaches. As he awoke, Childs realised he was supposed to be practising with his mentor Keating. The cave was a special place for Childs and his former fiancee. Their five-year engagement ended in 2002, but the hurt remains and Childs has been celibate since. He explained: "I was broken, a piece of me was broken and I didn't think it was repairable. I'm not used to comfort and compliments because I have never been accepted before. I needed to know what to do with the contentedness and beauty of it all, and I needed that place to do it."

On 25 October 2010 it was revealed that a name-calling cat fight between the Under 25 Girls had occurred during a performance at the Snaparazzi at Riva in St Kilda on 22 October. Contestant India-Rose Madderom was reportedly yelling abuse at contestant Sally Chatfield after the two missed their cues while performing David Guetta's "When Love Takes Over". Chatfield then fired back at Madderom before dissolving in tears. The girls mentor Imbruglia stepped in and reportedly told Madderom "you can't act like this in public" and "you have to be professional."

=== Ratings ===
The premiere episode on 30 August 2010 achieved an audience of 1,186,000 and placed fifth overall for the night, being beaten by A Current Affair's interview with Patty and Bert Newton, the parents of former X Factor host Matthew Newton, about his exit from the show due to his alleged attack on his former girlfriend Rachel Taylor. However, the premiere episode topped its timeslot. The second episode rated higher than the first, peaking at number four with an audience share of 1,482,000. The ratings boost was credited to Seven's top rating show Packed to the Rafters, which topped the night's overall ratings. The first live performance show on 19 September 2010 archived an audience of 1,095,000 and placed eighth overall for the night. The live grand final decider show on 22 November 2010 reached an audience of 1,833,000 and topped the night's overall ratings.

Colour key:
– Highest rating during the season
– Lowest rating during the season

Episode		Original airdate	Timeslot	Viewers (millions)	Nightly rank	Source
1	Auditions 1	30 August 2010	Monday 7:30 pm–9:00 pm	1.186	#5	
2	Auditions 2	31 August 2010	Tuesday 7:30 pm–8:30 pm	1.482	#4	
3	Auditions 3	1 September 2010	Wednesday 7:30 pm–8:30 pm	1.332	#6	
4	Auditions 4	2 September 2010	Thursday 7:30 pm–8:30 pm	1.336	#1	
5	Bootcamp 1	5 September 2010	Sunday 7:30 pm–9:00 pm	1.287	#4	
6	Bootcamp 2	6 September 2010	Monday 7:30 pm–8:30 pm	1.307	#3	
7	Judges Houses 1	12 September 2010	Sunday 7:30 pm–9:00 pm	1.074	#11	
8	Judges Houses 2	13 September 2010	Monday 7:30 pm–8:30 pm	1.234	#5	
9	Live show 1	19 September 2010	Sunday 7:30 pm–9:30 pm	1.095	#8	
10	Live decider 1	20 September 2010	Monday 7:30 pm–8:30 pm	0.978	#11	
11	Live show 2	26 September 2010	Sunday 7:30 pm–9:30 pm	1.054	#6	
12	Live decider 2	27 September 2010	Monday 7:30 pm–8:30 pm	1.126	#5	
13	Live show 3	3 October 2010	Sunday 7:30 pm–9:30 pm	1.115	#7	
14	Live decider 3	4 October 2010	Monday 7:30 pm–8:30 pm	0.984	#8	
15	Live show 4	10 October 2010	Sunday 7:30 pm–9:00 pm	1.224	#4	
16	Live decider 4	11 October 2010	Monday 7:30 pm–8:30 pm	1.182	#4	
17	Live show 5	17 October 2010	Sunday 7:30 pm–9:00 pm	1.081	#6	
18	Live decider 5	18 October 2010	Monday 7:30 pm–8:30 pm	1.056	#11	
19	Live show 6	24 October 2010	Sunday 7:30 pm–9:00 pm	1.079	#7	
20	Live decider 6	25 October 2010	Monday 7:30 pm–8:30 pm	1.027	#13	
21	Live show 7	31 October 2010	Sunday 7:30 pm–9:00 pm	1.089	#6	
22	Live decider 7	1 November 2010	Monday 7:30 pm–8:30 pm	1.033	#11	
23	Live show 8	7 November 2010	Sunday 7:30 pm–9:00 pm	1.248	#5	
24	Live decider 8	8 November 2010	Monday 7:30 pm–8:30 pm	0.938	#15	
25	Live show 9	14 November 2010	Sunday 7:30 pm–9:00 pm	1.206	#3	
26	Live decider 9	15 November 2010	Monday 7:30 pm–8:30 pm	1.119	#9	
28	Live Grand Final show	21 November 2010	Sunday 7.30 pm–9:30 pm	1.374	#2	
29	Live Grand Final decider	22 November 2010	Monday 7.30 pm–9:30 pm	1.363	#3	
29	Winner announced	22 November 2010	Monday 7.30 pm–9:30 pm	1.632	#1	
