= Altiyan Childs =

Australian singer-songwriter

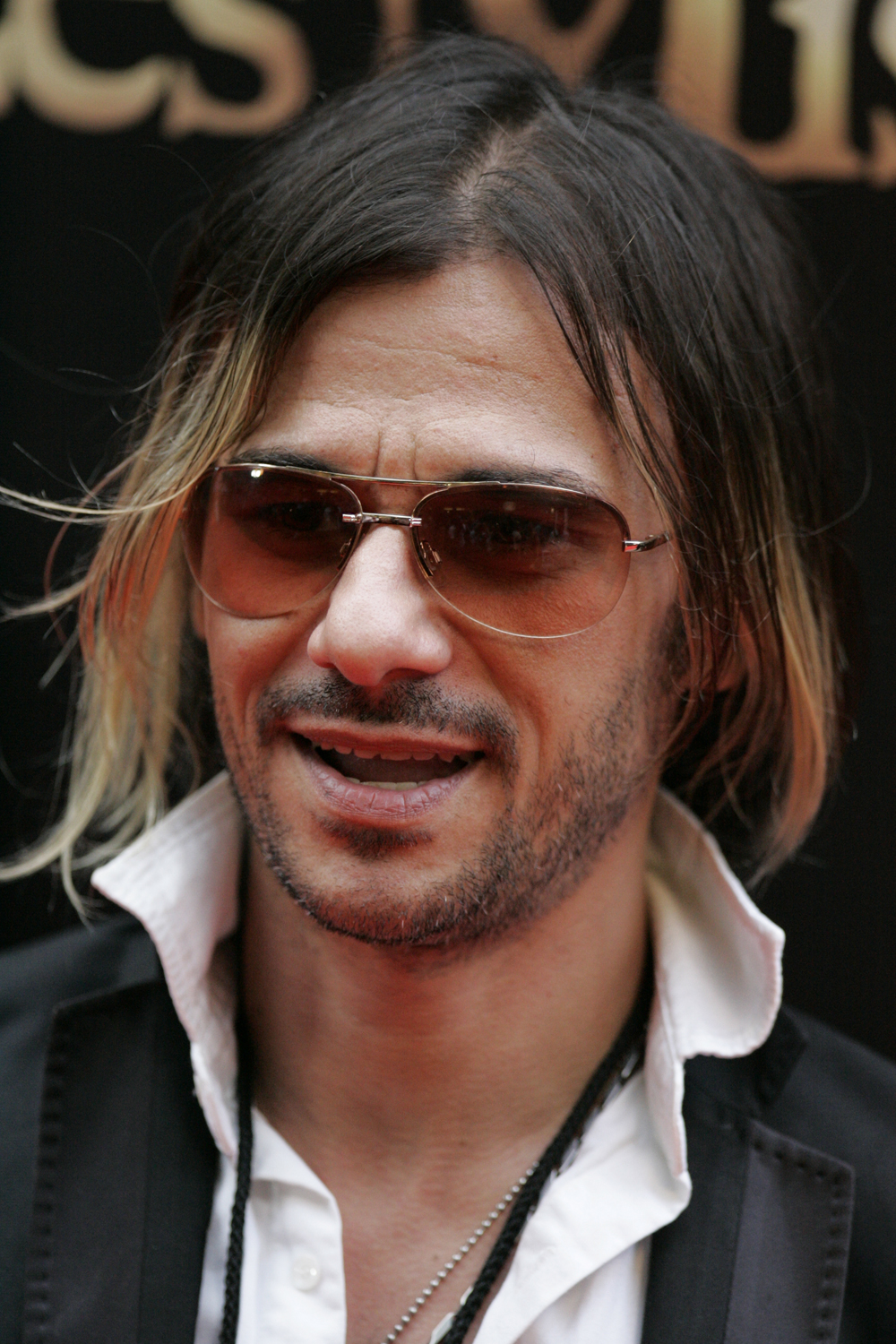

Background information
- Also known as: Altiyan Childs
- Born: Altijan Juric; 10 June 1975 (age 51); Mount Isa, Queensland, Australia
- Origin: Sydney
- Genre: Rock
- Occupation: Singer-songwriter
- Instruments: Vocals, guitar
- Years active: 2004–present
- Labels: Silverback Records (2004–08) Sony Music Australia (2010–12) Oxygen Music Group (2012–13)
- Formerly of: Masonia
- Spouse: Samantha Greenland (m. 2022)

Altijan Juric (born 10 June 1975), best known by his stage name Altiyan Childs, is an Australian singer-songwriter. He was the winner of the second season of The X Factor Australia in 2010, and subsequently signed with Sony Music Australia.

His debut single "Somewhere in the World" reached the top-ten in Australia and New Zealand and his self-titled debut album peaked at number three on the ARIA Albums Chart; and was certified platinum. His second studio album Born Before the Sun was released in September 2015, and was preceded by the release of six singles. In 2016 he played the title role in a Queensland production of Jesus Christ Superstar.

== Biography ==
=== 1975–2008: Early life ===
Altiyan Childs was born Altjian Juric in Mount Isa, Queensland but grew up in Sydney. His father is of Croatian descent and his mother is Serbian. Childs and his sister, Altiyana, were named after their father's sister Altijana, who was murdered at only two months of age. At the age of 13, while a student at Chatswood High School, Childs was the front man for a rock band called Over the Edge and, less than two years after graduating from high school, he formed a band called Masonia with Daniel Rivers, Mo Bloomfield and Nathan Meryment. The band had minor success in 2004 with their debut single "Simple", which reached number 41 on the ARIA Singles Chart. Masonia disbanded in 2008 and Childs decided to retire from music.

=== 2010: The X Factor Australia ===
Childs auditioned for the second season of The X Factor Australia in 2010. Falling into the Over 25's category, he was mentored by Irish singer Ronan Keating who selected him for the finals – a series of ten weekly live shows in which contestants are progressively eliminated by public vote. Keating had received criticism by the Australian public for sending Childs through, as he had forgotten his lyrics multiple times during the audition process.

Throughout the finals, however, Childs was praised continually from the judges, specifically for his performances of Bon Jovi's "Livin' on a Prayer", U2's "Beautiful Day", "Eye of the Tiger", "Sex on Fire" by Kings of Leon and also Bryan Adams' "Summer of '69". After week five's performance show, Childs disappeared from rehearsals and visited a cave on the Sydney Northern beaches in a need to reconnect with "beautiful sadness". During a radio interview with 2Day FM, he said "It kind of hit me randomly at about 2 am that I had to reconnect with part of my sadness, it’s my secret power it’s what drives me through the song and ignites that part of me, it’s got to do with sadness, I needed to go back to somewhere where I felt an intimate romantic thing with an ancient memory and it worked".

Throughout the competition, Childs had never landed in the bottom two, and ended up progressing through to the final show with Sally Chatfield and Andrew Lawson. The grand final results show was held on 22 November 2010 and during the early stage of the show it was revealed that Lawson had received the fewest public votes and was automatically eliminated. Chatfield and Childs became the final two and after the public votes had been tallied it was announced that Childs was the winner, making him the first contestant from the Over 25s to come first. As the winner, Childs received a recording contract with record label Sony Music Australia.

=== 2010–present: Debut album and controversies ===
Childs' debut single "Somewhere in the World" was made available for download following his win on The X Factor on 22 November 2010. The song debuted on the ARIA Singles Chart at number eight, and also debuted on the New Zealand Singles Chart at number five. His self-titled debut album was released in Australia and New Zealand on 10 December 2010, featuring re-recorded covers of the songs he performed on The X Factor. The album peaked at number three on the ARIA Albums Chart and was certified platinum by the Australian Recording Industry Association (ARIA), for shipments of 70,000 copies. In New Zealand, the album reached number three and was certified platinum by the Recording Industry Association of New Zealand (RIANZ), for sales of 15,000 copies.

On 4 April 2011, Childs' personal manager was arrested after police uncovered a chemical lab that was used to manufacture large quantities of prohibited drugs. Childs shared the property with other housemates, including his manager. Childs had moved out of the property days before the raid took place. His manager was also charged over illegal weapons, which included rifles, pellet guns and a Taser. Childs was not charged. In an interview with Today Tonight, which was broadcast on the Seven Network on 11 April 2011, Childs revealed that he was earning less than he had as a forklift driver, despite releasing a single in 2010 and touring across Australia. He also revealed plans of marrying his 19-year-old girlfriend, Nikki Kingston, whom he had met through Facebook. In June 2011, Childs told Australian radio program The Kyle & Jackie O Show that he was planning a national tour of Australia in August that year and that, if his record label agreed, he would like to release a second studio album.

In January 2012, Childs was found guilty in Taree Local Court of having methamphetamine and marijuana in his system after being pulled over while driving in November 2011. His driver's licence was suspended for six months and he was fined $600. As a result of the incident, Rockdale City Council stripped Childs of the key to the city it had awarded him, prompting Childs to launch a tirade alleging corruption at the council. The incident also led to Childs falling out with his X Factor mentor Ronan Keating. On 24 January 2012, it was announced that Childs had parted ways with Sony Music Australia. A spokesperson for the record label told News Limited, "He wanted to move in another direction and the decision was mutual. We wish him all the best." During this time, Childs announced on his official Facebook page that he would be releasing a tell-all memoir titled Altiyan & Goliath, detailing the "deepest truths" about the rise and fall of his post-X Factor career.

In late 2012, Childs signed with independent label Oxygen Music Group. His second album Born Before the Sun was expected to be released in 2013. The first single, "Headlines", was released in December 2012 and failed to reach the ARIA Top 100. In March 2013, Oxygen Music announced Childs was no longer their client. He was signed to Vibe Management and it was announced Childs would be going to the US to sign a recording deal, and doing a series of performances and interviews, including shows at the Viper Room in Los Angeles, the Hard Rock Hotel in San Diego and Tao Nightclub in Las Vegas. An article in the Daily Telegraph stated that these venues all denied Childs was performing at them. Childs returned to Australia in May 2013 and made a statement on Facebook saying the trip had not gone as planned because he had been let down by his American agent. He claimed he had then been offered a contract to release his album in the US and France. He also stated he was no longer with Vibe Management.

On 20 December 2013, Childs released "Dreams" as the first single from his second studio album Born Before the Sun. On 13 March 2014, Childs independently released the album's second single, "Girl". The third single, "Celebrity", was released on 4 July 2014. Born Before the Sun was released on 27 September 2015, through independent label 9LoveRecords. The album is a collection of material Childs had written over the past 15 years and comes almost five years after his self-titled debut album was released. Born Before the Sun was made available predominantly in digital format, with physical copies made available to buy from Childs' official website.

In 2016 Childs was cast in the title role for Gateway Theatre Production's Jesus Christ Superstar. The show was a success, selling out all six shows in Queensland. The show was held at the Events Centre in Caloundra. Reviews were positive.

In late 2016, Childs married his girlfriend of four years, Samantha Greenland, in a private ceremony. Childs announced the marriage on his Facebook page.

On 15 April 2021, Childs released a five-hour YouTube video on Freemasonry. Childs claimed to be a former member of the Masonic fraternity, breaking his Masonic oaths in order to produce his presentation. The conclusion of the presentation alleged that international Freemasonry is "organised Satanism" in disguise (No source needed).

In 2023, Childs made a comeback to music, releasing singles from 11 January to 20 July independently. The songs are "Nobody" (11 January 2023), "Baptised" (18 February 2023), "Covenant" (6 April 2023), "24 years" (6 April 2023), "Since I Heard About You" (29 May 2023), and "The Power" (20 July 2023).

== Discography ==
=== Studio albums ===
Title	Album details	Peak chart positions		Certifications
Title	Album details	AUS	NZ	Certifications
Altiyan Childs	Released: 10 December 2010; Formats: CD, digital download; Label: Sony Music Australia	3	3	ARIA: Platinum; RMNZ: Platinum
Born Before the Sun	Released: 27 September 2015; Formats: CD, digital download; Label: 9LoveRecords	—	—	

=== Singles ===
Title	Year	Peak chart positions		Certifications	Album
Title	Year	AUS	NZ	Certifications	Album
"Somewhere in the World"	2010	8	5	ARIA: Platinum	Altiyan Childs
"Ordinary Man"	2011	55	—		Non-album singles
"Headlines"	2012	—	—		Non-album singles
"Dreams"	2013	—	—		Born Before the Sun
"Girl"	2014	—	—		Born Before the Sun
"Celebrity"	2014	—	—		Born Before the Sun
"Water"	2014	—	—		Born Before the Sun
"Rise Up"	2015	—	—		Born Before the Sun
"Kiss Me"	2015	—	—		Born Before the Sun
"Driving"	2015	—	—		Born Before the Sun
"—" denotes a recording that did not chart in that territory.

== Awards and nominations ==
Year	Type	Award	Result
2011	ARIA Music Awards	Highest Selling Album (Altiyan Childs)	Won
2011	ARIA Music Awards	Most Popular Australian Artist	Nominated
2013	Australian Independent Music Video Awards	Best Rock Music Video ("Headlines")	Won

Preceded by Random	The X Factor (Australia); Winner; 2010	Succeeded by Reece Mastin
