= Jim Hazlett =

Biographical details
- Born: January 13, 1926; Tarentum, Pennsylvania, U.S.
- Died: August 4, 2010 (aged 84); Richmond, Virginia, U.S.

Playing career

Football
- 1948–1951: Susquehanna
- Position: Center

Coaching career (HC unless noted)

Football
- 1952: Springdale HS (PA) (assistant)
- 1953–1960: Springdale HS (PA)
- 1961: Edinboro (assistant)
- 1962–1965: Edinboro
- 1966–1977: Susquehanna
- 1980–1986: Kean

Baseball
- 1962–1965: Edinboro
- 1966–1977: Susquehanna
- 1984–1987: Kean

Head coaching record
- Overall: 75–130–7 (college football)

Accomplishments and honors

Championships
- Football; 1 MAC Northern Division (1970)

James Hazlett (January 12, 1926 – August 4, 2010) was an American sports coach who was head football and baseball head coach for several universities in the northeastern United States. He coached at Susquehanna University, Edinboro University of Pennsylvania, and Kean University.

He was a three-sport standout at Susquehanna from 1948 to 1952. In 1950, he was named Little All-America while playing center on the undefeated football team.

== Coaching career ==
Hazlett was the head coach of the football and baseball teams at his first coaching stop, Edinboro. In four seasons his football teams went 13–18–2 overall (7–16–2 in conference play). Hazlett's next school was Susquehanna, where he also coached baseball and football. On the gridiron, the Crusaders went 39–69–3, including an MASCAC North Division title in 1970. Hazlett's last stop came at Kean from 1984 to 1987. In four seasons as the baseball coach, he compiled an overall record of 86–67–3, including two ECAC Tournament appearances in 1985 and 1986. In 1986, the Cougars were ECAC Champions. In football, the Cougars went 23–43–2, leaving his career football coaching record at 75–130–7.

== Death ==
Hazlett died August 4, 2010, at his home in Richmond, Virginia.

== Head coaching record ==
=== College football ===
Year	Team	Overall	Conference	Standing	Bowl/playoffs
Edinboro Fighting Scots (Pennsylvania State College Athletic Conference) (1962–1965)
1962	Edinboro	3–5	1–5	7th (West)	
1963	Edinboro	2–6	1–5	7th (West)	
1964	Edinboro	2–5–1	1–4–1	7th (West)	
1965	Edinboro	6–2–1	4–2–1	(West)	
Edinboro:		13–18–2	7–16–2		
Susquehanna Crusaders (Middle Atlantic Conference) (1966–1977)
1966	Susquehanna	3–6	1–2	NA (Northern College)	
1967	Susquehanna	1–8	0–3	NA (Northern College)	
1968	Susquehanna	2–6–1	1–5	7th (Northern College)	
1969	Susquehanna	6–3	5–1	2nd (Northern College)	
1970	Susquehanna	7–3	5–1	1st (Northern)	
1971	Susquehanna	3–6–1	0–5–1	6th (Northern)	
1972	Susquehanna	3–6	2–4	6th (Northern)	
1973	Susquehanna	2–7	1–6	6th (Northern)	
1974	Susquehanna	4–5–1	3–3	4th (Northern)	
1975	Susquehanna	3–6	2–4	6th (Northern)	
1976	Susquehanna	3–6	2–4	6th (Northern)	
1977	Susquehanna	2–7	1–5	6th (Northern)	
Susquehanna:		39–69–3	23–43–1		
Kean Squires / Cougars (New Jersey State Athletic Conference / New Jersey Athletic Conference) (1980–1986)
1980	Kean	4–5	2–4	T–4th	
1981	Kean	3–7	1–5	6th	
1982	Kean	2–8	1–5	6th	
1983	Kean	4–5–1	2–4	T–4th	
1984	Kean	4–4–1	3–2–1	3rd	
1985	Kean	3–7	1–5	6th	
1986	Kean	3–7	1–5	6th	
Kean:		23–43–2	11–30–1		
Total:		75–130–7			
National championship Conference title Conference division title or championship game berth
