= Hazlitt (name) =

Hazlitt is both a surname and a given name. Notable people with the name include:

- Gerry Hazlitt (1888–1915), Australian cricketer
- Henry Hazlitt (1894–1993), libertarian philosopher, economics writer, and journalist
- John Hazlitt (1767–1837), English artist
- William Hazlitt (Unitarian minister) (1737–1820), Unitarian minister and author
- William Hazlitt (1778–1830), English literary critic and essayist
- William Hazlitt (registrar) (1811–1893), English writer, translator, and registrar
- William Carew Hazlitt (1834–1913), English bibliographer, editor, writer, and lawyer
- Frederick Hazlitt Brennan (1901–1962), American screenwriter

Fictional characters:

- Seth Hazlitt
