= New Zealand top 50 singles of 2014 =

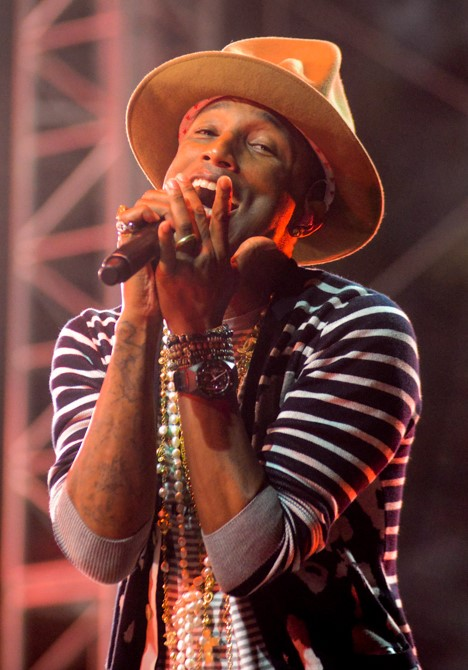
The best performing song of the year, "Happy", was released by American singer Pharrell Williams

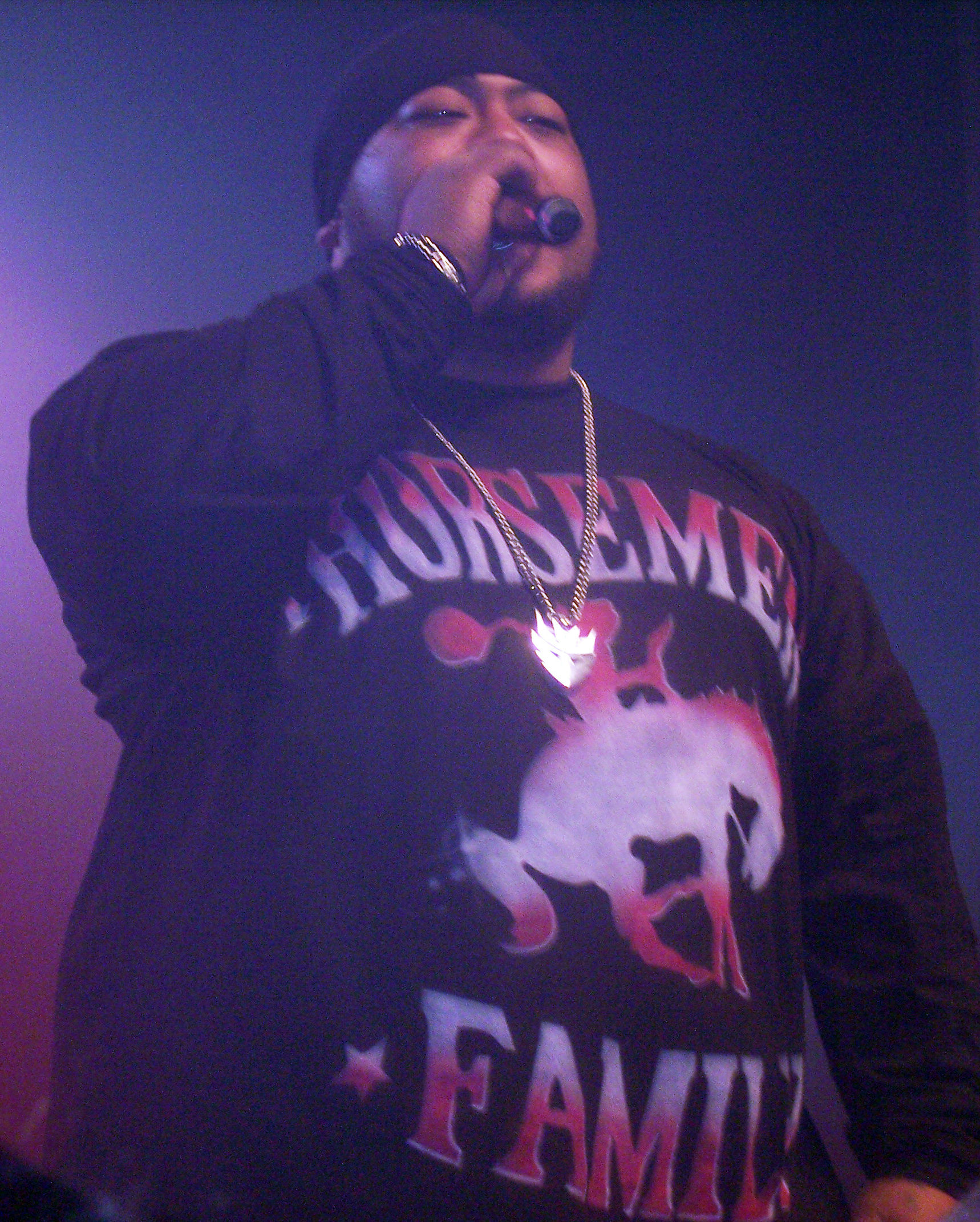
New Zealand rapper Savage released the top performing song by a New Zealand artist in 2014, with the song "Freaks" released alongside Australian DJ Timmy Trumpet

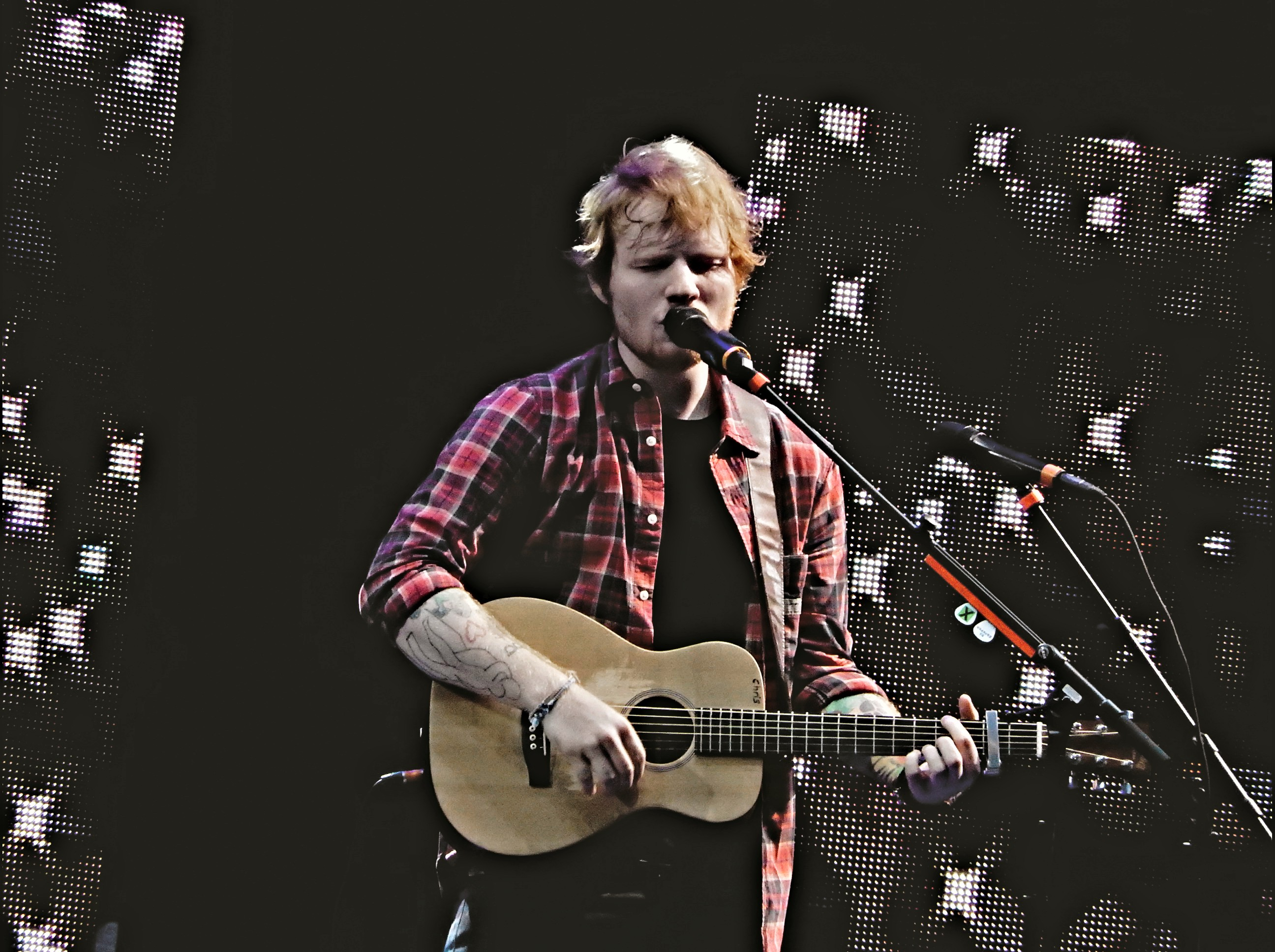
Four songs by English singer-songwriter Ed Sheeran featured among the top 50 singles of the year

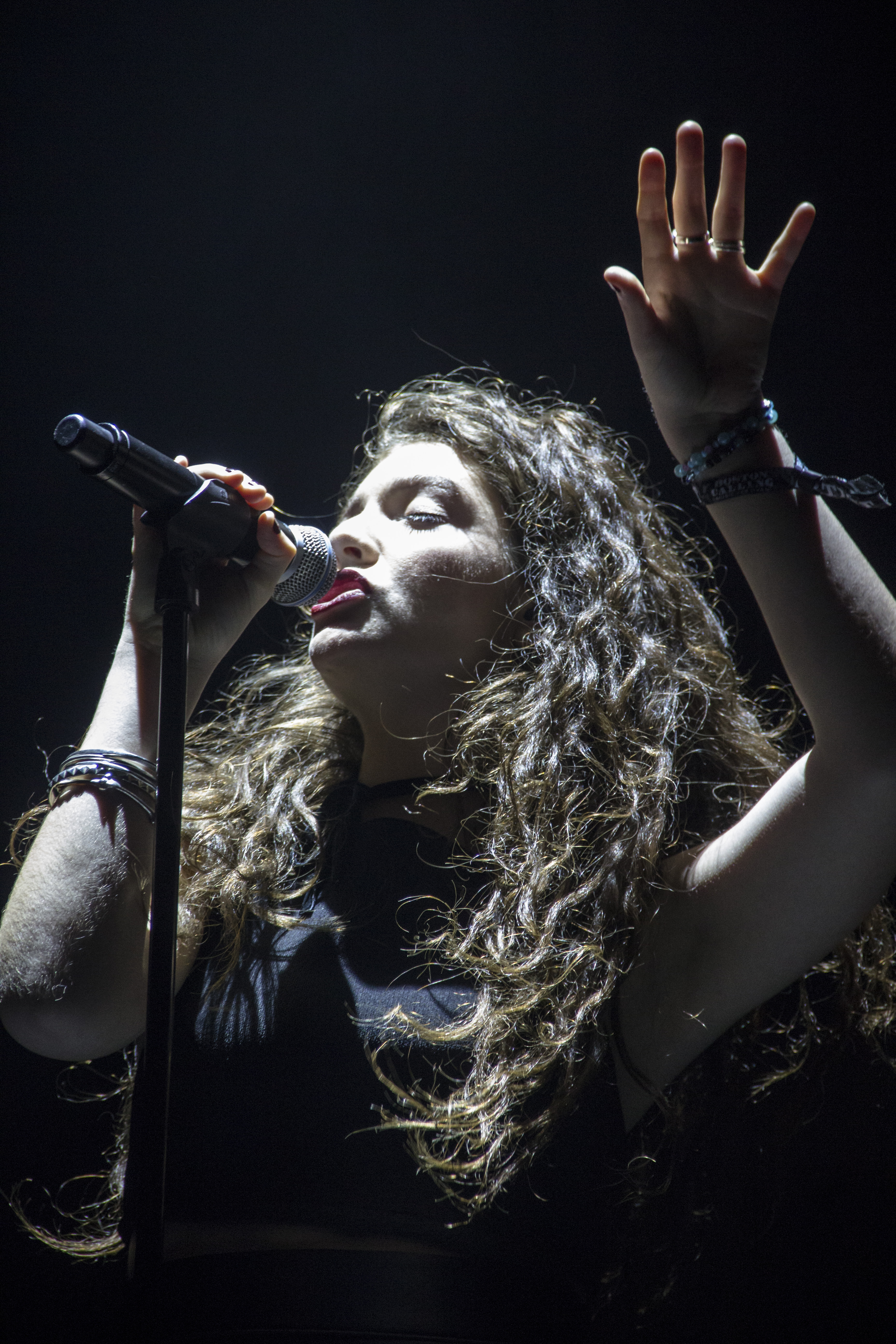
Five songs by New Zealand musician Lorde were among the top 20 singles by New Zealand artists released in 2014

This is a list of the top-selling singles in New Zealand for 2014 from the Official New Zealand Music Chart's end-of-year chart, compiled by Recorded Music NZ. English singer-songwriter Ed Sheeran had the most songs in the top 50, with four. The chart also includes three songs by New Zealand artists: "Freaks" by Australian DJ Timmy Trumpet and New Zealand rapper Savage, and "Holding You" by Ginny Blackmore and Stan Walker, and "Bridges" by Broods. Four songs also featured in the New Zealand top 50 singles of 2013: Katy Perry's songs "Roar" and "Dark Horse", "I See Fire" by Ed Sheeran, "The Monster" by Eminem and "Timber" by Pitbull. The 2014 chart was the first to include online streaming as well as sales data.

== Chart ==
Key
† – Song of New Zealand origin (Note: Whether or not a song is of New Zealand origin is determined by the RIANZ)

| Rank | Artist | Title |
|---|---|---|
| 1 | Pharrell Williams | "Happy" from the Despicable Me soundtrack and the album, Girl |
| 2 | Meghan Trainor | "All About That Bass" from the extended play, Title and the album, Title |
| 3 | John Legend | "All of Me" from the album, Love in the Future |
| 4 | Sam Smith | "Stay with Me" from the album, In the Lonely Hour |
| 5 | Taylor Swift | "Shake It Off" from the album, 1989 |
| 6 | Ed Sheeran | "I See Fire" from The Hobbit: The Desolation of Smaug soundtrack and the album, x. |
| 7 | A Great Big World featuring Christina Aguilera | "Say Something" from the album, Is There Anybody Out There? |
| 8 | Ed Sheeran | "Thinking Out Loud" from the album, x |
| 9 | The Madden Brothers | "We Are Done" from the album, Greetings from California |
| 10 | Magic! | "Rude" from the album, Don't Kill the Magic |
| 11 | Sia | "Chandelier" from the album, 1000 Forms of Fear |
| 12 | Jason Derulo | "Trumpets" from the albums Tattoos |
| 13 | Nico & Vinz | "Am I Wrong" from the album, Black Star Elephant |
| 14 | Iggy Azalea featuring Charli XCX | "Fancy" from the album, The New Classic |
| 15 | Ed Sheeran featuring Pharrell Williams | "Sing" from the album, x |
| 16 | George Ezra | "Budapest" from the album, Wanted on Voyage |
| 17 | Clean Bandit featuring Jess Glynne | "Rather Be" from the album, New Eyes |
| 18 | Sam Smith | "I'm Not the Only One" from the album, In The Lonely Hour |
| 19 | Ariana Grande featuring Iggy Azalea | "Problem" from the album, My Everything |
| 20 | G.R.L. | "Ugly Heart" from the album, G.R.L. |
| 21 | Mr Probz featuring Robin Schulz | "Waves (Robin Schulz Remix)" from the single of the same name |
| 22 | Paloma Faith | "Only Love Can Hurt Like This" from the album, A Perfect Contradiction |
| 23 | Pitbull featuring Kesha | "Timber" from the extended play, Meltdown |
| 24 | Avicii featuring Dan Tyminski | "Hey Brother" from the album, True |
| 25 | Jessie J, Ariana Grande and Nicki Minaj | "Bang Bang" from the albums, Sweet Talker & My Everything |
| 26 | Timmy Trumpet and Savage | "Freaks"† from the single, of the same name |
| 27 | Demi Lovato | "Let It Go" from the Frozen soundtrack and the album, Demi |
| 28 | Rudimental featuring Emeli Sandé | "Free" from the album, Home |
| 29 | Tove Lo featuring Hippie Sabotage | "Stay High (Hippie Sabotage Remix)" from the extended play, Truth Serum |
| 30 | Sara Bareilles | "Brave" from the album, The Blessed Unrest |
| 31 | Katy Perry featuring Juicy J | "Dark Horse" from the album, Prism |
| 32 | Milky Chance | "Stolen Dance" from the album, Sadnecessary and the extended play, Stolen Dance |
| 33 | Ella Henderson | "Ghost" from the album, Chapter One |
| 34 | Ed Sheeran | "Don't" from the album, x |
| 35 | Ginny Blackmore and Stan Walker | "Holding You"† from the album, Over the Moon |
| 36 | 5 Seconds of Summer | "She Looks So Perfect" from the album, 5 Seconds Of Summer |
| 37 | Sheppard | "Geronimo" from the album, Bombs Away |
| 38 | Katy Perry | "Roar" from the album, Prism |
| 39 | Aloe Blacc | "The Man" from the album, Lift Your Spirit and the extended play, Wake Me Up |
| 40 | DJ Snake & Lil Jon | "Turn Down for What" from the single of the same name |
| 41 | Sigma featuring Daniel Pearce | "Nobody to Love" from the album, Life |
| 42 | Avicii featuring Audra Mae | "Addicted to You" from the album, True |
| 43 | Redfoo | "New Thang" from the album, Party Rock Mansion |
| 44 | Justin Timberlake | "Not a Bad Thing" from the album, The 20/20 Experience - Part 2 Of 2 |
| 45 | Eminem featuring Rihanna | "The Monster" from the album, The Marshall Mathers LP 2 |
| 46 | Taylor Swift | "Blank Space" from the album, 1989 |
| 47 | Coldplay | "A Sky Full of Stars" from the album, Ghost Stories and the extended play, A Sky Full of Stars |
| 48 | Broods | "Bridges"† from the extended play, Broods and the album, Evergreen |
| 49 | Rita Ora | "I Will Never Let You Down" from the single the same name |
| 50 | Iggy Azalea featuring Rita Ora | "Black Widow" from the album, The New Classic |

== Top 20 singles of 2014 by New Zealand artists ==
| Rank | Artist | Title |
|---|---|---|
| 1 | Timmy Trumpet and Savage | "Freaks" from the single of the same name |
| 2 | Ginny Blackmore and Stan Walker | "Holding You" from the album, Over the Moon |
| 3 | Broods | "Bridges" from the extended play, Broods and the album, Evergreen |
| 4 | Lorde | "Yellow Flicker Beat" from The Hunger Games: Mockingjay, Part 1 soundtrack |
| 5 | Lorde | "Royals" from the extended play, The Love Club and the album, Pure Heroine |
| 6 | Broods | "Mother & Father" from the extended play, Broods and the album, Evergreen |
| 7 | Lorde | "Team" from the album, Pure Heroine |
| 8 | Six60 | "Special" from the album, Six60 (2) |
| 9 | Benny Tipene | "Make You Mine" from the extended play, Toulouse |
| 10 | David Dallas featuring Ruby Frost | "The Wire" from the album, Falling Into Place |
| 11 | Benny Tipene | "Lonely" from the extended play, Toulouse |
| 12 | Benny Tipene | "Step On Up" from the album, Bricks |
| 13 | Broods | "Never Gonna Change" from the extended play, Broods |
| 14 | Stan Walker featuring Ria Hall, Troy Kingi and Maisey Rika | "Aotearoa" from the single of the same name |
| 15 | Jupiter Project and Jetski Safari featuring Helen Corry | With You" from the single of the same name |
| 16 | David Dallas | "Runnin'" from the album, Falling Into Place |
| 17 | Lorde | "Ribs" from the album, Pure Heroine |
| 18 | Lorde | "Tennis Court" from the album, Pure Heroine |
| 19 | Brooke Fraser | "Kings & Queens" from the album, Brutal Romantic |
| 20 | Stan Walker | "Take It Easy" from the Mt. Zion soundtrack and the album, Inventing Myself |

Notes
- Although, Freaks is by Australian musician, Timmy Trumpet, the song was a collaboration between him and New Zealand rapper, Savage, therefore has been included in this chart.
- While Stan Walker was discovered in Australia, he is a New Zealander and therefore his songs have been included in this chart.

== Chart by numbers ==
=== Origin ===
==== By artist ====
The following shows the country of origin from where the artist (including any featured artist where applicable) originate from. Artists who appear more than once have only been tallied once.

| Country | Total |
|---|---|
| United States | 25 |
| England | 16 |
| Australia | 6 |
| New Zealand | 4 |
| Canada | 2 |
| Germany | 2 |
| Sweden | 2 |
| Barbados | 1 |
| France | 1 |
| Ghana | 1 |
| Ivory Coast | 1 |
| Norway | 1 |
| Scotland | 1 |
| Netherlands | 1 |
| Trinidad & Tobago | 1 |

Notes
- The members of G.R.L. originate from three countries (United States, Canada & England) which have been included in the tally.
- Although born in Trinidad & Tobago, Nicki Minaj has also been included as being from the United States.
- Although born in England, Emeli Sandé is also Scottish
- Although from New Zealand, Stan Walker was discovered in Australia and as such both countries have been included in his tally.
- Nico & Vinz were both born in the Ivory Coast (Nico) and Ghana (Vinz) respectively but raised in Norway. As such all three countries have been included in the tally.

==== By single ====
The following shows the country of origin from which the singles originate regardless of who the artist is.

| Country | Total |
|---|---|
| United States | 21 |
| England | 16 |
| Australia | 7 |
| New Zealand | 3 |
| Sweden | 3 |
| Canada | 2 |
| Germany | 2 |
| France | 1 |
| Ghana | 1 |
| Ivory Coast | 1 |
| Norway | 1 |
| Trinidad & Tobago | 1 |
| Netherlands | 1 |

Notes
- The members of G.R.L. originate from three countries (United States, Canada & England) which have been included in the tally.
- As Waves (Robin Schulz Remix) was a collaborated remix between Mr. Probz and Robin Schulz, both The Netherlands & Germany have been included in the tally.
- As the song Bang Bang was a collaboration between Jessie J, Nicki Minaj & Ariana Grande, England, United States and Trinidad & Tobago have been included in the tally.
- As the song Freaks was a collaboration between Timmy Trumpet and Savage, both Australia and New Zealand have been included in the tally.
- As the song Holding You was a collaboration between Ginny Blackmore & Stan Walker, New Zealand & Australia have been included in the tally.
- As the song Turn Down for What was a collaboration between DJ Snake & Lil Jon, both the United States and France have been included in the tally.
- As Nico & Vinz were born in the Ivory Coast (Nico) and Ghana (Vinz) respectively but raised in Norway, all three countries have been included in the tally.

=== Most singles ===
Shows the artists with the most singles to appear in this chart. Includes where they appear as a featured artist, however where a singer (e.g. Adam Levine) appears as a guest singer, this does not count towards their groups (e.g. Maroon 5) tally.

| Artist | Total |
|---|---|
| Ed Sheeran | 4 |
| Iggy Azalea | 3 |
| Taylor Swift | 2 |
| Sam Smith | 2 |
| Rita Ora | 2 |
| Katy Perry | 2 |
| Avicii | 2 |
| Ariana Grande | 2 |
| Pharrell Williams | 2 |

=== Format ===
Show where each single appears on, whether it was the artists album, a non-album single, an extended play or as part of a soundtrack. 2014 saw two remix versions of songs make the Top 50.

| Format | Total |
|---|---|
| Albums | 37 |
| EP | 8 |
| non-album singles | 3 |
| Soundtracks | 3 |

Notes
- The song Bang Bang appears on two albums, Jessie J’s Sweet Talker and Ariana Grande’s My Everything.
- The song Let It Go appears on both Demi Lovato’s album, Demi and the soundtrack to the animated movie, Frozen.
- The song The Man appears on the album Lift Your Spirit & the extended play Wake Me Up, both by Aloe Blacc.
- The song I See Fire appears on both Ed Sheeran’s album, x and the soundtrack to movie, The Hobbit: The Desolation of Smaug.
- The song Happy appears on both Pharrell Williams’s album, Girl and the soundtrack to the animated movie, Despicable Me 2.
- The song Trumpets appears on two albums, Talk Dirty and Tattoos, both by Jason Derulo.
- The song, All About That Bass, appears on the extended play Title and the album, Title, both by Meghan Trainor.

=== Multiple releases ===
The following shows singles that had multiple releases from the same album.

| Title | Total | Singles |
|---|---|---|
| 1989 (Taylor Swift) | 2 | Shake It Off; Blank Space |
| In The Lonely Hour (Sam Smith) | 2 | I'm Not The Only One; Stay With Me |
| My Everything (Ariana Grande) | 2 | Bang Bang; Problem |
| Prism (Katy Perry) | 2 | Dark Horse; Roar |
| The New Classic (Iggy Azalea) | 2 | Black Widow; Fancy |
| True (Avicii) | 2 | Addicted To You; Hey Brother |
| x (Ed Sheeran) | 4 | Don't; I See Fire; Sing; Thinking Out Loud |

=== Type ===
The following shows the denomination that each single was released as, whether as a solo artist or as part of a group, band or duo. Also shows how many singles had guest artists.

| Type | Total |
|---|---|
| Solo artists | 31 |
| Groups | 12 |
| Featured Artists | 12 |
| Collaborations | 7 |

Notes
- While uncredited in Ed Sheeran’s song Sing, Pharrell Williams has been included as a featured artist in this tally.
- While uncredited in Avicii’s song Hey Brother, Dan Tyminski has been included as a featured artist in this tally.
- While uncredited in Avicii’s song Addicted To You, Audra Mae has been included as a featured artist in this tally.

=== Top Genre ===
The following shows the most common genres the Top 50 singles are regarded as (as per their genre descriptions in the singles entries. Where a genre was not noted, the genre of the album/extended play was used instead.

| Genre | Total | Singles |
|---|---|---|
| Pop | 13 | A Sky Full Of Stars (Coldplay); Am I Wrong (Nico & Vinz); Bang Bang (Jessie J, Ariana Grande & Nicki Minaj); Brave (Sara Bareilles); Ghost (Ella Henderson); Holding You (Ginny Blackmore and Stan Walker); I’m Not the Only One (Sam Smith); Not a Bad Thing (Justin Timberlake); Only Love Can Hurt Like This (Paloma Faith); Rude (Magic!); Sing (Ed Sheeran featuring Pharrell Williams); Trumpets (Jason Derulo); Ugly Heart (G.R.L.) |
| R&B | 8 | All of Me (John Legend); Bang Bang (Jessie J, Ariana Grande & Nicki Minaj); Don't (Ed Sheeran); I’m Not the Only One (Sam Smith); Problem (Ariana Grande featuring Iggy Azalea); Sing (Ed Sheeran featuring Pharrell Williams); The Man (Aloe Blacc); Trumpets (Jason Derulo) |
| Soul | 8 | Addicted To You (Avicii featuring Audra Mae); All of Me (John Legend); Free (Rudimental featuring Emeli Sandé); Happy (Pharrell Williams); I’m Not the Only One (Sam Smith); Only Love Can Hurt Like This (Paloma Faith); Stay with Me (Sam Smith); The Man (Aloe Blacc) |
| Dance-pop | 5 | Hey Brother (Avicii featuring Dan Tyminski); I Will Never Let You Down (Rita Ora); Problem (Ariana Grande featuring Iggy Azalea); Shake It Off (Taylor Swift); Timber (Pitbull featuring Ke$ha) |
| Electronic Dance Music | 5 | A Sky Full Of Stars (Coldplay); Hey Brother (Avicii featuring Dan Tyminski); New Thang (Redfoo); Timber (Pitbull featuring Ke$ha); Turn Down for What (DJ Snake & Lil Jon) |
| Electropop | 4 | Blank Space (Taylor Swift); Bridges (Broods); Chandelier (Sia); Rather Be (Clean Bandit featuring Jess Glynne) |
| Trap | 4 | Black Widow (Iggy Azalea featuring Rita Ora); Dark Horse (Katy Perry featuring Juicy J); Habits (Stay High) (Hippie Sabotage Remix) (Tove Lo featuring Hippie Sabotage); Turn Down for What (DJ Snake & Lil Jon) |
| Hip hop | 3 | Bang Bang (Jessie J, Ariana Grande & Nicki Minaj); Dark Horse (Katy Perry featuring Juicy J); The Monster (Eminem featuring Rihanna) |
| Indie pop | 3 | Geronimo (Sheppard); Say Something (A Great Big World featuring Christina Aguilera); Stolen Dance (Milky Chance) |
| Pop rock | 3 | Let It Go (Demi Lovato); She Looks So Perfect (5 Seconds Of Summer); We Are Done The Madden Brothers) |
| Power pop | 3 | Brave (Sara Bareilles); Roar (Katy Perry); She Looks So Perfect (5 Seconds Of Summer) |
| Blue-eyed soul | 2 | Don't (Ed Sheeran); Thinking Out Loud (Ed Sheeran) |
| Deep House | 2 | Rather Be (Clean Bandit featuring Jess Glynne); Waves (Robin Schulz Remix) (Mr Probz featuring Robin Schulz) |
| Electro-hop | 2 | Fancy (Iggy Azalea featuring Charli XCX); New Thang (Redfoo) |
| Folk | 2 | Free (Rudimental featuring Emeli Sandé); I See Fire (Ed Sheeran) |
| Folktronica | 2 | Stolen Dance (Milky Chance); Timber (Pitbull featuring Ke$ha) |
| House | 2 | Addicted To You (Avicii featuring Audra Mae); Hey Brother (Avicii featuring Dan Tyminski) |
| Synthpop | 2 | Bridges (Broods); Rather Be (Clean Bandit featuring Jess Glynne) |

=== Top Label ===
The following shows the most common record labels that a single was associated with. Any label that only had one single has not been noted.

| Label | Total | Singles |
|---|---|---|
| Atlantic Records | 6 | Don't (Ed Sheeran); Free (Rudimental featuring Emeli Sandé); Rather Be (Clean Bandit featuring Jess Glynne); Sing (Ed Sheeran); Thinking Out Loud (Ed Sheeran); Trumpets (Jason Derulo) |
| Capitol Records | 6 | Dark Horse (Katy Perry featuring Juicy J); I’m Not the Only One (Ed Sheeran); Roar (Katy Perry); She Looks So Perfect (5 Seconds Of Summer); Stay with Me (Sam Smith); We Are Done (The Madden Brothers) |
| RCA Records | 6 | Chandelier (Sia); Not a Bad Thing (Justin Timberlake); Only Love Can Hurt Like This (Paloma Faith); Rude (Magic!); Timber (Pitbull featuring Ke$ha); Ugly Heart (G.R.L.) |
| Columbia Records | 5 | All of Me (John Legend); Budapest (George Ezra); Happy (Pharrell Williams); I Will Never Let You Down (Rita Ora); Turn Down for What (DJ Snake & Lil Jon) |
| Republic Records | 5 | Bang Bang (Jessie J), Ariana Grande & Nicki Minaj); Blank Space (Taylor Swift); Nobody to Love (Sigma featuring Daniel Pearce); Problem (Ariana Grande featuring Iggy Azalea); Stolen Dance (Milky Chance) |
| Asylum Records | 4 | Don't (Ed Sheeran); Free Rudimental featuring Emeli Sandé); Sing (Ed Sheeran featuring Pharrell Williams); Thinking Out Loud (Ed Sheeran) |
| Epic Records | 4 | All About That Bass (Meghan Trainor); Brave (Sara Bareilles); Say Something (A Great Big World featuring Christina Aguilera); Waves (Robin Schulz Remix) (Mr Probz featuring Robin Schulz) |
| Universal Music | 4 | Bridges (Broods); Freaks (Timmy Trumpet & Savage); Habits (Stay High) (Hippie Sabotage Remix) (Tove Lo featuring Hippie Sabotage); Hey BrotherAvicii featuring Dan Tyminski) |
| Island Records | 3 | Addicted To You (Avicii featuring Audra Mae); Bridges (Broods); Nobody to Love (Sigma featuring Daniel Pearce) |
| Sony Music Entertainment | 3 | Budapest (George Ezra); Holding You (Ginny Blackmore & Stan Walker); Rude (Magic!) |
| Big Machine Records | 2 | Blank Space (Taylor Swift); Shake It Off (Taylor Swift) |
| Def Jam Recordings | 2 | Black Widow (Iggy Azalea featuring Rita Ora); Fancy (Iggy Azalea featuring Charli XCX) |
| Interscope Records | 2 | The Man (Aloe Blacc); The Monster (Eminem featuring Rihanna) |
| PRMD Music | 2 | Addicted To You (Avicii featuring Audra Mae); Hey Brother (Avicii featuring Dan Tyminski) |

=== Top songwriters ===
The following shows the songwriters who had the most top-selling singles of 2014 in New Zealand.

| Songwriter | Total | Singles |
|---|---|---|
| Max Martin | 6 | Bang Bang (Jessie J, Ariana Grande & Nicki Minaj); Blank Space (Taylor Swift); Dark Horse (Katy Perry featuring Juicy J); Problem (Ariana Grande featuring Iggy Azalea); Roar (Katy Perry); Shake It Off (Taylor Swift) |
| Ed Sheeran | 4 | Don't (Ed Sheeran); I See Fire (Ed Sheeran); Sing (Ed Sheeran); Thinking Out Loud (Ed Sheeran) |
| Henry Walter | 4 | Dark Horse (Katy Perry featuring Juicy J); Roar (Katy Perry); Timber (Pitbull featuring Ke$ha); Ugly Heart (G.R.L.) |
| Lukasz Gottwald | 4 | Dark Horse (Katy Perry featuring Juicy J); Roar (Katy Perry); Timber (Pitbull) featuring Ke$ha); Ugly Heart (G.R.L.) |
| Amethyst Amelia Kelly | 3 | Black Widow (Iggy Azalea featuring Rita Ora); Fancy(Iggy Azalea featuring Charli XCX); Problem (Ariana Grande featuring Iggy Azalea) |
| James Napier | 3 | I’m Not the Only One (Sam Smith); Rather Be (Clean Bandit featuring Jess Glynne); Stay with Me (Sam Smith) |
| Katheryn Hudson | 3 | Black Widow (Iggy Azalea featuring Rita Ora); Dark Horse (Katy Perry featuring Juicy J); Roar (Katy Perry) |
| Tim Bergling | 3 | A Sky Full Of Stars (Coldplay); Addicted To You (Avicii featuring Audra Mae); Hey Brother (Avicii featuring Dan Tyminski) |
| Benjamin Levin | 2 | Black Widow (Iggy Azalea featuring Rita Ora; Don't (Ed Sheeran) |
| John Stephens | 2 | All of Me (John Legend); Nobody to Love (Sigma featuring Daniel Pearce) |
| Jon Bellion | 2 | The Monster (Eminem featuring Rihanna); Trumpets (Jason Derulo) |
| Pharrell Williams | 2 | Happy (Pharrell Williams); Sing (Ed Sheeran featuring Pharrell Williams) |
| Sam Smith | 2 | I’m Not the Only One (Sam Smith); Stay with Me (Sam Smith) |
| Sarah Hudson | 2 | Black Widow (Iggy Azalea featuring Rita Ora); Dark Horse (Katy Perry featuring Juicy J) |
| Savan Kotecha | 2 | Bang Bang (Jessie J, Ariana Grande & Nicki Minaj); Problem (Ariana Grande featuring Iggy Azalea) |
| Karl Schuster | 2 | Blank Space (Taylor Swift); Shake It Off (Taylor Swift) |
| Taylor Swift | 2 | Blank Space (Taylor Swift); Shake It Off (Taylor Swift) |

=== Most/Least songwriters ===
The following shows the singles that were credited as having been written by only one person and the singles that had the most credited writers of 2014.

| Single | Total | Songwriter/s |
|---|---|---|
| Happy (Pharrell Williams song) (Pharrell Williams) | 1 | Pharrell Williams |
| I See Fire (Ed Sheeran) | 1 | Ed Sheeran |
| I Will Never Let You Down (Rita Ora) | 1 | Calvin Harris |
| New Thang (Redfoo) | 1 | Stefan Gordy |
| Only Love Can Hurt Like This (Paloma Faith) | 1 | Diane Warren |
| Turn Down for What (DJ Snake & Lil Jon) | 1 | William Grigahcine |
| Waves (Robin Schulz Remix) (Mr Probz featuring Robin Schulz) | 1 | Dennis Princewell Stehr |
| Timber (Pitbull featuring Ke$ha) | 13 | Henry Walter; Lukasz Gottwald; Aaron Davis Arnold; Armando Pérez; Breyan Stanley Isaac; Charles Carter; Greg Errico; Jamie Sanderson; Keri Oskar; Kesha Sebert; Lee Oskar; Pebe Sebert; Priscilla Hamilton; Roger Parker; Steve Arrington |

=== Top producers ===
The following shows the producers who had the most singles to appear on this chart.

| Producer | Total | Singles |
|---|---|---|
| Max Martin | 6 | Bang Bang (Jessie J, Ariana Grande & Nicki Minaj); Blank Space (Taylor Swift); Dark Horse Katy Perry featuring Juicy J Problem (Ariana Grande featuring Iggy Azalea); Roar (Katy Perry); Shake It Off (Taylor Swift) |
| Henry Walter | 4 | Dark Horse Katy Perry featuring Juicy J Roar (Katy Perry); Timber (Pitbull featuring Ke$ha); Ugly Heart (G.R.L.) |
| Lukasz Gottwald | 4 | Dark Horse Katy Perry featuring Juicy J Roar (Katy Perry); Timber (Pitbull featuring Ke$ha); Ugly Heart (G.R.L.) |
| Karl Schuster | 3 | Blank Space (Taylor Swift); Problem (Ariana Grande featuring Iggy Azalea); Shake It Off (Taylor Swift) |
| Tim Bergling | 3 | A Sky Full Of Stars (Coldplay); Addicted To You (Avicii featuring Audra Mae); Hey Brother (Avicii featuring Dan Tyminski) |
| Eric Valentine | 2 | She Looks So Perfect (5 Seconds Of Summer); We Are Done (The Madden Brothers) |
| Ilya Salmanzadeh | 2 | Bang Bang (Jessie J, Ariana Grande & Nicki Minaj); Problem (Ariana Grande featuring Iggy Azalea) |
| James Napier | 2 | I’m Not the Only One (Sam Smith); Stay with Me (Sam Smith) |
| Pharrell Williams | 2 | Happy (Pharrell Williams); Sing (Ed Sheeran featuring Pharrell Williams) |
| Steve Fitzmaurice | 2 | I’m Not the Only One (Sam Smith); Stay with Me (Sam Smith) |
