= 2014 New Zealand Music Awards =

Annual New Zealand music awards ceremony

- Awarded for: Excellence in New Zealand music
- Sponsored by: Vodafone
- Date: 20 November 2014
- Location: Vector Arena, Auckland
- Country: New Zealand
- Hosted by: Shannon Ryan and Dai Henwood
- Reward: Tui award trophy
- Website: http://www.nzmusicawards.co.nz

Television/radio coverage
- Network: Four

The 2014 New Zealand Music Awards was the 48th holding of the annual ceremony featuring awards for musical recording artists based in or originating from New Zealand. It took place on 20 November 2014 at Vector Arena in Auckland. The awards show was screened on channel Four, the first time the event was broadcast live.

The technical award winners, legacy award recipient and the Critics' Choice Prize shortlist were announced on 16 October at the Pullman hotel, Auckland. The Critics Choice showcase and award presentation were held on 29 October at the King's Arms in Auckland.

The awards were dominated by Lorde, who won six awards, including Album of the Year, Single of the Year, Best Female Solo Artist, Best Pop Album, Highest Selling Single and the International Achievement Award.

== Early awards ==
While most of the awards were presented at the main awards ceremony held in November, five genre awards were presented earlier at ceremonies of their field. The first was awarded in January, with the Tui for Best Folk Album presented at the Auckland Folk Festival in Kumeu to Auckland duo Tattletale Saints for their album How Red Is the Blood. The Tui for Best Jazz Album was presented in March to Nathan Haines at the National Jazz Festival in Tauranga for his album Vermillion Skies. This was Haines' third Tui for Best Jazz Album, after previously winning in 2013 and 1996. The Tui for Best Pacific Music Album was presented in May to operatic pop trio Sol3 Mio for their self-titled album. The Best Country Music Album Tui was presented in May at the New Zealand Country Music Awards in Gore to Kaylee Bell for her album Heart First. In July the Best Children's Music Album award was presented live on What Now to Anika Moa for her album Songs For Bubbas.

== Nominees and winners ==
Winners are listed first and highlighted in boldface.

Key
‡ – Technical award

Album of the Year	Single of the Year
Sponsored by Mentos: **Lorde – Pure Heroine**; Tiny Ruins – Brightly Painted One; The Naked and Famous – In Rolling Waves; Sol3 Mio – Sol3 Mio; Ladi6 – Automatic	Sponsored by Vodafone: **Lorde – "Team"**; Broods – "Bridges"; David Dallas – "Runnin'"; The Naked and Famous – "Hearts Like Ours"; Ladi6 – "Diamonds"
Best Group	Breakthrough Artist of the Year
Sponsored by Steinlager Pure: **The Naked and Famous – In Rolling Waves**; Sol3 Mio – Sol3 Mio; @Peace – @Peace and the Plutonian Noise Symphony	**Broods**; Sol3 Mio; Doprah
Best Male Solo Artist	Best Female Solo Artist
**David Dallas – Falling into Place**; Liam Finn – The Nihilist; Stan Walker – Inventing Myself	**Lorde – Pure Heroine**; Ladi6 – Automatic; Tiny Ruins – Brightly Painted Ones
Best Rock Album	Best Pop Album
**Blacklistt – Blacklistt**; Clap Clap Riot – Nobody/Everybody; Ekko Park – Tomorrow Tomorrow Today	Sponsored by The Edge: **Lorde – Pure Heroine**; Stan Walker – Inventing Myself; Benny Tipene – Toulouse
Best Urban/Hip Hop Album	Best Roots Album
**David Dallas – Falling into Place**; Ladi6 – Automatic; PNC – The Codes	**Tama Waipara – Fill Up the Silence**; Mark Vanilau – Dark Horizon; House of Shem – Harmony
Best Alternative Album	Best Māori Album
**Tiny Ruins – Brightly Painted Ones**; Liam Finn – The Nihilist; Grayson Gilmour – Infinite Life!	**Rob Ruha – Tiki Tapu**; Tama Waipara – Fill Up the Silence; House of Shem – Harmony
Best Music Video	Best Electronica Album
Sponsored by NZ On Air: **Campbell Hooper – "Hearts Like Ours" (The Naked and Famous)**; Tom Gould – "Runnin'" (David Dallas); Thunderlips – "Stranger People" (Doprah)	**Opiuo – Meraki**; Bulletproof – #Listen; Sorceress – Dose
Best Gospel / Christian Album	Best Classical Album
**Mosaic Music – You Surround**; Lifestyle (of Worship) – Lifestyle (of Worship); Saving Grace – The Urgency	**Jack Body – Poems of Love & War**; Voices 16 – Voice of the Soul; Gillian Whitehead – Alice
People's Choice Award	Critics' Choice Prize
Sponsored by Vodafone: **Stan Walker**; Lorde; Sol3 Mio; David Dallas; Broods	Presented 29 October 2014: **Randa**; Estere; Lake South
Highest selling New Zealand Single	Highest selling New Zealand Album
Sponsored by Vodafone No finalists are announced in this category.: **Lorde – "Royals"**	Sponsored by FOUR No finalists are announced in this category.: **Sol3 Mio – Sol3 Mio**
Radio Airplay Record of the Year	International Achievement Award
Sponsored by NZ On Air No finalists are announced in this category.: **Stan Walker – "Bulletproof"**	No finalists are announced in this category.: **Lorde**
Legacy Award	Best Album Cover‡
Sponsored by The New Zealand Herald; No finalists are announced in this category. Announced 16 October 2014: **Supergroove**	Presented 16 October 2014: **Anna Taylor and Ken Clark for Liam Finn – The Nihilist**; Henrietta Harris for Grayson Gilmour – Infinite Life!; Robert Wallace for Ladi6 – Automatic
Best Engineer‡	Best Producer‡
Presented 16 October 2014: **Joel Little for Lorde – Pure Heroine**; Doug Jane for Kiri Te Kanawa – Waiata; Hayden Taylor for Blacklistt – Blacklistt	Presented 16 October 2014: **Joel Little for Lorde – Pure Heroine**; Thomas Healy for Tiny Ruins – Brightly Painted One; Thom Powers for The Naked and Famous – In Rolling Waves
Best Folk Album	Best Jazz Album
Presented 26 January 2014: **Tattletale Saints – How Red Is the Blood**; Chris Priestley – Unsung Heroes; Into The East – Fight From the Inside	Presented 18 March 2014: **Nathan Haines – Vermillion Skies**; Phil Broadhurt – Flaubert’s Dance; Reuben Bradley – Mantis: The Music of Drew Menzies
Best Pacific Music Album	Best Country Music Album
Presented 8 May 2014: **Sol3 Mio – Sol3 Mio**; David Dallas – Falling into Place; Ladi6 – Automatic	Presented 23 May 2014: **Kaylee Bell – Heart First**; Anna van Riel – Whistle and Hum; Marian Burns – The Paris Sessions
Best Children's Music Album	
Presented 20 July 2014: **Anika Moa – Songs For Bubbas**; Hayley Westenra – Hushabye; Roger Lusby – Magical Places	

== Presenters and performers ==
=== Presenters ===
Presenters of awards:

- Shannon Ryan and Dai Henwood – Highest Selling Single, Highest Selling Album and Airplay Record of the Year
- Sweet Mix Kids – Best Electronica Album
- Natalia Kills and Willy Moon – Best Urban/Hip Hop Album and Best Pop Album
- Lizzie Marvelly – Best Classical Album
- Jono Pryor and Ben Boyce – Best Group and Best Rock Album
- Brooke Duff – Best Gospel/Christian Album
- Guy Williams and Rose Matafeo – Best Male Solo Artist and Best Female Solo Artist
- Maisey Rika – Best Māori Album
- Damian Vaughn – International Achievement Award
- Hollie Smith – Best Roots Album
- Jeremy Corbett and Paul Ego – Best Alternative Album
- Jamie McDell – Best Music Video
- Maria Tutaia – Breakthrough Artist of the Year
- Slave & Otis – Legacy Award
- James Rolleston – People's Choice Award
- Jon Toogood – Single of the Year and Album of the Year

=== Performers ===
Performers at the ceremony:

- David Dallas – "Runnin'"
- Benny Tipene – "Make You Mine"
- Sol3 Mio – "’O sole mio"
- Tiny Ruins – "Me at the Museum, You in the Wintergardens"
- Blacklistt – "Burn"
- Broods – "Bridges"
- Super-Sista-Groove featuring Hollie Smith, MC Tali, Iva Lamkum, Ria Hall and The Levites – "Can't Get Enough"
