= Benny Tipene discography =

- Studio albums: 1
- EPs: 1
- Singles: 8
- Music videos: 4
- Demos: 7

The discography of Benny Tipene, a New Zealand singer-songwriter, contains one studio album, one EP, eight singles, four music videos, six demo releases and one demo compilation.

Tipene's debut single "Make You Mine" was No.9 in Recorded Music NZ's 2013 year-end chart of singles by New Zealand artists. He also had three singles feature in the 2014 year-end chart: "Make You Mine" (No.8), "Lonely" (No.11) and "Step on Up" (No.12). In the year-end chart of albums by New Zealand artists, Tipene's EP Toulouse was No.9.

== Albums ==
=== Studio albums ===
List of albums, with selected chart positions
Title	Album details	Peak chart positions
Title	Album details	NZ
Bricks	Released: 17 October 2014; Label: Sony; Format: CD, digital download	4
"—" denotes a recording that did not chart or was not released in that territory.

=== Extended plays ===
List of extend plays, with selected chart positions
Title	Album details	Peak chart positions
Title	Album details	NZ
Toulouse	Released: 28 February 2014; Label: Sony; Format: CD, digital download	4
"—" denotes a recording that did not chart or was not released in that territory.

== Singles ==
=== As lead artist ===
List of singles, with selected chart positions
Title	Year	Peak chart positions		Certifications	Album
Title	Year	NZ	AUS	Certifications	Album
"Walking on Water"	2013	2	—	RMNZ: Gold	Toulouse
"Laura" (Live)	2013	33	—		—
"Make You Mine"	2013	15	56	RMNZ: Gold	Toulouse
"Lonely"	2014	24	—		Toulouse
"Step on Up"	2014	10	—	RMNZ: Gold	Bricks
"Good Man"	2014	—	—		Bricks
"Lanterns"	2015	—	—		Bricks
"This Is Where Love Comes From"	2016	—	—		—
"—" denotes a recording that did not chart or was not released in that territory.

=== As featured artist ===
List of singles as featured artist, with selected chart positions
Title	Year	Peak chart positions	Album
Title	Year	NZ	Album
"Pull Out Ya Voucher" (Dominic Harvey featuring Benny Tipene and PNC)	2014	— (Note: "Pull Out Ya Voucher" did not enter the Official New Zealand Music Chart, but peaked at number 5 on the New Zealand Artists chart.)	—
"—" denotes a recording that did not chart or was not released in that territory.

== Other appearances ==
List of other appearances, showing year released and album
Title	Year	Album
"Our Photograph" (Kara Gordon and Barnaby Weir featuring Benny Tipene)	2014	The Berry Boys (Soundtrack)

== Demos ==
List of demos
Title	Album details
Room Demo Live	Released: 13 March 2012; Label: Self-released; Format: Digital download
Room Demo Live 2	Released: 2012; Label: Self-released; Format: Digital download
Room Demo Live 3	Released: 2012; Label: Self-released; Format: Digital download
Room Demo Live Complete	Released: 10 July 2012; Label: Self-released; Format: Digital download
Benny Tipene	Released: 14 August 2012; Label: Self-released; Format: Digital download
Room Demo Live 4	Released: 11 September 2012; Label: Self-released; Format: Digital download
Tummy Demo Live	Released: 5 February 2013; Label: Self-released; Format: Digital download

== Music videos ==
List of music videos, showing year released and director
Title	Year	Director	Notes
"Make You Mine"	2014	Sam Kristofski	
"Lonely"	2014	Alexander Hoyles	
"Step on Up"	2014	Anita Ward	
"Good Man"	2014	Anita Ward	Features young dancer Fynn Ellison.
