= List of number-one singles from the 2010s (New Zealand) =

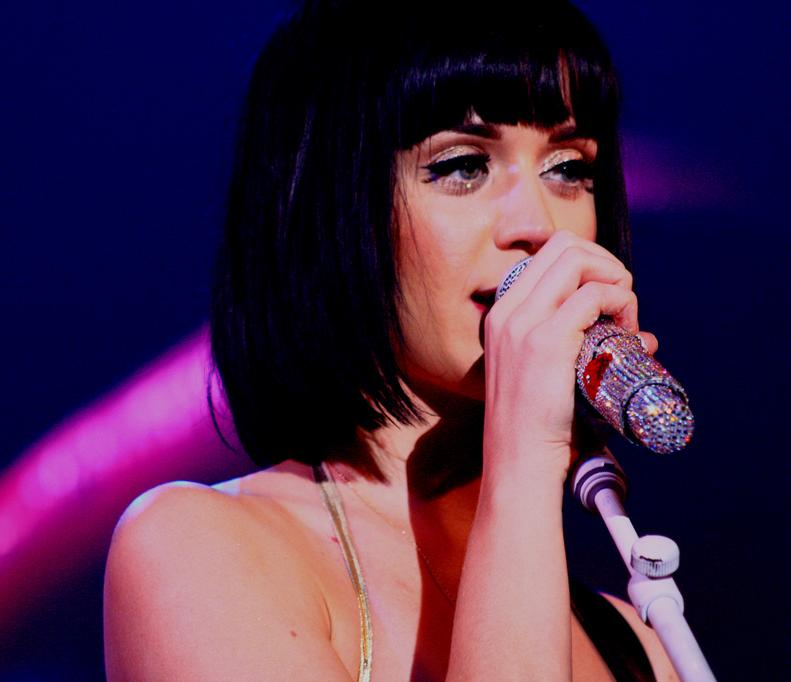
Katy Perry has achieved eight number-one singles this decade, the most of any artist.

This is the Recorded Music NZ list of number-one singles in New Zealand during the 2010s decade, starting from Monday 4 January 2010. From 7 November 2014, the chart also included data from audio on demand streaming services.

== Chart ==
Key

* – Number-one single of the year (Note: Annual charts are sourced from the RIANZ website: "Annual Top 50 Singles Chart 2010")
† – Song of New Zealand origin (Note: Whether or not a song is of New Zealand origin is determined by the RMNZ)
‡ – Number-one single of the year, of New Zealand origin

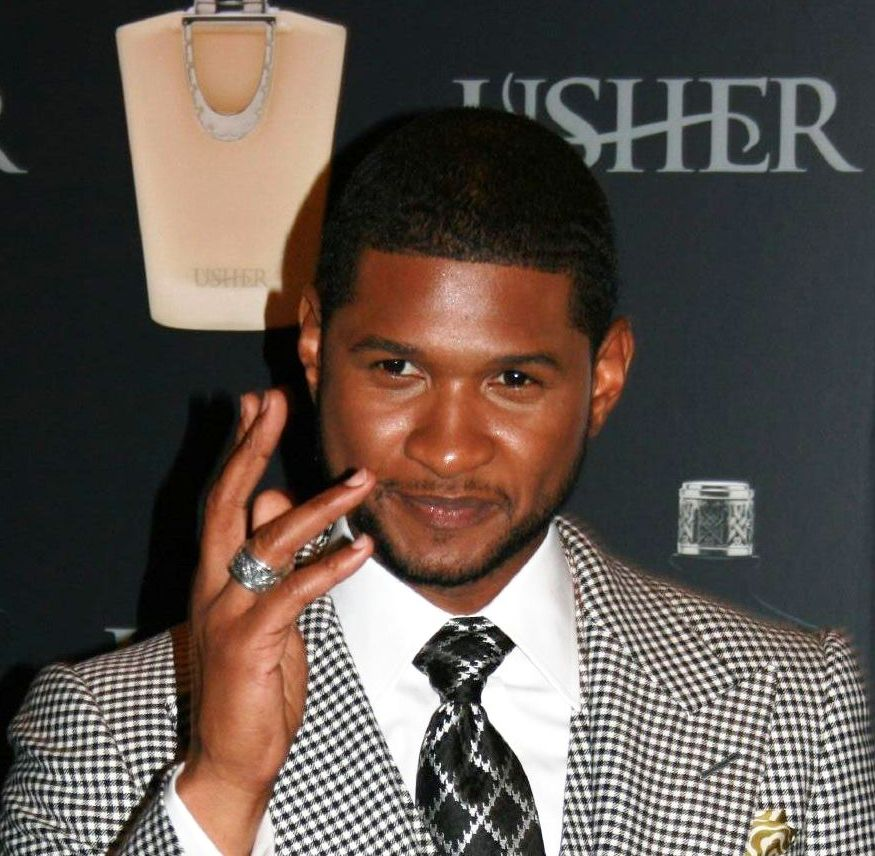
Usher's fourth NZ number-one single was "OMG", which featured will.i.am.

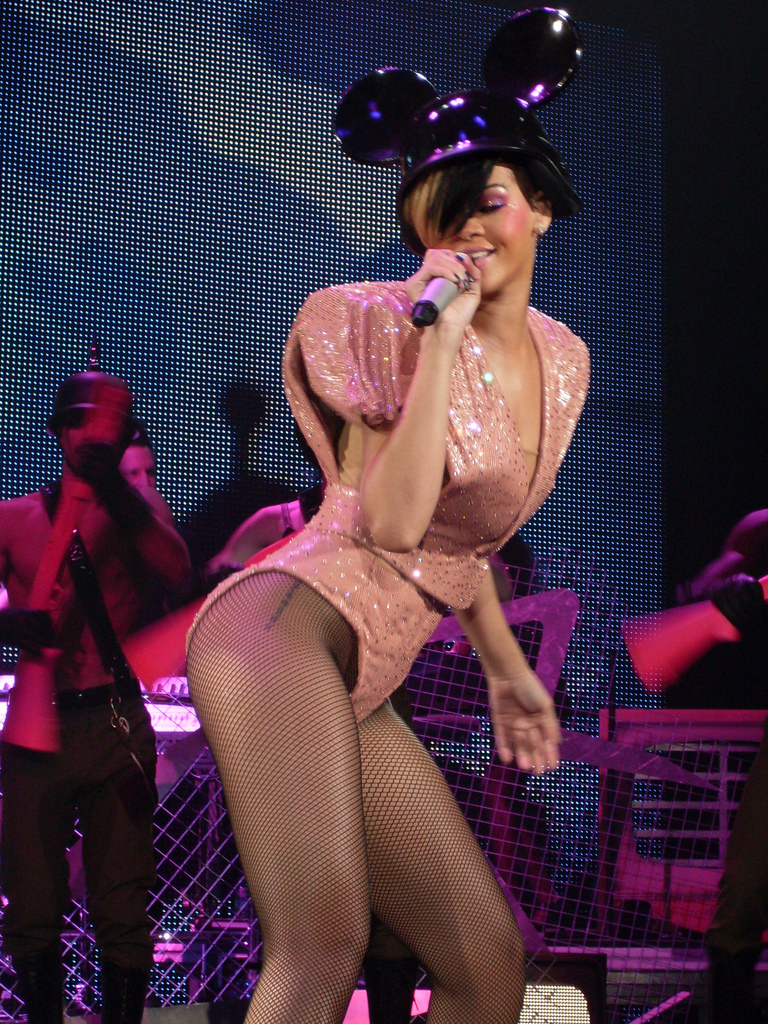
Rihanna has had number-one singles with "FourFiveSeconds", "Love the Way You Lie", "Only Girl (In the World)", "The Monster" and "We Found Love".

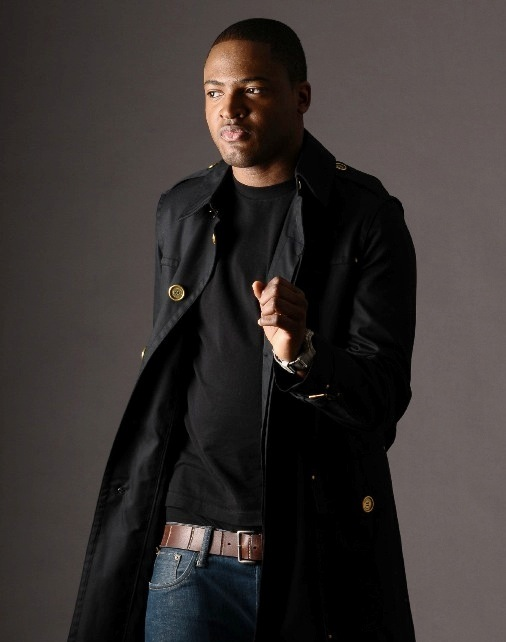
Taio Cruz had his first number-one single in 2010; "Dynamite" spent two weeks at number one.

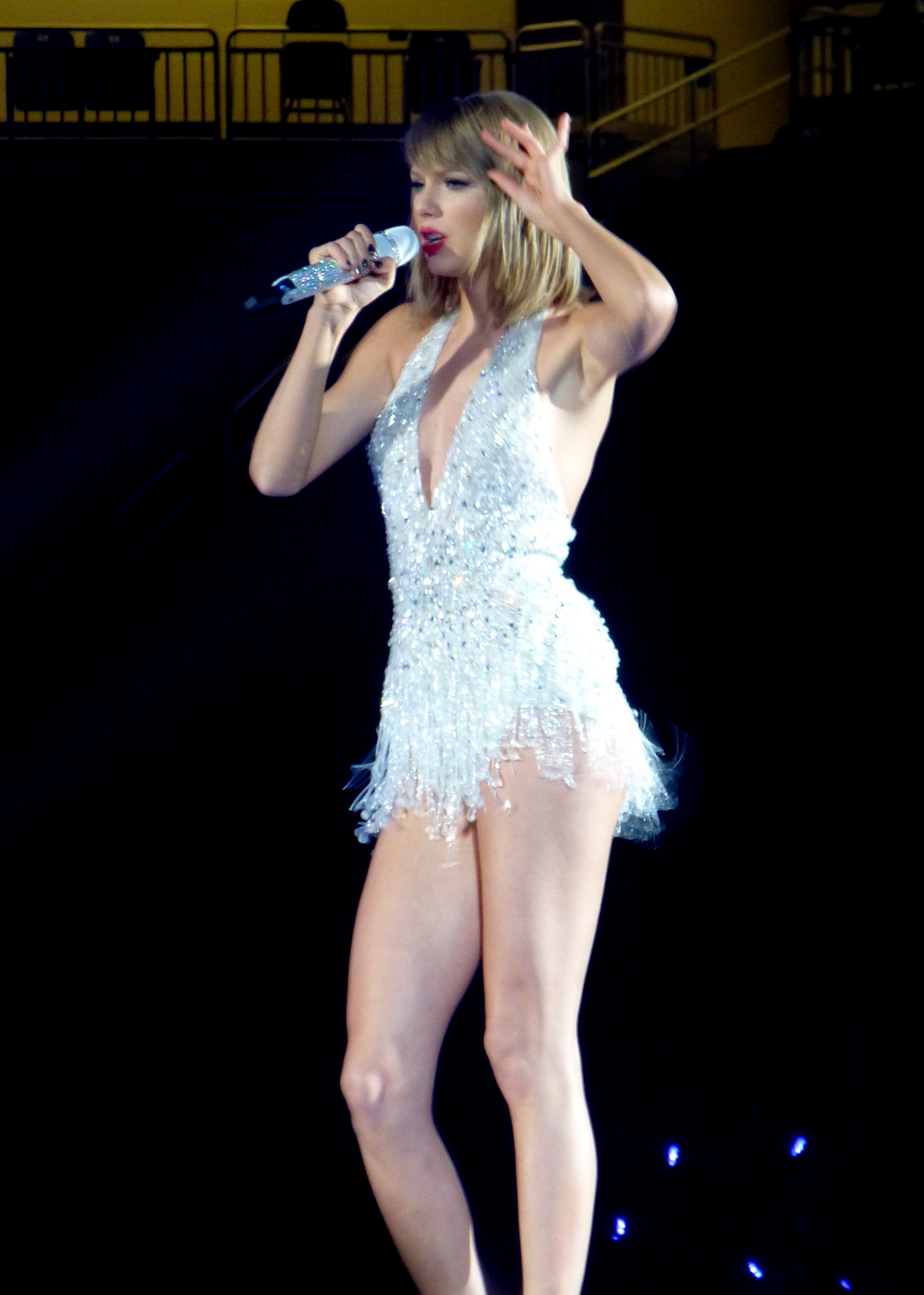
Taylor Swift has achieved four number one singles in this decade with her songs "We Are Never Ever Getting Back Together", "Shake It Off", "Bad Blood" and "Look What You Made Me Do".

Artist	Title	Weeks at number-one (Note: The date given is the day when the chart was published. The reporting period is from the preceding week, which is Monday to Sunday. Therefore, the date given is the day after the reporting period ended.)	Reached number-one	Reference
Stan Walker	"Black Box"†	10	7 December 2009	
Timbaland featuring Katy Perry	"If We Ever Meet Again"	4	15 February 2010	
J.Williams featuring Scribe	"You Got Me"‡	4	15 March 2010	
Usher featuring will.i.am	"OMG"	4	12 April 2010	
B.o.B featuring Hayley Williams	"Airplanes"	5	10 May 2010	
The Naked and Famous	"Young Blood"†	2	14 June 2010	
Katy Perry featuring Snoop Dogg	"California Gurls"	3	28 June 2010	
Eminem featuring Rihanna	"Love the Way You Lie"	4	19 July 2010	
Taio Cruz	"Dynamite"	2	16 August 2010	
Katy Perry	"Teenage Dream"	4	30 August 2010	
Rihanna	"Only Girl (In the World)"	1	27 September 2010	
Bruno Mars	"Just the Way You Are"	2	4 October 2010	
Brooke Fraser	"Something in the Water"†	1	18 October 2010	
Far East Movement featuring The Cataracs and Dev	"Like a G6"	3	25 October 2010	
Katy Perry	"Firework"	3	14 November 2010	
The Black Eyed Peas	"The Time (Dirty Bit)"	2	6 December 2010	
Bruno Mars	"Grenade"	3	20 December 2010	
Artist	Title	Weeks at number-one	Reached number-one	Reference
Chris Brown	"Yeah 3x"	1	10 January 2011	
Britney Spears	"Hold It Against Me"	1	17 January 2011	
Six60	"Rise Up 2.0"†	1	24 January 2011	
Katy Perry featuring Kanye West	"E.T."	1	31 January 2011	
Guy Sebastian featuring Eve	"Who's That Girl"	1	7 February 2011	
Lady Gaga	"Born This Way"	2	14 February 2011	
Jessie J featuring B.o.B	"Price Tag"	2	28 February 2011	
Avalanche City	"Love Love Love"†	3	14 March 2011	
LMFAO featuring Lauren Bennett & GoonRock	"Party Rock Anthem"	11	4 April 2011	
Adele	"Someone Like You"	2	20 June 2011	
Cobra Starship featuring Sabi	"You Make Me Feel..."	1	4 July 2011	
Adele	"Someone Like You"	3	11 July 2011	
Maroon 5 featuring Christina Aguilera	"Moves Like Jagger"	6	1 August 2011	
Gotye featuring Kimbra	"Somebody That I Used to Know"†	6	12 September 2011	
Rihanna featuring Calvin Harris	"We Found Love"	9	24 October 2011	
LMFAO	"Sexy and I Know It"	2	26 December 2011	
Artist	Title	Weeks at number-one	Reached number-one	Reference
Flo Rida featuring Sia	"Wild Ones"	6	9 January 2012	
Katy Perry	"Part of Me"	1	20 February 2012	
Reece Mastin	"Good Night"	2	27 February 2012	
K'naan featuring Nelly Furtado	"Is Anybody Out There"	1	12 March 2012	
Chris Rene	"Young Homie"	1	19 March 2012	
Carly Rae Jepsen	"Call Me Maybe"	5	26 March 2012	
Reece Mastin	"Shut Up & Kiss Me"	1	30 April 2012	
Flo Rida	"Whistle"	8	6 May 2012	
Katy Perry	"Wide Awake"	1	2 July 2012	
Owl City & Carly Rae Jepsen	"Good Time"	1	9 July 2012	
Katy Perry	"Wide Awake"	1	16 July 2012	
Fun	"Some Nights"	2	23 July 2012	
Maroon 5	"One More Night"	3	6 August 2012	
Taylor Swift	"We Are Never Ever Getting Back Together"	1	27 August 2012	
Flight of the Conchords	"Feel Inside (And Stuff Like That)"†	2	3 September 2012	
Titanium	"Come On Home"†	1	17 September 2012	
Psy	"Gangnam Style"	2	24 September 2012	
One Direction	"Live While We're Young"	1	8 October 2012	
Psy	"Gangnam Style"	4	15 October 2012	
Macklemore & Ryan Lewis featuring Wanz	"Thrift Shop"	6	12 November 2012	
will.i.am featuring Britney Spears	"Scream & Shout"	1	24 December 2012	
Macklemore & Ryan Lewis featuring Wanz	"Thrift Shop"	3	31 December 2012	
Artist	Title	Weeks at number-one	Reached number-one	Reference
will.i.am featuring Britney Spears	"Scream & Shout"	1	21 January 2013	
Macklemore & Ryan Lewis featuring Mary Lambert	"Same Love"	3	28 January 2013	
Pink featuring Nate Ruess	"Just Give Me a Reason"	1	18 February 2013	
Baauer	"Harlem Shake"	1	25 February 2013	
Pink featuring Nate Ruess	"Just Give Me a Reason"	2	4 March 2013	
Lorde	"Royals"†	3	18 March 2013	
Passenger	"Let Her Go"	2	8 April 2013	
Robin Thicke featuring T.I. and Pharrell Williams	"Blurred Lines"*	8	22 April 2013	
Lorde	"Tennis Court"†	1	17 June 2013	
Robin Thicke featuring T.I. and Pharrell Williams	"Blurred Lines"	3	24 June 2013	
Miley Cyrus	"We Can't Stop"	1	15 July 2013	
Ginny Blackmore	"Bones"†	1	22 July 2013	
Jackie Thomas	"It's Worth It"†	2	29 July 2013	
Avicii	"Wake Me Up!"	1	12 August 2013	
Katy Perry	"Roar"	11	19 August 2013	
One Direction	"Story of My Life"	1	4 November 2013	
Eminem featuring Rihanna	"The Monster"	3	11 November 2013	
One Direction	"Strong"	1	2 December 2013	
Eminem featuring Rihanna	"The Monster"	1	9 December 2013	
Ed Sheeran	"I See Fire"	3	16 December 2013	
Artist	Title	Weeks at number-one	Reached number-one	Reference
Pharrell Williams	"Happy"	12	6 January 2014	
5 Seconds of Summer	"She Looks So Perfect"	1	31 March 2014	
Pharrell Williams	"Happy"	1	7 April 2014	
Ginny Blackmore and Stan Walker	"Holding You"†	1	14 April 2014	
Pharrell Williams	"Happy"	2	21 April 2014	
Ariana Grande featuring Iggy Azalea	"Problem"	1	5 May 2014	
Iggy Azalea featuring Charli XCX	"Fancy"	1	12 May 2014	
Sam Smith	"Stay with Me"	2	19 May 2014	
Sigma	"Nobody to Love"	1	2 June 2014	
Nico & Vinz	"Am I Wrong"	1	9 June 2014	
Sam Smith	"Stay with Me"	1	16 June 2014	
5 Seconds of Summer	"Don't Stop"	1	23 June 2014	
Nico & Vinz	"Am I Wrong"	1	30 June 2014	
Sam Smith	"Stay with Me"	1	7 July 2014	
Ed Sheeran	"Sing"	1	14 July 2014	
The Madden Brothers	"We Are Done"	3	21 July 2014	
George Ezra	"Budapest"	1	11 August 2014	
Meghan Trainor	"All About That Bass"	2	18 August 2014	
Taylor Swift	"Shake It Off"	1	1 September 2014	
Meghan Trainor	"All About That Bass"	2	8 September 2014	
Taylor Swift	"Shake It Off"	1	22 September 2014	
Meghan Trainor	"All About That Bass"	2	29 September 2014	
Ed Sheeran	"Thinking Out Loud"	4	13 October 2014	
Six60	"Special"†	1	10 November 2014	
Timmy Trumpet & Savage	"Freaks"†	5	17 November 2014	
Mark Ronson featuring Bruno Mars	"Uptown Funk" (Note: "Uptown Funk" was the No.1 single for 2015"This year's biggest albums and singles revealed". New Zealand Herald. 21 December 2015.)	9	22 December 2014	
Artist	Title	Weeks at number-one	Reached number-one	Reference
Ellie Goulding	"Love Me Like You Do"	2	23 February 2015	
Rihanna, Kanye West and Paul McCartney	"FourFiveSeconds"	5	9 March 2015	
Wiz Khalifa featuring Charlie Puth	"See You Again"	7	13 April 2015	
Taylor Swift featuring Kendrick Lamar	"Bad Blood"	1	1 June 2015	
Wiz Khalifa featuring Charlie Puth	"See You Again"	1	8 June 2015	
Charlie Puth featuring Meghan Trainor	"Marvin Gaye"	1	15 June 2015	
Major Lazer featuring MØ and DJ Snake	"Lean On"	1	22 June 2015	
Charlie Puth featuring Meghan Trainor	"Marvin Gaye"	1	29 June 2015	
Major Lazer featuring MØ and DJ Snake	"Lean On"	1	6 July 2015	
Avalanche City	"Inside Out"†	1	13 July 2015	
Meghan Trainor featuring John Legend	"Like I'm Gonna Lose You"	3	20 July 2015	
One Direction	"Drag Me Down"	1	10 August 2015	
The Weeknd	"Can't Feel My Face"	3	17 August 2015	
Justin Bieber	"What Do You Mean?"	8	7 September 2015	
Adele	"Hello"	3	2 November 2015	
Justin Bieber	"Sorry"	2	23 November 2015	
Justin Bieber	"Love Yourself"	10	7 December 2015	
Artist	Title	Weeks at number-one	Reached number-one	Reference
Zayn	"Pillowtalk"	1	15 February 2016	
Lukas Graham	"7 Years"	8	22 February 2016	
Fifth Harmony featuring Ty Dolla $ign	"Work from Home"	2	18 April 2016	
Drake featuring Wizkid and Kyla	"One Dance"	13	2 May 2016	
Major Lazer featuring Justin Bieber and MØ	"Cold Water"	4	1 August 2016	
The Chainsmokers featuring Halsey	"Closer"	8	29 August 2016	
The Weeknd featuring Daft Punk	"Starboy"	2	24 October 2016	
James Arthur	"Say You Won't Let Go"	3	7 November 2016	
Rae Sremmurd featuring Gucci Mane	"Black Beatles"	1	28 November 2016	
The Weeknd featuring Daft Punk	"Starboy"	3	5 December 2016	
Bruno Mars	"24K Magic"	2	26 December 2016	
Artist	Title	Weeks at number-one	Reached number-one	Reference
Clean Bandit featuring Sean Paul and Anne-Marie	"Rockabye"	1	9 January 2017	
Ed Sheeran	"Shape of You"	8	16 January 2017	
Lorde	"Green Light"†	1	13 March 2017	
Ed Sheeran	"Shape of You"	5	20 March 2017	
Kendrick Lamar	"Humble"	3	24 April 2017	
DJ Khaled featuring Justin Bieber, Quavo, Chance the Rapper and Lil Wayne	"I'm the One"	2	15 May 2017	
Luis Fonsi and Daddy Yankee featuring Justin Bieber	"Despacito (Remix)"	13	29 May 2017	
Macklemore featuring Skylar Grey	"Glorious"	1	28 August 2017	
Taylor Swift	"Look What You Made Me Do"	2	4 September 2017	
Sam Smith	"Too Good at Goodbyes"	1	18 September 2017	
Khalid	"Young Dumb & Broke"	1	25 September 2017	
Post Malone featuring 21 Savage	"Rockstar"	8	2 October 2017	
Post Malone	"I Fall Apart"	2	27 November 2017	
Ed Sheeran and Beyoncé	"Perfect Duet"	2	11 December 2017	
Ed Sheeran and Andrea Bocelli	"Perfect Symphony"	1	25 December 2017	
Artist	Title	Weeks at number-one	Reached number-one	Reference
Ed Sheeran	"Perfect"	5	1 January 2018	
Drake	"God's Plan"	9	5 February 2018	
Lil Dicky featuring Chris Brown	"Freaky Friday"	2	9 April 2018	
Drake	"Nice for What"	4	23 April 2018	
Childish Gambino	"This Is America"	2	21 May 2018	
Post Malone	"Better Now"	1	4 June 2018	
5 Seconds of Summer	"Youngblood"	4	11 June 2018	
Maroon 5 featuring Cardi B	"Girls Like You"	2	9 July 2018	
Drake	"In My Feelings"	5	23 July 2018	
Benny Blanco, Halsey and Khalid	"Eastside"	4	27 August 2018	
Kanye West and Lil Pump	"I Love It"	1	24 September 2018	
Lil Peep and XXXTentacion	"Falling Down"	1	1 October 2018	
George Ezra	"Shotgun"	4	8 October 2018	
Lady Gaga and Bradley Cooper	"Shallow"	2	5 November 2018	
Ariana Grande	"Thank U, Next"	6	19 November 2018	
Mariah Carey	"All I Want for Christmas Is You"	1	31 December 2018	
Artist	Title	Weeks at number-one	Reached number-one	Reference
Ava Max	"Sweet but Psycho"	1	7 January 2019	
Post Malone and Swae Lee	"Sunflower"	2	14 January 2019	
Ariana Grande	"7 Rings"	4	28 January 2019	
Ariana Grande	"Break Up with Your Girlfriend, I'm Bored"	3	25 February 2019	
Jonas Brothers	"Sucker"	1	18 March 2019	
Khalid and Disclosure	"Talk"	1	25 March 2019	
Post Malone	"Wow"	1	1 April 2019	
Billie Eilish	"Bad Guy"	1	8 April 2019	
Lil Nas X featuring Billy Ray Cyrus	"Old Town Road" (Remix)	12	15 April 2019	
Shawn Mendes and Camila Cabello	"Señorita"	9	8 July 2019	
Tones and I	"Dance Monkey"	1	9 September 2019	
Post Malone	"Circles"	1	16 September 2019	
Tones and I	"Dance Monkey"	8	23 September 2019	
Arizona Zervas	"Roxanne"	6	18 November 2019	
Mariah Carey	"All I Want for Christmas Is You"	1	30 December 2019	

== By artist ==
Key

† – Song of New Zealand origin

Artist	Number-one singles	Longest run	Total weeks at number one
Katy Perry	8	"Roar" (11 weeks)	24
Justin Bieber	6	"Despacito (Remix)" (13 weeks)	39
Post Malone	6	"Rockstar" (8 weeks)	15
Ed Sheeran	5	"Shape of You" (13 weeks)	29
Rihanna	5	"We Found Love" (9 weeks)	23
Drake	4	"One Dance" (13 weeks)	31
Bruno Mars	4	"Uptown Funk" (9 weeks)	16
Ariana Grande	4	"Thank U, Next" (6 weeks)	14
Taylor Swift	4	"Shake It Off" and "Look What You Made Me Do" (2 weeks)	6
One Direction	4	"Live While We're Young"/"Story of My Life"/"Strong"/"Drag Me Down" (1 week each)	4
Maroon 5	3	"Moves like Jagger" (6 weeks)	11
Meghan Trainor	3	"All About That Bass" (6 weeks)	11
Kanye West	3	"FourFiveSeconds" (5 weeks)	7
5 Seconds of Summer	3	"Youngblood" (4 weeks)	6
Khalid	3	"Eastside" (4 weeks)	6
Lorde	3	"Royals" (3 weeks)	5

== By song ==
Key

† – Song of New Zealand origin

Title	Artist	Reached number one	Weeks at number one
"Happy"	Pharrell Williams	6 January 2014	15
"One Dance"	Drake featuring Wizkid & Kyla	2 May 2016	13
"Shape of You"	Ed Sheeran	16 January 2017	13
"Despacito (Remix)"	Luis Fonsi and Daddy Yankee featuring Justin Bieber	29 May 2017	13
"Old Town Road" (Remix)	Lil Nas X featuring Billy Ray Cyrus	15 April 2019	12
"Party Rock Anthem"	LMFAO featuring Lauren Bennett & GoonRock	4 April 2011	11
"Roar"	Katy Perry	19 August 2013	11
"Blurred Lines"	Robin Thicke featuring T.I. and Pharrell Williams	22 April 2013	11
"Love Yourself"	Justin Bieber	7 December 2015	10
"Thrift Shop"	Macklemore & Ryan Lewis featuring Wanz	12 November 2012	10
"We Found Love"	Rihanna featuring Calvin Harris	24 October 2011	9
"Uptown Funk"	Mark Ronson featuring Bruno Mars	22 December 2014	9
"God's Plan"	Drake	5 February 2018	9
"Señorita"	Shawn Mendes and Camila Cabello	8 July 2019	9
"Dance Monkey"	Tones and I	9 September 2019	9
"Whistle"	Flo Rida	6 May 2012	8
"See You Again"	Wiz Khalifa featuring Charlie Puth	13 April 2015	8
"What Do You Mean?"	Justin Bieber	7 September 2015	8
"7 Years"	Lukas Graham	22 February 2016	8
"Closer"	The Chainsmokers featuring Halsey	29 August 2016	8
"Rockstar"	Post Malone featuring 21 Savage	2 October 2017	8
"Black Box"	Stan Walker	7 December 2009	6
"Moves like Jagger"	Maroon 5 featuring Christina Aguilera	1 August 2011	6
"Somebody That I Used to Know"	Gotye featuring Kimbra	12 September 2011	6
"Wild Ones"	Flo Rida featuring Sia	9 January 2012	6
"Gangnam Style"	Psy	24 September 2012	6
"All About That Bass"	Meghan Trainor	18 August 2014	6
"Thank U, Next"	Ariana Grande	19 November 2018	6
"Roxanne"	Arizona Zervas	18 November 2019	6
"Airplanes"	B.o.B featuring Hayley Williams	10 May 2010	5
"Call Me Maybe"	Carly Rae Jepsen	26 March 2012	5
"Someone Like You"	Adele	20 June 2011	5
"Freaks"	Timmy Trumpet featuring Savage	17 November 2014	5
"FourFiveSeconds"	Rihanna featuring Kanye West & Paul McCartney	9 March 2015	5
"Starboy"	The Weeknd featuring Daft Punk	24 October 2016	5
"Perfect"	Ed Sheeran	1 January 2018	5
"In My Feelings"	Drake	23 July 2018	5
