= Aeon Manahan =

Aeon 'Step' Manahan
- Also known as: Step
- Origin: London, England
- Genres: Pop; R&B; Hip hop
- Occupations: Music Producer, Songwriter, Performer
- Years active: 1998–Present
- Label: Sony Music Entertainment (2009–present)

Aeon 'Step' Manahan is a British songwriter, music producer and performer. He was born in London.

== Nine Yards ==
In 1998, Manahan signed a recording contract with Virgin Records UK Ltd as part of R&B group Nine Yards and released the album Where Do We Go From Here?, nominated for two MOBO awards in 1999. The lead single "Always Find a Way" featured remixes by J Dilla and Todd Terry. A white label remix featuring Craig David was also released in 1999.

== Music production ==
Working in studios across Europe and the United States, Manahan has written and / or produced tracks for a diverse range of international artists including Liberty X, HotCha, Willy Denzey, J-Son and Christina Aguilera.

In the latter part of 2009, he co-wrote and co-produced the track "Gotta Go", which featured on Overcome, the debut album from Alexandra Burke.

In May 2011, Busta Rhymes recorded a track over one of Manahan's beats while in Paris, France.

In June 2011, Manahan spent several days in the studio with artist Adam Lambert, recording, writing and producing "By the Rules", which features on the deluxe edition of Trespassing.

In August 2011, Manahan spent time in the studio in London with artist Pixie Lott, recording and producing new material.

In late 2011, Manahan spent time in the studio in Los Angeles, US with artist Christina Aguilera, recording and producing the track "Sing for Me", which features on Lotus, Christina's seventh studio album.

Manahan has worked extensively with Ginny Blackmore, working on tracks for her album, composing and producing her debut single "Bones". "Bones" entered the Billboard Music Charts at No. 40 for Adult Pop Songs in March 2013, reaching No. 1 on the Official New Zealand Music Chart in July 2013 and has since certified as double platinum. On 2 September 2016, UK artist Rebecca Ferguson released her cover of "Bones" as the debut single from her fourth studio album Superwoman. In 2014, Manahan co-produced the studio version of "Holding You", Blackmore's collaboration with fellow Kiwi artist Stan Walker, which also reached the top of the NZ chart.
