= Superwoman (Rebecca Ferguson album) =

Studio album by Rebecca Ferguson
- Released: 14 October 2016
- Recorded: 2015–16
- Length: 43:52
- Label: Simco; Sony; RCA
- Producer: Troy Miller; Phil Cook; Matt Prime

Rebecca Ferguson chronology
Lady Sings the Blues (2015)	Superwoman (2016)	Heaven Part II (2023)

Singles from Superwoman
- 1. "Bones" Released: 2 September 2016

Superwoman is the fourth studio album by English singer-songwriter Rebecca Ferguson, released on 14 October 2016 via Syco and Sony Music Entertainment. Prior to the announcement of the album, Ferguson had reportedly been working with producers such as Mark Ronson, Jonny Lattimer and Troy Miller. She embarked on the Superwoman Tour to promote the album, which began at Venue Cymru in Llandudno on the 23 October 2016.

== Singles ==
The lead single, "Bones", premiered on the Ken Bruce BBC Radio Two show on 1 September 2016. It was officially released on September 2, 2016. The song is a cover of Ginny Blackmore's of the same name, released in 2013. The single was produced by Troy Miller and Martin Cheung. On September 3, Ferguson performed the song on the BBC One reality TV show Strictly Come Dancing.

"Superwoman" was released as the 2nd single.

== Track listing ==
No.	Title	Writer(s)	Producer(s)	Length
1.	"Bones"	Virginia Blackmore; Aeon Manahan; Neil Carlill; William Foster; Danny Goffey; Pearl Lowe	Troy Miller	3:48
2.	"Mistress"	Rebecca Ferguson; Miller	Miller	3:19
3.	"Hold Me"	Ferguson; Miller	Miller	4:28
4.	"Superwoman"	Ferguson; James Earp; Negin Djafari	Miller	3:34
5.	"Stars"	Ferguson; Miller; Djafari	Miller	3:03
6.	"The Way You're Looking at Her"	Ferguson; Jonny Lattimer	Miller	4:10
7.	"Pay for It"	Ferguson; Lattimer; Francis White	Miller	3:16
8.	"Oceans"	Ferguson; Lattimer; Miller	Miller	3:22
9.	"Don't Want You Back"	Ferguson; Phil Cook; Chiara Hunter; Matt Prime; Sean McDonagh	Miller; Cook; Prime	3:14
10.	"Without a Woman"	Ferguson; Isabella Summers; Brad Balou; Wynter Gordon; Miller; Jem Cooke; Jennifer Decilveo	Miller	4:20
11.	"Waiting for Me"	Ferguson; Jake Gosling; Chris Leonard	Miller	3:50
12.	"I'll Meet You There"	Ferguson; Richey McCourt; Andrew Bannister	Miller	3:28
Total length:				43:52

== Charts ==
Chart (2016)	Peak position
Irish Albums (IRMA)	37
Scottish Albums (OCC)	7
Swiss Albums (Schweizer Hitparade)	91
UK Albums (OCC)	7
