= Bones (Ginny Blackmore song) =

2013 single by Ginny Blackmore

Single by Ginny Blackmore

from the album Over the Moon
- B-side: "Hello World"; "SFM"
- Released: 12 March 2013
- Genre: Pop
- Length: 4:00
- Label: Epic Records
- Songwriters: Virginia Blackmore; Aeon Manahan
- Producer: Manahan

Ginny Blackmore singles chronology
"Bones" (2013)	"Holding You" (2014)

"Bones" is the debut single by New Zealand singer-songwriter Ginny Blackmore. The pop ballad was released by Epic Records on 12 March 2013. It topped the New Zealand Singles Chart in July 2013 and appeared on two US Billboard charts: the Adult Pop Songs chart and the Dance Club Songs chart.

== Background and composition ==
"Bones" was written and recorded by Blackmore in one night in Los Angeles over one of Aeon 'Step' Manahan's musical compositions while she was experiencing a "girly, emotional moment". It is an R&B-influenced pop ballad. The song was released worldwide as a single via music download by Epic Records on 12 March 2013.

== Chart performance ==
In April 2013, "Bones" appeared on the US Adult Pop Songs chart at number 40, then peaked at number 30 on 1 June, eight weeks after its debut. In Blackmore's home country, "Bones" entered the New Zealand Singles Chart at number 34 on 24 June 2013 and reached number one on 22 July for one week. The song spent a total of 18 weeks in the top 40. It has been certified platinum by Recorded Music NZ for selling more than 15,000 copies and placed at number 21 on the list of top-selling New Zealand singles of 2013.

== Music video ==
The music video for "Bones" premiered on 1 May 2013. The black-and-white video shows couples being intimate with one another, cut with scenes of Blackmore singing to a man. In an interview, Blackmore stated that all of the people in the video were her friends, and not actors.

== Live performances ==
Blackmore performed "Bones" on the first season of New Zealand talent television show The X Factor on 15 July 2013, and later on morning news show Breakfast, on 17 July 2013.

== Track listings ==
Digital download

1. "Bones" - 4:00
2. "Hello World" - 3:42
3. "SFM" - 4:09

Remixes

1. "Bones" (Sidney Samson and Killfake remix) - 6:34
2. "Bones" (Reflex remix club edit) - 5:14
3. "Bones" (Reflex remix club edit instrumental) - 5:14
4. "Bones" (Reflex remix radio edit) - 4:28
5. "Bones" (Reflex remix radio edit instrumental) - 4:28
6. "Bones" (Kassiano remix) - 4:10
7. "Bones" (Kassiano extended remix) - 5:28
8. "Bones" (Kassiano remix instrumental) - 4:10

== Charts ==
=== Weekly charts ===
Chart (2013)	Peak position
New Zealand (Recorded Music NZ)	1
US Adult Pop Airplay (Billboard)	30
US Dance Club Songs (Billboard)	40

=== Year-end charts ===
Chart (2013)	Position
New Zealand (Recorded Music NZ)	21

== Certifications ==
Region	Certification	Certified units/sales
New Zealand (RMNZ)	2× Platinum	30,000^{*}
^{*} Sales figures based on certification alone.

== Rebecca Ferguson version ==
"Bones"

Single by Rebecca Ferguson

from the album Superwoman
- Released: 2 September 2016
- Recorded: 2015–2016
- Length: 3:49
- Label: Syco; Sony Music
- Songwriters: Virginia Blackmore; Aeon Manahan
- Producers: Troy Miller; Martin Cheung

Rebecca Ferguson singles chronology
"Get Happy" (2015)	"Bones" (2016)	"Superwoman" (2016)

"Bones" is a song by British recording artist Rebecca Ferguson for her fourth studio album, Superwoman. The track was written by Ginny Blackmore and Aeon Manahan. Production was handled by Troy Miller and Martin Cheung. It was released on 2 September 2016 as the lead single from the album, after premiering on the Ken Bruce BBC Radio Two show the day before. Ferguson also performed the song on the BBC One reality TV show Strictly Come Dancing.

=== Charts ===
Chart (2016)	Peak position
Russia (Tophit)	371
Scotland Singles (OCC)	67
UK Singles Downloads (OCC)	70
UK Singles Sales Chart (OCC)	71

=== Release history ===
Region	Date	Format(s)	Label	Ref.
Worldwide	2 September 2016	Digital download	Syco; Sony Music	

== See also ==
- List of number-one singles from the 2010s (New Zealand)
