= Benny Tipene =

- Born: Benjamin Tipene; 19 April 1990 (age 36); Auckland, Auckland Region, New Zealand
- Origin: Palmerston North, Manawatū-Whanganui, New Zealand
- Genres: Indie folk, pop
- Occupations: Singer, songwriter, guitarist
- Instrument: Guitar
- Years active: 2009–present
- Label: Sony Music New Zealand
- Formerly of: The Nerines
- Website: facebook.com/bennytipene

Benjamin Tipene (born 1990) is a New Zealand singer-songwriter and musician. He is known for his appearance on the first New Zealand series of The X Factor where he was the last contestant eliminated Competing in the Boys category, he was mentored by Ruby Frost. His debut single "Walking on Water" was released on 29 July 2013 and debuted at number two on the Official New Zealand Music Chart and was certified platinum.

== Early life ==
Tipene was born in 1990 in Auckland. In 2007 he and classmates at Freyberg High School formed a band which became indie rock group The Nerines and went on to be a popular act on Palmerston North's live music scene. Taking part in the SmokefreeRockquest competition, the band won a Future Recording Artist award. After switching from electric to acoustic guitar while travelling in Europe, Tipene returned to New Zealand and began performing acoustic songs and embarked on a tour of flats in Palmerston North. Tipene also recorded demos and albums that were released on Bandcamp. At the time of his The X Factor audition in early 2013, Tipene lived off music, working one day a week at a Palmerston North musical instrument retailer and playing professional gigs on weekends.

== The X Factor ==
Tipene initially attended the Palmerston North pre-audition on 21 January 2013, where he was put through to the judges' auditions. At his judges' audition, Tipene performed a sung version of Outkast's "Hey Ya!" accompanied with acoustic guitar, eventually progressing to the top 13 in the live shows.

In week six, after a performance of "Can't Take My Eyes Off You" Tipene was in the bottom two with Tom Batchelor. With mentor Ruby Frost declining to vote against either of her acts, Batchelor was sent home from a majority vote from judges Stan Walker and Daniel Bedingfield, saving Tipene. In week nine, Tipene performed his own song "Boxes", the first New Zealand The X Factor contestant to perform an original song outside of auditions or a sing-off. During the final shows on 21 and 22 July, Tipene performed the Bat For Lashes song "Laura" and duetted with Dave Baxter of Avalanche City on the song "Love Love Love", then performed his audition song "Hey Ya!". Tipene was the last contestant eliminated from the audience vote.

== After The X Factor ==
After The X Factor, Tipene was signed to Sony Music New Zealand. His debut single "Walking on Water" was released in July 2013. It debuted at No.2 in the Official New Zealand Music Chart and was certified platinum in December 2013. Tipene was featured on the cover of the August/September issue of New Zealand music magazine Rip It Up.

Tipene's second single, "Make You Mine", was released in December, and was also used in Coca-Cola's "Coke loves summer" New Zealand ad campaign. In February 2014, Tipene's debut EP Toulouse was released. The EP contained six tracks, including the earlier single "Make You Mine" and new single "Lonely".

In May, "Make You Mine" was used in a promo for the fourth season of the popular Australian Seven Network television series Winners & Losers. In June Toulouse was released in Australia, with "Make You Mine" debuting in the ARIA Charts.

Tipene's debut album Bricks was released in October and included the singles "Step On Up" and "Good Man". Tipene's EP "Toulouse" was nominated for Best Pop Album at the 2014 New Zealand Music Awards, with Tipene also performing at the awards ceremony in November.

In 2015, Tipene returned to The X Factor to assist judge Natalia Kills with the Boys category at judges' retreats. Tipene's sixth single "Lanterns" is due to be released in May.

Tipene occasionally plays live music at bars in Palmerston North. During 2022 he played several shows at Gravity Bar in the former Grand Hotel.

Tipene played a show at the Ocean Beach Eatery in Foxton Beach in June 2023.

== Live shows ==
In the summer of 2013/2014, Tipene performed at a number of events and festivals, including Christmas in the Park events in Auckland and Christchurch, the Rhythm & Vines music festival, the Coke Loves Summer festivals at Mt Maunganui and Whangamata, the Parachute music festival, and the Homegrown music festival.

In July 2014, Tipene toured with Anika Moa on the So Good They Named It Twice tour of North Island towns with double names.

In the summer of 2014/2015, Tipene was a headline act at Christmas in the Park in Tauranga and performed at Christmas in the Vines in Auckland. Tipene also performed at the Homegrown music festival in 2015.

In early 2017, he toured New Zealand with Brooke Fraser and Bic Runga in The Winery Tour.

== Discography ==
- Toulouse EP (2014)
- Bricks (2014)

== Awards ==
Year	Nominee / work	Award	Result
2014	Benny Tipene - Toulouse	2014 New Zealand Music Awards - Best Pop Album	Nominated
