= Over the Moon (Ginny Blackmore album) =

Studio album by Ginny Blackmore
- Released: 4 December 2015
- Genre: Pop
- Label: Sony Music Entertainment New Zealand
- Producer: Aeon Manahan, Rob Wells

Singles from Over the Moon
- 1. "Bones" Released: 11 March 2013; 2. "Holding You" Released: 3 April 2014; 3. "Love Me Anyway" Released: 15 January 2015; 4. "Hello World" Released: 5 February 2015; 5. "Under My Feet" Released: 9 October 2015

Over the Moon is the debut studio album by New Zealand singer-songwriter Ginny Blackmore. It was released on 4 December 2015.

== Singles ==
Five singles from the album have been released so far:

- "Bones" (2013)
- "Holding You" (2014)
- "Love Me Anyway" (2015)
- "Hello World" (2015)
- "Under My Feet" (2015)

== Track listing ==
NZ edition
No.	Title	Writer(s)	Length
1.	"Over the Moon"	Ginny Blackmore; Aeon Manahan	3:51
2.	"Hello World"	Blackmore; Alan Kasirye	3:44
3.	"Bones"	Blackmore; Manahan	4:00
4.	"SFM"	Blackmore; Manahan	4:09
5.	"Under My Feet"	Al Shux; Blackmore	3:43
6.	"Kissing On You"	Blackmore; Manahan	3:42
7.	"Enough"	Blackmore; Johan Fransson; Tim Larsson; Tobias Lundgren; Manahan	3:22
8.	"Put Ya Name On It"	Blackmore; Tricky Stewart	5:45
9.	"Possession"	Blackmore; Shazelle Gobin; Mungal Patasar; Rob Wells	3:54
10.	"Holding You" (with Stan Walker)	Blackmore; Patrick Jordan; Manahan; Walker	3:40
11.	"Love Strikes"	Blackmore; Matthew Marston; Wells	3:40
12.	"Love Me Anyway"	Blackmore; Sam de Jong	3:34
13.	"Faithful"	Blackmore; Alan Nglish	3:27
14.	"Right Spot"	Blackmore; Manahan	4:52

Notes

- "SFM" was originally released by Christina Aguilera under the title "Sing for Me" on her album Lotus.
- "Love Strikes" was originally released by Katharine McPhee on her album Hysteria.

== Charts ==
Chart (2015)	Peak position
New Zealand Albums (RMNZ)	25
