= Richey McCourt =

Irish music producer and songwriter

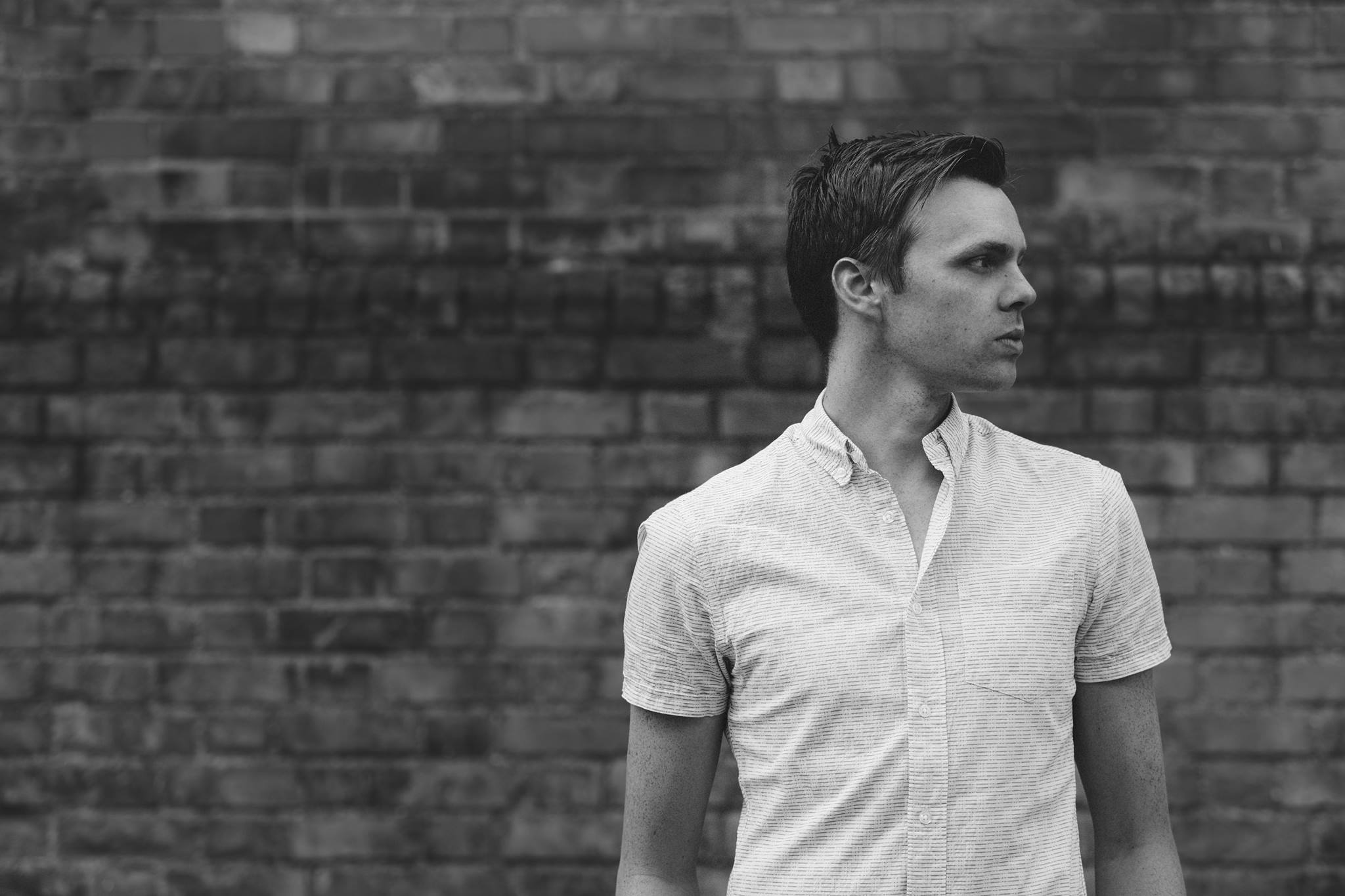
- McCourt in May 2015

Background information
- Born: Richey McCourt; 11 May 1981 (age 45); Dublin, Ireland
- Genres: Pop; electropop; dance-pop; pop rock
- Occupations: Songwriter; record producer; musician
- Instruments: Guitar; drums; bass; keyboards; vocals
- Years active: 2013–present

Richey McCourt (born 11 May 1981) is a Dublin-based songwriter, who is signed to Stockholm-based publishing company, DH MGMT. McCourt has worked with artists and producers including Will Young, Pixie Lott, Matt Cardle, Rebecca Ferguson and Isaac Waddington. He writes predominantly with Swedish-based writer and producer Nick Jarl. McCourt and Jarl's song "Losing the Love" is featured in the Disney movie Tini: The Movie starring Martina "Tini" Stoessel and on her debut album.

In June 2015, McCourt was interviewed as part of the IrishTimes.com series How Music Works, where he discussed his approach to songwriting, and his background in performance.

McCourt has co-written a song for the Rebecca Ferguson album Superwoman, called "I'll Meet You There". The album was released on 14 October 2016. In October 2017, a track written and produced by McCourt/Jarl "Not Alone" was released by Hollywood Records artist Shalisa.

== Songwriting discography ==
| Artist | Track | Year | Label |
|---|---|---|---|
| Will Young | "I Don't Need a Lover" | 2015 | Island UK |
| Tini | "Se escapa tu amor" / "Losing the Love" | 2016 | Hollywood Records |
| Rebecca Ferguson | "I'll Meet You There" | 2016 | Syco / RCA |
| Shalisa | "Not Alone" | 2017 | Hollywood Records |
| Erica-Cody | "Love Me Like I Do" | 2024 | |
