= Bricks (album) =

Studio album by Benny Tipene
- Released: 17 October 2014
- Genre: Pop
- Label: Sony Music Entertainment NZ
- Producer: Sam de Jong

Benny Tipene chronology
Toulouse (2014)	Bricks (2014)

Singles from Bricks
- 1. "Step On Up" Released: 29 August 2014; 2. "Good Man"; 3. "Lanterns" Released: 5 May 2015

Bricks is the debut studio album by New Zealand singer-songwriter Benny Tipene. It was released on 17 October 2014. It was produced by Sam de Jong at Parachute Studios. The album was re-released in June 2015, containing three new songs and acoustic versions of 'Step On Up' and 'Give This Up'.

== Track listing ==
Bricks – Standard edition
No.	Title	Writer(s)	Length
1.	"Step On Up"	Benny Tipene, Jaden Parkes	3:23
2.	"No Good For Me"	Tipene, Josh Fountain	3:33
3.	"Lonely"	Joel Chapman, Tipene, Nat Dunn, Ricky Kradolfer	3:54
4.	"Good Man"	Tipene, Parkes	2:53
5.	"Either Gone or Lost"	Tipene, Parkes	3:29
6.	"Hooked on Love"	Tipene, Sam de Jong	4:08
7.	"Open Ending"	Tipene	4:19
8.	"Give This Up"	Tipene	4:31
9.	"Not Coming Back"	Tipene, Parkes	3:35
10.	"Young"	Tipene	4:18

iTunes bonus track
No.	Title	Writer(s)	Length
11.	"Make You Mine"	Dave Baxter, Benny Tipene	3:00

Bricks – Extended Sessions (bonus tracks)
No.	Title	Writer(s)	Length
11.	"Make You Mine"	Dave Baxter, Benny Tipene	3:00
12.	"Step On Up (Acoustic)"	Tipene, Parkes	3:13
13.	"Give This Up (Acoustic)"	Tipene	4:21
14.	"Lanterns"	Tipene, Alex Hope	2:50
15.	"Monday"	Tipene	4:19
16.	"Matters To Me"	Tipene	4:14

== Charts ==
Chart (2014)	Peak position
New Zealand Albums Chart	4

== Credits ==
- Guitars, Bass & Vocal - Benny Tipene
- Drums and Programming - Sam de Jong
- Production and Engineering - Sam de Jong
- A&R - Jaden Parkes
- A&R Administration - Lizzie McGowan
- Design - Harrison Burt & Jaden Parkes
- Photography - C. Alex de Freitas
- 'No Good For Me' Original Arrangement - Josh Fountain
- Recorded at Parachute Studios
- Mixed by Nic Manders at Wairaki Rd
- Mastered by Leon Zervos at Studio 301
