= Clap Clap Riot =

New Zealand indie rock band

Clap Clap Riot is a five-piece indie rock band based in Auckland, New Zealand.

== History ==
The band originated in Canterbury and was originally named Band Theft Auto.

== Discography ==
=== Albums ===
List of albums, with selected chart positions and certifications
Title	Album details	Peak chart positions
Title	Album details	NZ
Counting Spins	Released: 15 June 2012; Label: Universal Records	11
Nobody / Everybody	Released: 14 February 2014; Label: Universal Records	–
Dull Life	Released: 28 April 2017; Label: Universal Records	
TBC	Coming 2022	–
"—" denotes a recording that did not chart or was not released in that territory.

=== EPs ===
List of albums, with selected chart positions
Title	Album details	Peak chart positions
Title	Album details	NZ
TV Knows Better	Released: 2008	—
Yoko Ono	Released: 2012	—
"—" denotes a recording that did not chart or was not released in that territory.

=== Singles ===
List of singles, with selected chart positions
Title	Year	Peak chart positions	Album
Title	Year	NZ	Album
"Don't Want Your Baby"	2008	—	TV Knows Better
"Thief"	2008	—	TV Knows Better
"Everyone's Asleep"	2011	—	Counting Spins
"Yoko Ono"	2011	—	Counting Spins
"Moss-Haired Girl"	2011	—	Counting Spins
"So You Say"	2012	—	Counting Spins
"Lie"	2012	—	Counting Spins
"Everybody"	2013	—	Nobody / Everybody
"Sweet Patricia"	2013	—	Nobody / Everybody
"All About The Weather"	2013	—	Nobody / Everybody
"Back into Your Life"	2014	—	Single
"Help Me"	2016	—	Dull Life
"Tired of Getting Old"	2017	—	Dull Life
"Crickets in the Grass"	2017	—	Dull Life
"It's Alright"	2021	—	Single
"—" denotes a recording that did not chart or was not released in that territory.

== Members ==
- Stephen Heard – Vocals and Guitar
- Dave Rowlands – Guitar
- Tristan Colenso – Bass guitar
- Alex Freer – Drums
- Anthony Metcalf – Keyboards and Guitar

== Past members ==
- Sam Mountain – Drums – 2006 to 2010
- Strachan Rivers – Drums – 2010 to 2012
- Jonathan Pearce – Guitar / Keyboards
- Mark Perkins – Guitar / Keys
