= Ralphie Aversa =

American entertainment host and reporter

- Born: Ralph Frank Aversa II; June 6, 1985 (age 41); Lewiston, NY, U.S.
- Occupations: television and radio personality
- Years active: 2003–present
- Website: www.ralphieaversa.com

Ralphie Aversa is an American syndicated radio host and entertainment reporter. His forte is interviews – from topic experts to national newsmakers. Ralphie has spoken with everyone from Lady Gaga, to Matt Damon. He has covered a wide variety of events on location, from the 2008 Presidential Election to the MTV Video Music Awards.

“The Ralphie Radio Show” aired on Cumulus Media's 95.5 WPLJ in New York City (the show's flagship station), 92 PRO-FM in Providence, RI, Q105 in Groton, CT and 97 BHT in Scranton/Wilkes-Barre, PA. Aversa offers exclusive interviews, hit music, soon-to-be hit music, and commentary on the stories of the day. His total audience between the four stations stands at over 700,000 people.

“The Ralphie Report” lives in both print and TV forms. The former began running in Northeastern Pennsylvania’s The Weekender (Circulation: 170,000) back in 2008. The column is a weekly, print version of “The Ralphie Radio Show’s” best content.

The TV version aires every Thursday at 4 pm on WBRE-TV's “PA Live!” Aversa runs down three of the most recognizable stories from the week with his take on each for the NBC affiliate.

The digital presence for the show is maintained on both participating station websites and ralphieaversa.com. These platforms feature music, video content, and audio podcasts of show segments. Additionally, Aversa maintains an active presence on social media platforms including Facebook and Twitter.

In addition to his own platforms, Aversa has contributed on a national level to FOX News, CNN, HLN, MSNBC, TMZ, Life & Style Weekly, and MTV News.

Aversa attended Syracuse University; dual-majoring in broadcast journalism and marketing. He is originally from Niagara Falls, NY.
