= Falling into Place (David Dallas album) =

Studio album by David Dallas
- Released: October 18, 2013
- Recorded: 2012–2013
- Genre: Hip hop
- Length: 45:03
- Label: Dirty; Duck Down; Dawn Raid
- Producer: David Dallas (exec.); Fire & Ice (exec.); 41

David Dallas chronology
The Rose Tint (2011)	Falling into Place (2013)	Hood Country Club (2017)

Singles from Falling into Place
- 1. "Runnin'" Released: 27 August 2013; 2. "The Wire" Released: 8 December 2013

Falling into Place is the third solo studio album by New Zealand rapper David Dallas, released through Dawn Raid Entertainment, Dirty Records and Duck Down Music on 18 October, 2013.

Production was handled by Dallas' long time collaborators Fire & Ice and 41. It features guest appearances from US rapper Freddie Gibbs, alongside New Zealand artists Sid Diamond, Ruby Frost, PNC, Mareko, Spycc and Rokske.

The album debuted at number 2 on the New Zealand Albums Chart. It won 'Best Urban/Hip Hop Album' at the 2014 New Zealand Music Awards and was shortlisted for the 2014 Taite Music Prize.

== Singles ==
On August 7, 2013, "My Mentality", featuring Freddie Gibbs was released as the first promotional single.

The album's first single, "Runnin'" was released on August 27, 2013. It peaked at #7 on the New Zealand Singles Chart and was certified Platinum in New Zealand. "Runnin'" was used in the official release trailer for Madden NFL 25 and also featured in the official soundtrack for FIFA 14. The official remix featuring Jim Jones of the Diplomats was released on 20 December 2013. It also features in the 2022 Adam Sandler film Hustle.

The second official single, "The Wire", featuring Ruby Frost, was released on 8 December, 2013. It peaked at number 11 on the New Zealand Singles Chart and was certified Gold.

== Track listing ==
No.	Title	Producer	Length
1.	"The Wire" (feat. Ruby Frost)	Fire & Ice	3:43
2.	"Transmitting Live"	Fire & Ice	3:26
3.	"Runnin'"	Fire & Ice	3:46
4.	"Gotta Know" (feat. Rokske)	Fire & Ice	2:44
5.	"How Long" (feat. PNC & Spycc)	41	5:11
6.	"My Mentality" (feat. Freddie Gibbs)	Fire & Ice	4:13
7.	"Local Celeb"	Fire & Ice	3:53
8.	"Southside" (feat. Sid Diamond & Mareko)	Fire & Ice	3:45
9.	"Follow"	Fire & Ice	3:17
10.	"Right There"	Fire & Ice	3:35
11.	"One More"	41	3:52
12.	"The Gate" (feat. Ruby Frost)	Fire & Ice	3:38

== Charts ==
Chart (2013)	Peak position
New Zealand Albums (RMNZ)	2

== Release history ==
Region	Date	Format	Label
New Zealand	18 October 2013	CD; digital download	Dirty Records; Duck Down Music; Dawn Raid Entertainment
United States	23 October 2013	CD; digital download	Dirty Records; Duck Down Music; Dawn Raid Entertainment
Various	25 October 2013	CD; digital download	Dirty Records; Duck Down Music; Dawn Raid Entertainment
