= Christmas in the Park (New Zealand) =

Music festivals in New Zealand

Coca-Cola Christmas in the Park
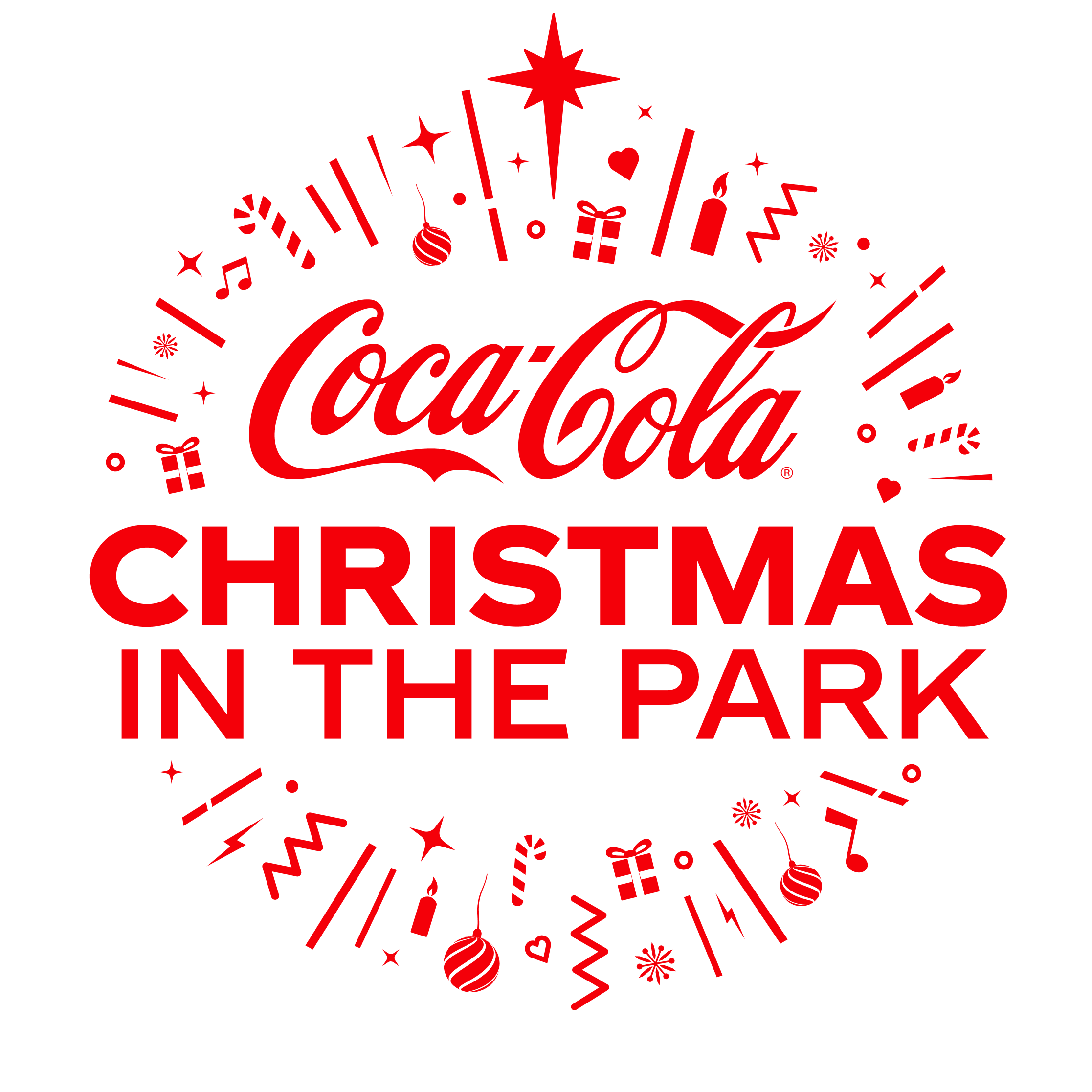
- Christmas in the Park is sponsored by Coca-Cola for the Auckland and Christchurch events.
- Date: December 12, 2026 (Auckland) November 28, 2026 (Christchurch)
- Venue: Auckland Domain, North Hagley Park
- Location: Auckland, Christchurch
- Type: Free music concert
- Theme: Christmas
- Website: www.christmasinthepark.co.nz

Christmas in the Park is the title given to annual free music concerts held in cities across New Zealand during the Christmas season. The two largest Christmas in the Park events, held in Auckland and Christchurch since December 10, 1994, are sponsored by Coca-Cola. They draw up to 250,000 and 100,000 spectators, respectively. Coca-Cola refers to its Auckland Christmas in the Park production as the largest free annual event in New Zealand. A combined total of six million New Zealanders have attended the Auckland and Christchurch events since their founding. Activities include music, fireworks displays, and the lighting of Christmas trees. Each concert draws an estimated $100,000 for charity annually.

The Auckland and Christchurch Christmas in the Park events are partnered with Christchurch City Council, Auckland City Council Events, Mainfreight, More FM, The Breeze, The Lion Foundation, Trillian Trust, and Rockshop NZ.
