= The Wire (David Dallas song) =

- Cover art for the remix by P-Money

Single by David Dallas featuring Ruby Frost

from the album Falling Into Place
- Released: 8 December 2013
- Genre: Hip hop; trip hop; synthpop
- Length: 3:43
- Label: Dawn Raid; Dirty; Duck Down
- Songwriters: David Dallas, J Iusitini, A Iusitini, J de Jong
- Producers: Fire & Ice

David Dallas singles chronology
"Runnin'" (2013)	"The Wire" (2013)	"Fit In" (2017)

"The Wire" is the second official single from Dallas' third studio album, Falling Into Place, featuring Ruby Frost, released on 8 December 2013.

== Background and release ==
Frost sent Dallas a demo of her singing "The Wire" backed by a programmed piano. The track was refined by producers Fire & Ice "into something that would fit with the album."

A trip hop remix by P-Money was released on 7 February 2014.

== Reception ==
"The Wire" debuted at #26 on the New Zealand Singles Chart on 23, December 2013. It reached its peak position of #11 on 20 January 2014. On 10 February 2014, it was certified Gold by Recorded Music NZ.

== Charts ==
Chart (2013)	Peak position
New Zealand (Recorded Music NZ)	11

== Certifications ==
Region	Certification	Certified units/sales
New Zealand (RMNZ)	Gold	7,500^{*}
^{*} Sales figures based on certification alone.
