= Mark Sudack =

American record producer (born 1978)

Mark Andrew Sudack (born April 9, 1978 in New York City, New York, United States) is an American record producer, talent manager and concert promoter.

== Career ==
Sudack is most known for his management clients which have included pop stars Mariah Carey and Avicii, as well as television personality Michael Strahan. Sudack is also currently an operating partner in III Points Music Festival, and COO of the marketing and branding agency Creative Contender.

== Personal life ==
Sudack reportedly dated Mariah Carey from 2004 until 2008. Sudack married Laura Katzenberg, daughter of the DreamWorks CEO Jeffrey Katzenberg, in September 2012.
