= Runnin' (David Dallas song) =

Single by David Dallas

from the album Falling into Place
- Released: 27 August 2013
- Genre: Hip hop, blues
- Length: 3:46
- Label: Dawn Raid Entertainment; Dirty Records; Duck Down Music Inc.
- Songwriter(s): Dallas; Iustini; Britt; Motzer; Mo
- Producer(s): Fire & Ice

David Dallas singles chronology
"My Mentality" (2013)	"Runnin'" (2013)	"The Wire" (2013)

"Runnin'" is a 2013 single from New Zealand rapper David Dallas, released as the first official single from his third studio album Falling into Place.

It was released on 27 August 2013, peaking at #7 on the New Zealand Singles Chart and was certified Platinum by Recorded Music NZ.

The official remix featuring Jim Jones of the Diplomats was released on 20 December 2013.

It features in the official release trailer for Madden NFL 25, the soundtrack for FIFA 14, and also the critically acclaimed, Adam Sandler starring film Hustle.

== Composition ==
"Runnin'" is a blues-influenced hip hop song.

== Music video ==
A music video for the song was released on 22 September 2013. It was directed by Tom Gould and filmed in and around Mitimiti, a small settlement in the Hokianga. Much of the video was shot in the nearby historic St Gabriel's Church in Pawarenga. The video also features wild horses of the region.

== Charts ==
Chart (2013)	Peak position
New Zealand (Recorded Music NZ)	7

== Certifications ==
Region	Certification	Certified units/sales
New Zealand (RMNZ)	Platinum	15,000^{*}
^{*} Sales figures based on certification alone.
