= Toulouse (EP) =

EP by Benny Tipene
- Released: 28 February 2014
- Recorded: Parachute Studios, Auckland, 2013
- Genre: Pop, folk pop
- Length: 24:51
- Label: Sony Music Entertainment NZ
- Producer: Sam de Jong

Benny Tipene chronology
Toulouse (2014)	Bricks (2014)

Singles from Toulouse
- 1. "Make You Mine" Released: 6 December 2013; 2. "Lonely" Released: 4 April 2014

Toulouse is the debut EP released by New Zealand singer-songwriter Benny Tipene in 2014. It was produced by Sam de Jong and released by Sony Music Entertainment New Zealand. Tipene's debut single "Walking on Water" is included on digital copies as a bonus track.

== Critical reception ==
Calling it a "little love letter of an EP," Kate Taylor of muzic.net.nz said the EP "smacks of the delay being due to his perfectionism and care to produce a solid, lasting debut effort."

== Track listing ==
No.	Title	Writer(s)	Length
1.	"Make You Mine"	Dave Baxter, Benny Tipene	3:00
2.	"Lonely"	Joel Chapman, Benny Tipene, Nat Dunn, Ricky Kradolfer	3:54
3.	"Embrace"	Benny Tipene	3:23
4.	"Toulouse"	Benny Tipene	3:53
5.	"Fight For You"	Jaden Parkes, Josh Fountain, Benny Tipene	4:31
6.	"Better Side"	Jaden Parkes, Benny Tipene, Ryan Taubert, Tiaan Williams	3:16

iTunes bonus track
No.	Title	Writer(s)	Length
7.	"Walking on Water"	Anthony Egizii, David Musumeci, Jonathan Green	2:57

== Personnel ==
- Benny Tipene - guitars, vocals, bass
- Sam de Jong - drums, keys, programming, bass
- Holly Pearson, Luke Oram, Laura Hunter - backing vocals on "Make You Mine"
- Produced and Engineered by Sam de Jong
- Recorded at Parachute Studios
- Mixed by Nic Manders at Wairiki Rd
- Mastered by Leon Zervos at Studios 301, Sydney
- "Make You Mine" mastered by Chris Chetland at Kog Mastering Ltd, Auckland
- Cover artwork by Hikalu Clarke

== Charts ==
Chart (2014)	Peak position
New Zealand Albums Chart	4
