= Ginny Blackmore =

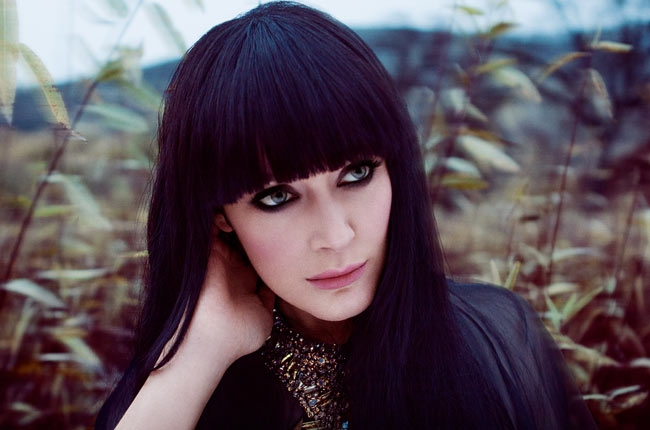
- Bones Single Artwork

Background information
- Born: Virginia Blackmore; 6 March 1986 (age 40); Auckland, New Zealand
- Genres: Pop, rock, R&B
- Occupations: Singer, songwriter
- Years active: 2010–present
- Label: Epic Records

Virginia Blackmore (born 6 March 1986) is a singer and songwriter from Auckland, New Zealand. Blackmore's song, Bones, has received regular airplay throughout the United States and she has also performed the song on Weekend Mixtape and the Ralphie Show on 95.5 WPLJ. The song also entered the Billboard Music Charts at No. 40 for Adult Pop Songs in March 2013, reached No. 1 on the Official New Zealand Music Chart in July 2013 and certified platinum in the first week of August 2013.

== Career ==
Blackmore left school at the age of 16 to become a musician. It was her principal who encouraged her to leave school and focus on her career which was also said to be supported by her parents. She began her career in London where she secured a publishing deal as a songwriter. She has previously written songs for artists such as Christina Aguilera and Adam Lambert but decided that she wanted to sing the songs herself. She then wrote and performed the songs SFM and Bones. She was said to have impressed music manager Mark Sudack and later signed with Epic Records. Blackmore performed "Bones" on Live with Kelly and Michael in June 2013. She opened for OneRepublic's concerts in Auckland and Wellington in November 2013.

Blackmore is currently signed by Epic Records and appeared at a showcase with L.A. Reid in Los Angeles, California held in her honour. In March 2015, Blackmore made an appearance on the second season of the New Zealand version of The X Factor, serving as a guest mentor for Stan Walker's category (Girls), and performing her song "Love Me Anyway" on the second live results show.

== Discography ==
=== Albums ===
List of albums, with selected chart positions
Title	Album details	Peak chart positions
Title	Album details	NZ
Over the Moon	Release date: 4 December 2015; Label: Sony Music Entertainment; Format: CD, Digital download	25

=== Singles ===
Year	Title	Peak chart positions	
Year	Title	NZ	US Adult
2013	"Bones"	1	30
2013	"SFM"	21	—
2014	"Holding You" (with Stan Walker)	1	—
2015	"Love Me Anyway"	31	—
2015	"Hello World"	—	—
2015	"Under My Feet"	—	—
"—" denotes a recording that did not chart in that country.

== See also ==
- List of Epic Records artists
