= Ruby Frost =

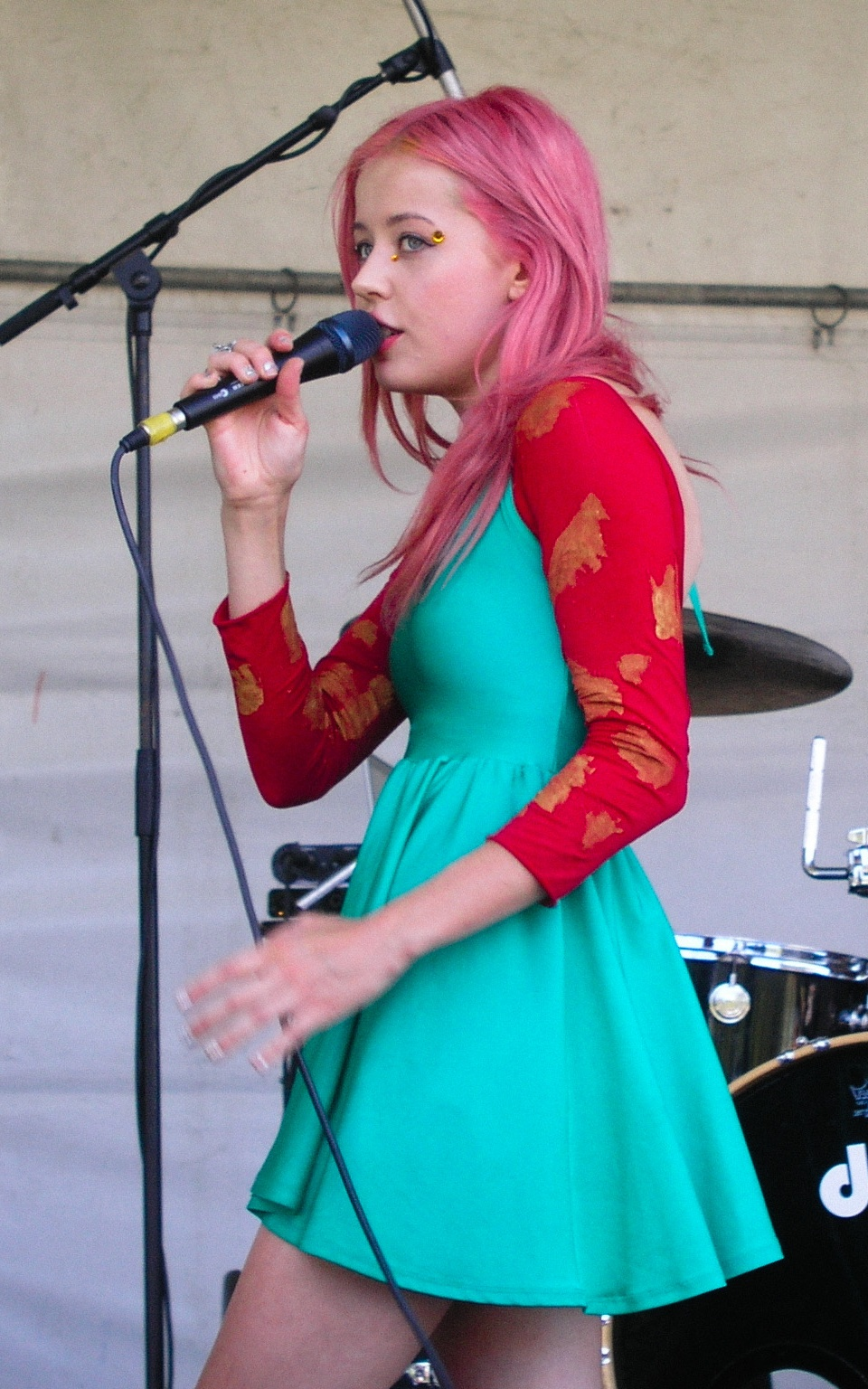

Background information
- Born: Jane de Jong; 1987 (age 38–39); Wellington, New Zealand
- Origin: Auckland, New Zealand
- Genres: Indie pop; electronic
- Occupation: Singer-songwriter
- Years active: 2008–present
- Label: Universal Music
- Website: Official site

Jane de Jong (born 1987), known professionally as Ruby Frost, is a New Zealand singer and songwriter from Auckland. In 2009, she won the nationwide music competition MTV 42Unheard, giving her a recording contract with Universal Music New Zealand. Since then she has performed showcases at CMJ in New York and The Viper Room in LA; toured with Mt Eden, Cut Copy, Evermore and Van She; and opened for acts including Diplo, Nero, Kimbra, Digitalism and Garbage. She was one of the four judges in season one of The X Factor NZ, and was the runner-up mentor when her act Whenua Patuwai came second in the competition.

== Early singles ==
In December 2011, Ruby Frost released her debut single "Moonlight" on bFM, which went to #1 and stayed in the radio station's top 10 for 10 consecutive weeks. The accompanying video was directed by Veronica Crockford-Pound.

Ruby Frost's song "O That I Had" (off her debut, self-released EP) was remixed by Mt Eden in 2010, receiving over one million views on YouTube.

== Songwriting competitions ==
In 2010, Ruby won the Grand Prize of the Pop category in the international John Lennon Songwriting Contest: Section I. This was for her demo "Hazy".

Ruby also came in third place in the Pop/Top 40 category of the International Songwriting Competition (2011), for "Hazy".

In 2012, Ruby's song "Water to Ice" was shortlisted in the Top 20 for the NZ APRA Silver Scrolls.

== 2012 releases ==
=== Debut album ===
Frost's debut album Volition was produced in New York by Chris Zane and was released in New Zealand on 8 June 2012 by Universal Music New Zealand. Physical copies of the album came complete with abstract short stories written by Ruby.

The album was critically well received.

=== Singles ===
Ruby released "Water to Ice" in New Zealand in April 2012. The single was playlisted by New Zealand mainstream radio stations The Edge and ZM, and peaked at #3 in The Official New Zealand Music Chart's NZ Singles category. The single's video clip was directed by Joel Kefali and Campbell Smith of Special Problems, and was featured on the frontpage of Vimeo as a Staff Pick on 8 August.

Her next single "Young" was released in New Zealand in September 2012, with a video clip made by Sam Kristofski. Home Brew Crew remixed the song, and it charted in The Edge's Fat 40 for two months, sparking off a national house party tour that the radio station sponsored (along with Vodafone and Glassons).

Ruby was also featured on the Flight of the Conchords single "Feel Inside", which was released to raise money for the children's charity Cure Kids.

In 2013, Ruby co-wrote 'The Wire', the second single on David Dallas's album "Falling into Place". She also sang guest vocals on his song 'The Gate'.

In 2014, she released her first single from her time in Stockholm - "Comeback Queen".

In May 2018, the Manawatū Standard reported that Frost is still working on a second studio album.

== Discography ==
=== Albums ===
Year	Title	Details	Music Charts
Year	Title	Details	NZ
2012	Volition	Released: 25 June 2012; Label: Universal Music NZ; Producer: Chris Zane	4

=== Singles ===
Year	Title	NZ Charts		Album
Year	Title	NZ Singles	Top 40	Album
2010	"Moonlight"	—	—	Volition
2011	"Odyssey"	—	—	Volition
2012	"Water to Ice"	3	—	Volition
2012	"Young"	6	—	Volition
2012	"Feel Inside (And Stuff Like That)" Flight of the Conchords charity single	1	1	Non-album single
2013	"The Wire" (David Dallas featuring Ruby Frost)	2	11	Falling Into Place
2014	"Comeback Queen"	—	—	Non-album singles
2021	"Never Be Your Baby"	—	—	Non-album singles
