= City Riots =

Australian indie rock band

- Origin: Adelaide, South Australia, Australia
- Genres: Indie rock
- Years active: 2005–2016?
- Labels: MGM; Inertia
- Members: Ricky Kradolfer; Matt Edge; Matt Stadler; Dan Kradolfer
- Past members: John de Michele

City Riots were an indie rock band from Adelaide, which formed in 2005 and active until about 2014. Their lead vocalist and front man was Ricky Kradolfer. They played in Australia, United States and the United Kingdom, touring with Smashing Pumpkins, Cobra Starship, Midnight Juggernauts and others

== History ==
The band formed in 2005. Their 2008 single "Burning Me Out" received national airplay on Triple J, were one of the station's Next Crop Acts and were an Unearthed J Award nominee in 2008.

They played in Australia, United States and the United Kingdom, touring with Smashing Pumpkins, The Academy Is..., Cobra Starship, Midnight Juggernauts and Operator Please.

In 2010 the band performed at South by Southwest, and the track "She Never Wants to Dance" later appeared on the band's debut album, Sea of Bright Lights, in 2012, and received high rotation on Triple J. The associated tour started with a gig supporting the Living End in November 2012.

In 2013, Ricky Kradolfer won the Best Music Manager award in the Fowlers Live Awards (now South Australian Music Awards).

The last post on their Facebook page dates from February 2016, and by November 2016 the group had disbanded, with Ricky Kradolfer appearing with Sydney-based High Violet.

== Reviews ==
Tess Ingram of The Music reviewed Sea of Bright Lights (22 October 2012) and observed, "With breathy vocals, soaring synths, jangly guitars and hook-laden pop tunes, [this release] is the perfect album for a summer road trip or a long day at the beach. The aforementioned sonic combination could come across as fake and irritating, but [the group] have found the perfect balance of indie rock and dream pop to make this a debut with enough variation to be an easy listen."

== Members ==
- Daniel Kradolfer: – drums, percussion, backing vocals
- Ricky Kradolfer: – vocals, guitars, synthesiser, organ
- Mark Seddon: – bass guitar
- John de Michele: – bass guitar, percussion, backing vocals
- Matt Stadler: – keyboards, synthesiser
- Matthew Edge: – bass guitar, vocals, guitars, keyboards

== Discography ==
=== Albums ===
List of albums, with selected details
| Title | Details |
|---|---|
| Sea of Bright Lights | Released: 22 October 2012; Label: Inertia Music (CITRIOT12); Format: CD, digital |

=== Extended plays ===
List of EPs, with selected details
| Title | Details |
|---|---|
| City Riots | Released: 6 November 2006; Label: City Riots (CITYRIOT06); Format: CD |
| Socialize | Released: 2008; Format: CD |
| Matchsticks | Released: 2011; Format: CD |

== Awards and nominations ==
=== Fowler's Live Music Awards ===
The Fowler's Live Music Awards took place from 2012 to 2014 to "recognise success and achievement over the past 12 months [and] celebrate the great diversity of original live music" in South Australia. Since 2015 they're known as the South Australian Music Awards.

| Year | Nominee / work | Award | Result (wins only) |
|---|---|---|---|
| 2013 | Ricky Kradolfer (City Riots) | Best Music Manager | Won |

=== J Awards ===
The J Awards are an annual series of Australian music awards that were established by the Australian Broadcasting Corporation's youth-focused radio station Triple J. They commenced in 2005.

| Year | Nominee / work | Award | Result |
|---|---|---|---|
| J Awards of 2008 | themselves | Unearthed Artist of the Year | Nominated |
