= Holding You =

2014 single by New ZealandGinny Blackmore and Australian–New ZealandStan Walker

Single by Ginny Blackmore and Stan Walker

from the album Over the Moon
- B-side: "I Can't Make You Love Me"
- Released: 4 April 2014
- Length: 3:39
- Label: Sony
- Songwriters: Ginny Blackmore; Stan Walker

Ginny Blackmore singles chronology
"SFM" (2013)	"Holding You" (2014)	"Love Me Anyway" (2015)

Stan Walker singles chronology
"Like It's Over" (2013)	"Holding You" (2014)	"Aotearoa" (2014)

"Holding You" is a song by New Zealand singer-songwriter Ginny Blackmore and Australian–New Zealand recording artist Stan Walker. It was released as a single by Sony Music Entertainment on 4 April 2014.

== Background and release ==
"Holding You" was written by Blackmore and Walker. According to Walker, he wrote the second verse about his girlfriend, and called the song "a real hearty story about love and how grateful and lucky we are to have that person in our life." "Holding You" was released as a digital download by Sony Music Entertainment on 4 April 2014. A three-track download was released on 18 April 2014. In Australia, "Holding You" was released as a 5-track download and compact disc single on 13 June 2014.

== Reception ==
"Holding You" debuted atop the New Zealand Singles Chart of 14 April 2014, becoming the second number-one single on the chart for both Blackmore and Walker. In its fifth week on the chart, the single was certified gold by Recorded Music NZ for selling 7,500 copies, and was certified platinum in September 2014. It entered the Australian Singles Chart at number forty-three on 29 June 2014.

== Music video ==
The music video for "Holding You" was directed by Jessica Sanderson, and premiered on Stuff.co.nz on 10 April 2014. Sanderson created the video around the Māori mythology creation story of Rangi and Papa; in the video, Walker represents the Earth while Blackmore represents the sky.

== Live performances ==
Blackmore and Walker performed "Holding You" in Queenstown, New Zealand on 19 June 2014. The performance was broadcast live on Australian breakfast television show Sunrise, as part of its first live New Zealand broadcast which coincided with the fortieth anniversary of the Queenstown Winter Festival.

== Formats and track listings ==
- NZ digital download
1. "Holding You" – 3:39
- NZ maxi download
1. "Holding You" – 3:39
2. "Holding You" (acoustic version) – 3:52
3. "I Can't Make You Love Me" – 3:57
- Australian download and CD single
1. "Holding You" – 3:39
2. "Holding You" (acoustic version) – 3:52
3. "I Can't Make You Love Me" – 3:57
4. "Black Box"
5. "Take It Easy" (alternate version)

== Charts ==
=== Weekly charts ===
Chart (2014)	Peak position
ARIA Singles Chart	43
New Zealand Singles Chart	1

=== Year-end charts ===
Chart (2014)	Position
New Zealand Top 50 Singles	35
New Zealand Artist Top 50 Singles	2

== Certifications ==
Certifications and sales for "Holding You"
Region	Certification	Certified units/sales
New Zealand (RMNZ)	Platinum	15,000^{*}
^{*} Sales figures based on certification alone.

== See also ==
- List of number-one singles from the 2010s (New Zealand)
