= Let the Music Play (Stan Walker album) =

Studio album by Stan Walker
- Released: 18 November 2011
- Genres: Dance-pop; R&B; pop
- Length: 55:15
- Label: Sony
- Producers: Louis Schoorl; Drew Pearson; Anthony Egizii; David Musumeci; Khaled; Richard Vission; Chico Bennett; Brad Ackley; Lindsay Rimes; Adam "Wyshmaster" Cherrington; Nicholas "RAS" Furlong; Braddon Williams; Static Revenger; Michael D'Arcy; Styalz Fuego; Carl Dimataga

Stan Walker chronology
From the Inside Out (2010)	Let the Music Play (2011)	Inventing Myself (2013)

Singles from Let the Music Play
- 1. "Loud" Released: 6 May 2011; 2. "Light It Up" Released: 16 September 2011; 3. "Music Won't Break Your Heart" Released: 23 March 2012

Let the Music Play is the third studio album by Australian-New Zealand recording artist Stan Walker, released through Sony Music Australia on 18 November 2011. Walker worked with several record producers on the album, including Richard Vission, Chico Bennett, Nicholas "RAS" Furlong and Static Revenger, among others. The album featured several guest vocalists, including Jessica Mauboy, Annabel Fay and Walker's mother April, who is featured in a remake of Eva Cassidy's version of "Songbird". Musically, the album features more up-tempo dance-pop and R&B genres than Walker's previous album, From the Inside Out (2010), which included deep and emotional tracks.

Two singles preceded the album's release including, lead single "Loud", which reached the top-ten on the singles charts of Australia and New Zealand. "Light It Up", featuring Static Revenger, was released as the album's second single. Let the Music Play debuted at number 18 on the Australian ARIA Albums Chart, becoming the lowest charting album of Walker's career to date. On the New Zealand Albums Chart, the album debuted at number 12.

== Background and recording ==
Walker described the album as "a declaration of a celebration", stating that it is far more upbeat, playful and fresh in comparison to the deeper tracks on his previous album From the Inside Out (2010). In an interview with Nathan Taylor from Western Weekender, Walker explained, "The last album was more serious and showed the deeper parts of me. This one still shows all the depths of me but also me as a 21-year-old – the young, crazy and fun side definitely comes out in Let the Music Play." The album was inspired by many sounds from around the world, including Indian Bollywood to UK bubble gum pop and Māori culture.

Let the Music Play was recorded over four weeks; Walker recorded much of the album in the United States. The album includes a duet with Walker's mother, April, in a remake of Eva Cassidy's version of "Songbird". Walker said that he had to find the right song to sing with his mother on one of his album's, and chose Cassidy's version of "Songbird" because it is one of their all-time favourite songs. Let the Music Play also includes a duet with fellow singer Jessica Mauboy on the track "Galaxy", which had originally appeared on a re-release of her second studio album Get 'Em Girls. Walker explained, "We had been waiting for the right song to come for a while, because we really had to choose the right song for this. And that song came about and we both really liked it and decided that was the one, and that we just had to do it. And it turned out really well."

In an interview with Leesa Smith from Southern Courier, Walker explained, "The album is quite pop and dance-y, but there are hints of old skool stuff, like the duet I did with my mum. There are songs about freedom, liberation, unity and music."

== Release and promotion ==
Let the Music Play was released by Sony Music Australia on 18 November 2011, as both digital download and CD formats. A CD release in New Zealand followed on 21 November 2011. To celebrate the album's release, Walker appeared at the Westfield Parramatta store in Sydney with dance troupe Justice Crew on 19 November 2011, to perform several of the album's songs and sign CDs. The following day, he appeared at the Highpoint Shopping Centre in Melbourne. During a promotional tour in New Zealand, Walker appeared at The Warehouse Sylvia Park in Auckland on 24 November 2011, to sign CD copies and perform a song from the album. On 29 November 2011, Walker and Jessica Mauboy made a guest appearance on the Australian breakfast television program, Sunrise, to perform "Galaxy".

=== Singles ===
"Loud" was released as the album's lead single on 6 May 2011. It peaked at number nine on the Australian ARIA Singles Chart and number eight on the New Zealand Singles Chart. "Loud" was certified platinum by the Australian Recording Industry Association (ARIA), for selling 70,000 copies. In New Zealand, it was certified gold by the Recording Industry Association of New Zealand (RIANZ), for selling 7,500 digital copies. "Light It Up", featuring Static Revenger, was released as the second single on 16 September 2011. It peaked at number 45 on the ARIA Singles Chart and number 23 on the New Zealand Singles Chart. "Music Won't Break Your Heart" was released as a Digital EP on 23 March 2012, as the third single from Let the Music Play.

== Commercial performance ==
Let the Music Play debuted at number 18 on the Australian ARIA Albums Chart on 28 November 2011 and spent two weeks in the top 50. It marks the first time in Walker's career that one of his albums has missed the top five. His debut studio album, Introducing Stan Walker (2009) debuted at number three, while his second studio album, From the Inside Out (2010) charted at number two. On the ARIA Urban Albums Chart, Let the Music Play debuted at number three. On the New Zealand Albums Chart, the album debuted at number 12, again becoming Walker's first album in the country to miss the top five.

== Track listing ==
No.	Title	Writer(s)	Producer(s)	Length
1.	"On Our Way"	Stan Walker; Louis Schoorl; Jackie Barnes	Louis Schoorl	3:56
2.	"Loud"	Drew Pearson; Stephen Wrabel; Jon Asher	Drew Pearson	3:24
3.	"Music Won't Break Your Heart"	Walker; Anthony Egizii; David Musumeci	Anthony Egizii; David Musumeci	3:19
4.	"Galaxy" (with Jessica Mauboy)	Richard Vission; Ferras Alqaisi; Brett McLaughlin; Dominique Calvillo; Chico Bennett; Brad Ackley	Richard Vission; Chico Bennett; Brad Ackley*; Braddon Williams; Anthony Egizii; David Musumeci	4:03
5.	"Song in My Head"	Walker; Lindsay Rimes; Brett Creswell	Lindsay Rimes	3:38
6.	"Who We Are"	Walker; Egizii; Musumeci	Anthony Egizii; David Musumeci	3:32
7.	"Forever I'm Yours"	Walker; Fady "Faydee" Fatrouni; Khaled Rohaim	Khaled	3:51
8.	"Shine"	Pearson; Wrabel; Asher	Drew Pearson	3:48
9.	"Invisible" (featuring Annabel Fay)	Walker; Rimes; Annabel Fay; Danielle Blakey	Lindsay Rimes	3:33
10.	"Won't Let You Down"	Walker; Nick Furlong	Adam "Wyshmaster" Cherrington; Furlong	3:41
11.	"Light It Up" (featuring Static Revenger)	Dennis White; John Locke; Charissa Saverio; Jon Asher	Static Revenger	3:30
12.	"Move Your Body"	Walker; Michael D'Arcy	Michael D'Arcy	3:20
13.	"Tear Down These Walls"	Walker; Kaelyn Behr; Barry Southgate	Styalz Fuego	3:41
14.	"Welcome Home"	Dave Dobbyn	Carl Dimataga	4:25
15.	"Songbird"	Christine McVie	Carl Dimataga	3:34
Total length:				55:15

(*) Denotes additional producer

Notes

- Track 4, "Galaxy", was originally featured on the deluxe edition of Jessica Mauboy's album, Get 'Em Girls.
- Track 14, "Welcome Home", is a cover of the 2005 single by Dave Dobbyn.
- Track 15, "Songbird", is a remake of Eva Cassidy's version of the song.

== Personnel ==
- Credits adapted from album booklet.

Performance credits

- Annabel Fay – featured vocals on "Invisible"
- Jessica Mauboy – vocals on "Galaxy"
- April Walker – guest vocals on "Songbird"
- Stan Walker – lead vocals, background vocals on "Galaxy"
- Zion – gospel choir on "Welcome Home"

Instruments

- Vic "Per Diem" Chaga – string arrangement
- Carl Dimataga – instruments, string arrangement
- Anthony Egizii – programming and keys
- Rod McCormack – guitar
- Lindsay Rimes – instruments and programming

Technical and production

- Brad Ackley – additional production
- Chico Bennett – production
- Adam "Wyshmaster" Cherrington – production
- Tom Coyne – mastering
- Michael D'Arcy – production
- Carl Dimataga – arrangement, production
- Anthony Egizii – production, vocal production
- Styalz Fuego – production
- Nicholas "RAS" Furlong – engineering, production, vocal production
- James Kang – assistant mixing
- Khaled – production
- David Musumeci – production, vocal production
- Damien Lewis – additional/assistant engineering
- Brian Paturalski – mixing
- Drew Pearson – production
- Static Revenger – production
- Lindsay Rimes – mixing, production
- Louis Schoorl – mixing, production
- Phil Tan – mixing
- Richard Vission – production
- Miles Walker – mixing
- Braddon Williams – production, engineering
- Leon Zervos – mastering
- Joe Zook – mixing
- Matt Johnson – photography

== Charts ==
=== Weekly charts ===
Chart (2011)	Peak position
ARIA Albums Chart	18
ARIA Urban Albums Chart	3
New Zealand Albums Chart	12

=== Year-end charts ===
Chart (2011)	Rank
Australian Artists Albums Chart	37

== Release history ==
Country	Date	Format(s)	Label
Australia	18 November 2011	CD, digital download	Sony Music Australia
New Zealand	18 November 2011	Digital download	Sony Music Australia
New Zealand	21 November 2011	CD	Sony Music Australia
