= Loud (Stan Walker song) =

Single by Stan Walker

from the album Let the Music Play
- Released: 6 May 2011
- Recorded: 2011
- Genre: Dance-pop
- Length: 3:25
- Label: Sony
- Songwriters: Drew Pearson; Stephen Wrabel; Jon Asher
- Producer: Drew Pearson

Stan Walker singles chronology
"Homesick" (2010)	"Loud" (2011)	"Light It Up" (2011)

"Loud" is a song performed by Australian-New Zealand recording artist Stan Walker. The song was released as a digital download on 6 May 2011 as the lead single from his third studio album, Let the Music Play.

== Background ==
"Loud" was written by Drew Pearson, Stephen Wrabel and Jon Asher, and was produced by Pearson. It was recorded in Los Angeles during sessions for the follow-up to his second studio album, From the Inside Out (2010). The song was sent to Australian contemporary hit radio on 2 May 2011. A week later, it became the most-added song to radio. "Loud" was released as a two-track digital download on 6 May 2011 in Australia and New Zealand. Its CD single was released in Australia on 3 June 2011. In an interview with Inner West Courier, Walker said "the meaning behind the song is so simple. It's a declaration of a celebration, another step forward and just having fun."

== Chart performance ==
"Loud" debuted at number thirty-eight on the ARIA Singles Chart on 16 May 2011, and peaked at number nine on 20 June 2011. It is Walker's second top-ten single in Australia following "Black Box" (2009), and has since been certified Platinum by the Australian Recording Industry Association (ARIA), for shipments of 70,000 units. On the New Zealand Singles Chart "Loud" entered at number thirty on 16 May 2011. It peaked at number eight on 11 July 2011, and became Walker's fourth top-ten hit in New Zealand. The Recording Industry Association of New Zealand (RIANZ), certified "Loud" Gold for shipping 7,500 copies.

== Music video ==
The music video for "Loud" was filmed in Los Angeles, California, and was premiered exclusively on The Hot Hits Live from LA website 9 May 2011. The video opens with shots of various people in apartments. As the first verse begins Walker is seen entering a party, where he begins to dance and greet others. A disc jockey is seen to adjust the music volume, which results in the ceilings of the apartments cracking and falling. The people inside the apartments hear the music and join in the party. Towards the end of the song Walker moves onto a balcony and sings to people below him. Throughout the video scenes of Walker singing the song in front of a background of bright red lights are intercut. A writer for The Hot Hits Live from LA called the "Loud" video "probably his hottest video yet".

== Promotion ==
In May 2011, "Loud" was played in the background of a television commercial promoting new television shows on the Seven Network. The commercial ran for a period of five weeks. On 10 June 2011, Walker performed "Loud" live on Sunrise.

== Track listing ==
1. "Loud" – 3:25
2. "Loud" (Static Revenger Mix) – 7:00

== Credits and personnel ==
Credits adapted from Let the Music Play liner notes.

- Jon Asher – songwriter
- Tom Coyne – mastering
- Anthony Egizii – vocal producer
- Damien Lewis – additional/assistant engineering
- David Musumeci – vocal producer
- Drew Pearson – songwriter, producer
- Phil Tan – mixer
- Stephen Wrabel – songwriter

== Charts ==
=== Weekly charts ===
Weekly chart performance for "Loud"
Chart (2011)	Peak position
Australia (ARIA)	9
New Zealand (Recorded Music NZ)	8

=== Year-end charts ===
Year-end chart performance for "Loud"
Chart (2011)	Rank
Australian Singles Chart	88
Australian Artists Singles Chart	7
New Zealand Artists Singles Chart	5

== Certifications ==
Certifications and sales for "Loud"
Region	Certification	Certified units/sales
Australia (ARIA)	Platinum	70,000^{^}
New Zealand (RMNZ)	Gold	7,500^{*}
^{*} Sales figures based on certification alone.^{^} Shipments figures based on certification alone.
