= Get 'Em Girls =

Studio album by Jessica Mauboy
- Released: 24 August 2010
- Recorded: 2009–2010; Los Angeles; New York City; Atlanta
- Genres: Pop; hip hop; R&B
- Length: 51:59
- Label: Sony
- Producers: Andreas Levander; Audius Mtawarira; Bobby Bass; Bangladesh; Brian Kennedy; Carlin; Chuck Harmony; Fredro; Harvey Mason, Jr.; Israel Cruz; Jremy; Jazze Pha; KG; Khaled; Braddon Williams; Leon Seenandan; Lil' Ronnie; Mansur Zafr; Tha Cornaboyz; Youngboyz

Jessica Mauboy chronology
| Been Waiting (2008) | Get 'Em Girls (2010) | The Sapphires: Original Motion Picture Soundtrack (2012) |

Alternative cover
- Deluxe version cover artwork

Singles from Get 'Em Girls
- 1. "Get 'Em Girls" Released: 15 June 2010; 2. "Saturday Night" Released: 29 June 2010; 3. "What Happened to Us" Released: 20 July 2010; 4. "Inescapable" Released: 9 December 2010; 5. "Galaxy" Released: 28 October 2011

Get 'Em Girls is the second studio album by Australian singer Jessica Mauboy, released on 24 August 2010 by Sony. Mauboy recorded the album in Los Angeles, New York City and Atlanta. She worked with various American songwriters and producers she had not worked with before, including Bangladesh, Harvey Mason Jr., Chuck Harmony, Brian Kennedy, and Alex James, among others. Musically, Get 'Em Girls contains up-tempo and ballad-oriented songs, which derive from the genres of pop, hip hop and R&B. The album features guest vocal appearances from Snoop Dogg, Ludacris, Jay Sean, and Iyaz.

The album debuted at number six on the ARIA Albums Chart. Get 'Em Girls received mixed reviews from most critics, who were ambivalent towards its production. The album was preceded by the release of its Snoop Dogg-assisted lead single "Get 'Em Girls", which peaked within the top-twenty of the ARIA Singles Chart. The second single "Saturday Night", featuring Ludacris, became a top-ten hit and was certified double platinum for selling 140,000 copies. "What Happened to Us", a duet with Jay Sean, and "Inescapable", were released as the album's third and fourth singles, respectively. Mauboy promoted the album through live televised performances and served as a support act for Chris Brown's Australian F.A.M.E. Tour. Get 'Em Girls was re-released as a deluxe edition on 12 August 2011 and featured five additional songs, including the fifth single "Galaxy" (a duet with Stan Walker). In 2016, the album was certified platinum by the Australian Recording Industry Association for shipments of 70,000 copies.

== Background and development ==
In January 2010, Mauboy revealed that she would soon be heading to Los Angeles and New York to record the follow-up to her debut studio album Been Waiting (2008). She said, "We're going to meet some up and coming producers who are around my age and they are really hitting it hard in LA... I think it's their sound which is really catching me at the moment". Mauboy later told Who magazine that she would be working on the album there in February and March. In an interview for The Daily Telegraph in June 2010, Mauboy explained that the album's concept would be "all about women and the power of women". Mauboy also revealed that during her time in Los Angeles, she worked with producers Harvey Mason, Jr. and Rodney Jerkins. She said, "I'd always wanted to go to the States and work with songwriters and producers who have worked with my idols... I've been able to go into the studio and have a strong point of view on what I want and what I want my album to sound like."

== Recording and production ==
Mauboy wrote and recorded most of the songs on Get 'Em Girls in several recording studios in Los Angeles, Atlanta and New York City in 2009–2010. Mauboy spent most of her time there by herself without her manager or any of her friends around her. The experience of being so isolated gave her many things, including "strength and courage", which made her fearless. Mauboy would occasionally find herself in studios at three o'clock in the morning. She would sometimes begin working at nine o'clock at night and wouldn't finish until the next morning. Mauboy recorded thirty songs for the album; fourteen of which were selected for the track list.

During the early stages of production, Mauboy had booked a studio session with producer Rodney Jerkins, which began at nine o'clock in the morning. During the first two hours of the session, they sat in silence, and Jerkins soon left. He later returned at one o'clock in the afternoon, still having not spoken to Mauboy, and he began to essay a rhythm track. They worked until midnight and Jerkins decided that a Jamaican dancehall tune was the best outcome. Mauboy described the finished song as "interesting" and said it was not chosen for recording. During many sessions, Mauboy would find herself in a studio where her male counterparts had the invariable entourage. She said, "they all had their little posses, with the smoke blowing, and it was just like that Notorious movie." At one studio session in Atlanta, Mauboy worked with producer Jazze Pha, who was asleep almost the entire time she was in the studio recording his song, "Handle It". An assistant handled the actual recording work.

Most of the songs on the album were mixed by Phil Tan at Soapbox Studios in Atlanta, while the title track was mixed by Fabian Marasciullo at Paramount Recording Studios in Hollywood, California. "Fight for You" and "Here for Me" were mixed Harvey Mason, Jr. Most of the songs were mastered by Tom Coyne at Sterling Sound in New York, while the title track was mastered by Dave Kutch at The Mastering Palace in New York.

== Release and promotion ==
The album's official cover and track listing was revealed on 1 October 2010. On 1 November 2010, four days before its scheduled release, the album premiered on several websites, including The Daily Telegraph and Take 40 Australia. The standard edition of Get 'Em Girls was released simultaneously with the limited CD edition. The standard edition included the iTunes bonus track "Not Me", while the limited edition included "Forget Your Name". Get 'Em Girls was re-released as an expanded double-disc deluxe edition on 12 August 2011. In addition to the original track listing, the deluxe edition included five additional songs and remixes of the album's title track, "Saturday Night", "What Happened to Us", and "Inescapable".

During the album's first two days of release, Mauboy toured shopping malls in Melbourne, Mackay and Sydney performing several of the album's songs and signing CDs. The album was also promoted by Mauboy through live televised performances of "Saturday Night" on The X Factor Australia on 8 November 2010 and Hey Hey It's Saturday on 27 November 2010. She performed several of the album's songs and answered presubmitted questions from fans during her YouTube Sessions program on 4 December 2010. Mauboy performed "Saturday Night" and "Scariest Part" on Today on 7 December 2010. Ahead of Oprah Winfrey's visit to Melbourne, Mauboy performed at Federation Square on 10 December 2010. In April 2011, she served as a support act for Chris Brown's Australian F.A.M.E. Tour.

=== Singles ===
"Get 'Em Girls", featuring American rapper Snoop Dogg, was released on 17 September 2010 as the album's lead single. The song received a mixed response from critics and peaked at number 19 on the ARIA Singles Chart. "Saturday Night", featuring American rapper Ludacris, was released as the second single on 27 October 2010. It peaked at number seven on the ARIA Singles Chart and certified double platinum by the Australian Recording Industry Association for selling 140,000 copies.

The third single "What Happened to Us", featuring English recording artist Jay Sean, was released on 11 March 2011 and peaked at number 14 on the ARIA Singles Chart. It was certified platinum for selling 70,000 copies. The re-release of "What Happened to Us" featured guest vocals from Stan Walker. The album's fourth overall single and first single from the deluxe edition, "Inescapable" was released on 15 July 2011. The song peaked at number four and was certified double platinum. "Galaxy", featuring Stan Walker, was released as the album's fifth single on 28 October 2011. The single peaked at number 13 and was certified platinum.

=== Galaxy Tour ===
Galaxy Tour
- Tour by Jessica Mauboy and Stan Walker
- Location: Australia
- Associated album: Get 'Em Girls
- Start date: 13 January 2012
- End date: 11 February 2012
- No. of shows: 10
Jessica Mauboy tour chronology
| F.A.M.E. Tour (supporting) (2011) | Galaxy Tour (2012) | To the End of the Earth Tour (2013–14) |
Stan Walker tour chronology
| New Zealand Summer Tour (2011) | Galaxy Tour (2012) | World Tour of New Zealand (2013) |

In November 2011, it was announced that Mauboy and Walker would embark on a month-long Australian tour to celebrate the release of their duet "Galaxy". The tour began on 13 January 2012 and ended on 11 February 2012.

| Date | City | Venue |
|---|---|---|
| 13 January 2012 | Revesby | Revesby Workers Club |
| 14 January 2012 | Penrith | Penrith Panthers Club |
| 20 January 2012 | Mount Pritchard | Mounties |
| 21 January 2012 | Canberra | Southern Cross Club |
| 27 January 2012 | Gold Coast | Twin Towns Services Club |
| 28 January 2012 | Sunshine Coast | Caloundra RSL |
| 3 February 2012 | Castle Hill | Castle Hill RSL |
| 4 February 2012 | Campbelltown | Campbelltown RSL |
| 10 February 2012 | Melbourne | The Palms at Crown Casino |
| 11 February 2012 | Melbourne | The Palms at Crown Casino |

Set list
1. "Inescapable"
2. "Running Back"
3. "Been Waiting"
4. "Scariest Part"
5. "Let Me Be Me"
6. "Burn"
7. "Time After Time"
8. "Can Anybody Tell Me"
9. "Reconnected"
10. "No One Like You"
11. "Handle It"
12. "Get 'Em Girls"
13. "Up/Down"
14. "Maze"
15. "Saturday Night"
16. "What Happened to Us"
17. "Galaxy"

== Reception ==
Professional ratings
Review scores
| Source | Rating |
|---|---|
| AllMusic | 3.5/5 stars |

Get 'Em Girls received mixed reviews from critics. Jacqueline Smith of The New Zealand Herald gave the album a rating of three out of five and commented that "many of the songs... lack stickability and will probably merge into a fluoro-tainted pool of background pop played in cheap clothing stores." Majhid Heath of ABC Online Indigenous gave the album two-and-a-half out of five stars and wrote that it's "a non-cohesive mess of similar sounding, auto-tuned ravaged pop/R&B." Simon Sweetman of Stuff.co.nz listed Get 'Em Girls as one of the worst albums of 2011, criticizing its use of the vocoder for "slurring... meaningless words into place, buttering up the dodgy pitch and lame phrasing and allowing it to slide in and around the big crashes of the drum machine." Alasdair Duncan of Rave magazine awarded the album three stars and gave it a positive review, complimenting its "sassy floor fillers and ballads" for sounding well-produced.

Get 'Em Girls debuted at number six on the ARIA Albums Chart on 15 November 2010, and became Mauboy's second top-ten album. It was certified platinum by the Australian Recording Industry Association for shipments of more than 70,000 units. Get 'Em Girls won 'Album of 2010' at the POPrepublic.tv IT List Awards, and was nominated for 'Album of the Year' at the 2011 National Indigenous Music Awards.

== Track listing ==
| No. | Title | Writer(s) | Producer(s) | Length |
|---|---|---|---|---|
| 1. | "Get 'Em Girls" (featuring Snoop Dogg) | David Bruchanan; Bangladesh; Snoop Dogg | Shondrae "Mr Bangladesh" Crawford | 3:56 |
| 2. | "Handle It" | Pierre Medor; Thurston Hargrove; Bianca Atterberry; Gary White | Jazze Pha; KG & Carlin | 3:18 |
| 3. | "Accelerate That" | Dwayne Nesmith; Tyrrell Bing; Dominic Gordon; Shantee Tyler; Brandon Hesson | Tha Cornaboyz | 3:00 |
| 4. | "Scariest Part" | E. Kidd Bogart; Chuck Harmony; Andrew Dorff; Jessica Mauboy | Harmony | 3:27 |
| 5. | "Saturday Night" (featuring Ludacris) | Angie Iron; Brian Kennedy; Ludacris; Mauboy | Kennedy | 3:25 |
| 6. | "What Happened to Us" (featuring Jay Sean) | Josh Alexander; Billy Steinberg; Jeremy Skaller; Rob Larow; Khaled Rohaim; Israel Cruz; Jay Sean | Jremy; Bobby Bass; Cruz^{[a]}; Khaled^{[a]} | 3:19 |
| 7. | "Reconnected" | Nesmith; Bing; Gordon; Tyler; Hesson | Tha Cornaboyz | 3:35 |
| 8. | "Like This" (featuring Iyaz) | Mauboy; Audius Mtawarira; Leon Seenandan; Keidran Jones; Steve Lobel; Sean Parekh | Mtawarira; Seenandan | 3:41 |
| 9. | "Foreign" | Crystal Nicole; Ronnie Jackson; Philip Cornish; Mauboy | Lil' Ronnie; Cristyle^{[b]} | 3:47 |
| 10. | "Can Anybody Tell Me" | H. Smith; Fredrik Odesjo; Andreas Levander | Fredro; Levander^{[c]} | 4:34 |
| 11. | "Fight for You" | Harvey Mason, Jr.; Mauboy; Mansur Zafr; Dewain Whitmore Jr. | Mason Jr.; Zafr | 3:48 |
| 12. | "Maze" | Mauboy; Claude Kelly; Michael R. Mentore; Odesjo; Levander | Fredro; Levander^{[c]}; Kelly^{[b]} | 4:01 |
| 13. | "Here for Me" | Mason, Jr.; Steven Russell; Whitmore Jr. | Mason Jr.; Zafr | 4:03 |
| 14. | "No One Like You" | Jackson; Mauboy; Tiyon "TC" Mack; Nicole | Lil' Ronnie; Cristyle^{[b]} | 4:05 |

Limited edition bonus track
| No. | Title | Writer(s) | Producer(s) | Length |
|---|---|---|---|---|
| 15. | "Forget Your Name" | Mauboy; Kelly; Mentore; Odesjo; Levander | Fredro; Kelly^{[b]} | 4:09 |

iTunes bonus track
| No. | Title | Writer(s) | Producer(s) | Length |
|---|---|---|---|---|
| 15. | "Not Me" | Mauboy; Mtawarira; Seenandan | Mtawarira; Seenandan | 3:30 |

=== Deluxe edition ===
Disc one
| No. | Title | Writer(s) | Producer(s) | Length |
|---|---|---|---|---|
| 1. | "Run" | Christopher Rojas; Alex James; Jessica Mauboy; A. Breingan | Rojas | 3:25 |
| 2. | "Nobody Knows" | Andre Harris; James; Mauboy; Nikholai Greene; Kasey Phillips | Harris; Phillips; Greene | 3:56 |
| 3. | "Like This" (featuring Iyaz) | Mauboy; Mtawarira; Seenandan; Jones; Lobel; Parekh | Mtawarira; Seenandan | 3:41 |
| 4. | "Saturday Night" (featuring Ludacris) | Iron; Kennedy; Ludacris; Mauboy | Kennedy | 3:25 |
| 5. | "Maze" | Mauboy; Kelly; Mentore; Odesjo; Levander | Fredro; Levander^{[c]}; Kelly^{[b]} | 4:01 |
| 6. | "Scariest Part" | Bogart; Harmony; Dorff; Mauboy | Harmony | 3:27 |
| 7. | "Not Me" | Mauboy; Mtawarira; Seenandan | Mtawarira; Seenandan | 3:30 |
| 8. | "Inescapable" (Youngboyz Mix) | Diane Warren | Youngboyz; Anthony Egizii^{[b]}; David Musumeci^{[b]} | 3:35 |
| 9. | "Reconnected" | Nesmith; Bing; Gordon; Tyler; Hesson | Tha Cornaboyz | 3:35 |
| 10. | "What Happened to Us" (featuring Jay Sean) | Alexander; Steinberg; Skaller; Larow; Rohaim; Cruz; Sean | Jremy; Bass; Cruz^{[a]}; Khaled^{[a]} | 3:19 |
| 11. | "Forget Your Name" | Mauboy; Kelly; Mentore; Odesjo; Levander | Fredro; Kelly^{[b]} | 4:04 |
| 12. | "Can Anybody Tell Me" | Smith; Odesjo; Levander | Fredro; Levander^{[c]} | 4:34 |
| 13. | "Make It Alright" | Mason, Jr.; Russell; Whitmore Jr.; Andrew Hey | Mason Jr.; Zafr | 4:03 |
| 14. | "Galaxy" (featuring Stan Walker) | Richard Vission; Ferras Alqaisi; Brett McLaughlin; Chico Bennett; Brad Ackley | Vission; Bennett; Ackley^{[a]}; Braddon Williams^{[b]}; Anthony Egizii^{[b]}; David Musumeci^{[b]} | 4:04 |

Disc two
| No. | Title | Writer(s) | Producer(s) | Length |
|---|---|---|---|---|
| 1. | "Get 'Em Girls (Music Is My Business Remix)" (featuring Chizzy) | Bruchanan; Charles "Chizzy" Stephens | Charles "Chizzy" Stephens | 3:38 |
| 2. | "Saturday Night (DCUP Remix)" (featuring Ludacris) | Iron; Kennedy; Ludacris; Mauboy | Kennedy | 3:32 |
| 3. | "What Happened to Us (OFM Remix)" (featuring Jay Sean) | Alexander; Steinberg; Skaller; Larow; Rohaim; Cruz; Sean | Jremy; Bass; Cruz^{[a]}; Khaled^{[a]} | 3:38 |
| 4. | "Saturday Night (Sgt Slick Remix)" (featuring Ludacris) | Iron; Kennedy; Ludacris; Mauboy | Kennedy | 6:17 |
| 5. | "Accelerate That" | Nesmith; Bing; Gordon; Tyler; Hesson | Tha Cornaboyz | 3:00 |
| 6. | "Inescapable" (OFM Mix) | Dianne Warren | Youngboyz; Anthony Egizii^{[b]}; David Musumeci^{[b]} | 3:33 |
| 7. | "Handle It" | Medor; Hargrove; Atterberry; White | Jazze Pha; KG & Carlin | 3:18 |
| 8. | "Foreign" | Nicole; Jackson; Cornish; Mauboy | Lil' Ronnie; Cristyle^{[b]} | 3:47 |
| 9. | "Fight for You" | Mason, Jr.; Mauboy; Zafr; Whitmore Jr. | Mason Jr.; Zafr | 3:48 |
| 10. | "Here for Me" | Mason, Jr.; Russell; Whitmore Jr. | Mason Jr.; Zafr | 4:03 |
| 11. | "No One Like You" | Jackson; Mauboy; Mack; Nicole | Lil' Ronnie; Cristyle^{[b]} | 4:05 |

Notes

- ^{^a} signifies an additional producer
- ^{^b} signifies a vocal producer
- ^{^c} signifies a co-producer

== Personnel ==
Credits adapted from album booklet.

- Phil Tan – mixing
- Braddon Williams – vocal engineer, vocal producer
- Victor Wainstein – assistant engineering
- Dave Kutch – mastering
- Fabian Marasciullo – mixing
- Bangladesh – production
- Chuck Harmony – production
- Israel Cruz – additional production
- Khaled – additional production
- Cristyle – vocal production
- Fredrik "Fredro" Odesjo – production, instruments
- Andreas Levander – instruments, co-production
- Philip Cornish – additional keys
- Brian Kennedy – production
- Damien Lewis – assistant mixing
- John Frye – mixing
- George Antoni – photography
- Harvey Mason, Jr. – production, mixing
- Mansur Zafr – production
- Tom Coyne – mastering
- Lil' Ronnie – production
- Jazze Pha – production
- KG – production
- Carlin – production
- Tha Corna Boyz – production
- Jremy – production
- Bobbybass – production
- Audius Mtawarira – production
- Leon Seenandan – production
- Jessica Mauboy – vocals
- Youngboyz – production

== Charts ==
=== Weekly charts ===
Weekly chart performance for Get 'Em Girls
| Chart (2010) | Peak position |
|---|---|
| Australian Albums (ARIA) | 6 |
| Australian Urban Albums (ARIA) | 1 |

=== Year-end charts ===
2010 year-end chart performance for Get 'Em Girls
| Chart (2010) | Rank |
|---|---|
| Australian Urban Albums Chart | 20 |
| Australian Artists Albums Chart | 30 |

2011 year-end chart performance for Get 'Em Girls
| Chart (2011) | Rank |
|---|---|
| Australian Albums Chart | 85 |
| Australian Urban Albums Chart | 20 |

== Certifications ==
Certifications for Get 'Em Girls
| Region | Certification | Certified units/sales |
|---|---|---|
| Australia (ARIA) | Platinum | 70,000^{^} |
^{^} Shipments figures based on certification alone.

== Release history ==
Release history and formats for Get 'Em Girls
| Region | Date | Format | Edition(s) | Label | Catalogue |
|---|---|---|---|---|---|
| Australia | 5 November 2010 | CD; digital download | Standard; limited | Sony Music Australia | 88697803852 |
| Australia | 12 August 2011 | CD; digital download | Deluxe | Sony Music Australia | 88697907062 |
