= Galaxy (Jessica Mauboy song) =

Single by Jessica Mauboy featuring Stan Walker

from the album Get 'Em Girls (Deluxe Edition)
- Released: 28 October 2011
- Recorded: May 2011
- Length: 3:25 (single version); 4:04 (album version)
- Label: Sony
- Songwriters: Richard Vission; Ferras Alqaisi; Brett McLaughlin; Dominique Calvillo; Chico Bennett; Brad Ackley
- Producers: Richard Vission; Chico Bennett; Brad Ackley; Braddon Williams; Anthony Egizii; David Musumeci

Jessica Mauboy singles chronology
"Inescapable" (2011)	"Galaxy" (2011)	"Gotcha" (2012)

Stan Walker singles chronology
"Light It Up" (2011)	"Galaxy" (2011)	"Music Won't Break Your Heart" (2012)

Music video
- "Galaxy" on YouTube

"Galaxy" is a song by Australian singer Jessica Mauboy featuring Australian-New Zealand singer Stan Walker. It was written by Richard Vission, Ferras Alqaisi, Brett McLaughlin, Dominique Calvillo, Chico Bennett and Brad Ackley. Production for the song was handled by Vission, Bennett, Ackley, Braddon Williams, Anthony Egizii and David Musumeci. "Galaxy" was released digitally on 28 October 2011, as the fifth single from Mauboy's second studio album Get 'Em Girls (2010). It peaked at number 13 on the ARIA Singles Chart and number seven on the ARIA Urban Singles Chart. "Galaxy" also became Mauboy's first charting release in New Zealand, where it reached number 36.

== Background and release ==
In May 2011, Walker revealed to Herald Sun that he and Mauboy recorded a duet that would be released later in the year. He explained, "It's the first time Australia has had two urban kind of R&B acts doing a duet together ... The song was written for us, but it's definitely our song. It's a beast, that's all I can say". "Galaxy" was written by Richard Vission, Ferras Alqaisi, Brett McLaughlin, Dominique Calvillo, Chico Bennett and Brad Ackley. Production for the song was handled by Vission, Bennett, Ackley, Braddon Williams, Anthony Egizii and David Musumeci. Mauboy posted a video on YouTube of herself discussing the song, saying "It is a very special song. I remember listening to it with Stan and we were just like 'oh my gosh this song is crazy' ... you know talking about [a] galaxy, talking about a relationship that ... there's no way that we can ever part and ... its just that ... one who you love type of song". "Galaxy" was released digitally on 28 October 2011. A digital extended play was released on 9 December 2011, which featured the album version of "Galaxy" and remixes of Mauboy's previous singles "Inescapable", "What Happened to Us" and "Running Back".

== Reception ==
"Galaxy" debuted at number 28 on the ARIA Singles Chart on 7 November 2011, and peaked at number 13 the following week. On 28 November 2011, the song debuted and peaked at number seven on the ARIA Urban Singles Chart. "Galaxy" was certified platinum by the Australian Recording Industry Association (ARIA), denoting sales of 70,000 copies. "Galaxy" debuted on the New Zealand Singles Chart at number 40 on 28 November 2011, and became Mauboy's first charting single in that country. It peaked at number 36 on 13 February 2012. At the 2011 IT List Awards, "Galaxy" was nominated for Single of 2011. In 2012, it won Single of the Year at the Deadly Awards and was nominated for Song of the Year at the ARIA Music Awards.

== Promotion ==
The music video was filmed in Clovelly, New South Wales and premiered online on 1 November 2011. The first half of the video shows Walker and Mauboy at the beach and the second half shows the pair in front of a black backdrop surrounded by flying objects. They are then seen back on the beach, where several shooting comets land in the ocean. Intercut scenes throughout the video show different planets from Outer space, and a shooting comet heading towards Planet Earth. Mauboy and Walker performed "Galaxy" on The X Factor Australia on 1 November 2011, and on Sunrise on 29 November 2011.

== Track listing ==
- Digital download
1. "Galaxy" featuring Stan Walker – 3:25
- Digital EP
1. "Galaxy" featuring Stan Walker (Album version) – 4:02
2. "Inescapable" (Mix FM Up Close & Personal) – 3:57
3. "What Happened to Us" featuring Stan Walker – 3:18
4. "Running Back" (Mix FM Up Close & Personal) – 4:06

== Credits and personnel ==
Credits adapted from Get 'Em Girls (Deluxe Edition) liner notes.

- Brad Ackley – songwriter, additional producer
- Ferras Alqaisi – songwriter
- Chico Bennett – producer, songwriter
- Dominique Calvillo – songwriter
- Tom Coyne – mastering
- Anthony Egizii – vocal producer
- Damien Lewis – additional/assistant engineer
- Brett McLaughlin – songwriter
- Phil Tan – mixer
- Richard Vission – producer, songwriter
- Braddon Williams – vocal engineer, vocal producer
- David Musumeci – vocal producer

== Charts ==
=== Weekly charts ===
Chart (2011)	Peak position
ARIA Singles Chart	13
ARIA Urban Singles Chart	7
New Zealand Singles Chart	36

=== Year-end charts ===
Chart (2011)	Position
Australian Artist Singles Chart	10

Chart (2012)	Position
Australian Artist Singles Chart	36

== Certifications ==
Region	Certification	Certified units/sales
Australia (ARIA)	Platinum	70,000^{^}
New Zealand (RMNZ)	Gold	7,500^{*}
^{*} Sales figures based on certification alone.^{^} Shipments figures based on certification alone.
