= Light It Up (Stan Walker song) =

Single by Stan Walker featuring Static Revenger

from the album Let the Music Play
- Released: 16 September 2011
- Recorded: 2011
- Genre: Pop; dance-pop; electropop
- Length: 3:30
- Label: Sony
- Songwriter(s): Dennis White; John Locke; Charissa Saverio; Jon Asher
- Producer(s): Static Revenger

Stan Walker singles chronology
"Loud" (2011)	"Light It Up" (2011)	"Galaxy" (2011)

Static Revenger singles chronology
"Long Time" (2011)	"Light It Up" (2011)

"Light It Up" is a song by New Zealand recording artist Stan Walker, which features American DJ, Static Revenger. It was released for digital download on 16 September 2011, as the second single from Walker's third studio album, Let the Music Play. The song was written by Dennis White, John Locke, Charissa Saverio and Jon Asher, and was produced by Static Revenger.

== Background ==
"Light It Up" was written by Jon Asher, Dennis White, John Locke and Charissa Saverio and was produced by Static Revenger. A snippet of the track was released online on 8 September 2011. It was then sent to Australian contemporary hit radio on 12 September, and was released for digital download on 16 September. In an interview with Nova FM, Walker spoke about the song, saying, "It's a really dance-y, fun track. It's kind of representing where I am at the moment ... where I am heading at the moment and it's just a song to ... lift people's spirits up."

== Reception ==
A writer for Take 40 Australia wrote that, "This snappy new track is an awesome party starter and will have your toes tapping for sure!" On 26 September 2011, "Light It Up" debuted and peaked at number 23 on the New Zealand Singles Chart. On 7 November 2011, it debuted at number 45 on the Australian ARIA Singles Chart.

== Music video ==
The music video for "Light It Up" premiered online on 16 September 2011. The video opens with various shots of Walker inside a construction site with flashing lights, listening to music on his iPad. Throughout the video, Walker is shown singing in front of pipes with flames on them, as well as intercut scenes of dance group Saea Banyana shown performing choreography.

== Track listing ==
- Digital download
1. "Light It Up" (featuring Static Revenger) – 3:30
2. "Light It Up" (Extended Club Mix) – 6:35
3. "Light It Up" (Static Revenger Dub) – 6:34

== Credits and personnel ==
Credits adapted from Let the Music Play liner notes.

- Jon Asher – songwriter
- Tom Coyne – mastering
- James Kang – assistant mixer
- John Locke – songwriter
- Charissa Saverio – songwriter
- Miles Walker – mixer
- Dennis "Static Revenger" White – songwriter, producer

== Charts ==
=== Weekly charts ===
Chart (2011)	Peak position
ARIA Singles Chart	45
New Zealand Singles Chart	23

=== Year-end charts ===
Chart (2011)	Rank
Australian Artists Singles Chart	40
New Zealand Artists Singles Chart	16

== Certifications ==
Certifications and sales for "Light It Up"
Region	Certification	Certified units/sales
Australia (ARIA)	Gold	35,000^{^}
New Zealand (RMNZ)	Gold	7,500^{*}
^{*} Sales figures based on certification alone.^{^} Shipments figures based on certification alone.
