= Unbroken (Stan Walker song) =

Single by Stan Walker

from the album From the Inside Out
- Released: 12 April 2010
- Studio: Artisan, Birmingham
- Genre: Pop
- Length: 4:34
- Label: Sony
- Songwriter: Ryan Tedder
- Producer: Ryan Tedder

Stan Walker singles chronology
"Black Box" (2009)	"Unbroken" (2010)	"Stand Up" (2010)

Audio sample
- file; help

"Unbroken" is a song performed by Australian-New Zealand recording artist Stan Walker. Written and produced by OneRepublic frontman Ryan Tedder, the song was released by Sony Music Australia on 12 April 2010 as the lead single from Walker's second album, From the Inside Out. Walker felt privileged to record a song written by Tedder and complimented him, "He's the man, one of the best songwriters and producers in the world. I am so blessed." The piano-based pop ballad received a mixed response from critics.

"Unbroken" was promoted by performances on Sunrise and Hey Hey It's Saturday and a Matthew Chuang-directed music video, filmed in Melbourne. The single peaked at number nine on the New Zealand Singles Chart and number twenty-three on the ARIA Singles Chart, and lasted thirteen and seventeen weeks on the charts, respectively.

== Background and composition ==
"Unbroken" was written and produced by OneRepublic leader Ryan Tedder, who was behind singles such as Beyoncé Knowles' "Halo" (2009) and Leona Lewis' "Bleeding Love" (2007). "Unbroken" was recorded at Artisan Studios in Birmingham, England, and Phil Tan mixed the record at Soapbox Studios, Atlanta, Georgia. Walker was honoured by the opportunity to record a piece of Tedder's work. Walker told the Daily Telegraph, "It is a privilege for me to record a song by the guy who wrote 'Halo' for Beyoncé and 'Bleeding Love' for Leona. He's the man, one of the best songwriters and producers in the world. I am so blessed." In an interview with MTV Australia he said, "The song is so amazing. When I first heard the song I was like this is a beat song and then I read the lyrics and that's what won me over because it talks about my life, being nothing and being in pieces, but then becoming unbroken." "Unbroken" is a piano-driven pop music ballad, and features a repetitive chorus.

== Release and reception ==
"Unbroken" was released as a one-track digital download on 12 April 2010 in New Zealand, and was sent to Australian contemporary hit radio the same day. A digital extended play (EP) was released in several countries on 20 April 2010; it also contains an acoustic version of "Black Box" and an a cappella version of "Unbroken". The Compact Disc single for "Unbroken" was released in Australia on 24 April 2010; it features an Israel remix and the a cappella version of the song.

"Unbroken" received mixed reviews from music critics. Scott Kara of The New Zealand Herald called it "chest-beating and uplifting", while Allmusic's Jon O'Brien saw the song as very similar to Tedder's previous writings. "Unbroken" debuted on the New Zealand Singles Chart at number twenty-nine on 19 April 2010. The following week it jumped to number twelve, and moved into its peak position of number nine on 31 May 2010. "Unbroken" spent a total of thirteen weeks on the New Zealand Singles Chart, including two weeks in the top ten and nine weeks in the top twenty. On 1 August 2010 the Recording Industry Association of New Zealand (RIANZ) certified "Unbroken" gold, marking the sale of 7,500 copies in New Zealand. "Unbroken" entered the Australian ARIA Singles Chart at number twenty-seven, before reaching its peak of number twenty-three in its fifth week. On 6 September 2010 the song fell out of the ARIA Singles Chart, having spent seventeen non-consecutive weeks on the chart. "Unbroken" was certified gold by the Australian Recording Industry Association (ARIA), which denotes the shipment of 35,000 units. It also spent twenty-four weeks on the ARIA Urban Singles Chart, and peaked at number three.

== Music video and live performances ==
The music video for "Unbroken" was shot in Melbourne and Sydney, Australia on 8 April 2010 and was directed by Matthew Chuang. It features Walker singing in various locations in Melbourne including Degraves Street and Flinders Lane. Walker said to MTV's Clippin' that shooting the video in public made him feel embarrassed and he found it difficult not to laugh during its filming.

The video opens with the camera rotating around Walker at an intersection as he slowly raises his head, before he is shown walking down a shop-lined street. As the song begins, Walker starts singing in an empty narrow alleyway. Examples of broken people are shown, such as a girl being pushed around and teased before she plugs headphones into her ears, a man watching over a hospital patient, and individuals waiting for others to show up. Walker passes a bench of people reading newspapers with the respective headlines, "Attacked", "War", "When Will It End?" and "Act of Hate", while the final newspaper headline reads "Hope". At the end of the video the now "unbroken" characters shot in Martin Place are shown to be content, and Walker makes his way down a darkened alley.

Walker performed "Unbroken" on Hey Hey It's Saturday on 5 May 2010. He also performed the song on Sunrise on 13 May 2010.

== Charts ==
=== Weekly charts ===
Chart (2010)	Peak position
ARIA Singles Chart	23
ARIA Urban Singles Chart	7
New Zealand Singles Chart	9

=== Year-end charts ===
Chart (2010)	Position
Australian Artists Singles Chart	21

== Certifications ==
Certifications and sales for "Unbroken"
Region	Certification	Certified units/sales
Australia (ARIA)	Gold	35,000^{^}
New Zealand (RMNZ)	Gold	7,500^{*}
^{*} Sales figures based on certification alone.^{^} Shipments figures based on certification alone.

== Track listing ==
- CD single
1. "Unbroken" – 4:34
2. "Unbroken" (Israel remix) – 3:46
3. "Unbroken" (A cappella) – 4:18
- Digital EP
1. "Unbroken" – 4:34
2. "Black Box" (acoustic) – 3:28
3. "Unbroken" (A cappella) – 4:18

== Personnel ==
- Marcus Byrne – assistant engineering
- Stuart Crichton – vocal production
- Damien Lewis – assistant mixing
- Phil Tan – mixing
- Ryan Tedder – writing, production, engineering, programming and arrangement, piano, drum programming, backing vocals

== Release history ==
Country	Date	Format	Label
New Zealand	12 April 2010	Digital download	Sony Music Australia
Australia	20 April 2010	Download EP	Sony Music Australia
Belgium	20 April 2010	Download EP	Sony Music Australia
Canada	20 April 2010	Download EP	Sony Music Australia
Denmark	20 April 2010	Download EP	Sony Music Australia
Finland	20 April 2010	Download EP	Sony Music Australia
France	20 April 2010	Download EP	Sony Music Australia
Germany	20 April 2010	Download EP	Sony Music Australia
Ireland	20 April 2010	Download EP	Sony Music Australia
New Zealand	20 April 2010	Download EP	Sony Music Australia
Norway	20 April 2010	Download EP	Sony Music Australia
Portugal	20 April 2010	Download EP	Sony Music Australia
Sweden	20 April 2010	Download EP	Sony Music Australia
United Kingdom	20 April 2010	Download EP	Sony Music Australia
Australia	24 April 2010	CD single	Sony Music Australia
