= Choose You =

Single by Stan Walker

from the album From the Inside Out
- Released: 20 July 2010
- Recorded: 2010
- Genre: Pop; R&B
- Length: 3:39
- Label: Sony
- Songwriters: Cassie Davis; Carl Dimataga; Stuart Crichton
- Producers: Stuart Crichton; Cassie Davis; Phil Tan

Stan Walker singles chronology
"Stuck in a Box" (2010)	"Choose You" (2010)	"Homesick" (2010)

Audio sample
- file; help

"Choose You" is a song by Australian-New Zealand recording artist Stan Walker, released as the second single from his second studio album, From the Inside Out, on 20 July 2010. The pop, R&B song was written by Stuart Crichton, Carl Dimataga and Cassie Davis, with the latter also handling its production with Stuart Crichton and Phil Tan. "Choose You" received positive reviews from music critics, who complimented its stomping beats and noted that it was radio-friendly. On the New Zealand Singles Chart, the song peaked at number three and was certified platinum by the Recording Industry Association of New Zealand (RIANZ). It also peaked at number 16 on the Australian ARIA Singles Chart and was certified platinum by the Australian Recording Industry Association (ARIA). An accompanying music video was directed by Marc Furmie and was released on 5 August 2010. It features Walker having to choose between his former girlfriend or his music career.

== Background and release ==
"Choose You" was written by Stuart Crichton, Cassie Davis and Carl Dimataga. On working with Davis, Walker explained, "I'd only met Cassie [Davis] once before at the Aria Awards and we hit it off the first time we met, but I really didn't know her that well. I loved the song when I first heard it, and I loved the way she wrote it – it sounded awesome. There's a real magic to the song – it's a wicked pop song mixed with a little old skool R&B." Before the song was released for digital download, Walker gave an exclusive acoustic performance of "Choose You" to MusicFix. "Choose You" was sent to Australian contemporary hit radio on 12 July 2010. A week later, it became the fifth most added song to Australian radio, and the second most added song to New Zealand radio.

The song was released digitally in Australia and New Zealand on 20 July 2010. The Compact Disc single was released in Australia on 30 July 2010, and featured a remix of the song and two bonus tracks. An extended play of "Choose You" was also released the same date, and featured two remixes of "Choose You".

== Reception ==
Scott Kara from The New Zealand Herald chose "Choose You" as one of the best tracks of From the Inside Out, appreciating its "soaring pop and grand stomp". Cameron Adams from The Daily Telegraph wrote that the song was radio-friendly and catchy. Drew Taylor from Warcry described "Choose You" as an "infectious song" and noted that it has "chart potential". On the New Zealand Singles Chart, "Choose You" debuted at number seven on 26 July 2010. The song peaked at number three on 6 September 2010, where it remained for five consecutive weeks. It was certified platinum by the Recording Industry Association of New Zealand (RIANZ), for selling 15,000 copies. In Australia, "Choose You" debuted at number 33 on the ARIA Singles Chart on 16 August 2010, and peaked at number 16 on 30 August. It was certified platinum by the Australian Recording Industry Association (ARIA), for selling 70,000 copies.

== Music video ==
Released on 5 August, the music video for the song was directed by Marc Furmie, and filmed in Sydney. The plot shows Walker having to choose between his former girlfriend or his music career. It begins with Walker's partner packing and leaving, after which Walker reminisces on their relationship. On the way to a musical performance, he imagines his girlfriend being with him. At an airport following his show, Walker turns around and 'chooses' his partner.

== Track listing ==
- Digital download
1. "Choose You" – 3:39
- Digital EP
1. "Choose You" – 3:39
2. "Choose You" featuring Israel and Miracle (Israel Remix) – 3:50
3. "Choose You" (Jayou Remix) – 4:06
- Australia CD single
1. "Choose You"
2. "Choose You" (Remix)
3. "Left Lonely"
4. "Stand Up"

== Personnel ==
- Stuart Crichton – keys, production, programming, writing
- Cassie Davis – keys, production, writing
- Carl Dimataga – guitar, writing
- Damien Lewis – assistant mixing
- Phil Tan – additional production, mixing

== Charts ==
=== Weekly charts ===
Chart (2010)	Peak position
ARIA Singles Chart	16
New Zealand Singles Chart	3

=== Year-end charts ===
Chart (2010)	Position
Australian Artists Singles Chart	17
New Zealand Singles Chart	15

== Certifications ==
Certifications and sales for "Choose You"
Region	Certification	Certified units/sales
Australia (ARIA)	Platinum	70,000^{^}
New Zealand (RMNZ)	Platinum	15,000^{*}
^{*} Sales figures based on certification alone.^{^} Shipments figures based on certification alone.

== Release history ==
Country	Date	Format	Label
Australia	12 July 2010	Contemporary hit radio	Sony Music Australia
Australia	20 July 2010	Digital download	Sony Music Australia
Australia	30 July 2010	CD single, digital EP	Sony Music Australia
New Zealand	20 July 2010	Digital download	Sony Music Australia
New Zealand	30 July 2010	Digital EP	Sony Music Australia
