= Saturday Night (Jessica Mauboy song) =

Single by Jessica Mauboy featuring Ludacris

from the album Get 'Em Girls
- Released: 27 October 2010
- Recorded: 2010
- Genre: Dance-pop
- Length: 3:25
- Label: Sony
- Songwriters: Angie Irons; Brian Kennedy; Ludacris
- Producer: Brian Kennedy

Jessica Mauboy singles chronology
"Get 'Em Girls" (2010)	"Saturday Night" (2010)	"What Happened to Us" (2011)

Ludacris singles chronology
"I Like" (2010)	"Saturday Night" (2010)	"Tonight (I'm Lovin' You)" (2010)

Audio sample
- file; help

Music video
- "Saturday Night" on YouTube

"Saturday Night" is a song by Australian recording artist Jessica Mauboy, featuring American rapper Ludacris. It was released as the second single from Mauboy's second studio album, Get 'Em Girls, on 27 October 2010. The song was written by Angie Iron, Mauboy, Ludacris and Brian Kennedy, and was produced by Kennedy.

Musically, "Saturday Night" is a dance-pop song that includes elements of electropop and techno in its instrumentation; it utilizes a synthesizer beat and heavy drums. Both Jessica Mauboy and Ludacris's vocals are Auto-Tuned.

"Saturday Night" peaked at number seven on the ARIA Singles Chart and was certified double platinum by the Australian Recording Industry Association (ARIA) for sales of 140,000 copies, making it Mauboy's highest-charting single since 2008's "Burn" and highest-selling single since her debut, "Running Back." An accompanying music video was directed by Hype Williams, and features tinted lighting and fast-paced graphics throughout; the video went on to achieve over 1 million views on YouTube/Vevo. "Saturday Night" was nominated for 'Highest Selling Single' at the 2011 ARIA Music Awards. Mauboy also recorded a simlish version of the song titled, "Surbiduh Nye", for the video game, The Sims 3: Late Night.

== Background and composition ==
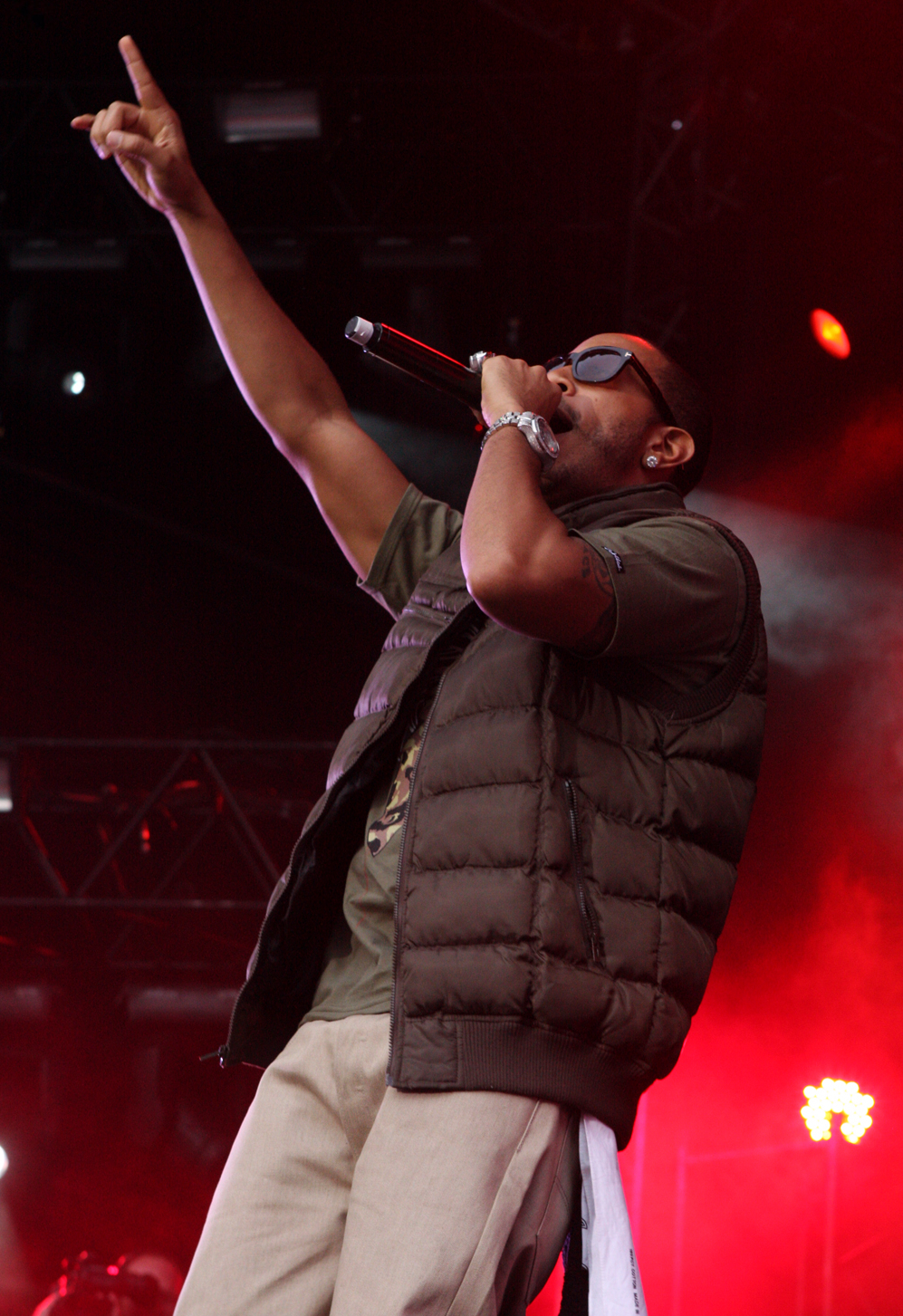
Ludacris (pictured) co-wrote "Saturday Night" and contributed a featured rap verse.

"Saturday Night" was written by Angie Iron, Brian Kennedy and Ludacris, with Kennedy also producing the track alongside Israel Cruz and Khaled Rohaim. The rap verse on the song was written by Ludacris. When Mauboy heard the original verse, she was not happy with it and had Ludacris re-write it again.

"Saturday Night" is written using E minor, D, and C chords in its intro. It is a dance-pop tune which features instrumentation from both keyboard and drums, and uses a synthesized backing. Both Jessica Mauboy and Ludacris use auto-tune. Lyrically, the song is about Mauboy and her girlfriends getting ready to go to a party, and taking to the streets in their Aston Martin DB9. Ludacris's rap verse is somewhat more sexualized.

Mauboy also recorded a simlish version of the song re-titled, "Surbiduh Nye". The song was recorded to help promote the video game, The Sims 3: Late Night. "Saturday Night" was released digitally on 27 October 2010, and was sent to Australian contemporary hit radio on 1 November.

== Reception ==
=== Critical response ===
Majhid Heath of ABC Online Indigenous wrote that the song is a "fun dance number that'll help start off the Saturday nights of teenagers across the country." The song was nominated for 'Single of 2010' at the 2010 IT List Awards and 'Highest Selling Single' at the 2011 ARIA Music Awards.

On 5 July 2016, the staff at 105.7 FM ("PopCrush 105.7") listed "Saturday Night" as one of the 'Best Weekend Songs', commenting that the track is "[t]he essential girls night out anthem. LAYDIESSSS!"

=== Chart performance ===
"Saturday Night" debuted at number 13 on the ARIA Singles Chart on 22 November 2010. It peaked at number seven on 27 December, where it remained for two consecutive weeks. "Saturday Night" was certified double platinum by the Australian Recording Industry Association (ARIA), for selling 140,000 copies.

== Music video ==
=== Background & Release ===
The music video for the song was directed by Hype Williams and was filmed in Los Angeles along with the video for "Get 'Em Girls". It premiered on YouTube on 11 November 2010. A second version of the video without a guest appearance from Ludacris, was released on 2 December 2010.

=== Synopsis & Reception ===
Throughout the video, it shows tinted lighting and fast-paced graphics. The video features close-up shots of Mauboy singing the song wearing a blue dress and large rounded earrings, with much makeup. There are also intercut snippets of a DB9 driving swiftly along a highway with a license plate reading "JP Logistics", an anonymous dancer on a bar seat with curly hair, and city scenes including neon signage. Mauboy herself can be seen wearing a fox fur and dancing at a club with some girlfriends, while holding a glass of champagne, and a bottle of alcohol is also pictured. Ludacris makes a cameo appearance, raising his sunglasses to reveal himself in the beginning and illuminating the neon lighting with his hands in his rap solo. The video ends with Mauboy and her girlfriends parking their DB9 and getting out, and she is wearing a sparkling dress and a cap.

Editors from MusicFix were impressed with the video and wrote that, "Mauboy gets sexier in each subsequent music video". A writer for The Fix wrote ahead of the video's release that it was going to be "one awesome video" and noted that Hype Williams is "responsible for Kanye West and Jamie Foxx's 'Gold Digger' and Beyonce's 'Diva'."

== Live performances ==
Mauboy performed "Saturday Night" on The X Factor (Australia) on 8 November 2010, followed by a performance of the song at the 2010 Perth Telethon on 13 November 2010. On 27 November 2010, she performed the song on Hey Hey It's Saturday. On 4 December 2010, Mauboy participated in the YouTube Live Sessions program, where she performed several of the album's songs, including "Saturday Night". On 7 December 2010, Mauboy performed the song on the Today Show, which was broadcast in Gold Coast, Queensland. On 10 December 2010, she performed the song at Federation Square in Melbourne, ahead of Oprah Winfrey's visit to the place. On 26 January 2011, Mauboy performed "Saturday Night" at the Australia Day Live Concert, held on the grounds of the Parliament House in Canberra.

== Track listing ==
- Digital download
1. "Saturday Night" (featuring Ludacris) – 3:25
- Digital EP
1. "Saturday Night" (No Rap Edit) – 3:12
2. "Saturday Night" (featuring Ludacris) – 3:25
3. "Saturday Night" (Christian Luke Radio Edit) – 3:48

== Personnel ==
- Songwriting – Angie Iron, Brian Kennedy, Ludacris
- Production – Brian Kennedy
- Additional production – Israel Cruz, Khaled Rohaim
- Mixing – Phil Tan
- Additional mixing – Damien Lewis
- Mastering – Tom Coyne

== Charts ==
=== Weekly chart ===
Chart (2010)	Peak position
Australia (ARIA)	7

=== Year-end charts ===
Chart (2010)	Rank
ARIA Singles Chart	73
Australian Artists Singles Chart	8
Chart (2011)	Rank
Australian Artists Singles Chart	12

== Certification ==
Region	Certification	Certified units/sales
Australia (ARIA)	2× Platinum	140,000^{^}
^{^} Shipments figures based on certification alone.

== Release history ==
Country	Date	Format	Label
Australia	27 October 2010	Digital download	Sony Music Australia
Australia	1 November 2010	Contemporary hit radio	Sony Music Australia
Australia	17 December 2010	Digital EP	Sony Music Australia

== See also ==
- List of top 10 singles in 2010 (Australia)
