= What Happened to Us =

Single by Jessica Mauboy featuring Jay Sean

from the album Get 'Em Girls
- Released: 10 March 2011
- Genre: R&B
- Length: 3:19
- Label: Sony
- Songwriters: Josh Alexander; Billy Steinberg; Jeremy Skaller; Rob Larow; Khaled Rohaim; Israel Cruz; Jay Sean
- Producers: Jeremy Skaller; Bobby Bass; Israel Cruz; Khaled Rohaim

Jessica Mauboy singles chronology
"Saturday Night" (2010)	"What Happened to Us" (2011)	"Inescapable" (2011)

Jay Sean singles chronology
"Every Little Part of Me" (2011)	"What Happened to Us" (2011)	"Like This Like That" (2011)

Music video
- "Jessica Mauboy - What Happened to Us" on YouTube

"What Happened to Us" is a song by Australian recording artist Jessica Mauboy, featuring English recording artist Jay Sean. It was written by Sean, Josh Alexander, Billy Steinberg, Jeremy Skaller, Rob Larow, Khaled Rohaim and Israel Cruz. "What Happened to Us" was leaked online in October 2010, and was released on 10 March 2011, as the third single from Mauboy's second studio album, Get 'Em Girls (2010). The song received positive reviews from critics.

A remix of "What Happened to Us" made by production team OFM, was released on 11 April 2011. A different version of the song which features Stan Walker, was released on 29 May 2011. "What Happened to Us" charted on the ARIA Singles Chart at number 14 and was certified platinum by the Australian Recording Industry Association (ARIA). An accompanying music video was directed by Mark Alston, and reminisces on a former relationship between Mauboy and Sean.

== Production and release ==
"What Happened to Us"
A 25-second sample from Jessica Mauboy and Jay Sean's "What Happened to Us."

"What Happened to Us" was written by Josh Alexander, Billy Steinberg, Jeremy Skaller, Rob Larow, Khaled Rohaim, Israel Cruz and Jay Sean. It was produced by Skaller, Cruz, Rohaim and Bobby Bass. The song uses C, D, and B minor chords in the chorus. "What Happened to Us" was sent to contemporary hit radio in Australia on 14 February 2011. The cover art for the song was revealed on 22 February on Mauboy's official Facebook page. A CD release was available for purchase via her official website on 10 March, for one week only. It was released digitally the following day.

== Reception ==
Majhid Heath from ABC Online Indigenous called the song a "Jordin Sparks-esque duet", and wrote that it "has a nice innocence to it that rings true to the experience of losing a first love." Chris Urankar from Nine to Five wrote that it as a "mid-tempo duet ballad" which signifies Mauboy's strength as a global player. On 21 March 2011, "What Happened to Us" debuted at number 30 on the ARIA Singles Chart, and peaked at number 14 the following week. The song was certified platinum by the Australian Recording Industry Association (ARIA), for selling 70,000 copies. "What Happened to Us" spent a total of ten weeks in the ARIA top fifty.

== Music video ==
Mauboy and Sean singing the chorus of the song to each other in the video.

=== Background ===
The music video for the song was shot in the Elizabeth Bay House in Sydney on 26 November 2010. The video was shot during Sean's visit to Australia for the Summerbeatz tour. During an interview with The Daily Telegraph while on the set of the video, Sean said "the song is sick! ... Jessica's voice is amazing and we're shooting [the video] in this ridiculously beautiful mansion overlooking the harbour." The video was directed by Mark Alston, who had previously directed the video for Mauboy's single "Let Me Be Me" (2009). It premiered on YouTube on 10 February 2011.

=== Synopsis and reception ===
The video begins showing Mauboy who appears to be sitting on a yellow antique couch in a mansion, wearing a purple dress. As the video progresses, scenes of memories are displayed of Mauboy and her love interest, played by Sean, spending time there previously. It then cuts to the scenes where Sean appears in the main entrance room of the mansion. The final scene shows Mauboy outdoors in a gold dress, surrounded by green grass and trees. She is later joined by Sean who appears in a black suit and a white shirt, and together they sing the chorus of the song to each other. David Lim of Feed Limmy wrote that the video is "easily the best thing our R&B princess has committed to film – ever" and praised the "mansion and wondrous interior décor". He also commended Mauboy for choosing Australian talent to direct the video instead of American directors, which she had used for her previous two music videos. Since its release, the video has received over two million views on Vevo.

== Live performances ==
Mauboy performed "What Happened to Us" live for the first time during her YouTube Live Sessions program on 4 December 2010. She also appeared on Adam Hills in Gordon Street Tonight on 23 February 2011 for an interview and later performed the song. On 15 March 2011, Mauboy performed "What Happened to Us" on Sunrise. She also performed the song with Stan Walker during the Australian leg of Chris Brown's F.A.M.E. Tour in April 2011. Mauboy and Walker later performed "What Happened to Us" on Dancing with the Stars Australia on 29 May 2011. From November 2013 to February 2014, "What Happened to Us" was part of the set list of the To the End of the Earth Tour, Mauboy's second headlining tour of Australia, with Nathaniel Willemse singing Sean's part.

== Track listing ==
- Digital download
1. "What Happened to Us" featuring Jay Sean – 3:19
2. "What Happened to Us" featuring Jay Sean (Sgt Slick Remix) – 6:33
3. "What Happened to Us" featuring Jay Sean (Just Witness Remix) – 3:45
- CD single
1. "What Happened to Us" featuring Jay Sean (Album Version) – 3:19
2. "What Happened to Us" featuring Jay Sean (Sgt Slick Remix) – 6:33
3. "What Happened to Us" featuring Jay Sean (OFM Remix) – 3:39
- Digital download – Remix
1. "What Happened to Us" featuring Jay Sean (OFM Remix) – 3:38
- Digital download
1. "What Happened to Us" featuring Stan Walker – 3:20

== Personnel ==
- Songwriting – Josh Alexander, Billy Steinberg, Jeremy Skaller, Rob Larow, Khaled Rohaim, Israel Cruz, Jay Sean
- Production – Jeremy Skaller, Bobby Bass
- Additional production – Israel Cruz, Khaled Rohaim
- Lead vocals – Jessica Mauboy, Jay Sean
- Mixing – Phil Tan
- Additional mixing – Damien Lewis
- Mastering – Tom Coyne

== Charts ==
=== Weekly chart ===
Chart (2011)	Peak position
Australia (ARIA)	14

=== Year-end chart ===
Chart (2011)	Rank
Australian Artists Singles Chart	16

== Certification ==
Region	Certification	Certified units/sales
Australia (ARIA)	Platinum	70,000^{^}
^{^} Shipments figures based on certification alone.

== Radio dates and release history ==
Region	Date	Format	Label
Australia	14 February 2011	Contemporary hit radio	Sony Music Australia
Australia	10 March 2011	CD single	Sony Music Australia
Australia	11 March 2011	Digital download	Sony Music Australia
Australia	11 April 2011	Digital download – remix single	Sony Music Australia
Australia	29 May 2011	Digital download – feat. Stan Walker	Sony Music Australia
