= From the Inside Out =

Studio album by Stan Walker
- Released: 20 August 2010
- Genres: R&B; pop; soul
- Length: 49:35
- Label: Sony
- Producers: Audius Mtawarira; Cassie Davis; Emile; Frederik Tao; Fridolin Nordsoe; Greg Ogan; Israel Cruz; Jade Seenandan; Leon Seenandan; Phil Tan; Ryan Tedder; Spencer Nezey; Stuart Critchon

Stan Walker chronology
Introducing Stan Walker (2009)	From the Inside Out (2010)	Let the Music Play (2011)

Singles from From the Inside Out
- 1. "Unbroken" Released: 12 April 2010; 2. "Choose You" Released: 20 July 2010; 3. "Homesick" Released: 29 October 2010

From the Inside Out is the second studio album by Australian-New Zealand recording artist Stan Walker, released on 20 August 2010 through Sony Music Australia. Walker worked with several record producers and songwriters for the album, including Audius Mtawarira, Israel Cruz, Ryan Tedder, Phil Tan and Stuart Crichton, among others. Musically, the album incorporates synthpop, rock, soul and R&B genres.

Upon its release, the album received positive reviews from music critics. From the Inside Out debuted at number one on the New Zealand Albums Chart and was certified platinum by the Recording Industry Association of New Zealand (RIANZ). It also debuted at number two on the Australian ARIA Albums Chart. Preceding the album's release, lead single "Unbroken" was released digitally on 12 April 2010. The song reached the top-ten of the New Zealand Singles Chart and was certified gold by the RIANZ. "Choose You" was released on 20 July 2010 as the album's second single and peaked at number three on the New Zealand Singles Chart and was certified platinum. It also appeared on the ARIA Singles Chart at number 16 and was certified platinum by the Australian Recording Industry Association (ARIA). The third single, "Homesick", featuring rapper Kayo, was released on 29 October 2010. Walker's first headlining tour in New Zealand, to support the album, ran from mid February to early March 2011.

== Background and development ==
On 1 July 2010, Walker announced the album's title and release date in an exclusive video message to his fans via Facebook, YouTube and his official website. Later that month, Walker's record label began uploading snippets of several of the album's songs onto YouTube. Ahead of the album's release, MusicFix gave fans an exclusive first listen to the album before it was officially released.

In an interview with New Zealand's One News, Walker explained that the album reflects him and his personality, including his Māori roots. In describing the album, he said:

I guess I just wanted this album to be a lot about me and all the different styles of music that I like – not just one sort of style or genre. I really want to be able to tell real stories through my music, rather than talking about stuff that doesn't really matter which is what a lot of people seem to end up doing these days. I don't want it to be just glossy and disposable; I want my songs to deal with real issues.

== Composition ==
From the Inside Out combines the genres of pop, rock, hip hop, soul and R&B. Lead single "Unbroken" has been described as a "chest-beating and uplifting" single, while the second single, "Choose You" has been appreciated for its "soaring pop and grand stomp". According to Cameron Adams from The Daily Telegraph, "Inside Out" "borrows Usher's electro thunderclaps and robo-R&B". "All I Need" makes use of Auto-Tune and has been compared to will.i.am. According to Scott Kara of The New Zealand Herald, "Homesick" is "lush, pure pop" and "One Thing" is influenced by R&B and hip hop. "The One", featuring Pixie Lott, has been called "a dramatic ballad", and "Love Graffiti" has been compared to The Beatles. Most of the songs' lyrics explore the theme of love. Walker stated, "I wanted to make an album of songs, with real lyrics about how we all feel sometimes. There's a lot of manufactured songs with nasty lyrics, but I wanted to talk about real love, real situations that people could really connect to." He named "Love Graffiti" as his favourite track for that reason, valuing the positive way it portrays love.

== Release and promotion ==
From the Inside Out was released in Australia on 20 August 2010 through Sony Music Australia, as both digital download and CD formats. A New Zealand release followed on 23 August. A bonus track was added to the album's digital release: a remix of "Choose You". During the album's first week of release, Walker toured shopping malls in Sydney and Melbourne, performing several of the album's songs and signing CDs. The album was also promoted by Walker through a live televised performance of "Choose You" on Sunrise on 25 August 2010. On 26 August 2010, Walker held an instore appearance at the Sylvia Park shopping centre in Auckland, New Zealand.

=== Tour ===
New Zealand Summer Tour
- Concert by Stan Walker
- A promotional poster for the tour
- Location: New Zealand
- Associated album: From the Inside Out
- Start date: 17 February 2011
- End date: 5 March 2011
- No. of shows: 14

Stan Walker concert chronology
- New Zealand Summer Tour (2011); World Tour of New Zealand (2013)

Walker commenced his first headlining tour in New Zealand in mid February 2011, and ended in early March. Concerts were announced in December 2010 for Wellington, Palmerston North, New Plymouth, Hamilton, Hastings, Tauranga, Auckland, Rotorua and Christchurch. Due to an overwhelming demand, the tour extended to include new shows in Dunedin, Invercargill, Timaru, Oamaru and Ōpōtiki. New Zealand R&B and soul singer Erakah served as the opening act on all dates of the tour. A New Zealand Tour Edition reissue of From the Inside Out was released on 28 January 2011.

Date	City	Venue
17 February 2011	Wellington	Opera House
18 February 2011	Palmerston North	Regent on Broadway
19 February 2011	New Plymouth	TSB Showplace
20 February 2011	Hamilton	Founders Theatre
21 February 2011	Ōpōtiki	Deluxe Theatre
23 February 2011	Hastings	Opera House
24 February 2011	Tauranga	Holy Trinity
25 February 2011	Auckland	Auckland Town Hall
26 February 2011	Rotorua	Unison
28 February 2011	Christchurch	Town Hall
1 March 2011	Oamaru	Opera House
3 March 2011	Invercargill	Civic Theatre
4 March 2011	Dunedin	Town Hall
5 March 2011	Timaru	Theatre Royal

== Singles ==
"Unbroken" was released as the album's lead single on 12 April 2010. The song was written and produced by OneRepublic frontman Ryan Tedder. It peaked at number nine on the New Zealand Singles Chart, and number 23 on the Australian ARIA Singles Chart. "Unbroken" was certified gold by the Recording Industry Association of New Zealand (RIANZ), and by the Australian Recording Industry Association (ARIA). "Choose You" was released as the album's second single on 20 July 2010. The song peaked at number three in New Zealand and was certified platinum. It also reached number 16 in Australia and was certified platinum by the ARIA. "Homesick", featuring rapper Kayo, was released as the album's third and final single on 29 October 2010. The song failed to impact the charts in Australia, however it managed to reach number 21 in New Zealand and was certified gold by the RIANZ.

== Reception ==
Scott Kara from The New Zealand Herald awarded the album four out of five stars and wrote that, "It's all wholesome, family-friendly stuff, and when Walker sings about love it's from the heart". Drew Taylor from Warcry wrote that, "Stan's voice has never sounded better, and the combination of faith and flavour is force to be reckoned with." Allmusic's Jon O'Brien rated From the Inside Out three stars out of five.

From the Inside Out debuted at number one on the New Zealand Albums Chart, and became Walker's first number one album in the country. It was eventually certified platinum by the Recording Industry Association of New Zealand (RIANZ), for selling 15,000 copies. The album remained on the chart for forty non-consecutive weeks. In Australia, the album debuted at number two on the ARIA Albums Chart.

== Track listing ==
No.	Title	Writer(s)	Producer(s)	Length
1.	"Inside Out"	Audius Mtawarira; Leon Seenandan; Stan Walker	Audius Mtawarira; Leon Seenandan	4:01
2.	"All I Need"	Israel Cruz; Walker	Israel Cruz	3:22
3.	"Unbroken"	Ryan Tedder	Ryan Tedder	4:33
4.	"Homesick"	Latesha Marrow; Fridolin Nordsoe; Frederick Nordstorm; Edwin Serrano	Stuart Critchon	3:28
5.	"With Me"	Audius Mtawarira; Jade Seenandan; Leon Seenandan; Walker	Audius Mtawarira; Leon Seenandan; Jade Seenandan	3:50
6.	"Choose You"	Stuart Critchon; Cassie Davis; Carl Dimataga	Stuart Critchon; Cassie Davis; Phil Tan	3:37
7.	"One Thing"	Israel Cruz; Walker	Israel Cruz	3:40
8.	"Love Graffiti"	Spencer Nezey; Greg Ogan; Solomon Ridge	Greg Ogan; Spencer Nezey	3:22
9.	"Chandelier"	Latesha Marrow; Fridolin Nordsoe; Frederick Nordstorm; Edwin Serrano	Frederik Tao; Fridolin Nordsoe; Audius Mtawarira; Leon Seenandan	4:18
10.	"The One" (featuring Pixie Lott)	Stuart Crichton; Tommy Lee James; Pixie Lott; Karen Poole	Stuart Crichton	3:20
11.	"Stand Up"	Pierre Eiras; Jens Koerkemeier	Audius Mtawarira; Leon Seenandan	3:36
12.	"Kissing You"	Des'ree; Timothy Atack	Audius Mtawarira; Leon Seenandan	4:41
13.	"Stuck in a Box" (with Young Sid)	Emile Haynie; Sidney Diamond; T. Tautogia; S. Mullins	Emile	3:41

iTunes bonus track
No.	Title	Length
14.	"Choose You" (GuitarBoy Mix)	3:22

New Zealand Tour Edition bonus tracks
No.	Title	Length
14.	"Homesick" (single version)	3:44
15.	"Choose You" (Israel remix)	3:50
16.	"Unbroken" (Israel remix)	3:46
17.	"Black Box" (acoustic)	3:30

Notes

- Track 12, "Kissing You", is a cover of the 1997 single by Des'ree.
- Track 13, "Stuck in a Box", originally featured on Young Sid's album, What Doesn't Kill Me... (2010).

== Personnel ==
Credits for From the Inside Out adapted from Allmusic.

- Craig Bauer – mixing
- Jeff Breakey – assistant mixing
- Marcus Byrne – assistant mixing
- Andrew Cameron – business affairs
- David Champion – management
- Tom Coyne – mastering
- Pete Craigie – mixing
- Stuart Crichton – keyboards, production, programming, string arrangements, vocal production
- Israel Cruz – production
- Cassie Davis – keyboards, production
- Carl Dimataga – guitar
- Pat Handlin – A&R
- Jason Ierace – photography
- Tommy Lee James – piano
- Damien Lewis assistant mixing
- Vlado Meller – mastering
- Audius Mtawarira – mixing, production, vocal production
- Spencer Nezey – production
- Fridolin Nordsoe – additional production
- Greg Organ – production
- Sally Piper – A&R administration
- Mark Santangelo – assistant mastering
- Jade Seenandan – production
- Leon Seenandan – mixing, production, vocal production
- Jay Dee Springbett – A&R
- Phil Tan – additional production, mixing
- Frederik Tao – additional production
- Ryan Tedder – arrangement, drum programming, engineering, piano, production, programming, background vocals
- Stan Walker – vocals
- Erin Zerner – A&R administration

== Charts and certification ==
=== Weekly charts ===
Chart (2010)	Peak position	Certification
ARIA Albums Chart	2	
New Zealand Albums Chart	1	Platinum

=== Year-end charts ===
Chart (2010)	Position
Australian Artist Albums Chart	37
New Zealand Albums Chart	18
Chart (2011)	Position
New Zealand Artists Albums Chart	9

== Release history ==
Region	Date	Format	Label	Catalogue
Australia	20 August 2010	CD, digital download	Sony Music Australia	88697702822
New Zealand	23 August 2010	CD, digital download	Sony Music Australia	88697702822
New Zealand	28 January 2011	New Zealand Tour Edition	Sony Music Australia	

== See also ==
- List of number-one albums in 2010 (New Zealand)
