= Get 'Em Girls (song) =

Single by Jessica Mauboy featuring Snoop Dogg

from the album Get 'Em Girls
- Released: 17 September 2010
- Genre: R&B; pop; hip hop
- Length: 3:56
- Label: Sony
- Songwriters: David Buchanan; Bangladesh; Snoop Dogg
- Producer: Bangladesh

Jessica Mauboy singles chronology
"Everyone" (2010)	"Get 'Em Girls" (2010)	"Saturday Night" (2010)

Snoop Dogg singles chronology
"It's in the Mornin'" (2010)	"Get 'Em Girls" (2010)	"Mr. Romeo" (2010)

Music video
- "Get 'Em Girls" on YouTube

"Get 'Em Girls" is a song by Australian R&B recording artist Jessica Mauboy. The song features American rapper Snoop Dogg, who co-wrote the song with David Buchanan and producer Bangladesh for her second studio album of the same name. It was released as the album's lead single on 17 September 2010. The concept of the song is about shoes and showcases a more urban, hip hop flavoured sound than Mauboy's previous singles. "Get 'Em Girls" received negative reviews from critics, and peaked at number 19 on the ARIA Singles Chart. An accompanying music video was directed by Hype Williams and received a mixed reaction from fans.

== Background ==
In August 2010, The Music Network reported that "Get 'Em Girls" would be the first single from Mauboy's second studio album to be released on 24 September 2010 and that it would feature "a high-profile US star." On 6 September 2010, a spokesperson for Mauboy's record label, Sony Music Australia, confirmed that the featured artist on the song would be Snoop Dogg. "Get 'Em Girls" was written by David Buchanan, Dogg and Bangladesh, who also handled the song's production.

Mauboy had initially planned to have Nicki Minaj, Missy Elliott or Lady Sovereign featured on the song. She explained, "I didn't end up getting any of them but with the help of Bangladesh who produced the track, he contacted Snoop Dogg and that's how it came about." When speaking about the song in an interview with Q News, Mauboy said, "I really love that track and as soon as it was completed I knew that I wanted it to be the first single. I had to fight the record company a bit to get them to release that song first." "Get 'Em Girls" is an R&B, pop, and "thumping hip hop" song. According to Alasdair Duncan from Rave magazine, the song is "slick-sounding, bump-and-grinding urban pop, drawing on Beyoncé and Rihanna in equal parts."

== Release and reception ==
"Get 'Em Girls" was released digitally and sent to Australian contemporary hit radio on 17 September 2010. Majhid Heath from ABC Online Indigenous called the song an "over-produced train wreck" and wrote that "'Get 'Em Girls' is supposed to be an audacious nod to female empowerment but is nothing more than a shout out to contemptible consumerism." Daile Pepper from Sydney Morning Herald picked "Get 'Em Girls" as one of the worst songs of 2010. Sunshine Coast Daily's Owen Jacques mentioned the song as one of the many few that have been riddled with subtle nuance and silly words, writing that Mauboy "is flanked by a particularly sleazy looking Snoop Dogg, and she pushes the boundary so hard that the fence collapses beneath her." "Get 'Em Girls" debuted and peaked at number 19 on the ARIA Singles Chart and spent six consecutive weeks in the ARIA top 50.

== Music video ==
The music video for the song was directed by Hype Williams and was filmed in Los Angeles, California in September 2010. The video premiered online in October 2010.

The video starts off showing a mini screen of Mauboy and producer Bangladesh twirling around in a purple backdrop, then afterwards shows a scene of flames. The next scene shows Mauboy dancing alongside Snoop Dogg. Other scenes show Mauboy in a white dress strutting the catwalk with her friends, showing off their heels in an array of fashions. They later appear in a shoe shop, where Mauboy and her friends are seen buying shoes, while Dogg plays the role of a shoe salesman.

Since released, the video has been heavily criticised by fans on YouTube. Within only five days of being posted online, there were over three hundred comments with several of them calling the video cheap, tacky, disappointing and left them confused. Some of the comments mentioning the scenes of Mauboy dancing alongside Dogg have been described as "hypersexual" and "sleazy".

== Live performances ==
Mauboy performed "Get 'Em Girls" at the 2010 NRL Grand Final on 3 October 2010, followed by a performance of the song at the 2010 Nickelodeon Australian Kids' Choice Awards on 8 October. On 4 December 2010, she participated in the YouTube Live Sessions program on 4 December 2010 and performed several of the album's songs, including "Get 'Em Girls". On 10 December 2010, Mauboy performed the song at Federation Square in Melbourne, ahead of Oprah Winfrey's visit to the place.

== Track listing ==
- Digital download
1. "Get 'Em Girls" (featuring Snoop Dogg) – 3:56

== Personnel ==
- Songwriting – David Buchanan, Shondrae Crawford, Cordozar Calvin Broadus
- Production – Bangladesh
- Mixing – Fabian Marasciullo
- Mastering – Dave Kutch
- Assistant engineering – Victor Wainstein

== Charts ==
=== Weekly chart ===
Chart (2010)	Peak position
Australia (ARIA)	19

=== Year-end chart ===
Chart (2010)	Position
Australian Artists (ARIA)	41

== Release history ==
Country	Date	Format	Label
Australia	17 September 2010	Contemporary hit radio, digital download	Sony Music Australia
