= Australian Idol season 7 =

Season of television series

Australian Idol
- Season 7
- Hosted by: Andrew G Ricki-Lee Coulter
- Judges: Ian Dickson; Marcia Hines; Jay Dee Springbett; Semi-finals onwards Kyle Sandilands; Auditions Only
- Winner: Stan Walker
- Runner-up: Hayley Warner
- Finals venue: Fox Studios, Sydney; Sydney Opera House (Grand Final)

Release
- Original network: Network Ten
- Original release: 9 August – 22 November 2009

Season chronology
- ← Previous; Season 6 Next → Season 8

- Australian Idol (season 7)
- Finalists (with dates of elimination)
Stan Walker	Winner
Hayley Warner	Runner-up
James Johnston	15 November
Nathan Brake	8 November
Toby Moulton	1 November
Kate Cook	25 October
Kim Cooper	18 October
Scott Newnham	11 October
Tim Johnston	4 October
Sabrina Batshon	27 September
Casey Barnes	20 September
Ashleigh Toole	13 September

The seventh season of Australian Idol began on 9 August 2009, to determine who would succeed season 6 winner, Wes Carr. Beginning amid controversy, judge Kyle Sandilands was replaced by Sony Music record executive, Jay Dee Springbett. It was the only season where the top four contestants were eighteen years old or younger. Stan Walker was declared the winner on 22 November 2009.

== Overview ==
=== Format changes ===
Ian Dickson, and Marcia Hines returned as judges; however, long-term judge Kyle Sandilands was sacked after causing controversy on his radio show prior to the premiere, although he was still present for the auditions as they had been pre-recorded some weeks earlier. On 23 August 2009, it was announced on the Idol show that the new judge taking over Kyle Sandilands' spot would be Jay Dee Springbett. Andrew G returned as host, with assistance from Ricki-Lee Coulter due to the departure of James Mathison. The first auditions saw guest judge Brian McFadden join the panel, and his then fiancée Delta Goodrem acted as a guest judge for the Sydney auditions.

A further change was also decided for the Top 12 round eliminations. The Monday-night elimination show was axed in favour of a two-hour 'super Sunday' elimination/ performance show, in which a contestant was eliminated according to votes tallied the previous week, followed by performances.

== Auditions ==
The auditions were held at the following locations:

Town/City	State	Arena/Area	Date
Darwin	Northern Territory	Crowne Plaza	22 March
Cairns	Queensland	Shangri-La Hotel	24 March
Mackay	Queensland	CQ University, Conservatorium of Music	26 March
Tamworth	New South Wales	Tamworth Regional Entertainment Centre	29 March
Bathurst	New South Wales	Bathurst Memorial Entertainment Centre	1 April
Newcastle	New South Wales	Newcastle Jockey Club	5 April
Perth	Western Australia	Perth Convention & Exhibition Centre	19 April
Hobart	Tasmania	Hotel Grand Chancellor	21 April
Adelaide	South Australia	Adelaide Convention Centre	26 April
Albury	New South Wales	Albury Convention Centre	28 April
Melbourne	Victoria	Flemington Racecourse Event Centre	1, 2 & 3 May
Brisbane	Queensland	South Bank Piazza	9 & 10 May
Sydney	New South Wales	Australian Technology Park	16, 17 & 18 May

== Semi-finals ==
These aired on the week of 24 to 27 August, allowing viewers to vote. The "Wildcard" Performance Show followed on Sunday, 30 August, with live results revealed the following week, on 6 September.

Females	Males
Nicole Banks	Casey Barnes
Sabrina Batshon	Darcy Lee
Kate Cook	Nathan Brake
Kim Cooper	Seth Drury
Jamila Ioane	Adam Eckersley
Lucie Johnson	James Johnston
Aliqua Mao	Tim Johnston
Tenielle Muslin	Toby Moulton
Lauren Street	Scott Newnham
Ashleigh Toole	Daniel Raso
Marijana Topalovic	Stan Walker
Hayley Warner	Ed Zaidan

=== Group 1 ===
- Hayley Warner – "Cryin' Shame" (Diesel)
- Seth Drury – "You Found Me" (The Fray)
- Jamila Ioane – "For Once in My Life" (Stevie Wonder)
- Toby Moulton – "Yellow" (Coldplay)
- Kate Cook – "Your Mama Don't Dance" (Loggins and Messina)
- Stan Walker – "If I Ain't Got You" (Alicia Keys)

Advancing to the Top 12: Stan Walker & Kate Cook
Wild Card Contenders: Hayley Warner & Toby Moulton

=== Group 2 ===
- Ashleigh Toole – "Hurt" (Christina Aguilera)
- Adam Eckersley – "All Fired Up" (Pat Benatar)
- Marijana Topalovic – "It Must Have Been Love" (Roxette)
- Lauren Street – "You Oughta Know" (Alanis Morissette)
- Casey Barnes – "Her Diamonds" (Rob Thomas)
- Nathan Brake – "Don't Let the Sun Go Down on Me" (Elton John)

Advancing to the Top 12: Ashleigh Toole & Nathan Brake
Wild Card Contenders: Lauren Street & Casey Barnes

=== Group 3 ===
- Daniel Raso – "You to Me Are Everything" (The Real Thing)
- Aliqua Mao – "I Will Always Love You" (Whitney Houston)
- Nicole Banks – "Viva la Vida" (Coldplay)
- Jason Bartlett – "Tears in Heaven" (Eric Clapton)
- Scott Newnham – "Run It!" (Chris Brown)
- Sabrina Batshon – "Hush Hush" (Pussycat Dolls)

Advancing to the Top 12: Sabrina Batshon & Scott Newnham
Wild Card Contender: Aliqua Mao

=== Group 4 ===
- Kim Cooper – "Waking Up in Vegas" (Katy Perry)
- Ed Zaidan – "Foreign Land" (Eskimo Joe)
- Lucie Johnson – "Sweet Dreams" (Beyoncé Knowles)
- Tim Johnston – "Signed, Sealed, Delivered (I'm Yours)" (Stevie Wonder)
- Tenielle Muslin – "Love Story" (Taylor Swift)
- James Johnston – "Crazy" (Gnarls Barkley)

Advancing to the Top 12: James Johnston & Kim Cooper
Wild Card Contenders: Ed Zaidan, Lucie Johnson, Tim Johnston & Tenielle Muslin

=== Wildcard ===
- Lucie Johnson – "Boogie Wonderland" (Earth, Wind and Fire)
- Casey Barnes – "Never Say Never (Don't Let Me Go)" (The Fray)
- Aliqua Mao – "The Power of Love" (Celine Dion)
- Lauren Street – "Low" (Kelly Clarkson)
- Tim Johnston – "Yesterday" (The Beatles)
- Ed Zaidan – "White Noise" (The Living End)
- Tenielle Muslin – "Kiss Me" (Sixpence None the Richer)
- Toby Moulton – "With or Without You" (U2)
- Hayley Warner – "I Do Not Hook Up" (Kelly Clarkson)

Advancing to the Top 12 through the Public vote: Toby Moulton and Hayley Warner
Advancing to the Top 12 through the Judges picks: Casey Barnes and Tim Johnston

== Weekly Song Themes ==
Date	Week	Theme	Mentor/Guest Judge
6 September	Top 12	Contestant's Choice	none
13 September	Top 11	Rock Night	Suzi Quatro
20 September	Top 10	Top 10 Hits	Brian McFadden
27 September	Top 9	1980s	Ross Wilson
4 October	Top 8	P!nk Song Hits	none
11 October	Top 7	Big Band	James Morrison / Harry Connick, Jr.
18 October	Top 6	Movie / Theatre Night	Liza Minnelli
25 October	Top 5	Contestant's Choice	none
1 November	Top 4	Noughties Week	Joel and Benji Madden
8 November	Top 3	Power Anthems	Pete Wentz (Guest Judge)
15 November	Top 2	Contestant's Choice and Winner's Single	Michael Bublé

== Group/Guest Performances ==
Week	Performer(s)	Title
Top 12	none	N/A
Top 11	Suzi Quatro	Devil Gate Drive
Top 10	Top 11	Don't Stop Believin'
Top 9	Top 10	Girls on Film
Top 8	Top 9	Get the Party Started
Top 7	Top 8	(If I Could) Whisper Your Name
Top 7	Harry Connick, Jr.	The Way You Look Tonight
Top 6	Liza Minnelli	Cabaret
Top 5	Top 6	Before the Worst
Top 4	Joel and Benji Madden	Dance Floor Anthem (I Don't Want to Be in Love)
Top 3	Top 4	We Built This City
Top 2	Top 3	Medley – Purple Rain, Crazy & Somebody Told Me

== The Top 12 Finalists ==
=== Stan Walker ===
Stan Walker was born in October 1990. Although residing in Australia for the past three and a half years, Stan grew up in Hamilton and Tauranga, New Zealand. He works in retail. He has the Māori word ataahua (meaning "beautiful") tattooed on his neck.

Audition: "Ordinary People" (John Legend)
Theatre Week (Round 1): "Jesus Loves Me"
Theatre Week (Round 2): "Use Somebody" (Kings of Leon)
Theatre Week (Round 3): "Let's Stay Together" (Al Green)
Top 24: "If I Ain't Got You" (Alicia Keys)
Top 12: "Umbrella" (Rihanna)
Top 11: "Nothing Else Matters" (Metallica)
Top 10: "Straight Lines" (Silverchair)
Top 9: "Purple Rain" (Prince and The Revolution)
Top 8: "Dear Mr. President" (P!nk)
Top 7: "Single Ladies (Put a Ring on It)" (Beyoncé)
Top 6: "Circle of Life" (Elton John)
Top 6: "We Will Rock You" (Queen)
Top 5: "Hallelujah" (Leonard Cohen)
Top 5: "Ain't No Mountain High Enough" (Marvin Gaye and Tammi Terrell)
Top 4: "The Climb" (Miley Cyrus)
Top 4: "Let Me Love You" (Mario)
Top 3: "Amazing Grace (My Chains Are Gone)" (Chris Tomlin)
Top 3: "It's a Man's Man's Man's World" (James Brown)
Top 3: "Eye of the Tiger" (Survivor)
Top 2: "How Can You Mend a Broken Heart" (Bee Gees)
Top 2: "Superstar" (Luther Vandross)
Top 2: "Sweet Dreams" (Beyoncé)
Top 2: "Black Box" (Winner's Single) – Winner

=== Hayley Warner ===
Hayley Warner was born on 23 January 1992 in Sydney. She was the lead singer of her band, Bleached Academy and worked in retail at a surf shop. She was also related to a young and upcoming New South Wales cricket player David Warner.

Audition: "Daughters" (John Mayer)
Theatre Week (Round 1): N/A
Theatre Week (Round 2): "Human" (The Killers)
Theatre Week (Round 3): "Sober" (P!nk)
Top 24: "Cryin' Shame" (Diesel)
Wildcard: "I Do Not Hook Up" (Kelly Clarkson)
Top 12: "Light Surrounding You" (Evermore)
Top 11: "Misery Business" (Paramore)
Top 10: "Leave (Get Out)" (JoJo)
Top 9: "Dancing in the Dark" (Bruce Springsteen)
Top 8: "Funhouse" (Pink)
Top 7: "Tainted Love" (Gloria Jones)
Top 6: "These Days" (Powderfinger)
Top 6: "December, 1963 (Oh, What a Night)" (Frankie Valli)
Top 5: "Somebody Told Me" (The Killers)
Top 5: "Stone Cold Sober" (Paloma Faith)
Top 4: "I Don't Care" (Fall Out Boy)
Top 4: "Heavy Cross" (Gossip)
Top 3: "Bitter Sweet Symphony" (The Verve)
Top 3: "New Sensation" (INXS)
Top 3: "One" (U2)
Top 2: "For Once in My Life" (Stevie Wonder)
Top 2: "UFO" (Sneaky Sound System)
Top 2: "Don't Stop the Music" (Rihanna)
Top 2: "Good Day" (Winner's Single) – Runner up

=== James Johnston ===
James Johnston was born on 26 November 1990 in Wingham, New South Wales. He was a part of Starstruck in 2005, performing in front of thousands. He prefers the acoustic/rock style of music.

Audition: "Your Body Is a Wonderland" by John Mayer
Theatre Week (Round 1): "You'll Never Walk Alone" from the show Carousel
Theatre Week (Round 2): N/A
Theatre Week (Round 3): "No Such Thing" John Mayer
Top 24: "Crazy" Gnarls Barkley
Top 12: "How to Save a Life" The Fray
Top 11: "Thnks Fr Th Mmrs" Fall Out Boy
Top 10: "Drops of Jupiter (Tell Me)" Train
Top 9: "The Power of Love" Huey Lewis and the News
Top 8: "Who Knew" P!nk
Top 7: "Fever" Peggy Lee
Top 6: "Crazy Little Thing Called Love" Queen
Top 6: "You'll Never Walk Alone" (from the show Carousel)
Top 5: "Mercy" (Duffy)
Top 5: "Use Somebody" (Kings of Leon)
Top 4: "Daughters" By John Mayer
Top 4: "This Is How a Heart Breaks" (Rob Thomas)
Top 3: "More Than Words" (Extreme)
Top 3: "Hold the Line" (Toto)
Top 3: "Learn to Fly" (Foo Fighters) – Eliminated on 15 November

=== Nathan Brake ===
Nathan Brake was born on 27 July 1991 in Guildford, Sydney. He was a student at the Australian International Performing Arts High School. He is the lead singer of his band, Ackolade. Nathan has since performed at a number of events including the 2009 Melbourne Christmas carols with Ricki Lee Coulter.

Nathan Brake has an unofficial fan site Nathan Nation where upcoming events are mentioned and contains a forum for fans.

Audition: "Bohemian Rhapsody" (Queen)
Theatre Week (Round 1): "Papa Was a Rollin' Stone" (The Temptations)
Theatre Week (Round 2): "To the Moon and Back"(Savage Garden)
Theatre Week (Round 3): "We Are the Champions" (Queen)
Top 24: "Don't Let the Sun Go Down on Me" (Elton John)
Top 12: "Stop and Stare" (OneRepublic)
Top 11: "Second Chance" (Shinedown)
Top 10: "Since U Been Gone" (Kelly Clarkson)
Top 9: "Livin' on a Prayer" (Bon Jovi)
Top 8: "Just Like a Pill" (P!nk)
Top 7: "It Don't Mean a Thing (If It Ain't Got That Swing)" (Duke Ellington)
Top 6: "Thriller" (Michael Jackson)
Top 6: "The Music of the Night" (from the show The Phantom of the Opera)
Top 5: "Makes Me Wonder" (Maroon 5)
Top 5: "Mad World" (Michael Andrews and Gary Jules)
Top 4: "Red" (Daniel Merriweather)
Top 4: "Closer" (Ne-Yo) – Eliminated on 8 November

=== Toby Moulton ===
Toby Moulton was born in 1979 and worked as a primary school teacher, born in Melrose, South Australia. He teaches at St Joseph’s School Tranmere, South Australia.

Audition: "Exit Music" by Radiohead
Theatre Week (Round 1): N/A
Theatre Week (Round 2): N/A
Theatre Week (Round 3): "Open Your Eyes" by Snow Patrol
Top 24: "Yellow" by Coldplay
Wildcard: "With or Without You" by U2
Top 12: "Creep" by Radiohead
Top 11: "Starlight" by Muse
Top 10: "Take On Me" by a-ha
Top 9: "I Want to Know What Love Is" by Foreigner
Top 8: "Please Don't Leave Me" by P!nk
Top 7: "My Way" by Frank Sinatra
Top 6: "Exit Music" by Radiohead
Top 6: "Somebody to Love" by Queen
Top 5: "Don't Look Back in Anger" by Oasis
Top 5: "Politik" by Coldplay – Withdrew on November, 1

=== Kate Cook ===
Kate Cook was born in 1983 and came from Lowood, Queensland. She worked as a meat cutter at an abattoir. Her mother, who was her biggest musical influence, died by suicide when Kate was 16. Cook wrote her first single release about her mother, "Make You Stay" (released independently and available to Australian radio in April 2010). She died on 3 March 2019.

Audition: "Make You Stay" (own composition)
Theatre Week (Round 1): N/A
Theatre Week (Round 2): N/A
Theatre Week (Round 3): "Hard Workin' Man" by Brooks & Dunn
Top 24: "Your Mama Don't Dance" by Loggins and Messina
Top 12: "Stuck in the Middle" by Stealers Wheel
Top 11: "Are You Gonna Be My Girl" by Jet
Top 10: "Landslide" by Fleetwood Mac
Top 9: "When the Going Gets Tough, the Tough Get Going" by Billy Ocean
Top 8: "Trouble" by P!nk
Top 7: "Hit the Road Jack" by Ray Charles
Top 6: "Make You Feel My Love" by Garth Brooks
Top 6: "Son of a Preacher Man" by Dusty Springfield – Eliminated on 25 October

=== Kim Cooper ===
Kim Cooper was born on 29 November 1987 in Melbourne. At age 17, she moved to Townsville, Queensland, after her father was diagnosed with Bipolar disorder. She works in fashion retail.

Audition: "Like It Loud" by Cassie Davis
Theatre Week (Round 1): "Sorry" by Maria Mena
Theatre Week (Round 2): "Sex on Fire" by Kings of Leon
Theatre Week (Round 3): "Before He Cheats" by Carrie Underwood
Top 24: "Waking Up in Vegas" by Katy Perry
Top 12: "Best of You" by Foo Fighters
Top 11: "I Want You To Want Me" by Cheap Trick
Top 10: "Just Dance" by Lady Gaga
Top 9: "You Keep Me Hangin' On" by Kim Wilde
Top 8: "Family Portrait" by P!nk
Top 7: "The Man I Love" by Ella Fitzgerald – Eliminated on 18 October

=== Scott Newnham ===
Scott Newnham was born in 1989 and comes from Melbourne. He works as a bricklayer, and before Idol, had never sung in front of another person except his best friend.

Audition: "You Give Me Something" by James Morrison
Theatre Week (Round 1): "Elevator Love" by Guy Sebastian
Theatre Week (Round 2): "Rock with You" by Michael Jackson
Theatre Week (Round 3): "Isn't She Lovely" by Stevie Wonder
Top 24: "Run It!" by Chris Brown
Top 12: "Come Together" by The Beatles
Top 11: "American Woman" by The Guess Who
Top 10: "Kiss from a Rose" by Seal
Top 9: "Let's Groove" by Earth, Wind & Fire
Top 8: "So What" by P!nk – Eliminated on 11 October

=== Tim Johnston ===
Tim Johnston was born in 1981 and comes from Newcastle, New South Wales. He auditioned for The X Factor, the fifth edition, while living in the United Kingdom. He advanced to the bootcamp round, but failed to make the cut for the Visit to the Judges' houses. He works as a barista.

Audition: "I Heard It Through the Grapevine" by Marvin Gaye
Theatre Week (Round 1): "Angels" by Robbie Williams
Theatre Week (Round 2): N/A
Theatre Week (Round 3): N/A
Top 24: "Signed, Sealed, Delivered (I'm Yours)" by Stevie Wonder
Wildcard: "Yesterday" by The Beatles
Top 12: "Halo" by Beyoncé
Top 11: "Jumpin' Jack Flash" by The Rolling Stones
Top 10: "What Goes Around.../...Comes Around" by Justin Timberlake
Top 9: "Heaven" by Bryan Adams – Eliminated on 4 October

=== Sabrina Batshon ===
Batshon performing Michael Jackson's Earth Song for Australian Idol Season 7

Sabrina Batshon (born 26 October 1984) is an Australian-born singer, songwriter and actor from Rhodes, Sydney. She began singing and dancing at the age of two at the Johnny Young Talent School. She had roles on Australian television including Water Rats, G.P. and Home and Away. She won several talent quests including the McDonald's Performing Arts Challenge. In 2000, she sang with The Australian Girls Choir and Paulini for the Qantas campaign CD, The Spirit of Australia. She was understudy to Nikki Webster as Dorothy in a 2000/2001 stage performance of The Wizard of Oz and was cast as the 'Little Girl' in the 2001 production of The Witches of Eastwick (musical) in Melbourne. She attended the Newtown High School of the Performing Arts and was named in November 2004 in Parliament by Andrew Refshauge as being one of Australia's best singers. During 2005 and early 2009 Batshon experienced chronic depression, agoraphobia and panic attacks, and was admitted to hospital. Producer Stephen Tate said speaking "openly and honestly" about depression was the way forward for the media and community.

Audition: "Nature Boy" by Nat King Cole
Theatre Week (Round 1): "Black Velvet" by Alannah Myles
Theatre Week (Round 2): "When I Fall in Love" by Nat King Cole
Theatre Week (Round 3): "Help" by The Beatles
Top 24: "Hush Hush" by The Pussycat Dolls
Top 12: "Earth Song" by Michael Jackson
Top 11: "Numb" by Linkin Park
Top 10: "When Love Takes Over" by David Guetta – Eliminated on 27 September

=== Casey Barnes ===
Casey Barnes was born on 3 September 1978 in Tasmania. At a young age he became blind in his right eye after an infection. He has opened for Bryan Adams and played alongside Eskimo Joe, Vanessa Amorosi and Diesel during his career.

Audition: "Fire and Rain" by James Taylor
Theatre Week (Round 1): N/A
Theatre Week (Round 2): "Tiny Dancer" by Elton John
Theatre Week (Round 3): N/A
Top 24: "Her Diamonds" by Rob Thomas
Wildcard: "Never Say Never (Don't Let Me Go)" by The Fray
Top 12: "On My Mind" by Powderfinger
Top 11: "I'm Not Over" by Carolina Liar – Eliminated on 20 September

=== Ashleigh Toole ===
Ashleigh Toole was born in 1991 and comes from the Central Coast, New South Wales, and is of both Irish and Lebanese heritage. A student, she grew up performing in multiple music festivals with her family. Ashleigh went on to marry Rams 250 game heart-throb AJ Gray in the vineyards of the Hunter Valley. The two currently reside in Western Sydney living their best lives.

Audition: "Nobody Knows" by Pink
Theatre Week (Round 1): "I Wanna Be Your Everything" by Vanessa Amorosi
Theatre Week (Round 2): "Angels" by Robbie Williams
Theatre Week (Round 3): "River Deep - Mountain High" by Ike & Tina Turner
Top 24: "Hurt" by Christina Aguilera
Top 12: "Miss Independent" by Kelly Clarkson – Eliminated on 13 September

== Grand Final Performances ==
No.	Performer(s)	Title
1	Top 12	Don't Stop Me Now
2	Michael Bublé with Hayley and Stan	Feeling Good
3	Wes Carr and Ian Moss	Beat It
4	Top 12 Girls	When Love Takes Over
5	Mika	Rain & We Are Golden
6	Ricki-Lee Coulter	Hear No, See No, Speak No
7	Top 12 Guys	Take Back the City
8	Guy Sebastian & Jordin Sparks	Art of Love
9	Michael Bublé	Cry Me a River
10	Hayley Warner	Funhouse
11	Stan Walker	It's A Man's, Man's, Man's World
12	Stan Walker	Black Box

== Elimination chart ==
Females	Males	Top 24	Top 12	Wild Card	Winner

Did Not Perform	Safe	Safe First	Safe Last	Eliminated

Stage:		Semi-finals				Wild Card	Finals										
Week:		24/8	25/8	26/8	27/8	30/8	6/9	13/9	20/9	27/9	4/10	11/10	18/10	25/10	1/11	8/11	15/11
Place	Contestant	Result															
1	Stan Walker	Top 12											Bottom 2				Winner
2	Hayley Warner	Wild Card				Top 12						Bottom 2			Bottom 2		Runner-up
3	James Johnston				Top 12					Bottom 3	Bottom 2		Bottom 3	Elim		Elim	
4	Nathan Brake		Top 12						Bottom 3		Bottom 3				Elim		
5	Toby Moulton	Wild Card				Top 12								WD			
6	Kate Cook	Top 12										Bottom 3	Elim				
7	Kim Cooper				Top 12			Bottom 3	Bottom 2			Elim					
8	Scott Newnham			Top 12						Bottom 2	Elim						
9	Tim Johnston				Wild Card	Top 12	Bottom 3			Elim							
10	Sabrina Batshon			Top 12				Bottom 2	Elim								
11	Casey Barnes		Wild Card			Top 12	Bottom 2	Elim									
12	Ashleigh Toole		Top 12				Elim										
Wild Card	Lucie Johnson				Wild Card	Elim											
Wild Card	Aliqua Mao			Wild Card		Elim											
Wild Card	Tenielle Muslin				Wild Card	Elim											
Wild Card	Lauren Street		Wild Card			Elim											
Wild Card	Ed Zaidan				Wild Card	Elim											
Semi-final 3	Nicole Banks			Elim													
Semi-final 3	Jason Bartlett			Elim													
Semi-final 3	Daniel Raso			Elim													
Semi-final 2	Adam Eckersley		Elim														
Semi-final 2	Marijana Topalovic		Elim														
Semi-final 1	Jamila Ioane	Elim															
Semi-final 1	Seth Drury	Elim															

- All four remaining contestants from Semi-final No. 4 were selected for the Wildcard show
- Toby Moulton withdrew from the competition, keeping original eliminee James Johnston in the competition.

== Ratings ==
The first episode, which featured auditions in both Melbourne and Brisbane, achieved an audience of 1.3m. This was considerably lower than previous first episodes. In 2006, the premiere garnered 1.4m, the 2007 reached 1.65m and 2008 achieved 1.4m. The peak audience, however, of 1.77m was the biggest-seen in years. The show won the night in the 18–49 demographic.

Episode		Airdate	Timeslot	Ratings (Note: Overall national viewers, numbers in brackets indicate nightly ratings position.)	Rank	Ref
1	"Auditions"	9 August 2009	Sunday 6:30 pm–8:30 pm	1.300	5	
2	"Auditions"	16 August 2009	Sunday 6:30 pm–8:30 pm	1.171	8	
3	"Top 100"	23 August 2009	Sunday 6:30 pm–8:30 pm	1.086	8	
4	"Semi-finals"	24 August 2009	Monday 7:30 pm–8:30 pm	1.110	10	
5	"Semi-finals"	25 August 2009	Tuesday 7:30 pm–8:30 pm	1.049	14	
6	"Semi-finals"	26 August 2009	Wednesday 7:30 pm–8:30 pm	1.049	12	
7	"Semi-finals"	27 August 2009	Thursday 7:30 pm–8:30 pm	1.153	5	
8	"Verdict Semi-final 4/Wildcard"	30 August 2009	Sunday 6:30 pm–8:30 pm	0.992	10	
9	"Verdict Wildcard/Final 12"	6 September 2009	Sunday 6:30 pm–8:30 pm	0.883	11	
10	"Live Verdict/Final 11"	13 September 2009	Sunday 6:30 pm–8:30 pm	0.990	12	
11	"Live Verdict/Final 10"	20 September 2009	Sunday 7:30 pm–9:30 pm	0.976	9	
12	"Live Verdict/Final 9"	27 September 2009	Sunday 7:30 pm–9:30 pm	0.984	10	
13	"Live Verdict/Final 8"	4 October 2009	Sunday 7:30 pm–9:30 pm	0.926	11	
14	"Live Verdict/Final 7"	11 October 2009	Sunday 7:30 pm–9:30 pm	0.978	14	
15	"Live Verdict/Final 6"	18 October 2009	Sunday 7:30 pm–9:30 pm	1.064	8	
16	"Live Verdict/Final 5"	25 October 2009	Sunday 7:30 pm–9:30 pm	1.003	9	
17	"Live Verdict/Final 4"	1 November 2009	Sunday 7:30 pm–9:30 pm	0.942	9	
18	"Live Verdict/Final 3"	8 November 2009	Sunday 7:30 pm–9:30 pm	0.890	11	
19	"Live Verdict/Final 2"	15 November 2009	Sunday 7:30 pm–9:30 pm	0.924	10	
20	"Grand Finale" "Winner Announced"	22 November 2009	Sunday 7:30 pm–9:30 pm	1.108 1.471	10 3	

== Notes ==
Preceded by Season 6 (2008)	Australian Idol; Season 7 (2009)	Succeeded by None show axed
