= Introducing Stan Walker =

Studio album by Stan Walker
- Released: 7 December 2009
- Recorded: 2009
- Genres: Pop; R&B; soul
- Length: 33:54
- Label: RCA/Sony

Stan Walker chronology
Introducing Stan Walker (2009)	From the Inside Out (2010)

Singles from Introducing Stan Walker
- 1. "Black Box" Released: 22 November 2009

Introducing Stan Walker is the debut studio album by season seven Australian Idol winner, Stan Walker. It was released through Sony Music Australia via its RCA Records label on 7 December 2009. The album contained the selected songs Walker performed during the top twelve on Australian Idol, as well as the two original songs, "Black Box" and "Think of Me". The album debuted at number two on the New Zealand Albums Chart and was certified triple platinum by the Recording Industry Association of New Zealand (RIANZ). It also appeared on the Australian ARIA Albums Chart at number three and was certified platinum by the Australian Recording Industry Association (ARIA). Preceding the album's release, lead single "Black Box" was released for digital download on 22 November 2009. The song appeared on the singles charts of Australia and New Zealand at numbers two and one, respectively.

== Background ==
The album was recorded in two days after Walker became the winner of the seventh season of Australian Idol. The album featured the selected songs that Walker had performed throughout the season, as well as the two original songs "Black Box" and "Think of Me", which was produced by the first Australian Idol winner, Guy Sebastian. In an interview with Herald Sun, Walker explained that he wanted to put his favourite performance of Beyoncé's "Single Ladies (Put a Ring on It)" on the album but could not. "I couldn't put it on there because I didn't have a big band to do it. It was too much for people to arrange in time ... it was the hardest song I've ever had to do."

== Reception and release ==
Cameron Adams from Herald Sun awarded the album three and a half out of five stars, writing that, "here's your swift introduction to that voice singing classic songs. Now comes the real test – to write or find some of his own". On the New Zealand Albums Chart, Introducing... Stan Walker debuted at number two on 14 December 2009, where it remained for six consecutive weeks. The album was certified triple platinum by the Recording Industry Association of New Zealand (RIANZ), for selling 45,000 copies. In Australia, the album debuted at number three on the ARIA Albums Chart on 21 December 2009. It was certified platinum by the Australian Recording Industry Association (ARIA), for selling 70,000 copies.

=== Singles ===
"Black Box" was released as the album's lead single on 22 November 2009. The song peaked at number one on the New Zealand Singles Chart for ten consecutive weeks. "Black Box" was certified double platinum by Recording Industry Association of New Zealand (RIANZ), for selling 30,000 copies. In Australia, "Black Box" debuted and peaked at number two on the ARIA Singles Chart. It was certified double platinum by the Australian Record Industry Association (ARIA), for selling 140,000 copies.

== Track listing ==
Introducing Stan Walker track listing
No.	Title	Music	Length
1.	"Black Box"	Lucas Secon; Wayne Hector; Jonas Jeberg; Cutfather	3:27
2.	"Purple Rain"	Prince	3:16
3.	"The Climb"	Jessi Alexander; Jon Mabe; John Shanks	3:36
4.	"It's a Man's Man's Man's World"	James Brown; Betty Jean Newsome	2:42
5.	"Think of Me"	Shridhar Solanki; Ali Tennant; Guz Lally	3:41
6.	"Ordinary People"	John Legend; will.i.am	2:57
7.	"Let's Stay Together"	Al Green; Willie Mitchell; Al Jackson Jr.	2:49
8.	"Hallelujah"	Leonard Cohen	2:48
9.	"Superstar"	Leon Russell; Bonnie Bramlett	3:27
10.	"We Will Rock You"	Brian May; Queen; Mike Stone	1:50
11.	"Amazing Grace"	John Newton	3:21
Total length:			33:54

== Charts and certifications ==
=== Weekly charts ===
Chart (2009)	Peak position
ARIA Albums Chart	3
New Zealand Albums Chart	2

=== Year-end charts ===
Chart (2009)	Position
ARIA Albums Chart	58
New Zealand Albums Chart	6
Chart (2010)	Position
Australian Artists Albums Chart	32

=== Certifications ===
Country	Certification
Australia	Platinum
New Zealand	3× Platinum

== Release history ==
Region	Date	Format	Label
Australia	7 December 2009	Digital download	Sony Music Australia
New Zealand	7 December 2009	CD, digital download	Sony Music Australia
Australia	11 December 2009	CD	Sony Music Australia
