= Inescapable (song) =

Single by Jessica Mauboy

from the album Get 'Em Girls (Deluxe Edition)
- Released: 15 July 2011
- Recorded: Los Angeles, California
- Genre: Pop
- Length: 3:35
- Label: Sony
- Songwriter: Diane Warren
- Producers: Youngboyz; Anthony Egizii; David Musumeci

Jessica Mauboy singles chronology
"What Happened to Us" (2011)	"Inescapable" (2011)	"Galaxy" (2011)

Music video
- "Inescapable" on YouTube

"Inescapable" is a song by Australian recording artist Jessica Mauboy. It was written by Diane Warren and produced by Youngboyz, Anthony Egizii and David Musumeci. "Inescapable" was sent to Australian contemporary hit radio on 4 July 2011, and was released for digital download on 15 July 2011 as the first single from the deluxe edition of Mauboy's second studio album Get 'Em Girls. The song's lyrics revolve around "a relationship all gone wrong but also a celebration."

"Inescapable" peaked at number four on the ARIA Singles Chart and became Mauboy's highest-charting single since 2008's "Burn". It was certified double platinum by the Australian Recording Industry Association (ARIA). The accompanying music video was directed by Mark Alston and features scenes of Mauboy on different coloured backdrops and a dedication to Jay Dee Springbett.

== Background and composition ==
"Inescapable" was written by Diane Warren and produced by Youngboyz, Anthony Egizii and David Musumeci. It was one of the songs Warren and Mauboy worked on in Los Angeles for her second studio album Get 'Em Girls (2010). However, the song did not make the final track list on the standard edition of Get 'Em Girls and was later included on the deluxe edition. "Inescapable" is a pop song written in the key of E minor. Mauboy told The Daily Telegraph that it "is just about a relationship all gone wrong but also a celebration." Her manager David Champion said "Inescapable" was a dedication to Sony Music record-label executive Jay Dee Springbett, who was found dead at his Sydney apartment on 30 June 2011. Champion said, "Jess and JD worked very closely together on making 'Inescapable' and she is devastated by his passing... His spirit lives on in the recording."

== Reception ==
Jonathon Moran of The Daily Telegraph praised "Inescapable" for being "catchy, sexy, [and] radio-friendly", while a writer for 97.3 FM called it "an absolute smash." For the week commencing 1 August 2011, "Inescapable" debuted at number 20 on the ARIA Singles Chart and number eight on the ARIA Urban Singles Chart. The song peaked at number four on the ARIA Singles Chart on 15 August 2011, and became Mauboy's fifth top-ten single. On the ARIA Urban Singles Chart, "Inescapable" peaked at number one. It was certified double platinum by the Australian Recording Industry Association (ARIA), for selling over 140,000 copies.

== Music video ==
=== Background ===
The music video was directed by Mark Alston and filmed in Sydney. A behind-the-scenes video of the shoot was posted on The Daily Telegraph website on 3 July 2011. The completed video premiered on Mauboy's Vevo account on 15 July 2011.

=== Synopsis ===
The video opens showing Mauboy on a blue backdrop singing with a gold microphone inside a gold cube without walls. The next scene shows her in front of a gold backdrop wearing a leopard-print dress with black boots; she is standing beside a man who is tied up and sings to him with a megaphone. Another scene shows Mauboy wearing a navy blue jumpsuit in a room full of mirrors. Throughout the video, Mauboy is seen with two male dancers performing choreography on a dark grey backdrop. The video ends with a dedication to Jay Dee Springbett saying, "To Jay, We did it! This is our song. You’re forever in my heart. Love Jess", alongside a picture of the two.

=== Reception ===
A writer for 97.3 FM called the video "vibrant, fun, [and] colourful fantastic" and wrote that it "showcases Jess at her best & is exactly what the Australian public love about our girl." A biographer of Mauboy's for The Celebrity Bureau commented, "Her single 'Inescapable' was written by renowned US songwriter Diane Warren and went on to achieve DOUBLE PLATINUM sales and over 1 million views on YouTube/Vevo."

== Live performances ==
Mauboy performed "Inescapable" live for the first time at the 2011 ASTRA Awards on 21 July 2011. On 2 August 2011, she performed the song on the Australia's Got Talent grand finale, wearing a leopard-print jacket, black dress and black heels. She also performed "Inescapable" on Sunrise on 9 August 2011, wearing a black and white dress with black heels. A live version of "Inescapable" was included on Mauboy's extended play iTunes Session (2014).

== Track listing ==
- Digital download
1. "Inescapable" (Youngboyz Mix) – 3:35
2. "Inescapable" (OFM Mix) – 3:33

== Charts ==
=== Weekly charts ===
Chart (2011)	Peak position
Australia (ARIA)	4
Australia Urban (ARIA)	1

=== Year-end charts ===
Chart (2011)	Rank
Australia (ARIA)	52
Australian Artists (ARIA)	4

== Certifications ==
Region	Certification	Certified units/sales
Australia (ARIA)	2× Platinum	140,000^{^}
^{^} Shipments figures based on certification alone.

== Release history ==
Country	Date	Format	Label
Australia	4 July 2011	Contemporary hit radio	Sony Music Australia
Australia	15 July 2011	Digital download / remix	Sony Music Australia
