= Homesick (Stan Walker song) =

Single by Stan Walker featuring Kayo

from the album From the Inside Out
- Released: 29 October 2010
- Genre: Pop
- Length: 3:45; 3:29 (album version)
- Label: Sony
- Songwriters: Frederick Nordsoe; Fridolin Nordsoe; Edwin Serrano; Latesha Marrow
- Producer: Stuart Crichton

Stan Walker singles chronology
"Choose You" (2010)	"Homesick" (2010)	"Loud" (2011)

"Homesick" is a song by 2009 Australian Idol winner Stan Walker. Featuring guest vocals from rapper Kayo, "Homesick" serves as the third single released from Walker's second studio album, From the Inside Out. The song was made available for download on 29 October 2010. The original version of "Homesick" without Kayo is found on the album.

== Background ==
"Homesick" is a pop song, written by Frederick and Fridolin Nordsoe, Edwin Serrano and Latesha Marrow, and produced by Stuart Crichton. It is a song that explores the emotions of being away from the people and things we love. Walker told the Daily Mercury that "being homesick can mean many different things to people; for me it is missing New Zealand, the Gold Coast and my mum." Prior to the release of From the Inside Out, Walker posted a video previewing the song on YouTube. Of "Homesick" he said, "This is a song that really grew for me from the very beginning...it seems like the stronger songs are the ones you always remember." "Homesick" was sent to Australian contemporary hit radio on 25 October 2010. A week later, it became the eighth most added song to Australian radio, and the first most added song to New Zealand radio.

== Chart performance ==
"Homesick" debuted at number 29 on the New Zealand Singles Chart on 8 November 2010, and peaked at number 21 on 13 December 2010. The song was certified gold by the Recording Industry Association of New Zealand (RIANZ), for selling 7,500 copies.

== Music video and live performances ==
The accompanying music video for the single was directed by Robert Honti. It opens with Walker lying on a sofa, followed by him, dressed in black, singing the song on different coloured backdrops. During Kayo's verse, Walker is dressed in denim while Kayo wears a jacket and a cap. The clip is interspersed with scenes of Walker and his love interest sharing intimate moments. The video ends with Walker again lying on the sofa.

Walker performed "Homesick" at a shopping mall in Mt Pleasant Shopping Centre in Mackay, Queensland on 5 December 2010.

== Track listing ==
- Digital download – Part 1
1. "Homesick" featuring Kayo (Single version) – 3:45
2. "Homesick" featuring Kayo (Remix) – 3:42
- Digital download – Part 2
1. "Homesick" featuring Kayo – 3:45
2. "Inside Out" (Unplugged) – 4:10

== Charts ==
Chart (2010)	Peak position
New Zealand Singles Chart	21

== Certifications ==
Certifications and sales for "Homesick"
Region	Certification	Certified units/sales
New Zealand (RMNZ)	Gold	7,500^{*}
^{*} Sales figures based on certification alone.

== Personnel ==
- Craig Bauer – mixing
- Jeff Breakey – assistant mixing
- Stuart Crichton – production, programming, keys
- Cassie Davis – production, keys
- Frederick Nordsoe – writing
- Fridolin Nordsoe – writing
- Edwin Serrano – writing
- Latesha Marrow – writing

== Release history ==
Region	Date	Format	Label
Australia	29 October 2010	Digital download	Sony Music Australia
New Zealand	29 October 2010	Digital download	Sony Music Australia
