= Neda (musician) =

Neda Tenielle Neda
- Born: Carnarvon, Australia
- Genre: Alternative
- Instruments: Vocals, Guitar, Keys
- Years active: 2010–present
- Label: Island Records Australia
- Website: nedamusic.com.au

Tenielle Neda is an Australian singer-songwriter previously signed with Island Records Australia, a division of Universal Music Australia. In March 2013, Tenielle debuted her folk-inspired EP entitled Daylight Disguise under the Moniker "Neda".

== Discography ==
=== EPs ===
Year	Album	Certification
2013	Daylight Disguise: Date released: March 2013; Record label: Melke PTY LTD	

=== Singles ===
Year	Singles	Album
2012	"Dream of Flying”	Daylight Disguise
2013	"Moonshine”	Daylight Disguise
