= Black Box (song) =

Single by Stan Walker

from the album Introducing... Stan Walker
- Released: 22 November 2009
- Recorded: 2009
- Genre: R&B
- Length: 3:27
- Label: Sony
- Songwriters: Lucas Secon; Wayne Hector; Jonas Jeberg; Cutfather
- Producers: Cutfather; Jonas Jeberg

Stan Walker singles chronology
"Black Box" (2009)	"Unbroken" (2010)

Audio sample
- file; help

"Black Box" is the debut single by season seven winner of Australian Idol, Stan Walker. It was released digitally on 22 November 2009, as the lead single from his debut studio album, Introducing... Stan Walker.

Blue covered this song for their 2013 album Roulette.

== Critical reception ==
Jade from MusicFix compared the song to all other Australian Idol winners' singles and wrote that the "black box" metaphor differentiates it from the others. She called the sound a "generic R&B beat" and continued by comparing Walker's voice to fellow Australian Idol winner Guy Sebastian, saying that Australian Idol voters "decided one Sebastian just wasn't enough." At the 2010 New Zealand Music Awards, "Black Box" won the award for the 'Highest Selling New Zealand Single'. It was also named the 'Radio Airplay Record of the Year' at the ceremony, after topping the New Zealand Radio Airplay Chart for ten weeks. At the 2010 ARIA Music Awards, "Black Box" was nominated for 'Most Popular Australian Single'.

== Chart performance ==
On the New Zealand Singles Chart, "Black Box" debuted at number five on 30 November 2009. The following week, it peaked at number one, where it remained for ten consecutive weeks. On 14 February 2010, "Black Box" was certified double platinum by the Recording Industry Association of New Zealand (RIANZ), for selling 30,000 copies. In Australia, the song debuted and peaked at number two on the ARIA Singles Chart on 30 November 2009, selling 17,493 copies in its first week, and becoming the fastest-selling Sony Bandit.fm download ever. Eventually, "Black Box" was certified double platinum by the Australian Recording Industry Association (ARIA), for selling 140,000 copies.

== Music video and live performances ==
The music video for the song was directed by Gemma Lee and filmed in Sydney on 24 November 2009. In an interview with Nova FM, Walker explained, "There might be a little bit of group dancing ... we'll see what happens. At first I was really nervous but I've warmed up now and I'm getting into it. I'm working on my look ... It's pretty cool – it's my first ever film clip. It's basically a house party that explains the lyrics. It talks about a relationship that has gone down but everything is still recorded in the black box. I really like it." The video premiered on YouTube on 29 November 2009.

Walker performed "Black Box" on the New Zealand television show, Close Up, on 6 December 2009, the day before the release of his album, Introducing... Stan Walker. He again performed the song at Barry Curtis Park in Manukau City as part of celebrations of Waitangi Day (6 February) in 2010.

== Track listing ==
- Digital download
1. "Black Box" – 3:27

== Charts ==
=== Weekly charts ===
Chart (2009)	Peak position
ARIA Singles Chart	2
New Zealand Singles Chart	1

=== Year-end charts ===
Chart (2009)	Position
ARIA Singles Chart	50
Australian Artists Singles Chart	9
New Zealand Singles Chart	19
Chart (2010)	Position
ARIA Singles Chart	60
Australian Artists Singles Chart	4

== Certifications ==
Certifications and sales for "Black Box"
Region	Certification	Certified units/sales
Australia (ARIA)	2× Platinum	140,000^{^}
New Zealand (RMNZ)	2× Platinum	30,000^{*}
^{*} Sales figures based on certification alone.^{^} Shipments figures based on certification alone.

== Release history ==
Region	Date	Format	Label
Australia	22 November 2009	Digital download	Sony Music Australia
New Zealand	22 November 2009	Digital download	Sony Music Australia
Australia	25 November 2009	CD single	Sony Music Australia

== See also ==
- List of number-one singles from the 2000s (New Zealand)
