= Latroit =

American EDM producer, songwriter, DJ (born 1967)

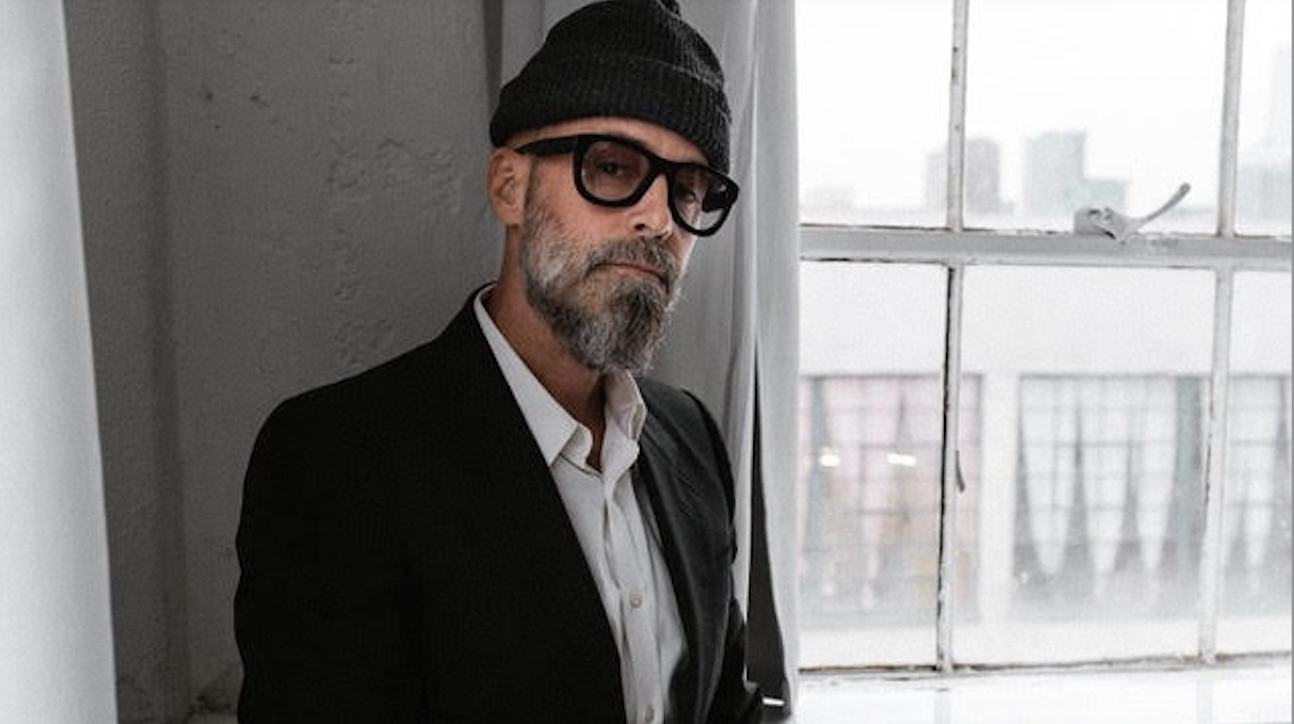
- White in 2022

Background information
- Also known as: Static Revenger
- Born: Dennis White; 1967 (age 58–59)
- Origin: Detroit, Michigan, US
- Genres: House; electronic
- Occupations: Producer; songwriter; DJ
- Years active: 1989–present
- Labels: Sony Music; Ministry of Sound; Dim Mak Records; Interscope; EMI; Warner Music; OneLove; Vicious Vinyl
- Website: latroit.com

Dennis White (born 1967), also known as Latroit and Static Revenger, is an American electronic dance music producer, songwriter and DJ. In 2018, he won the Grammy Award for Best Remixed Recording, Non-Classical for his remix of "You Move", originally by Depeche Mode.

== Early life, family and education ==
Dennis White was born in Detroit, Michigan, and raised in Utica, Michigan. A music prodigy, he attended Berklee School of Music, graduating in 1988.

== Career ==
Dennis White got his start in dance music when introduced to Kevin Saunderson from the Detroit techno group Inner City, and was hired as the music director for the Inner City 'Big Fun' world tour from 1989 to 1990 and signing as one of the first artists on KMS Records, Saunderson's record label imprint.

=== Static Revenger ===
As an artist, writer, and producer, he has credits on over 3.5 million records sold worldwide, and seven number-one Billboard club chart remixes for artists such as Swedish House Mafia.

As Static Revenger, he is best known for the ARIA double platinum certified release "I Like That" and "Happy People", which was charted by Fatboy Slim on Beatport as one of the top 10 Dance Music recordings of the decade.

=== Latroit ===
As Latroit, White has released recordings with Idris Elba, Inner City, Sam Sparro, and Le Youth. He has also remixed recordings for Depeche Mode, Deadmau5, and Nile Rogers. The Latroit remix of "You Move" by Depeche Mode won the 2018 Grammy Award in the 'Best Remixed Recording (Non-Classical)' category.

Latroit's single, "Nice" was featured in the Apple Phone XR global campaign.

In 2024, Latroit collaborated with South Africa's Soweto Gospel Choir and Simon Lewicki, also known as Groove Terminator, on the album History of House, which re-imagines house music classics through a Zulu, gospel music lens. The album features reimaginations of popular dance and pop classics such as "Ride Like The Wind" by Christopher Cross, Inner City's "Good Life", and "Everybody's Free (To Feel Good)" by Rozalla. In an interview with NPR's Ari Shapiro, White stated, "Our mission, the idea for the project was to bring dance music, which is undeniable — Western dance music, which is undeniably African American music, back to an African project and then re-export it to the world through an African perspective. That was the original sort of mission statement of the project." "History of House" was ranked #10 in KCRW's 30 Best Albums of 2024.
