= Phil Tan =

Malaysian-American audio engineer and mixer

Phil Tan is a Malaysian-American audio engineer and mixer. He is a three time Grammy Award recipient, having received 14 nominations for the award.

== Early life and education ==
Tan was born in Malaysia. He attended Full Sail University in Florida in the U.S., where he attained a degree in Recording Arts in 1990. Afterwards he moved to Atlanta, Georgia, where he embarked on a career as a recording engineer.

== Career ==
Tan's first big break came in 1992, working with Jermaine Dupri.

As a mixing engineer, he worked on three Grammy Award winning albums: Mariah Carey's "The Emancipation of Mimi" (Best Contemporary R&B Album, 2005), Ludacris' "Release Therapy" (Best Rap Album, 2006) and Rihanna's "Only Girl (In the World)" (Best Dance Recording, 2010). Tan was inducted into the Full Sail University Hall of Fame in 2009.

As of 2009, sales of albums and singles sold in the US with Tan listed in the credits as a mixer, engineer, remixer or producer totaled over 220 million.

Modern Mixing has called him "one of the most successful mixing engineers of all time", noting he worked on "26 singles that have reached number one on Billboard’s Hot 100 chart".
