= Stan Walker discography =

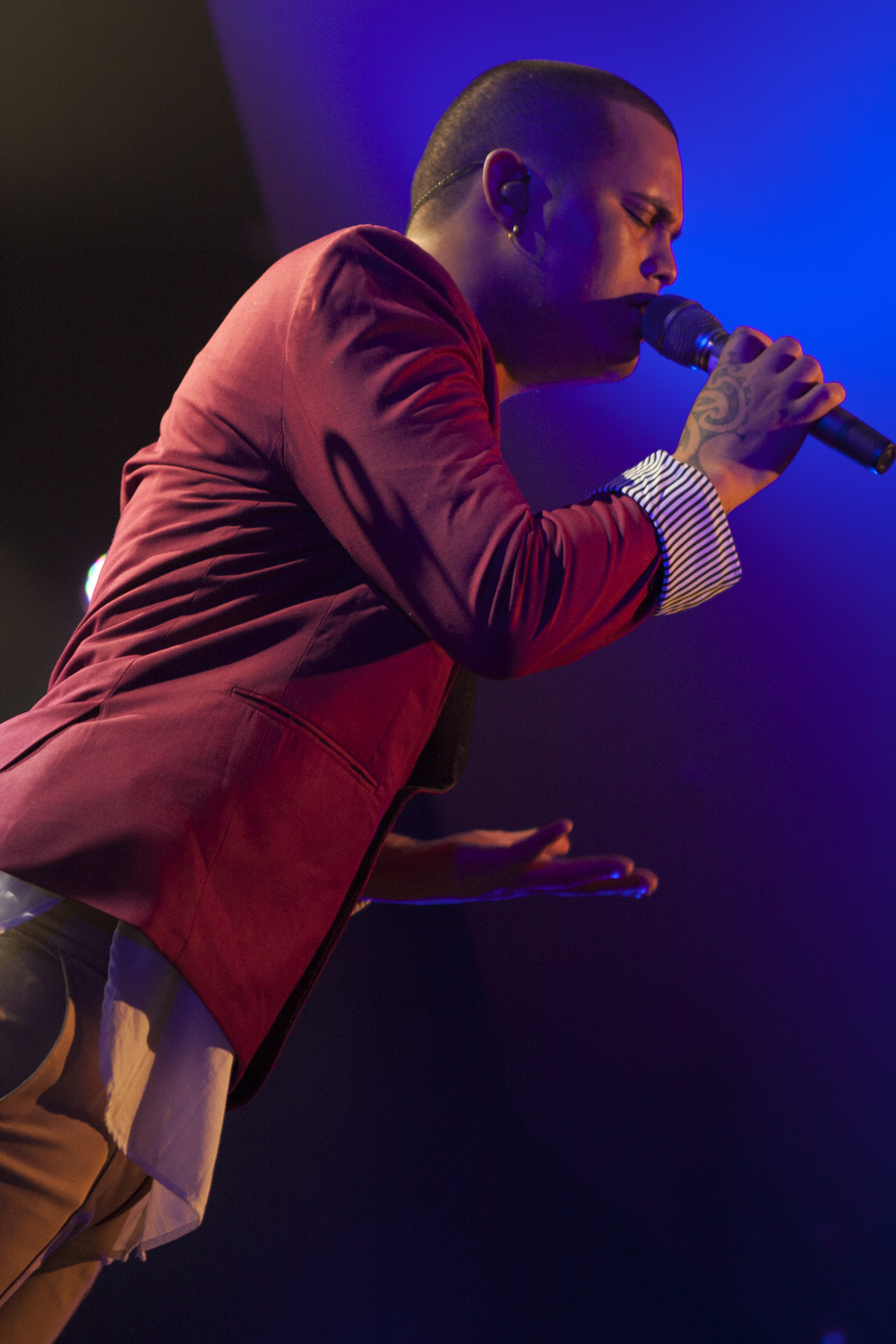
- Walker performing during his Galaxy Tour in 2012
- Studio albums: 7
- Extended plays: 2
- Compilation albums: 3
- Singles: 48
- Music videos: 21

New Zealand-Australian singer Stan Walker has released seven studio albums, two compilation albums, two extended plays, forty-eight singles—including seven as a featured artist—and twenty-one music videos. In 2009, Walker won the seventh season of Australian Idol, and signed a recording contract with Sony Music Australia. Walker's debut studio album Introducing Stan Walker, which contained selected songs he performed on Australian Idol, was released on 11 December 2009. The album debuted at number three on the Australian ARIA Albums Chart, and number two on the New Zealand Albums Chart. It was certified platinum by the Australian Recording Industry Association, and triple platinum by the Recorded Music NZ. The album's lead single "Black Box" peaked at number two on the ARIA Singles Chart, and number one on the New Zealand Singles Chart, eventually being certified double platinum in both countries.

Walker's second studio album From the Inside Out, was released on 20 August 2010. The album debuted at number two on the ARIA Albums Chart, and number one on the New Zealand Albums Chart, eventually being certified platinum by the RMNZ. The album's lead single "Unbroken" peaked at number 23 on the ARIA Singles Chart, and number nine on the New Zealand Singles Chart, eventually being certified gold in both countries. "Choose You" and "Homesick" were released as the album's second and third singles, respectively, and each attained moderate chart success. Walker's third studio album Let the Music Play was released on 18 November 2011. Three singles were released from the album: "Loud", "Light It Up" and "Music Won't Break Your Heart". "Take It Easy" was released as a single from the Mt. Zion film soundtrack; it was packaged with Walker's first three studio albums in a box set titled The Complete Collection. His fourth studio album, Inventing Myself, includes the singles "Take It Easy", "Bulletproof", "Inventing Myself" and "Like It's Over". As of October 2013, Walker has sold over 200,000 singles and nearly 100,000 albums.

== Studio albums ==
Title	Album details	Peak chart positions		Certifications
Title	Album details	AUS	NZ	Certifications
Introducing Stan Walker	Released: 11 December 2009; Label: Sony; Formats: CD, digital download	3	2	ARIA: Platinum; RMNZ: 3× Platinum
From the Inside Out	Released: 20 August 2010; Label: Sony; Formats: CD, digital download	2	1	RMNZ: Platinum
Let the Music Play	Released: 18 November 2011; Label: Sony; Formats: CD, digital download	18	12	
Inventing Myself	Released: 25 October 2013; Label: Sony; Formats: CD, digital download	—	3	RMNZ: Gold
Truth & Soul	Released: 17 April 2015; Label: Sony; Formats: CD, digital download	7	3	
Te Arohanui	Released: 17 September 2021; Label: Sony; Formats: CD, LP, digital download, streaming	—	16	
All In	Released: 19 August 2022; Label: Sony; Formats: CD, digital download, streaming	—	3	RMNZ: Gold
"—" denotes items which failed to chart.

== Live albums ==
Title	Details
Live with the Levites	Released: 30 October 2020; Label: Sony; Format: digital download, streaming

== Compilation albums ==
Title	Album details	Peak chart positions	Certifications
Title	Album details	NZ	Certifications
The Complete Collection (Note: Comprises four CDs: Introducing Stan Walker, From the Inside Out, Let the Music Play and "Take It Easy".)	Released: 3 May 2013; Label: Sony; Format: 4×CD box set	12	
The Platinum Collection (Note: Comprises four CDs: Introducing Stan Walker, From the Inside Out, Let the Music Play and Inventing Myself)	Released: 27 March 2015; Label: Sony; Format: 4×CD box set	16	
Impossible (Music by the Book)	Released: 25 September 2020; Label: Sony; Format: digital, streaming, CD	9	RMNZ: Platinum

== Extended plays ==
Title	EP details	Peak chart positions
Title	EP details	NZ
Stan	Released: 26 March 2018; Label: Sony; Format: digital download, streaming	17
Faith Hope Love	Released: 31 May 2019; Label: Grace Promotions; Format: digital download, streaming	—
Live from Parachute Studios, 2025	Released: 26 September 2025; Label: Akiaki; Format: digital download, streaming	—
"—" denotes items which were not released in that country or failed to chart.

== Singles ==
=== As lead artist ===
Title	Year	Peak chart positions				Certifications	Album
Title	Year	AUS	NZ	NZ Artist	US World	Certifications	Album
"Black Box"	2009	2	1	×	—	ARIA: 2× Platinum; RMNZ: 2× Platinum	Introducing Stan Walker
"Unbroken"	2010	23	9	×	—	ARIA: Gold; RMNZ: Gold	From the Inside Out
"Choose You"	2010	16	3	×	—	ARIA: Platinum; RMNZ: Platinum	From the Inside Out
"Homesick" (featuring Kayo)	2010	—	21	×	—	RMNZ: Gold	From the Inside Out
"Loud"	2011	9	8	14 (Note: Charted after the October 2011 establishment of the chart, five months after the single had peaked on the main New Zealand singles chart. In the week of the song's peak at number 8 on the main chart, it was the highest performing single by a New Zealand artist.)	—	ARIA: Platinum; RMNZ: Gold	Let the Music Play
"Light It Up" (featuring Static Revenger)	2011	45	23	5	—	ARIA: Gold; RMNZ: Gold	Let the Music Play
"Music Won't Break Your Heart"	2012	25	32	3	—	ARIA: Gold	Let the Music Play
"Take It Easy"	2012	—	5	1	—	RMNZ: 6× Platinum	Mt. Zion and Inventing Myself
"Bulletproof"	2013	—	2	1	—	RMNZ: Platinum	Inventing Myself
"Inventing Myself"	2013	—	27	5	—		Inventing Myself
"Like It's Over" (featuring Ria Hall)	2013	—	19	4	—	RMNZ: Gold	Inventing Myself
"Holding You" (with Ginny Blackmore)	2014	43	1	1	—	RMNZ: Platinum	Over the Moon
"Aotearoa" (featuring Ria Hall, Troy Kingi and Maisey Rika)	2014	—	2	1	—	RMNZ: 4× Platinum	Non-album single
"Start Again" (featuring Samantha Jade)	2015	—	—	10	—		Born to Dance OST
"You Never Know"	2016	86	— (Note: "You Never Know" did not enter the NZ Top 40 Singles Chart, but peaked at number two on the NZ Heatseekers Singles Chart.)	2	—		Non-album singles
"Messages"	2017	—	— (Note: "Messages" did not enter the NZ Top 40 Singles Chart, but peaked at number three on the NZ Heatseekers Singles Chart.)	5	—		Non-album singles
"Tennessee Whiskey" (with Parson James)	2017	—	—	15	—	RMNZ: 3× Platinum	Non-album singles
"New Takeover"	2017	—	— (Note: "New Takeover" did not enter the NZ Top 40 Singles Chart, but peaked at number eight on the NZ Heatseekers Singles Chart.)	5	—		Non-album singles
"Find You (The Stolen)"	2017	—	—	— (Note: "Find You (The Stolen)" did not enter the NZ Artists Top 40 Singles Chart, but peaked at number 1 on the NZ Artists Singles Heatseekers Chart.)	—		Stan
"Thank You"	2018	—	— (Note: "Thank You" did not enter the NZ Top 40 Singles Chart, but peaked at number seven on the NZ Heatseeker Singles Chart.)	6	—		Stan
"Gimme Your Love"	2018	—	— (Note: "Gimme Your Love" did not enter the NZ Top 40 Singles Chart, but peaked at number 18 on the NZ Hot Singles Chart.)	— (Note: "Gimme Your Love" did not enter the NZ Artist Top 40 Singles Chart, but peaked at number 4 on the NZ Artists Hot 20 Singles Chart.)	—		Non-album single
"Give"	2019	—	— (Note: "Give" did not enter the NZ Top 40 Singles Chart, but peaked at number four on the NZ Hot Singles Chart.)	5	—	RMNZ: Platinum	Impossible (Music by the Book)
"Choose" (featuring Hamo Dell)	2019	—	— (Note: "Choose" did not enter the NZ Top 40 Singles Chart, but peaked at number six on the NZ Hot Singles Chart.)	11	—	RMNZ: Gold	Impossible (Music by the Book)
"Cool Down" (with Seth Haapu)	2019	—	—	— (Note: "Cool Down" did not enter the NZ Artist Top 40 Singles Chart, but peaked at number 9 on the NZ Artists Hot 20 Singles Chart.)	—		Non-album singles
"Mexico" (featuring Kings)	2020	—	— (Note: "Mexico" did not enter the NZ Top 40 Singles Chart, but peaked at number 28 on the NZ Hot Singles Chart.)	— (Note: "Mexico" did not enter the NZ Artist Top 40 Singles Chart, but peaked at number 7 on the NZ Artists Hot 20 Singles Chart.)	—		Non-album singles
"Slow Down" (featuring Kaylan)	2020	—	—	— (Note: "Slow Down" did not enter the NZ Artist Top 40 Singles Chart, but peaked at number 7 on the NZ Artists Hot 20 Singles Chart.)	—		Non-album singles
"I Don't Want the Fame"	2020	—	— (Note: "I Don't Want the Fame" did not enter the NZ Top 40 Singles Chart, but peaked at number 40 on the NZ Hot Singles Chart.)	— (Note: "I Don't Want the Fame" did not enter the NZ Artist Top 40 Singles Chart, but peaked at number 4 on the NZ Artists Hot 20 Singles Chart.)	—		Non-album singles
"Bigger" (solo or with Parson James)	2020	—	25	5	—	RMNZ: 3× Platinum	All In (bonus disc)
"Don't Worry Baby" (with Celina Sharma)	2021	—	— (Note: "Don't Worry Baby" did not enter the NZ Top 40 Singles Chart, but peaked at number three on the NZ Hot Singles Chart.)	8	—	RMNZ: Platinum	All In
"Tau Te Mārire / Take It Easy"	2021	—	— (Note: "Tau Te Mārire / Take It Easy" did not enter the NZ Top 40 Singles Chart, but peaked at number 14 on the NZ Hot Singles Chart.)	19	—		Te Arohanui
"Matemateāone"	2021	—	— (Note: "Matemateāone" did not enter the NZ Top 40 Singles Chart, but peaked at number eight on the NZ Hot Singles Chart.)	14	—	RMNZ: Gold	Te Arohanui / All In
"Come Back Home"	2021	—	— (Note: "Come Back Home" did not enter the NZ Top 40 Singles Chart, but peaked at number eight on the NZ Hot Singles Chart.)	20	—	RMNZ: Gold	All In
"Human" (featuring Vince Harder and Louis Baker)	2021	—	— (Note: "Human" did not enter the NZ Top 40 Singles Chart, but peaked at number nine on the NZ Hot Singles Chart.)	—	—		All In
"Feelings" (featuring Kings)	2022	—	— (Note: "Feelings" did not enter the NZ Top 40 Singles Chart, but peaked at number 12 on the NZ Hot Singles Chart.)	18	—		All In
"The One You Want (60s Song)" (featuring JessB)	2022	—	— (Note: "The One You Want (60s Song)" did not enter the NZ Top 40 Singles Chart, but peaked at number five on the NZ Hot Singles Chart.)	20	—		All In
"Favourite Part About Christmas"	2022	—	—	—	—		Non-album singles
"I Am"	2023	—	19	2	6	RMNZ: Platinum	Non-album singles
"Māori ki te Ao"	2024	—	— (Note: "Māori ki te Ao" did not enter the NZ Top 40 Singles Chart, but peaked at number one on the NZ Hot Singles Chart.)	3	—	RMNZ: Platinum	TBA
"Ki Taku Awa"	2024	—	— (Note: "Ki Taku Awa" did not enter the NZ Top 40 Singles Chart, but peaked at number 11 on the NZ Hot Singles Chart.)	10	—		TBA
"Back to the River"	2024	—	— (Note: "Back to the River" did not enter the NZ Top 40 Singles Chart, but peaked at number 25 on the NZ Hot Singles Chart.)	—	—		TBA
"Mō Āke Tonu" (featuring Hana-Rāwhiti Maipi-Clarke)	2025	—	— (Note: "Mō Āke Tonu" did not enter the NZ Top 40 Singles Chart, but peaked at number 31 on the NZ Hot Singles Chart.)	—	—		TBA
"One Life" (featuring Nauti)	2026	—	— (Note: "One Life" did not enter the NZ Top 40 Singles Chart, but peaked at number 8 on the NZ Hot Singles Chart.)	—	—		TBA
"Family Tree"	2026	—	— (Note: "Family Tree" did not enter the NZ Top 40 Singles Chart, but peaked at number 36 on the NZ Hot Singles Chart.)	—	—		Moana: Voices Across the Ocean
"Kāinga" / "Home"	2026	—	— (Note: "Kāinga" did not enter the NZ Top 40 Singles Chart, but peaked at number 21 on the NZ Hot Singles Chart.)	—	—		Non-album single
"—" denotes items which were not released in that country or failed to chart. "×" denotes periods where charts did not exist or were not archived.

=== As featured artist ===
Title	Year	Peak chart positions			Certifications	Album
Title	Year	AUS	NZ	NZ Artist	Certifications	Album
"Stuck in a Box" (Young Sid featuring Stan Walker)	2010	—	15	×		What Doesn't Kill Me... and From the Inside Out
"Galaxy" (Jessica Mauboy featuring Stan Walker)	2011	13	36	5	ARIA: Platinum; RMNZ: Gold	Get 'Em Girls
"Song for Everyone" (All Star Cast)	2014	—	—	5		Non-album singles
"Stay" (Tūtahi featuring Stan Walker)	2020	—	— (Note: "Stay" did not enter the NZ Top 40 Singles Chart, but peaked at number 10 on the NZ Hot Singles Chart.)	16		Non-album singles
"Cold Nights" (Pacific Heights featuring Stan Walker and Larissa Lambert)	2022	—	— (Note: "Cold Nights" did not enter the NZ Top 40 Singles Chart, but peaked at number five on the NZ Hot Singles Chart.)	—		The Waters Between / All In
"Pōuri" (Pacific Heights featuring Stan Walker and Crete)	2022	—	— (Note: "Pōuri" did not enter the NZ Top 40 Singles Chart, but peaked at number 16 on the NZ Hot Singles Chart.)	—		TBA
"Father's Eyes" (Kobie Dee featuring Stan Walker)	2023	—	—	—		TBA
"Way Back Home" (The Green featuring Stan Walker)	2026	—	—	—		Titles
"—" denotes items which were not released in that country or failed to chart. "×" denotes periods where charts did not exist or were not archived.

=== Promotional singles ===
Title	Year	Peak chart positions	Album
Title	Year	NZ Hot	Album
"Stand Up" (Note: Walker has recorded two songs titled "Stand Up". The first is a cover of The Feelers' song, and was released in New Zealand only as the official supporter song of the All Whites' campaign for the 2010 FIFA World Cup. The second is an original track from From the Inside Out; a music video was filmed to promote The Chronicles of Narnia: The Voyage of the Dawn Treader soundtrack.)	2010	×	Non-album singles
"Waltzing Matilda" (Note: "Waltzing Matilda" is a cover that was released to promote the 2012 Summer Olympics in Australia.) (with Jessica Mauboy)	2012	×	Non-album singles
"Te Arohanui"	2021	20	Te Arohanui
"×" denotes periods where charts did not exist or were not archived.

== Other charted songs ==
Title	Year	Peak chart positions		Album
Title	Year	NZ	NZ Artist	Album
"Purple Rain"	2009	33	×	Introducing Stan Walker
"Bully" (featuring Herbie Crichlow)	2013	—	17	Inventing Myself
"I Can't Make You Love Me" (with Ginny Blackmore)	2014	24	2	"Holding You" (Note: "I Can't Make You Love Me" is the B-side to the Ginny Blackmore single "Holding You".)
"I Surrender"	2018	—	— (Note: "You Never Know" did not enter the NZ Top 40 Singles Chart, but peaked at number two on the NZ Heatseekers Singles Chart.)	Stan
"Whakamoemiti"	2018	—	— (Note: "Whakamoemiti" did not enter the NZ Top 40 Singles Chart, but peaked at number three on the NZ Heatseekers Singles Chart.)	Stan
"New Light"	2019	—	— (Note: "New Light" did not enter the NZ Artist Top 40 Singles Chart, but peaked at number 7 on the NZ Artists Hot 20 Singles Chart.)	Faith Hope Love
"Moemoeā"	2019	—	— (Note: "Moemoeā" did not enter the NZ Artist Top 40 Singles Chart, but peaked at number 15 on the NZ Artists Hot 20 Singles Chart.)	Faith Hope Love
"Ultralight Beam"	2019	—	— (Note: "Ultralight Beam" did not enter the NZ Artist Top 40 Singles Chart, but peaked at number 16 on the NZ Artists Hot 20 Singles Chart.)	Faith Hope Love
"Tēnā Rā Koe / Thank You"	2019	—	8	Waiata / Anthems
"Tua" (featuring Ibanez Maeva)	2020	—	— (Note: "Tua" did not enter the NZ Artist Top 40 Singles Chart, but peaked at number 2 on the NZ Artists Hot 20 Singles Chart.)	"Bigger" (Note: "Tua" is the Māori language version of "Bigger", and features as the B-side to the "Bigger" single.) / Te Arohanui
"He Kākano Āhau" (featuring the Levites)	2020	—	— (Note: "He Kākano Āhau" did not enter the NZ Artist Top 40 Singles Chart, but peaked at number 13 on the NZ Artists Hot 20 Singles Chart.)	Live with the Levites and Te Arohanui
"Poor Boy"	2021	—	— (Note: "Poor Boy" did not enter the NZ Artist Top 40 Singles Chart, but peaked at number 2 on the NZ Artists Hot 20 Singles Chart.)	True Colours, New Colours: The Songs of Split Enz
"—" denotes items which were not released in that country or failed to chart. "×" denotes periods where charts did not exist or were not archived.

== Guest appearances ==
List of guest appearances, with selected chart positions
Title	Year	Peak chart positions	Album
Title	Year	NZ Hot	Album
"Little Drummer Boy"	2010	—	All I Want for Christmas
"What Happened to Us" (Remix) (with Jessica Mauboy)	2011	—	Non-album song
"My Help (Psalm 121)"	2012	—	Hope – Songs of Faith and Inspiration
"Don't Dream It's Over" (with Isaiah Firebrace)	2020	—	Deadly Hearts: Walking Together
"Tāiri Te Aroha – End Title"	2022	33	The Lion King Reo Māori (Original Motion Picture Soundtrack)
"Mānawa maiea Matariki" (with TAWAZ featuring Hone, HERA, Hops, Neps & Rani)	2025	16	

== Music videos ==
Title	Year	Director(s)
"Black Box"	2009	Gemma Lee
"Unbroken"	2010	Matthew Chuang
"Stand Up"^{[A]}	2010	
"Stuck in a Box"	2010	Andrew Morton
"Choose You"	2010	Marc Furmie
"Homesick"	2010	Robert Honti
"Stand Up"^{[A]}	2010	
"Loud"	2011	
"Light It Up"	2011	
"Galaxy"	2011	Melvin J. Montalban
"Music Won't Break Your Heart"	2012	Benn Jae
"Take It Easy"	2012	
"Bulletproof"	2013	Shae Sterling
"Inventing Myself"	2013	Shae Sterling
"Like It's Over"	2013	Shae Sterling
"Holding You"	2014	Jessica Sanderson
"Aotearoa"	2014	Shae Sterling
"Start Again"	2015	Shae Sterling
"You Never Know"	2016	Shae Sterling
"Messages"	2017	
"Tennessee Whiskey"	2017	Shae Sterling
"New Takeover"	2017	Shae Sterling
"Find You (The Stolen)"	2017	
"Thank You"	2018	
"Gimme Your Love"	2018	
"Give"	2019	
"Choose"	2019	
"Cool Down"	2019	Shae Sterling
"Bigger"	2020	
"Don't Worry Baby"	2021	
"Matemateāone"	2021	
"Come Back Home"	2021	
"Human"	2021	
"The One You Want (60s Song)"	2022	
"I Am"	2023	
"Māori ki te ao"	2024	Stan Walker, Shae Sterling
