= New Zealand top 50 singles of 2013 =

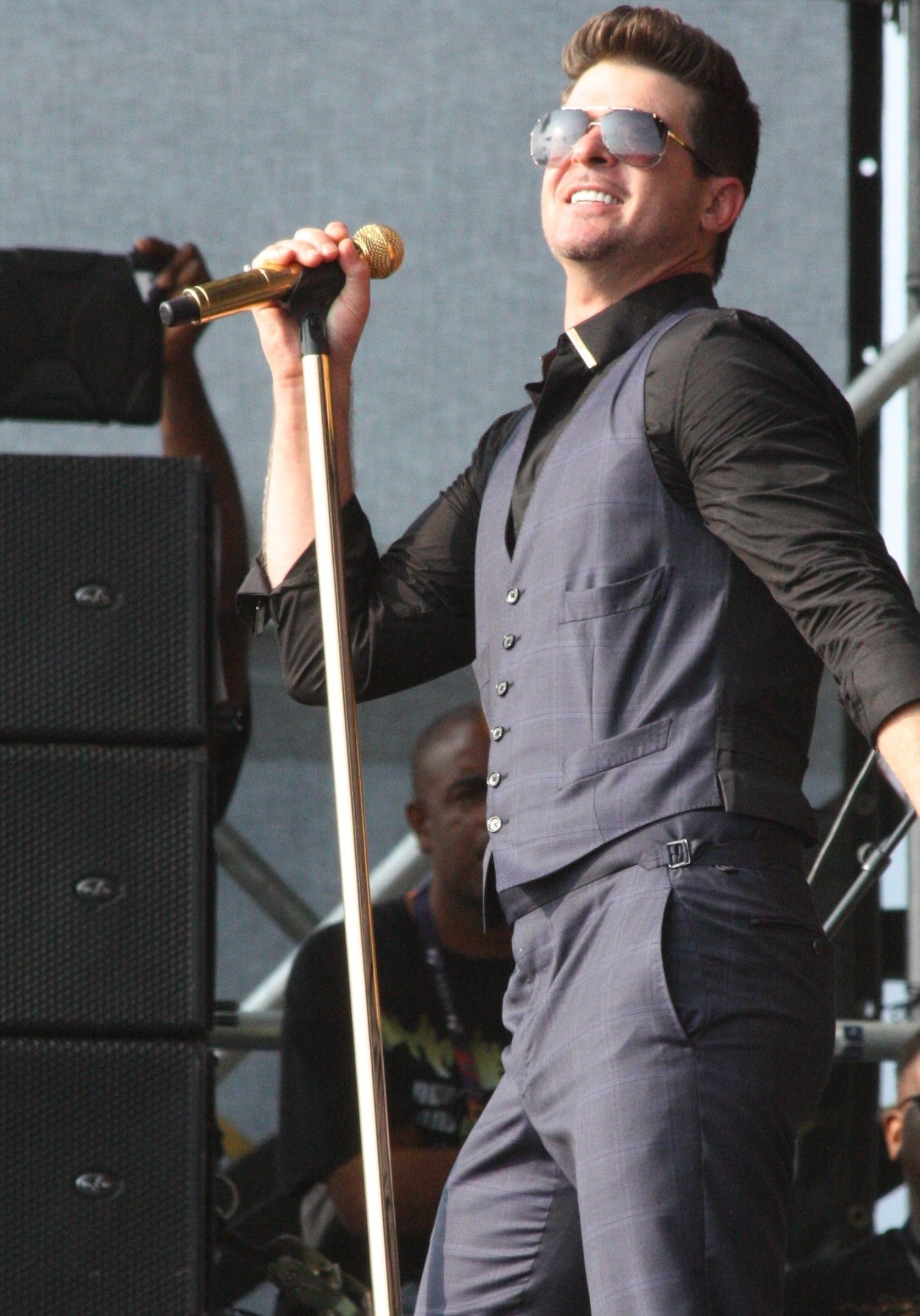
American singer Robin Thicke's "Blurred Lines" was the top performing song of the year

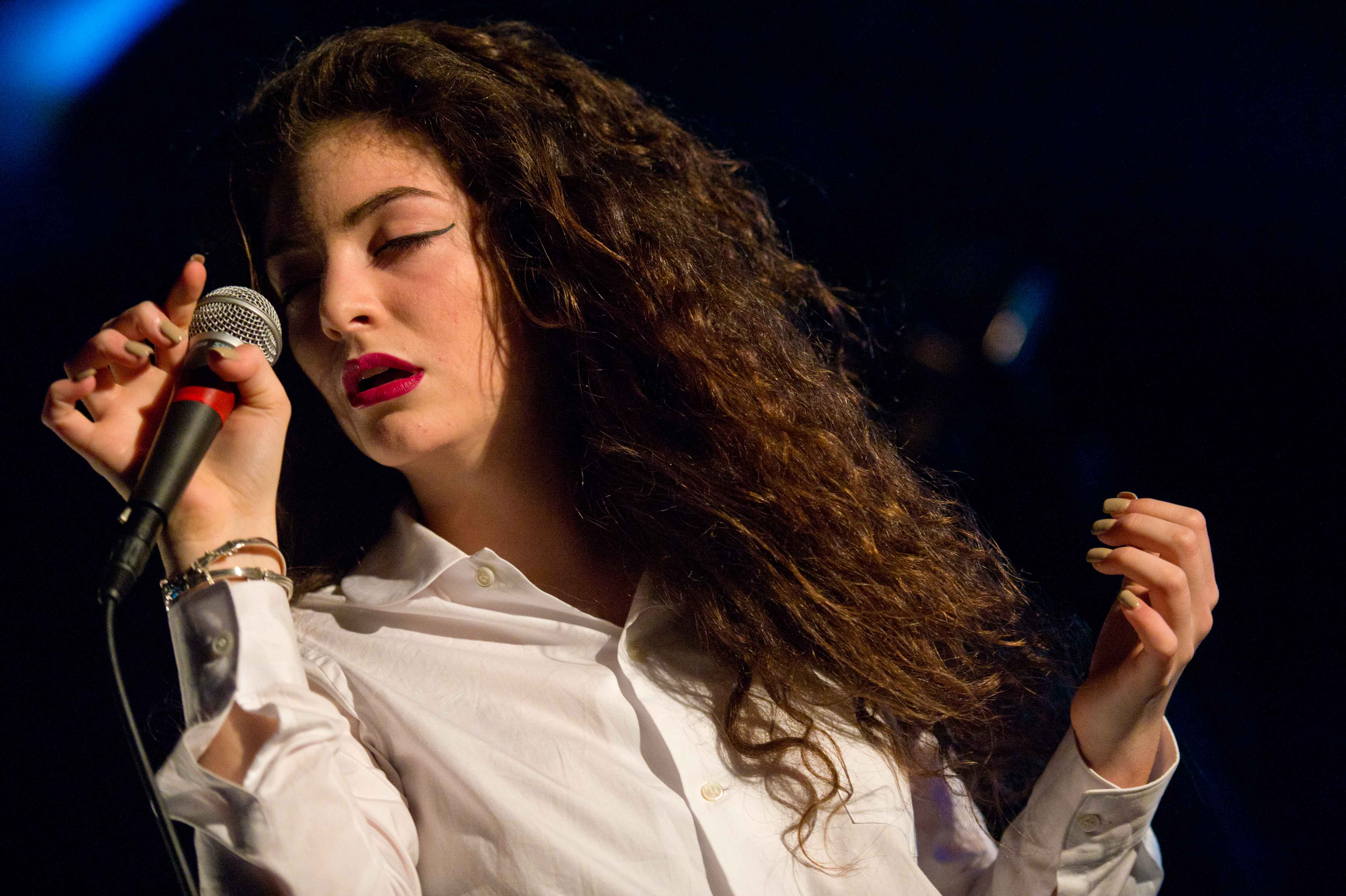
New Zealand singer Lorde released four of the top 20 songs by New Zealand artists in 2013, including the best performing song, "Royals"

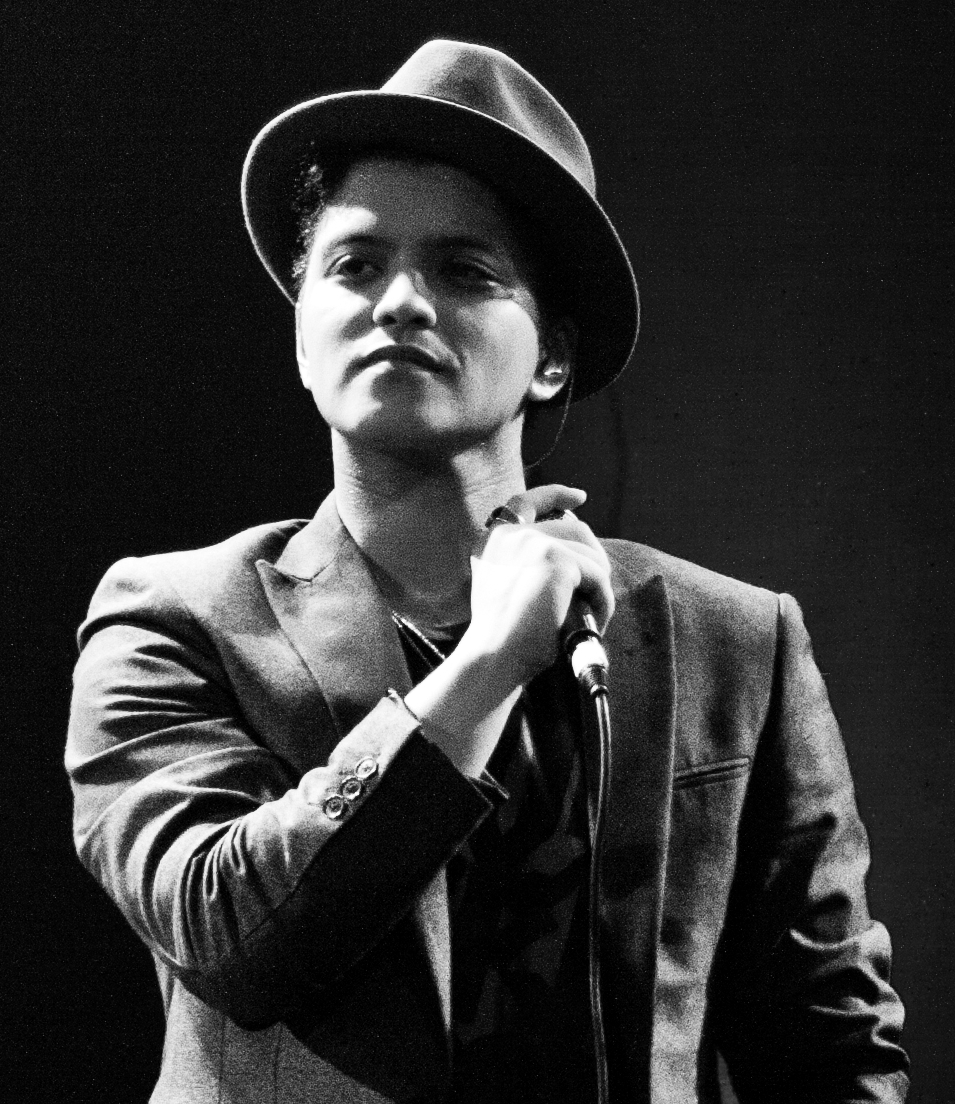
Three songs by American singer Bruno Mars were among the top 50 singles of the year

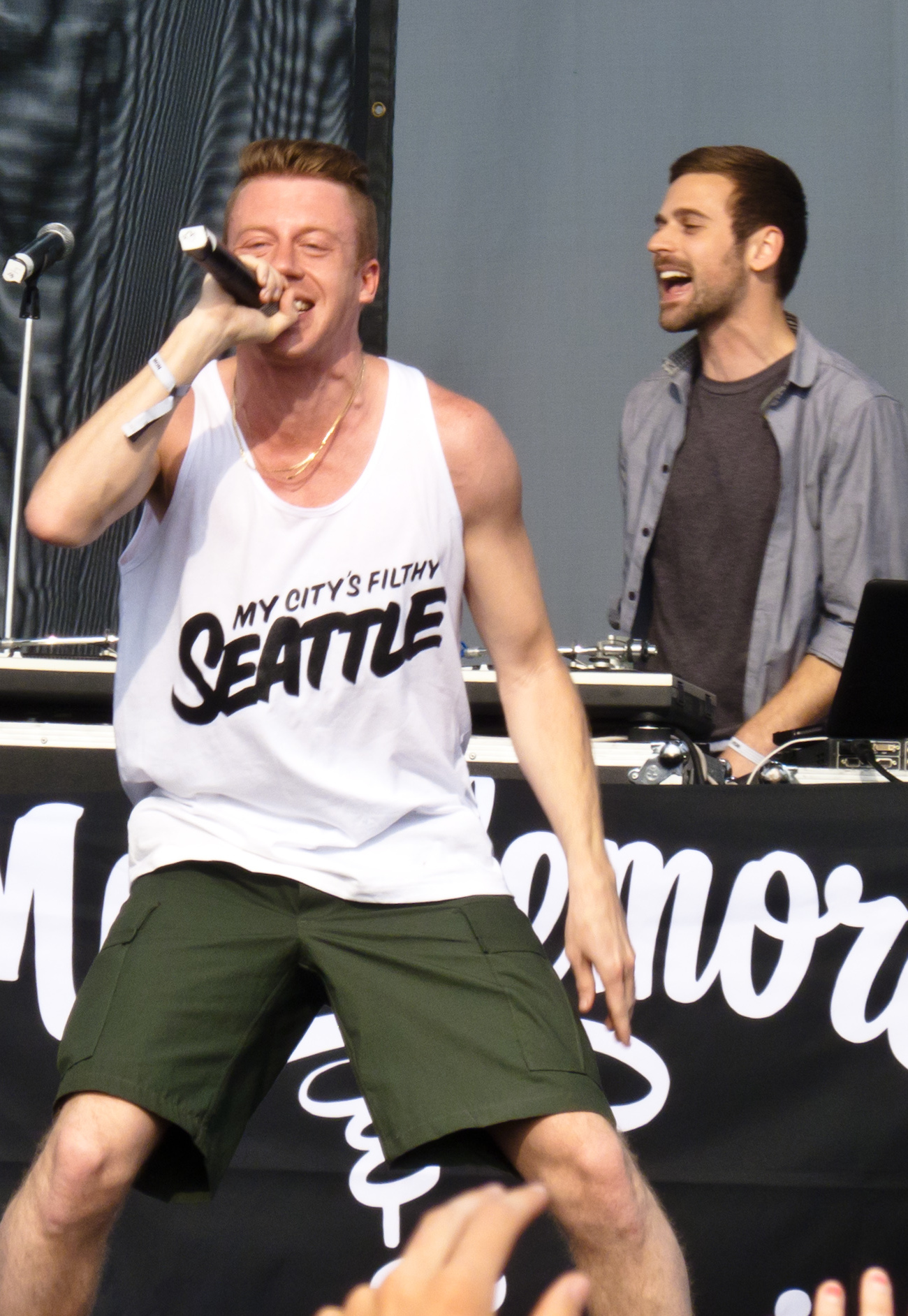
Three of the top songs of the year were performed by American hip-hop duo Macklemore & Ryan Lewis

This is a list of the top-selling singles in New Zealand for 2013 from the Official New Zealand Music Chart's end-of-year chart, compiled by Recorded Music NZ.

== Chart ==
Key
† – Song of New Zealand origin (Note: Whether or not a song is of New Zealand origin is determined by the RIANZ)

Rank	Artist	Title
1	Robin Thicke featuring T.I. & Pharrell Williams	"Blurred Lines" from the album, Blurred Line
2	Lorde	"Royals"† from the extended play, The Love Club and the album, Pure Heroine
3	Pink featuring Nate Ruess	"Just Give Me a Reason" from the album, The Truth About Love
4	Katy Perry	"Roar" from the album, Prism
5	James Arthur	"Impossible" from the album, James Arthur
6	Passenger	"Let Her Go" from the album, All The Little Lights
7	Imagine Dragons	"Radioactive" from the album, Night Visions and the extended play, Continued Silence
8	Avicii featuring Aloe Blacc	"Wake Me Up" from the album, True
9	Daft Punk featuring Pharrell Williams & Nile Rodgers	"Get Lucky" from the album, Random Access Memories
10	Bruno Mars	"When I Was Your Man" from the album, Unorthodox Jukebox
11	Macklemore & Ryan Lewis featuring Ray Dalton	"Can't Hold Us" from the album, The Heist
12	OneRepublic	"Counting Stars" from the album, Native
13	Rihanna featuring Mikky Ekko	"Stay" from the album, Unapologetic
14	Labrinth featuring Emeli Sandé	"Beneath Your Beautiful" from the album, Electronic Earth
15	Macklemore & Ryan Lewis featuring Mary Lambert	"Same Love" from the album, The Heist
16	The Lumineers	"Ho Hey" from the album, The Lumineers
17	Stan Walker	"Take It Easy"† from the Mt. Zion soundtrack and the album, Inventing Myself
18	Macklemore and Ryan Lewis featuring Wanz	"Thrift Shop" from the album, The Heist
19	Lorde	"Tennis Court"† from the album, Pure Heroine
20	Justin Timberlake	"Mirrors" from the album, The 20/20 Experience
21	Ginny Blackmore	"Bones"† from the album, Over the Moon
22	will.i.am featuring Britney Spears	"Scream & Shout" from the album, #willpower
23	Birdy	"Skinny Love" from the album, Birdy
24	Jason Derulo featuring 2 Chainz	"Talk Dirty" from the albums, Tattoos & Talk Dirty
25	Bastille	"Pompeii" from the album, Bastille
26	Miley Cyrus	"We Can't Stop" from the album, Bangerz
27	MKTO	"Thank You" from the album, MKTO
28	Frank Ocean	"Lost" from the album, Channel Orange
29	Katy Perry featuring Juicy J	"Dark Horse" from the album, Prism
30	Taylor Swift	"I Knew You Were Trouble" from the album, Red
31	Fergie, Q-Tip and GoonRock	"A Little Party Never Killed Nobody (All We Got)" from The Great Gatsby soundtrack
32	Naughty Boy featuring Sam Smith	"La La La" from the album, Hotel Cabana
33	Pitbull featuring Christina Aguilera	"Feel This Moment" from the album, Global Warming
34	Eminem featuring Rihanna	"The Monster" from the album, The Marshall Mathers LP 2
35	Miley Cyrus	"Wrecking Ball" from the album, Bangerz
36	Jackie Thomas	"It's Worth It"† from the album, Jackie Thomas
37	Of Monsters and Men	"Little Talks" from the album, My Head Is An Animal and the extended play, Into the Woods
38	Swedish House Mafia featuring John Martin	"Don't You Worry Child" from the album, Until Now
39	Olly Murs featuring Flo Rida	"Troublemaker" from the album, Right Place Right Time
40	Imagine Dragons	"Demons" from the album, Night Visions and the extended play, Continued Silence
41	MKTO	"Classic" from the album, MKTO
42	Stan Walker	"Bulletproof"† from the album, Inventing Myself
43	Bruno Mars	"Treasure" from the album, Unorthodox Jukebox
44	David Guetta featuring Sia	"Titanium" from the album, Nothing But The Beat
45	Bruno Mars	"Locked Out of Heaven" from the album, Unorthodox Jukebox
46	Ed Sheeran	"I See Fire" from The Hobbit: The Desolation Of Smaug soundtrack and the album x
47	Rudimental featuring Ella Eyre	"Waiting All Night" from the album, Home
48	Ellie Goulding	"Figure 8" from the album, Halcyon
49	Pitbull featuring Kesha	"Timber" from the extended play, Meltdown
50	Baauer featuring Héctor Delgado & Jayson Musson	"Harlem Shake" from the single, of the same name

== Top 20 singles of 2013 by New Zealand artists ==
Key
– Songs that appeared on the Top 50 Chart.

Rank	Artist	Title
1	Lorde	"Royals" from the extended play, The Love Club EP and the album, Pure Heroine
2	Stan Walker	"Take It Easy" from the Mt. Zion soundtrack and the album, Inventing Myself
3	Lorde	"Tennis Court" from the album, Pure Heroine
4	Ginny Blackmore	"Bones" from the album, Over the Moon
5	Jackie Thomas	"It's Worth It" from the album, Jackie Thomas
6	Stan Walker	"Bulletproof" from the album, Inventing Myself
7	Lorde	"Team" from the album, Pure Heroine
8	Benny Tipene	"Walking On Water" from the extended play, Toulouse
9	Shapeshifter	"In Colour" from the album, Delta
10	David Dallas	"Runnin'" from the album, Falling Into Place
11	Lorde	"The Love Club" from the extended play, The Love Club
12	Opshop	"Never Leave Me Again" from the single of the same name
13	Dane Rumble featuring Jupiter Project	"Not Alone" from the album, Exodus
14	Aotearoa Reggae All Stars	"Sensitive to a Smile" from the single of the same name
15	Whenua Patuwai	"Something Special" from the single of the same name
16	Aaradhna	"Wake Up" from the album, Treble & Reverb
17	Titanium	"Come On Home" from the album, All For You
18	Ginny Blackmore	"SFM" from the album, Over the Moon
19	Stan Walker featuring Ria Hall	"Like It's Over" from the album, Inventing Myself
20	Willy Moon	"Yeah Yeah" from the album, Here's Willy Moon

== Chart by numbers ==
=== Origin ===
==== By artist ====
The following shows the country of origin from where the artist (including any featured artist where applicable) originate from. Artists who appear more than once have only been tallied once.

Country	Total
United States	37
England	13
New Zealand	4
Sweden	3
Australia	2
France	2
Barbados	1
Iceland	1
Scotland	1
Wales	1

Notes
- Although born in England, Emeli Sandé was raised in Scotland and as such both countries have been included in her tally.
- Although from New Zealand, Stan Walker was discovered in Australia, as such both countries have been included in his tally.
- While regarded as a duo, Macklemore and Ryan Lewis have been classed as separate entities.

==== By single ====
The following shows the country of origin from which the singles originate regardless of who the artist is.

Country	Total
United States	28
England	10
New Zealand	6
Australia	2
France	2
Sweden	2
Barbados	1
Iceland	1

Notes
- Although from New Zealand, Stan Walker was discovered in Australia, as such both countries have been included in his tally.

=== Most singles ===
Shows the artists with the most singles to appear in this chart. Includes where they appear as a featured artist, however where a singer (e.g. Adam Levine) appears as a guest singer, this does not count towards their groups (e.g. Maroon 5) tally.

Artist	Total
Bruno Mars	3
Macklemore	3
Ryan Lewis	3
Imagine Dragons	2
Katy Perry	2
Lorde	2
Miley Cyrus	2
MKTO	2
Pharrell Williams	2
Pitbull	2
Rihanna	2
Stan Walker	2

=== Format ===
The following shows where each single appears on, whether it was the artists album, a non-album single, an extended play or as part of a soundtrack.

Format	Total
Albums	38
Soundtracks	3
EP	4
non-album singles	1

Notes
- The song "Royals" appears on the extended play, The Love Club and the album, Pure Heroine, both by Lorde
- The songs "Radioactive" and "Demons" appear on the extended play, Continued Silence and the album, Night Visions, both by Imagine Dragons.
- The song "Take It Easy" appears on the soundtrack for Mt Zion and Stan Walker’s album, Inventing Myself.
- The song "Talk Dirty", appears on the albums, Talk Dirty and Tattoos, both by Jason Derulo.
- The song "Little Talks", appears on the extended play Into The Woods and the album, My Head Is An Animal, both by Of Monsters & Men.
- The song "I See Fire" appears on the soundtrack for The Hobbit: The Desolation of Smaug and Ed Sheeran’s album, x.

=== Multiple releases ===
The following shows singles that had multiple releases from the same album.

Title	Total	Singles
Bangerz (Miley Cyrus)	2	We Can’t Stop; Wrecking Ball
Inventing Myself (Stan Walker)	2	Bulletproof; Take It Easy
MKTO (MKTO)	2	Classic; Thank You
Night Visions (Imagine Dragons)	2	Demons; Radioactive
Prism (Katy Perry)	2	Dark Horse; Roar
Pure Heroine (Lorde)	2	Royals; Tennis Court
The Heist (Macklemore & Ryan Lewis)	3	Thrift Shop; Can’t Hold Us; Same Love
Unorthodox Jukebox (Bruno Mars)	3	Locked Out of Heaven; Treasure; When I Was Your Man

=== Type ===
The following shows the denomination that each single was released as, whether as a solo artist or as part of a group, band or duo. Also shows how many singles had guest artists.

Type	Total
Solo artists	35
Groups	14
Featured Artists	22
Collaborations	1

Notes
- Although uncredited in the song, Wake Me Up, Aloe Blacc has been included in the tally for featured artists.
- Macklemore & Ryan Lewis have been regarded as a group in this instance.
- While uncredited but having lines from their songs sampled into the Harlem Shake, Jayson Musson & Héctor Delgado have been included in the tally as a featured artist.

=== Top Genre ===
The following shows the most common genres the Top 50 singles are regarded as (as per their genre descriptions in the singles entries. Where a genre was not noted, the genre of the album/extended play was used instead.

Genre	Total	Singles
Pop	14	Bones (Ginny Blackmore); Classic (MKTO); Impossible (James Arthur); It’s Worth It (Jackie Thomas); Just Give Me a Reason (Pink featuring Nate Ruess); Lost (Frank Ocean); Mirrors (Justin Timberlake); Stay (Rihanna featuring Mikky Ekko); Talk Dirty(Jason Derulo); Titanium (David Guetta featuring Sia); Troublemaker (Olly Murs featuring Flo Rida); We Can’t Stop (Miley Cyrus); When I Was Your Man (Bruno Mars); Wrecking Ball (Miley Cyrus)
R&B	12	Beneath Your Beautiful (Labrinth featuring Emeli Sandé); Blurred Lines (Robin Thicke featuring Pharrell Williams & T.I.); Bulletproof (Stan Walker); Can’t Hold Us (Macklemore & Ryan Lewis featuring Ray Dalton); Impossible (James Arthur); La La La (Naughty Boy featuring Sam Smith); Lost (Frank Ocean); Mirrors (Justin Timberlake); Stay (Rihanna featuring Mikky Ekko); Take It Easy (Stan Walker); Talk Dirty (Jason Derulo); We Can’t Stop (Miley Cyrus)
Hip Hop	5	Can’t Hold Us (Macklemore & Ryan Lewis featuring Ray Dalton); Dark Horse (Katy Perry); Harlem Shake (Baauer featuring Héctor Delgado & Jayson Musson ) Talk Dirty (Jason Derulo); The Monster (Eminem featuring Rihanna)
Dance-Pop	4	Feel This Moment (Pitbull featuring Christina Aguilera); La La La (Naughty Boy) featuring Sam Smith); Scream & Shout (will.i.am featuring Britney Spears); Timber (Pitbull featuring Ke$ha)
Disco	3	Blurred Lines (Robin Thicke featuring Pharrell Williams & T.I.); Get Lucky (Daft Punk featuring Pharrell Williams & Nile Rodgers); Treasure (Bruno Mars)
Funk	3	Blurred Lines (Robin Thicke featuring Pharrell Williams & T.I.); Get Lucky (Daft Punk featuring Pharrell Williams & Nile Rodgers); Treasure (Bruno Mars)
Indie folk	3	Ho Hey (The Lumineers); Little Talks (Of Monsters & Men); Skinny Love (Birdy)
Alternative rock	2	Demons (Imagine Dragons); Radioactive (Imagine Dragons)
Dance	2	Bulletproof (Stan Walker); Take It Easy (Stan Walker)
Dubstep	2	Figure 8 (Ellie Goulding); I Knew You Were Trouble (Taylor Swift)
EDM	2	Feel This Moment (Pitbull) featuring Christina Aguilera); Timber (Pitbull featuring Ke$ha)
Electronic rock	2	Figure 8 (Ellie Goulding); Radioactive (Imagine Dragons)
Electropop	2	I Knew You Were Trouble (Taylor Swift); Royals (Lorde)
Folk	2	Counting Stars (OneRepublic); I See Fire (Ed Sheeran)
Folktronica	2	Timber (Pitbull featuring Ke$ha); Wake Me Up (Avicii featuring Aloe Blacc)
Indie pop	2	Let Her Go (Passenger; Little Talks (Of Monsters & Men)
Pop rap	2	Classic (MKTO); Thank You (MKTO)
Pop rock	2	Demons (Imagine Dragons); I Knew You Were Trouble (Taylor Swift)
Progressive house	2	Don’t You Worry Child (Swedish House Mafia featuring John Martin); Wake Me Up
Soul	2	Treasure (Bruno Mars); Wake Me Up (Avicii featuring Aloe Blacc)
Synthpop	2	Impossible (James Arthur; Pompeii (Bastille)
Trap	2	Dark Horse (Katy Perry); Harlem Shake (Baauer featuring Héctor Delgado & Jayson Musson )

=== Top Labels ===
The following shows the most common record labels that a single was associated with. Any label that only had one single has not been noted.

Label	Total	Singles
Interscope Records	7	A Little Party Never Killed Nobody (All We Got) (Fergie, GoonRock & Q-Tip); Blurred Lines (Robin Thicke featuring Pharrell Williams & T.I.); Counting Stars (OneRepublic); Demons (Imagine Dragons); Radioactive (Imagine Dragons); Scream & Shout (will.i.am featuring Britney Spears); The Monster (Eminem featuring Rihanna)
Atlantic Records	6	Locked Out Of Heaven (Bruno Mars; Skinny Love (Birdy); Talk Dirty (Jason Derulo); Treasure (Bruno Mars); Waiting All Night (Rudimental featuring Ella Eyre); When I Was Your Man (Bruno Mars)
RCA Records	6	Feel This Moment (Pitbull); Just Give Me a Reason (Pink featuring Nate Ruess); Mirrors (Justin Timberlake); Timber (Pitbull featuring Ke$ha); We Can’t Stop (Miley Cyrus); Wrecking Ball (Miley Cyrus)
Sony Music Entertainment	5	Bulletproof (Stan Walker); Impossible (James Arthur); It’s Worth It (Jackie Thomas); Let Her Go (Passenger); Take It Easy (Stan Walker)
Capitol Records	4	Dark Horse (Katy Perry); La La La (Naughty Boy featuring Sam Smith); Roar (Katy Perry); Titanium (David Guetta featuring Sia)
Columbia Records	4	Classic (MKTO); Get Lucky (Daft Punk featuring Pharrell Williams & Nile Rodgers); Thank You (MKTO); Wake Me Up (Avicii featuring Aloe Blacc)
Virgin Records	4	Don’t You Worry Child (Swedish House Mafia featuring John Martin; Pompeii (Bastille); Royals (Lorde); Titanium (David Guetta featuring Sia)
Lava Records	3	Royals (Lorde); Tennis Court (Lorde); Wake Me Up (Avicii featuring Aloe Blacc)
Macklemore LLC	3	Can’t Hold Us (Macklemore & Ryan Lewis featuring Ray Dalton); Same Love (Macklemore & Ryan Lewis featuring Mary Lambert); Thrift Shop (Macklemore & Ryan Lewis featuring Wanz)
Syco Music	3	Beneath Your Beautiful (Labrinth featuring Emeli Sandé); Impossible (James Arthur; Troublemaker (Olly Murs featuring Flo Rida)
Def Jam Recordings	2	Lost (Frank Ocean); Stay (Rihanna featuring Mikky Ekko)
Epic Records	2	Bones (Ginny Blackmore); Troublemaker (Olly Murs featuring Flo Rida)
KIDinaKORNER	2	Demons (Imagine Dragons); Radioactive (Imagine Dragons)
Mr. 305 Inc.	2	Feel This Moment (Pitbull featuring Christina Aguilera); Timber (Pitbull featuring Ke$ha)
Polo Ground Records	2	Feel This Moment (Pitbull featuring Christina Aguilera); Timber (Pitbull featuring Ke$ha)
Republic Records	2	Royals (Lorde); Tennis Court (Lorde)
Universal Music Group	2	Royals (Lorde); Tennis Court (Lorde)
Virgin EMI Records	2	La La La (Naughty Boy featuring Sam Smith); Tennis Court (Lorde)

=== Top songwriters ===
The following shows the songwriters who had the most top-selling singles of 2014 in New Zealand.

Writer	Total	Singles
Lukasz Gottwald	4	Dark Horse (Katy Perry); Roar (Katy Perry); Timber (Pitbull featuring Ke$ha); Wrecking Ball (Miley Cyrus)
Henry Walter	4	Dark Horse (Katy Perry); Roar (Katy Perry); Timber (Pitbull featuring Ke$ha); Wrecking Ball (Miley Cyrus)
Ari Levine	3	Locked Out Of Heaven (Bruno Mars); Treasure (Bruno Mars); When I Was Your Man (Bruno Mars)
Ben Haggerty	3	Can’t Hold Us (Macklemore & Ryan Lewis featuring Ray Dalton); Same Love (Macklemore & Ryan Lewis featuring Mary Lambert); Thrift Shop (Macklemore & Ryan Lewis featuring Wanz)
Bruno Mars	3	Locked Out Of Heaven (Bruno Mars); Treasure (Bruno Mars); When I Was Your Man (Bruno Mars)
Philip Lawrence	3	Locked Out Of Heaven (Bruno Mars); Treasure (Bruno Mars); When I Was Your Man (Bruno Mars)
Ryan Lewis	3	Can’t Hold Us (Macklemore & Ryan Lewis featuring Ray Dalton); Same Love (Macklemore & Ryan Lewis featuring Mary Lambert); Thrift Shop (Macklemore & Ryan Lewis featuring Wanz)
Alexander Grant	2	Demons (Imagine Dragons); Radioactive (Imagine Dragons)
Andrew Goldstein	2	Classic (MKTO); Thank You (MKTO)
Armando Pérez	2	Feel This Moment (Pitbull featuring Christina Aguilera); Timber (Pitbull featuring Ke$ha)
Ben McKee	2	Demons (Imagine Dragons); Radioactive (Imagine Dragons)
Dan Platzman	2	Demons (Imagine Dragons); Radioactive (Imagine Dragons)
Dan Reynolds	2	Demons (Imagine Dragons); Radioactive (Imagine Dragons)
Ella Yelich O'Connor	2	Royals (Lorde); Tennis Court (Lorde)
Emanuel Kiriakou	2	Classic (MKTO); Thank You (MKTO)
Evan "Kidd" Bogart	2	Classic (MKTO); Thank You (MKTO)
Joel Little	2	Royals (Lorde); Tennis Court (Lorde)
Josh Mosser	2	Demons (Imagine Dragons); Radioactive (Imagine Dragons)
Katheryn Hudson	2	Dark Horse (Katy Perry featuring Juicy J); Roar (Katy Perry)
Max Martin	2	Dark Horse (Katy Perry featuring Juicy J); Roar (Katy Perry)
Pharrell Williams	2	Blurred Lines (Robin Thicke featuring Pharrell Williams & T.I.); Get Lucky (Daft Punk featuring Pharrell Williams & Nile Rodgers)
Stan Walker	2	Bulletproof (Stan Walker); Take It Easy (Stan Walker)
Wayne Sermon	2	Demons (Imagine Dragons); Radioactive (Imagine Dragons)

=== Most/Least songwriters ===
The following shows the singles that were credited as having been written by only one person and the singles that had the most credited writers of 2014.

Single	Total	Songwriter/s
"Bones" (Ginny Blackmore)	1	Virginia Blackmore
"Bulletproof" (Stan Walker)	1	Stanley Walker
"Counting Stars" (OneRepublic)	1	Ryan Tedder
"I See Fire" (Ed Sheeran)	1	Edward Sheeran
"Let Her Go" (Passenger)	1	Mike Rosenberg
"Pompeii''" (Bastille)	1	Dan Smith
"Skinny Love" (Birdy)	1	Justin Vernon
"Take It Easy" (Stan Walker)	1	Stanley Walker
"Timber" (Pitbull featuring Ke$ha)	16	Aaron Davis Arnold; Breyan Stanley Isaac; Charles Carter; Greg Errico; Jamie Sanderson; Keri Oskar; Kesha Sebert; Lee Oskar; Pebe Sebert; Priscilla Hamilton; Roger Parker; Steve Arrington; Waung Hankerson; Henry Walter; Lukasz Gottwald; Armando Pérez

=== Top producers ===
The following shows the producers who had the most singles to appear on this chart.

Producer	Total	Singles
Henry Walter	4	Dark Horse (Katy Perry); Roar (Katy Perry); Timber (Pitbull featuring Ke$ha); Wrecking Ball (Miley Cyrus)
Lukasz Gottwald	4	Dark Horse (Katy Perry); Roar (Katy Perry); Timber (Pitbull featuring Ke$ha); Wrecking Ball (Miley Cyrus)
Ari Levine	3	Locked Out Of Heaven (Bruno Mars); Treasure (Bruno Mars); When I Was Your Man (Bruno Mars)
Bruno Mars	3	Locked Out Of Heaven (Bruno Mars); Treasure (Bruno Mars); When I Was Your Man (Bruno Mars)
Max Martin	3	Dark Horse (Katy Perry); I Knew You Were Trouble (Taylor Swift); Roar (Katy Perry)
Philip Lawrence	3	Locked Out Of Heaven (Bruno Mars); Treasure (Bruno Mars); When I Was Your Man (Bruno Mars)
Ryan Lewis	3	Can’t Hold Us (Macklemore & Ryan Lewis featuring Ray Dalton); Same Love (Macklemore & Ryan Lewis featuring Mary Lambert); Thrift Shop (Macklemore & Ryan Lewis featuring Wanz)
Alexander Grant	2	Demons (Imagine Dragons); Radioactive (Imagine Dragons)
Emanuel Kiriakou	2	Classic (MKTO); Thank You (MKTO)
Evan "Kidd" Bogart	2	Classic (MKTO); Thank You (MKTO)
Jeff Bhasker	2	Just Give Me a Reason (Pink featuring Nate Ruess); Locked Out Of Heaven (Bruno Mars)
Joel Little	2	Royals (Lorde); Tennis Court (Lorde)
Stanley Walker	2	Bulletproof (Stan Walker); Take It Easy (Stan Walker)
