= Impossible (Music by the Book) =

Compilation album by Stan Walker
- Released: 25 September 2020
- Recorded: 2009–2019
- Length: 86:02
- Label: Sony Music

Stan Walker chronology
Faith Hope Love (2018)	Impossible (Music by the Book) (2020)	Te Arohanui (2021)

Impossible (Music by the Book) is a compilation album by New Zealand-Australian singer Stan Walker, released on 25 September 2020 to coincide with the release of his first memoir, Impossible. The album compiles tracks from four of five of Walker's studio albums, one of two EPs and numerous non-album singles and guest appearances. The album peaked at number 9 in New Zealand.

An abridged version of the album was released on CD in Australia in December 2020.

== Track listings ==
=== Digital ===
Digital download and streaming track listing
No.	Title	Writer(s)	Album	Length
1.	"Take It Easy"	Anthony Egizii; David Musumeci; Stan Walker	Mt. Zion soundtrack	3:08
2.	"Black Box"	Lucas Secon; Wayne Hector; Jonas Jeberg; Mich Hedin Hansen	Introducing Stan Walker	3:29
3.	"Aotearoa" (featuring Ria Hall, Troy Kingi and Maisey Rika)	Vince Harder; Troy Kingi; Walker	non-album single	3:13
4.	"Choose You"	Cassie Davis; Carl Dimataga; Stuart Crichton	From the Inside Out	3:38
5.	"Tennessee Whiskey" (with Parson James)	Dean Dillon; Linda Hargrove	non-album single	4:22
6.	"Bulletproof"	Harder; Lindsay Rhimes; Walker	Inventing Myself	3:37
7.	"Give"	Walker; Matiu Walters	non-album single	3:17
8.	"Thank You"	Michael Fatkin; Harder; Walker	Stan	3:58
9.	"Choose" (featuring Hamo Dell)	Matt Sadgrove; Walker	non-album single	3:49
10.	"Loud"	Jon Asher; Drew Pearson; Stephen Wrabel	Let the Music Play	3:24
11.	"Holding You" (with Ginny Blackmore)	Ginny Blackmore; Walker	Over the Moon	3:39
12.	"New Takeover"	Alexander Goodwin; Mike Hunnid; Sidney Swift; Walker	non-album single	3:20
13.	"Music Won't Break Your Heart"	Egizii; Musumeci; Walker	Let the Music Play	3:19
14.	"Hallelujah"	Leonard Cohen	Introducing Stan Walker	2:50
15.	"Galaxy" (with Jessica Mauboy)	Brad Ackley; Ferras Alqaisi; Chico Bennett; Dominique Calvillo; Brett McLaughlin; Richard Vission	Let the Music Play	4:03
16.	"Tēnā Rā Koe / Thank You"	Michael Fatkin; Harder; Tīmoti Kāretu; Walker	Waiata / Anthems	3:57
17.	"Unbroken"	Ryan Tedder	From the Inside Out	4:35
18.	"Whakamoemiti"	Walker	Stan	3:57
19.	"Inventing Myself"	Andy Macken; Thomas Macken	Inventing Myself	3:58
20.	"Find You" (with Maisey Rika)	Inoke Finau; Maisey Rika; Walker	Stan	3:24
21.	"Ordinary People"	John Legend; will.i.am	Introducing Stan Walker	2:59
22.	"Purple Rain"	Prince	Introducing Stan Walker	3:17
23.	"I Surrender"	Walker	Stan	6:49
Total length:				86:02

=== Compact disc ===
CD track listing
No.	Title	Writer(s)	Album	Length
1.	"Take It Easy"	Anthony Egizii; David Musumeci; Stan Walker	Mt. Zion	3:08
2.	"Black Box"	Lucas Secon; Wayne Hector; Jonas Jeberg; Mich Hedin Hansen	Introducing Stan Walker	3:29
3.	"Aotearoa" (featuring Ria Hall, Troy Kingi and Maisey Rika)	Vince Harder; Troy Kingi; Walker	non-album single	3:13
4.	"Choose You"	Cassie Davis; Carl Dimataga; Stuart Crichton	From the Inside Out	3:38
5.	"Tennessee Whiskey" (with Parson James)	Dean Dillon; Linda Hargrove	non-album single	4:22
6.	"Bulletproof"	Harder; Lindsay Rhimes; Walker	Inventing Myself	3:37
7.	"Give"	Walker; Matiu Walters	non-album single	3:17
8.	"Thank You"	Michael Fatkin; Harder; Walker	Stan	3:58
9.	"Choose" (featuring Hamo Dell)	Matt Sadgrove; Walker	non-album single	3:49
10.	"Holding You" (with Ginny Blackmore)	Ginny Blackmore; Walker	Over the Moon	3:39
11.	"New Takeover"	Alexander Goodwin; Mike Hunnid; Sidney Swift; Walker	non-album single	3:20
12.	"Hallelujah"	Leonard Cohen	Introducing Stan Walker	2:50
13.	"Tēnā Rā Koe / Thank You"	Michael Fatkin; Harder; Tīmoti Kāretu; Walker	Waiata / Anthems	3:57
14.	"Unbroken"	Ryan Tedder	From the Inside Out	4:35
Total length:				50:52

== Charts ==
=== Weekly charts ===
Weekly chart performance for Impossible (Music by the Book)
Chart (2020)	Peak position
New Zealand Albums (RMNZ)	9

=== Year-end charts ===
Year-end chart performance for Impossible (Music by the Book)
Chart (2021)	Position
New Zealand Albums (RMNZ)	23

== Certifications and sales ==
Region	Certification	Certified units/sales
New Zealand (RMNZ)	Platinum	15,000^{‡}
^{‡} Sales+streaming figures based on certification alone.

== Release history ==
Release history for Impossible (Music by the Book)
Region	Date	Format	Label	Catalogue
New Zealand	25 September 2020	Digital download; streaming	Sony Music Australia	—N/a
Australia	11 December 2020	CD	Sony Music Australia	19439841312
