= You Never Know =

You Never Know may refer to:

- You Never Know (musical), 1938
- You Never Know (album), by drummer Peter Erskine featuring pianist John Taylor and bassist Palle Danielsson, 1992
- You Never Know (Ai song), 2019
- You Never Know (Blackpink song), 2020
- You Never Know (George Duke song), 2013
- "You Never Know" (Solid Base song), 1996
- "You Never Know" (Stan Walker song), 2016
- "You Never Know", song by Beartooth from Disease, 2018
- "You Never Know", song by Dave Matthews Band from Busted Stuff, 2002
- "You Never Know", song by Goldfrapp from Supernature, 2005
- "You Never Know", song by Hanson from This Time Around, 2000
- "You Never Know", song by Sara Evans from Slow Me Down, 2014
- You Never Know (film), a 1922 film with Louis Dumar

== See also ==
- Never Know (disambiguation)
- You'll Never Know (disambiguation)
