= Te Arohanui =

Studio album by Stan Walker
- Released: 17 September 2021
- Length: 46:30
- Label: Sony
- Producers: Hugh Lake; Hamley; Carl Dimataga; Matt Sadgrove; Djeisan Suskov; Vince Harder; Devin Abrams; Christian Mausia; Stuart Hawkes

Stan Walker chronology
Impossible (Music by the Book) (2020)	Te Arohanui (2021)	All In (2022)

Singles from Te Arohanui
- 1. "Tau Te Mārire" Released: 3 September 2021; 2. "Matemateāone" Released: 10 September 2021; 3. "Te Arohanui" Released: 17 September 2021

Te Arohanui is the sixth studio album by New Zealand recording artist Stan Walker. It is Walker's first in te reo Māori and released on 17 September 2021 by Sony Music New Zealand and features a combination of Walker's greatest hits re-recorded in te reo Māori and several new tracks. The album was announced on 31 August 2021 and is dedicated to his late grandmother.

In an interview with Newshub, Walker said now is "the perfect time" to release a Te Reo record, saying "It was always meant to be. It happened at a time where there's a shift within the people, within everybody who calls Aotearoa home. Music is the most powerful gift and tool that we have. I feel like our reo is like poetry and waiata. It's something that teaches, educates, heals, uplifts, breaks down and gives people permission to feel in ways that they couldn't feel. Our reo, equally, does the same thing for me. I think it's a powerful time to release reo Māori waiata."

The album title is in honour of his family matriarch, Te Arohanui McLeod (nee Nepia), affectionately known as "Nanny Taini".

== Track listing ==
No.	Title	Writer(s)	Length
1.	"Tua / Bigger" (featuring Ibanez Maeva)	Ashton Parson; Michael Jade; Ryan Lewis; Stan Walker	3:07
2.	"Tau te Marire / Take It Easy"	Anthony Egizii; David Musumeci; Tawaroa Kawana; Walker	3:19
3.	"Tauutuutu / Give"	Matiu Walters; Walker	3:18
4.	"Tena Ra Koe / Thank You"	Charles Vincent Harder; Michael Fitkin; Walker	3:57
5.	"Find You" (with Maisey Rika)	Inoke Finau; Maisey Rika; Walker	5:33
6.	"Aotearoa" (with Ria Hall, Troy Kingi and Maisey Rika)	Harder; Troy Kingi; Walker	3:13
7.	"Whakaemoemiti"	Walker	3:57
8.	"Kowhiria Atu / Choose" (featuring Hamo Dell)	Matt Sadgrove; Walker	3:50
9.	"He Tangata / Human" (featuring Vince Harder)	Devin Abrams; Kawana; Harder	3:16
10.	"Te Arohanui"	Ta Taepa Kameta	3:20
11.	"Unuhia / I Surrender"	Walker	6:51
12.	"Matemateāone"	Abrams; Isiah Ngawaka; Mikey Dam; Ruth Smith; Walker	2:49
Total length:			46:30

== Charts ==
=== Weekly charts ===
Chart performance for Te Arohanui
Charts (2021)	Peak position
New Zealand Albums (RMNZ)	16
New Zealand Artist Albums (RMNZ)	3

=== Year-end charts ===
Year-end chart performance for Te Arohanui
Chart (2021)	Position
New Zealand Artist Albums (RMNZ)	18
Chart (2022)	Position
New Zealand Artist Albums (RMNZ)	17
