= You'll Never Know (disambiguation) =

"You'll Never Know" is a popular song written by Harry Warren from 1943.

You'll Never Know may also refer to:

- "You'll Never Know" (1927 song), 1989
- "You'll Never Know" (Kim Richey song), 1998
- "You'll Never Know", a song by Michael Learns to Rock from the album Played on Pepper, 1995
- "You'll Never Know", a song by Krystal Meyers from the album Make Some Noise, 2008
- "You'll Never Know", a song by Ariana Grande from the album Yours Truly, 2013
- You'll Never Know (film), also known as Tu ne sauras jamais, a 2023 Canadian drama film directed by Robin Aubert

== See also ==
- Never Know (disambiguation)
- You Never Know (disambiguation)
