= Never Know (disambiguation) =

"Never Know" is a 2021 single by Bad Omens.

Never Know may also refer to:

- "Never Know", a song by 6lack from Free 6lack, 2016
- "Never Know", a song by Dhani Harrison from In Parallel, 2017
- "Never Know", a song by Jack Johnson from In Between Dreams, 2005
- "Never Know", a song by Luciano from Exot, 2020
- "Never Know", a song by Nav from Bad Habits, 2019

== See also ==
- You Never Know (disambiguation)
- You'll Never Know (disambiguation)
