= Summerbeatz =

2010 concert tour

- National tour by Flo Rida, Jay Sean, Ciara, Ja Rule, Travie McCoy, Stan Walker, DJ Nino Brown
- Promotional poster for the Summerbeatz 2010 tour
- Location: Australia, Oceania
- Start date: 19 November 2010
- End date: 25 November 2010
- Legs: 1
- No. of shows: 4 Australia

Summerbeatz was a 2010 concert tour held in Australia featuring Flo Rida, Jay Sean, Ciara, Ja Rule and Travie McCoy with special guests Stan Walker, Giulietta (who won the support act slot through a competition) and DJ Nino Brown.

== Background ==
The original line up of acts touring for Summerbeatz included Flo Rida, Jay Sean, Soulja Boy, Travie McCoy, Stan Walker and DJ Nino Brown. However Soulja Boy had later decided to pull out of the tour and was replaced by Ja Rule. In October 2010 it was announced that Ciara and Akon would be joining the line up of acts. However Akon did not tour in Melbourne. Promoter Dwayne Cross released a statement saying "It's with great regret that we announce that Akon will not be performing in Melbourne on the Summerbeatz 2010 Tour. This is due to restrictions put on us by the Melbourne venue Rod Laver Arena." Jay Sean did not make an appearance at the Brisbane and Sydney shows due to a death in his family.

== Tour dates ==
Date	City	Country	Venue
19 November 2010	Brisbane	Australia	Brisbane Entertainment Centre
20 November 2010	Sydney	Australia	Acer Arena
23 November 2010	Perth	Australia	Burswood Dome
25 November 2010	Melbourne	Australia	Rod Laver Arena
