= Hatefuck =

Hatefuck may refer to:

- "Hatefuck", a song by the Bravery from Stir the Blood
- "Hatefuck", a song by Cruel Youth from +30mg
- "Hatefuck", a song by Motionless in White from Infamous
- "Hatefuck", a song by Pussy Riot featuring Slayyyter from Matriarchy Now
