= Railroad Track (song) =

Single by Willy Moon

from the album Here's Willy Moon
- B-side: "Bang Bang (My Baby Shot Me Down)"
- Released: 20 August 2012
- Recorded: 2012
- Genre: Alternative dance
- Length: 2:24
- Label: Third Man
- Songwriter: Willy Moon
- Producers: Willy Moon, Steve MacKey

Willy Moon singles chronology
"She Loves Me" (2011)	"Railroad Track" (2012)	"Yeah Yeah" (2012)

"Railroad Track" is a song by New Zealand-born musician, singer and producer Willy Moon released in 2012 by Jack White's label Third Man Records.

The B-side was written by Sonny Bono in 1966 and first performed by Cher. Moon changed the lyrics to adapt his interlocutor to be a female. The music is closer to the adaptation by Nancy Sinatra.

== Music video ==
A music video for the song was directed by American musician Michael Carter. The video shows American celebrations and an urban environment ruined by time. There is also religious and death imagery throughout the video. There is also unsubtle Bud Light product placement.

== Track listing ==
No.	Title	Length
1.	"Railroad Track"	2:24
2.	"Bang Bang"	2:24

== Personnel ==
Mixed by Mark Rankin
Photography by Jo McCaughy
Design by Matthew Jacobson & Julian Baker
