= Here's Willy Moon =

Studio album by Willy Moon
- Released: 8 April 2013
- Recorded: 2012
- Genre: Indie pop, rock and roll, noise pop, alternative dance
- Length: 28:49 (standard edition); 33:36 (deluxe edition)
- Label: Interscope (US); Island (international)

Willy Moon chronology
Willy Moon EP (2012)	Here's Willy Moon (2013)	+30mg (2016)

Singles from Here's Willy Moon
- 1. "Railroad Track" Released: 20 August 2012; 2. "Yeah Yeah" Released: 10 September 2012

Here's Willy Moon is the only studio album by New Zealand singer, Willy Moon. The album was released in the United States through Interscope Records on 9 April 2013. The album fused various genres together, with elements of rock and roll, indie pop, noise pop and alternative dance. Here's Willy Moon garnered positive reviews from critics and spawned two singles: "Railroad Track" and "Yeah Yeah".

== Singles ==
The album's first single, "Railroad Track", was released on 20 August 2012. The album's second single, "Yeah Yeah", was released on 10 September 2012. The song samples Wu-Tang Clan's 1993 song "Wu-Tang Clan Ain't Nuthing ta Fuck Wit" from the rap group's debut album Enter the Wu-Tang (36 Chambers). It was featured in Apple's iPod commercial in late 2012 and peaked at number 26 in the UK charts and number 18 on the Billboard's Hot Rock Songs chart. Other singles did not chart, but have featured on TV commercials ('I Wanna Be Your Man', 'What I Want', and 'Working for the Company') and video game soundtracks ('Railroad Track').

== Critical reception ==
Professional ratings
Aggregate scores
Source	Rating
Metacritic	68/100
Review scores
Source	Rating
AllMusic	3.5/5 stars
Drowned in Sound	6/10
The Guardian	3/5 stars
The Independent	4/5 stars
NME	2/5 stars
No Ripcord	6/10
PopMatters	7/10
Q	8/10
Rolling Stone	3/5 stars

Here's Willy Moon received generally favourable reviews from most music critics. At Metacritic, which assigns a normalised rating out of 100 to reviews from mainstream critics, the album received an average score of 68, based on 12 reviews.

Hugo Montgomery of The Independent wrote about the album overall: "It's gimmicky, sure, but also pretty irresistible: his rasping vocals hit all the right louche notes, and the sub-three-minute tunes have a short, sharp impact that justifies the support he's received from Jack White." AllMusic's Stephen Thomas Erlewine called the album "all gaudy glitz, a cheerful pantomime for an audience that may not even exist, as it's hard to discern what generation would swoon for these swinging, corny retro novelties", but later wrote about its appeal by concluding that "this is music that is out there, it is not cooked up by consultants and marketers, it's a truly, genuinely strange attempt at something new -- it may miss its mark but that's why it's fascinating. Plus, it's got a good beat and you can dance to it." Michael Hann of The Guardian commented on the record being a time machine to the '80s with its "rockabilly/technology fusion": "Here's Willy Moon sounds far less like a fusion of Elvis and urban than it does Sigue Sigue Sputnik and Westworld, who had exactly the same idea nearly 30 years ago."

== Commercial performance ==
Here's Willy Moon has sold 5,000 copies in the United States as of March 2015.

== Track listing ==
No.	Title	Length
1.	"Get Up (What You Need)"	3:17
2.	"Railroad Track"	2:25
3.	"Yeah Yeah"	2:44
4.	"What I Want"	2:06
5.	"Fire"	2:26
6.	"I Wanna Be Your Man"	1:51
7.	"Working for the Company"	2:40
8.	"Shakin'"	2:08
9.	"She Loves Me"	1:42
10.	"I Put a Spell on You"	2:08
11.	"My Girl"	2:53
12.	"Murder Ballad"	2:29

Deluxe edition bonus tracks
No.	Title	Length
13.	"Shakin' All Over"	2:29
14.	"Bang Bang"	2:17

US edition bonus tracks
No.	Title	Length
13.	"Oh Nikki Darling"	2:31
14.	"Shakin' All Over"	2:29
