= Inventing Myself (song) =

""Inventing Myself""

Single by Stan Walker

from the album Inventing Myself
- Released: 9 July 2013
- Genre: R&B
- Length: 3:58
- Label: Sony Music Australia
- Songwriter(s): Andy Macken · Thomas Macken

Stan Walker singles chronology
| "Bulletproof" (2013) | ""Inventing Myself"" (2013) | "Like It's Over" (2013) |

"Inventing Myself" is a single by recording artist Stan Walker from his fourth studio album Inventing Myself.

== Background and composition ==
"Inventing Myself" is a R&B ballad with funk-influenced horns. It was released as a single via music download by Sony Music Australia on 9 July 2013 in New Zealand.

== Reception ==
"Inventing Myself" debuted on the New Zealand Singles Chart at number 27 on 22 July 2013, but fell off the chart the next week.

== Chart performance ==
| Chart (2013) | Peak position |
|---|---|
| New Zealand (Recorded Music NZ) | 27 |
