= Faith Hope Love (EP) =

EP by Stan Walker
- Released: 31 May 2019
- Length: 14:49
- Label: Sony

Stan Walker chronology
Stan (2018)	Faith Hope Love (2019)	Impossible (Music by the Book) (2020)

Faith Hope Love is the second extended play (EP) by Australian-New Zealand recording artist Stan Walker. It was released in Australia and New Zealand on 31 May 2019 by Grace Promotions. The EP was dedicated to the victims of the Christchurch mosque shootings with proceeds from the sale of the EP to go to Muslim families affected by this event.

Walker said "My response to what happened to the Muslim community in Christchurch was this EP, Faith Hope Love. Have faith & stand strong. Hold onto hope & never let go of it. Choose love over everything." Stan said the song on the EP "all represent hope and love".

== Track listing ==
No.	Title	Length
1.	"Moemoeā" (featuring Seth Haapu)	3:31
2.	"Ultralight Beam"	3:26
3.	"Aotearoa (English version)" (featuring Ria Hall, Troy Kingi and Maisey Rika)	3:13
4.	"New Light"	4:39
Total length:		14:49

- "Moemoeā" is a Māori language version of the Crowded House song "Don't Dream It's Over".
- "Ultralight Beam" is a cover of the Kanye West song.
- "Aotearoa" is an English version of his 2014 single.
- "New Light" is a new recording.

== Release history ==
Region	Date	Format	Label
Australia/New Zealand	31 May 2019	digital download, streaming	Grace Promotions
