= You Never Know (Stan Walker song) =

Single by Stan Walker
- Released: 26 August 2016
- Genre: R&B, pop
- Length: 3:43
- Label: Sony Music Australia

Stan Walker singles chronology
"Start Again" (2015)	"You Never Know" (2016)	"Messages" (2017)

"You Never Know" is a single by recording artist Stan Walker. The song was released on 26 August 2016.

According to Walker the track has been a long time coming, telling MTV Australia in September 2016 "I've come out of a long creative and technical process with songs I really love and I can't wait to share them!"

A remix was released on 10 December 2016.

== Music video ==
The music video was released on 5 September 2016. It was directed by Shae Sterling, filmed in Los Angeles, choreographed by Kiel Tutin and features dancer Kaili Bright who has previously danced with Justin Bieber.

== Formats and track listings ==
- Digital download
1. "You Never Know" – 3:42
- Digital download (remix)
1. "You Never Know" – 3:26

== Charts ==
Chart (2016)	Peak position
Australia (ARIA)	86
