= Like It's Over =

""Like It's Over""

Single by Stan Walker featuring Ria Hall

from the album Inventing Myself
- Released: 4 October 2013
- Length: 3:33
- Label: Sony Music Australia
- Songwriter(s): Walker · Harder

Stan Walker singles chronology
"Inventing Myself" (2013)	""Like It's Over"" (2013)	"Holding You" (2014)

"Like It's Over" is a song by New Zealand-Australian recording artist Stan Walker from his fourth studio album Inventing Myself. It was released as the fourth single from the album and features fellow New Zealand recording artist Ria Hall.

== Release and reception ==
"Like It's Over" was released in New Zealand as a music download by Sony Music Australia on 4 October 2013. The song debuted on the New Zealand Singles Chart at number 23 on 14 October 2013, but fell off the chart the next week. It later re-entered the chart and peaked at number 19 on 4 November 2013. The song spent a total of nine weeks in the top 40 chart, and was eventually certified Gold by Recorded Music NZ for selling 7,500 copies.

== Music video ==
The music video for "Like It's Over" was filmed at Pt Erin Pool, Auckland and directed by Shae Sterling. It premiered on Stuff.co.nz on 7 November 2013.

== Charts ==
Chart (2013)	Peak position
New Zealand Singles Chart	19

== Certifications ==
Certifications and sales for "Like It's Over"
Region	Certification	Certified units/sales
New Zealand (RMNZ)	Gold	7,500^{*}
^{*} Sales figures based on certification alone.
