= Yeah Yeah (Willy Moon song) =

Single by Willy Moon

from the album Here's Willy Moon
- Released: 10 September 2012
- Recorded: 2012
- Genre: Alternative dance
- Length: 2:44
- Label: Island (UK) Interscope (US)
- Songwriter(s): Willy Moon, Robert Diggs, Clifford Smith
- Producer(s): Willy Moon

Willy Moon singles chronology
"Railroad Track" (2012)	"Yeah Yeah" (2012)	"My Girl" (2013)

"Yeah Yeah" is a song by New Zealand-born musician, singer and producer Willy Moon, initially released on 5 May 2012. The song peaked at number 26 on the UK Singles Chart and number 18 on the US Billboard Rock Chart.

The song samples Wu-Tang Clan's 1993 song "Wu-Tang Clan Ain't Nuthing ta Fuck Wit" from the rap group's debut album, Enter the Wu-Tang (36 Chambers).

The song was re-released on 10 September 2012 due to its use in Apple Inc's 2012 iPod lineup TV advertisement, including the 5th-Generation Touch, 7th-Generation Nano, and 4th-Generation Shuffle. It was also featured in the official soundtrack of the 2012 Xbox 360 game Forza Horizon, the trailer for the 2013 comedy film Last Vegas as well as in a 2016 Southwest Airlines commercial.

== Music video ==
The music video to accompany the release of "Yeah Yeah" was directed by Alex Cortes and debuted on YouTube on 31 October 2012.

== Remixes ==
"Yeah Yeah" has been remixed by Cedric Gervais, A1 Bassline, Sinden (DJ) and DJ Cable. There was also an "Urban" remix, which featured a guest verse from Wiley (also re-worked into DJ Cable's remix).

== Track listing ==
Digital download
No.	Title	Length
1.	"Yeah Yeah"	2:43

7" vinyl
No.	Title	Length
1.	"Yeah Yeah"	2:43
2.	"Yeah Yeah (Sinden Remix)"	2:43

== Chart performance ==
Chart (2012–13)	Peak position
Australia (ARIA)	61
France (SNEP)	175
Germany (GfK)	42
Japan (Japan Hot 100)	56
New Zealand (Recorded Music NZ)	28
Scotland (OCC)	30
UK Singles (OCC)	26
US Bubbling Under Hot 100 Singles (Billboard)	19
US Hot Rock & Alternative Songs (Billboard)	18
US Alternative Airplay (Billboard)	35
