= Bulletproof (Stan Walker song) =

Single by Stan Walker

from the album Inventing Myself
- Released: 31 May 2013
- Length: 3:37
- Label: Sony
- Songwriter(s): Stan Walker, Vince Harder, Lindsay Rimes

Stan Walker singles chronology
"Take It Easy" (2012)	"Bulletproof" (2013)	"Inventing Myself" (2013)

"Bulletproof" is a song by Australian-New Zealand recording artist Stan Walker from his fourth studio album, Inventing Myself (2013). It was released as the second single from the album by Sony Music Australia on 31 May 2013. "Bulletproof" peaked at number two on the New Zealand Singles Chart.

== Background ==
"Bulletproof" was written by Walker, Vince Harder and Lindsay Rimes. It was released as a single via digital download in New Zealand by Sony Music Australia on 31 May 2013.

== Chart performance ==
"Bulletproof" entered the New Zealand Singles Chart at number two on 10 June 2013; the following week, it moved to number six. The song spent fourteen weeks on the chart, seven of which it spent in the top ten. In the week of 15 July 2013, "Bulletproof" was certified gold by Recorded Music NZ for selling 7,500 copies, and in the week of 19 August 2013 was certified platinum, denoting 15,000 sales. It has since been certified double platinum.

== Live performances ==
Walker performed Bulletproof on season one of The X Factor New Zealand.

== Track listing ==
- Digital download
1. "Bulletproof" – 3:37

== Charts ==
=== Weekly charts ===
Chart (2013)	Peak position
New Zealand (Recorded Music NZ)	2

=== Year-end charts ===
Chart (2013)	Position
New Zealand (Recorded Music NZ)	42

== Certifications ==
Certifications and sales for "Bulletproof"
Region	Certification	Certified units/sales
New Zealand (RMNZ)	Platinum	15,000^{*}
^{*} Sales figures based on certification alone.

== Release history ==
Country	Date	Format	Label
New Zealand	31 May 2013	Digital download	Sony Music Australia
