= Music Won't Break Your Heart =

Single by Stan Walker

from the album Let the Music Play
- Released: 23 March 2012
- Recorded: Studios 301 (Sydney, New South Wales)
- Length: 3:20
- Label: Sony
- Songwriters: Stan Walker; Anthony Egizii; David Musumeci
- Producer: DNA Songs

Stan Walker singles chronology
| "Galaxy" (2011) | "Music Won't Break Your Heart" (2012) | "Waltzing Matilda" (2012) |

"Music Won't Break Your Heart" is a song by Australian-New Zealand recording artist Stan Walker, from his third studio album Let the Music Play (2011). It was released digitally on 23 March 2012 as the third single from the album. "Music Won't Break Your Heart" peaked at number 25 on the ARIA Singles Chart, and number 32 on the New Zealand Singles Chart.

== Background and reception ==
"Music Won't Break Your Heart" was written by Stan Walker with Anthony Egizii and David Musumeci of the production duo DNA Songs, who also handled the production. A digital EP, with three remixes of the song, was released in Australia on 23 March 2012. On 26 March 2012, "Music Won't Break Your Heart" debuted at number 80 on the ARIA Singles Chart, and peaked at number 25 on 9 April 2012. It was certified gold by the Australian Recording Industry Association (ARIA), denoting shipments of 35,000 copies. In New Zealand, the song debuted and peaked at number 32 on 2 April 2012, and stayed on the chart for three weeks.

== Music video ==
The accompanying music video for "Music Won't Break Your Heart" was directed by Benn Jae, and took five days to film in several locations on the South Island of New Zealand, including Invercargill, Kingston and Queenstown in February 2012. In an interview with The Southland Times, Walker said "We just wanted to show the real parts of New Zealand, the mountains, the journey, everything." The video premiered on Vevo on 6 March 2012.

== Track listing ==
- Digital EP
1. "Music Won't Break Your Heart" – 3:20
2. "Music Won't Break Your Heart" (7th Heaven Remix) – 6:19
3. "Music Won't Break Your Heart" (Nic M Remix) – 3:10
4. "Music Won't Break Your Heart" (Carl Remix) – 2:46

== Credits and personnel ==
Credits adapted from Let the Music Play liner notes.

- Anthony Egizii – songwriter, producer, programming and keys
- Damien Lewis – additional/assistant engineering
- David Musumeci – songwriter, producer
- Phil Tan – mixer
- Stan Walker – lead vocals, songwriter

== Charts ==
=== Weekly charts ===
| Chart (2012) | Peak position |
|---|---|
| ARIA Singles Chart | 25 |
| New Zealand Singles Chart | 32 |

=== Year-end chart ===
| Chart (2012) | Position |
|---|---|
| Australian Artist Singles Chart | 46 |

== Certifications ==
Certifications for "Music Won't Break Your Heart"
| Region | Certification | Certified units/sales |
|---|---|---|
| Australia (ARIA) | Gold | 35,000^{^} |
| New Zealand (RMNZ) | Gold | 7,500^{*} |
^{*} Sales figures based on certification alone.^{^} Shipments figures based on certification alone.
