= Stan (EP) =

EP by Stan Walker
- Released: 26 March 2018
- Genres: Soul; R&B; pop
- Length: 27:20
- Label: Sony

Stan Walker chronology
Truth & Soul (2015)	Stan (2018)	Faith Hope Love (2019)

Singles from Stan
- 1. "Thank You" Released: 26 March 2018; 2. "Find You" Released: 27 October 2018

Stan is the debut extended play by Australian-New Zealand recording artist Stan Walker. It was released in Australia and New Zealand on 26 March 2018 by Sony Music New Zealand. The EP provided two singles, "Thank You" (March 2018) and "Find You" (October).

== Background ==
Stan Walker explained the genesis of his six-track extended play. He described how, in September 2017, he underwent surgery to remove part of his stomach after discovering he had inherited a cancer-causing gene mutation, CDH1. In January 2018 a fan expressed concern for Walker's health after gaunt photos appeared on social media. A feature-length documentary, Stan, was released in New Zealand in March 2018.

Walker said "This EP has songs I've written 11 years ago, 5 years ago, 3 years ago and now. All these songs were written in break even times in my life. So I thought now would be a perfect time for them to be heard, alongside 1 of the biggest times of my life. This isn't really an indication of what's to come next, but these songs are for now."

== Track listing ==
No.	Title	Length
1.	"Thank You"	4:00
2.	"Love Hate"	3:27
3.	"You Don't Know Me"	3:30
4.	"Find You" (featuring Maisey Rika)	5:35
5.	"Whakamoemiti"	3:59
6.	"I Surrender"	6:49
Total length:		27:20

== Charts ==
Chart (2018)	Peak position
New Zealand Albums (RMNZ)	17

== Release history ==
Region	Date	Format	Label
Australia/New Zealand	26 March 2018	digital download, streaming	Sony Music New Zealand
