= Willy Moon =

New Zealand musician

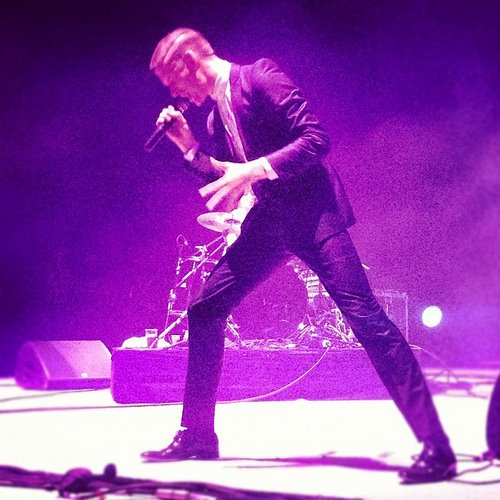
- Moon in 2012

Background information
- Born: William George Sinclair; 2 June 1989 (age 37); Wellington, New Zealand
- Genres: Alternative, indie pop
- Occupations: Singer, songwriter, producer
- Years active: 2010–present
- Labels: Island; Luv Luv Luv Records; Third Man
- Member of: Cruel Youth
- Spouse: Teddy Sinclair (m. 2014)
- Website: willymoon.com

William George Sinclair (born 2 June 1989), better known by his stage name Willy Moon, is a New Zealand singer, songwriter and producer. He is known for his 2012 single "Yeah Yeah", which appeared on the 2012 Apple iPod advert and peaked at number 26 on the UK Singles Chart. In March 2015, Moon and his wife, Natalia Kills, were fired as judges from The X Factor New Zealand for their harsh and offensive comments towards one of the contestants.

== Early life ==
Moon was born in Wellington, New Zealand. He left school when he was 16 and left New Zealand when he was 18. He spent time in Berlin before moving to London, United Kingdom. Since 2014, Moon has been living in New York City.

== Music career ==
=== 2010–2013: Willy Moon EP and Here's Willy Moon ===
In 2010, Moon released his first song "I Wanna Be Your Man" on Myspace, where he was first noticed and subsequently acquired a record deal with Island Records. He released his first two singles through Luv Luv Luv Records.

He received buzz for his off the wall approach to production, being named as a "One to Watch" by The Guardian and one of the "Faces of 2012" by Q magazine. He has also been featured in GQs "Most Stylish Men", one of Elle's "Bright Young Things" and profiled by Vogue.

His music is described as "a brilliantly odd fusion of 50s rock'n'roll and modern production" using "hip-hop production techniques". Moon's single "Yeah Yeah" was playlisted on BBC Radio 1 in early 2012. He and his band also performed live in session for Huw Stephens for BBC Radio 1 at Maida Vale Studios in May 2012. He also performed on the television show Later... with Jools Holland for the BBC in October 2012.

In July 2012, Moon released the singles "Railroad Track" and "Bang Bang" through Jack White's label Third Man Records. Moon's song "Yeah Yeah" was used in Apple Inc's 2012 iPod lineup TV advertisement, including the 5th-generation Touch, 7th-generation Nano, and 4th-generation Shuffle.

"Yeah Yeah" was also featured on the Sosh Orange 2012 advertisement that ran in France and as part of the Forza Horizon video game soundtrack. At part of his 2012/2013 US tour, Moon performed on the television show The Tonight Show with Jay Leno for NBC. In April 2013, Moon released his debut album, Here's Willy Moon. The album featured "Yeah Yeah", "Railroad Track" and "I Wanna Be Your Man". In August 2013, Rockstar Games included "Railroad Track" in the Grand Theft Auto V soundtrack list. Ubisoft also launched an Assassin's Creed IV: Black Flag trailer featuring "Railroad Track".

His tracks continue to be utilised in advertising, "Working for the Company" was used in the "Mr. Selfridge" advert in early 2014, "Yeah Yeah" features in a global Nissan Altima commercial and his cover of "Shakin" was the backing track to the Q1 Sky Atlantic UK television commercial.

=== 2016–present: Cruel Youth ===
In early 2016, Moon started a band, Cruel Youth, with his wife Kills. The band's first song, "Mr. Watson", was released on SoundCloud in February, followed by "Diamond Days" in April, which was also released on iTunes. Their third single, "Hatefuck", was released in early September, along with the release of their debut EP, +30mg, on 16 September 2016.

== Television career ==
=== 2015: X Factor New Zealand ===
In 2015, Moon was a judge and mentor on The X Factor New Zealand alongside his wife, Natalia Kills. Both Moon and Kills were fired following the first live screening for bullying and humiliating Joe Irvine, a contestant from the Over 25s. Moon compared Irvine to Norman Bates, and Kills accused him of copying Moon's look, due to wearing a suit and tie and having combed his hair. The comments led to widespread condemnation on social media, including a petition to have both Kills and Moon fired from the show, which reportedly received over 70,000 signatures within 24 hours. The show's sponsors, franchise owner and fellow judges also voiced public disapproval of the incident.

== Personal life ==
In May 2014, Moon married singer Natalia Kills in New York City. In May 2021, the couple lost their apartment along with all their belongings in a fire.

== Discography ==
=== Studio albums ===
Title	Album details	Peak chart positions					Sales
Title	Album details	NZ	BEL (Fl)	BEL (Wa)	FRA	UK	Sales
Here's Willy Moon	Released: 8 April 2013; Label: Island; Format: Digital download, CD	3	130	196	104	75	US: 5,000

=== Extended plays ===
Title	EP details
Willy Moon	Released: December 2012; Label: Island; Format: Digital download, CD

=== Singles ===
Year	Title	Peak chart positions				Album
Year	Title	NZ	FRA	GER	UK	Album
2011	"I Wanna Be Your Man"	—	—	—	—	Here's Willy Moon
2011	"She Loves Me"	—	—	—	—	Here's Willy Moon
2012	"Railroad Track"	—	—	—	—	Here's Willy Moon
2012	"Yeah Yeah"	28	175	42	26	Here's Willy Moon
2013	"My Girl"	—	—	—	—	Here's Willy Moon
2013	"Get Up (What You Need)"	—	—	—	—	Here's Willy Moon
"—" denotes single that did not chart or was not released.
