= Inventing Myself =

Studio album by Stan Walker
- Released: 25 October 2013
- Genre: Dance; R&B
- Length: 44:41
- Label: Sony

Stan Walker chronology
Let the Music Play (2011)	Inventing Myself (2013)	Truth & Soul (2015)

Singles from Inventing Myself
- 1. "Take It Easy" Released: 30 November 2012; 2. "Bulletproof" Released: 31 May 2013; 3. "Inventing Myself" Released: 9 July 2013; 4. "Like It's Over" Released: 4 October 2013

Inventing Myself is the fourth studio album by New Zealand recording artist Stan Walker. It was released on 25 October 2013, by Sony Music Australia. It is Walker's first album to be released exclusively in New Zealand. The album was preceded by the singles "Take It Easy", "Bulletproof" and "Inventing Myself".

== Background ==
Walker had been working on Inventing Myself for over two years and it is his first album he has worked on in New Zealand.

== Singles ==
"Take It Easy" was released as the album's first single on 30 November 2012. The song peaked at number five on the New Zealand Singles Chart and was certified double platinum for selling 30,000 copies. "Take It Easy" was also used in the New Zealand box office hit Mt Zion. "Bulletproof" was released as the second single from Inventing Myself on 31 May 2013; it reached number two in New Zealand and was certified platinum. "Inventing Myself" was released as the third single from the album on 9 July 2013. It debuted on the New Zealand Singles Chart at number 27 on 22 July 2013, but fell off the chart the next week. "Like It's Over" was released as the fourth single on 4 October 2013. It peaked at number 19 on 4 November 2013.

== Track listing ==
No.	Title	Writer(s)	Producer(s)	Length
1.	"Inventing Myself"	Andy Macken; Thomas Macken	Andy Mak	4:00
2.	"Bulletproof"	Stan Walker; Lindsay Rhimes; Vince Harder	Lindsay Rhimes	3:36
3.	"Find You"	Walker; Inoke Finau	Mister Watkins	4:06
4.	"Bully"	Walker; Stuart Crichton; Herbie Crichlow; Louis Schoorl	Stuart Crichton	4:00
5.	"Time To Save Our Love"	Walker; Robert Conley; Brian McFadden; Robert De Sa	Robert Conley; Robert De Sa	3:38
6.	"Runaway" (featuring Ruby Frost)	Jane de Jong; Sam de Jong	Sam de Jong	3:23
7.	"My Attention"	Walker; Gladius; Jupiter Project	Gladius; Jupiter Project	3:47
8.	"Love Immortal"	Walker; Iian Kidron; Crichton	Crichton	3:12
9.	"Hurricane"	Walker; Conley; McFadden; De Sa	Conley; De Sa	3:09
10.	"Like It's Over" (featuring Ria Hall)	Walker; Harder	Vince Harder	3:35
11.	"Take It Easy" (Radio Mix)	Walker; Anthony Egizii; David Musumeci	DNA Songs	3:11
12.	"Radio" (with Diafrix, Bonus Track)	Walker; Kaelyn Behr; Carl Dimataga; Khaled Abdulwahab; Mohamed Komba	Kaelyn Behr; Carl Dimataga	3:43
13.	"Take It Easy" (Bonus Track)	Walker; Egizii; Musumeci	Dimataga	3:21

== Personnel ==
Vocal credits

- Stan Walker – lead vocals
- Ruby Frost – featured artist
- Ria Hall – featured artist
- Diafrix – featured artist

== Charts ==
=== Weekly charts ===
Chart (2013)	Peak position
New Zealand Albums (RMNZ)	3

=== Year-end charts ===
Chart (2013)	Position
New Zealand Albums (RMNZ)	50

== Release history ==
Region	Date	Format	Label
New Zealand	25 October 2013	CD, digital download	Sony Music Australia
