= Take It Easy (Stan Walker song) =

Single by Stan Walker

from the album Mt. Zion and Inventing Myself
- Released: 30 November 2012
- Length: 3:20
- Label: Sony
- Songwriters: Anthony Egizii, David Musumeci, Stan Walker
- Producer: Carl Dimataga

Stan Walker singles chronology
"Waltzing Matilda" (2012)	"Take It Easy" (2012)	"Bulletproof" (2013)

"Take It Easy" is a song by Australian-New Zealand recording artist Stan Walker from the Mt. Zion film soundtrack (2013). It was released as the first single from the album by Sony Music Australia on 30 November 2012. "Take It Easy" peaked at number five on the New Zealand Singles Chart.

== Background ==
"Take It Easy" was released as a single via digital download in New Zealand by Sony Music Australia on 30 November 2012.

== Track listing ==
- Digital download.
1. "Take It Easy" – 3:20

== Charts ==
=== Weekly charts ===
Chart (2013)	Peak position
New Zealand (Recorded Music NZ)	5

=== Year-end charts ===
Chart (2013)	Position
New Zealand (Recorded Music NZ)	17

== Certifications ==
Region	Certification	Certified units/sales
New Zealand (RMNZ)	6× Platinum	180,000^{‡}
^{‡} Sales+streaming figures based on certification alone.

== Release history ==
Country	Date	Format	Label
New Zealand	30 November 2012	Digital download	Sony Music Australia
