= Mt. Zion (film) =

2013 New Zealand film

- Directed by: Tearepa Kahi
- Written by: Tearepa Kahi
- Produced by: Quinton Hita; Christina Milligan
- Starring: Stan Walker; David Wikaira-Paul; Darcey-Ray Flavell-Hudson; Temuera Morrison; Troy Kingi; Miriama Smith
- Cinematography: Fred Renata
- Edited by: Paul Maxwell
- Music by: Shane McLean; Te Arepa Kahi; Stan Walker
- Production company: Small Axe Films
- Distributed by: 20th Century Fox
- Release date: 6 February 2013
- Countries: New Zealand; Australia
- Languages: Māori; English
- Box office: $1.6 million

Mt. Zion is a 2013 New Zealand film written and directed by Tearepa Kahi, starring Stan Walker and Temuera Morrison. This film marks the acting debut for singer Stan Walker. The world premiere of the film was held at the Event Cinema at Manukau on 4 February 2013.

== Plot ==
Turei's family are hard-working potato farm workers in rural New Zealand. A talented musician, Turei dreams of his band being the support act for Bob Marley's 1979 tour. But it's a dream that challenges the traditions and values of his upbringing and will set him at odds with his family – particularly his father, a true man of the land.

== Cast ==
- Stan Walker as Turei
- Temuera Morrison as Dad
- Miriama Smith as Layla
- Darcy Ray Flavell-Hudson
- Will Hall
- Kevin Kaukau as Booker
- Troy Kingi
- Graham Ryan
- David Wikaira-Paul

== Production ==
The movie was filmed in Pukekohe.

== Reception ==
Russell Baillie from New Zealand Herald gave the film 4/5 saying it is a smart, finely-observed, heartfelt drama of good humour and decent tunes against an authentic local setting. Jake Wilson from Sydney Morning Herald gave it 1 1/2 stars saying the film doesn't have the charm or skill for a big feelgood success and 'Walker only relaxes when he sings'.

== Soundtrack ==
The soundtrack was released on 15 March 2013.

Also included on the album are six original recordings from Small Axe (the fictional band depicted in the film), a host of reggae classics from 10cc, Peter Tosh, Third World, Jimmy Cliff, Toots and the Maytals, as well as hits from iconic Kiwi artists Prince Tui Teka, Max Merritt & The Meteors, and Herbs.

=== Track listing ===
1. "Take It Easy" – Stan Walker
2. "Mt Zion" – Small Axe
3. "Heat Wave" – Small Axe
4. "Dreadlock Holiday" – 10cc
5. "(You Gotta Walk) Don't Look Back" – Peter Tosh
6. "Now That We Found Love" – Third World
7. "The Harder They Come" – Jimmy Cliff
8. "Funky Kingston" – Toots and the Maytals
9. "Marcus Garvey" – Burning Spear
10. "I Can See Clearly Now" – Johnny Nash
11. "Hoki Mai" – Prince Tui Teka
12. "Soul Deep" – Small Axe
13. "Lion Trail" – Small Axe featuring Troy Kingi
14. "Maunga Hiona" – Small Axe featuring Che-fu
15. "Azania (Soon Come)" – Herbs
16. "I Need Your Love" – Golden Harvest
17. "Slippin' Away" – Max Merritt & The Meteors
18. "Army" – Small Axe
19. "Basket" – Small Axe

== Weekly charts ==
In New Zealand the album debuted at #11, before peaking at #1 on 18 February 2013.

Chart (2013)	Peak position
New Zealand Singles Chart	1
