= Stan Walker =

Australian-born New Zealand singer

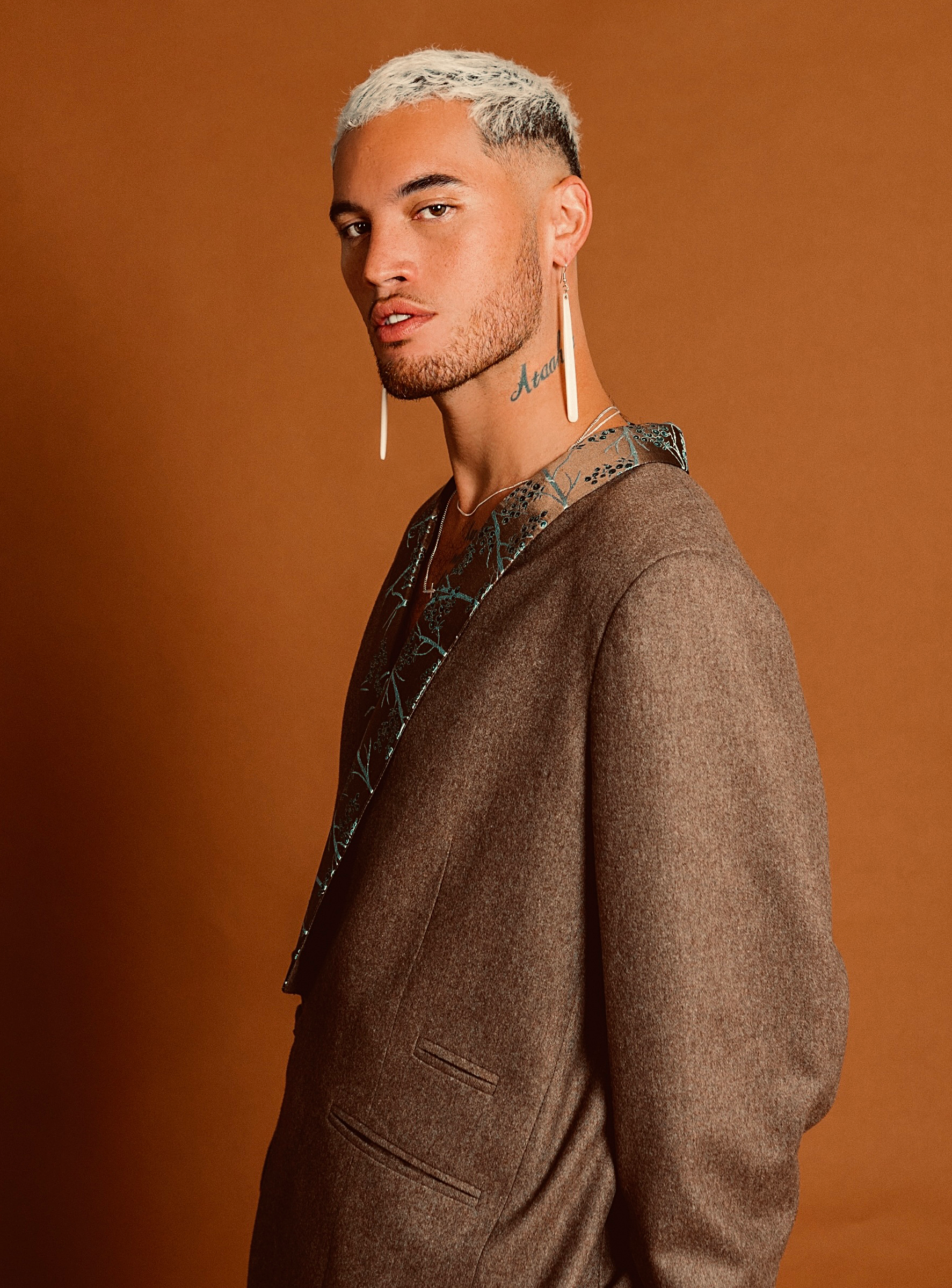
- Stan Walker in August 2021

Background information
- Born: 23 October 1990 (age 36); Melbourne, Victoria, Australia
- Genres: Pop; R&B
- Occupations: Singer, actor, television personality
- Instruments: Vocals, guitar
- Years active: 2009–present
- Label: Sony Music Australia
- Website: stanwalker.com.au

Stan Roto Walker (born 23 October 1990) is an Australian-New Zealand singer, actor, and television personality. In 2009, Walker was the winner of the seventh season of Australian Idol. He subsequently signed a recording contract with Sony Music Australia. It was in December 2009, Walker released his debut studio album, Introducing Stan Walker, which included the hit single, "Black Box". The album debuted at number three on the Australian ARIA Albums Chart and was certified platinum by the Australian Recording Industry Association (ARIA). It also appeared on the New Zealand Albums Chart at number two and was certified triple platinum by the Recording Industry Association of New Zealand (RIANZ).

In 2010, Walker released his second studio album, From the Inside Out, which spawned the hit singles, "Unbroken" and "Choose You". The album debuted at number one on the New Zealand Albums Chart and number two on the ARIA Albums Chart. In November 2011, Walker released his third studio album, Let the Music Play, which debuted at number 18 on the ARIA Albums Chart and number 12 in New Zealand, and spawned the hit single "Loud". During his career, Walker has won five New Zealand Music Awards and has received five ARIA Music Award nominations. Walker was a judge on the first and second season of The X Factor NZ in 2013 and 2015. He made his acting debut in the New Zealand film, Mt Zion (2013), and played the role of Benjy in the 2015 New Zealand film, Born to Dance. Walker's sixth studio album, Te Arohanui was released on 17 September 2021 and was his first in te reo Māori.

== Life and career ==
=== Early life (1990–2009) ===
Stan Walker's parents are Ross and April Walker; he is the nephew of Tūhoe artist and activist Tāme Iti, and grand-nephew of singer Whirimako Black. He is Māori, of Tūhoe, Ngāi Te Rangi and Ngāti Porou descent. Walker grew up on a marae in Mount Maunganui, New Zealand. There he attended Fairfield Intermediate and Hamilton Boys' High School in Hamilton, and boarded at New Plymouth Boys' High School.

Walker has compared his early life to that portrayed in the 1994 New Zealand film, Once Were Warriors, which tells the story of an urban Māori family and their problems with poverty, alcoholism and domestic violence. His father was repeatedly jailed for beating his wife, April, and five children, including him. This led to Walker smoking marijuana and thieving. He was also sexually abused by a relative over a nine-month period. His parents were drug dealers and both have spent time in jail for drug offences.

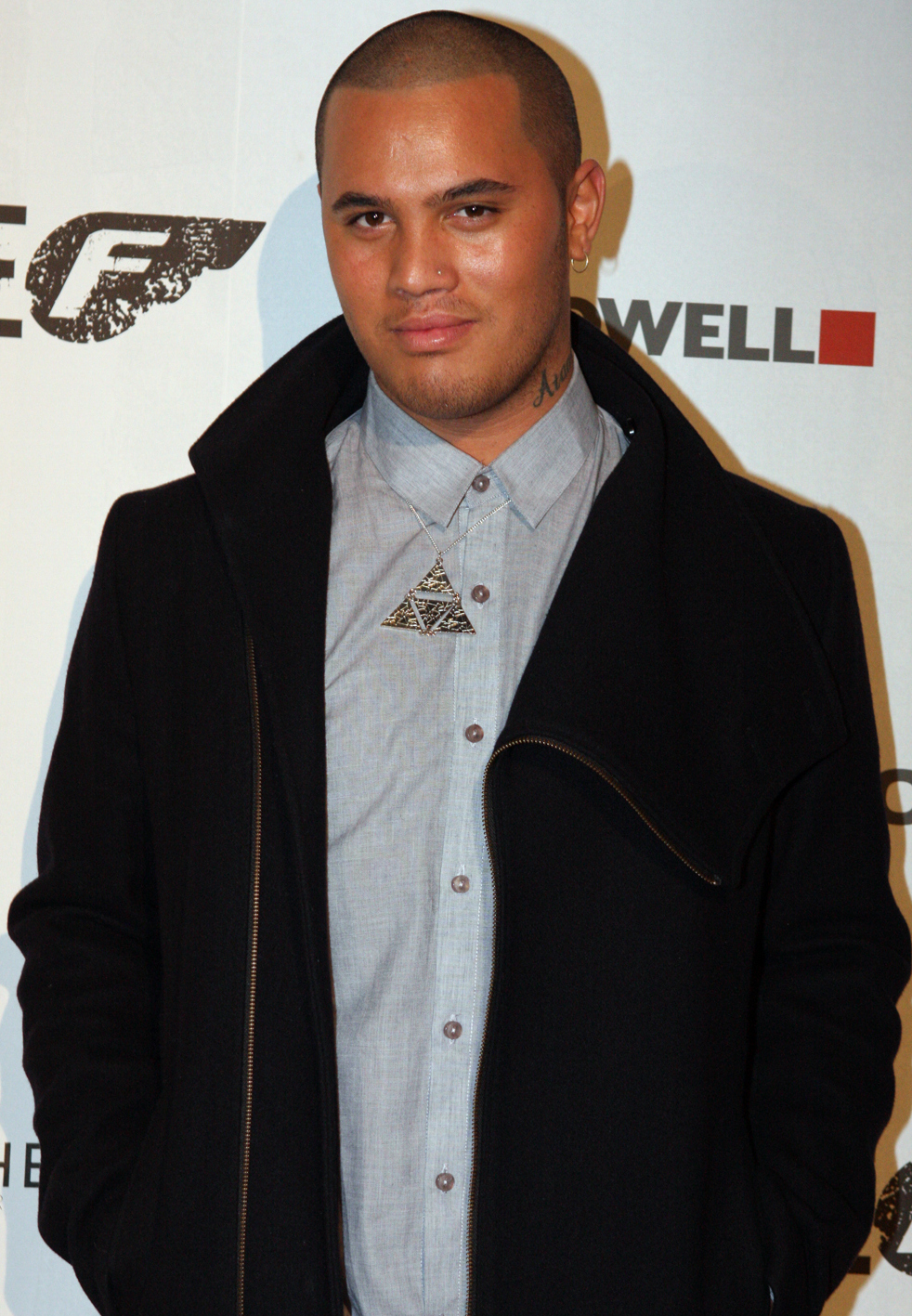
Walker in 2013

At the age of 15, Walker started going to church, after hearing a testimony of a girl who had a similar family background to his. Walker says his passion for music and church made him a "good boy" again. After several violent episodes, Walker and his family moved back to Australia and settled in Coolangatta, Queensland. In 2009, Walker lost a daughter when his then-girlfriend suffered a miscarriage. He had planned to call his baby, Ataahua, which is Māori for "beautiful", and wears her name as a tattoo on his neck. Before Walker had entered Australian Idol, he was a shop assistant at a menswear shop in Coolangatta.

Walker says that moving to Australia helped him pursue a career in entertainment.

=== 2009: Australian Idol and Introducing Stan Walker ===
In 2009, Walker auditioned for the seventh season of Australian Idol, singing John Legend's "Ordinary People" at his Brisbane audition. He received praise from the judges and progressed through to the theatre rounds receiving more recognition from the judges, with Kyle Sandilands saying, "You are the only person after the audition that I ever told anyone about family, friends other people that I run into. I only told them about you." After all three theatre rounds were over, it was announced that Walker had made it into the top twenty four semi-finals. Walker was a part of the first group to perform in the semi-finals. The following evening, it was announced that the first two contestants to be put through to the final top twelve according to viewer votes, were Walker and fellow contestant Kate Cook.

Throughout the season, Walker was praised continually for his voice and for the daring song choices he took with his performances. One of his most highly praised performances on the show was of the Prince song, "Purple Rain", which received a standing ovation from the judging panel and the audience. The grand final was held on 22 November 2009 at the Sydney Opera House. After the viewer votes had been tallied, it was announced that the winner was Walker. He is the first person of New Zealand descent to win Australian Idol. After coming out of Australian Idol as the winner, Walker signed to Sony Music Australia and received an artist's development fund worth $200,000. During this time, he established his own company called, Stan Walker Music Pty Ltd, which is run by his mother, April. The company was set up in order to negotiate his contract with Sony Music and not end up like past Australian Idol contestant Damien Leith, who claimed he did not make any money from his Winners Journey release.

Walker's debut single, "Black Box", was released digitally following his win on Australian Idol on 22 November. The song peaked at number two on the ARIA Singles Chart and was certified double platinum by the Australian Recording Industry Association (ARIA), for selling 140,000 copies. It also peaked at number one on the New Zealand Singles Chart and was certified double platinum by the Recording Industry Association of New Zealand (RIANZ), for selling 30,000 copies. Walker's debut studio album, Introducing Stan Walker, was released on 8 December 2009, three days ahead of its original release date. The album featured the selected songs Walker had performed as part of the top twelve on Australian Idol, as well the two original songs, "Black Box" and "Think of Me", which was produced by the first Australian Idol winner, Guy Sebastian. Introducing Stan Walker debuted at number three on the ARIA Albums Chart and was certified platinum by ARIA. It also made its debut on the New Zealand Albums Chart at number two and was certified triple platinum by the RIANZ, for selling 45,000 copies.

=== 2010–2012: From the Inside Out and Let the Music Play ===
In April 2010, Walker flew to Haiti to help Compassion Australia's relief effort of the 2010 Haiti earthquake as an ambassador. Walker's second studio album, From the Inside Out, was released on 20 August 2010. The album debuted at number two on the ARIA Albums Chart. In New Zealand, it debuted at number one on the New Zealand Albums Chart, and became Walker's first number-one album in the country. Eventually, From the Inside Out was certified platinum by the RIANZ. "Unbroken" was released as the album's lead single on 12 April 2010. On the New Zealand Singles Chart, the song peaked at number nine and was certified gold. In Australia, "Unbroken" peaked at number 23 on the ARIA Singles Chart and was certified gold. In June 2010, Walker featured on New Zealand rapper Young Sid's single, "Stuck in a Box". The album's second single, "Choose You", was released on 20 July 2010. The song peaked at number three on the New Zealand Singles Chart and was certified platinum. It also appeared on the ARIA Singles Chart at number 16 and was certified platinum. "Homesick", featuring rapper Kayo, was released as the album's third and final single on 29 October. It peaked at number 21 on the New Zealand Singles Chart and was certified gold. This single did not chart in Australia.

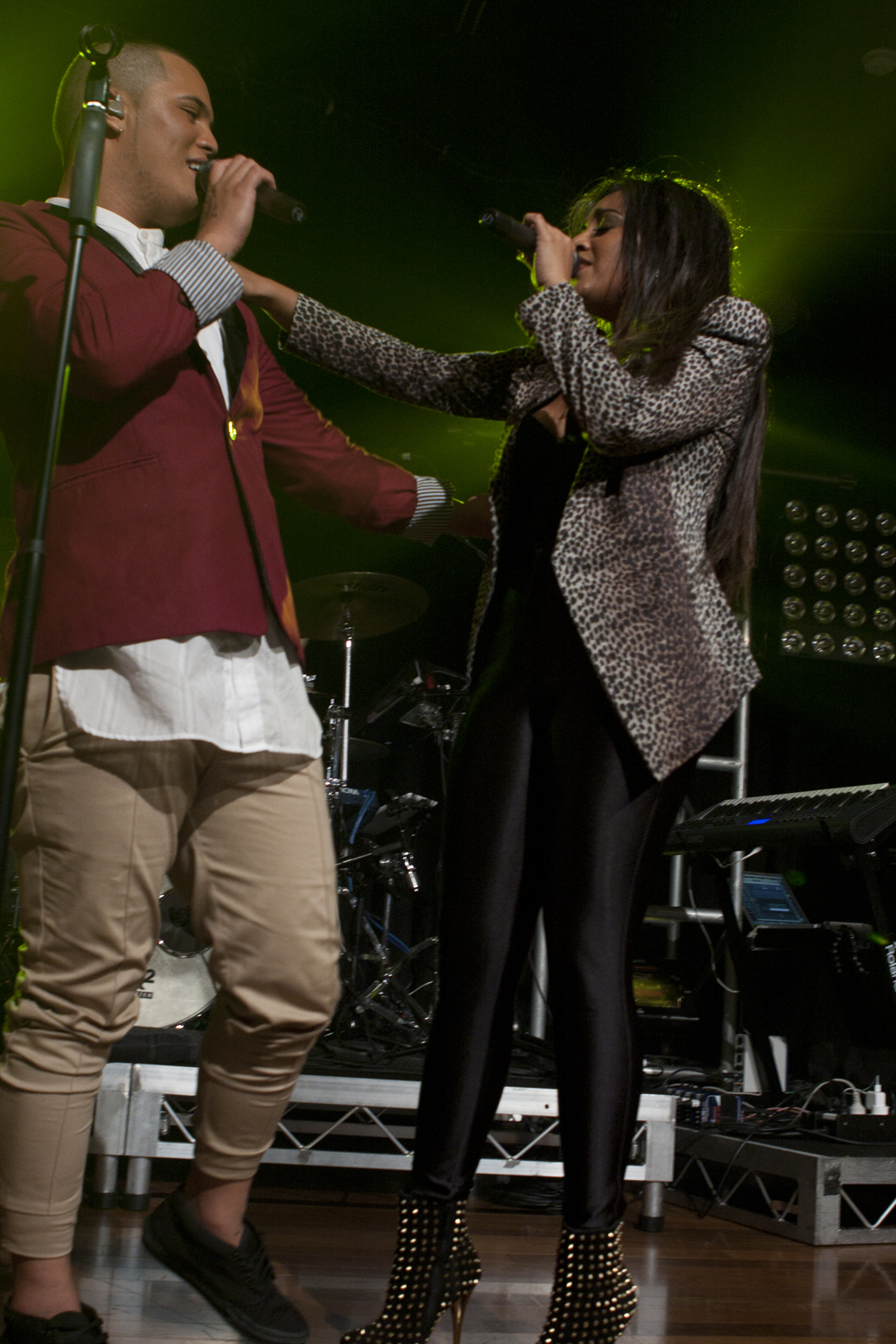
Walker and Jessica Mauboy performing during the Galaxy Tour in January 2012.

In November 2010, Walker served as a support act for the Summerbeatz tour in Australia, touring alongside Flo Rida, Jay Sean, Akon and Ciara, among other artists. He performed at the Parachute music festival in January 2011. In February 2011, Walker held his first headlining tour in New Zealand.

Walker's third studio album, Let the Music Play, was released on 18 November 2011. It debuted at number 18 on the ARIA Album Chart and number 12 on the New Zealand Albums Chart. Its lead single, "Loud", was released on 2 May 2011. The song peaked at number nine on the ARIA Singles Chart and was certified platinum. On the New Zealand Singles Chart, "Loud" peaked at number eight and was certified gold. The album's second single, "Light It Up", featuring Static Revenger, was released on 16 September 2011. The song peaked at number 23 on the New Zealand Singles Chart and has reached number 45 on the ARIA Singles Chart. In October 2011, Walker was featured on Jessica Mauboy's single, "Galaxy", which peaked at number 13 on the ARIA Singles Chart. Walker and Mauboy embarked on their Galaxy Tour across Australia in January 2012, to celebrate the release of the song. The tour ended in February 2012.

In March 2012, "Music Won't Break Your Heart" was released as the third single from Let the Music Play and it peaked at number 25 in Australia and number 32 in New Zealand. In May 2012, Walker became a supporting act for Nicki Minaj on the Australian leg of her Pink Friday Tour.

=== 2013–2016: The X Factor, acting debut, Inventing Myself and Truth & Soul ===
On 6 November 2012, it was announced that Walker would be a judge on the first season of the New Zealand version of The X Factor in 2013. Walker made his acting debut playing the lead role of Turei in the New Zealand film, Mt Zion, about a young Māori musician who seeks to open for Bob Marley's 1979 Auckland show, but his dream clashes with his family's ideals. When speaking of his role in the film, Walker told Herald Sun, "They approached me ... the script is so good, it's basically who I was six years ago ... It's definitely the main reason I wanted to get involved.". The film was released on 6 February 2013. Walker recorded "Take It Easy" for the film's soundtrack; the song was released as a single in December 2012 and was also included in Walker's greatest hits album, The Complete Collection.

Walker opened for Beyoncé's The Mrs. Carter Show World Tour in October 2013 for the Auckland and Perth concerts and three of the four Sydney concerts, following Iggy Azalea pulling out of these dates. Walker's fourth studio album, Inventing Myself, was released on 25 October 2013. In August 2014, Walker featured with other New Zealand artists on the charity single "Song for Everyone". His fifth studio album Truth & Soul, featuring a collection of soul covers, was released in Australia on 17 April 2015.

Walker returned to The X Factor NZ in 2015 alongside returning judge Melanie Blatt and new judges Natalia Kills and Willy Moon. Following the first night of live shows both Kills and Moon were fired from the panel following rude comments made to a contestant and were replaced by Natalie Bassingthwaite and Shelton Woolwright. Walker placed runner-up with his contestant Nyssa Collins.

In 2015, he appeared with rugby player Israel Dagg and actor Rip Torn in a Men In Black themed safety ad for Air New Zealand.

=== 2017–2019: Stomach cancer, Stan & Faith Hope Love ===
In January 2018, fans of Walker expressed concern for his health after gaunt photos appeared on social media. In March, it was announced Walker had his stomach removed in September 2017 after discovering he inherited a rare cancer-causing gene mutation called CDH1 that has been responsible for the deaths of more than 25 of his family members. Walker said "The past nine months have been a life changing journey full of ups & downs to say the least, [but] all I'm gonna say is that I'm blessed to be alive and well." A feature-length documentary titled Stan was released in March 2018.

On 26 March 2018, Walker released a 6-track self-titled EP. Upon its release, Walker said "This EP has songs I've written 11 years ago, 5 years ago, 3 years ago & now. All these songs were written in break even times in my life." On 7 December 2018, Walker released "Gimme Your Love" alongside the video which features a fly on-the-wall insight into Stan's National 2018 tour.

In May 2019, Walker released Faith Hope Love, an EP dedicated to the victims of the Christchurch mosque shootings.

=== 2020-present: Impossible: My Story, Te Arohanui & All In ===
In 2020, Walker began releasing new singles weekly, commencing with "Mexico" on 21 February 2020.

In October 2020, Walker released an autobiography titled Impossible: My Story. A compilation album was released to coincide with the album, titled Impossible (Music by the Book). The album peaked at number 22 on the New Zealand chart.

In November 2020 he was named one of the best dressed men in show business on David Hartnell MNZM's Best Dressed List.

In August 2021, Walker released "Don't Worry Baby" with Australian singer Celina Sharma, the lead single from his then-forthcoming seventh studio album All In. Walker said "This whole album, if I can say anything, is all soul and R&B. The seasons of my life over the last four years; love, heartbreak, time of change, racism, mental health, everything."

On 7 September 2021, Walker announced the release of a Māori language studio album Te Arohanui for release on 17 September.

In August 2022, Walker released his seventh studio album, All In.

In November 2022, Walker released the Christmas single "Favourite Part About Christmas".

In November 2023, Walker released the single "I Am", from the soundtrack for the film Origin.

On 22 February 2024, Walker premiered the single "Māori ki te Ao", sung in te reo Māori.

== Musical style and inspiration ==
Walker cites Beyoncé as a main inspiration; "She's musically why I do what I do." According to Jason Birchmeier of Allmusic, Walker sings predominantly pop music "with an R&B style". Walker's second album, From the Inside Out, drew from pop, R&B and hip hop, with elements of electro, glam metal, pop-rap and funk also present. He describes his third album, the more pop and dance-oriented Let the Music Play, as thematically his most personal. "These are my songs, my stories, my tunes, my melodies, my words, me."

== Discography ==
- Introducing Stan Walker (2009)
- From the Inside Out (2010)
- Let the Music Play (2011)
- Inventing Myself (2013)
- Truth & Soul (2015)
- Te Arohanui (2021)
- All In (2022)

== Tours ==
Headlining

- 2011: New Zealand Summer Tour
- 2012: Galaxy Tour (with Jessica Mauboy)
- 2013: World Tour of New Zealand
- 2018: New Take Over Tour
- 2021: All In Tour

Supporting act

- 2010: Summerbeatz
- 2012: Pink Friday Tour (supporting Nicki Minaj)
- 2013: The Mrs. Carter Show World Tour (supporting Beyoncé)

== Filmography ==
Television and films
| Year | Title | Role | Notes |
|---|---|---|---|
| 2013–2015 | The X Factor New Zealand | Himself | TV series judge/mentor |
| 2013 | Mt Zion | Turei | |
| 2015 | Born to Dance | Benjy | |
| 2016 | Hunt for the Wilderpeople | Ron | |
| 2017 | The Stolen | Matai | |
| 2018 | Chasing Comets | Rhys Stewart | |
| 2024 | Tomb Raider: The Legend of Lara Croft | Leo (voice) | 2 episodes |
| TBA | The Circus Heist | | Upcoming Film |

== Awards and nominations ==
| Year | Type | Award | Result | Ref. |
|---|---|---|---|---|
| 2010 | Waiata Māori Awards | Radio Airplay Record of the Year | Won | |
| 2010 | Nickelodeon Australian Kids Choice Awards | Fresh Aussie Musos | Nominated | |
| 2010 | New Zealand Music Awards | Vodafone Peoples' Choice | Won | |
| 2010 | New Zealand Music Awards | Highest Selling New Zealand Single – "Black Box" | Won | |
| 2010 | New Zealand Music Awards | Radio Airplay Record of the Year – "Black Box" | Won | |
| 2010 | New Zealand Music Awards | International Achievement Award | Won | |
| 2010 | ARIA Music Awards | Most Popular Australian Album – Introducing... Stan Walker) | Nominated | |
| 2010 | ARIA Music Awards | Most Popular Australian Single – "Black Box" | Nominated | |
| 2010 | ARIA Music Awards | Most Popular Australian Artist | Nominated | |
| 2011 | Nickelodeon Australian Kids Choice Awards | Fave Song – "Loud" | Nominated | |
| 2011 | New Zealand Music Awards | Best Male Solo Artist (From the Inside Out) | Nominated | |
| 2011 | New Zealand Music Awards | Vodafone Peoples' Choice | Nominated | |
| 2011 | New Zealand Music Awards | Radio Airplay Record of the Year – "Choose You" | Won | |
| 2011 | ARIA Music Awards | Most Popular Australian Artist | Nominated | |
| 2011 | Channel [V] Awards | Channel V Oz Artist of the Year | Nominated | |
| 2011 | Poprepublic.tv IT List Awards | Single of 2011 – "Galaxy" (with Jessica Mauboy) | Nominated | |
| 2011 | Poprepublic.tv IT List Awards | Australian Male Artist | Nominated | |
| 2012 | Deadly Awards | Single of the Year – "Galaxy" (with Jessica Mauboy) | Won | |
| 2012 | ARIA Music Awards | Song of the Year – "Galaxy" (with Jessica Mauboy) | Nominated | |
| 2012 | Channel [V] Awards | Channel V Oz Artist of the Year | Nominated | |
| 2012 | New Zealand Music Awards | Vodafone Peoples' Choice | Nominated | |
| 2012 | New Zealand Music Awards | Radio Airplay Record of the Year – "Light It Up" | Nominated | |
| 2012 | Poprepublic.tv IT List Awards | Favourite Australian Male Artist | Nominated | |
| 2013 | Poprepublic.tv Awards | Favourite Australian Male Artist | Nominated | |
| 2013 | New Zealand Music Awards | People's Choice | Nominated | |
| 2013 | New Zealand Music Awards | Radio Airplay Record of the Year – "Take It Easy" | Won | |
| 2013 | New Zealand Music Awards | Highest Selling Single – "Take It Easy" | Nominated | |
| 2013 | New Zealand Music Awards | Single of the Year – "Take It Easy" | Nominated | |
| 2014 | World Music Awards | World's Best Song (The Complete Collection) | Nominated | |
| 2014 | World Music Awards | World's Best Video (The Complete Collection) | Nominated | |
| 2014 | New Zealand Music Awards | Best Male Solo Artist | Nominated | |
| 2014 | New Zealand Music Awards | Radio Airplay Record of the Year – "Bulletproof | Won | |
| 2014 | New Zealand Music Awards | Best Pop Artist | Nominated | |
| 2015 | New Zealand Music Awards | People's Choice | Nominated | |
| 2015 | New Zealand Music Awards | Best Male Artist | Nominated | |
| 2020 | Aotearoa Music Awards | Best Māori Artist | Nominated | |
| 2020 | Aotearoa Music Awards | Best Soul/R&B Artist | Nominated | |
| 2022 | Aotearoa Music Awards | Best Māori Artist | Nominated | |
| 2024 | Aotearoa Music Awards | Te Manu Mātārae | Won | |
| 2024 | Aotearoa Music Awards | Single of the Year – "I AM" | Nominated | |
| 2024 | Aotearoa Music Awards | Album of the Year – All In | Nominated | |
| 2024 | Aotearoa Music Awards | Best Solo Artist | Nominated | |
| 2024 | Aotearoa Music Awards | People's Choice | Nominated | |
| 2024 | Aotearoa Music Awards | Best Māori Artist | Nominated | |
| 2024 | Aotearoa Music Awards | Mana Reo | Nominated | |
| 2025 | Aotearoa Music Awards | Best Māori Artist | Won | |
| 2025 | Aotearoa Music Awards | Mana Reo | Won | |
| 2025 | Aotearoa Music Awards | Single of the Year – "Māori Ki Te Ao" | Nominated | |
| 2025 | Aotearoa Music Awards | Best Solo Artist | Nominated | |
| 2025 | Aotearoa Music Awards | People's Choice | Nominated | |
| 2025 | Aotearoa Music Awards | Best Soul/R&B Artist | Nominated | |

| Preceded by Wes Carr | Australian Idol; Winner; Season 7 (2009) | Succeeded by Royston Sagigi-Baira |
