= Glucoside =

Glycoside that is derived from glucose

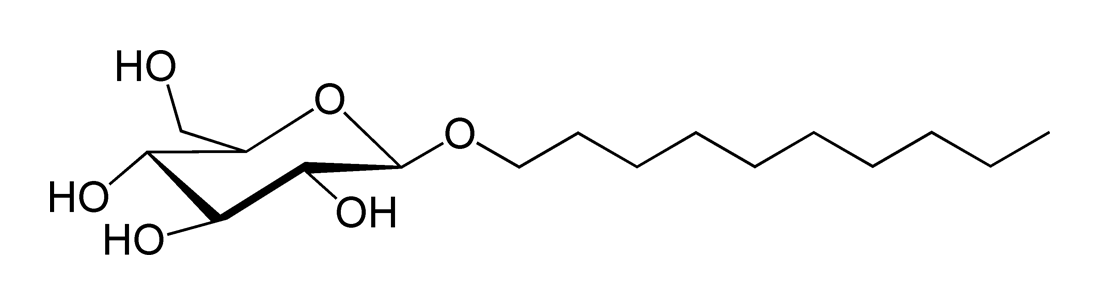
Chemical structure of decyl glucoside, a plant-derived glucoside used as a surfactant.

A glucoside is a glycoside that is chemically derived from glucose. Glucosides are common in plants, but rare in animals. Glucose is produced when a glucoside is hydrolysed by purely chemical means, or decomposed by fermentation or enzymes.

The name was originally given to plant products of this nature, in which the other part of the molecule was, in the greater number of cases, an aromatic aldehydic or phenolic compound (exceptions are Jinigrin and Jalapin or Scammonin). It has now been extended to include synthetic ethers, such as those obtained by acting on alcoholic glucose solutions with hydrochloric acid, and also the polysaccharoses, e.g. cane sugar, which appear to be ethers also. Although glucose is the most common sugar present in glucosides, many are known which yield rhamnose or iso-dulcite; these may be termed pentosides. Much attention has been given to the non-sugar parts (aglycone) of the molecules; the constitutions of many have been determined, and the compounds synthesized; and in some cases the preparation of the synthetic glucoside effected.

The simplest glucosides are the alkyl ethers which have been obtained by reacting hydrochloric acid on alcoholic glucose solutions. A better method of preparation is to dissolve solid anhydrous glucose in methanol containing hydrochloric acid. A mixture of alpha- and beta-methylglucoside results.

The classification of glucosides is a matter of some intricacy. One method based on the chemical constitution of the non-glucose part of the molecules has been proposed that posits four groups: (1) alkyl derivatives, (2) benzene derivatives, (3) styrolene derivatives, and (4) anthracene derivatives. A group may also be constructed to include the cyanogenic glucosides, i.e. those containing prussic acid. Alternate classifications follow a botanical classification, which has several advantages; in particular, plants of allied genera contain similar compounds. This article follows the chemical classification and discusses only the more important compounds.

== Ethylene derivatives ==
These are generally mustard oils, which are characterized by a burning taste; their principal occurrence is in mustard and Tropaeolum seeds. Sinigrin, or the potassium salt of inyronic acid not only occurs in mustard seed, but also in black pepper and in horseradish root. Hydrolysis with barium hydroxide, or decomposition by the ferment myrosin, gives glucose, allyl mustard oil and potassium hydroxide. Sinalbin occurs in white pepper; it decomposes to the mustard oil, glucose and sinapin, a compound of choline and sinapic acid. Jalapin or Scammonin occurs in scammony; it hydrolyses to glucose and jalapinolic acid.

== Benzene derivatives ==
These are generally oxy and oxyaldehydic compounds.

Benzoic acid derivatives

The benzoyl derivative cellotropin has been used for tuberculosis. Populin, which occurs in the leaves and bark of Populus tremula, is benzoyl salicin. Benzoyl-beta-D-glucoside is a compound found in the fern Pteris ensiformis.

Phenol derivatives

There are a number of glucosides found in natural phenols and polyphenols, as, for example, in the flavonoids chemical family. Arbutin, which occurs in bearberry along with methyl arbutin, hydrolyses to hydroquinone and glucose. Pharmacologically it acts as a urinary antiseptic and diuretic; Salicin, also termed Saligenin and glucose occurs in the willow. The enzymes ptyalin and emulsin convert it into glucose and saligenin, ortho-oxybenzylalcohol. Oxidation gives the aldehyde helicin.

== Styrene derivatives ==
This group contains a benzene and also an ethylene group, being derived from styrene. Coniferin (C_{16}H_{22}O_{8}) occurs in the cambium of conifer wood. Emulsin converts it into glucose and coniferyl alcohol. Oxidation of coniferin gives glucovanillin, which yields upon treatment with emulsin glucose and vanillin. Syringin, which occurs in the bark of Syringa vulgaris, is a methoxyconiferin. Phloridzin occurs in the root-bark of various fruit trees; it hydrolyses to glucose and phloretin, which is the phloroglucin ester of paraoxyhydratropic acid. It is related to the pentosides naringin (C_{27}H_{32}O_{14}), which hydrolyzes to rhamnose and naringenin, the phloroglucin ester of p-coumaric acid, and hesperidin, which hydrolyzes to rhamnose and hesperetin, the phloroglucin ester of isoferulic acid (C_{10}H_{10}O_{4}).

- Aesculin (C_{21}H_{24}O_{13}), occurring in horse-chestnut and California buckeye, and daphnin, occurring in Daphne alpina, are isomeric; the former hydrolyzes to glucose and aesculetin (C_{9}H_{6}O_{4} — 6,7-dihydroxycoumarin), the latter to glucose and daphnetin (7,8-dihydroxycoumarin).
- Fraxin, occurring in Fraxinus excelsior, hydrolyzes to glucose and fraxetin (also known as 7,8-dihydroxy-6-methoxycoumarin)
- Flavone or benzo-7-pyrone derivatives are numerous; in many cases they (or the non-sugar part of the molecule) are vegetable dyes.
- Rhamnetin, a splitting product of the glucosides of Rhamnus, is monomethyl quercetin; fisetin, from Rhus cotinus, is monoxyquercetin; chrysin is phenyl-dihydroxybenzopyrone.
- Saponarin, a glucoside found in Saponaria officinalis, is a related compound.
- Strophanthin is the name given to two different compounds, g-strophanthin (ouabain) obtained from Strophanthus gratus and k-strophanthin from Stroph. kombé.

== Anthracene derivatives ==
These are generally substituted anthraquinones; many have medicinal applications, being used as purgatives, while one, ruberythric acid, yields the valuable dyestuff madder, the base of which is alizarin. Chrysophanic acid, a dioxymethylanthraquinone, occurs in rhubarb, which also contains emodin, a trioxymethylanthraquinone; this substance occurs in combination with rhamnose in Frangula bark. A recent study suggests, that purified anthraquinone glycosides from rhubarb could be a potential therapeutic avenue to treat type 2 diabetes mellitus by modulating the gut microbiota and reducing systematic inflammation.

Arguably the most important cyanogenic glucoside is amygdalin, which occurs in bitter almonds. The enzyme maltase decomposes it into glucose and mandelic nitrile glucoside; the latter is broken down by emulsin into glucose, benzaldehyde and prussic acid. Emulsin also decomposes amygdalin directly into these compounds without the intermediate formation of mandelic nitrile glucoside.

Several other glucosides of this nature have been isolated. The saponins are a group of substances characterized by forming a lather with water; they occur in soap-bark. Mention may also be made of indican, the glucoside of the indigo plant; this is hydrolysed by the indigo ferment, indimulsiri, to indoxyl and indiglucin.
