= C13H16O7 =

The molecular formula C_{13}H_{16}O_{7} (molar mass: 284.26 g/mol, exact mass: 284.0896 u) may refer to:

- Benzoyl-β-D-glucoside
- Helicin
