= In the Mood (disambiguation) =

"In the Mood" is a big band-era song popularized by Glenn Miller. It may also refer to:

== Film, theatre and TV ==
- In the Mood, a 1983 play by Keith Waterhouse
- In the Mood (TV series), a 1971–72 Canadian television series
- In the Mood (film), a 1987 film starring Patrick Dempsey
- In the Mood (2006 film), a short film funded by the UK Film Council Completion Fund
- "In the Mood" (Goodnight Sweetheart series 1) a 1993 television episode
- "In the Mood" (Goodnight Sweetheart series 4) a 1997 television episode
- "In the Mood" (Miranda), also known as "Teacher", a 2009 television episode

== Music ==
- In the Mood (album), a 1966 jazz album by Chet Baker and the Mariachi Brass
- In the Mood (EP), a 2023 EP by Shaggy
- "In the Mood" (Ricki-Lee Coulter song)
- "In the Mood" (Robert Plant song)
- "In the Mood" (Rush song)
- "In the Mood", a song by Tyrone Davis from In the Mood with Tyrone Davis
- "In the Mood", a song by Alphaville from Forever Young
- "In the Mood", a song by To My Surprise from To My Surprise
- "In The Mood", a song by Hellyeah from their eponymous album
