= I'm in the Mood =

I'm in the Mood may refer to:

- "I'm in the Mood" (CeCe Peniston song), 1994
- "I'm in the Mood" (John Lee Hooker song), 1951
- I'm in the Mood (album), a 1983 album by Little Willie Littlefield
- "I'm in the Mood", a song by Raffi from the 1982 album Rise and Shine

== See also ==
- In the Mood (disambiguation)
- I'm in the Mood for Love (disambiguation)
