= John the Conqueror =

Folk hero of African-American folklore

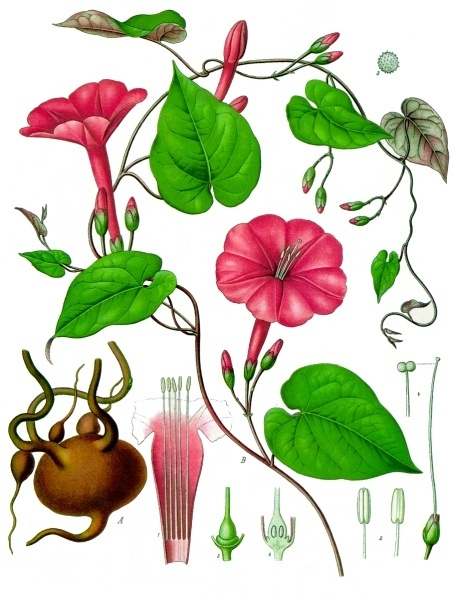
The roots of Ipomoea jalapa, when dried, are carried as the John the Conqueror root amulet.

John the Conqueror, also known as High John the Conqueror, John, Jack, Jim, and many other folk variants, is a deity from the African-American spiritual system called Hoodoo. Many of its earliest mentions are from oral traditions and in tales from escaped slaves, such as Frederick Douglass's autobiography Narrative of the Life of Frederick Douglass, an American Slave, published in 1845. He is associated with the roots of Ipomoea purga, the John the Conqueror root or John the Conqueroo, a plant native to the South-eastern United States. Tales of magical powers are ascribed in African-American folklore to the plant, especially among practitioners of Hoodoo. John the Conqueror has also been mentioned in songs by Muddy Waters, Bo Diddley, and Dr. John.

== Use in Hoodoo ==
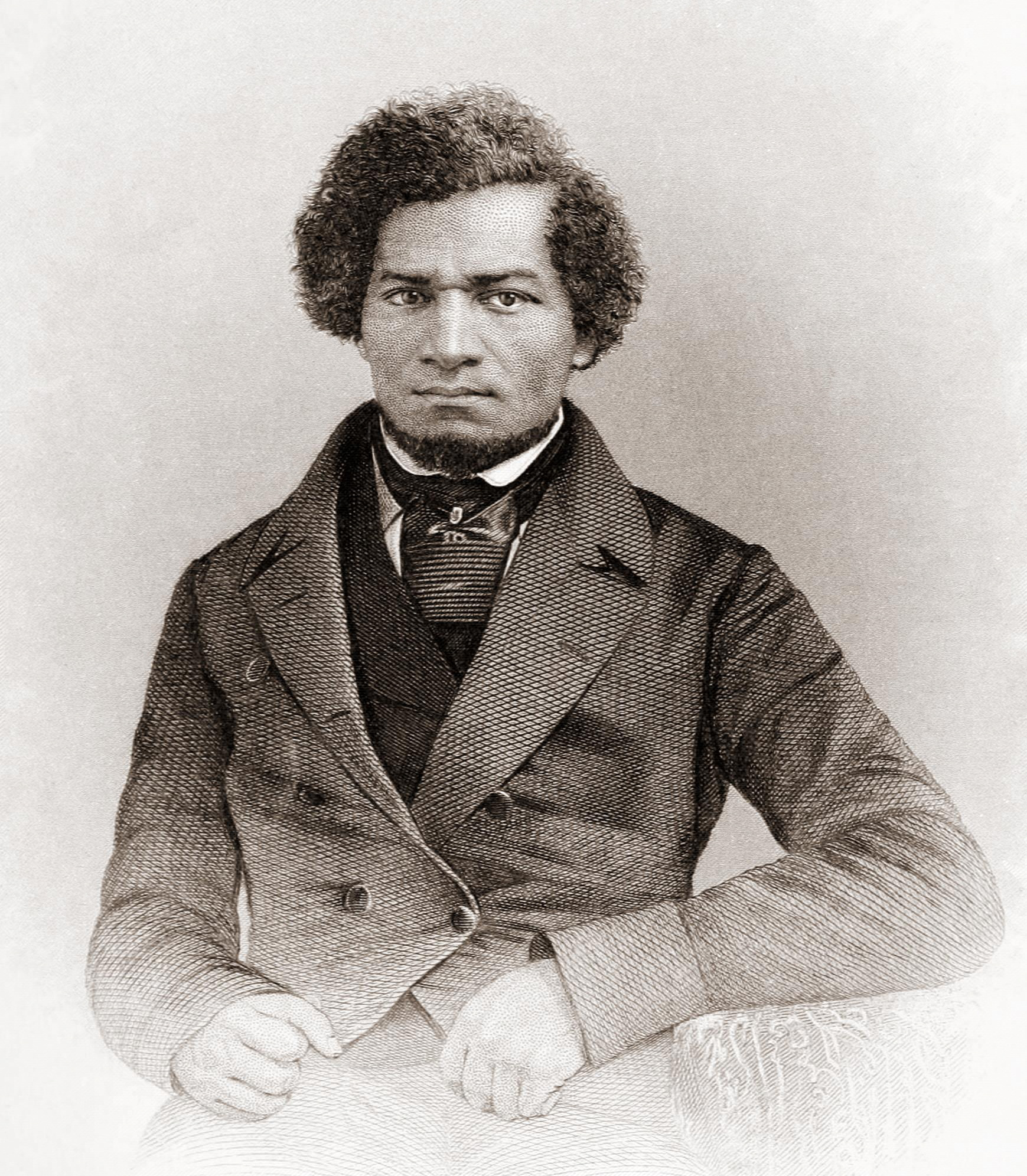
Frederick Douglass received a High John root from an enslaved conjurer named Sandy Jenkins for protection against slaveholders.

High John the Conqueror has its earliest known roots in Congolese culture, with the folk hero thought to have originated from stories of a Congolese Prince who was sold into slavery. Symbolizing luck and strength, the "High John root" has strong connections to use in hoodoo, with some even believing High John's spirit could be summoned and used for guidance and protection on plantations. African-American Hoodoo practitioners place High John roots inside mojo bags for protection, victory, empowerment, good luck, love, and protection from evil spirits: "...practitioners do this out of their reverence for or worship of the spirit (or in this case, John de Conquer, who also symbolizes ties to their enslaved ancestors through the land or 'soil of the South.')" ..."we not only find that the spirit of John de Conquer inhabits or 'possesses' a root, but he is also woven into a mojo bag that practitioners wear on their persons or store in a ‘secret place’ of their house." The root was used during slavery in the Southern United States by enslaved African-Americans to protect from slaveholders. Frederick Douglass and Henry Bibb used the High John root to prevent whippings and for protection from slaveholders. In an Arkansas slave narrative, ex-slave Marion Johnson used High John roots to conquer his enemies and receive protection from conjure.

=== Cultural appropriation ===
In the twentieth century, white drug store owners appropriated Hoodoo and put a white man on High John the Conqueror product labels. As a result, some people do not know of the cultural and historical origins of the African-American folk spirit John the Conqueror in the enslaved Black community and in present day Black American culture. In 2012, Rob Cleveland, an African-American stage performer, created a play about High John the Conqueror to demystify the folk spirit to audiences. The play focuses on John the Conqueror as an enslaved man whose spirit of resistance could never be broken and who outwitted his enslavers. The spirit of resistance in John the Conqueror encouraged enslaved people to resist their slaveholders to gain their freedom. In 2022, MadameNoire, an online magazine geared toward the lifestyles of African-American women, interviewed Black Hoodoo practitioners who voiced their concerns about the appropriation of Hoodoo: "White-washed Hoodoo doesn’t even acknowledge John the Conqueror that much because he’s been white-washed to be the type of Spirit that helps men with their virility, help men get women, help gamblers get lucky, and he’s so much more than that..." Storyteller Diane Ferlatte performed the African-American folk tale about High John Conqueror that tells the victories of John the Conqueror on the plantation and how he unified the slave community to escape from slavery. Ferlatte tells other African-American folk stories about Br'er Rabbit, Brer Fox, and Uncle Remus. African-American scholars explain that High John the Conqueror symbolized freedom from slavery. High John the Conqueror was a trickster and was able to outsmart his enslavers.

== Folk hero ==
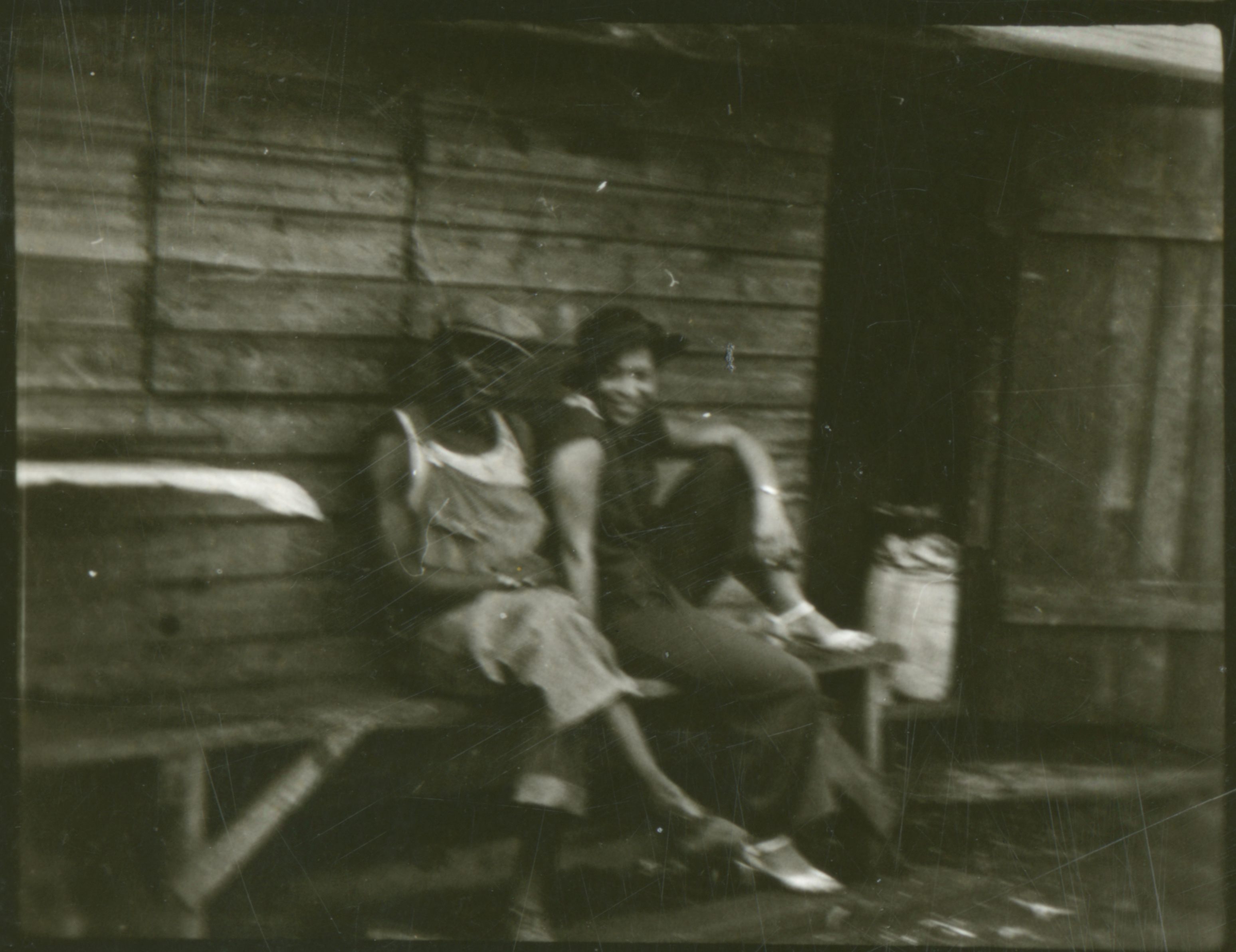
Zora Neale Hurston and unidentified man 1935 Belle Glade, Florida. Hurston documented stories about High John the Conqueror from African-Americans in the Southern United States.

Sometimes, John is an African prince (son of a king of Congo), said to have ridden a giant crow called "Old Familiar". He was sold as a slave in the Americas. Despite his enslavement, his spirit was never broken. He survived in folklore as a reluctant folk hero, a sort of trickster figure, because of the tricks he played to evade those who played tricks on him. Joel Chandler Harris's Br'er Rabbit of the Uncle Remus stories is a similar archetype to that of High John the Conqueror, outdoing those who would do him in. Zora Neale Hurston wrote of his adventures ("High John de Conquer") in her folklore collection The Sanctified Church.

In one traditional John the Conqueror story told by Virginia Hamilton, and probably based on Jean, the Soldier, and Eulalie, the Devil's Daughter, John falls in love with the Devil's daughter. The Devil sets John a number of impossible tasks: he must clear 60 acres (24 ha) of land in half a day and then sow it with corn and reap it in the other half a day. The Devil's daughter furnishes John with a magical axe and plow that get these impossible tasks done, but warns John that her father the Devil means to kill him even if he performs them. John and the Devil's daughter steal the Devil's own horses; the Devil pursues them, but they escape his clutches by shape-shifting.

In "High John De Conquer", Zora Neale Hurston reports that:

like King Arthur of England, he has served his people. And, like King Arthur, he is not dead. He waits to return when his people shall call him again ... High John de Conquer went back to Africa, but he left his power here, and placed his American dwelling in the root of a certain plant. Only possess that root, and he can be summoned at any time.

This is from Hurston's published article in American Mercury magazine in 1943. In this article, she relates a few stories about High John, enough to define him, but not an exhaustive survey of the folklore. The purpose was to present the nation with the hope-building and the power of this inspiring figure during the darkest days of World War II. The article ends with:

So the brother in black offers to these United States the source of courage that endures, and laughter. High John de Conquer. If the news from overseas reads bad, if the nation inside seems like it is stuck in the Tar Baby, listen hard, and you will hear High John de Conquer treading on his singing-drum. You will know then, that no matter how bad things look now, it will be worse for those who seek to oppress us. ... White America, take a laugh from out of our black mouths, and win! We give you High John de Conquer.

— The American Mercury, October 1943, pp. 450-458

== Plant information ==
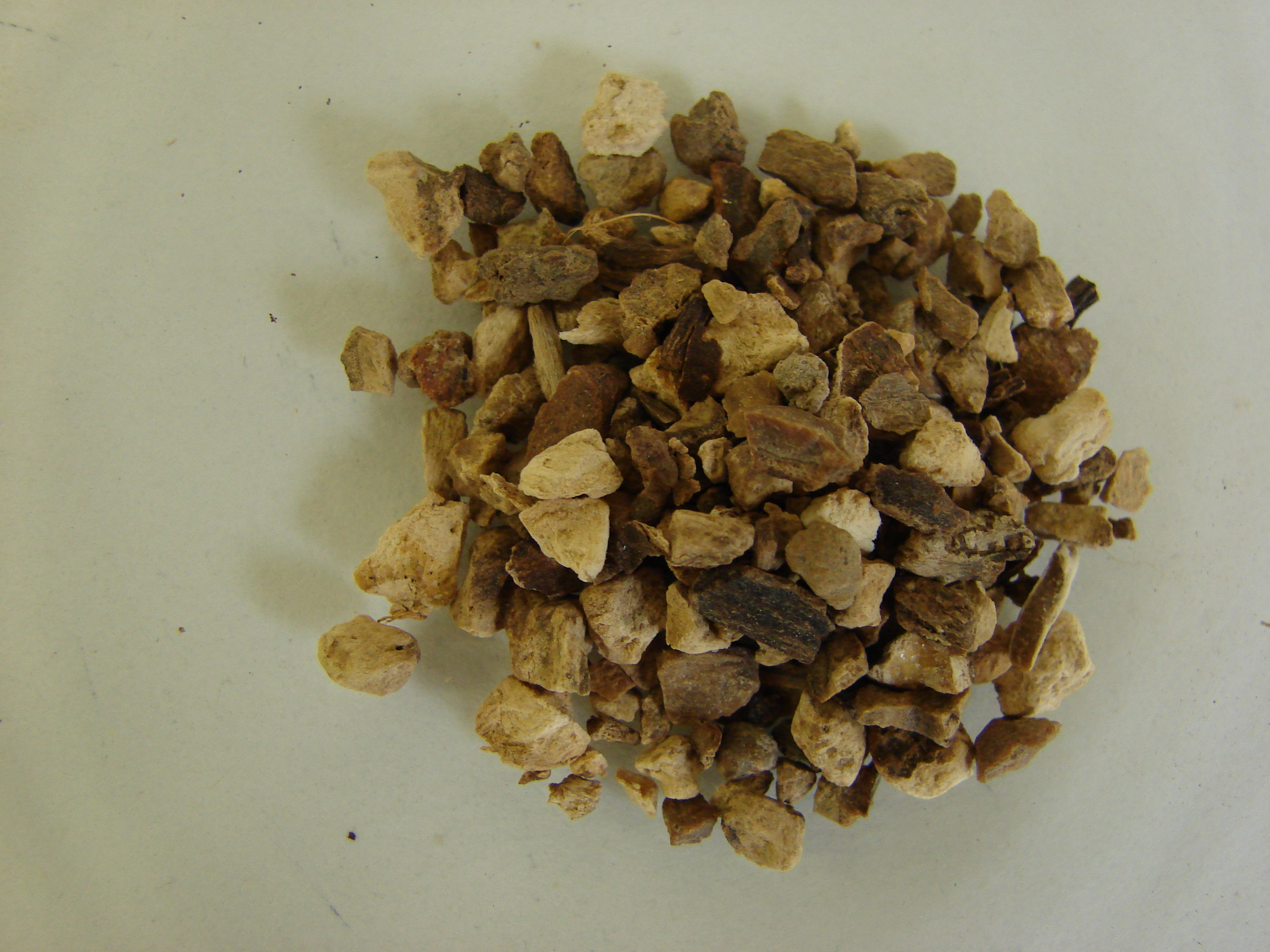
Jalapae root

The root known as High John the Conqueror or John the Conqueror root is said to be the root of Ipomoea jalapa, also known as Ipomoea purga, an Ipomoea species related to the morning glory and the sweet potato. The plant is known in some areas as bindweed or jalap root. It has a pleasant, earthy odor, but it is a strong laxative if taken internally. It is not used for this purpose in folk magic; it is instead used as one of the parts of a mojo bag. It is typically used in sexual spells of various sorts and it is also considered lucky for gambling. It is likely that the root acquired its reputation in sexual magic because, when dried, it resembles the testicles of a dark-skinned man. Because of this, when it is employed as an amulet, it is important that the root used should be whole and unblemished. Dried pieces and chips of the root are used in formulating oils and washes that are used in other sorts of spells.

Cecil Adams has erroneously written that John the Conqueror root is the root of St. John's wort. St. John's wort root is a thin and thread-like root while John the Conqueror root is a tuber. John the Conqueror root is carried by the user and the spell is cast by rubbing the root, which could not be done with a filamentous root.

== Other herbs related to the legend ==
Other roots are linked to the same body of legends.

Low John is the root of the trillium or wake-robin, Trillium grandiflorum. It is carried on the person for assistance in family matters. It is also known as Dixie John or Southern John and additionally is the basis for a hoodoo formula called Dixie Love Oil.

"Chewing John" is galangal, Alpinia galanga, a member of the ginger family. This is chewed much as chewing tobacco is chewed, to sweeten the breath and to calm the stomach. It is said that if you spit the juice from chewing this root onto the floor of a courtroom before the judge enters, you will win your case. Other names for this root are Little John and Little John to Chew. It is often confused with "Low John" or 'Dixie John'.

== In popular culture ==
Muddy Waters mentions John the Conqueror as "Johnny Cocheroo" in the songs "Mannish Boy" and "I'm Your Hoochie Coochie Man". In "Mannish Boy", the line is "I think I'll go down/To old Kansas too/I'm gonna bring back my second cousin/That little Johnny Conqueroo". This line is borrowed from the Bo Diddley song "I'm a Man", to which "Mannish Boy" is an answer song. The root is also referred to in the song 'Black John the Conqueror' by Dr. John from his 1971 album The Sun, Moon & Herbs. The song's lyrics and refrain speak of a wise old man holding 'black John the Conqueror in his hand'.
