= Like parent =

Like Parent is a mobile application that was created by Mualchon Chatsuwan and released for iOS and Android. Users can upload photographs of themselves and their child, after which point the application will compare the physical characteristics of the three people to see which person the child most closely resembles. The application became popular in mid-2015. Chatsuwan commented on the application's popularity, stating that he found it surprising. Reviews for Like Parent have been mostly positive, with a writer for MadameNoire stating that it was good as a source of entertainment as long as users did not take it too seriously.
