= Happy Ever After (Ricki-Lee song) =

Single by Ricki-Lee Coulter

from the album Dance in the Rain
- Released: 11 July 2014
- Recorded: 2013
- Length: 3:45
- Label: EMI
- Songwriters: Ricki-Lee Coulter; David Schuler; Hal Linton

Ricki-Lee Coulter singles chronology
"All We Need Is Love" (2014)	"Happy Ever After" (2014)	"Giddyup" (2014)

Lyric video
- "Happy Ever After" on YouTube

"Happy Ever After" is a song recorded by Australian singer and songwriter Ricki-Lee Coulter. It was written by Coulter, David Schuler and Hal Linton. The song was originally included on the digital extended play (EP) of Coulter's previous single "All We Need Is Love". It was later released on 11 July 2014 as the second single from her fourth studio album, Dance in the Rain.

Upon its release, "Happy Ever After" debuted at number 65 on the ARIA Singles Chart. Coulter promoted the song on television and radio programs. It was also part of her set list for the Australian leg of Jason Derulo's Tattoos World Tour, where she was the supporting act.

== Writing and lyrics ==
"Happy Ever After" was written by Ricki-Lee Coulter, David Schuler and Hal Linton. In 2013, Coulter travelled to New York City and held a studio session with Schuler and Linton. During the session, she remembered hearing the instrumental track that Schuler had played to her a few weeks earlier because "it was mesmerizing" and she "loved it instantly". Coulter then suggested that they write the lyrics to "Happy Ever After" over the track's guitar hook and kick drum. She said, "As we slowly wrote this song I realised just how special it was. The guitar hook was hypnotic, the melody was sweet and soulful and the track had so much heart...it was magic." Coulter called "Happy Ever After" her favourite song she has ever written and said it is a continuation of her 2011 release "Raining Diamonds".

Lyrically, the song finds Coulter, as the female protagonist, singing "about new beginnings and starting a life together" with her partner. In an interview with The Daily Telegraph, Coulter stated that the song is based on her relationship with fiancé Rich Harrison, saying that it "is about that fairytale love and meeting the person who makes you whole. It's about Rich, it's about our lives and our future together."

== Release ==
"Happy Ever After" was originally featured as a B-side on the digital extended play (EP) of Coulter's previous single "All We Need Is Love". It was later released on 11 July 2014 as the second single from Coulter's fourth studio album, Dance in the Rain. According to Kathy McCabe of News.com.au, Australian pop radio stations quickly added "Happy Ever After" to their playlists following its release. The song debuted and peaked at number 65 on ARIA Singles Chart issue dated 21 July 2014 and became Coulter's sixteenth entry on that chart. "Happy Ever After" fell out of the chart's top one hundred the following week.

== Promotion ==
In April–May 2014, Coulter was the supporting act for Jason Derulo's Australian leg of his Tattoos World Tour, where she performed "Happy Ever After" as part of her set list. Coulter stated that seeing a positive reaction from the crowd is the reason she decided to release "Happy Ever After" as a single, saying: "Every single night I was blown away by how amazing the response was! Every night, people lit up the arena with their flashlights and to see the look on so many of their faces during the song was incredible." On 16 July 2014, Coulter appeared on Nova 96.9's Fitzy and Wippa breakfast show to promote the single.

She performed "Happy Ever After" during the seventh live decider show of the sixth season of The X Factor Australia on 23 September 2014. For the performance, Coulter wore a Vera Wang wedding gown with a jewel encrusted belt, as a nod to the media's interest in her upcoming wedding to Harrison and a homage to Madonna in her "Like a Virgin" music video. Yasmin Vought of TVFix called it a "stunning performance", while Out In Perth described Coulter's gown as "eye catching". Take 40 Australia wrote that she looked like a "princess" and sounded "like a bonafide diva".

== Track listing ==
- Digital download
1. "Happy Ever After" (Radio Edit) – 3:45

== Charts ==
Chart (2014)	Peak position
Australia (ARIA)	65

== Release history ==
Country	Date	Format	Label
Australia	11 July 2014	Digital download	EMI Music Australia
