= Dance in the Rain (album) =

Studio album by Ricki-Lee Coulter
- Released: 17 October 2014
- Genres: Pop; dance; R&B
- Length: 49:01
- Label: EMI
- Producers: Ricki-Lee Coulter; Stuart Crichton

Ricki-Lee Coulter chronology
Fear & Freedom (2012)	Dance in the Rain (2014)	On My Own (2024)

Singles from Dance in the Rain
- 1. "All We Need Is Love" Released: 2 May 2014; 2. "Happy Ever After" Released: 11 July 2014; 3. "Giddyup" Released: 3 October 2014

Dance in the Rain is the fourth studio album by Australian singer and songwriter Ricki-Lee Coulter, released on 17 October 2014 by EMI Music Australia. Coulter began working on Dance in the Rain shortly after the completion of her previous album Fear & Freedom (2012). Recording and production took place in various places around the world over two years. Coulter was the executive producer of the album and collaborated with many songwriters, including Brian Kierulf, Brian Lee, David Schuler, Ilan Kidron, Stuart Crichton, Carl Sturken and Evan Rogers. Musically, Dance in the Rain incorporates styles of pop, dance, R&B and reggae.

The release of Dance in the Rain coincided with Coulter's appearance as a celebrity contestant on the fourteenth season of Dancing with the Stars Australia. The album debuted at number 14 on the ARIA Albums Chart and became Coulter's second top-twenty album. It was preceded by its first two singles "All We Need Is Love" and "Happy Ever After". The former peaked within the top-forty of the ARIA Singles Chart, while the latter only reached the top-seventy.

== Background and development ==
Dance in the Rain is the follow-up to Coulter's third studio album Fear & Freedom (2012), which debuted at number seven on the ARIA Albums Chart and became her first top-ten album. Coulter began working on Dance in the Rain shortly after the completion of Fear & Freedom. As executive producer of Dance in the Rain, Coulter had full control over the songwriters and producers she wanted to work with. She also spent her own money to travel overseas to write and record material for the album. Coulter intended for Dance in the Rain to be an honest album and wanted to avoid following a certain sound and concept. She worked on it for two years in various places around the world, including Bali, Brisbane, Los Angeles, Melbourne, Nashville, New York City, Paris, Sweden and Sydney. Stuart Crichton co-produced a majority of the album's songs alongside Coulter. Speaking of the inspiration behind Dance in the Rain, Coulter stated: "Life throws so much at you and I write about it all ... I figured I had a lot to say and there were so many things I wanted to express – and I managed to pull it all together for this one album."

== Music and lyrics ==
Musically, Dance in the Rain consists of pop, dance, R&B and reggae styles. The album opens with the title track "Dance in the Rain", which was described by Subculture Media as "dramatic and self-affirming". The second single and second song "Happy Ever After" is based on Coulter's relationship with her fiancé Rich Harrison. The album's first single and third track "All We Need Is Love" is a pop and dance song about encouraging people to support one another and spread love. The fourth track "In the Mood" was described by Cameron Adams of the Herald Sun as "anthemic and athletic". The third single and fifth track "Giddyup" is an R&B and pop song, with synth stabs, claps, and electro beats. Adams noted that "Giddyup" sees Coulter channeling "her inner Beyoncé", while Subculture Media noted that it features "some assertive and intoxicating sass throughout". Nic Kelly of Project U compared the song's production to Coulter's 2007 single "Can't Touch It", while Adams called it "the new 'Can't Touch It'".

The album's sixth track "Criminal" is a reggae-pop song that features Barbadian recording artist Shane Free and was co-written by Coulter, Carl Sturken and Evan Rogers. The ninth track "Until We Drop" is a "club-ready" song that features dubstep stabs. Subculture Media described the tenth song "Diva" as "bangin' club-ready", while Adams viewed it as a "high energy" song "tailor-made for a sweaty gay club". Adams also noted that the "pace slows" on the twelfth track on Dance in the Rain, titled "Catch Me If You Can", which he described as "William Orbit-esque". The thirteenth track "Mirage" is an "emotive ballad" that was co-written by Coulter and Harrison. Adams noted that the ballad features "a torrent of honest lyrics and tangible pain".

== Release and promotion ==
On 19 September 2014, Coulter announced the release date for Dance in the Rain and revealed the album cover. Following the announcement, Dance in the Rain was made available to pre-order on the iTunes Store. Three of the album's songs, "In the Mood", "Dance in the Rain" and "Mirage", were also made available to download alongside the iTunes pre-order. Fans who pre-ordered Dance in the Rain on iTunes would instantly receive these songs for free. Prior to the album's release, Coulter performed "Happy Ever After" on The X Factor Australia (23 September 2014), "In the Mood" at Nickelodeon Australia's Slimefest concert in Sydney (26 September 2014) and on ABC's television special, Friday Night Crack-Up (10 October 2014).

Dance in the Rain was released both digitally and physically on 17 October 2014, to coincide with Coulter's appearance as a celebrity contestant on the fourteenth season of Dancing with the Stars Australia. The deluxe version was released simultaneously with the standard edition. It was available to purchase on Coulter's official website and included a signed lyric sheet of the title track and four printed photos of Coulter. On the day of the album's release, she performed "Giddyup" on Sunrise. The following day, she performed "Giddyup" and "Diva" at the Royal Randwick Racecourse in Sydney. Coulter performed the title track on The Morning Show on 23 October 2014. In an interview with Switched On, Coulter revealed that she would be planning to embark on a concert tour in support of the album. However, no concert tour was ever announced.

=== Singles ===
"All We Need Is Love" premiered on Australian radio stations on 14 April 2014 as the lead single from Dance in the Rain. It was released as a digital extended play (EP) on 2 May 2014, which featured the B-side track "Happy Ever After" and an acoustic cover of Avicii's "Wake Me Up". Upon its release, "All We Need Is Love" debuted and peaked at number 39 on the ARIA Singles Chart. "Happy Ever After" was later released on 11 July 2014 as the album's second single, and peaked at number 65 on ARIA Singles Chart. The third single "Giddyup" was released on 3 October 2014, but failed to impact the charts.

The video clip of "Mirage" on 31 October 2014 although not an official single.

== Reception ==
Cameron Adams of the Herald Sun awarded Dance in the Rain three-and-a-half stars out of five and called it a "confident" album that sounds like "confessions on a dance floor". Adams also complimented its various musical styles and viewed the track "Mirage" as a "career and vocal highlight" for Coulter. Michael James of Q News called the album "her strongest release yet" and wrote that it "successfully manages to combine a strong personal narrative with catchy upbeat dance tracks". For the issue dated 27 October 2014, Dance in the Rain debuted at number 14 on the ARIA Albums Chart and became Coulter's second top-twenty album. It also became her third album to miss the ARIA top-ten and it failed to match her previous album's chart position of number seven. In its second week, Dance in the Rain dropped 72 places to number 86.

== Track listing ==
No.	Title	Writer(s)	Length
1.	"Dance in the Rain"	Ricki-Lee Coulter; Brian Kierulf; Joshua Schwartz	3:51
2.	"Happy Ever After"	Coulter; David Schuler; Hal Linton	3:45
3.	"All We Need Is Love"	Coulter; Stuart Crichton; Ilan Kidron	3:16
4.	"In the Mood"	Coulter; Crichton; Brian Lee	2:40
5.	"Giddyup"	Coulter; Kierulf; Schwartz	3:01
6.	"Criminal" (featuring Shane Free)	Coulter; Shane Free; Evan Rogers; Carl Sturken	3:51
7.	"Night Vision"	Arnthor Birgisson; Coulter; Tiffany Vartanyan	4:24
8.	"Only You"	Coulter; Crichton; Lee	3:49
9.	"Until We Drop"	Crichton; Kidron; Coulter	2:55
10.	"Diva"	Coulter; Crichton; Lee	3:15
11.	"Runaway"	Coulter; Nicholas James McGuinn; Schuler	3:30
12.	"Catch Me If You Can"	Coulter; Schuler	3:22
13.	"Mirage"	Coulter; Stephen Toulmin; Richard Harrison	3:46
14.	"You"	Coulter; Chris DeStefano; Kidron	3:36

== Charts ==
Chart (2014)	Peak position
Australian Albums (ARIA)	14

== Release history ==
Region	Date	Format	Edition(s)	Label	Catalogue	Ref.
Australia	17 October 2014	CD; digital download	Standard; deluxe	EMI Music Australia	3799748	
