= Baiyu (singer) =

Chinese-American singer-songwriter and actress

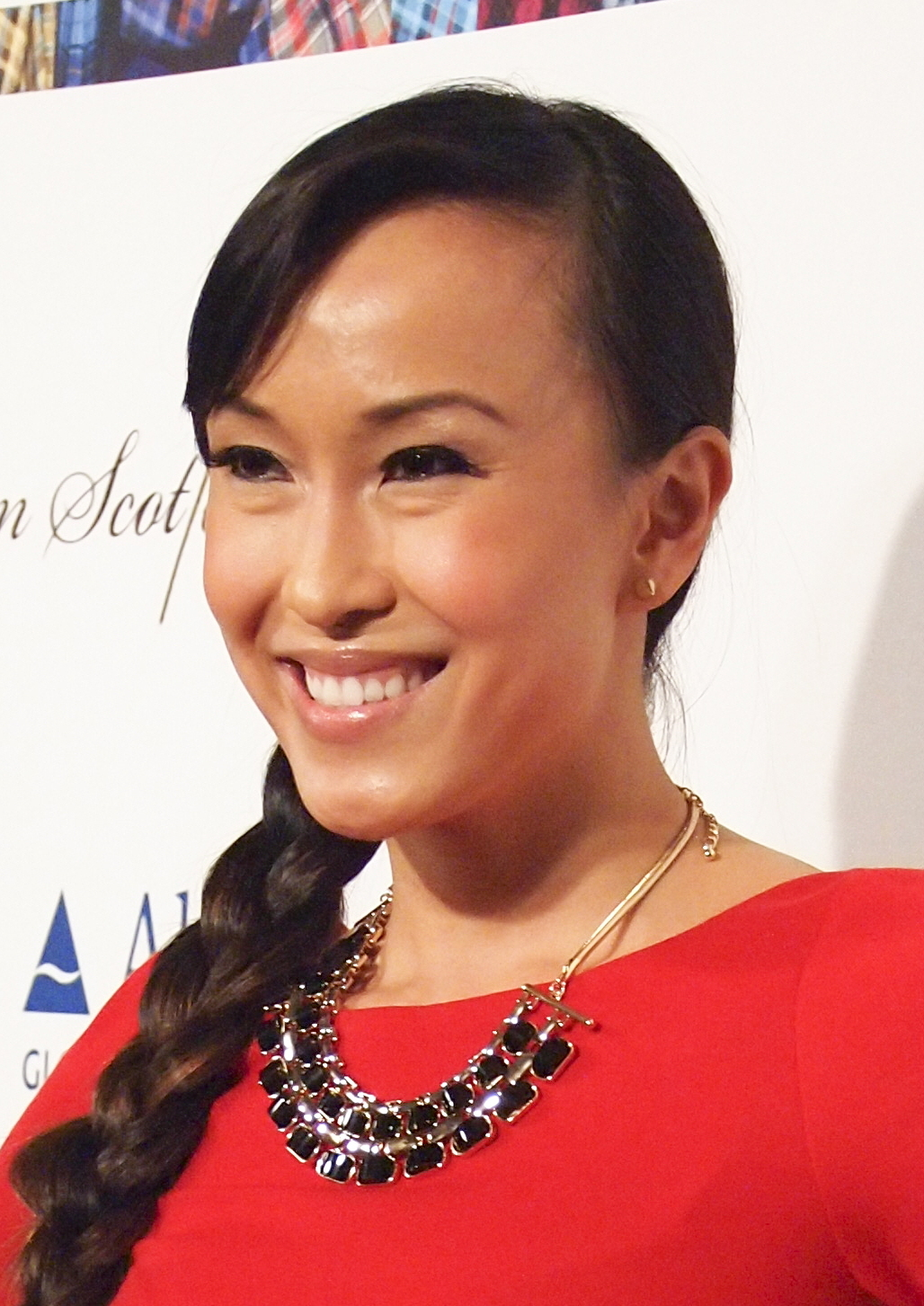
- Baiyu in 2013

Background information
- Born: Baiyu Chen; Xiamen, China
- Origin: Princeton
- Genres: R&B, pop
- Occupations: Singer-songwriter, actress
- Instruments: Vocals
- Years active: 2006–present
- Website: http://www.baiyuonline.com

Sara Baiyu Porritt, known professionally as Baiyu, is a Chinese-born American singer-songwriter and actress. In the early 1990s, her family moved to Gaithersburg, Maryland where she was then given the American name of "Sara". Baiyu has appeared in several independent films and was a VJ for the mtvU show "The Freshmen" from 2006 to 2008. She completed high school in three years' time, and later graduated from Princeton University in 2008 with a degree in Sociology.

== Early life ==
Baiyu grew up in a musical family, as both of her parents were musicians. She resided in Xiamen, Fujian until the age of 8, at which point she reunited with her parents in the United States after having lived with her grandparents for 2 years. Baiyu attended Quince Orchard High School where she was a member of the Track and Field team as well as a dedicated member of the school choir. She took the second semester of her junior and senior years off to pursue a career in music.

== College years ==
While attending Princeton, Baiyu traveled to New York City in between classes and schoolwork to develop her musical talents as well as to be a VJ and host for mtvU's show The Freshmen. She sang in Princeton's jazz ensemble headed up by Anthony Branker and was a member and co-director of the school's hip hop dance company BAC. She sang at multiple functions and venues around campus and was often seen writing, referencing and recording music late into the night in the school's various common areas. She was a member of Colonial Club.

== Music career ==
=== 2010–11: Career beginnings and B-Side & Fan Fair ===
Baiyu released her first EP "B-Side" in December 2010. Most of the songs from this project were completed during her 6-month stay in Kauai, Hawaii where she also completed the filming for an independent film, along with a music video for the single "Sweet Misery". While in the mountains of Kapaa, Baiyu also recorded a remix of Ryan Leslie's song "When We Dance", for which a video was also released.

In 2011, Baiyu donated all profits from her follow-up EP Fan Fair towards Japanese earthquake and tsunami relief. Her single "Take a Number" featuring Fred the Godson received airplay on Hot 97 and multiple college radio stations. Her music video for the second single "Together" premiered on MTV Networks' Logo TV in August 2011. The video was also picked up by MTV UK, MTV Latin America, MTV Canada, MTV España, MTV Brasil, and VH1 Latin America. Fan Fair hit over 200,000 downloads via the Frostwire platform.

=== 2012–2019: Hunter, CW The Next, and debut album ===
On June 13, 2012, Baiyu released the first piece of her project Hunter from her self launched label Shredded Music. Hunter is a 13-song album that is accompanied by an animated short entitled "The Illuminators," whose heroine is based on Baiyu. Hunter features several artists including Los of Puff Daddy's Bad Boy Records; Rotimi, best known for his role on the show "Boss" from the Starz Network; Barbadian soul singer Hal Linton; and Paul Kim of American Idol.

For the launch of the music portion of Hunter, Baiyu held a release event at the Custo Barcelona flagship store in SOHO. The album's first single, "Invisible", is a collaboration with Rotimi. The music video for the single gained over 6 million views on WorldStarHipHop and was on regular rotation on Canada's MuchMusic television station. Upon release of the video, Vibe referred to Baiyu as "an industry one-to-watch." MTV Buzzworthy named Baiyu's track "Journey of Souls" one of its "Top 5 Must-Hear Pop Songs of the Week". Hunter was produced primarily by KQuick of Grand Staff LLC, who is known for his work with artists such as Ryan Leslie, Chris Brown, Fabolous, and Mýa.

In July 2012 Baiyu became an official brand ambassador for Sprayground, a line of backpacks and accessories, appearing in their Summer 2012 lookbook.

Baiyu was one of four individuals highlighted on the CW Network show "The Next" by executive producer Queen Latifah. On the show, Baiyu was mentored by hip hop artist Nelly who spent 72 hours with Baiyu in preparation for her New York performance at The Paramount. The show premiered on August 16, 2012.

In 2013, Baiyu was named one of Yahoo News' "Top 10 Musicians to Watch for 2013" and one of UNSound Magazine's "13 Artists to Watch in 2013". As a public figure often in the limelight, Baiyu took a divergent approach in 2013. Releasing a new single on the first of every month starting 1/1/13, she moved away from album covers that showcase her image and opted instead for artwork as a representation for her music. This is believed to be in an effort to encourage listeners to focus on her voice and message, instead of making assumptions based on her looks and heritage.

In July and August of 2013, Baiyu collaborated with Eckō Unltd. Canada as the soundtrack and model for one of their campaigns. In September, she worked with Complex (magazine) on their #oneofakindstyle campaign with Dr Pepper.

Her 2013 album Ayahuasca takes her fans even deeper into a journey of introspection as she chronicles her experience with the sacred brew.

=== 2019–present: HUR podcast and DEI work ===
In August 2019, Baiyu launched a podcast called Hear Us Roar featuring inspired conversations with fearless Asian women about how ideas and passions can ignite transformative journeys. She currently leads Diversity and Inclusion for OMD USA.

== Philanthropy ==
In addition to donating the proceeds of Fan Fair to the Japanese Red Cross to aid in the tsunami relief efforts, Baiyu became a voice for DonorsChoose, working with its board of directors to raise funds for music programs in schools throughout various high poverty neighborhoods. Baiyu has performed for the Sneakers for Scholars program, Camp Good Grief, and the Gala for the Homeless event. She is also a volunteer for New York Cares, and has been honored by Well Done! NYC as an outstanding individual who has "given back to various communities of New York City" as presented by the offices of Senator Chuck Schumer.

== Filmography ==
=== Television appearances: as self ===
- 2012: CW's "The Next"
- 2011: MYX TV's "MYX TV Top 10"
- 2006–2008: mtvU's "The Freshmen"

=== Film: actress ===
- 2012: "The Illuminators: Division"
- 2012: "The Chronicles of Elijah Sincere"
- 2012: "You're Nobody 'til Somebody Kills You"
- 2011: "Queen of Media"

=== Film: producer ===
- 2012: "The Illuminators: Division"

== Discography ==
=== Full studio albums ===
Year	Album
2013	Ayahuasca: Released: December 1, 2013
2012	Hunter: Released: June 13, 2012

=== Extended plays ===
Year	Album
2011	Fan Fair: Released: April 15, 2011
2010	B-Side: Released: December 7, 2010
