= Benzoyl group =

Chemical group (–C(=O)C6H5

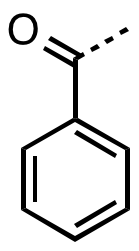
The benzoyl functional group.

In organic chemistry, benzoyl (/ˈbɛnzoʊɪl/, BENZ-oh-il) is the functional group with the formula −COC_{6}H_{5} and structure −C(=O)−C_{6}H_{5}. It can be viewed as benzaldehyde missing one hydrogen. The benzoyl group has a mass of 105 amu.

The term "benzoyl" should not be confused with benzyl, which has the formula −CH_{2}−C_{6}H_{5}. The benzoyl group is given the symbol "Bz" whereas benzyl is commonly abbreviated "Bn".

== Sources ==
Benzoyl chloride is a favored source of benzoyl groups, being used to prepare benzoyl ketones, benzamides (benzoyl amides), and benzoate esters. The source of many naturally occurring benzoyl compounds is the thioester benzoyl-CoA. Irradiation of benzil generates benzoyl radicals, which have the formula PhCO.

== Benzoyl compounds ==
Many ketones contain the benzoyl group. They have the formula C_{6}H_{5}CO–R, an important example being benzophenone.

Benzoyl esters and amides are common in organic chemistry. The esters are used as a protecting groups in organic synthesis, which can be easily removed by hydrolysis in dilute basic solution. Benzoyl-β-D-glucoside is a natural substance that can be found in Pteris ensiformis.
