= Fan Fair =

Fan Fair or FanFair may refer to:

- CMA Music Festival, a country music festival in Tennessee
- Fantasia Fair, a transgender and cross-dressing conference in Massachusetts
- Fan Fair (EP), a 2011 EP by Baiyu

== See also ==
- Fanfare (disambiguation)
