= Hunter (Baiyu album) =

Studio album by Baiyu
- Released: June 13, 2012
- Recorded: 2011–2012
- Genres: Contemporary R&B, pop, indie pop
- Length: 43:44
- Label: Shredded
- Producers: KQuick, Vaughn-J, Hal Linton, Baiyu (executive)

Hunter is a full length studio album by Chinese-American artist Baiyu released on June 13, 2012. The studio album component of "Hunter" is part of a larger project that is to be accompanied by a book of poetry as well as a comic book series and animated short entitled "The Illuminators" for which she is basis of the animated heroine. The album features several up and coming, as well as established artists including Los of Puff Daddy's Bad Boy Records; Rotimi, a singer-songwriter who is known for his role on the show "Boss" from the Starz Network; Barbadian soul singer Hal Linton; as well as Paul Kim of American Idol (season 6).

According to Baiyu's website, "Hunter" is a project that has allowed Baiyu to "take her audience through a journey of sound in an exploration of any and all things fundamental to the cravings of human nature. Baiyu explains, 'I feel like we're all Hunters in our own right, whether we're looking for glory or acceptance; love or revenge; or even just the simple things in life that put a smile on our faces—it is a quest for something that is in a way almost primal and innate to our individual characters.'" She goes on to reveal that "Hunter's tracklist is comprised of thirteen tunes whose tone ranges from Electro-Pop to R&B to haunting Indie-esque melodies all blanketed with Baiyu's deep rooted soulful musicality—each touching upon something that Baiyu herself is hunting for."

For the launch of the music portion of "Hunter", Baiyu held a release event at the famed Custo Barcelona flagship store in SOHO. The music video for her first single from the album is a tune entitled "Invisible" featuring Rotimi, which garnered over 6 million views on WorldStarHipHop and is on regular rotation on Canada's MuchMusic television station. Upon release of the video, Vibe coined Baiyu as "an industry one-to-watch, Baiyu is on the verge of stardom.". Shortly after the release of the studio album, MTV Buzzworthy crowned Baiyu's track "Journey of Souls" one of its "Top 5 Must-Hear Pop Songs Of The Week" paying her a "major compliment". The album was produced primarily by KQuick of Grand Staff LLC, who is known for his work with artists such as Ryan Leslie, Chris Brown, Fabolous, and Mýa.

== Track listing ==
No.	Title	Writer(s)	Producer(s)	Length
1.	"Journey of Souls"	Baiyu; KQuick	KQuick	4:41
2.	"Vertigo (ft. Los)"	Baiyu; KQuick	KQuick	3:43
3.	"Invisible (ft. Rotimi)"	Baiyu; KQuick	KQuick	3:38
4.	"Hunter"	Baiyu; KQuick	KQuick	3:46
5.	"Mind Freak"	Baiyu; KQuick	KQuick	1:20
6.	"Lost in Lisbon (ft. Hal Linton)"	Baiyu; Hal Linton	Hal Linton	3:54
7.	"Laws of Attraction"	Baiyu; KQuick	KQuick	3:35
8.	"Good Life"	Baiyu; KQuick	KQuick	2:52
9.	"Ashes to Ashes"	Baiyu; KQuick	KQuick	3:58
10.	"White Dove"	Baiyu; KQuick	KQuick	1:27
11.	"Lost and Found"	Baiyu; KQuick	KQuick	3:20
12.	"Make Believe (ft. Paul Kim)"	Vaughn-J; Baiyu; Paul Kim	Vaughn-J	3:44
13.	"Another Lifetime"	Baiyu; KQuick	KQuick	3:51
Total length:				43:73

All credits adapted from the included digital booklet.
