= Ayahuasca (disambiguation) =

Ayahuasca is a brew of various psychoactive plants.

Ayahuasca may also refer to:

- Ayahuasca (Pelt album), 2001
- Ayahuasca (Baiyu album), 2013
- Ayahuasca: Welcome to the Work, a 2013 album by Ben Lee
- Banisteriopsis caapi, one of the main ingredients in ayahuasca
- "Ayahuasca" (Simba La Rue song), 2025
- "Ayahuasca" (Veronica Maggio song), 2016
