= Jalpana =

- Village
- Location in Pakistan
- Coordinates: 32°15′40″N 72°31′15″E
- Country: Pakistan
- Province: Punjab
- District: Sargodha

Jalapana is a large village and union council in Sargodha District of the province of Punjab, in Pakistan. Its original name (with diacritics) is Jalpāna.

The village gets its name from the Jalap tribe, whose members were said to have founded the village. This was a very small settlement with uncultivated surroundings. In 1860s when India was under the British Raj, they started selling uncultivated lands of different areas of this region under they colonization policy, Khan Mohammed Sarfaraz Khan from Isakhel Niazi Pathan clan bought this land with his brothers with a total area of 200 squares (5000 acres) for the sum of Rs.18,000.

Khan began to encourage settlers from the local tribes. The village was now home to a number of Jat clans.

Then came the process of getting this area cultivated. For cultivation, water is necessary, and thus the first ever canal of Punjab was dug from river Jahlum to Jalpana by the Khan himself. The land on which a 20-mile-long (32 km) canal was dug was also bought by Khan from the local land owners. He dug out a canal on his personal expense to irrigate barren lands of not only this village but surrounding villages also. The farmers of these surrounding villages paid one-fourth of their agricultural produce to Khan M. Sarfaraz Khan in lieu of irrigation water used from this canal. This privately owned and managed irrigation system worked successfully for almost a century when Punjab government under CM Mumtaz Doultana nationalized all privately owned irrigation systems in Punjab in 1950s. Subsequently, the management of this canal was handed over to Irrigation department of Punjab by Shahnawaz Khan Niazi in 1970s.

Throughout the 1960s, the village was subject to a number of studies by the anthropologist Saghir Ahmad of Simon Fraser University, who studied the society and culture of Punjabi villages.
