= B-Side (EP) =

EP by Baiyu
- Released: December 7, 2010
- Recorded: 2010
- Genres: Contemporary R&B, pop, indie pop
- Length: 15:18
- Producers: James Shin, Write Mindz, Soundmasters Productions, Kevin Odom, Baiyu (executive)

Singles from B-Side
- 1. "Sweet Misery" Released: April 15, 2010; 2. "Foolish" Released: February 13, 2011

B-Side is a premiere five song extended play by Chinese-American artist Baiyu released on December 7, 2010 via the artist's Bandcamp page. Most of the songs from this project were completed during her 6-month stay in Kauai, Hawaii where she also completed the filming for an independent film, along with a music video for the single "Sweet Misery". While in the mountains of Kapaa, Baiyu also took this opportunity to record a remix version of Ryan Leslie's song "When We Dance", for which a video was also released, and subsequently featured on The Fader Bossip and the likes. Though "When We Dance" was not featured on the mixtape itself, it was one of the catalysts for launching Baiyu's music career into the public eye.

== Track listing ==
No.	Title	Writer(s)	Producer(s)	Length
1.	"B-Side"	Baiyu	James Shin	1:52
2.	"Sweet Misery"	Baiyu	Soundmasters Productions	3:23
3.	"Don't Cry"	Baiyu	Lucas Madrazo (guitar), Kevin Odom	3:00
4.	"Foolish"	Baiyu	Write Mindz	3:36
5.	"Tomorrow's Another Day"	Baiyu	Write Mindz	3:27
Total length:				15:18

All credits adapted from the included digital booklet.
