= Populin =

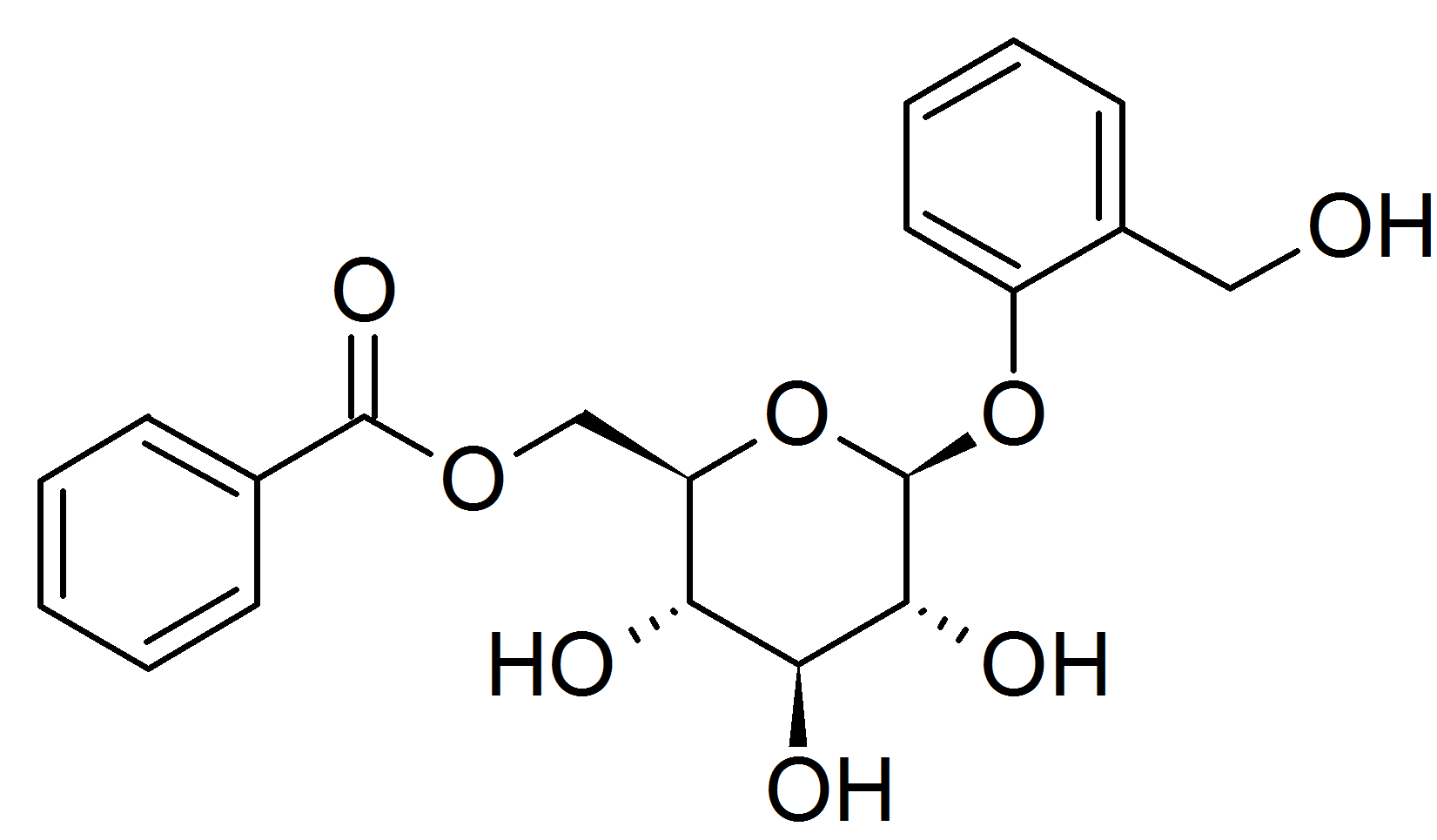

Names
- IUPAC name 2-(Hydroxymethyl)phenyl β-D-glucopyranoside 6-benzoate
- Systematic IUPAC name {(2R,3S,4S,5R,6S)-3,4,5-Trihydroxy-6-[2-(hydroxymethyl)phenoxy]oxan-2-yl}methyl benzoate
- Other names Populoside; Populine; Salicin 6'-benzoate

Identifiers
CAS Number	99-17-2
3D model (JSmol)	Interactive image
ChemSpider	83713
ECHA InfoCard	100.002.488
KEGG	C10823
PubChem CID	92735
UNII	XC8BY5AX02
CompTox Dashboard (EPA)	DTXSID90878492
- InChI: InChI=1S/C20H22O8/c21-10-13-8-4-5-9-14(13)27-20-18(24)17(23)16(22)15(28- 20)11-26-19(25)12-6-2-1-3-7-12/h1-9,15-18,20-24H,10-11H2/t15-,16-,17+, 18-,20-/m1/s1 Key: HHSKNLJWHGXWPK-BFMVXSJESA-N
- SMILES: C1=CC=C(C=C1)C(=O)OC[C@@H]2[C@H]([C@@H]([C@H]([C@@H](O2)OC3=CC=CC=C3CO)O)O)O

Properties
Chemical formula	C_{20}H_{22}O_{8}
Molar mass	390.388 g·mol^{−1}
- Except where otherwise noted, data are given for materials in their standard state (at 25 °C [77 °F], 100 kPa). Infobox references

Populin is a glucoside occurring in the bark, buds and leaves of certain species of poplar. The alkaline cleavage of populin produces benzoate and the glucoside salicin.
