= All We Need Is Love (song) =

Single by Ricki-Lee Coulter

from the album Dance in the Rain
- B-side: "Happy Ever After"
- Released: 2 May 2014
- Genre: Pop; dance
- Length: 3:16
- Label: EMI
- Songwriters: Ricki-Lee Coulter; Stuart Crichton; Ilan Kidron

Ricki-Lee Coulter singles chronology
"Come & Get in Trouble with Me" (2013)	"All We Need Is Love" (2014)	"Happy Ever After" (2014)

Music video
- "All We Need Is Love" on YouTube

"All We Need Is Love" is a song recorded by Australian singer and songwriter Ricki-Lee Coulter. It was released as a digital extended play on 2 May 2014, as the lead single from her fourth studio album Dance in the Rain. Coulter wrote the song with Ilan Kidron and Stuart Crichton, in hopes that it would encourage people to spread love and positivity. The lyrics are intended to make people smile and feel good about themselves.

Upon its release, "All We Need Is Love" debuted at number 39 on the ARIA Singles Chart. The accompanying music video was directed by Melvin J. Montalban and features stories about three people. Coulter promoted "All We Need Is Love" with interviews and performances on television and radio programs. The song was also part of Coulter's set list for the Australian leg of Jason Derulo's Tattoos World Tour, where she was the supporting act.

The song was used in the movie Alvin and the Chipmunks: The Road Chip and was played over the end credits.

== Writing and inspiration ==
"All We Need Is Love" was written by Ricki-Lee Coulter, Stuart Crichton and Ilan Kidron. Coulter stated that they were inspired to write the song after becoming fed up with all the drama in their personal lives and the bad things happening in today's society. She said, "We live in a world full of negativity, hate, criticism and judgment. We wanted to make a song about accepting and embracing each other, supporting, encouraging and complimenting each other and spreading love." Coulter also explained that the song's lyrics are intended to make people smile and feel good about themselves.

The line "Kicking down the doors / and coming alive" was inspired by a fan who sent Coulter a private message on Twitter, saying that her support of the gay community had inspired him to finally come out to his family. In an interview with News.com.au, Coulter said that she believes people have forgotten she can sing because the vocals on her comeback album, Fear & Freedom (2012), were not as "front and centre" like her earlier releases. She intended for "All We Need Is Love" to remind people that she can sing, saying, "I wanted to be able to strip it all back and take everyone back to the very beginning when they met me ten years ago on [Australian] Idol and the reason they embraced me was because of my voice."

== Release and reception ==
An audio teaser of "All We Need Is Love" was uploaded to Coulter's YouTube account on 13 April 2014, and the full song premiered on Australian radio stations the following day. It was released as a digital extended play (EP) on 2 May 2014; it features a B-side track titled "Happy Ever After", an acoustic cover of Avicii's "Wake Me Up", as well as acoustic and remix versions of "All We Need Is Love". The song served as the lead single from Coulter's fourth studio album, Dance in the Rain.

After hearing the track, News.com.au wrote that "Coulter has reclaimed the powerful pop voice which launched her on Australian Idol a decade ago." Take 40 Australia described it as a "positive song." Stephanie Tell of The Music awarded "All We Need Is Love" two-and-a-half stars and wrote that it sounds like "the generic, catchy pop we've come to expect" from Coulter. She concluded that the track "perfects its tried-and-true brand of wholesome dance stylings, building dutifully to a satisfying chorus." Upon its release, "All We Need Is Love" debuted at number 39 on the ARIA Singles Chart issue dated 12 May 2014. In its second week, the song dropped fifty-nine spots to number 98.

== Promotion ==
In April–May 2014, Coulter was the supporting act for Jason Derulo's Australian leg of his Tattoos World Tour, where she performed "All We Need Is Love" as part of her set list. On 5 May 2014, Coulter performed the song on Sunrise as part of their "Sunrise Street Party" in Jamisontown, New South Wales. She also performed acoustic versions of "All We Need Is Love" on The Dan & Maz Show (7 May 2014) and Mornings (19 May 2014), and promoted the song during television interviews on The Riff (13 May 2014) and The Daily Edition (14 May 2014).

=== Music video ===
The music video was directed by Melvin J. Montalban and filmed in Sydney in April 2014. A behind-the-scenes video of the shoot was posted on YouTube on 1 May 2014, and shown on Sunrise the following day. The official video clip premiered exclusively on Scoopla.com on 9 May 2014. The video features three stories about love. The first is about a "young man telling his father he is gay and gaining acceptance" and the second is about "a boy at school who stands up to his bullies with his dance moves and wins their respect." The third story is about a woman (played by Coulter) who is training for a marathon "which ends up being a fundraiser for her seriously ill sister in hospital." Take 40 Australia called it "a gorgeous video" and said "it made everyone in the Take 40 office shed a tear with its inspirational message."

== Track listing ==
- Digital EP
1. "All We Need Is Love" – 3:16
2. "Happy Ever After" – 4:03
3. "Wake Me Up" (Acoustic) – 4:21
4. "All We Need Is Love" (Acoustic) – 3:33
5. "All We Need Is Love" (Minx Remix) – 4:39

== Charts ==
Chart (2014)	Peak position
Australia (ARIA)	39

== Release history ==
Country	Date	Format	Label
Australia	14 April 2014	Radio premiere	EMI Music Australia
Australia	2 May 2014	Digital EP	EMI Music Australia
