= Fraxin =

Names
- IUPAC name 8-(β-D-Glucopyranosyloxy)-7-hydroxy-6-methoxy-2H-1-benzopyran-2-one
- Systematic IUPAC name 7-Hydroxy-6-methoxy-8-{[(2S,3R,4S,5S,6R)-3,4,5-trihydroxy-6-(hydroxymethyl)oxan-2-yl]oxy}-2H-1-benzopyran-2-one

Identifiers
CAS Number	524-30-1
3D model (JSmol)	Interactive image
ChEBI	CHEBI:5170
ChemSpider	4437971
ECHA InfoCard	100.007.597
PubChem CID	5273568
UNII	V7M270Y072
CompTox Dashboard (EPA)	DTXSID30200410
- InChI: InChI=1S/C16H18O10/c1-23-7-4-6-2-3-9(18)25-14(6)15(11(7)20)26-16-13(22)12(21)10(19)8(5-17)24-16/h2-4,8,10,12-13,16-17,19-22H,5H2,1H3/t8-,10-,12+,13-,16+/m1/s1 Key: CRSFLLTWRCYNNX-QBNNUVSCSA-N; InChI=1/C16H18O10/c1-23-7-4-6-2-3-9(18)25-14(6)15(11(7)20)26-16-13(22)12(21)10(19)8(5-17)24-16/h2-4,8,10,12-13,16-17,19-22H,5H2,1H3/t8-,10-,12+,13-,16+/m1/s1 Key: CRSFLLTWRCYNNX-QBNNUVSCBJ
- SMILES: COc1cc2ccc(=O)oc2c(c1O)O[C@H]3[C@@H]([C@H]([C@@H]([C@H](O3)CO)O)O)O

Properties
Chemical formula	C_{16}H_{18}O_{10}
Molar mass	370.310 g·mol^{−1}
- Except where otherwise noted, data are given for materials in their standard state (at 25 °C [77 °F], 100 kPa). Infobox references

Fraxin is a glucoside of fraxetin. Fraxin extracted from ash bark exhibits fluorescence in aqueous solution. A blue/green luminescence can be observed by soaking ash twigs in hot water.
