= Fraxetin =

Names
- Preferred IUPAC name 7,8-Dihydroxy-6-methoxy-2H-1-benzopyran-2-one
- Other names 7,8-Dihydroxy-6-methoxycoumarin

Identifiers
CAS Number	574-84-5
3D model (JSmol)	Interactive image
ChEBI	CHEBI:5169
ChemSpider	4437972
ECHA InfoCard	100.008.525
EC Number	209-376-2
KEGG	C09265
PubChem CID	5273569
UNII	CD3GD44O3K
CompTox Dashboard (EPA)	DTXSID00205992
- InChI: InChI=1S/C10H8O5/c1-14-6-4-5-2-3-7(11)15-10(5)9(13)8(6)12/h2-4,12-13H,1H3 Key: HAVWRBANWNTOJX-UHFFFAOYSA-N; InChI=1/C10H8O5/c1-14-6-4-5-2-3-7(11)15-10(5)9(13)8(6)12/h2-4,12-13H,1H3 Key: HAVWRBANWNTOJX-UHFFFAOYAM
- SMILES: COC1=C(C(=C2C(=C1)C=CC(=O)O2)O)O

Properties
Chemical formula	C_{10}H_{8}O_{5}
Molar mass	208.169 g·mol^{−1}
- Except where otherwise noted, data are given for materials in their standard state (at 25 °C [77 °F], 100 kPa). Infobox references

Fraxetin is an O-methylated coumarin. It can be found in Fraxinus rhynchophylla and seeds of Datura stramonium. Fraxin is a glucoside of fraxetin.
