= Phellibaumin =

Phellibaumins are hispidin derivatives isolated from the fungus Phellinus. Five such derivatives have been identified, designated as phellibaumins A through E. Phellibaumins A and B are classified as pyranones, while phellibaumins C, D, and E are classified as styrylpyranones.

Phellibaumin A was also identified as being produced by the fungus Inonotus hispidus, and phellibaumins B and C were identified in Sanghuangporus vaninii. Phellibaumin E is of interest to medical researchers due to potential anti-dementia effects.

== Chemical structures ==
Phellibaumin A

Phellibaumin B

Phellibaumin C

Phellibaumin D

Phellibaumin E
