= Hispidin =

- Chemical structure of hispidin

Names
- Preferred IUPAC name 6-[(1E)-2-(3,4-Dihydroxyphenyl)ethen-1-yl]-4-hydroxy-2H-pyran-2-one
- Other names 6-(3,4-Dihydroxystyryl)-4-hydroxy-2-pyrone

Identifiers
CAS Number	555-55-5
3D model (JSmol)	Interactive image; Interactive image
ChemSpider	13975015
PubChem CID	5353671
UNII	SSJ18CG55E
CompTox Dashboard (EPA)	DTXSID401017256
- InChI: InChI=1S/C13H10O5/c14-9-6-10(18-13(17)7-9)3-1-8-2-4-11(15)12(16)5-8/h1-7,14-16H/b3-1+ Key: SGJNQVTUYXCBKH-HNQUOIGGSA-N
- SMILES: C1=CC(=C(C=C1/C=C/C2=CC(=CC(=O)O2)O)O)O; OC=2/C=C(/C=C/c1ccc(O)c(O)c1)OC(=O)C=2

Properties
Chemical formula	C_{13}H_{10}O_{5}
Molar mass	246.218 g·mol^{−1}
- Except where otherwise noted, data are given for materials in their standard state (at 25 °C [77 °F], 100 kPa). verify (what is ?) Infobox references

Hispidin is a natural substance. It can also be synthesized.

Hispidin 4-O-β-D-glucopyranoside can be found in Pteris ensiformis whereas hispidin derivatives, such as phellibaumins, can be found in the edible mushroom Inonotus xeranticus or Phellinus. Hispidin is a precursor of fungal luciferin, a compound responsible for light emission by luminous mushrooms.

== See also ==
- Davallialactone
- Phellibaumin
