= Davallialactone =

Names
- IUPAC name 6-[(E)-2-(3,4-dihydroxyphenyl)ethenyl]-3-[(2S,3R)-2-(3,4-dihydroxyphenyl)-6-methyl-4-oxo-2,3-dihydropyran-3-yl]-4-hydroxypyran-2-one

Identifiers
CAS Number	133360-41-5
3D model (JSmol)	Interactive image
ChemSpider	23269604
PubChem CID	54715402
- InChI: InChI=1S/C25H20O9/c1-12-8-20(30)22(24(33-12)14-4-7-17(27)19(29)10-14)23-21(31)11-15(34-25(23)32)5-2-13-3-6-16(26)18(28)9-13/h2-11,22,24,26-29,31H,1H3/b5-2+/t22-,24-/m1/s1 Key: KYFXISLAEBFZFO-NJPHHMIOSA-N
- SMILES: CC1=CC(=O)[C@@H]([C@H](O1)C2=CC(=C(C=C2)O)O)C3=C(C=C(OC3=O)/C=C/C4=CC(=C(C=C4)O)O)O

Properties
Chemical formula	C_{25}H_{20}O_{9}
Molar mass	464.426 g·mol^{−1}
- Except where otherwise noted, data are given for materials in their standard state (at 25 °C [77 °F], 100 kPa). Infobox references

Davallialactone is a hispidin analog isolated from fungi in the genus Inonotus.
