= Scammonin I =

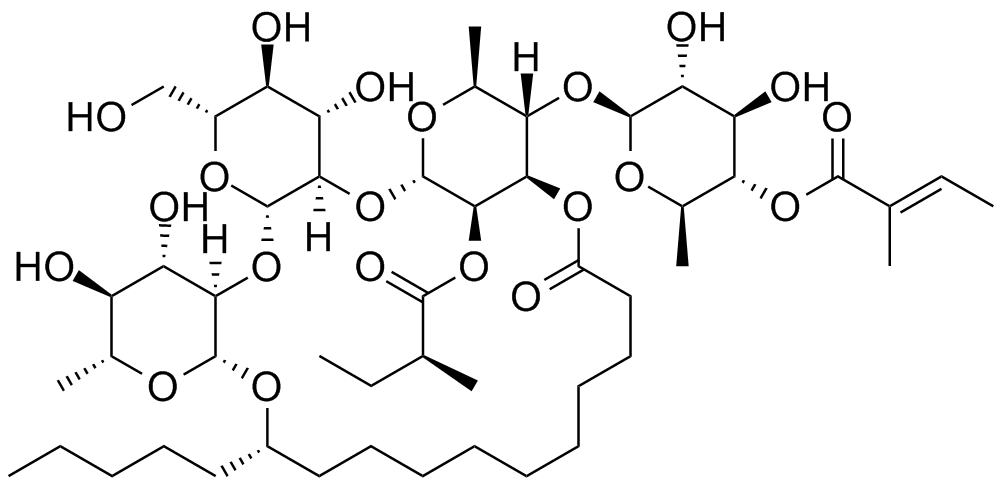

Names
- IUPAC name Hexadecanoic acid, 11-((O-(E)-6-deoxy-4-O-(2-methyl-1-oxo-2-butenyl)-β-D-glucopyranosyl-(1→4)-O-(S)-6-deoxy-2-O-(2-methyl-1-oxobutyl)-α-L-mannopyranosyl-(1→2)-O-β-D-glucopyranosyl-(1→2)-6-deoxy-beta-D-glucopyranosyl))
- Other names Jalapin, Scammonium

Identifiers
CAS Number	131747-25-6
3D model (JSmol)	Interactive image
ChemSpider	23339064
PubChem CID	44593484
- InChI: InChI=1S/C50H84O21/c1-9-12-18-21-30-22-19-16-14-13-15-17-20-23-32(52)66-43-40(69-47-38(58)37(57)39(28(7)62-47)67-45(59)25(4)10-2)29(8)63-50(44(43)68-46(60)26(5)11-3)71-42-36(56)34(54)31(24-51)65-49(42)70-41-35(55)33(53)27(6)61-48(41)64-30/h10,26-31,33-44,47-51,53-58H,9,11-24H2,1-8H3/b25-10+/t26-,27+,28+,29-,30-,31+,33+,34+,35-,36-,37+,38+,39+,40-,41+,42+,43+,44+,47-,48-,49-,50-/m0/s1 Key: DGRGOOVTCYVEDQ-GHYHFUIZSA-N
- SMILES: O=C(CCCCCCCCC[C@H](CCCCC)O[C@H]1[C@@]2([H])[C@@H](O)[C@H](O)[C@@H](C)O1)O[C@H]([C@](O[C@@H]3O[C@H](C)[C@@H](OC(/C(C)=C/C)=O)[C@H](O)[C@H]3O)([H])[C@H](C)O4)[C@@H](OC([C@H](CC)C)=O)[C@@H]4O[C@@]5([H])[C@H](O2)O[C@H](CO)[C@@H](O)[C@@H]5O

Properties
Chemical formula	C_{50}H_{84}O_{21}
Molar mass	1021.201 g·mol^{−1}
- Except where otherwise noted, data are given for materials in their standard state (at 25 °C [77 °F], 100 kPa). verify (what is ?) Infobox references

Scammonin (also known as jalapin or scammonium) is a lipid glycoside that has been isolated from Ipomoea purga (jalap or John the Conqueror root) and from Convolvulus scammonia (scammony).
