= Salicyl-alcohol beta-D-glucosyltransferase =

Class of enzymes

Identifiers
- EC no.: 2.4.1.172
- CAS no.: 89400-32-8

Databases
- IntEnz: IntEnz view
- BRENDA: BRENDA entry
- ExPASy: NiceZyme view
- KEGG: KEGG entry
- MetaCyc: metabolic pathway
- PRIAM: profile
- PDB structures: RCSB PDB PDBe PDBsum
- Gene Ontology: AmiGO / QuickGO
Search
- PMC: articles
- PubMed: articles
- NCBI: proteins

Salicyl-alcohol beta-D-glucosyltransferase (EC 2.4.1.172) is an enzyme that catalyzes the chemical reaction

salicyl alcohol
+ UDP-glucose
UDP
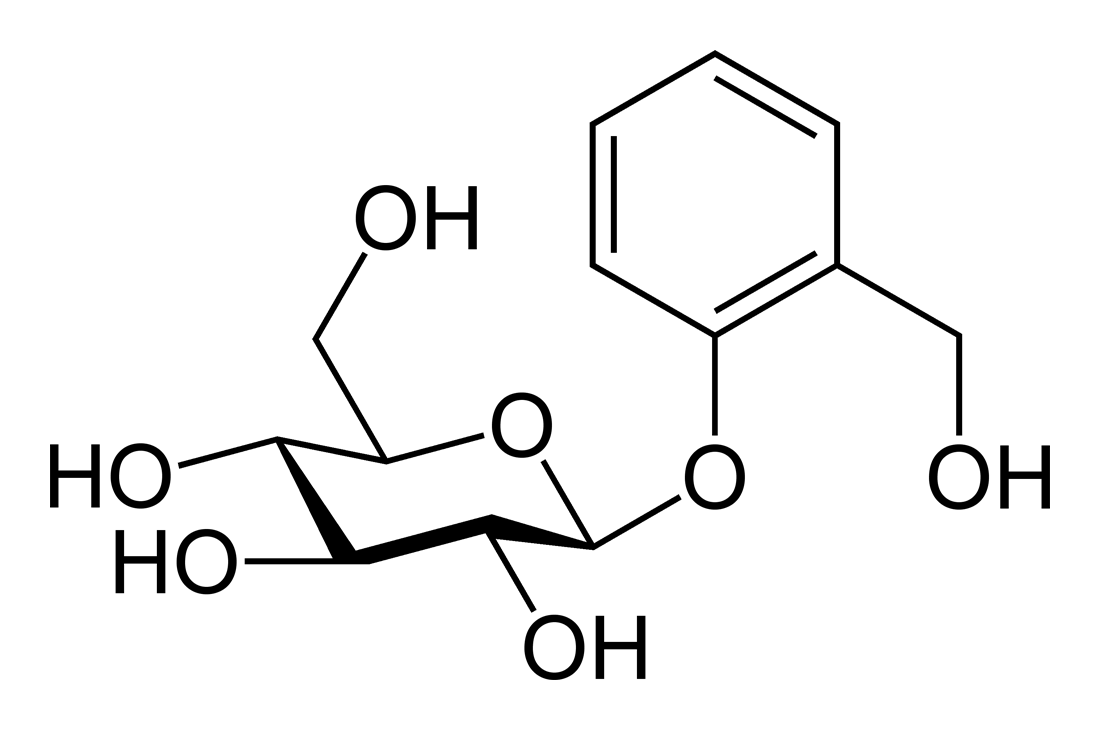
salicin

The two substrates of this enzyme characterised from Gardenia jasminoides are salicyl alcohol and UDP-glucose. Its products are salicin and uridine diphosphate (UDP).

This enzyme belongs to the family of glycosyltransferases, specifically the hexosyltransferases. The systematic name of this enzyme class is UDP-glucose:salicyl-alcohol beta-D-glucosyltransferase. Other names in common use include uridine diphosphoglucose-salicyl alcohol 2-glucosyltransferase, and UDPglucose:salicyl alcohol phenyl-glucosyltransferase.
