= Helicin =

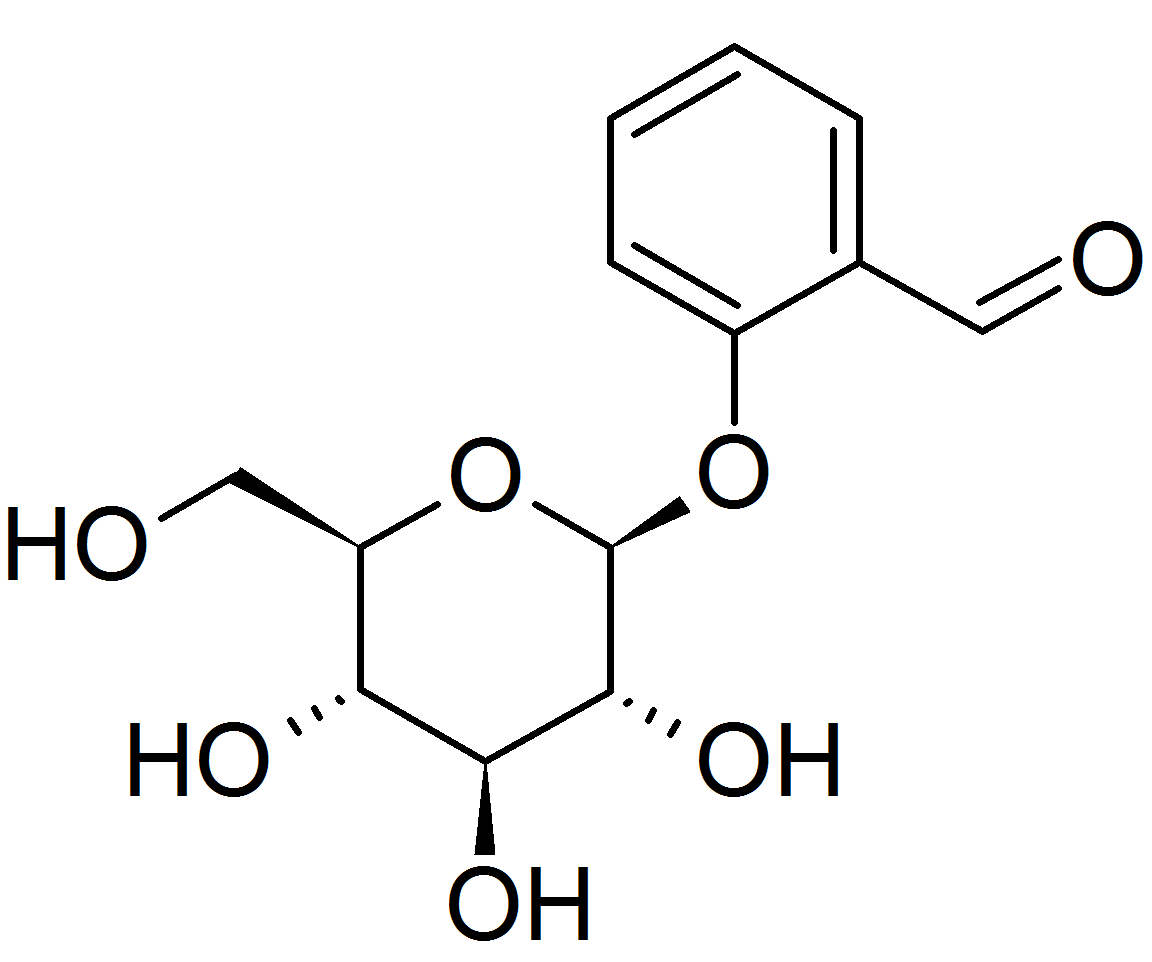

Names
- IUPAC name 2-(β-D-Glucopyranosyloxy)benzaldehyde
- Systematic IUPAC name 2-{[(2S,3R,4S,5S,6R)-3,4,5-Trihydroxy-6-(hydroxymethyl)oxan-2-yl]oxy}benzaldehyde

Identifiers
CAS Number	618-65-5
3D model (JSmol)	Interactive image
ChemSpider	91979
ECHA InfoCard	100.009.600
PubChem CID	101799
UNII	6N4TI8P9R5
CompTox Dashboard (EPA)	DTXSID20877231
- InChI: InChI=1S/C13H16O7/c14-5-7-3-1-2-4-8(7)19-13-12(18)11(17)10(16)9(6-15)20- 13/h1-5,9-13,15-18H,6H2/t9-,10-,11+,12-,13-/m1/s1 Key: BGOFCVIGEYGEOF-UJPOAAIJSA-N
- SMILES: C1=CC=C(C(=C1)C=O)O[C@H]2[C@@H]([C@H]([C@@H]([C@H](O2)CO)O)O)O

Properties
Chemical formula	C_{13}H_{16}O_{7}
Molar mass	284.264 g·mol^{−1}
- Except where otherwise noted, data are given for materials in their standard state (at 25 °C [77 °F], 100 kPa). Infobox references

Helicin is the O-glucoside of salicylaldehyde.
