= In the Mood (Ricki-Lee song) =

Song by Ricki-Lee Coulter

from the album Dance in the Rain
- Recorded: 2013
- Genre: Dance-pop
- Length: 2:40
- Label: EMI
- Songwriters: Ricki-Lee Coulter; Stuart Crichton; Brian Lee

Lyric video
- "In the Mood" on YouTube

"In the Mood" is a song recorded by Australian singer-songwriter Ricki-Lee Coulter for her fourth studio album Dance in the Rain. It was written by Coulter, Stuart Crichton and Brian Lee. Following the album's iTunes pre-order release, "In the Mood" debuted at number 97 on the ARIA Singles Chart.

== Background and release ==
"In the Mood" was written by Ricki-Lee Coulter, Stuart Crichton and Brian Lee. During the summer of 2013, Coulter rented a house in Whale Beach, New South Wales and invited Crichton and Lee over to write songs with her. Together they "setup a makeshift studio in the house" and wrote four songs, including "In the Mood". Coulter spoke about the writing sessions on her website, saying: "We drank, we danced, we wrote, we had fun and we were surrounded by friends and good vibes." On 19 September 2014, "In the Mood" was made available to download alongside the iTunes pre-order of Coulter's fourth studio album Dance in the Rain. Fans who pre-ordered the album on iTunes would instantly receive the song for free. Cameron Adams of the Herald Sun described "In the Mood" as "anthemic and athletic". For the issue dated 29 September 2014, "In the Mood" debuted at number 97 on the ARIA Singles Chart.

== Promotion and usage in media ==
A lyric video of "In the Mood" was directed by David Boyce and King Yong, and uploaded to Coulter's Vevo account on 19 September 2014. She performed the song at Nickelodeon Australia's third annual Slimefest concert in Sydney on 26 September 2014. In late 2014, "In the Mood" was used on the US version of Dancing with the Stars.

== Charts ==
Chart (2014)	Peak position
Australia (ARIA)	97
