= In the Mood (TV program) =

Canadian music variety show

- Genre: Variety
- Written by: Garry Ferrier; Aubrey Tadman
- Directed by: Athan Katsos
- Presented by: Jack Duffy
- Country of origin: Canada
- Original language: English
- No. of seasons: 1

Production
- Producers: Garry Ferrier; Aubrey Tadman
- Running time: 30 minutes

Original release
- Network: CBC Television
- Release: 16 September 1971 – 29 June 1972

In the Mood is a Canadian music variety show that aired on CBC Television from 1971 to 1972.

== Premise ==
Big band styles of music were featured in this variety show hosted by Jack Duffy. The program's regular band was led by Guido Basso. Episodes featured guest musicians and a particular theme, such as the debut which featured Glenn Miller's brand of music and guests Tex Beneke and The Modernaires.

== Scheduling ==
This half-hour program was broadcast on Thursday evenings from 16 September 1971 to 29 June 1972. The initial time slot was 9:00 p.m. (Eastern) until January 1972 when it moved to 7:30 p.m. for the remainder of the series (except for two 9 p.m. broadcasts for the first two weeks of April 1972).

Episodes were repeated from 13 July to 14 September 1974 on Saturday nights at 10:30 p.m.
