= Benzoyl-β-D-glucoside =

Benzoyl-β-d-glucoside
- Chemical structure of benzoyl-beta-D-glucoside

Names
- IUPAC name β-D-Glucopyranosyl benzoate
- Systematic IUPAC name [(2S,3R,4S,5S,6R)-3,4,5-Trihydroxy-6-(hydroxymethyl)oxan-2-yl] benzoate

Identifiers
CAS Number	21056-52-0
3D model (JSmol)	Interactive image
ChemSpider	18620219
PubChem CID	12314096
UNII	U2X7G335QH
CompTox Dashboard (EPA)	DTXSID40943366
- InChI: InChI=1S/C13H16O7/c14-6-8-9(15)10(16)11(17)13(19-8)20-12(18)7-4-2-1-3-5-7/h1-5,8-11,13-17H,6H2/t8-,9-,10+,11-,13+/m1/s1 Key: LVFCLUMIBMHAFL-HMUNZLOLSA-N; InChI=1/C13H16O7/c14-6-8-9(15)10(16)11(17)13(19-8)20-12(18)7-4-2-1-3-5-7/h1-5,8-11,13-17H,6H2/t8-,9-,10+,11-,13+/m1/s1 Key: LVFCLUMIBMHAFL-HMUNZLOLBZ
- SMILES: O=C(O[C@@H]1O[C@H](CO)[C@@H](O)[C@H](O)[C@H]1O)c2ccccc2

Properties
Chemical formula	C_{13}H_{16}O_{7}
Molar mass	284.264 g·mol^{−1}
- Except where otherwise noted, data are given for materials in their standard state (at 25 °C [77 °F], 100 kPa). verify (what is ?) Infobox references

Benzoyl-β-d-glucoside is a benzoyl glucoside, a natural substance that can be found in Pteris ensiformis.
