= MadameNoire =

Online magazine focused on African-American women

- Website type: Online magazine
- Available in: English
- Website: madamenoire.com
- Launched: 2010; 16 years ago
- Current status: Active

MadameNoire is an international online magazine that is geared toward the lifestyles of African-American women as well as popular culture.

In 2015, MadameNoire had 7,116,000 unique visitors monthly, making it the most trafficked site oriented to African Americans—ahead of The Root, BET.com, and Bossip.com.

The site also has a radio partnership with Café Mocha.

Staff includes Brande Victorian, deputy editor, Courtney Whitaker, weekend editor; and LaShaun Williams, culture and parenting columnist.

MadameNoire was owned by Moguldom Media Group at the time of its 2010 launch. In 2012, Moguldom folded the Atlanta Post (which published from 2008 to 2012) into MadameNoire.

In 2017, iOne Digital, a division of Urban One, Inc., acquired MadameNoire, along with Bossip.com and Hip-Hop Wired. The acquisition helped iOne Digital become one of the largest black digital content providers in the U.S.
