= Salicin =

Chemical compound

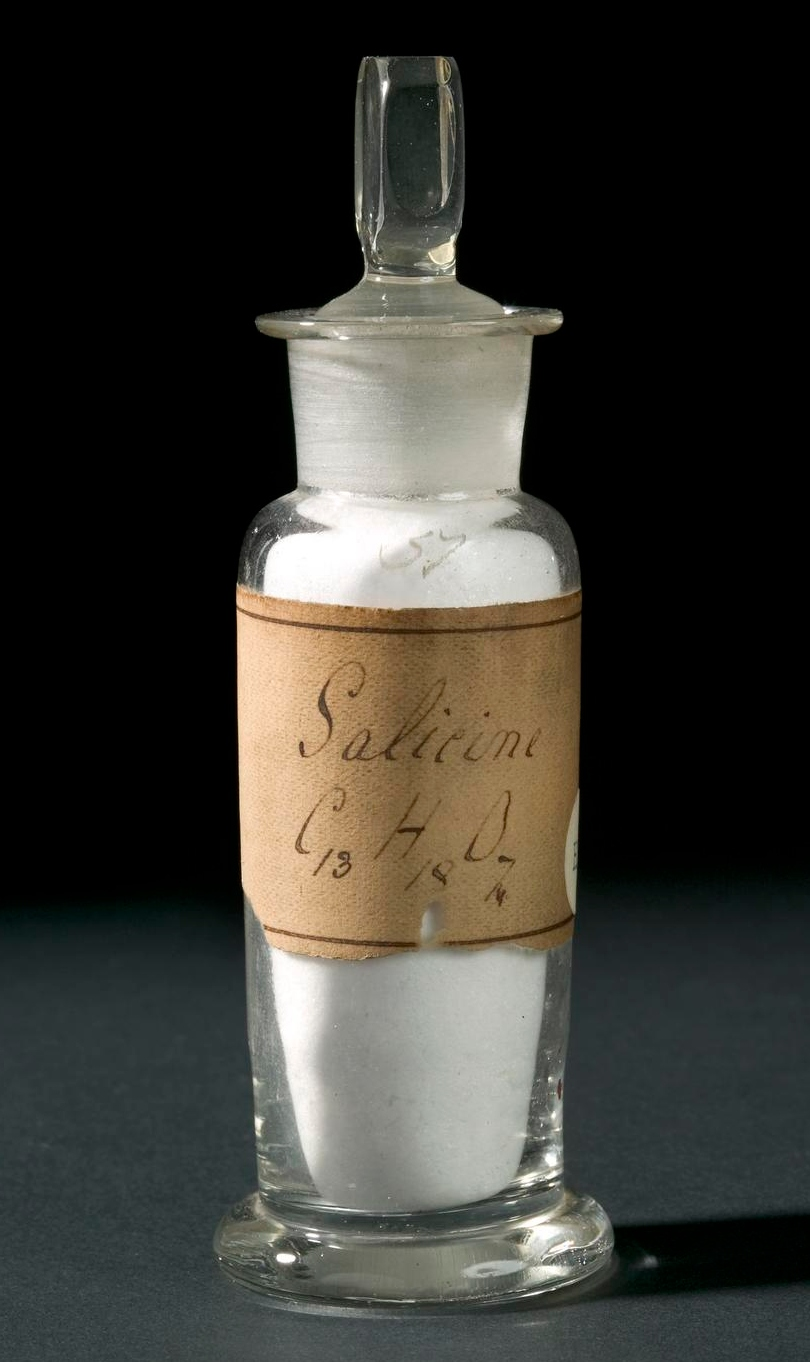

Names
- IUPAC name 2-(Hydroxymethyl)phenyl β-D-glucopyranoside
- Systematic IUPAC name (2R,3S,4S,5R,6S)-2-(Hydroxymethyl)-6-[2-(hydroxymethyl)phenoxy]oxane-3,4,5-triol
- Other names Salicin; D-(−)-Salicin; Salicoside

Identifiers
CAS Number	138-52-3
3D model (JSmol)	Interactive image
Abbreviations	Glc(b)-O-Ph(2-CH2OH)
ChemSpider	388601
ECHA InfoCard	100.004.847
KEGG	C01451
PubChem CID	439503
RTECS number	LZ5901700
UNII	4649620TBZ
CompTox Dashboard (EPA)	DTXSID10883326
- InChI: InChI=1/C13H18O7/c14/h1-4,9-18H,5-6H2
- SMILES: OCc1ccccc1O[C@@H]1O[C@H](CO)[C@@H](O)[C@H](O)[C@H]1O

Properties
Chemical formula	C_{13}H_{18}O_{7}
Molar mass	286.280 g·mol^{−1}
Appearance	White crystals
Density	1.434 g/cm^{3}
Melting point	207 °C (405 °F; 480 K)
Boiling point	240 decomp.
Solubility in water	43 g/L
Solubility in Ethanol	3 g/L
Solubility in DMSO	20 g/L
Solubility in dimethyl formamide	30 g/L

Hazards
- Occupational safety and health (OHS/OSH)
Main hazards	Skin sensitizer / Contact dermatitis
- GHS labelling
Pictograms	(GHS07: Exclamation mark)
Signal word	Warning
Hazard statements	H317
Precautionary statements	P261, P272, P280, P302+P352, P333+P313, P362, P363, P501
NFPA 704 (fire diamond)	1 0 0
- Except where otherwise noted, data are given for materials in their standard state (at 25 °C [77 °F], 100 kPa). verify (what is ?) Infobox references

Salicin is an alcoholic β-glucoside. Salicin is produced in (and named after) willow (Salix) bark. It is a biosynthetic precursor to salicylaldehyde.

Salicin hydrolyses into β-d-glucose and salicyl alcohol (saligenin). Salicyl alcohol can be oxidized into salicylaldehyde and salicylate, both biologically and industrially.

== Biosynthesis ==
The enzyme salicyl-alcohol beta-D-glucosyltransferase characterised from Gardenia jasminoides produces salicin from salicyl alcohol and UDP-glucose, with uridine diphosphate (UDP) as byproduct.

salicyl alcohol
+ UDP-glucose
UDP
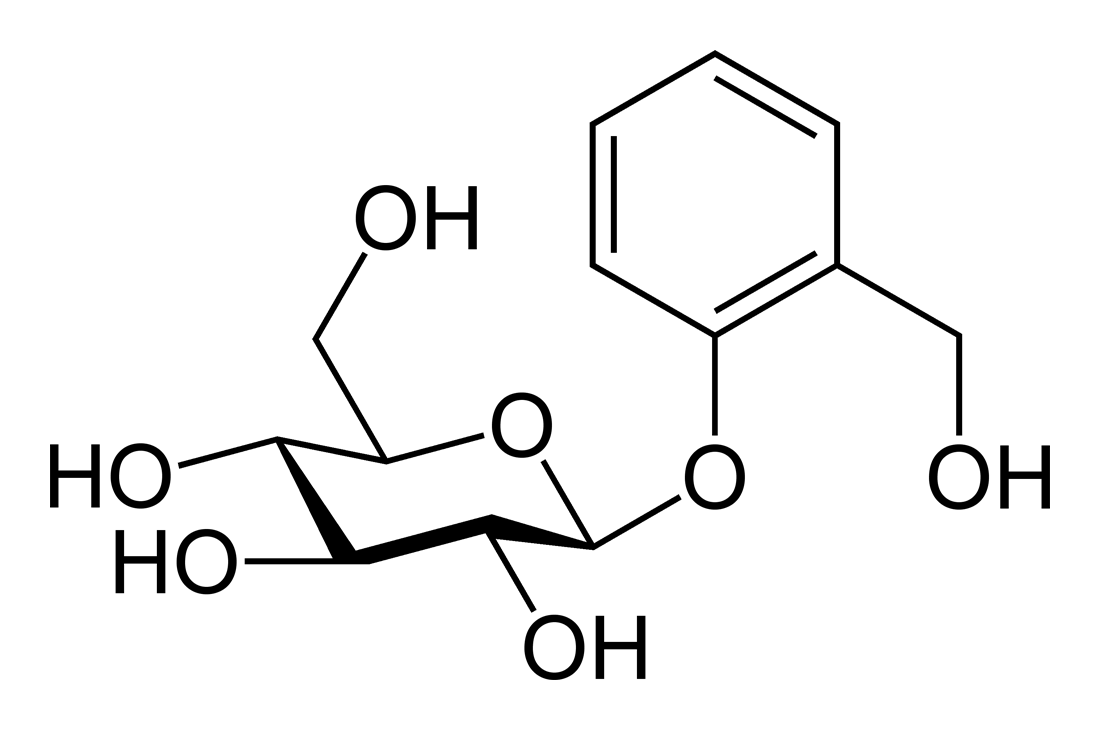
salicin

== Medicinal aspects ==
Salicin is found in the bark of and leaves of willows, poplars and various other plants. Derivates are found in castoreum. Salicin from meadowsweet was used in the synthesis of aspirin (acetylsalicylic acid), in 1899 by scientists at Bayer. Salicin tastes bitter like quinine.

Salicin may cause an allergic skin reaction (skin sensitization; category 1).

Mild side effects are standard, with rare occurrences of nausea, vomiting, rash, dizziness and breathing problems. Overdose from high quantities of salicin can be toxic, damaging kidneys, causing stomach ulcers, diarrhea, bleeding or digestive discomfort. Some people may be allergic or sensitive to salicylates and suffer reactions similar to those produced by aspirin. People should not take salicin if they have asthma, diabetes, gout, gastritis, hemophilia, stomach ulcers; also contraindicated are children under 16, and pregnant and breastfeeding women.
