= Fan Fair (EP) =

EP by Baiyu
- Released: April 15, 2011
- Recorded: 2010–2011
- Genre: Contemporary R&B, pop, indie pop
- Length: 21:15
- Producer: KQuick, Baiyu (executive)

Singles from Fan Fair
- 1. "Take a Number" Released: November 2, 2010; 2. "Together" Released: May 18, 2011

Fan Fair is a five song extended play by Chinese-American artist Baiyu released on April 15, 2011. In releasing the project, Baiyu also announced her decision to donate all profits from "Fan Fair" towards Japanese earthquake and tsunami relief via the Japanese Red Cross. "Fan Fair" began to generate buzz almost immediately upon release, and her single "Take a Number" featuring Fred the Godson received airplay on Hot 97 along with numerous college radio stations. Her music video for the second single "Together" premiered on MTV Networks' Logo TV in August 2011. Subsequently, the video also got picked up by MTV UK, MTV Latin America, MTV Canada, MTV España, MTV Brasil, and VH1 Latin America among other television stations. She was since then been featured in Celebuzz, GlobalGrind, TheSource, MTVIggy, SoulTrain.com, and various other blogs and magazines. "Fan Fair" hit over 200,000 downloads via the Frostwire platform. The album was produced in conjunction with KQuick of Grand Staff LLC, who is known for his work with artists such as Ryan Leslie, Chris Brown, Fabolous, and Mýa; and is Baiyu's introductory project in working with KQuick.

According to Baiyu's website, "Fan Fair" is titled as such "because this album is really for you... the one that's stuck by me through thick and thin, and told me that I could do anything I set my heart out to do. You're the one that pushed me to create, to be inspired and to be inspiring. Therefore, my thank you comes in the form of song, and these songs are made for your pure, unadulterated enjoyment." She also reiterates that "on a more serious note", there is "a heartfelt reason why although Fan Fair is meant to be a free download, you also have the option to donate any amount that you'd like towards the project with no minimum. No, this donation is not for me - it's for a much bigger cause. The tsunami and earthquake tragedy in Japan has, and continues to impact so many people that I couldn't just stand by without at least trying to make a difference. With that said, 100% of the proceeds from Fan Fair will go towards Japanese aid relief organizations. This way, not only do I get to share my music with you, we get to share a little bit of love and support to the people of Japan." She ends by telling her fans and the people of Japan that "You are my heart..." "Fan Fair" is yet another leap in Baiyu's philanthropic efforts.

== Track listing ==
No.	Title	Writer(s)	Producer(s)	Length
1.	"Take A Number (ft. Fred the Godson)"	Baiyu; KQuick	KQuick	3:29
2.	"Secret Lover"	Baiyu; KQuick	KQuick	3:30
3.	"Together"	Baiyu; KQuick	KQuick	3:42
4.	"Gone"	Baiyu; KQuick	KQuick	3:19
5.	"Alter Ego"	Baiyu; KQuick	KQuick	3:33
Total length:				21:15

All credits adapted from the included digital booklet.
