= In the Mood (EP) =

EP by Shaggy
- Released: May 12, 2023
- Recorded: 2022–2023
- Label: VP; Ranch Entertainment
- Producer: Shaggy; Shane Hoosong; Tony Kelly

Shaggy chronology
Com Fly wid Mi (2022)	In the Mood (2023)

Singles from In the Mood
- 1. "Mood" Released: December 20, 2022

In the Mood is the first extended play by Shaggy. A soca-inspired EP, it was released on May 12, 2023, by VP Records. The EP features Kees from Kes, Patrice Roberts, Bunji Garlin, Skinny Fabulous, the Grenadines, Konshens, Noah Powa, and Future Fambo. With a total of 7 tracks and a total duration of 22:13, the EP blends the soca, EDM, and dancehall genres.

== Background ==
In the Mood is a joint release with VP Records and Ranch Entertainment. The first single from the EP was "Mood". The idea to create a soca song came after Shaggy finished writing the song "Mood" during the pandemic, and the track's feel-good vibes led him to write in a different direction. Shaggy made the EP to bring joy to people through his music, maintain a lighthearted and fun atmosphere, and explore the synergy between different genres, particularly soca.

The EP is a celebration of the Caribbean, portraying the vibrant and energetic spirit of the region through a fusion of genres. The track "Mood" embraces the carefree and enjoyable atmosphere of the Caribbean. "Buddy Bye" keeps the celebration going by applauding the captivating movement of the female derrière, adding to the happiness and excitement of the experience. "I Love Her" expresses admiration for a special lady who embodies the Caribbean's natural beauty. "Well Talented" portrays a cheerful and playful appreciation for the captivating dance moves that define Caribbean culture.

== Track listing ==
In the Mood track listing
No.	Title	Writer(s)	Producer(s)	Length
1.	"Mood" (featuring Kes)	Orville Burrell; Kees Dieffenthaller; Riad Boochoon; Hans Dieffenthaller; Jon Dieffenthaller; Shane Hoosong	Orville Burrell; Shane Hoosong	3:37
2.	"Buddy Bye" (featuring Konshens and Noah Powa)	Orville Burrell; Nohard Grant; Garfield Spence; Cheston Grossett; Shane Hoosong	Burrell; Hoosong	2:29
3.	"Whine & Jumping" (featuring Patrice Roberts)	Orville Burrell; Patrice Roberts; Shane Hoosong	Burrell; Hoosong	3:24
4.	"I Love Her"	Orville Burrell; Omar Thompson; Shane Hoosong	Burrell; Hoosong	2:46
5.	"Don't Run" (featuring Skinny Fabulous)	Orville Burrell; Gamal Omar Doyle; Ashante Reid; Ricardo Lloyd Johnson Jr.; Shane Hoosong	Burrell; Hoosong	3:23
6.	"Liquor Buss" (featuring Noah Powa and Future Fambo)	Orville Burrell; Nohard Gran; Warren Gladstone Williams; Omar Thompson; Shane Hoosong	Burrell; Hoosong	3:33
7.	"Well Talented" (featuring Bunji Garlin)	Orville Burrell; Tony Kelly; Ian Antonio Alvarez; Dean Patrick Thomas	Tony Kelly	3:01
Total length:				22:13
