= Salicyl alcohol =

Names
- Preferred IUPAC name 2-(Hydroxymethyl)phenol
- Other names 2-Hydroxybenzyl alcohol, Salicain, Diathesin, Saligenin, Saligenol, Salicyl alcohol, α,2-Toluenediol, o-Methylolphenol, 2-Methylolphenol, Salicylic alcohol

Identifiers
| CAS Number | 90-01-7 |
| 3D model (JSmol) | Interactive image |
| ChemSpider | 4962 |
| ECHA InfoCard | 100.001.782 |
| EC Number | 201-960-5 |
| PubChem CID | 5146 |
| UNII | FA1N0842KB |
| CompTox Dashboard (EPA) | DTXSID9045843 |
- InChI: InChI=1S/C7H8O2/c8-5-6-3-1-2-4-7(6)9/h1-4,8-9H,5H2 Key: CQRYARSYNCAZFO-UHFFFAOYSA-N
- SMILES: c1ccc(c(c1)CO)O

Properties
| Chemical formula | C_{7}H_{8}O_{2} |
| Molar mass | 124.139 g·mol^{−1} |
| Density | 1.16 g/cm^{3} |
| Melting point | 86 °C (187 °F; 359 K) |
| Boiling point | 267 °C (513 °F; 540 K) |
| Solubility in water | 67g/L at 22 °C |
| Magnetic susceptibility (χ) | −76.9·10^{−6} cm^{3}/mol |

Hazards
- GHS labelling
| Pictograms | (GHS07: Exclamation mark) |
| Signal word | Warning |
| Hazard statements | H315, H319, H335 |
| Precautionary statements | P261, P264, P271, P280, P302+P352, P304+P340, P305+P351+P338, P312, P321, P332+P313, P337+P313, P362, P403+P233, P405, P501 |
| Flash point | 134 °C |
- Except where otherwise noted, data are given for materials in their standard state (at 25 °C [77 °F], 100 kPa). Infobox references

Salicyl alcohol (saligenin) is an organic compound with the formula C_{6}HOH(CH_{2}OH. It is a white solid that is used as a precursor in organic synthesis.

== Synthesis and applications ==
Salicyl alcohol is produced by the hydroxymethylation of phenol using formaldehyde:

C_{6}H_{5}OH + CH_{2}O → C_{6}H_{4}OH(CH_{2}OH

Air oxidation of salicyl alcohol gives salicylaldehyde.

C_{6}H_{4}OH(CH_{2}OH + O → C_{6}H_{4}OH(CHO) +H_{2}O

Chemical sweeteners are formed by acetal formation with e.g. isovanillin (Cmp4).

Salicyl alcohol appears as a pharmacophore in several notable β2-adrenoceptor agonists (e.g. salbutamol), as well as in synthetic estrone analogs, e.g. CID:22940780 or CID:154236944.

== Biosynthesis ==
Salicyl alcohol is the precursor of salicylic acid. It is formed from salicin by enzymatic hydrolysis by Salicyl-alcohol beta-D-glucosyltransferase or by acid hydrolysis.

== See also ==
- Gastrodigenin (4-hydroxybenzyl alcohol)
- Discovery and development of beta2 agonists
