= I'm in the Mood for Love (disambiguation) =

I'm in the Mood for Love may refer to:

- "I'm in the Mood for Love," a 1935 popular song by Jimmy McHugh and Dorothy Fields
- A number of albums (mostly including the song):
  - I'm in the Mood for Love (Eddie Fisher album), a 1952 album by Eddie Fisher
  - I'm in the Mood for Love (Frances Langford album), a 1997 album by Frances Langford
  - I'm in the Mood for Love...The Most Romantic Melodies of All Time, a 2006 album by Kenny G.
