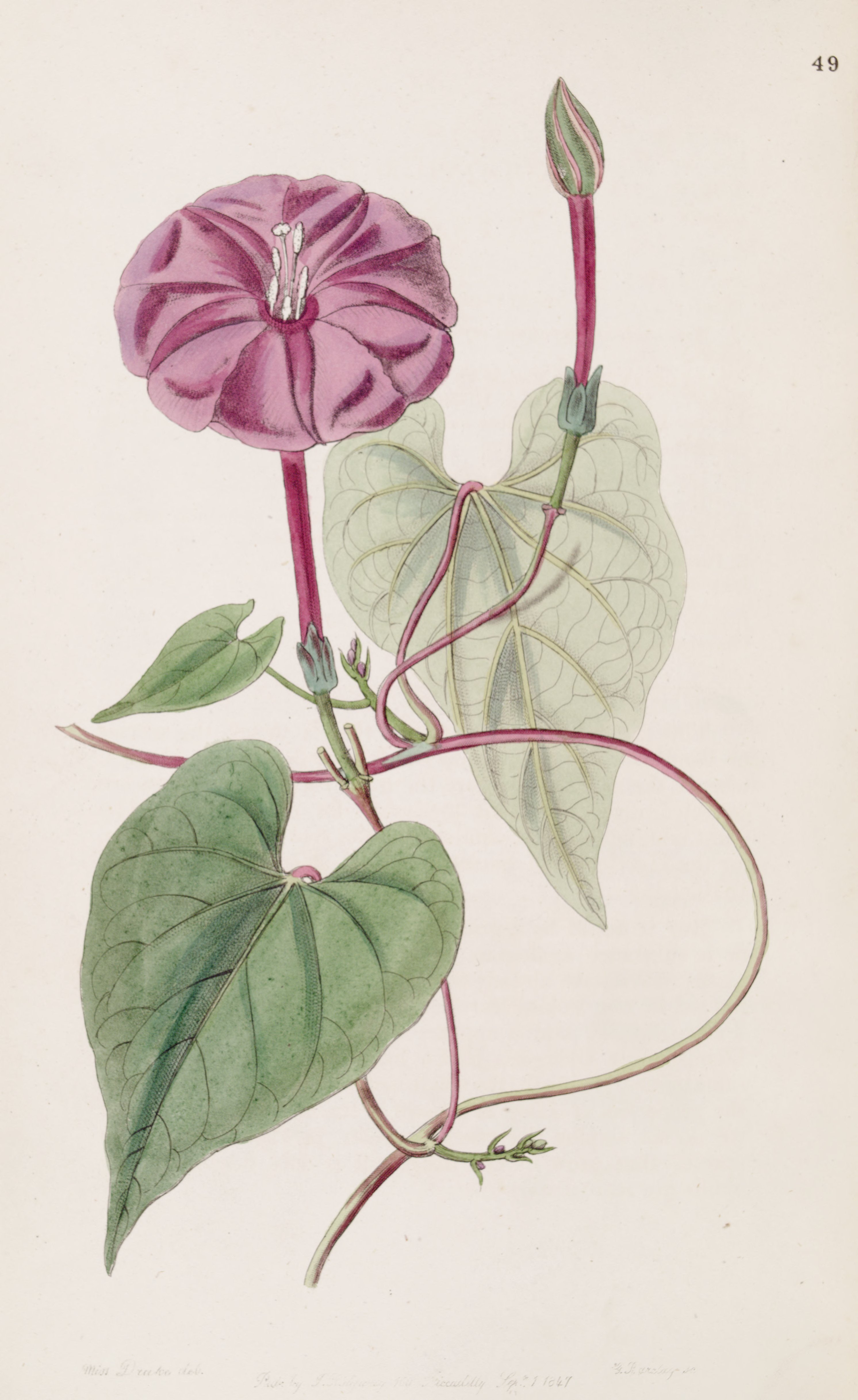

Scientific classification
- Kingdom: Plantae
- Clade: Embryophytes
- Clade: Tracheophytes
- Clade: Angiosperms
- Clade: Eudicots
- Clade: Asterids
- Order: Solanales
- Family: Convolvulaceae
- Genus: Ipomoea
- Species: I. purga

Binomial name
- Ipomoea purga (Wender.) Hayne

= Ipomoea purga =

Species of morning glory

Ipomoea purga is a species of flowering plant in the genus Ipomoea. It is commonly referred to as jalap and is probably also the source of the John the Conqueror amulet legend.

== Description ==
Ipomoea purga is described as a vine that can reach heights of 12 feet (3.7 m). When fresh, the root is black externally, white and milky within, and varies in size according to its age. It has heart shaped leaves and purple trumpet like flowers. Ipomoea purga is rather difficult to break down, but if triturated with cream of tartar, sugar of milk, or other hard salts, the process of pulverization is much easier, and the powder rendered much finer. When in powder form in order to ingest, the color is a pale grayish brown. Ipomoea purga is native to Mexico and it is naturalized in other parts of the neotropics.

== Discovery ==
Ipomoea purga was encountered by Spanish conquistadores during the conquest of Mexico. It was introduced to Europe in 1565 as a medical herb used to treat an array of illnesses up until the 19th century when modern medical practices became the norm.

== Medical uses ==
Called "mechoacán" and "mechoacan potato" by English explorers, the root contains a resin known as jalap, which is a powerful cathartic that causes intense vomiting and diarrhea that in rare cases proves fatal. When applied to a wound, it is said to induce purgation.

Ipomoea purga resin can be dissolved in either ethanol as a tincture or diethyl ether. The resin that is insoluble in ether is odorless while the resin soluble in alcohol does have an odor and is typically a brownish color. A substance with the chemical formula C_{28}H_{52}O_{14} that is produced in Ipomoea purga roots can be broken apart into a sugar molecule (C_{6}H_{12}O_{6}) and convolvulinolic acid (C_{16}H_{30}O_{3}).

== Synonyms ==
Basionym

- Convolvulus purga

Homotypic

- Exogonium purga

Heterotypic

- Convolvulus officinalis
- Ipomœa jalapa
- Ipomœa jalapa
- Ipomoea Schiedeana Zuccar

== Bibliography ==
=== References ===
- Chevallier, Andrew (1996). The Encyclopedia of Medicinal Plants. DK Pub. p. 222. ISBN 978-0-7894-1067-2 – via Internet Archive (Boston Public Library). LCCN 96-15192; ISBN 0-7894-1067-2, 0-7894-1067-2; OCLC 34513394 (all editions).
- Feiling, Tom [in Polish] (2018). The Island that Disappeared: The Lost History of the Mayflower's Sister Ship and Its Rival Puritan Colony (limited preview). Brooklyn and London: Melville House Publishing. p. 48 – via Google Books. LCCN 2017-55039 (reflowable ebook); LCCN 2019-716568 (hardcover); ISBN 978-1-6121-9708-1, 1612-1-9708-6; ISBN 978-1-6121-9410-3 (reflowable ebook); OCLC 992182707 (all editions).
- Don, George. A General System of Gardening and Botany. Founded Upon Miller's Gardener's Dictionary, and Arranged According to the Natural System. Issued also during the same years under other titles, including: A General History – Dichlamydeous Plants, Comprising Complete Descriptions of the Different Orders; Together With the Characters of the Genera and Species, and an Enumeration of the Cultivated Varieties; Their Places of Growth, Time of Flowering, Mode of Culture, and Uses in Medicine and Domestic Economy; The Scientific Names Accentuated, Their Etymologies Explained, and the Classes and Orders Illustrated by Engravings, and Preceded by Introductions to the Linnæan and Natural Systems, and a Glossary of the Terms Used: The Whole Arranged According to the Natural System (4 vols.). Printed for Charles James Gage Rivington and Francis Rivington (Rivington Publishers), et al. Retrieved July 2, 2024. OCLC 6825168 (all editions).
1. Schiede, Christian Julius Wilhelm (1798–1836); Deppe, Paul Ferdinand (1795–1861) (1838). "Ja'lapa". Vol. 4. p. 271 – via Internet Archive (North Carolina State University Libraries).
- "Ipomoea purga". Germplasm Resources Information Network. Agricultural Research Service, United States Department of Agriculture. Retrieved December 24, 2017.
- King, John (1905) [1898; 1854]. Felter, Harvey Wickes; Lloyd, John Uri (eds.). King's American Dispensatory (19th ed.; 3rd rev.; 2 Vols.; re: King's American Dispensatory). pp. 1083–1087 – via Internet Archive (University of Toronto). Retrieved December 2, 2013. LCCN 98-1036 (1898 ed.); OCLC 1153364973 (all editions).

.

- Nuttall, Thomas; Cox, T. (1830). "An Account of the Jalap Plant as An Ipomœa". The American Journal of the Medical Sciences (appended to a paper on the subject by Dr. R. Cox). 5: 305. ISSN 1538-2990 (Online)
  The name "Ipomoea jalapa" as used by Nuttall and Cox is considered illegitimate (nomen illegitimum = illegitimate name) because the valid publication of the name was made by Frederick Traugott Pursh in Curtis's Botanical Magazine → Plate 1572 → published by Samuel Curtis, Walworth. August 1, 1813. Initially, subsequent usage that did not follow the American Code of Botanical Nomenclature (compare → International Code of Nomenclature for algae, fungi, and plants) was not accepted. However, according to later formulated American Code of Botanical Nomenclature, the 1813 publication did not constitute publication of the name in a technical sense.
- Pelletan, Philippe Gabriel (1834). François Fulgis Chevallier; Antoine Laurent Apollinaire Fée; Nicolas-Jean-Baptiste-Gaston Guibourt; Jean-Sébastien-Eugène Julia de Fontenelle [in French]; Jean Louis Lassaigne; Mathieu Orfila; Anselme Payen; Gabriel Palletan; Théophile-Jules Pelouze; Achille Richard; Cora Millet-Robinet (eds.). "Note: Sur deux espèces de jalap du commerce" [Note: On Two Species of Commercial Jalap]. Journal de Chimie Médicale, de Pharmacie et de Toxicologie [Journal of Medical Chemistry, Pharmacy, and Toxicology] (in French). 10. Paris: fr:Faculté de médecine de Paris (University of Paris, School of Medicine). Béchet Jeune, Publisher. Félix Locquin, Printer: 1–22. Retrieved July 5, 2024. ISSN 0368-167X (journal); OCLC 13223903 (all editions) (journal); OCLC 1366386602 (all editions) (journal); OCLC 867256412 (all editions) (article).
1. Via HathiTrust (Harvard University).
2. Via Internet Archive (University of Michigan). Paris. 1825.
3. Google Books (Complutense University of Madrid).
4. Google Books. (Bavarian State Library).
Note: Philippe Gabriel Pelletan (1792–1879) was the son of Philippe-Jean Pelletan (1747–1829).
- Pursh, Frederick Traugott (1813). "Convolvulus Jalapa. The True Jalapa". Curtis's Botanical Magazine (plate 1572). 37. Sherwood, Neeley & Jones, Publisher. ISSN 0011-4073; OCLC 1355908 (all editions).
1. Via Internet Archive (Harvard). 1813.
2. Google Books (Austrian National Library).
- Species: Ipomoea purga – via Wikispecies.
- Wenderoth, Herrn Doktor Professor Georg Wilhelm Franz (November 1830). "Uberdie Abstammrung der Japalenwurzel" [On the Origin of the Japalen Root]. Pharmaceutisches Central-Blatt (presented from Marburg to the editorial office November 1, 1830) (in German). 1 (29): 456–458. Retrieved July 2, 2024. ISSN 2194-2064; OCLC 8580665 (all editions).
1. Via Google Books (Radcliffe Science Library).
2. Via Google Books (Ohio State University).
- Wenderoth, Herrn Doktor Professor Georg Wilhelm Franz (1840). "Exogonium purga". In Bentham, George (ed.). Plantæ Hartwegianæ – Imprimis Mexicanas Adjectis Nonnullis Grahamianis Enumerat Novasque Describit [Hartweg's Plants – Primarily Mexican – With Some of Graham's Plants Added – Enumerations and Descriptions of New Species] (in Latin). p. 46. Retrieved July 2, 2024. OCLC 5722320 (all editions).
  Re:
1. Karl Theodor Hartweg (1812–1871)
2. Robert Graham (1786–1845)
  1. Via Internet Archive (Missouri Botanical Garden). 1839.
- Zuccarini, Joseph Gerhard (1797–1848) (1831). "Ipomoea Schiedeana Zuccar". Flora Oder Allgemeine Botanische Zeitung (in German). 14 (48). Regensburg Botanical Society: 801–816. ISSN 0367-1615; ISSN 0373-6490; OCLC 64210234 (all editions).
1. HathiTrust (Cornell University).
2. Internet Archive (Missouri Botanical Garden). 1818.
