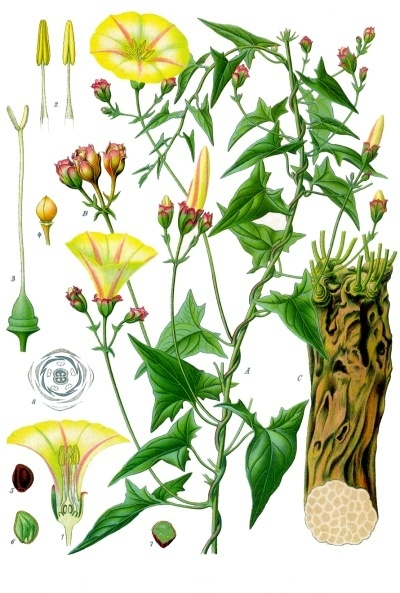

Scientific classification
- Kingdom: Plantae
- Clade: Tracheophytes
- Clade: Angiosperms
- Clade: Eudicots
- Clade: Asterids
- Order: Solanales
- Family: Convolvulaceae
- Genus: Convolvulus
- Species: C. scammonia

Binomial name
- Convolvulus scammonia L.

= Convolvulus scammonia =

Scammony

Species of bindweed

Convolvulus scammonia, commonly known as scammony, is a bindweed native to the countries of the eastern part of the Mediterranean basin; it grows in bushy waste places, from Syria in the south to Crimea in the north, its range extending westward to the Greek islands, but not to northern Africa or Italy. It is a twining perennial, bearing flowers like those of Convolvulus arvensis, and having irregularly arrow-shaped leaves and a thick fleshy root.

A cathartic resinous tincture known as scammoniae resina, which is obtained from the dried root by digestion with ethanol has been used as a traditional medicine. Upon consumption, the resin is inert until it has passed from the stomach into the duodenum, where it meets the bile. A chemical reaction occurs between it and taurocholate and glycocholate in the bile, whereby it is converted into a powerful purgative which in high doses becomes a violent gastrointestinal irritant. Scammony kills both roundworm and tapeworm, especially the former, and it was therefore used as an anthelmintic.

The principal bioactive component is the lipid glycoside scammonin (also known as jalapin, molecular formula C_{34}H_{56}O_{16}).
