= Jalap =

Obsolete cathartic drug

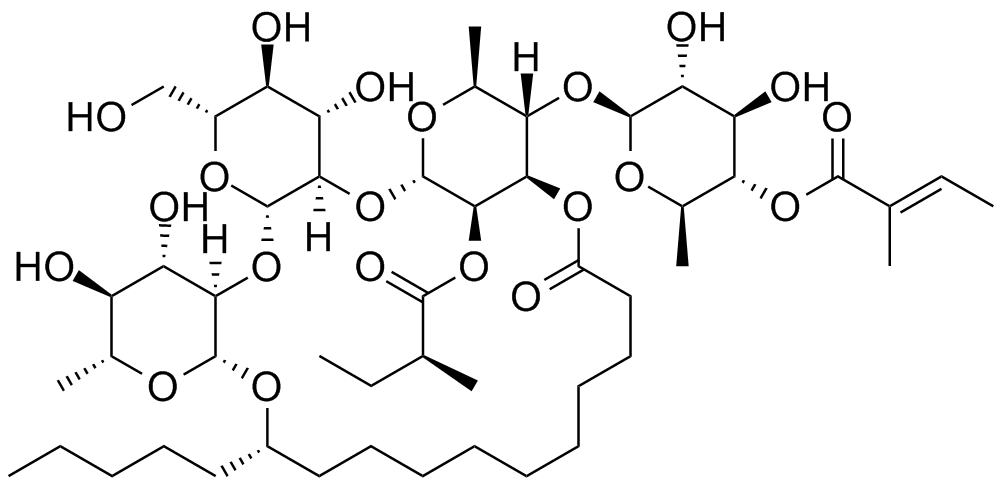
Chemical structure of scammonin I, one of the primary chemical constituents of jalap

Jalap is a cathartic drug, largely obsolete in Western medicine, consisting of the tuberous roots of Ipomoea purga, a convolvulaceous plant growing on the eastern declivities of the Sierra Madre Oriental of Mexico at an elevation of 5,000 to 8,000 feet (1,500 to 2,400 m) above sea level, more especially about the neighbourhood of Chiconquiaco on the eastern slope of the Cofre de Perote in the state of Veracruz.

Jalap has been known in Europe since the beginning of the 17th century, and derives its name from the city of Xalapa in Mexico, near which it grows, but its botanical source was not accurately determined until 1829, when Dr. J. R. Coxe of Philadelphia published a description.

The ordinary drug is distinguished in commerce as Vera Cruz jalap, from the name of the port whence it is shipped. Jalap has been cultivated for many years in India, chiefly at Ootacamund, and grows there as easily as a yam, often producing clusters of tubers weighing over 9 lb; but these, as they differ in appearance from the commercial article, have not as yet obtained a place in the English market. They are found, however, to be rich in resin, containing 18%. The plant also has been grown in Jamaica, at first amongst the cinchona trees, but more recently in new ground, as it was found to exhaust the soil. Besides Mexican or Vera Cruz jalap, a drug called Tampico jalap has been imported for some years in considerable quantity. It has a much more shrivelled appearance and paler colour than ordinary jalap, and lacks the small, transverse scars present in the true drug. This kind of jalap, the purga de Sierra Gorda of the Mexicans, was traced by Daniel Hanbury to Ipomoea simulans.

Ipomoea jalapa is yet another morning glory species from which jalap is obtained; it was first scientifically described (as Convolvulus jalapa) by Linnaeus. However, it is not of great commercial importance. As it also occurs in Veracruz, it was long confused with I. purga, even by such eminent botanists as David Don, Thomas Nuttall or C.J.W. Schiede. Consequently, the name I. jalapa is often seen as an invalid junior homonym referring to I. purga, in particular in sources older than 1989 (when the confusion was finally resolved). Throughout much of the 20th century, the I. jalapa of Linnaeus was called I. carrizalia.

== See also ==
- Ipomoea
