= Ayahuasca (Baiyu album) =

Studio album by Baiyu
- Released: December 1, 2013
- Recorded: 2013
- Genre: Contemporary R&B, pop, indie pop
- Length: 45:35
- Label: Shredded
- Producer: Grand Staff, Polo Crew, J.N.I.C.E., Baiyu (executive)

Ayahuasca is a full-length studio album by Chinese-American artist Baiyu released on December 1, 2013. This is the artist's second full-length project and is inspired by her psychedelic and soul exploratory experiences in the Amazon regions of Pucallpa, Peru. This is her first effort to not only take full rein on songwriting for the entire project, but also a first for producing the instrumentals for two of the fourteen tracks.

Baiyu's website explains, "Ayahuasca is my second full length, independently released project, and its creation has been a journey with many unforeseeable twists and turns. Each song peels away the delicate layers until you strip down to the core of who I am—who Baiyu really is.

Here is where I am most vulnerable yet strong, and here is where I am most afraid yet beautiful.

I couldn't make an album about something and not actually experience it for myself, so off I went. If trekking down to the jungles of Peru to work with this plant medicine sans companion wasn't enough of a daredevil move, what frightened me even more was the prospect of having to face my true self as a result. Thankfully what I saw was what I had always felt deep down—that although it took a lot of soul searching and there's infinite room for growth and learning—I, as I am today, am a proudly loving and passionate human being.

One thing that the Ayahuasca has taught me is that we are all capable of living out our wildest dreams if we just dare to surrender to the experience. I will carry that with me always.

Through this album, I hope to share with you my deepest secrets, and my purest of hopes and dreams. Love me for who I am or leave me for what could have been but either way, my story is open to you."

== Track listing ==
No.	Title	Writer(s)	Producer(s)	Length
1.	"Glory"	Baiyu	KQuick	4:19
2.	"Cold Hearted"	Baiyu	KQuick	3:28
3.	"Fire"	Baiyu	J.N.I.C.E.	3:07
4.	"Fearless"	Baiyu	Baiyu	1:08
5.	"Runaway"	Baiyu	KQuick	4:01
6.	"Sensory Overload"	Baiyu	KQuick	3:55
7.	"Paper"	Baiyu	KQuick	4:51
8.	"Ayahuasca"	Baiyu	KQuick	3:26
9.	"Sandman"	Baiyu	J.N.I.C.E.	4:33
10.	"Limitless"		Baiyu	0:53
11.	"Surrender"	Baiyu	KQuick	4:01
12.	"Surface"	Baiyu; Junious Sampson	Polo Crew	1:28
13.	"Speaking in Tongues"	Baiyu	KQuick	3:05
14.	"The One"	Baiyu	KQuick	3:20
Total length:				45:35

All credits adapted from the included digital booklet.
