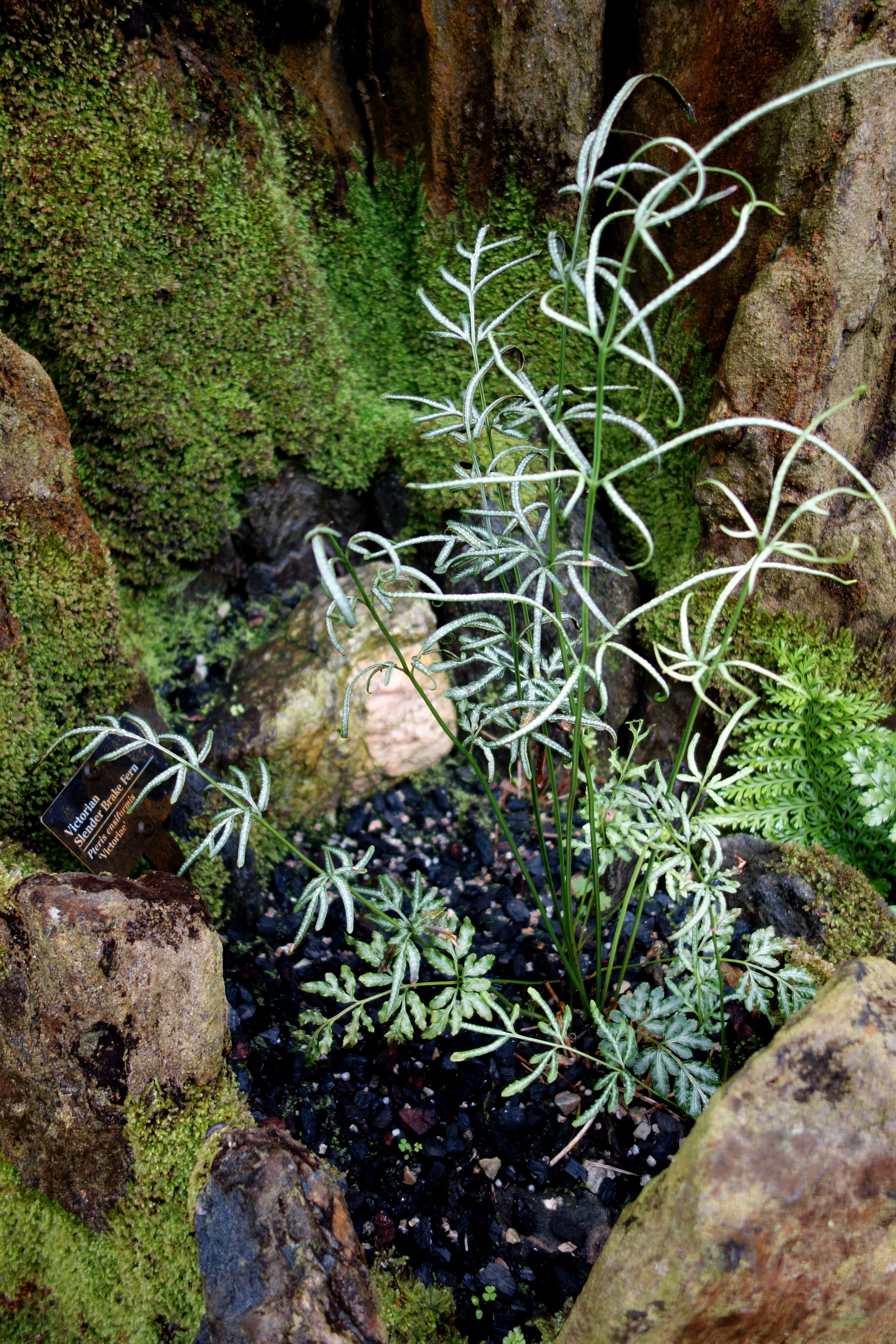
- Pteris ensiformis

Conservation status
- Secure (NatureServe)

Scientific classification
- Kingdom: Plantae
- Clade: Tracheophytes
- Division: Polypodiophyta
- Class: Polypodiopsida
- Order: Polypodiales
- Family: Pteridaceae
- Genus: Pteris
- Species: P. ensiformis

Binomial name
- Pteris ensiformis Burm. f, 1768

Varieties
- var. ensiformis; var. furcans Ching 1983; var. grevilleana Clarke ex Bedd. 1883; var. merrillii (C. Chr. ex Ching) S.H. Wu 1990; var. victoriae Baker 1890

= Pteris ensiformis =

Species of fern

Pteris ensiformis, the slender brake, silver lace fern, sword brake fern, or slender brake fern, is a plant species of the genus Pteris in the family Pteridaceae. It is found in Asia and the Pacific.

== Uses ==
=== Beverages ===
It is the most common ingredient of traditional herbal drinks in Taiwan containing different phenolic compounds : kaempferol 3-O-α-l-rhamnopyranoside-7-O-[α-d-apiofuranosyl-(1-2)-β-d-glucopyranoside], 7-O-caffeoylhydroxymaltol 3-O-β-d-glucopyranoside, hispidin 4-O-β-d-glucopyranoside, kaempferol 3-O-α-l-rhamnopyranoside-7-O-β-d-glucopyranoside, caffeic acid, 5-O-caffeoylquinic acid, 3,5-di-O-caffeoylquinic acid and 4,5-di-O-caffeoylquinic acid.

This plant is resistant to arsenic-induced oxidative stress.

Benzoyl-beta-D-glucoside, as well as pterosin sesquiterpenes can be found in P. ensiformis.

=== Cultivation ===
Pteris ensiformis is cultivated as an ornamental plant for tropical and subtropical climate gardens, and as a house plant.

Cultivars

- Pteris ensiformis 'Victoriae', the Victoria fern
- Pteris ensiformis 'Evergemiensis'

== See also ==
- List of plants with edible leaves
