= Bossip =

Online gossip magazine

- Website type: Gossip site
- Available in: English
- Website: bossip.com
- Launched: April 2006; 20 years ago
- Current status: Active

Bossip is an online gossip and entertainment magazine with a focus on African-American celebrities. The site is owned by iOne Digital, an Urban One company. The magazine is based in Atlanta, Georgia.

Bossip has interviewed celebrities such as Kanye West, Janet Jackson, Sanaa Lathan, Russell Simmons, Damon Dash and Kim Kardashian. The website is known for its humorous headlines.

== Awards ==
In October 2006, Bossip published its first annual Style Awards, with Diddy being given the title of best dressed African-American celebrity and Serena Williams as worst dressed.

Two months later, in December 2006, Bossip published a new "award" for most annoying celebrity of 2006 with singer and actress Beyoncé in first place, actor Taye Diggs at 10th position and rapper Kanye West given an honorable mention.
