= Hal Linton =

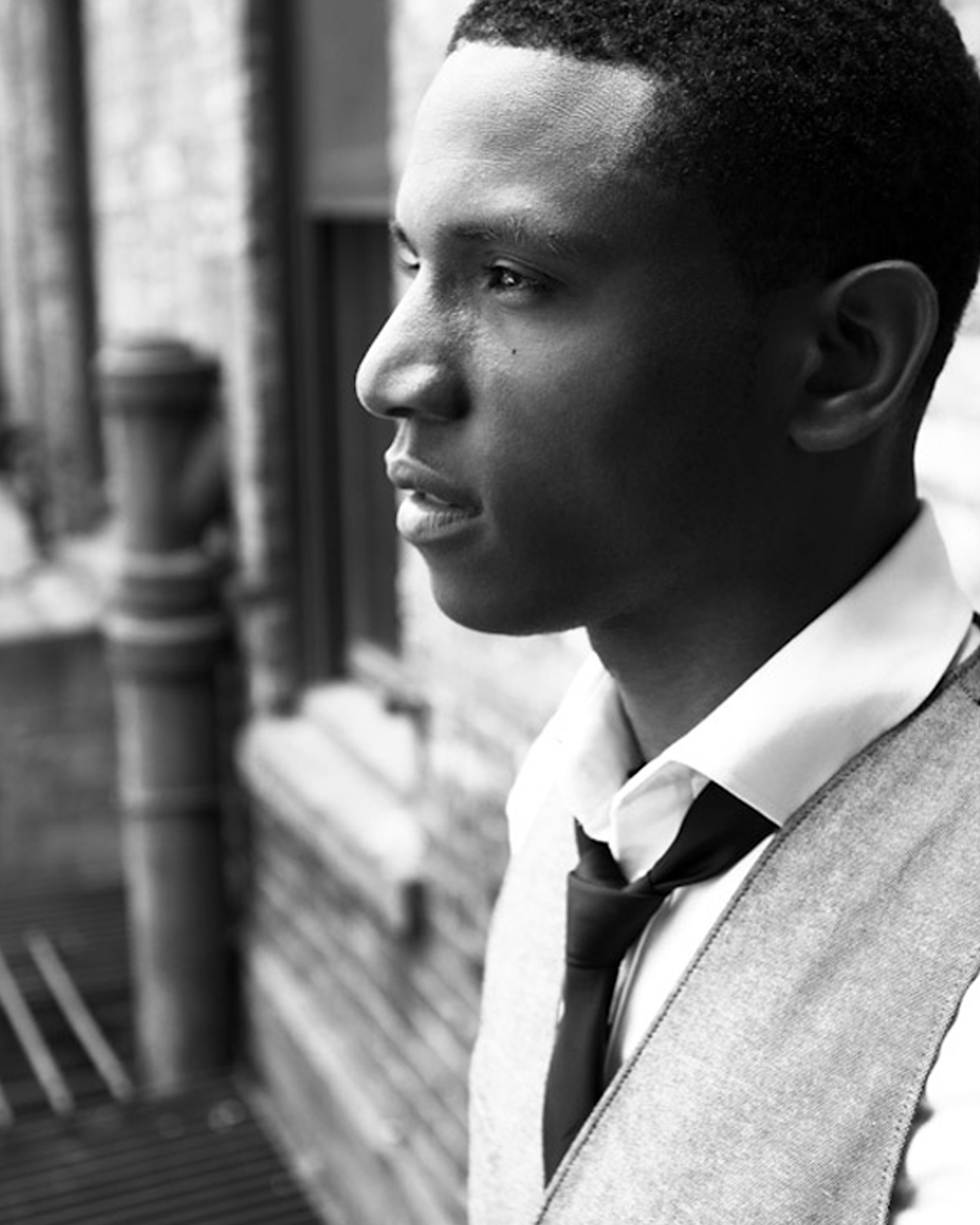
- Hal Linton Promo Image

Background information
- Born: Hal Alexander Linton; December 25, 1986 (age 39)
- Origin: Barbados
- Genres: R&B, pop, soul
- Occupations: Singer, songwriter, record producer
- Instruments: Vocals, piano, guitar
- Years active: 2006–present
- Labels: Funk Baby Productions, Green&Bloom, BMG

Hal Alexander Linton (born December 25, 1986) is a Barbadian born Soul/R&B singer, songwriter and producer. In October 2008 news broke in the small Caribbean island of Barbados that Hal Linton signed a million dollar deal with major record label Universal Motown, following in the footsteps of other Barbadian international recording artist Rihanna (Def Jam Recordings), Shontelle (Universal Motown), Livvi Franc (Jive Records) and Rupee (Atlantic).

== Biography ==
Linton is the only child of divorced parents Cheryl Linton and David Linton, two classically trained musicians. From as early as age 2, Linton hit the stage with his mother. He was raised as a Seventh-day Adventist, and his parents from early on instilled the moral and religious values of the Bible in him and his everyday life.

Linton's early schooling came at the Charles F. Broomes Memorial School and the Ellerslie Secondary School. He then went on to earn a Bachelor's degree in Design at Barbados Community College. Excelling in the field of Design, he was awarded a fully paid National Academic Scholarship in Barbados to gain his Masters at the Savannah School of Art & Design. However, Linton deferred the scholarship at the urging of his former music manager Teneille Doyle to pursue a career in music and entertainment.

== Career ==
In 2005, as part of the internship program for his BA in Design, Hal went to work at CRS Music Studio. It was there that his creativity excelled leading him into the production of his self produced independent album Spirit:Life:Love, released in 2006. The first single, "Cardiac Arrest", went on to characterize Linton to Barbados and the rest of the Caribbean region as the soul prince of the Caribbean. Likened to musical legends Marvin Gaye, Prince, and even D'Angelo, he was nominated for eight awards at the 2007 Barbados Music Awards where he won four: Best New Artist, Song of the Year, R&B Song of the Year, and Songwriter of the Year. Soon afterward he made his debut live performance at the Barbados Jazz Festival to rave reviews.

..he was inspired by his best friend Brandye Warner.Soul newcomer Hal Linton … really stole the show. At times, recalling the torched magic of Bilal or the burly heat of Omar, the fresh-faced Linton demonstrated the island's burgeoning R&B scene with infectious originals, such as the driving "Shake It Off" and his regional hit single, "Cardiac Arrest." But it was his ragamuffin makeover of Al Green's "Let's Stay Together" that sent the most chills down the enthusiastic audience's back. – John Murph (2007) BET

After hearing such rave reviews, the production company Syndicated Rhythm Entertainment (SRP Records), run by Carl Sturken and Evan Rogers and responsible for Rihanna, Shontelle, and The Urgency, put a deal on the table for the young artist in January 2007. Opting not to work with the production company at that time, Linton moved to the USA with his manager at the time, Teneille Doyle, who secured a spot on the Heineken Red Star Soul tour for him. Although they suffered many disappointments and setbacks, the duo persevered.

In September 2007, the Government of Barbados, through Invest Barbados, a division responsible for the export and development of culture, made a large financial commitment to the Linton project to assist in securing him a recording deal and promote his full export potential. This was the first time the Barbados Government had made such a commitment to any artist. It was through that funding that Linton showcased around the USA, worked with various producers, and met music business executives.

By May 2008, Linton and Doyle had three production deals on the table, including another offer from SRP Productions whom they later signed to. By July 2008, they had captured the interest of Universal Motown's President Sylvia Rhone, who signed him. While at Motown Linton released three singles: "She's Dangerous", "Southern Hospitality", and "Mind Control", which collectively earned him over a half a million YouTube views.

In 2009, Linton made his television debut as one of the featured artists on the BET show Grey Goose Rising Icons. The world of sports came calling next, when he was invited to perform at the 2009 NFL Thanksgiving Day Motown 50th Anniversary Tribute Halftime Show in Detroit. Linton truly had a passion for performing live, and toured extensively throughout the USA on such tickets as The Budweiser Super Fest, Essence Music Festival, Heineken Red Star Soul Tour, and Lexus Soul Stage. He also hit the road with acts including but not limited to John Legend, Estelle, Ryan Leslie, Fantasia, Solange, K.Michelle, and India Arie.

2011, Linton signed a major deal with the worldwide publishing conglomerate BMG, where he continues to work with contemporary award-winning producers, writers, and artists. These include Jerry Wonda, Salaam Remi, Wyclef Jean, Shontelle, Mary J. Blige, Melanie Fiona, Robin Thicke, Rico Love, Rockwilder, Dre & Vidal, Billy Mann Kwame, Stereotypes, Omen, D. Bunetta, Jim Jonsin, Chrisette Michele, Jessy Wilson, and Gourdan Banks, among others.
