= Ricki-Lee Coulter discography =

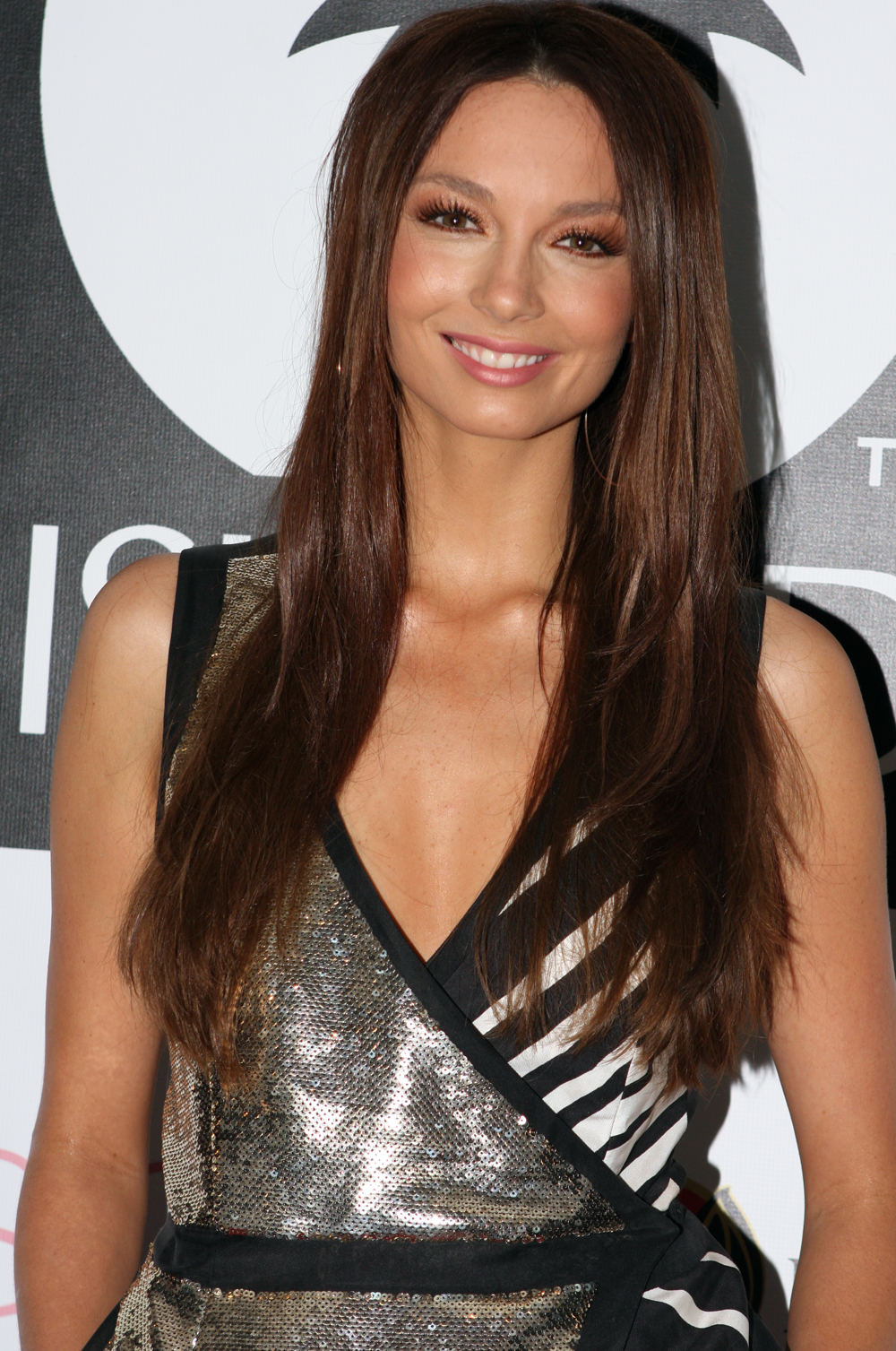
- Ricki-Lee Coulter at Blue Beat Club, Sydney in November 2012
- Studio albums: 5
- Compilation albums: 1
- Singles: 24
- Music videos: 20
- Album appearances: 4

Australian singer and songwriter Ricki-Lee Coulter has released five studio albums, one compilation album, twenty two singles, and twenty music videos. Coulter placed seventh in the second season of Australian Idol in 2004, and subsequently signed with independent label Shock Records. Coulter's self-titled debut album Ricki-Lee was released in October 2005, which debuted at number 30 on the ARIA Albums Chart. The album produced two top-ten singles, "Hell No!" and "Sunshine", which were both certified gold by the Australian Recording Industry Association (ARIA). Coulter briefly became a member of the Australian pop girl group Young Divas the following year, before resuming her solo career early in 2007.

Coulter's second studio album Brand New Day was released in August 2007, which peaked at number 37 and was certified gold. The album was preceded by the lead single "Can't Touch It", which peaked at number two on the ARIA Singles Chart and was certified platinum. It also produced two other top-ten singles, "Love Is All Around" and "Can't Sing a Different Song". Coulter's first compilation album Ricki-Lee: The Singles was released in November 2008, but failed to impact the charts. Its lead single "Wiggle It" peaked at number 11. Coulter was expected to release her third studio album Hear No, See No, Speak No in November 2009, but she decided to cancel the album's release due to its first two singles struggling on the charts. The album's lead single "Don't Miss You" peaked at number 24, while the second single "Hear No, See No, Speak No" peaked at number 46.

Coulter ended her contract with Shock Records in 2011 and signed with major label EMI Music Australia. Her third studio album Fear & Freedom was released in August 2012, which debuted at number seven and became Coulter's first top ten album. It included the top twenty singles "Raining Diamonds" and "Do It Like That", which were both certified platinum. The latter became Coulter's first song to chart in Japan, where it peaked at number seven on the Japan Hot 100 chart. Coulter's fourth studio album Dance in the Rain was released in October 2014, which debuted at number 14 and became her second top-fifteen album. The album included the singles "All We Need Is Love" and "Happy Ever After".

As of 2023, Ricki-Lee has sold over one million records globally. Her fifth studio album On My Own was released in March 2024.

== Albums ==
=== Studio albums ===
List of studio albums, with selected chart positions and certifications
Title	Album details	Peak chart positions		Certifications
Title	Album details	AUS	JPN	Certifications
Ricki-Lee	Released: 3 October 2005; Label: Shock; Formats: CD, digital download	30	—	
Brand New Day	Released: 11 August 2007; Label: Shock; Formats: CD, digital download	37	—	ARIA: Gold
Fear & Freedom	Released: 17 August 2012; Label: EMI Music Australia; Formats: CD, digital download	7	45	
Dance in the Rain	Released: 17 October 2014; Label: EMI Music Australia; Formats: CD, digital download	14	—	
On My Own	Released: 8 March 2024; Label: Black Label; Formats: CD, LP, digital download	3	—	
"—" denotes an album that did not chart or was not released in that territory.

=== Compilation albums ===
List of compilation albums, with selected details
Title	Album details
Ricki-Lee: The Singles	Released: 8 November 2008; Label: Shock Records; Formats: CD, digital download

== Singles ==
List of singles, with selected chart positions
Title	Year	Peak chart positions		Certifications	Album
Title	Year	AUS	JPN	Certifications	Album
"Hell No!"	2005	5	—	ARIA: Gold	Ricki-Lee
"Sunshine"	2005	8	—	ARIA: Gold	Ricki-Lee
"Breathe"	2006	14	—		Ricki-Lee
"Can't Touch It"	2007	2	—	ARIA: Platinum	Brand New Day
"Love Is All Around"	2007	5	—		Brand New Day
"Can't Sing a Different Song"	2008	8	—		Brand New Day
"Wiggle It"	2008	11	—		Ricki-Lee: The Singles
"Don’t Miss You"	2009	24	—		Hear No, See No, Speak No (unreleased)
"Hear No, See No, Speak No"	2009	46	—		Hear No, See No, Speak No (unreleased)
"Raining Diamonds"	2011	19	—	ARIA: Platinum	Fear & Freedom
"Do It Like That"	2012	13	7	ARIA: Platinum	Fear & Freedom
"Crazy"	2012	46	—		Fear & Freedom
"Burn It Down"	2012	49	—		Fear & Freedom
"Come & Get in Trouble with Me"	2013	28	—		Non-album single
"All We Need Is Love"	2014	39	—		Dance in the Rain
"Happy Ever After"	2014	65	—		Dance in the Rain
"Giddyup"	2014	—	—		Dance in the Rain
"Not Too Late"	2017	83	—		Non-album singles
"Unbothered"	2018	—	—		Non-album singles
"Last Night"	2020	— (Note: "Last Night" did not enter the ARIA Singles Chart, but peaked at number 3 on the Billboard Australian Digital Song Sales chart.)	—		Non-album singles
"On My Own"	2023	—	—		On My Own
"Point of No Return"	2023	—	—		On My Own
"Ghost"	2023	—	—		On My Own
"I Was Made for Loving You"	2024	—	—		On My Own
"—" denotes a single that did not chart or was not released in that territory.

== Other charted songs ==
List of non-single songs, with selected chart positions
Title	Year	Peak chart positions	Album
Title	Year	AUS	Album
"In the Mood"	2014	97	Dance in the Rain

== Album appearances ==
List of album appearances by Ricki-Lee Coulter
Title	Year	Album
"Proud Mary"	2004	Australian Idol 2: The Final 10 (Note: Coulter's contribution was recorded live on the second season of Australian Idol.)
"Have Yourself a Merry Little Christmas"	2008	The Spirit of Christmas 2008
"Can't Touch It"	2010	Sex and the City 2
"Get You Back" (Wally Lopez featuring Ricki-Lee)	2013	Follow Me!

== Music videos ==
List of music videos by Ricki-Lee Coulter
Title	Year	Director
"Hell No!"	2005	Bart Borghesi
"Sunshine"	2005	Bart Borghesi
"Breathe"	2006	Bart Borghesi
"Can't Touch It"	2007	Fin Edquist
"Love Is All Around"	2007	Fin Edquist
"Can't Sing a Different Song"	2008	Fin Edquist
"Wiggle It"	2008	Fin Edquist
"Don't Miss You"	2009	Peter Kirk
"Hear No, See No, Speak No"	2009	Casimir Dickson
"Raining Diamonds"	2011	Krozm (Chris Hill and Lachlan Dickie)
"Do It Like That"	2012	Emma Tomelty
"Crazy"	2012	Melvin J. Montalban
"Burn It Down"	2012	Prad Senanayake
"Come & Get in Trouble with Me"	2013	Ricki-Lee Coulter and Marc Furmie
"All We Need Is Love"	2014	Melvin J. Montalban
"Mirage"	2014	King Yong and David Boyce
"Not Too Late"	2017	Morgan Christie
"On My Own"	2023	Benn Jae
"Point of No Return"	2023	Arielle Thomas
"Ghost"	2023	James Chappell

== See also ==
- Young Divas discography
