= Fear & Freedom =

Studio album by Ricki-Lee Coulter
- Released: 17 August 2012
- Recorded: 2011–12
- Genres: Pop; dance-pop
- Length: 40:00
- Label: EMI Music Australia
- Producers: Eric J Dubowsky; Famties Productions; Thomas Honeywill; Scott Horscroft; Johnny Jam; Sammy Jay; KNS Productions; Brian London; Anthony Maniscalco; James O'Brien; Vince Pizzinga

Ricki-Lee Coulter chronology
Brand New Day (2007)	Fear & Freedom (2012)	Dance in the Rain (2014)

Singles from Fear & Freedom
- 1. "Raining Diamonds" Released: 18 October 2011; 2. "Do It Like That" Released: 23 March 2012; 3. "Crazy" Released: 13 July 2012; 4. "Burn It Down" Released: 7 December 2012

Fear & Freedom is the third studio album by Australian recording artist Ricki-Lee Coulter, released through EMI Music Australia on 17 August 2012. The album is Coulter's first release since parting ways with her former record label Shock Records. Coulter had been working on her third album since 2009, under the title Hear No, See No, Speak No, and was originally due for release in November 2009. However, Coulter cancelled the album's release due to unsuccessful singles. After taking a break from her music career in 2010, Coulter began working on new material for the album in 2011. Unlike her previous albums, Fear & Freedom incorporates up-tempo pop genres, ranging from dance-pop, electropop, drum and bass and trance. Love and self-empowerment are its main themes.

Upon its release, the album received positive reviews from music critics, who commended its production and Coulter's vocal performance. Fear & Freedom debuted at number seven on the ARIA Albums Chart, becoming the first top ten album of Coulter's solo career. The album was preceded by the lead single "Raining Diamonds", which peaked at number 19 on the ARIA Singles Chart and was certified platinum by the Australian Recording Industry Association. The second single "Do It Like That" peaked at number 13 and was also certified platinum. "Crazy" and "Burn It Down" were released as the third and fourth singles, respectively.

== Background and development ==
Coulter initially began work on her third studio album in 2009. Originally titled Hear No, See No, Speak No, Coulter spent three months in Los Angeles and New York recording 40 songs for the album. Hear No, See No, Speak No was originally scheduled for release in November 2009, but was later pushed back to January 2010. However, following the two unsuccessful singles "Don't Miss You" and the title track, Coulter told her record label Shock Records to cancel the album's release. She explained, "They [record label] got a lukewarm reaction to the singles they chose to put out, so it made sense not to release the album. I said I'd prefer the album not to go out than to go out and fail. It's my reputation on the line."

Coulter took a break from her music career in 2010 as she took on a full-time position as a breakfast radio presenter for Sydney's Nova 96.9, alongside Merrick Watts and Scott Dooley. After her contract with Nova ended, Coulter returned to the United States to work on new material for the album. Among those working with her were Billy Mann and Dave Shaw. She also spent time in Europe working on the album. In August 2011, it was revealed that Coulter had parted ways with Shock Records. Upon finding a new record deal, she sent copies of "Raining Diamonds" to several record labels. EMI Music Australia were impressed with the track and decided to sign her to their label. During an interview with Nine to Five in May 2012, Coulter spoke about the album, saying "I'm really excited for people to hear what I've been working on. This is a great pop album, it's full of singles, there's not one song on the album that doesn't have potential to be a single and I'm really proud of that." She also described it as "a very positive album".

"This is my best work because it has just come purely and completely from me. This is the most genuine and the most honest and the most free that I've ever felt writing and recording in the studio. I wasn't forced to work with anyone I didn't want to work with."

— Ricki-Lee Coulter, The Daily Telegraph.

On 25 May 2012, Coulter announced that the album would be called Fear & Freedom. The album cover was revealed on 13 July 2012, showing Coulter striking a pose as a futuristic warrior princess in front of a purple backdrop. She stated that the cover's theme is reflective of the album's message, saying "The album is about unleashing your inner strength, rising above all the thing that ever held you back and being free to do whatever you want to do in life. So the cover has that really epic, empowered and almost superhero-esque feeling about it and I'm so in love with it!."

== Composition ==
Unlike Coulter's previous albums, Fear & Freedom incorporates up-tempo pop genres, ranging from dance-pop, electropop, drum and bass, and trance. The album includes themes around love and self-empowerment. The opening track "Human" contains lyrics "about making mistakes and not being Superwoman". Ddegroodt of GloPop compared its melody to Agnes Carlsson's "Release Me" (2008), while Cameron Adams of the Herald Sun wrote that it recalls Katy Perry's "Firework" (2010). "Raining Diamonds" is a dance-pop song produced by Billy Mann. Coulter explained that the song is "about being empowered, about not standing for average, about not standing for people treating you bad, not standing for people taking advantage of you, getting out of shitty relationships and valuing yourself enough to say 'I deserve the best'". "Burn It Down" is an "uplifting" electropop song, described by Adams as "a radio-ready club banger bursting with Oprah-style self-empowerment".

"Do It Like That" was described as an "upbeat", "sexy" and "exciting" song, which has been compared by Andrew Tijs of Noise11 to Beyoncé. Ddegroodt wrote that the song revisits Coulter's 2007 single "Can't Touch It". "Crazy" is a drum and bass song, which contains lyrics about "letting the music take over your body and take control, losing your inhibitions and going crazy". Coulter described the song as "sensual and erotic". "On the Floor" contains lyrics about a "cheeky [...] ode of love making on the dance floor", while "I Feel Love" is about "a romantic happy ending". "World Disappears" is a trance song with dark themes. David Lim of Same Same described it as "a stroblit Ibiza-ready cut". Lim also described the final track "Bombshell" as "slow-burning", with lyrics that "reveal the sensual tones of a loved up, confident woman". Adams wrote that the song is similar to Zoë Badwi's "Freefallin" (2010). Nick Bond of the Star Observer noted that the CD bonus track "Left to Right" is a nod to Coulter's "R&B-pop roots".

== Release and promotion ==
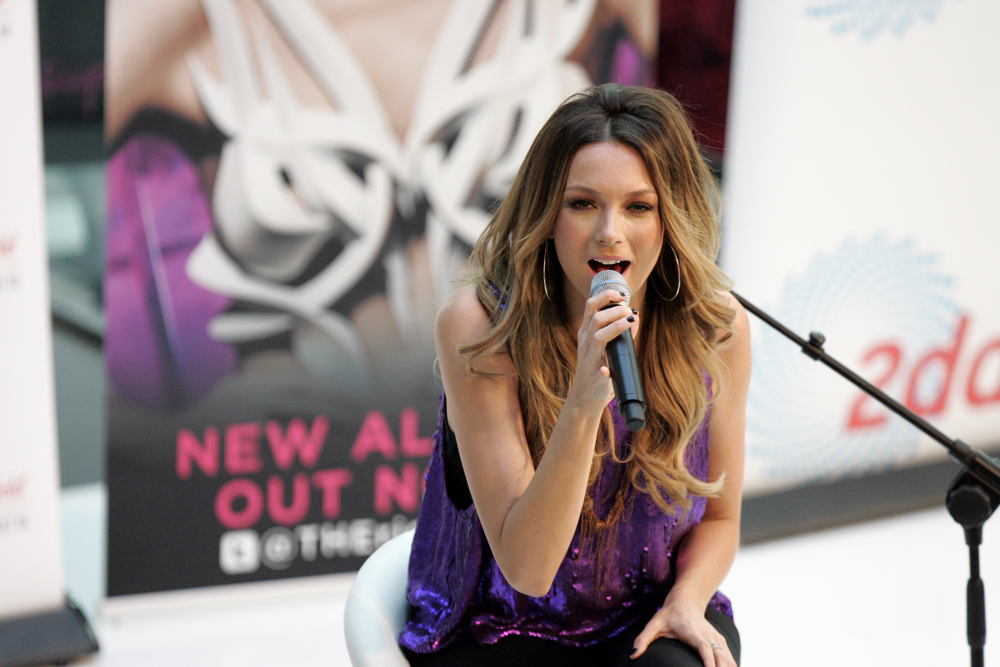
Coulter performing songs from Fear & Freedom at Westfield Parramatta in August 2012.

Fear & Freedom was released through EMI Music Australia on 17 August 2012, as both digital download and CD formats. Coulter appeared on the breakfast television program Sunrise on 25 May 2012 to perform "Do It Like That" and "Burn It Down". She held a one-off show at the Beresford Hotel, Sydney on 30 May 2012, where she performed songs from the album. Snippets of unreleased songs from Fear & Freedom were uploaded to Coulter's official YouTube account on 2 August 2012. Coulter promoted the album through live televised performances of "Crazy" on Australia's Funniest Home Videos on 18 August 2012, and Sunrise on 20 August 2012. Later that month, she toured Westfield shopping centres in Chermside, Miranda, Parramatta, Southland, Whitford City and Carousel, performing songs from Fear & Freedom and signing CD copies of the album for fans.

=== Singles ===
"Raining Diamonds" was released as the album's lead single on 18 October 2011. It peaked at number 19 on the ARIA Singles Chart and was certified platinum by the Australian Recording Industry Association for selling over 70,000 copies. "Do It Like That" was released as the second single on 23 March 2012. The song peaked at number 13 on the ARIA Singles Chart and was also certified platinum. It also peaked at number seven on the Japan Hot 100 chart. The third single "Crazy" was released on 13 July 2012, which peaked at number 46. The fourth and final single "Burn It Down" was released on 7 December 2012, and peaked at number 49.

=== Tour ===
In September 2012, Coulter embarked on her Fear & Freedom Tour in Sydney, Melbourne and Brisbane. A fourth show was added to the tour for January 2013.

Date	Location	Venue
5 September 2012	Melbourne	Billboard The Venue
6 September 2012	Darlinghurst, Sydney	Oxford Art Factory
9 September 2012	Fortitude Valley, Brisbane	The Family Fluffy
11 January 2013	Melbourne	The Palms at Crown

== Reception ==
=== Critical response ===
Professional ratings
Review scores
Source	Rating
The Border Mail	3.5 stars
Herald Sun	3.5 stars
NW	3.5 stars

Fear & Freedom received positive reviews from music critics. Cameron Adams of the Herald Sun awarded the album three and a half stars, and wrote that "This sounds like a pop album should in 2012". Adams also highlighted "Raining Diamonds" as the "best moment" on Fear & Freedom and summarized the album in one word: "emancipated". Ddegroodt of GloPop praised Coulter for releasing "a faultless, refreshing new pop album which should earn her without a doubt the title of Australia's Pop Queen". She viewed "World Disappears" as the standout track on Fear & Freedom and suggested that the song has the potential to be a "global hit". Same Same's David Lim labeled the album as Coulter's "best and strongest body of work to date", and described it as "vibrant, triumphant and genuine". A writer for Take 40 Australia called Fear & Freedom Coulter's "most dance-friendly release so far".

Nick Bond of the Star Observer wrote that the album "stands head and shoulders above her previous efforts", and that each track has the potential to be a single. A writer for The Hot Hits noted that there are several tracks on Fear & Freedom that highlight Coulter's "vocal skills", and praised "the party starting tracks that will make you want to hit the dance floor". A writer for the Australian Recording Industry Association called it a "dance-heavy album", and wrote "if you need an album that's a poppy-party-starter this might just be what you're after!". A reviewer for NW magazine commented, "If you ever doubted it [Fear & Freedom], we'll tell you straight [...] Ricki-Lee is the real deal". Ara Jensen of The West Australian wrote that the album features "some of the most self-assured and thumping vocal performances" of Coulter's career. However, Jensen felt that some of the tracks were "a little uncomfortable" to listen to. Jamie Horne of The Border Mail described Fear & Freedom as "anthemic" and noted it as a "positive pop, mature pop" type of album.

=== Commercial performance ===
Fear & Freedom debuted at number seven on the ARIA Albums Chart on 27 August 2012, becoming Coulter's first top ten album on that chart as a solo artist. She previously had a top ten album as a member of the Australian girl group Young Divas for their self-titled debut album (2006). Fear & Freedom also debuted at number one on the ARIA Dance Albums Chart. In its second week, the album dropped eighteen spots to number 25 on the ARIA Albums Chart and left the top fifty in its third week.

== Track listing ==
No.	Title	Writer(s)	Producer(s)	Length
1.	"Human"	Ricki-Lee Coulter; Keely Hawkes; James O'Brien	O'Brien; Eric J Dubowsky^{[b]}	3:06
2.	"Raining Diamonds"	Billy Mann; Boyblue; Coulter	Boyblue	3:04
3.	"Burn It Down"	Coulter; S.J. Powell	Anthony Maniscalco; Sammy Jay^{[c]}	3:55
4.	"Do It Like That"	Coulter; Brian Kierulf; Josh Schwartz	KNS Productions; Scott Horscroft^{[a]}; Dubowsky^{[a]}	2:47
5.	"Crazy"	Coulter; Brian London	Johnny Jam; London; Thomas Honeywill^{[a]}	3:26
6.	"On the Floor"	Coulter; Vince Pizzinga; Kate Akhurst	Pizzinga	3:36
7.	"I Feel Love"	Coulter; Pizzinga; Akhurst	Pizzinga; Famties Productions	4:00
8.	"Never Let Go"	Coulter; Kierulf; Schwartz	KNS Productions; Dubowsky^{[a]}	3:48
9.	"World Disappears"	Coulter; Hawkes	Maniscalco; O'Brien	3:48
10.	"Bombshell"	Coulter; Powell	Jay	4:36

Digital bonus track
No.	Title	Writer(s)	Length
11.	"Because I Can"	Coulter; Reed Vertelney; Lindy Robbins	3:55
Total length:			40:01

CD bonus track
No.	Title	Writer(s)	Producer(s)	Length
11.	"Left to Right^{[d]}"	Coulter; Kierulf; Schwartz	KNS Productions	3:54
Total length:				40:00

Japanese bonus track
No.	Title	Writer(s)	Length
12.	"Look at Me Now"	John-Mark Baxter Seltzer	3:40
Total length:			43:40

Japanese iTunes Store deluxe edition bonus tracks
No.	Title	Writer(s)	Length
13.	"Because I Can"	Coulter; Reed Vertelney; Lindy Robbins	3:55
14.	"Do It Like That" (music video)		2:48
15.	"Raining Diamonds" (music video)		3:05
16.	"Crazy" (music video)		3:34
Total length:			57:02

Notes

- ^{^a} signifies an additional producer
- ^{^b} signifies a vocal producer
- ^{^c} signifies a co-producer
- ^{^d} "Left to Right" is placed as track 5 prior to "Crazy" on the Japanese physical editions of the album. The rest of the tracks follow subsequently with no further adjustments.

== Credits and personnel ==
Adapted from the liner notes of Fear & Freedom.

Locations

- Mixed at Super Sonic Scale, and Ninja Beat Club in Atlanta, Georgia.
- Mastered at Studios 301 in Sydney.

Creative credits

- debaser.com.au – artwork
- Cybele Malinowski – photography

Technical credits

- Kate Akhurst – songwriter
- Boyblue – songwriter, producer, engineering
- Ricki-Lee Coulter – lead vocals, songwriter
- Eric J Dubowsky – vocal producer, additional producer, co-producer
- Famties Productions (Jesse Rogg and Rob Rox) – producers
- Bruno Ferraro – mastering
- Veronica Ferraro – mixing
- Keely Hawkes – songwriter
- Thomas Honeywill – additional producer
- Scott Horscroft – additional producer
- Johnny Jam – producer
- Brian Kierulf (KNS Productions) – songwriter, producer
- Brian London – songwriter, producer
- Anthony Maniscalco – producer
- Billy Mann – songwriter
- James O'Brien – songwriter, producer
- Vince Pizzinga – songwriter, producer
- S.J. Powell (Sammy Jay) – songwriter, producer, co-producer
- Daniela Rivera – additional assistant engineering
- Josh Schwartz (KNS Productions) – songwriter, producer
- Sameer Sengupta – mastering
- Phil Tan – mixing

== Charts ==
=== Weekly charts ===
Chart (2012–13)	Peak position
ARIA Albums Chart	7
ARIA Dance Albums Chart	1
Japan Albums Chart	45

=== Year-end charts ===
Chart (2012)	Rank
ARIA Dance Albums Chart	30

== Release history ==
Country	Date	Format(s)	Edition(s)	Label
Australia	17 August 2012	CD; digital download	Standard	EMI Music Australia
New Zealand	17 August 2012	Digital download	Standard	EMI Music Australia
Japan	30 January 2013	CD; digital download	Standard; deluxe	EMI Music Japan
