= On My Own =

On My Own may refer to:

== Albums ==
- On My Own (Brandon Paris Band album) or the title song, 2006
- On My Own (Magic album), 2003
- On My Own (Queensberry album) or the title song, 2009
- On My Own (Ricki-Lee album) or the title song, 2024
- On My Own (Tatiana Okupnik album) or the title song, 2007
- On My Own, by Crunchy Black, 2006
- On My Own, by Jonalyn Viray, 2005
- On My Own, by Trans-X, 1988

== Songs ==
- "On My Own" (Bishara song), at Melodifestivalen 2019
- "On My Own" (Consequence and Kid Cudi song), 2011
- "On My Own" (Haldor Lægreid song), representing Norway at Eurovision 2001
- "On My Own" (Hedley song), 2005
- "On My Own" (Les Misérables song), from the musical Les Misérables, 1980
- "On My Own" (Patti LaBelle and Michael McDonald song), 1986; covered by Reba McEntire, 1995
- "On My Own" (Peach Union song), 1996
- "On My Own (Ricki-Lee Coulter song), 2023
- "On My Own" (Yasmin song), 2011
- "On My Own", by Ashes Remain from What I've Become, 2011
- "On My Own", by Beddy Rays, 2021
- "On My Own", by Black Eyed Peas from Bridging the Gap, 2000
- "On My Own", by Claire Richards from My Wildest Dreams, 2019
- "On My Own", by Farrah Abraham from My Teenage Dream Ended, 2012
- "On My Own", by From Ashes to New from The Future, 2018
- "On My Own", by Hank Williams III from Risin' Outlaw, 1999
- "On My Own", by Jaden from Erys, 2019
- "On My Own", by Marina Kaye, 2017
- "On My Own", by Miley Cyrus from Bangerz, 2013
- "On My Own", by Mumzy Stranger, 2008
- "On My Own", by Niall Horan from Flicker, 2017
- "On My Own", by Tee Grizzley from Activated, 2018
- "On My Own", by Three Days Grace from One-X, 2006
- "On My Own", by Trevor Daniel from Homesick, 2018
- "On My Own", by the Used from The Used, 2002
- "Try It on My Own", by Whitney Houston, titled "On My Own" on certain releases, 2003

== Other uses ==
- On My Own (film), a 1991 film starring Judy Davis and Matthew Ferguson
- On My Own (memoir), a 1958 memoir by Eleanor Roosevelt
- On My Own, a novel by Melody Carlson

== See also ==
- On Our Own (disambiguation)
- On Your Own (disambiguation)
