= Do It Like That =

Do It Like That may refer to:

- Do It Like That (Ricki-Lee Coulter song), 2012
- Do It Like That (Tomorrow X Together and Jonas Brothers song), 2023
