= Morgan Christie =

Australian film director

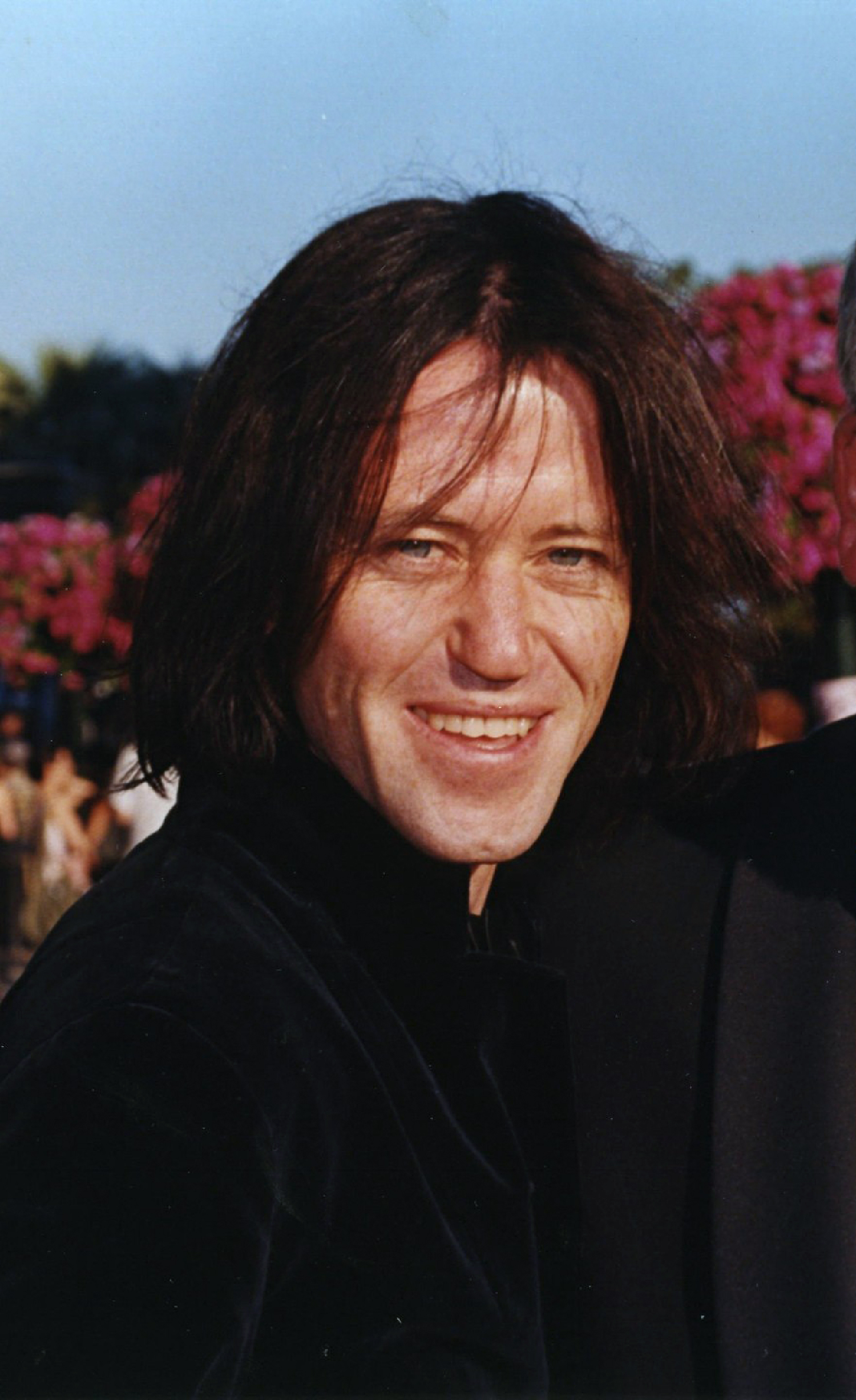
Morgan Christie attends the world premiere of Synecdoche, New York at the Cannes Film Festival, May 23 2008.

Morgan Christie is an Australian film director and music video director, film editor and producer. He is a graduate of the Australian Film Television and Radio School with specialization in Cinematography and Digital Media and alumni of the Berlinale Talent Campus.

== Career ==
Christie has directed music videos for artists on major and independent labels in Australia which have received two Australian Directors Guild award nominations for "Nothing Lasts Forever" by The Living End and "Miracle Cure" by Something For Kate. He was also nominated by the Australian Screen Editors guild in the category of Best Editing in a Music Video.

He began his career as a commercials director as a recipient of the Next Big Thing Award from Getty Images and has since directed award-winning campaigns for major international brands including General Mills Yoplait, a Silver Unilever award for his PanAsian OMO campaign was also awarded at the Cannes Lions Advertising Awards for his commercial work for Swiss electronics brand, Logitech in 2010

He is credited as the development producer of the Nine Network series Underbelly Razor, the fourth season based on the violent razor gangs of East Sydney in the early 1920s led by notorious crime bosses, Kate Leigh and Tilly Devine. The TV series was based on the book, "Razor" by Larry Writer (PanMacMillan) whose underlying rights are owned by Silverspell Pty Ltd.

== Filmography ==
=== Music videos ===
Year	Artist	Song	Label
2000	The Hunting Party	"Groovin"	Sony Music Entertainment
2000	Midnight Oil	"The Real Thing"	Sony Music Entertainment
2000	Endorphin	"Blue Moon"	Sony Music Entertainment
2001	Lo-Tel	"Teenager of the Year"	Sony BMG/Murmur
2001	B(if)tek	"We Think You're Dishy"	Sony BMG/Murmur
2001	Something For Kate	"The Astronaut"	Sony BMG/Murmur
2002	Endorphin	"Afterwords"	Sony BMG/Murmur
2002	Something For Kate	"Say Something"	Sony BMG/Murmur
2006	The Living End	"Nothing Lasts Forever"	Capitol Records
2013	Something For Kate	"Miracle Cure"	EMI Music Australia
2017	Ricki-Lee Coulter	"Not Too Late"	Universal Music Australia
2019	Odette	"Take it to the Heart"	Universal Music Australia
2021	Something For Kate	"Situation Room"	EMI Music Australia

=== Short films ===
Year	Title	Gauge	Cast
2006	The Libertine	35mm color	Arthur Dignam, Wendy Strehlow
