= Crazy (Ricki-Lee song) =

Single by Ricki-Lee Coulter

from the album Fear & Freedom
- Released: 13 July 2012
- Genre: Pop
- Length: 3:26
- Label: EMI
- Songwriters: Ricki-Lee Coulter; Brian London
- Producers: Johnny Jam; Brian London; Thomas Honeywill

Ricki-Lee Coulter singles chronology
"Do It Like That" (2012)	"Crazy" (2012)	"Burn It Down" (2012)

Music video
- "Crazy" on YouTube

"Crazy" is a song by Australian recording artist Ricki-Lee Coulter, taken from her third studio album Fear & Freedom (2012). It was written by Coulter and Brian London, who also produced the song with Johnny Jam and Thomas Honeywill. The song was released digitally on 13 July 2012, as the third single from the album.

Lyrically, Coulter stated that "Crazy" is about "encouraging you [to] let go of your inhibitions, go crazy and let the music take over". Following its release, "Crazy" peaked at number four on the ARIA Dance Chart and number 46 on the ARIA Singles Chart. The accompanying music video was directed by Melvin J. Montalban and filmed in the Callan Park Hospital for the Insane in Sydney. The video features Coulter playing three characters – a nurse, patient and psychologist.

== Background and release ==
"Crazy" was written by Ricki-Lee Coulter and Brian London, who also produced the song with Johnny Jam and Thomas Honeywill. It was mixed by Veronica Ferraro at Super Sonic Scale, and mastered by Sameer Sengupta at Studios 301 in Sydney. During an interview with The Daily Telegraph, Coulter said she wrote the song "as if I was actually singing it directly to the people on the dance floor". She went on to describe it as "sensual and erotic, encouraging you let go of your inhibitions, go crazy and let the music take over". "Crazy" was released digitally on 13 July 2012. On 23 July 2012, it debuted at number 52 on the ARIA Singles Chart and number four on the ARIA Dance Chart. The following week, "Crazy" fell out of the top 100 of the ARIA Singles Chart. On 6 August 2012, the song re-entered the chart at number 46, where it peaked.

== Music video ==
The accompanying music video for "Crazy" was directed by Melvin J. Montalban and inspired by the film Terminator 2: Judgment Day and in particular the character of Sarah Connor. The video was filmed in the Callan Park Hospital for the Insane in Sydney, and premiered on Vevo on 25 July 2012. Coulter explained the video's concept in a behind-the-scenes video, saying: "The song 'Crazy' is all about just letting the music take over your body and take control, losing your inhibitions and going crazy and I thought why not do a play on the word crazy and do it in an asylum and act out a bit crazy. I'm actually every character, so I'm the patient but I'm also the nurse and I'm also the psychologist that's evaluating me, so it's like I'm trapped within my own head."

== Track listing ==
- Digital download
1. "Crazy" – 3:26
- Digital Remixes EP
1. "Crazy" – 3:26
2. "Crazy" (Instrumental) – 3:39
3. "Crazy" (Bombs Away Remix) – 6:25
4. "Crazy" (Doctor Werewolf Remix) – 4:53

== Credits and personnel ==
Credits adapted from the liner notes of Fear & Freedom.

Locations

- Mixed at Super Sonic Scale.
- Mastered at Studios 301 in Sydney.

Personnel

- Songwriting – Ricki-Lee Coulter, Brian London
- Original production – Johnny Jam, Brian London
- Additional production – Thomas Honeywill
- Mixing – Veronica Ferraro
- Mastering – Sameer Sengupta

== Charts ==
=== Weekly charts ===
Chart (2012)	Peak position
Australia (ARIA)	46
Australia Dance (ARIA)	4

=== Year-end charts ===
Chart (2012)	Rank
ARIA Dance Singles Chart	45

== Release history ==
Country	Date	Format	Label
Australia	13 July 2012	Digital download	EMI Music Australia
Australia	10 August 2012	Digital remix EP	EMI Music Australia
