= Wiggle It (Ricki-Lee song) =

Single by Ricki-Lee Coulter

from the album Ricki-Lee: The Singles
- Released: 13 September 2008
- Recorded: 2007
- Genre: R&B; dance-pop
- Length: 2:57
- Label: Shock
- Songwriters: Ricki-Lee Coulter; Israel Cruz
- Producers: Israel; Ricki-Lee Coulter

Ricki-Lee Coulter singles chronology
"Can't Sing a Different Song" (2008)	"Wiggle It" (2008)	"Don't Miss You" (2009)

"Wiggle It" is a song performed by Australian singer-songwriter, Ricki-Lee Coulter. It was co-written and co-produced by Coulter and Israel Cruz. The song features additional rap vocals by Samir. Released both physically and digitally on 13 September 2008 "Wiggle It" serves as the lead single from Coulter's compilation album, Ricki-Lee: The Singles.

== Background ==
Coulter co-wrote "Wiggle It" with Israel Cruz in 2006. She explained, "I was disappointed when "Wiggle It" didn't work on my last album, so I'm beyond THRILLED to be finally getting this single out to my fans." The song features a chorus sample from the 1990 hit "Wiggle It" by American hip hop duo, 2 in a Room. It was serviced to Australian radio stations on 4 August 2008.

== Music video ==
The music video for "Wiggle It" was directed by Fin Edquist and shot at the Valve Nightclub in Melbourne. It is a parody of the typical club video, with Coulter looking for someone to spend her night with and coming up only with a number of characters who are all wrong for her. The video features a cameo appearance by 2006 Big Brother contestant David Graham who is seen wearing skin-tight gold pants. It premiered on Video Hits on 30 August 2008.

== Track listing ==
CD single / digital download

1. "Wiggle It" (Radio edit) – 2:56
2. "Wiggle It" (Karaoke mix) – 2:40
3. "Wiggle It" (Acapella) – 5:43
4. "Wiggle It" (Instrumental) – 2:54
5. "U Wanna Little of This" (UK Radio Edit) – 2:45
6. "Wiggle It" (Cabin Crew Remix) – 6:21

== Credits and personnel ==
Credits adapted from the liner notes of Ricki-Lee: The Singles.

Locations

- Engineered in Sydney.

Personnel

- Songwriting – Ricki-Lee Coulter, Israel Cruz
- Production – Israel, Ricki-Lee Coulter
- Engineering – Israel Cruz
- Additional rap vocals – Samir

== Charts ==
"Wiggle It" debuted and peaked at number 11 on the ARIA Singles Chart. It ranked at number 36 on the ARIA End of Year top 50 Australian artists singles of 2008.

=== Weekly charts ===
Chart (2008)	Peak position
ARIA Singles Chart	11

=== Year-end charts ===
Chart (2008)	Rank
Australian Artists Singles (ARIA)	36

== Release history ==
Country	Date	Format	Label
Australia	13 September 2008	CD, digital download	Shock records
