= On Our Own =

On Our Own may refer to:

== Television and film ==
- On Our Own (1977 TV series), an American sitcom starring Bess Armstrong and Lynnie Greene
- On Our Own (1994 TV series), an American sitcom starring Ralph Louis Harris
- On Our Own (film), a 1988 American film starring Sam Hennings

== Music ==
- "On Our Own" (Bobby Brown song), 1989
- "On Our Own" (Lime Cordiale song), 2020

== See also ==
- On My Own (disambiguation)
- On Your Own (disambiguation)
