= Burn It Down (Ricki-Lee song) =

Single by Ricki-Lee Coulter

from the album Fear & Freedom
- Released: 7 December 2012
- Genre: Dance-pop
- Length: 3:55
- Label: EMI
- Songwriters: Ricki-Lee Coulter; Samantha Powell
- Producers: Anthony Maniscalco; Sammy Jay

Ricki-Lee Coulter singles chronology
"Crazy" (2012)	"Burn It Down" (2012)	"Come & Get in Trouble with Me" (2013)

Music video
- "Burn It Down" on YouTube

"Burn It Down" is a song recorded by Australian singer Ricki-Lee Coulter. It was written by Coulter and Samantha Powell, who produced "Burn It Down" with Anthony Maniscalco. The song was released physically and digitally on 7 December 2012, as the fourth and final single from Coulter's third studio album Fear & Freedom (2012). "Burn It Down" is a dance-pop song with lyrics that deliver messages of self-empowerment. The song received positive reviews from music critics, who praised its production and lyrics. "Burn It Down" reached number 49 on the ARIA Singles Chart and number 13 on the ARIA Dance Singles Chart. An accompanying music video was directed by Prad Senanayake and filmed in Gold Coast, Queensland.

== Background and release ==
"Burn It Down" was written by Ricki-Lee Coulter and Samantha Powell, who produced the song under her production name Sammy Jay with Anthony Maniscalco. Coulter debuted the song on Australian breakfast television program, Sunrise, on 25 May 2012. In an interview with Cream magazine, Coulter described "Burn It Down" as "uplifting and motivating". She went on to say that the song is "about rising above anything that's ever held you down or held you back before. It's that declaration of saying, 'I'm better than this, I can do what I want, and nothing is gonna stop me'. It's one of those stomping anthems that people can turn to when they need a little inspiration and motivation". The single cover was revealed on 5 October 2012, showing Coulter striking a pose in front of a sky blue backdrop, wearing a yellow sequin dress. "Burn It Down" was released physically and digitally 7 December 2012, as the fourth and final single from Coulter's third studio album Fear & Freedom.

== Reception ==
Cameron Adams of News Limited described "Burn It Down" as "a radio-ready club banger bursting with Oprah-style self-empowerment". Nick Bond of the Star Observer noted it as a highlight from the album and wrote that it has "the so-hot-right-now sounds of club-ready dance-pop with the most honest and personal lyrics of her career". Beat magazine called "Burn It Down" a "Calvin Harris-style banger" and noted that Coulter "overstretches it in the verses, but hits the mark pretty well when the chorus drops". The Music Network viewed it as a "summer tune". On 17 December 2012, "Burn It Down" entered the ARIA Singles Chart at number 83 and the ARIA Dance Singles Chart at number 19. The following week, it ascended to number 68 on the ARIA Singles Chart and to number 16 on the ARIA Dance Singles Chart. On 14 January 2013, the song peaked at number 13 on the ARIA Dance Singles Chart and number 49 on the ARIA Singles Chart.

Coulter performed "Burn It Down" live for the first time on Sunrise on 25 May 2012. In April–May 2014, Coulter was the supporting act for Jason Derulo's Australian leg of his Tattoos World Tour, where she performed the song as part of her set list.

=== Music video ===
The music video was directed by Prad Senanayake and filmed in Gold Coast, Queensland on 7–8 October 2012. On 29 September 2012, marketing website StarNow announced that volunteer extras were needed for the beach party and diner scenes of the music video. The diner scenes were shot at a place called Ferry Road Diner, which Coulter used to visit as a child. She said, "I used to come here 20 years ago when I was a little kid ... and eat chicken and chips every Sunday night ... my family, we'll come down, this is where we'd hang out." A preview of the video was posted on her Facebook page on 5 November 2012. The official video clip premiered on Vevo on 12 November 2012.

The video begins with Coulter working as an unhappy waitress in a diner. Fed up of being treated like dirt by the customers, Coulter quits her job, steals a customer's car, and flips the bird to her bosses. While driving Coulter picks up a male hitchhiker and they spend the night together at a motel. The next morning she drives on her own to meet up with friends for a bonfire-lit beach party that includes drinking and dancing. After a big night Coulter wakes up in the outback, near a waterfall, and then jumps into the water. The final scene shows Coulter taking off her top with her back facing the camera. Take 40 Australia described the clip as "pretty saucy" and wrote that it is "A little bit more adventurous than a lot of squeaky clean pop stars, that's for sure!". The Music Network called it a "breezy" video.

== Track listing ==
- Digital download
1. "Burn It Down" – 3:55
2. "Burn It Down" (Club Mix) – 6:17
3. "Raining Diamonds" (MTV Local Produce) – 5:32
- CD
1. "Burn It Down" – 3:55
2. "Burn It Down" (Club Mix) – 6:17
3. "Raining Diamonds" (MTV Local Produce) – 5:32
4. "The Scientist" (Acoustic Live)

== Credits and personnel ==
Credits adapted from the liner notes of Fear & Freedom.

Locations

- Mixed at Super Sonic Scale.
- Mastered at Studios 301 in Sydney.

Personnel

- Songwriting – Ricki-Lee Coulter, Samantha Powell
- Production – Anthony Maniscalco
- Co-production – Sammy Jay
- Mixing – Veronica Ferraro
- Mastering – Sameer Sengupta

== Charts ==
Chart (2012–13)	Peak position
Australia (ARIA)	49
Australia Dance (ARIA)	13

== Release history ==
Country	Date	Format	Label
Australia	7 December 2012	CD; digital download	EMI Music Australia
