= Breathe (Ricki-Lee song) =

2006 single by Ricki-Lee Coulter

Single by Ricki-Lee Coulter

from the album Ricki-Lee
- Released: 9 January 2006
- Length: 3:32
- Label: Shock
- Songwriters: Russ Ballard; Christian Ballard; Sara Eker; Lucy Abbott; Dawn Joseph; Andrew Murray
- Producer: Audius

Ricki-Lee Coulter singles chronology
"Sunshine" (2005)	"Breathe" (2006)	"Can't Touch It" (2007)

"Breathe" is a song by Australian singer Ricki-Lee Coulter from her self-titled debut album, Ricki-Lee (2005). It was released both physically and digitally on 9 January 2006 as the third and final single from the album. "Breathe" peaked at number 14 on the ARIA Singles Chart. The music video was directed by Bart Borghesi and filmed in Port Melbourne, Victoria.

== Background and release ==
"Breathe" was written by Russ Ballard, Christian Ballard, Sara Eker, Lucy Abbott, Dawn Joseph and Andrew Murray, while the production was helmed by Audius. The song was released as a CD single and digital extended play (EP) on 9 January 2006 as the third and final single from Coulter's self-titled debut album, Ricki-Lee. "Breathe" debuted on the ARIA Singles Chart at number 17 on 16 January 2006 and peaked at number 14 the following week.

== Track listings ==
- CD single
1. "Breathe" (radio edit) – 3:32
2. "Sunshine" (Cabin Crew remix radio edit) – 3:34
3. "Sunshine" (Cabin Crew remix extended mix) – 5:19
4. "Breathe" (instrumental) – 3:32
- Digital EP
1. "Breathe" (radio edit) – 3:32
2. "Sunshine" (Cabin Crew remix radio edit) – 3:34
3. "Sunshine" (Cabin Crew remix extended mix) – 5:19
4. "Breathe" (instrumental) – 3:32
5. "Breathe" (Killer Kitty remix) – 3:41
- Limited-edition digital EP
1. "Breathe" (radio edit) – 3:32
2. "Sunshine" (acoustic) – 3:43
3. "Hell No!" (acoustic) – 3:36
4. "Breathe" (acoustic) – 3:50

== Credits and personnel ==
Credits are adapted from the liner notes of Ricki-Lee: The Singles.

Locations

- Mixed at Sing Sing Studios
- Mastered at Crystal Mastering

Personnel

- Songwriting – Russ Ballard, Christian Ballard, Sara Eker, Lucy Abbott, Dawn Joseph, Andrew Murray
- Production – Audius
- Mixing – Andy Baldwin
- Mastering – John Ruberto

== Charts ==
=== Weekly chart ===
Chart (2006)	Peak position
Australia (ARIA)	14
Australian Urban (ARIA)	5

=== Year-end chart ===
Chart (2006)	Rank
Australian Artists (ARIA)	39
Australian Urban (ARIA)	42

== Release history ==
Region	Date	Format	Label	Ref(s).
Australia	9 January 2006	CD single, digital EP	Shock	
