= Mtawarira =

Mtawarira is a surname. Notable people with the surname include:

- Audius Mtawarira (born 1977), Zimbabwean singer-songwriter and record producer known as Audius
- Tendai Mtawarira (born 1985), Zimbabwean-born South African rugby union player
