= Not Too Late (Ricki-Lee song) =

Single by Ricki-Lee Coulter
- Released: 1 September 2017
- Genre: Pop
- Length: 3:41
- Label: Universal Music Australia
- Songwriters: Ricki-Lee Coulter; Neil Ormandy; Steve Soloma

Ricki-Lee Coulter singles chronology
"Giddyup" (2014)	"Not Too Late" (2017)	"Unbothered" (2018)

Music video
- "Not Too Late" on YouTube

"Not Too Late" is a song recorded by Australian singer and songwriter Ricki-Lee Coulter. It was written by Coulter, Neil Ormandy and Steve Soloma, and released on 1 September 2017. The "lulling, soft ballad" marks a departure from Coulter's previous dance releases, and she said the song is about "redemption and it never being too late to right our wrongs and start again."

== Background and release ==
Coulter and husband/manager Rich Harrison moved to Los Angeles in 2015 and began working on her fifth studio album. The singer spent months writing “empty” formulaic songs or sticking to the dance and R&B genre of her previous hits "Can't Touch It", "Do It Like That" and "Burn It Down".

In an interview with news.com.au's Cameron Adams, Coulter said: "Pivoting musically is scary, but I really have faith in this song. I watch people's faces when they hear it for the first time and their reactions are different to those for any song I've done before. It's such a special song. It still gets me every time." The vocals on the finished version are from the original demo. Coulter said: "I wanted people to hear the pain in these lyrics and feel where this song is coming from. We didn't re-record it — it's the demo vocal I did on the day. I sang the hell out of it and that was it. We thought about re-recording it, but there was something about that vocal that had all that emotion and fury and passion in it."

== Track listing ==
- Digital download
1. "Not Too Late" – 3:41

== Charts ==
Chart (2017)	Peak position
Australia (ARIA)	83

== Release history ==
Country	Date	Format	Label
Australia	1 September 2017	Digital download	Universal Music Australia
