= On Your Own =

On Your Own may refer to:

- "On Your Own" (Blur song), 1997
- "On Your Own" (The Verve song), 1995
- "On Your Own", a song by Jorja Smith from Lost & Found, 2018
- "On Your Own", a 1986 song by Pete Shelley
- "On Your Own (The Land Before Time)", a song from the film The Land Before Time VI: The Secret of Saurus Rock
- "On Your Own", a 1984 song by Billy Squier featured in Giorgio Moroder’s restoration of the film Metropolis

== See also ==
- On My Own (disambiguation)
- On Our Own (disambiguation)
