= Ricki-Lee Coulter =

Australian singer, songwriter, television and radio presenter (born 1985)

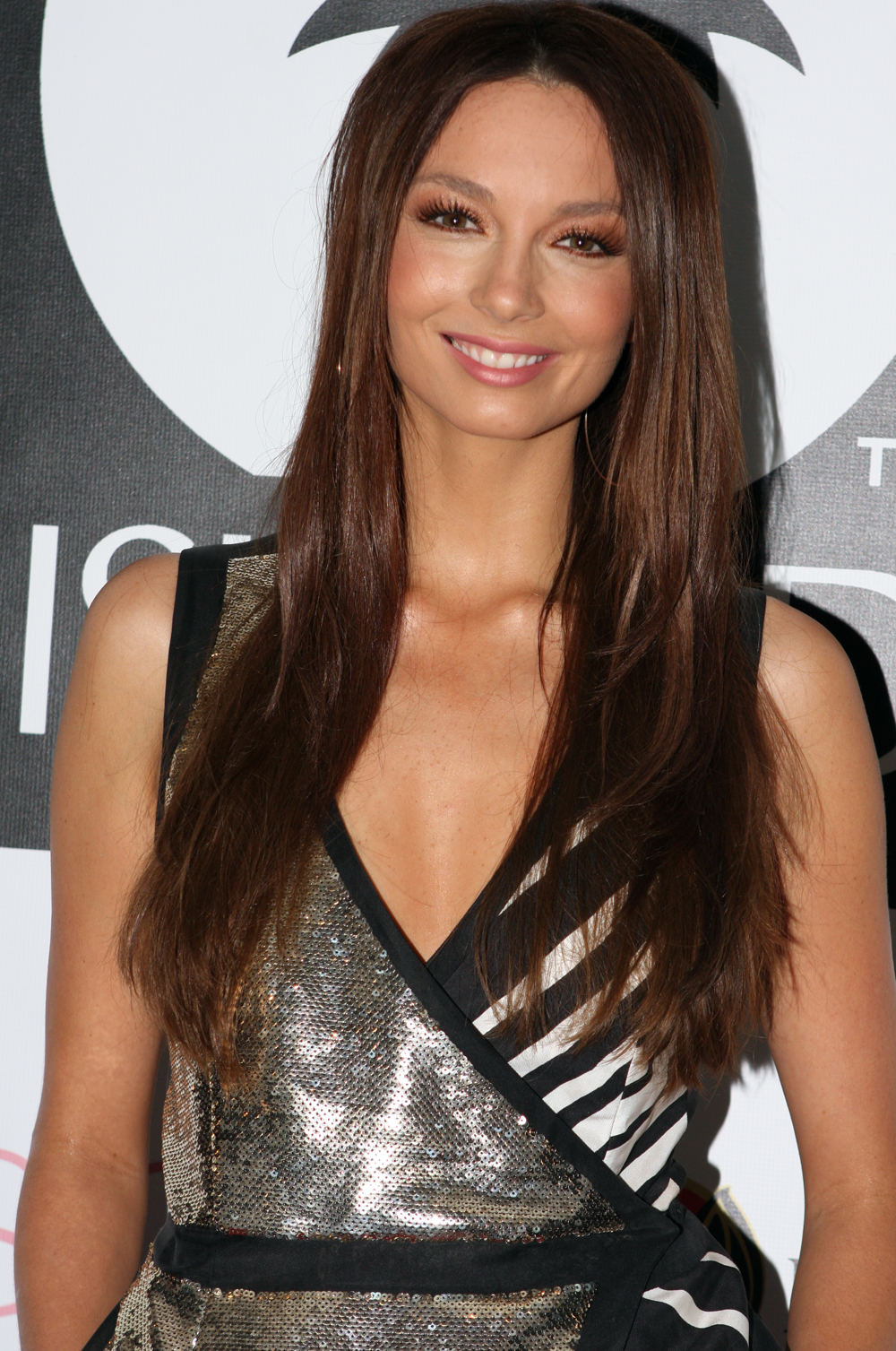
- Coulter in 2012
- Born: Ricki-Lee Dawn Coulter; 10 November 1985 (age 41); Auckland, New Zealand
- Other name: Ricki-Lee
- Occupations: Singer; songwriter; television presenter; radio presenter
- Years active: 2000–present
- Spouses: Jamie Babbington (m. 2007–2008) Richard Harrison (m. 2015)
- Musical career
- Origin: Gold Coast, Queensland, Australia
- Genres: R&B; pop; dance
- Instrument: Vocals
- Labels: Shock (2004–2011); Ministry of Sound; EMI (2011–2015); Universal (2016–2020); Black Label (2023–)
- Formerly of: Young Divas
- Website: ricki-lee.com

Ricki-Lee Dawn Coulter (born 10 November 1985) is an Australian singer-songwriter, television and radio presenter. She was born in Auckland, New Zealand, raised in Gold Coast, Queensland, and began performing at age 15. Coulter rose to fame in 2004 on the second season of Australian Idol and placed seventh in the competition. She subsequently signed with Australian independent label Shock Records, and released her self-titled debut album Ricki-Lee (2005), which produced the top-ten hits "Hell No!" and "Sunshine". Both singles were certified gold by the Australian Recording Industry Association (ARIA). The following year, Coulter became a member of the Australian pop girl group Young Divas, before leaving in early 2007 to resume her solo career.

Coulter's second album Brand New Day (2007) was certified gold and included the top-ten singles "Love Is All Around", "Can't Sing a Different Song" and "Can't Touch It", the latter was certified platinum. Coulter's first compilation album The Singles was released in 2008, featuring the top-twenty single "Wiggle It". In 2011, she ended her contract with Shock Records and signed with major label EMI Music Australia. Coulter's third album Fear & Freedom (2012) debuted at number seven on the ARIA Albums Chart and became her first top-ten album. It included the top-twenty hits "Raining Diamonds" and "Do It Like That", which were both certified platinum. "Do It Like That" was also a top-ten hit on the Billboard Japan Hot 100 chart and earned Coulter her first ARIA Music Award nomination for Song of the Year. Her fourth album Dance in the Rain (2014) became her second top-fifteen album, and featured the top-forty single "All We Need Is Love". Coulter independently released her fifth album On My Own in 2024, which would become her highest-peaking album on the ARIA Albums Chart to date.

Coulter has branched out from recording music, pursuing careers in television and radio. She returned to Australian Idol for seasons six and seven, as a presenter and reporter alongside James Mathison and Andrew Günsberg. The role earned her a nomination at the 2009 Logie Awards for Most Popular New Female Talent. She was also a full-time radio presenter for Sydney's Nova 96.9 breakfast show in 2010, alongside Merrick Watts and Scott Dooley. In 2019, Coulter became the host of Australia's Got Talent. Coulter was announced in September 2022 as the co-host of the 2023 Seven Network reboot of Australian Idol alongside Scott Tweedie.

== Early life ==
Ricki-Lee Dawn Coulter was born on 10 November 1985 in Auckland, New Zealand. Her name is a nod to singer Rickie Lee Jones. Her mother Loretta Sheerin, born in Tonga, was a model. Coulter's parents separated before she was born, and she was raised by her mother. Coulter and her mother relocated to Gold Coast, Queensland when she was three months old. Coulter's father figure at the time was her grandfather Rocky. Coulter's mother gave her every chance to visit her biological father in New Zealand when she was a child. "He wasn't a part of my life. I'd go over there and stay with him and his family, [but] it was just weird to me. Then when I got to an age where I could speak up to Mum, about six or seven, I said, 'I don't want to go; I don't like it.'"

She attended Southport State School and experienced the personal struggles of a lonely childhood as she wanted a life similar to her school friends. "Their mums and dads were married. They had brothers and sisters. They had afternoon tea. They had a cooked dinner. I never had that. I'd get home from school and there was nothing in the cupboard. I would eat mouldy bread and drink water because that would fill me up". Coulter grew up mostly on her own because her mother worked two jobs to pay the bills. During primary school, Coulter participated in many sports, including swimming, touch football and netball, which she played for six years. When Coulter was nine years old, her mother met John, a man of Scottish descent who is now her step father. Coulter has two half-sisters, Jodie and Emily.

As a teenager, she attended Southport State High School. At the age of 15, Coulter had a serious knee injury that required reconstructive surgery. She was told she would never play netball again. Several months later, Coulter's ability to sing was discovered by her mother, who overheard her in her bedroom, which led to her performing at gigs in the Gold Coast and Brisbane areas with live bands. Aside from singing, she also learned how to play several instruments, including the tenor saxophone, flute, and trumpet, and would often play them in school concerts and the school stage band. During high school, Coulter excelled in music and sport. After completing high school in 2002, she decided to focus on her music career, and began writing her own songs with her good friend Xy Latu.

== Music career ==
=== 2003–2004: Australian Idol and Popstars Live ===
In 2003, Coulter auditioned for the first season of Australian Idol but did not make it past the audition rounds. The following year, Coulter successfully auditioned for the first season of Popstars Live and progressed to the top sixty round of the competition but was part of the first group of performers who were sent home. Later that same year, Coulter successfully auditioned for the second season of Australian Idol, singing En Vogue's "Don't Let Go (Love)", and progressed through to the semi-finals. Following the semi-final process, she had advanced through to the top twelve. Throughout the season, Coulter was regarded as a favourite to win the competition because of her performances of Michael Jackson's "Don't Stop 'til You Get Enough", Tina Turner's version of "Proud Mary" and Whitney Houston's "I Have Nothing". In the final seven weeks, Coulter was eliminated from the competition. Following her elimination, "newspapers ran the story as front-page news and Coulter herself couldn't quite hide the anger and disappointment she plainly felt". Like contestant Daniel Belle, who was eliminated the week before her, Coulter never appeared in the bottom three until her elimination.

=== 2005–2007: Ricki-Lee and Young Divas ===
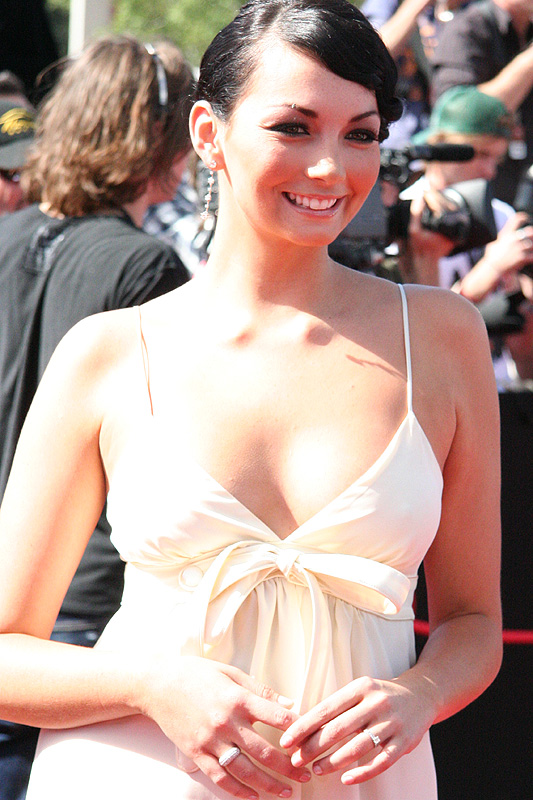
Coulter on the red carpet of the 2006 ARIA Music Awards.

Following her departure from Australian Idol, Coulter was offered recording contracts by record labels including the show's sponsor Sony BMG, but she signed with Australia's biggest independent label Shock Records. Coulter explained, "I'd met with a number of labels and Shock were the only one that asked me what I wanted to do and what kind of album I wanted to make and who I wanted to work with". Her debut single "Hell No!" was released in June 2005, ahead of the related self-titled debut album, Ricki-Lee. The song peaked at number five on the ARIA Singles Chart – remaining in the top-ten for three consecutive weeks. It was eventually certified gold by the Australian Recording Industry Association, for shipments of 35,000 copies. "Sunshine" was released as her second single in September, which peaked at number eight and was also certified gold. Ricki-Lee was released on 3 October 2005, which peaked at number 30 on the ARIA Albums Chart. Coulter collaborated with several producers and songwriters on the album, including Audius Mtawarira, Israel Cruz, Nitty, Jarrad Rogers and Kara DioGuardi, among others. "Breathe" was released as the album's third and final single in January 2006, and reached number 14. At the 2006 Australian and New Zealand Urban Music Awards, Ricki-Lee was nominated for 'Best R&B Album'.

That same year, Coulter joined forces with previous Australian Idol contestants Paulini, Emily Williams and Kate DeAraugo to be part of the all-girl singing project called Young Divas. The project was initially formed to promote a joint 17-date national tour, where all singers would perform their solo material and several songs as a group. Young Divas released a cover version of Donna Summer's single "This Time I Know It's for Real" in May 2006, through Sony BMG, to promote tickets for the tour. A music video was also shot to accompany the song's release. In an interview with the Sydney Morning Herald, DeAraugo stated that they are "not an Idol supergroup, it's just about finding four female voices. It just so happened the four we've gone with are all from Idol. The single is just to promote the tour, just to show a taste of what will be on there, but there won't be an album". Young Divas' version of "This Time I Know It's for Real" peaked at number two and remained in the top-ten for fourteen consecutive weeks. It was eventually certified platinum, for shipments of 70,000 copies. Five months after the single's release, Young Divas released a second single in November 2006, a cover of Lonnie Gordon's "Happenin' All Over Again". The song peaked at number nine and was certified gold.

Their commercial success prompted the release of a debut album of classic disco and pop covers titled, Young Divas, on 27 November 2006, establishing themselves as an official group. The album debuted at number four and was certified double platinum, for shipments of 140,000 copies. A cover of Hazell Dean's "Searchin'" was released as the group's third single, and reached number 40. In February 2007, it was announced that Young Divas had pulled out of their scheduled national tour supporting Irish boy band Westlife, because Coulter had headed overseas to work on her second solo album. The cancellation occurred amid claims that Coulter was set to leave the group, due to personality clashes with DeAraugo. The rumours were denied by the group's manager David Champion, who stated that she would return for the group's next headlining tour and the recording of their second album. However, on 22 June 2007, Coulter announced her departure to resume her solo career and to plan her then-upcoming wedding to fiancé, Jamie Babbington. Jessica Mauboy, who became runner-up on the fourth season of Australian Idol, was Coulter's replacement in the group.

=== 2007–2010: Brand New Day and subsequent releases ===
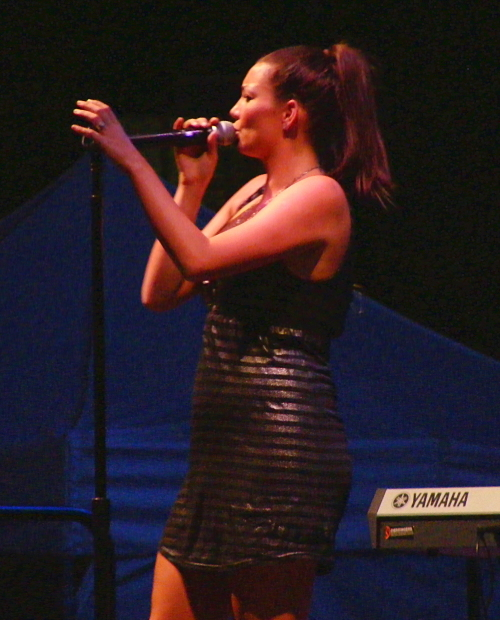
Coulter performing in Tea Tree Gully, South Australia in February 2007.

Coulter released "Can't Touch It" as the lead single from her second album Brand New Day in August 2007. The song peaked at number two and remained in the top-ten for eight consecutive weeks. It is Coulter's most successful single, and was certified platinum in 2008. At the 2007 Jägermeister AIR Awards, "Can't Touch It" was nominated for 'Best Performing Independent Single/EP'. Brand New Day was released on 11 August 2007, which peaked at number 37. Coulter worked with several producers and songwriters on the album, including KNS, David Gamson, Marc Nelkin, Vince Pizzinga, Andrew De Silva, Mtawarira and Glenn Cunningham, among others.

At the 2007 Nickelodeon Australian Kids' Choice Awards, Coulter won the award for 'Fave Female Singer'. Her version of Swedish recording artist Agnes Carlsson's "Love Is All Around" was released as the second single from Brand New Day in November 2007, and peaked at number five. On 18 November 2007, Coulter performed at the first Fluffy Festival in Brisbane alongside acts such as Mr Timothy, Slinkee Minx, Potbelleez, TV Rock, Seany B and Vandalism. A month later, it was announced that Coulter had signed two international record deals, with dance label Ministry of Sound UK and the Japanese independent label Pony Canyon. Brand New Day was released in Japan on 9 January 2008, and peaked at number 242 on the Japanese Albums Chart. That same month, Coulter was a supporting act for Hilary Duff's Australian leg of her Dignity Tour. "Can't Sing a Different Song" was released as the album's third and final single in March 2008, and peaked at number eight. During this time, Coulter embarked on her Brand New Day Tour in Australia, which served as her first solo headlining tour. At the 2008 Nickelodeon Australian Kids' Choice Awards, she received two nominations in the categories of 'Fave Aussie' and 'Fave Singer', and won the latter award. In September 2008, Coulter released "Wiggle It", which peaked at number 11, as the lead single from her first compilation album The Singles. The album was released on 8 November 2008, but failed to impact the charts.

In July 2009, Coulter released "Don't Miss You", which peaked at number 24, as the lead single from her proposed third studio album, Hear No, See No, Speak No. The second single, the title track, was released in October 2009, and peaked at number 46. Hear No, See No, Speak No was originally scheduled to be released in November 2009, but was pushed back for a January 2010 release. Coulter eventually decided to cancel the album's release due to the first two singles struggling on the charts. In March 2010, Coulter was a supporting act for Backstreet Boys' Australian leg of their This Is Us Tour. That same year, her song "Can't Touch It" was featured on the soundtrack to the film, Sex and the City 2. Coulter announced via her official Twitter account on 2 July 2010, that she had parted ways with her manager of five years Lauren Brown. It was then revealed that her new manager was Sean Anderson of the management company 22. Coulter later parted ways with Anderson and became managed by her-then boyfriend Richard Harrison of Black Label Entertainment. Throughout 2010, Coulter put her music career on hold as she took on a full-time position as a breakfast radio presenter for Sydney's Nova 96.9, alongside Merrick Watts and Scott Dooley. During this time, Coulter had thoughts about quitting music. "At the start of [the] year, I couldn't imagine walking in a studio and writing a song again. I didn't even want to get on stage and sing. I was over it. It's hard for me to say that even now. Music is all I've ever wanted to do. I wasn't mentally there any more. I wanted out, it was too hard. I felt like I'd been worn down. I felt defeated". She later stated that after attending a Thirty Seconds to Mars concert in Melbourne and rewatching Michael Jackson's Dangerous Tour DVD, she was inspired to perform again.

=== 2011–2014: Fear & Freedom and Dance in the Rain ===
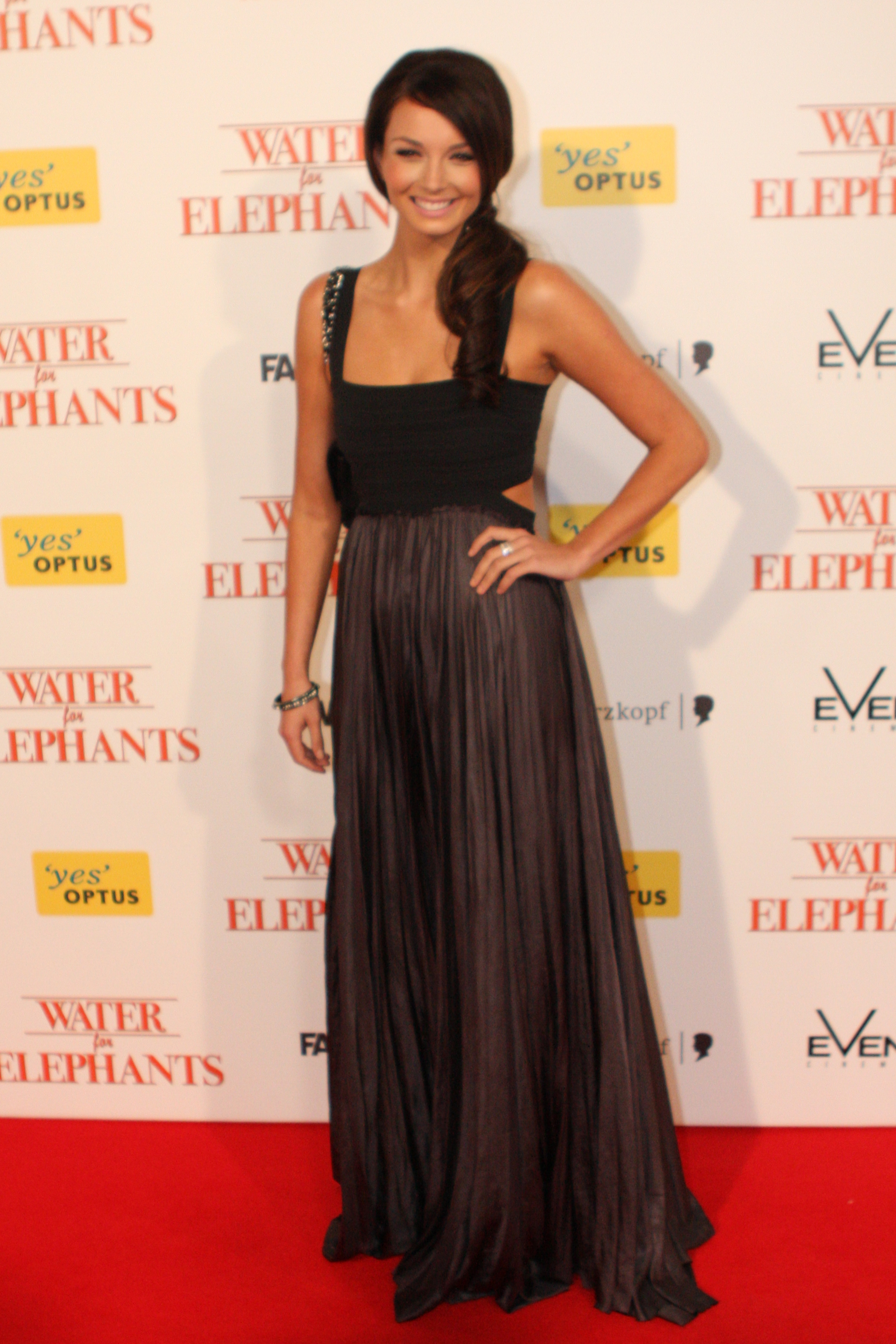
Ricki-Lee Coulter at "Water for Elephants" Sydney premiere, May 2011

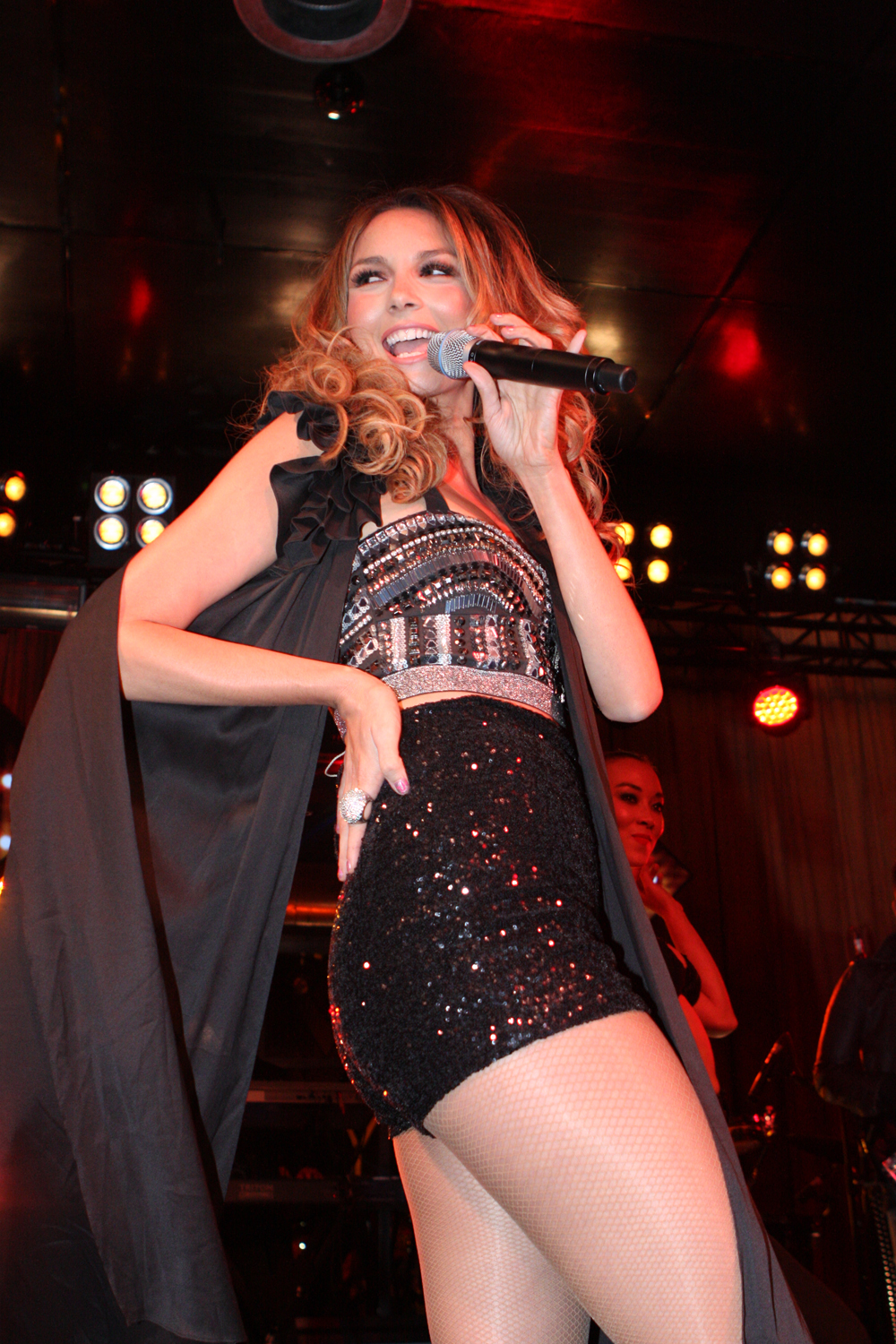
Coulter performing tracks from her third album, Fear & Freedom, at the Beresford Hotel, Sydney in May 2012.

Coulter ended her contract with Shock Records in 2011. Following the release of her single "Raining Diamonds" in October 2011, it was revealed that Coulter had signed a record deal with major label EMI Music Australia. "Raining Diamonds", which peaked at number 19, was the lead single from Coulter's third album, Fear & Freedom, and was certified platinum. It earned her two nominations at the 2011 IT List Awards in the categories of 'Single of 2011' and 'Australian Female Artist'. "Do It Like That", the second single, was released in March 2012, which peaked at number 13 and was certified platinum. It also became Coulter's first single to chart internationally, reaching number seven on the Japan Hot 100 chart. "Do It Like That" earned Coulter her first ARIA Music Award nomination for Song of the Year.

The third single, "Crazy", was released in July 2012, and reached number 46. On 30 May 2012 Coulter first performed tracks from Fear & Freedom, at the Beresford Hotel, Sydney. The album was released on 17 August 2012, which debuted at number seven and became Coulter's first top-ten album as a solo artist. In September 2012, Coulter embarked on her Fear & Freedom Tour in Australia, which served as her second headlining tour. At the 2012 Cosmopolitan Fun, Fearless, Female Women of the Year Awards, Coulter won the award for 'Singer of the Year'. "Burn It Down", the fourth and final single from Fear & Freedom, was released in December 2012, and reached number 49.

"Come & Get in Trouble with Me" was released as Coulter's fourteenth overall single in August 2013, and peaked at number 28. In April–May 2014, Coulter was the supporting act for Jason Derulo's Australian leg of his Tattoos World Tour. In May 2014, she released "All We Need Is Love", which peaked at number 39, as the lead single from her fourth studio album Dance in the Rain. The album's second single, "Happy Ever After", was released in July 2014, and debuted at number 65. Dance in the Rain was released on 17 October 2014, which debuted at number 14 and became Coulter's second top-fifteen album. "Giddyup" was released as the third singles from Dance in the Rain, but failed to chart.

=== 2015–2022: Single releases ===
In 2015 and 2016, Coulter took a break from releasing music and spent two years living and writing songs in Los Angeles. After a three-year hiatus, she released the single "Not Too Late" in September 2017. The "lulling, soft ballad" marks a departure from Coulter's previous dance releases, and is lyrically about "redemption and it never being too late to right our wrongs and start again." "Not Too Late" was released through Universal Music Australia, following their purchase of Coulter's label EMI, and debuted at number 83. In April 2018, Coulter performed at both the opening and closing ceremonies of the 2018 Commonwealth Games, held on the Gold Coast, Queensland. Coulter released the single "Unbothered" in October 2018. "Unbothered" was described by Denise Raward of Sunshine Coast Daily as an "unashamed" pop track with a "cruisy" tone and "sassy" lyrics. Coulter referred to "Unbothered" as an "anthem" that talks about walking "away from shitty people and shitty situations," and "taking control back."

In May 2019, Coulter began to embark on her Ricki-Lee: Live in Concert Tour in Australia, which was held to celebrate her first 15 years in the music industry. The tour featured Coulter performing songs from the film A Star Is Born (2018) and from her time on Australian Idol (2004), as well as her greatest hits as a solo artist and with the Young Divas. Coulter's first music release in two years, the song "Last Night", was released on 12 June 2020.

=== 2023–present: On My Own ===
In March 2023, Ricki-Lee released "On My Own", the first single from her fifth studio album. The second single "Point of No Return" was released on 21 July 2023. In November 2023, Coulter released the third single for the album titled "Ghost" and announced her fifth studio album would be released in March 2024, titled On My Own. The fourth and final single "I Was Made for Loving You" was released on 1 March 2024, and the album officially dropped on 8 March. On My Own debuted at Number 3 on the ARIA Albums Chart being the highest selling album by an Australian artist that week.

== Musical style and influences ==
Coulter's music has ranged from R&B and pop, to electro, rock and dance. Guy Blackman of The Age noted that Coulter's self-titled debut album, Ricki-Lee (2005), "is an infectious collection of R&B-tinged pop tunes that takes a step beyond the usual Idol fodder". Matthew Chisling of Allmusic also noted that the album includes elements of rock, and compared the material to artists such as S Club 7 and Nicole Scherzinger. Her second album, Brand New Day (2007), features upbeat dance songs, with elements of disco, reggae, 40s swing music, 70s jazz pop and motown. The lyrics for the album's third single "Can't Sing a Different Song" are "'kind of bragging' about how happy she and her husband" at the time, Babbington, are. In 2009, Coulter released the singles "Don't Miss You" and "Hear No, See No, Speak No", which showcased a new electropop and rock sound. Coulter admitted that "Don't Miss You" was about ending her relationship with Babbington, saying "it was my first break-up and he was my first boyfriend so I can't lie". Aside from recording music, Coulter has co-written much of her own material. She co-wrote four songs on her debut album, ten songs on her second album, and twelve songs on her third album.

Coulter has said that she grew up listening to artists such as Mariah Carey and Whitney Houston, citing the latter as an influence. She has also named Michael Jackson and Beyoncé as influences, she told Cosmopolitan magazine, "[Beyoncé is] so driven, she pushes herself to the limits and she's achieved so much but she's always looking for what that next thing is and how she can improve from what she's done in the past. She's really setting the benchmark for female artists and I think she kind of is the Michael Jackson of this generation". Critics have compared Coulter's songs "Do It Like That" (2012) and its accompanying music video, as well as "Giddyup" (2014) to Beyoncé's work. Coulter has expressed admiration for other female artists such as Madonna, Pink, Lady Gaga, Katy Perry and Kylie Minogue.

== Other ventures ==
=== Television ===
Coulter appeared as a contestant on the Australian reality television show Celebrity Circus in May 2005, alongside eight other celebrities. The show's task was to train contestants as circus performers. In February 2008, she was a mentor on the third season of the celebrity singing show, It Takes Two, and was partnered with professional golfer and tennis player Scott Draper. Coulter and Draper were the third duo to be eliminated from the competition on 4 March. Later that year, she returned to Australian Idol as a host and reporter alongside James Mathison and Andrew Günsberg. Coulter co-hosted the show for two seasons, and received a nomination at the 2009 Logie Awards for Most Popular New Female Talent. Coulter became a mentor for the first season of The Voice Australia in 2012, and paired up with coach Seal to prepare the contestants in his team for the show's battle rounds. In 2014, Coulter became a contestant on the fourteenth season of Dancing with the Stars Australia and was partnered with professional dancer Jarryd Byrne. She made it to the grand finale and placed third in the competition. Coulter hosted the television program Life Changing Adventures, which premiered on 7Two on 11 June 2017. Filmed in New Zealand's South Island in April 2015, the show featured nine ordinary Australians taking on challenges to raise money and awareness for the CanDo4Kids charity.

In 2019, Coulter became the host of the ninth season of Australia's Got Talent, and returned as host for the tenth season in 2022. In 2022, it was announced that Coulter would be joining the Seven Network reboot of Australian Idol as a co-host alongside Scott Tweedie, after a thirteen-year hiatus from the show.

=== Radio ===
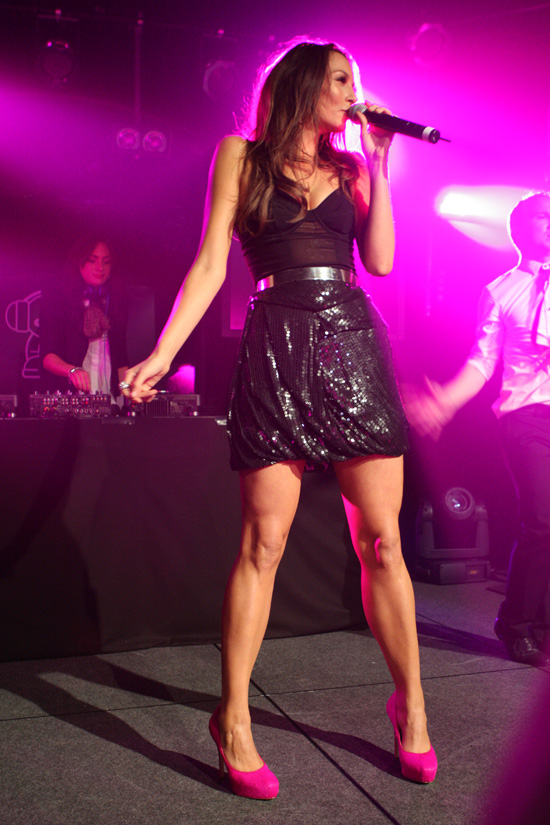
Coulter performing at Nova 96.9's Fitzy & Wippa's For the Love of Sydney Party at The Standard, Darlinghurst in October 2011.

Coulter made her debut as a radio presenter in January 2008, joining B105 FM breakfast team in Brisbane, alongside Labrat, Stav and Camilla. That same year, she co-hosted Melbourne's Fox FM summer breakfast show, alongside Mike Goldman and Brian McFadden. Coulter became a full-time radio presenter for Sydney's Nova 96.9 breakfast show in 2010, alongside Merrick Watts and Scott Dooley. She co-hosted the show for that year only, but received two award nominations: 'Best Newcomer on Air – Metropolitan' at the 2010 Australian Commercial Radio Awards, and 'Radio Host' at the 2010 Cosmopolitan Fun, Fearless, Female Women of the Year Awards.

In October 2022, Coulter began filling in for Kate Ritchie on Nova's nation drive radio show Kate, Tim & Joel. In March 2023, it was announced by Nova that she would permanently join the show as a co-host after Ritchie joined Fitzy & Wippa. She joined remaining hosts Tim Blackwell and Joel Creasy. The show was subsequently renamed Ricki-Lee, Tim & Joel upon her permanent joining of the team.

In January 2026, Nova announced that Coulter and Tim Blackwell would depart Nova’s national drive show to host Ricki-Lee & Tim on Nova 96.9's Sydney breakfast program.

=== Endorsements ===
Coulter became the ambassador for Australian shapewear clothing line Hold Me Tight in 2008, appearing in several promotional campaigns as the face and body of the line. Hold Me Tight's collection was only launched at Big W stores across Australia and The Warehouse branches in New Zealand. In May 2012, she became the face of the 2012 Woolworths Earn & Learn program, which aims at delivering "millions of dollars worth of educational resources" to primary and secondary schools in Australia. She appeared in a television commercial for the program, featuring students from Darcy Road Primary School in Wentworthville, New South Wales. Later that month, it was announced that Coulter was the new Australian face for international cosmetics brand CoverGirl, replacing model Jennifer Hawkins who had been with the brand since 2006.

In 2013, Coulter teamed up with Cotton on Body to release her own range of dancewear pieces and intimates called Ricki-Lee Army. The collection included sequin printed tanks, all-over sequin hoodie jackets, mesh long-sleeve tops and printed knickers. It was made available to buy online from 22 August 2013 and in-stores from 26 August 2013.

=== Philanthropy ===
In 2007 and 2008, Coulter was an ambassador for McHappy Day, an annual fundraising event by McDonald's that supports the Ronald McDonald House Charities and provides much needed programs and services to seriously ill children and their families. In 2008, Coulter became the face of Jeans for Genes Day in Australia, a charity fundraising event organised by the Children's Medical Research Institute which sponsors investigation into childhood genetic diseases. Coulter has supported the charity since she was in high school. She raised $100,000 for the campaign, including profits made from her nude photo shoot with Cleo magazine. Alongside recording artist Marcia Hines, Coulter became a spokeswoman for the annual Australian red ribbon appeal in November 2011, raising money in the fight against HIV and AIDS, and helping people with HIV. A month later, on 19 December 2011, she performed at the Pitt Street Mall in Sydney, as part of the Optus Celebrity Carols initiative to raise money for The Smith Family, a charity benefiting disadvantaged children and their families. In 2015, Coulter became an ambassador for McHappy Day again.

== Personal life ==
At age 15, Coulter met Jamie Babbington, a builder from the Gold Coast who was aged 23 at the time. They started "dating seriously" after about a year. Coulter and Babbington married at a secret location in Canungra, Queensland on 7 September 2007. Coulter took her husband's last name and became Ricki-Lee Babbington. The couple had their honeymoon in the Maldives for five weeks. The following year, on 18 October 2008, Coulter's publicist issued a statement that they had separated due to "distance and time apart". In an interview with Herald Sun's Jonathan Moran, three years after the marriage ended, Coulter revealed that she had experienced depression during her relationship with Babbington. "I was living my dream but behind closed doors my personal life was a mess. [...] I felt alone, I bottled it all up and it made things worse. I wanted to give up everything. I wouldn't leave the house for days at a time. I'd sit in the house all day and do nothing".

In September 2009, Coulter began dating her manager Richard Harrison, and in August 2010, the couple went public with their relationship. Before meeting Harrison, Coulter was considered a role model for curvy girls and stated that she was proud of being a size 14 woman. She has since lost over 30 kilograms, which has transformed her into a size 8. The couple announced their engagement in the 7 January 2013 issue of New Idea magazine. After two years of being engaged, Coulter and Harrison married at the Château Bouffémont in Paris, France, on 5 August 2015. Coulter appeared on the cover of the 17 August 2015 issue of New Idea in her wedding dress.

Coulter is a supporter of the LGBT community and has stated, "So many of my fans, supporters and closest friends identify as gay." Over the years, she has performed at many gay nightclubs and LGBT-related events, including the Sydney Gay and Lesbian Mardi Gras. Coulter has been a long-time supporter of gay rights and issues, including same-sex marriage in Australia.

== Discography ==
- Ricki-Lee (2005)
- Brand New Day (2007)
- Fear & Freedom (2012)
- Dance in the Rain (2014)
- On My Own (2024)

== Tours ==
Headlining

- The Brand New Day Tour (2008)
- Fear & Freedom Tour (2012)
- Ricki-Lee: Live in Concert Tour (2019)

Co-headlining

- Young Divas Tour with Paulini, Emily Williams and Kate DeAraugo (2006)

Supporting act

- Hilary Duff's Dignity Tour: Australian leg (2008)
- Backstreet Boys' This Is Us Tour: Australian leg (2010)
- Jason Derulo's Tattoos World Tour: Australian leg (2014)
- Take That's This Life on Tour: Australian leg (2024)

== Television ==
Year	Title	Role	Notes
2004, 2008–09, 2023–present	Australian Idol	Herself	Contestant (2004), Co-host (2008–present)
2005	Celebrity Circus	Herself	Celebrity contestant
2008	It Takes Two	Herself	Mentor
2012	The Voice Australia	Herself	Mentor
2014, 2022	Dancing with the Stars Australia	Herself	Celebrity contestant
2017	Life Changing Adventures	Herself	Host
2019–present	Australia's Got Talent	Herself	Host
2027	I’m a Celebrity…Get Me Out of Here!	Herself	Host, alongside Jim Jefferies

== Awards and nominations ==
Year	Type	Recipient	Award	Result
2006	Nickelodeon Australian Kids' Choice Awards	Ricki-Lee Coulter	Fave Australian Artist	Won
2006	Nickelodeon Australian Kids' Choice Awards	Young Divas	Fave Group	Nominated
2006	Nickelodeon Australian Kids' Choice Awards	"This Time I Know It's for Real" with Young Divas	Fave Song	Won
2006	Urban Music Awards (Australia and New Zealand)	Ricki-Lee	Best R&B Album	Nominated
2007	Nickelodeon Australian Kids' Choice Awards	Ricki-Lee Coulter	Fave Female Singer	Won
2007	AIR Awards	"Can't Touch It"	Best Performing Independent Single/EP	Nominated
2008	AIR Awards	"Can't Sing a Different Song"	Best Independent Single/EP	Nominated
2008	AIR Awards	Ricki-Lee Coulter	Best Independent Artist	Nominated
2008	Nickelodeon Australian Kids' Choice Awards	Ricki-Lee Coulter	Fave Aussie	Nominated
2008	Nickelodeon Australian Kids' Choice Awards	Ricki-Lee Coulter	Fave Singer	Won
2009	Logie Awards	Ricki-Lee Coulter	Most Popular New Female Talent	Nominated
2010	MusicOz Awards	"Don't Miss You"	Best Video	Nominated
2010	Australian Commercial Radio Awards	Ricki-Lee Coulter	Best Newcomer on Air (Metropolitan)	Nominated
2010	Cosmopolitan Fun, Fearless, Female Women of the Year Awards	Ricki-Lee Coulter	Radio Host	Nominated
2011	Poprepublic.tv IT List Awards	"Raining Diamonds"	Single of 2011	Nominated
2011	Poprepublic.tv IT List Awards	Ricki-Lee Coulter	Australian Female Artist	Nominated
2012	Cosmopolitan Fun, Fearless, Female Women of the Year Awards	Ricki-Lee Coulter	Singer of the Year	Won
2012	ARIA Music Awards	"Do It Like That"	Song of the Year	Nominated
2012	Channel [V] Awards	Ricki-Lee Coulter	[V] Oz Artist of the Year	Nominated
2012	Poprepublic.tv IT List Awards	Ricki-Lee Coulter	Favourite Australian Female Artist	Nominated
2013	Channel [V] Awards	Ricki-Lee Coulter	[V] Oz Artist of the Year	Nominated
2013	Poprepublic.tv Awards	"Come & Get in Trouble with Me"	Favourite Single of 2013	Nominated
