= Ricki-Lee (album) =

Studio album by Ricki-Lee Coulter
- Released: 3 October 2005
- Recorded: 2005 in Melbourne
- Genres: Pop; R&B
- Length: 49:14
- Label: Shock
- Producers: Bobby Bass; Lukas Burton; Israel Cruz; JRemy; Audius Mtawarira; Jarrad Rogers; Michael Szumowski

Ricki-Lee Coulter chronology
Ricki-Lee (2005)	Brand New Day (2007)

Singles from Ricki-Lee
- 1. "Hell No!" Released: 13 June 2005; 2. "Sunshine" Released: 26 September 2005; 3. "Breathe" Released: 9 January 2006

Ricki-Lee is the debut studio album by Australian recording artist Ricki-Lee Coulter, released through Shock Records on 3 October 2005. Coulter recorded the album in Melbourne and worked with several songwriters and producers, including Audius Mtawarira, Israel Cruz, Jarrad Rogers, Hayley Aitken and Kara DioGuardi, among others. The album reached number 30 on the ARIA Albums Chart and number six on the ARIA Urban Albums Chart. Ricki-Lee was preceded by the lead single "Hell No!" in June 2005, which peaked at number five on the ARIA Singles Chart and was certified gold by the Australian Recording Industry Association (ARIA). The second single "Sunshine" was released in September 2005, which peaked at number eight and was also certified gold. "Breathe" was released as the album's third and final single in January 2006, which reached number 14.

== Background and reception ==
Following her departure from Australian Idol in 2004, Coulter was offered recording contracts by record labels including the show's sponsor Sony BMG, but she signed with Australia's biggest independent label Shock Records. Coulter explained, "I'd met with a number of labels and Shock were the only one that asked me what I wanted to do and what kind of album I wanted to make and who I wanted to work with". She recorded her debut album in Melbourne. Ricki-Lee was released on 3 October 2005, as both digital download and CD formats.

Matthew Chisling of Allmusic gave the album three out of five stars, and was critical of its musical direction. He added that "the album never truly solidifies Coulter enough to warrant her immediate approval by a widespread audience, since she is divided so heavily between styles and influences that don't always suit her". Guy Blackman of The Age stated that the album is "an infectious collection of R&B-tinged pop tunes that takes a step beyond the usual Idol fodder". At the 2006 Australian and New Zealand Urban Music Awards, Ricki-Lee was nominated for Best R&B Album. Ricki-Lee debuted and peaked on the ARIA Albums Chart at number 30 on 10 October 2005. The album performed better on the ARIA Urban Albums Chart, where it peaked at number six.

== Track listing ==
No.	Title	Writer(s)	Producer(s)	Length
1.	"Turn It Up"	Ricki-Lee Coulter; Michael Szumowski; Hayley Aitken; Peter Gono	Michael Szumowski	3:20
2.	"Sunshine"	Coulter; Zukhan Bey; Lukas Burton; Kara DioGuardi; Norman Johnson; Barney Perkins; Gregory Perry; Jarrad Rogers	Rogers; Burton*	3:02
3.	"Can You Feel It?"	Coulter; Israel Cruz; Catherine Chamoun	Cruz	3:18
4.	"Hell No!"	Audius Mtawarira; Andy Love; Cheryline Lim	Mtawarira	3:13
5.	"Something About You Babe"	Mtawarira; Aitken	Mtawarira	3:06
6.	"Breathe"	Andrew Murray; Christian Ballard; Dawn Joseph; Lucy Abbott; Russ Ballard; Sara Eker	Mtawarira	3:45
7.	"Let Me Hear You Say" (featuring Nitty)	Coulter; Cruz; Ali Bertan; Frank Ross	Cruz	3:29
8.	"Vibe Is Right"	Jeremy 'JRemy' Skaller; Robert W. 'Bobby Bass' Larow; Stannis Smith	JRemy; Bobby Bass	3:43
9.	"Stay with Me"	Aitken; Mtawarira	Mtawarira	3:52
10.	"Tell Him"	Cruz; Cassie	Cruz	3:54
11.	"Done with It"	Coulter; Mtawarira	Mtawarira	3:48
12.	"Listen Up!"	Jarrad Rogers; Carmen Knight	Rogers	3:31
13.	"Hello" (featuring Stan Bravo)	Cruz; Aitken; Bertan; Samuel Campbell	Cruz	3:56
14.	"Being Human"	Adam Anders; Pamela Sheyne; Nikki Hassman; Skaller; Larow	JRemy; Bass	3:09
Total length:				49:14

iTunes bonus track
No.	Title	Length
15.	"Sunshine" (Cabin Crew Remix)	3:35

Notes

- (*) Denotes co-producer

== Charts ==
Chart performance for Ricki-Lee
Chart (2005)	Peak position
Australian Albums (ARIA)	30
Australian Urban Albums (ARIA)	6

== Release history ==
Country	Date	Format	Label
Australia	3 October 2005	CD, digital download	Shock Records
