= Raining Diamonds =

2011 single by Ricki-Lee Coulter

Single by Ricki-Lee Coulter

from the album Fear & Freedom
- Released: 18 October 2011
- Recorded: New York City
- Genre: Dance-pop
- Length: 3:04
- Label: EMI
- Songwriters: Billy Mann; Ricki-Lee Coulter
- Producer: Boyblue

Ricki-Lee Coulter singles chronology
"Hear No, See No, Speak No" (2009)	"Raining Diamonds" (2011)	"Do It Like That" (2012)

Music video
- "Raining Diamonds" on YouTube

"Raining Diamonds" is a song by Australian recording artist Ricki-Lee Coulter. It was written by Coulter, Billy Mann and Boyblue, who also produced the song. "Raining Diamonds" was released digitally on 18 October 2011 as the lead single from Coulter's third studio album Fear & Freedom (2012). The song serves as Coulter's debut release with EMI, after parting ways with her former record label Shock Records in May 2011. Lyrically, Coulter stated that the song is "all about knowing your value and not settling for less than what you believe you are worth."

"Raining Diamonds" peaked at number 19 on the ARIA Singles Chart and was certified platinum by the Australian Recording Industry Association for selling over 70,000 copies. An accompanying music video was directed by Krozm and features Coulter channelling a warrior princess. She promoted the song with performances on The X Factor Australia and Sunrise.

== Background and release ==
Coulter's third studio album, originally titled Hear No, See No, Speak No, was scheduled for release in November 2009, but was later pushed back to January 2010. However, following the two unsuccessful singles "Don't Miss You" and the title track, Coulter told her record label Shock Records to cancel the album's release. In an interview with News.com.au, she said, "They got a lukewarm reaction to the singles they chose to put out, so it made sense not to release the album. I said I'd prefer the album not to go out than to go out and fail." In 2010, Coulter took a break from her music career as she took on a full-time position as a breakfast radio presenter for Sydney's Nova 96.9, alongside Merrick Watts and Scott Dooley. In May 2011, Coulter ended her contract with Shock Records. In an interview with Auspop, she stated that "Raining Diamonds" was originally planned to be released through the label, but they "fell into financial trouble." As a result, Coulter asked to be released from her contract. She then signed with major label EMI. "Raining Diamonds" was released digitally and sent to Australian contemporary hit radio stations on 18 October 2011. A week later, it became the most added song to radio.

== Writing and recording ==
After her contract with Nova FM ended, Coulter began working on new music and started contacting songwriters and producers she had worked with before, in addition to contacting new songwriters such as Billy Mann. Mann had previously heard Coulter's single "Can't Touch It" (2007) and invited her to New York City to work with him. However, when Coulter arrived, she ended up working with his producing partner Boyblue. Mann later arrived to hear what they had recorded and decided to spend the rest of the week working with Coulter. In an interview with Auspop, she stated:

The next morning I got there, he said that he couldn't stop thinking about me overnight. He said, 'I couldn't stop thinking about that voice. And I've figured it out. Your song is going to be called 'Raining Diamonds'. Then he picked up his guitar and started strumming the chords and said 'and the first line is going to be ... I declare war on love' and just sang. ... He had written the first line and then I came up with 'Finally I ran out of pages and I declare war on love'. That was the process of writing.

Lyrically, Coulter said that "Raining Diamonds" is "all about knowing your value and not settling for less than what you believe you are worth." According to Cameron Adams of the Herald Sun, "the song details Ricki-Lee's path to self-discovery and self-worth, following a public divorce and now a two-year relationship with personal trainer Rich Harrison."

== Chart performance ==
On 24 October 2011, "Raining Diamonds" debuted at number 62 on the ARIA Singles Chart. It peaked at number 19 on 21 November 2011 and became Coulter's eighth top twenty single on the chart. "Raining Diamonds" was certified platinum by the Australian Recording Industry Association for selling over 70,000 copies.

== Promotion ==
Coulter performed "Raining Diamonds" on The X Factor Australia (8 November 2011) and Sunrise (9 November 2011). In April–May 2014, Coulter was the supporting act for Jason Derulo's Australian leg of his Tattoos World Tour, where she performed the song as part of her set list.

=== Music video ===
The music video was directed by Krozm (Chris Hill and Lachlan Dickie). A behind-the-scenes video of the shoot was uploaded exclusively onto the Take 40 Australia website on 24 November 2011. In an interview with the Herald Sun, Coulter stated that the video would include a "semi-naked man slave." The official video clip premiered on 2 December 2011. The futuristic-themed video features Coulter, wearing a metallic leotard with pointy shoulder pads, channelling a warrior princess. She is accompanied by two fembot dancers and they perform choreographed routines near shiny diamonds and flashing light sabers.

== Track listing ==
- Digital download
1. "Raining Diamonds" – 3:04

== Credits and personnel ==
Credits adapted from the liner notes of Fear & Freedom.

Locations

- Mixed at Super Sonic Scale.

Personnel

- Songwriting – Billy Mann, Boyblue, Ricki-Lee Coulter
- Production – Boyblue
- Engineering – Boyblue
- Mixing – Veronica Ferraro
- Mastering – Bruno Ferraro

== Charts ==
=== Weekly charts ===
Chart (2011)	Peak position
Australia (ARIA)	19

=== Year-end charts ===
Chart (2011)	Rank
Australian Artists (ARIA)	15

== Certifications ==
Region	Certification	Certified units/sales
Australia (ARIA)	Platinum	70,000^{^}
^{^} Shipments figures based on certification alone.

== Release history ==
Country	Date	Format	Label
Australia	18 October 2011	Contemporary hit radio	EMI Music Australia
Australia	18 October 2011	Digital download	EMI Music Australia
