= Last Night (Ricki-Lee song) =

2020 song by Ricki-Lee Coulter

Single by Ricki-Lee Coulter
- Released: 12 June 2020
- Recorded: 2019–20
- Genre: Dance-pop
- Length: 3:18
- Label: Black Label Entertainment
- Songwriters: Ricki-Lee Coulter; Janeva Burrill; Ava Hayz; Throttle
- Producer: Throttle

Ricki-Lee Coulter singles chronology
"Unbothered" (2018)	"Last Night" (2020)	"On My Own" (2023)

Lyric video
- "Last Night" on YouTube

"Last Night" is a song recorded by Australian singer and songwriter Ricki-Lee Coulter. It was written by Coulter and Australian DJ Throttle, and was released independently via Black Label Entertainment on 12 June 2020. Upon release the song topped the iTunes chart in Australia.

== Background ==
Coulter announced the single and its release date on 1 June 2020 through Instagram.

"Last Night" is Coulter's first music release in two years, following the 2018 single "Unbothered". In an interview with Sunrise, Coulter announced its release and said "I'm pumped for you to hear this song, it's been a long time coming."

Music forum auspOp described the single as "her returning to her dance/pop roots" with Coulter explaining:

"When I toured last year – it reminded me how much my fans love me for uplifting, feel-good music they can dance to. I played the State Theatre in Sydney, which is usually filled with quite a conservative crowd, but after the show they told me they had never seen a crowd jumping up and down and singing like that! And it made me realise I've gotta give the fans what they want, what they love."

== Reception ==
In a review of the song, Women In Pop said 'Last Night' was "a sensuous, low key banger with a pulsing bassline reminiscent of 70s funk married with a multi-layered cascade of electronic beats". Thomas Bleach described the song as "an apocalyptic pop song that radiates love, and explores that pure infatuation that charges through [Ricki-Lee's] veins when she's around [her husband]" and that it "makes you want to hit a crowded dance floor immediately". Out in Perth described it as "a song for our times" and said it's "the kind of dance tune we all love to gear [sic] from the Australian singer".

== Track listing ==
Digital download
No.	Title	Length
1.	"Last Night"	3:18

== Charts ==
Chart (2020)	Peak position
Australia Airplay (Radiomonitor)	28
Australia Digital Song Sales (Billboard)	3

== Release history ==
Country	Date	Format	Label
Australia	12 June 2020	Digital download; streaming	Black Label Entertainment
