= Sunshine (Ricki-Lee song) =

2005 single by Ricki-Lee Coulter

Single by Ricki-Lee Coulter

from the album Ricki-Lee
- B-side: "Gotta Know"
- Released: 26 September 2005
- Length: 3:02
- Label: Shock
- Songwriters: Kara DioGuardi; Lukas Burton; Zukhan Bey; Norman Johnson; Gregory Perry; Ricki-Lee Coulter; Jarrad Rogers
- Producers: Jarrad Rogers; Lukas Burton

Ricki-Lee Coulter singles chronology
"Hell No!" (2005)	"Sunshine" (2005)	"Breathe" (2006)

"Sunshine" is a song by Australian singer Ricki-Lee Coulter from her self-titled debut album, Ricki-Lee (2005). It was released both physically and digitally on 26 September 2005, as the second single from the album. "Sunshine" peaked at number eight on the Australian ARIA Singles Chart and was certified gold by the Australian Recording Industry Association for shipments of 35,000 copies. The music video for the song was directed by Bart Borghesi.

== Background and release ==
"Sunshine" was written by Kara DioGuardi, Lukas Burton, Zukhan Bey, Norman Johnson, Gregory Perry, Ricki-Lee Coulter and Jarrad Rogers. It was co-produced by Rogers and Burton. In an interview with The Age, Coulter said "Sunshine" is a "happy and in love song" with a motown feel. "Sunshine" contains elements of the 1971 song "Want Ads" by American R&B girl group Honey Cone. Coulter said the sample gives the song "that happy 70s feel".

"Sunshine" was released as a CD single and digital extended play (EP) on 26 September 2005, as the second single from Coulter's self-titled debut album, Ricki-Lee. "Sunshine" debuted on the ARIA Singles Chart at number 14 on 3 October 2005. It peaked at number eight in its fourth week on the chart. "Sunshine" was certified gold by the Australian Recording Industry Association for shipments of 35,000 copies.

== Music video ==
The music video for "Sunshine" was directed by Bart Borghesi and filmed in Melbourne. It features Coulter singing in a house, which is 3D animated, surrounded by animated spotlights.

== Track listing ==
- CD single and digital EP
1. "Sunshine" – 3:02
2. "Gotta Know" – 3:27
3. "Sunshine" (instrumental) – 3:02

== Credits and personnel ==
Credits are adapted from the liner notes of Ricki-Lee: The Singles.

Locations

- Mixed at Sing Sing Studios
- Mastered at Crystal Mastering

Personnel

- Songwriting – Kara DioGuardi, Lukas Burton, Zukhan Bey, Norman Johnson, Gregory Perry, Ricki-Lee Coulter, Jarrad Rogers
- Production – Jarrad Rogers, Lukas Burton
- Additional vocals – Kushy
- Mixing – Andy Baldwin
- Mastering – John Ruberto

== Charts ==
=== Weekly chart ===
Chart (2005)	Peak position
Australia (ARIA)	8
Australian Urban (ARIA)	4

=== Year-end charts ===
Chart (2005)	Rank
Australia (ARIA)	80
Australian Artists (ARIA)	20

== Certifications ==
Region	Certification	Certified units/sales
Australia (ARIA)	Gold	35,000^{^}
^{^} Shipments figures based on certification alone.

== Release history ==
Region	Date	Format(s)	Label	Catalogue	Ref(s).
Australia	26 September 2005	CD single; digital EP	Shock	PUBLIC004	
