= Come & Get in Trouble with Me =

Single by Ricki-Lee Coulter
- Released: 30 August 2013
- Genre: Dance-pop, house, disco, electro
- Length: 3:05
- Label: EMI
- Songwriters: Ricki-Lee Coulter; Stuart Crichton; Amie Miriello
- Producer: Stuart Crichton

Ricki-Lee Coulter singles chronology
"Burn It Down" (2012)	"Come & Get in Trouble with Me" (2013)	"All We Need Is Love" (2014)

Music video
- "Come & Get in Trouble with Me" on YouTube

"Come & Get in Trouble with Me" is a song recorded by Australian singer and songwriter Ricki-Lee Coulter. It was released as a digital download on 30 August 2013. The song was written by Coulter, Stuart Crichton and Amie Miriello, and produced by Crichton. Backed by a heavy bass, "Come & Get in Trouble with Me" is a dance-pop song that contains influences of disco, electro and house music. The song received positive reviews from most critics, who praised its composition and sound.

"Come & Get in Trouble with Me" debuted and peaked at number 28 on the ARIA Singles Chart. The accompanying music video was directed by Marc Furmie and Coulter, and features scenes of Coulter in a Studio 54-inspired nightclub. The video received a positive reception from critics, but a mixed reaction from fans due to its overtly sexual content. Coulter promoted the song with performances on The X Factor Australia and Australia's Next Top Model.

== Writing and production ==
"Come & Get in Trouble with Me" is a dance-pop song that features disco, electro and house music influences, and a heavy bass. The song was written by Ricki-Lee Coulter, Stuart Crichton and Amie Miriello at the Universal Music/APRA Invitational Bali Songwriting Camp in May 2013. It was produced by Crichton and mixed by Trevor Muzzy. In a radio interview with Nova FM, Coulter spoke of the inspiration behind the lyrics, saying that she is not the type of "girl that sits at home on a Saturday night plaiting her girlfriend's hair, drinking tea and watching romantic comedies. I'm a strip club-going, champagne-spraying party girl and I wanted to write a song about that." Coulter also revealed that she was inspired by 1970s disco music. "I'd been listening to some old 70s disco, soul stuff and I thought lets go into the studio and do something different. Lets do something that's super unashamedly pop and fun and danceable. Trouble is what we did."

"Come & Get in Trouble with Me" was made available for digital purchase on 30 August 2013. Two remixes of the song were released digitally on 25 October 2013. "Come & Get in Trouble with Me" was originally released as the lead single from Coulter's fourth studio album Dance in the Rain, but was later excluded from the album track listing and "All We Need Is Love" was released as its new lead single.

== Reception ==
Sam Lansky from Idolator wrote that "Come & Get in Trouble with Me" is "the finest summer dance-pop song that just missed the season, and practically a Kylie Minogue tribute (in the best possible way)." Lansky also noted that it features "a monster Guetta-style beat that leads into a huge pop chorus." Adam Bub from MusicFix described the track as a "disco stomper", while Brettney from Scoopla called it an "electro-infused anthemic pop gem." Take 40 Australia noted that "Come & Get in Trouble with Me" is "much more club ready" than Coulter's previous singles, and wrote that "her vocals are still showcased beautifully" in the song. They concluded, "We can see this song being a proper party starter, perfect for livening up a BBQ or a dance floor."

The Australian Recording Industry Association called it a "club-friendly" track that "is a step in a different direction from Ricki's pop past." Jacques Peterson from Popdust wrote that "Come & Get in Trouble with Me" is "easily the biggest and best thing she's done to date." Poprepublic.tv gave the song a mixed review, writing that it sounds "rather flat lined" and "not really lyrically fabulous." Upon its release, "Come & Get in Trouble with Me" debuted and peaked at number 28 on the ARIA Singles Chart dated 9 September 2013. The following week, the song dropped to number 49 and in its third week, fell to number 95.

== Promotion ==
Coulter performed "Come & Get in Trouble with Me" on The X Factor Australia (2 September 2013), Australia's Next Top Model (24 September 2013), and during a free concert by Channel V Australia at Federation Square, Melbourne (25 September 2013). In April–May 2014, Coulter was the supporting act for Jason Derulo's Australian leg of his Tattoos World Tour, where she performed the song as part of her set list.

=== Music video ===
The music video was directed by Marc Furmie and Coulter, and filmed in Sydney on 25–26 July 2013. On 16 August 2013, Coulter released a 16-second teaser of the video showing her pouring a bottle of champagne down the chest of another woman before leaning in to kiss her. That same day, an image from the video was posted on Coulter's Instagram account showing her wearing a blonde wig and riding on a white horse naked. The image received a mixed reaction from her fans. The official video clip was released on 3 September 2013 with an explicit warning on YouTube. It takes place in a Studio 54-inspired nightclub and features scenes of Coulter dancing with several people, surrounded by topless women, kissing another woman, riding a horse naked (a reference to Lady Godiva's naked protest), and covered in gold paint topless.

The video received positive reviews from critics, but a mixed reaction from fans due to its overtly sexual content. MusicFix wrote that Coulter looked "better than ever" in the video and that she "is now a bona fide Aussie pop queen ... and she is out to prove it!." Jacques Peterson from Popdust called it Australia's answer to Robin Thicke's "Blurred Lines" video, while Dan Hill from Scoopla wrote that it is "The best Aussie dance video since Sophie Ellis-Bextor's 'Murder on the Dancefloor'." Take 40 Australia praised Coulter for "showing a more edgy side to herself." Within 24 hours of its release, the video had already received over 30,000 views on YouTube.

== Track listing ==
- Digital download
1. "Come & Get in Trouble with Me" – 3:05
- Digital download – Remixes
1. "Come & Get in Trouble with Me" (John Dahlbäck Remix) – 5:47
2. "Come & Get in Trouble with Me" (Zoolanda Remix) – 5:51

== Credits and personnel ==
- Ricki-Lee Coulter – vocals, songwriter, executive producer
- Stuart Crichton – songwriter, producer
- Amie Miriello – songwriter
- Trevor Muzzy – audio mixer

== Charts ==
Chart (2013)	Peak position
Australia (ARIA)	28

== Release history ==
Country	Date	Format	Version(s)	Label
Australia	30 August 2013	Digital download	Main version	EMI Music Australia
Australia	25 October 2013	Digital download	Remixes	EMI Music Australia
