= Hell No! =

2005 single by Ricki-Lee Coulter

Single by Ricki-Lee Coulter

from the album Ricki-Lee
- B-side: "Over the Rainbow"
- Released: 13 June 2005
- Genre: Dance
- Length: 3:13
- Label: Shock
- Songwriters: Audius Mtawarira; Andy Love; Cheryline Lim
- Producer: Audius

Ricki-Lee Coulter singles chronology
| "Hell No!" (2005) | "Sunshine" (2005) |

"Hell No!" is the debut single of Australian singer Ricki-Lee Coulter. It was released on 13 June 2005 as the lead single from her self-titled debut album, Ricki-Lee (2005). "Hell No!" debuted and peaked at number five on the ARIA Singles Chart and was certified gold by the Australian Recording Industry Association for shipments of 35,000 copies. The music video for the song was directed by Bart Borghesi and filmed at Flinders Street, Melbourne.

== Background and reception ==
"Hell No!" was written by Audius Mtawarira, Andy Love and Cheryline Lim, and produced by Mtawarira. It was released as a CD single on 13 June 2005, serving as the lead single from Ricki-Lee. Lyrically, the song is about Coulter being frustrated with life. According to The Hot Hits, "Hell No!" has the "in your face yet tongue in cheek attitude" and wrote that "the hot grooved, up-tempo track is perhaps not what many people expected from the 19 year old, 2004 Idol favourite". The Age noted that "Hell No!" has "a funky street feel to it". Matthew Chisling of Allmusic wrote "Coulter's versatile voice booms proudly" on the song. "Hell No!" debuted and peaked at number five on the ARIA Singles Chart on 20 June 2005 and spent three consecutive weeks in the top ten. The song was certified gold by the Australian Recording Industry Association for shipments of 35,000 copies.

== Track listings ==
- Australian CD single
1. "Hell No!"
2. "Hell No!" (instrumental)
3. "Over the Rainbow"
- Australian remix CD
1. "Hell No!" (Cabin Crew remix radio edit)
2. "Hell No!" featuring Israel Cruz (Elite Fleet remix)
3. "Hell No!" featuring Sean Ray (Aztryx remix)
4. "Hell No!" (Musik1 remix)
5. "Hell No!" (Cabin Crew extended club remix) – 6:28
6. "Hell No!" (original version)
7. "Hell No!" (acapella—lead vocal)
8. "Hell No!" (acapella—backing vocals)

== Credits and personnel ==
Credits are adapted from the liner notes of Ricki-Lee: The Singles.

Locations

- Mixed at Sing Sing Studios
- Mastered at Crystal Mastering

Personnel

- Audius – writing (as Audius Mtawarira), production, mixing
- Andy Love – writing
- Cheryline Lim – writing
- Andy Baldwin – mixing
- John Ruberto – mastering

== Charts ==
=== Weekly chart ===
| Chart (2005) | Peak position |
|---|---|
| Australia (ARIA) | 5 |

=== Year-end charts ===
| Chart (2005) | Rank |
|---|---|
| Australia (ARIA) | 75 |
| Australian Artists (ARIA) | 16 |

== Certification ==
| Region | Certification | Certified units/sales |
|---|---|---|
| Australia (ARIA) | Gold | 35,000^{^} |
^{^} Shipments figures based on certification alone.
