= Do It Like That (Ricki-Lee song) =

2012 single by Ricki-Lee Coulter

Single by Ricki-Lee Coulter

from the album Fear & Freedom
- B-side: "Left to Right"
- Released: 23 March 2012
- Genre: Pop
- Length: 2:47
- Label: EMI
- Songwriters: Ricki-Lee Coulter; Brian Kierulf; Josh Schwartz
- Producers: KNS Productions; Scott Horscroft; Eric J Dubowsky

Ricki-Lee Coulter singles chronology
"Raining Diamonds" (2011)	"Do It Like That" (2012)	"Crazy" (2012)

Music video
- "Do It Like That" on YouTube

"Do It Like That" is a song by Australian recording artist Ricki-Lee Coulter. "Do It Like that" was released for digital download on 23 March 2012, as the second single from Coulter's third studio album Fear & Freedom (2012). She stated that the song is about "having fun and it's about dancing". "Do It Like That" earned Coulter her first ARIA Music Award nomination for Song of the Year.

In Australia, the song peaked at number 13 on the ARIA Singles Chart and number one on the ARIA Dance Chart. Internationally, it reached number seven on the Japan Hot 100 chart. "Do It Like That" was certified platinum by the Australian Recording Industry Association for selling over 70,000 copies. The accompanying music video was directed by Emma Tomelty and features Coulter and her dancers performing choreographed routines. Both the song and video received comparisons to American singer Beyoncé. Coulter performed "Do It Like That" on Young Talent Time and Sunrise.

== Background and release ==
"Do It Like That" was written by Ricki-Lee Coulter, Brian Kierulf and Josh Schwartz. It was produced by Kierulf and Schwartz under their production name KNS Productions, who previously worked on Coulter's 2007 single "Can't Touch It", with additional production by Scott Horscroft and Eric J Dubowsky. Coulter stated that the song is "about having fun and it's about dancing ... there's nothing better to watch than massive groups of people all dancing together and having fun ... you can't help but smile and dance along in your chair". Before its release, the Fred Falke remix of "Do It Like That" debuted online on 16 March 2012. The official track was then released digitally on 23 March 2012. A digital EP, featuring four remixes of the song, was released on 4 May 2012. "Do It Like That" was released digitally in Japan on 28 November 2012. A digital EP was later released in Japan on 12 December 2012; it features a B-side track titled "Left to Right", a remix of "Do It Like That" and the music video.

== Reception ==
Nova FM called "Do It Like That" a "sexy" track, while Andrew Tijs of Noise11 described it as a "perky Beyoncé-esque song." Take 40 Australia viewed the song as "upbeat and exciting." "Do It Like That" earned Coulter her first ARIA Music Award nomination for Song of the Year. On 2 April 2012, "Do It Like That" debuted at number 69 on the ARIA Singles Chart and number 14 on the ARIA Dance Chart. It peaked at number 13 on the ARIA Singles Chart on 21 May 2012. The song eventually reached number one on the ARIA Dance Chart, where it remained for four non-consecutive weeks. "Do It Like That" was certified platinum by the Australian Recording Industry Association for selling over 70,000 copies. In the issue dated 26 January 2013, the song debuted and peaked at number seven on the Japan Hot 100 chart.

== Promotion ==
On 4 May 2012, Coulter performed "Do It Like That" on the Australian talent show, Young Talent Time. She was accompanied by the show's performing team who were her back-up dancers for the performance. Coulter later performed the song on the breakfast television program Sunrise on 25 May 2012. In April–May 2014, Coulter was the supporting act for Jason Derulo's Australian leg of his Tattoos World Tour, where she performed "Do It Like That" as part of her set list.

=== Music video ===
The music video was directed by Emma Tomelty and filmed in March 2012 at the Sydney Technology Park in Sydney, New South Wales. A behind-the-scenes video of the shoot was posted online on 22 March 2012. A preview of the official video clip was shown on Sunrise on 2 April 2012, and the full video premiered online later that day. Ninemsn's MusicFix commented that the video "is certainly eye-catching, partly because it's packed with fluoro-bright colours and perfectly-timed dance routines, but also because the Aussie pop darling has no pants on". Take 40 Australia compared the dance routines in the video to Beyoncé's "Crazy in Love" music video.

The video begins with Coulter and her dancers walking down a street parade, while several men are shown playing drums to the song. Coulter is wearing a black top, white jacket, underpants and Adidas sneakers. She performs choreographed routines with her dancers, while being surrounded by people who are dressed in bright colours and holding up balloons and flags. The video then cuts to Coulter singing in front of a brick backdrop, wearing a bright yellow top and colourful skirt. It then returns to Coulter and her dancers at the street parade, this time performing on a stage. Towards the end of the video, Coulter and her dancers are dressed in black and performing inside a dance studio in front of a large pink "Ricki-Lee" sign.

== Track listing ==
- Digital download
1. "Do It Like That" – 2:47
- Digital remix EP
1. "Do It Like That" – 2:47
2. "Do It Like That" (Fred Falke Remix Club Version) – 6:45
3. "Do It Like That" (Lenno Remix) – 4:00
4. "Do It Like That" (Protokol Club Edit) – 6:57
5. "Do It Like That" (Fear of Dawn Remix) – 5:12
- Japan digital EP
1. "Do It Like That" – 2:47
2. "Left to Right" – 3:52
3. "Do It Like That" (Fred Falke Remix Club Version) – 6:45
4. "Do It Like That" (Music video) – 2:48

== Credits and personnel ==
Credits adapted from the liner notes of Fear & Freedom.

Locations

- Mixed and engineered at Ninja Beat Club in Atlanta, Georgia.
- Mastered at Studios 301 in Sydney

Personnel

- Songwriting – Ricki-Lee Coulter, Brian Kierulf, Josh Schwartz
- Production – KNS Productions
- Additional production – Scott Horscroft, Eric J Dubowsky
- Mixing – Phil Tan
- Additional assistant engineering – Daniela Rivera
- Mastering – Sameer Sengupta

== Charts ==
=== Weekly charts ===
Chart (2012–2013)	Peak position
Australia (ARIA)	13
Australian Dance (ARIA)	1
Japan (Japan Hot 100)	7

=== Year-end charts ===
Chart (2012)	Rank
Australian Artists (ARIA)	14
Australian Dance (ARIA)	17

== Certifications ==
Region	Certification	Certified units/sales
Australia (ARIA)	Platinum	70,000^{^}
^{^} Shipments figures based on certification alone.

== Release history ==
Country	Date	Format	Label
Australia	23 March 2012	Digital download	EMI Music Australia
Australia	4 May 2012	Digital remix EP	EMI Music Australia
Japan	28 November 2012	Digital download	EMI Music Japan
Japan	12 December 2012	Digital EP	EMI Music Japan
