= Hear No, See No, Speak No =

2009 single by Ricki-Lee

Single by Ricki-Lee Coulter

from the album Hear No, See No, Speak No (unreleased)
- Released: 23 October 2009
- Genre: Electropop; dance
- Length: 3:57
- Label: Shock
- Songwriters: Ricki-Lee Coulter; David Gamson; Marc Nelkin; Alexander James

Ricki-Lee Coulter singles chronology
"Don't Miss You" (2009)	"Hear No, See No, Speak No" (2009)	"Raining Diamonds" (2011)

"Hear No, See No, Speak No" is a song performed by Australia singer-songwriter Ricki-Lee Coulter. Co-written by Coulter, David Gamson and Marc Nelkin, it was initially released as the second single from the singer's unreleased third studio album also titled, Hear No, See No, Speak No on 23 October 2009.

== Background ==
"Hear No, See No, Speak No" was the first song Coulter wrote in Los Angeles, and says it was her own cheeky take on the "hear no evil, see no evil, speak no evil" proverb. She said of the song, "It’s about getting to the point of strength in yourself where you just don’t want to hear someone’s voice. You no longer want to see their face or see the same situations reoccurring. And you no longer want to talk it out anymore." Coulter describes the song as "strong", "fierce", "intense" and "sexy" and explores more of the direction of taking back control. "Hear No, See No, Speak No" was sent to Australian radios on 5 October 2009.

== Music video ==
The music video for "Hear No, See No, Speak No" was shot at the old Ritz Carlton Hotel in Sydney. The video features a cameo appearance from former Gold Coast Titans rugby league player Daniel Conn. In the video Coulter is wearing a dominatrix leather and fishnet ensemble, holding a whip. She breaks into her ex-husband's hotel and ties him up and proceeds to intimidate him with a riding crop. It premiered on Video Hits on 10 October 2009.

== Track listing ==
- Digital EP
1. "Hear No, See No, Speak No" (Radio Edit) – 3:57
2. "Hear No, See No, Speak No" (Instrumental) – 3:57
3. "Hear No, See No, Speak No" (Karaoke Version) – 3:57
4. "Hear No, See No, Speak No" (Acappella) – 3:40

== Charts ==
Chart (2009)	Peak position
Australia (ARIA)	46

== Release history ==
Region	Date	Format	Label	Ref.
Australia	23 October 2009	Digital download	Shock	
Australia	4 December 2009	CD	Shock	
