= On My Own (Ricki-Lee song) =

2023 song by Ricki-Lee Coulter

Single by Ricki-Lee Coulter

from the album On My Own
- Released: 31 March 2023
- Genre: Pop
- Length: 3:05
- Label: Black Label Entertainment
- Songwriters: Ricki-Lee Coulter; Anthony Egizii; David Musumeci
- Producer: DNA Songs

Ricki-Lee Coulter singles chronology
"Last Night" (2020)	"On My Own" (2023)	"Point of No Return" (2023)

Music video
- "On My Own" on YouTube

"On My Own" is a song recorded by Australian singer and songwriter Ricki-Lee Coulter. It was written by Coulter and Australian production duo DNA Songs, and was released in March 2023 as the lead single from her fifth studio album On My Own (2024).

== Background ==
Prior to the release of "On My Own", Coulter's last music release was three years prior with "Last Night" (2020), and had since dedicated her career to television, hosting the tenth season of Australia's Got Talent in 2022 and the eighth season of Australian Idol in early 2023.

Upon announcing the release of "On My Own", Coulter described the song as "the song of my life. If this is the last song I ever put out I can hang my hat up and say 'OK, I'm happy'. It's everything I've ever wanted to say in a song", further explaining "what I love about this song is that it's a bit left-field, it's not what people are expecting from me. My favourite lyric in the whole song is 'I found sparks in the darkest places so watch me start a fire in the rain'. No matter what I've been through, even in the most difficult and challenging times when everything was against me, and people doubted me or said I couldn't... I did. I figured it out, I found a way, I made it happen and I did what nobody expected. That goes for everything in my life. That line represents my entire personality."

== Track listing ==
Digital download
No.	Title	Length
1.	"On My Own"	3:05

Digital download
No.	Title	Length
1.	"On My Own" (Jolyon Petch remix)	2:23

== Charts ==
Chart performance for "On My Own"
Chart (2023)	Peak position
Australia Independent (AIR)	1

== Release history ==
Release history for "On My Own"
Country	Date	Format	Label
Australia	31 March 2023	Digital download; streaming	Black Label Entertainment
