= On My Own (Ricki-Lee album) =

Studio album by Ricki-Lee Coulter
- Released: 8 March 2024
- Length: 30:48
- Label: Black Label
- Producers: Ricki-Lee Coulter; DNA

Ricki-Lee Coulter chronology
| Dance in the Rain (2014) | On My Own (2024) |

Singles from On My Own
- 1. "On My Own" Released: 31 March 2023; 2. "Point of No Return" Released: 21 July 2023; 3. "Ghost" Released: 9 November 2023; 4. "I Was Made for Loving You" Released: 1 March 2024

On My Own is the fifth studio album by Australian singer and songwriter Ricki-Lee Coulter, released on 8 March 2024. The album was announced on 9 November 2023. The album is the first released on Coulter's own Black Label and is the first time she has been co-producer.

Upon announcement Coulter said, "Over the last 18 months, I have poured my absolute everything into this album, and without a doubt, it's my best work to date."

Producers Anthony Egizii and David Musumeci of DNA said they were "impressed" by Coulter, saying "These studio sessions have really reminded us that she's one of Australia's best artists and singers by far. She just gets the craft and always aims so high. Ricki-Lee has one of the best voices of our generation and I can't wait for the world to hear what we've created together."

== Singles ==
"On My Own" was released on 31 March 2023 as the album's lead single. The music video for "On My Own" was filmed on a glacier in Queenstown, New Zealand. In an interview with The Music in May 2023, Coulter said, "As soon as I wrote "On My Own" it was really clear that that was the one that had to launch everything because the song is so epic and amazing, but also because I'm doing it on my own, we're putting it out ourselves and it's a whole new thing." The song didn't enter the ARIA top 100, but debuted at number 1 on the Australian Independent Music Charts.

"Point of No Return" was released on 21 July 2023. The day before its release, Coulter spoke on Sunrise saying "This is absolutely a love song about falling in love with my beautiful husband, but for me, there is a second meaning. For me, there is a rush that you get when you make massive decisions in your life and you follow something through and you decide, 'I'm doing this and there's no turning back'. There's a real freedom in that." The music video was released on 3 August 2023. The song didn't enter the ARIA top 100, but peaked at number 2 on the Australian Independent Music Charts.

"Ghost" was released on 10 November 2023 as the album's third single. Coulter said, "I wrote the song about being ghosted. We've all been there, and it's such a weird and frustrating thing to go through because you never really get any closure." The music video was released on 3 December 2023. The song didn't enter the ARIA top 100, but debuted at number 1 on the Australian Independent Music Charts.

"I Was Made for Loving You" was released on 1 March 2024 as the album's fourth single. The song incorporates elements of the Kiss song of the same name.

== Critical reception ==
Professional ratings
Review scores
| Source | Rating |
|---|---|
| The AU Review | 4/5 stars |
| Rolling Stone Australia | 3/5 stars |

Peter Gray from The AU Review said "An album booming with positivity, self-empowerment and shameless abandon, On My Own, despite sticking to a formula, deserves to be celebrated, for not only being a cohesive album that defies the notion that pop is a 'dirty word', but for what it represents for the tenacious singer, savvy businesswoman, and accessible personality behind it."

Poppy Reid from Rolling Stone Australia said "Known for her tone and shading, Ricki-Lee has undoubtedly created a dance floor filler collection, but kept the avenging angel vocals she's honed over her two decade-long career."

== Track listing ==
All tracks are written by Ricki-Lee Coulter, Anthony Egizii, and David Musumeci, except where noted.

On My Own track listing
| No. | Title | Length |
|---|---|---|
| 1. | "On My Own" | 3:05 |
| 2. | "Point of No Return" (Coulter, Egizii, Musumeci, David Schuler) | 3:07 |
| 3. | "I Was Made for Loving You" (Desmond Child, Vincent Poncia, Paul Stanley) | 3:29 |
| 4. | "Magic" | 3:06 |
| 5. | "Dance Like Nobody's Watching" | 3:00 |
| 6. | "Real Love" (Coulter, Egizii, Musumeci, Ivy Adara) | 3:11 |
| 7. | "More Than Love" | 3:07 |
| 8. | "Talkin'" | 2:38 |
| 9. | "Ghost" | 3:07 |
| 10. | "What Do You Want from Me?" | 2:58 |
| Total length: | | 30:48 |

== Personnel ==
- Ricki-Lee Coulter – lead vocals
- DNA – production
- Leon Zervos – mastering
- David Schuler – co-production on "Point of No Return"

== Charts ==
Chart performance for On My Own
| Chart (2024) | Peak position |
|---|---|
| Australian Albums (ARIA) | 3 |
