= Don't Miss You (Ricki-Lee song) =

2009 single by Ricki-Lee Coulter

Single by Ricki-Lee Coulter

from the album Hear No, See No, Speak No (unreleased)
- Released: 3 August 2009
- Genre: Electropop; pop
- Length: 3:10
- Label: Shock
- Songwriters: Ricki-Lee Coulter; Nikki Gregroff; Paul Weinber
- Producers: Nikki Gregroff; Paul Weinber

Ricki-Lee Coulter singles chronology
"Wiggle It" (2008)	"Don't Miss You" (2009)	"Hear No, See No, Speak No" (2009)

"Don't Miss You" is a song by Australian singer-songwriter Ricki-Lee Coulter. Co-written by Coulter, Nikki Gregoff and Paul Weinber the song was initially released as the lead single from her unreleased third studio album, Hear No, See No, Speak No. It was released both physically and digitally on 3 August 2009.

== Background ==
"Don't Miss You" is a breakup anthem that Coulter says expresses her feelings about her ex-husband, Jamie Babbington. It is the first song Coulter wrote in New York City. She explained, "Well you’ve got to put yourself in my position where I was in a relationship for seven years, the only relationship I’d ever known and obviously you don’t write a song with lyrics like that if everything was happy as. It was very painful and humiliating going through the breakup in front of the whole country. For me, that song is not about being bitter or anything. That song is about representing me turning the corner and finding my feet again."

While Coulter's previous singles have been infused with a distinctly R&B flavour, "Don't Miss You" incorporates a blend of pop, rock and dance. She explained, "It’s a sound that just naturally developed while I was overseas. The stuff I was writing really lent itself to this fusion of pop and rock and electro and I think it suits my voice."

== Release and promotion ==
"Don't Miss You" was initially released as the first single from Coulter's then-upcoming third studio album, originally titled Hear No, See No, Speak No. However, after "Don't Miss You" and its follow-up single, the album's title track, both struggled on the charts, she told her record label Shock Records to cancel the album's release. In a 2011 interview with the Herald Sun, Coulter revealed that she did not want to release "Don't Miss You" as a single, but the decision was out of her hands, as Shock Records and her management at the time had already started picking the singles for the album. In a 2014 interview with Moustache magazine, Coulter was asked if she regretted any songs, to which she replied: "'Don't Miss You'! That song was a joke...I wrote it as a joke and I never wanted it to see the light of day...it's awful. But my old record label and ex manager strong armed me into releasing it and I just wish it never existed."

Following the physical release of "Don't Miss You", Coulter held instore appearances at Westfield Shopping Centres in Victoria, New South Wales, Western Australia, South Australia and Queensland.

== Track listings ==
- CD single
1. "Don't Miss You" (radio edit) – 3:10
2. "Don't Miss You" (a cappella) – 2:56
3. "Don't Miss You" (instrumental) – 3:07
- Digital EP
1. "Don't Miss You" (radio edit) – 3:10
2. "Don't Miss You" (a cappella) – 2:56
3. "Don't Miss You" (instrumental) – 3:07
4. "Don't Miss You" (Sammy J remix) – 4:27

== Chart performance ==
"Don't Miss You" debuted at number 36 on the ARIA Singles Chart and peaked at number 24 in its fifth week on the chart. It also debuted on the AIR Singles Chart at number one.

=== Weekly charts ===
Chart (2009)	Peak position
Australia (ARIA)	24
Australia (AIR)	1

=== Year-end chart ===
Chart (2009)	Rank
Australian Artists (ARIA)	40

== Release history ==
Region	Date	Format(s)	Label	Ref.
Australia	3 August 2009	CD; digital download	Shock	
