= Pocket 808 =

Pocket 808 are a dance music duo from Sydney. Previous named PoxyMusic, the duo is composed of Sameer Sengupta and Ken Cloud. Their music is a mix of dub, rock and hip hop and they feature guest vocalists on their tracks. Singers have included Phil Jamieson and Nathan Hudson.

Their 2003 reworking of "La La Land by Green Velvet", in collaboration with Kid Kenobi, won Best Remix at 2003's Australian Dance Music Awards.

As PoxyMusic they received a nomination for Best Dance Release at the ARIA Music Awards of 2007 for "She Bites", which features vocals from Nicole Lombardi of the musical group Spalding Rockwell.

== Discography ==
=== Albums ===
Title	Album details
Pocket 808
Proximo	Released: August 2010; Label: Hussle Recordings (HUSSYCD047); Formats: CD, Digital

=== Singles ===
Title	Year	Peak chart positions
Title	Year	AUS
as poxyMusic
"Our Break"	2005	—
"She Bites" (featuring Nicole Lombardi)	2007	—
"War Paint" (featuring Gina Mitchell)	2008	—
as Pocket 808
"Ghostship" (featuring Nathan Hudson)	2009	—
"Monster (Babe)"	2010	—

== Awards and nominations ==
=== ARIA Music Awards ===
The ARIA Music Awards is an annual awards ceremony that recognises excellence, innovation, and achievement across all genres of Australian music.

Year	Nominee / work	Award	Result
2007	"She Bites"	Best Dance Release	Nominated
