= Dihydroxycoumarin =

Dihydroxycoumarin may refer to:

- Aesculetin (6,7-dihydroxycoumarin)
- Daphnetin (7,8-dihydroxycoumarin)
