= Aesculin =

Names
- IUPAC name 6-(β-D-Glucopyranosyloxy)-7-hydroxy-2H-1-benzopyran-2-one
- Systematic IUPAC name 7-Hydroxy-6-{[(2S,3R,4S,5S,6R)-3,4,5-trihydroxy-6-(hydroxymethyl)oxan-2-yl]oxy}-2H-1-benzopyran-2-one
- Other names: Æsculin; Esculin; Esculetin 6-β-D-glucoside; 6,7-Dihydroxycoumarin 6-β-D-glucoside; 6,7-Dihydroxychromen-2-one 6-β-D-glucoside

Identifiers
CAS Number	531-75-9
3D model (JSmol)	Interactive image
ChEBI	CHEBI:4853
ChEMBL	ChEMBL482581
ChemSpider	4444765
DrugBank	DB13155
ECHA InfoCard	100.007.744
EC Number	208-517-5
KEGG	C09264
PubChem CID	5281417
UNII	1Y1L18LQAF
CompTox Dashboard (EPA)	DTXSID7045318
- InChI: InChI=1S/C15H16O9/c16-5-10-12(19)13(20)14(21)15(24-10)23-9-3-6-1-2-11(18)22-8(6)4-7(9)17/h1-4,10,12-17,19-21H,5H2/t10-,12-,13+,14-,15-/m1/s1 Key: XHCADAYNFIFUHF-TVKJYDDYSA-N; InChI=1/C15H16O9/c16-5-10-12(19)13(20)14(21)15(24-10)23-9-3-6-1-2-11(18)22-8(6)4-7(9)17/h1-4,10,12-17,19-21H,5H2/t10-,12-,13+,14-,15-/m1/s1 Key: XHCADAYNFIFUHF-TVKJYDDYBL
- SMILES: O=C/3Oc2c(cc(O[C@@H]1O[C@@H]([C@@H](O)[C@H](O)[C@H]1O)CO)c(O)c2)\C=C\3

Properties
Chemical formula	C_{15}H_{16}O_{9}
Molar mass	340.284 g·mol^{−1}
- Except where otherwise noted, data are given for materials in their standard state (at 25 °C [77 °F], 100 kPa). verify (what is ?) Infobox references

Aesculin, also called æsculin or esculin, is a coumarin glucoside that naturally occurs in the trees horse chestnut (Aesculus hippocastanum), California buckeye (Aesculus californica), and prickly box (Bursaria spinosa). It is also found in daphnin (the dark green resin of Daphne mezereum), dandelion coffee, and olive bark. It is reported to be present in olive bark, but not in olive leaf; therefore, identification of aesculin in abundance in an olive extract indicates that the extract has been derived from olive bark.

== Uses ==
Aesculin is also used in a microbiology laboratory to aid in the identification of bacterial species (especially Enterococci and Listeria). In fact, all strains of Group D Streptococci hydrolyze aesculin in 40% bile.

== Aesculin hydrolysis test ==
Aesculin is incorporated into agar with ferric citrate and bile salts (bile aesculin agar). Hydrolysis of aesculin forms aesculetin (6,7-dihydroxycoumarin) and glucose. Aesculetin forms dark brown or black complexes with ferric citrate, allowing the test to be read.

The bile aesculin agar is streaked and incubated at 37 °C (99 °F) for 24 hours. The presence of a dark brown or black halo indicates that the test is positive. A positive test can occur with Enterococcus, Aerococcus, and Leuconostoc. Aesculin will fluoresce under long wave ultraviolet light (360 nm) and hydrolysis of aesculin results in loss of this fluorescence.

Enterococcus will often flag positive within four hours of the agar being inoculated.

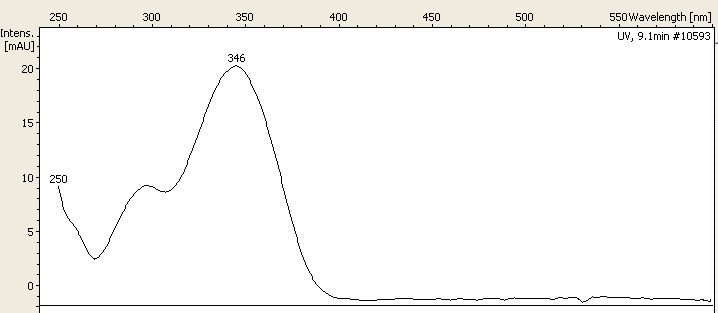
UV visible spectrum of aesculin with a maximum of absorbance at 346 nm

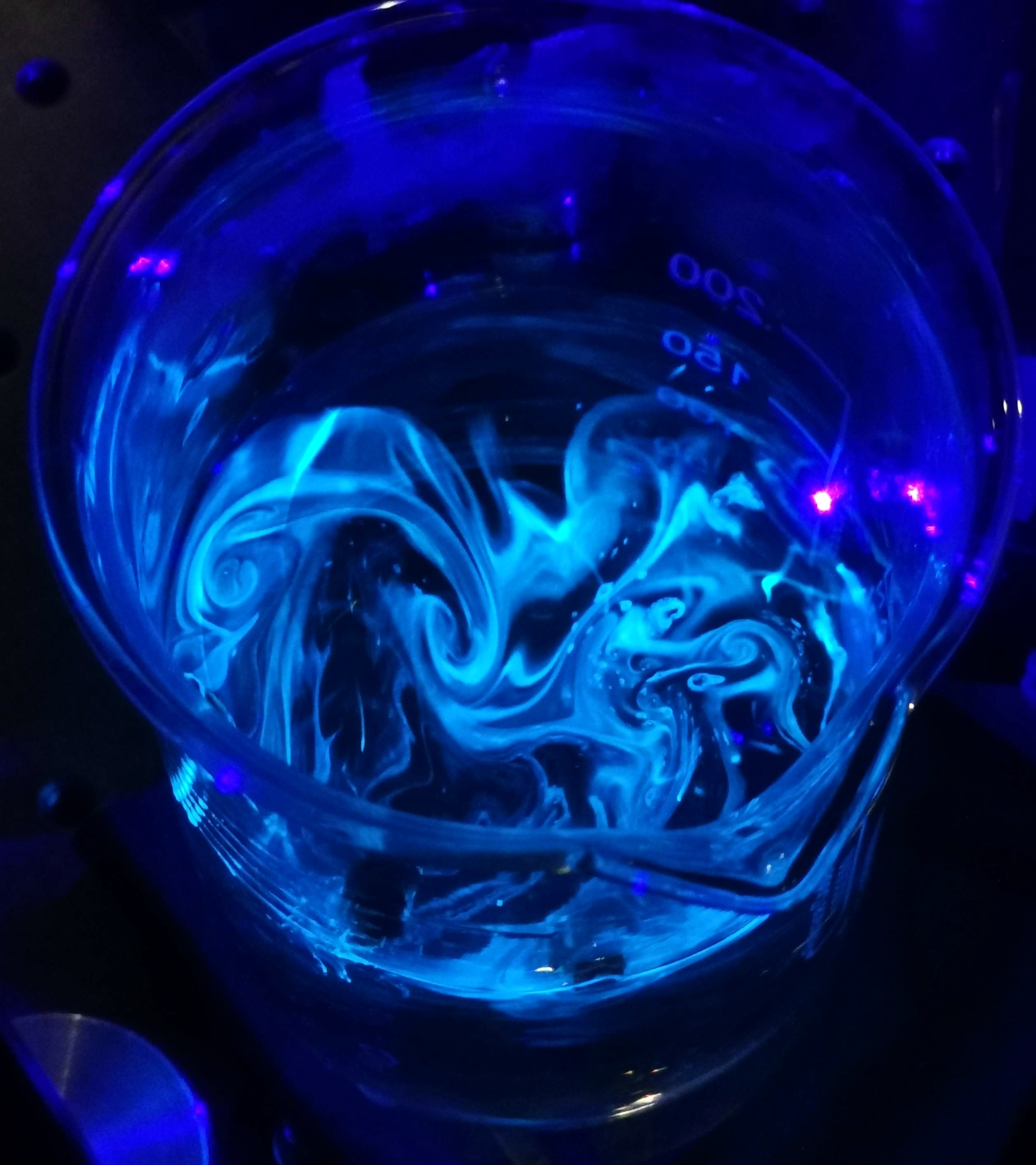
Fluorescence of esculin, disolving in water from chestnut tree bark, at 403 nm.
