= Bile esculin agar =

Selective and differential culture medium

Esculin

Bile Esculin Agar (BEA) is a selective differential agar used to isolate and identify members of the genus Enterococcus, formerly part of the "group D streptococci" (enterococci were reclassified in their own genus in 1984).

== Composition and process ==
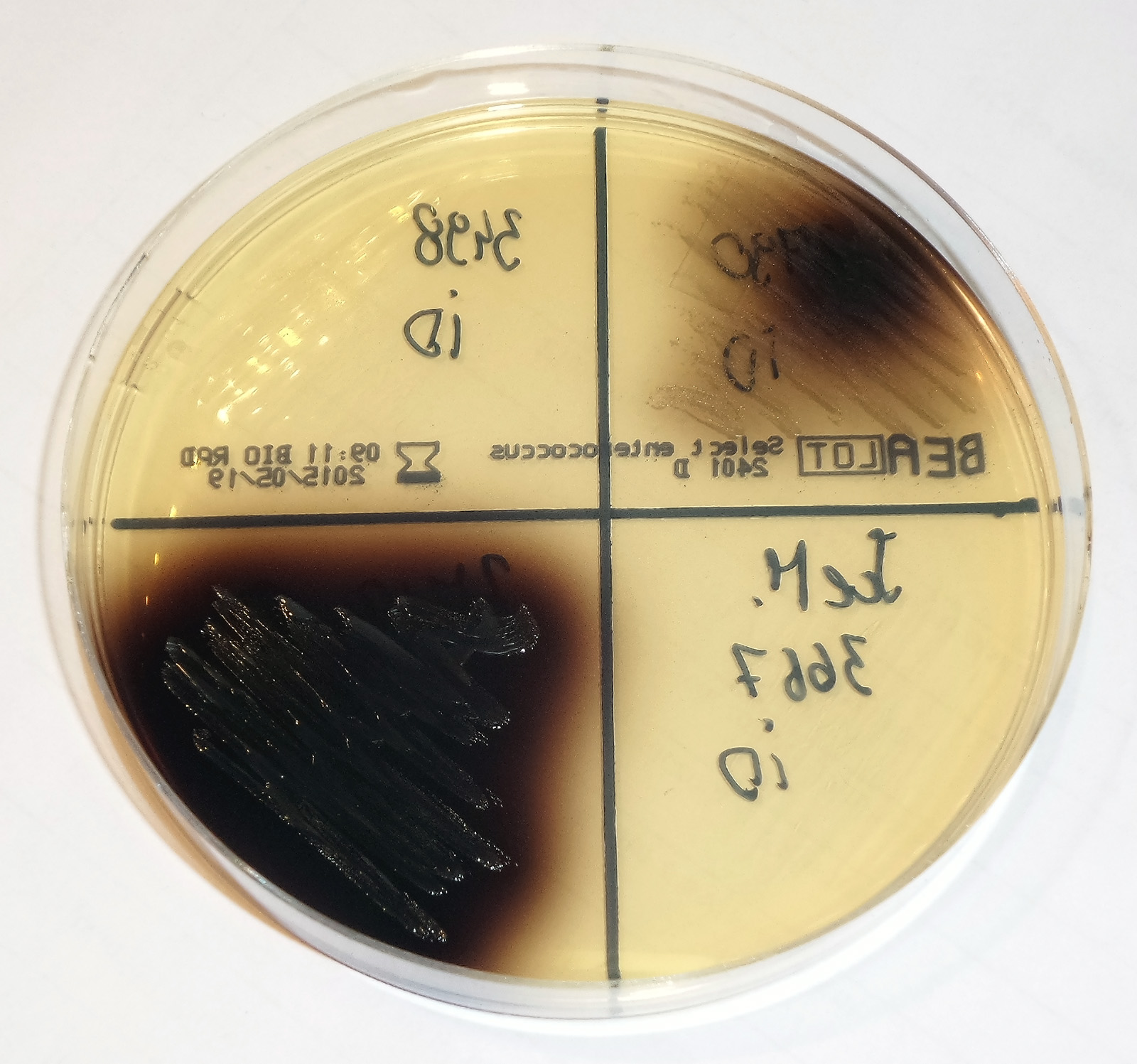
Enterococcus colonies (black) growing on BEA

Bile salts are the selective ingredient, while esculin is the differential component. Enterococcus hydrolyze esculin to products that react with ferric citrate in the medium to produce insoluble iron salts, resulting in the blackening of the medium.

Test results must be interpreted in conjunction with gram stain morphology.

== Uses ==
Bile Esculin Agar is used primarily to differentiate Enterococcus from Streptococcus. Members of the genus Enterococcus are capable of growing in the presence of 40% bile (oxgall) and hydrolyzing esculin to glucose and esculetin. Esculetin combines with ferric ions to produce a black complex.

For some purposes, certain bacteria are able to hydrolyze aesculin. A plate containing aesculin will fluoresce a pale blue under UV radiation. Some bacteria can hydrolyze this, leading to UV dark colonies, as opposed to UV light ones.

When new techniques are produced to identify enterococci, they are often compared to the use of bile esculin agar.
