= Daphnin =

Names
- IUPAC name 7-(β-D-Glucopyranosyloxy)-8-hydroxy-2H-1-benzopyran-2-one
- Preferred IUPAC name 8-Hydroxy-7-{[(2S,3R,4S,5S,6R)-3,4,5-trihydroxy-6-(hydroxymethyl)oxan-2-yl]oxy}-2H-1-benzopyran-2-one
- Other names Daphnoside; 7-(β-D-Glucopyranosyloxy)-8-hydroxycoumarin; Daphnetin 7-β-D-glucopyranoside

Identifiers
CAS Number	486-55-5
3D model (JSmol)	Interactive image
ChEBI	CHEBI:17989
ChEMBL	ChEMBL1879316
ChemSpider	16735762
KEGG	C01421
PubChem CID	439499
UNII	K4REW3G17G
CompTox Dashboard (EPA)	DTXSID80197563
- InChI: InChI=1S/C15H16O9/c16-5-8-10(18)12(20)13(21)15(23-8)22-7-3-1-6-2-4-9(17)24-14(6)11(7)19/h1-4,8,10,12-13,15-16,18-21H,5H2/t8-,10-,12+,13-,15-/m1/s1 Key: HOIXTKAYCMNVMY-PVOAASPHSA-N
- SMILES: O=C2\C=C/c3ccc(O[C@@H]1O[C@H](CO)[C@@H](O)[C@H](O)[C@H]1O)c(O)c3O2

Properties
Chemical formula	C_{15}H_{16}O_{9}
Molar mass	340.284 g·mol^{−1}
- Except where otherwise noted, data are given for materials in their standard state (at 25 °C [77 °F], 100 kPa). Infobox references

Daphnin is a plant toxin with the chemical formula C_{15}H_{16}O_{9} and is one of the active compounds present in the Eurasian and North African genus Daphne of the Thymelaeaceae, a plant family with a predominantly Southern Hemisphere distribution with concentrations in Australia and tropical Africa.

== Origin ==
Daphne mezereum (sometimes called mezereon) is a plant native to Europe and western Asia and is a member of the family Thymelaeaceae. The plants have different bioactive metabolites and pharmacological active molecules like anti-inflammatory, anti-cruor effects, reduction of blood coagulation, and the increase of uric acid excretion. However, the plant's berries and twigs contain daphnin, mezerein (damages the kidneys), and daphne toxin (heavy fevers and even causing death), which are toxic to humans and some animals. Daphnin is a hydroxycoumarin compound. Coumarins are a family of benzopyrones widely distributed in nature.

== Biosynthesis and isolation ==
Daphnetin is a dihydroxy coumarin and can undergo enzymatic glycosylation to yield its 7-O-glucoside, called daphnin. The reaction is catalyzed by the enzyme O-dihydroxycoumarin 7-O-glucosyltransferase. The glucose unit is transferred from UDP-glucose, with uridine diphosphate (UDP) as byproduct.

daphnetin
+ UDP-glucose
UDP
daphnin

In Daphne odora, and possibly other Daphne species, daphnin is formed from p-glucosyl oxycinnamic acid. The formed daphnin can be converted to 8-glucoside by the enzyme transglucosidase using hydrolysis and glycosidation. The formed 8-glucoside is energetically more stable than the 7-glucoside daphnin.

Daphnin and its precursor daphnetin have also been found in Matricaria chamomilla, also known as chamomile.

Publications show different approaches for isolating daphnin, most of which focus on making an extract of Daphne mezereum followed by affinity separation. Extraction is done by using absolute ethanol, methanol, and chloroform in a mixture at different concentrations, and are often used as eluting systems for the separation procedure on silica gel columns and as mobile phases for the TLCs. Multiple fractions are taken and identified by NMR and/or mass spectroscopy.

== Reactions and metabolism ==
=== Hypouricemia effect ===
Serum uric acid levels in organisms need to be at a certain level. A high concentration causes hyperuricemia, and causes gout or in some cases kidney stones.

In vitro experiments with the reaction of dapnin and serum uric acid, inhibited by potassium oxonate, cause an increase in the hyperuricemic levels in mice for several hours, after which the level decreases. The dose-dependent concentration of daphnin is 100 mg/kg for mice. However, the dose-dependent concentration for humans is not known.

Human serum albumin

Most substances in the body are transported by a protein transport in the plasma. The most common transporter is the Human serum albumin (HSA) which transports endogenous molecules for ADME. The interaction between HSA and Dapnin can occur under physiological conditions in vitro. The binding can be measured by fluorescence quenching or by the tryptophan residue on the HSA.

The binding between Daphnin and HSA changes the microenvironment of the tryptophan residue with a λmax of 215 nm for the Daphnin-HSA complex and a λmax of 314 nm for Daphnin.

Interconversion

Daphnin interconversion is one of the metabolic pathways that can take place. With this metabolic pathway, the Daphnin can be converted into daphnetin by hydrolysis caused by the enzyme transglycosylase, releasing D-glucopyranose which has a major role in human metabolism. Daphnetin counteracted GSH depletion and inhibited MPO activity. Daphentin can also be metabolized back into Daphnin by the reaction with UDP-alpha-D-glucose.

== Biological activities ==
Despite the toxic effects of species in the Daphne genus, different useful bioactive and phytochemicals compounds are present in the berries.

The species of the Daphne genus have, despite the toxicity, also different bioactive effects: antioxidant, anti-inflammatory, cytotoxic, anti-ulcerogenic, absorptive, hypocholesterolemic, and hemostatic effects.

Like some other coumarins, daphnin also shows antimicrobial activity.

== Symptoms ==
Daphne mezereum is toxic because of the compounds daphnin, mezerein, and daphnetoxin which are partially present in the fruits and the twigs. When interacting with these parts of the plant gastrointestinal effects can occur which eventually can cause an experience of delirium, seizures, and death. Some people experience only skin rash or eczema.

Earlier publications in the Lancet have shown that there is a difference in symptoms present looking at the different ages of the person when taking the fruits orally. The symptoms that are the same in all cases, were the burns and digestive tract when taken orally. In young children (toddlers), the symptoms are mainly vomiting and hyper catharsis after taking one or two parts of the plant orally. When more parts are eaten it will mostly cause death.

Older children mostly experience vomiting when the fruits are taken orally, only the reaction of tympanitic distension of the abdomen will take place immediately.

For adults, only 12 or more berries are needed for a death cause. After oral intake, the body immediately starts vomiting. Furthermore, narcotism signs show up like small pupils, shallow breathing, unresponsiveness, sluggishness, and confusion.

== Toxicity ==
There is not much scientific evidence of the toxicity of daphnin. However, the sap, berries, and bark of all Daphne species are toxic to humans and small animals. The sap is also a skin irritant. It has a similar structure as coumarin, which is mildly toxic to humans. It can be assumed that a similar pathway is followed by the biodegradation of daphnin. Coumarin is toxic for the liver and kidney, so it is advised to pay attention.

== Effect on animals ==
Daphnin has the same toxicity for pets as for humans. Only birds have resistance against these toxic compounds, which have also a negative effect on humans and pets. Because of the nontoxicity for birds, they will spread the barriers and the twigs which leads to more spread of the plant.

== Medicinal application ==
=== Daphne plants ===
Despite the toxicity of the compound, daphnin has antibacterial activities in the low concentration rate of 200-250 μg/mL the minimum inhibitory concentrations (MIC) are defined as the lowest concentration of an antimicrobial that will inhibit the visible growth of a microorganism after overnight incubation.

Different species of the Thymelaeaceae family have been used for centuries in China as traditional medicine. The different parts of the plant are used for specific diseases. The toxic compounds of the Daphne mezereum. can specifically be used on P-388 lymphocytic cells for the antileukemic activities in mice. Especially mezerein can be isolated and inhibit the effect against P-388/L-1210 cells.

Leaves of Daphne odora have highly bioactive compounds which can be isolated, which then can be used to make medicine to relieve headache and to lower fever. Daphne oleoides subsp. oleoides' roots can help against diarrhea, the leaves help against skin damage and ulcers. Its herbs and leaves have been reported to be used as folk medicine against rheumatism and/or edema and to treat lumbago (respectively) in the Taurus Mountains, South Turkey. The flowers of Daphne genkwa is used as anti-inflammatory agent and anti-carcinogenic.

=== Daphnetin ===
Daphnetin shows several neuroprotective and anti-inflammatory effects on the inhibition of the TLR4/NF-kB mediated inflammatory signaling pathway. They also could inhibit the IKKs/IkBa/NF-kB, AKT, and the Src/FAK/ERK1/2 multi-target medication signaling pathway for anti-angiogenesis and cancer.

Daphnetin has been reported to be a strong sensitizer, which means that this compound and its glycosidic derivatives (e.g. daphnin) can be a cause of allergic reactions.
