= Niwaki =

Japanese word for "garden trees"

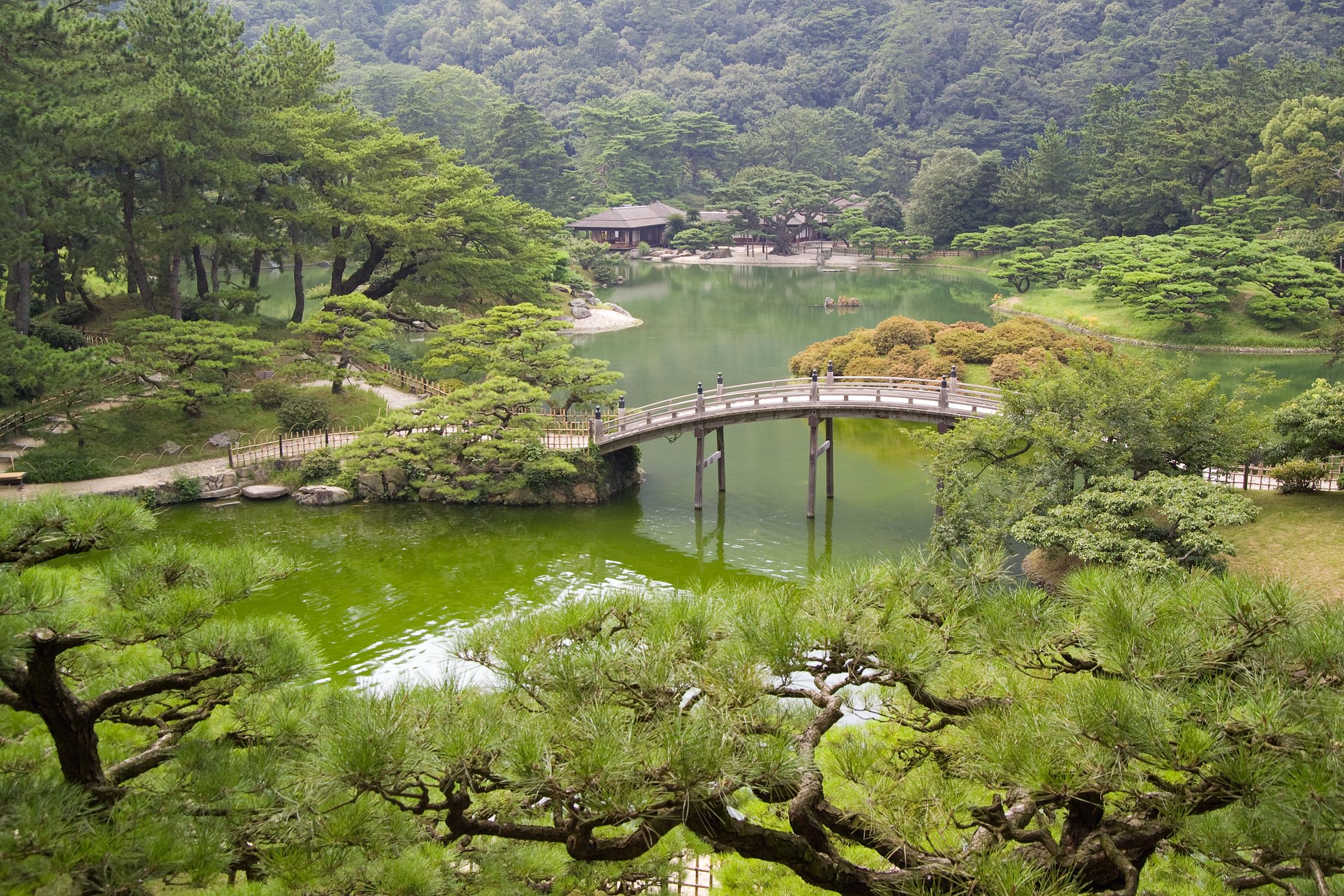
Niwaki trees at Ritsurin Garden

Niwaki (庭木) is the Japanese word for "garden trees". Niwaki is also a descriptive word for highly "sculpting trees".

Most varieties of plants used in Japanese gardens are called niwaki. These trees help to create the structure of the garden. Japanese gardens are not about using large range of plants, rather the objective is creating atmosphere or ambiance. The technique of niwaki is more about what to do with a tree than the tree itself. While Western gardeners enjoy experimenting with a wide range of different plants, Japanese gardeners achieve variety through training and shaping a relatively limited set of plants.

Trees play a key role in the gardens and landscapes of Japan as well as being of important spiritual and cultural significance to its people. Fittingly, Japanese gardeners have fine-tuned a distinctive set of pruning techniques meant to coax out the essential characters of niwaki. Niwaki are often cultivated to achieve some very striking effects: trees are made to look older than they really are with broad trunks and gnarled branches; trees are made to imitate wind-swept or lightning-struck trees in the wild; Cryptomeria japonica specimens are often pruned to resemble free-growing trees.

Some designers are using zoke (miscellaneous plants) as well as the niwaki to create a more "natural" mood to the landscape. Most traditional garden designers still rely primarily on the rarefied niwaki palette. The principles of niwaki may be applied to garden trees all over the world and are not restricted to Japanese gardens.

== Plant types ==
The plants used most commonly in Japanese gardens today include:

- Japanese black pine (Pinus thunbergii)
- Japanese cedar (Cryptomeria japonica)
- Camellias including sasanqua (Camellia sasanqua)
- Many other flowering varieties (Camellia japonica cvs)
- Japanese evergreen oaks (Quercus glauca, Quercus myrsinifolia)
- Gardenia (Gardenia jasminoides)
- Sweet osmanthus (Osmanthus fragrans)
- Japanese maple (Acer palmatum)
- Chinese plum (Prunus mume and others)
- Yoshino flowering cherry (Prunus × yedoensis 'Yoshino')
- Japanese aucuba (Aucuba japonica)
- Japanese andromeda (Pieris japonica)
- Winter daphne (Daphne odora)
- Japanese enkianthus (Enkianthus perulatus)
- Satsuki azalea (Rhododendron cvs.)
