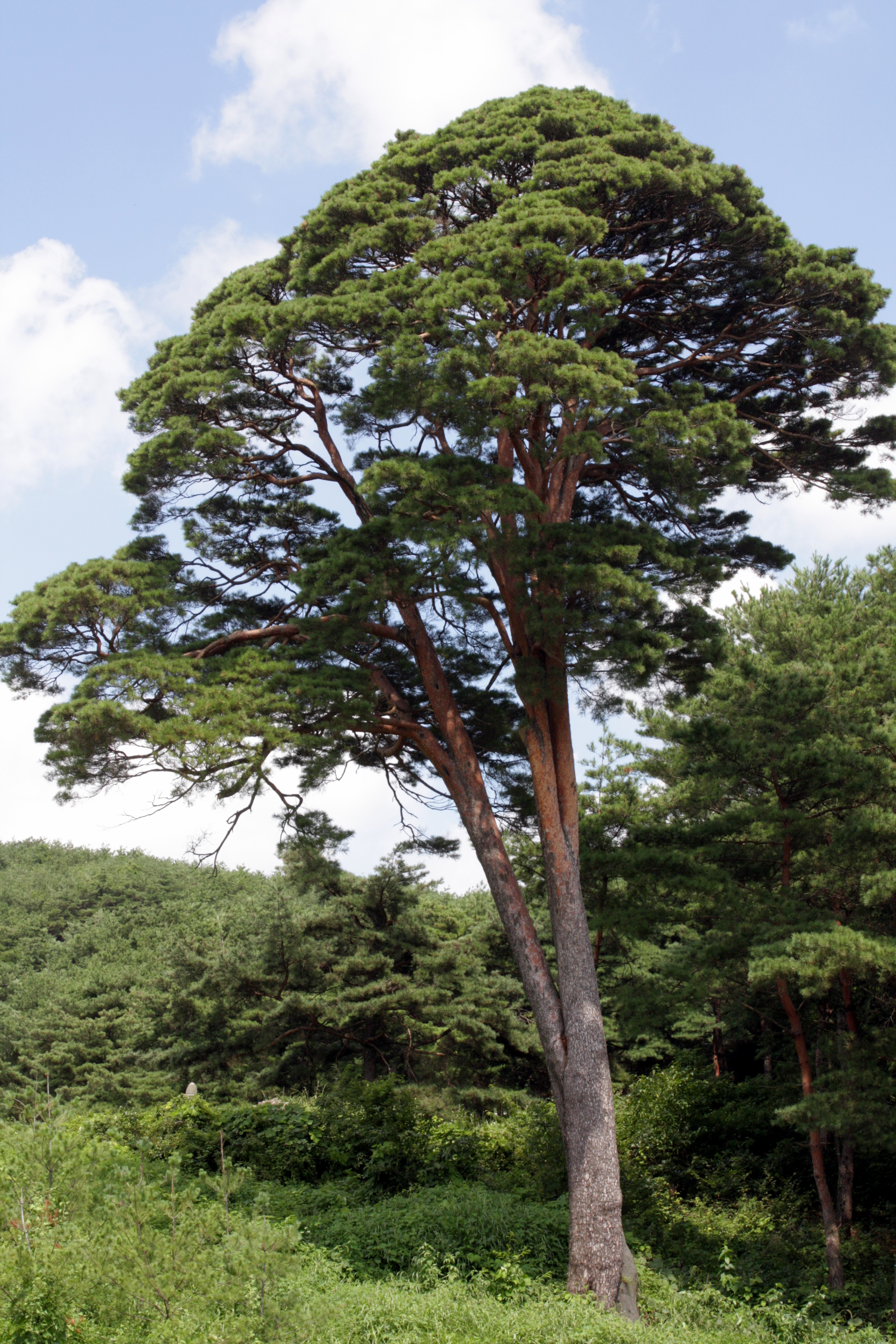
- Pinus densiflora in Damyang, Korea

Conservation status
- Least Concern (IUCN 3.1)

Scientific classification
- Kingdom: Plantae
- Clade: Tracheophytes
- Clade: Gymnosperms
- Division: Pinophyta
- Class: Pinopsida
- Order: Pinales
- Family: Pinaceae
- Genus: Pinus
- Subgenus: P. subg. Pinus
- Section: P. sect. Pinus
- Subsection: P. subsect. Pinus
- Species: P. densiflora

Binomial name
- Pinus densiflora Siebold & Zucc.

Synonyms
- Pinus funebris Kom.; Pinus japonica Forbes nom. illeg.; Pinus scopifera Miq.

= Pinus densiflora =

Species of conifer

Pinus densiflora, also called the Japanese red pine, the Japanese pine, or Korean red pine, is a species of pine, a conifer in the family Pinaceae native to East Asia and Siberia.

== Taxonomy ==
Pinus funebris Kom. is treated as a synonym of Pinus densiflora by some authors, but is considered to be a natural hybrid (Pinus × funebris) between Pinus densiflora and Pinus sylvestris by others, particularly within its native area, where the two species meet in southeastern Russia. Pinus × densithunbergii is a naturally occurring hybrid with Pinus thunbergii.

== Distribution and habitat ==
P. densiflora has a home range that includes Japan, the Korean peninsula, northeastern China (Heilongjiang, Jilin, Liaoning, Shandong and northeastern Jiangsu), and the extreme southeast of Russia (in Siberia, southern Primorsky Krai).

== Name ==
The tree is called "Akamatsu (アカマツ)" in Japanese. The etymology behind "Akamatsu" is a combination of "red" or "aka (赤/あか)", and "pine" or "matsu (松/まつ)". The meaning behind "aka" means "red", most likely alluding to the bark colour whereas "matsu" is believed to have derived from the word "to wait (待つ/matsu)" as the tree was believed to have "waited for the arrival of the gods (kami)" or "waited throughout winter".

In Korean, the tree is called "Sonamu (소나무)", meaning "So-tree". The meaning behind "so" is believed to be from "sol (솔)" an ancient word that means "pine", making "Sonamu/So-tree" mean "pine tree".

In China, the plant is known as "chì sōng (赤松)", sharing the characters and meaning of "red pine" with Japanese. It most likely adopted the name from the Japanese counterpart.

== Description ==
The leaves are needle-like, 8–12 centimetres (3–4 1/2 inches) long, with two per fascicle. The short leaves are 5–6 cm. There are stomatal lines on both sides of the leaf, two vascular bundles, about three to nine resin canals, and fine serrations on the edge of the leaf. Branchlets are covered with whitish powder. Male cones are light reddish yellow, clustered in the lower part of new branches. Female cones are light reddish purple and solitary or clustered into two to three cones. The cones are dark brown-yellow or light brown-yellow when mature and are dehiscent at maturity, with seed scales usually thin, and seeds winged. The bark is orange-red and cracked into irregular scale-like pieces. The heartwood is reddish-brown, and the sapwood light reddish-yellow. The height of the tree is 20–35 metres (66–115 feet). The crown can reach 30 metres (98 feet).

"The distribution of P. densiflora in China has the following pattern of variation: the more northward it is distributed, the needles are relatively shorter, the white powder on the branchlets is sometimes less obvious or partly obvious, and the colour of the cones is lighter. It is light brown yellow".

The cones are 4–7 cm (1 1/2–3 in) long. It is closely related to Scots pine, differing in the longer, slenderer leaves which are mid-green without the glaucous-blue tone of Scots pine. This pine has become a popular ornamental and has several cultivars, but in the winter it becomes yellowish. The plant prefers full sun on well-drained, slightly acidic soil.

== Uses ==
Strong wind resistance, P. densiflora is an excellent tree species for afforestation in stony mountains, barren soil and sandy land. The timber can be used for construction, electric poles, sleepers, ore pillars, furniture, and wood fibre industrial raw materials. The trunk is rich in resin, from which rosin and turpentine can be extracted. Essential oil can be extracted from the leaves. In northeast China, matsutake relies on P. densiflora for growth. "Jilin Tianfozhishan National Nature Reserve/Jilin Tianfozhishan National Nature Reserve" takes Matsutake, P. densiflora and ecosystem as the main protection objects. P. densiflora wood has natural anti-corrosion and anti-mildew properties, and natural preservatives and natural wood anti-mould agents can be extracted. P. densiflora has non-stinging needles and soft branches, making it easy to shape as a penjing.

== Gallery ==
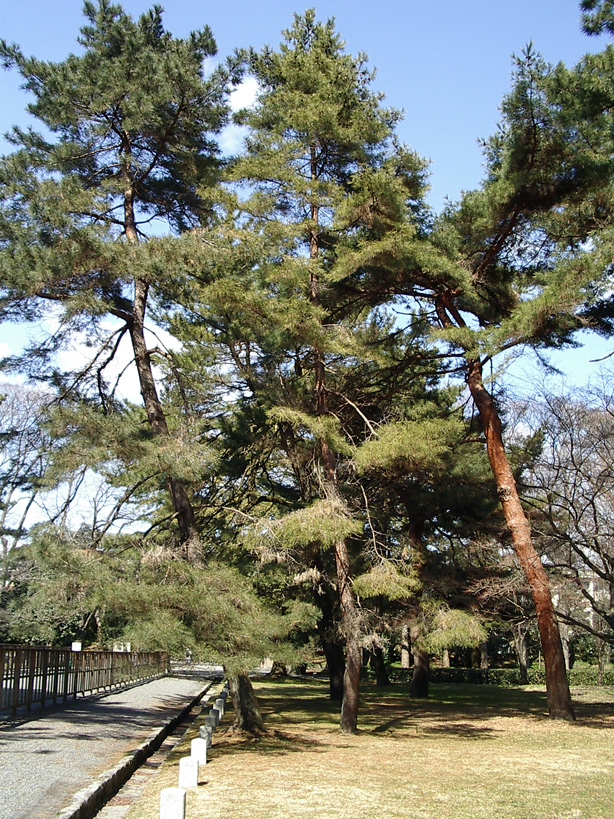
Planted in a Japanese park

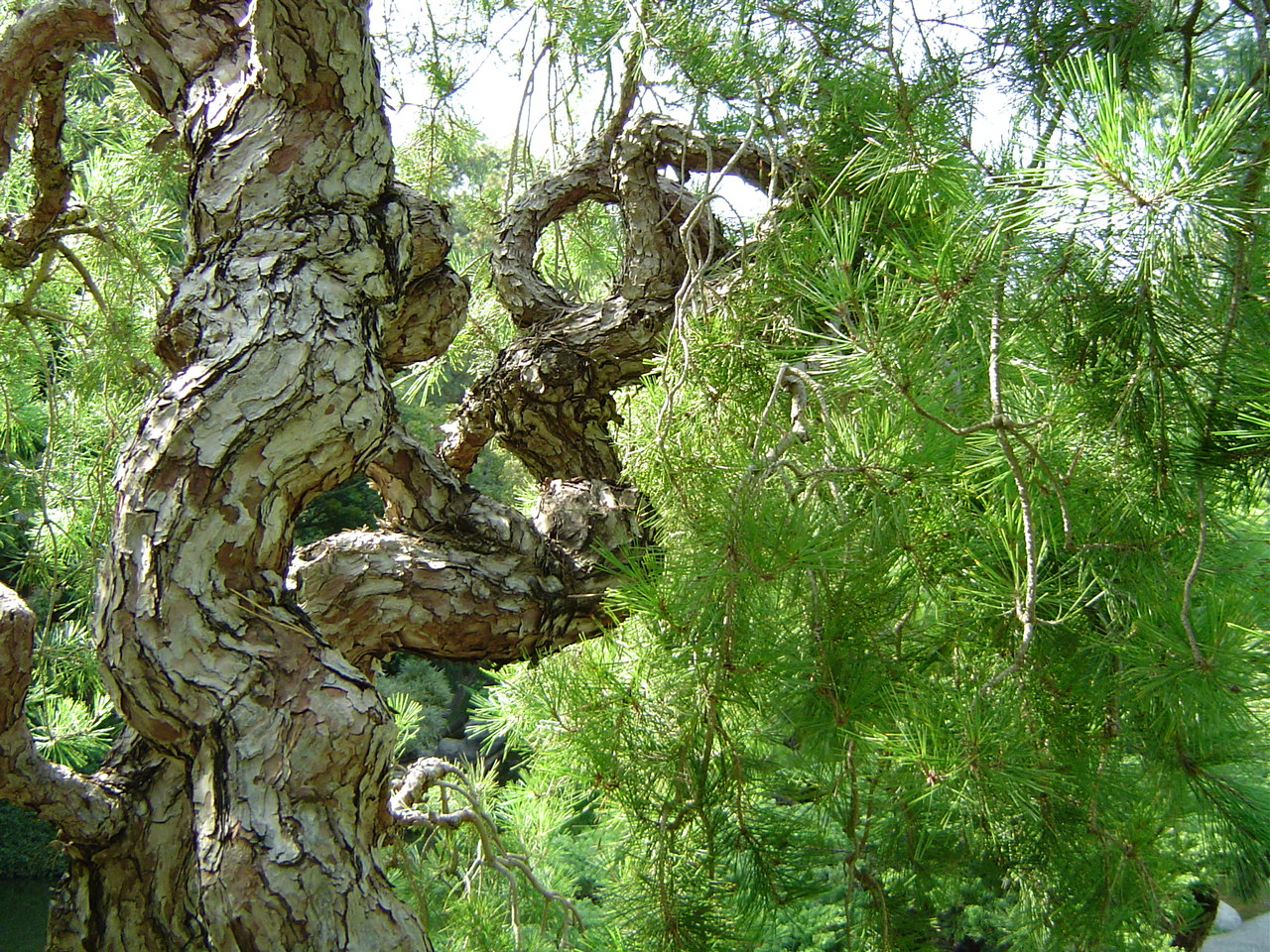
Cultivated Japanese Red Pine 'Pendula' in Huntington Library's Japanese Garden

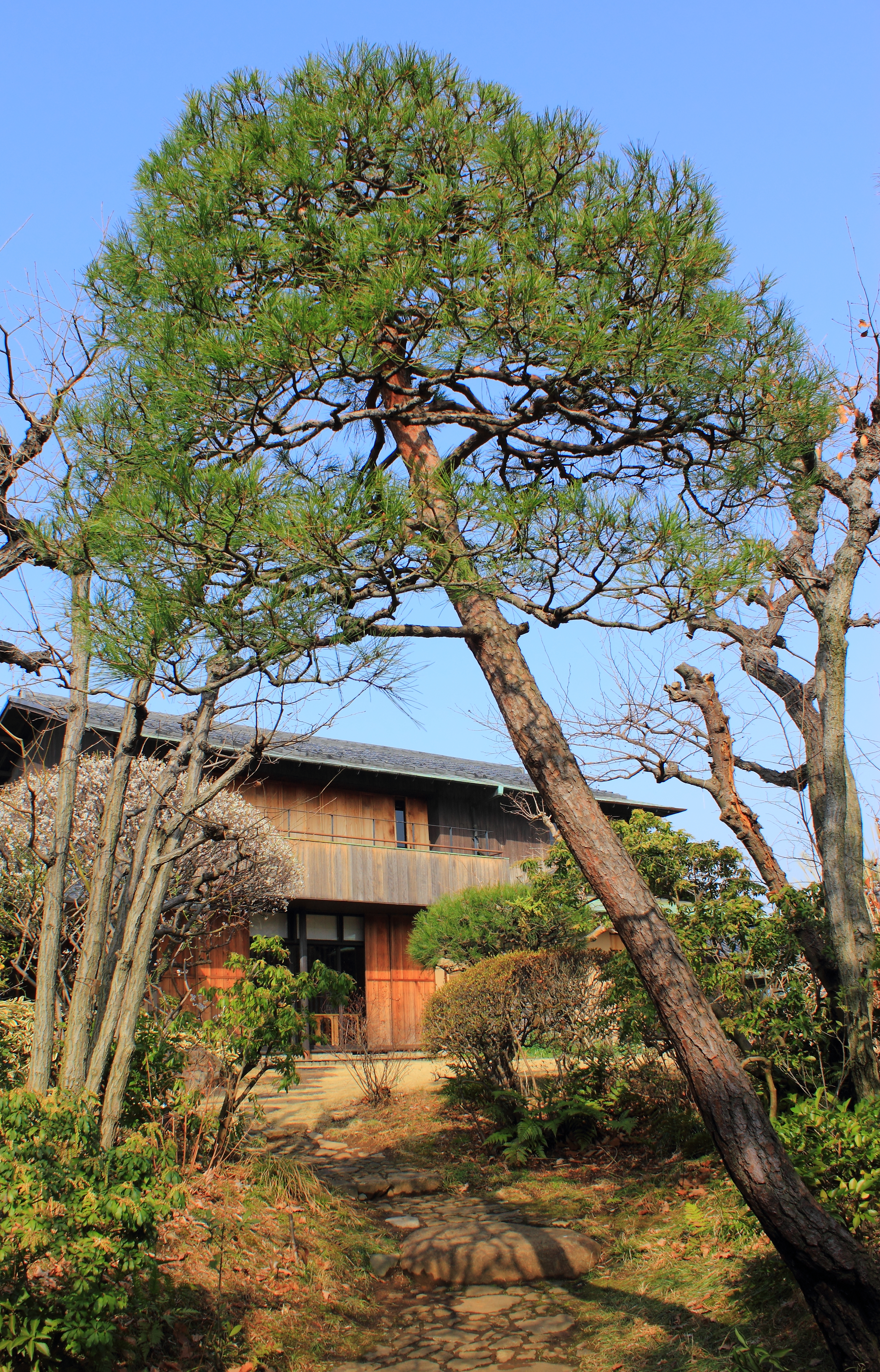
Planted in Japanese garden

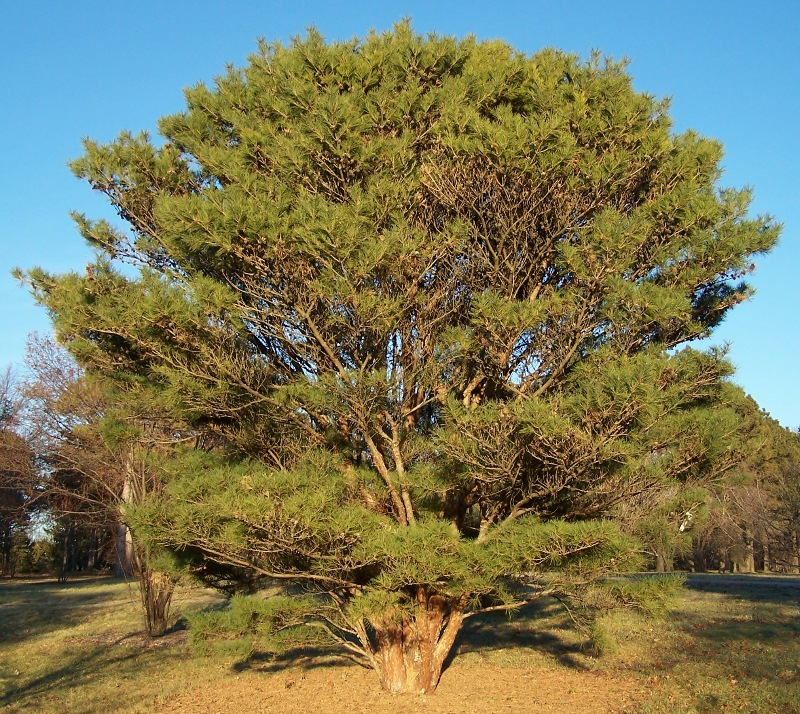
Var. "Umbraculifera'
"Tanyosho pine"

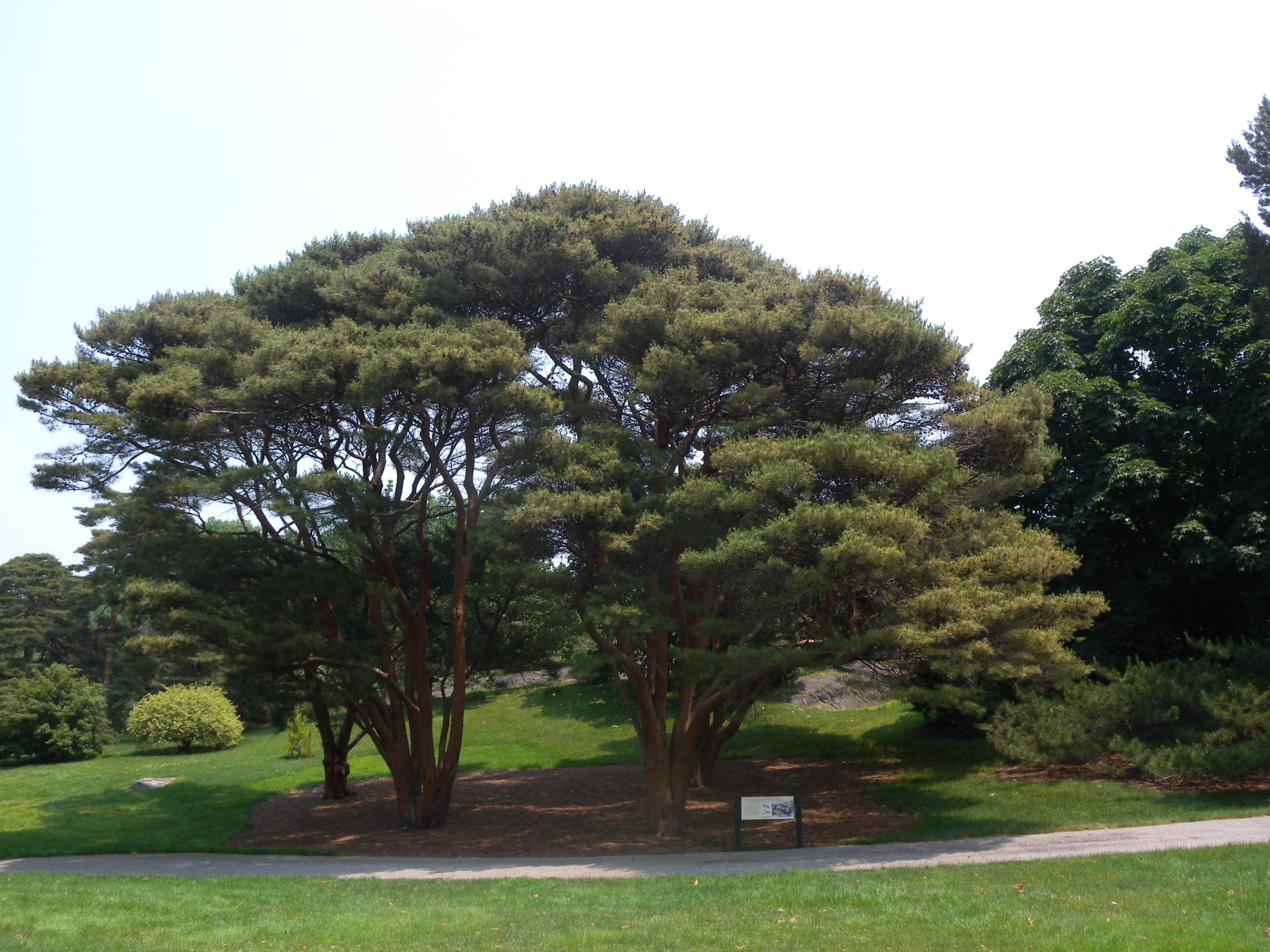
Planted in New York Botanical Garden

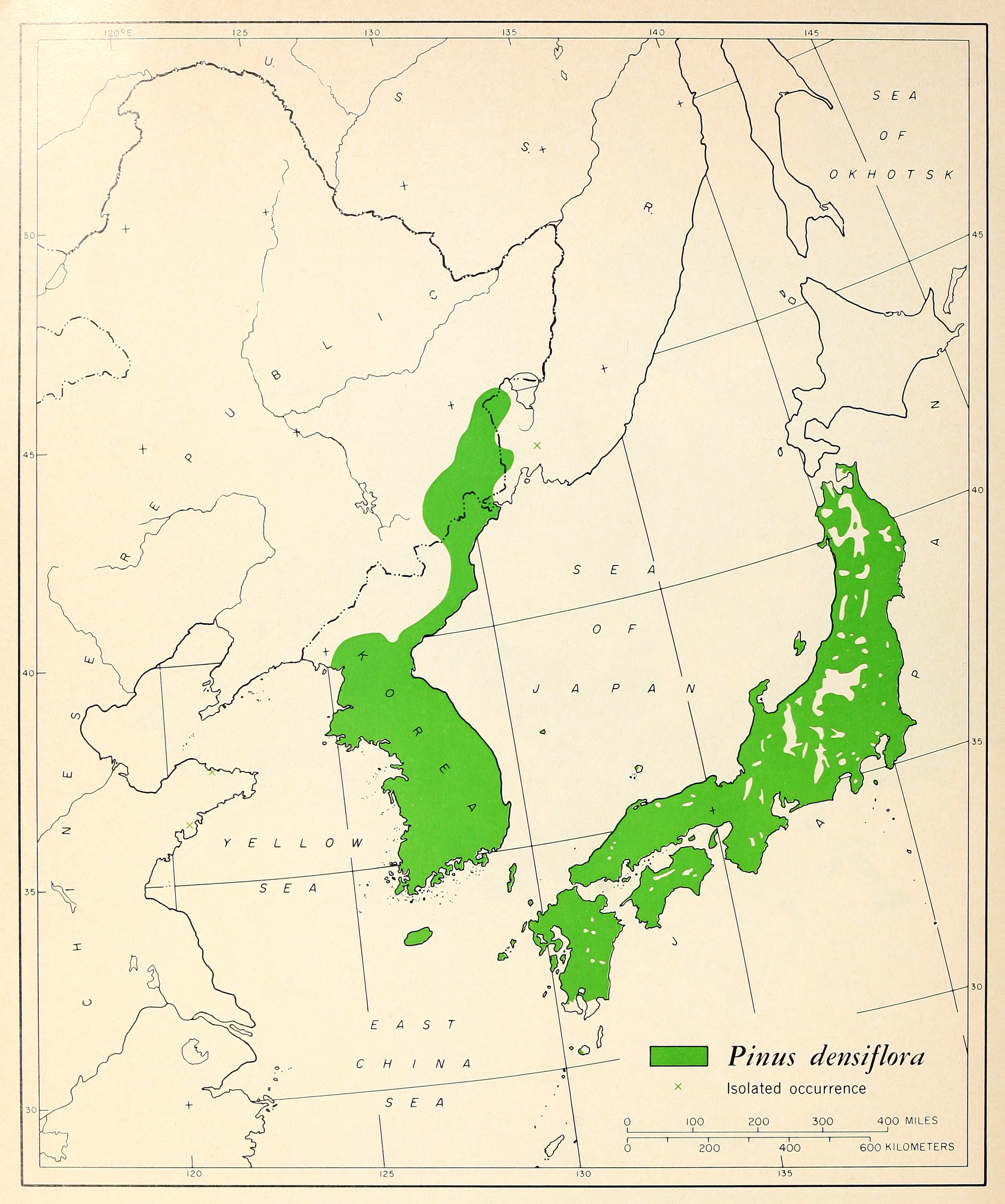
Pinus densiflora range map
