= Pinus × densithunbergii =

- At Hirosaki Castle

Scientific classification
- Kingdom: Plantae
- Clade: Tracheophytes
- Clade: Gymnosperms
- Division: Pinophyta
- Class: Pinopsida
- Order: Pinales
- Family: Pinaceae
- Genus: Pinus
- Species: P. × densithunbergii

Binomial name
- Pinus × densithunbergii Uyeki

Nothospecies of plant of plant

Pinus × densithunbergii is a naturally occurring hybrid species of conifer in the family Pinaceae. It is the result of crosses between Pinus densiflora (Japanese red pine or Korean red pine) and Pinus thunbergii (Japanese black pine), found in South Korea and Japan where the parent species' ranges overlap. The specific epithet densithunbergii is an example of a portmanteau word, a combination of the two parents' names. A tree reaching 10 to 20 m (33 to 66 ft), is hardy in USDA Zones 5 to 8, and is resistant to coastal salt spray. Its 1.5 m (5 ft) dwarf cultivar 'Jane Kluis' has gained the Royal Horticultural Society's Award of Garden Merit.
