= O-dihydroxycoumarin 7-O-glucosyltransferase =

Enzyme

o-dihydroxycoumarin 7-O-glucosyltransferase

Identifiers
- EC no.: 2.4.1.104
- CAS no.: 74114-37-7

Databases
- IntEnz: IntEnz view
- BRENDA: BRENDA entry
- ExPASy: NiceZyme view
- KEGG: KEGG entry
- MetaCyc: metabolic pathway
- PRIAM: profile
- PDB structures: RCSB PDB PDBe PDBsum
- Gene Ontology: AmiGO / QuickGO
Search
- PMC: articles
- PubMed: articles
- NCBI: proteins

o-dihydroxycoumarin 7-O-glucosyltransferase (EC 2.4.1.104) is an enzyme that catalyzes the chemical reaction

daphnetin
+ UDP-glucose
UDP
daphnin

The two substrates of this enzyme characterised from tobacco are daphnetin and UDP-glucose. Its products are daphnin and uridine diphosphate (UDP).

This enzyme belongs to the family of glycosyltransferases, specifically the hexosyltransferases. The systematic name of this enzyme class is UDP-glucose:7,8-dihydroxycoumarin 7-O-beta-D-glucosyltransferase. Other names in common use include uridine diphosphoglucose-o-dihydroxycoumarin, 7-O-glucosyltransferase, and UDP-glucose:o-dihydroxycoumarin glucosyltransferase.
