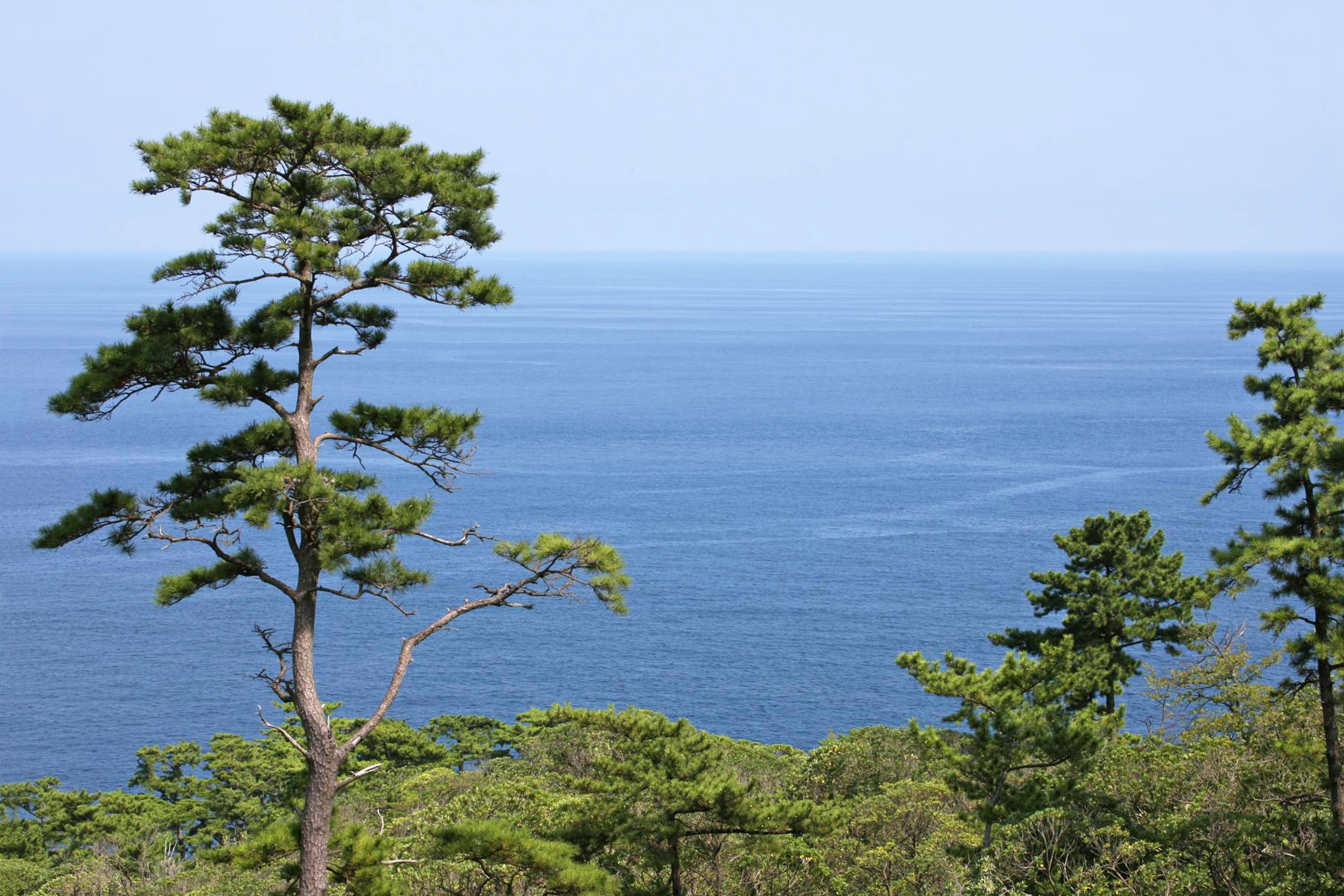
- Japanese black pines on Izu Ōshima, Japan

Conservation status
- Least Concern (IUCN 3.1)

Scientific classification
- Kingdom: Plantae
- Clade: Tracheophytes
- Clade: Gymnosperms
- Division: Pinophyta
- Class: Pinopsida
- Order: Pinales
- Family: Pinaceae
- Genus: Pinus
- Subgenus: P. subg. Pinus
- Section: P. sect. Pinus
- Subsection: P. subsect. Pinus
- Species: P. thunbergii

Binomial name
- Pinus thunbergii Parl.

Synonyms
- Pinus thunbergiana Franco

= Pinus thunbergii =

Black pine

Species of conifer

Pinus thunbergii (syn. Pinus thunbergiana), the Japanese black pine, is a species of conifer in the family Pinaceae, a pine native to coastal areas of Japan (Kyūshū, Shikoku and Honshū) and South Korea.

It is called kuromatsu (黒松) in Japanese, gomsol (곰솔) in Korean, and hēisōng (黑松) in Chinese.

== Description ==
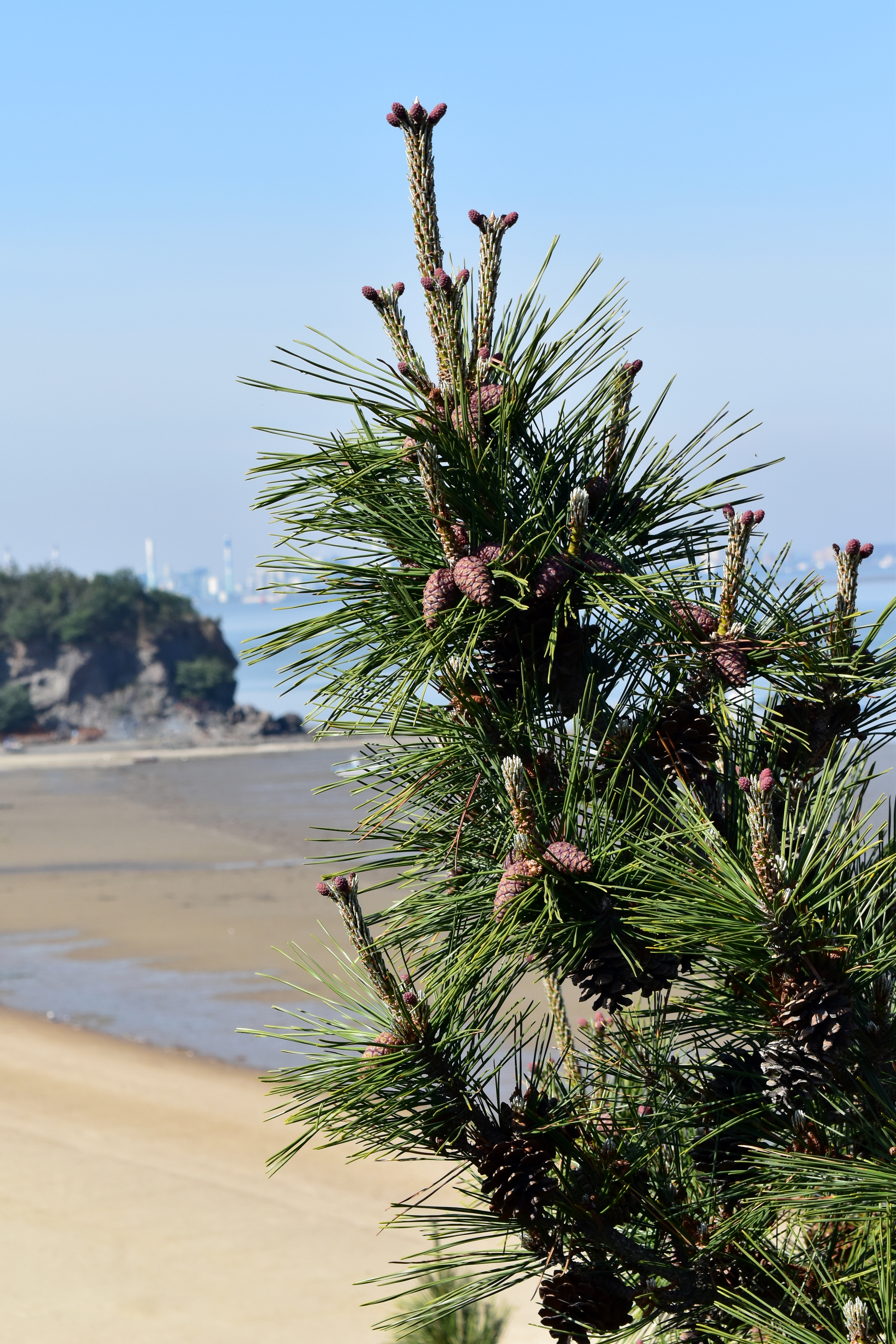
Foliage and cones, Chungcheongnam-do, South Korea

Japanese black pines can reach the height of 40 metres (130 feet), but rarely achieves this size outside its natural range. The bark is grey-brown on young trees and small branches, changing to dark blackish-grey and plated on larger branches and the trunk; becoming quite thick on older trunks. The needles are in fascicles of two with a greyish-white sheath at the base, 6–12 centimetres (2 1/4–4 3/4 inches) long. The female (seed) cones are green to purple when immature, ripening pale buff-brown to greyish-buff, 4–7 cm (1 1/2–2 3/4 in) in length, with numerous scales, with small mucro on the tips of the scales, taking a little under two years to maturity and opening in late winter. The male (pollen) cones are 1–2 cm (1/2–3/4 in) long, borne in clumps of 12–20 at the base of the new spring growth.

== Ecology ==
It occasionally hybridises with the related Pinus densiflora (Japanese red pine); the hybrid has been named Pinus × densithunbergii by the Japanese botanist Homiki Uyeki.

In North America this tree is subject to widespread mortality by the native American pinewood nematode, Bursaphelenchus xylophilus, spread by means of beetle vectors. Subsequently, blue stain fungus invades the plant, leading to a rapid decline and death. This nematode has also been introduced to Japan accidentally, leading to the species becoming endangered in its native area.

== Uses ==
In Japan it is widely used as a garden tree, both untrained growing as an overstorey tree, and trained as niwaki. The trunks and branches are trained from a young age to be elegant and interesting to view. It is one of the classic bonsai subjects, requiring great patience over many years to train properly.

=== Cultivation ===
Because of its resistance to pollution and salt, it is a popular horticultural tree. It is a widely adapted plant with attractive dark green foliage.

=== Second flush of growth ===
One characteristic of the Japanese black pine that makes it desirable for bonsai, is the possibility of inducing a second flush of new growth and improved ramification in a single growing season. The Japanese black pine can be induced to produce new buds at the base of each spring candle by cutting the candles near the base as they elongate, a technique called "decandling". This technique will result, in a few weeks, in the flush of multiple new buds where the candle was cut; each of these new buds will result in turn in new candles and branches.

== Gallery ==
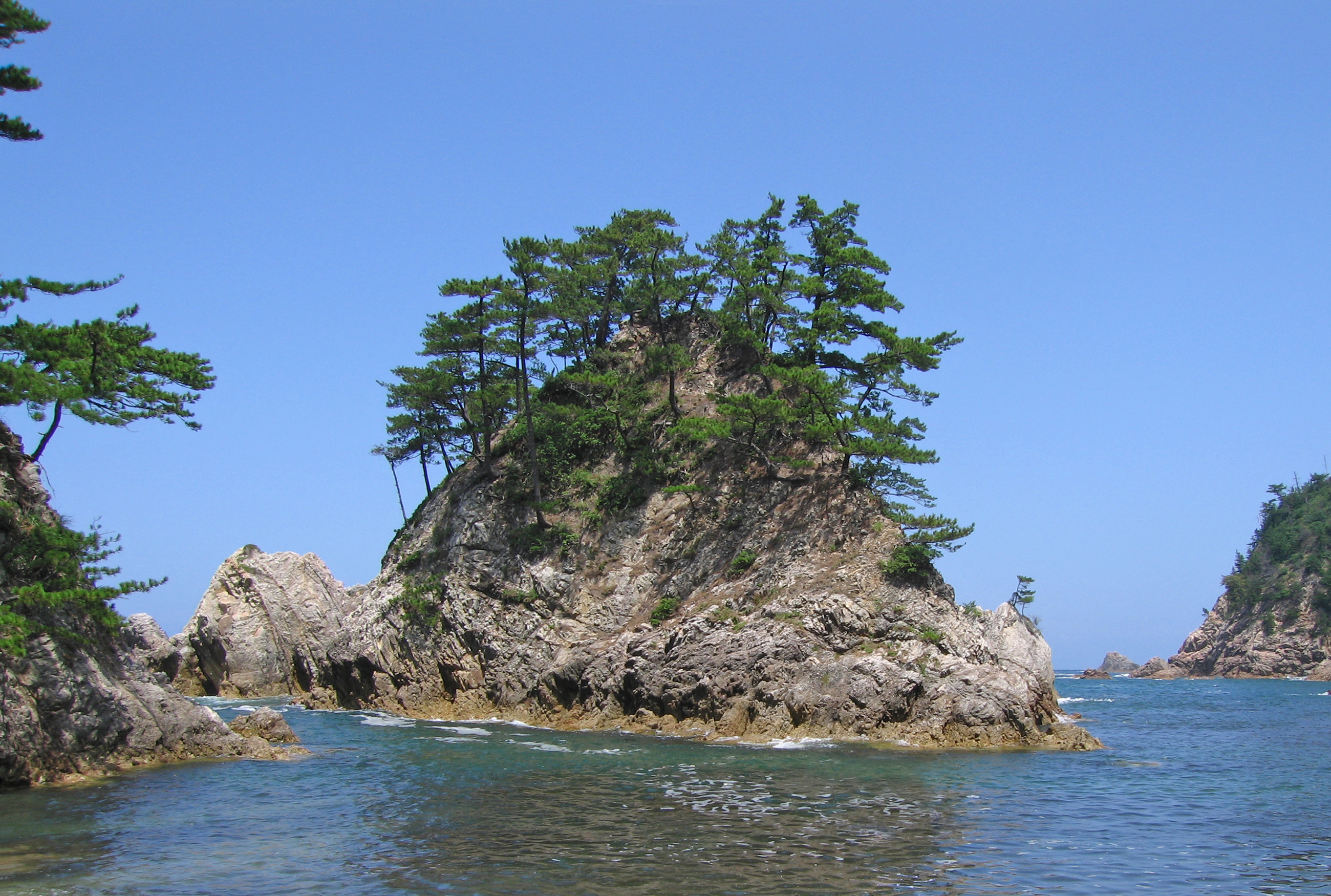
Pinus thunbergii on an offshore islet at Kamogaiso, Uradome-Kaigan, Iwami-town, Tottori Prefecture, Japan.

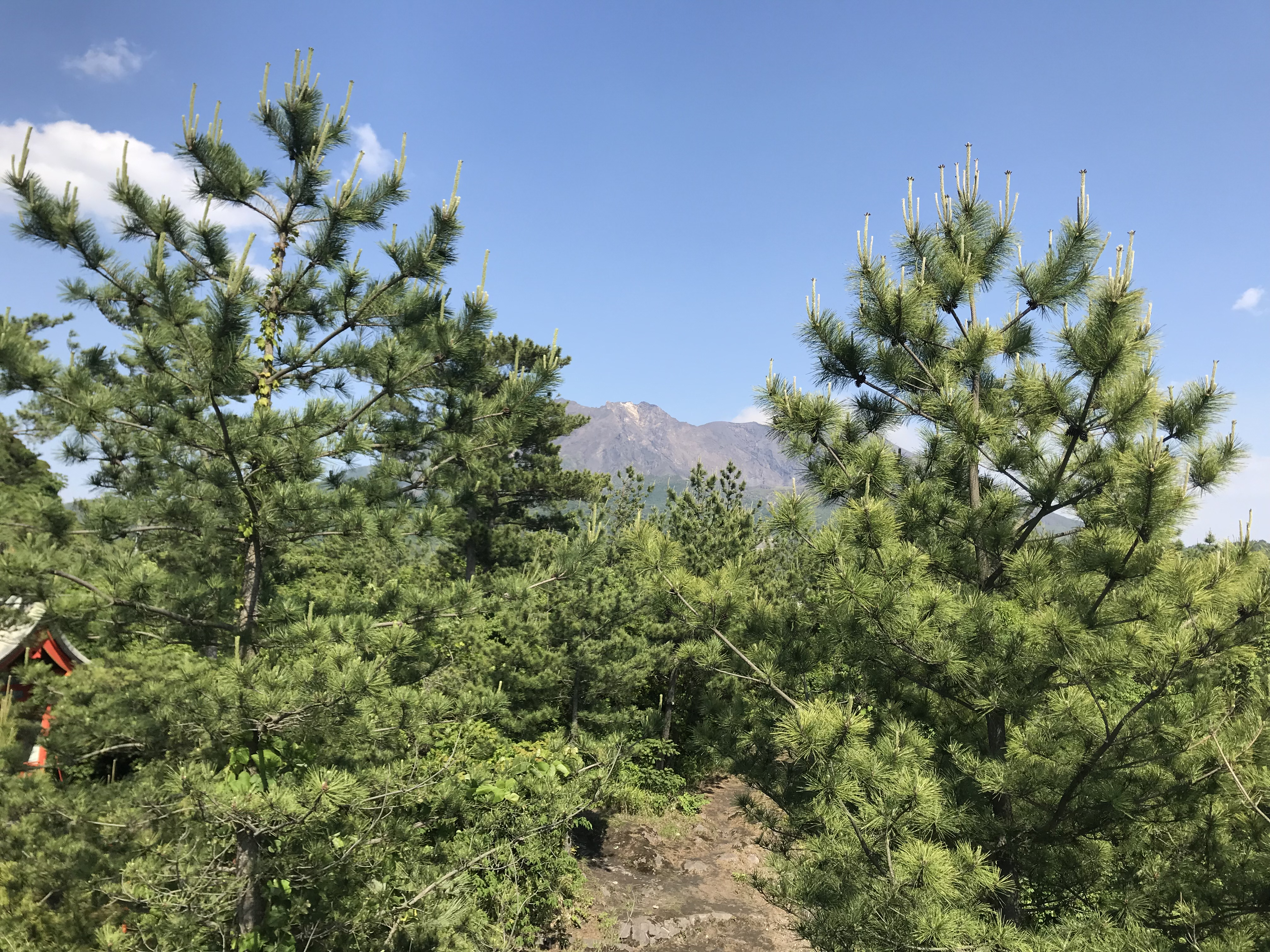
Young Japanese black pines on the lower slopes of Sakurajima, Kyushu.

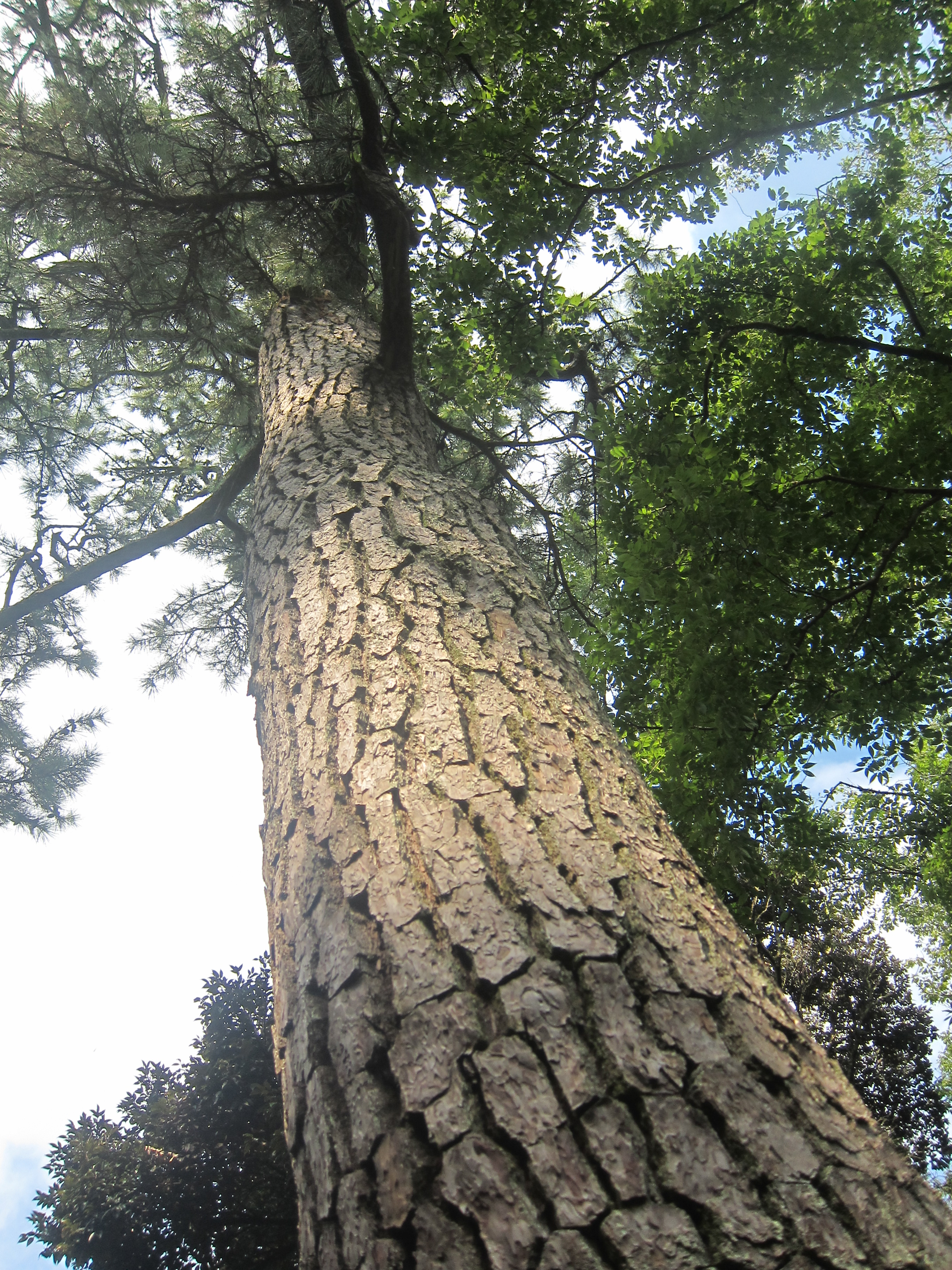
Close up of trunk in Enoshima.

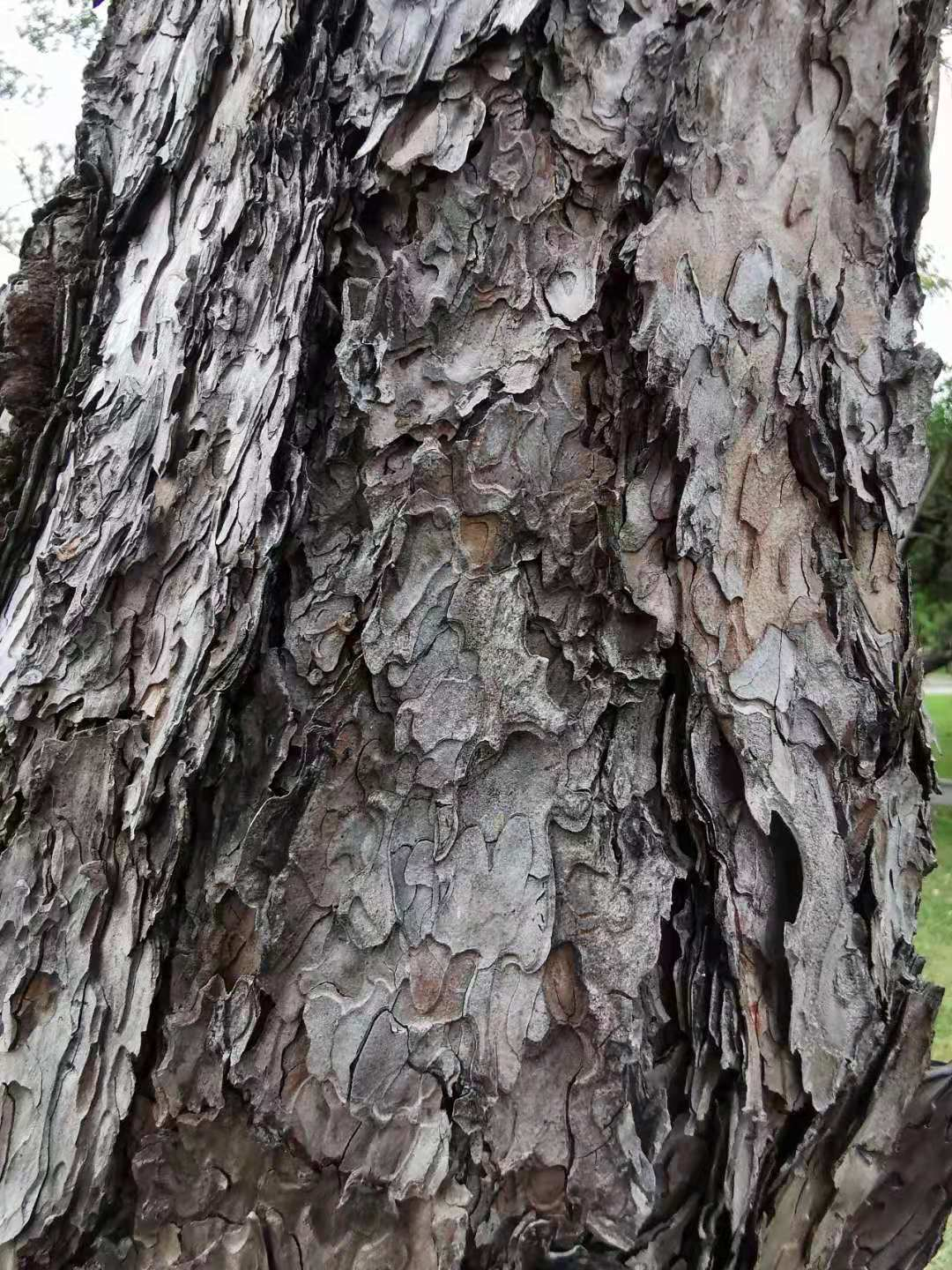
Close up, the bark seems to be made up of countless shiny metal pieces.

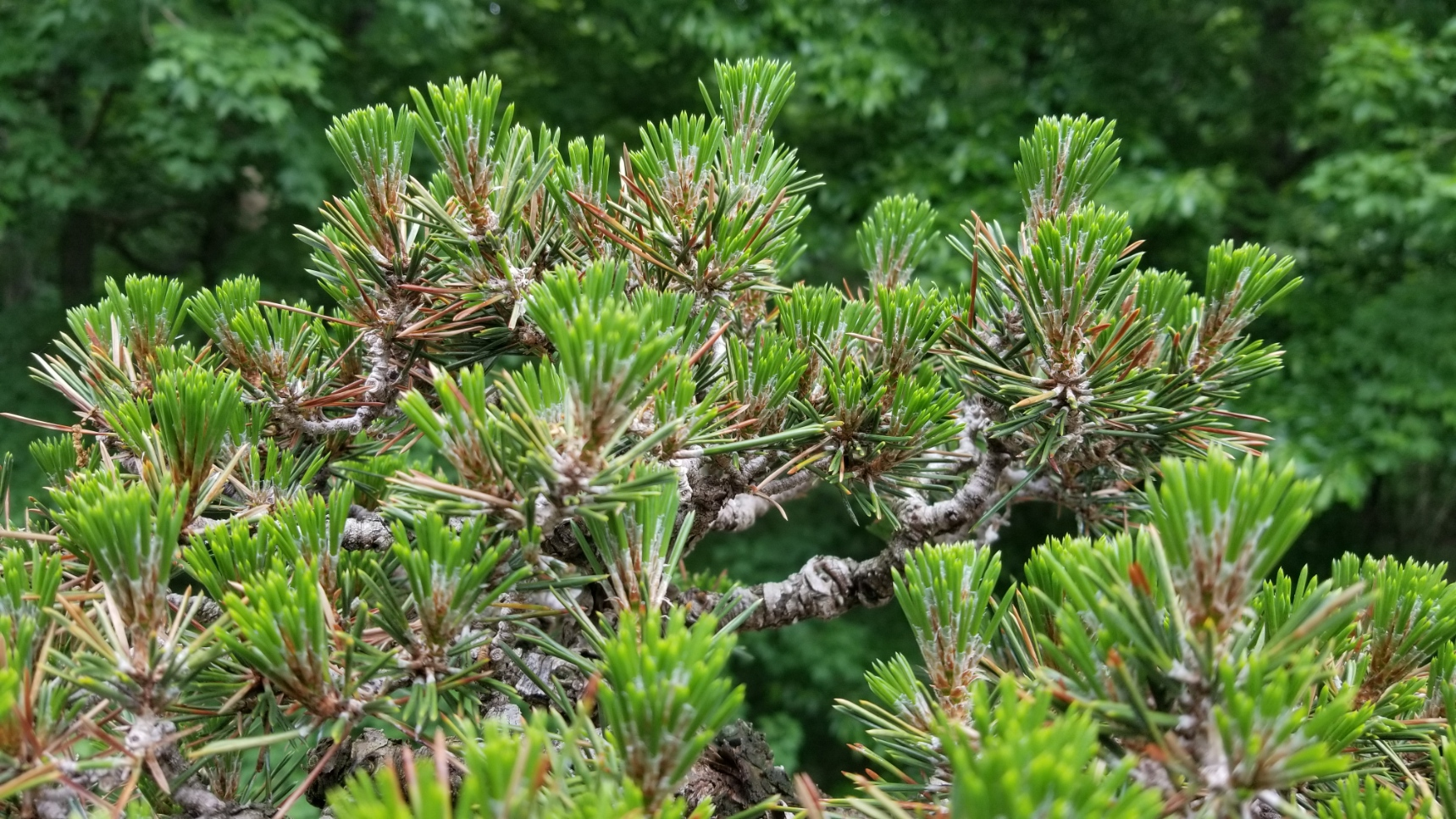
Spring candles elongating in early summer in a trimmed Japanese black pine.

Pinus thunbergii bonsai.

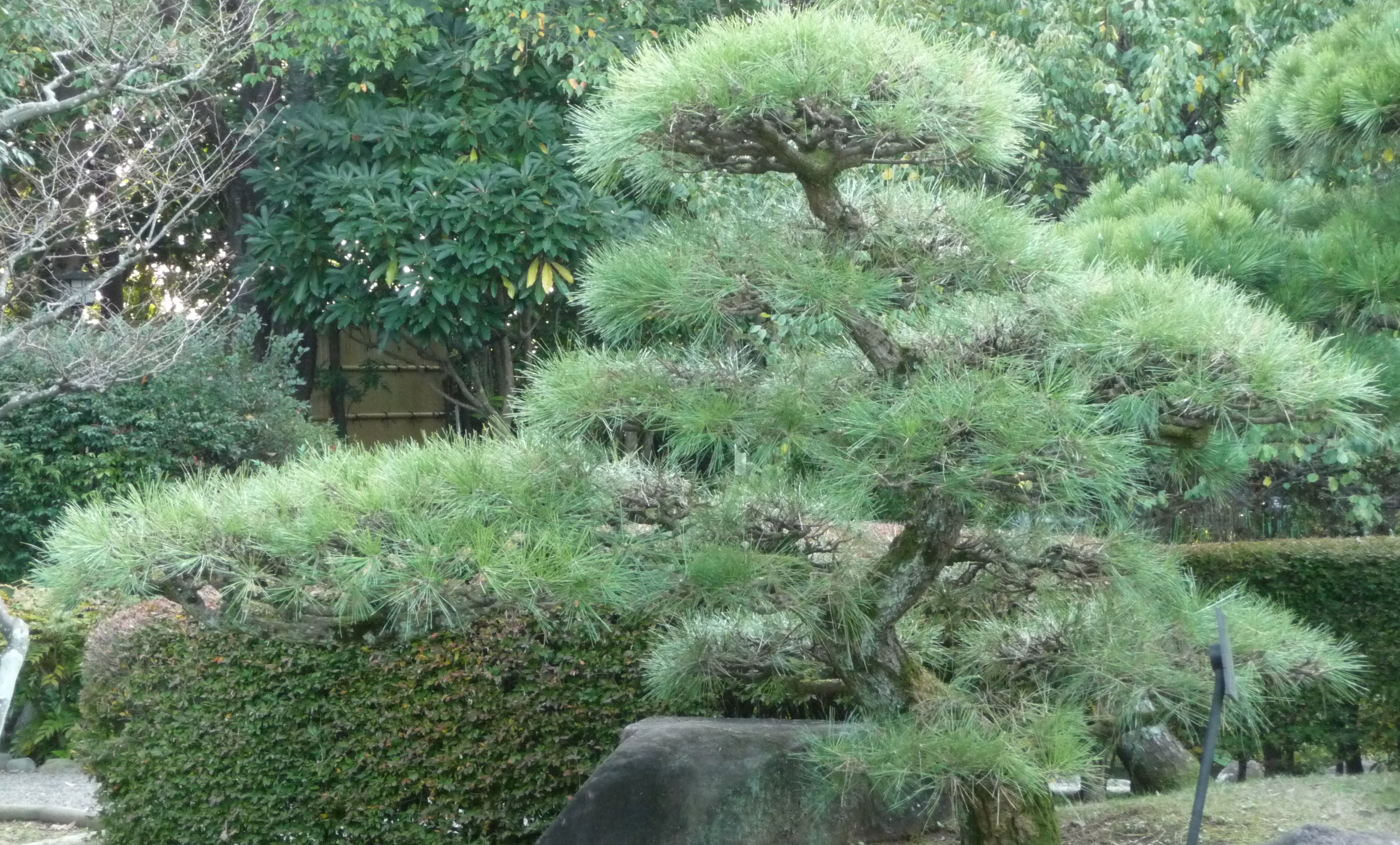
Well trimmed, small in Ichikawa, Chiba.

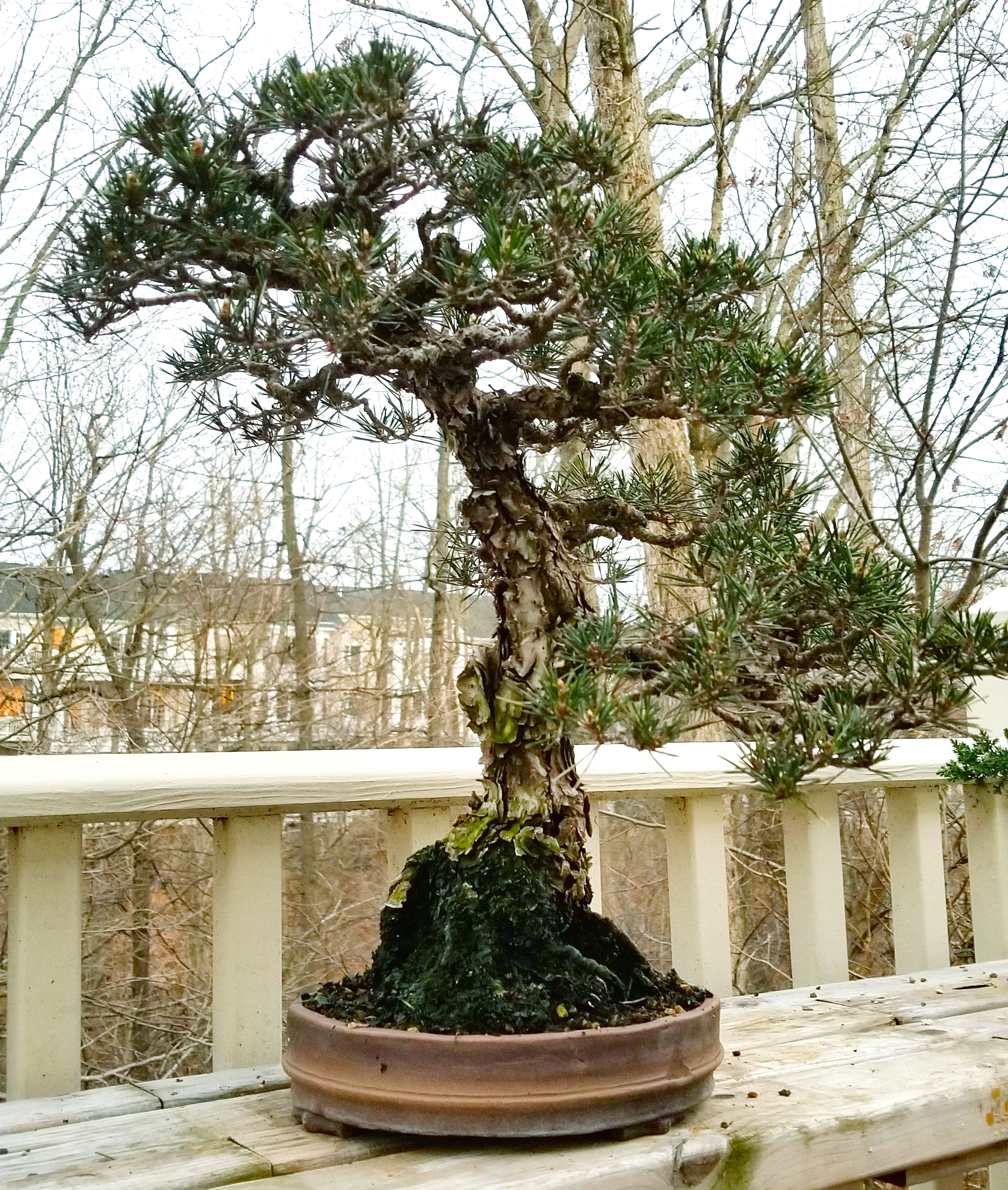
Pinus thunbergii 'Kotobuki' as bonsai. This tree is over 65 years old and prized with its flaky bark and very short needles.
