= Mezerein =

Names
- Other names meserein; 12β-[(E,E)-5-Phenyl-2,4-pentadienoyloxy]daphnetoxin; daphnetoxin,12-[(1-oxo-5-phenyl-2,4-pentadienyl)oxy]-,12-beta(E,E)]

Identifiers
CAS Number	34807-41-5
3D model (JSmol)	Interactive image
Beilstein Reference	1675867
ChemSpider	21242853
ECHA InfoCard	100.159.782
EC Number	631-545-8
PubChem CID	24832075
UN number	2811
CompTox Dashboard (EPA)	DTXSID3025673
- InChI: InChI=1S/C38H38O10/c1-21(2)36-30(44-27(40)18-12-11-15-24-13-7-5-8-14-24)23(4)37-26-19-22(3)29(41)35(26,43)33(42)34(20-39)31(45-34)28(37)32(36)46-38(47-36,48-37)25-16-9-6-10-17-25/h5-19,23,26,28,30-33,39,42-43H,1,20H2,2-4H3/b15-11+,18-12+/t23-,26-,28+,30-,31+,32-,33-,34+,35-,36+,37+,38-/m1/s1 Key: DLEDLHFNQDHEOJ-UDTOXTEMSA-N
- SMILES: OC[C@]12O[C@H]1[C@H]1[C@H]3O[C@]4(O[C@]1([C@H]1[C@@]([C@@H]2O)(O)C(=O)C(=C1)C)[C@@H]([C@H]([C@@]3(O4)C(=C)C)OC(=O)/C=C/C=C/c1ccccc1)C)c1ccccc1

Properties
Chemical formula	C_{38}H_{38}O_{10}
Molar mass	654.712 g·mol^{−1}
Melting point	258.0 to 262.0 °C; 496.4 to 503.6 °F; 531.1 to 535.1 K

Hazards
- GHS labelling
Pictograms	(GHS07: Exclamation mark)
Signal word	Warning
Hazard statements	H315, H317
Precautionary statements	P261, P264, P272, P280, P302+P352, P321, P332+P313, P333+P313, P362, P363, P501
NFPA 704 (fire diamond)	2 1 0
- Except where otherwise noted, data are given for materials in their standard state (at 25 °C [77 °F], 100 kPa). verify (what is ?) Infobox references

Mezerein is a toxic diterpene ester found in the sap of Daphne mezereum and related plants. Plants of the genera Euphorbiaceae and Thymelaeaceae possess a wide variety of different phorbol esters, which share the capacity of mimicking diacylglycerol (DAG) and thus activating different isoforms of protein kinase C. Mezerein was first isolated in 1975. It has antileukemic properties in mice, but it is also defined as a weak promoter of skin cancers in the same species. All parts of the plants contain an acrid and irritant sap that contains mezerein, thought to be the principal poison. The sap is especially prevalent in the bark and berries.

Mezerein is highly liposoluble and can cause vomiting, diarrhea and burning of the mouth. When a large dose is taken, there can be shivering, dilation of the pupils, damage to the oral passages and the intestine and even death. It can also irritate the skin, resulting in redness by slight damage of the veins. Because of causing this redness, the sap used to be applied as rouge.

== History and alternative uses ==
Mezerein can be found in Daphne mezereum. This plant has been used to make dyes, treat rheumatism and indolent ulcers and as a cosmetic. In homeopathy, the plant is used to treat primarily skin disorders but is also prescribed to treat anxiety related to digestive disorders and congestion. Once the toxicity of the plant was discovered, these uses were abandoned. The toxicity also led to new uses. In extreme cases, the berries are used to commit suicide.

== Mezerein and daphnetoxin ==
The toxins mezerein and daphnetoxin are both present in the genus Daphne. Daphnetoxin has a structure similar to mezerein, with the phenyl-pentadienoyl component (top left of the mezerein structural diagram) missing. They are both PKC activators but with a different selectivity: mezerein exhibits antileukemic properties while daphnetoxin does not.

== Mechanism of action ==
Mezerein is a second stage tumor promoter. According to the IPP model, tumorigenesis happens in three stages: initiation, promotion, and progression. In the first stage, initiation, a gene-mutation with change of function occurs. These mutations often occur in oncogenes or regulatory sequences. In the promotion stage, interaction with cellular signaling pathways takes place. This leads to growth advantage for initiated cells. In the last stage, progression, the tumor has become karyotypically instable: morphological changes in the normal chromosomal structure take place. This instability is caused by additional mutations. This leads to metastasis, hyperproliferation and loss of control by the cellular environment. There is an increased risk that the tumor cells will mutate other genes. Second stage tumor promoters like mezerein do not have the capacity to initiate tumors, but can create circumstances in which initiated cells are more susceptible to additional mutations or in which initiated cells have growth advantage. They do not cause mutations themselves: promotion happens through interference with cellular signaling pathways.

Mezerein and other phorbol esters interact with protein kinase C (PKC). Protein kinase C controls the cell cycle, so chemicals that interact with it can have pro-proliferative or anti-proliferative effects. PKC is normally activated by diacyl glycerol (DAG). Upon DAG binding to PKC, PKC's affinity for Ca^{2+} and membrane phosphoinositols is increased. After binding Ca^{2+}, the DAG-PKC-Ca^{2+} complex is attached to the plasma membrane by binding to membrane phosphoinositols. Now, PKC can phosphorylate various substrates, affecting the activity of several intracellular pathways that regulate cell cycle and apoptosis among others. PKC binding to the plasma membrane is reversible, because after a short period of time DAG is enzymatically degraded, causing PKC to undergo a conformational change and detach from the membrane and stop phosphorylating substrates.

Mezerein binds to PKC instead of DAG. It has a higher affinity for PKC than DAG does, and it cannot be degraded as easily as DAG. Therefore, when mezerein is bound, PKC remains in the active conformation much longer than it normally does. Furthermore, when mezerein has bound to PKC, PKC no longer requires Ca^{2+} for activation. This causes overstimulation of the pathways PKC initiates, leading to more cellular proliferation and less apoptosis.

However, it seems that chronic activation of PKC leads to a negative effect, that is, apoptosis. Furthermore, high doses of mezerein have been used to terminally differentiate cancer cells, preventing their growth. Thus, mezerein can have both carcinogenic and non-carcinogenic properties. Usually, low doses cause a beneficial effect and high doses cause a toxic effect.

== Dose-response relationships ==
Decrease in fibronectin levels dose-response curve

Stimulation of 2-DG dose-response curve

Mezerein has been shown to have two effects in chick embryo fibroblasts (CEF cells) that are associated with cancer. These effects are stimulation of 2-deoxy-D-glucose (2-DG) transport and causing of fibronectin loss. These effects are known to correlate with tumorigenicity in mice. Both effects are mediated by PKC. The ability of mezerein to decrease fibronectin levels is 46-fold lower than its ability to stimulate 2-DG transport. In related compounds, the difference between the two effects is usually 2- to 9-fold. This may have something to do with the weak tumorigenicity of mezerein.

The shape of the 2-DG transport dose-response curve has an optimum at a mezerein concentration of approximately 50 ng/mL. This is atypical, since a dose-response curve usually is S-shaped. The explanation for this behaviour is unknown. Possibly, at high concentrations, mezerein is converted by enzymes that have low affinity for it. That would lower the effective concentration and thus decrease the effects. In this picture, a NOAE-level can be observed between mezerein concentrations of 0 to approximately 0.09 ng/mL. The concentration that gives half-maximal effects is reached for a low concentration of mezerein: about 0.7 ng/mL.

The shape of the fibronectin-decrease curve is more usual, although not quite: the separate parts of the curve are all more or less linear, which is not the case in an S-shaped curve. In this case, a maximum dose can be determined: above concentrations of about 103 ng/mL the effect remains more or less stable. A NOAE-level is visible for concentrations of up to 1 ng/mL of mezerein. The concentration that gives half-maximal effect is approximately 90 ng/mL. The difference with the half-maximal concentration for 2-DG transport is remarkable. Mezerein causes a 46-fold lower effect for fibronectin decrease than for 2-DG stimulation, and apparently only causes this effect at high concentrations. This might also correlate with mezerein being a weak tumor promoter.
