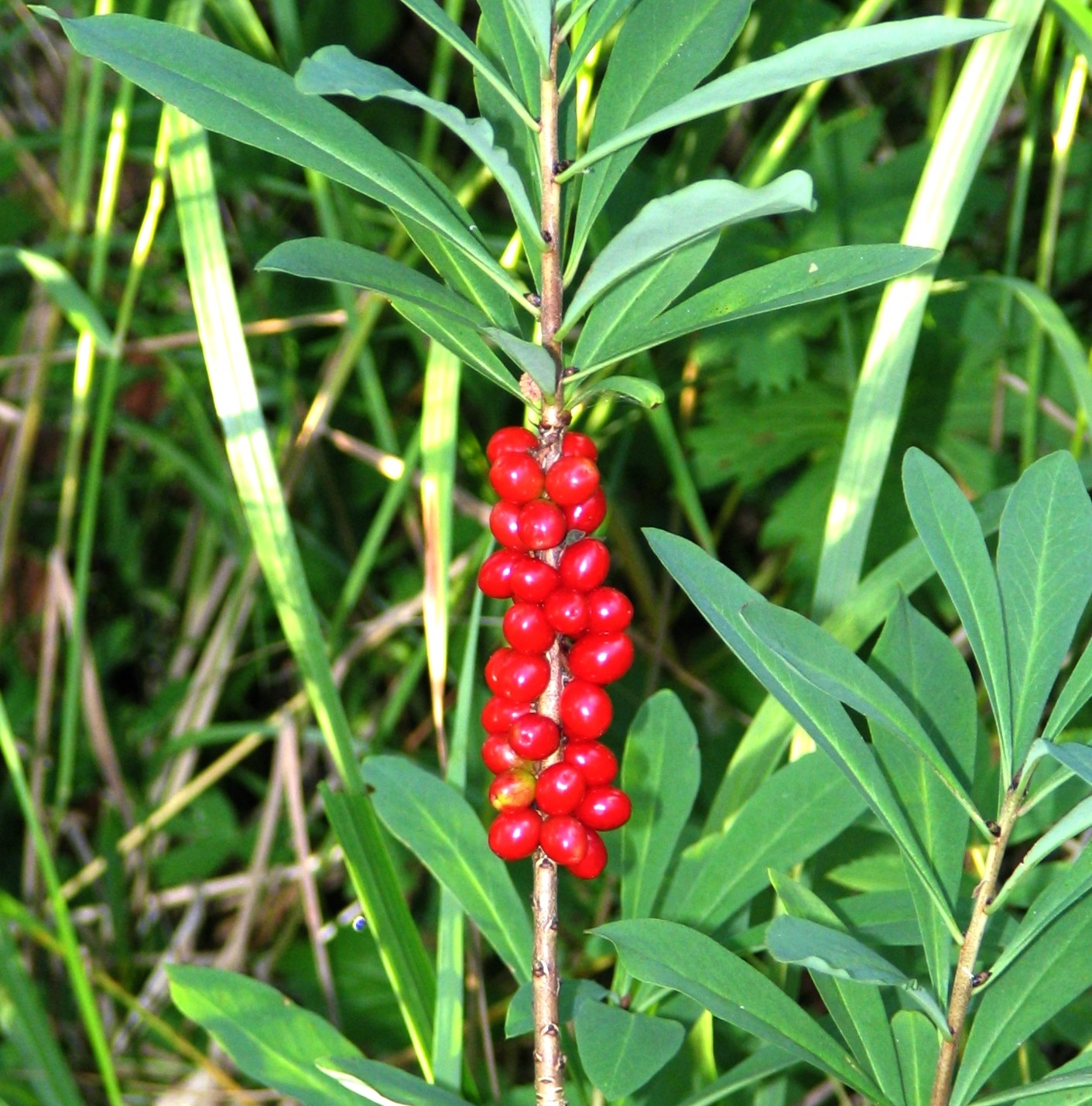
- Foliage and fruit

Conservation status
- Least Concern (IUCN 3.1)

Scientific classification
- Kingdom: Plantae
- Clade: Tracheophytes
- Clade: Angiosperms
- Clade: Eudicots
- Clade: Rosids
- Order: Malvales
- Family: Thymelaeaceae
- Genus: Daphne
- Species: D. mezereum

Binomial name
- Daphne mezereum L.

= Daphne mezereum =

Species of plant

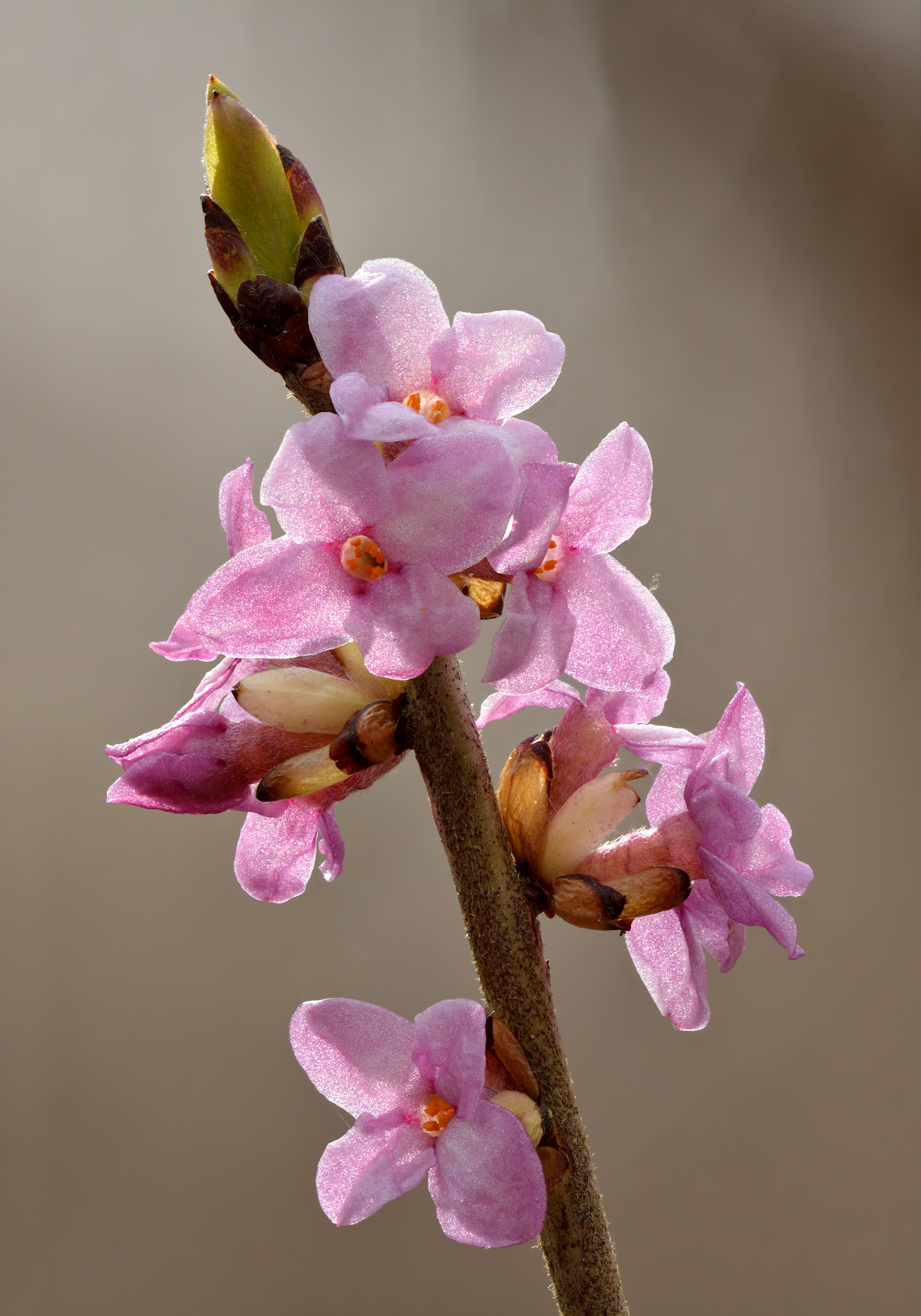
Flowers

Daphne mezereum, the mezereon, is a species of Daphne in the flowering plant family Thymelaeaceae, native to most of Europe and Western Asia, north to northern Scandinavia and Russia. In southern Europe it is confined to medium to higher elevations (up to 2600 m) in the subalpine vegetation zone, but descends to sea level in northern Europe. It is generally confined to soils derived from limestone. In the United Kingdom, the native population became a protected species in 1975 under the Conservation of Wild Creatures and Wild Plants Act.

== Description ==
It is a deciduous shrub growing to 1–1.5 metres (3–5 ft) tall. The leaves are glabrous, soft, 3–10 cm long and 1–2 cm broad, arranged spirally on the stems. The flowers are produced in early to mid spring (February to May; or later at high altitudes) on the bare stems just before or as the leaves appear, wreathed along the stems in clusters of two to four from each bud. They are sessile, have a four-lobed pink or light purple (rarely white) perianth 10–15 mm diameter, and are strongly scented. The flowers are self-fertile (unlike Daphne laureola), able to produce fruit without cross-pollination from a second plant. The fruit is a bright red drupe 7–12 mm diameter (yellow in plants with white flowers); it is very poisonous for humans, though fruit-eating birds like thrushes are immune and eat them, dispersing the seeds in their droppings.

== Taxonomy ==
Two subspecies are accepted by the Plants of the World Online database; they are not considered distinct by the Euro+Med Plantbase, which treats the species as monotypic.

- Daphne mezereum subsp. mezereum — throughout the species range
- Daphne mezereum subsp. rechingeri (Wendelbo) Halda — southeastern Transcaucasus to northern Iran

== Etymology ==
The name 'mezereon' is from Arabic مازريون māzaryün via mediaeval Latin; the species name mezereum is of the same origin, by modern Latin.

== Toxicity ==
Daphne mezereum is very toxic because of the compounds mezerein and daphnin, present especially in the berries and twigs. If poisoned, victims experience a choking sensation. Handling the fresh twigs can cause rashes and eczema in sensitive individuals. Despite this, it is commonly grown as an ornamental plant in gardens for its attractive, scented flowers.

=== Symptoms of poisoning ===
Ingestion of plant parts leads within a few hours to severe irritation and a burning sensation in the mouth, with swelling of the lips and face, increased salivation, hoarseness and difficulty in swallowing. These symptoms are soon followed by severe abdominal pain, headache, numbness, nausea and bloody diarrhoea. Children (who may be poisoned by the attractive red fruit) often show additional narcotic symptoms with muscular twitching. Work by Frohne and Pfänder has determined that it is the chewed seed, not the fruit pulp, that is responsible for the severe symptoms in poisoning by the berries.

=== 1955 case study involving consumption of flowers ===
A seven-year-old boy who was admitted to hospital (Department of Pediatrics, University Hospital Heidelberg) after consuming several flowers of D. mezereum (number unspecified) at first exhibited symptoms very similar to acute appendicitis, with headache and abdominal pain.

...a number of neurologically and psychically striking symptoms developed in the hours that followed: periods of complete disorientation and very severe motor unrest alternated with periods of complete clarity, with tetanoid fearfulness. Towards evening, signs of meningitis and finally generalised convulsions appeared. Very severe diarrhoea then heralded serious enteritis which only subsided after a week.

== Gallery ==
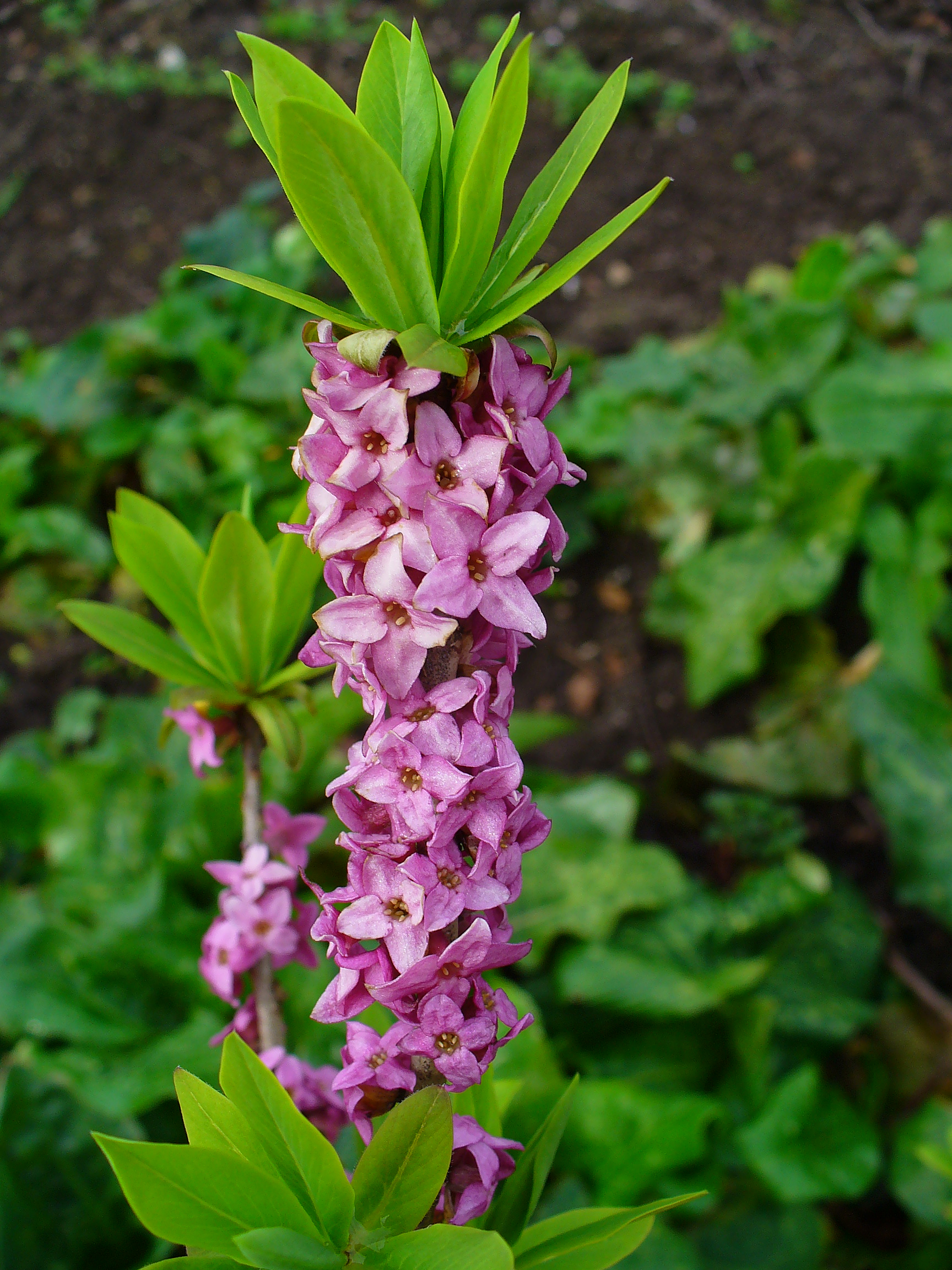
Flowering branch

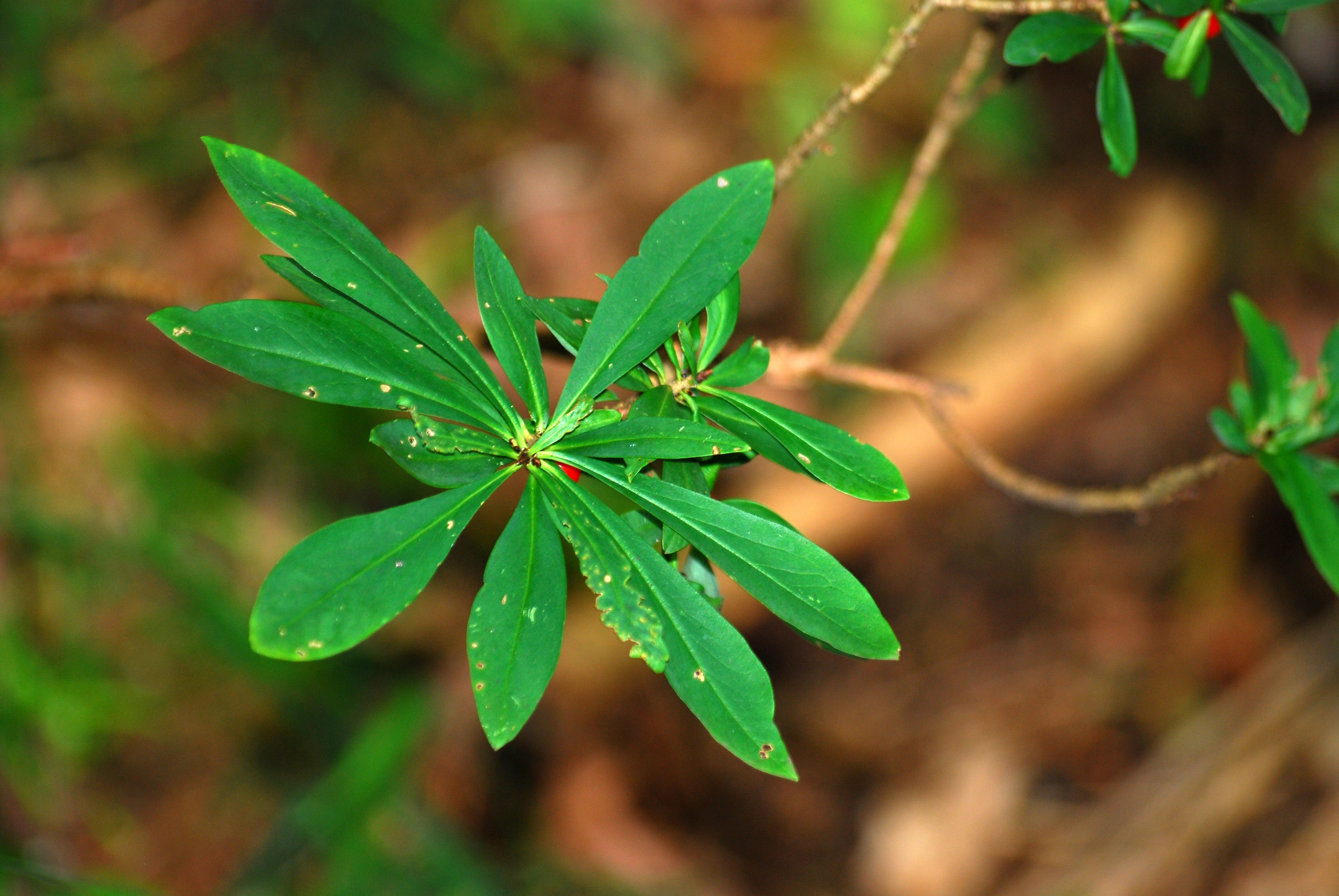
Leaves

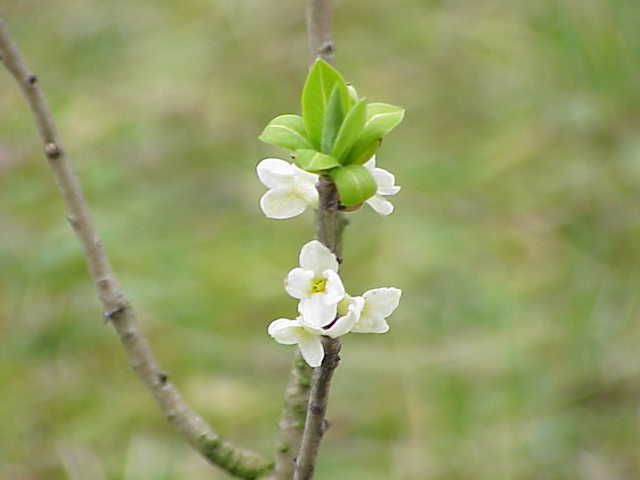
A white-flowered cultivar

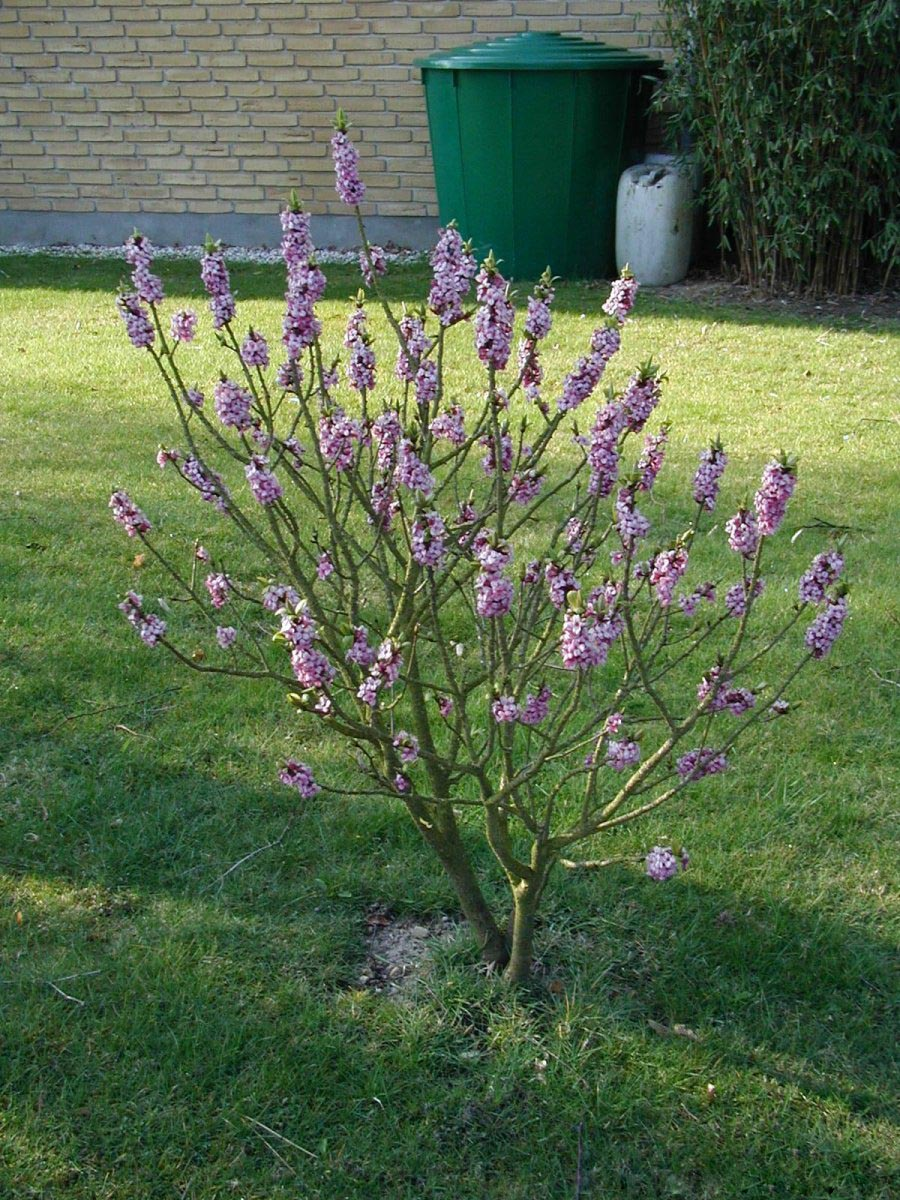
Cultivated plant in flower in March
