= Daphnetin =

Names
- IUPAC name 7,8-Dihydroxy-2H-chromen-2-one
- Other names 7,8-Dihydroxycoumarin

Identifiers
CAS Number	486-35-1
3D model (JSmol)	Interactive image
ChEBI	CHEBI:17313
ChEMBL	ChEMBL244948
ChemSpider	4444191
ECHA InfoCard	100.006.939
EC Number	207-632-8
KEGG	C03093
PubChem CID	5280569
UNII	XC84571RD2
CompTox Dashboard (EPA)	DTXSID00197560
- InChI: InChI=1S/C9H6O4/c10-6-3-1-5-2-4-7(11)13-9(5)8(6)12/h1-4,10,12H Key: ATEFPOUAMCWAQS-UHFFFAOYSA-N
- SMILES: C1=CC(=C(C2=C1C=CC(=O)O2)O)O

Properties
Chemical formula	C_{9}H_{6}O_{4}
Molar mass	178.143 g·mol^{−1}
Melting point	256 °C (493 °F; 529 K)

Hazards
- GHS labelling
Pictograms	(GHS07: Exclamation mark)
Signal word	Warning
Hazard statements	H315, H319
Precautionary statements	P264, P264+P265, P280, P302+P352, P305+P351+P338, P321, P332+P317, P337+P317, P362+P364
- Except where otherwise noted, data are given for materials in their standard state (at 25 °C [77 °F], 100 kPa). Infobox references

Daphnetin is a chemical compound with the molecular formula C_{9}H_{6}O_{4}. It has been isolated from plants of the genus Daphne. It has also been found in Matricaria chamomilla (chamomile).

It a crystalline solid with a melting point of 256 °C. It is soluble in boiling water.

Daphnetin can undergo enzymatic glycosylation to yield its 7-O-glucoside which is called daphnin (daphnetin 7-β-D-glucopyranoside). The reaction is catalyzed by the enzyme O-dihydroxycoumarin 7-O-glucosyltransferase. The glucose unit is transferred from UDP-glucose, with uridine diphosphate (UDP) as byproduct.

daphnetin
+ UDP-glucose
UDP
daphnin

Daphnetin shows several neuroprotective and anti-inflammatory effects on the inhibition of the TLR4/NF-κB mediated inflammatory signaling pathway. They also could inhibit the IKKs/IkBa/NF-κB, AKT, and the Src/FAK/ERK1/2 multi-target medication signaling pathway for anti-angiogenesis and cancer.

Daphnetin has been reported to be a strong sensitizer, which means that this compound and its glycosidic derivatives (e.g. daphnin) can be a cause of allergic reactions.
