= Aesculetin =

Names
- Preferred IUPAC name 6,7-Dihydroxy-2H-1-benzopyran-2-one
- Other names esculetin cichorigenin 6,7-dihydroxycoumarin

Identifiers
CAS Number	305-01-1
3D model (JSmol)	Interactive image; Interactive image
ChEBI	CHEBI:490095
ChEMBL	ChEMBL244743
ChemSpider	4444764
ECHA InfoCard	100.005.602
IUPHAR/BPS	5180
KEGG	C09263
PubChem CID	5281416
UNII	SM2XD6V944
CompTox Dashboard (EPA)	DTXSID3075383
- InChI: InChI=1S/C9H6O4/c10-6-3-5-1-2-9(12)13-8(5)4-7(6)11/h1-4,10-11H Key: ILEDWLMCKZNDJK-UHFFFAOYSA-N; InChI=1/C9H6O4/c10-6-3-5-1-2-9(12)13-8(5)4-7(6)11/h1-4,10-11H Key: ILEDWLMCKZNDJK-UHFFFAOYAQ
- SMILES: C1=CC(=O)OC2=CC(=C(C=C21)O)O; O=C/2Oc1cc(O)c(O)cc1\C=C\2

Properties
Chemical formula	C_{9}H_{6}O_{4}
Molar mass	178.14 g mol^{−1}
Appearance	white or light yellow powder
- Except where otherwise noted, data are given for materials in their standard state (at 25 °C [77 °F], 100 kPa). verify (what is ?) Infobox references

Aesculetin (also known as esculetin, 6,7-dihydroxycoumarin and cichorigenin) is a derivative of coumarin. It is a natural lactone that derives from the intramolecular cyclization of a cinnamic acid derivative.

It is present in chicory and in many toxic and medicinal plants, in form of glycosides and caffeic acid conjugates.

This compound is used in some sunscreens, but there is evidence that it acts as a photosensitizer for DNA damage. The sodium salt of its methyl-derivative is used in dermatology for the treatment of varicose veins.

It is a blue fluorescence compound found in plants. Aesculin, the glucoside of aesculetin, will fluoresce under long wave ultraviolet light (360 nm). The hydrolysis of aesculin results in loss of this fluorescence. Aesculetin has the ability to quench the inner fluorescence of bovine serum albumin.

Aesculetin can be transformed into scopoletin (7-hydroxy-6-methoxycoumarin) and isoscopoletin (6-hydroxy-7-methoxycoumarin) through incubation with rat liver catechol-O-methyltransferase.

Aesculetin can be synthesized by condensation of hydroxyhydroquinone triacetate with malic acid in concentrated sulfuric acid.

== See also ==
- Umbelliferone
