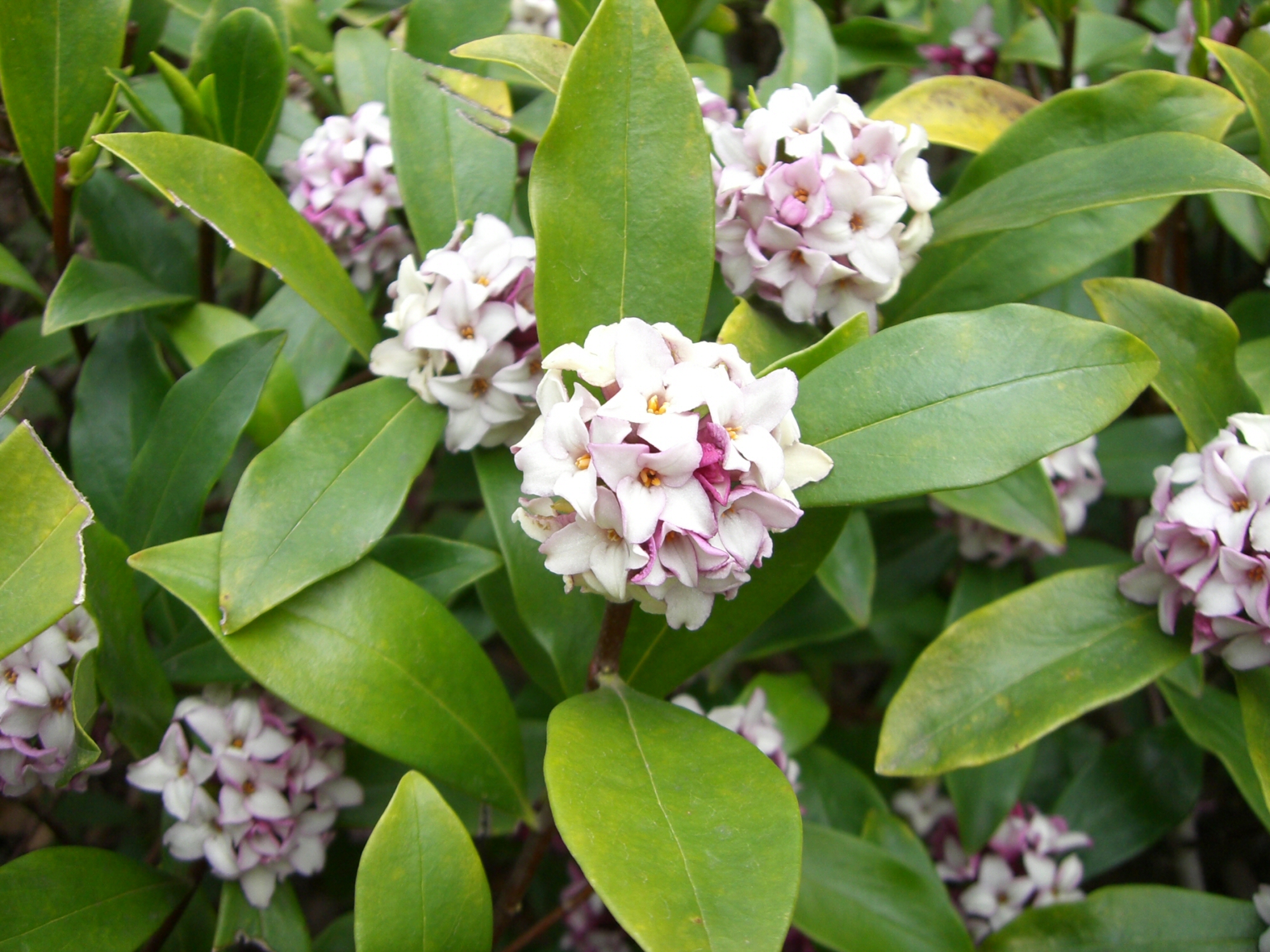

Scientific classification
- Kingdom: Plantae
- Clade: Tracheophytes
- Clade: Angiosperms
- Clade: Eudicots
- Clade: Rosids
- Order: Malvales
- Family: Thymelaeaceae
- Genus: Daphne
- Species: D. odora

Binomial name
- Daphne odora Thunb.

= Daphne odora =

Species of plant

Daphne odora, winter daphne, is a species of flowering plant in the family Thymelaeaceae, native to China, later spread to Japan and Korea. It is an evergreen shrub, grown for its very fragrant, fleshy, pale-pink, tubular flowers, each with four spreading lobes, and for its glossy foliage. It rarely fruits, producing red berries after flowering.

The Latin specific epithet odora means "fragrant". In Korea, the plant is also poetically called "chullihyang" – a thousand-mile scent – referring to the delightful fragrance of the flowers. In Japan, the plant is more commonly known as "jinchōge".

It grows best in fertile, slightly acid, peaty, well-drained soils. It grows in full sun or partial shade, and is hardy to −10 °C (14 °F), possibly lower.

Plants are not long lived, usually lasting eight to ten years. Daphne generally do not react well to root disturbance, and may transplant badly. D. odora is also susceptible to virus infection, which causes leaf mottling.

All parts of the plant are poisonous to humans and to a range of domestic animals. Some people experience dermatitis from contact with the sap.

Daphne odora may be propagated by semi-ripe cuttings in summer.

== Cultivars ==
- D. odora f. rosacea has white and pink flowers.
- D. odora f. rubra has dark red-pink flowers with reduced fragrance.
- D. odora 'Aureomarginata' has yellow edged leaves, and is hardier and more suitable to cultivation than the plain-leaved forms.
