= Idols South Africa season 5 =

Idols South Africa
- Season 5
- Hosted by: Liezel van der Westhuizen
- Judges: Dave Thompson; Mara Louw; Gareth Cliff; Randall Abrahams
- Winners: Jason Hartman / Sasha-Lee Davids
- Runner-up: -

Release
- Original network: M-Net
- Original release: 1 February – 10 May 2009

Season chronology
- ← Previous; Season 4 Next → Season 6

Idols South Africa V was the fifth season of South African reality interactive talent show based on the British talent show Pop Idol. It premiered on Sunday, 1 February 2009, with a summer vibe and new rules, after a short hiatus. Instead of the search happening in autumn–winter as with previous seasons, the auditions began in mid-December and run through the holiday season.

Colin Moss was unable to be the host of Season 5 due to movie commitments and the role open for auditions. Among those who auditioned were Top Billing presenter Janez Vermeiren, SABC 3 continuity presenter and radio DJ Liezl van der Westhuizen, television presenter and DJ Pabi Moloi – most recently seen in SABC 1s The Amazing Date —and Sami Sabiti, co-host of Idols 1. M-Net made an official announcement that Liezl van der Westhuizen will be the new host. She was presented to viewers in the first episode of Season 5 when Colin was run over by a car in a scene and she took the reins from him as the new host.

== Final voting disaster ==
At the finale, Sasha-Lee Davids was announced the winner, with 52.77% of the votes. Four days later, Idols SA announced that there had been problems with the voteline, and some of the votes that were sent before the cut-off time had not been counted. The investigation hit the front page of The Times on 8 May 2009 and later in the day it was announced on the Idols website that the recount had shown that Jason Hartman had received 200000 more votes than Davids (out of 2.3 million total votes in the finale's recount). After discussions between M-Net and FremantleMedia (the format owners), Hartman and Davids were declared joint winners. They both received identical full prizes. This was the first time a winner's prize was shared on an Idols show globally. Neither Hartman nor Davids ever appeared in the bottom 3 or 2 prior to the final.

== Finals ==
=== Finalists ===
(ages stated at time of contest)

Contestant	Age	Hometown	Voted Off
Jason Hartman	29	Durban	joint Winner
Sasha-Lee Davids	18	Cape Town	joint Winner
Graeme Watkins	26	Cape Town	27 Apr 2009
Lendel Moonsamy	23	Durban	20 Apr 2009
Sithembiso Nkosi	19	Johannesburg	13 Apr 2009
Cameron Bruce	17	Johannesburg	6 Apr 2009
Pixie Bennett	24	Durban	30 Mar 2009
Lize Heerman	21	Durban	23 Mar 2009
Daniel Barron	17	Johannesburg	16 Mar 2009
Ntsepa Pitjeng	26	Johannesburg	9 Mar 2009

== Elimination chart ==
Legend
Did Not Perform	Female	Male	Top 14	Top 10	Winner

Safe	Safe First	Safe Last	Eliminated

Stage:		Semi		Finals								
Week:		02/23	03/02	03/09	03/16	03/23	03/30	04/06	04/13	04/20	04/27	05/03
Place	Contestant	Result										
1-2	Jason Hartman											Winners
1-2	Sasha-Lee Davids											Winners
3	Graeme Watkins		Btm 5			Btm 3				Btm 2	Elim	
4	Lendel Moonsamy						Btm 2	Btm 2	Btm 2	Elim		
5	SiThembiso Nkosi			Btm 3					Elim			
6	Cameron Bruce					Btm 2	Btm 3	Elim				
7	Pixie Bennett	Btm 5	Btm 4	Btm 2			Elim					
8	Lize Heerman		Btm 3		Btm 2	Elim						
9	Daniel Baron	Btm 3			Elim							
10	Ntsepa Pitjeng			Elim								
11-12	Mathew Moolman		Elim									
11-12	Suzzi Swanepoel	Btm 4	Elim									
12-14	Thubalethu Myeki	Elim										
12-14	Juanita Alves	Elim										

=== Live Show Details ===
==== Heat 1 – Top 14 (22 February 2009) ====
Order	Artist	Song (original artists)	Result
1	Thembi Nkosi	"Hot Stuff" (Donna Summer)	Safe
2	Cameron Bruce	"Knock on Wood" (Eddie Floyd)	Safe
3	Juanita Alves	"Rehab" (Amy Winehouse)	Eliminated
4	Thubalethu Myeki	"You'll Be in My Heart" (Phil Collins)	Eliminated
5	Mathew Moolman	"Wonderful Tonight" (Eric Clapton)	Safe
6	Pixie Bennet	"Valerie" (Amy Winehouse)	Bottom five
7	Daniel Baron	"Won't Go Home Without You" (Maroon 5)	Bottom three
8	Sasha-Lee Davids	"Too Little Too Late" (JoJo)	Safe
9	Lizé Heerman	"Fever" (Peggy Lee)	Safe
10	Jason Hartman	"Undiscovered" (James Morrison)	Safe
11	Ntsepa Pitjeng	"I Don't Want to Wait" (Paula Cole)	Safe
12	Lendel Moonsamy	"Wait for You" (Elliott Yamin)	Safe
13	Graeme Watkins	"Beat It" (Michael Jackson)	Safe
14	Suzzi Swanepoel	"Strong Enough" (Cher)	Bottom four

==== Heat 2 – Top 12 (1 March 2009) ====
Order	Artist	Song (original artists)	Result
1	Lendel Moonsamy	"Over You" (Daughtry)	Safe
2	Mathew Moolman	"A Foggy Day" (Fred Astaire)	Eliminated
3	Lizé Heerman	"Relax, Take It Easy" (Mika)	Bottom three
4	Cameron Bruce	"Goodbye Philadelphia" (Peter Cincotti)	Safe
5	Suzzi Swanepoel	"I Try" (Macy Gray)	Eliminated
6	Jason Hartman	"When a Man Loves a Woman" (Percy Sledge)	Safe
7	Thembi Nkosi	"Immortality" (Celine Dion)	Safe
8	Pixie Bennet	"Black and Gold" (Sam Sparro)	Bottom four
9	Graeme Watkins	"Stop and Stare" (OneRepublic)	Bottom five
10	Daniel Baron	"Feel" (Robbie Williams)	Safe
11	Ntsepa Pitjeng	"If I Were a Boy" (Beyoncé)	Safe
12	Sasha-Lee Davids	"Bring Me to Life" (Evanescence)	Safe

==== Live Show 1 (8 March 2009) ====
Theme: Greatest Hits

Order	Artist	Song (original artists)	Result
1	Ntsepa Pitjeng	"Dancing in the Street" (Martha and the Vandellas)	Eliminated
2	Lendel Moonsamy	"Lady Soul" (The Temptations)	Safe
3	Sasha-Lee Davids	"I Will Love Again" (Lara Fabian)	Safe
4	Thembi Nkosi	"Always Be My Baby" (Mariah Carey)	Bottom three
5	Cameron Bruce	"Old Time Rock and Roll" (Bob Seger)	Safe
6	Daniel Baron	"Your Song" (Elton John)	Safe
7	Lizé Heerman	"Hallelujah" (Leonard Cohen)	Safe
8	Pixie Bennet	"Against All Odds (Take a Look at Me Now)" (Phil Collins)	Bottom two
9	Jason Hartman	"With a Little Help from My Friends" (The Beatles)	Safe
10	Graeme Watkins	"Unchain My Heart" (Joe Cocker)	Safe

==== Live Show 2 (15 March 2009) ====
Theme: Divas and Crooners

Order	Artist	Song (original artists)	Result
1	Cameron Bruce	"Everything" (Michael Bublé)	Safe
2	Jason Hartman	"Can't Buy Me Love" (The Beatles)	Safe
3	Thembi Nkosi	"Dangerously in Love" (Beyoncé)	Safe
4	Graeme Watkins	"My Way" (Frank Sinatra)	Safe
5	Sasha-Lee Davids	"All by Myself" (Celine Dion)	Safe
6	Lendel Moonsamy	"Moondance" (Van Morrison)	Safe
7	Pixie Bennet	"Little Bird" (Annie Lennox)	Safe
8	Daniel Baron	"Save the Last Dance for Me" (The Drifters)	Eliminated
9	Lizé Heerman	"Big Girls Don't Cry" (Fergie)	Bottom two

==== Live Show 3 (22 March 2009) ====
Theme: New Millennium

Order	Artist	Song (original artists)	Result
1	Jason Hartman	"Love's Divine" (Seal)	Safe
2	Sasha-Lee Davids	"Run" (Leona Lewis)	Safe
3	Lizé Heerman	"Crazy" (Gnarls Barkley)	Eliminated
4	Cameron Bruce	"Breakeven" (The Script)	Bottom two
5	Graeme Watkins	"Clocks" (Coldplay)	Bottom three
6	Thembi Nkosi	"Right Here (Departed)" (Brandy)	Safe
7	Lendel Moonsamy	"Closer" (Ne-Yo)	Safe
8	Pixie Bennet	"I'm Outta Love" (Anastacia)	Safe

==== Live Show 4 (29 March 2009) ====
Theme: Best of South Africa

Order	Artist	Song (original artists)	Result
1	Sasha-Lee Davids	"Destiny" (Malaika)	Safe
2	Pixie Bennet	"Quick Quick" (MarcAlex)	Eliminated
3	Lendel Moonsamy	"Weeping" (Bright Blue)	Bottom two
4	Thembi Nkosi	"Ndihamba Nawe" (Mafikizolo)	Safe
5	Jason Hartman	"Great Heart" (Johnny Clegg)	Safe
6	Graeme Watkins	"Another Universe" (Arno Carstens)	Safe
7	Cameron Bruce	"Treasure" (Tree63)	Bottom three

==== Live Show 5 (5 April 2009) ====
Theme: Rock Classics

Order	Artist	First song (original artists)	Second song	Result
1	Thembi Nkosi	"Going Under" (Evanescence)	"When You're Gone" (Avril Lavigne)	Safe
2	Cameron Bruce	"Love the One You're With" (Stephen Stills)	"Free Fallin'" (Tom Petty)	Eliminated
3	Lendel Moonsamy	"Feel Like Makin' Love" (Bad Company)	"Here Without You" (3 Doors Down)	Bottom two
4	Sasha-Lee Davids	"Mamma Mia" (ABBA)	"Because of You" (Kelly Clarkson)	Safe
5	Graeme Watkins	"Always" (Bon Jovi)	"Sweet Child o' Mine" (Guns N' Roses)	Safe
6	Jason Hartman	"Lightning Crashes" (Live)	"Hanging by a Moment" (Lifehouse)	Safe

==== Live Show 6 (12 April 2009) ====
Theme: DJ's Choice

Order	Artist	First song (original artists)	Second song	Result
1	Sasha-Lee Davids	"Bleeding Love" (Leona Lewis)	"Angels" (Robbie Williams)	Safe
2	Jason Hartman	"The Living Years" (Mike + The Mechanics)	"Signed, Sealed, Delivered I'm Yours" (Stevie Wonder)	Safe
3	Graeme Watkins	"The Man Who Can't Be Moved" (The Script)	"Loslappie" (Kurt Darren)	Safe
4	Lendel Moonsamy	"Sunday Morning" (Maroon 5)	"7 Days" (Craig David)	Bottom two
5	Thembi Nkosi	"Weekend Special" (Brenda Fassie)	"No One" (Alicia Keys)	Eliminated

==== Live Show 7 (19 April 2009) ====
Theme: Unplugged

Order	Artist	First song (original artists)	Second song	Result
1	Jason Hartman	"One" (U2)	"(Everything I Do) I Do It for You" (Bryan Adams)	Safe
2	Sasha-Lee Davids	"8th World Wonder" (Kimberley Locke)	"Apologize" (OneRepublic)	Safe
3	Graeme Watkins	"Sex on Fire" (Kings of Leon)	"What's Up" (4 Non Blondes)	Bottom two
4	Lendel Moonsamy	"Redemption Song" (Bob Marley)	"Save Tonight" (Eagle-Eye Cherry)	Eliminated

==== Live Show 8: Semi-final (26 April 2009) ====
Theme: Choices

Order	Artist	First song (original artists)	Second song	Third song	Result
1	Sasha-Lee Davids	"Listen" (Beyoncé)	"I Believe" (Yolanda Adams)	"Spotlight" (Jennifer Hudson)	Safe
2	Jason Hartman	"Hey Jude" (The Beatles)	"Kiss from a Rose" (Seal)	"Summer Love" (Justin Timberlake)	Safe
3	Graeme Watkins	"Every Car You Chase" (Party Ben)	"She Always Gets What She Wants" (Prime Circle)	"Song 2" (Blur)	Eliminated

==== Live final (3 May 2009) ====
Artist	First song	Second song	Third song	Result
Jason Hartman	"Great Heart"	"With a Little Help from My Friends"	"Break the Silence"	Runner-up
Sasha-Lee Davids	"Bleeding Love"	"Mamma Mia"	"True Believer"	Winner
