= Idols South Africa season 4 =

Idols South Africa
- Season 4
- Hosted by: Colin Moss
- Judges: Dave Thompson; Mara Louw; Gareth Cliff; Randall Abrahams
- Winner: Jody Williams
- Runner-up: Andriëtte Norman
- Finals venue: Ellis Park Stadium

Release
- Original network: M-net
- Original release: 19 August – 9 December 2007

Season chronology
- ← Previous; Season 3 Next → Season 5

Idols South Africa IV is the fourth season of South African reality television series Idols South Africa. Idols South Africa is a competitive talent show based on Pop Idol in the United Kingdom. Idols South Africa IV premiered in September 2007 after a one-year hiatus.

The judging panel remained the same for the third season in a row; Colin Moss returned for what was to be his final season. As in previous seasons, each performer's score is an aggregate of the audience's votes (51%) and the judges' votes (49%).

The winner was 17-year-old Jody Williams, who bested Andriëtte Norman on 9 December 2007, at Ellis Park Stadium in Williams' hometown of Johannesburg. Williams was the youngest winner of the show to date, and she was the third consecutive woman to be named "SA Idol". Her winning song was a cover of "Love Is All Around" by Swedish singer Agnes Carlsson. (Carlsson was previously named the winner of Sweden's Idol 2005.)

== Finals ==
=== Finalists ===
Ages are as stated in the contest.

Contestant	Age	Hometown	Outcome
Jody Williams	17	Cape Town	Won on 9 December 2007
Andriëtte Norman	20	Brackenfell	Eliminated on 9 December 2007
Munro du Toit	26	Cape Town	Eliminated on 3 December 2007
Tender Mavundla	25	Port Shepstone	Eliminated on 26 November 2007
Daniel Büys	22	Bryanston	Eliminated on 19 November 2007
Björn Blignaut	26	Radiokop	Eliminated on 12 November 2007
Carla Louw	20	Pretoria	Eliminated on 5 November 2007
Joel Mabuso Mogale	17	Johannesburg	Eliminated on 29 October 2007
Caroline Barole	23	Gauteng	Eliminated on 22 October 2007
Dominic Momberg	20	KwaZulu-Natal	Eliminated on 15 October 2007

=== Themes ===
- 15 October: Songs from the last Century
- 22 October: Crooners and Divas
- 29 October: Rock
- 5 November: Best of South Africa
- 12 November: New Millennium Magic
- 19 November: Seasons and Colours
- 26 November: My Idols
- 3 December: Judges Choice
- 10 December: Grand Finale

== Elimination chart ==
The first four weeks are the semi-finals, followed by nine weeks of finals.

Place	Contestant	Result for the week												
Place	Contestant	09/24	09/26	10/01	10/08	10/15	10/22	10/29	11/05	11/12	11/19	11/26	12/03	12/10
1	Jody Williams	Did not perform	Safe	Safe	Safe	Safe	Safe	Safe	Safe	Safe	Safe	Safe	Safe	Winner
2	Andriëtte Norman	Did not perform	Safe	Safe	Safe	Safe	Safe	Safe	Safe	Safe	Safe	Bottom 2	Safe	Runner-up
3	Munro du Toit	Safe	Did not perform	Safe	Bottom 4	Safe	Safe	Bottom 3	Safe	Safe	Safe	Safe	Eliminated	
4	Tender Mavundla	Did not perform	Safe	Bottom 4	Safe	Safe	Safe	Safe	Safe	Bottom 2	Bottom 2	Eliminated		
5	Daniel Büys	Safe	Did not perform	Safe	Safe	Safe	Bottom 3	Safe	Bottom 3	Bottom 3	Eliminated			
6	Björn Blignaut	Safe	Did not perform	Safe	Safe	Safe	Safe	Safe	Bottom 2	Eliminated				
7	Carla Louw	Did not perform	Safe	Safe	Safe	Bottom 3	Safe	Bottom 2	Eliminated					
8	Yolanda Nabo	Did not perform	Safe	Safe	Safe	Bottom 2	Bottom 2	Eliminated						
9	Caroline Borole	Did not perform	Safe	Safe	Safe	Safe	Eliminated							
10	Dominic Momberg	Safe	Did not perform	Safe	Bottom 3	Eliminated								
11–12	PJ Simeoni	Safe	Did not perform	Bottom 3	Eliminated									
11–12	Sabelo Mthembu	Safe	Did not perform	Safe	Eliminated									
13–14	Nicky Burger	Did not perform	Safe	Eliminated										
13–14	Jarred De Kock	Safe	Did not perform	Eliminated										
15–23 (semi)	Belinda Cherry	Did not perform	Eliminated											
15–23 (semi)	Dominique Burger	Did not perform	Eliminated											
15–23 (semi)	Duduzile Ndlovu	Did not perform	Eliminated											
15–23 (semi)	Heidi Boyssen	Did not perform	Eliminated											
15–23 (semi)	Jackoleen Aasvoel	Did not perform	Eliminated											
15–23 (semi)	Lucky Linksteen	Eliminated												
15–23 (semi)	Peter Llewellyn Moss	Eliminated												
15–23 (semi)	Richard Hala	Eliminated												
15–23 (semi)	Rob Warren	Eliminated												
24	Richard Mtsweni	Withdrew												

=== Live show details ===
==== Heat 1: Top 12 boys (16 September 2007) ====
Order	Artist	Song (original artists)	Result
—N/a	Richard Mtsweni	—N/a	Withdrew
1	Dominic Momberg	"Footloose" (Kenny Loggins)	Safe
2	Peter Llewellyn Moss	"Remember When It Rained" (Josh Groban)	Eliminated
3	Sabelo Mthembu	"Kiss from a Rose" (Seal)	Safe
4	PJ Simeoni	"Beautiful Soul" (Jesse McCartney)	Safe
5	Jarred De Kock	"Sway" (Dean Martin)	Safe
6	Richard Hala	"Hotel California" (Eagles)	Eliminated
7	Rob Warren	"One" (U2)	Eliminated
8	Munro du Toit	"Sugar Man" (Just Jinger)	Safe
9	Daniel Büys	"Your Body Is a Wonderland" (John Mayer)	Safe
10	Björn Blignaut	"Wonderful World" (James Morrison)	Safe
11	Lucky Linksteen	"Crazy Little Thing Called Love" (Queen)	Eliminated

==== Heat 2: Top 12 girls (23 September 2007) ====
Order	Artist	Song (original artists)	Result
1	Heidi Boyssen	"I'm Holdin' On to Love (To Save My Life)" (Shania Twain)	Eliminated
2	Duduzile Ndlovu	"Waterloo" (ABBA)	Eliminated
3	Nicky Burger	"Candyman" (Christina Aguilera)	Safe
4	Yolanda Nabo	"Put Your Records On" (Corinne Bailey Rae)	Safe
5	Liza Bronner	"Total Eclipse of the Heart" (Bonnie Tyler)	Eliminated
6	Belinda Cherry	"Brass in Pocket" (The Pretenders)	Eliminated
7	Tender Mavundla	"Careless Whisper" (George Michael)	Safe
8	Jackoleen Aasvoel	"Can't Give Up Now" (Mary Mary)	Eliminated
9	Jody Williams	"The Greatest Reward" (Celine Dion)	Safe
10	Carla Louw	"L-O-V-E" (Nat King Cole)	Safe
11	Caroline Borole	"Listen" (Beyoncé)	Safe
12	Andriëtte Norman	"Love the One You're With" (Stephen Stills)	Safe

==== Heat 3: Top 14 (30 September 2007) ====
Order	Artist	Song (original artists)	Result
1	Yolanda Nabo	"Walk Away" (Kelly Clarkson)	Safe
2	Dominic Momberg	"What's Left of Me" (Nick Lachey)	Safe
3	Tender Mavundla	"The Weakness in Me" (Keisha White)	Bottom four
4	Nicky Burger	"Unfaithful" (Rihanna)	Eliminated
5	PJ Simeoni	"Everything" (Michael Bublé)	Bottom three
6	Andriëtte Norman	"Songbird" (Eva Cassidy)	Safe
7	Jarred De Kock	"This Love" (Maroon 5)	Eliminated
8	Caroline Borole	"Feeling Good" (Nina Simone)	Safe
9	Daniel Büys	"Faith" (George Michael)	Safe
10	Sabelo Mthembu	"Superstition" (Stevie Wonder)	Safe
11	Jody Williams	"Run to You" (Whitney Houston)	Safe
12	Munro du Toit	"Wicked Game" (Chris Isaak)	Safe
13	Carla Louw	"99 Red Balloons" (Nena)	Safe
14	Björn Blignaut	"It's My Life" (Bon Jovi)	Safe

==== Heat 4 – Top 12 (7 October 2007) ====
Order	Artist	Song (original artists)	Result
1	Carla Louw	"Don't Speak" (No Doubt)	Safe
2	Jody Williams	"I Wanna Dance with Somebody (Who Loves Me)" (Whitney Houston)	Safe
3	Björn Blignaut	"I Swear" (All-4-One)	Safe
4	Andriëtte Norman	"Have You Ever Really Loved a Woman?" (Bryan Adams)	Safe
5	Daniel Büys	"Fever" (Peggy Lee)	Safe
6	PJ Simeoni	"Fly Me to the Moon" (Frank Sinatra)	Eliminated
7	Yolanda Nabo	"Reach" (Gloria Estefan)	Safe
8	Sabelo Mthembu	"Yesterday" (The Beatles)	Eliminated
9	Dominic Momberg	"Walking Away" (Craig David)	Bottom three
10	Tender Mavundla	"Another Sad Love Song" (Toni Braxton)	Safe
11	Caroline Borole	"Show Me Heaven" (Maria McKee)	Safe
12	Munro du Toit	"Mustang Sally" (Wilson Pickett)	Bottom four

==== Live show 1: Songs from the Last Century (14 October 2007) ====
Order	Artist	Song (original artists)	Result
1	Munro du Toit	"Smooth" (Santana & Rob Thomas)	Safe
2	Yolanda Nabo	"This Kiss" (Faith Hill)	Bottom two
3	Daniel Büys	"Big Yellow Taxi" (Joni Mitchell)	Safe
4	Tender Mavundla	"Show Me Love" (Robin S.)	Safe
5	Dominic Momberg	"Summer of '69" (Bryan Adams)	Eliminated
6	Andriëtte Norman	"Declaration of Love" (Celine Dion)	Safe
7	Caroline Borole	"Gloria" (Laura Branigan)	Safe
8	Björn Blignaut	"I Heard It Through the Grapevine" (Marvin Gaye)	Safe
9	Carla Louw	"Walking on Sunshine" (Katrina and the Waves)	Bottom three
10	Jody Williams	"The Best" (Tina Turner)	Safe

==== Live show 2: Crooners and Divas (21 October 2007) ====
Order	Artist	Song (original artists)	Result
1	Yolanda Nabo	"Say My Name" (Destiny's Child)	Bottom two
2	Björn Blignaut	"Have I Told You Lately" (Van Morrison)	Safe
3	Andriëtte Norman	"Said I Loved You...But I Lied" (Michael Bolton)	Safe
4	Carla Louw	"Will You Love Me Tomorrow" (The Shirelles)	Safe
5	Daniel Büys	"Old Devil Moon" (Jamie Cullum)	Bottom three
6	Munro du Toit	"Sweet Caroline" (Neil Diamond)	Safe
7	Jody Williams	"Over and Over" (Puff Johnson)	Safe
8	Caroline Borole	"Anytime You Need a Friend" (Mariah Carey)	Eliminated
9	Tender Mavundla	"Shackles (Praise You)" (Mary Mary)	Safe

==== Live show 3: Rock (28 October 2007) ====
Order	Artist	Song (original artists)	Result
1	Björn Blignaut	"Eye of the Tiger" (Survivor)	Safe
2	Tender Mavundla	"Anytime" (Kelly Clarkson)	Safe
3	Yolanda Nabo	"Sk8er Boi" (Avril Lavigne)	Eliminated
4	Daniel Büys	"Somebody to Love" (Queen)	Safe
5	Jody Williams	"Behind These Hazel Eyes" (Kelly Clarkson)	Safe
6	Munro du Toit	"The One I Love" (R.E.M.)	Bottom three
7	Carla Louw	"Piece of My Heart" (Janis Joplin)	Bottom two
8	Andriëtte Norman	"I'm Outta Love" (Anastacia)	Safe

==== Live show 4: Best of South Africa (4 November 2007) ====
Order	Artist	Song (original artists)	Result
1	Carla Louw	"Special Star" (Mango Groove)	Eliminated
2	Jody Williams	"Secrets" (Jamali)	Safe
3	Tender Mavundla	"Vul'indlela" (Brenda Fassie)	Safe
4	Andriëtte Norman	"African Dream" (Vicky Sampson)	Safe
5	Björn Blignaut	"Sondela" (Ringo Madlingozi)	Bottom two
6	Daniel Büys	"What He Means" (Just Jinjer)	Bottom three
7	Munro du Toit	"Hello" (Prime Circle)	Safe

==== Live show 5: New Millennium Magic (11 November 2007) ====
Order	Artist	First song (original artists)	Second song	Result
1	Jody Williams	"I Don't Need a Man" (The Pussycat Dolls)	"Heaven" (Bryan Adams)	Safe
2	Tender Mavundla	"Umbrella" (Rihanna)	"Irreplaceable" (Beyoncé)	Bottom two
3	Björn Blignaut	"Beautiful Girls" (Sean Kingston)	"If There's Any Justice" (Lemar)	Eliminated
4	Daniel Büys	"Waiting on the World to Change" (John Mayer)	"Makes Me Wonder" (Maroon 5)	Bottom three
5	Andriëtte Norman	"Other Side of the World" (KT Tunstall)	"Who Knew" (Pink)	Safe
6	Munro du Toit	"Chasing Cars" (Snow Patrol)	"How You Remind Me" (Nickelback)	Safe

==== Live show 6: Seasons and Colours (18 November 2007) ====
Order	Artist	First song (original artists)	Second song	Result
1	Munro du Toit	"Paradise in Summertime" (Just Jinjer)	"Behind Blue Eyes" (Limp Bizkit)	Safe
2	Jody Williams	"Black or White" (Michael Jackson)	"The Colour of My Love" (Celine Dion)	Safe
3	Tender Mavundla	"True Colors" (Cyndi Lauper)	"GoldenEye" (Tina Turner)	Bottom two
4	Daniel Büys	"Brown Eyed Girl" (Van Morrison)	"Yellow" (Coldplay)	Eliminated
5	Andriëtte Norman	"I Guess That's Why They Call It the Blues" (Elton John)	"Black Velvet" (Alannah Myles)	Safe

==== Live show 7: My Idols (25 November 2007) ====
Order	Artist	First song (original artists)	Second song	Result
1	Tender Mavundla	"I'm Every Woman" (Chaka Khan)	"Stranger in My House" (Tamia)	Eliminated
2	Munro du Toit	"Have You Ever Seen the Rain?" (Creedence Clearwater Revival)	"Kryptonite" (3 Doors Down)	Safe
3	Jody Williams	"I Surrender" (Celine Dion)	"Hurt" (Christina Aguilera)	Safe
4	Andriëtte Norman	"Honesty" (Billy Joel)	"Left Outside Alone" (Anastacia)	Bottom 2

==== Live show 8: Choices (2 December 2007) ====
Order	Artist	First song (original artists)	Second song	Third song	Result
1	Andriëtte Norman	"Over the Rainbow" (Eva Cassidy)	"Walking in Memphis" (Cher)	"Loving Arms" (Dixie Chicks)	Safe
2	Jody Williams	"On the Wings of Love" (Jeffrey Osborne)	"Ain't No Other Man" (Christina Aguilera)	"Dance with My Father" (Luther Vandross)	Safe
3	Munro du Toit	"Tears in Heaven" (Eric Clapton)	"Hey There Delilah" (Plain White T's)	"Born to Be Wild" (Steppenwolf)	Eliminated

==== Live final (9 December 2007) ====
Artist	First song	Second song	Third song	Result
Andriëtte Norman	"Black Velvet"	"I'm Outta Love"	"Love Is All Around"	Runner-up
Jody Williams	"I Wanna Dance with Somebody (Who Loves Me)"	"Run to You"	"Love Is All Around"	Won
