= Bosmansdam High School =

Public English & Afrikaans medium co-educational high school in Bothasig, Cape Town

Coordinates: 33°51′33″S 18°32′02″E

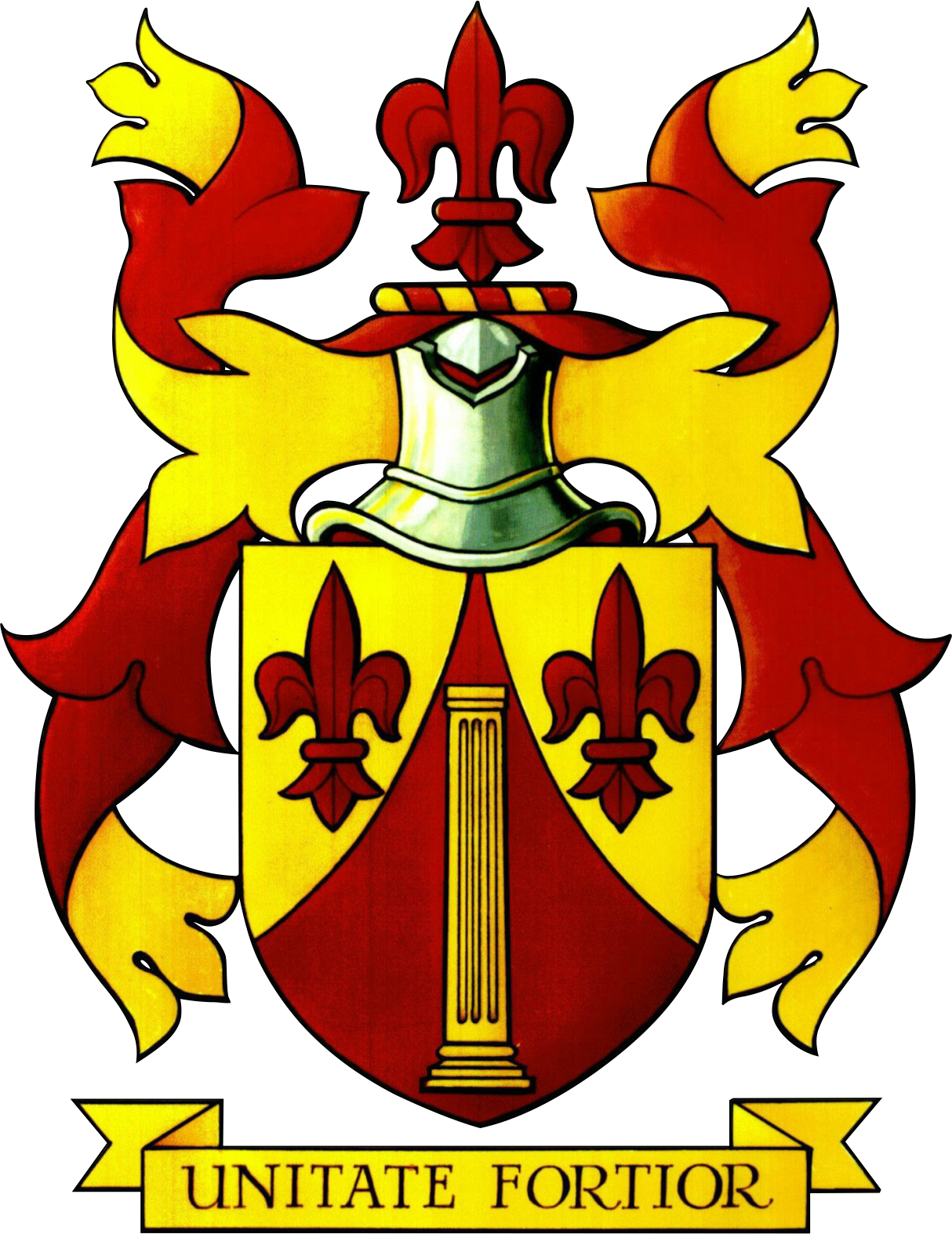
- Bosmansdam High School Emblem

Location
- Adam Tas Avenue, Bothasig, Cape Town, Western Cape, South Africa, 7441

Information
- Motto: Unitate Fortior (Stronger through Unity)
- Established: 17 March 1971
- Headmaster: Mr. D.Dirks
- Gender: Co-Ed
- Enrollment: +-900
- Houses: Red, White, Blue, Yellow
- Colours: Dark blue, red & gold
- Slogan: Honesty, Respect, Loyalty, Responsibility
- Nickname: Bosmansdam Knights
- Website: http://www.bosmansdam.co.za/

Bosmansdam High School (Afrikaans: Hoërskool Bosmansdam) is a public English and Afrikaans co-educational high school. It was founded in 1971 in Bothasig, a suburb of Cape Town. The school is state assisted and charges new students a set amount of money for its services. The school offers a variety of sporting and cultural activities for its students in addition to its academic program.

== Academics ==
Bosmansdam High School provides a range of academic subjects typical of the South African national curriculum. They are a dual-language institution where English and Afrikaans are the primary languages of instruction.

== Notable alumni ==
- James Vos, Member of Parliament for the Democratic Alliance and Shadow Minister for Tourism.
- Jody Williams, winner of the fourth season of South African Idols in 2007.
