= Lize Heerman =

South African singer-songwriter

Lizé Heerman is a South African-born singer-songwriter, Supersport presenter, radio DJ and a finalist of the fifth season Idols South Africa. She currently lives in Australia, and recently appeared as a contestant on The Voice.

== Early life ==
Lizé Heerman was born in Klerksdorp, South Africa. She grew up in Durban, South Africa. Her junior school started in Johannesburg until her family relocated to Durban where she attended school at Crawford College La Lucia. She excelled at running and cycling. At age 11 she was placed first overall in her age group in the Cape Argus Pick'n Pay Cycle Tour. Heerman attended the University of KwaZulu-Natal, Durban, South Africa and attained a Bachelor of Laws degree.

== Career ==
At 16, Heerman signed her first recording contract with David Gresham Records, South Africa. However, she did not release an album. At 21 years of age she entered South African Idols and landed herself a finalist position. She was placed eighth overall.

Immediately after her Idols departure, Heerman was scouted by Mnet television producers and began presenting for SuperSport. She presented inserts for Let's Play – a show focusing on promoting sports in underprivileged communities and SuperSport's corporate social investment initiative. During her time with Let's Play she covered events such as Nelson Mandela's birthday. In 2009, Heerman co-presented Sports Illustrated magazine's Ruff Stuff with Daren Scott at Sun City.

In June 2009, Heerman and Daniel Baron were the curtain raiser performers for the Lions vs British Lions rugby game played at Ellis Park's 62,000-seat stadium. Lizé performed a rendition of Peggy Lee's "Fever".

In 2009, Heerman was given a solo slot on Jacaranda FM in Johannesburg. The three-hour show featured the latest hits as well as current affairs. In 2010 she was invited to be a guest artist on Idols Season 6 where she performed her debut single, "Do You Love Me?". In 2010 it which went to no.1 on the East Coast Radio chart. "Do You Love Me?" stayed at no.1 for eight weeks on East Coast Radio. It was written by Bob Ezrin, Paul Stanley and Kim Fowley and published through Universal Music Publishing Group, Kobalt Music Publishing Ltd. In 2011 Heerman and Jason Hartman, winner of 5 Idols (South Africa), were invited by the Royal Family of Monaco members; Albert II, Prince of Monaco and Charlene Wittstock to perform at their private residence 'Roc-Agel'.

In 2011, Heerman released her second single, "Someone New", which received radio play country wide. "Someone New" did not chart in South Africa and received mixed reviews. Later in 2011, Heerman joined the Durban Philharmonic Orchestra for the Christmas Festival Concert at the Durban Botanical Gardens.

In 2012, Heerman relocated from South Africa to Australia. A sold out performance at Perth Ellington Jazz Club achieved her media coverage in Australia. She featured in the 2012 Telethon show, performing a rendition of "Crazy". The Telethon raised a record-breaking $16,805,622 for Princess Margret children's hospital and featured Elton John as the headlining act.

In May 2012, Heerman featured on Daniel Barron's track, "See Thru". The single went to no.1 on Highveld Stereo 94.7. In 2013, Baron and Heerman were invited to perform "See Thru" as part of the opening act for Bon Jovi's "Because We Can" world tour, in Johannesburg at the Coca-Cola Stadium.

In June 2013, the South African Tourism Board invited Heerman to perform the official tribute song for Nelson Mandela's 95th birthday in Sydney, Australia.

== Charity ==
Heerman has been linked to charities such as Wish for a Dream and CHOC. She co-hosted a CHOC event, at Gateway, Durban, which featured various fund raising initiatives that included an auction. In September 2011, Heerman founded Singing for Somalia. The foundation's aim was to support persons starving in Somalia. A fundraiser was held in September 2011. Performers at the event included Aaron McIlroy, Heerman and Guy Buttery and Nibs van der Spuy. The evening was well- attended and through tickets, donations and auctions around R60,000 (ZAR) was raised which was sent to Gift of the Givers who used the funds to feed starving families in Somalia.
