= Back to Basics (The Temptations album) =

Studio album by The Temptations
- Released: October 1983
- Recorded: 1983
- Studio: Hitsville U.S.A. Recording Studios, Los Angeles, California, United States; Ritesonian Studio, Van Nuys, Los Angeles, California, United States ("Hollywood")
- Genre: Soul
- Length: 41:27
- Language: English
- Label: Motown
- Producer: Angelo Bond; Berry Gordy; Harvey Fuqua; Willie Hutch; Norman Whitfield

The Temptations chronology
Surface Thrills (1983)	Back to Basics (1983)	Truly for You (1984)

Back to Basics is the second of two studio albums released by American soul group The Temptations in 1983. The album saw the group reunited with former producer Norman Whitfield, and would also be the first to feature Ron Tyson as first tenor, who would eventually become the second-longest serving member in the group’s history. It would also be the last studio album with longtime frontman Dennis Edwards before his second departure and the first appearance of Edwards’ successor Ali-Ollie Woodson.

== Recording ==
The Temptations had briefly left their long-time home of Motown for Atlantic Records in the late 1970s, but the two studio albums they released there were not successful and Atlantic released them from their contract. The band returned to Motown in the early 1980s and still struggled to be commercially viable, so they returned to record producer Norman Whitfield, who had recorded several of the band's hits in the 1960s for this album. The group performed at the Motown 25 anniversary concert and then immediately went to the studio for these sessions, but experienced problems with Dennis Edwards being unreliable due to partying and drug abuse. To compensate, the group brought in Ali-Ollie Woodson, who filled in for Edwards on one track ("Stop the World Right Here (I Wanna Get Off)"). Woodson would officially replace Edwards in The Temptations the following year (1984). Former member Glenn Leonard is featured on "Isn't The Night Fantastic" (originally from their Power album).

== Reception ==
Editors at AllMusic Guide scored this album 2.5 out of five stars, with reviewer Jason Elias writing that "what's here is worth listening to" for the Norman Whitfield-produced tracks.

== Track listing ==
Back to Basics track listing
No.	Title	Writer(s)	Lead singer(s)	Length
1.	"Miss Busy Body (Get Our Body Busy)"	Norman Whitfield, Angelo Bond	Dennis Edwards, Melvin Franklin	4:48
2.	"Sail Away"	Whitfield, Bond	Ron Tyson	5:05
3.	"Outlaw"	Whitfield, Bond	Richard Street, Tyson	4:36
4.	"Stop the World Right Here (I Wanna Get Off)"	Whitfield, Bond	Ali-Ollie Woodson	5:25
5.	"The Battle Song (I'm the One)"	Willie Hutch, Berry Gordy	Edwards, Tyson, Franklin, Levi Stubbs	5:21
6.	"Hollywood"	Otis Williams, Tyson, Victor Castarphen, David English	Tyson, Edwards	3:59
7.	"Isn't the Night Fantastic"	Edwards, English, Glenn Leonard, Street, Williams	Street	4:59
8.	"Make Me Believe in Love Again"	Whitfield, Bond	Tyson	6:12

== Personnel ==
The Temptations

- Dennis Edwards – tenor/baritone vocals except for “Stop the World”
- Melvin Franklin – bass vocals
- Glenn Leonard – first tenor/falsetto vocals on “Isn’t the Night Fantastic”
- Richard Street – second tenor vocals
- Ron Tyson – first tenor/falsetto vocals
- Otis Williams – second tenor/baritone vocals
- Ali-Ollie Woodson – tenor vocals on “Stop the World”

Additional musicians

- Billy Bass – bass guitar on "Miss Busy Body (Get Our Body Busy)", "Sail Away", "Outlaw", "Stop the World Right Here (I Wanna Get Off)", and "Make Me Believe in Love Again"
- Eddie "Bongo" Brown – percussion on "The Battle Song (I'm the One)" and "Isn't the Night Fantastic"
- Reginald "Sonny" Burke – keyboards on "Isn't the Night Fantastic"
- Vic Carstarphen – piano on "Hollywood", Prophet 10 and Jupiter 6 synthesizers on "Hollywood"
- David Stephen Cochrane – bass guitar on "Miss Busy Body (Get Our Body Busy)", "Sail Away", "Outlaw", "Stop the World Right Here (I Wanna Get Off)", and "Make Me Believe in Love Again"
- Walter Downing – keyboards on "Miss Busy Body (Get Our Body Busy)", "Sail Away", "Outlaw", "Stop the World Right Here (I Wanna Get Off)", and "Make Me Believe in Love Again"
- The Four Tops – vocals on "The Battle Song (I'm the One)"
  - Renaldo “Obie” Benson
  - Abdul "Duke" Fakir
  - Lawrence Payton
  - Levi Stubbs
- James Gadson – drums on "Isn't the Night Fantastic"
- Paul Jackson Jr. – guitar on "Isn't the Night Fantastic"
- Norman Harris – guitar on "Hollywood"
- Willie Hutch – electronic drums on "The Battle Song (I'm the One)", rhythm arrangement on "The Battle Song (I'm the One)", production on "The Battle Song (I'm the One)"
- James Jamerson, Jr. – bass guitar on "Hollywood"
- David Kitay – guitar on "The Battle Song (I'm the One)"
- Richard Kosinski – keyboards on "The Battle Song (I'm the One)"
- Marvin Marshall – guitar on "Hollywood"
- Terral Santiel – percussion on "Miss Busy Body (Get Our Body Busy)", "Sail Away", "Outlaw", "Stop the World Right Here (I Wanna Get Off)", and "Make Me Believe in Love Again"
- Gary "Funk Doctor" Thompson – guitar on "Miss Busy Body (Get Our Body Busy)", "Sail Away", "Outlaw", "Stop the World Right Here (I Wanna Get Off)", and "Make Me Believe in Love Again"
- Jerry Blaze Thompson – drums on "Miss Busy Body (Get Our Body Busy)", "Sail Away", "Outlaw", "Stop the World Right Here (I Wanna Get Off)", and "Make Me Believe in Love Again"
- Earl Van Dyke – keyboards on "Isn't the Night Fantastic"
- David T. Walker – guitar on "Isn't the Night Fantastic"
- "Ready" Freddie Washington – bass guitar on "The Battle Song (I'm the One)" and "Isn't the Night Fantastic"
- Norman Whitfield – rhythm arrangements, production, mix on "Miss Busy Body (Get Our Body Busy)", "Sail Away", "Outlaw", "Stop the World Right Here (I Wanna Get Off)", and "Make Me Believe in Love Again"
- Norman Anthony Whitfield: dx programming, recording and mix on "Miss Busy Body (Get Our Body Busy)", "Sail Away", "Outlaw", "Stop the World Right Here (I Wanna Get Off)", and "Make Me Believe in Love Again", rhythm arrangement and production on "Sail Away" (according to 7" credits)
- Eddie Willis – guitar on "Miss Busy Body (Get Our Body Busy)", "Sail Away", "Outlaw", "Stop the World Right Here (I Wanna Get Off)", and "Make Me Believe in Love Again"
- Benjamin F. Wright, Jr. – electronic drums on "Hollywood", vocal arrangement on "Hollywood", recording on "Hollywood"

Technical personnel

- Angelo Bond – production on "Isn't the Night Fantastic"
- David Stephen Cochrane – synthesizer on "Miss Busy Body (Get Our Body Busy)", "Sail Away", "Outlaw", "Stop the World Right Here (I Wanna Get Off)", and "Make Me Believe in Love Again"
- Andy Engel – design
- Harvey Fuqua – production on "Hollywood"
- Berry Gordy – production on "Isn't the Night Fantastic", executive production on "Isn't the Night Fantastic"
- McKinley Jackson – arrangement on "Isn't the Night Fantastic"
- Leonard Jackson – engineering on "Miss Busy Body (Get Our Body Busy)", "Sail Away", "Outlaw", "Stop the World Right Here (I Wanna Get Off)", and "Make Me Believe in Love Again"
- Robert Franklin Justice – vocoder on "Miss Busy Body (Get Our Body Busy)", "Sail Away", "Outlaw", "Stop the World Right Here (I Wanna Get Off)", and "Make Me Believe in Love Again"
- McKinley Jackson – rhythm arrangement on "Isn't the Night Fantastic"
- Harry Kim – horn arrangement on "Hollywood"
- Johnny Lee – art direction
- John Matousek – mastering
- Bruce Miller – orchestration on "Miss Busy Body (Get Our Body Busy)", "Sail Away", "Outlaw", "Stop the World Right Here (I Wanna Get Off)", and "Make Me Believe in Love Again"
- Gene Page – string arrangement on "The Battle Song (I'm the One)"
- Barney Perkins – recording on "Hollywood" and "Isn't the Night Fantastic"
- Paul Riser – horn arrangement on "Isn't the Night Fantastic", string arrangement on "Isn't the Night Fantastic"
- Sylvester Rivers – synthesizer on "The Battle Song (I'm the One)"
- Bob Robitaille – engineering on "Miss Busy Body (Get Our Body Busy)", "Sail Away", "Outlaw", "Stop the World Right Here (I Wanna Get Off)", and "Make Me Believe in Love Again"; recording on "Isn't the Night Fantastic"
- Steve Smith – engineering on "Miss Busy Body (Get Our Body Busy)", "Sail Away", "Outlaw", "Stop the World Right Here (I Wanna Get Off)", and "Make Me Believe in Love Again"; recording on "The Battle Song (I'm the One)"
- Ralph Sutton – engineering on "Miss Busy Body (Get Our Body Busy)", "Sail Away", "Outlaw", "Stop the World Right Here (I Wanna Get Off)", and "Make Me Believe in Love Again"
- Russ "The Mix King" Terrana – mixing
- Philip Walters – recording on "Miss Busy Body (Get Our Body Busy)", "Sail Away", "Outlaw", "Stop the World Right Here (I Wanna Get Off)", and "Make Me Believe in Love Again"
- Ty Williams – recording on "Hollywood"
- Benjamin F. Wright, Jr. – horn arrangement on "The Battle Song (I'm the One)"
- Roxanna Gordy Wright – album coordination

== Chart performance ==
Back to Basics spent nine weeks on the Billboard 200, peaking at 152 on June 9, 1984, and spent 30 weeks on the Billboard Top R&B/Hip Hop Albums (then named the Black LP's) chart, peaking at 30th place on June 16, 1984.

== See also ==
- List of 1983 albums
