= Truly for You =

Studio album by the Temptations
- Released: October 15, 1984
- Recorded: April–August 1984
- Studios: Yamaha International Recording (Glendale, California); The Lighthouse (North Hollywood, California); Sound Castle Recorders (Los Angeles, California)
- Genres: Electropop; R&B; soul
- Length: 39:02
- Label: Gordy
- Producers: Ralph Johnson; Al McKay

The Temptations chronology
Back to Basics (1983)	Truly for You (1984)	Touch Me (1985)

Professional ratings
Review scores
Source	Rating
AllMusic	3/5 stars
The Boston Globe	(favourable)
Gannett	(favourable)
The Morning Call	(favourable)
The Philadelphia Inquirer	3/4 stars
Record Mirror	3.5/5 stars

Truly for You is an album by American R&B vocal group the Temptations, released on October 15, 1984, by Gordy Records. The album reached No. 3 on the US Billboard Top R&B/Hip-Hop Albums chart and No. 25 on the New Zealand Pop Albums chart.

== Overview ==
This was the first full Temptations album to feature Ali-Ollie Woodson (credited simply as "Ollie Woodson"), who joined the group in 1983, replacing Dennis Edwards. The album was produced by Al McKay and Ralph Johnson of Earth, Wind & Fire. Included on the album are the R&B hit singles "Treat Her Like a Lady", "My Love Is True (Truly For You)", and "How Can You Say That It's Over".

== Critical reception ==
Craig Lytle of Allmusic wrote, "The album that preceded this one (Back to Basics) introduced the group's new falsetto lead, Ron Tyson, who is also a remarkable tenor. To fill the departure of Dennis Edwards, this release introduces the electrifying vocals of Ali Ollie Woodson. As talented, competitive and competent as Edwards is, Woodson's sound is not only refreshing to fans of the Tempts, but to the music industry overall."

== Track listing ==
All selections produced, arranged, and conducted by Al McKay and Ralph Johnson.

Side one
No.	Title	Writer(s)	Lead singer(s)	Length
1.	"Running"	Phillip Ingram, Zane Giles, Tony Haynes	Ali-Ollie Woodson	3:28
2.	"Treat Her Like a Lady"	Otis Williams, Woodson	Woodson	4:40
3.	"How Can You Say That It's Over"	Tom Keane, Mike Himelstein	Ron Tyson, Woodson	6:05
4.	"My Love is True (Truly for You)"	Williams, Tyson, Victor Carstarphen	Tyson, Williams	6:08

Side two
No.	Title	Writer(s)	Lead singer(s)	Length
1.	"Memories"	Don Freeman, David Batteau	Woodson	4:39
2.	"Just to Keep You in My Life"	William Durham, Lorrin Bates	Tyson	4:23
3.	"Set Your Love Right"	Ron Tyson, Victor Carstarphen	Woodson	5:09
4.	"I'll Keep My Light in My Window"	Terri McFaddin, Leonard Caston	Richard Street	4:30

== Personnel ==
The Temptations

- Melvin Franklin – vocals (bass)
- Richard Street – vocals (second tenor)
- Ron Tyson – vocals (first tenor and falsetto)
- Otis Williams – vocals (second tenor and baritone)
- Ali-Ollie Woodson – vocals (tenor and baritone), synthesizers, programming

Musicians

- Michael Boddicker – synthesizers, programming
- Robbie Buchanan – keyboards
- Victor Carstarphen – synthesizers, programming, rhythm arrangements (2, 4, 7)
- Ronnie Foster – synthesizers, programming
- Dean Gant – keyboards, synthesizers, programming, Moog bass
- Randy Kerber – keyboards
- Jerry Peters – keyboards
- Zane Giles – guitars, rhythm arrangements (1)
- Johnny Graham – guitars, guitar solo (4)
- Paul Jackson, Jr. – guitars
- Al McKay – guitars, rhythm arrangements (1, 3, 5, 6, 8)
- Phillip Ingram – Moog bass, rhythm arrangements (1)
- James Jamerson, Jr. – bass guitar
- Ed Greene – drums
- Fred Johnson – DMX drum programming
- Paulinho da Costa – percussion
- Ralph Johnson – percussion, rhythm arrangements (1, 3, 5, 6, 8)
- Gene Page – rhythm arrangements (3)
- George Del Barrio – string arrangements (4, 6)
- Erich Bulling – rhythm arrangements (5)
- Billy Durham – rhythm arrangements (6)

=== Production ===
- Suzee Ikeda – executive producer
- Ralph Johnson – producer, liner notes
- Al McKay – producer, liner notes
- Barney Perkins – recording, mixing
- Walter Borchers – additional engineer
- Keith Seppanen – additional engineer, assistant engineer
- Jeffrey "Woody" Woodruff – additional engineer, assistant engineer
- Erik Zobler – additional engineer
- Lindy Griffin – assistant engineer
- Stan Katayama – assistant engineer
- Claudio Ordenes – assistant engineer
- John Matousek – mastering at Motown/Hitsville U.S.A. Recording Studios (Hollywood, California)
- Johnny Lee – art direction
- Janet Levinson – design
- Aaron Rapoport – photography
- The Temptations – liner notes

== Charts ==
=== Album ===
Chart (1984)	Peak position
New Zealand Albums (RMNZ)	25
US Billboard Top R&B/Hip-Hop Albums	3
US Billboard 200	55
UK Pop Albums	75
Zimbabwean Albums (ZIMA)	1

=== Singles ===
Year	Single	Chart positions			
Year	Single	US	US R&B	US AC	UK
1984	"Treat Her Like a Lady"	48	2	—	12
1985	"My Love is True (Truly for You)"	—	14	—	84
1985	"How Can You Say That it's Over"	—	81	—	—
"—" denotes releases that did not chart
