= Brand New Day (Ricki-Lee album) =

Studio album by Ricki-Lee Coulter
- Released: 11 August 2007
- Recorded: 2007
- Genres: Pop; R&B; soul; dance
- Length: 47:56
- Label: Shock
- Producers: Ricki-Lee Coulter; Pete Martin; David Gamson; Vince Pizzinga; KNS Productions

Ricki-Lee Coulter chronology
Ricki-Lee (2005)	Brand New Day (2007)	Fear & Freedom (2012)

Japanese Edition Cover

Singles from Brand New Day
- 1. "Can't Touch It" Released: 4 August 2007; 2. "Love Is All Around" Released: 10 November 2007; 3. "Can't Sing a Different Song" Released: 15 March 2008

Brand New Day is the second studio album by Australian singer and songwriter Ricki-Lee Coulter. It was released in Australia on 11 August 2007 and in Japan on 9 January 2008. Brand New Day debuted and peaked at number 37 on the ARIA Albums Chart and was certified gold by the Australian Recording Industry Association (ARIA). The album produced Coulter's most successful single to date, the lead single "Can't Touch It", which peaked at number two on the ARIA Singles Chart and was certified platinum. Its subsequent singles "Love Is All Around" and "Can't Sing a Different Song" were also ARIA top-ten hits.

== Background ==
Coulter travelled to New York, Los Angeles and London in February and March 2007 to begin working on her second album. Singer-songwriters and producers who worked on the album include KNS Productions, David Gamson, Marc Nelkin, Vince Pizzinga, Pete Martin and Andy Love. She also worked with Australian producers Andrew De Sylva, Audius Mtawarira and Glenn Cunningham. During this time, Coulter was still a member of the girl group Young Divas. In June 2007, it was announced that Coulter left the group to concentrate both on her solo career and then-upcoming wedding to fiancé Jamie Babbington. She explained, "I really had to get back to doing what I love doing and that's my solo career." Coulter's decision to head off to London, New York and Los Angeles in February 2007 to work on the album cited as a factor in the cancellation of plans for the Young Divas to support boy band Westlife on their Australian tour.

== Singles ==
"Can't Touch It" was released as the album's lead single in August 2007. It debuted and peaked at number two on the ARIA Singles Chart and was certified platinum by the Australian Recording Industry Association (ARIA) for shipments of 70,000 copies. The song spent 23 weeks in the ARIA top fifty including eight weeks in the top-ten. A digital remix extended play of the single re-titled "U Wanna Little Of This" was released on 18 May 2008 through UK record label Ministry of Sound.

Coulter covered the song "Love Is All Around" by Swedish singer Agnes Carlsson, and released it as the second single in November 2007. It debuted and peaked at number five on the ARIA Singles Chart, becoming Coulter's fourth top-ten single. The third and final single "Can't Sing a Different Song" was released in March 2008, and peaked at number eight.

== Reception ==
Matthew Chisling of Allmusic awarded the album three and a half out of five stars, stating "Brand New Day is a strong album, and it certainly brands Coulter in an airy-pop setting, yet it's nothing new as far as Ricki-Lee goes as an artist." The album debuted and peaked at number 37 on the ARIA Albums Chart and spent only two weeks in the ARIA top fifty. It was certified gold by the Australian Recording Industry Association (ARIA) for shipments of 35,000 copies. In October 2007, it was announced that Coulter sacked her manager Karen-Lee Goody of one year, due to poor sales of the album.

== Release and promotion ==
Brand New Day was released by Shock Records in Australia on 11 August 2007 and in Japan on 9 January 2008 through Pony Canyon. Coulter promoted the album by opening for Hilary Duff on the Australian leg of her Dignity Tour in January 2008. Coulter embarked on her first headlining tour, The Brand New Day Tour, in March 2008.

Date	City	Venue
Australia
6 March 2008	Brisbane	South Logan Diggers
7 March 2008	Brisbane	Kedron Wavell Services
8 March 2008	Gold Coast	Seagulls Club
14 March 2008	Dapto	Dapto Leagues Club
15 March 2008	Revesby	Revesby Workers Club
21 March 2008	Penrith	Penrith Panthers
22 March 2008	Doyalson	Doyalson RSL
28 March 2008	Hornsby	Hornsby RSL
29 March 2008	Burwood	Burwood RSL
30 March 2008	Bosley Park	Club Marconi

== Track listing ==
Standard edition
No.	Title	Music	Length
1.	"Can't Sing a Different Song"	Ricki-Lee Coulter; Andy Love; Pete Martin	3:14
2.	"Brand New Day"	Glenn Cunningham; Paul Gray	3:48
3.	"Melody of Life"	Coulter; Vince Pizzinga; Janice Robinson	4:21
4.	"Love Is All Around"	Fredrik Thornlander; Anders Wikström	3:26
5.	"Real Good Time" (featuring Jah Mirikle)	Coulter; Wessley Johnson	5:03
6.	"Can't Touch It"	Coulter; Brian Kierulf; Josh Schwartz	2:58
7.	"Take Me to a Place"	Coulter; Audius Mtawarira	4:32
8.	"Alone No More"	Coulter; M.E.R.D.A.	3:44
9.	"Clouds"	Coulter; David Gamson; Ralph McCarthy; Marc Nelkin	3:50
10.	"World Go By"	Coulter; Dee Adam; Tim Fraser	4:02
11.	"It's Just Life"	Coulter; Andrew De Silva	5:16
12.	"I Appreciate You"	Coulter; Pizzinga; Robinson	3:42
Total length:			47:56

Japanese edition
No.	Title	Music	Length
1.	"Can't Sing a Different Song"		3:14
2.	"Can't Touch It"		2:58
3.	"Hell No!" (Cabin Crew Remix Radio Edit) (bonus track)	Audius Mtawarira; C. Lim	3:20
4.	"Melody of Life"		4:21
5.	"It's Just Life"		5:16
6.	"Take Me to a Place"		4:32
7.	"Clouds"		3:50
8.	"World Go By"		4:02
9.	"Alone No More"		3:44
10.	"Love Is All Around"		3:26
11.	"Real Good Time" (featuring Jah Mirikle)		5:03
12.	"I Appreciate You"		3:42
13.	"Sunshine" (bonus track)	Kara DioGuardi; Jarrad Rogers	3:02
14.	"Brand New Day"		3:48
Total length:			54:18

== Personnel ==
- Tony Espie – mixing
- Russell Fawcus – mixing assistant
- Jarrad Hearman – mixing assistant
- Davin Pidoto – mixing assistant
- Pete Martin & the Versatile Keys – engineer, producer
- Ralph McCarthy – composer
- Dave Walker – mastering
- Jane Dobbins – background vocals
- John Roberts – trombone
- David E. Williams – project coordinator
- Stanley Andrews – guitar
- Tim Fraser – guitar
- Paul Gray – composer
- Ron Blake – flugelhorn, trumpet
- Lauren Brown – assistant, project coordinator
- David Gamson – composer, engineer, guitar, keyboards, producer, programming
- Ricki-Lee Coulter – creative director, creative producer, producer, vocals, background vocals
- Vince Pizzinga – arranger, composer, guitar, bass guitar, orchestral arrangements, piano, producer, programming

== Charts ==
Chart performance for Brand New Day
Chart (2007)	Peak position
Australian Albums (ARIA)	37

== Certifications ==
Certifications for Brand New Day
Country	Certification
Australia (ARIA)	Gold

== Release history ==
Release history and formats for Brand New Day
Region	Date	Label	Format	Catalogue
Australia	11 August 2007	Shock Records/Public Opinion	CD, digital download	PUBLIC010
Japan	9 January 2008	Pony Canyon	CD	PCCY-01860
