= Jody Williams (Afrikaans singer) =

South African singer

Jody
- Born: Jody Williams; 17 May 1990 (age 36); Cape Town, South Africa
- Origin: Cape Town, South Africa
- Genres: Pop, R&B
- Occupation: Singer
- Instrument: Vocals
- Years active: 2007–present
- Label: Sony BMG Records
- Website: http://www.jody-williams.co.za

Jody Williams (born May 17, 1990) is a South African pop/R&B singer. She won the fourth season of the South African reality television singing competition Idols on 9 December 2007 at age 17, making her the youngest winner of the competition until 2017, when Paxton Fielies won the Competition at age 17.

Her debut platinum-selling album, Just Gonna Be Me, reached No. 1 on the South African Albums Chart, and spawned three consecutive number one singles on the South African Airplay Chart: "Love Is All Around", "Kiss of Life", "Wind It", and "Love Like This Before". Elements of Pop, R&B, dance and soul can be found in her music. Jody has cited singers Whitney Houston, Mariah Carey and Celine Dion as her main musical inspirations and influences.

== Early life ==
Jody grew up in a home in Cape Town, South Africa, as one of three siblings. Jody has an older sister Candice, with a five-year age difference. She first picked up a hairbrush and started singing at age nine. At age 13, Jody started receiving vocal training. She attended Bosmansdam High School in Bothasig.

== Idols ==
When auditions for the fourth season of Idols arrived in Cape Town, she and her father jumped at the opportunity. During the six-month-long competition, Jody became known for her performances of power ballads by artists including Whitney Houston, Celine Dion and Christina Aguilera. Her performances of Houston's "Run To You" and "I Wanna Dance With Somebody (Who Loves Me)" were raved as her best performances of the whole competition; she repeated them on the final stage of the competition. Jody also performed "brilliant" versions of songs originally done by male artists, including Bryan Adams, Michael Jackson and Luther Vandross.

Jody also did renditions of current hits, namely the pop rock song "Behind These Hazel Eyes" by American Idol winner Kelly Clarkson and Swedish Idol winner Agnes Carlsson's "Love Is All Around" – which later became the winner's song and Jody's first single. She also sang some songs originally performed by girl groups: "I Don't Need A Man" by The Pussycat Dolls and "Secrets" by South African urban-pop girl group Jamali.

- Idols performances:
  - Top 2: "Love Is All Around" – Agnes Carlsson
  - Top 2: "Run to You" – Whitney Houston
  - Top 2: "I Wanna Dance with Somebody (Who Loves Me)" – Whitney Houston
  - Top 3: "Dance with My Father" – Luther Vandross
  - Top 3: "Ain't No Other Man" – Christina Aguilera
  - Top 3: "On the Wings of Love" – Jeffrey Osborne
  - Top 4: "I Surrender" – Celine Dion
  - Top 4: "Hurt" – Christina Aguilera
  - Top 5: "The Colour of My Love" – Celine Dion
  - Top 5: "Black or White" – Michael Jackson
  - Top 6: "Heaven" – Bryan Adams
  - Top 6: "I Don't Need a Man" – The Pussycat Dolls
  - Top 7: "Secrets" – Jamali
  - Top 8: "Behind These Hazel Eyes" – Kelly Clarkson
  - Top 9: "Over & Over" – Puff Johnson
  - Top 10: "The Best" – Tina Turner
  - Top 12: "I Wanna Dance With Somebody (Who Loves Me)" – Whitney Houston
  - Top 14: "Run to You" – Whitney Houston
  - Top 12 Girls: "The Greatest Reward" – Celine Dion

On 9 December 2007, Jody beat out 21-year-old fellow Capetonian, Andriëtte Norman on the season finale, which saw a record-breaking 7,803,990 votes being cast. It was the first season where votes could be cast through the social-networking communication device "MXit"; hence the record-breaking votes. Jody was said to have the majority of support in both the adult and teenager fanbases. Jody described her song choices during the competition:

I chose songs I knew because it would makes my performances easier. I didn't want to try to learn a whole new song and then forget my words.

With most of the South African Idols fading after winning the competition, Jody reassured her fans:

I'm not gonna fade I'll always be there making new music for you guys.

Her winnings included a record deal with Sony BMG, a Citroen C1, a Cardies hamper, cellphone and spa treatments for a year and Yamaha music and sound equipment among other prizes. From Idols, Jody grew to become more mature and more confident with herself, and her performing and vocal abilities.

== After Idols ==
After Jody's victory on Idols, Independent Democrats leader Patricia de Lille said:

Idols winner Jody Williams deserves special congratulations on her achievement of becoming South Africa's youngest idol. We know that she will continue to inspire the youth of today. To her parents we can only say, well done for raising such a beautiful, talented child. South Africa certainly needs more young role models like her. The ID will give her all the support she needs.

Jody was complimented by Celine Dion, who told her, "Good luck for the future. I wish you all the best. You'll get there". Jody was the opening act for Celine Dion in some of Dion's first 9 shows in the South African and first overall leg of Dion's Taking Chances Tour, which began 14 February 2008. She appeared on Idols, then recorded her debut album, whilst still at Bosmansdam High School, in the Milnerton suburb of Cape Town. She graduated at the end of 2009.

Williams performed a few songs in the 2009 South African Idols Finale including "Wind It". She represented the continent of Africa on the song "Everyone", the Official Theme Song of the Singapore 2010 Youth Olympic Games.

Williams collaborated with four other artists, American Sean Kingston (Americas), Singaporean Tabitha Nauser (Asia), British Steve Appleton (Europe), and Australian Jessica Mauboy (Oceania). She released her newest single (2013) titled "Cosmic Coincidence" which is her first single to be available to buy on iTunes. Two years earlier she released a Christmas single titled "This Christmas" written with the help of her sister, Candice.
