= Can't Sing a Different Song =

Single by Ricki-Lee Coulter

from the album Brand New Day
- Released: 15 March 2008
- Recorded: 2008
- Genre: Pop; R&B
- Length: 3:14
- Label: Shock
- Songwriters: Ricki-Lee Coulter; Pete Martin; Andy Love
- Producer: Pete Martin

Ricki-Lee Coulter singles chronology
"Love Is All Around" (2007)	"Can't Sing a Different Song" (2008)	"Wiggle It" (2008)

"Can't Sing a Different Song" is a song performed by Australian singer-songwriter, Ricki-Lee Coulter. Co-written by Coulter, Andy Love and Pete Martin, the song serves as the third and final single released from the singer's second album, Brand New Day. It was released both digitally and physically on 15 March 2008. The music video for "Can't Sing a Different Song" was directed by Fin Edquist and filmed in the Footscray Warehouses in Melbourne.

== Track listing ==
- CD single
1. "Can't Sing a Different Song" - 3:14
2. "World Go By" (Bonus track) - 3:42
3. "Can't Sing a Different Song" (Clubbangaz remix) - 3:14
4. "Can't Sing a Different Song" (Instrumental) - 3:13
5. "Can't Sing a Different Song" (A cappella) - 3:13
- Digital download
1. "Can't Sing a Different Song" - 3:13
2. "Can't Sing a Different Song" (Clubbangaz remix) - 3:13
3. "Can't Sing a Different Song" (Instrumental) - 3:12
4. "Can't Sing a Different Song" (A cappella) - 3:12
5. "Can't Sing a Different Song" (Supermelody remix) - 4:21

== Credits and personnel ==
Credits adapted from the liner notes of Ricki-Lee: The Singles.

Locations

- Mixed at Sing Sing Studios.
- Mastered at Stepford Audio.

Personnel

- Songwriting – Ricki-Lee Coulter, Pete Martin, Andy Love
- Production and engineering – Pete Martin
- Mixing – Tony Espie
- Mastering – Dave Walker

== Charts ==
"Can't Sing a Different Song" debuted on the ARIA Singles Chart at number eight, before dropping twenty-six spots down to number 34 the following week. It became Coulter's fifth top-ten single in Australia and ranked at number 50 on the ARIA End of Year top 50 Australian artists singles of 2008.

=== Weekly chart ===
Chart (2008)	Peak position
ARIA Singles Chart	8

=== Year-end chart ===
Chart (2008)	Rank
Australian Artists Singles Chart	50

== Release history ==
Country	Date	Format	Label
Australia	15 March 2008	CD, digital download	Shock records
