= Treat Her Like a Lady (The Temptations song) =

Single by The Temptations

from the album Truly for You
- Released: November 6, 1984
- Recorded: March–April, 1984
- Genre: R&B; soul
- Length: 3:59 (single edit); 4:40 (album version)
- Label: Gordy
- Songwriters: Ali-Ollie Woodson; Otis Williams
- Producers: Ali-Ollie Woodson; Al McKay; Ralph Johnson

The Temptations singles chronology
"Sail Away" (1984)	"Treat Her Like a Lady" (1984)	"My Love Is True (Truly for You)" (1985)

"Treat Her Like a Lady" is a 1984 single by the American vocal group the Temptations. Released on November 6, 1984 (airplay in October), it is the first single on which Ali-Ollie Woodson sang lead. The song appears on Temptations' album Truly for You, also released in 1984, and was co-written by Woodson and Otis Williams and co-produced by Woodson and former Earth, Wind & Fire members Al McKay and Ralph Johnson.

== Background ==
The single was the Temptations' biggest success on R&B radio since 1975, reaching number 2 on the R&B chart, and just missing the top 40 of the Billboard Hot 100 at number 48. It also reached number 12 on the UK Singles Chart.

== Charts ==
Chart performance for "Treat Her Like a Lady"
Chart (1984–1985)	Peak position
Belgium (Ultratop 50 Flanders)	25
Netherlands (Single Top 100)	16
New Zealand (Recorded Music NZ)	7
UK Singles (Official Charts)	12
US Billboard Hot 100	48
US Billboard Hot Dance Club Play	13
US Billboard Hot Black Singles	2

== Certifications ==
Region	Certification	Certified units/sales
New Zealand (RMNZ)	Platinum	30,000^{‡}
^{‡} Sales+streaming figures based on certification alone.
