= To Be Continued... (The Temptations album) =

Studio album by The Temptations
- Released: June 17, 1986
- Recorded: December 1985–May 1986
- Studio: Conway Studios, Ocean Way Recording and Galaxy Sound Studios (Hollywood, California); One On One Studios (North Hollywood, California); Can-Am Recorders (Tarzana, California); Motown/Hitsville U.S.A. Recording Studios (Los Angeles, California)
- Genre: R&B, soul
- Length: 44:59
- Label: Gordy
- Producer: Peter Bunetta; Rick Chudacoff

The Temptations chronology
Touch Me (1985)	To Be Continued... (1986)	Together Again (1987)

Professional ratings
Review scores
Source	Rating
AllMusic	3/5 stars
The Rolling Stone Album Guide	2.5/5 stars

To Be Continued... is a 1986 album by American R&B vocal group The Temptations released on June 17, 1986 by Motown Records' Gordy label. The album featured the group's third top ten R&B hit of the 1980s, "Lady Soul", which reached No. 4 R&B and No. 47 pop. It was the third and final album to feature Ali-Ollie Woodson during his first stint with the group. The following year he was replaced by Dennis Edwards, then two years later rejoined the group replacing Edwards. Also, saxophonist David Sanborn appears on the title track.

== Track listing ==
All tracks produced by Peter Bunetta and Rick Chudacoff.

Side one
No.	Title	Writer(s)	Lead singer(s)	Length
1.	"Lady Soul"	Mark Holden	Ali-Ollie Woodson	5:02
2.	"Message To The World"	Paul Fox, Franne Golde, Dennis Lambert	Woodson, Ron Tyson, Otis Williams	4:24
3.	"To Be Continued"	Williams, Woodson	Woodson	5:01
4.	"Put Us Together Again"	Gerard McMahon	Richard Street	3:55
5.	"Someone"	David Anderson, Bill LaBounty	Woodson	4:37

Side two
No.	Title	Writer(s)	Lead singer(s)	Length
1.	"Girls (They Like It)"	Peter Bunetta, Rick Chudacoff, Lenny Macaluso	Woodson, Tyson, Street, Williams, Melvin Franklin	4:037
2.	"More Love, Your Love"	Mark Holden, Steve Le Gassick	Tyson	4:23
3.	"A Fine Mess"	Dennis Lambert, Henry Mancini	Woodson	4:04
4.	"You're The One"	Tyson	Franklin	4:39
5.	"Love Me Right"	Street, Williams, Woodson	Woodson	4:17

== Personnel ==
The Temptations

- Melvin Franklin – vocals
- Richard Street – vocals
- Ron Tyson – vocals
- Otis Williams – vocals
- Ali-Ollie Woodson – vocals, keyboards, synthesizers

Musicians

- Robbie Buchanan – keyboards, synthesizers
- Brad Buxer – keyboards, synthesizers
- Rick Chudacoff – keyboards, synthesizers
- Bill Elliott – keyboards, synthesizers
- Paul Fox – keyboards, synthesizers
- Steve Le Gassick – keyboards, synthesizers
- Alan Pasqua – keyboards, synthesizers
- Benjamin Wright – keyboards, synthesizers
- Dann Huff – guitars (1–9)
- Wali Ali – guitars (10)
- Neil Stubenhaus – bass
- Peter Bunetta – drums
- Vinnie Colaiuta – drums
- John Robinson – drums
- Paulinho da Costa – percussion
- David Sanborn – alto saxophone (3)
- Jerry Peterson – EWI solo (6)
- Darrell Leonard – electronic valve instrument (7)
- Mike Turk – harmonica solo (9)
- Rev. James Cleveland Gospel Messengers – choir (5)

=== Production ===
- Steve Barri – executive producer
- Eddie Lambert – executive producer
- Peter Bunetta – producer
- Rick Chudacoff – producer
- Mick Guzauski – recording, mixing (1–9)
- Daren Klein – recording, mixing (10)
- Paul Lani – recording
- Csaba Pectoz – recording
- Jeff Bennett – assistant engineer
- Michael Dotson – assistant engineer
- Stan Katayama – assistant engineer
- Bob Loftus – assistant engineer
- Richard McKernan – assistant engineer
- Jesse Peck – assistant engineer
- Toby Wright – assistant engineer
- Bernie Grundman Mastering (Hollywood, California) – mastering location
- Johnny Lee – art direction
- Janet Levinson – design
- Aaron Rapoport – photography

== Charts ==
=== Weekly charts ===
Chart (1986)	Peak position
US Billboard 200	74
US Top R&B/Hip-Hop Albums (Billboard)	4
Zimbabwean Albums (ZIMA)	7

=== Year-end charts ===
Chart (1986)	Position
US Top R&B/Hip-Hop Albums (Billboard)	49
Chart (1987)	Position
US Top R&B/Hip-Hop Albums (Billboard)	42

=== Singles ===
Year	Single	Chart positions		
Year	Single	US	US R&B	US AC
1986	"A Fine Mess"	—	63	28
1986	"Lady Soul"	47	4	—
1986	"To Be Continued"	—	25	—
1987	"Someone"	—	45	—
"—" denotes releases that did not chart
