= Can't Touch It =

Single by Ricki-Lee Coulter

Single by Ricki-Lee Coulter

from the album Brand New Day
- B-side: "Take Me to a Place"
- Released: 4 August 2007
- Recorded: 2007
- Genre: Pop
- Length: 2:53
- Label: Shock
- Songwriters: Ricki-Lee Coulter; KNS Productions
- Producers: KNS; Glenn Cunningham (vocals)

Ricki-Lee Coulter singles chronology
"Breathe" (2006)	"Can't Touch It" (2007)	"Love Is All Around" (2007)

Music video
- "Can't Touch It" on YouTube

"Can't Touch It" is a song by Australian singer and songwriter Ricki-Lee Coulter. It was written by Coulter with Brian Kierulf and Joshua M. Schwartz of KNS Productions, who also produced the song. "Can't Touch It" was released as the lead single from Coulter's second studio album, Brand New Day, on 4 August 2007. Upon its release, "Can't Touch It" peaked at number two on the ARIA Singles Chart and number one on the ARIA Dance Singles Chart, where it remained for eight consecutive weeks. It was certified platinum by the Australian Recording Industry Association for shipments of 70,000 copies.

The accompanying music video was directed by Fin Edquist and features Coulter with her girlfriends at a nightclub. She promoted "Can't Touch It" with performances at instore appearances and the 2007 ARIA Music Awards. The song was also part of Coulter's set list for her first solo headlining tour, The Brand New Day Tour. In May 2008, a digital remix extended play of "Can't Touch It", re-titled "U Wanna Little of This", was released throughout Europe by dance label Ministry of Sound UK. "Can't Touch It" has been used for several American television shows and was featured in both the trailer and closing credits of the film Sex and the City 2 (2010).

== Background and release ==
In 2006, Coulter joined forces with previous Australian Idol contestants Paulini, Emily Williams and Kate DeAraugo to be part of the all-girl singing project called Young Divas. The project was initially formed to promote a joint 17-date national tour, where all singers would perform their solo material and several songs as a group. Together, they released a self-titled album of classic disco and pop covers, which included the top-ten singles "This Time I Know It's for Real" and "Happenin' All Over Again". The album was a commercial success, debuting at number four on the ARIA Albums Chart and was certified double platinum by the Australian Recording Industry Association for shipments of 140,000 copies. In February 2007, Coulter headed overseas to work on her second solo album. Four months later, Coulter announced her departure from the Young Divas to resume her solo career. She was later replaced by Jessica Mauboy.

"Can't Touch It" was released as the lead single from Coulter's second solo album, Brand New Day, on 4 August 2007 as a digital download and on 6 August as a CD single. It was written in New York City by Coulter with Brian Kierulf and Joshua M. Schwartz of KNS Productions, who also produced the song. Coulter explained, "The song is about me and my best friend going out for a night out in New York, not needing the guys, and just having a great night." The digital release of "Can't Touch It" included the B-side track "Take Me to a Place", a cappella and instrumental versions and two remixes by Rok Coalition. In December 2007, it was announced that Coulter had signed an international record deal with dance label Ministry of Sound UK. A digital remix extended play of "Can't Touch It", re-titled "U Wanna Little of This", was released through the label in Europe on 18 May 2008. The EP featured radio edits and remixes by WAWA and Ali Payami.

== Reception ==
Bernard Zuel of The Sydney Morning Herald described "Can't Touch It" as a "very Christina Aguilera-like beefed up '40s swing" type of song. It was nominated for 'Best Performing Independent Single/EP' at the 2007 AIR Awards. For the issue dated 13 August 2007, "Can't Touch It" debuted at number two on the ARIA Singles Chart and was the highest new entry of that week. It became Coulter's third top-ten single as a solo artist and spent eight consecutive weeks in the top-ten. The song also appeared on the ARIA Dance Singles Chart, where it peaked at number one and remained at that position for eight consecutive weeks. In 2008, "Can't Touch It" was certified platinum by the Australian Recording Industry Association for shipments of 70,000 copies.

== Music video and live performances ==
The music video was directed by Fin Edquist and filmed at the Lotus Bar in June 2007. The video was released in August 2007 and features Coulter with her girlfriends at a nightclub. It also includes a cameo appearance by former Australian Idol contestant and Neighbours star Dan O'Connor, who acts as a bartender and love interest. Coulter performed "Can't Touch It" and signed CD copies of the single during instore appearances at Knox City Shopping Centre and Highpoint Shopping Centre on 4 August 2007, Warringah Mall and Rhodes Shopping Centre on 5 August 2007, and Logan Hyperdome on 9 August 2007. She also performed the song during the half time of the 2007 SANFL Grand Final on 7 October and on the red carpet of the 2007 ARIA Music Awards on 28 October. "Can't Touch It" was later added to the set list of Coulter's first solo headlining tour, The Brand New Day Tour, in March 2008.

== Usage in media ==
In Australia, "Can't Touch It" was used to promote the American drama series Cashmere Mafia on the Nine Network while in the United States, the song was used to advertise the comedy-drama series Lipstick Jungle. In 2008, the song was included in the PlayStation 2 music video game SingStar Party Hits. In April 2010, "Can't Touch It" was featured in the trailer for the film Sex and the City 2. It was also played over the film's closing credits and appeared on the official soundtrack album. In September 2010, "Can't Touch It" was featured in the third episode of the American cheerleading comedy-drama series Hellcats. The song was also used in the thirteenth season of the US version of Dancing with the Stars and in the tenth season of So You Think You Can Dance US.

== Track listings ==
- Digital download
1. "Can't Touch It" (radio edit) – 2:53
2. "Take Me to a Place" – 4:32
3. "Can't Touch It" (Rok Coalition radio remix) – 4:35
4. "Can't Touch It" (a capella) – 2:47
5. "Can't Touch It" (instrumental) – 2:56
6. "Can't Touch It" (Rok Coalition extended remix) – 8:33
- Digital remix EP
1. "U Wanna Little of This" (WAWA radio edit) – 2:43
2. "U Wanna Little of This" (Ali Payami radio edit) – 2:20
3. "U Wanna Little of This" (WAWA vocal mix) – 7:23
4. "U Wanna Little of This" (Ali Payami club mix) – 6:22
5. "U Wanna Little of This" (WAWA dub) – 6:56

== Credits and personnel ==
Credits are adapted from the liner notes of Ricki-Lee: The Singles.

Locations

- Mixed at Sing Sing Studios
- Mastered at Stepford Audio

Personnel

- Songwriting – Ricki-Lee Coulter, KNS Productions (Brian Kierulf and Joshua M. Schwartz)
- Production and engineering – KNS
- Additional vocal production – Glenn Cunningham
- Background vocals – Ricki-Lee Coulter, Carmen Smith
- Mixing – Tony Espie
- Mastering – Dave Walker

== Charts ==
=== Weekly charts ===
Chart (2007)	Peak position
Australia (ARIA)	2
Australian Dance (ARIA)	1

=== Year-end charts ===
Chart (2007)	Rank
Australia (ARIA)	28
Australian Artists (ARIA)	5
Australian Dance (ARIA)	2

Chart (2008)	Rank
Australian Artists (ARIA)	33
Australian Dance (ARIA)	23

== Certification ==
Region	Certification	Certified units/sales
Australia (ARIA)	Platinum	70,000^{^}
^{^} Shipments figures based on certification alone.

== Release history ==
Region	Date	Format	Label	Catalogue	Ref.
Australia	4 August 2007	Digital download	Shock	—N/a	
Australia	6 August 2007	CD	Shock	SHK PUBLIC011	
Europe	18 May 2008	Digital remix EP	Ministry of Sound	—N/a	
