= Touch Me (The Temptations album) =

Studio album by The Temptations
- Released: November 12, 1985
- Recorded: 1984
- Studio: Minot Sound, white Plains, New York, United States; Motown/Hitsville U.S.A. Recordings Studios, Hollywood, California, United States; Ritesonian Studios, Van Nuys, California, United States
- Genre: Soul
- Length: 41:33
- Language: English
- Label: Gordy
- Producer: Marcus Miller; The Temptations; Russ Terrana

The Temptations chronology
Truly for You (1984)	Touch Me (1985)	To Be Continued... (1986)

Touch Me is a 1985 studio album from American soul group The Temptations.

== Reception ==
Editors at AllMusic Guide scored this album three out of five stars, with reviewer Craig Lytle highlighting several individual tracks and writing that "the overall arrangement allows the Tempts to interject their splendid vocal presence".

== Track listing ==
Side one, tracks one, two and five and side two, tracks one and four produced by The Temptations; side one, track three, side two, tracks one and two produced by Bruce Miller and Russ Terrana; side one track four, side two, track three produced by Marcus Miller.

Side one
No.	Title	Writer(s)	Lead singer(s)	Length
1.	"Magic"	Ali-Ollie Woodson	Woodson, Melvin Franklin	5:14
2.	"Givehersomeattention"	Otis Williams, Woodson	Woodson	4:08
3.	"Deeper Than Love"	Lenny Lee Goldsmith, Bob Goudo, Judy Parker, and Fred Webb	Richard Street	3:3
4.	"I'm Fascinated"	Mark Baker, Little Jimmy Scott	Street	4:05
5.	"Touch Me"	Williams, Woodson	Woodson, Williams (spoken word)	4:59

Side two
No.	Title	Writer(s)	Lead singer(s)	Length
1.	"Don't Break Your Promise to Me"	Victor Carstarphen, Alfie Silas, Ron Tyson, and Williams	Tyson, Alfie, Franklin (spoken word)	5:00
2.	"She Got Tired of Loving Me"	Eddie Bayers, Mark Gray	Street	4:32
3.	"Do You Really Love Your Baby"	Marcus Miller and Luther Vandross	Woodson, Tyron	4:45
4.	"Oh Lover"	Williams, Woodson	Woodson	4:52

== Personnel ==
The Temptations

- Melvin Franklin – vocals (bass); production on "Magic", "Givehersomeattention", "Touch Me", "Don't Break Your Promise to Me", and "Oh Lover"
- Richard Street – vocals (tenor); production on "Magic", "Givehersomeattention", "Touch Me", "Don't Break Your Promise to Me", and "Oh Lover"
- Ron Tyson – vocals (tenor/falsetto); production on "Magic", "Givehersomeattention", "Touch Me", "Don't Break Your Promise to Me", and "Oh Lover"
- Otis Williams – vocals (baritone); arrangement on "Touch Me"; production on "Magic", "Givehersomeattention", "Touch Me", "Don't Break Your Promise to Me", and "Oh Lover"
- Ali-Ollie Woodson – vocals (tenor); arrangement on "Givehersomeattention", "Touch Me", and "Oh Lover"; production on "Magic", "Givehersomeattention", "Touch Me", "Don't Break Your Promise to Me", and "Oh Lover"

Additional musicians

- Wally Ali – guitar on "Givehersomeattention" and "Touch Me"
- Paulinho Da Costa – percussion on "Magic" and "Givehersomeattention"
- Charles Fearing – guitar on "Magic" and "Oh Lover"
- Chuck Findley – trumpet on "Deeper Than Love", "Don't Break Your Promise to Me", and "She Got Tired of Loving Me"
- Gary Grant – trumpet on "Deeper Than Love", "Don't Break Your Promise to Me", and "She Got Tired of Loving Me"
- Terry Harrington – saxophone on "Deeper Than Love", "Don't Break Your Promise to Me", and "She Got Tired of Loving Me"
- Jerry Hey – trumpet on "Deeper Than Love", "Don't Break Your Promise to Me", and "She Got Tired of Loving Me"
- Slyde Hyde – trombone on "Deeper Than Love", "Don't Break Your Promise to Me", and "She Got Tired of Loving Me"
- Paul Jackson, Jr. – guitar on "Deeper Than Love", "Don't Break Your Promise to Me", and "She Got Tired of Loving Me"
- Randy Kerber – keyboards on "Deeper Than Love", "Don't Break Your Promise to Me", and "She Got Tired of Loving Me"
- Anthony McDonald – percussion on "I'm Fascinated"
- Marcus Miller – guitar on "I'm Fascinated", keyboards on "I'm Fascinated", arrangement on "I'm Fascinated" and "Do You Really Love Your Baby", production on "I'm Fascinated" and "Do You Really Love Your Baby"
- Nick Moroch – guitar on "I'm Fascinated"
- Bob Payne – trombone on "Deeper Than Love", "Don't Break Your Promise to Me", and "She Got Tired of Loving Me"
- John Robinson – drums on "Deeper Than Love", "Don't Break Your Promise to Me", and "She Got Tired of Loving Me"; percussion on "Deeper Than Love", "Don't Break Your Promise to Me", and "She Got Tired of Loving Me"
- Alfie Silas – vocals on "Don't Break Your Promise to Me"
- Neil Stubenhaus – bass guitar on "Deeper Than Love", "Don't Break Your Promise to Me", and "She Got Tired of Loving Me"
- Luther Vandross – backing vocals on "Do You Really Love Your Baby"
- Ernie Watts – saxophone on "Deeper Than Love", "Don't Break Your Promise to Me", and "She Got Tired of Loving Me"
- Benjamin Wright – synthesizer on "Magic", "Givehersomeattention", and "Oh Lover"; arrangement on "Magic", "Givehersomeattention", and "Oh Lover"; computer on "Magic", "Givehersomeattention", and "Oh Lover"

Technical personnel

- Ray Bardani – recording on "I'm Fascinated" and "Do You Really Love Your Baby", mixing on "I'm Fascinated" and "Do You Really Love Your Baby"
- Susan Boehler – project coordination
- Dean Burt – assistant engineering on "Deeper Than Love", "I'm Fascinated", "Touch Me", "Don't Break Your Promise to Me", "She Got Tired of Loving Me", and "Do You Really Love Your Baby"
- Iris Cohen – assistant engineering on "I'm Fascinated" and "Do You Really Love Your Baby"
- Michael Colina – programming on "I'm Fascinated" and "Do You Really Love Your Baby"
- Michael Dotson – assistant engineering on "Deeper Than Love", "Don't Break Your Promise to Me", and "She Got Tired of Loving Me"
- Iris Gordy – executive production
- Steve James – assistant engineering on "Magic", "Givehersomeattention", "Touch Me", and "Oh Lover"
- Fred Law – recording on "Touch Me"
- Johnny Lee – art direction
- Bruce Miller – arrangement on "Deeper Than Love", "Don't Break Your Promise to Me", and "She Got Tired of Loving Me"; conducting on "Deeper Than Love", "Don't Break Your Promise to Me", and "She Got Tired of Loving Me"; production on "Deeper Than Love", "Don't Break Your Promise to Me", and "She Got Tired of Loving Me"
- Barney Perkins – recording on "I'm Fascinated" and "Do You Really Love Your Baby"; mixing engineering on "Magic", "Givehersomeattention", "Touch Me", and "Oh Lover"
- Bob Robitaille – recording on "Do You Really Love Your Baby"
- Jeff Sanders – mastering at Motown/Hitsville U.S.A. Recording Studios
- Keith Seppanen – assistant engineering on "Magic", "Givehersomeattention", "Touch Me", and "Oh Lover"
- Karen Siegel – assistant engineering on "Givehersomeattention" and "Oh Lover"
- Mark Smith – assistant engineering on "Oh Lover"
- Steve Smith – recording on "Magic", "Givehersomeattention", "Touch Me", and "Oh Lover"
- John Steinoff – sequencing on "Magic", "Givehersomeattention", and "Oh Lover"; programming on "Touch Me"
- Russ Terrana – recording on "Deeper Than Love", "Don't Break Your Promise to Me", and "She Got Tired of Loving Me"; mixing on "Deeper Than Love", "Don't Break Your Promise to Me", and "She Got Tired of Loving Me"; production on "Deeper Than Love", "Don't Break Your Promise to Me", and "She Got Tired of Loving Me"
- Raúl Vega – photography
- Wayne Warnecke – recording on "I'm Fascinated"

== Chart performance ==
Touch Me spent 10 weeks on the Billboard 200, peaking at 146 on August 2, 1986, and spent 24 weeks on the Billboard Top R&B/Hip Hop Albums chart, reaching up to 20 on August 2, 1986.

== See also ==
- List of 1985 albums
