= Sasha-Lee Davids =

South African singer

Sasha-Lee Davids (born on 2 September 1990, in Atlantis, Western Cape, South Africa) is a singer and the 2009 co-winner of Idols South Africa season 5. She is also the winner of the 2008 second season of the reality TV show "Matrix".

== Early life ==
Davids comes from Atlantis in the Western Cape. She is one of 10 children, and her father is a pastor.

== Idols ==
Davids was originally declared the sole winner after singing the winner's song "True Believer". But apparently, there had been a mix-up with late votes arriving after the cutoff time on the night of the finale. The SMS messages had been sent before the cutoff time but were only received after the deadline. M-Net made the public aware of the matter within a day and assured everyone that a recount of the votes would be done as soon as possible.

The recount showed that Jason Hartman, the then runner-up, was actually the winner, with 1.3 million votes—or 54% of the total. Sasha-Lee had come second, with 1.1 million votes—or 46%. M-Net decided however that "200,000 votes are not significant enough, and the results so close, the only fair thing to do under the circumstances is to declare a tie".

== Discography ==
=== Albums ===
- 2009: Sasha-Lee

=== Singles ===
- 2009: True Believer
- 2014: girl behind the wall
- 2014: It's so clear by Mandoza ft Sasha-Lee
- 2015: I cry
- 2017: forever yours
- 2018: free falling
- 2019: Africa Arise ft All 4 One
