= Andriëtte Norman =

- Born: 17 October 1986 (age 39); Brackenfell
- Origin: South Africa
- Genres: Pop
- Occupation: Singer

Andriëtte Norman (born 17 October 1986), who often performs as Andriëtte, is an Afrikaner singer from Brackenfell in the Western Cape, South Africa.

In 2007, Andriëtte was the runner-up in the fourth season of Idols South Africa, and released a single from the show ("Love Is All Around"). She released her debut album, Diamant, in 2008, followed by Dink Aan My (2009), Vat My Hoër (2011), Wat Rym Met Liefde (2013), and Pêrel vir 'n Kroon (2015).
