= Surface Thrills =

Studio album by The Temptations
- Released: February 18, 1983
- Recorded: November 1982–February 1983
- Studio: Bill Schnee's Studio, Hitsville Recording Studios, Artisan Sound Studios
- Genre: Rock/soul
- Length: 37:20
- Label: Gordy
- Producer: Dennis Lambert, Steve Barri

The Temptations chronology
Reunion (1982)	Surface Thrills (1983)	Back to Basics (1983)

Professional ratings
Review scores
Source	Rating
Allmusic	2/5 stars

Surface Thrills is the first of two 1983 albums released by the American R&B vocal group, the Temptations, on Motown Records' Gordy label.

== Overview ==
In this album, the group attempted to fuse their vocal harmonies with rock music production, resulting in a radical departure from the Temptations' signature soul sound. It was produced by Dennis Lambert and Steve Barri and features musical contributions from Jeff Porcaro of Toto, Raymond Lee Brown of Earth, Wind & Fire, and longtime James Brown collaborator Fred Wesley.

Surface Thrills yielded two singles, the title track and "Love on My Mind Tonight", with only the latter being moderately successful. This is the last Temptations album to feature falsetto Glenn Leonard, who departed from the group after eight years. Leonard's replacement would be singer-songwriter Ron Tyson, who made his Temptations debut with the following album, Back to Basics, though the group had worked with Tyson when they were with Atlantic Records on the Hear to Tempt You album where Tyson co-wrote a majority of the songs.

== Track listing ==
All tracks produced by Dennis Lambert and Steve Barri except side two, track three: produced by The Temptations and Bejamin F. Wright, Jr..

Side one
No.	Title	Writer(s)	Lead singer(s)	Length
1.	"Surface Thrills"	Lambert, Harold Payne	Dennis Edwards	4:30
2.	"Love on My Mind Tonight"	Lambert, Peter Beckett	Edwards	4:57
3.	"One Man Woman"	Lambert, Becket	Edwards, Glenn Leonard, Richard Street, Melvin Franklin, and Otis Williams	5:13
4.	"Show Me Your Love"	Terry Skinner, J.L. Wallace, Ken Bell	Street	4:02

Side two
No.	Title	Writer(s)	Lead singer(s)	Length
1.	"The Seeker"	Lambert, Michael Price, Dan Walsh	Edwards	4:30
2.	"What a Way to Put It"	Steve Dees, Ron Kersey	Edwards	4:37
3.	"Bringyourbodyhere (Exercise Chant)"	Otis Williams, David English, Benjamin Wright, Louis Price	Edwards, Leonard, Street, Franklin, Williams	5:13
4.	"Made in America"	M. Price, Walsh	Edwards	3:38

== Personnel ==
Performers

- Dennis Edwards - vocals (baritone/tenor)
- Melvin Franklin - vocals (bass)
- Glenn Leonard - vocals (first tenor/falsetto)
- Richard Street - vocals (second tenor)
- Otis Williams - vocals (baritone)
- Clydene Jackson, Julia Waters, Maxine Waters - background vocals ("Bringyourbodyhere")

Musicians

- Raymond Lee Brown, Nolan Smith - trumpet
- George Bohanon, Fred Wesley - trombone
- Robbie Buchanan - drums, Linn computer, Moog bass, synthesizer, Fender Rhodes synthesizer, percussion synthesizer
- Paulinho da Costa - percussion
- Richard Elliot - saxophone, lyricon
- Gary Herbig, Terry Harrington - saxophone, flute, piccolo
- Paul M. Jackson, Jr. - guitar, rhythm arranger
- Gabe Katona - synthesizer
- Dennis Lambert - vocal arranger, synthesizer, percussion synthesizer
- Roger Nichols - percussion synthesizer-Wendel
- Jeff Porcaro, John Robinson - drums
- Freddie Washington - bass
- Benjamin Wright - arranger

== Charts ==
Year	Album	Chart positions	
Year	Album	US	US R&B
1983	Surface Thrills	159	19

=== Singles ===
Year	Single	Chart positions			
Year	Single	US	US R&B	US AC	UK
1983	"Love on My Mind Tonight"	88	17	—	—
"—" denotes releases that did not chart
