= Lady Soul (song) =

- Japanese release picture sleeve

Single by The Temptations

from the album To Be Continued...
- B-side: "Put Us Together Again"
- Released: 1986
- Genre: R&B, soul
- Label: Gordy (Motown); 1856 G
- Songwriter: Mark Holden
- Producers: Peter Bunetta, Rick Chudacoff

The Temptations singles chronology
"A Fine Mess" (1986)	"Lady Soul" (1986)	"To Be Continued" (1986)

"Lady Soul" is an R&B song recorded by the Motown group The Temptations for their 1986 album To Be Continued. The mid-tempo ballad has Ali-Ollie Woodson praising his "lady" for warming his "heart" and making him "whole".

Described as "super" by AllMusic critic Ron Wynn, "Lady Soul" was one of the last Temptations single to make the Top Ten on the US R&B Chart. The single peaked at #4 on the Soul Charts and #47 on the US Hot 100. It proved that Motown, even into the late 1980s, was still releasing "interesting" and "entertaining" material by its veteran artists.
