= Love Is All Around (Agnes song) =

2007 single by Agnes

Song by Agnes

from the album Stronger
- Released: 11 October 2006 (Sweden)
- Genre: Pop
- Label: Sony BMG
- Songwriters: F. Thomander; A. Wikström

"Love Is All Around" is a song by Agnes, who was the winner of Swedish Idol 2005. The song was composed by Fredrik Thomander and Anders Wikström. It has been covered in at least 3 other continents.

== Ricki-Lee Coulter version ==
"Love Is All Around"

Single by Ricki-Lee Coulter

from the album Brand New Day
- Released: 10 November 2007
- Recorded: 2007
- Genre: Pop; R&B
- Length: 3:26
- Label: Shock
- Songwriters: F. Thomander; A. Wikström
- Producers: Epicentre; Glenn Cunningham

Ricki-Lee Coulter singles chronology
"Can't Touch It" (2007)	"Love Is All Around" (2007)	"Can't Sing a Different Song" (2008)

"Love Is All Around" was covered by Australian singer-songwriter, Ricki-Lee Coulter. It served as the second single released from her second album Brand New Day on 10 November 2007. It debuted on the ARIA Singles Chart at number five. The music video was directed by Fin Edquist and filmed at the Ferris Wheel in Birrarung Marr, Melbourne. The video depicts Coulter at a theme park, showing examples of love in all forms, such as love between couples and families.

Chart (2007)	Peak position
ARIA Singles Chart	5

=== Track listing ===
1. "Love Is All Around" - 3:26
2. "Love Is All Around" (Rok Coalition mix) - 4:22
3. "It's Just Life" - 5:16
4. "Love Is All Around" (Acappella) - 3:22
5. "Love Is All Around" (Instrumental) - 3:36
6. "Love Is All Around" (Rok Coalition Extended Remix) - 7:51

=== Credits and personnel ===
Credits adapted from the liner notes of Ricki-Lee: The Singles.

Locations

- Mixed at Sing Sing Studios.
- Mastered at Stepford Audio.

Personnel

- Songwriting – F. Thomander, A. Wikström
- Production and engineering – Epicentre
- Additional production – Glenn Cunningham
- Background vocals – Ricki-Lee Coulter, Carmen Smith, Glenn Cunningham
- Mixing – Tony Espie
- Mastering – Dave Walker

== Other versions ==
- The song was covered by Japanese boyband, Arashi, and was retitled "We Can Make It!". It featured the same melody, but its lyrics were not a direct translation, and a rap part was included. The song was also featured as the opening theme song of Bambino!, a Japanese TV drama series. It debuted at the top of the Japanese charts upon its release on 2 May 2007.
- The song was also covered by Soraya Arnelas, a singer from Spain who included it in her fourth studio album, Sin Miedo
- The song was also covered by Sing Shi Xin Hui, a well known singer in both Singapore and Malaysia. The song was retitled to "命中注定" meaning "Fated" featuring the same melody, but the lyrics differed from Love Is All Around. The song was also included in her tenth album, Truly, which was released on 17 May 2010.

== Jody version ==
"Love Is All Around"

Single by Jody Williams

from the album Just Gonna Be Me
- B-side: "Dance With My Father"
- Released: 10 December 2007
- Recorded: 2007
- Genre: Pop
- Length: 3:51 (Album Version)
- Label: Sony BMG
- Songwriters: F. Thomander; A. Wikström
- Producers: Brian O Shea; Crighton Goodwill

Jody Williams singles chronology
"Love Is All Around" (2007)	"Kiss Of Life" (2008)

"Love Is All Around" was covered by South African singer Jody Williams, who released it as the first single from her debut album Just Gonna Be Me. It was released on 10 December 2007.

The song was scheduled as the "winner's song" in the fourth season of Idols (South Africa) and was performed by both Jody and competition runner-up, Andriëtte Norman. On 9 December 2007, Jody won the show and sung out the finale with the song. A day later on 10 December 2007 it was released on CD in South Africa with "Dance with My Father" as the CD's B-side - a song Jody performed on Idols which was originally done by singer Luther Vandross.

=== Background and success ===
"Love Is All Around" features as a bonus track on Jody's debut album Just Gonna Me. The song was ironically released a month before as a single by Australian Idol Ricki Lee. Jody's cover of the song features distinctly different effects to it, turning a pop song into what was described as "an urbanised version" of the Agnes original. Jody's version also differs in length, being the longest of all covers of the song so far.

"Love Is All Around" was released as a CD single a day after Jody won South African Idols. It was sold out on the first day and accumulated Gold status in South Africa after selling 30,000 copies. The song also reached #1 on AF Stereo's "South African Airplay Chart"

=== Charts ===
Chart	Peak position
South African Airplay Chart	1
