= Break the Silence (Jason Hartman song) =

"Break The Silence"

Single by Jason Hartman
- Released: 4 May 2009
- Recorded: 2009
- Genre: Pop rock
- Length: 3:28
- Label: BMG

"Break the Silence" is the debut and winning single of South African Idol co-winner Jason Hartman. The single was available for digital download via the Nokia Music Store on 4 May 2009. It entered major South African radio charts with healthy debuts.

== Formats ==
=== CD ===
1. "Break the Silence" (3:28)
2. "(Everything I Do) I Do It for You" (Live Version)

=== Digital single ===
1. "Break the Silence" (single)

== Charts ==
"Break the Silence" chart performance
Chart (2009)	Peak position
Nokia Take40sa	1
East Coast Radio Top 20	1
Highveld Homebrew	2
Take2.co.za	2
Algoa FM Top 30	2
5fm Vodafone Live Hi 5@5	19
