= MarcAlex =

South African music group

- Origin: Soweto, South Africa
- Members: Marc Rantseli; Alex Rantseli

MarcAlex are a South African musical group who had a hit with their song "Quick Quick", which went to number 1 on the South African music charts in June 1989. The group is made up of brothers Marc and Alex Rantseli.

They won the OKTV Awards for Best Newcomer in 1988 and their song "Heartbreakin' Love" went to number 1 on the 5FM and Radio Metro charts.

Marc Rantseli died from a brain Aneurysm on 8 November 2023 at the age of 58 years old.
