= Jason Hartman =

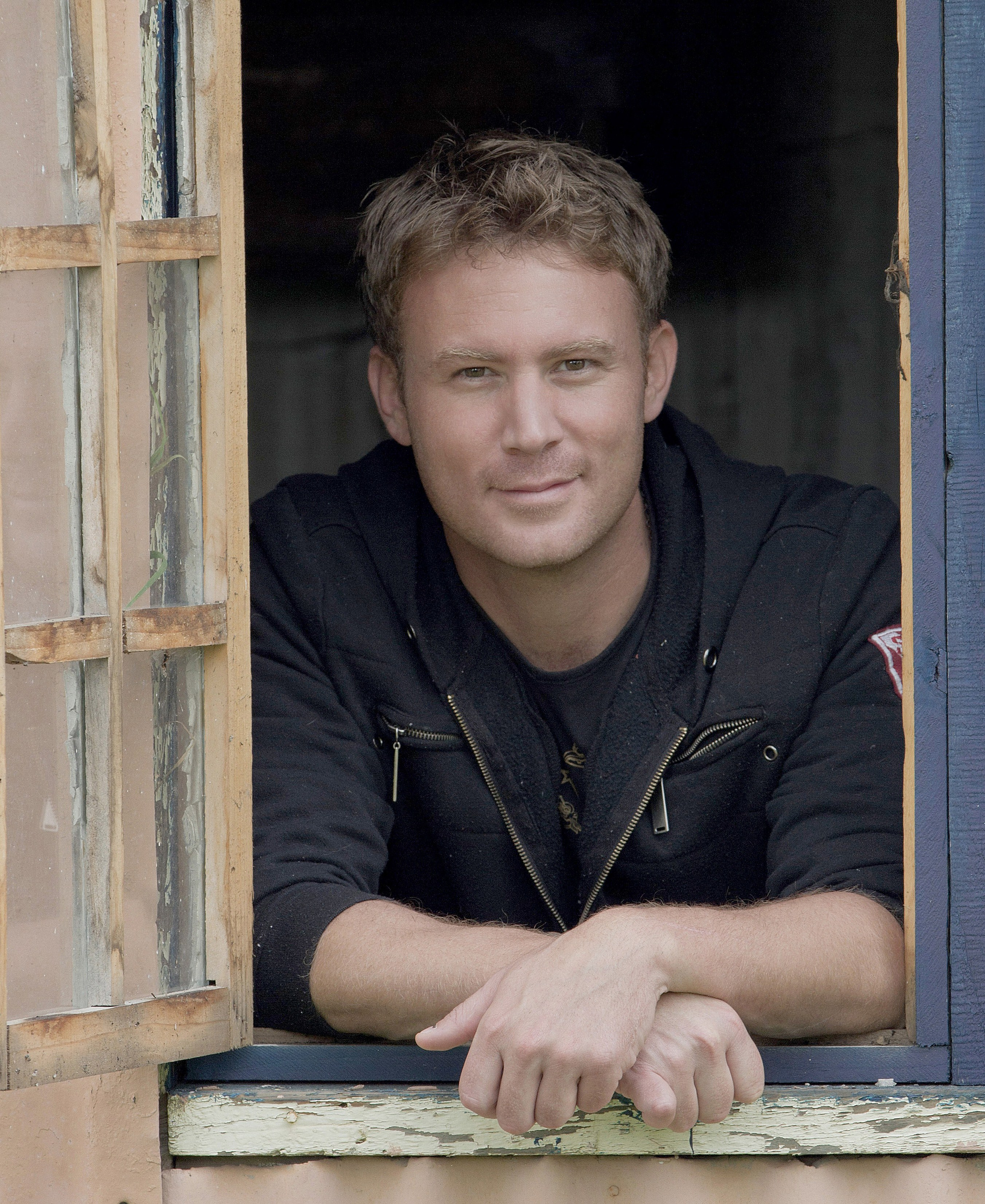

Background information
- Born: Jason Hartman; 21 November 1979 (age 46)
- Origin: Midlands, KwaZulu Natal, South Africa
- Genres: Pop, Pop-Rock, Rock
- Occupation: Singer-songwriter
- Instruments: Vocal, guitar
- Years active: 1996–present
- Label: Sony BMG
- Website: http://www.jasonhartman.co.za/

Jason Hartman is a South African singer-songwriter and the 2009 co-winner of season 5 of the Idols (South Africa). After a malfunction occurred with the text lines in the finals, it was decided that even though Jason was the official winner of Idols, the title would be shared between him and the runner up Sasha Lee Davids.

== Early career ==
In July 2003, Jason and his brother (Scott Hartman), father (Sam Hartman) and band-mate Donovan Thatcher formed the band Men of Trees. Men of Trees played music from many genres. Their repertoire included Counting Crows, Sting, Bob Marley and much more.

== Idols ==
Jason auditioned for Idols season 5 in Johannesburg even though he is originally from the KZN midlands. All judges seemed impressed with him but all thought his age would be a disadvantage as the contest caters for young contestants and all judges thought he would battle to get noticed with the young crowd. However he was put through to the theater week where he progressed into the Top 14. From the Top 10 onwards he was a contender that had not landed up in the bottom three once. A favourite to win. Unfortunately there was a mix up with late votes arriving after the cutoff time on the night of the finale. The sms's had been sent before the cutoff time but were received only after the deadline. M-Net made the public aware of the matter within a day and assured everyone that a recount of the votes would be done as soon as possible. The recount showed that Jason won, with 1.3 million votes, or 54% of the total. Sasha-Lee Davids came second, with 1.1 million votes, or 46%. M-Net decided that "200,000 votes are not significant enough, and the results so close, the only fair thing to do under the circumstances is to declare a tie", thus giving Jason and Sasha-Lee the same prizes.

=== Performances/Results ===
week #	Theme	Song choice	Original artist	Result
Top 14	Contestants Choice	"Undiscovered"	James Morrison	Safe
Top 12	Contestants Choice	"When a Man Loves a Woman"	Percy Sledge	Safe
Top 10	Greatest Hits	"With a Little Help from My Friends"	The Beatles	Safe
Top 9	Crooners and Divas	"Can't Buy Me Love"	The Beatles	Safe
Top 8	New Millennium	"Loves Divine"	Seal	Safe
Top 7	Homegrown	"Great Heart"	Johnny Clegg	Safe
Top 6	Rock	"Lightning Crashes" "Hanging by a Moment"	Live; Lifehouse	Safe
Top 5	Radio DJ Choice; Contestants Choice	"The Living Years" "Signed, Sealed, Delivered I'm Yours"	Mike + The Mechanics; Stevie Wonder	Safe
Top 4	Unplugged	"One (U2 Song)" "(Everything I Do) I Do It for You"	U2; Bryan Adams	Safe
Top 3	Judges' Choice; Producers Choice; Contestants Choice	"Summer Love" "Hey Jude" "(Everything I Do) I Do It for You"	Justin Timberlake; The Beatles; Bryan Adams	Safe
Top 2	Contestant's Choice; Judge's Choice; Coronation Song	"Great Heart" "With A Little Help From My Friends" "Break The Silence"	Johnny Clegg; The Beatles; Jason Hartman	Winner

== Post-Idols ==
=== Misunderstandings ===
After the matter of the votes was resolved many magazines and newspapers managed to twist Jason's comments, making the public believe that he wanted Sasha Lee to give up her prizes and title of co-winner. Jason stated he meant nothing of the sort and that everybody was twisting his own words. Despite this he and Sasha-Lee are still good friends. In mid-May 2009 rumors began to circulate that Jason would not sign his recording deal unless his former band were signed as well. However this was not true with Jason saying: "What a load of crap. I’m performing with my band in the meantime, and will sign my deal. I don’t know where people get this from." He has continued performing with his band and has on various occasions played as a duo with his father, Sam, on two guitars.

=== Success ===
After being declared as joint winner for Idols Jason played many concerts for sold out audiences. Jason's single "Break the Silence" hit the local airwaves and seemed to meet with favorable reviews. The single entered South Africa's newly created chart the Nokia Top 40 SA, peaking at number 1 as of 13 June 2009. The album On the Run was released in October 2009. Jason wrote most of the songs himself and co wrote with his Producer, Marius Brouwer. The single on the Run went to Number 1 on Radio Stations and was rated at Number 28 in the overall 5FM 2009 singles. "Break the Silence" was number 22 on 94.7 for 2009. His video, On The Run, can be viewed on YouTube or Facebook and his website.

== Personal life ==
On 30 June 2011, Jason Hartman performed for the pre-concert before the wedding of Prince Albert II of Monaco with Miss Charlene Wittstock.
