= Bothasig =

Suburban area of the Northern Suburbs of Cape Town

- Location within Western Cape Location within South Africa
- Coordinates: 33°51′34″S 18°32′23″E
- Country: South Africa
- Province: Western Cape
- Municipality: City of Cape Town
- Main Place: Milnerton

Area
  - Total: 4.07 km^{2} (1.57 sq mi)

Population (2011)
  - Total: 11,790
  - Density: 2,900/km^{2} (7,500/sq mi)

Racial makeup (2011)
  - Black African: 6.2%
  - Coloured: 14.1%
  - Indian/Asian: 1.3%
  - White: 76.7%
  - Other: 1.6%

First languages (2011)
  - English: 70.4%
  - Afrikaans: 25.2%
  - Xhosa: 2.0%
  - Other: 2.3%
- Time zone: UTC+2 (SAST)
- Postal code (street): 7441
- PO box: 7406

Bothasig is a northern suburb of the City of Cape Town in Western Cape, South Africa. It is located north of Edgemead and east of Milnerton. It is located approximately 15 km north-east of the Cape Town City Centre.

Developed as a township mainly for Tradesmen/women and their families with a max income of R140 a month and laid out on the farm Bosmansdam, which it was initially named after, but renamed in 1966 after P W Botha, then Minister of Community Development and subsequently Prime Minister and State President of the Republic of South Africa.

Bothasig is an area located toward the west of the province Western Cape in South Africa. The area is very community focused and hosts the Bothasig Football Club (Abe Sher Stadium) alongside the Bothasig Baseball Club.

Bothasig is also known for the wonderful Christmas light displays that some residents decorate their houses with. Even the police station joins in the fun.
