= WrestleMania 38 =

2022 WWE premium live event

- Promotional poster featuring Brock Lesnar and Roman Reigns
- Promotion: WWE
- Brands: Raw; SmackDown
- Date: April 2–3, 2022 (Note: This event was originally set to be held as a one-night event on April 3, 2022, before changing into a two-night event.)
- City: Arlington, Texas
- Venue: AT&T Stadium
- Attendance: Night 1: 65,719; Night 2: 65,653; Combined: 131,372
- Tagline: "The Most Stupendous Two-Night WrestleMania in History"

WWE event chronology
← Previous; NXT Stand & Deliver	Next → WrestleMania Backlash

WrestleMania chronology
← Previous; 37	Next → 39

WrestleMania 38 was a 2022 two-part professional wrestling premium live event (PLE) produced by WWE, held for wrestlers from the promotion's main roster brands, Raw and SmackDown. It was the 38th annual WrestleMania and took place as a two-night event on Saturday, April 2, and Sunday, April 3, 2022, at the AT&T Stadium in the Dallas–Fort Worth metroplex city of Arlington, Texas.

This was the fourth WrestleMania to be held in the U.S. state of Texas, after WrestleMania X-Seven in 2001, WrestleMania 25 in 2009, and WrestleMania 32 in 2016, and the second at AT&T Stadium after the latter. It was the third WrestleMania to feature Brock Lesnar vs. Roman Reigns in the main event, after WrestleMania 31 in 2015 and WrestleMania 34 in 2018. WWE billed the match as "The Biggest WrestleMania Match of All-Time", which was a Winner Takes All match for the promotion's two world championships at the time, Raw's WWE Championship and SmackDown's Universal Championship, which were held by Lesnar and Reigns, respectively, going into the event. This was also the first WrestleMania to livestream on Disney+ Hotstar in Indonesia, after the shutdown of its version of the WWE Network in late January, and it was the first WrestleMania to be branded as a "premium live event", a term the company introduced at the start of the year to refer to its events airing on traditional pay-per-view (PPV) and via WWE's livestreaming platforms. This was also the last WrestleMania in which Vince McMahon, who created the event, had creative control over WWE before his resignation as the company's chairman and chief executive officer later in the year, although he returned the following year in an executive role.

The card comprised a total of 16 matches, with seven on the first night and nine on the second. In an impromptu match that served as the main event for Night 1, "Stone Cold" Steve Austin defeated Kevin Owens in a No Holds Barred match, marking Austin's first match since WrestleMania XIX in 2003 and the final match of his career overall. This encounter had originally been advertised as a special edition of Owens's "KO Show" with Austin as the special guest. Other prominent matches saw the surprise return of Cody Rhodes, who had left WWE in May 2016, defeat Seth "Freakin" Rollins, Charlotte Flair defeated Ronda Rousey to retain the SmackDown Women's Championship, and Bianca Belair defeated Becky Lynch to win the Raw Women's Championship, beginning her record-setting reign of 420 days.

In the main event for Night 2, SmackDown's Universal Champion Roman Reigns defeated Raw's WWE Champion Brock Lesnar to claim both titles and become recognized as the Undisputed WWE Universal Champion. In other prominent matches, Jackass's Johnny Knoxville defeated Sami Zayn in an Anything Goes match and Edge defeated AJ Styles. Night 2 also featured Vince McMahon defeating SmackDown commentator Pat McAfee in an impromptu match after McAfee had defeated Austin Theory, marking McMahon's first match since 2012 and the last match of his career. Also on Night 2, the team of Sasha Banks and Naomi won the WWE Women's Tag Team Championship in a fatal four-way tag team match, which was Banks' final WWE PLE match before she and Naomi legitimately walked out of the company the following month over creative issues; Naomi later returned in January 2024 while Banks, under the ring name Mercedes Moné, wrestled in Japan before signing with rival American company All Elite Wrestling, debuting in March 2024.

The event received mixed-to-positive reviews from critics, who praised the Raw Women's Championship, Raw Tag Team Championship match, Johnny Knoxville vs. Sami Zayn, Edge vs. AJ Styles, Pat McAfee's and Logan Paul's performance, Cody Rhodes vs. Seth "Freakin" Rollins, and the in-ring return of "Stone Cold" Steve Austin, while criticizing the main event for Night 2, Sheamus and Ridge Holland vs. The New Day (Kofi Kingston and Xavier Woods), and panning Vince McMahon vs. McAfee.

== Production ==
=== Background ===
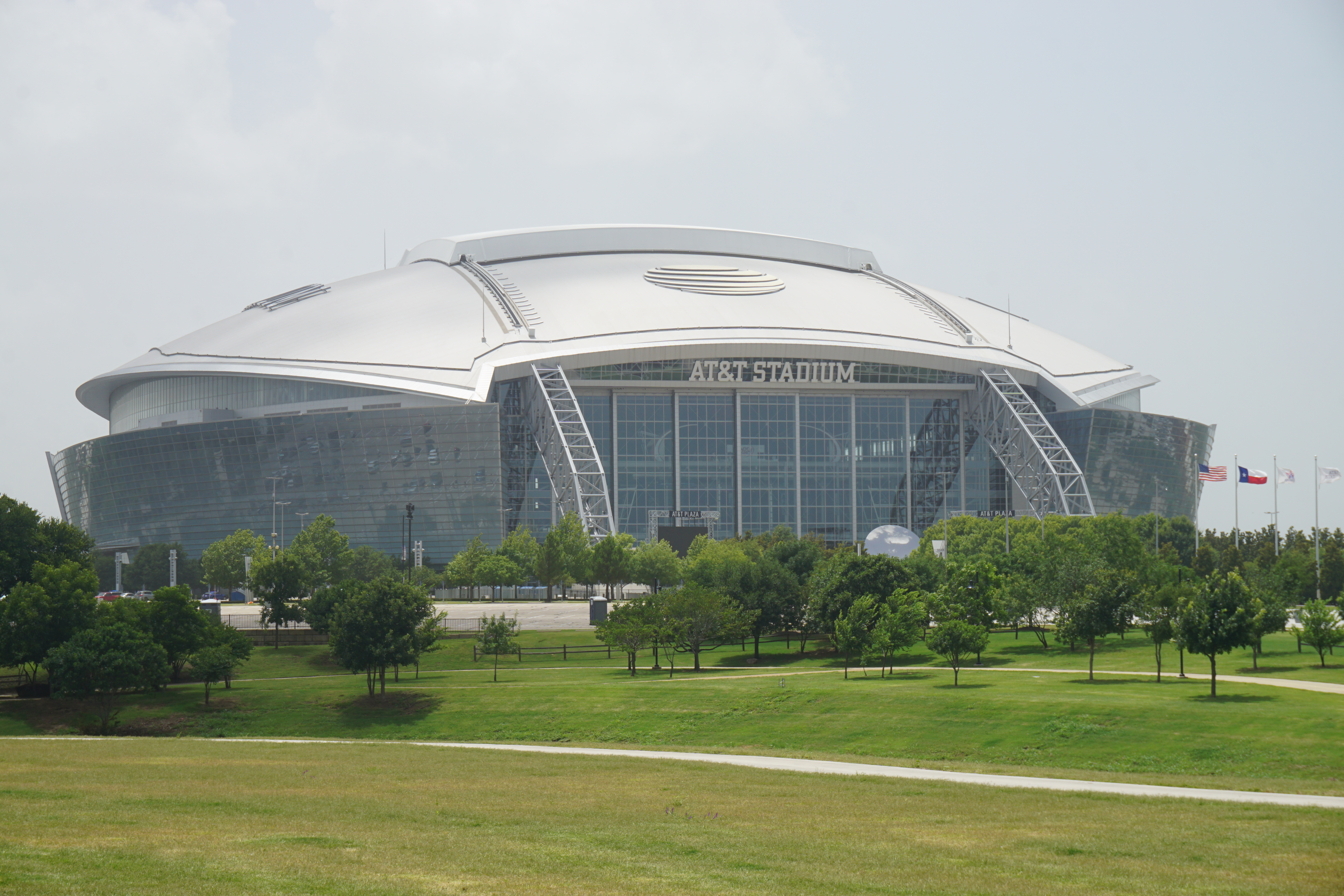
The 38th annual WrestleMania was the second time for WWE's marquee event to be held at AT&T Stadium in Arlington, Texas, after WrestleMania 32 in 2016.

WrestleMania is WWE's flagship professional wrestling premium live event (PLE), having first been held in 1985. It was the company's first pay-per-view (PPV) produced and was also WWE's first major event available via livestreaming when the company launched the WWE Network in February 2014. It is the longest-running professional wrestling event in history and is held annually between mid-March to mid-April. It was the first of WWE's original four PPVs, including Royal Rumble, SummerSlam, and Survivor Series, referred to as the "Big Four", and as of August 2021, it is considered one of the "Big Five", along with Money in the Bank. WrestleMania was ranked the sixth most valuable sports brand in the world by Forbes in 2019, and has been described as the Super Bowl of sports entertainment. Much like the Super Bowl, cities bid for the right to host the year's edition of WrestleMania.

On January 16, 2021, in addition to announcing the date and location change of WrestleMania 37, which had to be rescheduled due to the COVID-19 pandemic, the promotion revealed the dates and locations of the next two WrestleMania events. WrestleMania 38 was announced to be held at AT&T Stadium in the Dallas suburb of Arlington, Texas and feature wrestlers from the promotion's Raw and SmackDown brand divisions. It was originally scheduled to be held solely on April 3, 2022; however, on October 25, 2021, it was revealed that like the previous two WrestleMania events, WrestleMania 38 was expanded to take place over two nights: Saturday, April 2, and Sunday, April 3, 2022. Travel packages became available on November 8, 2021, while general tickets went on sale on November 12. The official theme songs for the event were "Sacrifice" by The Weeknd, "I Feel Good" by Pitbull, Anthony Watts, and DJWS, and "All Nightmare Long" by Metallica.

This was the fourth WrestleMania to be held in the U.S. state of Texas, after WrestleMania X-Seven in 2001, WrestleMania 25 in 2009, and WrestleMania 32 in 2016, and the second to be held at AT&T Stadium, after the latter, which set the attendance record for a WrestleMania event at 101,763, which was, however, disputed. It would also be the second WrestleMania since WrestleMania III at the Pontiac Silverdome in 1987 to be hosted in a FIFA World Cup venue as it is one of the venues hosting matches for the 2026 FIFA World Cup. This was also the first WrestleMania to be branded as a "premium live event", a term the company introduced on January 1 to refer to its events that are available on PPV and via WWE's livestreaming platforms.

=== Broadcast outlets ===
Both nights of WrestleMania 38 were broadcast on traditional pay-per-view worldwide. They were also available to livestream on Peacock in the United States, SonyLIV in India, Disney+ Hotstar in Indonesia, and the WWE Network everywhere else. This was the first WrestleMania to livestream on Disney+ Hotstar in Indonesia, following the shutdown of its version of the WWE Network in late January. Additionally, WWE partnered with Fathom Events to air both nights of WrestleMania 38 in movie theaters across the United States.

=== Celebrity involvement ===
Celebrities from the entertainment field took part in the event in various capacities. Social media personality Logan Paul, who appeared at WrestleMania 37, participated in a tag team match on WrestleMania Saturday, teaming with The Miz against The Mysterios (Rey Mysterio and Dominik Mysterio). Jackass actor and stuntman Johnny Knoxville competed in an Anything Goes match against Sami Zayn on WrestleMania Sunday. The Dallas Cowboy Cheerleaders also appeared on stage to cheer Pat McAfee to the ring for his match against Austin Theory on WrestleMania Sunday. Additionally, country music singers Brantley Gilbert and Jessie James Decker performed "America the Beautiful" to open the event on Saturday and Sunday night, respectively, while DJ Valentino Khan had musical performances on both nights.

=== Other WrestleMania Week events ===
As part of the WrestleMania festivities during the week of the event, WWE held a number of events throughout the week. The week kicked off with a special "WrestleMania Edition" of Monday Night Raw, held at the PPG Paints Arena in Pittsburgh, Pennsylvania. The night before WrestleMania 38 on April 1, WWE kicked off WrestleMania Weekend itself with a special "WrestleMania Edition" of Friday Night SmackDown, which hosted the André the Giant Memorial Battle Royal, won by Madcap Moss (Note: Order of elimination: Akira Tozawa, Reggie, R-Truth, Jinder Mahal, T-Bar, Drew Gulak, Cedric Alexander, Shelton Benjamin, Mansoor, Apollo Crews, Ivar, Erik, Commander Azeez, Shanky, Damian Priest, Tommaso Ciampa, Robert Roode, Dolph Ziggler, and Finn Bálor.), as well as a triple threat match for the Intercontinental Championship. Immediately after SmackDown, the 2022 WWE Hall of Fame induction ceremony commenced. The day of WrestleMania Saturday, WWE's NXT brand held its annual WrestleMania Week event, Stand & Deliver, which aired at 1:00 p.m. Eastern Time. WrestleMania Week concluded with the Raw after WrestleMania on April 4. All of the weekend events were held live from the American Airlines Center in Dallas.

=== Storylines ===
The event consisted of 16 matches, with seven on the first night and nine on the second, that resulted from scripted storylines. Results were predetermined by WWE's writers on the Raw and SmackDown brands, while storylines were produced on WWE's weekly television shows, Monday Night Raw and Friday Night SmackDown.

==== Main event matches ====
For many years, Paul Heyman had been the advocate for Brock Lesnar. After Lesnar took a hiatus following WrestleMania 36 in April 2020, Heyman became the special counsel for Roman Reigns that August, guiding him to win SmackDown's Universal Championship. After Reigns retained the title at SummerSlam in August 2021, Lesnar returned to WWE and confronted Reigns, also implying that Heyman was still his advocate. Two months later at Crown Jewel, Reigns defeated Lesnar to retain the Universal Championship with help from The Usos (Jey Uso and Jimmy Uso). A rematch was scheduled for the New Year's event Day 1, and Reigns fired Heyman as he believed Heyman was working with Lesnar behind his back. The Day 1 match, however, was canceled as Reigns tested positive for COVID-19. Due to his status as a free agent, Lesnar was instead added to Raw's multi-person WWE Championship match at Day 1 and won the title. On the following Raw, Lesnar reunited with Heyman. On that week's SmackDown, Lesnar challenged Reigns to a champion vs. champion match, but Reigns declined. At the Royal Rumble, Lesnar lost his WWE Championship after interference from Reigns and a double cross from Heyman, who realigned with Reigns. Later that night, Lesnar entered the Royal Rumble match and won to earn himself a world championship match of his choice at WrestleMania 38. On the following episode of Raw, Lesnar announced that he would challenge Reigns for the Universal Championship. Still wanting it to be a champion vs. champion match, and also wanting a rematch for losing his title, Lesnar was also added to the WWE Championship Elimination Chamber match at Elimination Chamber, which he won. With Reigns also retaining his title at the Royal Rumble and Elimination Chamber, it was confirmed that their WrestleMania match would be a Winner Takes All match for the WWE Championship and Universal Championship. On the following episode of SmackDown during the contract signing for the match, it was further stipulated as a Championship Unification match, and scheduled for the main event of Night 2.

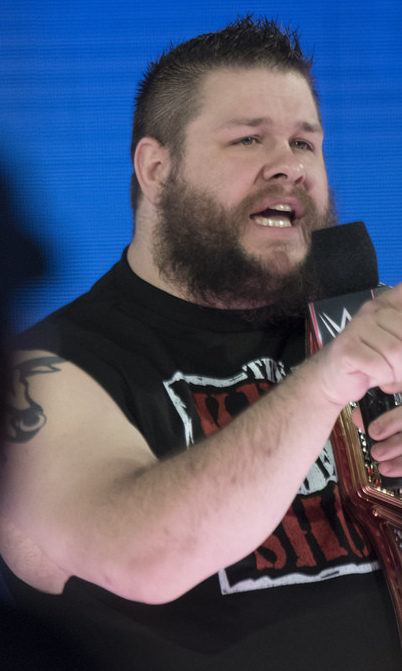
After failing to obtain a spot on the WrestleMania card, Kevin Owens invited "Stone Cold" Steve Austin on the "KO Show" at WrestleMania 38 that led to a match.

After weeks of disrespecting the state of Texas, on the March 7 episode of Raw, Kevin Owens invited the "Texas Rattlesnake", "Stone Cold" Steve Austin, as a special guest on the "KO Show" at WrestleMania 38. A day later, Austin accepted and it was announced that the segment would occur on WrestleMania Saturday.

==== Undercard matches ====
On the February 25 episode of SmackDown, Sasha Banks and Naomi announced that they were challenging Queen Zelina and Carmella for the WWE Women's Tag Team Championship at WrestleMania 38. On the next episode of Raw, Carmella and Zelina accepted. On March 4, the match was scheduled for Night 2. Rhea Ripley and Liv Morgan were added to the match after they defeated Zelina and Carmella in a non-title match on the March 7 episode of Raw, and on the March 18 episode of SmackDown, Shayna Baszler and Natalya were also added to the match after they caused a match pitting Banks and Naomi against Ripley and Morgan to end in a no-contest, making the match a fatal four-way tag team match.

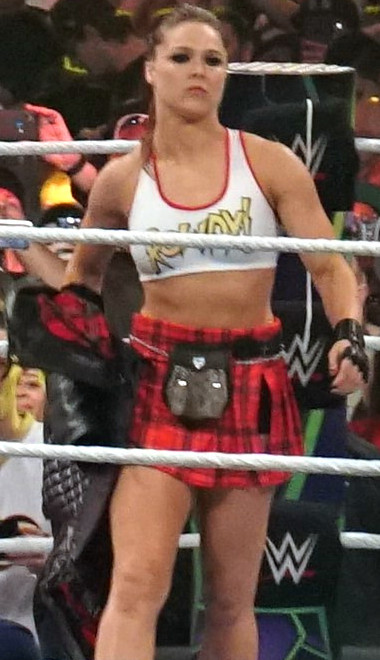
Ronda Rousey won the 2022 Women's Royal Rumble match and chose to challenge Charlotte Flair for the SmackDown Women's Championship at WrestleMania 38.

At the Royal Rumble, Ronda Rousey, in her first appearance since WrestleMania 35 in April 2019, made a surprise return and won the women's Royal Rumble match to earn a women's championship match of her choice at WrestleMania 38. After pondering her choices due to having heated history with both reigning champions, on the following episode of SmackDown, Rousey announced that she would challenge Charlotte Flair for the SmackDown Women's Championship. On February 24, the match was scheduled for Night 1.

At SummerSlam in August 2021, Becky Lynch, who had been on maternity leave since May 2020, made a surprise return and defeated Bianca Belair in an impromptu match to win the SmackDown Women's Championship in 26 seconds. Over the course of the next month, Lynch would continue to retain the championship against Belair using underhanded tactics before both were drafted to Raw in the 2021 WWE Draft; Lynch and Raw Women's Champion Charlotte Flair, who was drafted to SmackDown, traded their championships to keep the titles on their respective brands, thus Lynch became the Raw Women's Champion. After Belair failed to earn a title shot at the 2022 Royal Rumble and also failing to win the women's Royal Rumble match, Belair won the women's Elimination Chamber match at Elimination Chamber to become the number one contender for the Raw Women's Championship at WrestleMania 38. Later that same event, Lynch retained the title, keeping her as the defending champion heading into her match against Belair at WrestleMania 38. This in turn scheduled the only two women to win in the main event of WrestleMania against each other at WrestleMania (Lynch at WrestleMania 35 and Belair at Night 1 of WrestleMania 37, respectively). On February 28, the match was scheduled for Night 1.

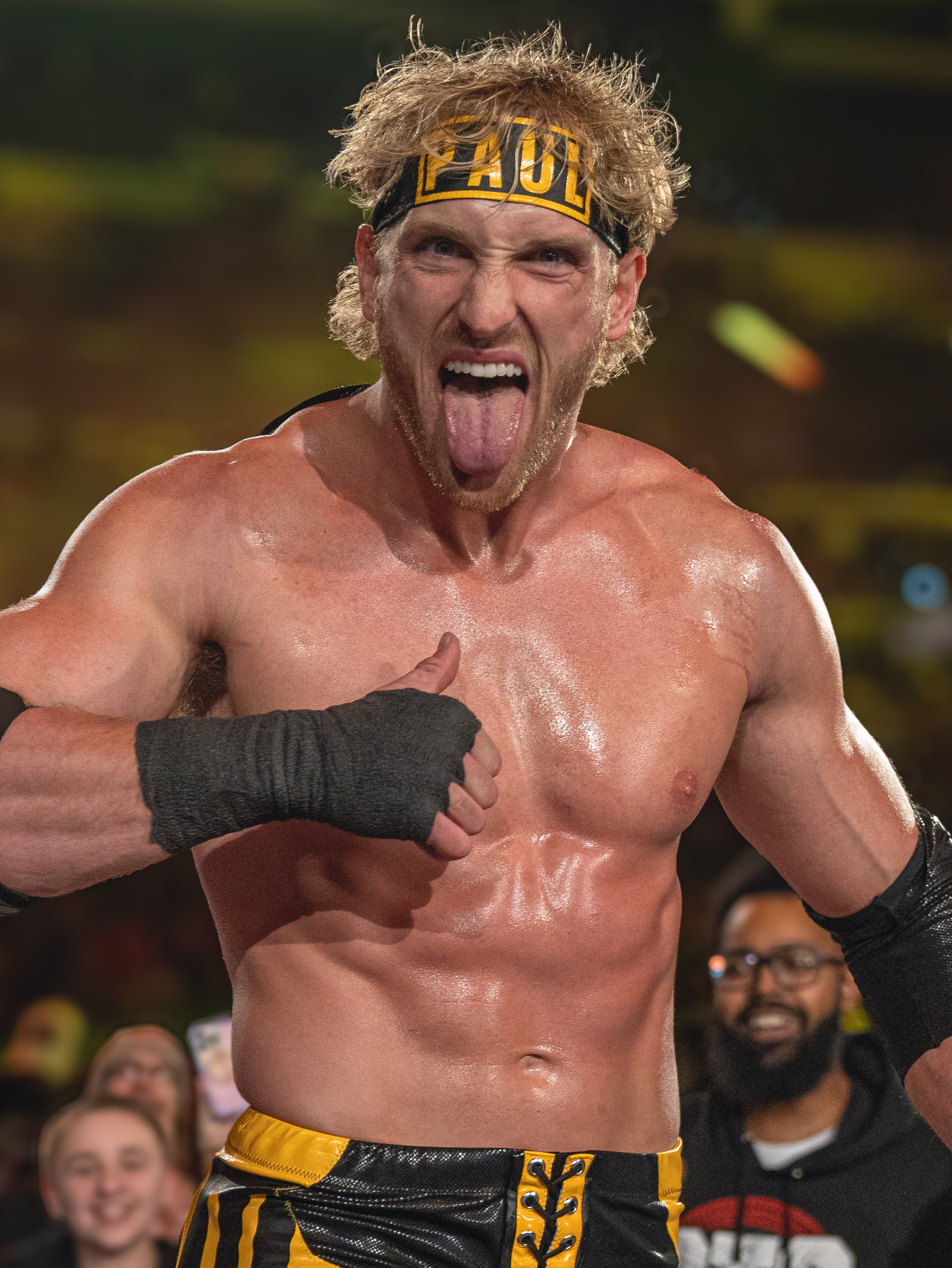
YouTuber, boxer, and Internet personality Logan Paul teamed up with The Miz to face The Mysterios (Rey Mysterio and Dominik Mysterio) at WrestleMania 38.

On the January 31 episode of Raw, The Miz defeated Dominik Mysterio. The following week, Dominik and his father Rey Mysterio were guests on "Miz TV". Rey claimed that Miz cheated to defeat Dominik while Miz took issue that Rey had an opportunity to qualify for the WWE Championship Elimination Chamber match while he did not and also that Rey was the cover star of the WWE 2K22 video game. Miz also questioned if Rey was truly Dominik's dad, referencing the child custody battle that Rey had with Eddie Guerrero back at SummerSlam in 2005. Dominik then defeated Miz in a rematch. Rey then defeated Miz during the Elimination Chamber Kickoff pre-show. Later backstage, Miz accused Rey of cheating due to Dominik and said he would find a tag team partner who was a "global superstar". On the following episode of Raw, as Miz teased the identity of his partner to face Rey and Dominik at WrestleMania 38, The Mysterios interrupted, stating it did not matter who Miz had chosen. Miz then revealed his partner as social media personality Logan Paul, after which, Miz and Paul attacked The Mysterios. On February 28, Miz confirmed via Twitter that the match would take place on Night 1.

On the February 21 episode of Raw, Edge made his first post-Royal Rumble appearance where he issued an open challenge for WrestleMania 38. The following week, Edge came out to see who would answer his challenge, which was accepted by AJ Styles. Edge then stated he was glad Styles accepted as it was a match he had been wanting; however, he wanted the "pitbull" AJ Styles who reigned as WWE Champion, not the AJ Styles who had been Omos's tag team partner for the majority of the prior year. Edge then turned heel and attacked Styles, after which, a conflicted Edge performed two con-chair-tos on Styles. On the March 7 episode, the match was scheduled for Night 2.

On March 3, 2022, WWE Chairman and chief executive officer Vince McMahon made a rare media appearance for a live interview on The Pat McAfee Show. During the interview, McMahon offered Pat McAfee a match at WrestleMania 38. McAfee has primarily served as the color commentator on SmackDown, but gladly accepted and McMahon stated that he would find him an opponent. On the following night's episode of SmackDown, Raw's Austin Theory, who had been under the tutelage of McMahon for several weeks, revealed himself as McAfee's opponent at WrestleMania 38. This marked McAfee's first match since NXT TakeOver: WarGames in December 2020. On March 7, the match was scheduled for Night 2.

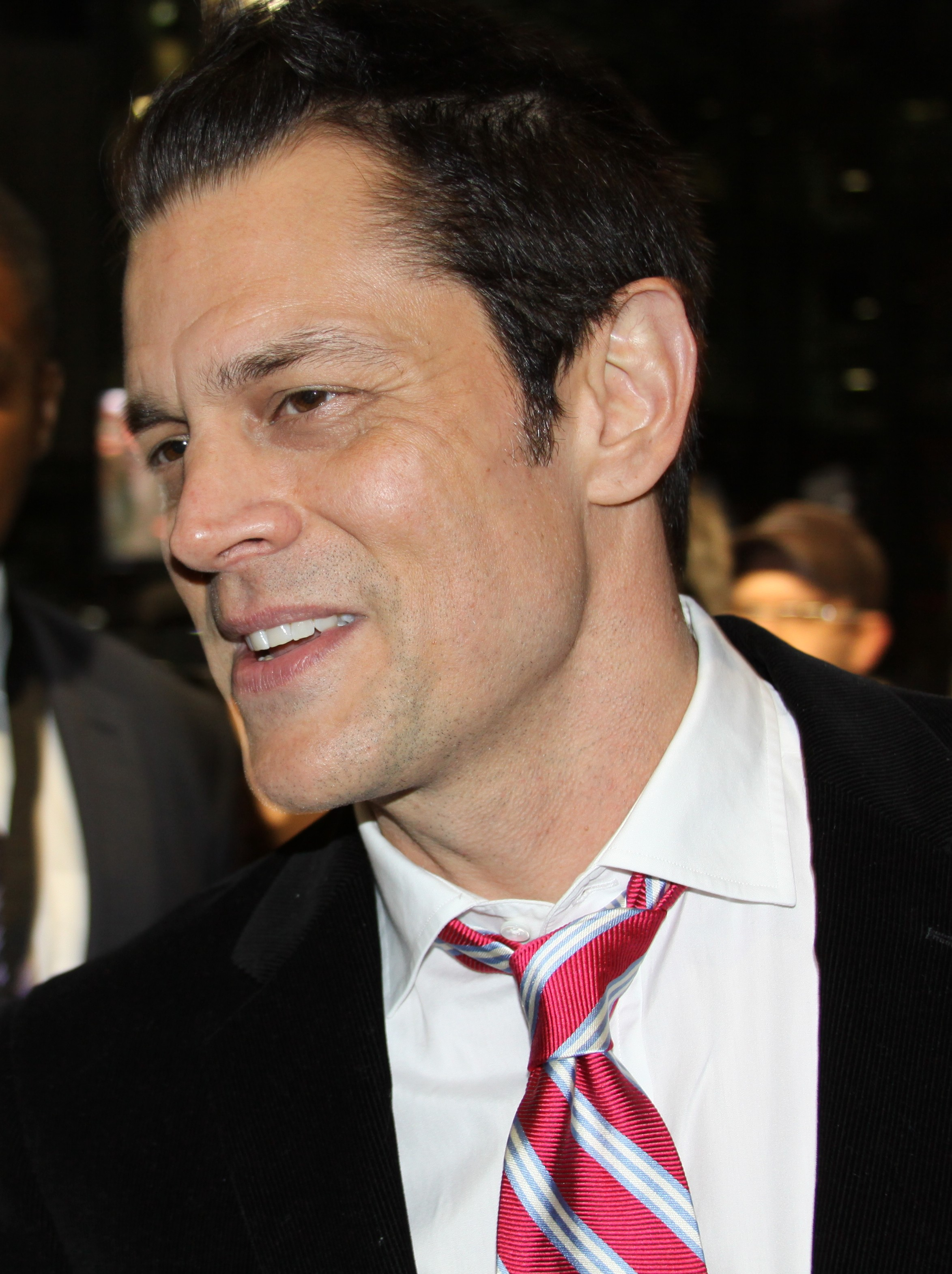
Jackass actor and stuntman Johnny Knoxville took on Sami Zayn in an Anything Goes match

On January 1, Jackass actor and stuntman Johnny Knoxville announced that he would be participating in the men's Royal Rumble match. Sami Zayn took issue of this, claiming that Knoxville was not qualified to compete, nor did he earn the opportunity. After Zayn lost his match on the following SmackDown, Knoxville ran down to the ring and threw Zayn over the top rope, and ring announcer Mike Rome then announced that Knoxville had officially qualified for the Royal Rumble match, much to Zayn's displeasure. The two faced off in the Royal Rumble match where Zayn eliminated Knoxville. After Zayn had invited himself to the red carpet premiere of Jackass Forever, for which he was kicked out, Knoxville then invited himself to Zayn's celebration for winning the Intercontinental Championship. Knoxville challenged Zayn for the title at WrestleMania 38, but Zayn declined. During Zayn's championship defense on the March 4 episode, Knoxville distracted Zayn, costing him the title. An enraged Zayn then challenged Knoxville to a match at WrestleMania 38, which Knoxville accepted. The match was subsequently scheduled for Night 2. After Knoxville shared Zayn's phone number, causing a multitude of people attempting to contact Zayn, Zayn changed the stipulation to an Anything Goes match, and Knoxville accepted.

In late 2021, Drew McIntyre began feuding with Happy Corbin and Madcap Moss. At Day 1, McIntyre defeated Moss. Later that night, however, Corbin and Moss attacked McIntyre backstage. McIntyre was reported to have surgery on his neck, but he returned at the Royal Rumble where he eliminated Moss and Corbin. McIntyre then defeated Moss in a Falls Count Anywhere match at Elimination Chamber. On the following SmackDown, McIntyre was scheduled to face Corbin, but Corbin and Moss attacked McIntyre, leading to McIntyre facing Moss again, which McIntyre won. On March 3, a match between McIntyre and Corbin was scheduled for Night 1 of WrestleMania 38.

For weeks, Seth "Freakin" Rollins attempted to get a spot at WrestleMania. After failing to defeat Kevin Owens and AJ Styles to take their respective spots, Vince McMahon summoned Rollins into his office on the morning of March 28. McMahon stated that he would choose an opponent for Rollins to face at WrestleMania 38 and the opponent would be revealed at the event itself while Rollins was waiting in the ring on WrestleMania Saturday.

On the March 7 episode of Raw, RK-Bro (Randy Orton and Riddle) defeated the teams of Kevin Owens and Seth "Freakin" Rollins and defending champions Alpha Academy (Otis and Chad Gable) in a triple threat tag team match to win the Raw Tag Team Championship and secure a spot at WrestleMania 38. The following week, The Street Profits (Angelo Dawkins and Montez Ford) interrupted RK-Bro's celebration, leading to a singles match between Ford and Riddle, which ended in a no-contest after interference from Alpha Academy. On March 21, a triple threat tag team match between RK-Bro, Alpha Academy, and The Street Profits for the Raw Tag Team Championship was scheduled for Night 2 of WrestleMania 38.

On the March 4 episode of SmackDown, prior to The Usos's (Jey Uso and Jimmy Uso) successful SmackDown Tag Team Championship defense, they attacked Shinsuke Nakamura and Rick Boogs on the stage before introducing Universal Champion Roman Reigns. The following week, Boogs defeated Jey in a singles match, resulting in Boogs and Nakamura becoming the new number one contenders for the SmackDown Tag Team Championship at WrestleMania 38. On March 12, the match was scheduled for Night 1.

On the February 25 episode of SmackDown, after The New Day (Kofi Kingston and Big E) won their match, they were confronted by Sheamus and Ridge Holland backstage. On the March 4 episode, Big E was scheduled to face Sheamus, but the match never began as Big E and Kingston were attacked by Sheamus and Holland, who then drove off on The New Day's ATV and destroyed it with sledgehammers. The following week, Sheamus and Holland introduced Pete Dunne, who was subsequently renamed "Butch". Later that night, Kingston and Big E lost to Holland and Sheamus; during the match, Holland performed an overhead belly-to-belly suplex on Big E at ringside, resulting in Big E landing on the top of his head. Big E was taken out of the arena on a stretcher and sent to a hospital, where he revealed the severity of his injuries were. On the March 18 episode, Sheamus and Butch helped Holland defeat Kingston in a singles match. The following week, Xavier Woods, who recovered from an injury he suffered in mid-January, defeated Holland. On March 28, a match pitting Sheamus and Holland against Kingston and Woods was scheduled for Night 1 of WrestleMania 38. However, the match was cut from Night 1 due to time, and was rescheduled to Night 2.

On the March 28 episode of Raw, following Omos's match, Omos was interviewed about who could challenge him next when Bobby Lashley, in his first appearance since Elimination Chamber, appeared. Lashley and Omos then engaged in a brawl, which ended when Lashley managed to knock Omos off his feet. Later that night, a match between the two was made official for Night 2 of WrestleMania 38.

== Event ==
=== Night 1 ===
Other on-screen personnel – Saturday
Role	Name
English commentators	Michael Cole (SmackDown)
English commentators	Pat McAfee (SmackDown)
English commentators	Jimmy Smith (Raw)
English commentators	Corey Graves (Raw)
English commentators	Byron Saxton (Raw)
Portuguese commentators	Marco Alfaro
Portuguese commentators	Roberto Figueroa
Spanish commentators	Marcelo Rodriguez
Spanish commentators	Jerry Soto
Ring announcers	Mike Rome (Raw)
Ring announcers	Samantha Irvin (SmackDown)
Referees	Danilo Anfibio
Referees	Jessika Carr
Referees	Daphanie LaShaunn
Referees	Eddie Orengo
Referees	Charles Robinson
Referees	Ryan Tran
Referees	Rod Zapata
Interviewers	Maria Menounos
Interviewers	Jackie Redmond
Pre-show panel	Kayla Braxton
Pre-show panel	Kevin Patrick
Pre-show panel	Peter Rosenberg
Pre-show panel	Booker T
Pre-show panel	John "Bradshaw" Layfield
Pre-show panel	Jerry Lawler
Pre-show panel	Akbar Gbaja-Biamila

==== Preliminary matches ====
WrestleMania Saturday opened with The Usos (Jey Uso and Jimmy Uso) defending the SmackDown Tag Team Championship against Shinsuke Nakamura and Rick Boogs. During the match, Boogs legitimately injured his right knee after attempting to lift both of The Usos on his shoulders. As Nakamura attempted to perform a Kinshasa on Jey, Jey countered with a Superkick. Jey tagged in Jimmy, who performed an Uso Splash on Nakamura for a nearfall. In the end, The Usos performed the 1D on Nakamura to retain the titles. Following the match, medical personnel tended to Boogs.

Next, Drew McIntyre faced Happy Corbin (accompanied by Madcap Moss). Corbin dominated most of the match until McIntyre performed a suicide dive on Corbin and Moss. McIntyre performed a suplex on Moss before returning to the ring. In the climax, Corbin performed an End of Days on McIntyre for a nearfall, which was the first time that anyone kicked out of the End of Days. Following this, McIntyre performed a Future Shock DDT and a Claymore Kick on Corbin to win the match. Following the match, after Moss attempted to enter the ring, McIntyre stopped him with his sword and swung his sword toward Moss, slicing the top and middle ring ropes in the process.

In the third match, Rey Mysterio and Dominik Mysterio took on The Miz and Logan Paul. Throughout the match, Paul disrespected Eddie Guerrero by successfully performing the Three Amigos and Frog Splash on Rey. In the end, after Rey and Dominik performed a double 619 and frog splashes on Paul, Miz tagged himself in, slammed Dominik on Rey, and performed a Skull Crushing Finale on Rey to win the match. After the match, Miz turned on Paul and performed a Skull Crushing Finale on him.

Next, WWE executive Stephanie McMahon came out and thanked the fans in attendance. She then introduced WWE's newest signee, Olympic gold medalist Gable Steveson.

In the fourth match, Becky Lynch defended the Raw Women's Championship against Bianca Belair. About one minute in the match, Lynch performed a Man-Handle Slam on Belair for a nearfall. During the match, Lynch applied the Dis-Arm-Her on Belair, who reached the ring ropes to void the submission. In the climax, Lynch performed a Man-Handle Slam on Belair on top of the steel stairs. Lynch then entered the ring hoping for a count out victory, however, Belair managed to enter the ring at the last second. Lynch attempted the Manhandle Slam again, but Belair countered by kicking off the middle turnbuckle and performed the Kiss of Death on Lynch to win the title.

Next, Seth "Freakin" Rollins came out for his match against an opponent who was pre-selected by Mr. McMahon. After Rollins waited impatiently, former All Elite Wrestling wrestler Cody Rhodes made his return to WWE as Rollins' opponent; Rhodes last performed in WWE in 2016 under the gimmick of Stardust. This was a back-and-forth match. Rollins performed the Pedigree on Rhodes for a near fall. Rhodes performed the Cross Rhodes on Rollins for a near fall. In the end, Rhodes performed two Cross Rhodes, the Bionic Elbow as a tribute to his father, Dusty Rhodes, and a third Cross Rhodes on Rollins to win the match.

Following the match, the WWE Hall of Fame Class of 2022 were honored: The Undertaker, Queen Sharmell, and The Steiner Brothers (Rick Steiner and Scott Steiner) were introduced to the crowd, while posthumous inductees Vader and Warrior Award recipient Shad Gaspard were represented by family members.

In the penultimate match, Charlotte Flair defended the SmackDown Women's Championship against Ronda Rousey. During the match, Rousey applied the Armbar and Ankle lock on Flair, however, Flair escaped. Rousey performed a Piper's Pit on Flair, however, Flair placed her foot on the bottom rope to void the pin attempt. In the closing moments, as Flair attempted the Figure-four leglock, Rousey countered by kicking Flair toward the referee, inadvertently incapacitating the referee. While the referee was down, Rousey applied the Armbar on Flair, who tapped out, however, the referee was still incapacitated. As Rousey attempted to revive the referee, Flair performed a Big Boot on Rousey to retain the title, ending Rousey's undefeated streak in singles matches.

==== Main event ====
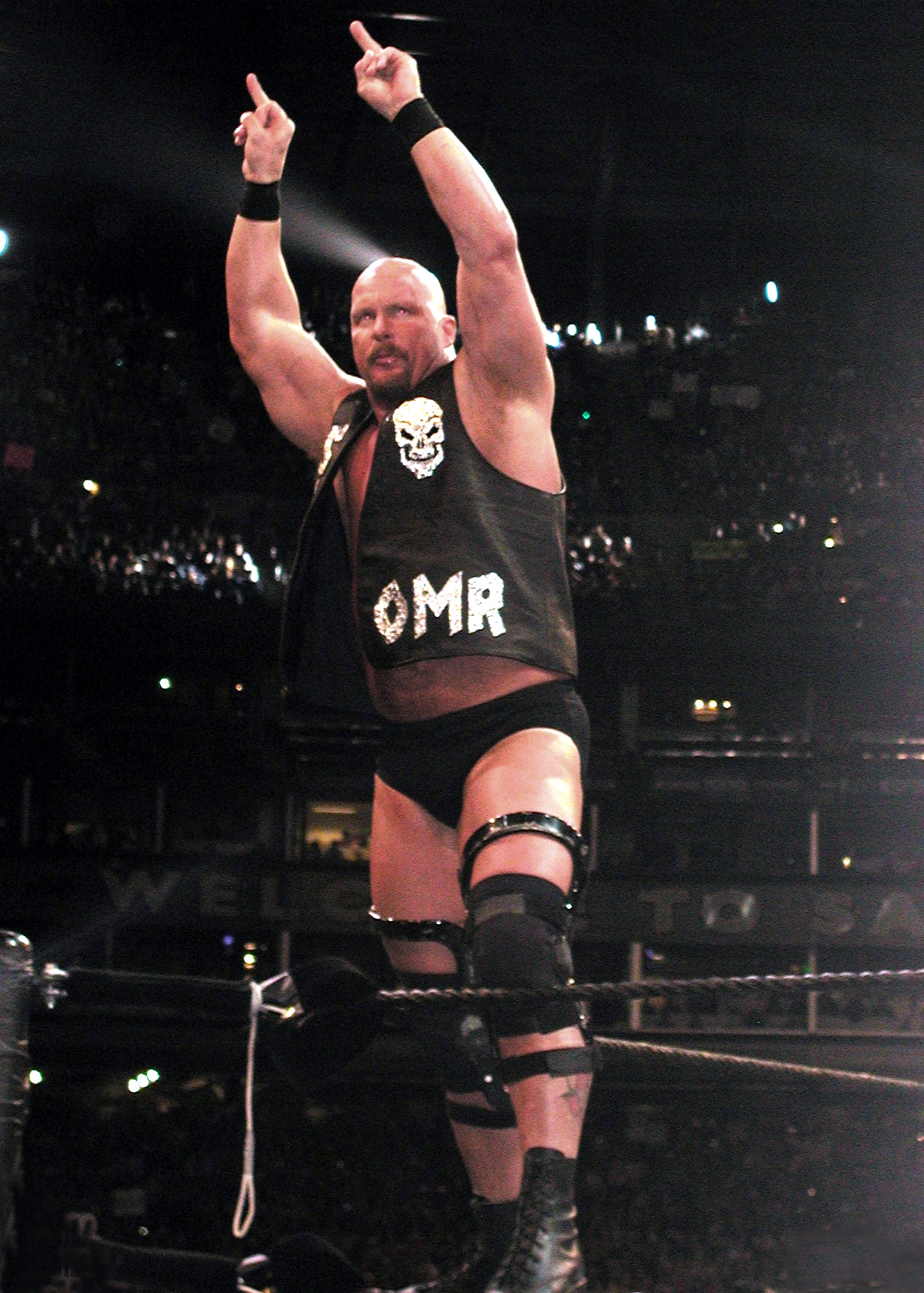
In the main event of Night 1, "Stone Cold" Steve Austin defeated Kevin Owens in a No Holds Barred match. This was also his first professional wrestling match since WrestleMania XIX in 2003.

In the main event, Kevin Owens came out to host a special edition of the "KO Show" with special guest "Stone Cold" Steve Austin. This was Austin's first WrestleMania appearance since WrestleMania 32 in 2016, coincidentally also in the same venue. During the segment, Owens claimed that he lied to Austin about having him as a guest and actually wanted to challenge Austin to a No Holds Barred match. Austin accepted, thus marking his first match since WrestleMania XIX in 2003. During the match, Austin and Owens fought in the crowd and Austin constantly taunted Owens by pouring cans of beer on Owens. Owens performed a Stunner on Austin for a nearfall. In the end, after Owens accidentally hit himself in the head with a chair (due to it bouncing off the ring ropes when Austin ducked), Austin performed a Stone Cold Stunner on Owens to win the match. Following the match, Austin performed a second Stunner on Owens, who was escorted out by Texas State Police. Austin then celebrated with commentator Byron Saxton, after which, he performed a Stunner on Saxton. Austin then celebrated with his brother to close out WrestleMania Saturday.

=== Night 2 ===
Other on-screen personnel – Sunday
Role	Name
English commentators	Michael Cole (SmackDown/Main event)
English commentators	Pat McAfee (SmackDown)
English commentators	Jimmy Smith (Raw)
English commentators	Corey Graves (Raw/Main event)
English commentators	Byron Saxton (Raw/The New Day vs. Sheamus & Holland/McAfee vs. Theory/McAfee vs. McMahon)
Portuguese commentators	Marco Alfaro
Portuguese commentators	Roberto Figueroa
Spanish commentators	Marcelo Rodriguez
Spanish commentators	Jerry Soto
Ring announcers	Mike Rome (Raw/Main event)
Ring announcers	Samantha Irvin (SmackDown)
Referees	Danilo Anfibio
Referees	Jason Ayers
Referees	Shawn Bennett
Referees	Jessika Carr
Referees	Dan Engler
Referees	Chad Patton
Referees	Ryan Tran
Referees	Rod Zapata
Interviewers	Maria Menounos
Interviewers	Jackie Redmond
Pre-show panel	Kayla Braxton
Pre-show panel	Kevin Patrick
Pre-show panel	Peter Rosenberg
Pre-show panel	Booker T
Pre-show panel	Jerry Lawler
Pre-show panel	John "Bradshaw" Layfield

==== Preliminary matches ====
WrestleMania Sunday opened with WWE executive Triple H making an appearance. Triple H, who nine days prior had announced his retirement from wrestling due to a cardiac event, welcomed the fans to the second night of WrestleMania and symbolically left his wrestling boots in the center of the ring.

In the first match, RK-Bro (Randy Orton and Riddle) defended the Raw Tag Team Championship against Alpha Academy (Chad Gable and Otis) and The Street Profits (Montez Ford and Angelo Dawkins) in a triple threat tag team match. In the closing moments, after an evenly contested match between the three teams, Dawkins performed a suicide dive on Otis outside the ring. Ford attempted a From the Heavens on Orton, however, Riddle performed an RKO on Ford. Orton then performed an RKO on Gable, who was mid-air, to retain the titles. Following the match, RK-Bro and The Street Profits shared a drink alongside recent WWE signee, Gable Steveson. Chad Gable took offense to Steveson and slapped the drink out of Steveson's hand. This prompted Steveson to perform a belly-to-belly suplex on Gable, after which, Steveson celebrated with RK-Bro and Street Profits with a toast.

Next, Bobby Lashley faced Omos. Omos dominated Lashley almost throughout the entire match. In the closing moments, Lashley performed a vertical suplex and two spears on Omos to win the match, ending Omos' undefeated streak.

In the third match, Sami Zayn faced Johnny Knoxville in an Anything Goes match. At the start of the match, Zayn performed a helluva kick on Knoxville. Outside the ring, Knoxville obtained a fire extinguisher and sprayed it on Zayn. Zayn performed an exploder suplex on Knoxville through a table positioned in one corner of the ring. Later in the match, Zayn was attacked by a number of Knoxville's Jackass co-stars, including Wee-Man, who performed a bodyslam on Zayn. Knoxville knocked Zayn, who was perched atop a turnbuckle, onto a table. In the end, Knoxville and his allies obtained a large mouse trap from underneath the ring and trapped Zayn in the mouse trap. Knoxville pinned the trapped Zayn to win the match.

Next, Queen Zelina and Carmella defended the WWE Women's Tag Team Championship against Sasha Banks and Naomi, Natalya and Shayna Baszler, and Rhea Ripley and Liv Morgan in a fatal four-way tag team match. In the end, Banks and Naomi performed a Wheel Barrow/Double knee combo on Carmella to win the titles for the first time as a team, the first time for Naomi, and a record-tying third time for Banks. This also marked Banks' first win at WrestleMania since making her WrestleMania debut at WrestleMania 32 in 2016 in the same venue, ending her six loss streak.

The fifth match was between Edge and AJ Styles. Styles kicked Edge off the apron and into the steel steps. As Styles attempted for a springboard 450° splash on Edge, Edge raised his knees. Styles performed a suplex on Edge into a turnbuckle. Styles performed a Rack Bomb on Edge for a nearfall. Edge performed a DDT on Styles for a nearfall. Edge performed a powerbomb on Styles. Styles performed a superplex from the top rope and followed up with a springboard 450° splash and a Styles Clash on Edge for a nearfall. In the end, as Styles attempted a Phenomenal Forearm on Edge, Damian Priest emerged to momentarily distract Styles, allowing Edge to perform a spear on Styles to win the match. Following the match, Edge and Priest celebrated the victory, leading into the formation of Judgment Day.

In the sixth match, Sheamus and Ridge Holland (accompanied by Butch) faced The New Day (Kofi Kingston and Xavier Woods). Outside the ring, Sheamus performed a Brogue Kick on Kingston. After that, Sheamus performed another Brogue Kick on Woods inside the ring, and Holland performed the Northern Grit on Woods to win the match.

After this, Class of 2022 WWE Hall of Fame inductee The Undertaker came out for one more appearance to acknowledge the crowd before departing backstage.

Next, Mr McMahon came out to watch the match between Austin Theory and Pat McAfee. During the match, McAfee performed a hurricanrana on Theory for a nearfall. Theory and McAfee performed suplexes on each other. Outside the ring, McAfee poured a drink on Theory. McAfee performed a superplex off the top rope on Theory. In the end, McAfee countered an ATL from Theory with a roll-up to win the match.

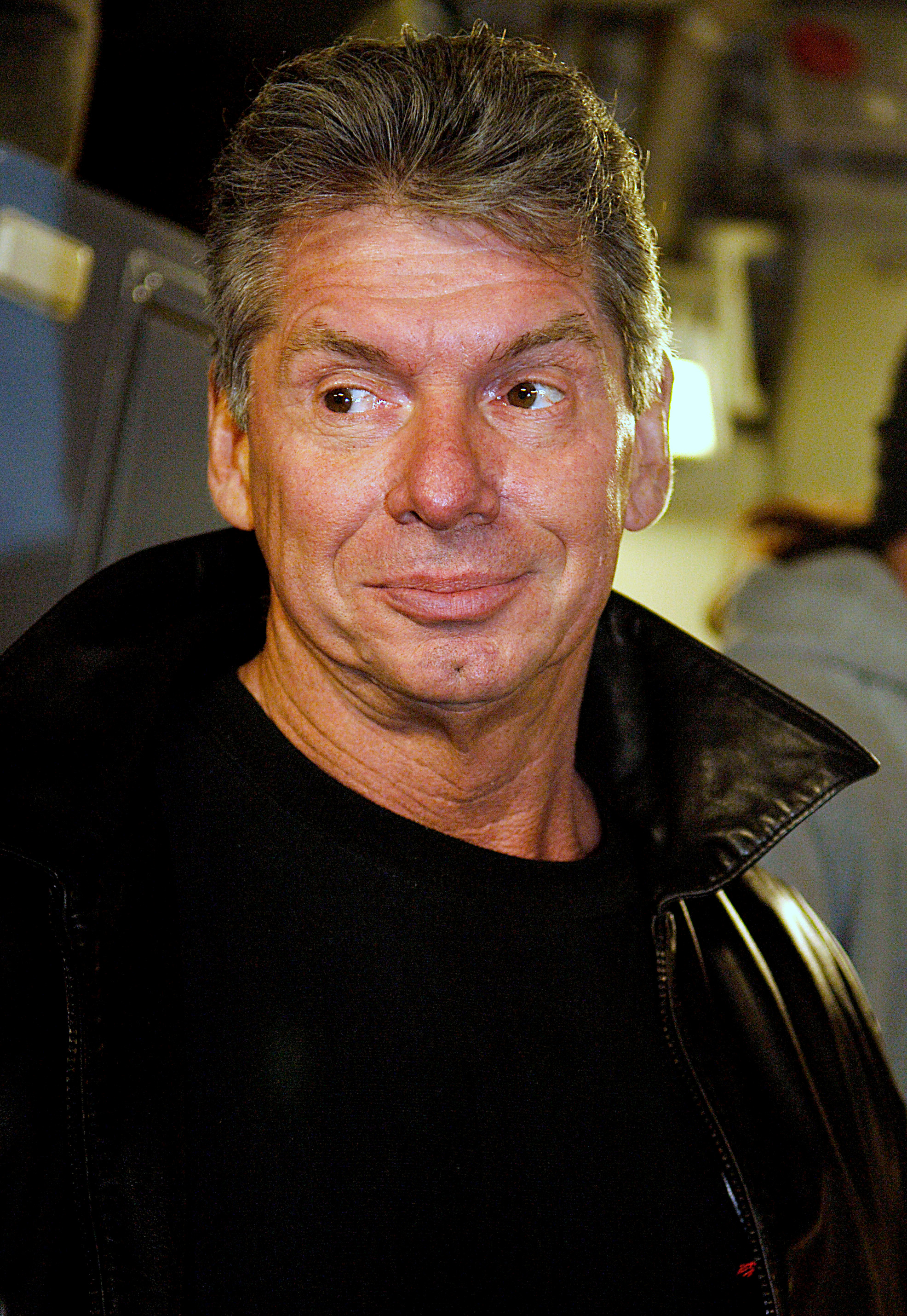
At 76 years old, Vince McMahon became the oldest person to compete and win at WrestleMania.

Following the match, McAfee called out Mr. McMahon, followed by the latter removing his suit before heading into the ring for an impromptu match, marking McMahon's first match since October 2012 and first WrestleMania match since WrestleMania XXVI in 2010. It would also be his final match before he announced his first retirement on July 22, before officially retiring the following year following a federal investigation. Before the match began, Theory attacked McAfee. McMahon kicked a Dallas Cowboys football at McAfee's face before pinning him to win the match. At 76 years old, this made McMahon the oldest person to compete, and win, at WrestleMania. Following the impromptu match, "Stone Cold" Steve Austin made a surprise appearance and performed a stunner on Theory. After sharing beers with McMahon, Austin performed a Stunner on McMahon. Austin then signaled for McAfee and celebrated with him, after which, Austin performed a Stunner on McAfee.

==== Main event ====
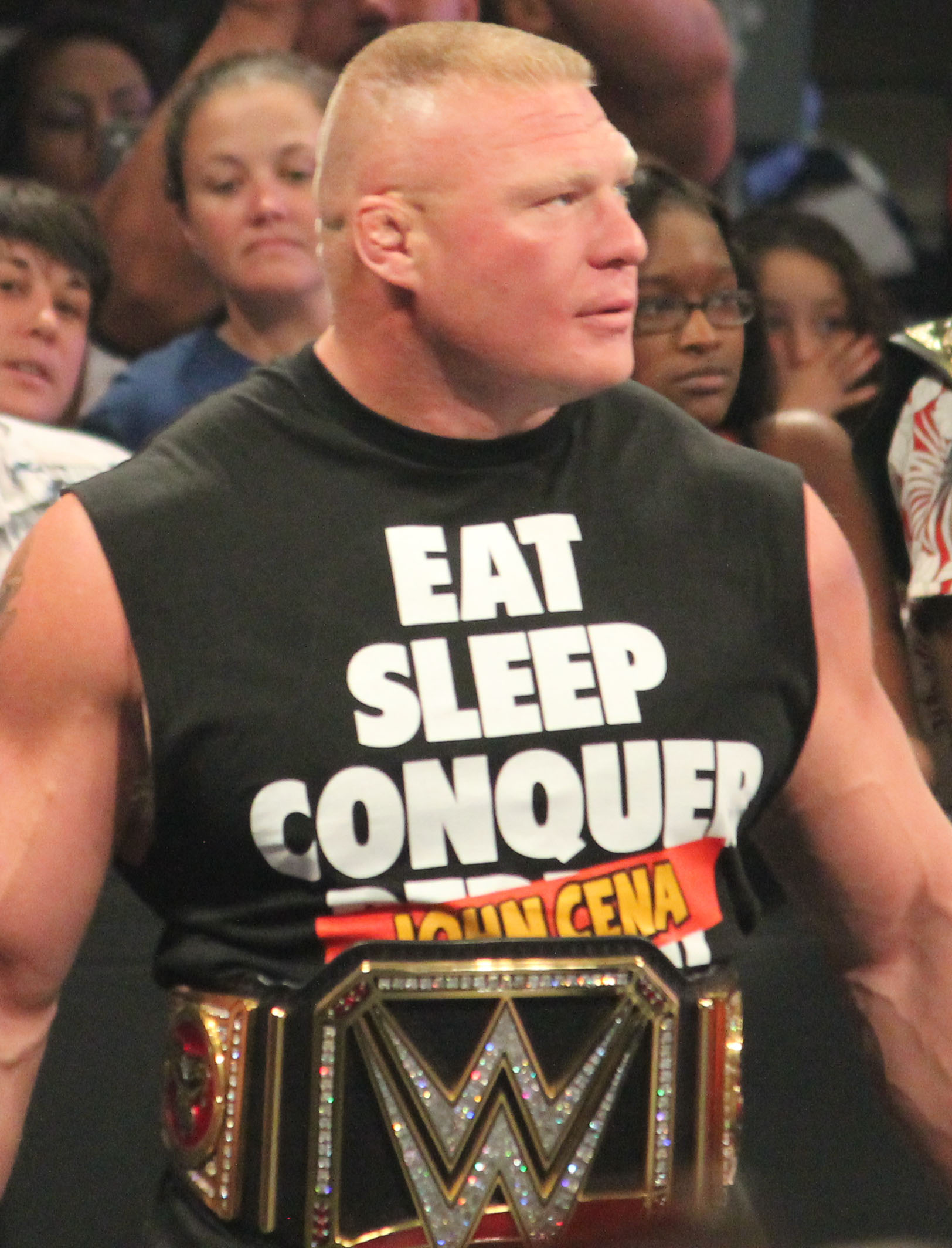
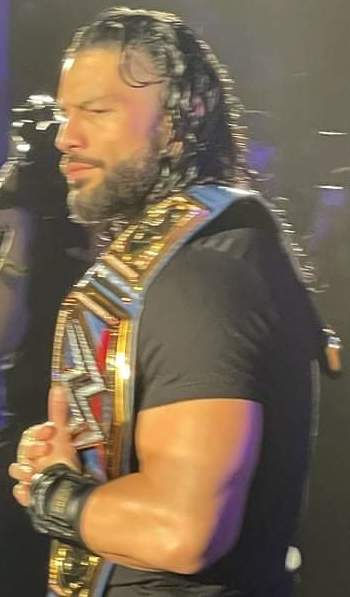
Raw's WWE Champion Brock Lesnar faced SmackDown's Universal Champion Roman Reigns in a Winner Takes All Championship unification match in the main event of Night 2.

In the main event, SmackDown's Universal Champion Roman Reigns (accompanied by Paul Heyman) faced Raw's WWE Champion Brock Lesnar in a Winner Takes All match. Lesnar performed three belly-to-belly suplexes and a clothesline on Reigns. Outside the ring, Heyman distracted Lesnar, allowing Reigns to perform a spear on Lesnar through the timekeeper barricade. Back in the ring, Reigns performed a second spear on Lesnar for a nearfall. As Reigns attempted a superman punch on Lesnar, Lesnar countered by performing five German suplexes on Reigns in quick succession. Reigns performed a third Superman Punch on Lesnar. Lesnar then executed an F-5 on Reigns for a nearfall. As Lesnar attempted a second F-5, Reigns countered by sending Lesnar into the referee, incapacitating him. Reigns took the opportunity to attack Lesnar with a low blow and then strike Lesnar with the title for a nearfall. Reigns performed a Spear on Lesnar and as Reigns attempted another Spear, Lesnar countered and applied the Kimura lock on Reigns. However, Heyman helped Reigns void the submission. In the closing moments, as Lesnar attempted an F-5, Reigns escaped and performed a fourth Spear on Lesnar to win the match and claim both titles to become recognized as the first-ever Undisputed WWE Universal Champion, as well as marking the seventh time a heel won the main event of WrestleMania, including two in a row for Reigns. Although WWE billed the match as a championship unification match, both titles remained independently active, with Reigns recognized as a double champion.

== Reception ==
According to the analytics firm Conviva, WrestleMania accumulated a record 2.2 billion impressions across all social platforms, compared to 1.8 billion for Super Bowl LVI, and up 10% from the previous year. In addition, WWE amassed 1.1 billion video views (up 47% from the previous year) across various social media networks, 13.1 million hours of video watch time (up 29% from the previous year), and 87 million engagements over the weekend of the event. Furthermore, WrestleMania 38 generated $206.5 million for the Dallas/Arlington region, setting a company record and the first time that a WrestleMania generated more than $200 million in economic impact.

WWE reported that Night 1 of WrestleMania had an attendance of 77,899, and that Night 2 had an attendance of 78,453. Bryan Alvarez of the Wrestling Observer Newsletter reported the actual numbers as being 65,719 and 65,653, respectively.

The event received mixed to positive reviews from critics, who praised the Raw Women's Championship, Raw Tag Team Championship match, Johnny Knoxville vs. Sami Zayn, Edge vs. AJ Styles, Pat McAfee's and Logan Paul's performance, Cody Rhodes vs. Seth "Freakin" Rollins, and the in-ring return of "Stone Cold" Steve Austin while criticizing the main event for Night 2, Sheamus and Ridge Holland vs. The New Day, and panning Vince McMahon vs. McAfee, which received a -2 star rating from Dave Meltzer.

The Raw Women's Championship match was praised. Brent Brookhouse of CBS Sports gave the match an A+ grade, the highest grade of the event, stating that the match "stole the show", was "fantastic", and that "the crowd was absolutely mad for the finish". He also mentioned that Belair "is the next wrestler to have an Undertaker-style "streak" at WrestleMania". Chris Mueller of Bleacher Report also gave the match a grade of A+, stating that "a lot of fans were expecting this to be similar to SummerSlam, but with Belair winning this time", but "WWE gave them big entrances and more than enough time to make sure this was a great match". He also said that the match "felt more like a fight with a lot of aggression", and concluded that "this was the first bout that felt truly worthy of being on the WrestleMania card. Everything about it was as close to perfect as you can get". Wade Keller of Pro Wrestling Torch gave the match 4.5 stars, calling the match "excellent", and that Becky Lynch's dominance "felt like it was ultimately giving away a Belair win". He also said that the counters "were really well executed", the "facial expressions and body language in between moves took the match to another level", and that "it felt like real redemption for Belair, even if Becky came across as being a notch better than her throughout most of the match". Dave Meltzer gave the match 4.5 stars.

Cody Rhodes' return was also praised. CBS Sports said that "the match got a bit sloppy, especially down the stretch but as a moment, it served its purpose quite well", and gave the match a grade of B+. Bleacher Report gave the match an A grade, stating that it "was a fantastic display of what you would call "big-match wrestling." They played to the crowd, sold the big spots and made each other look like a million bucks". He also said that "even though this was Rhodes' big return, it was not a one-sided fight. Rollins made him work for the win". Pro Wrestling Torch gave the match 4.25 stars, and called the match "excellent" while also stating that "Cody's got to be mostly happy with that, even if there might have a spot or two where there was a little sign of rust". He also liked Rhodes "channeling his dad for the winning finishing sequence", and concluded that "there might have been some work to do" in giving Rhodes "a mega-star reaction". Dave Meltzer gave the match 4.5 stars.

CBS Sports praised Rey and Dominik Mysterio vs. The Miz and Logan Paul, stating that "a celebrity match at WrestleMania was a fun ride", and that "Paul being a young, athletic performer didn't hurt anything". Bleacher Report stated that Paul "put in the work to make sure he did not embarrass himself here. Not only did he hold his own, but he also had a few impressive moments". He concluded that "Rey and The Miz being the veterans they are meant it had a little shine on it", and that it exceeded expectations. Pro Wrestling Torch said that "Logan showed good athleticism and didn't try to do too much", and that "what he did do looked really good". Dave Metlzer gave the match 3.5 stars.

For the in-ring return of "Stone Cold" Steve Austin, CBS Sports gave it a grade of A, stating that "this wasn't anywhere near the best of either man's career", but "as a purely "special moment" that played to the fans and the "big moments" of WrestleMania, it was fantastic". He concluded that "Given Austin's physical limitations—the impact of a long history of knee injuries was particularly clear throughout—you can't ask for a much better "walk and brawl" style match". Bleacher Report said that the match was not "a classic match that will be studied for years", but it "was fun, entertaining and memorable", and "this is what it takes to make a WrestleMania moment". He concluded that Night 1 of the event "ended up exceeding expectations. A couple of the results were genuinely shocking, we saw a few Match of the Year candidates and Austin worked his first match in nearly two decades. Not too shabby". Pro Wrestling Torch said that "the match wasn't pretty, and Austin didn't look like he was in his physical prime by any means when he was stomping KO in the corner, but he didn't embarrass himself either". Dave Meltzer gave the match 3.5 stars.

CBS Sports stated that the Anything Goes match between Johnny Knoxville and Sami Zayn "was basically a Looney Tunes cartoon in the form of a wrestling match". He said that "some of the gimmicks didn't work", but "as pure entertainment, the match was a complete success". Erik Beaston of Bleacher Report stated that match "was either going to be a cluster of massive proportions that embarrassed everyone involved or a total blast", but it "was the latter and both performers deserve props for crafting a match that kept the fans invested and entertained throughout". He concluded that "this was a great example of garbage wrestling done at an elite level and perhaps Zayn's greatest accomplishment in his WWE run". Pro Wrestling Torch said that the match "was rather excruciating, but that was the point", and that "Knoxville played his part well and Sami was a delightful foil and spot on with his tone and mannerisms throughout". The match was not given a rating by Dave Meltzer.

For the Raw Tag Team Championship match, CBS Sports called it "really fun, all-action match to get the show off on the right foot". Bleacher Report said that the match "was a fantastic way to kick off the show and set the bar for the rest of the broadcast". Pro Wrestling Torch called it "an energetic crowd-pleasing opening tag match", and that the match was "a spotfest, but they managed to give every big spot a chance to breathe". Dave Meltzer gave the match 4.25 stars.

Sheamus and Ridge Holland vs. The New Day was criticized, mainly due to it getting moved from Night 1 to Night 2 and lasting less than two minutes. CBS Sports called it "terribly short and pointless", and "it's not that the outcome was wrong so much as the match just felt smashed in after getting cut from Night 1". Bleacher Report stated that the match "was deemed expendable on Saturday, so it was never expected to be a memorable contest", and that "the same team that has won everything for the last two months scored another win that did nothing to elevate them or make the feud any more meaningful". Pro Wrestling Torch called it "something they could have wedged into last night's show". Dave Meltzer gave the match 0.25 stars.

For Pat McAfee vs. Austin Theory and McAfee vs. Vince McMahon, CBS Sports stated that "the crowd was hot for McAfee and popped big for his win", but gave McAfee vs. McMahon a grade of F, calling it "ridiculous" and it also made McAfee look ridiculous, but gave an A+ for the "Stone Cold" Steve Austin vs. McMahon callback. Bleacher Report said that "McAfee held his own, performed up to the moment and should be allowed back in the ring whenever the opportunity presents itself". However, he also mentioned that "the post-match" "threatened to undo everything accomplished by the first match", stating that "the WWE chairman made the former NFL kicker look like a geek", but called it an "impressive turnaround". Pro Wrestling Torch said that "McAfee did what he could to make that passable action, but nobody was holding McMahon to usual standards, of course. McMahon hammed it up". Dave Meltzer gave McAfee vs. Theory 3.75 stars.

For the WWE Women's Tag Team Championship match, CBS Sports said that the match "was served by pure non-stop action. Well-structured all-around". Bleacher Report said that "the effort was there", but "the match consisted more of spots and flashy sequences than an easily tracked narrative", while also mentioning that "one of the two babyface teams had to win here and, given the fact that Banks had competed at six WrestleManias without a win, this was as good a time as any to right that wrong", and that Banks and Naomi's win "will hopefully inspire the creative team to take the tag titles seriously". Dave Meltzer gave the match 2.5 stars.

For the Winner Takes All Championship Unification match, CBS Sports called the finish "sudden" and that "the match was a bit lacking in the overall drama compared to previous Reigns vs. Lesnar contests", and called it "a bit of a disappointment", but concluded that "there weren't many matches that disappointed across the weekend". Bleacher Report also called the finish "anticlimactic", and that "the feud, the competitors and the audience deserved something a bit more definitive than that", but said that "the right guy went over and Reigns finally has his defining WrestleMania moment, something he and WWE have chased for years". Pro Wrestling Torch gave the match 4 stars, stating that while the finish came out of nowhere, the match was "dramatic" and that it "had an epic feel. It didn't amount to an all-time classic, but the story it told was done really effectively and felt like a really big deal every minute of the way". Keller also stated that "Heyman was tremendous in his role", and concluded that the story was "Lesnar was just too happy-to-lucky and it made him a little soft". Dave Meltzer gave the match 3.25 stars.

For the other rated matches on the card, according to Dave Meltzer, the SmackDown Tag Team Championship match received 1.5 stars, Drew McIntyre vs. Happy Corbin received 2.75 stars, the SmackDown Women's Championship match received 2 stars, Bobby Lashley vs. Omos received 0.5 stars, and Edge vs. AJ Styles received 3.75 stars.

== Aftermath ==
Following his well-received performance at the event, Logan Paul would go on to sign with WWE on June 30 later that year. Seeking revenge, Paul stated on a video that he would be coming for The Miz. He then appeared on the July 18 episode of Raw to confront The Miz, setting up a match between the two at SummerSlam, where Paul won.

Sasha Banks and Naomi successfully retained the WWE Women's Tag Team Championship against their WrestleMania opponents in regular tag team matches over the next few weeks. Their title defense on the May 13 episode of SmackDown would be their final televised WWE appearance, and their match at a WWE Live event on May 15 proved to be their final WWE match, as on the May 16 episode of Raw, Banks and Naomi were scheduled to take part in a six-pack challenge to determine the number one contender for the Raw Women's Championship at Hell in a Cell, but due to legitimate creative frustrations, they walked out of the arena. They were subsequently suspended and stripped of their title. This made WrestleMania 38 the last WWE PLE that Banks took part in. In December 2022, it was reported that contract negotiations with Banks fell through during the summer and she was done with WWE. Banks then debuted for both New Japan Pro-Wrestling (NJPW) and World Wonder Ring Stardom at Wrestle Kingdom 17 on January 4, 2023, changing her ring name to Mercedes Moné. Additionally, on March 23, 2023, Naomi confirmed on her Instagram that she was no longer with WWE. After wrestling in Total Nonstop Action Wrestling in 2023 under her real name Trinity, Naomi returned to WWE at the Royal Rumble event in January 2024, while Moné signed with rival American company All Elite Wrestling, debuting that March.

WrestleMania 38 would be the last WrestleMania to take place under Vince McMahon's creative control. On July 22, Vince announced his retirement from the company. In addition to creating WrestleMania, McMahon had served as chairman and chief executive officer of the company since 1982. Stephanie McMahon and Nick Khan took over as co-CEOs, and the former also took over as Chairwoman of WWE. Vince's son-in-law and Stephanie's husband, Paul "Triple H" Levesque, took over creative control. Stephanie would resign as co-CEO and chairwoman on January 10, 2023, with Khan being named the sole CEO and Vince returning as Executive Chairman. Although Vince returned in an executive role, Triple H maintained complete control of booking WWE's storylines.

=== Raw ===
Cody Rhodes opened the post-WrestleMania episode of Raw, revealing that he returned to WWE to continue the legacy of his late father, Dusty Rhodes, and win the WWE Championship. The following week, he wrestled his first match on Raw since May 2016, where he defeated The Miz. After the match, Seth "Freakin" Rollins confronted Rhodes, setting up a rematch between the two at WrestleMania Backlash, which Rhodes won. On Raw the next night, Rollins cost Rhodes a championship match. This would lead to a third match between the two at Hell in a Cell, this time as a Hell in a Cell match, where Rhodes, despite suffering a legitimate torn pectoral muscle before the event, managed to defeat Rollins again.

The Judgment Day (Edge and Damian Priest) would also continue their rivalry with AJ Styles, leading to a rematch between Styles and Edge at WrestleMania Backlash. At the event, despite Priest being banned from ringside, Edge again defeated Styles after interference from Rhea Ripley, who would join The Judgment Day. At Hell in a Cell, The Judgment Day defeated Styles' team in a six-person mixed tag team match, thus ending their feud with Styles. On Raw the following night, Finn Bálor was added to The Judgment Day. Afterwards, however, Bálor, Priest, and Ripley turned on Edge, kicking him out of the group. At Clash at the Castle in September, The Judgment Day recruited Dominik Mysterio. Edge then continued his feud with The Judgment Day over the next few months and into 2023. The rivalry would go all the way to a Hell in a Cell match between Bálor's "Demon" persona and Edge at Night 2 of WrestleMania 39, which was won by Edge.

On the following Raw, Bobby Lashley's manager, MVP, turned on Lashley, lambasting him and siding with Omos. The following week, MVP stated that he did so because Lashley celebrated his WrestleMania moment without him. This would lead to a rematch between Lashley and Omos at WrestleMania Backlash, with Omos winning. On the May 16 episode of Raw, Lashley defeated Omos again, this time in a Steel Cage match. The following week, a 2-on-1 handicap match pitting Lashley against MVP and Omos was scheduled for Hell in a Cell, which Lashley won, ending the feud.

Following his embarrassment by "Stone Cold" Steve Austin at WrestleMania 38, on the April 11 episode of Raw, Austin Theory was told by Vince McMahon that he would just be known as "Theory", as the name "Austin" did not suit Theory. During Clash at the Castle, Theory would revert to his Austin Theory ring name again.

Also on Raw, Bianca Belair, who sported a black eye from her win over Becky Lynch at WrestleMania 38, stated that she would defend her newly-won Raw Women's Championship against everyone now that she was the champion. Three weeks later, Lynch made her first appearance since WrestleMania 38 and wanted a rematch for the title, but was interrupted by a returning Asuka. At Hell in a Cell, Asuka and Lynch were unsuccessful in defeating Belair in a triple threat match for the title. Lynch then completed her feud with Asuka on the July 4 episode of Raw, defeating her in a No Holds Barred match. Belair soon reignited her feud with Lynch, leading to a title rematch at SummerSlam, where Belair retained. After the match, Lynch embraced Belair, turning face for the first time since May 2020. Belair would continue as champion until Night of Champions on May 27, 2023, where she lost the title to Asuka, ending her reign at 420 days, the longest in the title's history, as well as the longest WWE women's championship reign of the modern era.

=== SmackDown ===
On the following SmackDown, Undisputed WWE Universal Champion Roman Reigns claimed he had nothing left to prove, but said that SmackDown Tag Team Champions The Usos (Jey Uso and Jimmy Uso) needed to go to Raw and unify the Raw Tag Team Championship with their tag team titles so that The Bloodline would have all the gold. The following week, Raw Tag Team Champions RK-Bro (Randy Orton and Riddle) accepted the challenge and the match was scheduled for WrestleMania Backlash. However, on the April 29 episode, the match was changed to a six-man tag team match pitting The Bloodline against RK-Bro and Drew McIntyre, which was won by The Bloodline. The tag team championship unification match was rescheduled to the May 20 episode, where The Usos won to become the Undisputed WWE Tag Team Champions.

After WrestleMania 38, the trio of Sheamus, Ridge Holland, and Butch would dub themselves as The Brawling Brutes and continued their feud with The New Day (Kofi Kingston and Xavier Woods), with one member of each team scoring a win over the other in singles matches. This eventually led to a tables match pitting Sheamus and Holland against Woods and Kingston on the May 6 episode of SmackDown, where Sheamus and Holland won after interference from Butch. After two more weeks of the teams trading wins in singles matches, on the May 27 episode, Drew McIntyre joined The New Day in defeating The Brawling Brutes in a six-man tag team match. The following week, The Brawling Brutes defeated The New Day and McIntyre in a rematch to end the feud.

After Madcap Moss cost Happy Corbin his match at WrestleMania 38, dissension arose between the two, with Corbin blaming Moss for his loss. Over the coming weeks, the two continued to taunt each other, leading to a match at WrestleMania Backlash, where Moss won. On the following SmackDown, Corbin attacked Moss, slamming his André the Giant Memorial Trophy on the chair wrapped around his neck, leading to Moss suffering a (kayfabe) cervical contusion. Moss returned on the June 3 episode, where he lost to Corbin via disqualification after using a steel chair, setting up a No Holds Barred match between the two at Hell in a Cell, where Moss won. The two had one further match on the June 17 episode as a "Last Laugh" match, which was won by Moss, thus ending their feud.

After failing to defeat SmackDown Women's Champion Charlotte Flair, Ronda Rousey appeared on the following SmackDown to challenge Flair to an "I Quit" match for the title. Flair declined, ordering Rousey to go back to the locker room. During Talking Smack the next day, however, the championship rematch was scheduled for WrestleMania Backlash. At the event, Rousey defeated Flair to win the title for the first time. Afterwards, it was announced that Flair had (kayfabe) broken her radial bone in her forearm, putting her out of action for several months. Flair returned on the December 30 episode of SmackDown, where she challenged and defeated Rousey in an impromptu match to reclaim the title for a record seventh time.

On the June 17 episode of SmackDown, after Roman Reigns retained the Undisputed WWE Universal Championship, he claimed that there was no one left to face him. Afterwards, Brock Lesnar made his first appearance since WrestleMania 38, and offered Reigns a handshake. As Reigns went to shake his hand, Lesnar attacked Reigns and then attacked The Usos (Jey Uso and Jimmy Uso), who had come to Reigns' aid. It was subsequently announced that Reigns would defend the Undisputed WWE Universal Championship against Lesnar in a Last Man Standing match at SummerSlam, which WWE billed as their last match against each other. At the event, Reigns, with interference from The Usos, Paul Heyman, and Theory, defeated Lesnar to retain the titles and end their rivalry. Reigns would eventually feud with Cody Rhodes, winning their first encounter at Night 2 of WrestleMania 39, but in the main event of Night 2 of WrestleMania XL, Rhodes defeated Reigns in a Bloodline Rules match to end Reigns' 1,316 day reign as Universal Champion.

== Results ==
Night 1
No.	Results	Stipulations	Times
1	The Usos (Jey Uso and Jimmy Uso) (c) defeated Shinsuke Nakamura and Rick Boogs by pinfall	Tag team match for the WWE SmackDown Tag Team Championship	6:55
2	Drew McIntyre defeated Happy Corbin (with Madcap Moss) by pinfall	Singles match	8:35
3	The Miz and Logan Paul defeated Rey Mysterio and Dominik Mysterio by pinfall	Tag team match	11:15
4	Bianca Belair defeated Becky Lynch (c) by pinfall	Singles match for the WWE Raw Women's Championship	19:10
5	Cody Rhodes defeated Seth "Freakin" Rollins by pinfall	Singles match	21:40
6	Charlotte Flair (c) defeated Ronda Rousey by pinfall	Singles match for the WWE SmackDown Women's Championship	18:30
7	"Stone Cold" Steve Austin defeated Kevin Owens by pinfall	No Holds Barred match	13:55
(c) / – the champion(s) heading into the match

Night 2
No.	Results	Stipulations	Times
1	RK-Bro (Randy Orton and Riddle) (c) defeated The Street Profits (Angelo Dawkins and Montez Ford) and Alpha Academy (Chad Gable and Otis) by pinfall	Triple threat tag team match for the WWE Raw Tag Team Championship	11:30
2	Bobby Lashley defeated Omos by pinfall	Singles match	6:35
3	Johnny Knoxville defeated Sami Zayn by pinfall	Anything Goes match	14:25
4	Sasha Banks and Naomi defeated Carmella and Queen Zelina (c), Liv Morgan and Rhea Ripley, and Natalya and Shayna Baszler by pinfall	Fatal four-way tag team match for the WWE Women's Tag Team Championship	10:50
5	Edge defeated AJ Styles by pinfall	Singles match	24:05
6	Sheamus and Ridge Holland (with Butch) defeated The New Day (Kofi Kingston and Xavier Woods) by pinfall	Tag team match	1:40
7	Pat McAfee defeated Austin Theory (with Mr. McMahon) by pinfall	Singles match	9:40
8	Mr. McMahon (with Austin Theory) defeated Pat McAfee by pinfall	Singles match	3:45
9	Roman Reigns (Universal) (with Paul Heyman) defeated Brock Lesnar (WWE) by pinfall	Winner Takes All match for the WWE Championship and WWE Universal Championship	12:15
(c) / – the champion(s) heading into the match
