= Elimination Chamber (2022) =

WWE premium live event

Elimination Chamber ليمنيشن تشامبر (Arabic)
- Promotional poster featuring Brock Lesnar and the Elimination Chamber structure over the city of Jeddah.
- Promotion: WWE
- Brand(s): Raw; SmackDown
- Date: February 19, 2022
- City: Jeddah, Saudi Arabia
- Venue: Jeddah Super Dome
- Attendance: 33,328

WWE event chronology
| ← Previous; Royal Rumble | Next → NXT Stand & Deliver |

Elimination Chamber chronology
| ← Previous; 2021 | Next → 2023 |

WWE in Saudi Arabia chronology
| ← Previous; Crown Jewel (2021) | Next → Crown Jewel (2022) |

The 2022 Elimination Chamber (Arabic: إليمنيشن تشامبر; known as No Escape in Germany) was a professional wrestling premium live event (PLE) produced by the American company WWE, held for wrestlers from the promotion's main roster brands, Raw and SmackDown. It was the 12th Elimination Chamber event and took place on Saturday, February 19, 2022, at the Jeddah Super Dome in Jeddah, Saudi Arabia and aired live at 8:00 p.m. Arabia Standard Time (12:00 p.m. Eastern Time). The event centered on the Elimination Chamber match, a type of roofed steel cage that surrounds the ring and ringside area with no disqualifications; the objective is to eliminate all other opponents either by pinfall or submission with championship implications at stake.

This was the seventh event that WWE held in Saudi Arabia under a 10-year partnership in support of Saudi Vision 2030, which subsequently made it WWE's first previously-established event to take place in the country as well as WWE's first Saudi Arabian event held on a Saturday, as they were previously held on Thursdays or Fridays. It would also be the first Elimination Chamber event to take place outside of the United States, the first held on a Saturday, and the first to livestream on Peacock in the United States and Disney+ Hotstar in Indonesia, following the shutdown of the WWE Network in those respective markets in April 2021 and January 2022. This was also the first Elimination Chamber event to be branded as a "premium live event", a term the company introduced at the start of the year to refer to its events airing on traditional pay-per-view and via WWE's livestreaming platforms.

Seven matches were contested at the event, including one on the Kickoff pre-show. The event featured two Elimination Chamber matches, one each for the men and women, but with both held for Raw. In the main event, Brock Lesnar won the men's eponymous match to win the WWE Championship by last eliminating Austin Theory; during the match, defending champion Bobby Lashley was removed due to a "concussion protocol". This made Lesnar the first and only wrestler to win both the Royal Rumble and Elimination Chamber matches within the same year. The women's match was won by Bianca Belair, earning a Raw Women's Championship match at WrestleMania 38. In other prominent matches, Becky Lynch defeated Lita to retain the Raw Women's Championship, and in the opening bout, Roman Reigns defeated Goldberg to retain SmackDown's Universal Championship, a matchup that was originally supposed to have taken place at WrestleMania 36 in April 2020 but with Goldberg defending the title before the COVID-19 pandemic changed those plans.

== Production ==
The 12th Elimination Chamber event was held at the Jeddah Superdome in Jeddah, Saudi Arabia (pictured).

=== Background ===
Elimination Chamber is a professional wrestling premium live event (PLE) first produced by the American promotion WWE in 2010. It was originally broadcast exclusively via pay-per-view (PPV) before it began simultaneously livestreaming on the WWE Network in 2015. It has been held every year since, except in 2016, generally in February. The concept of the event is that one or two main event matches are contested inside the Elimination Chamber, either with championships or future opportunities at championships at stake.

In early 2018, WWE began a 10-year strategic multiplatform partnership with the Ministry of Sport (formerly General Sports Authority) in support of Saudi Vision 2030, Saudi Arabia's social and economic reform program. On January 17, 2022, the seventh event under this partnership was announced as the 12th Elimination Chamber event, scheduled for Saturday, February 19, 2022, at the Jeddah Super Dome in Jeddah, featuring wrestlers from the Raw and SmackDown brand divisions. It was in turn the first Elimination Chamber event to take place in Saudi Arabia, the first to take place outside of the United States, and it was both the first Elimination Chamber event and WWE's first Saudi Arabian event to be held on a Saturday, as the Saudi events were previously held on Thursdays or Fridays while Elimination Chamber was previously held on Sundays. It was also WWE's first previously-established event to take place in the country. This was also the first Elimination Chamber to be branded as a "premium live event", a term the company introduced on January 1 to refer to its events that are available on PPV and via livestreaming.

The Elimination Chamber match is an elimination-based match contested in a type of large roofed steel cage that surrounds the wrestling ring with an elevated platform around the ring. Within the Chamber are four inner pods, one behind each ring post. The match is contested by six participants. Two wrestlers start the match, while the other four are held within each inner pod with one selected randomly to enter the match at regular intervals, which continues until all four have been released. The objective is to eliminate all other opponents by pinfall or submission, and there are no disqualifications or count-outs.

In 2011 and since 2013, the show has been promoted as "No Escape" in Germany as it was feared that the name "Elimination Chamber" may remind people of the gas chambers used during the Holocaust; it was promoted as "No Way Out" in 2010 and 2012.

=== Broadcast outlets ===
The PLE was broadcast on traditional PPV outlets worldwide. It was also available to livestream on Peacock in the United States, SonyLIV in India, Disney+ Hotstar in Indonesia, and the WWE Network everywhere else. This was the first Elimination Chamber to livestream on Peacock in the United States, following the shutdown of the American version of the WWE Network in April 2021. This was also the first Elimination Chamber to livestream on Disney+ Hotstar in Indonesia, following the shutdown of its version of the WWE Network in late January. With the event being held in Saudi Arabia, it aired live at 8:00 p.m. Arabia Standard Time (12:00 p.m. Eastern Time).

=== Storylines ===
The event comprised seven matches, including one on the Kickoff pre-show, that resulted from scripted storylines. Results were predetermined by WWE's writers on the Raw and SmackDown brands, while storylines were produced on WWE's weekly television shows, Monday Night Raw and Friday Night SmackDown.

At the Royal Rumble, Bobby Lashley defeated Brock Lesnar to win Raw's WWE Championship due to Paul Heyman betraying Lesnar, who later entered the Royal Rumble match and won to earn a world championship match of his choice at WrestleMania 38. On January 31, it was announced that Lashley would defend the WWE Championship in an Elimination Chamber match at the eponymous event. On that night's Raw, after Lesnar confirmed his decision to challenge for SmackDown's world championship at WrestleMania, he also demanded a rematch against Lashley that night as Lashley did not fairly win the WWE Championship; however, on MVP's advice, Lashley declined. WWE official Adam Pearce then announced that Lesnar would be competing in the Elimination Chamber match. Later, Seth "Freakin" Rollins also announced that he would be one of the participants due to technically winning his match at the Royal Rumble. The final three spots were determined in qualification matches that night: Austin Theory, Riddle, and AJ Styles qualified by defeating Kevin Owens, Otis, and Rey Mysterio, respectively.

Roman Reigns was originally scheduled to face Goldberg for the Universal Championship at WrestleMania 36 in April 2020; however, due to the onset of the COVID-19 pandemic shortly before the event, Reigns pulled out of the match due to his immunocompromised state from past battles with leukemia. Goldberg faced another challenger at that event who defeated him for the title, with Reigns returning later that year and winning the title at Payback in August. Nearly two years later since their canceled match at WrestleMania 36, Goldberg appeared on the February 4, 2022, episode of SmackDown and challenged Reigns for the Universal Championship at Elimination Chamber, which was made official.

At Day 1, Drew McIntyre defeated Madcap Moss, who was accompanied by Happy Corbin. Later that night while McIntyre was interviewed backstage, Corbin and Moss attacked McIntyre, injuring his neck, which was reported to require surgery. At the Royal Rumble, McIntyre made a surprise return from his injury during the Royal Rumble match and eliminated Corbin and Moss, after which, McIntyre attacked Corbin and Moss further with the steel steps following their eliminations. On the following SmackDown, McIntyre stated he would continue to target the two due to them almost ending his career. A rematch between McIntyre and Moss was scheduled for Elimination Chamber. The rematch was then stipulated as a Falls Count Anywhere match.

On the February 11 episode of SmackDown, after Charlotte Flair retained the SmackDown Women's Championship against Naomi, Flair and Sonya Deville, who had a long history with Naomi which dated back to September 2021, attacked Naomi until women's Royal Rumble winner Ronda Rousey, who chose to face Flair for the SmackDown Women's Championship at WrestleMania 38 the previous week, made the save. It was subsequently confirmed that Rousey would team with Naomi to take on Deville and Flair at Elimination Chamber. On the February 18 episode, during the contract signing for the match, it was revealed that Rousey would have to wrestle with one arm tied behind her back.

On February 7, a women's Elimination Chamber match was scheduled for Elimination Chamber with the winner earning a Raw Women's Championship match at WrestleMania 38. Bianca Belair, Liv Morgan, Rhea Ripley, Doudrop, and Nikki A.S.H. were announced for the match with one spot to be filled. The following week on Raw, Belair defeated all the other women in a gauntlet match to earn the right to enter the match last. Also on that episode, after weeks of therapy sessions after her doll Lily had been destroyed at Extreme Rules in September 2021, Alexa Bliss completed her final session and named herself as the sixth competitor for the match.

On the January 14 episode of SmackDown, The Viking Raiders (Erik and Ivar) won a fatal four-way tag team match to become the number one contenders for The Usos's (Jey Uso and Jimmy Uso) SmackDown Tag Team Championship. On February 3, the match was scheduled for Elimination Chamber.

On the January 31 episode of Raw, The Miz defeated Dominik Mysterio. The following week, Dominik and his father Rey Mysterio were guests on "Miz TV". Rey claimed that Miz cheated to defeat Dominik while Miz took issue that Rey had an opportunity to qualify for the WWE Championship Elimination Chamber match while he did not and also that Rey was the cover star of the WWE 2K22 video game. Miz also questioned if Rey was truly Dominik's dad, referencing the child custody battle that Rey had with Eddie Guerrero back at SummerSlam in 2005. Dominik then defeated Miz in a rematch. On the February 14 episode, during The Mysterios's (Rey and Dominik) match, The Miz provided a distraction, causing them to lose. Afterwards, The Miz and Maryse tossed Dominik out of the ring, and The Miz performed a Skull-Crushing Finale on Rey. Later that night, a match between The Miz and Rey was scheduled for Elimination Chamber. On the day of the event, the match was booked for the Kickoff pre-show.

On the January 31 episode of Raw, Raw Women's Champion Becky Lynch was confronted by Lita, who challenged the champion for the title at Elimination Chamber, which was made official.

== Event ==
Other on-screen personnel
| Role: | Name: |
|---|---|
| English commentators | Michael Cole |
| English commentators | Corey Graves |
| English commentators | Byron Saxton |
| Spanish commentators | Marcelo Rodriguez |
| Spanish commentators | Jerry Soto |
| Arabic commentators | Faisal Al-Mughaisib |
| Arabic commentators | Jude Aldajani |
| Ring announcer | Mike Rome |
| Referees | Danilo Anfibio |
| Referees | Jessika Carr |
| Referees | Dan Engler |
| Referees | Eddie Orengo |
| Referees | Chad Patton |
| Referees | Darryl Sharma |
| Interviewer | Kevin Patrick |
| Pre-show panel | Jackie Redmond |
| Pre-show panel | Matt Camp |
| Pre-show panel | Peter Rosenberg |

=== Pre-show ===
During the Elimination Chamber Kickoff pre-show, Rey Mysterio (accompanied by Dominik Mysterio) faced The Miz. During the match, Miz retrieved a chair, however, Rey performed a Crossbody on Miz. As Miz tried to use the chair again, Dominik thwarted Miz, however, Miz feigned getting attacked by Dominik. This resulted in the referee ejecting Dominik from ringside. In the end, Rey rolled up Miz to win the match. Following the match, Rey and Dominik performed double 619s on Miz.

=== Preliminary matches ===
The actual PLE opened with Roman Reigns (accompanied by Paul Heyman) defending the WWE Universal Championship against Goldberg in their long-awaited match that was originally planned for WrestleMania 36 in April 2020. Reigns cut a quick promo, stating that the Kingdom of Saudi Arabia must acknowledge him before Goldberg made his entrance. At the start of the match, Goldberg pushed back Reigns during a force grapple duel, but Reigns countered with a knee strike on the stomach and punches on the head, taking Goldberg out of the ring. The two fought at ringside where Goldberg, after some crashes of his head on an announce table by Reigns, gave him the knee strike on the stomach back, a throw into the barricade, and elbow strikes on the head. Back to the ring, Goldberg performed a Spear on Reigns. As Goldberg attempted a Jackhammer, Reigns reversed it into an Uranage for a nearfall. Then, Reigns performed a Superman Punch on Goldberg. As Reigns attempted a Spear, Goldberg reversed it into a second Spear in the middle of the air. As Goldberg attempted a Jackhammer again, Reigns reversed it again into a Guillotine Submission Hold. After some crashes of Reigns' body into a corner, Goldberg finally passed out and Reigns retained the WWE Universal Championship.

Next, the women's Elimination Chamber match was contested where the winner would earn a Raw Women's Championship match at WrestleMania 38. Liv Morgan and Nikki A.S.H. started the match. The third entrant was Doudrop followed by Rhea Ripley. Ripley went after Nikki where both climbed the Chamber wall and fell onto Morgan. Ripley performed a Riptide on Nikki to eliminate her. The fifth entrant was Alexa Bliss. Morgan performed a Sitout Powerbomb on Doudrop to eliminate her. The last entrant was Bianca Belair, who earned the opportunity to enter last by winning a gauntlet match on the preceding episode of Raw. Belair and Ripley performed double vertical Suplexes on Morgan and Bliss, respectively. Bliss performed Twisted Bliss on Morgan to eliminate her. Belair performed a Kiss Of Death on Ripley to eliminate her. In the end, Belair performed a Kiss of Death on Bliss to win the match and earn a Raw Women's Championship match at WrestleMania 38.

After that, Ronda Rousey and Naomi faced SmackDown Women's Champion Charlotte Flair and WWE official Sonya Deville where Rousey had to wrestle with one arm tied behind her back. In the end, Rousey forced Deville to submit to the armbar to win the match.

In the fourth match, Drew McIntyre faced Madcap Moss (accompanied by Happy Corbin) in a Falls Count Anywhere match. Throughout the match, Corbin and Moss double-teamed McIntyre, but could not get the win. At one point, McIntyre performed an inverted Alabama Slam on Moss, who landed on his head. Later, McIntyre performed a Superplex on Moss for a nearfall. In the end, McIntyre swung his sword, but Corbin ducked it and retreated. McIntyre then performed a Claymore Kick on Moss and pinned him with one foot while glaring at Corbin to win the match.

Backstage, The Miz was interviewed about his loss during the pre-show where he accused Rey Mysterio of cheating due to help from his son Dominik. Miz said he would find a tag team partner and that it would be a "global superstar".

In the penultimate match, Becky Lynch defended the Raw Women's Championship against Lita. During the match, Lita countered a Dis-arm-her attempt into a roll-up, but Lynch countered into her own roll-up attempt for a nearfall. Later, Lita performed a headscissors takedown and a Twist of Fate on Lynch for a nearfall. Lynch applied the Dis-arm-her, but released the hold and performed a Manhandle Slam on Lita, who placed her foot on the rope to void the pin. In the climax, Lynch attempted a Moonsault, but Lita moved out of the way and performed a Twist of Fate and a Moonsault on Lynch for a nearfall. Moments later, Lynch performed a second Manhandle Slam on Lita to retain the title.

Before the main event, The Usos (Jey Uso and Jimmy Uso) were scheduled to defend the SmackDown Tag Team Championship against The Viking Raiders (Erik and Ivar), but The Usos attacked The Viking Raiders before the match could begin, thus the match was called off.

=== Main event ===
In the main event, Bobby Lashley defended the WWE Championship against AJ Styles, Brock Lesnar, Riddle, Austin Theory, and Seth "Freakin" Rollins in an Elimination Chamber match. Theory and Rollins started the match. Rollins performed a powerbomb on Theory into Lashley's pod, resulting in the impact to have incapacitated Lashley just before Riddle was the third entrant to enter the match. Styles entered fourth as medical personnel and referees were removing Lashley from the chamber. The fifth entrant was supposed to be Lashley, but since Lashley was gone, Lesnar broke through his pod and entered the match, thus Lesnar stole Lashley's number in the Elimination Chamber entry order. Lesnar performed an F-5 on Rollins to eliminate him. While Lesnar eliminated Riddle with that same move, commentator Michael Cole stated that Lashley was in concussion protocol, meaning that he would not be back in the match (in reality, Lashley had legitimately injured his shoulder prior to the event and the "concussion protocol" was used to write him out of the match), and a new WWE champion was guaranteed. Lesnar performed an F-5 on Styles to eliminate him. After Lesnar dominated Theory, Theory performed a low blow, a rolling dropkick, and a DDT on Lesnar for a nearfall. Theory climbed to the top of a pod, where Lesnar caught up to him. Lesnar slammed Theory into the plexiglass multiple times before performing an F-5 on Theory from the top of the pod. Lesnar then pinned Theory to win the WWE Championship for a seventh time, becoming the first Royal Rumble winner to win a world title before WrestleMania. WWE then confirmed that his WrestleMania match against Universal Champion Roman Reigns would be a Winner Takes All match to "unify" both the WWE and Universal Championships.

== Reception ==
The men's Elimination Chamber match was the highest rated match of the night, according to Dave Meltzer, which received 3.5 stars. Meanwhile, Roman Reigns vs. Goldberg and Charlotte and Sonya vs. Ronda and Naomi were the lowest rated matches of the night, both receiving 2 stars. Lita vs. Becky Lynch and Drew McIntyre vs. Madcap Moss received 3.25 stars, Rey Mysterio vs. The Miz received 2.75 stars, and the women's Elimination Chamber match received 3 stars.

== Aftermath ==
=== Raw ===
On the following episode of Raw, new WWE Champion Brock Lesnar set his sights on facing Universal Champion Roman Reigns at WrestleMania 38. Paul Heyman then interrupted, stating that Lesnar would not make it to WrestleMania as the WWE Champion as he had a scheduled rematch against former champion Bobby Lashley on March 5 at the WWE Live show in Madison Square Garden in New York City, although if Lashley was not cleared from his concussion protocol, Heyman would find another worthy challenger. Lashley was not cleared and was replaced by Austin Theory, who Lesnar defeated to retain the title.

Also on the following Raw, The Miz stated that he had found a tag team partner to face Rey and Dominik Mysterio at WrestleMania 38. After Miz teased the identity of his partner, The Mysterios interrupted, stating it did not matter who Miz had chosen. The Miz then revealed it was social media personality Logan Paul, after which, both Miz and Paul attacked The Mysterios.

=== SmackDown ===
On the following episode of SmackDown, Universal Champion Roman Reigns and WWE Champion Brock Lesnar had a contract signing for their Winner Takes All match at WrestleMania 38. During the segment, it was announced that the match would also be a championship unification match, which WWE began billing as "The Biggest WrestleMania Match of All-Time".

Also on SmackDown, The Viking Raiders (Erik and Ivar) attacked SmackDown Tag Team Champions The Usos (Jey Uso and Jimmy Uso) backstage, stating they wanted their title match since they did not actually get to have their match at Elimination Chamber. They received their championship match the following week where The Usos retained.

A rematch between Drew McIntyre and Madcap Moss was scheduled for the following SmackDown, but it was changed to McIntyre vs. Happy Corbin. This was a trick as Corbin and Moss attacked McIntyre before the match, leading to McIntyre facing Moss, which McIntyre won. On March 3, a match between McIntyre and Corbin was scheduled for WrestleMania 38.

While Naomi joined forces with Sasha Banks in setting their sights on the WWE Women's Tag Team Championship, Ronda Rousey continued her rivalry with Sonya Deville and SmackDown Women's Champion Charlotte Flair. Rousey expressed her intentions to be a role model for her daughter, but was interrupted by Flair. Deville attacked Rousey from behind and Flair joined the beatdown, only for Rousey to gain the upper hand. A match between Rousey and Deville was scheduled for the following week, which Rousey won. After the match, Flair, who was on guest commentary during the match, called Rousey a "one-trick pony". Rousey responded by applying the Ankle lock on Flair to force a submission and send Flair retreating.

== Results ==
| No. | Results | Stipulations | Times |
|---|---|---|---|
| 1^{P} | Rey Mysterio (with Dominik Mysterio) defeated The Miz by pinfall | Singles match | 9:15 |
| 2 | Roman Reigns (c) (with Paul Heyman) defeated Goldberg by technical submission | Singles match for the WWE Universal Championship | 6:00 |
| 3 | Bianca Belair defeated Alexa Bliss, Doudrop, Liv Morgan, Nikki A.S.H., and Rhea Ripley | Elimination Chamber match for a WWE Raw Women's Championship match at WrestleMania 38 | 15:45 |
| 4 | Naomi and Ronda Rousey defeated Charlotte Flair and Sonya Deville by submission | Tag team match Ronda Rousey had to wrestle with one arm tied behind her back. | 9:14 |
| 5 | Drew McIntyre defeated Madcap Moss (with Happy Corbin) by pinfall | Falls Count Anywhere match | 9:00 |
| 6 | Becky Lynch (c) defeated Lita by pinfall | Singles match for the WWE Raw Women's Championship | 12:10 |
| 7 | Brock Lesnar defeated Bobby Lashley (c), AJ Styles, Austin Theory, Riddle, and Seth "Freakin" Rollins | Elimination Chamber match for the WWE Championship | 14:55 |
(c) / – the champion(s) heading into the match; P / – the match was broadcast on the pre-show

=== Women's Elimination Chamber match ===
| Eliminated | Wrestler | Entered | Eliminated by | Method | Times |
|---|---|---|---|---|---|
| 1 | Nikki A.S.H. | 1 | Rhea Ripley | Pinfall | 6:20 |
| 2 | Doudrop | 3 | Liv Morgan | Pinfall | 8:50 |
| 3 | Liv Morgan | 2 | Alexa Bliss | Pinfall | 12:10 |
| 4 | Rhea Ripley | 4 | Bianca Belair | Pinfall | 12:45 |
| 5 | Alexa Bliss | 5 | Bianca Belair | Pinfall | 15:45 |
| Winner | Bianca Belair | 6 | | | 15:45 |

=== WWE Championship Elimination Chamber match ===
| Eliminated | Wrestler | Entered | Eliminated by | Method | Times |
|---|---|---|---|---|---|
| N/A | Bobby Lashley (c) | N/A | Unable to compete | | |
| 1 | Seth "Freakin" Rollins | 2 | Brock Lesnar | F-5 | 9:50 |
| 2 | Riddle | 3 | Brock Lesnar | F-5 | 10:05 |
| 3 | AJ Styles | 4 | Brock Lesnar | F-5 | 11:00 |
| 4 | Austin Theory | 1 | Brock Lesnar | F-5 | 14:55 |
| Winner | Brock Lesnar | 5 | | | |
