= Australian Idol season 11 =

Season of television series

Australian Idol
- Season 11
- Hosted by: Ricki-Lee Coulter; Scott Tweedie
- Judges: Kyle Sandilands; Amy Shark; Marcia Hines; Jessica Mauboy (Guest); Anastacia (Guest)
- Winner: Kesha Oayda
- Runner-up: Harlan Goode
- Finals venue: Sydney Coliseum Theatre

Release
- Original network: Seven Network
- Original release: 2 February – 14 April 2026

Season chronology
- ← Previous; Season 10

- Australian Idol (Season 11)
- Finalists (with dates of elimination)
Kesha Oayda	Winner
Harlan Goode	Runner-up
Kalani Artis	14 April
Tre Samuels	7 April
Jacinta Guirguis	7 April
John Standley	7 April
Charlie Moon	30 March
Simela Petridis	30 March
Wanwue Tarpeh	24 March
Harry Lamb	24 March
Sophie Poidevin	17 March
Lily-Grace Grant	17 March

The eleventh season of Australian Idol premiered on 2 February 2026. This is the fourth season airing on Seven Network, after they bought the rights to the series from Network 10. The grand final was won by Kesha Oayda on 14 April 2026.

== Production ==
In April 2025, it was officially revealed that the show had been renewed by Seven Network for an eleventh season, set to premiere in 2026. It was revealed that Ricki-Lee and Scott Tweedie would both return as hosts, and Kyle Sandilands, Marcia Hines and Amy Shark would all be returning as judges. Seven later confirmed the 2026 cast at their upfronts on 22 October 2025.

== Auditions ==
Auditions were held in various cities around Australia. In a few cases, a single judge visited a remote location to audition contestants by themselves. Like last season, contestants were not guaranteed a "golden ticket" if they got two or three "yes" votes from the judges. Instead, they were sent to a holding area until the end of the day, when the judges would further narrow down the contestants they saw, potentially have some contestants sing again, and decide who made the Top 30.

=== Auditions 1 (2 February) ===
Singers that received a golden ticket
Singer	Age	Hometown	Song
Kalani Artis	23	Central Coast, New South Wales	"Torn" by Natalie Imbruglia
Lily-Grace Grant	17	Northern Rivers, New South Wales	"What You Get Is What You See" by Tina Turner
John Standley	16	Bunbury, Western Australia	"Shout " by The Isley Brothers
Eva Ilov	20	Brisbane, Queensland	"Saving All My Love for You" by Whitney Houston/ "Tennessee Whiskey" by Chris Stapleton/ "Down Under" by Men at Work
Mat Rigby	17	Melbourne, Victoria	"Viva la Vida" by Coldplay

=== Auditions 2 (3 February) ===
Singers that received a golden ticket
Singer	Age	Hometown	Song
Charlie Moon	31	Perth, Western Australia	"Birds of a Feather" by Billie Eilish
Harriet Kenworthy	19	Perth, Western Australia	"Scar" by Missy Higgins
Achille Fong	20	Sydney, New South Wales	"All The Small Things" by Blink 182
Jacinta Guirguis	25	Bacchus Marsh, Victoria	"Somebody That I Used To Know" by Gotye & Kimbra

=== Auditions 3 (8 February) ===
Singers that received a golden ticket
Singer	Age	Hometown	Song
Simela Petridis	31	Adelaide, South Australia	"I Don't Want to Wait" by Paula Cole
Taiyo Marchand	15	Sydney, New South Wales	"Treasure" by Bruno Mars
Vince Phillips	25	Hawkesbury, New South Wales	"Achy Breaky Heart" by Billy Ray Cyrus

- Jessica Mauboy filled in for Kyle while he was in Canberra.

=== Auditions 4 (9 February) ===
Singers that received a golden ticket
Singer	Age	Hometown	Song
Cody James	20	Karratha, Western Australia	"Fire and the Flood" by Vance Joy
Wanwue Tarpeh	21	Melbourne, Victoria	"Man! I Feel Like a Woman!" by Shania Twain
Olivia Giaourtas	21	Camden, New South Wales	"Hold On" by Wilson Phillips
Nicholas Storm	19	Gawler South, South Australia	"Treat You Better " by Shawn Mendes
Riley Ziskey	23	Gympie,Queensland	"Take It Easy" by Eagles

=== Auditions 5 (15 February) ===
Singers that received a golden ticket
Singer	Age	Hometown	Song
Sophie Poidevin	19	Melbourne, Victoria	"Make You Feel My Love" by Adele / "Tainted Love by Gloria Jones
Tre Samuels	26	Melbourne, Victoria	"Back at One" by Brian McKnight
Kesha Oayda	21	Jindabyne, New South Wales	"Die with a Smile" by Lady Gaga and Bruno Mars
Harry Lamb	26	Ballarat, Victoria	"Eye of the Tiger" by Survivor

=== Auditions 6 (16 February) ===
Singers that received a golden ticket
Singer	Age	Hometown	Song
Lydia Virgo	24	Northern Beaches, New South Wales	"Born This Way" by Lady Gaga
Harlan Goode	18	Brisbane, Queensland	"The Winner Takes It All" by ABBA
Rochelle Ballard	23	Longreach, Queensland	"Over the Rainbow" by Judy Garland
Alita Santhosh	22	Adelaide, South Australia	"Shackles (Praise You)" by Mary Mary
Asher Iyer	16	Brisbane, Queensland	"Hip Hop Hooray" by Naughty by Nature

=== Auditions 7 (22 February) ===
Singers that received a golden ticket
Singer	Age	Hometown	Song
Jamie Lamont	20	Gold Coast, Queensland	"I Feel the Earth Move" by Carole King
Natalie Lockhart	25	Gold Coast, Queensland	"I Wanna Dance with Somebody (Who Loves Me)" by Whitney Houston
Kahlia Henao	27	Western Sydney, New South Wales	"Valerie" by Amy Winehouse
Lachie Clue	20	Mornington Peninsula, Victoria	"I'm Outta Love" by Anastacia

- Anastacia appeared as a guest judge.

== Top 30 ==
=== Top 30 Part 1 (23 February) ===
Singer was Eliminated
Singer got put On Notice

Round 1 – Chorus Line
Group	Song	Singer	Result
Group 1	"Flowers"	Harlan Goode	Advanced
Group 1	"Flowers"	Natalie Lockhart	Advanced
Group 1	"Flowers"	Mat Rigby	Advanced
Group 1	"Flowers"	Rochelle Ballard	Eliminated
Group 1	"Flowers"	Lily-Grace Grant	Advanced
Group 2	"Fields of Gold"	Olivia Giaourtas	Advanced
Group 2	"Fields of Gold"	Harriet Kenworthy	Advanced
Group 2	"Fields of Gold"	Jacinta Guirguis	Advanced
Group 2	"Fields of Gold"	Simela Petridis	Advanced
Group 2	"Fields of Gold"	Kalani Artis	On Notice
Group 3	"Beggin'"	Harry Lamb	Advanced
Group 3	"Beggin'"	Lydia Virgo	Advanced
Group 3	"Beggin'"	Sophie Poidevin	Advanced
Group 3	"Beggin'"	Wanwue Tarpeh	Advanced
Group 3	"Beggin'"	Nicholas Storm	Eliminated
Group 4	"Somebody Like You"	Cody James	Advanced
Group 4	"Somebody Like You"	Riley Ziskey	Advanced
Group 4	"Somebody Like You"	Kesha Oayda	Advanced
Group 4	"Somebody Like You"	Vince Phillips	On Notice
Group 4	"Somebody Like You"	John Standley	Advanced
Group 5	"Wings"	Eva Ilov	On Notice
Group 5	"Wings"	Lachie Clue	Advanced
Group 5	"Wings"	Taiyo Marchand	Advanced
Group 5	"Wings"	Jamie Lamont	Advanced
Group 5	"Wings"	Achille Fong	Advanced
Group 6	"Battle Scars"	Charlie Moon	Advanced
Group 6	"Battle Scars"	Asher Iyer	Advanced
Group 6	"Battle Scars"	Tre Samuels	Advanced
Group 6	"Battle Scars"	Alita Santhosh	Advanced
Group 6	"Battle Scars"	Kahlia Henao	Eliminated

=== Top 30 Part 2 (24 February & 1 March) ===
Singers was Eliminated
Singers got put On Notice

Round 2 – Group Challenge
Group	Song	Singer	Result
Group 1	"We Found Love"	Tre Samuels	Advanced
Group 1	"We Found Love"	Charlie Moon	Advanced
Group 1	"We Found Love"	Simela Petridis	Advanced
Group 2	"Ordinary"	Mat Rigby	Eliminated
Group 2	"Ordinary"	Jamie Lamont	On Notice
Group 2	"Ordinary"	Alita Santhosh	On Notice
Group 3	"Can't Help Falling in Love"	Harry Lamb	Advanced
Group 3	"Can't Help Falling in Love"	Sophie Poidevin	On Notice
Group 3	"Can't Help Falling in Love"	Riley Ziskey	Eliminated
Group 4	"Problem"	Jacinta Guirguis	Advanced
Group 4	"Problem"	Wanwue Tarpeh	Advanced
Group 4	"Problem"	Eva Ilov	Advanced
Group 5	"I Don't Care"	Kalani Artis	Advanced
Group 5	"I Don't Care"	Harriet Kenworthy	Advanced
Group 5	"I Don't Care"	Kesha Oayda	Advanced
Group 6	"Every Breath You Take"	Taiyo Marchand	Advanced
Group 6	"Every Breath You Take"	Asher Iyer	On Notice
Group 6	"Every Breath You Take"	John Standley	Advanced
Group 7	"Believe"	Harlan Goode	Advanced
Group 7	"Believe"	Natalie Lockhart	Advanced
Group 7	"Believe"	Vince Phillips	Advanced
Group 8	"Can't Get You Out of My Head"	Olivia Giaourtas	Eliminated
Group 8	"Can't Get You Out of My Head"	Lydia Virgo	On Notice
Group 8	"Can't Get You Out of My Head"	Lachie Clue	On Notice
Group 9	"Mr. Brightside"	Lily-Grace Grant	Advanced
Group 9	"Mr. Brightside"	Cody James	Advanced
Group 9	"Mr. Brightside"	Achille Fong	Advanced

=== Top 30 Part 3 (2 & 3 March) ===
Singer	Order	Song	Result
Simela Petridis	1	"You've Got the Love"	Advanced
Harlan Goode	2	"Livin' on a Prayer"	Advanced
Cody James	3	"7 Minutes"	On Notice
Taiyo Marchand	4	"Can't Stop the Feeling!"	Advanced
Lydia Virgo	5	"Bang Bang"	Advanced
Kalani Artis	6	"Forever Young"	Advanced
Sophie Poidevin	7	"Material Girl "	On Notice
Wanwue Tarpeh	8	"Made You Look"	Advanced
Harry Lamb	9	"Brother"	On Notice
Charlie Moon	10	"Walking on Sunshine"	Advanced
Vince Phillips	11	"The Gambler"	On Notice
Lily-Grace Grant	12	"Don't You (Forget About Me)"	Advanced
Tre Samuels	13	"Because You Loved Me"	Advanced
Harriet Kenworthy	14	"Vampire"	Advanced
John Standley	15	"Johnny B. Goode"	Advanced
Eva Ilov	16	"Crush"	On Notice
Achille Fong	17	"A Thousand Miles"	Advanced
Natalie Lockhart	18	"Into You"	Eliminated
Jamie Lamont	19	"Knock on Wood"	Advanced
Asher Iyer	20	"Jump"	Advanced
Lachie Clue	21	"Thriller"	Eliminated
Kesha Oayda	22	"If I Can't Have You"	Advanced
Alita Santhosh	23	Love Don't Cost a Thing"	Eliminated
Jacinta Guirguis	24	"Don't Speak"	Advanced

- Jessica filled in for Kyle on Group Challenge and Live Audience.

== Top 21 ==
Over three nights, seven contestants will perform in front of a live audience, by the end of each round four singers will make it through to the top 12. The judges will also each be given one ‘FastPass’ which, whilst not exactly a Touchdown, works like a Golden Buzzer, automatically sending someone into the Top 12.

Singer received a "FastPass" and advanced to the Top 12
Singer did not make the Top 12

=== Top 21 Part 1 (9 March) ===
Singers Top 21 result
Singer	Order	Song	Result
Simela Petridis	1	"Alive"	Advanced
Taiyo Marchand	2	"Forget You"	Eliminated
Lily-Grace Grant	3	"(I Can’t Get No) Satisfaction"	Advanced
Charlie Moon	4	"With a Little Help from My Friends"	Advanced ("FastPass" given by Marcia)
Jamie Lamont	5	"I’m Every Woman"	Eliminated
Achille Fong	6	"Lifestyles of the Rich and Famous"	Eliminated
Kesha Oayda	7	"Take Me To Church"	Advanced

=== Top 21 Part 2 (10 March) ===
Singers Top 21 result
Singer	Order	Song	Result
Harriet Kenworthy	1	"I'm with You"	Eliminated
Asher Iyer	2	"Can't Hold Us"	Eliminated
Jacinta Guirguis	3	"Everywhere"	Advanced
Harry Lamb	4	"Somebody Told Me"	Advanced
Harlan Goode	5	"Chain Reaction"	Advanced ("FastPass" given by Kyle)
Sophie Poidevin	6	"Bette Davis Eyes"	Advanced
Cody James	7	"Castle on the Hill"	Eliminated

=== Top 21 Part 3 (11 March) ===
Singers Top 21 result
Singer	Order	Song	Result
John Standley	1	"I Feel Good"	Advanced
Eva Ilov	2	"Manchild"	Eliminated
Kalani Artis	3	"Wherever You Will Go"	Advanced ("FastPass" given by Amy)
Wanwue Tarpeh	4	"Only Girl in the World"	Advanced
Vince Phillips	5	"A Bar Song (Tipsy)"	Eliminated
Lydia Virgo	6	"Burn"	Eliminated
Tre Samuels	7	"I'll Make Love to You"	Advanced

== Top 12 Finalists ==
=== Kesha Oayda ===
Kesha Oayda, is from Jindabyne, New South Wales. She became the eleventh winner of Australian Idol on 14 April 2026.

Audition: "Die with a Smile" (Lady Gaga & Bruno Mars)
Top 30 Part 1: "Somebody Like You" (Keith Urban)
Top 30 Part 2: "I Don't Care" (Ed Sheeran & Justin Bieber)
Top 30 Part 3: "If I Can't Have You" (Shawn Mendes)
Top 21: "Take Me To Church" (Hozier)
Top 12: "Like a Prayer" (Madonna)
Top 12 - Bottom 4: "Lay Me Down" (Sam Smith)"
Top 10: "Hopelessly Devoted To You" (Olivia Newton-John) ~ Judges’ Choice
Top 8: "Physical" (Dua Lipa)
Top 8 - Bottom 4: "Girls Just Wanna Have Fun" (Cyndi Lauper)
Top 6: "The Climb" (Miley Cyrus)
Top 6: Head-to-head: "Dancing Queen" (ABBA)
Grand Finale – Top 3: "When We Were Young" (Adele)
Grand Finale – Top 3: "Shine" (Vanessa Amorosi)
Grand Finale – Top 3: "Man I Need" (Olivia Dean)
Grand Finale – Top 2: "Die with a Smile" (Lady Gaga & Bruno Mars) – Winner

=== Harlan Goode ===
Harlan Goode, is from Brisbane, Queensland. He finished as the runner-up on 14 April 2026.

Audition: "The Winner Takes It All" (ABBA)
Top 30 Part 1: "Flowers" (Miley Cyrus)
Top 30 Part 2: "Believe" (Cher)
Top 30 Part 3: "Livin' On A Prayer" (Bon Jovi)
Top 21: "Chain Reaction" (Diana Ross) ~ FastPass from Kyle Sandilands
Top 12: "Pure Imagination" (Josh Groban)
Top 10: "A Touch of Paradise" (Mondo Rock)
Top 8: "Somebody To Love" (Queen) ~ Judges’ Choice
Top 6: "I'm Still Standing" (Elton John)
Top 6: Head-to-head: "Scared to Be Lonely" (Martin Garrix & Dua Lipa)
Grand Finale – Top 3: "Fame" (Irene Cara)
Grand Finale – Top 3: "The Prayer" (Celine Dion & Andrea Bocelli)
Grand Finale – Top 3: "Don’t Stop Believin’" (Journey)
Grand Finale – Top 2: "The Winner Takes It All" (ABBA) – Runner-up

=== Kalani Artis ===
Kalani Artis, is from Central Coast, New South Wales. He reached the Grand Finale on 14 April 2026, but was eliminated prior to the final round of performances.

Audition: "Torn" (Natalie Imbruglia)
Top 30 Part 1: "Fields of Gold" (Sting)
Top 30 Part 2: "I Don't Care" (Ed Sheeran & Justin Bieber)
Top 30 Part 3: "Forever Young" (Alphaville)
Top 21: "Wherever You Will Go" (The Calling) ~ FastPass from Amy Shark
Top 12: "Take My Breath Away" (Berlin)
Top 10: "Dont Dream It’s Over" (Crowded House)
Top 8: "Pink Pony Club" (Chappell Roan)
Top 8 - Bottom 4: "Breakeven" (The Script)
Top 6: "As Long As You Love Me" (Backstreet Boys)
Top 6: Head-to-head: "Bruises" (Lewis Capaldi)
Grand Finale – Top 3: "Heroes" (David Bowie)
Grand Finale – Top 3: "Better Days" (Pete Murray)
Grand Finale – Top 3: "If I Could Turn Back Time" (Cher) – Eliminated on 14 April

=== Tre Samuels ===
Tre Samuels, is from Melbourne, Victoria.

Audition: "Back At One" (Brian McKnight)
Top 30 Part 1: "Battle Scars" (Guy Sebastian ft. Lupe Fiasco)
Top 30 Part 2: "We Found Love" (Rihanna ft. Calvin Harris)
Top 30 Part 3: "Because You Loved Me" (Celine Dion)
Top 21: "I'll Make Love To You" (Boyz II Men)
Top 12: "Let It Go" (Idina Menzel)
Top 10: "Stay" (The Kid Laroi & Justin Bieber) ~ Judges’ Choice
Top 8: "You’re Still the One" (Shania Twain)
Top 6: "I'll Be There" (The Jackson 5)
Top 6: Head-to-head: "Ordinary People" (John Legend) – Eliminated on 7 April

=== Jacinta Guirgius ===
Jacinta Guirguis, is from Bacchus Marsh, Victoria.

Audition: "Somebody That I Used To Know" (Gotye ft. Kimbra)
Top 30 Part 1: "Fields of Gold" (Sting)
Top 30 Part 2: "Problem" (Ariana Grande ft. Iggy Azalea)
Top 30 Part 3: "Don't Speak" (No Doubt)
Top 21: "Everywhere" (Fleetwood Mac)
Top 12: "Dreams " (The Cranberries)
Top 10: "On A Night Like This" (Kylie Minogue)
Top 10 - Bottom 4: "Scars To Your Beautiful" (Alessia Cara)
Top 8: "The Power of Love" (Celine Dion)
Top 6: "(I've Had) The Time of My Life" (Bill Medley & Jennifer Warnes)
Top 6: Head-to-head: "Kiss Me" (Sixpence None the Richer) – Eliminated on 7 April

=== John Standley ===
John Standley, is from Bunbury, Western Australia.

Audition: "Shout" (The Isley Brothers)
Top 30 Part 1: "Somebody Like You" (Keith Urban)
Top 30 Part 2: "Every Breath You Take" (The Police)
Top 30 Part 3: "Johnny B Goode" (Chuck Berry)
Top 21: "I Feel Good" (James Brown)
Top 12: "Oh, Pretty Woman" (Pretty Woman)
Top 10: "In The Summertime" (Thirsty Merc)
Top 8: "APT." (Rosé & Bruno Mars)
Top 6: "I Get Around" (The Beach Boys)
Top 6: Head-to-head: "Jailhouse Rock" (Elvis Presley) – Eliminated on 7 April

=== Charlie Moon ===
Charlie Moon, is from Perth, Western Australia.

Audition: "Birds of a Feather" (Billie Eilish)
Top 30 Part 1: "Battle Scars" (Guy Sebastian ft. Lupe Fiasco)
Top 30 Part 2: "We Found Love" (Rihanna ft. Calvin Harris)
Top 30 Part 3: "Walking on Sunshine" (Katrina and the Waves)
Top 21: "With A Little Help from My Friends" (The Beatles) ~ FastPass from Marcia Hines
Top 12: "My Girl" (The Temptations)
Top 10: "Fly Away" (Tones and I)
Top 10 - Bottom 4: "Dancing On My Own" (Calum Scott)
Top 8: "Attention" (Charlie Puth)
Top 8 - Bottom 4: "Isn’t She Lovely" (Stevie Wonder) – Eliminated on 30 March

=== Simela Petridis ===
Simela Petridis, is from Adelaide, South Australia.

Audition: "I Don't Want to Wait" (Paula Cole)
Top 30 Part 1: "Fields of Gold" (Sting)
Top 30 Part 2: "We Found Love" (Rihanna ft. Calvin Harris)
Top 30 Part 3: "You've Got The Love" (Candi Staton)
Top 21: "Alive" (Sia)
Top 12: "Circle of Life" (Elton John) ~ Judges’ Choice
Top 8: "Best Of You" (Foo Fighters)
Top 8 - Bottom 4: "I’m Like A Bird" (Nelly Furtado) – Eliminated on 30 March

=== Wanwue Tarpeh ===
Wanwue Tarpeh, is from Melbourne, Victoria.

Audition: "Man! I Feel Like A Woman" (Shania Twain)
Top 30 Part 1: "Beggin" (Moleskin)
Top 30 Part 2: "Problem" (Ariana Grande ft. Iggy Azalea)
Top 30 Part 3: "Made You Look" (Meghan Trainor)
Top 21: "Only Girl in the World" (Rihanna)
Top 12: "Holding Out for a Hero" (Bonnie Tyler) ~ Judges’ Choice
Top 10: "Can’t Touch It" (Ricki-Lee Coulter)
Top 10 - Bottom 2: "Price Tag" (Jessie J ft. B.o.B) – Eliminated on 24 March

=== Harry Lamb ===
Harry Lamb, is from Ballarat, Victoria.

Audition: "Eye of The Tiger" (Survivor)
Top 30 Part 1: "Beggin" (Måneskin)
Top 30 Part 2: "Can't Help Falling In Love" (Elvis Presley)
Top 30 Part 3: "Brother" (Matt Corby)
Top 21: "Somebody Told Me" (The Killers)
Top 12: "Born to Be Wild" (Steppenwolf)
Top 12 - Bottom 4: "Don't Look Back in Anger" (Oasis)
Top 10: "White Noise" (The Living End)
Top 10 - Bottom 2: "How To Save A Life" (The Fray) – Eliminated on 24 March

=== Sophie Poidevin ===
Sophie Poidevin, is from Gold Coast, Queensland.

Audition: "Make You Feel My Love" (Adele) / "Tainted Love" (Gloria Jones)
Top 30 Part 1: "Beggin" (Måneskin)
Top 30 Part 2: "Can't Help Falling In Love" (Elvis Presley)
Top 30 Part 3: "Material Girl" (Madonna)
Top 21: "Bette Davis Eyes" (Kim Carnes)
Top 12: "Diamonds Are a Girl's Best Friend" (Marilyn Monroe)
Top 12 - Bottom 2: "Whatta Man" (Dave Crawford) – Eliminated on 17 March

=== Lily-Grace Grant ===
Lily-Grace Grant, is from Northern Rivers, New South Wales.

Audition: "What You Get Is What You See” (Nina Turner)
Top 30 Part 1: "Flowers" (Miley Cyrus)
Top 30 Part 2: "Mr. Brightside" (The Killers)
Top 30 Part 3: "Don't You (Forget About Me)" (Simple Minds)
Top 21: "(I Can't Get No) Satisfaction" (The Rolling Stones)
Top 12: "Suddenly I See" (KT Tunstall)
Top 12 – Bottom 2: "Sweet Home Alabama" (Lynyrd Skynyrd) – Eliminated on 17 March

== Group/guest performances ==
Week	Performer(s)	Title
Top 12	Top 12 with Guy Sebastian	"Choir"
Top 12	Top 12	"All Night Long (All Night)"
Top 10	Top 10	"Touch"
Top 10	Budjerah	"Gentleman"
Top 8	Top 8	KPop Demon Hunters medley
Top 8	Dylan Wright	"Those Nights"
Top 6	Marshall Hamburger	"Thought Of You!"
Top 6	Top 6	"Set Fire to the Rain"
Top 6	Marcia Hines	"No More Tears (Enough Is Enough)"
Top 3	Morgan Evans	Letting You Go
Top 3	Top 12	"I Love You Always Forever"
Top 3	Amy Shark	"Soft Pop"

== Weekly Song Themes ==
Date	Week	Theme
15–17 March	Top 12	Movie Week
22–24 March	Top 10	Aussie Week
29–30 March	Top 8	Super Twist Week
6–7 April	Top 6	Heroes and Tributes Week
13–14 April	Top 3	Grand Finale

== Live performances ==
During each round of the live performances, each contestant sings a song with a given theme. After all contestants have sung, the judges choose one contestant to directly advance to the next stage; then, the public is given approximately 24 hours to vote for their favourite singers. During the results night, after voting has closed, the four contestants with the fewest votes sing again—in pairs. The singer with the lowest number of votes, per each pair, is eliminated from the competition.

=== Top 12 (15–17 March) ===
Singer received immunity and advanced to the next stage
Singer was in the bottom two/four
Singer was eliminated

Singers Top 12 Result
Singer	Order	Song	Movie	Result
Live Acts Night 1
Charlie Moon	1	"My Girl"	"My Girl"	Safe
Lily-Grace Grant	2	"Suddenly I See"	"The Devil Wears Prada"	Bottom 2
Kalani Artis	3	"Take My Breath Away"	"Top Gun"	Safe
Harry Lamb	4	"Born To Be Wild"	"Easy Rider"	Bottom 2
Simela Petridis	5	"Circle of Life"	"The Lion King"	Judges' Save
Jacinta Guirguis	6	"Dreams"	"You've Got Mail"	Safe
Live Acts Night 2
Kesha Oayda	1	"Like a Prayer"	"Deadpool & Wolverine"	Bottom 2
John Standley	2	"Oh, Pretty Woman"	"Pretty Woman"	Safe
Harlan Goode	3	"Pure Imagination"	"Willy Wonka & The Chocolate Factory"	Safe
Wanwue Tarpeh	4	"Holding Out For A Hero"	"Shrek 2"	Judges' Save
Tre Samuels	5	"Let It Go"	"Frozen"	Safe
Sophie Poidevin	6	"Diamonds Are a Girl's Best Friend"	"Gentlemen Prefer Blondes"	Bottom 2
Songs on results night
Pair 1
Lily-Grace Grant	1	"Sweet Home Alabama"		Eliminated
Harry Lamb	2	"Don't Look Back in Anger"		Safe
Pair 2
Kesha Oayda	1	"Lay Me Down"		Safe
Sophie Poidevin	2	"Whatta Man"		Eliminated

=== Top 10 (22–24 March) ===
Singer received immunity and advanced to the next stage
Singer was in the bottom two/four
Singer was eliminated

Singers Top 10 Result
Singer	Order	Song	Result
Live Acts Night 1
John Standley	1	"In The Summertime"	Safe
Kalani Artis	2	"Dont Dream It’s Over"	Safe
Jacinta Guirguis	3	"On A Night Like This"	Bottom 2
Harry Lamb	4	"White Noise"	Bottom 2
Kesha Oayda	5	"Hopelessly Devoted To You"	Judges’ Save
Live Acts Night 2
Charlie Moon	1	"Fly Away"	Bottom 2
Harlan Goode	2	"A Touch of Paradise"	Safe
Wanwue Tarpeh	3	"Can’t Touch It"	Bottom 2
Tre Samuels	4	"Stay"	Judges’ Save
Simela Petridis	5	"Buses and Trains"	Safe
Songs on results night
Pair 1
Jacinta Guirguis	1	"Scars To Your Beautiful"	Safe
Harry Lamb	2	"How To Save A Life"	Eliminated
Pair 2
Charlie Moon	1	"Dancing On My Own"	Safe
Wanwue Tarpeh	2	"Price Tag"	Eliminated

=== Top 8 (29-30 March) ===
Singer received immunity and advanced to the next stage
Singer was in the bottom two/four
Singer was eliminated

Singers Top 8 result
Singer	Order	Song	Result
Harlan Goode	1	"Somebody To Love"	Judges’ Save
Kesha Oayda	2	"Physical"	Bottom 4
John Standley	3	"APT."	Safe
Simela Petridis	4	"Best Of You"	Bottom 4
Tre Samuels	5	"You’re Still the One"	Safe
Kalani Artis	6	"Pink Pony Club"	Bottom 4
Jacinta Guirguis	7	"The Power of Love"	Safe
Charlie Moon	8	"Attention"	Bottom 4
Songs on results night
Kesha Oayda	1	"Girls Just Wanna Have Fun"	Safe
Simela Petridis	2	"I’m Like A Bird"	Eliminated
Kalani Artis	3	"Breakeven"	Safe
Charlie Moon	4	"Isn’t She Lovely"	Eliminated

=== Top 6 (6–7 April) ===
Singers Top 6 result
Singer	Order	Song	Song dedicated to	Result
Kesha Oayda	1	"The Climb"	Her Dad	—N/a
Harlan Goode	2	"I'm Still Standing"	His Mum, His Nana, His High School Teacher	—N/a
John Standley	3	"I Get Around"	His hometown of Bunbury	—N/a
Tre Samuels	4	"I'll Be There"	His Father	—N/a
Jacinta Guirguris	5	"(I've Had) The Time of My Life"	Her Mum	—N/a
Kalani Artis	6	"As Long As You Love Me"	His Nana	—N/a
Songs on results night
John Standley	Pair 1	"Jailhouse Rock"		Eliminated
Harlan Goode	Pair 1	"Scared to Be Lonely"		Safe
Jacinta Guirguis	Pair 2	"Kiss Me"		Eliminated
Kalani Artis	Pair 2	"Bruises"		Safe
Tre Samuels	Pair 3	"Ordinary People "		Eliminated
Kesha Oayda	Pair 3	"Dancing Queen"		Safe

=== Grand Finale (13–14 April) ===
Winner
Runner-Up
Eliminated

==== Performance night ====
Singer	Order	Solo	Order	Celebrity Duet (listed in bold)	Result
Kalani Artis	1	"Heroes"	4	"Better Days" with **Pete Murray**	Eliminated
Harlan Goode	2	"Fame"	6	"The Prayer" with **Anthony Callea**	Runner-Up
Kesha Oayda	3	"When We Were Young"	5	"Shine" with **Vanessa Amorosi**	**Winner**

==== Results night ====
Singer	Order	Free Choice	Order	Audition Song	Result
Harlan Goode	1	"Don’t Stop Believin’"	4	"The Winner Takes It All"	Runner-Up
Kesha Oayda	2	"Man I Need"	5	"Die with a Smile"	**Winner**
Kalani Artis	3	"If I Could Turn Back Time"	N/A	"Torn"	Eliminated

== Elimination chart ==
Females	Males	Top 21	Top 12	Top 12 "FastPass"	Winner

Did Not Perform	Safe	Bottom 2/4	Judges’ Vote	Eliminated

Stage:		Top 21			Finals				
Week:		9/3	10/3	11/3	17/3	24/3	30/3	7/4	14/4
Place	Contestant	Result							
1	Kesha Oayda	Top 12			Bottom 2 (16/3)	Top 8	Bottom 4		Winner
2	Harlan Goode		Top 12				Top 6		Runner-up
3	Kalani Artis			Top 12			Bottom 4		Eliminated
4-6	Tre Samuels			Top 12		Top 8		Eliminated	
4-6	Jacinta Guirguis		Top 12			Bottom 2 (22/3)		Eliminated	
4-6	John Standley			Top 12				Eliminated	
7-8	Charlie Moon	Top 12				Bottom 2 (23/3)	Eliminated		
7-8	Simela Petridis	Top 12			Top 10		Eliminated		
9-10	Wanwue Tarpeh			Top 12	Top 10	Eliminated			
9-10	Harry Lamb		Top 12		Bottom 2 (15/3)	Eliminated			
11-12	Sophie Poidevin		Top 12		Eliminated				
11-12	Lily-Grace Grant	Top 12			Eliminated				
Top 21 (Part 3)	Vince Phillips			Eliminated					
Top 21 (Part 3)	Lydia Virgo			Eliminated					
Top 21 (Part 3)	Eva Ilov			Eliminated					
Top 21 (Part 2)	Asher Iyer		Eliminated						
Top 21 (Part 2)	Cody James		Eliminated						
Top 21 (Part 2)	Harriet Kenworthy		Eliminated						
Top 21 (Part 1)	Taiyo Marchand	Eliminated							
Top 21 (Part 1)	Achille Fong	Eliminated							
Top 21 (Part 1)	Jamie Lamont	Eliminated							

== Ratings ==
Episode		Original airdate	Timeslot	National reach viewers (millions)	National total viewers (millions)	Night rank	Source
1	"Auditions"	2 February 2026	Monday 7:30 pm	1.819	0.904	4	
2	"Auditions"	3 February 2026	Tuesday 7:30 pm	1.709	0.861	5	
3	"Auditions"	8 February 2026	Sunday 7:00 pm	1.910	0.872	6	
4	"Auditions"	9 February 2026	Monday 7:30 pm	1.643	0.837	7	
5	"Auditions"	15 February 2026	Sunday 7:00 pm	1.945	0.886	6	
6	"Auditions"	16 February 2026	Monday 7:30 pm	1.554	0.776	6	
7	"Auditions"	22 February 2026	Sunday 7:00 pm	1.769	0.817	5	
8	"Top 30 Week"	23 February 2026	Monday 7:30 pm	1.398	0.762	7	
9	"Top 30 Week"	24 February 2026	Tuesday 7:30 pm	1.652	0.750	6	
10	"Top 30 Week"	1 March 2026	Sunday 7:00 pm	1.783	0.911	5	
11	"Top 30 Week"	2 March 2026	Monday 7:30 pm	1.585	0.826	6	
12	"Top 30 Week"	3 March 2026	Tuesday 7:30 pm	1.556	0.766	5	
13	"Top 21"	9 March 2026	Monday 7:30 pm	1.620	0.884	5	
14	"Top 21"	10 March 2026	Tuesday 7:30 pm	1.739	0.898	5	
15	"Top 21"	11 March 2026	Wednesday 7:30 pm	1.653	0.833	5	
16	"Top 12"	15 March 2026	Sunday 7:00 pm	1.993	0.874	5	
17	"Top 12"	16 March 2026	Monday 7:30 pm	1.721	0.887	5	
18	"Top 12"	17 March 2026	Tuesday 7:30 pm	1.480	0.844	7	
19	"Top 10"	22 March 2026	Sunday 7:00 pm	1.794	0.938	5	
20	"Top 10"	23 March 2026	Monday 7:30 pm	1.512	0.922	5	
21	"Top 10"	24 March 2026	Tuesday 7:30 pm	1.477	0.869	7	
22	"Top 8"	29 March 2026	Sunday 7:00 pm	1.929	0.932	4	
23	"Top 8"	30 March 2026	Monday 7:30 pm	1.572	0.910	5	
24	"Top 6"	6 April 2026	Monday 7:30 pm	1.611	0.882	6	
25	"Top 6"	7 April 2026	Tuesday 7:30 pm	1.469	0.916	7	
26	"Grand Finale"	13 April 2026	Monday 7:30 pm	1.719	0.951	5	
27	"Grand Finale"	14 April 2026	Tuesday 7:30 pm	1.895	1.088	3	
