= Kesha Oayda =

Australian singer and songwriter

- Origin: Jindabyne, Australia
- Genre: pop
- Occupations: Singer; songwriter
- Instrument: Vocals
- Years active: 2026–present

Kesha Oayda is an Australian singer and songwriter who won the eleventh season of Australian Idol in 2026. She officially won the title in April 2026, taking home the $100,000 prize and recording studio package with Hive Sound Studios. Additionally Oayda will receive marketing and social media support from The Annex, and VIP tickets to events including the 2025 ARIA Music Awards and the Logie Awards of 2026.

== Early life ==
Oayda grew up in Jindabyne, Australia. After winning Idol in 2026 she said to a Snowy Mountains tourism site, "It was pretty special having skiing as a school sport from such a young age and spending whole days and weekends on the snow – that's something I never took for granted. It's such a rare opportunity, especially in Australia."

== Career ==
=== 2026: Australian Idol ===
In 2026, Oayda auditioned for the eleventh season of Seven Network's singing competition Australian Idol with the song "Die with a Smile". Oayda was officially revealed to be the winner on 14 April 2026.

Australian Idol performances and results
Round		Song	Original artist	Result
Auditions		"Die with a Smile"	Lady Gaga and Bruno Mars	Through to top 30
Top 30	Part 1	"Somebody Like You"	Keith Urban	Advanced
Top 30	Part 2	"I Don't Care"	Ed Sheeran and Justin Bieber	Advanced
Top 30	Part 3	"If I Can't Have You"	Shawn Mendes	Through to top 21
Top 21		"Take Me to Church"	Hozier	Through to top 12
Top 12 (Movie Week)	Performance 1	"Like a Prayer"	Madonna	Bottom 4
Top 12 (Movie Week)	Bottom 4	"Lay Me Down"	Sam Smith	Saved. Through to top 10
Top 10 (Aussie Week)		"Hopelessly Devoted to You"	Olivia Newton-John	Through to top 8
Top 8 (Super Twist Week)	Performance 1	"Physical"	Dua Lipa	Bottom 4
Top 8 (Super Twist Week)	Bottom 4	"Girls Just Wanna Have Fun"	Cyndi Lauper	Saved. Through to top 6
Top 6 (Heroes and Tributes Week)	Performance 1	"The Climb"	Miley Cyrus	Through to Grand Finale (top 3)
Top 6 (Heroes and Tributes Week)	Performance 2 (head-to-head vs Tre Samuels)	"Dancing Queen"	ABBA	Through to Grand Finale (top 3)
Grand Finale (top 3)	Solo	"When We Were Young"	Adele	Through to top 2
Grand Finale (top 3)	Celebrity Duet	"Shine" (with Vanessa Amorosi)	Vanessa Amorosi	Through to top 2
Grand Finale (top 2)	Free choice	"Man I Need"	Olivia Dean	Winner
Grand Finale (top 2)	Audition song	"Die with a Smile"	Lady Gaga and Bruno Mars	Winner

Oayda's The Idol Collection album was released on 17 April 2026, featuring ten songs she performed on the show and the top 12 performance of "All Night Long". The album debuted at number 31 on the ARIA Album chart.

== Discography ==
=== Studio albums ===
Title	Details	Peak chart positions
Title	Details	AUS
The Idol Collection	Released: 17 April 2026; Label: 19 Recordings	31

Preceded by Marshall Hamburger	Australian Idol; Winner; Season 11 (2026)	Succeeded by
