= Kevin Patrick Egan =

Irish sports commentator and wrestling personality

Kevin Egan
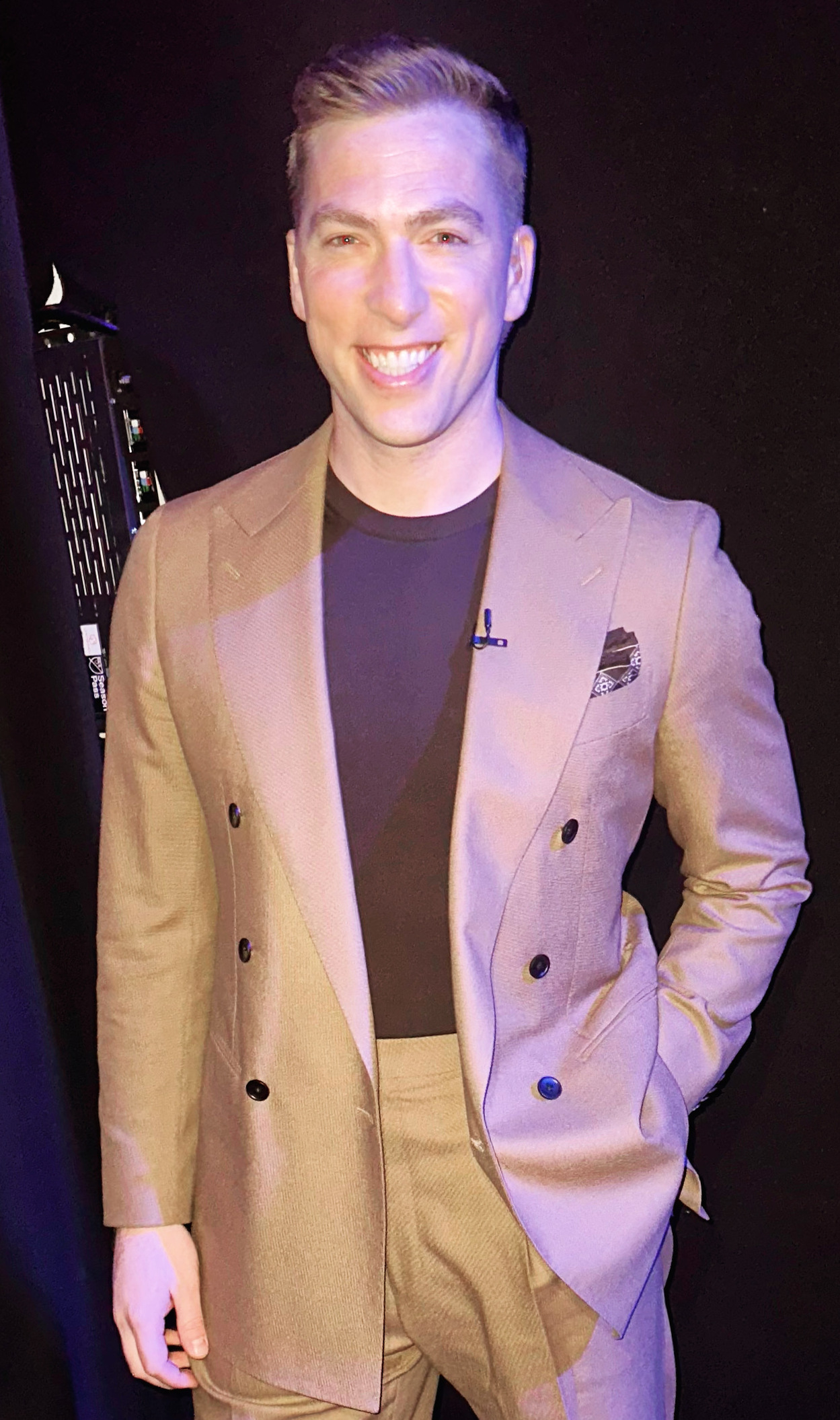
- Egan in 2024

Personal information
- Born: Kevin Patrick Egan Raheny, Dublin, Ireland
- Education: Griffith College Dublin

Professional wrestling career
- Ring name: Kevin Patrick
- Billed from: Dublin, Ireland
- Debut: 2021

Kevin Egan is an Irish sports broadcaster, TV personality and public speaker. Egan is known for his work covering global football, as well as his tenure in WWE. As of 2024, he is lead host for Apple TV+ flagship show MLS 360, and resides in the United States with his wife and two children.

== Background ==
Egan is from Raheny in north Dublin, Ireland. His father Liam was an All-Ireland-winning gaelic footballer. Kevin was a member of Raheny GAA. He studied journalism at Griffith College Dublin.

Egan worked for RTÉ Sport as a runner at the 2004 Summer Olympics. He progressed through the ranks in RTE, working both behind the scenes and on air, before making the move Stateside.

== Career ==
Egan moved to Chicago in 2009. Throughout his career covering soccer in the US, Egan has worked for the Big Ten Network, Chicago Fire, 120 Sports, beIN Sports, CNN, Atlanta United and on occasion, Turner Sports, ESPN and FOX Sports. Apple TV+ announced Egan as a play-by-play commentator for their inaugural season in 2023, before unveiling him as lead host of 'MLS 360' in 2024. 'MLS 360' is a 4-hour live "whip-around" show from Apple TV's studios in Manhattan, New York.

Egan began working for the WWE in 2021 under the ring name Kevin Patrick. Initially hired as a backstage reporter, Egan later presented studio programs and co-hosted WWE kickoff shows. He became a commentator on Raw in October 2022 before moving to SmackDown in 2023. On 23 January 2024, it was reported that Egan was removed from the SmackDown commentary team. Two days later, it was reported that he was released from his contract. Egan commented that his departure from WWE was amicable, and that it was "time to turn the page".

Egan returned to commentating Atlanta United games shortly after his release from WWE.

Preceded by Jimmy Smith	Raw lead announcer 2022–2023	Succeeded by Michael Cole
Preceded by Michael Cole	SmackDown lead announcer 2023–2024	Succeeded by Corey Graves
