= I Feel Good =

2021 single by Pitbull

Single by Pitbull featuring Anthony Watts and DJWS
- Released: August 20, 2021
- Length: 2:52
- Label: Mr. 305
- Songwriter(s): Anthony Pavel; Armando Christian Pérez; Benjamin Shapiro; BLKMKT; Dino Zisis; Edwin Paredes; Felicia Ferraro; Issac Mahmood Noell; Lazaro Mendez; Paul Edward Blair; Robert Fernandez; Salvi Vila Carreras
- Producer(s): DJ White Shadow; Dino Zisis; Sak Noel; Salvi

Pitbull singles chronology
"Flavor" (2021)	"I Feel Good" (2021)	"Can't Stop Us Now" (2022)

Music video
- "I Feel Good" on YouTube

"I Feel Good" is a song by American rapper Pitbull featuring producers Anthony Watts and DJWS. It was released on August 20, 2021, via Mr. 305 Records.

== Composition ==
The song is written in the key of G♭ major, with a tempo of 125 beats per minute.

== Charts ==
=== Weekly charts ===
Weekly chart performance for "I Feel Good"
Chart (2021–2022)	Peak position
Canada (Canadian Hot 100)	87
Canada CHR/Top 40 (Billboard)	23
US Hot Dance/Electronic Songs (Billboard)	7
US Pop Airplay (Billboard)	20

=== Year-end charts ===
2021 year-end chart performance for "I Feel Good"
Chart (2021)	Position
US Hot Dance/Electronic Songs (Billboard)	66

2022 year-end chart performance for "I Feel Good"
Chart (2022)	Position
US Hot Dance/Electronic Songs (Billboard)	30

== Release history ==
Release history for "I Feel Good"
Region	Date	Format	Label	Ref.
Various	August 20, 2021	Digital download; streaming	Mr. 305	
United States	September 13, 2021	Adult contemporary radio	Mr. 305	
United States	September 21, 2021	Contemporary hit radio	Mr. 305	
