= Australian Idol season 9 =

Season of television series

Australian Idol
- Season 9
- Hosted by: Ricki-Lee Coulter; Scott Tweedie
- Judges: Kyle Sandilands; Amy Shark; Marcia Hines
- Winner: Dylan Wright
- Runner-up: Amy Reeves
- Finals venue: Sydney Coliseum Theatre

Release
- Original network: Seven Network
- Original release: 29 January – 25 March 2024

Season chronology
- ← Previous; Season 8 Next → Season 10

- Australian Idol (season 9)
- Finalists (with dates of elimination)
Dylan Wright	Winner
Amy Reeves	Runner-up
Denvah Baker-Moller	25 March
Trent Richardson	18 March
Isaac McCallum	18 March
Ivana Ilic	18 March
Drea Onamade	11 March
Kiani Smith	11 March
Tyler Hammill	5 March
TJ Zimba	5 March
Ripley Alexander	27 February
Imogen Spendlove	27 February

The ninth season of Australian Idol premiered on 29 January 2024. It is the show's second season to air on Seven Network, after the network bought the rights to the series from Network 10. The grand final was won by Dylan Wright who released his winner's single, "Paper Heart", on 25th March 2024.

== Production ==
In July 2023, it was officially revealed that the show had been renewed by Seven Network for a ninth season, set to premiere in 2024. It was later revealed that Ricki Lee Coulter and Scott Tweedie would return as hosts, and that Kyle Sandilands and Amy Shark would be returning to their judging positions. However, Harry Connick Jr and Meghan Trainor would not return, with Trainor leaving due to family reasons. Original judge Marcia Hines returned as a main judge. Seven officially confirmed the 2024 judges at their upfronts in October 2023.

== Auditions ==
Auditions were held in various cities around Australia. In a few cases, a single judge visited a remote location to audition contestants by themselves. For the first time on any show with the Idol format, contestants were not guaranteed a "golden ticket" if they got two or three "yes" votes from the judges. Instead, they were sent to a holding area until the end of the day, when the judges would further narrow down the contestants they saw, potentially have some contestants sing again, and decide who made the Top 30, down from 50 in the previous season.

Singer did not receive a golden ticket

=== Auditions 1 (29 January) ===
Singers that received a golden ticket
Singer	Age	Hometown	Song
Dylan Wright	30	Bangalow, New South Wales	"Better Be Home Soon" by Crowded House
Ivana Ilic	20	Mill Park, Victoria	"If I Ain't Got You" by Alicia Keys
Ripley Alexander	19	Brisbane, Queensland	"Mamma Mia" by ABBA
Billy Menhennet	20	Smythes Creek, Victoria	"Something in the Orange" by Zach Bryan

=== Auditions 2 (30 January) ===
Singers that received a golden ticket
Singer	Age	Hometown	Song
Amy Reeves	24	Broome, Western Australia	"A Natural Woman" by Aretha Franklin
Trent Richardson	22	Emu Park, Queensland	"Bless the Broken Road" by Rascal Flatts
Tyler Hammill	21	Alexandra Headland, Queensland	"Lonely Boy" by The Black Keys
Natasha Rose	19	Burpengary, Queensland	"Hands to Myself" by Selena Gomez
Cynthia Negash	19	Kurunjang, Victoria	"Something's Got a Hold on Me" by Etta James

=== Auditions 3 (31 January) ===
Singers that received a golden ticket
Singer	Age	Hometown	Song
Drea Onamade	25	Perth, Western Australia	"American Boy" by Estelle
Jake Carlson	20	Mernda, Victoria	"I Won't Give Up" by Jason Mraz
Saoirse Harding	19	Gold Coast, Queensland	"I Love You" by Billie Eilish
Jonathan Wells	28	Melbourne, Victoria	"SexyBack" by Justin Timberlake

=== Auditions 4 (4 February) ===
Singers that received a golden ticket
Singer	Age	Hometown	Song
Isaac McCallum	23	Burrill Lake, New South Wales	"Bruises" by Lewis Capaldi
Jet Cameron	16	Fig Tree Pocket, Queensland	"This City" by Sam Fischer
Bethany Byrne	28	Mooroolbark, Victoria	"Afterglow" by Ed Sheeran
Kym Miaco	28	Lightsview, South Australia	"P.Y.T." by Michael Jackson
Jesse Lazaroo	18	Perth, Western Australia	"Talking to the Moon" by Bruno Mars

=== Auditions 5 (5 February) ===
Singers that received a golden ticket
Singer	Age	Hometown	Song
Denvah Baker-Moller	23	Rockhampton, Queensland	"Pony" by Kasey Chambers
Gab Hester	18	Rye, Victoria	"Down Under" by Men at Work
Jackson Smith	25	Melbourne, Victoria	"Eyes Closed" by Ed Sheeran
Jess Chalmers	24	Melbourne, Victoria	"Domino" by Jessie J

=== Auditions 6 (6 February) ===
Singers that received a golden ticket
Singer	Age	Hometown	Song
Prayer Corby	23	Humpty Doo, Northern Territory	"Big Jet Plane" by Angus & Julia Stone
Kiani Smith	17	Bribie Island, Queensland	"2002" by Anne-Marie
Kobe White	24	Keysborough, Victoria	"Just the Way You Are" by Bruno Mars
Olivia Britton	23	Wodonga, Victoria	"I Kissed a Girl" by Katy Perry
Eli Parr	20	Loganholme, Queensland	"Story of My Life" by One Direction

=== Auditions 7 (7 February) ===
Singers that received a golden ticket
Singer	Age	Hometown	Song
TJ Zimba	24	Karratha, Western Australia	"Location" by Khalid
Imogen Spendlove	23	Melbourne, Victoria	"I Have Nothing" by Whitney Houston
Chenai Boucher	26	Seaford, Victoria	"River" by Bishop Briggs

== Top 30 ==
=== Top 30 Part 1 (11 February) ===
Singers did not make it
Singers got put On Notice

Round 1 – Chorus Line
Group	Song	Singer	Result
Group 1	"Always Remember Us This Way"	Amy Reeves	Advanced
Group 1	"Always Remember Us This Way"	Dylan Wright	Advanced
Group 1	"Always Remember Us This Way"	Kiani Smith	Advanced
Group 1	"Always Remember Us This Way"	Bethany Byrne	On Notice
Group 1	"Always Remember Us This Way"	Jake Carlson	Advanced
Group 2	"Castle on the Hill"	Trent Richardson	Advanced
Group 2	"Castle on the Hill"	Denvah Baker-Moller	Advanced
Group 2	"Castle on the Hill"	Billy Menhennet	Eliminated
Group 2	"Castle on the Hill"	Jesse Lazaroo	Advanced
Group 2	"Castle on the Hill"	Tyler Hammill	Advanced
Group 3	"Addicted to You "	Cynthia Negash	Eliminated
Group 3	"Addicted to You "	Natasha Rose	Advanced
Group 3	"Addicted to You "	Drea Onamade	Advanced
Group 3	"Addicted to You "	Olivia Britton	Advanced
Group 3	"Addicted to You "	Ivana Ilic	Advanced
Group 4	"Grenade"	Prayer Corby	Advanced
Group 4	"Grenade"	Jet Cameron	On Notice
Group 4	"Grenade"	Isaac McCallum	Advanced
Group 4	"Grenade"	Saoirse Harding	Advanced
Group 4	"Grenade"	Kym Miaco	Advanced
Group 5	"Blinding Lights"	Jess Chalmers	On Notice
Group 5	"Blinding Lights"	Kobe White	Advanced
Group 5	"Blinding Lights"	TJ Zimba	Advanced
Group 5	"Blinding Lights"	Imogen Spendlove	Advanced
Group 5	"Blinding Lights"	Jonathan Wells	Advanced
Group 6	"Radioactive "	Eli Parr	Eliminated
Group 6	"Radioactive "	Ripley Alexander	Advanced
Group 6	"Radioactive "	Chenai Boucher	Advanced
Group 6	"Radioactive "	Jackson Smith	Advanced
Group 6	"Radioactive "	Gab Hester	Advanced

=== Top 30 Part 2 (12 February) ===
Singers did not make it
Singers got put On Notice

Round 2 – Group Challenge
Group	Song	Singer	Result
Group 1	"Killing Me Softly with His Song"	Kym Miaco	Advanced
Group 1	"Killing Me Softly with His Song"	Ivana Ilic	Advanced
Group 1	"Killing Me Softly with His Song"	Jonathan Wells	On Notice
Group 2	"Torn"	Kobe White	Advanced
Group 2	"Torn"	Amy Reeves	Advanced
Group 2	"Torn"	Dylan Wright	Advanced
Group 3	"One Call Away"	Trent Richardson	Advanced
Group 3	"One Call Away"	Ripley Alexander	Advanced
Group 3	"One Call Away"	Saoirse Harding	Advanced
Group 4	"Nothing Breaks Like a Heart"	Olivia Britton	Advanced
Group 4	"Nothing Breaks Like a Heart"	Jet Cameron	Eliminated
Group 4	"Nothing Breaks Like a Heart"	Imogen Spendlove	Advanced
Group 5	"Counting Stars"	Jesse Lazaroo	Advanced
Group 5	"Counting Stars"	Jake Carlson	Advanced
Group 5	"Counting Stars"	Natasha Rose	Advanced
Group 6	"Teenage Dream "	Gab Hester	Eliminated
Group 6	"Teenage Dream "	Chenai Boucher	On Notice
Group 6	"Teenage Dream "	TJ Zimba	On Notice
Group 7	"Circles"	Jess Chalmers	Advanced
Group 7	"Circles"	Jackson Smith	Advanced
Group 7	"Circles"	Drea Onamade	Advanced
Group 8	"Stand by Me "	Kiani Smith	On Notice
Group 8	"Stand by Me "	Tyler Hamill	Advanced
Group 8	"Stand by Me "	Prayer Corby	Eliminated
Group 9	"Perfect "	Isaac McCallum	On Notice
Group 9	"Perfect "	Bethany Byrne	Advanced
Group 9	"Perfect "	Denvah Baker-Moller	Advanced

=== Top 30 Part 3 (13 & 14 February ) ===
Singers did not make it
Singers got put On Notice

24 contestants reached this round. Each contestant sang a song solo in front of a live audience. The judges then decided who would progress to the final 21.

Singer	Order	Song	Result
Drea Onamade	1	"That's What I Like "	Advanced
Trent Richardson	2	"Stay "	Advanced
Amy Reeves	3	"Clarity "	Advanced
Kiani Smith	4	"You're the One That I Want"	On Notice
Imogen Spendlove	5	"Against All Odds (Take a Look at Me Now)"	Advanced
TJ Zimba	6	"Airplanes"	Advanced
Chenai Boucher	7	"Kryptonite "	Advanced
Denvah Baker-Moller	8	"Yellow"	Advanced
Jake Carlson	9	"Wish You the Best"	Advanced
Natasha Rose	10	"Bad Romance"	Advanced
Kobe White	11	"You're Still the One"	Advanced
Jonathan Wells	12	"Attention"	Eliminated
Jess Chalmers	13	"Break Free"	Eliminated
Isaac McCallum	14	"7 Years"	On Notice
Tyler Hamill	15	"Budapest"	Advanced
Ivana Ilic	16	"Came Here for Love"	Advanced
Ripley Alexander	17	"Heart of Glass"	Advanced
Olivia Britton	18	"Genie in a Bottle"	On Notice
Bethany Byrne	19	"Kiss Me "	On Notice
Jackson Smith	20	"You Broke Me First"	On Notice
Kym Miaco	21	"Touch"	Advanced
Saoirse Harding	22	"Jealous"	Advanced
Jesse Lazaroo	23	"Say Something "	Eliminated
Dylan Wright	24	"Sorrento Moon (I Remember)"	Advanced

== Top 21 ==
Over three rounds, seven singers will perform in front of a live audience, by the end of each round four singers will make it through to the top 12. The judges will also each be given one ‘FastPass’ which, whilst not exactly a Touchdown, works like a Golden Buzzer, automatically sending someone into the Top 12.

Singer received a "FastPass" and advanced to the Top 12
Singer did not make the Top 12

=== Top 21 Part 1 (18 February) ===
Singers Top 21 result
Singer	Order	Song	Result
Dylan Wright	1	"Walking in Memphis"	Advanced
Drea Onamade	2	"New Rules"	Advanced
Ripley Alexander	3	"Back for Good"	Advanced
Imogen Spendlove	4	"From This Moment On"	Advanced ("FastPass" given by Marcia)
Bethany Byrne	5	"Used to Be Young"	Eliminated
Kobe White	6	"When I Was Your Man"	Eliminated
Chenai Boucher	7	"Zombie"	Eliminated

=== Top 21 Part 2 (19 February) ===
Singers Top 21 result
Singer	Order	Song	Result
Amy Reeves	1	"Think "	Advanced
Trent Richardson	2	"Heaven"	Advanced
Natasha Rose	3	"Part of Me"	Eliminated
Isaac McCallum	4	"Say You Won't Let Go"	Advanced ("FastPass" given by Amy)
Ivana Ilic	5	"Remember"	Advanced
Jackson Smith	6	"Hero"	Eliminated
Saoirse Harding	7	"Scars to Your Beautiful"	Eliminated

=== Top 21 Part 3 (20 February) ===
Singers Top 21 result
Singer	Order	Song	Result
Jake Carlson	1	"Take Me Back"	Eliminated
Denvah Baker-Moller	2	"Perfect"	Advanced
Kym Miaco	3	"Mamma Knows Best"	Eliminated
Tyler Hammill	4	"Waves "	Advanced ("FastPass" given by Kyle)
Olivia Britton	5	"Greedy"	Eliminated
Kiani Smith	6	"Rhiannon"	Advanced
TJ Zimba	7	"Peaches"	Advanced

== Top 12 finalists ==
=== Dylan Wright ===
Dylan Wright, born on 22 February 1993 (age 33), is from Bangalow, New South Wales. He became the ninth winner of Australian Idol on 25 March 2024.

Audition: "Better Be Home Soon" (Crowded House)
Top 30 Part 1: "Always Remember Us This Way" (Lady Gaga)
Top 30 Part 2: "Torn" (Natalie Imbruglia)
Top 30 Part 3: "Sorrento Moon (I Remember)" (Tina Arena)
Top 21: "Walking in Memphis" (Marc Cohn)
Top 12: "I'm Gonna Be (500 Miles)" (The Proclaimers) ~ Judges’ Choice
Top 10: "Have You Ever Seen the Rain?" (Creedence Clearwater Revival) <-- song picked by Judge: Amy Shark
Top 8: "End of the Road" (Boyz II Men)
Top 8-Bottom 4: "Use Somebody" (Kings of Leon)
Top 6: "How Deep Is Your Love" (Bee Gees)
Top 6: Head-to-head: "Ordinary People" (John Legend)
Grand Finale-Top 3: "Never Tear Us Apart" (INXS)
Grand Finale-Top 3: "What About Me?" (Moving Pictures/Shannon Noll)
Grand Finale-Top 3: "Tiny Dancer" (Elton John)
Grand Finale-Top 2: "Better Be Home Soon" (Crowded House)
Grand Finale-Top 2: "Paper Heart" (winners single) - Winner

Wright's debut album Half a World Away, debuted at number 12 on the ARIA Australian Artist Chart on 4 November 2024.

=== Amy Reeves ===
Amy Reeves, born on 8 January 1999 (age 27), is from Broome, Western Australia. She finished as the runner-up on 25 March 2024.

Audition: "(You Make Me Feel Like) A Natural Woman" (Aretha Franklin)
Top 30 Part 1: "Always Remember Us This Way" (Lady Gaga)
Top 30 Part 2: "Torn" (Natalie Imbruglia)
Top 30 Part 3: "Clarity" (Zedd ft. Foxes)
Top 21: "Think" (Aretha Franklin)
Top 12: "Ain't No Other Man" (Christina Aguilera)
Top 10: "Can I Get a Moment?" (Jessica Mauboy) <-- song picked by Judge: Amy Shark ~ Judges’ Choice
Top 8: "What Was I Made For?" (Billie Eilish)
Top 6: "I'll Be There" (The Jackson 5)
Top 6: Head-to-head: "Gravity" (Sara Bareilles)
Grand Finale – Top 3: "Chains" (Tina Arena)
Grand Finale – Top 3: "Firestone" (Kygo ft. Conrad Sewell)
Grand Finale – Top 3: "Bang Bang" (Jessie J, Ariana Grande, and Nicki Minaj)
Grand Finale – Top 2: "(You Make Me Feel Like) A Natural Woman" (Aretha Franklin) – Eliminated – Runner-up

=== Denvah Baker-Moller ===
Denvah Baker-Moller, born on 5 September 2000 (age 26), is from Rockhampton, Queensland. She reached the Grand Finale on 25 March 2024, but was eliminated prior to the final round of performances.

Audition: "Pony" (Kasey Chambers)
Top 30 Part 1: "Castle on the Hill" (Ed Sheeran)
Top 30 Part 2: "Perfect" (P!nk)
Top 30 Part 3: "Yellow" (Coldplay)
Top 21: "Perfect" (Ed Sheeran)
Top 12: "9 to 5" (Dolly Parton) ~ Judges’ Choice
Top 10: "Call Me Maybe" (Carly Rae Jepsen) <-- song picked by Judge: Marcia Hines
Top 8: "God Only Knows" (The Beach Boys)
Top 8-Bottom 4: "Hold Back the River" (James Bay)
Top 6: "Girls Just Wanna Have Fun" (Cyndi Lauper)
Top 6: Head-to-head: "The Best" (Tina Turner)
Grand Finale – Top 3: "Days Go By" (Keith Urban)
Grand Finale – Top 3: "Thank God She's a Country Girl" (Morgan Evans)
Grand Finale – Top 3: "Landslide" (Fleetwood Mac) – Eliminated on 25 March

=== Trent Richardson ===
Audition: "Bless the Broken Road" (Rascal Flatts)
Top 30 Part 1: "Castle on the Hill" (Ed Sheeran)
Top 30 Part 2: "One Call Away" (Charlie Puth)
Top 30 Part 3: "Stay " (Rihanna ft. Mikky Ekko)
Top 21: "Heaven" (Bryan Adams)
Top 12: "Shut Up and Dance" (Walk the Moon)
Top 10: "3AM" (Matchbox Twenty) <-- song picked by Judge: Kyle Sandilands
Top 8: "She Looks So Perfect" (5 Seconds of Summer)
Top 6: "Home" (Michael Bublé)
Top 6: Head-to-head: "Fire and the Flood" (Vance Joy) – Eliminated on 18 March

=== Isaac McCallum ===
Audition: "Bruises" (Lewis Capaldi)
Top 30 Part 1: "Grenade" (Bruno Mars)
Top 30 Part 2: "Perfect" (P!nk)
Top 30 Part 3: "7 Years" (Lukas Graham)
Top 21: "Say You Won't Let Go" (James Arthur) ~ FastPass from Amy Shark
Top 12: "Wake Me Up" (Avicii)
Top 10: "I See Fire" (Ed Sheeran) <-- song picked by Judge: Marcia Hines
Top 8: "Wonder" (Shawn Mendes)
Top 6: "Little Bit of Love" (Tom Grennan)
Top 6: Head-to-head: "Before You Go" (Lewis Capaldi) – Eliminated on 18 March

=== Ivana Ilic ===
Audition: "If I Ain't Got You" (Alicia Keys)
Top 30 Part 1: "Addicted to You" (Avicii)
Top 30 Part 2: "Killing Me Softly with His Song" (Fugees)
Top 30 Part 3: "Came Here for Love" (Sigala ft. Ella Eyre)
Top 21: "Remember" (Becky Hill ft. David Guetta)
Top 12: "Waiting All Night" (Rudimental)
Top 12 – Bottom 2: "Where Have You Been" (Rihanna)
Top 10: "I'm Outta Love" (Anastacia) <-- song picked by Judge: Marcia Hines
Top 10 – Bottom 2: "Bleeding Love" (Leona Lewis)
Top 8: "Midnight Sky" (Miley Cyrus) ~ Judges’ Choice
Top 6: "Diamonds" (Rihanna)
Top 6: Head-to-head: "Rather Be" (Clean Bandit ft. Jess Glynne) – Eliminated on 18 March

=== Drea Onamade ===
Audition: "American Boy" (Estelle ft. Kanye West)
Top 30 Part 1: "Addicted To You" (Avicii)
Top 30 Part 2: "Circles" (Post Malone)
Top 30 Part 3: "That's What I Like" (Bruno Mars)
Top 21: "New Rules" (Dua Lipa)
Top 12: "Lil Boo Thang" (Paul Russell)
Top 10: "Battle Scars" by (Guy Sebastian ft. Lupe Fiasco) <-- song picked by Judge: Kyle Sandilands ~ Judges’ Choice
Top 8: "No Tears Left to Cry" (Ariana Grande)
Top 8 – Bottom 4: "Can't Get You Out of My Head" (Kylie Minogue) – Eliminated on 11 March

=== Kiani Smith ===
Kiani Smith, born on 3 October 2006 (age 20)

Audition: "2002" (Anne-Marie)
Top 30 Part 1: "Always Remember Us This Way" (Lady Gaga)
Top 30 Part 2: "Stand by Me" (Ben E. King)
Top 30 Part 3: "You're the One That I Want" (John Travolta & Olivia Newton-John)
Top 21: "Rhiannon" (Fleetwood Mac)
Top 12: "Cheap Thrills" (Sia)
Top 10: "Tainted Love" (Soft Cell) <-- song picked by Judge: Amy Shark
Top 10 – Bottom 2: "Riptide" (Vance Joy)
Top 8: "A Thousand Miles" (Vanessa Carlton)
Top 8 – Bottom 4: "Feeling Good" (Nina Simone) – Eliminated on 11 March

=== Tyler Hammill ===
Audition: "Lonely Boy" (The Black Keys)
Top 30 Part 1: "Castle on the Hill" (Ed Sheeran)
Top 30 Part 2: "Stand by Me" (Ben E. King)
Top 30 Part 3: "Budapest" (George Ezra)
Top 21: "Waves" (Dean Lewis) ~ FastPass from Kyle Sandilands
Top 12: "Pompeii" (Bastile)
Top 10: "Chemical" (Post Malone) <-- song picked by Judge: Kyle Sandilands
Top 10 – Bottom 2: "Let It Go" (James Bay) – Eliminated on 5 March

=== TJ Zimba ===
Audition: "Location" (Khalid)
Top 30 Part 1: "Blinding Lights" (The Weeknd)
Top 30 Part 2: "Teenage Dream" (Katy Perry)
Top 30 Part 3: "Airplanes" (B.o.B ft. Hayley Williams)
Top 21: "Peaches" (Justin Bieber ft Daniel Caesar & Giveon)
Top 12: "Party Rock Anthem" (LMFAO ft. Lauren Bennett and GoonRock)
Top 12 – Bottom 2: "bad guy" (Billie Eilish)
Top 10: "You're the Voice" (John Farnham) <-- song picked by Judge: Amy Shark
Top 10 – Bottom 2: "Hotline Bling" (Drake) – Eliminated on 5 March

=== Ripley Alexander ===
Audition: "Mamma Mia" (ABBA)
Top 30 Part 1: "Radioactive" (Imagine Dragons)
Top 30 Part 2: "One Call Away" (Charlie Puth)
Top 30 Part 3: "Heart of Glass" (Blondie)
Top 21: "Back for Good" (Take That)
Top 12: "Uptown Girl" (Billy Joel)
Top 12 – Bottom 2: "Mercy" (Shawn Mendes) – Eliminated on 27 February

=== Imogen Spendlove ===
Audition: "I Have Nothing" (Whitney Houston)
Top 30 Part 1: "Blinding Lights" (The Weeknd)
Top 30 Part 2: "Nothing Breaks Like a Heart" (Mark Ronson ft. Miley Cyrus)
Top 30 Part 3: "Against All Odds (Take a Look at Me Now)" (Phil Collins)
Top 21: "From This Moment On" (Shania Twain) ~ FastPass from Marcia Hines
Top 12: "Finally" (CeCe Peniston)
Top 12 – Bottom 2: "It's All Coming Back To Me Now" (Celine Dion) – Eliminated on 27 February

== Group/guest performances ==
Week	Performer(s)	Title
Top 12	Top 12	"Freedom! '90"
Top 12	Jessica Mauboy	"Forget You"
Top 12	The Veronicas	"Here to Dance"
Top 10	Top 10	"Straight Lines"
Top 10	Amy Shark	"Beautiful Eyes"
Top 8	Top 8	"Rush"
Top 8	Ricki-Lee Coulter	"On My Own"
Top 6	Top 6	"Giant"
Top 6	Kate Miller-Heidke	"Last Day on Earth"
Top 6	Top 6 with Royston Sagigi-Baira	"Dreaming"
Top 3	Top 12	"You Get What You Give"
Top 3	Guy Sebastian and Sam Fischer	"Antidote"
Top 3	Delta Goodrem	"Hearts On The Run"

== Weekly Song Themes ==
Date	Week	Theme
25–27 February	Top 12	Party Anthems
3–5 March	Top 10	Judges' Song Contest
10–11 March	Top 8	Public's Choice
17–18 March	Top 6	Heroes and Tributes
24–25 March	Top 3	Aussie Classics

== Live performances ==
During each round of the live performances, each contestant sings a song with a given theme. After all contestants have sung, the judges choose one contestant to directly advance to the next stage; then, the public is given approximately 24 hours to vote for their favourite singers. During the results night, after voting has closed, the four contestants with the fewest votes sing again—in pairs. The singer with the lowest number of votes, per each pair, is eliminated from the competition.

=== Top 12 (25–27 February) ===
Singer received immunity and advanced to the next stage
Singer was in the bottom two/four
Singer was eliminated

Singers Top 12 result
Singer	Order	Song	Result
Live Acts Night 1
Imogen Spendlove	1	"Finally" by CeCe Peniston	Bottom two
Isaac McCallum	2	"Wake Me Up" by Avicii	Safe
Drea Onamade	3	"Lil Boo Thang" by Paul Russell	Safe
Dylan Wright	4	"I'm Gonna Be (500 Miles)" by The Proclaimers	Judges' Vote
TJ Zimba	5	"Party Rock Anthem" by LMFAO ft. Lauren Bennett and GoonRock	Bottom two
Kiani Smith	6	"Cheap Thrills" by Sia	Safe
Live Acts Night 2
Denvah Baker-Moller	1	"9 to 5" by Dolly Parton	Judges' Vote
Amy Reeves	2	"Ain't No Other Man" by Christina Aguilera	Safe
Ripley Alexander	3	"Uptown Girl" by Billy Joel	Bottom two
Ivana Ilic	4	"Waiting All Night" by Rudimental	Bottom two
Trent Richardson	5	"Shut Up and Dance" by Walk the Moon	Safe
Tyler Hammill	6	"Pompeii" by Bastile	Safe
Songs on results night
Pair 1
Imogen Spendlove	1	"It's All Coming Back To Me Now" by Celine Dion	Eliminated
TJ Zimba	2	"bad guy" by Billie Eilish	Safe
Pair 2
Ripley Alexander	1	"Mercy" by Shawn Mendes	Eliminated
Ivana Ilic	2	"Where Have You Been" by Rihanna	Safe

=== Top 10 (3–5 March) ===
Singers Top 10 result
Singer	Order	Song	Chosen By	Result
Live Acts Night 1
Dylan Wright	1	"Have You Ever Seen the Rain?" by Creedence Clearwater Revival	Amy Shark	Safe
Drea Onamade	2	"Battle Scars" by Guy Sebastian ft. Lupe Fiasco	Kyle Sandilands	Judges' Vote
Denvah Baker-Moller	3	"Call Me Maybe" by Carly Rae Jepsen	Marcia Hines	Safe
Ivana Ilic	4	"I'm Outta Love" by Anastacia	Marcia Hines	Bottom two
TJ Zimba	5	"You're the Voice" by John Farnham	Amy Shark	Bottom two
Live Acts Night 2
Amy Reeves	1	"Can I Get a Moment?" by Jessica Mauboy	Amy Shark	Judges' Vote
Tyler Hammill	2	"Chemical" by Post Malone	Kyle Sandilands	Bottom two
Isaac McCallum	3	"I See Fire" by Ed Sheeran	Marcia Hines	Safe
Trent Richardson	4	"3AM" by Matchbox Twenty	Kyle Sandilands	Safe
Kiani Smith	5	"Tainted Love" by Soft Cell	Amy Shark	Bottom two
Songs on results night
Pair 1
Ivana Ilic	1	"Bleeding Love" by Leona Lewis		Safe
TJ Zimba	2	"Hotline Bling" by Drake		Eliminated
Pair 2
Tyler Hammill	1	"Let It Go" by James Bay		Eliminated
Kiani Smith	2	"Riptide" by Vance Joy		Safe

=== Top 8 (10–11 March) ===
Singers Top 8 result
Singer	Order	Song	Result
Ivana Ilic	1	"Midnight Sky" by Miley Cyrus	Judges' Vote
Dylan Wright	2	"End of the Road" by Boyz II Men	Bottom four
Drea Onamade	3	"No Tears Left to Cry" by Ariana Grande	Bottom four
Denvah Baker-Moller	4	"God Only Knows" by The Beach Boys	Bottom four
Isaac McCallum	5	"Wonder" by Shawn Mendes	Safe
Trent Richardson	6	"She Looks So Perfect" by 5 Seconds of Summer	Safe
Kiani Smith	7	"A Thousand Miles" by Vanessa Carlton	Bottom four
Amy Reeves	8	"What Was I Made For?" by Billie Eilish	Safe
Songs on results night
Dylan Wright	1	"Use Somebody" by Kings of Leon	Safe
Drea Onamade	2	"Can't Get You Out of My Head" by Kylie Minogue	Eliminated
Denvah Baker-Moller	3	"Hold Back the River" by James Bay	Safe
Kiani Smith	4	"Feeling Good" by Nina Simone	Eliminated

=== Top 6 (17–18 March) ===
Each contestant performed a song on live performance night. The judges opted not to put any singer directly into the Grand Finale, meaning that all results would be decided by the public vote. On results night, after voting had closed, the contestants each sang again. After each pair of contestants had sung, the results were announced for those two singers: one eliminated, and one was put through to the Grand Finale, three in total.

Singers Top 6 result
Singer	Order	Song	Song dedicated to	Result
Amy Reeves	1	"I'll Be There" by The Jackson 5	Her late father	—N/a
Denvah Baker-Moller	2	"Girls Just Wanna Have Fun" by Cyndi Lauper	Her sister, Mackenzie	—N/a
Dylan Wright	3	"How Deep Is Your Love" by Bee Gees	His family	—N/a
Trent Richardson	4	"Home" by Michael Bublé	His hometown, Emu Park	—N/a
Ivana Ilic	5	"Diamonds" by Rihanna	Sony Foundation Australia You Can Centre Youths	—N/a
Isaac McCallum	6	"Little Bit of Love" by Tom Grennan	His late grandmother, Susan	—N/a
Songs on results night
Denvah Baker-Moller	Pair 1	"The Best" by Tina Turner		Safe
Ivana Ilic	Pair 1	"Rather Be" by Clean Bandit ft. Jess Glynne		Eliminated
Isaac McCallum	Pair 2	"Before You Go" by Lewis Capaldi		Eliminated
Amy Reeves	Pair 2	"Gravity" by Sara Bareilles		Safe
Trent Richardson	Pair 3	"Fire and the Flood" by Vance Joy		Eliminated
Dylan Wright	Pair 3	"Ordinary People" by John Legend		Safe

== Grand finale performances ==
=== Grand finale (24–25 March) ===
Winner
Runner-Up
Eliminated

==== Performance night ====
Singer	Order	Australian Artists — Solo	Order	Celebrity Duet (listed in bold)	Result
Dylan Wright	1	"Never Tear Us Apart" by INXS	6	"What About Me?" by Moving Pictures (w/ **Shannon Noll**)	**Winner**
Amy Reeves	2	"Chains" by Tina Arena	4	"Firestone" by Kygo feat. **Conrad Sewell**	Runner-up
Denvah Baker-Moller	3	"Days Go By" by Keith Urban	5	"Thank God She's a Country Girl" by **Morgan Evans**	Eliminated

- Guy Sebastian filled in for Marcia Hines, who was unavailable on March 24, for health reasons.

==== Results night ====
Singer	Order	Free Choice	Order	Audition Song	Result
Denvah Baker-Moller	1	"Landslide" by Fleetwood Mac	N/A	(Already Eliminated)	Eliminated
Amy Reeves	2	"Bang Bang" by Jessie J, Ariana Grande, and Nicki Minaj	4	"(You Make Me Feel Like) A Natural Woman" by Aretha Franklin	Runner-up
Dylan Wright	3	"Tiny Dancer" by Elton John	5	"Better Be Home Soon" by Crowded House	**Winner**

- Wright performed the coronation single, "Paper Heart", upon winning.

== Elimination chart ==
Females	Males	Top 21	Top 12	Top 12 "FastPass"	Winner

Did Not Perform	Safe	Bottom 2/4	Judges’ Vote	Eliminated

Stage:		Top 21			Finals				
Week:		18/2	19/2	20/2	27/2	5/3	11/3	18/3	25/3
Place	Contestant	Result							
1	Dylan Wright	Top 12			Top 10		Bottom 4		Winner
2	Amy Reeves		Top 12			Top 8			Runner-up
3	Denvah Baker-Moller			Top 12	Top 10		Bottom 4		Eliminated
4-6	Trent Richardson		Top 12					Eliminated	
4-6	Isaac McCallum		Top 12					Eliminated	
4-6	Ivana Ilic		Top 12		Bottom 2 (26/2)	Bottom 2 (3/3)	Top 6	Eliminated	
7-8	Drea Onamade	Top 12				Top 8	Eliminated		
7-8	Kiani Smith			Top 12		Bottom 2 (4/3)	Eliminated		
9-10	Tyler Hammill			Top 12		Eliminated			
9-10	TJ Zimba			Top 12	Bottom 2 (25/2)	Eliminated			
11-12	Ripley Alexander	Top 12			Eliminated				
11-12	Imogen Spendlove	Top 12			Eliminated				
Top 21 (Part 3)	Kym Miaco			Eliminated					
Top 21 (Part 3)	Jake Carlson			Eliminated					
Top 21 (Part 3)	Olivia Britton			Eliminated					
Top 21 (Part 2)	Natasha Rose		Eliminated						
Top 21 (Part 2)	Jackson Smith		Eliminated						
Top 21 (Part 2)	Saoirse Harding		Eliminated						
Top 21 (Part 1)	Bethany Byrne	Eliminated							
Top 21 (Part 1)	Kobe White	Eliminated							
Top 21 (Part 1)	Chenai Boucher	Eliminated							

== Ratings ==
On 28 January 2024, OzTAM’s rating data recording system changed. Viewership data will now focus on National reach and National total ratings instead of the 5 metro centres and overnight shares.

Episode			Original airdate	Timeslot	National reach viewers (millions)	National total viewers (millions)	Night rank	Source
1	"Auditions"		29 January 2024	Monday 7:30 pm	1.784	0.787	5	
2	"Auditions"		30 January 2024	Tuesday 7:30 pm	1.564	0.742	5	
3	"Auditions"		31 January 2024	Wednesday 7:30 pm	1.415	0.683	6	
4	"Auditions"		4 February 2024	Sunday 7:00 pm	1.872	0.773	5	
5	"Auditions"		5 February 2024	Monday 7:30 pm	1.562	0.733	6	
6	"Auditions"		6 February 2024	Tuesday 7:30 pm	1.496	0.710	6	
7	"Auditions"		7 February 2024	Wednesday 7:30 pm	1.588	0.816	5	
8	"Top 30"		11 February 2024	Sunday 7:00 pm	1.917	0.788	3	
9	"Top 30"		12 February 2024	Monday 7:30 pm	1.693	0.834	5	
10	"Top 30"		13 February 2024	Tuesday 7:30 pm	1.427	0.752	5	
11	"Top 30"		14 February 2024	Wednesday 7:30 pm	1.582	0.849	5	
12	"Top 21"		18 February 2024	Sunday 7:00 pm	2.099	0.894	3	
13	"Top 21"		19 February 2024	Monday 7:30 pm	1.700	0.836	5	
14	"Top 21"		20 February 2024	Tuesday 7:30 pm	1.565	0.806	5	
15	"Top 12"	"Live Acts Night 1"	25 February 2024	Sunday 7:00 pm	1.942	0.874	5	
16	"Top 12"	"Live Acts Night 2"	26 February 2024	Monday 7:30 pm	1.588	0.854	5	
17	"Top 12"	"Live Results"	27 February 2024	Tuesday 7:30 pm	1.358	0.763	8	
18	"Top 10"	"Live Acts Night 1"	3 March 2024	Sunday 7:00 pm	1.765	0.950	5	
19	"Top 10"	"Live Acts Night 2"	4 March 2024	Monday 7:30 pm	1.413	0.788	5	
20	"Top 10"	"Live Results"	5 March 2024	Tuesday 7:30 pm	1.324	0.746	6	
21	"Top 8"	"Live Acts"	10 March 2024	Sunday 7:00 pm	1.808	0.839	4	
22	"Top 8"	"Live Results"	11 March 2024	Monday 7:30 pm	1.648	0.856	5	
23	"Top 6"	"Live Acts"	17 March 2024	Sunday 7:00 pm	1.861	0.862	5	
24	"Top 6"	"Live Results"	18 March 2024	Monday 7:30 pm	1.496	0.860	6	
25	"Grand Finale"	"Live Acts"	24 March 2024	Sunday 7:00 pm	1.981	0.891	4	
26	"Grand Finale"	"Live Results"	25 March 2024	Monday 7:30 pm	1.837	0.955	4	
