= Dylan Wright (singer) =

Australian singer and pianist

- Born: 22 February 1993 (age 33)
- Origin: Bangalow, New South Wales
- Genres: Country
- Occupations: Singer; songwriter; guitarist
- Instruments: Vocals; guitar
- Years active: 2014–present
- Website: www.dylanwrightmusic.com.au

Dylan Wright (born February 1993) is an Australian singer, songwriter and guitarist from Bangalow, New South Wales who won the ninth season of Australian Idol in 2024 and $100,000 in prize money. He signed with Sony Music Australia immediately after.

Wright is also one half of country duo Sons of Atticus with Matt Joyce. They released the album Jacks Motel in 2021 and the EP Cedar Creek in 2023 Sons of Atticus won a Golden Guitar at the 2026 Golden Guitar Awards.

== Early life ==
In an interview with ABC Country in September 2025, Wright said "I was always singing around the house. I picked up my first guitar when I was 10. My mum was a trained opera singer and heard me picking up some bad singing habits from artists I loved so she put me into singing lessons when I was 12. Ever since I could put singing and guitar playing together I have been writing songs as well." Wright began busking on the street at age 13 and then started playing underage at bars and pubs at age 16.

At age 16, he became the carer for his mother who died from multiple sclerosis and leukaemia when Dylan was 21 years old. Dylan told Now to Love in 2024 "It took me years to work through that part of my life... I had to grow up overnight – it was really tough."

== Career ==
=== 2014-2023: Early EPs ===
In 2014, Wright released his debut extended play (EP) The Long Way Home.

In 2021, Wright released his second EP, Times Like These.

=== 2024-present: Australian Idol and Sony Music EPs ===
In 2024, Wright auditioned for the ninth season of Seven Network's singing competition Australian Idol. Wright went with the mentality of having the world to gain and nothing to lose, later telling Country Town, "For a lot of people, it's a cop-out to appear on those shows. It's like the easy way to get your name out there. I literally wanted to go because I love learning. I love photography and videography. I wanted to see how they did their thing. I wanted to grow as a human. I didn't see it as a competition at all. If anything, it felt like a family."

Australian Idol performances and results
Round		Song	Original artist	Result
Auditions		"Better Be Home Soon	Crowded House	Through to top 30
Top 30	part 1 (group)	"Always Remember Us This Way	Lady Gaga	Advanced
Top 30	part 2 (group)	"Torn	Ednaswap	Advanced
Top 30	part 3 (solo)	"Sorrento Moon (I Remember)	Tina Arena	Through to top 21
Top 21	Free Choice	"Walking in Memphis	Marc Cohn	Through to top 12
Top 12	Party Anthems	"I'm Gonna Be (500 Miles)"	The Proclaimers	Through to top 10
Top 10	Judges' Song Contest	"Have You Ever Seen the Rain?"	Creedence Clearwater Revival	Through to top 8
Top 8	Public's Choice	"End of the Road"	Boyz II Men	Bottom 4
Top 8	Bottom 4	"Use Somebody"	Kings of Leon	Through to top 6
Top 6	Heroes and Tributes	"How Deep Is Your Love"	Bee Gees	Through to top 3
Top 6	Heroes and Tributes	"Ordinary People"	John Legend	Through to top 3
Top 3:	Aussie Classics	"Never Tear Us Apart"	INXS	Through to top 2
Top 3:	Celebrity duet	"What About Me?" (with Shannon Noll)	Moving Pictures	Through to top 2
Top 3:	Free Choice	"Tiny Dancer"	Elton John	Through to top 2
Top 2:	Audition song	"Better Be Home Soon"	Crowded House	Winner
Top 2:	Winners Song	"Paper Heart"	Dylan Wright	Winner

In March 2024, following the announcement of his win, Wright said “I auditioned for Australian Idol because I grew up loving the show. It never felt like the right time, but all of a sudden, the stars have aligned. I hope to be one of the most successful Australian Idol contestants and to make my family proud. My dream is to write and perform music full time." Following his Idol appearance, Wright signed with Sony Music Australia. In April 2024, Wright performed in fundraisers for the Good Friday Appeal.

In September 2024, Wright released "Little Lost", the lead single from the EP Half the World Away released on 25 October 2024. The title refers to the isolation he felt from his loved ones after winning Australian Idol. The EP was released in two lots of three tracks.

The EP debuted at number 12 on the ARIA Australian Artist Chart on 4 November 2024. In December 2024, Wright performed at Carols by Candlelight.

Wright was nominated for New Talent of the Year at the 2025 Country Music Awards of Australia.

In early 2025, Wright joined Tina Arena on her encore Don't Ask… Again tour

In July 2026, Wright is scheduled to release Crossroads.

== Personal life ==
Wright is the father of two girls, Piper (c.2020) and Rivi (c.2023).

In December 2025, Wright was baptised and confessed on Instagram that it was something that he wanted to do for a while.

== Discography ==
=== Extended plays ===
Title	Details	Peak chart positions
Title	Details	AUS
The Long Way Home	Released: November 2014; Label: Dylan Wright	—
Times Like These	Released: July 2021; Label: Interface	—
Half the World Away	Released: 25 October 2024; Label: Sony Music Australia	— (Note: Half the World Away did not enter the ARIA Albums Chart top 50, but peaked at number 12 on the ARIA Australian Artists Albums Chart.)
Crossroads	Released: 10 July 2026; Label: Sony Music Australia	33

== Awards and nominations ==
=== ARIA Music Awards ===
The ARIA Music Awards is an annual awards ceremony that recognises excellence, innovation, and achievement across all genres of Australian music.

Year	Nominee / work	Award	Result	Ref.
2025	Half the World Away	Best Country Album	Nominated	

=== Country Music Awards of Australia ===
The Country Music Awards of Australia (CMAA) (also known as the Golden Guitar Awards) is an annual awards night held in January during the Tamworth Country Music Festival, in Tamworth, New South Wales, celebrating recording excellence in the Australian country music industry.

Year	Nominee / work	Award	Result	Ref.
2025	Dylan Wright	New Talent of the Year	Nominated	
2026	Born to Roam by Sons of Atticus (Dylan Wright and Matt Joyce)	Bluegrass Recording of the Year	Won	

== Notes ==
Preceded by Royston Sagigi-Baira	Australian Idol; Winner; Season 9 (2024)	Succeeded by Marshall Hamburger
