= Kaitlyn Thomas =

Australian country music singer-songwriter

- Origin: Wallan, Victoria, Australia
- Genres: Country, Country Rock
- Occupation: Singer-songwriter
- Instruments: Vocals, guitar
- Years active: 2012–present
- Website: www.kaitlynthomasofficial.com

Kaitlyn Thomas is an Australian country music singer-songwriter. She first gained recognition through youth songwriting competitions organised by the Australian Songwriters Association, before graduating from the CMAA Academy of Country Music and releasing her own music. She appeared on the 2023 season of the television singing competition Australian Idol.

== Early life and career development ==
Thomas grew up with her family in rural Victoria and began writing songs at the age of eight. In 2011 she was part of Opera Australia’s production of La bohème and represented Australia at the World Championships of Performing Arts and was awarded medals for her singing, dancing and acting.

She received early recognition through youth songwriting competitions. Thomas won the Australian Songwriters Association (ASA) Youth Category in 2013 for her song "Believe In You".

Music Matters reported that Thomas also received Australian Children's Songwriter awards in 2012 and 2014 in her age division, and that "Believe In You" was featured on the debut Music Matters Charity Album.

Thomas has spoken about her own experiences with bullying; she was bullied for her interest in music, and songwriting became her outlet. "Music was a blessing and a curse when I was younger", she said. Her early songwriting included "Stand Up", a song she wrote in 2012 to address bullying experiences. Thomas has supported anti-bullying initiatives in her role as an ambassador for Bully Zero Australia since 2016; the organisation lists her among its ambassadors.

In 2016, Thomas performed at two noted Nashville venues, the Bluebird Café and Honky Tonk Central.

Thomas later won the Australian Songwriters Association Youth Category again in 2018.

Thomas graduated from both the Junior and Senior CMAA Academy of Country Music.

In 2021, Countrytown premiered Thomas's single "Make Your Move", covering the release as part of its reporting on Australian country music.

== Australian Idol ==
In 2023, Thomas appeared as a contestant in the Australian television singing competition Australian Idol season 8 on Channel Seven. Her song choice in the 31 January Auditions was "Redneck Woman" by Gretchen Wilson. She progressed through the audition stages and was included among the program's Top 50 contestants. She received four yeses from judges Meghan Trainor, Amy Shark, Harry Connick Jr. and Kyle Sandilands. She was eliminated before reaching the Top 24 stage of the competition.

Following her appearance on the program, the North Central Review stated "anyone who knew Ms Thomas was already sure – Australian Idol was only the beginning for the country songstress".

== Recent releases and festival appearances ==
Following her appearance on Australian Idol, Thomas released her single "Pretty Little Thing" in 2023. Countrytown, which hosted the video premiere, described her sound as blending elements of country, rock, and pop and said she "empowers women everywhere with her barnstorming new single". The North Central Review said the song, co-written with Michael Paynter and Michael Delorenzis of MSquared, "might be her best track yet" and reported that the video was shot at Kilmore Trackside, with local crowd participation.

In 2023, Thomas was announced as a supporting performer for Vika and Linda Bull at a flood recovery benefit concert in Seymour, Victoria.

In 2024, Kaitlyn Thomas appeared as a guest performer at "Girls Night Out", a show hosted by Jayne Denham on the Toyota Park stage during the Tamworth Country Music Festival. The performance was streamed through the festival's official website and social media platforms, with the show also featuring appearances from artists Amber Lawrence, Hurricane Fall, Jamie Lindsay and Ella & Sienna. In July, Thomas released "Hell Of A Long Time", which was premiered by Countrytown. The publication noted the song followed her performances at Australian country music events and highlighted her participation in the 2024 Gympie Music Muster Talent Search.

In 2025, Thomas released "Mississippi Lies", which received a video premiere from Countrytown. Countrytown described her sound as "a signature blend of emotional storytelling, strong vocal delivery, and an unapologetic edge that sets her apart on the country music scene." The song was also featured in the July 2026 episode of ABC Country's Grass Roots.

Thomas has performed at Australian country music festivals including the Tamworth Country Music Festival, Groundwater Country Music Festival the Road to Roma Festival, and the Whittlesea Country Music Festival, and was included in the line-up for the inaugural Paradise Country festival in 2026.

In 2026, Thomas released the single "Truckin' Country". Around the time of its release, ZFM Country reported that she had recently supported Amber Lawrence, Brooke McClymont and Adam Eckersley, with further festival appearances scheduled during 2026.

== Industry recognition and competitions ==
In 2025, Thomas, based in Rifle Range, Queensland, was selected as one of the Top 10 finalists in the 45th Toyota Star Maker. Since its inception, the competition has selected over 500 Australian artists to perform in its finals. Alumni include Keith Urban, Lee Kernaghan, Beccy Cole, Max Jackson and James Blundell.

Thomas was selected as one of 12 finalists in the Open Category of the 2025 Gympie Music Muster Talent Search.

In November 2026, it was announced that Kaitlyn Thomas was one of the top ten finalists for Toyota Star Maker 2027.

== Discography ==
=== Singles ===
- "First Kiss"
- "Make Your Move" (2021)
- "Damn You" (2023)
- "Pretty Little Thing" (2023)
- "Hell Of A Long Time" (2024)
- "Mississippi Lies" (2025)
- "Truckin' Country" (2026)
