= Australian Idol season 8 =

Season of television series

Australian Idol
- Season 8
- Hosted by: Ricki-Lee Coulter; Scott Tweedie
- Judges: Harry Connick Jr. Kyle Sandilands; Amy Shark; Meghan Trainor; Marcia Hines (Top 50 Only)
- Winner: Royston Sagigi-Baira
- Runner-up: Phoebe Stewart
- Finals venue: Sydney Coliseum Theatre

Release
- Original network: Seven Network
- Original release: 30 January – 26 March 2023

Season chronology
- ← Previous; Season 7 Next → Season 9

- Australian Idol (season 8)
- Finalists (with dates of elimination)
Royston Sagigi-Baira	Winner
Phoebe Stewart	Runner-up
Josh Hannan	26 March
Amali Dimond	20 March
Ben Sheehy	20 March
Anya Hynninen	20 March
Angelina Curtis	13 March
Noora H	13 March
Sash Seabourne	6 March
Harry Hayden	6 March
Maya Weiss	27 February
Jasey Fox	27 February

The eighth season of Australian Idol premiered on 30 January 2023. It is the show's first season since 2009. It aired on Seven Network, after the network bought the rights to the series from Network 10. The grand final was won by Royston Sagigi-Baira, also known as Royston Noell, whose winner's single, "Invincible", was released after the grand final on 26 March 2023.

== Production ==
On 21 October 2020, Seven Network announced at their annual upfronts that they will be reviving the series, originally slated for 2022. It was later delayed until 2023.

Ricki-Lee Coulter and Scott Tweedie are the hosts, with the judging panel consisting of former American Idol judge Harry Connick Jr., former Australian Idol judge Kyle Sandilands, Amy Shark and Meghan Trainor. Original judge Marcia Hines appeared as a guest judge.

The series is produced by Eureka Productions.

== Auditions ==
Auditions were held in various cities around Australia. If an auditionee received a "yes" vote from at least three of the four judges, they received a "golden ticket", which put them into the top 50. In a few cases, a single judge visited a remote location, and auditionees were accepted or rejected for the top 50 by that judge alone.

Singer did not receive a golden ticket

=== Auditions 1 (30 January) ===
Singers that received a golden ticket
Singer	Age	Hometown	Song
Amali Dimond	16	Shellharbour, New South Wales	"Make You Feel My Love" by Adele
Aaliyah Bise	20	Ballarat, Victoria	"Only Love Can Hurt Like This" by Paloma Faith
Kimberley Lyons	24	Brisbane, Queensland	"Good Riddance (Time of Your Life)" by Green Day
Storm Klarich	27	Adelaide, South Australia	"Breakeven" by The Script
Sharin Attamimi	24	Perth, Western Australia	"Leave the Door Open" by Silk Sonic
Nicholas Joy	23	Brisbane, Queensland	"Don't Stop Me Now" by Queen
Josh Hannan	20	Mount Evelyn, Victoria	"Brother" by Matt Corby
Imogen Ledell	19	Sydney, New South Wales	"Lay Me Down" by Sam Smith
Connor Bulger	19	Bendigo, Victoria	"A Pub with No Beer" by Slim Dusty
Jono Webb	26	Adelaide, South Australia	"Never Enough" by Loren Allred
Elaina O'Connor	22	Perth, Western Australia	"All by Myself" by Celine Dion
Naomi Gipey	22	Alice Springs, Northern Territory	"Mercy" by Duffy
Ellen Bolger-Rowe	28	Bathurst, New South Wales	"Good as Hell" by Lizzo
Kaitlyn Smith	21	Melbourne, Victoria	"Just Give Me a Reason" by Pink
Ben Sheehy	24	Brisbane, Queensland	"Whole Lotta Love" by Led Zeppelin
Sara Houston	26	Perth, Western Australia	"Waiting on the World to Change" by John Mayer

=== Auditions 2 (31 January) ===
Singers that received a golden ticket
Singer	Age	Hometown	Song Choice
Angelina Curtis	15	Perth, Western Australia	"Message to My Girl" by Split Enz
Ruby Wall	16	Logan, Queensland	"Don't Rain on My Parade" by Barbra Streisand
Drew Tisdell	21	Braidwood, New South Wales	"Return to Sender" by Elvis Presley
Amshalaykha Yogaraj	23	Perth, Western Australia	"Nobody's Perfect" by Jessie J
Royston Sagigi-Baira	23	Mapoon, Queensland	"I’m Not the Only One" by Sam Smith
Angus Holmes*	21	Gold Coast, Queensland	"April Sun in Cuba" by Dragon
Bobby Holmes*	17	Gold Coast, Queensland	"Love Really Hurts Without You" by Billy Ocean
Holmes Brothers*		Gold Coast, Queensland	"Any Way You Want It" by Journey
Chenai Boucher	25	Melbourne, Victoria	"My Immortal" by Evanescence
Piper Butcher	18	Newcastle, New South Wales	"Radioactive" by Imagine Dragons
Ali Morriss	27	Brisbane, Queensland	"Untouched" by The Veronicas
Maya Weiss	28	Victoria	"Wings" by Little Mix
Charlie Check	18	Sydney, New South Wales	"Come Fly With Me" by Frank Sinatra
Victoria Kakoulis	25	Adelaide, South Australia	"Ave Maria" by Schubert
Jared Markham	27	Perth, Western Australia	"Johnny B. Goode" by Chuck Berry
Yasmin and Yolanda Absolom	24	Melbourne, Victoria	"Bad Romance" by Lady Gaga
Kaitlyn Thomas	22	Wallan, Victoria	"Redneck Woman" by Gretchen Wilson
Taigh Wade	21	Perth, Western Australia	"Dancing On My Own" by Calum Scott

- Angus and Bobby Holmes are brothers who both performed separately, however when it was found out they were brothers they auditioned together and both received golden tickets.

=== Auditions 3 (1 February) ===
Singers that received a golden ticket
Singer	Age	Hometown	Song Choice
Amelie Matthews	15	Sydney, New South Wales	"Idontwannabeyouanymore" by Billie Eilish
Sash Seabourne	25	Margaret River, Western Australia	"I Wanna Dance with Somebody" by Whitney Houston
Noah Cookson	19	Mackay, Queensland	"Yellow" by Coldplay
Susana Downes	28	Sydney, New South Wales	"Defying Gravity" by Idina Menzel
Nasim Jamal	28	Melbourne, Victoria	Original Rap
Franky Drousioti	24	Melbourne, Victoria	"The Prayer" by Andrea Bocelli
Kristina Bilandzic	22	Sydney, New South Wales	"Dynamite" by BTS
Jasey Fox	26	Central Coast, New South Wales	"Bohemian Rhapsody" by Queen
Michaela George	26	Bundaberg, Queensland	"Sorry Not Sorry" by Demi Lovato
Isabella Vicente	25	Darwin, Northern Territory	"Wicked Game" by Chris Isaak
Jessica Crossman	25	Kiama, New South Wales	"You’ve Got the Love" by Florence + The Machine
Jordan Cheney	26	Melbourne, Victoria	"Never Tear Us Apart" by INXS
Hamani Tanginoa	21	Sydney, New South Wales	"My Island Home" by Christine Anu
Jeremy Fletcher	19	Mareeba, Queensland	"Solid Rock" by Goanna
Noora H	27	Sydney, New South Wales	"She Wolf" by Sia

=== Auditions 4 (5 February) ===
Singers that received a golden ticket
Singer	Age	Hometown	Song Choice
Alivia Hollis	18	Brisbane, Queensland	"Piece by Piece" by Kelly Clarkson
Kartik Kunasegaran	27	Sydney, New South Wales	"Treasure" by Bruno Mars
Anastasia Skourtis	22	Adelaide, South Australia	"Thriller" by Michael Jackson
Tessa Noll	24	Condobolin, New South Wales	"Like I'm Gonna Lose You" by Meghan Trainor
Tom Nethersole	18	Ardmona, Victoria	"Too Good at Goodbyes" by Sam Smith
Deon Mai	22	Adelaide, South Australia	"I'm Not the Only One" by Sam Smith
Grace Blakiston	22	Perth, Western Australia	"Never Enough" by Loren Allred
Montana Lara	24	Brisbane, Queensland	"Chains" by Tina Arena
Haze Harrington*	25	Brisbane, Queensland	"Iris" by Goo Goo Dolls
Haze Harrington*	25	Brisbane, Queensland	"Falling" by Harry Styles
James Vawser	28	Adelaide, South Australia	"You Give Me Something" by James Morrison
Jada Kyle	23	Melbourne, Victoria	"I'm Not the Only One" by Sam Smith
Sam Jeacle	25	Canberra, Australian Capital Territory	"Rebel Yell" by Billy Idol
Damien Agius	27	Eton, Queensland	"If Tomorrow Never Comes" by Garth Brooks
Hayden Lunn	20	Brisbane, Queensland	"Somebody to Love" by Queen
Laura Byrnes	28	Perth, Western Australia	"My Happy Ending" by Avril Lavigne
Josh Anderson	28	Sunshine Coast, Queensland	"Psycho Killer" by Talking Heads
Chandler Campbell	19	Gold Coast, Queensland	"Let's Face the Music and Dance" by Seth MacFarlane
Emilie Sutter	17	Adelaide, South Australia	"Not Pretty Enough" by Kasey Chambers

- Haze Harrington auditioned twice, in two different cities.

=== Auditions 5 (6 February) ===
Singers that received a golden ticket
Singer	Age	Hometown	Song Choice
Bec Voysey	24	Perth, Western Australia	"Skinny Love" by Bon Iver
Harry Hayden	18	Melbourne, Victoria	"I Am Changing" by Jennifer Hudson
Keziel MacGregor	27	Geelong, Victoria	"Kiss Me" by Sixpence None the Richer
Kaiyai Doenau	28	Coffs Harbour, New South Wales	"Never Tear Us Apart" by INXS
Nicholas Meyers	28	Melbourne, Victoria	"Bye Bye Bye" by NSYNC
Anya Hynninen	19	Selby, Victoria	"Ring Of Fire" by Johnny Cash
Dylan Sutton	29	Canberra, Australian Capital Territory	"Grace Kelly" by Mika
Gemma Ann Rourke	25	Mornington Peninsula, Victoria	"Locked Out of Heaven" by Bruno Mars
Billy Dyer	21	Gold Coast, Queensland	"Wake Me Up" by Avicii
Hamish Guiana	18	Scone, New South Wales	"This Town" by Niall Horan
Tilly Weaver	20	Melbourne, Victoria	"All About That Bass" by Meghan Trainor
Tia Jones	18	Townsville, Queensland	"Lips Are Movin" by Meghan Trainor
Sheridan Hames	28	Adelaide, South Australia	"Bad for Me" by Meghan Trainor
Elizabeth Pardallis	18	Melbourne, Victoria	"Something's Got a Hold on Me" by Etta James
Ethan Hill	19	Ipswich, Queensland	"In The Stars" by Benson Boone
Tully Wishart	25	Melbourne, Victoria	"Lonely Boy" by The Black Keys
Dubai Fabian	17	Gold Coast, Queensland	"I Said Hi" by Amy Shark
Peter Karagounis	21	Melbourne, Victoria	"Almost Is Never Enough" by Ariana Grande and Nathan Sykes
Jakob Poyner	18	Narooma, New South Wales	"Broken Cowboy" by The Dead South

- Jakob Poyner was originally rejected at first, until Meghan changed her mind.
- Elizabeth Pardallis and Ethan Hill auditions were compiled.

=== Auditions 6 (7 February) ===
Singers that received a golden ticket
Singer	Age	Hometown	Song Choice
Jessica Clennett	25	Hobart, Tasmania	"Whole Lotta Love" by Led Zeppelin
Fenn Idle	27	Sydney, New South Wales	Original Song
Alkira Odell	26	Blue Mountains, New South Wales	"Memory" by Barbra Streisand
Yasmin and Yolanda Absolom*	24	Melbourne, Victoria	"Bad Romance" by Lady Gaga
Elysa Villareal	24	Sydney, New South Wales	"24K Magic" by Bruno Mars
Sharni Stewart	28	Adelaide, South Australia	"Always Remember Us This Way" by Lady Gaga
Triston Joynt	20	Rockingham, Western Australia	"Ordinary People" by John Legend
Ethan Moon	20	Brisbane, Queensland	"Half a Man" by Dean Lewis
Jenaya Laidler	15	Alice Springs, Northern Territory	"Travelin' Soldier" by Dixie Chicks
Paityn Laidler	17	Alice Springs, Northern Territory	"What About Us" by Pink
Kristie Roberts	28	Gold Coast, Queensland	"I’m Outta Love" by Anastasia
Erica Padilla		Melbourne, Victoria	"River" by Bishop Briggs
Finn Burton	21	Canberra, Australian Capital Territory	"Teenage Dirtbag" by Wheatus
Isha Ramji		Melbourne, Victoria	"Diamonds" by Rihanna
Mark Balas	23	Melbourne, Victoria	"Time After Time" by Cyndi Lauper
Lachlan Izzard	19	Sydney, New South Wales	"You Are the Reason" by Calum Scott

- Yasmin and Yolanda Absolom audition was shown again.

=== Auditions 7 (12 February) ===
Singers that received a golden ticket
Singer	Age	Hometown	Song Choice
Phoebe Stewart	15	Busselton, Western Australia	"One and Only" by Adele
Cooper Turnbull	18	Sydney, New South Wales	"Fallin’" by Harry Styles
Spencer Turnbull	20	Sydney, New South Wales	"Sway" by Michael Bublé
Jasmine Vanua	18	Adelaide, South Australia	"And I am Telling You" by Jennifer Hudson
Sophie Booth	25	Central Coast, New South Wales	"Brave" by Sara Bareilles
Natalie Poole	23	Central Coast, New South Wales	"I Dreamed a Dream" by Les Misérables
Liam Brown	22	Melbourne, Victoria	"I Want to Break Free" by Queen
Layla Rose Schillert	16	Newcastle, New South Wales	"The Climb" by Miley Cyrus
Charlotte McKie	19	Newcastle, New South Wales	"Lay Me Down" by Sam Smith
Mariah Keramianaki	25	Crookwell, New South Wales	"Proud Mary" by Creedence Clearwater Revival
Harry Carman	26	Canberra, Australian Capital Territory	"I Don't Want to Be" by Gavin Degraw
Mitchell Cocchiara	21	Melbourne, Victoria	"Use Somebody" by Kings of Leon
Josh Glennon	28	Bowral, New South Wales	"Take It Easy" by Eagles
Aria North	24	Old Bar, New South Wales	"Party in the U.S.A." by Miley Cyrus
Britney Renae	21	Adelaide, South Australia	"Never Enough" by Loren Allred
Sarah Robinson	28	Perth, Western Australia	"Dear Future Husband" by Meghan Trainor
Tahlia Eve Pizzicara	21	Melbourne, Victoria	"One Last Time" by Ariana Grande
Lucy Smith	19	Bunbury, Western Australia	"Pleasure and Pain" by Divinyls

== Top 50 ==
Marcia Hines, who was a judge for all of the seven seasons of Australian Idol's original run, filled in for Meghan Trainor during the Top 50 rounds.

=== Top 50 Part 1 (13 February) ===
Singers did not make it

Singers Top 50 result
Round 1 – Chorus Line
Group	Song	Singer	Result
Group 1	"Wrecking Ball"	Amali Dimond	Advanced
Group 1	"Wrecking Ball"	Finn Burton	Eliminated
Group 1	"Wrecking Ball"	Ben Sheehy	Advanced
Group 1	"Wrecking Ball"	Emilie Sutter	Advanced
Group 1	"Wrecking Ball"	Royston Sagigi-Baira	Advanced
Group 1	"Wrecking Ball"	Jasey Fox	Advanced
Group 2	"Landslide"	Sara Houston	Advanced
Group 2	"Landslide"	Edwin Fejo	Advanced
Group 2	"Landslide"	Josh Hannan	Advanced
Group 2	"Landslide"	Isabella Vicente	Advanced
Group 2	"Landslide"	Sash Seabourne	Advanced
Group 3	"Wake Me Up"	Bobby Holmes	Advanced
Group 3	"Wake Me Up"	Angus Holmes	Advanced
Group 3	"Wake Me Up"	Damien Agius	Advanced
Group 3	"Wake Me Up"	Connor Bulger	Advanced
Group 3	"Wake Me Up"	Kartik Kunasegaran	Advanced
Group 4	"Dangerous Woman"	Noora H	Advanced
Group 4	"Dangerous Woman"	Sharin Attamimi	Advanced
Group 4	"Dangerous Woman"	Maya Weis	Advanced
Group 4	"Dangerous Woman"	Isha Ramji	Advanced
Group 5	"Stitches"	Sam Jeacle	Advanced
Group 5	"Stitches"	Triston Joynt	Advanced
Group 5	"Stitches"	Chandler Campbell	Eliminated
Group 5	"Stitches"	Tully Wishart	Advanced
Group 6	"Higher Love"	Maddison Smith	Eliminated
Group 6	"Higher Love"	Montana Lara	Advanced
Group 6	"Higher Love"	Mariah Keramianaki	Eliminated
Group 6	"Higher Love"	Michaela George	Eliminated
Group 6	"Higher Love"	Naomi Gipey	Advanced
Group 6	"Higher Love"	Tahlia Eve Pizzicara	Advanced
Group 6	"Higher Love"	Bec Voysey	Advanced
Group 7	"Try"	Jessica Clennett	Advanced
Group 7	"Try"	Angelina Curtis	Advanced
Group 7	"Try"	Kristie Roberts	Advanced
Group 7	"Try"	Kaitlyn Thomas	Advanced
Group 7	"Try"	Gemma Ann Rourke	Eliminated
Group 8	"Someone You Loved"	Cooper Turnbull	Advanced
Group 8	"Someone You Loved"	Spencer Turnbull	Eliminated
Group 8	"Someone You Loved"	Lachlan Izzard	Eliminated
Group 8	"Someone You Loved"	Harry Hayden	Advanced
Group 8	"Someone You Loved"	Noah Cookson	Advanced
Group 8	"Someone You Loved"	Charlie Check	Eliminated
Group 8	"Someone You Loved"	Peter Karagounis	Advanced
Group 8	"Someone You Loved"	James Vawser	Advanced
Round 2 – Group Challenge
Group	Song	Singer	Result
Group 1 (Go Rogue)	"Roar"	Sam Jeacle	Eliminated
Group 1 (Go Rogue)	"Roar"	Jessica Clennett	Eliminated
Group 1 (Go Rogue)	"Roar"	Ben Sheehy	Advanced
Group 1 (Go Rogue)	"Roar"	Angus Holmes	Eliminated
Group 1 (Go Rogue)	"Roar"	Kristie Roberts	Advanced
Group 2 (Team Honey)	"Time After Time"	Amali Dimond	Advanced
Group 2 (Team Honey)	"Time After Time"	Sash Seabourne	Advanced
Group 2 (Team Honey)	"Time After Time"	Jasey Fox	Advanced
Group 2 (Team Honey)	"Time After Time"	Piper Butcher	Advanced
Group 2 (Team Honey)	"Time After Time"	Angelina Curtis	Advanced
Group 3 (TRAK'N)	"Can't Stop the Feeling!"	Noah Cookson	Advanced
Group 3 (TRAK'N)	"Can't Stop the Feeling!"	Bec Voysey	Advanced
Group 3 (TRAK'N)	"Can't Stop the Feeling!"	Anya Hynninen	Advanced
Group 3 (TRAK'N)	"Can't Stop the Feeling!"	Tahlia Eve Pizzicara	Advanced
Group 3 (TRAK'N)	"Can't Stop the Feeling!"	Kartik Kunasegaran	Advanced
Group 4 (Existence)	"Perfect"	Cooper Turnbull	Advanced
Group 4 (Existence)	"Perfect"	James Vawser	Advanced
Group 4 (Existence)	"Perfect"	Bobby Holmes	Advanced
Group 4 (Existence)	"Perfect"	Josh Hannan	Advanced
Group 4 (Existence)	"Perfect"	Tully Wishart	Advanced
Group 5 (Smalltown)	"Down Under"	Emilie Sutter	Eliminated
Group 5 (Smalltown)	"Down Under"	Damien Agius	Advanced
Group 5 (Smalltown)	"Down Under"	Isabella Vicente	Eliminated
Group 5 (Smalltown)	"Down Under"	Connor Bulger	Advanced
Group 5 (Smalltown)	"Down Under"	Kaitlyn Thomas	Advanced
Group 6 (Fierce Five)	"Just the Way You Are"	Edwin Fejo	Advanced
Group 6 (Fierce Five)	"Just the Way You Are"	Noora H	Advanced
Group 6 (Fierce Five)	"Just the Way You Are"	Isha Ramji	Eliminated
Group 6 (Fierce Five)	"Just the Way You Are"	Sara Houston	Advanced
Group 6 (Fierce Five)	"Just the Way You Are"	Harry Hayden	Advanced
Group 7 (Five Rings)	"Head & Heart"	Peter Karagounis	Advanced
Group 7 (Five Rings)	"Head & Heart"	Naomi Gipey	Advanced
Group 7 (Five Rings)	"Head & Heart"	Triston Joynt	Advanced
Group 7 (Five Rings)	"Head & Heart"	Taigh Wade	Eliminated
Group 7 (Five Rings)	"Head & Heart"	Alivia Hollis	Eliminated
Group 8	"I'll Be There"	Montana Lara	Advanced
Group 8	"I'll Be There"	Phoebe Stewart	Advanced
Group 8	"I'll Be There"	Sharin Attamimi	Advanced
Group 8	"I'll Be There"	Royston Sagigi-Baira	Advanced
Group 8	"I'll Be There"	Maya Weis	Advanced

=== Top 50 Part 2 (14 February) ===
32 contestants reached this round. Each contestant sang a song solo in front of a live audience. The judges then decided who would progress to the final 24.

Solo Round result
Singer	Order	Song	Result
Naomi Gipey	1	"Ex's & Oh's"	Advanced
Phoebe Stewart	2	"Lose You to Love Me"	Advanced
Angelina Curtis	3	"Strong"	Advanced
Harry Hayden	4	"You Know I'm No Good"	Advanced
Jasey Fox	5	"Does Your Mother Know"	Advanced
Royston Sagigi-Baira	6	"Everything I Wanted"	Advanced
Anya Hynninen	7	"I Was Made for Lovin' You"	Advanced
Ben Sheehy	8	"Fortunate Son"	Advanced
Kaitlyn Thomas	9	"Man! I Feel Like a Woman!"	Eliminated
Triston Joynt	10	"Love on the Brain"	Eliminated
Edwin Fejo	11	"All by Myself"	Eliminated
Amali Dimond	12	"Before You Go"	Advanced
Cooper Turnbull	13	"All I Want"	Advanced
Sharin Attamimi	14	"Rise Up"	Advanced
Montana Lara	15	"Elastic Heart"	Eliminated
Tully Wishart	16	"Blame It on Me"	Eliminated
Bobby Holmes	17	"I Want It That Way"	Advanced
Noah Cookson	18	"Forever Young"	Advanced
Sash Seabourne	19	"Finally"	Advanced
Piper Butcher	20	"Complicated"	Advanced
Kartik Kunasegaran	21	"So Sick"	Eliminated
Josh Hannan	22	"It'll Be Okay"	Advanced
Sara Houston	23	"Cloudy Day"	Advanced
James Vawser	24	"Breakeven"	Advanced
Peter Karagounis	25	"I Love You"	Advanced
Damien Agius	26	"Bad Moon Rising"	Advanced
Connor Bulger	27	"Boys from the Bush"	Eliminated
Noora H	28	"Stay"	Advanced
Kristie Roberts	29	"What About Us"	Advanced
Bec Voysey	30	"When the Party's Over"	Advanced
Maya Weis	31	"Ain't Nobody"	Advanced
Tahlia Eve Pizzicara	32	"Ain't Nobody"	Eliminated

== Top 24 ==
The Top 24 was divided into three rounds, with eight singers performing in each round, and four singers from each round progressing to the Top 12. A judge could put a singer through to the Top 12 by awarding a "touchdown", with each judge allowed to award one "touchdown" across the three rounds. The other singers that progressed to the Top 12 were announced by the judges at the end of each round.

Singer received a "Touchdown" and advanced to the Top 12
Singer did not make the Top 12

=== Top 24 Part 1 (19 February) ===
Singers Top 24 result
Singer	Order	Song	Result
Amali Dimond	1	"Unstoppable"	Advanced
Royston Sagigi-Baira	2	"Versace on the Floor"	Advanced
Noah Cookson	3	"Blinding Lights"	Eliminated
Anya Hynninen	4	"The Best"	Advanced ("Touchdown" given by Amy)
Ben Sheehy	5	"Immigrant Song"	Advanced
Piper Butcher	6	"Like a Prayer"	Eliminated
James Vawser	7	"20 Good Reasons"	Eliminated
Bec Voysey	8	"A Sky Full of Stars"	Eliminated

=== Top 24 Part 2 (20 February) ===
Singers Top 24 result
Singer	Order	Song	Result
Sash Seabourne	1	"Sex on Fire"	Advanced
Maya Weiss	2	"Addicted to You"	Advanced ("Touchdown" given by Kyle)
Naomi Gipey	3	"Bleeding Love"	Elimimated
Cooper Turnbull	4	"Hallelujah"	Eliminated
Phoebe Stewart	5	"You Got the Love"	Advanced ("Touchdown" given by Meghan)
Harry Hayden	6	"Take Me to Church"	Advanced
Damien Agius	7	"Amazed"	Eliminated
Kristie Baillie	8	"Respect"	Eliminated

=== Top 24 Part 3 (21 February) ===
Singers Top 24 result
Singer	Order	Song	Result
Sharin Attamimi	1	"I Will Survive"	Eliminated
Josh Hannan	2	"Glimpse of Us"	Advanced
Jasey Fox	3	"Grace Kelly"	Advanced
Noora H	4	"Hopelessly Devoted to You"	Advanced
Bobby Holmes	5	"Locked Out of Heaven"	Eliminated
Angelina Curtis	6	"The Only Exception"	Advanced ("Touchdown" given by Harry)
Peter Karagounis	7	"Diamonds"	Eliminated
Sara Houston	8	"I'm Like a Bird"	Eliminated

== Weekly song themes ==
Date	Week	Theme
26–27 February	Top 12	Global Number One Hits
5–6 March	Top 10	Judges' Song Contest
12–13 March	Top 8	Heroes & Tributes
19–20 March	Top 6	Viewers’ Choice

== Group/guest performances ==
Week	Performer(s)	Title
Top 12	Top 12	"About Damn Time"
Top 12	Meghan Trainor	"Made You Look"
Top 10	Top 10	"Believer"
Top 10	Adam Lambert	"Holding Out for a Hero"
Top 8	Top 8	"Don't Dream It's Over"
Top 8	OneRepublic	"I Ain't Worried"
Top 6	Top 6	"I'll Be There"
Top 6	Top 6	"I'm Good (Blue)"
Top 6	Sam Fischer and Amy Shark	"High on You"

== Top 12 finalists ==
=== Royston Sagigi-Baira ===
Audition: "I’m Not the Only One" (Sam Smith)
Top 50 Part 1-Round 1: "Wrecking Ball" (Miley Cyrus)
Top 50 Part 1-Round 2: "I'll Be There" (Jess Glynne)
Top 50 Part 2: "Everything I Wanted" (Billie Eilish)
Top 24: "Versace on the Floor" (Bruno Mars)
Top 12: "Man In The Mirror" (Michael Jackson)
Top 10: "I Won't Let You Go" (James Morrison) <-- song picked by Judge: Amy Shark
Top 8: "The Climb" (Miley Cyrus)
Top 6: "True Colors" (Cyndi Lauper)
Top 6: Head-to-head: "I Want to Know What Love Is" (Foreigner)
Grand Finale – Top 3: "I Can't Make You Love Me" (Bonnie Raitt)
Grand Finale –Top 2: "When You Believe" (Whitney Houston)
Grand Finale – Top 2: "Invincible" (winners single) – Winner

=== Phoebe Stewart ===
Audition: "One and Only" (Adele)
Top 50 Part 1 – Round 1: Landslide (Fleetwood Mac)
Top 50 Part 1 – Round 2: "I'll Be There" (Jess Glynne)
Top 50 Part 2: "Lose You to Love Me" (Selena Gomez)
Top 24: "You Got the Love" (Florence and the Machine) ~ TOUCHDOWN!
Top 12: "Beneath Your Beautiful" (Labrinth ft. Emeli Sandé) ~ Judges’ Choice
Top 10: "Dancing Queen" (ABBA) <-- song picked by Judge: Meghan Trainor
Top 8: "You Say" (Lauren Daigle)
Top 8 – Bottom 4: "Call Out My Name" (the Weeknd)
Top 6: "People Help the People" (Birdy)
Top 6: Head-to-head: "Lost Without You" (Freya Ridings)
Grand Finale – Top 3: "Believe" (Cher)
Grand Finale – Top 2: "Your Song" (Elton John) – Eliminated – Runner-up

=== Josh Hannan ===
Audition: "Brother" (Matt Corby)
Top 50 Part 1 – Round 1: "Landslide" (Fleetwood Mac)
Top 50 Part 1 – Round 2: "Perfect" (Ed Sheeran)
Top 50 Part 2: "It'll Be Okay" (Shawn Mendes)
Top 24: "Glimpse of Us" (Joji)
Top 12: "You Found Me" (The Fray)
Top 10: "Forget Me" (Lewis Capaldi) <-- song picked by Judge: Meghan Trainor
Top 8: "Fix You" (Coldplay) ~ Judges’ Choice
Top 6: "Drivers License" (Olivia Rodrigo)
Top 6: Head-to-head: "Can't Help Falling in Love" (Elvis Presley)
Grand Finale – Top 3: "Hold Back the River" (James Bay) – Eliminated – Third Place

=== Anya Hynninen ===
Audition: "Ring Of Fire" (Johnny Cash)
Top 50 Part 1 – Round 1: Landslide (Fleetwood Mac)
Top 50 Part 1 – Round 2: "Can't Stop the Feeling!" (Justin Timberlake)
Top 50 Part 2: "I Was Made for Lovin' You" (Kiss)
Top 24: "The Best" (Tina Turner) ~ TOUCHDOWN!
Top 12: "Papa Don't Preach" (Madonna)
Top 10: "Back to Black" (Amy Winehouse) <-- song picked by Judge: Amy Shark
Top 10 – Bottom 4: "Killing Me Softly" (Roberta Flack)
Top 8: "Feeling Good" (Nina Simone)
Top 6: "Flowers" (Miley Cyrus)
Top 6: Head-to-head: "It's a Man's Man's Man's World" (James Brown) – Eliminated on 20 March

=== Ben Sheehy ===
Audition: "Whole Lotta Love" (Led Zeppelin)
Top 50 Part 1 – Round 1: "Wrecking Ball" (Miley Cyrus)
Top 50 Part 1 – Round 2: "Roar" (Katy Perry)
Top 50 Part 2: "Fortunate Son" (Creedence Clearwater Revival)
Top 24: "Immigrant Song" (Led Zeppelin)
Top 12: "Blaze of Glory" (Jon Bon Jovi)
Top 12 – Bottom 4: "River Deep – Mountain High" (Ike and Tina Turner)
Top 10: "Beggin'" (Måneskin) <-- song picked by Judge: Meghan Trainor
Top 10 – Bottom 4: "Gimme Shelter" (The Rolling Stones)
Top 8: "Joker & the Thief" (Wolfmother)
Top 6: "(I Can't Get No) Satisfaction" (The Rolling Stones)
Top 6: Head-to-head: "The Letter" (Joe Cocker) – Eliminated on 20 March

=== Amali Dimond ===
Audition: "Make You Feel My Love" (Adele)
Top 50 Part 1 – Round 1: "Wrecking Ball" (Miley Cyrus)
Top 50 Part 1 – Round 2: "Time After Time" (Cyndi Lauper)
Top 50 Part 2: "Before You Go" (Lewis Capaldi)
Top 24: "Unstoppable" (Sia)
Top 12: "Grenade" (Bruno Mars)
Top 10: "Titanium" (David Guetta) <-- song picked by Judge: Harry Connick Jr.
Top 8: "Unconditionally" (Katy Perry)
Top 8 – Bottom 4: "Secret Love Song" (Little Mix)
Top 6: "Fly Away" (Tones and I)
Top 6: Head-to-head: "Warrior" (Demi Lovato) – Eliminated on 20 March

=== Angelina Curtis ===
Audition: "Message to My Girl" (Split Enz)
Top 50 Part 1 – Round 1: "Try" (Pink)
Top 50 Part 1 – Round 2: "Time After Time" (Cyndi Lauper)
Top 50 Part 2: "Strong" (London Grammar)
Top 24: "The Only Exception" (Paramore) ~ TOUCHDOWN!
Top 12: "I Don't Want to Miss a Thing" (Aerosmith)
Top 10: "As It Was" (Harry Styles) <-- song picked by Judge: Meghan Trainor
Top 8: "Born To Try" (Delta Goodrem)
Top 8 – Bottom 4: "Talking to the Moon" (Bruno Mars) – Eliminated on 13 March

=== Noora H ===
Audition: "She Wolf" (Sia)
Top 50 Part 1 – Round 1: "Dangerous Woman" (Ariana Grande)
Top 50 Part 1 – Round 2: "Just the Way You Are" (Bruno Mars)
Top 50 Part 2: "Stay" (Rihanna)
Top 24: "Hopelessly Devoted to You" (Olivia Newton-John)
Top 12: "Shallow" (Lady Gaga and Bradley Cooper)
Top 12 – Bottom 4: "I Have Nothing" (Whitney Houston)
Top 10: "The Voice Within" (Christina Aguilera) <-- song picked by Judge: Harry Connick Jr. ~ Judges’ Choice
Top 8: "Scared To Be Lonely" (Dua Lipa and Martin Garrix)
Top 8 – Bottom 4: "Chandelier" (Sia) – Eliminated on 13 March

=== Sash Seabourne ===
Audition: "I Wanna Dance with Somebody" (Whitney Houston)
Top 50 Part 1 – Round 1: "Landslide" (Fleetwood Mac)
Top 50 Part 1 – Round 2: "Time After Time" (Cyndi Lauper)
Top 50 Part 2: "Finally" (CeCe Peniston)
Top 24: "Sex on Fire" (Kings of Leon)
Top 12: "Every Breath You Take" (The Police)
Top 10: "In The Air Tonight" (Phil Collins) <-- song picked by Judge: Kyle Sandilands
Top 10 – Bottom 4: "Free Fallin'" (Tom Petty) – Eliminated on 6 March

=== Harry Hayden ===
Audition: "I Am Changing" (Jennifer Hudson)
Top 50 Part 1 – Round 1: "Someone You Loved" (Lewis Capaldi)
Top 50 Part 1 – Round 2: "Just the Way You Are" (Bruno Mars)
Top 50 Part 2: "You Know I'm No Good" (Amy Winehouse)
Top 24: "Take Me to Church" (Hozier)
Top 12: "How Will I Know" (Whitney Houston)
Top 10: "Black and Gold" (Sam Sparro) <-- song picked by Judge: Harry Connick Jr.
Top 10 – Bottom 4: "Bust Your Windows" (Jazmine Sullivan) – Eliminated on 6 March

=== Maya Weiss ===
Audition: "Wings" (Little Mix)
Top 50 Part 1 – Round 1: "Dangerous Woman" (Ariana Grande)
Top 50 Part 1 – Round 2: "I'll Be There" (Jess Glynne)
Top 50 Part 2: "Ain't Nobody" (Chaka Khan)
Top 24: "Addicted to You" (Avicii) ~ TOUCHDOWN!
Top 12: "Cold Heart" (Elton John and Dua Lipa)
Top 12 – Bottom 4: "Titanium" (Sia) – Eliminated on 27 February

=== Jasey Fox ===
Audition: "Bohemian Rhapsody" (Queen)
Top 50 Part 1 – Round 1: "Wrecking Ball" (Miley Cyrus)
Top 50 Part 1 – Round 2: "Time After Time" (Cyndi Lauper)
Top 50 Part 2: "Does Your Mother Know" (ABBA)
Top 24: "Grace Kelly" (Mika)
Top 12: "Youngblood" (5 Seconds of Summer)
Top 12 – Bottom 4: "Waking Up in Vegas" (Katy Perry) – Eliminated on 27 February

== Live performances ==
During each round of the live performances, each contestant sings a song with a given theme. After all contestants have sung, the judges choose one contestant to directly advance to the next stage, then the public is given approximately 24 hours to vote for their favourite singers. During the results night, after voting has closed, the four contestants with the fewest votes sing again, then the two contestants with the lowest votes are eliminated.

Singer received immunity and advanced to the next stage
Singer was in the bottom four
Singer was eliminated

=== Top 12 (26–27 February) ===
Singers Top 12 result
Singer	Order	Song	Result
Jasey Fox	1	"Youngblood" by 5 Seconds of Summer	Bottom Four
Angelina Curtis	2	"I Don't Want to Miss a Thing" by Aerosmith	Safe
Maya Weiss	3	"Cold Heart" by Elton John and Dua Lipa	Bottom Four
Josh Hannan	4	"You Found Me" by The Fray	Safe
Amali Dimond	5	"Grenade" by Bruno Mars	Safe
Ben Sheehy	6	"Blaze of Glory" by Jon Bon Jovi	Bottom Four
Noora H	7	"Shallow" by Lady Gaga and Bradley Cooper	Bottom Four
Harry Hayden	8	"How Will I Know" by Whitney Houston	Safe
Anya Hynninen	9	"Papa Don't Preach" by Madonna	Safe
Sash Seabourne	10	"Every Breath You Take" by The Police	Safe
Phoebe Stewart	11	"Beneath Your Beautiful" by Labrinth ft. Emeli Sandé	Judges' Vote
Royston Sagigi-Baira	12	"Man In The Mirror" by Michael Jackson	Safe
Songs on results night
Jasey Fox	1	"Waking Up in Vegas" by Katy Perry	Eliminated
Maya Weiss	2	"Titanium" by Sia	Eliminated
Ben Sheehy	3	"River Deep – Mountain High" by Ike and Tina Turner	Safe
Noora H	4	"I Have Nothing" by Whitney Houston	Safe

=== Top 10 (5–6 March) ===
Singers Top 10 result
Singer	Order	Song	Chosen By	Result
Josh Hannan	1	"Forget Me" by Lewis Capaldi	Amy Shark	Safe
Amali Dimond	2	"Titanium" by David Guetta ft. Sia	Harry Connick Jr.	Safe
Anya Hynninen	3	"Back to Black" by Amy Winehouse	Meghan Trainor	Bottom Four
Royston Sagigi-Baira	4	"I Won't Let You Go" by James Morrison	Amy Shark	Safe
Angelina Curtis	5	"As It Was" by Harry Styles	Meghan Trainor	Safe
Sash Seabourne	6	"In The Air Tonight" by Phil Collins	Kyle Sandilands	Bottom Four
Noora H	7	"The Voice Within" by Christina Aguilera	Harry Connick Jr.	Judges' Vote
Ben Sheehy	8	"Beggin'" by Måneskin	Meghan Trainor	Bottom Four
Harry Hayden	9	"Black and Gold" by Sam Sparro	Harry Connick Jr.	Bottom Four
Phoebe Stewart	10	"Dancing Queen" by ABBA	Meghan Trainor	Safe
Songs on results night
Anya Hynninen	1	"Killing Me Softly" by Roberta Flack		Safe
Sash Seabourne	2	"Free Fallin'" by Tom Petty		Eliminated
Ben Sheehy	3	"Gimme Shelter" by The Rolling Stones		Safe
Harry Hayden	4	"Bust Your Windows" by Jazmine Sullivan		Eliminated

=== Top 8 (12–13 March) ===
Singers Top 8 result
Singer	Order	Song	Song dedicated to	Result
Amali Dimond	1	"Unconditionally" by Katy Perry	Her father, Craig Dimond	Bottom Four
Angelina Curtis	2	"Born To Try" by Delta Goodrem	Delta Goodrem	Bottom Four
Royston Sagigi-Baira	3	"The Climb" by Miley Cyrus	Year 2 teacher, Miss Alex	Safe
Noora H	4	"Scared To Be Lonely" by Dua Lipa and Martin Garrix	Her online community	Bottom Four
Phoebe Stewart	5	"You Say" by Lauren Daigle	Late Grandfather	Bottom Four
Ben Sheehy	6	"Joker & the Thief" by Wolfmother	Former music school	Safe
Anya Hynninen	7	"Feeling Good" by Nina Simone	Hometown of Selby	Safe
Josh Hannan	8	"Fix You" by Coldplay	Music teacher, Tracey	Judges' Vote
Songs on results night
Amali Dimond	1	"Secret Love Song" by Little Mix		Safe
Angelina Curtis	2	"Talking to the Moon" by Bruno Mars		Eliminated
Noora H	3	"Chandelier" by Sia		Eliminated
Phoebe Stewart	4	"Call Out My Name" by the Weeknd		Safe

- Kyle was absent on performance night.

=== Top 6 (19–20 March) ===
Each contestant performed a song on live performance night. The judges opted not to put any singer directly into the Grand Finale, meaning that all results would be decided by the public vote. On results night, after voting had closed, the contestants each sang again. After each pair of contestants had sung, the results were announced for those two singers: one eliminated, and one was put through to the Grand Finale, three in total.

Singers Top 6 result
Singer	Order	Song chosen by public	Result
Ben Sheehy	1	"(I Can't Get No) Satisfaction" by The Rolling Stones	—N/a
Phoebe Stewart	2	"People Help the People" by Birdy	—N/a
Amali Dimond	3	"Fly Away" by Tones and I	—N/a
Josh Hannan	4	"Drivers License" by Olivia Rodrigo	—N/a
Anya Hynninen	5	"Flowers" by Miley Cyrus	—N/a
Royston Sagigi-Baira	6	"True Colors" by Cyndi Lauper	—N/a
Songs on results night
Royston Sagigi-Baira	Pair 1	"I Want to Know What Love Is" by Foreigner	Safe
Anya Hynninen	Pair 1	"It's a Man's Man's Man's World" by James Brown	Eliminated
Ben Sheehy	Pair 2	"The Letter" by Joe Cocker	Eliminated
Phoebe Stewart	Pair 2	"Lost Without You" by Freya Ridings	Safe
Josh Hannan	Pair 3	"Can't Help Falling in Love" by Elvis Presley	Safe
Amali Dimond	Pair 3	"Warrior" by Demi Lovato	Eliminated

== Grand finale performances ==
Unlike earlier rounds, there will be no "performance night" for the Final 3. Instead, voting for the winner of Australian Idol opened immediately after the Final 6 results night on 20 March, and closes just before the grand finale. The winner of the Australian Idol was announced as Royston Sagigi-Baira.

=== Grand finale (26 March) ===
Singer/Group performances
Order	Performer(s)	Title
1	Top 3 ft. Top 12	"Celestial"
2	Phoebe Stewart	"Believe"
3	Josh Hannan	"Hold Back the River"
4	Royston Sagigi-Baira	"I Can't Make You Love Me"
5	Harry Connick Jr.	"Come by Me"
6	Phoebe Stewart	"Your Song"
7	Royston Sagigi-Baira	"When You Believe"
8	Jess Mauboy	"Right Here, Right Now"
9	Royston Sagigi-Baira	"Invincible" (winners single)

Grand finale result
Singer	Result
Royston Sagigi-Baira	Winner
Phoebe Stewart	Runner-up
Josh Hannan	Eliminated

== Elimination chart ==
Females	Males	Top 24	Top 12	Top 12 "Touchdown"	Winner

Did Not Perform	Safe	Bottom 4	Judges’ Vote	Eliminated

Stage:		Top 24			Finals				
Week:		19/2	20/2	21/2	26/2	5/3	12/3	19/3	26/3
Place	Contestant	Result							
1	Royston Sagigi-Baira	Top 12							Winner
2	Phoebe Stewart		Top 12		Top 10		Bottom 4		Runner-up
3	Josh Hannan			Top 12			Top 6		Eliminated
4	Amali Dimond	Top 12					Bottom 4	Eliminated	
5	Ben Sheehy	Top 12			Bottom 4	Bottom 4		Eliminated	
6	Anya Hynninen	Top 12				Bottom 4		Eliminated	
7–8	Angelina Curtis			Top 12			Eliminated		
7–8	Noora H			Top 12	Bottom 4	Top 8	Eliminated		
9–10	Sash Seabourne		Top 12			Eliminated			
9–10	Harry Hayden		Top 12			Eliminated			
11–12	Maya Weiss		Top 12		Eliminated				
11–12	Jasey Fox			Top 12	Eliminated				
Top 24 (Part 3)	Sharin Attamimi			Eliminated					
Top 24 (Part 3)	Bobby Holmes			Eliminated					
Top 24 (Part 3)	Sara Houston			Eliminated					
Top 24 (Part 3)	Peter Kara			Eliminated					
Top 24 (Part 2)	Naomi Gipey		Eliminated						
Top 24 (Part 2)	Cooper Turnbull		Eliminated						
Top 24 (Part 2)	Kristie Baillie		Eliminated						
Top 24 (Part 2)	Damien Agius		Eliminated						
Top 24 (Part 1)	Bec Voysey	Eliminated							
Top 24 (Part 1)	James Vawser	Eliminated							
Top 24 (Part 1)	Piper Butcher	Eliminated							
Top 24 (Part 1)	Noah Cookson	Eliminated							

== Ratings ==
The show premiered on 30 January 2023 to modest ratings, less than half the viewers of Married at First Sight on Nine and slightly behind Australian Survivor on Ten, which both premiered on the same night. It consistently finished behind both of those shows throughout its run coming third in its timeslot.

Episode			Original airdate	Timeslot	Overnight metro viewers (millions)	Night rank	Total national viewers (millions)	Night rank	Source
1	"Auditions"		30 January 2023	Monday 7:30 pm	0.413	15	0.885	11	
2	"Auditions"		31 January 2023	Tuesday 7:30 pm	0.434	11	0.841	9	
3	"Auditions"		1 February 2023	Wednesday 7:30 pm	0.370	12	0.801	8	
4	"Auditions"		5 February 2023	Sunday 7:00 pm	0.434	9	0.867	6	
5	"Auditions"		6 February 2023	Monday 7:30 pm	0.410	15	0.814	12	
6	"Auditions"		7 February 2023	Tuesday 7:30 pm	0.417	11	0.809	9	
7	"Auditions"		12 February 2023	Sunday 7:00 pm	0.453	9	0.857	9	
8	"Top 50"		13 February 2023	Monday 7:30 pm	0.425	13	0.841	10	
9	"Top 50"		14 February 2023	Tuesday 7:30pm	0.420	11	0.836	10	
10	"Top 24"		19 February 2023	Sunday 7:00 pm	0.441	9	0.860	8	
11	"Top 24"		20 February 2023	Monday 7:30 pm	0.412	13	0.795	12	
12	"Top 24"		21 February 2023	Tuesday 7:30 pm	0.423	12	0.783	10	
13	"Top 12"	"Live acts"	26 February 2023	Sunday 7:00 pm	0.451	8	0.844	8	
14	"Top 12"	"Live results"	27 February 2023	Monday 7:30 pm	0.422	13	0.828	10	
15	"Top 10"	"Live acts"	5 March 2023	Sunday 7:00 pm	0.453	9	0.849	8	
16	"Top 10"	"Live results"	6 March 2023	Monday 7:30 pm	0.455	11	0.846	10	
17	"Top 8"	"Live acts"	12 March 2023	Sunday 7:00 pm	0.417	9	0.794	9	
18	"Top 8"	"Live results"	13 March 2023	Monday 7:30 pm	0.409	15	0.804	10	
19	"Top 6"	"Live acts"	19 March 2023	Sunday 7:00 pm	0.467	8	0.861	7	
20	"Top 6"	"Live results"	20 March 2023	Monday 7:30 pm	0.439	12	0.805	10	
21	"Grand Finale" "Winner Announced"		26 March 2023	Sunday 7:00pm Sunday 9:00pm	0.575 0.607	5 4	0.959 1.032	5 4	
