= Royston Sagigi-Baira =

- Born: December 25, 1998 (age 27); Australia
- Origin: Mapoon, Queensland, Australia
- Occupation: Singer
- Instrument: Vocals
- Years active: 2018–present
- Label: Sony Music Australia (2023–present)

Royston Sagigi-Baira, also known as Royston Noell, is an Australian singer best known for winning the eighth season of Australian Idol in 2023. He officially won the title in March 2023, $100,000 prize money and a recording contract with Sony Music Australia.

== Early life ==
Royston Sagigi-Baira is a Thanakwith (Aboriginal) and Wagadagam (Torres Strait Islander) man from Mapoon, Queensland.

Sagigi-Baira reflected saying "Most kids wanted to play rugby or go fishing, but I just wanted to sing It's all I ever wanted to do.". In year 2, his teacher gave him High School Musical DVD as a prize, saying "I took it home and watched it over and over again and completely fell in love with music, especially singing."

Sagigi-Baira sang in church and in school. Sagigi-Baira attended the Aboriginal Centre for the Performing Arts (ACPA) in Brisbane and as of 2023, is in his second year of a Bachelor of Fine Arts (Music) degree at the Queensland University of Technology.

== Career ==
=== 2018–2022: All Together Now ===
In 2018, Sagigi-Baira competed on the Australian version of All Together Now, becoming the first contestant to snag a perfect score of 100 performiong Sam Smith's "Lay Me Down" eventually been the last contestant eliminated behind Lai Utovou and Tarryn Stokes.

During NAIDOC Week in July 2022, Aboriginal Christian leader, poet and writer Brooke Prentis spoke with Sagigi-Baira on national radio about the theme "Get Up! Stand up! Show up!"

In November 2022, Sagigi-Baira released his debut single "When I Fall Apart" under the name Royston Noell.

=== 2023: Australian Idol ===
In 2023, Sagigi-Baira audition for the Seven Network reboot of Australian Idol with the song "I'm Not the Only One" by Sam Smith, receiving a golden ticket to the top 50. He went on to advance through from the top 50 to the top 24, and then made it to the top 12 live shows.

Sagigi-Baira advanced through to the top ten, then top eight and then top 6 before finding himself in the grand finale, and final three.

Upon being announced as a grand finalist Noell said "I can't believe this. This is crazy. This is a testament [to the fact] that no matter where you come from, as long as you work hard, you can follow your dreams, and they can come true."

Australian Idol performances and results (2023)
Episode	Song	Original Artist	Result
Auditions	"I'm Not the Only One"	Sam Smith	Through to Top 50
Top 50 Part 1-Round 1	"Wrecking Ball"	Miley Cyrus	Through to Round 2
Top 50 Part 1-Round 2	"I'll Be There"	Jess Glynne	Through to Part 2
Top 50 Part 2	"Everything I Wanted"	Billie Eilish	Through to Top 24
Top 24	"Versace on the Floor"	Bruno Mars	Through to Top 12
Top 12	"Man In The Mirror"	Michael Jackson	Through to Top 10
Top 10	"I Won't Let You Go"	James Morrison	Through to Top 8
Top 8	"The Climb"	Miley Cyrus	Through to Top 6
Top 6	"True Colors"	Cyndi Lauper	Perform Head to Head
Top 6-Head to Head	"I Want to Know What Love Is"	Foreigner	Through to Grand Finale
Grand Finale-Top 3	"I Can't Make You Love Me"	Bonnie Raitt	Through to Top 2
Grand Finale-Top 2	"When You Believe"	Whitney Houston	Winner
Grand Finale-Top 2	"Invincible"	winners single	Winner

After a performance on Whitney Houston's "When You Believe", Sagigi-Baira was announced as the winner.

Immediately after the announcement, his winners single "Invincible", written by Tones and I, was released. The song was compared to Rihanna's "Diamonds" on Radio 6PR.

In November 2023, he released "Dreaming".

In November 2024, Noell released "Feeling Good" and announced the release of his debut EP Sunrise.

== Personal life ==
Sagigi-Baira is currently residing in Cape York, in far north Queensland.

== Discography ==
=== Extended plays ===
List of EPs, with selected details
Title	Details
Sunrise	Released: February 2025; Label: Sony Music Australia

=== Singles ===
List of singles
Title	Year	Album
"When I Fall Apart"	2022	Non-album singles
"Invincible"	2023	Non-album singles
"Dreaming"	2023	Sunrise
"Say It Loud"	2024	Sunrise
"Feeling Good"	2024	Sunrise
"Way Up"	2025	Sunrise

== Awards and nominations ==
=== National Indigenous Music Awards ===
The National Indigenous Music Awards recognise excellence, innovation and leadership among Aboriginal and Torres Strait Islander musicians from throughout Australia. They commenced in 2004.

Year	Nominee / work	Award	Result	Ref.
2023	Himself	New Talent of the Year	Nominated	

Preceded by Stan Walker	Australian Idol; Winner; Season 8 (2023)	Succeeded by Dylan Wright
