= Bangalow =

Town in New South Wales, Australia

- Town
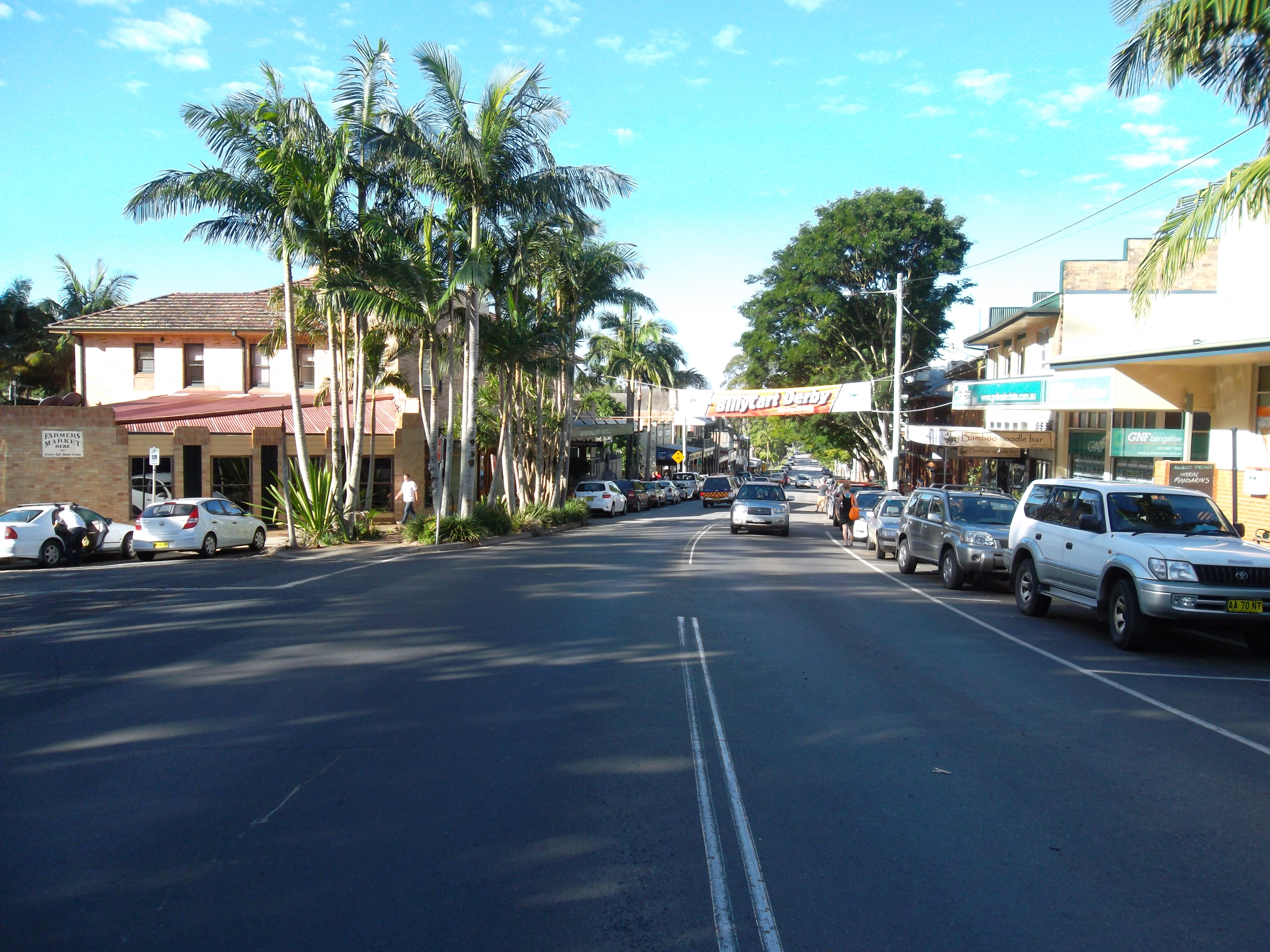
- Byron Street—Bangalow's main street

- Coordinates: 28°42′0″S 153°31′0″E
- Country: Australia
- State: New South Wales
- LGA: Byron Shire
- Location: 765 km (475 mi) NE of Sydney; 167 km (104 mi) S of Brisbane; 14 km (8.7 mi) SW of Byron Bay; 24 km (15 mi) N of Ballina

Government
  - State electorate: Ballina
  - Federal division: Richmond
- Elevation: 55 m (180 ft)

Population
  - Total: 2,260 (2021 census)
- Postcode: 2479

Bangalow (BANG-ga-low) is a small town in the Northern Rivers region of New South Wales, Australia in Byron Shire. The town is 765 kilometres (475 mi) north of Sydney and 167 kilometres (104 mi) south of Brisbane, just off the Pacific Highway.

It is on the Lands of the Bundjalung people.

== Origin of place name ==
Originally known to colonists as Byron Creek and when the railway was being built there were concerns that this name would cause confusion with the nearby Byron Bay. Because of this alternate names were suggestion and for a brief time, from at least the 1893, the town was known as 'Granuaile', likely after the Irish pirate-queen Granuaile. This proposed name reflected the number of colonists with Irish heritage. This was the name first given to the railway station and one of the nearby local pubs

It was renamed Bangalow, often spelt Bangaloe, from 1894 and the modern spelling was clarified in 1907. This name is thought to have been derived from a Bundjalung language word, in the Wibadhabi dialect, 'bangalla', which said to mean 'a low hill' or 'a kind of palm tree'. This is, however, contested.

== History ==
Bangalow's historic streetscape, monthly market and proximity to the popular tourist resort of Byron Bay has increased its appeal as a tourist destination. Timber cutters established a camp on the banks of Byron Creek in the 1840s but it was not until the 1880s that a town appeared on the site.

In recent years Bangalow has become a pleasant stop for holiday-makers and day-trippers as its main street is lined with cafes and boutique-shops. Organic produce grown nearby is a regular feature in the cafes and at the monthly farmers market. The village is home to a number of heritage buildings with many of these built in the style Federation architecture. Information about many of these heritage buildings are available via a self-guided tour called the Bangalow Heritage Walk.

Some of these heritage buildings are:

- Bangalow A & I Hall; The hall was built in 1911 to be used for the annual Agriculture and Industrial show but it has been used since for many events; including as a cinema, a hospital during the 1919 Spanish flu, and, in wartime, to farewell and welcome home soldiers. It fell into disuse in the late 20th century and was close to being demolished; between 1991 and 1994 major restoration works were completed and it was re-opened on 11 June 1994.
- Bangalow Police Station and Courthouse; These were built in 1905 and 1909 respectively when Bangalow was in a growth period. Before the construction of the police station, and associated lock-up, the police were required to transport people in custody to the Byron Bay Police Station. The Courthouse officially opened in May 1910 as the Bangalow Court of Petty Sessions which operated until 1964. The Courthouse now operates as the Police Station.
- Bangalow Public School; This school was first built in 1884 and was originally known as the Byron Creek Provisional School and renamed in 1907. In 1925, a 4 classroom brick building block was built which is now heritage listed.
- Bangalow Uniting Church; This church was first built in 1909 - 1910 but was destroyed and rebuilt in 1914 after a tornado blew down the original (Methodist) church. The church congregation is still active.
- Granuaille Hotel; This hotel was built in 1891 and burnt down on 29 April 1939 and replaced by what is now known as the Bangalow Hotel in 1940.

Bangalow is also home to the Bangalow Heritage House Museum which gives information about the town and regions history; this museum is run by the Bangalow Historical Society It is located in an Queenslander-style wooden building on the corner of Ashton and Deacon Streets.

== Markets and events ==
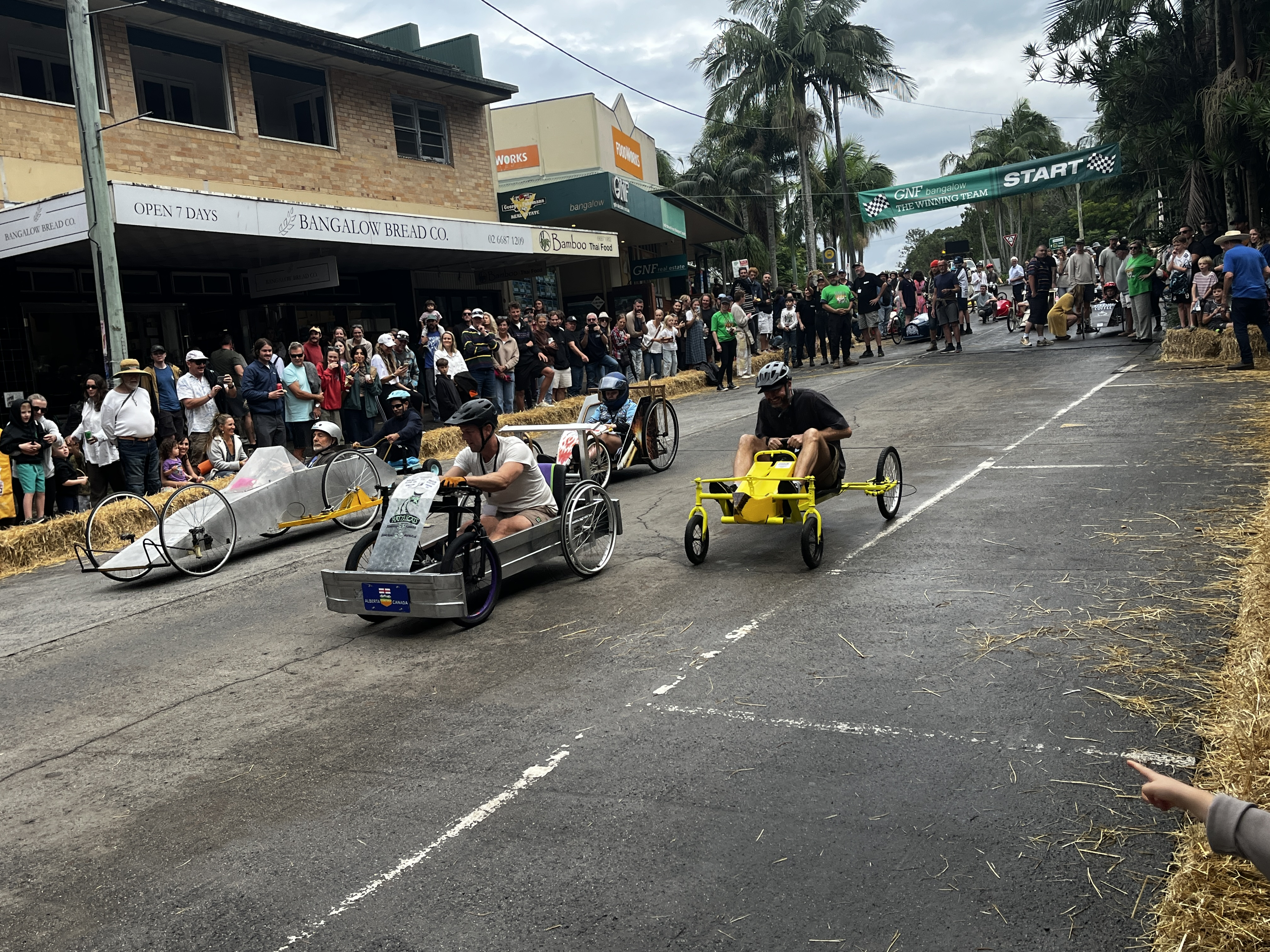
Bangalow Billycart Derby, 2025

Bangalow is home to the weekly Bangalow Farmers' Market which are held Saturday mornings, from 8am - 11am. These markets feature a variety of local farmers and producers and have been running since 2004. Each month (on the 4th Sunday) the Bangalow Markets are held, at the showgrounds and these markets have been operating since 1982.

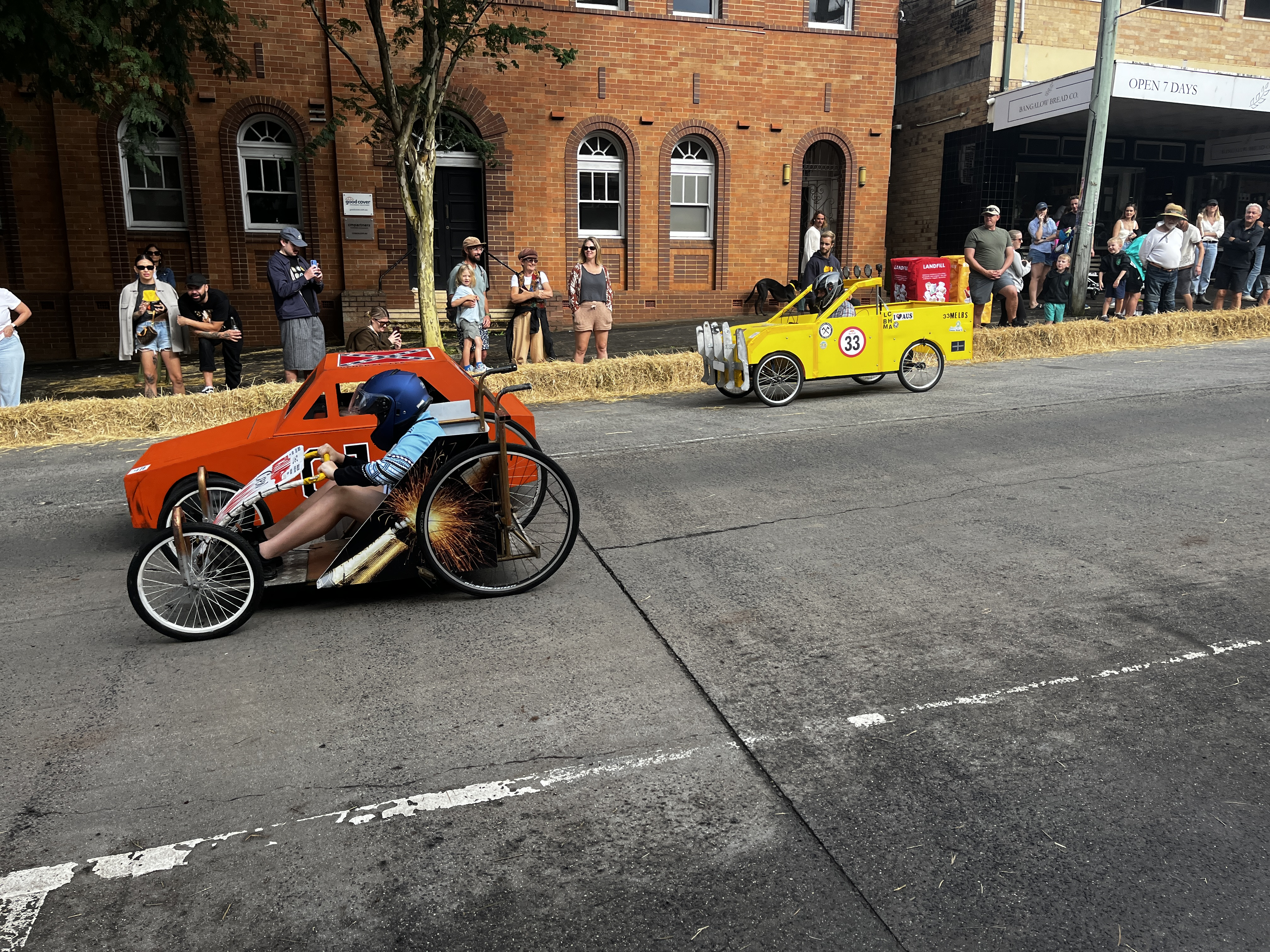
Bangalow Billycart Derby, 2025

Additionally number of major events are held in Bangalow each year and these include the following annual events:

- Bangalow Billycart Derby: held in May and hosted by the Bangalow Lions Club. This event began in 1994 and features homemade billy carts which are raced down the main street of the town, with these races held for various age groups and cart designs.
- Bangalow Show: this is held in November over two days and it showcases local rural life and the activities and produce of the area; it was first established in 1897.
- Sample Food Festival: held in September at the showgrounds this festival lets visitors sample plates from restaurants, breweries and distilleries from around the Northern Rivers Region.

== Population ==
Historical population
Year	Pop.	±%
1966	479	—
1971	534	+11.5%
1976	568	+6.4%
1981	614	+8.1%
1986	677	+10.3%
1991	819	+21.0%
1996	896	+9.4%
2001	1,225	+36.7%
2006	1,327	+8.3%
2011	1,520	+14.5%
2016	1,689	+11.1%
2021	2,260	+33.8%
Source: Australian Bureau of Statistics data.

At the 2021 census, Bangalow had a population of 2,260 people. 73.1% of people were born in Australia. The next most common countries of birth were England 7.1%, New Zealand 3.0% and United States of America 1.2%. 84.2% of people only spoke English at home. The most common responses for religion were No Religion 61.38%, Catholic 11.8%, Not stated 9.6% and Anglican 7.1%.

== Gallery ==
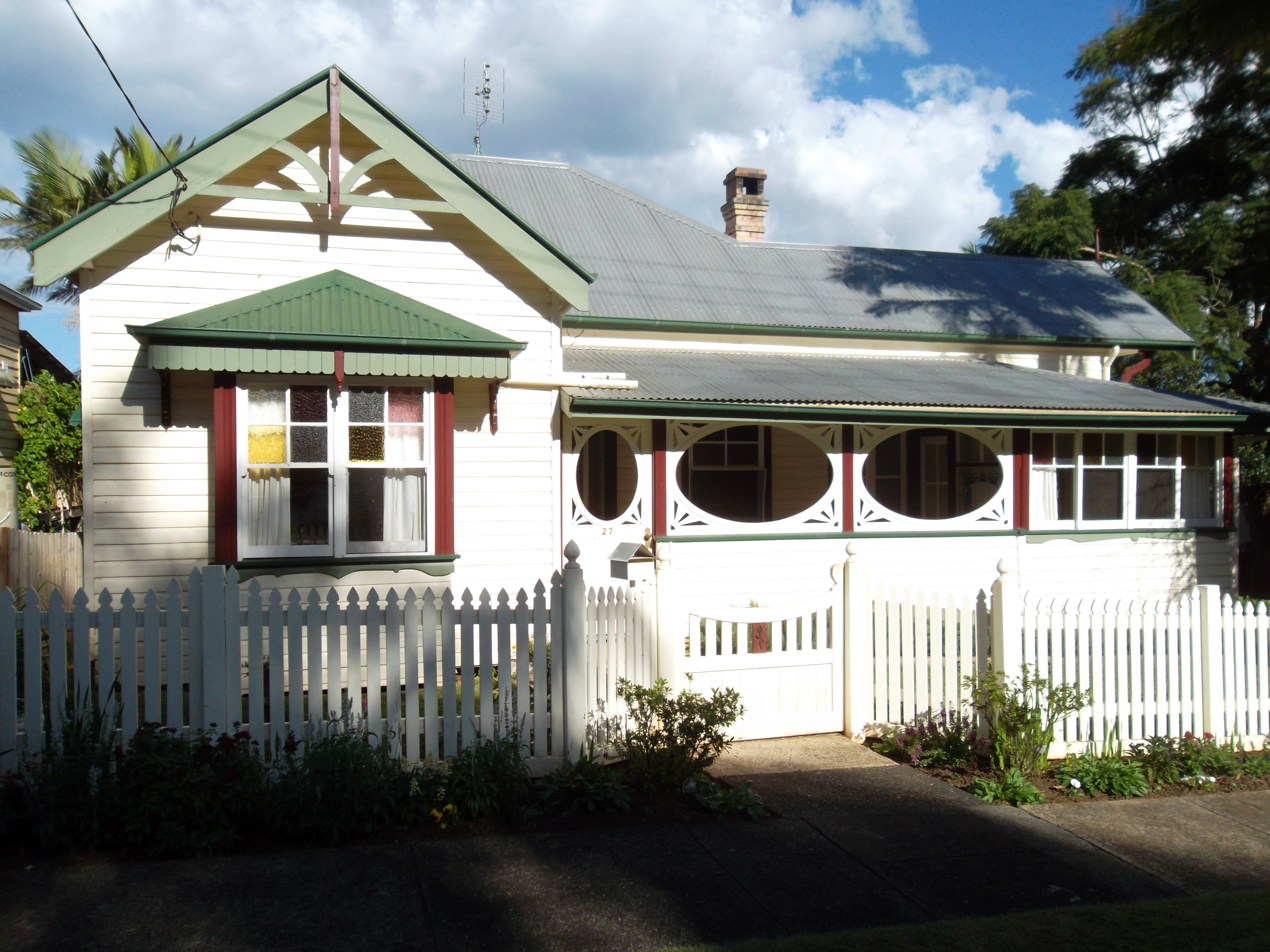
Private residence, Bangalow, May 2014

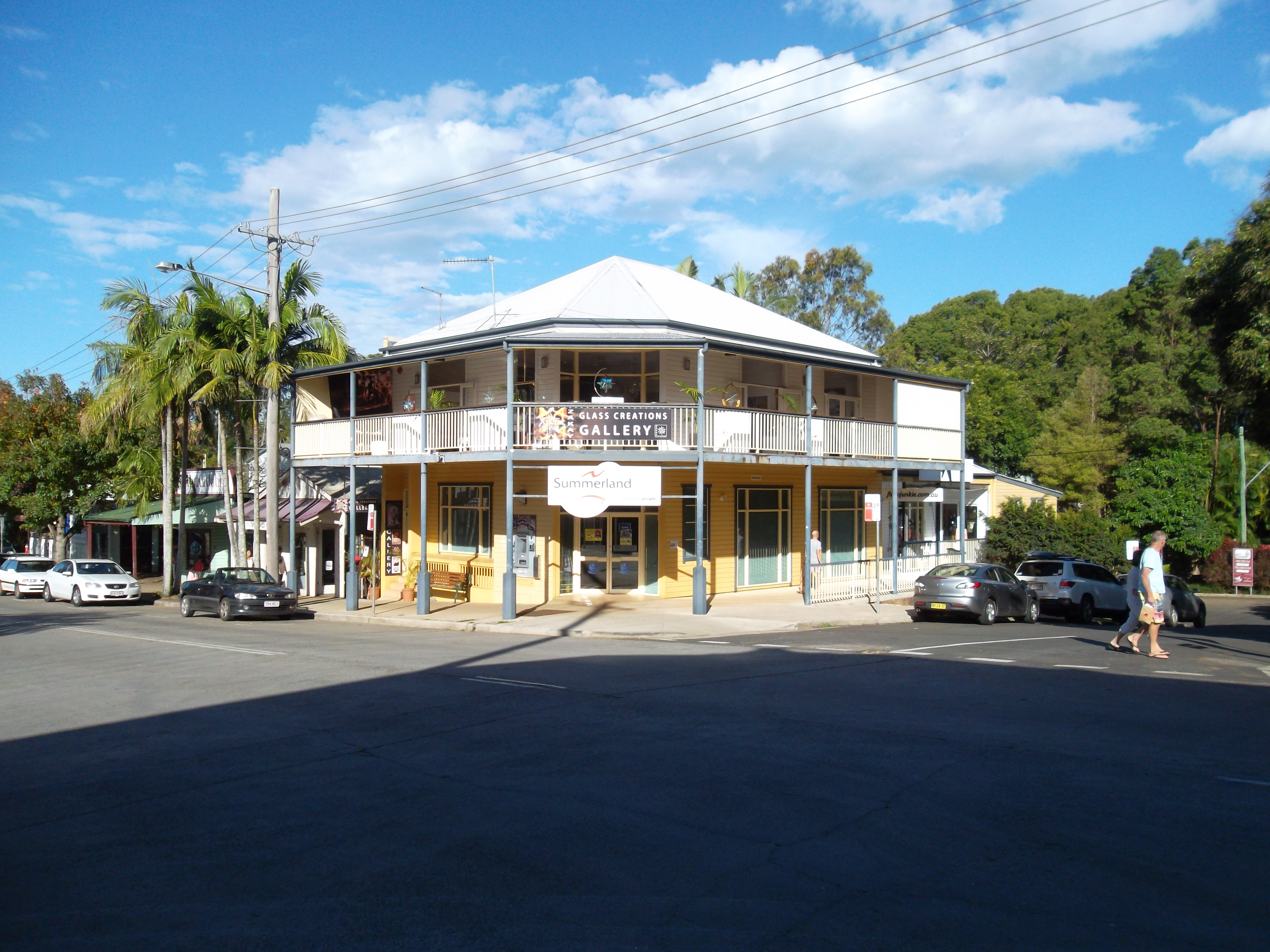
Corner store, May 2014

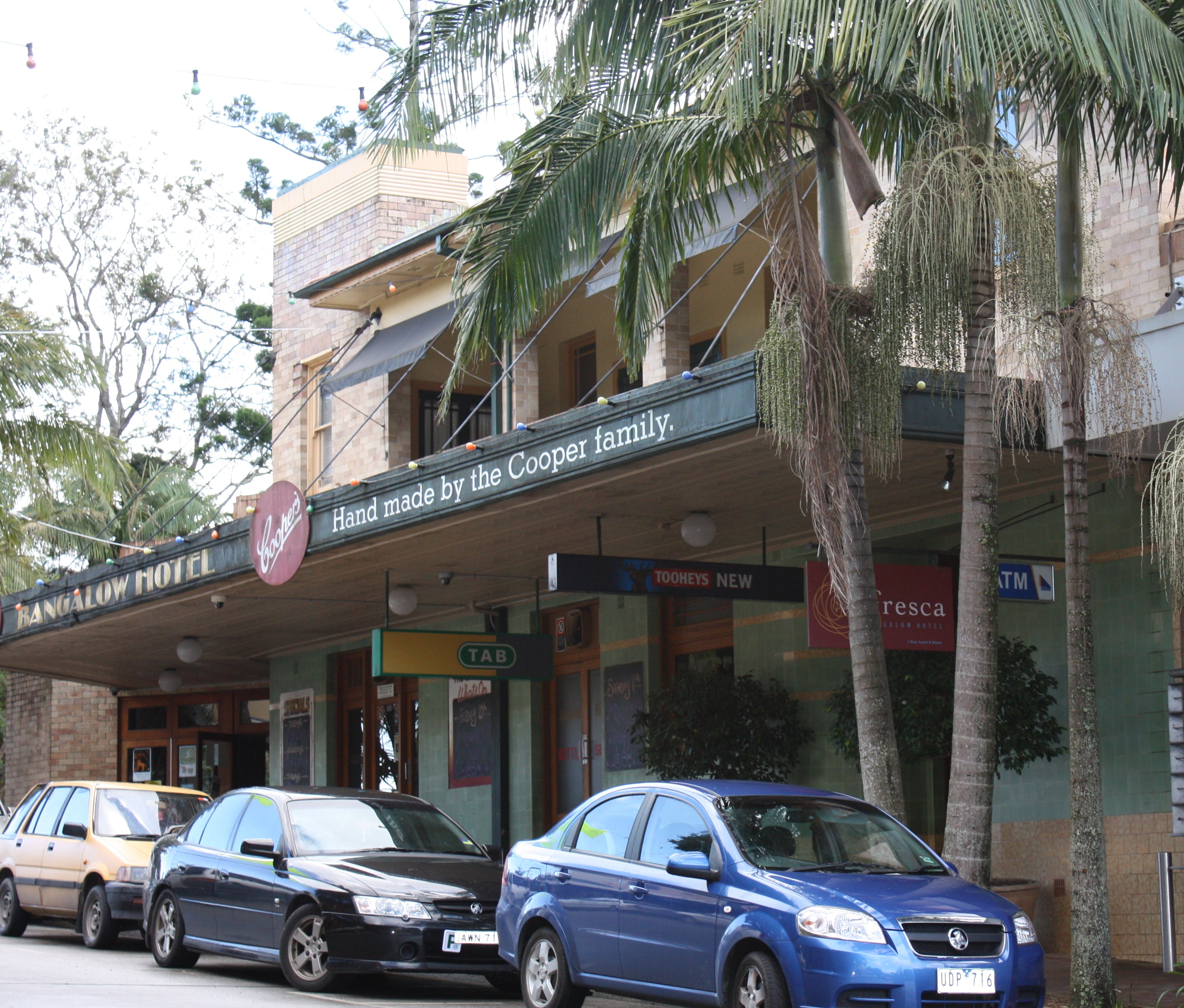
Bangalow Hotel, July 2011

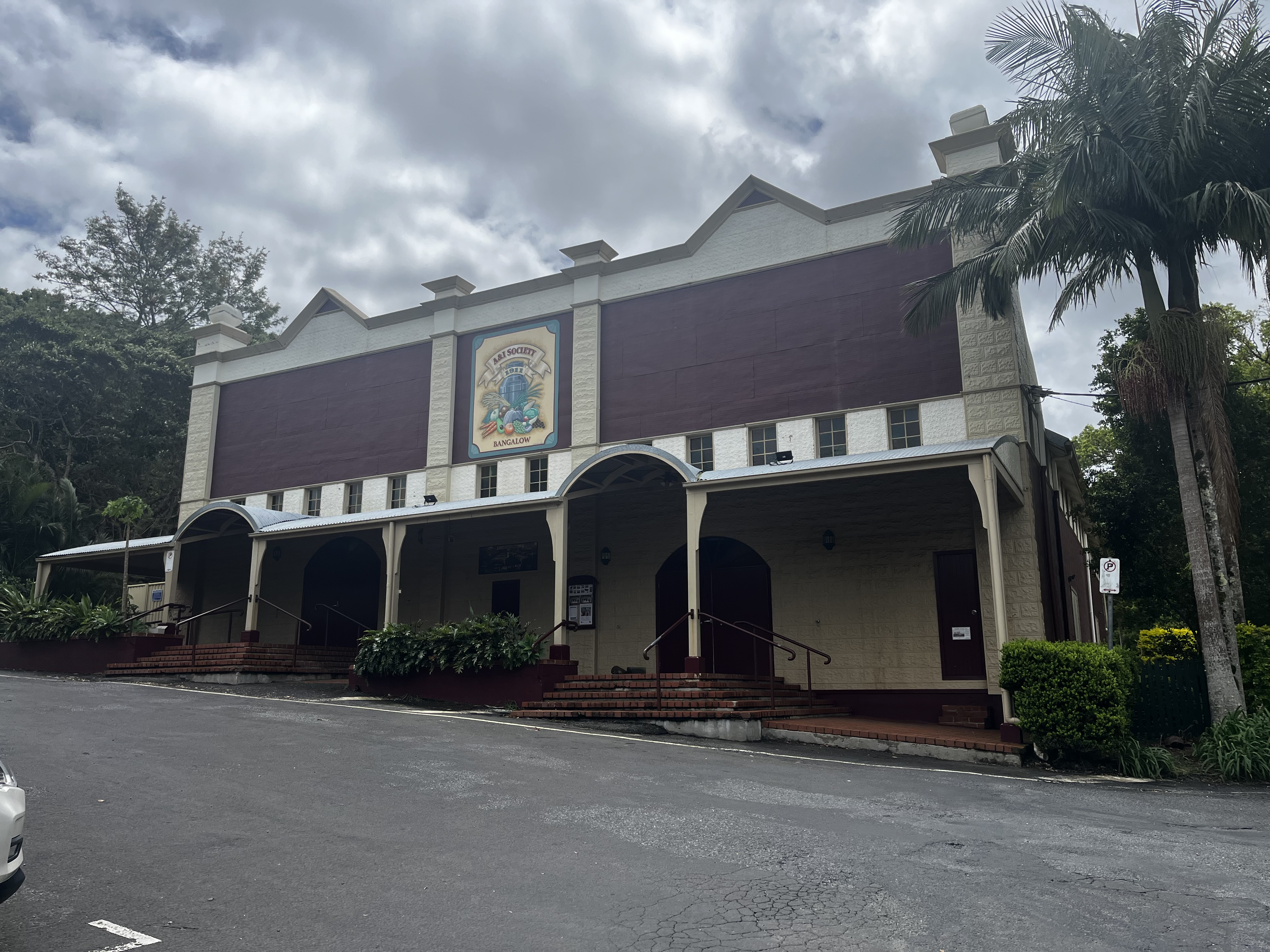
A & I Hall Bangalow, September 2024
