= List of songs written by Willie Dixon =

Songs written by Willie Dixon

Willie Dixon was a Chicago blues musician widely regarded as one of the most influential songwriters in blues history. He wrote or co-wrote over 500 songs, many of which were recorded by the leading blues artists of his era, including Muddy Waters, Howlin' Wolf, and Little Walter. His work later reached wider audiences when rock acts such as the Rolling Stones, Cream, and Led Zeppelin recorded his compositions, and musicians across multiple genres have continued to interpret his songs.

List of songs with title, first recorded by, year, and subsequently recorded by
Title	First recorded by	Year	Subsequently recorded by
"29 Ways"	Willie Dixon	1956	Koko Taylor, Marc Cohn, The Blues Band, Dr. Feelgood
"As Long as I Have You"	Little Walter	1960	The Ford Blues Band, John P. Hammond, George Thorogood
"Back Door Man"	Howlin' Wolf	1960	The Doors, Grateful Dead, Shadows of Knight, Bob Weir, The Blues Project, The Blues Band
"The Big Boat" a.k.a. "Somebody Tell that Woman"	Big Three Trio	1955	Peter, Paul and Mary
"Bring It On Home" (Note: Led Zeppelin copied portions of Dixon's "Bring It On Home" for the introduction and outro of their song of the same name on Led Zeppelin II. A lawsuit on behalf of Dixon was brought against Jimmy Page, et al. and was settled out of court. Subsequent releases of the group's "Bring It On Home" listed Dixon as the songwriter, with their original portions re-titled "Bring It On Back" and credited to the group members. ISWC T-914.040.241-1.)	Sonny Boy Williamson II	1963	Led Zeppelin, Van Morrison, Dread Zeppelin, Johnny Thunders, Widespread Panic, Hawkwind, Canned Heat
"Built for Comfort"	Willie Dixon	1959	Howlin' Wolf, Canned Heat, UFO, Juicy Lucy, Dana Gillespie
"Close to You"	Muddy Waters	1958	Stevie Ray Vaughan, The Doors
"Crazy for My Baby"	Willie Dixon	1955	Little Walter, Colin James, Charlie Musselwhite
"Crazy Love"	Buddy Guy	1967	
"Crazy Mixed Up World"	Little Walter	1959	James Harman Band
"Dead Presidents"	Little Walter	1963	The J. Geils Band
"Diddy Wah Diddy"	Bo Diddley	1955	Captain Beefheart, The Remains, Bruce Springsteen, Tom Petty and the Heartbreakers, The Blues Band
"Do Me Right"	Lowell Fulson	1955	Willie Dixon
"Do the Do"	Howlin' Wolf	1962	Top Jimmy & the Rhythm Pigs
"Don't Go No Further"	Muddy Waters	1956	The Doors, B.B. King, John P. Hammond
"Don't You Tell Me Nothin'"	Willie Dixon	1986	used in the film The Color of Money
"Down in the Bottom"	Howlin' Wolf	1961	Bill Wyman's Rhythm Kings, John P. Hammond, Siegel–Schwall Band, Barry McGuire
"Eternity"	Grateful Dead	1992	
"Everything but You"	Jimmy Witherspoon	1959	
"Evil"	Howlin' Wolf	1954	Canned Heat, Captain Beefheart, Monster Magnet, Luther Allison, Derek and the Dominos, Gary Moore, Cactus, The Faces, Steve Miller, Koko Taylor, Jeff Healey, Tom Jones, Greta Van Fleet
"Fishin' in My Pond"	Lee Jackson	1957	Hip Linkchain, Jimmy Rogers, Willie Dixon
"Groanin' the Blues"	Otis Rush	1957	Eric Clapton, Buddy Guy
"Help Me"	Sonny Boy Williamson II	1963	Ten Years After, Charlie Musselwhite, Canned Heat, Junior Wells, Luther Allison, Johnny Winter, James Cotton
"Hidden Charms"	Charles Clark	1958	Howlin' Wolf, Link Wray, Elvis Costello
"Hoochie Coochie Man"	Muddy Waters	1954	Willie Dixon, Shadows of Knight, Eric Burdon, The Nashville Teens, Dion, The Allman Brothers Band, Alexis Korner, Steppenwolf, Chuck Berry, Motörhead, Eric Clapton, John P. Hammond, Jimi Hendrix, Jeff Healey, Manfred Mann, New York Dolls, Dave Van Ronk, Phish
"Howlin' for My Baby"	Howlin' Wolf	1959	George Thorogood, Paul Filipowicz
"I Ain't Superstitious"	Howlin' Wolf	1961	Jeff Beck Group, Grateful Dead, Megadeth, Chris Spedding, The White Stripes, The Yardbirds, Howlin' Wolf
"I Can't Quit You Baby"	Otis Rush	1956	Little Milton, Willie Dixon, John Mayall & the Bluesbreakers, Led Zeppelin, Gary Moore, Dread Zeppelin, Nine Below Zero
"I Can't Understand" (co-written with Cesar Rojas)	Los Lobos	1990	
"I Don't Play"	Little Walter	1960	Robben Ford
"I Got My Brand on You"	Muddy Waters	1960	Alexis Korner
"I Got What It Takes"	Koko Taylor	1964	
"I Just Want to Make Love to You"	Muddy Waters	1954	Willie Dixon, The Animals, The Kinks, The Yardbirds, Shadows of Knight, Mungo Jerry, Grateful Dead, Foghat, The Rolling Stones, Etta James, Van Morrison, Paul Rodgers, Tom Petty and the Heartbreakers, April Wine, Robben Ford, Meat Puppets, Cold Blood, The Sensational Alex Harvey Band, The Righteous Brothers, Johnny Kidd & the Pirates, Chuck Berry, Sam Cooke, Buddy Guy
"I Love the Life I Live, I Live the Life I Love"	Muddy Waters	1956	Willie Nelson, John P. Hammond, Mose Allison, Buddy Guy
"I Want to Be Loved"	Muddy Waters	1955	The Rolling Stones
"I'm a Natural Born Lover"	Muddy Waters	1954	
"I'm Ready"	Muddy Waters	1954	Humble Pie, Buddy Guy, Aerosmith, Long John Baldry, Eric Burdon, George Thorogood, Albert King, John P. Hammond, Carey Bell, The Blues Band, Luther "Guitar Junior" Johnson
"If the Sea Was Whiskey" a.k.a. "Diving Duck Blues" (credited to Sleepy John Estes)	Big Three Trio	1947	Chris Thile and the How to Grow a Band, Taj Mahal, Johnny Winter
"Insane Asylum"	Koko Taylor	1968	Kathi McDonald & Sly Stone, Diamanda Galás, Asylum Street Spankers, The Detroit Cobras, Oxbow & Marianne Faithfull
"It Don't Make Sense (You Can't Make Peace)"	Willie Dixon	1984	Styx
"Let Me Love You Baby"	Buddy Guy	1961	Koko Taylor, Stevie Ray Vaughan, Jeff Beck, Muddy Waters, B.B. King, Mike Farris
"Little Baby"	Howlin' Wolf	1961	The Rolling Stones, The Blues Project, Ant Trip Ceremony, The Ford Blues Band
"Little Red Rooster"	Howlin' Wolf	1961	Sam Cooke, The Rolling Stones, Grateful Dead, The Doors, Luther Allison, The Jesus and Mary Chain, Big Mama Thornton, Tom Petty and the Heartbreakers, Bo Diddley, Otis Rush
"Mellow Down Easy"	Little Walter	1954	Cactus, Paul Butterfield, The Black Crowes, Carey Bell, ZZ Top, Jimmy Reed, Holly Golightly, John P. Hammond, Ford Blues Band
"Mighty Earthquake and Hurricane" a.k.a. "Earthquake and Hurricane"	Willie Dixon	1978	Tina Turner
"Move Me"	Willie Dixon	1959	
"My Babe"	Little Walter	1955	Sonny Boy Williamson, Elvis Presley, The Everly Brothers, Lonnie Mack, Spencer Davis Group, John P. Hammond, Bo Diddley, Muddy Waters, The Remains, Othar Turner, James Cotton, Memphis Slim, Ike & Tina Turner, Ricky Nelson, Gerry and the Pacemakers
"My Baby's Sweeter"	Little Walter	1959	
"My Love Will Never Die"	Big Three Trio	1952	Otis Rush, Magic Sam, Robben Ford, Hozier
"Nervous"	Willie Dixon	1959	André van Duin (as a parody, in Dutch), Ian Whitcomb
"Oh Baby"	Little Walter	1954	
"Pain in My Heart"	Willie Dixon	1955	
"Pretty Thing"	Bo Diddley	1956	Pretty Things, Canned Heat
"The Same Thing"	Muddy Waters	1964	Willie Dixon, George Thorogood, The Allman Brothers Band, Sue Foley, Marc Ford, Grateful Dead, The Band, Louisiana Red, Eddie C. Campbell, Treat Her Right
"The Seventh Son"	Willie Mabon	1956	Mose Allison, Bill Haley, Johnny Rivers, Sting, Climax Blues Band, Long John Baldry, Remo Four, Georgie Fame, John P. Hammond
"Shake for Me"	Howlin' Wolf	1961	Stevie Ray Vaughan, John P. Hammond
"Sittin' and Cryin' the Blues" a.k.a. "Sit and Cry (The Blues)"	Buddy Guy	1958	Willie Dixon
"Spider in My Stew"	Buster Benton	1974	Magic Slim
"Spoonful"	Howlin' Wolf	1960	Muddy Waters, Bo Diddley, Shadows of Knight, Dion, Paul Butterfield, Cream, Canned Heat, Grateful Dead, Ten Years After, The Who, Etta James, Delbert McClinton, Allman Joys, Gil Evans
"Study War No More"	Willie Dixon	1989	
"Talk to Me Baby" a.k.a. "I Can't Hold Out"	Elmore James	1960	Fleetwood Mac, Eric Clapton
"Third Degree"	Eddie Boyd	1953	Willie Dixon, Eric Clapton, Leslie West, Johnny Winter
"Three Hundred Pounds of Joy"	Howlin' Wolf	1963	Tom Jones & Jools Holland, Blues Brothers, Dana Gillespie
"Tollin' Bells"	Lowell Fulson	1956	Savoy Brown, Robert Cray, Paul Butterfield
"Too Late"	Little Walter	1953	Little Milton
"Too Many Cooks"	Jesse Fortune	1961	Buddy Guy, Robert Cray
"Violent Love"	Big Three Trio	1951	Otis Rush, Oingo Boingo, Dr. Feelgood, Skankin' Pickle
"Wang Dang Doodle"	Howlin' Wolf	1960	Koko Taylor, Grateful Dead, Savoy Brown, Box Tops, PJ Harvey, Rufus Thomas, The Pointer Sisters, The Blues Band, Widespread Panic, Warren Zevon, Dave Edmunds, Z.Z. Hill
"Weak Brain, Narrow Mind"	Willie Dixon	1964	Great White, Widespread Panic
"What in the World You Goin' to Do"	John Littlejohn	1968	
"When My Left Eye Jumps"	Buddy Guy	1967	
"When the Lights Go Out"	Jimmy Witherspoon	1954	Kim Wilson
"Whole Lotta Love" (co-credit with Led Zeppelin) (Note: Elements of Dixon's "You Need Love" were incorporated by Led Zeppelin into their recording of "Whole Lotta Love". A lawsuit was settled out of court, resulting in Dixon's name being added alongside the group members on subsequent releases of the song. ISWC T-070.202.109-7.)	Led Zeppelin	1969	Tina Turner, Tori Amos, Ben Harper, Prince, Carlos Santana, Mary J. Blige, Hozier, Candye Kane
"You Can't Judge a Book by the Cover"	Bo Diddley	1962	Shadows of Knight, Cactus, The Yardbirds, Beat Farmers, The Fabulous Thunderbirds, Tim Hardin, The Merseybeats, Elliott Murphy, Long John Baldry, The Monkees, Eric Clapton, Roy Buchanan, Tom Rush, The Rolling Stones, John P. Hammond, Dion DiMucci, Delbert McClinton
"You Know My Love"	Otis Rush	1960	Gary Moore, Anson Funderburgh
"You Need Love"	Muddy Waters	1962	Candye Kane, Savoy Brown, The Small Faces
"You Shook Me"	Muddy Waters	1962	Willie Dixon, Jeff Beck Group, Led Zeppelin, Dread Zeppelin, B.B.King
"You'll Be Mine"	Howlin' Wolf	1961	Stevie Ray Vaughan, Dr. Feelgood, John P. Hammond
"Young Fashioned Ways"	Muddy Waters	1955	Koko Taylor

== Sources ==
- Dixon, Willie; Snowden, Don (1989). I Am the Blues. Da Capo Press. ISBN 0-306-80415-8.
- Eder, Bruce (1996). "Willie Dixon". In Erlewine, Michael (ed.). All Music Guide to the Blues: The Experts' Guide to the Best Blues Recordings. All Music Guide to the Blues. San Francisco: Miller Freeman Books. ISBN 0-87930-424-3.
- Herzhaft, Gerard (1992). "Willie Dixon". Encyclopedia of the Blues. Fayetteville, Arkansas: University of Arkansas Press. ISBN 1-55728-252-8.
- Shadwick, Keith (2007). "Willie Dixon". The Encyclopedia of Jazz & Blues. London: Quantum Publishing. ISBN 978-0-681-08644-9.

== General references ==
- "Willie Dixon – Composer Credits". AllMusic.
- "Willie Dixon, Creator-id: 00008321027". ISWC Network.
