= Too Many Cooks =

Too Many Cooks may refer to:

- Too Many Cooks (novel), a 1938 novel by Rex Stout
- Too Many Cooks (film), a 1931 American film
- Too Many Cooks, a 1914 play by Frank Craven
- "Too Many Cooks" (short), a 2014 Adult Swim short
- Too Many Cooks (TV series), an ITV cookery show
- "Too Many Cooks", a song written by Willie Dixon, originally recorded by Jesse Fortune
- "Too Many Cooks (Spoil the Soup)", a song written by Holland–Dozier–Holland, recorded by 8th Day and Mick Jagger with producer John Lennon
- "Too Many Cooks", a 1989 episode of Shining Time Station
- The idiom "too many cooks spoil the broth", similar to Design by committee
