= Australian Idol season 10 =

Season of television series

Australian Idol
- Season 10
- Hosted by: Ricki-Lee Coulter; Scott Tweedie
- Judges: Kyle Sandilands; Amy Shark; Marcia Hines
- Winner: Marshall Hamburger
- Runner-up: Iilysh Retallick
- Finals venue: Sydney Coliseum Theatre

Release
- Original network: Seven Network
- Original release: 2 February – 7 April 2025

Season chronology
- ← Previous; Season 9 Next → Season 11

- Australian Idol (Season 10)
- Finalists (with dates of elimination)
| Marshall Hamburger | Winner |
| Iliysh Retallick | Runner-up |
| Gisella Colletti | 7 April |
| William Le Brun | 31 March |
| Jaymon Bob | 31 March |
| Jake Whittaker | 31 March |
| Emma Jones | 24 March |
| John Van Beek | 24 March |
| Bony Onynango | 18 March |
| Hannah Waddell | 18 March |
| Aaliyah Duchesne | 11 March |
| Mzuki | 11 March |

The tenth season of Australian Idol premiered on 2 February 2025. This is the third season airing on Seven Network, after they bought the rights to the series from Network 10. The grand final was won by Marshall Hamburger on 7th April 2025.

== Production ==
In June 2024, it was officially revealed that the show had been renewed by Seven Network for a tenth season, set to premiere in 2025. It was revealed that Ricki-Lee and Scott Tweedie would both return as hosts, and Kyle Sandilands, Marcia Hines and Amy Shark would all be returning as judges. Seven later confirmed the 2025 cast at their upfronts on 13 November 2024. Ricki-Lee, Phil Burton and Kate Ceberano filled in for Sandilands on occasions when he was unwell due to recently being diagnosed with a brain aneurism.

== Auditions ==
Auditions were held in various cities around Australia. In a few cases, a single judge visited a remote location to audition contestants by themselves. Like last season, contestants were not guaranteed a "golden ticket" if they got two or three "yes" votes from the judges. Instead, they were sent to a holding area until the end of the day, when the judges would further narrow down the contestants they saw, potentially have some contestants sing again, and decide who made the Top 30.

=== Auditions 1 (2 February) ===
Singers that received a golden ticket
| Singer | Age | Hometown | Song |
|---|---|---|---|
| Iliysh Retallick | 17 | Culcairn, New South Wales | "You Oughta Know" by Alanis Morissette |
| Emma Jones | 23 | Canberra, Australian Capital Territory | "To Love Somebody" by Bee Gees |
| John Van Beek | 18 | Perth, Western Australia | "I Don't Want to Miss a Thing" by Aerosmith |
| William Le Brun | 20 | Melbourne, Victoria | "Feeling Good" by Michael Bublé/ "Blinding Lights" by The Weeknd |
| Geistare Bubenaite | 23 | Para Hills West, South Australia | "Flowers" by Miley Cyrus |

=== Auditions 2 (3 February) ===
Singers that received a golden ticket
| Singer | Age | Hometown | Song |
|---|---|---|---|
| Marshall Hamburger | 19 | Doonan, Queensland | "Every Little Thing She Does Is Magic" by The Police |
| Izellah Connelly | 18 | Southport, Queensland | "Jealous" by Labrinth |
| Jaymon Bob | 22 | Rockhampton, Queensland | "If Tomorrow Never Comes" by Garth Brooks |
| Majeda Beatty | 26 | Castle Hill, New South Wales | "Juice" by Lizzo |

=== Auditions 3 (4 February) ===
Singers that received a golden ticket
| Singer | Age | Hometown | Song |
|---|---|---|---|
| Aaliyah Duchesne | 27 | Prospect, New South Wales | "Angel of Mine" by Monica |
| Jake Whittaker | 29 | Stockleigh, Queensland | "Bohemian Rhapsody" by Queen |
| Clint Posselt | 29 | Mareeba, Queensland | "Black and Gold" by Sam Sparro |
| Dinley Jones | 26 | Sydney, New South Wales | "Classic" by MKTO |

=== Auditions 4 (9 February) ===
Singers that received a golden ticket
| Singer | Age | Hometown | Song |
|---|---|---|---|
| Keely Ellen | 17 | Bundaberg, Queensland | "Always on My Mind" by Willie Nelson |
| Kiedis Solberg | 16 | Busselton, Western Australia | "Use Somebody" by Kings of Leon |
| Shiloh Kayondo | 20 | Annerley, Queensland | "Beneath Your Beautiful" by Labrinth ft Emeli Sandé |
| Gisella Colletti | 17 | Perth, Western Australia | "I Am Changing" by Jennifer Holliday |
| Paxton Smith | 20 | Brisbane, Queensland | "We Don't Need Another Hero" by Tina Turner |

=== Auditions 5 (10 February) ===
Singers that received a golden ticket
| Singer | Age | Hometown | Song |
|---|---|---|---|
| Jinja Blue | 21 | Buddina, Queensland | "Call Me" by Blondie |
| Mzuki | 28 | Melbourne, Victoria | "Get Ur Freak On" by Missy Elliott |
| Jaylena Heuskes | 24 | Adelaide, South Australia | "Senorita" by Justin Timberlake |
| Henry West | 23 | Byron Bay, New South Wales | "Adore" by Amy Shark |

=== Auditions 6 (11 February) ===
Singers that received a golden ticket
| Singer | Age | Hometown | Song |
|---|---|---|---|
| Abbie Ferris | 25 | Mallala, South Australia | "That Don't Impress Me Much" by Shania Twain |
| Chris Ah Gee | 31 | Buddina, Queensland | "Kiss from a Rose" by Seal |
| Jazz Ella | 27 | Buddina, Queensland | "Teenage Dream" by Katy Perry |
| Griffin Morris | 24 | Hawthorne, Queensland | "Blame It On Me" by George Ezra |

=== Auditions 7 (16 February) ===
Singers that received a golden ticket
| Singer | Age | Hometown | Song |
|---|---|---|---|
| Hannah Waddell | 25 | Doubleview, Western Australia | "Never Can Say Goodbye" by The Jackson 5 |
| Hazel Symonds | 16 | Mildura, Victoria | "The One That Got Away" by Katy Perry |
| Liam Barton | 25 | Kingaroy, Queensland | "Wanted Dead or Alive" by Bon Jovi |
| Noah Lagesse | 28 | Spearwood, Western Australia | "Dumb Things" by Paul Kelly |
| Bony Onynango* | 25 | Brisbane, Queensland | "Girls" by The Kid Laroi |

- Bony Onynango originally did not receive a golden ticket, but judge Kyle Sandilands invited him to attend Top 30 week making a Top 31.

== Top 31 ==
=== Top 31 Part 1 (17 February) ===
Singer was Eliminated
Singer got put On Notice

Round 1 – Chorus Line
| Group | Song | Singer | Result |
|---|---|---|---|
| Group 1 | "Youngblood" | Iliysh Retallick | Advanced |
| Group 1 | "Youngblood" | Chris Ah Gee | Advanced |
| Group 1 | "Youngblood" | Dinley Jones | Advanced |
| Group 1 | "Youngblood" | Liam Barton | Eliminated |
| Group 1 | "Youngblood" | William Le Brun | Advanced |
| Group 2 | "True Colors" | Marshall Hamburger | Advanced |
| Group 2 | "True Colors" | Kiedis Solberg | On Notice |
| Group 2 | "True Colors" | Jaymon Bob | Advanced |
| Group 2 | "True Colors" | Henry West | Advanced |
| Group 2 | "True Colors" | Emma Jones | Advanced |
| Group 3 | "God Is a Woman" | Jazz Ella | Advanced |
| Group 3 | "God Is a Woman" | Jinja Blue | On Notice |
| Group 3 | "God Is a Woman" | Aaliyah Duchesne | Advanced |
| Group 3 | "God Is a Woman" | Mzuki | Advanced |
| Group 3 | "God Is a Woman" | Clint Posselt | Advanced |
| Group 3 | "God Is a Woman" | Bony Onynango | Advanced |
| Group 4 | "Don't Start Now" | Paxton Smith | Advanced |
| Group 4 | "Don't Start Now" | Jaylena Heuskes | Advanced |
| Group 4 | "Don't Start Now" | Geistare Bubenaite | Advanced |
| Group 4 | "Don't Start Now" | Hannah Waddell | Advanced |
| Group 4 | "Don't Start Now" | Majeda Beatty | On Notice |
| Group 5 | "Dancing on My Own" | Shiloh Kayondo | Eliminated |
| Group 5 | "Dancing on My Own" | Izellah Connelly | Advanced |
| Group 5 | "Dancing on My Own" | John Van Beek | Advanced |
| Group 5 | "Dancing on My Own" | Hazel Symonds | Advanced |
| Group 5 | "Dancing on My Own" | Gisella Colletti | Advanced |
| Group 6 | "Go Your Own Way" | Jake Whittaker | Advanced |
| Group 6 | "Go Your Own Way" | Keely Ellen | Advanced |
| Group 6 | "Go Your Own Way" | Noah Lagesse | Advanced |
| Group 6 | "Go Your Own Way" | Abbie Ferris | Advanced |
| Group 6 | "Go Your Own Way" | Griffin Morris | Eliminated |

=== Top 31 Part 2 (18 February) ===
Singers was Eliminated
Singers got put On Notice

Round 2 – Group Challenge
| Group | Song | Singer | Result |
|---|---|---|---|
| Group 1 | "Born This Way" | Marshall Hamburger | Advanced |
| Group 1 | "Born This Way" | Iliysh Retallick | Advanced |
| Group 1 | "Born This Way" | Izellah Connelly | Advanced |
| Group 2 | "Dilemma" | Geistare Bubenaite | Eliminated |
| Group 2 | "Dilemma" | Mzuki | Advanced |
| Group 2 | "Dilemma" | Jaylena Heuskes | Advanced |
| Group 3 | "You're Still the One" | Emma Jones | Advanced |
| Group 3 | "You're Still the One" | Jaymon Bob | Advanced |
| Group 3 | "You're Still the One" | Jake Whittaker | Advanced |
| Group 4 | "I Want It That Way" | Aaliyah Duchesne | Advanced |
| Group 4 | "I Want It That Way" | Clint Posselt | Advanced |
| Group 4 | "I Want It That Way" | Dinley Jones | On Notice |
| Group 4 | "I Want It That Way" | Abbie Ferris | On Notice |
| Group 5 | "Firework" | Kiedis Solberg | On Notice |
| Group 5 | "Firework" | Gisella Colletti | Advanced |
| Group 5 | "Firework" | Hazel Symonds | Advanced |
| Group 6 | "Bad Habits" | William Le Brun | On Notice |
| Group 6 | "Bad Habits" | Jazz Ella | Eliminated |
| Group 6 | "Bad Habits" | Bony Onynango | Advanced |
| Group 7 | "Someone You Loved" | Majeda Beatty | On Notice |
| Group 7 | "Someone You Loved" | Henry West | Eliminated |
| Group 7 | "Someone You Loved" | Chris Ah Gee | On Notice |
| Group 8 | "What a Man" | Keely Ellen | Advanced |
| Group 8 | "What a Man" | Paxton Smith | Advanced |
| Group 8 | "What a Man" | Noah Lagesse | Advanced |
| Group 9 | "Ain't No Mountain High Enough" | John Van Beek | On Notice |
| Group 9 | "Ain't No Mountain High Enough" | Jinja Blue | On Notice |
| Group 9 | "Ain't No Mountain High Enough" | Hannah Waddell | Advanced |

- Ricki-Lee guest judged this round filling in for Kyle, who was unavailable for health reasons

=== Top 31 Part 3 (23 & 24 February) ===
Singers was Eliminated
Singers got put On Notice

25 contestants reached this round. Each contestant sang a song solo in front of a live audience. The judges then decided who would progress to the final 21.

| Singer | Order | Song | Result |
|---|---|---|---|
| Marshall Hamburger | 1 | "Hip to Be Square" | Advanced |
| Aaliyah Duchesne | 2 | "Call Out My Name" | Advanced |
| Hannah Waddell | 3 | "Lady Marmalade" | Advanced |
| Jake Whittaker | 4 | "(Everything I Do) I Do It for You" | On Notice |
| Bony Onynango | 5 | "What Do You Mean?" | Advanced |
| Noah Lagesse | 6 | "Fortunate Son" | Eliminated |
| Mzuki | 7 | "Drop It Like It's Hot" | Advanced |
| Chris Ah Gee | 8 | "Cake by the Ocean" | Advanced |
| Emma Jones | 9 | "Lose Control" | Advanced |
| Jaymon Bob | 10 | "Eternal Flame" | Advanced |
| Abbie Ferris | 11 | "Austin" | Eliminated |
| Majeda Beatty | 12 | "Price Tag" | On Notice |
| Gisella Colletti | 13 | "Without You" | Advanced |
| William Le Brun | 14 | "Levitating" | Advanced |
| Hazel Symonds | 15 | "Wrecking Ball" | Advanced |
| Iliysh Retallick | 16 | "Are You Gonna Be My Girl" | On Notice |
| Dinley Jones | 17 | "Treasure" | Advanced |
| Keely Ellen | 18 | "Songbird" | Advanced |
| Izellah Connelly | 19 | "Issues" | Advanced |
| Paxton Smith | 20 | "Bring Me to Life" | Eliminated |
| Jinja Blue | 21 | "Ocean Eyes" | Advanced |
| Jaylena Heuskes | 22 | "Vogue" | Advanced |
| Kiedis Solberg | 23 | "This Town" | Eliminated |
| Clint Posselt | 24 | "Where Is the Love?" | On Notice |
| John Van Beek | 25 | "Bleeding Love" | Advanced |

== Top 21 ==
Over three nights, seven contestants will perform in front of a live audience, by the end of each round four singers will make it through to the top 12. The judges will also each be given one ‘FastPass’ which, whilst not exactly a Touchdown, works like a Golden Buzzer, automatically sending someone into the Top 12.

Singer received a "FastPass" and advanced to the Top 12
Singer did not make the Top 12

=== Top 21 Part 1 (2 March) ===
Singers Top 21 result
| Singer | Order | Song | Result |
|---|---|---|---|
| Marshall Hamburger | 1 | "Bennie and the Jets" | Advanced |
| Aaliyah Duchesne | 2 | "All My Life" | Advanced |
| Jaymon Bob | 3 | "Two Strong Hearts" | Advanced |
| Jake Whittaker | 4 | "Run to Paradise" | Advanced ("FastPass" given by Kyle) |
| Jaylena Heuskes | 5 | "Espresso" | Eliminated |
| Hazel Symonds | 6 | "Chandelier" | Eliminated |
| Clint Posselt | 7 | "Lovin on Me" | Eliminated |

=== Top 21 Part 2 (3 March) ===
Singers Top 21 result
| Singer | Order | Song | Result |
|---|---|---|---|
| Iilysh Retallick | 1 | "Just a Girl" | Advanced |
| Emma Jones | 2 | "I'll Stand By You" | Advanced |
| Bony Onynango | 3 | "Closer" | Advanced |
| John Van Beek | 4 | "Impossible" | Advanced ("FastPass" given by Amy) |
| Dinley Jones | 5 | "DJ Got Us Fallin' in Love" | Eliminated |
| Izellah Connelly | 6 | "Dusk Till Dawn" | Eliminated |
| Majeda Beatty | 7 | "Super Bass" | Eliminated |

=== Top 21 Part 3 (4 March) ===
Singers Top 21 result
| Singer | Order | Song | Result |
|---|---|---|---|
| Hannah Waddell | 1 | "UFO" | Advanced |
| Gisella Colletti | 2 | "How Am I Supposed To Live Without You" | Advanced |
| William Le Brun | 3 | "Something Just Like This" | Advanced ("FastPass" given by Marcia) |
| Keely Ellen | 4 | "The First Cut Is The Deepest" | Eliminated |
| Mzuki | 5 | "U Can't Touch This" | Advanced |
| Chris Ah Gee | 6 | "Like It Like That" | Eliminated |
| Jinja Blue | 7 | "Breathless" | Eliminated |

== Top 12 Finalists ==
=== Marshall Hamburger ===
Marshall Hamburger, is from Doonan, Queensland. He became the tenth winner of Australian Idol on 7 April 2025.

Audition: "Every Little Thing She Does is Magic" (The Police)
Top 31 Part 1: "True Colors" (Cyndi Lauper)
Top 31 Part 2: "Born This Way" (Lady Gaga)
Top 31 Part 3: "Hip To Be Square" (Huey Lewis and The News)
Top 21: "Bennie and the Jets" (Elton John)
Top 12: "The Heat is On" (Glenn Frey) ~ Judges’ Choice
Top 10: "As the Days Go By" (Daryl Braithwaite)
Top 8: "Beautiful Things" (Benson Boone)
Top 6: "Higher Love" (Steve Winwood)
Top 6: Head-to-head: "King of Wishful Thinking" (Go West)
Grand Finale – Top 3: "Playing to Win" (Little River Band)
Grand Finale – Top 3: "You Make Me Feel Like Dancing" (Leo Sayer)
Grand Finale – Top 3: "Shake a Tail Feather" (Five Du-Tones)
Grand Finale – Top 2: "Every Little Thing She Does is Magic" (The Police) – Winner

=== Iilysh Retallick ===
Iilysh Retallick, is from Culcairn, New South Wales. She finished as the runner-up on 7 April 2025.

Audition: "You Oughta Know" (Alanis Morissette)
Top 31 Part 1: "Youngblood" (5 Seconds of Summer)
Top 31 Part 2: "Born This Way" (Lady Gaga)
Top 31 Part 3: "Are You Gonna Be My Girl" (Jet)
Top 21: "Just A Girl" (No Doubt)
Top 12: "Edge of Seventeen" (Stevie Nicks) ~ Judges’ Choice
Top 10: "Sweet but Psycho" (Ava Max)
Top 8: "bad guy" (Billie Eilish)
Top 6: "It's My Life" (Bon Jovi)
Top 6: Head-to-head: "Mr. Brightside" (The Killers)
Grand Finale – Top 3: "Boys in Town" (Divinyls)
Grand Finale – Top 3: "Joker & the Thief" (Wolfmother)
Grand Finale – Top 3: "Good 4 U" (Olivia Rodrigo)
Grand Finale – Top 2: "You Oughta Know" (Alanis Morissette) – Runner-up

=== Gisella Colletti ===
Gisella Colletti, born on 2 April 2008 (age 18) is from Perth, Western Australia. She reached the Grand Finale on 7 April 2025, but was eliminated prior to the final round of performances.

Audition: "I Am Changing" (Jennifer Holliday)
Top 31 Part 1: "Dancing on My Own" (Robyn)
Top 31 Part 2: "Firework" (Katy Perry)
Top 31 Part 3: "Without You" (Badfinger)
Top 21: "How Am I Supposed to Live Without You" (Laura Brannigan)
Top 12: "Defying Gravity" (Idina Menzel and Kristin Chenoweth)
Top 10: "Firework" (Katy Perry) ~ Judges’ Choice
Top 8: "Break Free" (Ariana Grande and Zedd)
Top 6: "Hero" (Mariah Carey)
Top 6: Head-to-head: "All By Myself" (Celine Dion)
Grand Finale – Top 3: "How Will I Know" (Whitney Houston)
Grand Finale – Top 3: "Heaven Help My Heart" (Tina Arena)
Grand Finale – Top 3: "Flashdance... What a Feeling" (Irene Cara) – Eliminated on 7 April

=== William Le Brun ===
William Le Brun, is from Melbourne, Victoria.

Audition: "Feeling Good" (Michael Bublé)/ “Blinding Lights” (The Weeknd)
Top 31 Part 1: "Youngblood" (5 Seconds of Summer)
Top 31 Part 2: "Bad Habits" (Ed Sheeran)
Top 31 Part 3: "Levitating" (Dua Lipa)
Top 21: "Something Just Like This" (The Chainsmokers & Coldplay) ~ FastPass from Marcia Hines
Top 12: "Shallow" (Bradley Cooper and Lady Gaga)
Top 10: "Eagle Rock" (Daddy Cool)
Top 8: "I Said Hi" (Amy Shark)
Top 6: "Happy" (Pharrell Williams)
Top 6: Head-to-head: "High Hopes" (Panic! at the Disco) – Eliminated on 31 March

=== Jaymon Bob ===
Jaymon Bob, is from Rockhampton, Queensland.

Audition: "If Tomorrow Never Comes" (Garth Brooks)
Top 31 Part 1: "True Colors" (Cyndi Lauper)
Top 31 Part 2: "You're Still The One" (Shania Twain)
Top 31 Part 3: "Eternal Flame" (Bangles)
Top 21: "Two Strong Hearts" (John Farnham)
Top 12: "Love Is All Around" (The Troggs)
Top 10: "You're Beautiful" (James Blunt)
Top 8: "Drops of Jupiter" (Train)
Top 8 – Bottom 4: "Castle on the Hill" (Ed Sheeran)
Top 6: "My Island Home" (Warumpi Band)
Top 6: Head-to-head: "Circles" (Post Malone) – Eliminated on 31 March

=== Jake Whittaker ===
Jake Whittaker, is from Stockleigh, Queensland.

Audition: "Bohemian Rhapsody" (Queen)
Top 31 Part 1: "Go Your Own Way" (Fleetwood Mac)
Top 31 Part 2: "You're Still The One" (Shania Twain)
Top 31 Part 3: "(Everything I Do) I Do It for You" (Bryan Adams)
Top 21: "Run To Paradise" (The Choirboys) ~ FastPass from Kyle Sandilands
Top 12: "Stayin' Alive" (Bee Gees)
Top 10: "Day Drunk" (Morgan Evans)
Top 10 – Bottom 2: "The Best" (Tina Turner)
Top 8: "Raise Your Glass" (P!nk)
Top 8 – Bottom 4: "Old Time Rock and Roll" (Bob Seger)
Top 6: "Thinking Out Loud" (Ed Sheeran)
Top 6: Head-to-head: "Hurts So Good" (John Mellencamp) – Eliminated on 31 March

=== Emma Jones ===
Emma Jones, is from Canberra, Australian Capital Territory.

Audition: "To Love Somebody" (Bee Gees)
Top 31 Part 1: "True Colors" (Cyndi Lauper)
Top 31 Part 2: "You're Still the One" (Shania Twain)
Top 31 Part 3: "Lose Control" (Teddy Swims)
Top 21: "I'll Stand By You" (The Pretenders)
Top 12: "Iris" (Goo Goo Dolls)
Top 10: "Heaven Is a Place on Earth" (Belinda Carlisle) ~ Judges’ Choice
Top 8: "It Must Have Been Love" (Roxette)
Top 8 – Bottom 4: "Fields of Gold" (Sting) – Eliminated on 24 March

=== John Van Beek ===
John Van Beek, is from Perth, Western Australia.

Audition: "I Don't Wanna Miss A Thing" (Aerosmith)
Top 31 Part 1: "Dancing On My Own" (Robyn)
Top 31 Part 2: "Ain't No Mountain High Enough" (Marvin Gaye & Tammi Terrell)
Top 31 Part 3: "Bleeding Love" (Leona Lewis)
Top 21: "Impossible" (James Arthur) ~ FastPass from Amy Shark
Top 12: "A Thousand Years" (Christina Perri)
Top 10: "2 Become 1" (Spice Girls)
Top 10 – Bottom 2: "Breakeven" (The Script)
Top 8: "Ghost" (Justin Bieber)
Top 8 – Bottom 4: "You Are the Reason" (Calum Scott) – Eliminated on 24 March

=== Bony Onynango ===
Bony Onynango, is from Brisbane, Queensland.

Audition: "Girls" (The Kid LAROI)
Top 31 Part 1: "God Is a Woman" (Ariana Grande)
Top 31 Part 2: "Bad Habits" (Ed Sheeran)
Top 31 Part 3: "What Do You Mean?" (Justin Bieber)
Top 21: "Closer" (Ne-Yo)
Top 12: "All Star" (Smash Mouth)
Top 12 – Bottom 2: "Down" (Jay Sean)
Top 10: "This City" (Sam Fischer)
Top 10 – Bottom 2: "I Don't Care" (Ed Sheeran and Justin Bieber) – Eliminated on 18 March

=== Hannah Waddell ===
Hannah Waddell, is from Doubleview, Western Australia.

Audition: "Never Can Say Goodbye" (The Jackson 5)
Top 31 Part 1: "Don't Start Now" (Dua Lipa)
Top 31 Part 2: "Ain’t No Mountain High Enough" (Marvin Gaye & Tammi Terrell)
Top 31 Part 3: "Lady Marmalade" (Labelle)
Top 21: "UFO" (Sneaky Sound System)
Top 12: "Dance the Night" (Dua Lipa)
Top 12 – Bottom 2: "Heart of Glass" (Blondie)
Top 10: "Good Luck, Babe!" (Chappell Roan)
Top 10 – Bottom 2: "I Will Survive" (Gloria Gaynor) – Eliminated on 18 March

=== Aaliyah Duchesne ===
Aaliyah Duchesne, is from Prospect, New South Wales.

Audition: "Angel of Mine" (Monica)
Top 31 Part 1: "God Is a Woman" (Ariana Grande)
Top 31 Part 2: "I Want It That Way" (Backstreet Boys)
Top 31 Part 3: "Call Out My Name" (The Weeknd)
Top 21: "All My Life" (K-Ci & JoJo)
Top 12: "Time After Time" (Cyndi Lauper)
Top 12 – Bottom 2: "Who's Lovin' You" (The Jackson 5) – Eliminated on 11 March

=== Mzuki ===
Mzuki, is from Melbourne, Victoria.

Audition: "Get Ur Freak On" (Missy Elliott)
Top 31 Part 1: "God Is a Woman" (Ariana Grande)
Top 31 Part 2: "Dilemma" (Nelly ft. Kelly Rowland)
Top 31 Part 3: "Drop It Like It’s Hot" (Snoop Dogg ft. Pharrell Williams)
Top 21: "U Can’t Touch This" (MC Hammer)
Top 12: "Gangsta's Paradise" (Coolio featuring L.V.)
Top 12 – Bottom 2: "Players" (Coi Leray) – Eliminated on 11 March

== Group/guest performances ==
| Week | Performer(s) | Title |
|---|---|---|
| Top 12 | Top 12 with Marcia Hines | "I've Got the Music in Me" |
| Top 12 | Top 12 | "Listen to the Music" |
| Top 10 | Top 10 | "Praising You" |
| Top 8 | Top 8 | "Come Together" |
| Top 8 | Dylan Wright | "Mess of a Man" |
| Top 6 | Ronan Keating | "Lovin' Each Day" |
| Top 6 | Top 6 | "There's Nothing Holdin' Me Back" |
| Top 6 | Jessica Mauboy | "I'm Sorry" |
| Top 3 | Casey Donovan and Marcia Hines | "She Works Hard for the Money" |
| Top 3 | Top 12 | "Unwritten" |
| Top 3 | Guy Sebastian | "Maybe" |

== Weekly Song Themes ==
| Date | Week | Theme |
|---|---|---|
| 9–11 March | Top 12 | Movie Week |
| 16–18 March | Top 10 | Superstar Week |
| 23–24 March | Top 8 | Viewer's Choice |
| 30–31 March | Top 6 | Heroes & Tributes |
| 6–7 April | Top 3 | Solos & Celebrity Duets |

== Live performances ==
During each round of the live performances, each contestant sings a song with a given theme. After all contestants have sung, the judges choose one contestant to directly advance to the next stage; then, the public is given approximately 24 hours to vote for their favourite singers. During the results night, after voting has closed, the four contestants with the fewest votes sing again—in pairs. The singer with the lowest number of votes, per each pair, is eliminated from the competition.

=== Top 12 (9–11 March) ===
Singer received immunity and advanced to the next stage
Singer was in the bottom two/four
Singer was eliminated

Singers Top 12 Result
| Singer | Order | Song | Movie | Result |
Live Acts Night 1
| Jake Whittaker | 1 | "Stayin' Alive" | "Saturday Night Fever" | Safe |
| Iilysh Retallick | 2 | "Edge of Seventeen" | "School of Rock" | Judges' Vote |
| Bony Onynango | 3 | "All Star" | "Shrek" | Bottom 2 |
| Emma Jones | 4 | "Iris" | "City of Angels" | Safe |
| Mzuki | 5 | "Gangsta's Paradise" | "Dangerous Minds" | Bottom 2 |
| Gisella Colletti | 6 | "Defying Gravity" | "Wicked" | Safe |
Live Acts Night 2
| Marshall Hamburger | 1 | "The Heat is On" | "Beverly Hills Cop" | Judges' Vote |
| Aaliyah Duchesne | 2 | "Time After Time" | "Strictly Ballroom" | Bottom 2 |
| William Le Brun | 3 | "Shallow" | "A Star is Born" | Safe |
| John Van Beek | 4 | "A Thousand Years" | "The Twilight Saga: Breaking Dawn – Part 1" | Safe |
| Hannah Waddell | 5 | "Dance the Night" | "Barbie" | Bottom 2 |
| Jaymon Bob | 6 | "Love Is All Around" | "Love Actually" | Safe |
Songs on results night
Pair 1
| Bony Onynango | 1 | "Down" | | Safe |
| Mzuki | 2 | "Players" | | Eliminated |
Pair 2
| Aaliyah Duchesne | 1 | "Who's Lovin' You" | | Eliminated |
| Hannah Waddell | 2 | "Heart of Glass" | | Safe |

=== Top 10 (16–18 March) ===
Singers Top 10 Result
| Singer | Order | Song | Chosen by | Result |
Live Acts Night 1
| Gisella Colletti | 1 | "Firework" | Katy Perry | Judges' Vote |
| Jake Whittaker | 2 | "Day Drunk" | Morgan Evans | Bottom 2 |
| Marshall Hamburger | 3 | "As the Days Go By" | Daryl Braithwaite | Safe |
| Hannah Waddell | 4 | "Good Luck, Babe!" | Cast of Home and Away | Bottom 2 |
| Jaymon Bob | 5 | "You're Beautiful" | James Blunt | Safe |
Live Acts Night 2
| Iilysh Retallick | 1 | "Sweet but Psycho" | Ava Max | Safe |
| John Van Beek | 2 | "2 Become 1" | Emma Bunton | Bottom 2 |
| William Le Brun | 3 | "Eagle Rock" | Basil Zempilas | Safe |
| Bony Onynango | 4 | "This City" | Sam Fischer | Bottom 2 |
| Emma Jones | 5 | "Heaven Is a Place on Earth" | Belinda Carlisle | Judges' Vote |
Songs on results night
Pair 1
| Jake Whittaker | 1 | "The Best" | | Safe |
| Hannah Waddell | 2 | "I Will Survive" | | Eliminated |
Pair 2
| John Van Beek | 1 | "Breakeven" | | Safe |
| Bony Onynango | 2 | "I Don't Care" | | Eliminated |

- Human Nature's Phil Burton and Kate Ceberano filled in for Kyle on 16th and 17th respectively, who was unavailable for health reasons.

=== Top 8 (23–24 March) ===
Singers Top 8 result
| Singer | Order | Song | Result |
|---|---|---|---|
| Jake Whittaker | 1 | "Raise Your Glass" | Bottom 4 |
| Iilysh Retallick | 2 | "bad guy" | Safe |
| Jaymon Bob | 3 | "Drops of Jupiter (Tell Me)" | Bottom 4 |
| Gisella Colletti | 4 | "Break Free" | Safe |
| John Van Beek | 5 | "Ghost" | Bottom 4 |
| William Le Brun | 6 | "I Said Hi" | Safe |
| Emma Jones | 7 | "It Must Have Been Love" | Bottom 4 |
| Marshall Hamburger | 8 | "Beautiful Things" | Safe |
Songs on results night
| Jake Whittaker | 1 | "Old Time Rock and Roll" | Safe |
| Jaymon Bob | 2 | "Castle on the Hill" | Safe |
| John Van Beek | 3 | "You Are the Reason" | Eliminated |
| Emma Jones | 4 | "Fields of Gold" | Eliminated |

=== Top 6 (30–31 March) ===
Each contestant performs a song on live performance night. The judges opted not to put any singer directly into the Grand Finale, meaning that all results would be decided by the public vote. On results night, after voting has closed, the contestants will each sing again. After each pair of contestants sing, the results will be announced for those two singers: one eliminated, and one put through to the Grand Finale, three in total.

Singers Top 6 result
| Singer | Order | Song | Song dedicated to | Result |
|---|---|---|---|---|
| William Le Brun | 1 | "Happy" | His family | —N/a |
| Iilysh Retallick | 2 | "It's My Life" | Her hometown | —N/a |
| Marshall Hamburger | 3 | "Higher Love" | His parents | —N/a |
| Jake Whittaker | 4 | "Thinking Out Loud" | His wife and son | —N/a |
| Jaymon Bob | 5 | "My Island Home" | His hometown | —N/a |
| Gisella Colletti | 6 | "Hero" | Her family | —N/a |
Songs on results night
| Iilysh Retallick | Pair 1 | "Mr. Brightside" | | Safe |
| Jake Whittaker | Pair 1 | "Hurts So Good" | | Eliminated |
| Jaymon Bob | Pair 2 | "Circles" | | Eliminated |
| Gisella Colletti | Pair 2 | "All By Myself" | | Safe |
| William Le Brun | Pair 3 | "High Hopes" | | Eliminated |
| Marshall Hamburger | Pair 3 | "King of Wishful Thinking" | | Safe |

=== Grand Finale (6–7 April) ===
Winner
Runner-Up
Eliminated

==== Performance night ====
| Singer | Order | Solo | Order | Celebrity Duet (listed in bold) | Result |
|---|---|---|---|---|---|
| Marshall Hamburger | 1 | "Playing to Win" | 6 | "You Make Me Feel Like Dancing" with **Leo Sayer** | **Winner** |
| Iliysh Retallick | 2 | "Boys in Town" | 4 | "Joker & the Thief" with **Wolfmother** | Runner-Up |
| Gisella Colletti | 3 | "How Will I Know" | 5 | "Heaven Help My Heart" with **Tina Arena** | Eliminated |

==== Results night ====
| Singer | Order | Free Choice | Order | Audition Song | Result |
|---|---|---|---|---|---|
| Gisella Colletti | 1 | "Flashdance... What a Feeling" | N/A | (Already Eliminated) | Eliminated |
| Iilysh Retallick | 2 | "Good 4 U" | 4 | "You Oughta Know" | Runner-Up |
| Marshall Hamburger | 3 | "Shake A Tail Feather" | 5 | "Every Little Thing She Does is Magic" | **Winner** |

== Elimination chart ==
| Females | Males | Top 21 | Top 12 | Top 12 "FastPass" | Winner |

| Did Not Perform | Safe | Bottom 2/4 | Judges’ Vote | Eliminated |

| Stage: | | Top 21 | | | Finals | | | | |
| Week: | | 2/3 | 3/3 | 4/3 | 11/3 | 18/3 | 24/3 | 31/3 | 7/4 |
| Place | Contestant | Result | | | | | | | |
| 1 | Marshall Hamburger | Top 12 | | | Top 10 | | | | Winner |
| 2 | Iilysh Retallick | | Top 12 | | Top 10 | | | | Runner-up |
| 3 | Gisella Colletti | | | Top 12 | | Top 8 | | | Eliminated |
| 4-6 | William Le Brun | | | Top 12 | | | | Eliminated | |
| 4-6 | Jaymon Bob | Top 12 | | | | | Bottom 4 | Eliminated | |
| 4-6 | Jake Whittaker | Top 12 | | | | Bottom 2 (16/3) | Bottom 4 | Eliminated | |
| 7-8 | Emma Jones | | Top 12 | | | Top 8 | Eliminated | | |
| 7-8 | John Van Beek | | Top 12 | | | Bottom 2 (17/3) | Eliminated | | |
| 9-10 | Bony Onynango | | Top 12 | | Bottom 2 (9/3) | Eliminated | | | |
| 9-10 | Hannah Waddell | | | Top 12 | Bottom 2 (10/3) | Eliminated | | | |
| 11-12 | Aaliyah Duchesne | Top 12 | | | Eliminated | | | | |
| 11-12 | Mzuki | | | Top 12 | Eliminated | | | | |
| Top 21 (Part 3) | Keely Ellen | | | Eliminated | | | | | |
| Top 21 (Part 3) | Chris Ah Gee | | | Eliminated | | | | | |
| Top 21 (Part 3) | Jinja Blue | | | Eliminated | | | | | |
| Top 21 (Part 2) | Izellah Connelly | | Eliminated | | | | | | |
| Top 21 (Part 2) | Dinley Jones | | Eliminated | | | | | | |
| Top 21 (Part 2) | Majeda Beatty | | Eliminated | | | | | | |
| Top 21 (Part 1) | Hazel Symonds | Eliminated | | | | | | | |
| Top 21 (Part 1) | Clint Posselt | Eliminated | | | | | | | |
| Top 21 (Part 1) | Jaylena Heuskes | Eliminated | | | | | | | |

== Ratings ==
On 28 January 2024, OzTAM’s rating data recording system changed. Viewership data will now focus on National reach and National total ratings instead of the 5 metro centres and overnight shares.

| Episode | | Original airdate | Timeslot | National reach viewers (millions) | National total viewers (millions) | Night rank | Source |
|---|---|---|---|---|---|---|---|
| 1 | "Auditions" | 2 February 2025 | Sunday 7:00 pm | 2.256 | 1.030 | 2 | |
| 2 | "Auditions" | 3 February 2025 | Monday 7:30 pm | 1.789 | 0.818 | 6 | |
| 3 | "Auditions" | 4 February 2025 | Tuesday 7:30 pm | 1.738 | 0.764 | 6 | |
| 4 | "Auditions" | 9 February 2025 | Sunday 7:00 pm | 2.287 | 0.971 | 2 | |
| 5 | "Auditions" | 10 February 2025 | Monday 7:30 pm | 1.708 | 0.847 | 6 | |
| 6 | "Auditions" | 11 February 2025 | Tuesday 7:30 pm | 1.533 | 0.759 | 6 | |
| 7 | "Auditions" | 16 February 2025 | Sunday 7:00 pm | 2.105 | 0.930 | 3 | |
| 8 | "Top 31" | 17 February 2025 | Monday 7:30 pm | 1.565 | 0.823 | 6 | |
| 9 | "Top 31" | 18 February 2025 | Tuesday 7:30 pm | 1.688 | 0.873 | 5 | |
| 10 | "Top 31" | 23 February 2025 | Sunday 7:00 pm | 1.936 | 0.986 | 5 | |
| 11 | "Top 31" | 24 February 2025 | Monday 7:30 pm | 1.705 | 0.920 | 6 | |
| 12 | "Top 21" | 2 March 2025 | Sunday 7:00 pm | 2.035 | 1.006 | 5 | |
| 13 | "Top 21" | 3 March 2025 | Monday 7:30 pm | 1.715 | 0.886 | 5 | |
| 14 | "Top 21" | 4 March 2025 | Tuesday 7:30 pm | 1.829 | 0.862 | 5 | |
| 15 | "Top 12" | 9 March 2025 | Sunday 7:00 pm | 2.106 | 0.987 | 4 | |
| 16 | "Top 12" | 10 March 2025 | Monday 7:30 pm | 1.731 | 0.883 | 5 | |
| 17 | "Top 12" | 11 March 2025 | Tuesday 7:30 pm | 1.408 | 0.808 | 7 | |
| 18 | "Top 10" | 16 March 2025 | Sunday 7:00 pm | 1.929 | 1.000 | 5 | |
| 19 | "Top 10" | 17 March 2025 | Monday 7:30 pm | 1.570 | 0.916 | 6 | |
| 20 | "Top 10" | 18 March 2025 | Tuesday 7:30 pm | 1.468 | 0.876 | 6 | |
| 21 | "Top 8" | 23 March 2025 | Sunday 7:00 pm | 1.975 | 0.966 | 6 | |
| 22 | "Top 8" | 24 March 2025 | Monday 7:30 pm | 1.554 | 0.906 | 5 | |
| 23 | "Top 6" | 30 March 2025 | Sunday 7:00 pm | 2.224 | 1.067 | 5 | |
| 24 | "Top 6" | 31 March 2025 | Monday 7:30 pm | 1.641 | 1.022 | 5 | |
| 25 | "Grand Finale" | 6 April 2025 | Sunday 7:00 pm | 2.217 | 1.073 | 4 | |
| 26 | "Grand Finale" | 7 April 2025 | Monday 7:30 pm | 1.847 | 1.074 | 5 | |
