= One-derful Records =

- Founded: 1962
- Founder: George Leaner
- Defunct: 1968
- Status: Defunct
- Genre: R&B, soul
- Country of origin: United States
- Location: Chicago, Illinois, U.S.

One-derful Records was an independent R&B and soul label based in Chicago. Founded by George Leaner (June 1, 1917 – September 18, 1983) in 1962, One-derful was one of the few black-owned labels in Chicago until its demise in 1968. The label is most known for the release of "Shake a Tail Feather" by the Five Du-Tones in 1963. Other artist on the label included the Sharpees, McKinley Mitchell, Alvin Cash, and Harold Burrage. A few subsidiary labels were launched: Mar-V-Lus, M-Pac, Halo, and Midas Records.

== History ==
A native of Mississippi, George Leaner relocated to Chicago with his family. His uncle, Al Benson, became an influential disc jockey in Chicago. After serving in the army during World War II, Leaner began working at sister's Groove Record Shop and became an assistant to blues producer Lester Melrose in 1946. In 1947, Leaner and his brother Ernie Leaner (1921 – 1990) joined M.S. Distributors and two years later Chord Distributing Company. In 1950, they went into recording, producing Little Walter and Muddy Waters at Monroe Passis' Parkway Records. That year, Ernie founded a distribution company, United Distributors, which George worked at as a junior partner in the operation.

George Leaner launched One-derful in 1962 after McKinley Mitchell brought him a demo. Leaner created an A&R and production team with songwriter Andre Williams who he met working at United and musician Monk Higgins. He hired writers Otis Hayes, Eddie Silvers, and Larry Nestor. Along with creating the label, there was also a studio, Tone Recordings, in the One-derful building at 1827 S. Michigan Ave. United Distribution, which handled records from not only One-derful but other local and national labels, was located in the building as well. Musicians who recorded at the studio include Mighty Joe Young, Syl Johnson, Lonnie Brooks and the Jackson 5 recorded. Larry Blasingaine and his band Larry & the Hippies were the backing band for many One-derful sessions.

The label's debut single "The Town I Live In" by McKinley Mitchell reached No. 8 on the R&B chart. The next year, "Shake a Tail Feather" by the Five Du-Tones reached No. 51 on the Billboard Hot 100 and No. 28 on the Hot R&B Singles chart. Despite having some chart success, many of the artists on the label didn't receive royalties and the label struggled to generate profits. Attempting to capitalize off the Five Du-Tones popularity, a Five Du-Tones Revue Tour was formed which included the Du-Ettes, the Exciters, and Johnny Sayles, but it was not financially successful. After the label folded in 1968, Ernie Leaner and his nephew Tony Leaner formed the short-lived Toddlin' Town Records.

After Ernie Leaner died in 1990, his children inherited One-derful and its assets. They have organized and maintained an archive of more than 700 masters. One of those master's is a rare 1963 recording of "A Wonderful Thing (Love)" by a band called the Rockmasters. They included Eddie Levert who went on to become an R&B sensation with the 1970s and 1980s era trio, the O'Jays. After Michael Jackson's death in 2009, they discovered a master of the Jackson 5's recording of "I'm a Big Boy Now" ("Big Boy") from a July 1967 session which predated their Steeltown recording of "Big Boy" in November 1967.

== Selected discography ==
Catalog No.	Release date	Single (A-side, B-side)	US	US R&B	Artist	Notes
4804	Jan 1962	A: "The Town I Live In"	115	8	McKinley Mitchell	Billboard review (Feb 10, 1962)
4804	Jan 1962	B: "No Love Like My Love"	115	8	McKinley Mitchell	Billboard review (Feb 10, 1962)
4806	Mar 1962	A: "I'll Be There"			Betty Everett	Cash Box review (Mar 31, 1962)
4806	Mar 1962	B: "Your Love Is Important to Me"			Betty Everett	Cash Box review (Mar 31, 1962)
4807	May 1962	A: "Come Back Home"			Benny Turner	Cash Box review (May 19, 1962)
4807	May 1962	B: "When I'm Gone"			Benny Turner	Cash Box review (May 19, 1962)
4815	Mar 1963	A: "Shake A Tail Feather"	51	28	The Five Du-Tones	Cash Box review (Mar 30, 1963)
4815	Mar 1963	B: "Divorce Court"	51	28	The Five Du-Tones	Cash Box review (Mar 30, 1963)
4827	Jul 1964	A: "Please Forgive Me"			Du-Ettes	Cash Box review (Aug 1, 1964)
4827	Jul 1964	B: "Lonely Days"			Du-Ettes	Cash Box review (Aug 1, 1964)
4834	Jun 1965	A: "A Flame In Your Heart"			Otis Clay	
4834	Jun 1965	B: "Three Is a Crowd"			Otis Clay	
4835	Jul 1965	A: "Do The 45"	117		The Sharpees	reached No. 40 on Cash Box R&B chart
4835	Jul 1965	B: "Make Up Your Mind"	117		The Sharpees	reached No. 40 on Cash Box R&B chart
4839	Oct 1965	A: "Tired Of Being Lonely"			The Sharpees	reached No. 90 on Cash Box Top 100 chart
4839	Oct 1965	B: "Just to Please You"			The Sharpees	reached No. 90 on Cash Box Top 100 chart
4841	Mar 1966	A: "I'm Satisfied"	105		Otis Clay	
4841	Mar 1966	B: "I Testify"	105		Otis Clay	
4847	Apr 1967	A: "One Man's Poison"			Liz Lands	
4847	Apr 1967	B: "Don't Shut Me Out"			Liz Lands	
4848	Jul 1967	A: "That's How It Is (When You're In Love)"	131	34	Otis Clay	
4848	Jul 1967	B: "Show Place"	131	34	Otis Clay	
4850	Nov 1967	A: "A Lasting Love"		48	Otis Clay	
4850	Nov 1967	B: "Got to Find a Way"		48	Otis Clay	
