= Marshall Hamburger =

Australian singer and pianist

- Born: 10 May 2005 (age 21)
- Origin: Doonan, Queensland, Australia
- Genres: Rock; pop
- Occupations: Singer; songwriter; pianist
- Instruments: Vocals; piano
- Years active: 2025–present

Marshall Hamburger (born 10 May 2005) is an Australian singer, songwriter and pianist who won the tenth season of Australian Idol in 2025. He officially won the title in April 2025, taking home the $100,000 prize and recording studio package with Hive Sound Studios.

== Early life ==
Hamburger grew up in Doonan, Queensland. His parents were musicians and he was subsequently exposed to performing from an early age.

== Career ==
=== 2025: Australian Idol ===
In 2025, Hamburger auditioned for the tenth season of Seven Network's singing competition Australian Idol. His audition performance of "Every Little Thing She Does Is Magic" by The Police impressed the judges who gave him the nickname "Burger Boy". He received a golden ticket through to the Top 30.

Hamburger continued to impress the judges through the transformation stages of the competition, before advancing through to the top 12 live shows.

Hamburger was announced as a grand finalist for the show on 31 March 2025. Upon hearing the news, he said, "I feel it in my bones, mate. I feel it in my bones." In the final, Hamburger performed a duet with Leo Sayer on the song "You Make Me Feel Like Dancing".

Hamburger was officially revealed to be the winner on 7 April 2025. After his win he said, "Thank you, Australia. Thank you so much. You're gonna hear a lot of me in the future. I'll be out there."

Australian Idol performances and results
| Round | | Song | Original artist | Result |
|---|---|---|---|---|
| Auditions | | "Every Little Thing She Does Is Magic" | The Police | Through to top 30 |
| Top 31 | Chorus Line | "True Colours" | Cyndi Lauper | Advanced |
| Top 31 | Group Challenge | "Born This Way" | Lady Gaga | Advanced |
| Top 31 | Solo | "Hip To Be Square" | Huey Lewis and the News | Through to top 21 |
| Top 21 | | "Bennie and the Jets" | Elton John | Through to top 12 |
| Top 12 | | "The Heat Is On" | Glenn Frey | Judge save to top 10 |
| Top 10 | | "As The Days Go By" | Daryl Braithwaite | Through to top 8 |
| Top 8 | | "Beautiful Things" | Benson Boone | Through to top 6 |
| Top 6 | Performance 1 | "Higher Love" | Steve Winwood | Through to Grand Finale |
| Top 6 | Performance 2 | "Kings Of Wishful Thinking" | Go West | Through to Grand Finale |
| Grand Finale | Solo | "Playing to Win" | Little River Band | Through to top 2 |
| Grand Finale | Celebrity Duet | "You Make Me Feel Like Dancing" with Leo Sayer | Leo Sayer | Through to top 2 |
| Grand Finale | Solo | "Shake A Tail Feather" | Five Du-Tones | Through to top 2 |
| Grand Finale | Audition song | "Every Little Thing She Does Is Magic" | The Police | Winner |

The day after his win, Hamburger's The Idol Collection album was released, featuring all the songs he performed on the show. The album debuted at number 50 on the ARIA Album chart.

== Discography ==
=== Studio albums ===
| Title | Details | Peak chart positions |
| Title | Details | AUS |
|---|---|---|
| The Idol Collection | Released: April 2024; Label: 19 Recordings | 50 |

| Preceded by Dylan Wright | Australian Idol; Winner; Season 10 (2025) | Succeeded by Kesha Oayda |
