= Yambo Records =

Recording label

- Founded: 1960s
- Founder: Willie Dixon
- Status: Defunct
- Distributor: Summit
- Genre: Blues
- Country of origin: U.S.
- Location: Chicago, Illinois

Yambo Records was a blues record label based in Chicago, Illinois. It was founded by arranger and composer Willie Dixon in the late 1960s after he left Chess Records. Yambo Records also had two subsidiary labels, Spoonful and Supreme. The label was based at 7711 South Racine Avenue in Chicago, along with Dixon's related companies Blues Factory and Soul Productions. It was distributed by Summit Distributors in Skokie, Illinois. Dixon recorded and released his 1971 album Peace? on Yambo. He also released several singles, including the hit "1, 2, 3, 4" by five-year-old Lucky Peterson. The label closed in the mid-1970s.

== Discography ==
=== Albums ===
Year	Artist	Title	Number	Notes
1970	E. Rodney Jones	Might is Right!	77701	side 1
1970	Lafayette Leake Trio	Soul Wrinkles	77701	side 2
1971	Willie Dixon	Willie Dixon's Peace?	77715	also numbered 77716

=== Singles ===
Year	Artist	Titles	Number	Notes
1970	Koko Taylor	"A Mighty Love" / "Instant Everything"	107/108	with the Mighty Joe Young Band
1970	Margie Evans	"29 Ways" / "When I Make Love"	109/1010	with the Chicago Blues All Stars
1971	Honey Duo Twins	"Come On Baby" / "Kiss Me"	8915-01 A/B	with the Chicago Blues All Stars
1971	Lucky Peterson	"1, 2, 3, 4" / "Good Old Candy"	777-03/04	with the Lucky Peterson Blues Band
1971	James Peterson	"All On Account of You" / "Sing the Blues Till I Die"	777-05/06	with the Lucky Peterson Blues Band
1972	Quantrells	"Can't Let You Break My Heart" / "Show Me the Game of Love"	T-15	compiled on the CD Home Schooled: The ABCs of Kid Soul, The Numero Group NUM016, 2007
1972?	Modern Times	"Baby Just Maby" (sic) / "Why Must I Live Such a Lonely Life"	777-12/13	
1973	Willie Dixon	"You Got to Move" / "Petting the Baby"	777-14/15	with the Chicago Blues All Stars
1973	Satagans	"Smokin" / "Lovers to Friends"	777-110/111	
1974	McKinley Mitchell	"That Last Home Run" / "All Star Bougee" (instrumental)	777-20/21	with the Chicago Blues All Stars
1974	Jay Jay Taylor	"I'm Not Tired Yet" / "Tell Me the Truth"	1011A/B	listed on label as 'J. Taylor'
1974	Buster Benton	"Spider in my Stew" / "Dangerous Woman"	Supreme 1004/1005	with the Chicago Blues All Stars
1974	McKinley Mitchell	"Good Time Baby" / "All Star Bougee" (instrumental)	Spoonful 777-26	with the Chicago Blues All Stars

== See also ==
- List of record labels
