= Mighty Earthquake and Hurricane =

Studio album by Willie Dixon
- Released: 1984
- Studios: Universal, Chicago, Illinois
- Genre: Blues
- Length: 32:05
- Label: Pausa
- Producer: Willie Dixon

Willie Dixon chronology
What Happened to My Blues (1976)	Mighty Earthquake and Hurricane (1984)	Willie Dixon: Live (Backstage Access) (1985)

Mighty Earthquake and Hurricane is an album by the American blues musician Willie Dixon, released in 1984 by Pausa Records. It was his first album since What Happened to My Blues, in 1976. Dixon supported the album with a North American tour.

== Production ==
The album was recorded in California, with most of it finished by 1982. Dixon is backed by his Chicago All-Stars. Dixon wrote and produced all of the songs on the album. Typical of Dixon's writing, the album addresses topical issues such as religious dogma ("Pie in the Sky") and nuclear war ("It Don't Make Sense (You Can't Make Peace)"). Dixon called the latter song his favorite of all the ones that he had written.

== Critical reception ==
Professional ratings
Review scores
Source	Rating
AllMusic	3/5 stars
The Encyclopedia of Popular Music	3/5 stars
Quad-City Times	B−

The Globe and Mail wrote that "the music, with the honky-tonk flourishes of piano player Lafayette Leak, and the solemn wail of harmonica player Billy Branch, is consistently engaging." The Quad-City Times opined that the album "lacks the reckless spontaneity of his better groups." Cash Box called it "a fine album from an American original."

AllMusic's Bill Dahl deemed Mighty Earthquake and Hurricane a "decent modern album by the prolific legend."

== Cover versions ==
Tina Turner had been performing a cover of the title track as part of her live set. "Flamin' Mamie" was covered by Koko Taylor on Queen of the Blues, released in 1985.

== Track listing ==
All tracks are written by Willie Dixon.

Side one
No.	Title	Length
1.	"Earthquake and Hurricane"	4:20
2.	"It Don't Make Sense (You Can't Make Peace)"	4:25
3.	"After Five Long Years"	3:43
4.	"Everything's Got a Time"	4:13

Side two
No.	Title	Length
1.	"Wigglin' Worm"	3:35
2.	"Flamin' Mamie"	4:01
3.	"Grave Digger Blues"	4:04
4.	"Pie in the Sky"	3:44
Total length:		32:05
