= There'll Come a Time =

Studio album by Betty Everett
- Released: 1969
- Genre: R&B; pop-soul
- Length: 38:26
- Label: UNI
- Producer: Archie Russell; Hillery Johnson; Leo Austell

Betty Everett chronology
I Need You So (reissue) (1968)	There'll Come a Time (1969)	Love Rhymes (1974)

Singles from There'll Come a Time
- 1. "There'll Come a Time" Released: January 1969; 2. "I Can't Say No to You" Released: April 1969; 3. "Maybe" Released: September 1969; 4. "It's Been a Long Time" Released: November 1969; 5. "Unlucky Girl" Released: May 1970

There'll Come a Time is the fourth studio album by American singer Betty Everett, released in 1969 on the UNI label.

== Reception ==
Professional ratings
Review scores
Source	Rating
AllMusic	4.5/5 stars

Richie Unterberger of AllMusic stated "Featuring her number two R&B single (and Top 40 pop hit) 'There'll Come a Time,' this has much more of a sweet soul flavor than her Vee-Jay sides, at times blending the trademarks of her brassy native Chicago scene with a Philadelphia influence."

== History ==
The album peaked at No. 44 on Billboard's Best Selling Rhythm & Blues LPs chart. The album consisted of five singles, and all five charted. The album's first single, "There'll Come a Time", peaked at No. 2 on the R&B chart and No. 26 on the pop chart. "I Can't Say No to You" peaked at No. 78 on the pop chart and No. 29 R&B. "Maybe" peaked at No. 116 on the pop chart. "It's Been a Long Time" peaked at No. 96 on the pop chart and No. 17 on the R&B chart. Another single was issued, "Unlucky Girl", which peaked at No. 46 on the R&B chart and was added as a bonus track to the 1995 CD reissue of the album.

== Track listing ==
Side one
No.	Title	Writer(s)	Length
1.	"You're Falling in Love"	Floyd Smith, Lee Simmons	2:50
2.	"Better Tomorrow Than Today"	Eddie Sullivan	2:33
3.	"Maybe"	F. Smith, L. Simmons	2:29
4.	"1900 Yesterday"	Johnny Cameron	2:30
5.	"Sugar"	Neil Sedaka	2:24
6.	"I Need a Change"	Tom Dorsey	2:18

Side two
No.	Title	Writer(s)	Length
7.	"I Can't Say No to You"	Bob Stone	2:38
8.	"Hold On"	Curtis Mayfield	2:22
9.	"There'll Come a Time"	Eugene Record, F. Smith	2:40
10.	"Take Me"	Benjio Caffee	2:18
11.	"Is There a Chance for Me"	Bernard Reed, Daniel Reed, T. Dobbins	2:12
12.	"The Same Old Me"	F. Smith, Gerald Sims	2:30

== Charts ==
Chart (1969)	Peak position
US Best Selling Rhythm & Blues LPs (Billboard)	44

=== Singles ===
Year	Single	Chart positions	
Year	Single	US	US R&B
1969	"There'll Come a Time"	26	2
1969	"I Can't Say No to You"	78	29
1969	"Maybe"	116	–
1969	"It's Been a Long Time"	96	17
1970	"Unlucky Girl"	–	46
