= Harold Burrage =

American blues and soul musician

Background information
- Born: March 30, 1931; Chicago, Illinois, U.S.
- Died: November 26, 1966 (aged 35) Chicago, Illinois, U.S.
- Genres: Rhythm & Blues, Soul
- Occupations: Singer, songwriter, pianist, record producer
- Instruments: Vocal, piano
- Labels: Decca, Aladdin, States, Cobra, Vee-Jay, M-Pac, Paso, Foxy

Harold Edwin Burrage (March 30, 1931 – November 26, 1966) was an American blues and soul singer, pianist, songwriter, and record producer.

== Biography ==
Born in Chicago, Illinois, Burrage did session work as a pianist in the 1950s and 1960s as well as recording under his own name. He released singles on Decca, Aladdin, States, and Cobra in the 1950s, and for Vee-Jay and M-Pac in the 1960s. Burrage's backing bands included the likes of Otis Rush, Willie Dixon, Wayne Bennett, and Jody Williams, while Burrage supported Magic Sam, Charles Clark, and others as a pianist.

Burrage's first recording was "Hi-Yo Silver", written by Burrage and Claude Trenier, for Decca Records in 1950, backed by Horace Henderson's band.

Burrage's only national hit as singer was the 1965 Chicago soul song "Got to Find a Way", which reached number 31 on the US Billboard R&B chart. The following year Burrage died in Chicago, aged 35, from heart failure at the home of Tyrone Davis, a musician Burrage influenced.

== Discography ==
From The Soul Discography

Harold Burrage with Horace Henderson & His Orchestra, Chicago, IL (1950)
- "I Need My Baby", Decca 48175
- "Hi Yo Silver", Decca 48175
- "I Ain't Mad at No One", Charly CRB 1128

Harold Burrage with Jimmy Binkley Orchestra, Chicago, IL (1951)

- "Way Down Boogie", Aladdin 3194
- "Sweet Brown Girl", Aladdin 3194

Harold Burrage and Combo, Chicago, IL (1954)

- "I Feel So Fine", States 144
- "You’re Gonna Cry", States 144

Harold Burrage, Chicago, IL (1956)

- "One More Dance", Cobra 5004
- "You Eat Too Much", Cobra 5004
- "Hot Dog and a Bottle Of Pop", Flyright (E) FLY 579

Harold Burrage, Chicago, IL (1957)

- "Messed Up", Cobra 5012
- "I Love My Baby", P-Vine Special (J) PLP
- "I Don't Care Who Knows", Cobra 5012
- "Stop for the Red Light", Flyright (E) FLY 579
- "Stop for the Red Light", Cobra 5018
- "I’m Satisfied", Flyright (E) FLY 579
- "Satisfied", Cobra 5018
- "Hey Little Girl", Unissued

Harold Burrage With Willie Dixon Band, Chicago, IL (1957)

- "Crazy About My Baby", P-Vine Special (J) PLP
- "She Knocks Me Out", Cobra 5022, Faro 5030
- "My Love Has Been in Vain", Unissued
- "A Heart Filled With Pain", Cobra 5022, Faro 5030

Harold Burrage, Chicago, IL (1958)

- "I Cry For You", Flyright (E) FLY 594
- "I Cry For You", Cobra 5026, Vivid 102
- "Betty Jean", Cobra 5026, Vivid 102

Harold Burrage, Chicago, IL (1959)

- "I’ve Got A Reason", Unissued
- "What You Don't Know", Vee Jay 318
- "Baby When", Unissued
- "Crying For You Baby", Vee Jay 318
- "Hi ho Silver", Unissued
- "You K.O.’d Me", Vee Jay 356
- "Great Day in the Morning", Vee Jay 356

Harold Burrage With Milt Bland Orchestra, Chicago, IL (1960)

- "Please Love Me", Paso 101
- "Pretty Little Liddy", Paso 101
- "A Fool (For Hiding My Love From You)", Paso 102
- "Say You Love Me", Paso 102

Harold Burrage, Chicago, IL (1962)

- "I Was Wrong", Foxy 009
- "You Ought To Love Me", Foxy 009
- "Master Key", M-Pac 7201
- "Faith (And Understanding)", M-Pac 7201

Harold Burrage, Chicago, IL (1963)

- "Mister Wall (Mister Window)", P-Vine Special (J) PLP 9003
- "Long Ways Together", M-Pac 7204
- "I’ll Take One", M-Pac 7204
- "You Mean The World To Me", P-Vine Special (J) PLP 9003
- "Everybody's Dancing’", M-Pac 7210
- "Your Friend (That's A Friend)", M-Pac 7210, 7222
- "Baby I’m Alright", M-Pac 7211
- "Fifty-fifty", M-Pac 7211

Harold Burrage, Chicago, IL, (1965)

- "Take Me Now", M-Pac 7222, 7234
- "Got To Find A Way", M-Pac 7225
- "How To Fix Your Mouth (To Say What You Say)", M-Pac 7225
- "You Made Me So Happy", M-Pac 7227, 7234
- "Things Ain't What They Used To Be (Since You Been Gone)", M-Pac 7227
- "I’m in Love", P-Vine Special (J) PLP 9003
- "Hang My Head And Cry", P-Vine Special (J) PLP 9003
- "More Power To You", P-Vine Special (J) PLP 9003

Harold Burrage, Chicago, IL (1966)

- "More Power To You", M-Pac 7229
- "A Long Way Together", M-Pac 7229

== Additional recordings ==
- Pioneer Of Chicago Soul, P-Vine Special PLP 9003 (1979)
- Messed Up! The Cobra Recordings 1956–58, Westside WESM 634 (2001)
