= Buster Benton =

American blues guitarist and singer

Background information
- Born: Arley Benton; July 19, 1932; Texarkana, Arkansas, United States
- Died: January 20, 1996 (aged 63) Chicago, Illinois, United States
- Genres: Chicago blues, soul blues
- Occupations: Singer, guitarist, songwriter
- Instruments: Vocals, guitar
- Years active: Mid-1950s–1996
- Label: Various

Arley "Buster" Benton (July 19, 1932 – January 20, 1996) was an American blues guitarist and singer. He played guitar in Willie Dixon's Blues All-Stars and is best known for his solo rendition of Dixon's song "Spider in My Stew." Benton was tenacious, and despite the amputation of parts of both legs in the latter part of his lengthy career, he never stopped playing his own version of Chicago blues.

== Biography ==
He was born Arley Benton, in Texarkana, Arkansas.

While residing in Toledo, Ohio, in the mid-1950s, and having been influenced by Sam Cooke and B.B. King, Benton began playing blues. By 1959, he was leading his own band in Chicago. During the 1960s, the local record labels Melloway, Alteen, Sonic, and Twinight released several singles by Benton. However, because of a lack of opportunities in the early 1960s, he gave up playing professionally for several years and worked as an auto mechanic. His earlier work was an amalgam of blues and soul. According to the music journalist Bill Dahl, "in the late 1970s, when the popularity of blues music was at low ebb, Benton's recordings, particularly for Ronn Records, were a breath of fresh air."

Benton joined Willie Dixon's Blues All-Stars in 1971 and was a fixture in the band for some time. He played on the 1973 album The All Star Blues World of Maestro Willie Dixon and His Chicago Blues Band, issued by Spivey Records.

Dixon was credited as the songwriter of Benton's best-known song, "Spider in My Stew", released by Jewel Records, based in Shreveport, Louisiana. It gave Benton a modicum of fame, and his 1974 follow-up, "Money Is the Name of the Game", helped to cement his standing. Benton's 1978 album for Jewel's subsidiary Ronn Records (also titled Spider in My Stew) became recognized as one of the more engaging Chicago blues albums of its time.

Benton recorded three further albums for Ichiban Records, but in comparison to his work on the Ronn label, they were not commercially successful. One of these albums was Money's the Name of the Game, produced by Gary B.B. Coleman and released in 1989. Benton also issued a record on the Blue Phoenix label. His fortitude did not go unnoticed. He suffered from diabetes and received dialysis in the final years of his life. In 1993, part of his right leg was amputated as a result of poor circulation due to the disease; he had already lost a portion of the other leg some ten years before. He soldiered on, playing his brand of the blues until his death. However, as the music journalist Tony Russell wrote, Benton "never found another money spider".

Benton died in January 1996, in Chicago, from the effects of diabetes, at age 63. In 2020 the Killer Blues Headstone Project placed the headstone for Buster Benton at Homewood Memorial garden in Homewood, Illinois.

His work has been included on several compilation albums, including Chicago Blues Festival: 1969–1986 (2001).

== Album discography ==
- Spider in My Stew (Ronn, 1978)
- Blues Buster (Red Lightnin', 1979)
- Buster Benton Is the Feeling (Ronn, 1980)
- First Time in Europe (Blue Phoenix, 1983)
- Why Me (Ichiban, 1988)
- Money's the Name of the Game (Ichiban, 1989)
- I Like to Hear My Guitar Sing (Ichiban, 1991)
- Blues at the Top (Evidence Music, 1993)
- That's the Reason (Ronn, 1997)
- Blues and Trouble (Black & Blue, 2002)

== See also ==
- List of Chicago blues musicians
- List of soul-blues musicians
