= Spider in My Stew =

Single by Buster Benton
- Released: 1970
- Recorded: 1970
- Genre: Blues
- Length: 3:25
- Label: Supreme
- Songwriter(s): Willie Dixon
- Producer(s): Soul Productions

"Spider in My Stew" is a song composed by Willie Dixon and first recorded by American blues musician Buster Benton. It is performed as a slow, minor-key blues, with Benton's impassioned vocal and B. B. King-influenced electric guitar playing. For the recording, Benton, on vocal and guitar, is joined by blues veterans Dixon on bass, Carey Bell on harmonica, Mighty Joe Young on guitar, and Billy Davenport on drums.

In 1970, the small Supreme Records label released the song on a single, with "Dangerous Woman" on the flip side (no A-side/B-side designations). When the Shreveport, Louisiana, Jewel Records released it again in 1974, it still failed to reach the Billboard charts, but it "gave Benton a taste of fame," according to biographer Bill Dahl.

The song was used as the title track for the well-regarded 1979 Benton album on Jewel subsidiary Ronn Records, Spider in My Stew; however, as the music journalist Tony Russell commented, Benton "never found another money spider." As Benton's best-known song, it is included on several anthology albums of Benton's music and various artists' compilations.
