= Cobra Records =

American record company

- Label of first single issued by Cobra with distinctive name design
- Founded: 1956
- Founder: Eli Toscano
- Defunct: 1959
- Status: Defunct
- Genre: Blues, rhythm and blues
- Country of origin: United States
- Location: Chicago

Cobra Records was an independent record label that operated in Chicago from 1956 to 1959 and launched the careers of Chicago blues artists Otis Rush, Magic Sam and Buddy Guy, a new generation who pioneered the West Side Sound.

Cobra was started on Chicago's West Side in 1956 by Eli Toscano, a record store- and television repair shop owner, with help from promoter Howard Bedno. When his previous record label, Abco Records, failed to generate much interest, Toscano approached Willie Dixon about working for him. Dissatisfied with his arrangement with Chess Records, Dixon joined Cobra and served as a talent scout, producer, arranger, songwriter and bassist, becoming "the artistic vision behind Cobra Records".

First to record for Cobra was Otis Rush. His single "I Can't Quit You Baby" became a hit, spending six weeks in the Billboard R&B chart, where it reached number six in 1956. Rush recorded another seven singles for Cobra, described as "defining moments of Chicago blues." In 1957, Magic Sam recorded his signature song "All Your Love" and released four singles on Cobra. Buddy Guy released two singles in 1958 on Cobra's Artistic Records subsidiary.

From 1956–1958 Cobra issued singles by a variety of acts, including Ike Turner and several blues veterans. However, by 1959 financial troubles overtook the company and it went out of business. The Cobra catalogue was subsequently purchased by Stan Lewis of Jewel/Paula/Ron Records. Most of the Cobra (and Artistic) recordings (57 tracks, including several alternate and outtakes) were released on The Cobra Records Story: Chicago Rock and Blues 1956–1958 by Capricorn Records in 1993. In 2013, 40 songs from the Cobra catalogue were released on a two-CD set, titled Double Trouble: The Cobra Record Story.

Currently, P-VINE holds the rights to Cobra Records.

== Discography ==
=== Cobra Records ===
List of Cobra singles
Catalogue number	Artist	Title (A-side / B-side)	Year released
5000	Otis Rush	"I Can't Quit You Baby" / "Sit Down Baby"	1956
5001	The Clouds	"Rock and Roll Boogie" / "I Do"	1956
5002	Shakey Horton	"Have a Good Time" / "Need My Baby"	1956
5003	The Calvaes	"Fine Girl" / "Mambo Fiesta"	1956
5004	Harold Burrage & His Combo	"One More Dance" / "You Eat Too Much"	1956
5005	Otis Rush & His Band	"Violent Love" / "My Love Will Never Die"	1956
5006	Sunnyland Slim	"It's You Baby" / "Highway 61"	1957
5007	Lee Jackson	"Fishin' in My Pond" / "I'll Just Keep Walkin'"	1957
5008	Gloria Irving	"I Need a Man" / "For You and Only You"	1957
5009	Duke Jenkins Orchestra	"Something Else" / "The Duke Walks"	1957
5010	Otis Rush	"Groaning the Blues" / "If You Were Mine"	1957
5011	Little Willy Foster	"Crying the Blues" / "Little Girl"	1957
5012	Harold Burrage	"Messed Up" / "I Don't Care Who Knows"	1957
5013	Magic Sam	"All Your Love" / "Love Me with a Feeling"	1957
5014	The Calvaes	"Born with Rhythm" / "Lonely Lonely Village"	1957
5015	Otis Rush	"Love That Woman" / "Jump Sister Bessie"	1957
5016	Clarence Jolly	"Changing Love" / "Don't Leave Me"	1957
5017	Guitar Shorty	"You Don't Treat Me Right" / "Irma Lee"	1957
5018	Harold Burrage	"Stop for the Red Light" / "Satisfied"	1957
5019	Betty Everett	"My Life Depends on You" / "My Love"	1957
5020	Duke Jenkins Orchestra	"Where Can My Loved One Be" / "Shake It"	1957
5021	Magic Sam	"Everything Gonna Be Alright" / "Look Whatcha Done"	1958
5022	Harold Burrage, Willie Dixon Band	"She Knocks Me Out" / "A Heart (Filled with Pain)"	1958
5023	Otis Rush with Willie Dixon Orchestra	"Three Times a Fool" / "She's a Good 'Un"	1958
5024	Betty Everett	"Ain't Gonna Cry" / "Killer Diller"	1958
5025	Magic Sam	"All Night Long" / "All My Whole Life"	1958
5026	Harold Burrage & His Band	"I Cry for You" / "Betty Jean"	1958
5027	Otis Rush	"It Takes Time" / "Checking on My Baby"	1958
5028	Jimmy & Kelly the Rock-a-Beats	"Little Chickie" / "Bonnie"	1958
5029	Magic Sam	"Easy Baby" / "21 Days in Jail"	1958
5030	Otis Rush & His Band	"Double Trouble" / "Keep on Loving Me, Baby"	1958
5031	Betty Everett & Willie Dixon Band	"I'll Weep No More" / "Tell Me, Darling"	1958
5032	Otis Rush & His Band	"All Your Love (I Miss Loving)" / "My Baby's a Good 'Un"	1958
5033	Ike Turner's Kings of Rhythm	"Walking Down the Aisle" / "Box Top"	1959

=== Artistic Records ===
List of Artistic singles
Catalogue number	Artist	Title (A-side / B-side)	Year released
1500	Charles Clark & Willie Dixon Band	"Row Your Boat" / "Hidden Charms"	1958
1501	Buddy Guy & His Band	"Sit and Cry (The Blues)" / "Try to Quit You Baby"	1958
1502	Shakey Jake Harris & Willie Dixon Band|	"Roll Your Moneymaker" / "Call Me if You Need Me"	1958
1503	Buddy Guy & His Band	"This Is the End" / "You Sure Can't Do"	1959
1504	Ike Turner's Kings of Rhythm	"(I Know) You Don't Love Me" / "Down and Out"	1959

=== Abco Records ===
List of Abco singles
Catalogue number	Artist	Title (A-side / B-side)	Year released
100	Arbee Stidham	"I'll Always Remember You" / "Meet Me Half Way"	1956
101	Herby Joe	"Smoke Stack Lightning" / "Dreamed (Last Night)"	1956
102	Zona Sago's Modern Sounds	"Short Order" / "Jivin' at Random"	1956
103	Freddie Hall & the Aces	"Can't This Be Mine" / "Playin' Hard to Get"	1956
104	Louis Myers & the Aces	"Just Whaling" / "Bluesy"	1956
105	Rip-Chords	"I Love You the Most" / "Let's Do the Razzle Dazzle"	1956
106	Morris Pejoe	"Screaming and Crying" / "Maybe Blues"	1956
107	Arbee Stidham	"When I Find My Baby" / "Please Let It Be Me'"	1957

== Bibliography ==
- Haig, Diana Reid (1993). The Cobra Records Story: Chicago Rock and Blues 1956–1958 (Media notes). Various artists. Nashville, Tennessee: Capricorn Records. 9-42012-2.
- Broven, John (2009). Record Makers and Breakers: Voices of the Independent Rock 'n' Roll Pioneers. Champaign, Illinois: University of Illinois Press. ISBN 978-0-252-03290-5.
- Dixon, Willie; Snowden, Don (1989). I Am the Blues. Da Capo Press. ISBN 0-306-80415-8.
- Heatley, Michael (2013). Double Trouble: The Cobra Records Story (Album notes). Various artists. United Kingdom: One Day Music. DAY2CD204.
- Koda, Cub (1996). "Otis Rush". In Erlewine, Michael (ed.). All Music Guide to the Blues. San Francisco: Miller Freeman Books. ISBN 0-87930-424-3.
- Whitburn, Joel (1988). Top R&B Singles 1942–1988. Menomonee Falls, Wisconsin: Record Research. ISBN 0-89820-068-7.
