= Betty Everett =

American R&B and soul singer-songwriter (1939–2001)

- Everett in 1964

Background information
- Born: Betty Jean Everett; November 23, 1939; Greenwood, Mississippi, U.S.
- Died: August 19, 2001 (aged 61) Beloit, Wisconsin, U.S.
- Genres: R&B, southern soul, country
- Instruments: Vocals, piano
- Years active: 1957–2000
- Labels: Cobra, Vee-Jay, One-derful, Uni, Fantasy

Betty Jean Everett (November 23, 1939 – August 19, 2001) was an American soul singer and pianist, best known for her biggest hit single, the million-selling "Shoop Shoop Song (It's In His Kiss)", and her duet "Let It Be Me" with Jerry Butler.

== Biography ==
=== Early career ===
Everett was born in Greenwood, Mississippi, United States, the daughter of Catherine and Abel Everett. She began playing the piano and singing gospel music in church at the age of nine. In 1957, she moved to Chicago, Illinois, to pursue a career in secular music. She recorded for various small local Chicago soul labels, before she was signed in 1963 by Calvin Carter, A&R musical director of fast-growing independent label Vee-Jay Records.

An initial single failed, but her second Vee-Jay release, a cover version of "You're No Good" (written by Clint Ballard Jr. and later a No. 1 hit for Linda Ronstadt), just missed the U.S. top 50. Her next single, "The Shoop Shoop Song (It's in His Kiss)", was her biggest solo hit. The song climbed to No. 6 on the Billboard Hot 100 and made No. 1 on the Cashbox R&B chart for three weeks.

Her other hits included "I Can't Hear You", covered by numerous artists, including Dusty Springfield, Helen Reddy, and others, "Getting Mighty Crowded" (covered by Elvis Costello in 1980), and several duets with Jerry Butler, including "Let It Be Me", which made the US top 5 in 1964 and was another Cashbox R&B No. 1. After Vee-Jay folded in 1966, she recorded for several other labels, including ABC, Fantasy, and Uni.

After an unsuccessful year with ABC, a move to Uni brought major success in 1969 with "There'll Come a Time", co-written by producer and lead singer of The Chi-Lites, Eugene Record. This peaked at No. 2 in the Billboard R&B listing (No. 26 on the Hot 100) and topped the Cashbox chart. However, most of her later work would not match the success she had with Vee-Jay, although there were other R&B hits such as "It's Been a Long Time" and "I Got to Tell Somebody", which re-united her with Calvin Carter in 1970. The 1975 album Happy Endings had arrangements by Gene Page and includes a cover of "God Only Knows" by the Beach Boys. Her final recording was issued in 1980, again produced by Carter. Her awards include the BMI Pop Award (both for 1964 and 1991) and the BMI R&B Award (for 1964).

=== Later career ===
Until her death, Everett resided with her sister in South Beloit, Illinois, where she was involved in the Rhythm & Blues Foundation and the churches of the Fountain of Life and New Covenant. In 1989, a handler of Everett brought her to the attention of Worldwide TMA, a management consulting firm in Chicago. Under the direction of Steve Arvey and Scott Pollack, former chairman of the Chicago Songwriters Association, the firm started work on reviving Everett's singing career. Within a year she contracted with Pollack taking on all management decisions and management financing.

In 1984, her signature hit, "The Shoop Shoop Song (It's in His Kiss)", was used for the opening credits in the U.S. print of the Madonna film Desperately Seeking Susan. In 1990, the song had a cover version in Mermaids for the end credits, and was recorded by the star of the film, Cher. This reached No. 1 in the UK Singles Chart and charted well elsewhere in Europe.

Everett had secured an indie label deal in the US and a new single "Don't Cry Now" had been recorded, penned by Larry Weiss (Trumpet Records, unreleased). In connection to the preceding events, Everett was booked and aired a 20-minute appearance on the hit TV show at the time, Current Affair. She was then booked to star at the 1991 Chicago Blues Festival which aired live worldwide on over 400 PBS radio channels, marking Everett's last live appearance on radio. Later that year, two concerts were booked for consecutive weekends in late October 1991; one at Trump's Taj Mahal in Atlantic City, the other at the Greek Theatre in Los Angeles. All had been arranged through management and Charles McMillan, Jerry Butler's longtime friend and personal manager. However, Everett declined to show for the engagements. Despite exposure, she was unable to resurrect her career because of health problems.

She was inducted into the Rhythm and Blues Foundation's Hall of Fame in 1996 and, about four years later, made her last public appearance on the PBS special Doo Wop 51, along with her former singing partner, Jerry Butler. This, according to The Independent (August 2001), was met with raves about the brief reunion where she "brought the house down". Butler, in his autobiography, Only the Strong Survive, compared Betty with Gladys Knight as a singer in that she seemed to do everything so effortlessly.

Everett died at her home in Beloit, Wisconsin, on August 19, 2001, aged 61.

== Discography ==
=== Studio albums ===
Year	Album	Chart positions	
Year	Album	US R&B	US Pop
1962	Betty Everett & Ketty Lester (with Ketty Lester)	—	—
1963	You're No Good (reissued in 1964 as It's in His Kiss)	—	—
1964	Delicious Together (with Jerry Butler)	—	102
1968	I Need You So (reissued material)	—	—
1969	There'll Come a Time	44	—
1974	Love Rhymes	—	—
1975	Happy Endings	—	—
"—" denotes releases that did not chart.

=== Compilation albums ===
- 1964: The Very Best of Betty Everett
- 1969: Betty Everett and the Impressions (with The Impressions)
- 1993: The Shoop Shoop Song
- 1995: The Fantasy Years
- 1998: Best of Betty Everett: Let It Be Me
- 2000: The Shoop Shoop Song (It's in His Kiss)

=== Singles ===
Year	Title	Peak chart positions		
Year	Title	US	US R&B	UK
1963	"The Prince of Players"	—	—	—
1963	"You're No Good"	51	5	—
1964	"The Shoop Shoop Song (It's in His Kiss)"	6	1	34
1964	"I Can't Hear You"	66	39	—
1964	"Let It Be Me" (duet with Jerry Butler)	5	1	—
1965	"Getting Mighty Crowded"	65	28	29
1965	"Smile" (duet with Jerry Butler)	42	16	—
1965	"I'm Gonna Be Ready"	117	—	—
1967	"People Around Me"	—	—	—
1967	"I Can't Say"	—	—	—
1969	"There'll Come a Time"	26	2	—
1969	"I Can't Say No to You"	78	29	—
1969	"It's Been a Long Time"	96	17	—
1970	"Unlucky Girl"	—	46	—
1970	"I Got to Tell Somebody"	96	22	—
1971	"Ain't Nothing Gonna Change Me"	113	32	—
1973	"Danger"	—	79	—
1974	"Sweet Dan"	—	38	—
1978	"True Love (You Took My Heart)"	—	78	—
1980	"Hungry for You"	—	—	—
"—" denotes releases that did not chart.
