= Lee Jackson (blues musician) =

American Chicago blues musician (1921–1979)

- Born: Warren George Harding Lee; August 18, 1921; Gill, Lee County, Arkansas, United States
- Died: July 1, 1979 (aged 57) Chicago, Illinois, United States
- Genres: Chicago blues
- Occupation(s): Guitarist, bass guitarist, singer, songwriter
- Instrument(s): Guitar, bass guitar
- Years active: Mid 1950s–1979
- Labels: Various including Delmark, Cobra, BluesWay Records

Warren George Harding Lee (August 18, 1921 – July 1, 1979), known professionally as Lee Jackson, was an American Chicago blues guitarist, bass guitarist, singer and songwriter. Although he did release a number of recordings in his own name, such as Lonely Girl (1974), he is most known for his work on recordings with other blues musicians such as Johnny Shines, Willie Dixon, Jimmy Reed, J. B. Hutto, Sunnyland Slim, Lacy Gibson, and Little Walter. AllMusic noted that "the playing style of Jackson is vastly influential".

Jackson was fatally shot during a family argument in 1979.

== Biography ==
He was born in Gill, Lee County, Arkansas, United States. In his youth, Jackson was influenced by his uncle Alf Bonner and aunt Cora, who led their own jug band. The couple also ran a roadside cafe situated between Helena, Arkansas, and Memphis, Tennessee, which regularly played host to blues musicians from neighbouring States. Jackson joined the Bonner's Jug Band and performed with them for a number of years. He thereafter branched out on his own as a traveling musician, playing in Memphis, then across Florida, in St. Louis, Missouri, before finally, in around 1950, coming to a halt in Chicago, Illinois. The French music historian, Gérard Herzhaft, later commented that "The guitar style of Lee Jackson, sharp, jazzy, with sparse but brilliant and bluesy notes was quite original for the immediate post-war Chicago blues scene, reflecting his years playing with swinging jug bands".

He was employed in a meat-packaging company, and met Leonard Chess. Jackson's work in the local blues clubs earned him recording opportunities with both Chess Records and Vee-Jay Records in the mid-1950s, but these were not released. In 1956, another recording which ended up being issued was for Cobra Records. Jackson recorded the Willie Dixon-penned humorous track, "Fishin' in My Pond", a twelve bar blues number, on which Jackson played guitar and also supplied variable vocals, which expressed frustration and disappointment. The song was ostensibly about a man whose fish got stolen from his pond, although the lyrics had a metaphoric reference to illicit sexual shenanigans. The single was released in February 1957.

In mid-1960, Lee Jackson, Eddy Clearwater, Little Brother Montgomery, Roosevelt Sykes, St. Louis Jimmy Oden, Sunnyland Slim, Tom Archia, Corky Roberts(on), and Shakey Jake Harris were all guests at Armand "Jump" Jackson's (no relation) "Blues Party", an event organized in "Jump" Jackson's garage studio, on 5727 South La Salle Street. In 1961, Lee Jackson had "Please Baby" / "Juanita" released on Key Hole Records. His own recordings were not successful and he then used his association with various musicians to begin regular work as a studio session player. By now an accomplished guitarist, his first major studio assignment in this regard was on Roosevelt Sykes album, Roosevelt Sykes Sings The Blues (1962). The collection was recorded in Chicago, and it featured Sykes accompanied by Lee Jackson on guitar, plus Willie Dixon (bass), Armand "Jump" Jackson (drums) and Sax Mallard (tenor saxophone). In addition, the album's opening track, "Slave For Your Love", was issued on a single. The following year, Jackson switched to playing the bass guitar on Billy Boy Arnold's, More Blues on the South Side. Jackson supplied bass guitar backing on four albums recorded between 1964 and 1966, by Homesick James, Johnny Shines, J. B. Hutto, and Otis Spann. Although the latter's Otis Spann's Chicago Blues had Jackson playing on just one track, the instrumental "G.B. Blues", a bonus track on the later CD reissue. In February 1966, Jackson played guitar backing Little Walter recording "Back In The Alley", "I Feel So Bad", and "Chicken Shack"; tracks that eventually appeared in compilation albums such as Blue Midnight Volume Three 1950-1966. J. B. Hutto's 1968 effort, Hawk Squat, saw Jackson revert to rhythm guitar.

In 1969, Jackson supplied bass guitar work on half of the tracks on Johnny Shines with Big Walter Horton, as well as on Hound Dog Taylor's "Watch Out" single. In 1970, Jackson was part of entourage on the American Folk Blues Festival's European tour and two sides of his from that event were issued on the subsequent album release. His guitar provided part of the backing on the early 1970s Big Boss Men live collection of Willie Dixon and Jimmy Reed, and Jackson was in the rhythm section that played on J. B. Hutto's, Slidewinder (Delmark Records, 1973).

Jackson recorded what turned out to be his only solo album, Lonely Girl, for BluesWay Records in 1974. He wrote every track on the album, which included input from Carey Bell (harmonica) and Phil Upchurch (bass). The following year, Jackson recorded an instrumental track, "Apallo 17" (sic), which commemorated the final mission of the Apollo program. Written by Jackson, it was released on C.J. Records. In 1971, Jackson had recorded a track named "Apollo 15" for Bea & Baby Records, but this remains unreleased. Around this period Jackson played bass as part of Willie Dixon's Chicago All-Stars group. Jackson wrote three of the songs that were recorded by Lacy Gibson, including "Chicago Women" and "Dirty Old Man", for Gibson's album, Crying for My Baby (1977). The same year, Jackson recorded another album's worth of material, under the production of Ralph Bass, but no recording was issued although several cuts have appeared on subsequent compilations. By the end of the decade, Jackson played more frequently in Chicago North Side blues clubs, connecting with a younger clientele.

During a family argument, Jackson was fatally shot by the son of his new bride, and died in Chicago on July 1, 1979. He was buried on July 6.

== Legacy and confusion ==
Jackson backed the pianist Little Johnny Jones on two sides recorded in 1964, but these were not released until 1980.

In view of Jackson's three decade tenure as a session musician, recorded music containing his input has appeared on numerous compilation albums.

He is often confused with other musicians who share his common name.

== Discography ==
=== Solo singles ===
Year	Title	Record label
1957	"Fishin' in My Pond" / "I'll Just Keep Walkin'	Cobra Records
1961	"Please Baby" / "Juanita"	Key Hole Records
1967	"Christmas Song"	Bea & Baby Records
1975	"Apallo 17" / "Chop-Suey"	C.J. Records

=== Solo albums ===
Year	Title	Record label
1974	Lonely Girl	BluesWay Records

=== Collaborative albums ===
Year	Title	Record label	Credited to
1999	Smile On My Face §	Delmark Records	Sunnyland Slim with Lacy Gibson & Lee Jackson

§ Recorded in 1977

=== Appeared on ===
Year	Title	Artist	Jackson credit(s)
1962	Roosevelt Sykes Sings The Blues	Roosevelt Sykes	Guitar
1963	More Blues on the South Side	Billy Boy Arnold	Bass guitar
1964	Blues on the South Side	Homesick James	Bass guitar
1966	Master of Modern Blues Vol. 1	Johnny Shines	Bass guitar
1966	Master of Modern Blues Vol. 2	J. B. Hutto	Bass guitar
1966	Otis Spann's Chicago Blues	Otis Spann	Bass guitar
1968	Hawk Squat	J. B. Hutto	Guitar
1969	Johnny Shines with Big Walter Horton	Johnny Shines	Bass guitar
1970	American Folk Blues Festival	Various artists	Jackson on his own tracks "Juanita" and "Came Home This Morning"
1973	Slidewinder	J. B. Hutto	Guitar

== See also ==
- List of homicides in Illinois
- List of Chicago blues musicians
