= Fishin' in My Pond =

Single by Lee Jackson
- B-side: "I'll Just Keep Walkin'"
- Released: February 1957
- Recorded: 1956
- Genre: Chicago blues
- Length: 2:31
- Label: Cobra Records 5007
- Songwriter(s): A-side : Willie Dixon; B-side : Lee Jackson

"Fishin' in My Pond" was a song written by Willie Dixon in 1956. The song was recorded by the Chicago blues musician Lee Jackson in Chicago, Illinois, United States, that same year, and issued as a single on Cobra Records in February 1957.

== Recording ==
Jackson recorded the Dixon-penned humorous track, "Fishin' in My Pond", a twelve bar blues number, on which Jackson played guitar and also supplied variable vocals, which expressed frustration and disappointment. The song was ostensibly about a man whose fish got stolen from his pond, although the lyrics had a metaphoric reference to illicit sexual shenanigans. The single was released in February 1957.

The personnel on the recording were Jackson (vocals, guitar), Dixon (double bass), Sunnyland Slim (piano), Big Walter Horton (harmonica), Jimmy Rogers (guitar), Harold Ashby and Lucius Washington (tenor saxophone) and Jesse Fowler (drums).

It was reviewed in the February 23, 1957, issue of Billboard who stated "Lee Jackson chants a slow, rhythmic blues that is for the southern markets. Appealing, drifty type wax".

The B-side was the song "I'll Just Keep Walkin'", penned by Jackson.

== Later versions ==
"Fishin' in My Pond" was also recorded by Junior Valentine on his album I Can Tell (2000); by Hip Linkchain on Westside Chicago Blues Guitar (2007); by Wanda King on From a Blues Point of View (2008); by Jimmy Rogers and Left Hand Frank on The Dirty Dozens (2007); and Willie Dixon's own version of his song appeared on the compilation album, Boss of the Chicago Blues (Fuel Records, 2005).

== Compilation reissue ==
Jackson's track was included on the compilation album, Big Boss Men: A Chicago Blues Collection, released in 2013 on Fuel Records.

== Value ==
In December 2019, an original vinyl copy of the single sold for $228.
