= The Five Du-Tones =

The Five Du-Tones were an American soul vocal group, who enjoyed success in the dance craze era of the early 1960s. The group comprised Willie Guest, Robert Hopkins, LeRoy Joyce, Oscar Watson and James West. They came together while attending Patrick Henry High School in St. Louis, Missouri, in 1957.

== History ==
With Joyce's mother relocating to Chicago, Illinois, the majority of the group decided to follow her there. With Hopkins and Watson electing to stay in St. Louis, 1960 found the Chicago line-up supplemented by Andrew Butler and Frank McCurrey.

Between 1963 and 1966, the Five Du-Tones recorded nine singles on George Leaner's One-derful Records. "Please Change Your Mind" failed to chart, as did "Come Back Baby". The group's third release in 1963 finally got them noticed: "Shake a Tail Feather" (co-written by Andre Williams and Otha Hayes) was played on R&B stations across the country, but it failed to make the sales and chart position the airplay justified. The track peaked at No. 28 on the US Billboard R&B chart, and No. 51 on the Billboard Hot 100. The group continued to record fun dance tunes that helped bridge the gap between doo-wop and soul music. 1963's "The Chicken Astronaut" was an exemplary song of the short-lived "reluctant astronaut" subgenre of space music.

Constant touring exacted a heavy toll on the group in terms of creativity and mortality. Aged 26, West died from heart failure in 1963. He was replaced by David Scott, who had been a member of The Five Du-Tones touring backing band, The Exciters.

Next was "The Gouster" backed with "Monkey See Monkey Do." The B-side got some airplay, but neither track built on the success of its predecessor. "Nobody But (My Baby)" did even worse, so they tried another dance craze, "The Cool Bird". 1965 saw "Sweet Lips" and "The Woodbine Twine". The last Five Du-Tones single, a ballad called "Mountain of Love" was released in 1966; they disbanded in 1967.

The group's lead singer, Andrew Butler, eventually moved to Los Angeles and joined a latter-day version of The Rivingtons. After their dissolution due to illness, Butler worked in various versions of other 1950s doo-wop groups, such as Billy Richard's Coasters and The Robins.

"Shake a Tail Feather" was covered by Ike & Tina Turner in 1969, Ray Charles together with the Blues Brothers, and featured in a prominent choreography scene in The Blues Brothers (1980). It was also featured on the soundtrack of the 1988 film, Hairspray.

Robert Hopkins died on December 25, 2012, at the age of 71.

== Selected discography ==
All records issued on the One-derful record label:

- 1963, "Shake a Tail Feather" / "Divorce Court"
- 1963, "Dry Your Eyes" / "Come Back Baby"
- 1963, "The Flea" / "Please Change Your Mind"
- 1963, "The Chicken Astronaut" / "The Cool Bird"
- 1964, "Nobody But (My Baby)" / "That's How I Love You"
- 1964, "The Gouster" / "Monkey See-Monkey Do"
- 1965, "The Woodbine Twine" / "We Want More"
- 1965, "Sweet Lips" / "Let Me Love You"
