= McKinley Mitchell =

McKinley Mitchell (December 25, 1934 – January 18, 1986) was an American Chicago-based blues and rhythm and blues singer, who started out performing gospel music. His first recorded single was "Rock Everybody Rock" for Boxer Records in 1959. His 1962 record, "The Town I Live In", became a national R&B hit on the Chicago One-derful label. The record peaked at number 8 on the US Billboard R&B chart. In his later career Mitchell returned to Mississippi, and recorded I Won't Be Back for More in 1984.

Reviewing Mitchell's self-titled 1978 album, Robert Christgau wrote in Christgau's Record Guide (1981):

"A small miracle: Bobby Bland meets Brook Benton in the timeless realm of the not-quite-folkloric, where soul and blues sound precisely contemporary and strings voice old horn riffs with no suggestion of sellout ... This is one of those groove records on which ordinary songwriting is transmuted by perfect pacing and unshakable stylistic conviction."

He was born in Jackson, Mississippi, and died in Chicago Heights, Illinois, from a heart attack in January 1986, at the age of 51.

== Albums discography ==
- McKinley Mitchell (1978)
- I Won't Be Back for More (1984)
- The Last of McKinley Mitchell (1988)
