= Shake a Tail Feather =

Single by the Five Du-Tones
- Released: 1963
- Recorded: 1963
- Genre: R&B; garage rock
- Length: 2:24
- Label: One-DERFUL!
- Songwriters: Otha Hayes, Verlie Rice, Andre Williams

"Shake a Tail Feather" is a song written by Otha Hayes, Verlie Rice, and Andre Williams and originally recorded in 1963 by the Chicago-based group the Five Du-Tones. The original recording reached number 28 on Billboard's Hot R&B Singles chart and number 51 on the Billboard Hot 100.

== Background ==
The song references a number of dance styles/moves, including the Boogaloo, the Twist, the fly, the Bird, Monkey, the Mashed Potato, the duck, the swim, the Boney Maroney, and the Watusi.

== Notable cover versions ==
"Shake a Tail Feather" has been covered by many other artists over the years:

- A 1967 version by James & Bobby Purify reached number 25 on the Billboard Hot 100.
- Ike & Tina Turner recorded their version in 1968 for their album So Fine. It is also performed in the 1993 film about their lives, What's Love Got to Do with It.
- Ray Charles covered and performed the song during his scenes in the 1980 film The Blues Brothers where he was surrounded by dancers performing the move referenced in the song while he played a Rhodes piano and sang.
- The Romantics also recorded a version of the song in 1983. It appears on their album In Heat.
