= Willie Dixon =

American blues musician (1915–1992)

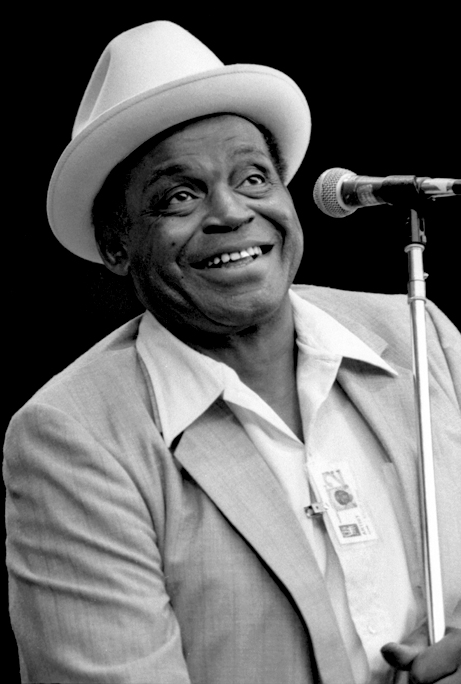
- Dixon at Monterey Jazz Festival 1981

Background information
- Born: William James Dixon; July 1, 1915; Vicksburg, Mississippi, U.S.
- Died: January 29, 1992 (aged 76) Burbank, California, U.S.
- Genres: Blues; Chicago blues; rhythm and blues; gospel
- Occupations: Musician; songwriter; arranger; record producer
- Instruments: Vocals; double bass; guitar
- Years active: 1939–1992
- Labels: Chess/Checker; Cobra; Columbia; Bluesville; Yambo
- Formerly of: Big Three Trio
- Website: willie-dixon.com

William James Dixon (July 1, 1915 – January 29, 1992) was an American blues musician, vocalist, songwriter, arranger and record producer. He was proficient in playing both the upright bass and the guitar, and sang with a distinctive voice, but he is perhaps best known as one of the most prolific songwriters of his time. Next to Muddy Waters, Dixon is recognized as the most influential person in shaping the post–World War II sound of the Chicago blues.

Dixon's songs have been recorded by countless musicians in many genres as well as by various ensembles in which he participated. A short list of his most famous compositions includes "Hoochie Coochie Man", "I Just Want to Make Love to You", "Little Red Rooster", "My Babe", "Spoonful", and "You Can't Judge a Book by the Cover". These songs were written during the peak years of Chess Records, from 1950 to 1965, and were performed by Muddy Waters, Howlin' Wolf, Little Walter, and Bo Diddley; they influenced a generation of musicians worldwide.

Dixon was an important link between the blues and rock and roll, working with Little Walter, Chuck Berry, and Bo Diddley in the late 1950s. In the 1960s, his songs were adapted by numerous rock artists. He received a Grammy Award and was inducted into the Blues Hall of Fame, the Rock and Roll Hall of Fame, and the Songwriters Hall of Fame.

== Biography ==
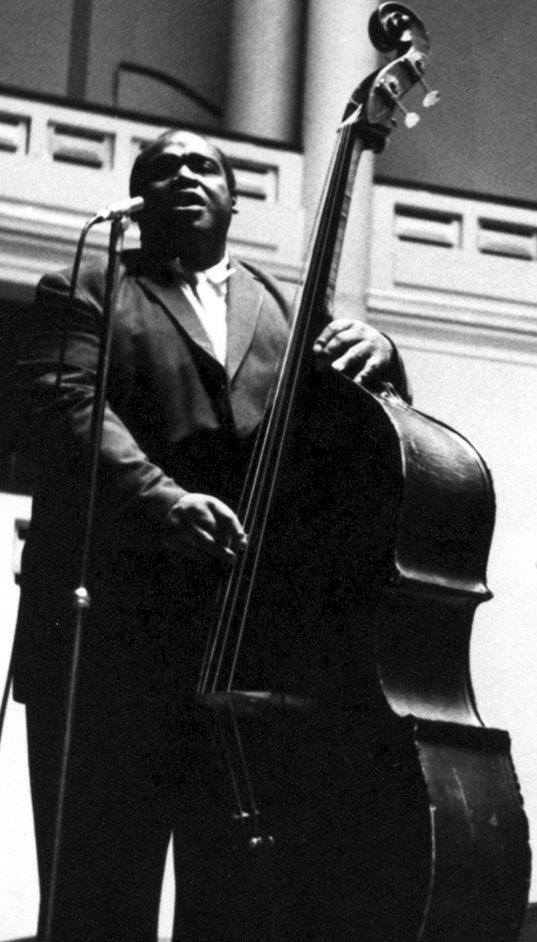
Dixon performing in 1963

=== Early life ===
Dixon was born in Vicksburg, Mississippi, on July 1, 1915. He was one of 14 children. His mother, Daisy, often rhymed things she said, a habit her son imitated. At the age of seven, young Dixon became an admirer of a band that featured pianist Little Brother Montgomery. He sang his first song at Springfield Baptist Church at the age of four. Dixon was introduced to blues when he served time on prison farms in Mississippi as a young teenager. Later in his teens, he learned to sing harmony from a local carpenter, Theo Phelps, who led a gospel quintet, the Union Jubilee Singers, in which Dixon sang bass; the group regularly performed on the Vicksburg radio station WQBC. He began adapting his poems into songs and even sold some to local music groups.

=== Adulthood ===
Dixon left Mississippi for Chicago in 1936. A man of considerable stature, standing 6 feet 3 inches tall and weighing over 250 pounds, he took up boxing, at which he was successful, winning the Illinois State Golden Gloves Heavyweight Championship (Novice Division) in 1937. Around 1939, he became a professional boxer and worked briefly as Joe Louis's sparring partner, but after four fights he left boxing in a dispute with his manager over money.

Dixon met Leonard Caston at a boxing gym, where they would harmonize at times. Dixon performed in several vocal groups in Chicago, but it was Caston that persuaded him to pursue music seriously. Caston built him his first bass, made of a tin-can and one string. Dixon's experience singing bass made the instrument familiar. He also learned to play the guitar.

In 1939, Dixon was a founding member of the Five Breezes, with Caston, Joe Bell, Gene Gilmore and Willie Hawthorne. The group blended blues, jazz, and vocal harmonies, in the mode of the Ink Spots. Dixon's progress on the upright bass came to an abrupt halt with the advent of World War II, when he refused induction into military service as a conscientious objector and was imprisoned for ten months. He refused to go to war because he would not fight for a nation in which institutionalized racism and racist laws were prevalent. After the war, he formed a group named the Four Jumps of Jive. He then reunited with Caston, forming the Big Three Trio, which went on to record for Columbia Records.

=== Pinnacle of career ===
Dixon signed with Chess Records as a recording artist, but he began performing less, being more involved with administrative tasks for the label. By 1951, he was a full-time employee at Chess, where he acted as producer, talent scout, session musician and staff songwriter. He was also a producer for the Chess subsidiary Checker Records. His relationship with Chess was sometimes strained, but he stayed with the label from 1948 to the early 1960s. During this time Dixon's output and influence were prodigious. From late 1956 to early 1959, he worked in a similar capacity for Cobra Records, for which he produced early singles for Otis Rush, Magic Sam, and Buddy Guy. In 1956, Dixon wrote "Fishin' in My Pond", which was recorded by Lee Jackson, and released on Cobra in February 1957. Dixon later recorded for Bluesville Records. From the late 1960s until the mid-1970s, Dixon ran his own record label, Yambo Records, and two subsidiary labels, Supreme and Spoonful. He released his 1971 album, Peace?, on Yambo and also singles by McKinley Mitchell, Lucky Peterson and others.

Dixon is considered one of the key figures in the creation of Chicago blues. He worked with Chuck Berry, Muddy Waters, Howlin' Wolf, Otis Rush, Bo Diddley, Little Walter, Sonny Boy Williamson II, Koko Taylor, Little Milton, Eddie Boyd, Jimmy Witherspoon, Lowell Fulson, Willie Mabon, Memphis Slim, Washboard Sam, Jimmy Rogers, Sam Lay and others.

In December 1964, the Rolling Stones reached number one on the UK Singles Chart with their cover of Dixon's "Little Red Rooster". In the same year, the group also covered "I Just Want To Make Love To You" on their debut album, The Rolling Stones.

=== Copyright battles ===
In his later years, Dixon became a tireless ambassador for the blues and a vocal advocate for its practitioners, founding the Blues Heaven Foundation, which works to preserve the legacy of the blues and to secure copyrights and royalties for blues musicians who were exploited in the past. Speaking with the simple eloquence that was a hallmark of his songs, Dixon claimed, "The blues are the roots and the other musics are the fruits. It's better keeping the roots alive, because it means better fruits from now on. The blues are the roots of all American music. As long as American music survives, so will the blues."

In 1977, unhappy with the small royalties paid by Chess's publishing company, Arc Music, Dixon and Muddy Waters sued Arc and later Dixon founded his own publishing company, Hoochie Coochie Music.

In 1987, Dixon reached an out-of-court settlement with the rock band Led Zeppelin after suing for plagiarism in the band's use of his music in "Bring It On Home" and lyrics from his composition "You Need Love" (1962) in the band's recording of "Whole Lotta Love".

=== Death and legacy ===
Dixon's health increasingly deteriorated during the 1970s and the 1980s, primarily as a result of long-term diabetes. Eventually one of his legs was amputated.

Dixon was inducted into the Blues Hall of Fame in 1980, in the inaugural session of the Blues Foundation's ceremony. In 1989 he received a Grammy Award for his album Hidden Charms.

Dixon died of heart failure on January 29, 1992, in Burbank, California. His body was carried by a horse-drawn hearse through where he grew up. He was buried in Burr Oak Cemetery, in Alsip, Illinois.

After his death, his widow, Marie Dixon, took over the Blues Heaven Foundation and moved the headquarters to Chess Records. Dixon was posthumously inducted into the Rock and Roll Hall of Fame in the category Early Influences (pre-rock) in 1994. On April 28, 2013, both Dixon and his grandson Alex Dixon were inducted into the Chicago Blues Hall of Fame.

In 2007, Dixon was honored with a marker on the Mississippi Blues Trail in Vicksburg.

The actor and comedian Cedric the Entertainer portrayed Dixon in Cadillac Records, a 2008 film loosely based on the early history of Chess Records.

In 2020, Rolling Stone ranked him as the 12th greatest bass player and mentioned him as history's most influential bluesman. Rolling Stone also placed him at number 51 on their list of "The 100 Greatest Songwriters of All Time".

== Songs ==
Dixon wrote or co-wrote more than 500 songs. Several have become blues standards, including "Help Me", "Hoochie Coochie Man", "I Can't Quit You Baby", "I Ain't Superstitious" "I'm Ready", "Little Red Rooster", "My Babe", and "Spoonful". Other Dixon compositions that reached the record charts include "Evil" (Howlin' Wolf), "I Just Want to Make Love to You" (Muddy Waters), "Pretty Thing" (Bo Diddley), "The Seventh Son" (Willie Mabon), "Wang Dang Doodle" (Koko Taylor), and "You Can't Judge a Book by the Cover" (Bo Diddley). In the 1960s, Dixon's songs were adapted by numerous rock artists.

== Discography ==
=== Albums ===
| Year | Title | Label | Number | Comments |
|---|---|---|---|---|
| 1959 | Willie's Blues | Bluesville | BVLP-1003 | With Memphis Slim |
| 1960 | Blues Every Which Way | Verve | MGV-3007 | With Memphis Slim |
| 1960 | Songs of Memphis Slim and "Wee Willie" Dixon | Folkways | FW-2385 | |
| 1962 | Memphis Slim and Willie Dixon at the Village Gate | Folkways | FA-2386 | Live, with Pete Seeger |
| 1963 | In Paris: Baby Please Come Home! | Battle | BM-6122 | With Memphis Slim, 1962 |
| 1970 | I Am the Blues | Columbia | PC-9987 | With the Chicago All Stars; also released on DVD, 2003 |
| 1971 | Willie Dixon's Peace? | Yambo | 777-15 | With the Chicago All Stars |
| 1973 | Catalyst | Ovation | OVQD-1433 | Quadraphonic pressing |
| 1976 | What Happened to My Blues | Ovation | OV-1705 | |
| 1983 | Mighty Earthquake and Hurricane | Pausa | PR-7157 | |
| 1985 | Willie Dixon: Live (Backstage Access) | Pausa | PR-7183 | With Sugar Blue, Clifton James, Montreux, Switzerland, 1985 |
| 1988 | Hidden Charms | Bug/Capitol | C1-90593 | Grammy-winning album |
| 1988 | The Chess Box–Willie Dixon | Chess/MCA | CHD2-16500 | Mix of Dixon's own with well-known Chess artists' recordings |
| 1989 | Ginger Ale Afternoon | Varèse Sarabande | VSD-5234 | Soundtrack for movie of the same name |
| 1990 | The Big Three Trio | Columbia/Legacy | C-46216 | Recorded 1947–1952 |
| 1993 | Willie Dixon's Blues Dixonary | Roots | RTS 33046 | EAN: 8712177013760 |
| 1995 | The Original Wang Dang Doodle: The Chess Recordings | Chess/MCA | CHD-9353 | Recorded 1954–1990 (some previously unreleased recordings) |
| 1996 | Crying the Blues: Live in Concert | Thunderbolt | CDTB-166 | Live, with Johnny Winter and the Chicago All Stars, Houston, TX, 1971 |
| 1998 | Good Advice | Wolf | 120,700 | Live, with the Chicago All Stars, Long Beach, CA, 1991 |
| 1998 | I Think I Got the Blues | Prevue | 17 | |
| 2001 | Big Boss Men: Blues Legends of the Sixties | Indigo (UK) | IGOXCD543 | Live, Houston, TX, 1971–72 (six tracks) |
| 2008 | Giant of the Blues | Blues Boulevard | 250196 | EAN: 5413992501960 |

== Sources ==
- Dixon, Willie; Snowden, Don (1990). I Am the Blues. Da Capo Press. ISBN 0-306-80415-8.
- Herzhaft, Gerard (1992). "Willie Dixon". Encyclopedia of the Blues. Fayetteville, Arkansas: University of Arkansas Press. ISBN 1-55728-252-8.
- Mitsutoshi Inaba (2011). Willie Dixon: Preacher of the Blues. Scarecrow Press. ISBN 978-0-8108-6993-6.
- Palmer, Robert (1982). Deep Blues. New York City: Penguin Books. ISBN 0-14006-223-8.
- Dixon, Willie (1992). Willie Dixon: Master Blues Composer, with Notes and Tablature. Hal Leonard. ISBN 0-7935-0305-1.
- Snowden, Don (1997). Willie Dixon: Chess Box (Box set booklet). Willie Dixon. Universal City, California: Chess Records/MCA Records.
- Whitburn, Joel (1988). "Song titles". Top R&B Singles 1942–1988. Menomonee Falls, Wisconsin: Record Research. ISBN 0-89820-068-7.
