= Tones and I discography =

Discography of Australian singer and songwriter, Tones and I

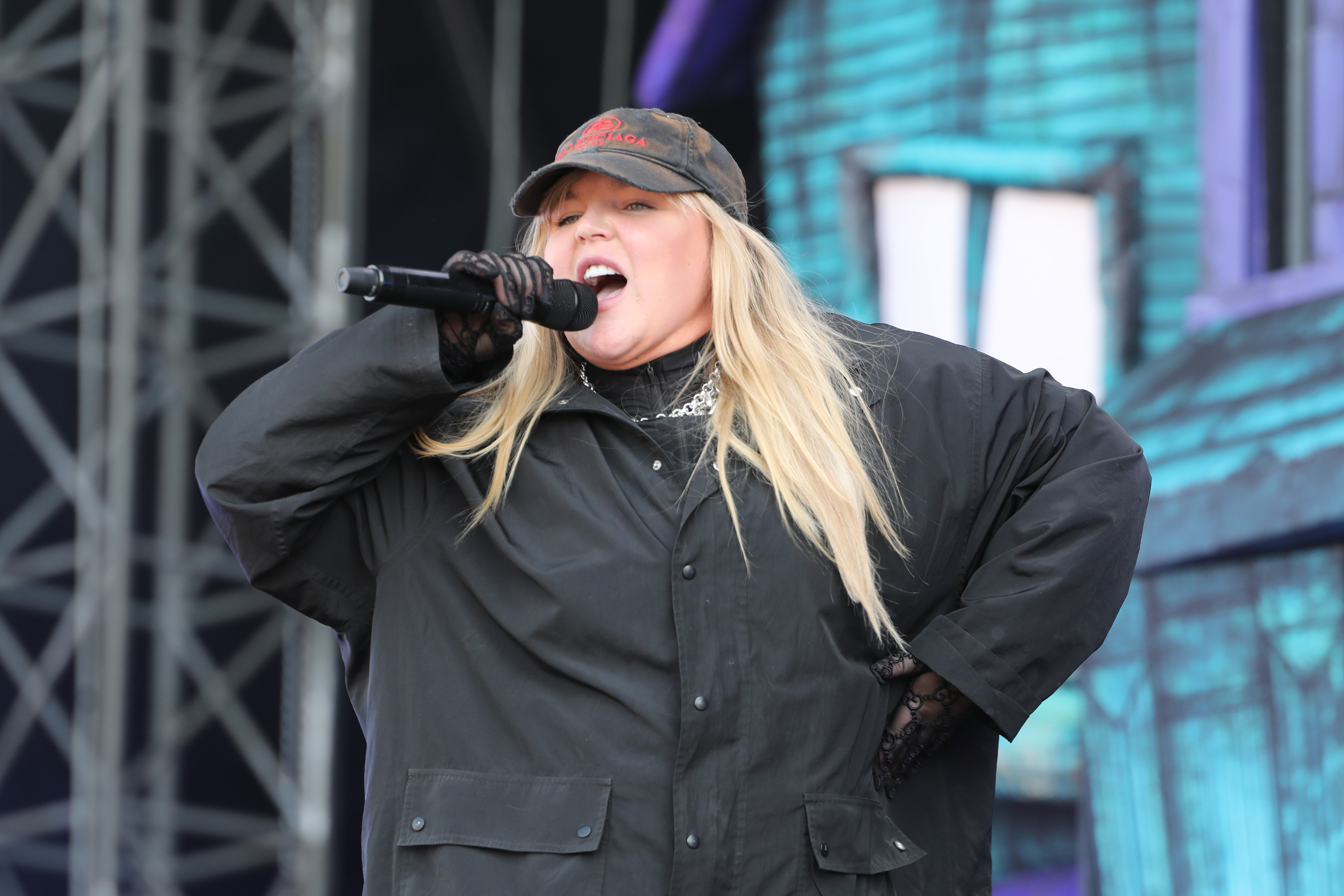
- Tones and I in 2022
- Studio albums: 2
- EPs: 1
- Singles: 28

Australian singer Tones and I has released two studio albums, one extended play, and twenty-eight singles.

== Studio albums ==
List of studio albums, with release date, labels, select chart positions and certifications shown
Title	Album details	Peak chart positions										Certifications
Title	Album details	AUS	BEL (FL)	BEL (WA)	CAN	FRA	GER	NOR	NZ	SWI	US	Certifications
Welcome to the Madhouse	Released: 16 July 2021; Label: Bad Batch, Sony Music Australia; Formats: CD, LP, digital download, streaming	1	124	140	36	107	81	38	39	87	144	BPI: Silver; MC: 2× Platinum; RMNZ: Gold
Beautifully Ordinary	Released: 2 August 2024; Label: Bad Batch, Sony; Formats: CD, LP, digital download, streaming	1	—	—	—	—	—	—	—	—	—	
"—" denotes a recording that did not chart or was not released in that territory.

== Extended plays ==
List of extended plays, with release date, labels, select chart positions and certifications shown
Title	EP details	Peak chart positions										Certifications
Title	EP details	AUS	CAN	DEN	FIN	FRA	IRE	NOR	NZ	SWE	US	Certifications
The Kids Are Coming	Released: 30 August 2019; Label: Bad Batch, Sony; Formats: CD, LP, digital download, streaming	3	9	8	19	31	34	3	23	15	30	ARIA: Platinum; IFPI DEN: Gold; MC: Gold; RIAA: Gold; SNEP: Platinum; RMNZ: 2× Platinum

== Singles ==
List of singles, with year released, selected chart positions and certifications, and album name shown
Title	Year	Peak chart positions										Certifications	Album
Title	Year	AUS	BEL (WA)	GER	IRE	NLD	NZ	SWE	SWI	UK	US	Certifications	Album
"Johnny Run Away"	2019	12	—	—	83	—	—	—	—	—	—	ARIA: 3× Platinum; RMNZ: Gold	The Kids Are Coming
"Dance Monkey"	2019	1	1	1	1	1	1	1	1	1	4	ARIA: 19× Platinum; BEA: 4× Platinum; BPI: 6× Platinum; BVMI: 7× Gold; IFPI SWI: 3× Platinum; RIAA: 4× Platinum; RMNZ: 10× Platinum	The Kids Are Coming
"Never Seen the Rain"	2019	7	3	51	21	19	36	69	49	99	—	ARIA: 6× Platinum; BEA: Platinum; BPI: Silver; RMNZ: 2× Platinum	The Kids Are Coming
"The Kids Are Coming"	2019	65	—	—	—	—	— (Note: "The Kids Are Coming" did not enter the NZ Top 40 Singles Chart, but peaked at number 24 on the NZ Hot Singles Chart.)	—	—	—	—	ARIA: Gold	The Kids Are Coming
"Bad Child"	2020	15	—	—	—	— (Note: "Bad Child" did not enter the Netherlands' Single Top 100 but peaked on the Netherlands' Single Tip Chart at number 27.)	— (Note: "Bad Child" did not enter the NZ Top 40 Singles Chart, but peaked at number five on the NZ Hot Singles Chart.)	79	73	—	—	ARIA: 3× Platinum; RMNZ: Gold	Non-album singles
"Can't Be Happy All the Time"	2020	— (Note: "Can't Be Happy All the Time" did not enter the Australian Top 100 singles but did peak at number 19 on the Australian Digital Tracks chart.)	—	—	—	—	— (Note: "Can't Be Happy All the Time" did not enter the NZ Top 40 Singles Chart, but peaked at number 27 on the NZ Hot Singles Chart.)	—	—	—	—		Non-album singles
"Ur So F**king Cool"	2020	44	26	37	—	47	— (Note: "Ur So F**king Cool" did not enter the NZ Top 40 Singles Chart, but peaked at number nine on the NZ Hot Singles Chart.)	— (Note: While "Ur So F**king Cool" did not enter the Swedish Singles Chart, it peaked at number three on the Swedish Heatseeker Chart.)	93	—	—	ARIA: Gold	Non-album singles
"Fly Away"	2020	4	27	44	10	— (Note: "Fly Away" did not enter the Netherlands' Single Top 100 but peaked on the Netherlands' Single Tip Chart at number 9.)	37	29	30	11	—	ARIA: 3× Platinum; BPI: Platinum; BVMI: Gold; RMNZ: 3× Platinum	Welcome to the Madhouse
"Won't Sleep"	2021	77	—	—	—	—	— (Note: "Won't Sleep" did not enter the NZ Top 40 Singles Chart, but peaked at number 19 on the NZ Hot Singles Chart.)	— (Note: "Won't Sleep" did not enter the Swedish Singellista Chart, but peaked at number one on the Swedish Heatseeker Chart.)	—	—	—		Welcome to the Madhouse
"Cloudy Day"	2021	31	33	—	—	—	— (Note: "Cloudy Day" did not enter the NZ Top 40 Singles Chart, but peaked at number 26 on the NZ Hot Singles Chart.)	— (Note: "Cloudy Day" did not enter the Swedish Singellista Chart, but peaked at number 12 on the Swedish Heatseeker Chart.)	—	—	—	ARIA: Platinum; BPI: Silver; RMNZ: Gold	Welcome to the Madhouse
"Eyes Don't Lie"	2022	— (Note: "Eyes Don't Lie" did not enter the Australian Top 100 singles but did peak at number 14 on the Australian Artist Singles chart.)	—	—	—	—	— (Note: "Eyes Don't Lie" did not enter the NZ Top 40 Singles Chart, but peaked at number 22 on the NZ Hot Singles Chart.)	—	— (Note: "Eyes Don't Lie" did not enter the Swiss Singles chart, but charted at number 69 on the Swiss Airplay chart.)	—	—		Non-album single
"Chant" (with Macklemore)	2022	81	—	—	—	—	— (Note: "Chant" did not enter the NZ Top 40 Singles Chart, but peaked at number eight on the NZ Hot Singles Chart.)	—	—	—	— (Note: "Chant" did not enter the US Billboard Hot 100 but peaked on the US Digital Songs chart at number 31.)		Ben
"Charlie"	2022	—	—	—	—	—	— (Note: "Charlie" did not enter the NZ Top 40 Singles Chart, but peaked at number 23 on the NZ Hot Singles Chart.)	—	—	—	—		Non-album single
"I Made It"	2023	— (Note: "I Made It" did not enter the Australian ARIA Singles Chart but peaked at number 16 on the ARIA Digital Track Chart.)	—	—	—	—	— (Note: "I Made It" did not enter the NZ Top 40 Singles Chart, but peaked at number 37 on the NZ Hot Singles Chart.)	—	—	—	—		True Spirit (soundtrack)
"I Am Free"	2023	— (Note: "I Am Free" did not enter the Australian ARIA Singles Chart but peaked at number nine on the ARIA Digital Track Chart.)	—	—	—	—	— (Note: "I Am Free" did not enter the NZ Top 40 Singles Chart, but peaked at number 36 on the NZ Hot Singles Chart.)	—	—	—	—		Non-album singles
"House for Kings" (with Sam Feldt)	2023	—	—	—	—	—	—	—	—	—	—		Time After Time
"Bring It On" (with Bia and Diarra Sylla)	2023	—	—	—	—	—	— (Note: "Bring It On" did not enter the NZ Top 40 Singles Chart, but peaked at number 40 on the NZ Hot Singles Chart.)	—	—	—	—		Non-album singles
"The Greatest"	2023	—	—	—	—	—	— (Note: "The Greatest" did not enter the NZ Top 40 Singles Chart, but peaked at number 20 on the NZ Hot Singles Chart.)	—	—	—	—		Non-album singles
"Dreaming"	2024	— (Note: "Dreaming" did not enter the Australian ARIA Singles Chart but peaked at number 50 on the ARIA Digital Track Chart.)	—	—	—	—	—	—	—	—	—		Beautifully Ordinary
"I Get High"	2024	— (Note: "I Get High" did not enter the Australian ARIA Singles Chart but peaked at number 22 on the ARIA Digital Track Chart.)	—	—	—	—	— (Note: "I Get High" did not enter the NZ Top 40 Singles Chart, but peaked at number 25 on the NZ Hot Singles Chart.)	—	—	—	—		Beautifully Ordinary
"Down Under"	2024	— (Note: "Down Under" did not enter the Australian top 100 ARIA Singles Chart but peaked at number eight on the ARIA Digital Track Chart.)	—	—	—	—	—	—	—	—	—		Non-album single
"Wonderful"	2024	—	—	—	—	—	— (Note: "Wonderful" did not enter the NZ Top 40 Singles Chart, but peaked at number 27 on the NZ Hot Singles Chart.)	—	—	—	—		Beautifully Ordinary
"Dance with Me"	2024	— (Note: "Dance with Me" did not enter the Australian ARIA Singles Chart but peaked at number 25 on the ARIA Digital Track Chart.)	—	—	—	—	— (Note: "Dance with Me" did not enter the NZ Top 40 Singles Chart, but peaked at number 37 on the NZ Hot Singles Chart.)	—	—	—	—		Beautifully Ordinary
"(Can't Get You) Off My Mind" (with Chaii and Young Franco)	2024	—	—	—	—	—	—	—	—	—	—		Non-album single
"To Be Loved"	2024	—	—	—	—	—	— (Note: "To Be Loved" did not enter the NZ Top 40 Singles Chart, but peaked at number 26 on the NZ Hot Singles Chart.)	—	—	—	—		Beautifully Ordinary
"Hallelujah"	2024	—	—	—	—	—	—	—	—	—	—		Non-album singles
"Hideaway" (with Switch Disco)	2025	—	—	—	—	—	—	—	—	— (Note: "Hideaway" did not enter the UK Singles Chart, but peaked at number 54 on the UK Single Sales Chart.)	—		Non-album singles
"Gone Gone Gone" (with David Guetta and Teddy Swims)	2025	85	4	21	—	24	— (Note: "Gone Gone Gone" did not enter the NZ Top 40 Singles Chart, but peaked at number 2 on the NZ Hot Singles Chart.)	85	48	47	51	BPI: Silver; RMNZ: Gold	Non-album singles
"Favour" (with Fisher)	2026	— (Note: "Favour" did not enter the Australian ARIA Singles Chart but peaked at number 4 on the Australian Artist Chart.)	—	—	—	—	— (Note: "Favour" did not enter the NZ Top 40 Singles Chart, but peaked at number 3 on the NZ Hot Singles Chart.)	—	—	100	—		Non-album singles
"Mercy"	2026	— (Note: "Mercy" did not enter the ARIA top 100 Singles Chart, but peaked at number 7 on the Australian Artist Chart.)	—	—	—	—	—	—	—	—	—		Non-album singles
"Time After Time" (with Cyril and Cyndi Lauper)	2026	—	—	—	—	—	—	—	—	—	—		Non-album singles
"—" denotes a recording that did not chart or was not released in that territory.

== Other charted songs ==
List of other charted songs, with year released, selected chart positions and certifications, and album name shown
Title	Year	Peak chart positions		Certifications	Album
Title	Year	AUS	NZ Hot	Certifications	Album
"Jimmy"	2019	79	29	ARIA: Gold	The Kids Are Coming
"Just a Mess"	2021	—	36		Welcome to the Madhouse
"—" denotes a recording that did not chart or was not released in that territory.
