= Welcome to the Madhouse =

Studio album by Tones and I
- Released: 16 July 2021
- Genre: Pop
- Length: 46:29
- Labels: Bad Batch; Warner Music Australia; Elektra Records
- Producers: Capi; Dann Hume; Konstantin Kersting; Randy Belculfine; Toni Watson

Tones and I chronology
The Kids Are Coming (2019)	Welcome to the Madhouse (2021)	Beautifully Ordinary (2024)

Singles from Welcome to the Madhouse
- 1. "Fly Away" Released: 13 November 2020; 2. "Won't Sleep" Released: 14 May 2021; 3. "Cloudy Day" Released: 10 June 2021

Professional ratings
Review scores
Source	Rating
AllMusic	4/5 stars
The Arts Desk	3/5 stars
The AU Review	3.5/5 stars
The Guardian	2/5 stars
The Sydney Morning Herald	4/5 stars
Sputnikmusic	0.5/5

Welcome to the Madhouse is the debut studio album by Australian singer and songwriter Tones and I, released on 16 July 2021 through Bad Batch Records. The album debuted at number 1 on the ARIA Charts.

At the 2021 ARIA Music Awards, the album was nominated for Album of the Year and Best Artist, while Giulia Giannini McGauran & Mitchell Eaton were nominated for Best Cover Art for their work on this album. At the J Awards of 2021, the album was nominated for Australian Album of the Year.

== Background ==
Welcome to the Madhouse is Watson's debut album, and her first body of work since her debut EP The Kids Are Coming (2019), which featured the commercially successful single "Dance Monkey". In an interview with MTV News, she said the album would be predominantly self-produced, saying: "These songs are completely me and my own production. It's not swayed by other songwriters or by anyone that's trying to help me get a hit, because that's never been important to me."

Watson chose to add five additional songs to the record as a result of having spare time to do so. She stated: "I've taken the time to just really make sure it's what I want. And I want to add more music to the album. It will be my first ever album, so I really want to make sure I'm proud of it."

== Recording ==
Watson began recording for her debut album in early 2020, before suffering delays as a result of the Stage Four lockdown in Melbourne, which was enforced due to the COVID-19 pandemic. Elaborating in an interview about the recording sessions, Watson stated:

"I couldn't record a lot of the time in Melbourne; I wasn't allowed to leave the house. The music I wrote before I had to stop, because of the really intense lockdown, was really weird! I wrote this song called "Welcome to the Madhouse"; I just wrote three or four really weird songs, that I'd never written like that before. I explained it like trying to pull inspiration from living Groundhog Day over and over again!"

She went on to finish recording for the album following the end of the lockdown.

== Release ==
On 25 February 2020, Billboard revealed that Watson was finalising her debut album.

On 1 September 2020, Watson revealed details of her forthcoming album on an online press conference, stating that she planned to release the album sometime in the forthcoming two to three months. She'd initially intended to release the album in August of that year.

On 13 November 2020, in an interview accompanying the premiere of "Fly Away" on Triple J's Breakfast with Bryce Mills, Watson revealed that the single was the first from her debut album.

On 13 May 2021, alongside the worldwide premiere of "Won't Sleep" on Triple J's Hobba & Hing, Watson confirmed the album and shared its title. She revealed the album's release date on 7 June 2021.

== Promotion ==
=== Singles ===
Welcome to the Madhouse was preceded by three singles. "Fly Away" was released as the album's lead single on 13 November 2020 and peaked at number 4 on the ARIA Singles Chart. "Won't Sleep" was released as the album's second single on 14 May 2021 and peaked at number 77 on the ARIA Singles Chart. "Cloudy Day" was released as the album's third single on 10 June 2021 and peaked at number 31 on the ARIA Singles Chart.

== Track listing ==
All tracks are written by Toni Watson.

Welcome to the Madhouse track listing
No.	Title	Producer(s)	Length
1.	"Welcome to the Madhouse"	Toni Watson; Dann Hume; Randy Belculfine	2:36
2.	"Lonely"	Watson; Belculfine	3:44
3.	"Won't Sleep"	Watson; Belculfine	3:17
4.	"Westside Lobby"	Watson; Capi	3:39
5.	"Fly Away"	Watson; Hume	2:58
6.	"Sad Songs"	Watson; Belculfine	3:14
7.	"Just a Mess"	Watson; Belculfine	3:51
8.	"Child's Play"	Watson; Belculfine	3:39
9.	"Not Going Home"	Watson; Hume	3:31
10.	"Dark Waters"	Watson; Konstantin Kersting	3:34
11.	"Cloudy Day"	Watson; Hume	3:05
12.	"You Don't Know My Name"	Watson; Hume; Belculfine	3:14
13.	"Fall Apart"	Watson; Hume	4:08
14.	"Bars (RIP T)"	Watson; Belculfine	1:59
Total length:			46:29

Japanese edition bonus tracks
No.	Title	Producer(s)	Length
15.	"Fly Away" (Jonas Blue Remix)	Watson; Hume; Jonas Blue	3:13
16.	"Ur So F**king Cool" (Top of the Pops Radio Edit 2021)	Watson; Steve Mac	2:53
Total length:			52:47

Deluxe edition bonus tracks – The Kids Are Coming
No.	Title	Producer(s)	Length
15.	"The Kids Are Coming"	Watson	3:24
16.	"Dance Monkey"	Kersting	3:29
17.	"Colourblind"	Watson	3:26
18.	"Johnny Run Away"	Kersting	3:12
19.	"Jimmy"	Kersting	3:43
20.	"Never Seen the Rain"	Kersting	3:20

== Personnel ==
Credits are based on the deluxe version track listing.

- Toni Watson – vocals, all instruments
- Andrei Eremin – mastering
- Dann Hume – mixing (tracks 1, 4, 5, 9, 11–13), programming (5)
- Randy Belculfine – mixing (2, 3, 6–8, 14, 15), engineering (1–3, 6–8, 11–15)
- Konstantin Kersting – mixing (10, 16, 18–20), engineering (16, 18–20)
- Kenny Harmon – mixing, engineering (17)
- Daniel Frizza – engineering (1, 2, 6, 11)
- Richard Stolz – engineering (1, 4, 9, 10)
- Garrett Kato – vocal engineering (16)
- The Cho1r – choir (1, 2, 6)

== Charts ==
=== Weekly charts ===
Chart performance for Welcome to the Madhouse
Chart (2021)	Peak position
Australian Albums (ARIA)	1
Belgian Albums (Ultratop Flanders)	124
Belgian Albums (Ultratop Wallonia)	140
Canadian Albums (Billboard)	36
French Albums (SNEP)	107
German Albums (Offizielle Top 100)	81
New Zealand Albums (RMNZ)	38
Norwegian Albums (VG-lista)	39
Swiss Albums (Schweizer Hitparade)	87
US Billboard 200	144

=== Year-end charts ===
Chart (2021)	Position
Australian Artist Albums (ARIA)	27

== Certifications ==
Certifications for Welcome to the Madhouse
Region	Certification	Certified units/sales
Canada (Music Canada)	2× Platinum	160,000^{‡}
New Zealand (RMNZ)	Gold	7,500^{‡}
United Kingdom (BPI)	Silver	60,000^{‡}
^{‡} Sales+streaming figures based on certification alone.

== Release history ==
Release history and formats for Welcome to the Madhouse
Region	Date	Format	Label	Catalogue	Ref.
Various	16 July 2021	Digital download; streaming	Bad Batch; Sony Music Australia	Not applicable	
Australia	16 July 2021	CD	Bad Batch; Sony Music Australia	19439888152	
Australia	16 July 2021	LP	Bad Batch; Sony Music Australia	19439888151	
Australia	16 July 2021	LP (JB Hi-Fi exclusive orange edition)	Bad Batch; Sony Music Australia	19439888171	
New Zealand	16 July 2021	CD	Bad Batch	19439888152	
New Zealand	16 July 2021	LP	Bad Batch	19439888151	
New Zealand	16 July 2021	LP (JB Hi-Fi exclusive orange edition)	Bad Batch	19439888171	
