= Bad Child =

2020 song by Tones and I

- Double A-side cover

Single by Tones and I
- Released: 12 March 2020
- Length: 3:41
- Label: Bad Batch; Sony Music; Elektra
- Songwriter: Toni Watson
- Producers: Konstantin Kersting; Watson

Tones and I singles chronology
"The Kids Are Coming" (2019)	"Bad Child" / "Can't Be Happy All the Time" (2020)	"Ur So F**king Cool" (2020)

Lyric video
- "Bad Child" on YouTube

"Bad Child" is a song by Australian singer Toni Watson, known professionally as Tones and I. It was released on 12 March 2020 through Bad Batch Records, distributed by Sony Music in Australia and New Zealand and globally by Elektra Records, alongside the song "Can't Be Happy All the Time". The double A-side single marks the first of more releases throughout the year, as announced by Watson.

At the APRA Music Awards of 2021, the song was shortlisted for Song of the Year.

== Background ==
On 11 March 2020, Watson announced that there would be new music coming the next day. The song's release, along with "Can't Be Happy All the Time", was accompanied by an animated lyric video. The singer revealed that, for the first time, she has written a song "in someone else's shoes; writing from their perspective". She further explained that the song is about "seeing life growing up through someone else's eyes".

== Music video ==
The live action music video was produced by Visible Studios, Directed by Nick Kozakis and Liam Kelly, and released on 9 April 2020. The video features a young boy 'Jimmy' falling into a confusing dream world where he looks back at past traumas, before ultimately being rescued by 'Young Tones'.

== Critical reception ==
Debbie Carr of Triple J felt "Bad Child" was a trademark Tones and I song with Watson's "fingerprints all over it", and favourably compared the lyrical content to "Johnny Run Away". On the other hand, Lars Brandle of Billboard thought the track with its "punchy keys and fat bass, all sitting under Tones' powerhouse vocals" was reminiscent of Watson's previous hit "Dance Monkey". Idolator's Mike Wass called the song a "bop" and predicted it to be "all over radio in a couple of months". Based on the song title, he described the song to be "introspective and tinged with sadness".

== Track listing ==
All tracks are written by Toni Watson.

No.	Title	Length
1.	"Bad Child"	3:41
2.	"Can't Be Happy All the Time"	4:16

== Personnel ==
Credits adapted from Tidal.

- Toni Watson – songwriting, co-production
- Konstantin Kersting – co-production, mixing
- Andrei Eremin – mastering
- Randy Belculfine – recording

== Charts ==
=== Weekly charts ===
Chart (2020)	Peak position
Australia (ARIA)	15
Czech Republic Airplay (ČNS IFPI)	59
Hot Canadian Digital Song Sales (Billboard)	39
Iceland (Tónlistinn)	12
Mexico Ingles Airplay (Billboard)	14
New Zealand Hot Singles (RMNZ)	5
Norway (VG-lista)	13
Sweden (Sverigetopplistan)	79
Switzerland (Schweizer Hitparade)	73
US Bubbling Under Hot 100 (Billboard)	19

=== Year-end charts ===
Chart (2020)	Position
Australia (ARIA)	85

== Certifications ==
Region	Certification	Certified units/sales
Australia (ARIA)	3× Platinum	210,000^{‡}
New Zealand (RMNZ)	Gold	15,000^{‡}
Poland (ZPAV)	Gold	25,000^{‡}
^{‡} Sales+streaming figures based on certification alone.
