= Dance with Me (Tones and I song) =

2024 single by Tones and I

"Dance With Me"

Single by Tones and I

from the album Beautifully Ordinary
- Released: 17 June 2024
- Length: 3:45
- Label: Bad Batch; Sony
- Songwriter: Toni Watson
- Producers: Toni Watson; Randy Belculfine

Tones and I singles chronology
"Wonderful" (2024)	"Dance With Me" (2024)	"(Can't Get You) Off My Mind" (2024)

Music video
- "Dance with Me" on YouTube

"Dance with Me" is a song by Australian singer and songwriter Tones and I. It was released on 17 June 2024 as the fourth single from her second studio album, Beautifully Ordinary.

Upon release, Tones and I said "The chorus symbolises waiting in the past for someone that's moved on emotionally, the 'dancing' represents your happiest moment with someone and staying in the moment in a last desperate effort to reconnect with them. It's a lonely song but sounds happy."

At the 2024 ARIA Music Awards, the Tones and I, Nick Kozakis and Sela Vai directed video won the ARIA Award for Best Video. The song was shorted listed for Best Single at the 2025 Rolling Stone Australia Awards.

== Charts ==
Chart performance for "Dance with Me"
Chart (2024)	Peak position
Australia Digital Track Chart (ARIA)	25
New Zealand Hot Singles (RMNZ)	37
