= The Kids Are Coming (song) =

Single by Tones and I

from the EP The Kids Are Coming
- Released: 27 September 2019
- Length: 3:24
- Label: Bad Batch
- Songwriter: Toni Watson
- Producer: Konstantin Kersting

Tones and I singles chronology
"Never Seen the Rain" (2019)	"The Kids Are Coming" (2019)	"Bad Child" / "Can't Be Happy All the Time" (2020)

Music video
- "The Kids Are Coming" on YouTube

"The Kids Are Coming" is a song by Australian singer Tones and I, released to Australian and German radio on 27 September 2019 as the fourth single from her debut EP of the same name. The song's title was believed to be based on the hashtag and working title "The kids are coming" used by Neil Goss with his 2015 book Juvenile Delinquents and the 2020 movie of the same name.

On 28 September 2019, Tones and I performed the song at the 2019 AFL Grand Final alongside "Dance Monkey".

== Critical reception ==
In a review of the EP, Zoë Radas from Stack said "This electrifying song is less a call-to-arms than an assurance of imminent arrival; Toni Watson (Tones and I) doesn't need to marshal anyone, because this tribe is already organically united in their shared beliefs. [...] Watson displays a Sia-like confidence in the way she hurls, tweaks and growls her lyrics of damnation at the socio-political status quo".

== Music video ==
The music video was produced by Reprobates, directed by Alan Del Rio Ortiz and released on 25 September 2019.

== Charts ==
Chart (2019)	Peak position
Australia (ARIA)	65
New Zealand Hot Singles (RMNZ)	29

== Certifications ==
Region	Certification	Certified units/sales
Australia (ARIA)	Gold	35,000^{‡}
^{‡} Sales+streaming figures based on certification alone.

== Release history ==
Region	Date	Format(s)	Label
Australia, Germany	27 September 2019	Radio; streaming; digital download	Bad Batch
