= Cloudy Day =

2021 single by Tones and I

Single by Tones and I

from the album Welcome to the Madhouse
- Released: 10 June 2021
- Length: 3:05
- Label: Bad Batch; Sony Music Australia; Elektra
- Songwriter: Toni Watson
- Producers: Watson; Dann Hume

Tones and I singles chronology
"Won't Sleep" (2021)	"Cloudy Day" (2021)	"Eyes Don't Lie" (2022)

Music video
- "Cloudy Day" on YouTube

"Cloudy Day" is a song by Australian singer Tones and I. It was released on 10 June 2021 through Bad Batch Records, distributed by Sony Music in Australia and New Zealand and globally by Elektra Records as the third single from her debut studio album, Welcome to the Madhouse.

At the 2022 ARIA Music Awards, the song won for Song of the Year.

It has later been used in the 2023 animated film Migration and during an episode of Beavis and Butt-Head.

== Background ==
Discussing the song's origins, Tones and I said that after her friend Ben Tournier (aka "T") died in January 2021, she was struggling to complete her album. She was called into Denis Handlin's office (the then-CEO of Sony Music Australia) who told her this saying from his late mother — "on a cloudy day, look up into the sky and find the sun". Tones said "I knew I wanted to use that as a lyric and the next time I went into the studio I wrote 'Cloudy Day'".

== Critical reception ==
Greta Brereton from NME opined that the song "is reminiscent of her 2020 "Fly Away", saying it features "soaring chorus crescendos and choir-style vocal accompaniment, big brass and rhythmic clapping add to the gospel feel of the track, which also arrived alongside an animated music video". Leena Tailor from Variety called the song "the perfect pandemic anthem".

== Charts ==
=== Weekly charts ===
Weekly chart performance for "Cloudy Day"
Chart (2021)	Peak position
Australia (ARIA)	31
Belgium (Ultratop 50 Wallonia)	33
Japan Hot Overseas (Billboard)	18
Mexico Ingles Airplay (Billboard)	26
New Zealand Hot Singles (RMNZ)	26
US Adult Pop Airplay (Billboard)	31
US Hot Rock & Alternative Songs (Billboard)	47
US Pop Airplay (Billboard)	35

=== Year-end charts ===
Year-end chart performance for "Cloudy Day"
Chart (2021)	Position
Australian Artist (ARIA)	22

== Certifications ==
Region	Certification	Certified units/sales
Australia (ARIA)	Platinum	70,000^{‡}
New Zealand (RMNZ)	Gold	15,000^{‡}
United Kingdom (BPI)	Silver	200,000^{‡}
^{‡} Sales+streaming figures based on certification alone.
