= The Kids Are Coming =

EP by Tones and I
- Released: 30 August 2019
- Recorded: 2018–19
- Length: 20:40
- Labels: Bad Batch; Sony Australia
- Producer: Konstantin Kersting

Tones and I chronology
The Kids Are Coming (2019)	Welcome to the Madhouse (2021)

Singles from The Kids Are Coming
- 1. "Johnny Run Away" Released: 1 March 2019; 2. "Dance Monkey" Released: 10 May 2019; 3. "Never Seen the Rain" Released: 16 July 2019; 4. "The Kids Are Coming" Released: 27 September 2019

The Kids Are Coming is the debut extended play by Australian singer Tones and I. The EP was released on 30 August 2019. The EP was announced on 16 July 2019, alongside the release of single "Never Seen the Rain". At the ARIA Music Awards of 2019, the EP won ARIA Award for Best Independent Release. At the AIR Awards of 2020, the EP was nominated for Best Independent Pop Album or EP. All six songs from the EP were later included on the deluxe edition of Tones and I's debut album, Welcome to the Madhouse (2021).

== Track listing ==
All songs are written by Toni Watson and produced by Konstantin Kersting.

No.	Title	Length
1.	"The Kids Are Coming"	3:24
2.	"Dance Monkey"	3:29
3.	"Colourblind"	3:26
4.	"Johnny Run Away"	3:12
5.	"Jimmy"	3:43
6.	"Never Seen the Rain"	3:20
Total length:		20:40

Japanese edition bonus track
No.	Title	Length
7.	"Dance Monkey (Stripped Back)"	2:51
Total length:		23:31

== Personnel ==
Credits adapted from AllMusic.

- Toni Watson – composer, vocals
- Konstantin Kersting – mixing, production
- Kenny Harmon – mixing
- Randy Belculfine – mixing
- Andrei Eremin – mastering

== Charts ==
=== Weekly charts ===
Chart (2019–2020)	Peak position
Australian Albums (ARIA)	3
Australian Independent Label Albums (AIR)	1
Austrian Albums (Ö3 Austria)	48
Belgian Albums (Ultratop Flanders)	46
Belgian Albums (Ultratop Wallonia)	95
Canadian Albums (Billboard)	9
Danish Albums (Hitlisten)	8
Dutch Albums (Album Top 100)	96
Finnish Albums (Suomen virallinen lista)	19
French Albums (SNEP)	31
Irish Albums (IRMA)	40
Italian Albums (FIMI)	72
Japanese Albums (Oricon)	137
Latvian Albums (LAIPA)	9
New Zealand Albums (RMNZ)	23
Norwegian Albums (VG-lista)	3
Swedish Albums (Sverigetopplistan)	15
Swiss Albums (Schweizer Hitparade)	82
US Billboard 200	30

=== Year-end charts ===
Chart (2019)	Position
Australian Albums (ARIA)	21
French Albums (SNEP)	150
Swedish Albums (Sverigetopplistan)	96
Chart (2020)	Position
Australian Albums (ARIA)	39
Canadian Albums (Billboard)	16
Czech Albums (ČNS IFPI)	4
French Albums (SNEP)	88
US Billboard 200	92

== Certifications ==
Region	Certification	Certified units/sales
Australia (ARIA)	Platinum	70,000^{‡}
Canada (Music Canada)	Gold	40,000^{‡}
Denmark (IFPI Danmark)	Gold	10,000^{‡}
France (SNEP)	Platinum	100,000^{‡}
New Zealand (RMNZ)	2× Platinum	30,000^{‡}
United States (RIAA)	Gold	500,000^{‡}
^{‡} Sales+streaming figures based on certification alone.

== Release history ==
Region	Date	Format	Label	Catalogue
Australia	30 August 2019	Digital download; streaming; CD; LP	Bad Batch; Sony Australia	19075979252 / 19075979257
Japan	5 February 2020	CD	Warner Music Japan	
