= Ur So F**king Cool =

2020 song by Tones and I

Single by Tones and I

from the album Welcome to the Madhouse (Japanese Edition)
- Released: 29 May 2020
- Length: 2:53
- Label: Bad Batch; Sony Music; Elektra; Warner Music
- Songwriter: Toni Watson
- Producers: Tones and I; Steve Mac

Tones and I singles chronology
"Bad Child" / "Can't Be Happy All the Time" (2020)	"Ur So F**king Cool" (2020)	"Fly Away" (2020)

Music video
- "Ur So F**king Cool" on YouTube

"Ur So F**king Cool" (stylized on the album cover as "Ur So F**kInG cOoL", renamed "Ur So Cool" on clean versions) is a song by Australian singer Tones and I. It was released on 29 May 2020 by Bad Batch Records and distributed by Sony Music in Australia and New Zealand and globally by Elektra Records. It was written by Toni Watson (p.k.a. Tones and I).

== Background ==
In May 2020 Tones and I explained to Poppy Reid of Rolling Stone (Australia), that "You're So Fucking Cool", is about a party she attended in Los Angeles. Reid observed, "there are elements of her true self in the music: frustration, longing, loneliness, playfulness." Tones announced the release of the song on 26 May 2020.

== Critical reception ==
The song was panned by critics and was included on a list of the worst songs of 2020 published by Insider; its lyrics were described as "condescending and bitter".

== Music video ==
The music video was released on 29 May 2020, and was directed by Tones and I, Nick Kozakis and Liam Kelly. The cover art for the single depicts the artist in seven different guises: all appear in the music video. Tones and I was able to appear as multiple characters in one scene due to the use of a robotic camera that filmed duplicated shots over a 3-day period. The music video was nominated for Best Video at the ARIA Music Awards of 2020.

== Charts ==
=== Weekly charts ===
Chart (2020–2021)	Peak position
Australia (ARIA)	44
Austria (Ö3 Austria Top 40)	21
Belgium (Ultratip Bubbling Under Flanders)	21
Belgium (Ultratop 50 Wallonia)	26
Canada Hot 100 (Billboard)	95
Canada CHR/Top 40 (Billboard)	48
Czech Republic Airplay (ČNS IFPI)	7
France (SNEP)	167
Germany (GfK)	37
Mexico Airplay (Billboard)	44
Netherlands (Dutch Top 40)	24
Netherlands (Single Top 100)	47
New Zealand Hot Singles (RMNZ)	9
Slovakia Airplay (ČNS IFPI)	38
Sweden Heatseeker (Sverigetopplistan)	3
Switzerland (Schweizer Hitparade)	93
US Hot Rock & Alternative Songs (Billboard)	23

=== Year-end charts ===
Chart (2020)	Position
Austria (Ö3 Austria Top 40)	72
US Hot Rock & Alternative Songs (Billboard)	99

== Certifications ==
Region	Certification	Certified units/sales
Australia (ARIA)	Gold	35,000^{‡}
^{‡} Sales+streaming figures based on certification alone.

== Release history ==
Region	Date	Format(s)	Label	Ref.
Various	29 May 2020	Streaming; digital download	Bad Batch	
Australia	29 May 2020	Contemporary hit radio	Sony	
Italy	5 June 2020	Contemporary hit radio	Warner	
United States	16 June 2020	Contemporary hit radio	Elektra	
United States	16 June 2020	Alternative radio	Elektra	
