= Charlie (Tones and I song) =

2022 single by Tones and I

Single by Tones and I
- Released: 12 August 2022
- Length: 3:04
- Label: Bad Batch; Sony Music Australia
- Songwriter(s): Toni Watson; Eren Cannata; Sam Homaee
- Producer(s): Toni Watson; Eren Cannata; Sam Homaee

Tones and I singles chronology
"Chant" (2022)	"Charlie" (2022)	"Dreaming" (2024)

Music video
- "Charlie (Live video)" on YouTube

"Charlie" is a song by Australian singer Tones and I. It was released on 12 August 2022 through Bad Batch Records, distributed by Sony Music Australia after its debut on Jimmy Kimmel Live! on 9 August 2022.

The song is named after Tones and I's labrador, 'Charlie'. Tones and I told Triple J the song was inspired by her missing Charlie during a three-month stint in Los Angeles, "I was like 'I wonder what Charlie's doing right now? What does he get up to? Does he sneak out at night and go party with the other dogs?'".

== Charts ==
Weekly chart performance for "Charlie"
Chart (2022)	Peak position
New Zealand Hot Singles (RMNZ)	23
