= Beautifully Ordinary =

Studio album by Tones and I
- Released: 2 August 2024
- Length: 63:33
- Label: Bad Batch; Sony Australia
- Producer: Jenna Andrews; Randy Belculfine; Jacob Farah; Jerome Farah; Joel Farland; Sam Nelson Harris; Stephen Kirk; Rick Nowels; Toni Watson; Xander

Tones and I chronology
Welcome to the Madhouse (2021)	Beautifully Ordinary (2024)

Singles from Beautifully Ordinary
- 1. "Dreaming" Released: 2 February 2024; 2. "I Get High" Released: 12 March 2024; 3. "Wonderful" Released: 17 May 2024; 4. "Dance with Me" Released: 17 June 2024; 5. "To Be Loved" Released: 2 August 2024

Beautifully Ordinary is the second studio album by Australian singer and songwriter Tones and I, released on 2 August 2024, through Bad Batch Records.

At the 2024 ARIA Music Awards, the album was nominated for Best Cover Art, while Tones and I was nominated for Best Solo Artist.

== Background ==
"There was never a theme or tone I aspired to", Tones and I said of recording Beautifully Ordinary. "Each song is a different story, meant for its own moment. Some songs have been inspired by the same life experience, but through a different perspective. Mostly the album presents itself as whatever the listener takes from it. There's an undertone of loneliness, heartbreak, desperation, fear, vulnerability, and triumph (but not too much)". She added that "the brightest songs have the saddest stories", and noted that nostalgia appears as a recurring theme throughout the record, though unintentionally, reflecting how the past continues to shape who she is today. Beautifully Ordinary follows her debut album, Welcome to the Madhouse (2021). Describing the project as "a way of embracing who I am", she noted that her refusal to conform in her career may have been behind both her rapid rise and decline. Yet, she acknowledged that staying true to herself has ultimately allowed her to feel stronger and more at ease with where she stands today.

In discussing the recording of the album, Tones and I explained that she did not set out with a specific theme or tone for the album. Instead, each track was written as a distinct story intended for its own moment. Some songs were inspired by the same life experience but approached from different perspectives. She added that the album is open to interpretation by the listener, though it carries undertones of loneliness, heartbreak, desperation, fear, vulnerability, and moments of triumph.

== Promotion ==
The album was announced on 17 June 2024, and will be supported by an Australian and New Zealand tour, commencing in August 2024.

=== Singles ===
Beautifully Ordinary was preceded by four singles. "Dreaming" was released on 2 February 2024. Upon release, Tones and I said "'Dreaming is the first song from my upcoming album. I maintain my integrity in my stories, which always come from a genuine place of love, loss, and hope. I have found myself subconsciously writing about things I've never written about before." "I Get High" was released on 12 March 2024. Upon release, Tones and I said "'I Get High' is about the nostalgia of growing up with friends. Sneaking out and enjoying our youth, looking back and reminiscing about the people that were and are in your life, that make you feel alive. There is magic in this song." "Wonderful" was released on 17 May 2024. Tones and I said the song is "About a very close person in my life. I wanted to let them know just how incredible they were, at times where they may have felt like they weren't good enough." The album's fourth single, "Dance With Me" was released on 17 June 2024, the same day as the album was announced. "To Be Loved" was added to radio on 2 August 2024 as the album's fifth single.

== Reception ==
Josh Sharpe from Broadway World said "Co-produced by Tones and I and featuring her as the sole writer on nearly every song, this album captures her artistic evolution and personal growth, blending her distinctive vocal style with vulnerable storytelling." Zoë Radas from JB Hi-Fi's Stack Magazine said "There are fewer of the caricatures she previously used as veils on debut LP Welcome to the Madhouse (2021), and far more from-the-heart ripsnorters which reveal her to be a deft hand at communicating heartbreak, loneliness and real inner growth."

== Track listing ==
All tracks are written by Toni Watson, except where noted.

Beautifully Ordinary track listing
No.	Title	Producer(s)	Length
1.	"To Be Loved"	Watson; Randy Belculfine	5:05
2.	"Lose Someone Like Me"	Watson; Belculfine; Xander	4:06
3.	"I Get High"	Watson; Belculfine	4:20
4.	"We'll See Stars"	Watson; Belculfine; Jacob Farah; Jerome Farah; Joel Farland	3:50
5.	"Dance with Me"	Watson; Belculfine	3:45
6.	"Figure It Out"	Watson; Belculfine	4:25
7.	"Wonderful" (Watson, Rick Nowels)	Watson; Belculfine; Nowels	3:47
8.	"Raise Me Up"	Watson; Belculfine; Xander	4:34
9.	"Dreaming" (Watson, Sam Nelson Harris)	Watson; Belculfine; Harris	3:28
10.	"You Don't Know Me Like That"	Watson; Belculfine; Ja. Farah; Je. Farah	3:53
11.	"John Doe" (Watson, Nowels)	Watson; Nowels	3:35
12.	"Sorrento"	Watson; Belculfine	4:44
13.	"Need You to Love Me"	Watson; Belculfine; Ja. Farah; Je. Farah	3:58
14.	"Only One"	Watson; Belculfine	3:48
15.	"Live Without Your Love" (Watson, Joshua Karp)	Watson; Belculfine; Budo^{[a]}	3:34
16.	"Call My Name" (Watson, Jenna Andrews, Stephen Kirk)	Watson; Andrews; Belculfine; Kirk	2:41
Total length:			63:33

Note

- ^{^[a]} signifies an additional producer.

== Personnel ==
Musicians

- Tones and I – lead vocals
- Randy Belculfine – synthesizer (tracks 1, 2, 4–8, 10, 13–16); keyboards, piano (1, 2, 4–8, 10, 13–15), guitar (1, 4–8, 10, 12–15), percussion (1, 4–8, 10, 13–15), additional strings (1, 2, 7, 8), Mellotron (1, 4, 6, 8, 14), bass (1, 5, 6, 13, 15), organ (6, 7, 13–15), clavinet (10), strings (14, 15)
- Choir Collective – choir (tracks 1, 3, 6, 8, 10, 15)
- Liz Webber – choir direction (tracks 1, 3, 6, 8, 10, 15)
- Tonion – strings (tracks 1, 2, 8)
- Xander – strings (tracks 1, 2, 8)
- Kara-Lee James – background vocals (tracks 2, 5, 7, 10, 16)
- Sam Plummer – guitar (track 5)
- Belle Bangard – background vocals (track 7), vocal direction (11, 16)
- Austin Corona – effects keyboards (track 7); bass, drums (11)
- Rick Nowels – piano (tracks 7, 11)
- Angelia Panteli – background vocals (track 7)
- Jayden Miranda – background vocals (track 7)
- Randy Lilomaiava – background vocals (track 7)
- Soli Tesema – background vocals (track 7)
- Tino Tusitala – background vocals (track 7)
- Patrick Warren – strings (track 7)
- David Francisco – bass (track 8)
- Dave Levita – guitar (track 11)

Technical

- Chris Gehringer – mastering
- Richard Stolz – mixing (tracks 1, 2, 10–12), engineering (1, 2, 4–8, 10–16)
- Andrew Maury – mixing (tracks 1, 3, 4, 9, 14)
- Alex Ghenea – mixing (tracks 5, 16)
- Steve Dresser – mixing (track 6)
- Dean Reid – mixing (track 7)
- Miles Walker – mixing (tracks 8, 13)
- Mark Mongilio – mixing (track 15)
- Randy Belculfine – engineering
- Eric J Dubowsky – engineering (track 2)
- John Christopher Fee – engineering (tracks 7, 11)
- Sam Nelson Harris – engineering (track 9)
- Rick Nowels – engineering (track 11)
- Joshua "Budo" Karp – engineering (track 15)
- Stephen Kirk – engineering (track 16)
- Belle Bangard – arrangement (track 7), vocal arrangement (16)

== Charts ==
=== Weekly charts ===
Weekly chart performance for Beautifully Ordinary
Chart (2024)	Peak position
Australian Albums (ARIA)	1

=== Year-end charts ===
2024 year-end chart performance for Beautifully Ordinary
Chart (2024)	Position
Australian Artist Albums (ARIA)	12
