= Won't Sleep =

2021 song by Tones and I

Single by Tones and I

from the album Welcome to the Madhouse
- Released: 14 May 2021
- Length: 3:17
- Label: Bad Batch; Sony Music Australia; Elektra
- Songwriter(s): Toni Watson
- Producer(s): Watson; Randy Belculfine

Tones and I singles chronology
"Fly Away" (2020)	"Won't Sleep" (2021)	"Cloudy Day" (2021)

Music video
- "Won't Sleep" on YouTube

"Won't Sleep" is a song by Australian singer Tones and I. It was released on 14 May 2021 through Bad Batch Records, distributed by Sony Music in Australia and New Zealand and globally by Elektra Records as the second single from her debut studio album, Welcome to the Madhouse.

About the song, Tones and I said "I loved writing this song and playing around with the production, the bass and drums. It's a song about me and my friends staying home and partying through lockdown."

At the 2021 ARIA Music Awards, the Nick Kozakis, Liam Kelly and Tones and I directed video was nominated for Best Video.

== Music video ==
The music premiered on 14 May 2021, and was co-directed by Tones, Nick Kozakis and Liam Kelly, It shows two kids stumbling into a haunted house filled with monsters, with the singer as their leader.

== Critical reception ==
Laura English from Music Feeds said "It's a brooding pop release full of really fun, textured percussion [and] the production on this one is absolutely ace."

Sose Fuamoli from Triple J said the track "has a delightfully creepy electro vibe [and] is all about getting up to no good; mischief in the best way."

== Charts ==
Chart (2021)	Peak position
Australia (ARIA)	77
New Zealand Hot Singles (RMNZ)	19
US Hot Rock & Alternative Songs (Billboard)	49
