= Eyes Don't Lie (song) =

2022 single by Tones and I

Single by Tones and I
- Released: 17 March 2022
- Length: 3:56
- Label: Bad Batch; Sony Music Australia; Elektra
- Songwriter(s): Toni Watson; Eren Cannata; Sam Homaee
- Producer(s): Eren Cannata; Sam Homaee

Tones and I singles chronology
"Cloudy Day" (2021)	"Eyes Don't Lie" (2022)	"Chant" (2022)

Music video
- "Eyes Don't Lie" on YouTube

"Eyes Don't Lie" is a song by Australian singer Tones and I. It was released on 17 March 2022 through Bad Batch Records, distributed by Sony Music in Australia and New Zealand and globally by Elektra Records.

Tones and I said, "'Eyes Don't Lie' is written about a large loss of someone/something, resenting the person/feeling you get and realising it was a toxic person/feeling all along."

== Charts ==
Weekly chart performance for "Eyes Don't Lie"
Chart (2022)	Peak position
Australian Artist (ARIA)	14
Lebanon (Lebanese Top 20)	15
New Zealand Hot Singles (RMNZ)	22
