= Never Seen the Rain =

Single by Tones and I

from the EP The Kids Are Coming
- Released: 16 July 2019
- Length: 3:20
- Label: Bad Batch; Sony Music; Elektra
- Songwriter: Toni Watson
- Producer: Konstantin Kersting

Tones and I singles chronology
"Dance Monkey" (2019)	"Never Seen the Rain" (2019)	"The Kids Are Coming" (2019)

Music video
- "Never Seen the Rain" on YouTube

"Never Seen the Rain" is a song by Australian singer Tones and I, released in Australia on 16 July 2019 as the third single (second in the US) from Tones and I's debut EP The Kids Are Coming. Upon release Tones and I said "[It's] about people who live the same repetitive life in fear of failure. So, they never try." In January 2020, the single was released outside of Australia. In February, it achieved gold status in New Zealand. At the end of August 2020 it was certified 5× platinum by ARIA for shipment of 350,000 copies.

The song won Most Performed Australian Work and Most Performed Pop Work at the APRA Music Awards of 2021.

== Critical reception ==
Al Newstead from ABC said "'Never Seen the Rain' retains her keen pop sensibilities but wraps those distinctive vocals into an uplifting chorus."

== Music video ==
The music video was produced by Visible Studios, directed by Nick Kozakis and Liam Kelly, and released on 7 August 2019.

== Personnel ==
Credits adapted from AllMusic.

- Toni Watson – composer
- Konstantin Kersting – mixing, production
- Andrei Eremin – mastering

== Charts ==
=== Weekly charts ===
Chart (2019–2020)	Peak position
Australia (ARIA)	7
Australian Airplay (The Music Network)	1
Austria (Ö3 Austria Top 40)	70
Belgium (Ultratop 50 Flanders)	6
Belgium (Ultratop 50 Wallonia)	3
France (SNEP)	46
Germany (GfK)	51
Ireland (IRMA)	21
Lithuania (AGATA)	81
Netherlands (Dutch Top 40)	20
Netherlands (Single Top 100)	19
New Zealand (Recorded Music NZ)	36
Portugal (AFP)	198
Scotland Singles (Official Charts)	90
Slovakia Singles Digital (ČNS IFPI)	68
Sweden (Sverigetopplistan)	69
Switzerland (Schweizer Hitparade)	49
UK Singles (Official Charts)	99

=== Year-end charts ===
Chart (2019)	Position
Australia (ARIA)	39
Chart (2020)	Position
Australia (ARIA)	24
Belgium (Ultratop Flanders)	18
Belgium (Ultratop Wallonia)	9
France (SNEP)	110
Netherlands (Dutch Top 40)	93
Netherlands (Single Top 100)	66

== Certifications ==
Region	Certification	Certified units/sales
Australia (ARIA)	6× Platinum	420,000^{‡}
Austria (IFPI Austria)	Gold	15,000^{‡}
Belgium (BRMA)	Platinum	40,000^{‡}
Canada (Music Canada)	Gold	40,000^{‡}
Denmark (IFPI Danmark)	Gold	45,000^{‡}
France (SNEP)	Platinum	200,000^{‡}
New Zealand (RMNZ)	2× Platinum	60,000^{‡}
Poland (ZPAV)	Gold	25,000^{‡}
United Kingdom (BPI)	Silver	200,000^{‡}
^{‡} Sales+streaming figures based on certification alone.

== Release history ==
Region	Date	Format(s)	Label
Australia	16 July 2019	Streaming; digital download	Bad Batch
