= Fly Away (Tones and I song) =

2020 song by Tones and I

Single by Tones and I

from the album Welcome to the Madhouse
- Released: 13 November 2020
- Length: 2:58
- Label: Bad Batch; Sony; Elektra
- Songwriter: Toni Watson
- Producers: Tones and I; Dann Hume

Tones and I singles chronology
"Ur So F**king Cool" (2020)	"Fly Away" (2020)	"Won't Sleep" (2021)

Music video
- "Fly Away" on YouTube

"Fly Away" is a song by Australian singer Tones and I. It was released on 13 November 2020 through Bad Batch Records and Elektra Records, as the lead single from her debut studio album Welcome to the Madhouse (2021).

At the 2021 ARIA Music Awards, it was nominated for Song of the Year and Best Pop Release.

At the APRA Music Awards of 2022, the song won Most Performed Pop Work and was nominated for Most Performed Australian Work.

== Background ==
About the song, Tones said, "'Fly Away' is about chasing your dreams, reaching your goals, and the realities that come with it." The song was announced on social media on 9 November 2020, by showing only a snippet of it. It was used in a largely successful Qantas campaign called "Fly Away."

== Music video ==
The music video for "Fly Away" was directed by Nick Kozakis and Liam Kelly, which premiered on 13 November, 2020.

== Credits and personnel ==
Credits adapted from Tidal.

- Toni Watson – songwriting, production
- Dann Hume – production, mixing
- Andrei Eremin – mastering

== Charts ==
=== Weekly charts ===
Weekly chart performance for "Fly Away"
Chart (2020–2021)	Peak position
Australia (ARIA)	4
Austria (Ö3 Austria Top 40)	36
Belgium (Ultratip Bubbling Under Flanders)	33
Belgium (Ultratop 50 Wallonia)	27
Canada Hot 100 (Billboard)	87
Czech Republic Airplay (ČNS IFPI)	9
Denmark (Tracklisten)	11
Germany (GfK)	44
Global 200 (Billboard)	152
Ireland (IRMA)	10
Mexico Ingles Airplay (Billboard)	24
New Zealand (Recorded Music NZ)	37
Norway (VG-lista)	37
Poland Airplay (ZPAV)	42
Sweden (Sverigetopplistan)	29
Switzerland (Schweizer Hitparade)	30
UK Singles (Official Charts)	11
US Hot Rock & Alternative Songs (Billboard)	14

=== Year-end charts ===
Year-end chart performance for "Fly Away"
Chart (2021)	Position
Australia (ARIA)	24
Denmark (Tracklisten)	28
Ireland (IRMA)	49
Sweden (Sverigetopplistan)	99
Switzerland (Schweizer Hitparade)	98
UK Singles (OCC)	56
US Hot Rock & Alternative Songs (Billboard)	39

== Certifications ==
Region	Certification	Certified units/sales
Australia (ARIA)	3× Platinum	210,000^{‡}
Austria (IFPI Austria)	Gold	15,000^{‡}
Denmark (IFPI Danmark)	Platinum	90,000^{‡}
France (SNEP)	Gold	100,000^{‡}
Germany (BVMI)	Gold	200,000^{‡}
Italy (FIMI)	Gold	50,000^{‡}
New Zealand (RMNZ)	3× Platinum	90,000^{‡}
Poland (ZPAV)	Platinum	50,000^{‡}
United Kingdom (BPI)	Platinum	600,000^{‡}
^{‡} Sales+streaming figures based on certification alone.

== Release history ==
Release dates and formats for "Fly Away"
Region	Date	Format	Label	Ref.
Various	13 November 2020	Digital download; streaming	Bad Batch	
Australia	16 November 2020	Contemporary hit radio	Sony	
Italy	20 November 2020	Contemporary hit radio	Warner	
United States	16 March 2021	Contemporary hit radio	Elektra	
