= Tones and I =

Australian pop singer

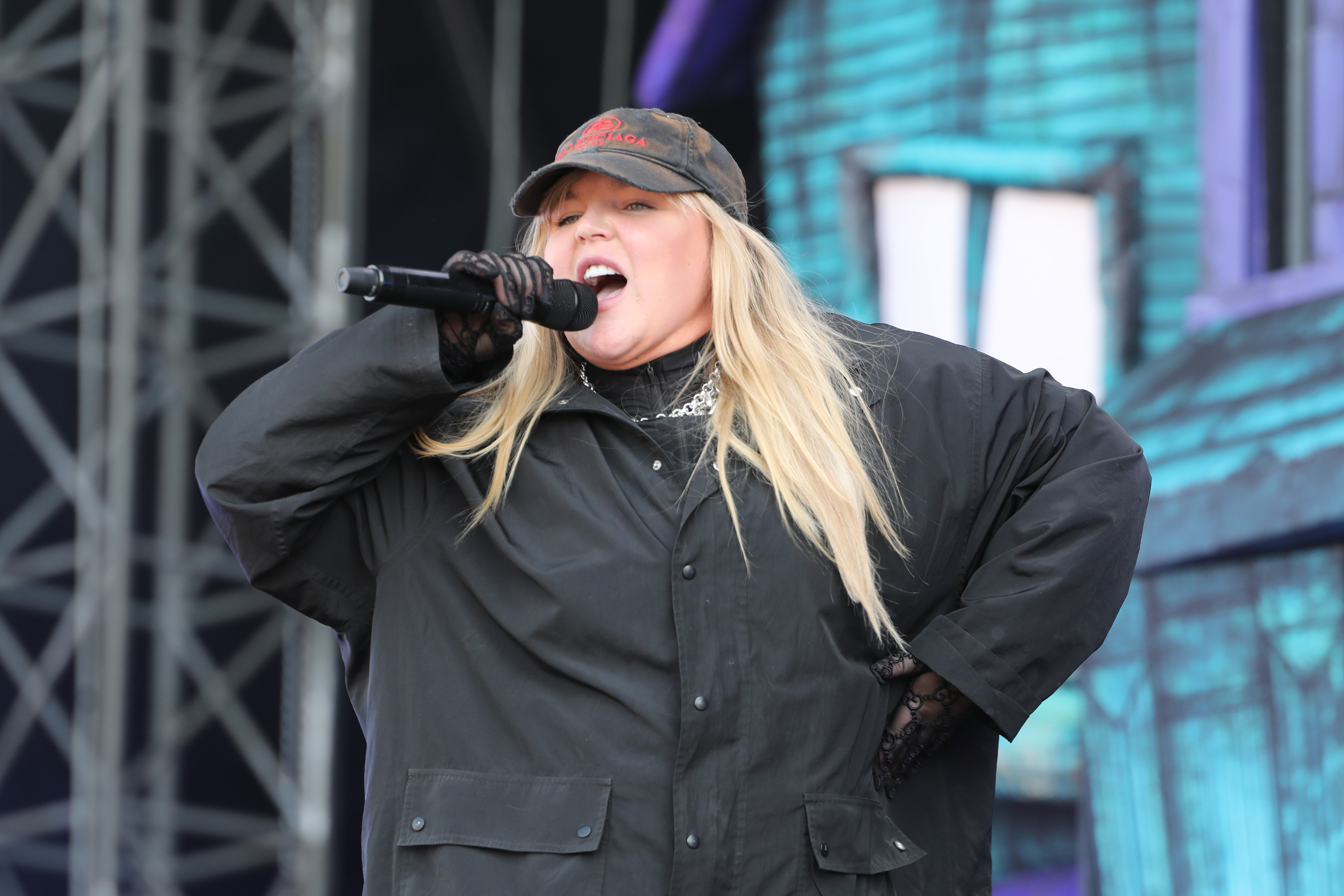
- Watson performing in 2022 at the Southside Festival

Background information
- Also known as: Tones; Tonah
- Born: Toni Watson; 1993 (age 32–33); Mount Martha, Victoria, Australia
- Origin: Frankston, Victoria, Australia
- Genres: Pop; indie pop
- Occupations: Singer; songwriter; record producer
- Instruments: Vocals; piano; keyboards; drum pads
- Years active: 2009–present
- Labels: Bad Batch; Sony; Elektra
- Spouse: Jimmy Bedford (m. 2023; sep. 2025)
- Website: tonesandi.com

Toni Watson, known professionally as Tones and I, is an Australian singer, songwriter, and record producer. She is best known for her 2019 single "Dance Monkey", which went number one in over 30 countries including her native home Australia. In 2019–20, "Dance Monkey" completed 24 weeks at number one on the Australian singles chart, beating Bing Crosby's all-time Australian record for his version of "White Christmas", which spent an equivalent of 22 weeks at the top in 1943. "Dance Monkey" was certified 19× platinum by ARIA for shipments of over 1,330,000 units by June 2023.

Tones was the most awarded artist at the ARIA Music Awards of 2019, winning four of eight nominations. She released her debut extended play, The Kids Are Coming, on 30 August 2019; it peaked at number three in Australia, and top 10 in several countries. Her debut album, Welcome to the Madhouse, was released via Bad Batch on 16 July 2021. It debuted at number one on the ARIA Albums Chart. The album's lead single "Fly Away" peaked at number four in Australia, number 11 in the UK and Denmark, and number 10 in Ireland. In February 2024, she became the first female artist to reach over 3 billion streams for a single song on Spotify, with "Dance Monkey".

== Life and career ==
=== Early years ===
Toni Watson grew up in Mount Martha on the Mornington Peninsula to the south of Melbourne. She later explained how she chose a music career: "One day I was at the park with my family, all my cousins and stuff, in Frankston ... We were all just singing a song and my aunty was like 'oh guys, she can actually hold a note'. I think that's the earliest memory of someone actually pointing me out as someone that has an ability to sing. I was probably like 7 years old." The singer-songwriter had learned to play keyboards and drum pads while at secondary school. She started busking in Melbourne while working in fashion retail at the Universal Store.

In 2009, as Toni Watson, she created a YouTube page and posted a cappella cover versions of songs. She performed at local gigs and festivals including the Let Go festival. Tones and I was the vocalist for a duo in 2014 remembering: "I started out singing in small pubs and bars in Mornington, I was singing along to a guitarist until I ended up branching out on my own." She explained her shift to a solo career: "I actually got made redundant from my retail job and with that money I bought an RC300 [loop station] and just started to try to figure it all out." She busked "up and down the east coast with her synthesizers and loop pedal, she has been building a loyal fanbase and captivating crowds with her genre-diverse style."

In September 2017, the singer-songwriter travelled to Byron Bay, New South Wales, to busk there. At an early performance she met music lawyer Jackson Walkden-Brown (ex-Aerials) who became her talent manager about a month later. Busking success led to a greater commitment to her music career. The artist spent 2018 living between Walkden-Brown's home in the Gold Coast hinterland and in her van in Byron Bay, writing music and busking full time. Later in the year she won the Battle of the Buskers at Buskers by the Creek.

=== 2019–2020: "Dance Monkey" and The Kids Are Coming ===
In February 2019, Tones and I signed to Bad Batch Records/Sony Music Australia alongside a co-management deal with Artists Only (owned by Walkden-Brown) and Lemon Tree Music (co-owned by Regan Lethbridge and David Morgan, both ex-Bonjah members). In the same month she uploaded her debut single, "Johnny Run Away", to Australian national youth radio station Triple J's website, Unearthed, which publishes the music of unsigned artists. The track was recorded with Australian producer, Konstantin Kersting. AllMusic's Fred Thomas observed, "[it] became a viral sensation, racking up streams."

"Johnny Run Away" was added to full rotation on Triple J the following week and received high ratings from staff: Richard Kingsmill (four-and-a-half out of five stars), Tommy Faith (five stars) and Declan Byrne (four-and-a-half stars). Natalie O'Driscoll of Blank Gold Coast described the track, "a melodic slice of Nordic-inspired electro-pop that tells a very important story." Two weeks later, Tones and I officially released "Johnny Run Away". It peaked at number 12 on the ARIA Singles Chart and achieved triple platinum status for shipments of over 210,000 units.

On 10 May 2019, Tones and I released her second single, "Dance Monkey". She recalled the track was "Written alone in a dark closet in not much more than 30 minutes." Craig Mathieson of The Age felt, "It's pop writ large – catchy yet familiar, slightly ludicrous yet genuinely affecting." It reached number one on the official music charts of over 30 countries, including Australia, Austria, Belgium, Canada, China, Denmark, Egypt, Finland, France, Germany, Ireland, Italy, Japan, Malaysia, the Netherlands, New Zealand, Norway, Portugal, South Africa, Sweden, Switzerland, and the United Kingdom.

"Dance Monkey"'s music video was directed by Liam Kelly and Nick Kozakis. In Australia in November 2019, she broke the record for the most weeks atop the ARIA Singles Chart (which commenced in mid-1989) by any artist, with 16 weeks. This was previously held by Ed Sheeran's "Shape of You" (15 weeks in 2017). By mid-January 2020, "Dance Monkey" had spent 24 weeks at number one. This surpasses the achievement of Bing Crosby's number-one hit "White Christmas", which spent 5 months (equivalent to 22 weeks) at the top during 1943. It was the first Australian song to reach number one on Spotify's global daily top 200 streaming chart. On 8 February 2020, it equalled Post Malone's "Rockstar" for the most days at number one on the same chart. As of 18 February 2020, "Dance Monkey" returned to the Spotify top spot and had spent 120 days at number one.

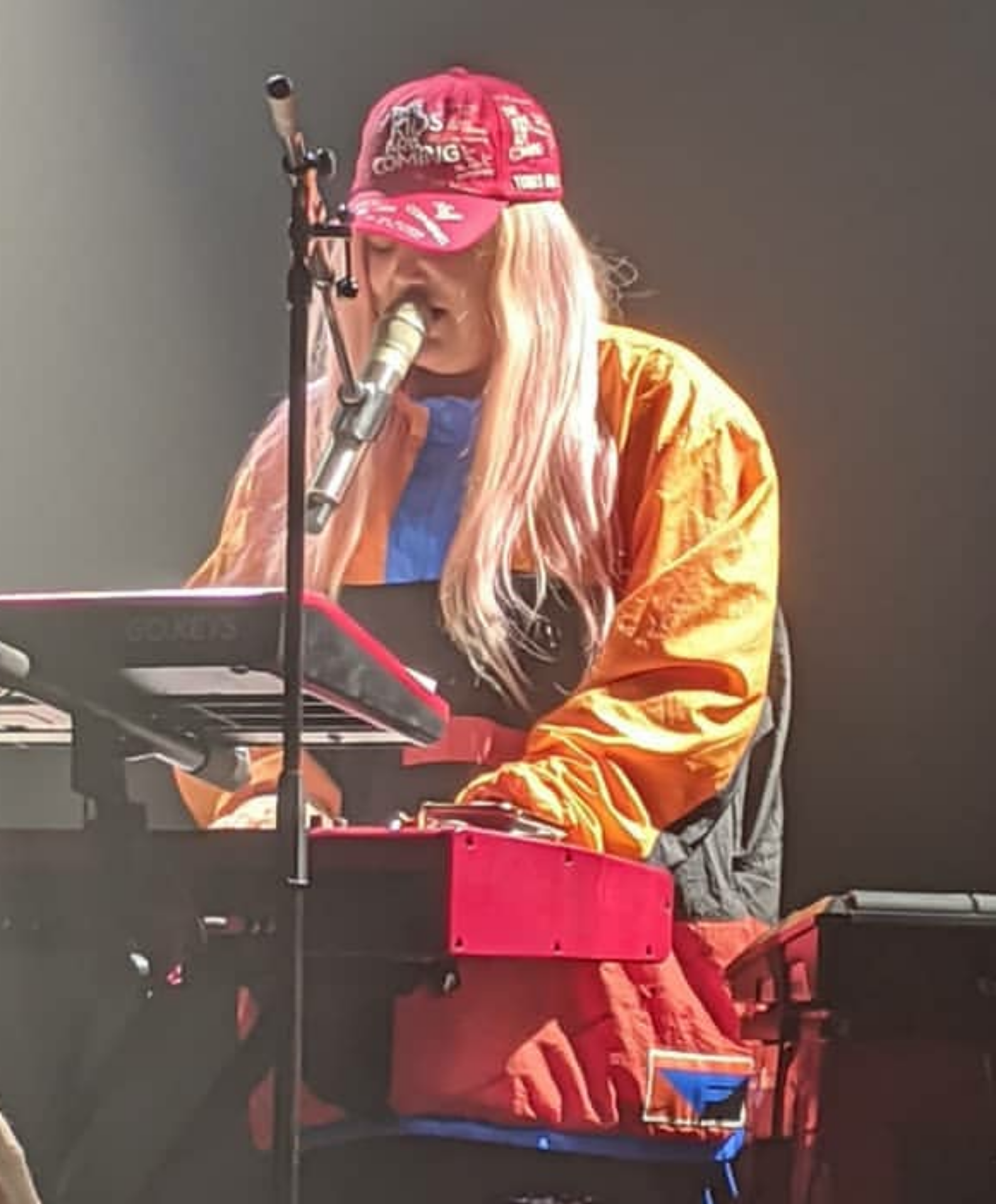
In a concert performing on keyboards, February 2020

In May 2019, Tones performed at the Big Pineapple Music Festival and opened Splendour in the Grass 2019 as the Triple J Unearthed Splendour in the Grass competition winner, where she broke the record for the biggest crowd of an opening set. In July, she released a third single, "Never Seen the Rain" and followed with her six-track debut extended play, The Kids Are Coming on 30 August 2019. In September 2019, Tones and I performed "Dance Monkey" and "The Kids Are Coming" at the AFL Grand Final with an audience of 100,000. In January 2020, three of the EP's tracks were listed on the Triple J Hottest 100, 2019: "Dance Monkey" (No. 4), "Never Seen the Rain" (No. 15) and "Johnny Run Away" (No. 26).

On 1 February 2020, she started her Kids Are Coming World Tour with five Laneway Festival dates in Australia and seven dates in North America. Riff Magazine's Rachel Goodman caught her performance in San Francisco in mid-month, "[she] brought a palpable energy to the stage, which concertgoers enthusiastically reciprocated... [and] spoke about busking every day on the streets of Byron Bay in Australia and how she learned to communicate with audiences—and quickly capture people's attention."

A total of 52 dates were announced for the tour through to July. However due to the COVID-19 pandemic local tour dates were rescheduled from April 2021. Likewise the artist curtailed her European performances, "I must cut short the rest of my first tour over here, as the majority of the remaining shows have already been cancelled due to government policy and I do not want to subject anyone to making a choice between coming to see me and their health."

On 7 May 2020, Triple J premiered a new song, "We Can’t Wait to Go Back to a Festival When This Is Over", as part of a COVID-19 self-isolation musical challenge, Quarantune. On 20 May, "Dance Monkey" reached 1 billion views on YouTube. It won the Grand Prize of the prestigious 2019 International Songwriting Competition, which was announced in May 2020. Also, in the same month, the artist appeared on the cover of Rolling Stone (Australia) and was interviewed by its managing editor, Poppy Reid. Reid had seen her at the Laneway Festival in February, "there's a manic energy and excitement surrounding her at all times... [she] offers a new blueprint for future generations... the possibility of a global career built out of regional Australia, sans a major label... and without a stack of co-writers."

=== 2020–2021: Welcome to the Madhouse ===
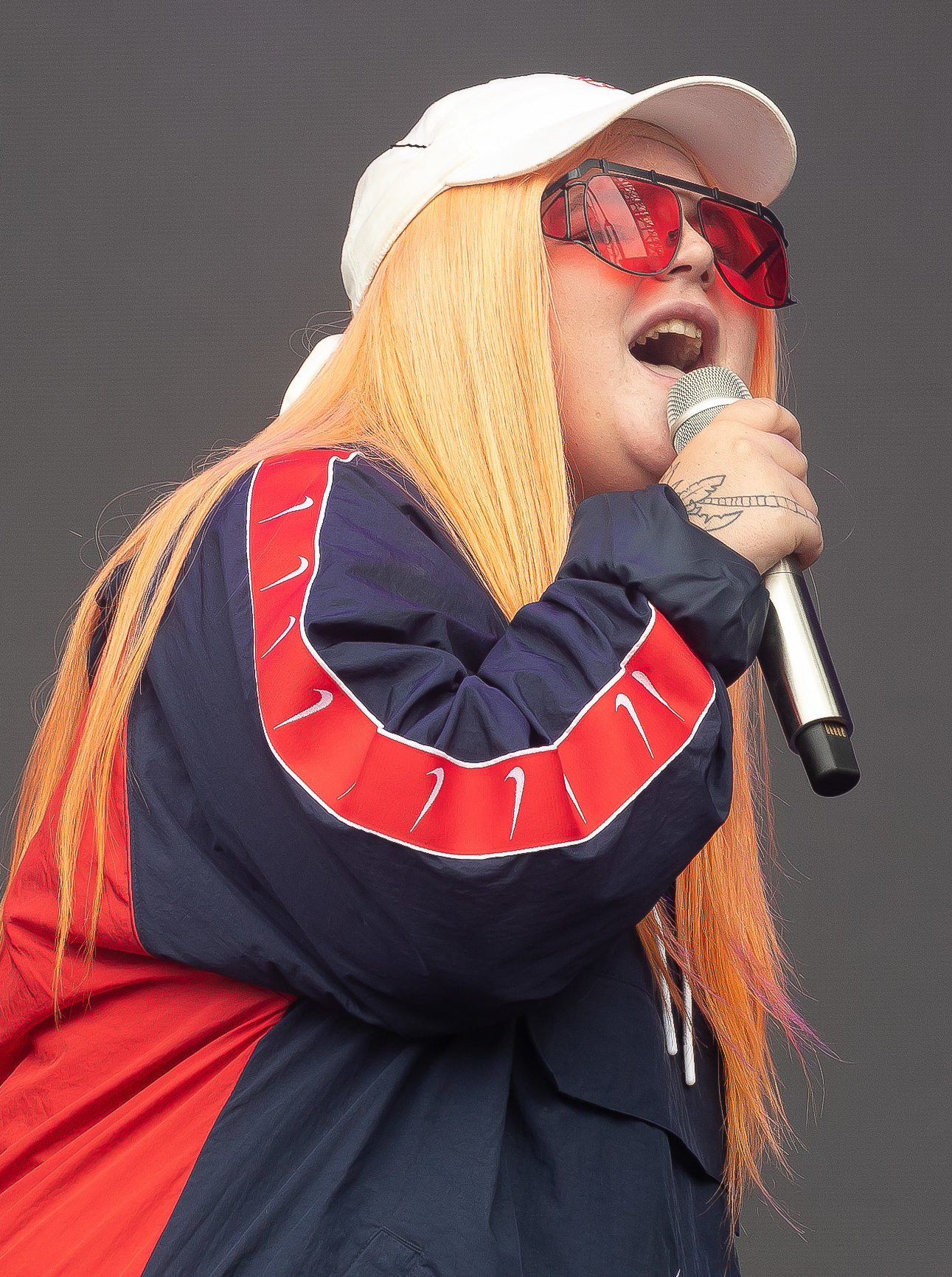
Singing at Laneway Festival, Sydney, February 2020

During August 2020, the singer and her management, sponsored an Instagram-based competition, That One Song, which featured a different developing artist each day. The artist "share(d) original content" on her account. After 2 September the finalists were voted for by the public, from the 20 artists which were previously showcased. The competition was won by pop rock duo, Monatomic's entry, "They're Playing My Song". Tones and I co-headlined a virtual concert, with Gary Clark Jr., on 5 and 6 September 2020. The performances were fundraisers for the Equal Justice Initiative and were streamed live on various media channels.

The artist also announced in September 2020 that her debut album would be expected in 2 or 3 months, "I've taken the time to just really make sure it's what I want. And I want to add more music to the album. It will be my first ever album, so I really want to make sure I'm proud of it." The singer's next single, "Fly Away", appeared in mid-November and its first live performance occurred on 24 November at the Newcastle Civic Theatre. The single achieved moderate global success, peaking at 4 in Australia, 10 in Ireland, 11 in the UK and Denmark, and top 40 in several European countries.

For the 2020 ARIA Music Awards, she received three further nominations and joined an all-female ensemble for a tribute performance of "I Am Woman" in honour of Helen Reddy (1941–2020). In April 2021, she restarted her Australian national tour in Melbourne, which visited east coast capitals as well as Cairns into May. Her single, "Won't Sleep", was released on 14 May.

Tones and I released her debut album Welcome to the Madhouse, on 16 July 2021 via Bad Batch/Sony Music Australia. It includes the singles, "Fly Away", "Won't Sleep" and "Cloudy Day" (June 2021). Guardian Australia's Shaad D'Souza rated the album at two-out-of-five stars, and described it as "unadventurous and occasionally exhausting". D'Souza expanded, "the vast majority of the record deals with Watson’s struggle with mental health issues as well as the cruelty of her haters, both online and in real life. But beyond the logline, there's little to connect with here." Martin Boulton of The Sydney Morning Herald gave it four stars, stating, "Behind her clever, tongue-in-cheek lyrics and strong, occasionally soaring, vocals is a self-confessed outsider attempting to open herself up through music. No easy task." The album debuted at number one on the ARIA Albums Chart and spent 4 weeks within the top 50. In 2021, she was also named the top songwriter of 2020 by the music rights company Blokur, thanks to the success of her song "Dance Monkey," which she wrote and produced herself. During an interview with the organization, she discussed her songwriting process, stating, "I usually start with the chords or with a line. I like writing melodies before attempting to connect them with the story I am trying to tell."

=== 2022–present: Beautifully Ordinary ===
In January 2022, Tones and I told Triple J's Sose Fuamoli, "I've already started (working on) this next album that's coming out in August; it's very different." The album's lead single, "Eyes Don't Lie", was issued in March. In May, she appeared at the APRA Music Awards of 2022 to perform Amyl and the Sniffers' "Guided by Angels", which was a nominee for Song of the Year. Al Newstead of Triple J was surprised by Tones' "heavenly rendition", she was backed by a choir and delivered a "full-flight vocal performance." Her collaboration with Macklemore, "Chant", appeared in July and was followed in the next month with her solo single "Charlie". The latter is an ode to her pet dogs.

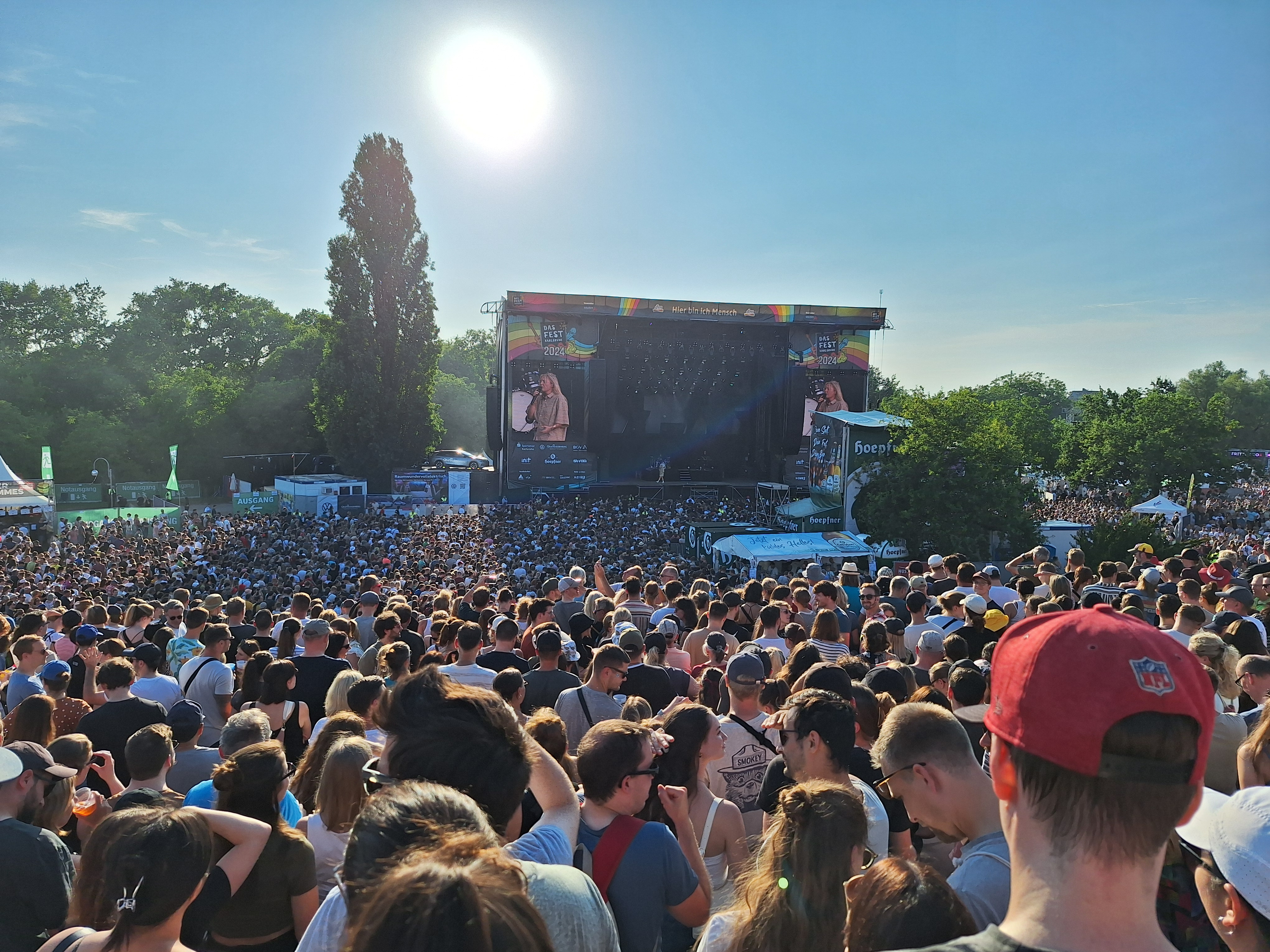
Tones and I at Das Fest (2024)

Daniel Hartmann of Range declared that her second album is expected to be, "cheerful and groovy music made for performing live." At the 2022 ARIA Music Awards ceremony, Tones was appointed musical director for a tribute performance honouring Olivia Newton-John (1948–2022). She performed alongside Natalie Imbruglia, Kye, and Peking Duk covering Newton-John's "Hopelessly Devoted to You", "Xanadu", and "You're the One That I Want". The artist also won Song of the Year for "Cloudy Day". Her next single, "I Made It", appeared in February 2023 and was used for the biopic, True Spirit (2023). On 20 August, she performed at the 2023 FIFA Women's World Cup closing ceremony. Her setlist included "I Am Free", "I Made It", "Fly Away", "Dance Monkey" and "The Greatest"; the latter track was used to support the Australian women's team, the Matildas. In August 2023, Billboard's Lars Brandle indicated the second album was expected in 2024.

On 2 February 2024, she released the single "Dreaming". Tones and I supported Pink's Australian leg of her Summer Carnival tour from 9 February to 23 March 2024. The Australian singer issued her next single, "I Get High", in mid-March and, in June, announced the release of her second album Beautifully Ordinary for 2 August 2024. Her headlining tour of Australia is expected in August.

== Personal life ==
Toni Watson started dating bricklayer and footballer Jason Scott "Jimmy" Bedford in early 2020. Bedford, who plays for Frankston Bombers, closed his 10-year bricklaying company to become Tones and I's stage technician and touring audio engineer. The couple were engaged in December 2021 and married in Bali in March 2023.

In July 2023, Watson's company Johnny Run Away Investments and Bedford himself were fined a total of $A25,000 for undertaking renovations to an investment property without building permits. Watson had purchased the Frankston property in September 2020 for $A720,000, which Bedford started renovating in October and November before subcontractors continued until works were completed in March 2022. The renovations were deemed "compliant and safe" but had been completed despite Frankston City Council's issuance of a stop work notice. Bedford, who had been touring with Tones and I, explained he must have been too busy to deal with it.

In November 2024, Watson's American Bulldog, "Boss", attacked and killed a 17-year-old cavoodle belonging to a neighbour. Watson was fined $A3,000 in May 2025 for failing to confine her two dogs, and failing to register the bulldog. The neighbour incurred minor injuries and a passer-by who tried to assist sustained a fractured hand. Watson's offer to pay "any funeral-related costs" was declined, and her bulldog was later put down.

Watson separated from her husband at the end of 2025.

== Discography ==
- Welcome to the Madhouse (2021)
- Beautifully Ordinary (2024)

== Awards and nominations ==
=== AIR Awards ===
The Australian Independent Record Awards (commonly known informally as AIR Awards) is an annual awards night to recognise, promote and celebrate the success of Australia's Independent Music sector. The inaugural ceremony occurred in 2006.

Year	Nominee / work	Award	Result	Ref.
2020	"Dance Monkey"	Independent Song of the Year	Won	
2020	The Kids Are Coming	Best Independent Pop Album or EP	Nominated	
2020	Herself	Breakthrough Independent Artist of the Year	Won	

=== APRA Music Awards ===
The APRA Music Awards are held in Australia and New Zealand by the Australasian Performing Right Association to recognise songwriting skills, sales and airplay performance by its members annually. The Australian ceremonies began in 1982. Tones and I has won seven awards from ten nominations.

Year	Nominee / work	Award	Result	Ref.
2020	"Dance Monkey"	Song of the Year	Won	
2020	"Dance Monkey"	Most Performed Australian Work of the Year	Nominated	
2020	"Dance Monkey"	Most Performed Pop Work of the Year	Nominated	
2020	Herself	Breakthrough Songwriter of the Year	Won	
2021	"Never Seen the Rain"	Most Performed Australian Work of the Year	Won	
2021	"Never Seen the Rain"	Most Performed Pop Work of the Year	Won	
2021	"Bad Child"	Song of the Year	Shortlisted	
2022	"Fly Away"	Most Performed Australian Work of the Year	Nominated	
2022	"Fly Away"	Most Performed Pop Work of the Year	Won	
2022	"Fly Away"	Song of the Year	Shortlisted	
2022	"Dance Monkey"	Most Performed Australian Work Overseas	Won	
2023	"Dance Monkey"	Most Performed Australian Work Overseas	Won	
2025	"Dreaming"	Most Performed Australian Work	Nominated	
2025	"Dreaming"	Most Performed Pop Work	Nominated	

=== ARIA Music Awards ===
The ARIA Music Awards is an annual awards ceremony that recognises excellence, innovation, and achievement across all genres of Australian music. The first ceremony occurred in 1987. For the 2019 awards, Tones and I was nominated for eight awards and won four.

Year	Nominee / work	Award	Result	Ref.
2019	"Dance Monkey"	Best Female Artist	Won	
2019	"Dance Monkey"	Breakthrough Artist	Won	
2019	"Dance Monkey"	Best Pop Release	Won	
2019	"Dance Monkey"	Song of the Year	Nominated	
2019	Liam Kelly & Nick Kozakis for Tones and I – "Dance Monkey"	Best Video	Nominated	
2019	The Kids Are Coming	Best Independent Release	Won	
2019	Konstantin Kersting for Tones and I – "Dance Monkey"	Engineer of the Year	Nominated	
2019	Konstantin Kersting for Tones and I – "Dance Monkey"	Producer of the Year	Nominated	
2020	"Bad Child" / "Can't Be Happy All the Time"	Best Female Artist	Nominated	
2020	Nick Kozakis, Liam Kelly, Tones and I - "Ur So F**kInG cOoL"	Best Video	Nominated	
2020	"Never Seen the Rain"	Song of the Year	Nominated	
2021	Welcome to the Madhouse	Album of the Year	Nominated	
2021	Welcome to the Madhouse	Best Artist	Nominated	
2021	"Fly Away"	Best Pop Release	Nominated	
2021	"Fly Away"	Song of the Year	Nominated	
2021	Nick Kozakis, Liam Kelly, Tones and I for Tones and I – "Won't Sleep"	Video of the year	Nominated	
2021	Giulia Giannini McGauran & Mitchell Eaton for Tones and I for Welcome to the Madhouse	Best Cover Art	Nominated	
2022	"Cloudy Day"	Song of the Year	Won	
2024	Beautifully Ordinary	Best Solo Artist	Nominated	
2024	Giulia McGauran & Sam Chirnside for Tones and I - Beautifully Ordinary	Best Cover Art	Nominated	
2024	"Dance With Me" (Tones and I, Nick Kozakis and Sela Vai)	Best Video	Won	
2024	Tones and I - P!nk Supported By Tones and I	Best Australian Live Act	Nominated	
2024	Tones and I: Qantas Olympics: Already Proud (Howatson+Company)	Best Use of an Australian Recording in an Advertisement	Nominated	

=== Australian Women in Music Awards ===
The Australian Women in Music Awards is an annual event that celebrates outstanding women in the Australian Music Industry who have made significant and lasting contributions in their chosen field. They commenced in 2018.

Year	Nominee / work	Award	Result	Ref.
2023	Toni Watson	Songwriter Award	Won	

=== International Songwriting Competition ===
The International Songwriting Competition (ISC) is an annual song contest for both aspiring and established songwriters. The judging panel is made up of musicians, songwriters and industry experts, and songs are judged on creativity, originality, lyrics, melody, arrangement, and overall likeability.

Year	Category	Nominated work	Result	Ref.
2019	Grand Prize	"Dance Monkey"	Won	

=== J Awards ===
The J Awards are an annual series of Australian music awards that were established by the Australian Broadcasting Corporation's youth-focused radio station Triple J. They commenced in 2005.

Year	Nominee / work	Award	Result	Ref.
2019	Tones and I	Unearthed Artist of the Year	Won	
2021	Welcome to the Madhouse	Australian Album of the Year	Nominated	

=== MTV Europe Music Awards ===
The MTV Europe Music Awards is an award presented by Viacom International Media Networks to honour artists and music in pop culture.

Year	Nominee / work	Award	Result	Ref.
2019	Herself	Best Australian Act	Nominated	
2020	Herself	Best Australian Act	Nominated	

=== Music Victoria Awards ===
The Music Victoria Awards are an annual awards night celebrating Victorian music. They commenced in 2005.

Year	Nominee / work	Award	Result	Ref.
2019	Tones and I	Outstanding Achievement	Awarded	
2019	Tones and I	Breakthrough Victorian Act	Nominated	
2024	Tones and I	Best Pop Work	Nominated	

=== National Live Music Awards ===
The National Live Music Awards (NLMAs) are a broad recognition of Australia's diverse live industry, celebrating the success of the Australian live scene. The awards commenced in 2016.

Year	Nominee / work	Award	Result	Ref.
2019	Herself	Best New Act	Won	

=== Rolling Stone Australia Awards ===
The Rolling Stone Australia Awards are awarded annually in January or February by the Australian edition of Rolling Stone magazine for outstanding contributions to popular culture in the previous year.

Year	Nominee / work	Award	Result	Ref.
2021	Tones and I	Rolling Stone Global Award	Nominated	
2022	"Fly Away"	Best Single	Nominated	
2022	Tones and I	Rolling Stone Global Award	Nominated	
2023	Tones and I	Rolling Stone Global Award	Nominated	
2024	Tones and I	Rolling Stone Global Award	Won	
2025	"Dance With Me"	Best Single	Shortlisted	
2025	Tones and I	Best Live Act	Shortlisted	

=== Spotify Awards ===
The Spotify Awards commenced in 2017.

Year	Nominee / work	Award	Result	Ref.
2020	Herself	Biggest Increase in Fans – Female Artist	Nominated	
2020	Herself	Emerging Artist	Won	
