= Johnny Run Away =

Single by Tones and I

from the EP The Kids Are Coming
- Released: 1 March 2019
- Genre: Electropop
- Length: 3:13
- Label: Bad Batch/Elektra Records
- Songwriter: Toni Watson
- Producer: Konstantin Kersting

Tones and I singles chronology
"Johnny Run Away" (2019)	"Dance Monkey" (2019)

Music video
- "Johnny Run Away" on YouTube

"Johnny Run Away" is the debut single by Australian singer Tones and I, released on 1 March 2019 as the lead single from Tones and I's debut EP The Kids Are Coming. The song was recorded with Konstantin Kersting and has peaked at number 12 on the ARIA Singles Chart. Upon release, Tones and I said "'Johnny Run Away' is about my best friend coming out to his disapproving father at a young age. The song shows how people are dealing with judgement and rejection within their own family, as well as the world."

== Background and release ==
In May 2020 Tones and I told Poppy Reid of Rolling Stone (Australia), how she had met Kurt in 2012 and eventually they lived together, "One night at their home, [he] opened up to Tones in the way only someone who knows their heart is safe can do. He told her of his coming out journey and how it had almost broken him."

"Johnny Run Away" became her first song writing effort. Kurt reminisced, "I've had people come up to me and say they've gone through similar things and it's really helped them. I wish there was something like that ten years ago for me."

The song was uploaded onto Triple J Unearthed on 15 February 2019 and within 12 hours, received airplay on Triple J. The song was officially released for download and streaming on 1 March 2019.

== Critical reception ==
Natalie O'Drisscol from Blank GC described the song as "a melodic slice of Nordic-inspired electro-pop that tells a very important story." Declan Byrne from Triple J said the song "is a bouncy, beautifully crafted, catchy af pop jam and Tones' striking voice will grab you straight away."

== Music video ==
The music video was directed by Luke Dunning and released on 28 February 2019.

== Charts ==
=== Weekly charts ===
Chart (2019)	Peak position
Australia (ARIA)	12
Ireland (IRMA)	83

=== Year-end charts ===
Chart (2019)	Position
Australia (ARIA)	32

== Certifications ==
Region	Certification	Certified units/sales
Australia (ARIA)	3× Platinum	210,000^{‡}
New Zealand (RMNZ)	Gold	15,000^{‡}
^{‡} Sales+streaming figures based on certification alone.

== Release history ==
Region	Date	Format(s)	Label
Australia	1 March 2019	Streaming; digital download	Bad Batch
