= Dance Monkey =

2019 single by Tones and I

Single by Tones and I

from the EP The Kids Are Coming
- Released: 10 May 2019
- Genre: Electropop
- Length: 3:29
- Label: Bad Batch; Elektra
- Songwriter: Toni Watson
- Producer: Konstantin Kersting

Tones and I singles chronology
"Johnny Run Away" (2019)	"Dance Monkey" (2019)	"Never Seen the Rain" (2019)

Music video
- "Dance Monkey" on YouTube

"Dance Monkey" is a song by Australian singer Tones and I, released on 10 May 2019 as the second single (first in the US) from Tones and I's debut EP, The Kids Are Coming. The song was produced and mixed by Konstantin Kersting.

"Dance Monkey" topped the official singles charts in over 38 countries and peaked within the top ten of many others, including the United States. The song broke the record for the most weeks at number one on the Australian singles chart at 24 non-consecutive weeks. It also broke the record for the most weeks spent at the top of the UK Singles Chart by a female artist with 11 weeks at the top. When it hit number four in the US, it became the first top-five hit solely written by a woman in over eight years. On Spotify, as of March 2024, the song is the most streamed by a female artist and the thirteenth-most overall, with over 3 billion streams. The song was also the first song by a female artist to reach 3 billion streams.

The song has received a number of awards. It won Best Pop Release at the ARIA Music Awards of 2019, Song of the Year at the APRA Music Awards of 2020 and Independent Song of the Year at the AIR Awards of 2020. It was also the Grand Prize winner of the 2019 International Songwriting Competition.

== Lyrics ==
When interviewed by DJ Smallzy in July 2019 on Australian radio station Nova FM, Tones explained that "Dance Monkey"'s lyrics are about the relationship she had with her audience when she was busking (street performing) on the streets of Australia:

"I wrote this song when I was busking, and about the pressure that I felt to always be entertaining people on the street. And if they didn't like it, when they looked at their phones they could just click something else; ... we are all so used to being entertained at the click of a button."

"So when you're [busking] on the street, .. to command [your] attention, people would be like: 'again! again!' .. 'more! more!' .. or they would just leave. So if you replace [the lyric]: 'dance for me, dance for me' with 'sing for me, sing for me,' it's pretty literal," she said.

== Music video ==
Liam Kelly and Nick Kozakis directed the music video, which was released on 24 June 2019, produced by Visible Studios. It follows the character "Mr. Tones" (played by Tones and I), an elderly man who sneaks out of a care home with his friends so they can go to a golf course and have a dance party with other senior citizens.

Due to the overcast weather on the day of filming, every shot of the music video had its sky replaced digitally. In 2020, it was added to APRA billion streams list. As of September 2026, the video has over 2.3 billion views on YouTube. The music video was filmed at Eynesbury Golf Club, Victoria, Australia.

== Commercial performance ==
Upon reaching its tenth week at the top of the Australian Singles Chart, "Dance Monkey" broke the record for the most weeks at number one on the chart by an Australian artist. In November 2019, during its sixteenth week at number one, it broke the record for the most weeks at number one in Australia's ARIA chart history (1983–present), previously held by Ed Sheeran's "Shape of You" (2017). "Dance Monkey" also holds the record for the longest time at number one across Australian singles charts, with 24 weeks (including 21 consecutive weeks from August to late December 2019).

In the United Kingdom, "Dance Monkey" broke the record for the most weeks spent at the top of the UK Singles Chart by a female artist when it remained at the top of the chart for an eleventh week. The previous record of ten weeks was held jointly by Whitney Houston's version of "I Will Always Love You" in 1992–1993 and "Umbrella" by Rihanna and Jay-Z in 2007.

"Dance Monkey" was the sixth highest ranked global digital single of 2019 according to IFPI, moving 11.4 million converted units. In November 2020, "Dance Monkey" was declared the most Shazamed song of all time with 36.6 million searches. In December 2020, Dance Monkey became the third most-streamed song on Spotify with over 2.5 billion streams, making Tones the first female artist to do so.

== Reception ==
Al Newstead from ABC called the song "another powerhouse melody" adding it will "instantly lodge itself in your brain". Mike Kaplan, senior VP/Programming for Entercom Alternative WNYL New York City (the first station in the United States to play the song), notes "Sonically, it's catchy and extremely memorable," adding "Its international success certainly helped convince us to share it with our listeners."

However, despite its commercial success, Dance Monkey has proved divisive. Tones even expressed that she "loathe[s] that song a lot of the time [...] a lot of times I don't want to sing it."

== Live performances ==
Tones made her debut on US television on 18 November 2019 with a performance of the song on The Tonight Show Starring Jimmy Fallon. On 10 December 2019, Tones appeared as a guest performer again in the US on The Voice. The following week, "Dance Monkey" entered the US Billboard Hot 100 top ten for the first time at number nine, and later peaked at number four on the chart.

== Accolades ==
At the ARIA Music Awards of 2019, Tones and I was nominated for eight awards, winning four. Tones won ARIA Award for Best Female Artist and Breakthrough Artist while "Dance Monkey" won Best Pop Release and The Kids Are Coming EP won Best Independent Release. At the APRA Music Awards of 2020, "Dance Monkey" was nominated for Song of the Year, Most Performed Australian Work of the Year and Most Performed Pop Work of the Year, winning Song of the Year. At the AIR Awards of 2020, the song won Independent Song of the Year. In May 2020, "Dance Monkey" was announced as the Grand Prize winner of the 2019 International Songwriting Competition.

== Personnel ==
Credits adapted from Spotify.

- Toni Watson – vocals, composer
- Konstantin Kersting – mixing, production
- Andrei Eremin – mastering

== Charts ==
=== Weekly charts ===
2019–2021 weekly chart performance for "Dance Monkey"
Chart (2019–2021)	Peak position
Argentina Hot 100 (Billboard)	2
Australia (ARIA)	1
Austria (Ö3 Austria Top 40)	1
Belgium (Ultratop 50 Flanders)	1
Belgium (Ultratop 50 Wallonia)	1
Bolivia Airplay (Monitor Latino)	3
Brazil Airplay (Crowley Charts)	29
Brazil International Pop Airplay (Crowley Charts)	1
Bulgaria Airplay (PROPHON)	1
Canada Hot 100 (Billboard)	1
Canada AC (Billboard)	21
Canada CHR/Top 40 (Billboard)	4
Canada Hot AC (Billboard)	15
Chile Airplay (Monitor Latino)	4
Colombia Airplay (National-Report)	4
CIS Airplay (TopHit)	2
Costa Rica Airplay (Monitor Latino)	2
Croatia International Airplay (Top lista)	2
Czech Republic Airplay (ČNS IFPI)	1
Czech Republic Singles Digital (ČNS IFPI)	1
Denmark (Tracklisten)	1
Dominican Republic Airplay (SodinPro)	19
Ecuador Airplay (National-Report)	1
El Salvador Airplay (Monitor Latino)	2
Estonia (Eesti Tipp-40)	1
Euro Digital Song Sales (Billboard)	1
Finland (Suomen virallinen lista)	1
France (SNEP)	1
Germany (GfK)	1
Global 200 (Billboard)	18
Greece International (IFPI)	1
Guatemala Airplay (Monitor Latino)	8
Honduras Airplay (Monitor Latino)	13
Hong Kong (HKRIA)	14
Hungary (Rádiós Top 40)	1
Hungary (Single Top 40)	1
Hungary (Stream Top 40)	1
Iceland (Tónlistinn)	1
Ireland (IRMA)	1
Israel International Airplay (Media Forest)	1
Italy (FIMI)	1
Japan Hot 100 (Billboard)	47
Latvia Streaming (LaIPA)	1
Lithuania (AGATA)	1
Lebanon (Lebanese Top 20)	2
Luxembourg Digital (Billboard)	1
Malaysia (RIM)	1
Mexico Airplay (Billboard)	1
Netherlands (Dutch Top 40)	1
Netherlands (Single Top 100)	1
New Zealand (Recorded Music NZ)	1
Nicaragua Airplay (Monitor Latino)	4
Norway (VG-lista)	1
Panama Airplay (Monitor Latino)	8
Peru Airplay (Monitor Latino)	1
Poland Airplay (ZPAV)	1
Portugal (AFP)	1
Romania (Airplay 100)	1
Russia Airplay (TopHit)	2
Scottish Singles Sales (Official Charts)	1
Singapore (RIAS)	1
Slovakia Airplay (ČNS IFPI)	1
Slovakia Singles Digital (ČNS IFPI)	1
Slovenia Airplay (SloTop50)	1
South Africa Streaming (RISA)	27
South Korea (Gaon)	15
Spain (Promusicae)	2
Sweden (Sverigetopplistan)	1
Switzerland (Schweizer Hitparade)	1
Ukraine Airplay (TopHit)	1
UK Singles (Official Charts)	1
Uruguay Airplay (Monitor Latino)	5
US Billboard Hot 100	4
US Adult Pop Airplay (Billboard)	11
US Dance Club Songs (Billboard)	24
US Dance Airplay (Billboard)	3
US Pop Airplay (Billboard)	6
US Hot Rock & Alternative Songs (Billboard)	3
US Rock & Alternative Airplay (Billboard)	14
US Rhythmic Airplay (Billboard)	23
US Rolling Stone Top 100	3
Venezuela Airplay (Monitor Latino)	13
Wales (OCC)	17

2022 weekly chart performance for "Dance Monkey"
Chart (2022)	Peak position
CIS Airplay (TopHit)	95
Ukraine Airplay (TopHit)	52

2023 weekly chart performance for "Dance Monkey"
Chart (2023)	Peak position
Belarus Airplay (TopHit)	102
CIS Airplay (TopHit)	138
Kazakhstan Airplay (TopHit)	119
Moldova Airplay (TopHit)	104
Romania Airplay (TopHit)	94
Ukraine Airplay (TopHit)	105

2024 weekly chart performance for "Dance Monkey"
Chart (2024)	Peak position
Belarus Airplay (TopHit)	153
CIS Airplay (TopHit)	186
Estonia Airplay (TopHit)	180
Kazakhstan Airplay (TopHit)	187
Moldova Airplay (TopHit)	27
Romania Airplay (TopHit)	88
Ukraine Airplay (TopHit)	119

2025 weekly chart performance for "Dance Monkey"
Chart (2025)	Peak position
Belarus Airplay (TopHit)	167
CIS Airplay (TopHit)	175
Estonia Airplay (TopHit)	169
Moldova Airplay (TopHit)	55
Ukraine Airplay (TopHit)	74

2026 weekly chart performance for "Dance Monkey"
Chart (2026)	Peak position
CIS Airplay (TopHit)	184
Estonia Airplay (TopHit)	181
Moldova Airplay (TopHit)	151
Romania Airplay (TopHit)	163
Ukraine Airplay (TopHit)	86

=== Monthly charts ===
2019 monthly chart performance for "Dance Monkey"
Chart (2019)	Position
CIS Airplay (TopHit)	2
Paraguay (SGP)	37
Russia Airplay (TopHit)	2
Ukraine Airplay (TopHit)	1

2020 monthly chart performance for "Dance Monkey"
Chart (2020)	Position
CIS Airplay (TopHit)	2
Russia Airplay (TopHit)	5
Ukraine Airplay (TopHit)	1

2020 monthly chart performance for "Dance Monkey"
Chart (2020)	Position
CIS Airplay (TopHit)	42
Ukraine Airplay (TopHit)	35
Russia Airplay (TopHit)	61

2024 monthly chart performance for "Dance Monkey"
Chart (2024)	Position
Moldova Airplay (TopHit)	45

=== Year-end charts ===
2019 year-end chart performance for "Dance Monkey"
Chart (2019)	Position
Australia (ARIA)	2
Austria (Ö3 Austria Top 40)	1
Belgium (Ultratop Flanders)	9
Belgium (Ultratop Wallonia)	9
Canada (Canadian Hot 100)	81
CIS Airplay (TopHit)	46
Denmark (Tracklisten)	4
France (SNEP)	7
Germany (Official German Charts)	2
Hungary (Rádiós Top 40)	54
Hungary (Single Top 40)	4
Iceland (Tónlistinn)	6
Ireland (IRMA)	4
Italy (FIMI)	15
Latvia (LAIPA)	2
Netherlands (Dutch Top 40)	14
Netherlands (Single Top 100)	10
New Zealand (Recorded Music NZ)	11
Poland (ZPAV)	18
Portugal (AFP)	38
Romania (Airplay 100)	47
Russia Airplay (TopHit)	41
Slovenia (SloTop50)	46
Spain (PROMUSICAE)	61
Sweden (Sverigetopplistan)	2
Switzerland (Schweizer Hitparade)	5
Tokyo (Tokio Hot 100)	21
Ukraine Airplay (TopHit)	174
UK Singles (OCC)	8
Worldwide (IFPI)	6

2020 year-end chart performance for "Dance Monkey"
Chart (2020)	Position
Argentina Airplay (Monitor Latino)	2
Australia (ARIA)	4
Austria (Ö3 Austria Top 40)	3
Belgium (Ultratop Flanders)	4
Belgium (Ultratop Wallonia)	4
Canada (Canadian Hot 100)	1
CIS Airplay (TopHit)	15
Denmark (Tracklisten)	8
France (SNEP)	4
Germany (Official German Charts)	2
Hungary (Dance Top 40)	1
Hungary (Rádiós Top 40)	3
Hungary (Single Top 40)	3
Hungary (Stream Top 40)	4
Ireland (IRMA)	5
Italy (FIMI)	17
Mexico Airplay (Monitor Latino)	2
Mexico Streaming (Monitor Latino)	2
Netherlands (Dutch Top 40)	77
Netherlands (Single Top 100)	3
New Zealand (Recorded Music NZ)	5
Poland (ZPAV)	48
Romania (Airplay 100)	18
Russia Airplay (TopHit)	30
Spain (PROMUSICAE)	5
South Korea (Gaon)	28
Sweden (Sverigetopplistan)	5
Switzerland (Schweizer Hitparade)	2
Ukraine Airplay (TopHit)	2
UK Singles (OCC)	2
US Billboard Hot 100	14
US Adult Top 40 (Billboard)	33
US Dance/Mix Show Airplay (Billboard)	26
US Mainstream Top 40 (Billboard)	22
US Hot Rock & Alternative Songs (Billboard)	16
Worldwide (IFPI)	2

2021 year-end chart performance for "Dance Monkey"
Chart (2021)	Position
Australia (ARIA)	37
Austria (Ö3 Austria Top 40)	62
CIS Airplay (TopHit)	63
Denmark (Tracklisten)	85
France (SNEP)	36
Germany (Official German Charts)	44
Global 200 (Billboard)	22
Hungary (Dance Top 40)	39
Poland (ZPAV)	89
Portugal (AFP)	120
Russia Airplay (TopHit)	146
South Korea (Gaon)	82
Spain (PROMUSICAE)	94
Sweden (Sverigetopplistan)	96
Switzerland (Schweizer Hitparade)	35
UK Singles (OCC)	38
Ukraine Airplay (TopHit)	43

2022 year-end chart performance for "Dance Monkey"
Chart (2022)	Position
Australia (ARIA)	60
CIS Airplay (TopHit)	139
Global 200 (Billboard)	53
Ukraine Airplay (TopHit)	89

2023 year-end chart performance for "Dance Monkey"
Chart (2023)	Position
Belarus Airplay (TopHit)	186
CIS Airplay (TopHit)	183
Romania Airplay (TopHit)	174
Ukraine Airplay (TopHit)	159

Year-end chart performance
Chart (2025)	Position
Argentina Anglo Airplay ([Monitor Latino)	76

=== Decade-end charts ===
2010s-end chart performance for "Dance Monkey"
Chart (2010–2019)	Position
Australia (ARIA)	76
Australian Artist Singles (ARIA)	10

== Certifications ==
Certifications and sales for "Dance Monkey"
Region	Certification	Certified units/sales
Australia (ARIA)	19× Platinum	1,330,000^{‡}
Austria (IFPI Austria)	7× Platinum	210,000^{‡}
Belgium (BRMA)	5× Platinum	200,000^{‡}
Brazil (Pro-Música Brasil)	2× Diamond	320,000^{‡}
Canada (Music Canada)	Diamond	800,000^{‡}
Denmark (IFPI Danmark)	5× Platinum	450,000^{‡}
France (SNEP)	Diamond	333,333^{‡}
Germany (BVMI)	7× Gold	1,400,000^{‡}
Italy (FIMI)	6× Platinum	420,000^{‡}
Netherlands (NVPI)	2× Platinum	160,000^{‡}
New Zealand (RMNZ)	10× Platinum	300,000^{‡}
Poland (ZPAV)	4× Diamond	1,000,000^{‡}
Portugal (AFP)	4× Platinum	40,000^{‡}
Spain (Promusicae)	7× Platinum	280,000^{‡}
Switzerland (IFPI Switzerland)	3× Platinum	60,000^{‡}
United Kingdom (BPI)	7× Platinum	4,200,000^{‡}
United States (RIAA)	4× Platinum	4,000,000^{‡}
Streaming
Chile (PROFOVI)	Platinum	29,000,000
Japan (RIAJ)	Gold	50,000,000^{†}
South Korea (KMCA)	Platinum	100,000,000^{†}
^{‡} Sales+streaming figures based on certification alone.^{†} Streaming-only figures based on certification alone.

== Release history ==
Release dates for "Dance Monkey"
Region	Date	Format(s)	Label	Version
Australia	10 May 2019	Streaming; digital download	Bad Batch	Original
Various	18 October 2019	Streaming; digital download	Bad Batch	Stripped Back

== See also ==
- List of Airplay 100 number ones of the 2010s
- List of Airplay 100 number ones of the 2020s
- List of airplay number-one hits in Argentina
- List of best-selling singles in Australia
- List of number-one singles of 2019 (Australia)
- List of number-one hits of 2019 (Austria)
- List of Canadian Hot 100 number-one singles of 2019
- List of number-one hits of 2019 (Denmark)
- List of number-one singles of 2019 (Finland)
- List of number-one hits of 2019 (Germany)
- List of number-one singles of 2019 (Ireland)
- List of number-one songs of 2019 (Malaysia)
- List of number-one singles from the 2010s (New Zealand)
- List of number-one songs in Norway
- List of number-one singles of 2019 (Poland)
- List of number-one songs of 2019 (Singapore)
- List of number-one singles of the 2010s (Sweden)
- List of number-one hits of 2019 (Switzerland)
- List of UK Singles Chart number ones of the 2010s
- List of most-streamed songs on Spotify
